= 2015 Arizona Cardinals season =

NFL team season

- Owner: Bill Bidwill
- General manager: Steve Keim
- Head coach: Bruce Arians
- Offensive coordinator: Harold Goodwin
- Defensive coordinator: James Bettcher
- Home stadium: University of Phoenix Stadium

Results
- Record: 13–3
- Division place: 1st NFC West
- Playoffs: Won Divisional Playoffs (vs. Packers) 26–20 (OT); Lost NFC Championship (at Panthers) 15–49
- All-Pros: 4: CB Patrick Peterson (1st team); S Tyrann Mathieu (1st team); QB Carson Palmer (2nd team); G Mike Iupati (2nd team)
- Pro Bowlers: 8: QB Carson Palmer; WR Larry Fitzgerald; G Mike Iupati; DE Calais Campbell; CB Patrick Peterson; FS Tyrann Mathieu; ST Justin Bethel; RB (alternate) Chris Johnson

Uniform
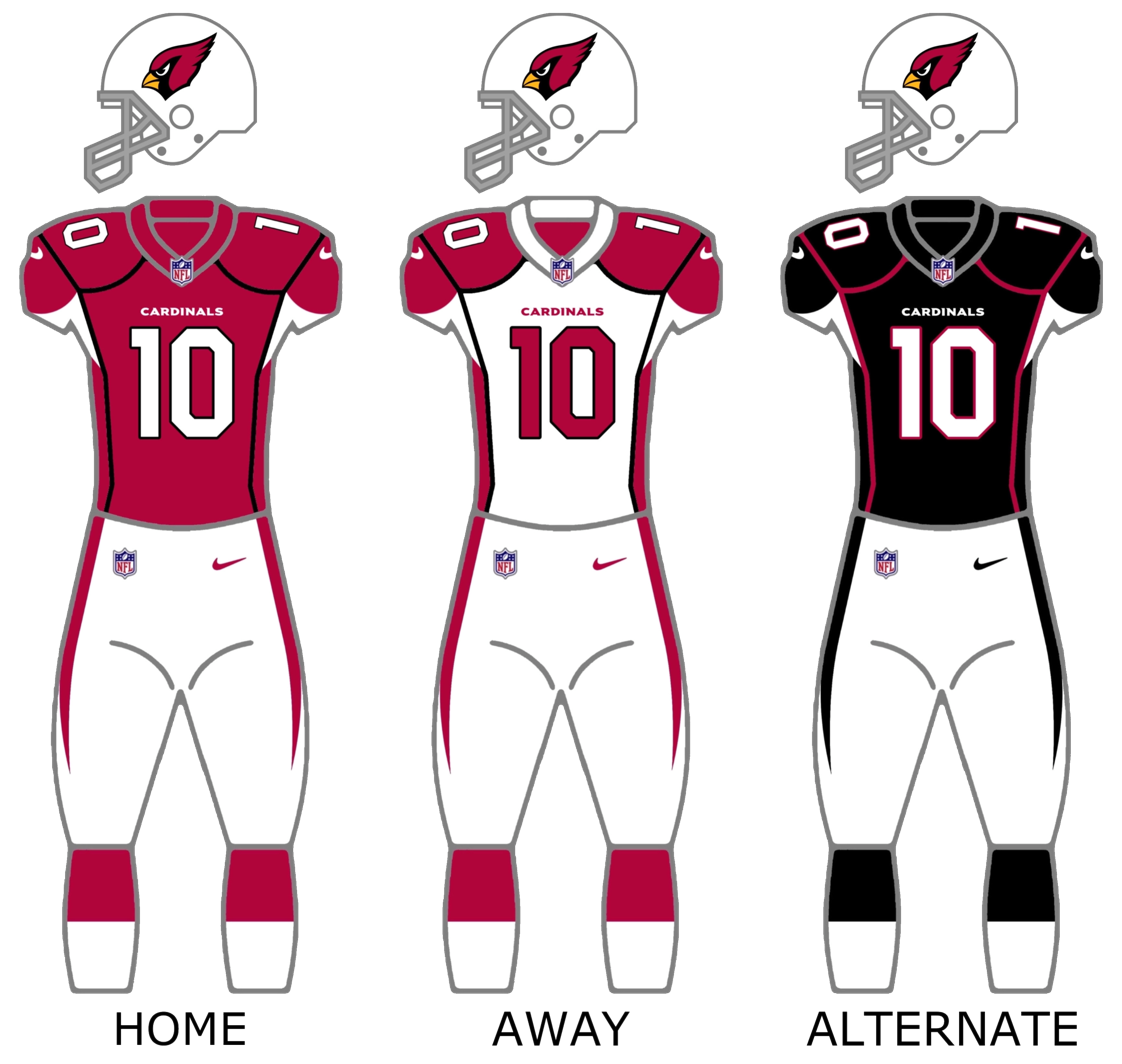

The 2015 season was the Arizona Cardinals' 96th in the National Football League (NFL), their 117th overall, their 28th in Arizona, their 10th playing home games at University of Phoenix Stadium and their third under head coach Bruce Arians. The Cardinals clinched their first NFC West title since 2009, in addition to a franchise best 13 wins. They also clinched a first round bye for the first time in franchise history.

The second-seeded Cardinals began their playoff run by defeating the fifth-seeded Green Bay Packers 26–20 in overtime in the divisional round, giving quarterback Carson Palmer his first career playoff win. However, they were defeated by the top-seeded 15-1 Carolina Panthers in the NFC championship by a score of 49–15, played in Bank of America Stadium, in Charlotte, North Carolina, with the Cardinals committing seven turnovers, tied for the most turnovers in a conference championship game since the Los Angeles Rams were defeated by the Dallas Cowboys abruptly in the 1978 season by a score of 28–0. The 2015 NFC Championship Game was a rematch of the 2008 NFC Divisional Round, which saw the 9–7 fourth-seeded Cardinals upset the 12–4 second-seeded Panthers in their home stadium.

Until 2021, this was the last season in which the Cardinals would have a winning season or postseason appearance. The season was covered by the Amazon Original sports docuseries All or Nothing. The Cardinals also played (as of 2026) their last game in St. Louis, which had been home to the Cardinals from 1960 until 1987 and the Rams since 1995, with the latter team becoming the Cardinals' divisional rivals in 2002. The Rams returned to the Los Angeles metropolitan area after the 2015 season.

Also as of 2025, this remains the most recent season the Cardinals have won a playoff game, having gone 0–2 (including the NFC Championship Game loss) since.

== 2015 draft class ==
2015 Arizona Cardinals Draft
Round	Selection	Player	Position	College
1	24	D. J. Humphries	OT	Florida
2	58	Markus Golden	DE	Missouri
3	86	David Johnson	RB	Northern Iowa
4	116	Rodney Gunter	DT	Delaware State
5	158	Shaquille Riddick	DE	West Virginia
5	159	J. J. Nelson	WR	UAB
7	256	Gerald Christian	TE	Louisville

Compensatory selection – Mr. Irrelevant

== Staff ==
2015 Arizona Cardinals staff
Front office: Owner/chairman – Bill Bidwill; President – Michael Bidwill; general manager – Steve Keim; Vice president of player personnel – Terry McDonough; Director of college scouting – Dru Grigson; Director of pro scouting – Quentin Harris; Head coaches: Head coach – Bruce Arians; Assistant head coach/offense – Tom Moore; Offensive coaches: Offensive coordinator/offensive line – Harold Goodwin; Quarterbacks – Freddie Kitchens; Running backs – Stump Mitchell; Wide receivers – Darryl Drake; Tight ends – Rick Christophel; Assistant tight ends/assistant special teams – Steve Heiden; Assistant offensive line – Larry Zierlein; Offensive assistant – David Diaz-Infante; Offensive quality control – Kevin Garver	Defensive coaches: Defensive coordinator – James Bettcher; Defensive line – Brentson Buckner; Linebackers – Bob Sanders; Assistant linebackers – Larry Foote; Defensive backs – Nick Rapone; Cornerbacks – Kevin Ross; Pass rush specialist – Tom Pratt; Special teams coaches: Special teams coordinator – Amos Jones; Assistant special teams – Anthony Blevins; Strength and conditioning: Strength and conditioning – Buddy Morris; Assistant strength and conditioning – Roger Kingdom

== Final roster ==
2015 Arizona Cardinals roster
Quarterbacks (QB): 9 Matt Barkley; 3 Carson Palmer; 5 Drew Stanton; Running backs (RB): 38 Andre Ellington; 31 David Johnson; 30 Stepfan Taylor; 33 Kerwynn Williams; Wide receivers (WR): 13 Jaron Brown; 12 John Brown; 11 Larry Fitzgerald; 15 Michael Floyd; 10 Brittan Golden; 14 J. J. Nelson; Tight ends (TE): 85 Darren Fells; 84 Jermaine Gresham; 87 Troy Niklas	Offensive linemen (OL): 61 Jonathan Cooper G; 74 D. J. Humphries T; 76 Mike Iupati G; 62 Ted Larsen G; 70 Bobby Massie T; 63 Lyle Sendlein C; 53 A. Q. Shipley C; 79 Bradley Sowell T; 68 Jared Veldheer T; Defensive linemen (DL): 71 Red Bryant DE; 93 Calais Campbell DE; 54 Dwight Freeney DE; 95 Rodney Gunter NT; 96 Kareem Martin DE; 97 Josh Mauro; 90 Cory Redding DE; 92 Frostee Rucker DE; 91 Ed Stinson DE; 94 Xavier Williams NT	Linebackers (LB): 20 Deone Bucannon ILB; 59 Alani Fua OLB; 44 Markus Golden OLB; 51 Kevin Minter ILB; 57 Alex Okafor OLB; 47 Shaquille Riddick OLB; 55 Sean Weatherspoon ILB; Defensive backs (DB): 28 Justin Bethel CB; 29 Chris Clemons SS; 22 Tony Jefferson S; 26 Rashad Johnson SS; 21 Patrick Peterson CB; 25 Jerraud Powers CB; 36 D. J. Swearinger FS; 27 Corey White CB; Special teams (ST): 2 Drew Butler P; 7 Chandler Catanzaro K; 82 Mike Leach LS	Practice squad: 43 Carrington Byndom CB; 67 Rob Crisp T (IR); 37 Durell Eskridge FS; 41 Marion Grice RB; 39 Robert Hughes RB; 50 Gabe Martin ILB; 60 Antoine McClain G; 72 Olsen Pierre DE; 16 Jaxon Shipley WR; 73 John Wetzel T; 34 Kevin White CB; Reserve: 83 Gerald Christian TE (IR); 54 Kenny Demens ILB (IR); 75 John Fullington G (IR); 23 Chris Johnson RB (IR/DFR); 32 Tyrann Mathieu FS (IR); 80 Ifeanyi Momah TE (IR); 45 Brandon Person SS (IR); 98 Corey Peters NT (IR); 86 Damond Powell WR (NF-Inj.); 49 Zack Wagenmann OLB (IR); 78 Earl Watford G (IR); 58 Daryl Washington ILB (Susp.); 56 LaMarr Woodley OLB (IR); Rookies in italics 53 active, 14 reserve, 10 practice squad

== Preseason ==
=== Schedule ===
Week	Date	Opponent	Result	Record	Venue	Recap
1	August 15	Kansas City Chiefs	L 19–34	0–1	University of Phoenix Stadium	Recap
2	August 22	San Diego Chargers	L 19–22	0–2	University of Phoenix Stadium	Recap
3	August 30	at Oakland Raiders	W 30–23	1–2	O.co Coliseum	Recap
4	September 3	at Denver Broncos	W 22–20	2–2	Sports Authority Field at Mile High	Recap

== Regular season ==
=== Schedule ===
Week	Date	Opponent	Result	Record	Venue	Recap
1	September 13	New Orleans Saints	W 31–19	1–0	University of Phoenix Stadium	Recap
2	September 20	at Chicago Bears	W 48–23	2–0	Soldier Field	Recap
3	September 27	San Francisco 49ers	W 47–7	3–0	University of Phoenix Stadium	Recap
4	October 4	St. Louis Rams	L 22–24	3–1	University of Phoenix Stadium	Recap
5	October 11	at Detroit Lions	W 42–17	4–1	Ford Field	Recap
6	October 18	at Pittsburgh Steelers	L 13–25	4–2	Heinz Field	Recap
7	October 26	Baltimore Ravens	W 26–18	5–2	University of Phoenix Stadium	Recap
8	November 1	at Cleveland Browns	W 34–20	6–2	FirstEnergy Stadium	Recap
9	Bye					
10	November 15	at Seattle Seahawks	W 39–32	7–2	CenturyLink Field	Recap
11	November 22	Cincinnati Bengals	W 34–31	8–2	University of Phoenix Stadium	Recap
12	November 29	at San Francisco 49ers	W 19–13	9–2	Levi's Stadium	Recap
13	December 6	at St. Louis Rams	W 27–3	10–2	Edward Jones Dome	Recap
14	December 10	Minnesota Vikings	W 23–20	11–2	University of Phoenix Stadium	Recap
15	December 20	at Philadelphia Eagles	W 40–17	12–2	Lincoln Financial Field	Recap
16	December 27	Green Bay Packers	W 38–8	13–2	University of Phoenix Stadium	Recap
17	January 3	Seattle Seahawks	L 6–36	13–3	University of Phoenix Stadium	Recap

== Game summaries ==
=== Regular season ===
==== Week 1: vs. New Orleans Saints ====
Week One: New Orleans Saints at Arizona Cardinals – Game summary

Quarter	1	2	3	4	Total
Saints	3	7	3	6	19
Cardinals	7	7	3	14	31

at University of Phoenix Stadium, Glendale, Arizona

- Date: September 13
- Game time: 1:05 pm. MST
- Game weather: Played indoors (retractable roof closed)
- Game attendance: 62,903
- Referee: Walt Anderson
- TV announcers (Fox): Kevin Burkhardt, John Lynch and Pam Oliver
- Recap, Gamebook

Game information

First quarter

- ARI – John Brown 10-yard pass from Carson Palmer (Chandler Catanzaro kick), 9:46. Cardinals 7–0. Drive: 9 plays, 80 yards, 5:14.
- NO – Zach Hocker 37-yard field goal, 3:55. Cardinals 7–3. Drive: 11 plays, 61 yards, 5:51.

Second quarter

- ARI – Andre Ellington 1-yard run (Chandler Catanzaro kick), 11:03. Cardinals 14–3. Drive: 5 plays, 88 yards, 3:04.
- NO – Brandon Coleman 12-yard pass from Drew Brees (Zach Hocker kick), 5:14. Cardinals 14–10. Drive: 12 plays, 80 yards, 5:49.

Third quarter

- NO – Zach Hocker 23-yard field goal, 12:01. Cardinals 14–13. Drive: 5 plays, 71 yards, 2:59.
- ARI – Chandler Catanzaro 43-yard field goal, 0:04. Cardinals 17–13. Drive: 5 plays, 35 yards, 2:11.

Fourth quarter

- NO – Zach Hocker 45-yard field goal, 12:24. Cardinals 17–16. Drive: 9 plays, 53 yards, 2:40.
- ARI – Darren Fells 17-yard pass from Carson Palmer (Chandler Catanzaro kick), 9:48. Cardinals 24–16. Drive: 5 plays, 80 yards, 2:36.
- NO – Zach Hocker 33-yard field goal, 6:45. Cardinals 24–19. Drive: 7 plays, 65 yards, 3:03.
- ARI – David Johnson 55-yard pass from Carson Palmer (Chandler Catanzaro kick), 1:33. Cardinals 31–19. Drive: 2 plays, 57 yards, 0:16.

Top passers

- NO – Drew Brees – 30/48, 355 Yds, 1 TD, 1 INT
- ARI – Carson Palmer – 19/32, 307 yards, 3 TD

Top rushers

- NO – Mark Ingram II – 9 Rush, 24 Yds
- ARI – Andre Ellington – 12 Rush, 69 Yds, TD

Top receivers

- NO – Mark Ingram II – 8 Rec, 98 Yds
- ARI – Larry Fitzgerald – 6 Rec, 87 Yds

Turnovers

- NO – 1
- ARI – 1

With the win, the Cardinals began their season at 1–0.

==== Week 2: at Chicago Bears ====
Week Two: Arizona Cardinals at Chicago Bears – Game summary

Quarter	1	2	3	4	Total
Cardinals	14	14	14	6	48
Bears	7	13	3	0	23

at Soldier Field, Chicago, Illinois

- Date: September 20
- Game time: 12:00 p.m CDT/10:00 am. MST
- Game weather: 70 °F (21 °C), mostly sunny
- Game attendance: 62,351
- Referee: Jerome Boger
- TV announcers (Fox): Thom Brennaman, Charles Davis and Tony Siragusa
- Preview, Gamebook

Game information

First quarter

- ARI – David Johnson 108-yard kickoff return (Chandler Catanzaro kick), 14:47. Cardinals 7–0.
- CHI – Joshua Bellamy 48-yard pass from Jay Cutler (Robbie Gould kick), 3:20. Tied 7–7. Drive: 6 plays, 89 yards, 3:02.
- ARI – Jaron Brown 6-yard pass from Carson Palmer (Chandler Catanzaro kick), 1:13. Cardinals 14–7. Drive: 6 plays, 65 yards, 2:07

Second quarter

- CHI – Jeremy Langford 1-yard run, (Robbie Gould kick), 10:02. Tied 14–14. Drive: 11 plays, 80 yards, 6:11
- ARI – Larry Fitzgerald 8-yard pass from Carson Palmer (Chandler Catanzaro kick), 3:51. Cardinals 21–14. Drive: 9 plays, 80 yards, 6:11
- ARI – Tony Jefferson 26-yard interception return (Chandler Catanzaro kick), 2:59. Cardinals 28–14.
- CHI – Robbie Gould 40-yard field goal, 0:59. Cardinals 28–17. Drive: 4 plays, 0 yards, 0:16
- CHI – Robbie Gould 23-yard field goal, 0:01. Cardinals 28–20. Drive: 4 plays, 7 yards, 0:54

Third quarter

- ARI – Larry Fitzgerald 28-yard pass from Carson Palmer (Chandler Catanzaro kick), 12:41. Cardinals 35–20. Drive: 2 plays, 32 yards, 0:52
- ARI – David Johnson 13-yard run (Chandler Catanzaro kick), 6:06. Cardinals 42–20. Drive: 8 plays, 75 yards, 4:23
- CHI – Robbie Gould 51-yard field goal, 2:26. Cardinals 42–23. Drive: 7 plays, 47 yards, 3:40

Fourth quarter

- ARI – Larry Fitzgerald 9-yard pass from Carson Palmer (kick failed), 2:42. Cardinals 48–23. Drive: 9 plays, 46 yards, 5:04

Top passers

- ARI – Carson Palmer – 17/24, 185 Yds, 4 TD, 1 INT
- CHI – Jimmy Clausen – 14/23, 121 Yds, 1 INT

Top rushers

- ARI – Chris Johnson – 20 Rush, 72 Yds
- CHI – Matt Forte – 15 Rush, 61 Yds

Top receivers

- ARI – Larry Fitzgerald – 8 Rec, 112 Yds, 3 TD
- CHI – Joshua Bellamy – 1 Rec, 48 Yds, 1 TD

Turnovers

- ARI – 2
- CHI – 2

With the win, the Cardinals improved to 2–0. Bears QB Jay Cutler was injured during the game, left with a hamstring injury.

==== Week 3: vs. San Francisco 49ers ====
Week Three: San Francisco 49ers at Arizona Cardinals – Game summary

Quarter	1	2	3	4	Total
49ers	0	7	0	0	7
Cardinals	14	17	9	7	47

at University of Phoenix Stadium, Glendale, Arizona

- Date: September 27
- Game time: 1:05 pm. MST
- Game weather: Played indoors (retractable roof closed)
- Game attendance: 63,663
- Referee: Tony Corrente
- TV announcers (Fox): Thom Brennaman, Charles Davis and Tony Siragusa
- Recap, Gamebook

Game information

First quarter

- ARI – Justin Bethel 21-yard interception return (Chandler Catanzaro kick), 11:06. Cardinals 7–0.
- ARI – Tyrann Mathieu 33-yard interception return (Chandler Catanzaro kick), 9:03. Cardinals 14–0.

Second quarter

- ARI – Chris Johnson 6-yard run (Chandler Catanzaro kick), 14:56. Cardinals 21–0. Drive: 10 plays, 81 yards, 5:58.
- ARI – Chris Johnson 1-yard run (Chandler Catanzaro kick), 7:49. Cardinals 28–0. Drive: 9 plays, 81 yards, 4:04.
- SF – Colin Kaepernick 12-yard run (Phil Dawson kick), 2:03. Cardinals 28–7. Drive: 3 plays, 19 yards, 1:05.
- ARI – Chandler Catanzaro 22-yard field goal, 0:00. Cardinals 31–7. Drive: 5 plays, 21 yards, 0:30.

Third quarter

- ARI – Larry Fitzgerald 4-yard pass from Carson Palmer (Chandler Catanzaro kick), 12:29. Cardinals 38–7. Drive: 4 plays, 58 yards, 2:18.
- ARI – Carlos Hyde tackled by Kevin Minter in the end zone for a safety, 4:18. Cardinals 40–7.

Fourth quarter

- ARI – Larry Fitzgerald 8-yard pass from Carson Palmer (Chandler Catanzaro kick), 5:15. Cardinals 47–7. Drive: 13 plays, 79 yards, 7:42.

Top passers

- SF – Colin Kaepernick – 9/19, 67 Yds, 4 INT
- ARI – Carson Palmer – 20/32, 311 Yds, 2 TD, 1 INT

Top rushers

- SF – Colin Kaepernick – 7 Rush, 46 Yds, 1 TD
- ARI – Chris Johnson – 22 Rush, 110 Yds, 2 TD

Top receivers

- SF – Garrett Celek – 3 Rec, 29 Yds
- ARI – Larry Fitzgerald – 9 Rec, 134 Yds, 2 TD

Turnovers

- SF – 4
- ARI – 1

49ers quarterback Colin Kaepernick threw 4 interceptions in this game, with 2 of them being returned for touchdowns. Overall, the Cardinals dominated the game on both sides of the ball with a solid 47-7 win. With the win, the Cardinals improved to 3–0 for the second straight season.

The 47 points scored by the Cardinals set a new franchise record in points scored over the San Francisco 49ers in a single game.

==== Week 4: vs. St. Louis Rams ====
Week Four: St. Louis Rams at Arizona Cardinals – Game summary

Quarter	1	2	3	4	Total
Rams	7	3	7	7	24
Cardinals	3	6	3	10	22

at University of Phoenix Stadium, Glendale, Arizona

- Date: October 4
- Game time: 1:25 pm. MST
- Game weather: Played indoors (retractable roof closed)
- Game attendance: 63,146
- Referee: John Parry
- TV announcers (Fox): Thom Brennaman, Charles Davis and Tony Siragusa
- Recap, Gamebook

Game information

First quarter

- STL – Tavon Austin 12-yard pass from Nick Foles (Greg Zuerlein kick), 13:24. Rams 7–0. Drive: 3 plays, 17 yards, 1:29.
- ARI – Chandler Catanzaro 21-yard field goal, 4:13. Rams 7–3. Drive: 8 plays, 62 yards, 4:19.

Second quarter

- ARI – Chandler Catanzaro 27-yard field goal, 10:45. Rams 7–6. Drive: 13 plays, 51 yards, 6:29.
- STL – Greg Zuerlein 30-yard field goal, 3:16. Rams 10–6. Drive: 7 plays, 68 yards, 3:34.
- ARI – Chandler Catanzaro 42-yard field goal, 1:13. Rams 10–9. Drive: 9 plays, 56 yards, 2:03.

Third quarter

- STL – Stedman Bailey 18-yard pass from Nick Foles (Greg Zuerlein kick), 5:44. Rams 17–9. Drive: 5 plays, 58 yards, 2:52.
- ARI – Chandler Catanzaro 38-yard field goal, 1:13. Rams 17–12. Drive: 9 plays, 60 yards, 4:31.

Fourth quarter

- ARI – Chandler Catanzaro 29-yard field goal, 11:57. Rams 17–15. Drive: 6 plays, 41 yards, 2:55.
- STL – Tavon Austin 12-yard pass from Nick Foles (Greg Zuerlein kick), 8:16. Rams 24–15. Drive: 6 plays, 80 yards, 3:41.
- ARI – David Johnson 23-yard pass from Carson Palmer (Chandler Catanzaro kick), 4:38. Rams 24–22. Drive: 8 plays, 80 yards, 3:38.

Top passers

- STL – Nick Foles – 16/24, 171 Yds, 3 TD
- ARI – Carson Palmer – 29/46, 352 Yds, 1 TD, 1 INT

Top rushers

- STL – Todd Gurley – 19 Rush, 146 Yds
- ARI – Chris Johnson – 16 Rush, 83 Yds

Top receivers

- STL – Tavon Austin- 6 Rec, 96 Yds, 2 TD
- ARI – Larry Fitzgerald – 7 Rec, 99 Yds

Turnovers

- STL – 0
- ARI – 3

The Cardinals were plagued by mistakes until well into the second half of the game. They committed 3 turnovers to St. Louis' 0 and were ultimately handed their first loss of the season.

==== Week 5: at Detroit Lions ====
Week Five: Arizona Cardinals at Detroit Lions – Game summary

Quarter	1	2	3	4	Total
Cardinals	0	28	7	7	42
Lions	7	0	0	10	17

at Ford Field, Detroit, Michigan

- Date: October 11
- Game time: 3:05 p.m CDT/1:05 pm. MST
- Game weather: Played indoors (dome stadium)
- Game attendance: 60,816
- Referee: Gene Steratore
- TV announcers (Fox): Justin Kutcher, Daryl Johnston and Holly Sonders
- Preview, Gamebook

Game information

First quarter

- DET – Theo Riddick 6-yard pass from Matthew Stafford (Matt Prater kick), 2:21. Lions 7–0. Drive: 7 plays, 82 yards, 3:48.

Second quarter

- ARI – Darren Fells 14-yard pass from Carson Palmer (Chandler Catanzaro kick), 14:55. Tied 7–7. Drive: 5 plays, 71 yards, 2:26.
- ARI – David Johnson 4-yard run (Chandler Catanzaro kick), 10:56. Cardinals 14–7. Drive: 1 play, 4 yards, 0:05.
- ARI – David Johnson 2-yard run (Chandler Catanzaro kick), 3:11. Cardinals 21–7. Drive: 5 plays, 99 yards, 2:25.
- ARI – John Brown 18-yard pass from Carson Palmer (Chandler Catanzaro kick), 2:08. Cardinals 28–7. Drive: 3 plays, 22 yards, 0:47.

Third quarter

- ARI – Larry Fitzgerald 2-yard pass from Carson Palmer (Chandler Catanzaro kick), 6:27. Cardinals 35–7. Drive: 5 plays, 32 yards, 3:47.

Fourth quarter

- DET – Matt Prater 40-yard field goal, 11:51. Cardinals 35–10. Drive: 10 plays, 60 yards, 2:13.
- ARI – Andre Ellington 63-yard run (Chandler Catanzaro kick), 10:20. Cardinals 42–10. Drive: 3 plays, 80 yards, 1:31.
- DET – Lance Moore 13-yard pass from Dan Orlovsky (Matt Prater kick), 1:29. Cardinals 42–17. Drive: 15 plays, 86 yards, 3:50.

Top passers

- ARI – Carson Palmer – 11/14, 161 Yds, 3 TD
- DET – Dan Orlovsky – 21/38, 191 Yds, 1 TD, 1 INT

Top rushers

- ARI – Chris Johnson – 11 Rush, 103 Yds
- DET – Zach Zenner – 10 Rush, 30 Yds

Top receivers

- ARI – John Brown – 4 Rec, 73 Yds, 1 TD
- DET – Theo Riddick – 10 Rec, 53 Yds, 1 TD

Turnovers

- ARI – 0
- DET – 6

Detroit starting QB Matthew Stafford was benched after throwing 3 interceptions, part of a 6-turnover game by Detroit that quickly got out of hand for the Lions. Carson Palmer completed the game with a QB rating of 154.2, which was the second highest in his career as the Cardinals finished 4-1.

==== Week 6: at Pittsburgh Steelers ====
Week Six: Arizona Cardinals at Pittsburgh Steelers – Game summary

Quarter	1	2	3	4	Total
Cardinals	7	3	0	3	13
Steelers	0	3	12	10	25

at Heinz Field, Pittsburgh, Pennsylvania

- Date: October 18
- Game time: 1:00 pm. EDT/10:00 am. MST
- Game weather: 45 °F (7 °C), mostly cloudy
- Game attendance: 63,846
- Referee: Ed Hochuli
- TV announcers (Fox): Thom Brennaman, Troy Aikman and Peter Schrager
- Recap, Gamebook

Game information

First quarter

- ARI – Michael Floyd 3-yard pass from Carson Palmer (Chandler Catanzaro kick), 8:17. Cardinals 7–0. Drive: 6 plays, 47 yards, 2:57.

Second quarter

- PIT – Chris Boswell 47-yard field goal, 6:06. Cardinals 7–3. Drive: 5 plays, 34 yards, 3:12.
- ARI – Chandler Catanzaro 31-yard field goal, 0:47. Cardinals 10–3. Drive: 13 plays, 68 yards, 5:19.

Third quarter

- PIT – Chris Boswell 48-yard field goal, 11:14. Cardinals 10–6. Drive: 7 plays, 31 yards, 3:46.
- PIT – Martavis Bryant 8-yard pass from Landry Jones (pass failed), 8:45. Steelers 12–10. Drive: 4 plays, 32 yards, 1:36.
- PIT – Chris Boswell 51-yard field goal, 2:32. Steelers 15–10. Drive: 7 plays, 26 yards, 3:28.

Fourth quarter

- ARI – Chandler Catanzaro 39-yard field goal, 14:56. Steelers 15–13. Drive: 6 plays, 61 yards, 2:36.
- PIT – Chris Boswell 28-yard field goal, 7:19. Steelers 18–13. Drive: 13 plays, 68 yards, 7:37.
- PIT – Martavis Bryant 88-yard pass from Landry Jones (Chris Boswell kick), 1:58. Steelers 25–13. Drive: 2 plays, 90 yards, 0:22.

Top passers

- ARI – Carson Palmer – 29/45, 421 Yds, 1 TD, 2 INT
- PIT – Landry Jones – 8/12, 168 Yds, 2 TD

Top rushers

- ARI – Chris Johnson – 14 Rushes, 40 Yds
- PIT – Le'Veon Bell – 24 Rushes, 88 Yds

Top receivers

- ARI – John Brown – 10 Rec, 196 Yds
- PIT – Martavis Bryant- 6 Rec, 137 Yds, 2 TD

Turnovers

- ARI – 3
- PIT – 0

For the first time in 4 years, head coach Bruce Arians made his first return to Pittsburgh, where he served as part of the offensive coaching staff from 2004 to 2011 and had been responsible for three Super Bowl appearances during his tenure. The Steelers were led by backup quarterbacks due to Ben Roethlisberger's knee injury 3 weeks prior. Michael Vick, who received the start, was held in check by the Cardinals defense until he left with a hamstring injury. Third-string QB Landry Jones entered the game in the third quarter and rallied the Steelers to a win following costly mistakes by Carson Palmer.

With the loss, the Cardinals fell to 4–2. This would turn out to be the Cardinals' only road loss of the regular season, as well as the final game played by QB Michael Vick.

==== Week 7: vs. Baltimore Ravens ====
Week Seven: Baltimore Ravens at Arizona Cardinals – Game summary

Quarter	1	2	3	4	Total
Ravens	3	7	0	8	18
Cardinals	7	7	6	6	26

at University of Phoenix Stadium, Glendale, Arizona

- Date: October 26
- Game time: 5:30 pm. MST
- Game weather: Played indoors (retractable roof closed)
- Game attendance: 64,722
- Referee: Ron Torbert
- TV announcers (ESPN): Mike Tirico, Jon Gruden and Lisa Salters
- Recap, Gamebook

Game information

First quarter

- BAL – Justin Tucker 44-yard field goal, 5:25. Ravens 3–0. Drive: 8 plays, 29 yards, 5:27.
- ARI – Chris Johnson 26-yard run (Chandler Catanzaro kick), 3:59. Cardinals 7–3. Drive: 3 plays, 80 yards, 1:26.

Second quarter

- BAL – Justin Forsett 14-yard run (Justin Tucker kick), 3:54. Ravens 10–7. Drive: 8 plays, 84 yards, 4:45.
- ARI – Michael Floyd 3-yard pass from Carson Palmer (Chandler Catanzaro kick), 1:01. Cardinals 14–10. Drive: 5 plays, 12 yards, 1:47.

Third quarter

- ARI – Chandler Catanzaro 21-yard field goal, 9:47. Cardinals 17–10. Drive: 7 plays, 46 yards, 3:07.
- ARI – Chandler Catanzaro 21-yard field goal, 2:27. Cardinals 20–10. Drive: 8 plays, 84 yards, 3:58.

Fourth quarter

- ARI – John Brown 4-yard pass from Carson Palmer (kick failed), 8:08. Cardinals 26–10. Drive: 11 plays, 79 yards, 6:08.
- BAL – Kyle Juszczyk 1-yard pass from Joe Flacco (Nick Boyle pass from Joe Flacco), 4:26. Cardinals 26–18. Drive: 1 play, 1 yard, 0:05.

Top passers

- BAL – Joe Flacco – 26/40, 252 Yds, 1 TD, 1 INT
- ARI – Carson Palmer – 20/29, 275 Yds, 2 TD

Top rushers

- BAL – Justin Forsett – 12 Rush, 36 Yds, 1 TD
- ARI – Chris Johnson – 18 Rushes, 122 Yds, 1 TD

Top receivers

- BAL – Steve Smith, Sr.- 5 Rec, 78 Yds
- ARI – John Brown – 4 Rec, 65 Yds, 1 TD

Turnovers

- BAL – 2
- ARI – 0

With the win, the Cardinals improved to 5–2.

==== Week 8: at Cleveland Browns ====
Week Eight: Arizona Cardinals at Cleveland Browns – Game summary

Quarter	1	2	3	4	Total
Cardinals	7	3	14	10	34
Browns	7	13	0	0	20

at FirstEnergy Stadium, Cleveland, Ohio

- Date: November 1
- Game time: 1:00 p.m. EST/11:00 a.m. MST
- Game weather: 62 °F (17 °C), sunny
- Game attendance: 67,431
- Referee: Walt Coleman
- TV announcers (Fox): Matt Smith, Chris Cooley and Danielle Trotta
- Recap, Gamebook

Game information

First quarter

- ARI – Troy Niklas 11-yard pass from Carson Palmer (Chandler Catanzaro kick), 7:59. Cardinals 7–0. Drive: 11 plays, 82 yards, 7:01.
- CLE – Brian Hartline 10-yard pass from Josh McCown (Travis Coons kick), 2:41. Tied 7–7. Drive: 3 plays, 9 yards, 0:55.

Second quarter

- CLE – Gary Barnidge 3-yard pass from Josh McCown (Travis Coons kick), 14:48. Browns 14–7. Drive: 6 plays, 66 yards, 2:05.
- CLE – Brian Hartline 2-yard pass from Josh McCown (kick failed), 4:56. Browns 20–7. Drive: 14 plays, 72 yards, 7:32.
- ARI – Chandler Catanzaro 37-yard field goal, 0:00. Browns 20–10. Drive: 4 plays, 31 yards, 0:24.

Third quarter

- ARI – Michael Floyd 60-yard pass from Carson Palmer (Chandler Catanzaro kick), 11:46. Browns 20–17. Drive: 4 plays, 71 yards, 2:04.
- ARI – Troy Niklas 1-yard pass from Carson Palmer (Chandler Catanzaro kick), 7:35. Cardinals 24–20. Drive: 4 plays, 48 yards, 1:50.

Fourth quarter

- ARI – Larry Fitzgerald 6-yard pass from Carson Palmer (Chandler Catanzaro kick), 9:32. Cardinals 31–20. Drive: 12 plays, 80 yards, 5:20.
- ARI – Chandler Catanzaro 35-yard field goal, 2:16. Cardinals 34–20. Drive: 12 plays, 43 yards, 5:17.

Top passers

- ARI – Carson Palmer – 23/38, 374 yards, 4 TD, 1 INT
- CLE – Josh McCown – 18/34, 211 yards, 3 TD, 1 INT

Top rushers

- ARI – Chris Johnson – 30 rushes, 109 yards
- CLE – Josh McCown – 5 rushes, 18 yards

Top receivers

- ARI – Michael Floyd – 4 receptions, 106 yards, 1 TD
- CLE – Gary Barnidge – 7 receptions, 53 yards, 1 TD

Turnovers

- ARI – 4
- CLE – 2

The Cardinals would trail 20–10 at halftime, but they would come back to win 34–20 behind a 300-yard passing, 4-touchdown game from Carson Palmer.

With the comeback victory, the Cards improved to 6–2.

==== Week 10: at Seattle Seahawks ====
Week Ten: Arizona Cardinals at Seattle Seahawks – Game summary

Quarter	1	2	3	4	Total
Cardinals	0	22	3	14	39
Seahawks	0	7	10	15	32

at CenturyLink Field, Seattle, Washington

- Date: November 15
- Game time: 6:30 pm. MST/5:30 p.m. PST
- Game weather: 49 °F (9 °C), partly cloudy
- Game attendance: 69,005
- Referee: Clete Blakeman
- TV announcers (NBC): Al Michaels, Cris Collinsworth and Michele Tafoya
- Recap, Gamebook

Game information

First quarter

- No scoring plays

Second quarter

- ARI – Chandler Catanzaro 33-yard field goal, 12:52. Cardinals 3–0. Drive: 7 plays, 34 yards, 3:03.
- ARI – Russell Wilson tackled in end zone by Frostee Rucker for safety, 12:14. Cardinals 5–0.
- ARI – Michael Floyd 27-yard pass from Carson Palmer (Chandler Catanzaro kick), 6:41. Cardinals 12–0. Drive: 10 plays, 59 yards, 5:33.
- ARI – Michael Floyd 35-yard pass from Carson Palmer (Chandler Catanzaro kick), 4:02. Cardinals 19–0. Drive: 3 plays, 45 yards, 1:23.
- SEA – Will Tukuafu 1-yard run (Stephen Hauschka kick), 1:52. Cardinals 19–7. Drive: 6 plays, 80 yards, 2:10.
- ARI – Chandler Catanzaro 43-yard field goal, 0:00. Cardinals 22–7. Drive: 9 plays, 55 yards, 1:52.

Third quarter

- SEA – Stephen Hauschka 31-yard field goal, 11:18. Cardinals 22–10. Drive: 9 plays, 67 yards, 3:42.
- ARI – Chandler Catanzaro 43-yard field goal, 6:29. Cardinals 25–10. Drive: 4 plays, 11 yards, 1:42.
- SEA – Doug Baldwin 32-yard pass from Russell Wilson (Stephen Hauschka kick), 4:52. Cardinals 25–17. Drive: 3 plays, 69 yards, 1:37.

Fourth quarter

- SEA – Marshawn Lynch 3-yard run (pass failed), 14:44. Cardinals 25–23. Drive: 1 play, 3 yards, 0:05.
- SEA – Bobby Wagner 22-yard defensive fumble return (pass failed), 13:00. Seahawks 29–25.
- ARI – Jermaine Gresham 14-yard pass from Carson Palmer (Chandler Catanzaro kick), 8:41. Cardinals 32–29. Drive: 10 plays, 83 yards, 4:19.
- ARI – Andre Ellington 48-yard run (Chandler Catanzaro kick), 1:58. Cardinals 39–29. Drive: 8 plays, 80 yards, 4:04.
- SEA – Stephen Hauschka 46-yard field goal, 0:58. Cardinals 39–32. Drive: 7 plays, 40 yards, 1:00.

Top passers

- ARI – Carson Palmer – 29/47, 363 Yds, 3 TD, 1 INT
- SEA – Russell Wilson – 14/32, 240 Yds, 1 TD, 1 INT

Top rushers

- ARI – Andre Ellington – 5 Rush, 61 Yds, 1 TD
- SEA – Marshawn Lynch – 8 Rush, 42 Yds, 1 TD

Top receivers

- ARI – Michael Floyd – 7 Rec, 113 Yds, 2 TD
- SEA – Doug Baldwin – 7 Rec, 134 Yds, 1 TD

Turnovers

- ARI – 3
- SEA – 1

Arizona would trail 29–25 in the fourth quarter, but they would outscore Seattle 14–3 in the final 10 minutes. Carson Palmer would throw for 300 yards for the second straight week and threw 3 touchdowns.

With the win, Arizona improved to 7–2.

==== Week 11: vs. Cincinnati Bengals ====
Week Eleven: Cincinnati Bengals at Arizona Cardinals – Game summary

Quarter	1	2	3	4	Total
Bengals	7	7	0	17	31
Cardinals	0	7	21	6	34

at University of Phoenix Stadium, Glendale, Arizona

- Date: November 22
- Game time: 6:30 pm. MST
- Game weather: 72 °F (22 °C), mostly clear – retractable roof open
- Game attendance: 64,745
- Referee: Terry McAulay
- TV announcers (NBC): Al Michaels, Cris Collinsworth and Michele Tafoya
- Recap, Gamebook

Game information

First quarter

- CIN – Tyler Eifert 3-yard pass from Andy Dalton (Mike Nugent kick), 0:22. Bengals 7–0. Drive: 7 plays, 64 yards, 3:08

Second quarter

- ARI – Darren Fells 18-yard pass from Carson Palmer (Chandler Catanzaro kick), 9:44. Tie 7–7. Drive: 10 plays, 80 yards, 5:38
- CIN – Jeremy Hill 3-yard run (Mike Nugent kick), 1:07. Bengals 14–7. Drive: 14 plays, 80 yards, 8:37

Third quarter

- ARI – J. J. Nelson 64-yard pass from Carson Palmer (Chandler Catanzaro kick), 11:21. Tie 14–14. Drive: 4 plays, 80 yards, 1:41
- ARI – John Brown 18-yard pass from Carson Palmer (Chandler Catanzaro kick), 5:32. Cardinals 21–14. Drive: 8 plays, 66 yards, 4:45
- ARI – David Johnson 16-yard pass from Carson Palmer (Chandler Catanzaro kick), 1:26. Cardinals 28–14. Drive: 5 plays, 49 yards, 2:43

Fourth quarter

- CIN – Jeremy Hill 1-yard run (Mike Nugent kick), 11:26. Cardinals 28–21. Drive: 11 plays, 80 yards, 5:00
- ARI – Chandler Catanzaro 24-yard field goal, 6:27. Cardinals 31–21. Drive: 4 plays, 4 yards, 2:14
- CIN – Tyler Eifert 10-yard pass from Andy Dalton (Mike Nugent kick), 3:44. Cardinals 31–28. Drive: 8 plays, 50 yards, 2:43
- CIN – Mike Nugent 43-yard field goal, 1:03. Tie 31–31. Drive: 8 plays, 59 yards, 1:42
- ARI – Chandler Catanzaro 32-yard field goal, 0:02. Cardinals 34–31. Drive: 6 plays, 70 yards, 1:02

Top passers

- CIN – Andy Dalton – 22/39, 315 Yds, 2 TD
- ARI – Carson Palmer – 20/31, 317 Yds, 4 TD, 2 INT

Top rushers

- CIN – Jeremy Hill – 13 Rush, 45 Yds, 2 TD
- ARI – Chris Johnson – 18 Rushes, 63 Yds

Top receivers

- CIN – Giovani Bernard – 8 Rec, 128 Yds
- ARI – J.J. Nelson – 4 Rec, 142 Yds, 1 TD

Turnovers

- CIN – 1
- ARI – 2

The Cardinals would build leads of 28–14 and 31–21 in the third and fourth quarters, but the Bengals would come back to tie the game 31–31 on a Mike Nugent field goal. Arizona would then march down the field to win the shootout on a field goal from Chandler Catanzaro with 1 second left.

With the win, the Cardinals improved to 8–2.

==== Week 12: at San Francisco 49ers ====
Week Twelve: Arizona Cardinals at San Francisco 49ers – Game summary

Quarter	1	2	3	4	Total
Cardinals	3	3	7	6	19
49ers	0	3	10	0	13

at Levi's Stadium, Santa Clara, California

- Date: November 29
- Game time: 2:05 pm. MST/1:05 pm. PST
- Game weather: 54 °F (12 °C), sunny
- Game attendance: 70,799
- Referee: Pete Morelli
- TV announcers (Fox): Chris Myers, Ronde Barber and Jennifer Hale
- Recap, Gamebook

Game information

First quarter

- ARI – Chandler Catanzaro 26-yard field goal, 4:00. Cardinals 3–0. Drive: 8 plays, 31 yards, 3:28.

Second quarter

- ARI – Chandler Catanzaro 41-yard field goal, 12:43. Cardinals 6–0. Drive: 9 plays, 19 yards, 4:12.
- SFO – Phil Dawson 53-yard field goal, 0:00. Cardinals 6–3. Drive: 12 plays, 45 yards, 3:42.

Third quarter

- ARI – David Johnson 1-yard run (Chandler Catanzaro kick), 9:58. Cardinals 13–3. Drive: 9 plays, 76 yards, 5:02.
- SFO – Vance McDonald 8-yard pass from Blaine Gabbert (Phil Dawson kick), 7:34. Cardinals 13–10. Drive: 6 plays, 77 yards, 2:24.
- SFO – Phil Dawson 33-yard field goal, 1:28. Tied 13–13. Drive: 7 plays, 65 yards, 4:10.

Fourth quarter

- ARI – Carson Palmer 8-yard run (kick failed), 2:28. Cardinals 19–13. Drive: 14 plays, 85 yards, 7:57.

Top passers

- ARI – Carson Palmer – 24/40, 271 Yds
- SF – Blaine Gabbert – 25/36, 318 Yds, 1 TD, 1 INT

Top rushers

- ARI – David Johnson – 8 Rush, 21 Yds, 1 TD
- SF – Shaun Draughn – 15 Rush, 51 Yds

Top receivers

- ARI – John Brown – 5 Rec, 99 Yds
- SF – Anquan Boldin – 8 Rec, 93 Yds

Turnovers

- ARI – 0
- SF – 2

With the win, Arizona improved to 9–2 and swept the 49ers for the first time since their 2008 Super Bowl season.

==== Week 13: at St. Louis Rams ====
Week Thirteen: Arizona Cardinals at St. Louis Rams – Game summary

Quarter	1	2	3	4	Total
Cardinals	7	3	14	3	27
Rams	0	0	3	0	3

at Edward Jones Dome, St. Louis, Missouri

- Date: December 6
- Game time: 12:00 p.m. CST/11:00 am. MST
- Game weather: Played indoors (dome stadium)
- Game attendance: 51,115
- Referee: Bill Vinovich
- TV announcers (Fox): Chris Myers, Ronde Barber and Jennifer Hale
- Recap, Gamebook

Game information

First quarter

- ARI – J.J. Nelson 22-yard pass from Carson Palmer (Chandler Catanzaro kick), 10:07. Cardinals 7–0. Drive: 10 plays, 80 yards, 4:53.

Second quarter

- ARI – Chandler Catanzaro 33-yard field goal, 0:06. Cardinals 10–0. Drive: 8 plays, 45 yards, 0:54.

Third quarter

- STL – Zach Hocker 35-yard field goal, 11:30. Cardinals 10–3. Drive: 5 plays, 34 yards, 1:12.
- ARI – David Johnson 10-yard pass from Carson Palmer (Chandler Catanzaro kick), 5:53. Cardinals 17–3. Drive: 10 plays, 98 yards, 5:37.
- ARI – Kerwynn Williams 35-yard run (Chandler Catanzaro kick), 1:30. Cardinals 24–3. Drive: 7 plays, 81 yards, 2:48.

Fourth quarter

- ARI – Chandler Catanzaro 29-yard field goal, 4:09. Cardinals 27–3. Drive: 9 plays, 85 yards, 4:38.

Top passers

- ARI – Carson Palmer – 26/40, 356 Yds, 2 TD
- STL – Nick Foles – 15/35, 146 Yds, 1 INT

Top rushers

- ARI – David Johnson – 22 Rushes, 99 Yds
- STL – Todd Gurley – 9 Rushes, 41 Yds

Top receivers

- ARI – John Brown – 6 Rec, 113 Yds
- STL – Kenny Britt – 2 Rec, 41 Yds

Turnovers

- ARI – 0
- STL – 1

With the win, the Cardinals improved to 10–2.

==== Week 14: vs. Minnesota Vikings ====
Week Fourteen: Minnesota Vikings at Arizona Cardinals – Game summary

Quarter	1	2	3	4	Total
Vikings	7	3	0	10	20
Cardinals	10	0	7	6	23

at University of Phoenix Stadium, Glendale, Arizona

- Date: December 10
- Game time: 6:30 pm. MST
- Game weather: 68 °F (20 °C), mostly clear – retractable roof open
- Game attendance: 64,784
- Referee: Gene Steratore
- TV announcers (NFLN): Jim Nantz, Phil Simms and Tracy Wolfson
- Recap, Gamebook

Game information

First quarter

- ARI – Chandler Catanzaro 27-yard field goal, 7:23. Cardinals 3–0. Drive: 14 plays, 71 yards, 7:37.
- MIN – Adrian Peterson 9-yard run (Blair Walsh kick), 3:57. Vikings 7–3. Drive: 7 plays, 80 yards, 3:26.
- ARI – John Brown 65-yard pass from Carson Palmer (Chandler Catanzaro kick), 1:43. Cardinals 10–7. Drive: 5 plays, 80 yards, 2:14.

Second quarter

- MIN – Blair Walsh 44-yard field goal, 0:02. Tied 10–10. Drive: 10 plays, 54 yards, 3:42.

Third quarter

- ARI – Michael Floyd 42-yard pass from Carson Palmer (Chandler Catanzaro kick), 8:31. Cardinals 17–10. Drive: 6 plays, 57 yards, 2:49.

Fourth quarter

- ARI – Chandler Catanzaro 23-yard field goal, 14:55. Cardinals 20–10. Drive: 16 plays, 66 yards, 7:13.
- MIN – Blair Walsh 54-yard field goal, 12:10. Cardinals 20–13. Drive: 8 plays, 28 yards, 2:45.
- MIN – Mike Wallace 7-yard pass from Teddy Bridgewater (Blair Walsh kick), 4:55. Tied 20–20. Drive: 11 plays, 88 yards, 5:10.
- ARI – Chandler Catanzaro 47-yard field goal, 1:23. Cardinals 23–20. Drive: 11 plays, 55 yards, 3:32.

Top passers

- MIN – Teddy Bridgewater – 25/36, 335 Yds, 1 TD
- ARI – Carson Palmer – 25/35, 310 Yds, 2 TD

Top rushers

- MIN – Adrian Peterson – 23 Rush, 69 Yds, 1 TD
- ARI – David Johnson – 19 Rush, 92 Yds

Top receivers

- MIN – Kyle Rudolph – 6 Rec, 67 Yds
- ARI – Michael Floyd – 5 Rec, 102 Yds, 1 TD

Turnovers

- MIN – 3
- ARI – 0

With their seventh straight win, the Cardinals improved to 11–2 and clinched a spot in the NFL playoffs.

==== Week 15: at Philadelphia Eagles ====
Week Fifteen: Arizona Cardinals at Philadelphia Eagles – Game summary

Quarter	1	2	3	4	Total
Cardinals	7	10	13	10	40
Eagles	3	7	0	7	17

at Lincoln Financial Field, Philadelphia, Pennsylvania

- Date: December 20
- Game time: 8:30 pm. EST/6:30 pm. MST
- Game weather: 37 °F (3 °C), partly cloudy
- Game attendance: 69,596
- Referee: Tony Corrente
- TV announcers (NBC): Al Michaels, Cris Collinsworth and Michele Tafoya
- Recap, Gamebook

Game information

First quarter

- ARI – David Johnson 1-yard run (Chandler Catanzaro kick), 10:44. Cardinals 7–0. Drive: 8 plays, 78 yards, 4:16.
- PHI – Caleb Sturgis 36-yard field goal, 6:00. Cardinals 7–3. Drive: 12 plays, 56 yards, 4:44.

Second quarter

- ARI – Chandler Catanzaro 28-yard field goal, 14:08. Cardinals 10–3. Drive: 13 plays, 73 yards, 6:52.
- PHI – Zach Ertz 22-yard pass from Sam Bradford (Caleb Sturgis kick), 8:26. Tied 10–10. Drive: 4 plays, 53 yards, 1:55.
- ARI – David Johnson 47-yard run (Chandler Catanzaro kick), 4:00. Cardinals 17–10. Drive: 3 plays, 67 yards, 1:23.

Third quarter

- ARI – David Johnson 1-yard run (kick failed), 9:48. Cardinals 23–10. Drive: 8 plays, 87 yards, 4:12.
- ARI – John Brown 16-yard pass from Carson Palmer (Chandler Catanzaro kick), 0:40. Cardinals 30–10. Drive: 5 plays, 50 yards, 2:44.

Fourth quarter

- ARI – Deone Bucannon 39-yard interception return (Chandler Catanzaro kick), 14:50. Cardinals 37–10.
- PHI – Jordan Matthews 78-yard pass from Sam Bradford (Caleb Sturgis kick), 14:32. Cardinals 37–17. Drive: 1 play, 73 yards, 0:18.
- ARI – Chandler Catanzaro 38-yard field goal, 2:55. Cardinals 40–17. Drive: 10 plays, 49 yards, 5:22.

Top passers

- ARI – Carson Palmer – 20/32, 274 Yds, 1 TD
- PHI – Sam Bradford – 28/41, 361 Yds, 2 TD, 2 INT

Top rushers

- ARI – David Johnson – 29 Rush, 187 Yds, 3 TD
- PHI – Ryan Mathews – 11 Rushes, 58 Yds

Top receivers

- ARI – Michael Floyd – 5 Rec, 70 Yds
- PHI – Jordan Matthews- 8 Rec, 159 Yds, 1 TD

Turnovers

- ARI – 0
- PHI – 4

With the win, the Cardinals won 12 games (not including playoffs) in one season for the first time in their 96-year history, clinched the NFC West for the first time since 2009, & clinched a first round bye for the first and so far only time in franchise history. As of 2025, this remains the last time the Cardinals had clinched the NFC West.

==== Week 16: vs. Green Bay Packers ====
Week Sixteen: Green Bay Packers at Arizona Cardinals – Game summary

Quarter	1	2	3	4	Total
Packers	0	0	8	0	8
Cardinals	0	17	21	0	38

at University of Phoenix Stadium, Glendale, Arizona

- Date: December 27
- Game time: 2:25 pm. MST
- Game weather: Played indoors (retractable roof closed)
- Game attendance: 64,878
- Referee: Terry McAulay
- TV announcers (Fox): Joe Buck, Troy Aikman and Erin Andrews
- Recap, Gamebook

Game information

First quarter

- No scoring plays

Second quarter

- ARI – Larry Fitzgerald 3-yard pass from Carson Palmer (Chandler Catanzaro kick), 14:07. Cardinals 7–0. Drive: 7 plays, 50 yards, 3:30.
- ARI – Chandler Catanzaro 19-yard field goal, 5:48. Cardinals 10–0. Drive: 9 plays, 72 yards, 5:02.
- ARI – John Brown 7-yard pass from Carson Palmer (Chander Catanzaro kick), 0:06. Cardinals 17–0. Drive: 7 plays, 80 yards, 0:51.

Third quarter

- ARI – David Johnson 14-yard run (Chandler Catanzaro kick), 14:02. Cardinals 24–0. Drive: 2 plays, 28 yards, 0:47.
- ARI – Cory Redding 36-yard defensive fumble return (Chandler Catanzaro kick), 9:34. Cardinals 31–0.
- GB – Eddie Lacy 28-yard pass from Aaron Rodgers (James Jones pass from Aaron Rodgers), 6:31. Cardinals 31–8. Drive: 8 plays, 80 yards, 3:03.
- ARI – Jerraud Powers 7-yard defensive fumble return (Chandler Catanzaro kick), 3:05. Cardinals 38–8.

Fourth quarter

- No scoring plays

Top passers

- GB – Aaron Rodgers – 15/28, 151 Yds, 1 TD, 1 INT
- ARI – Carson Palmer – 18/27, 265 Yds, 2 TD, 1 INT

Top rushers

- GB – Eddie Lacy – 12 Rush, 60 Yds
- ARI – David Johnson – 9 Rush, 39 Yds, 1 TD

Top receivers

- GB – James Jones – 5 Rec, 46 Yds
- ARI – Michael Floyd – 6 Rec, 111 Yds

Turnovers

- GB – 4
- ARI – 2

A defense forcing 9 sacks and 4 turnovers, including 2 fumbles by Aaron Rodgers that were returned for touchdowns, combined with Carson Palmer throwing for 265 yards, 2 touchdowns and only 1 interception, gave the Cardinals the 38–8 win against the Packers.

With the win, the Cardinals improved to 13–2 and swept the NFC North.

==== Week 17: vs. Seattle Seahawks ====
Week Seventeen: Seattle Seahawks at Arizona Cardinals – Game summary

Quarter	1	2	3	4	Total
Seahawks	10	20	6	0	36
Cardinals	0	6	0	0	6

at University of Phoenix Stadium, Glendale, Arizona

- Date: January 3, 2016
- Game time: 2:25 pm. MST
- Game weather: Played indoors (retractable roof closed)
- Game attendance: 64,646
- Referee: Brad Allen
- TV announcers (Fox): Joe Buck, Troy Aikman and Erin Andrews
- Recap, Gamebook

Game information

First quarter

- SEA – Bryce Brown 1-yard run (Stephen Hauschka kick), 5:22. Seahawks 7–0. 'Drive:
- SEA – Stephen Hauschka 52-yard field goal, 3:08. Seahawks 10–0. 'Drive:

Second quarter

- ARI – Larry Fitzgerald 17-yard pass from Carson Palmer (kick failed), 11:59. Seahawks 10–6. 'Drive:
- SEA – Will Tukuafu 7-yard pass from Russell Wilson (Stephen Hauschka kick), 6:02. Seahawks 17–6. 'Drive:
- SEA – Chase Coffman 8-yard pass from Russell Wilson (Stephen Hauschka kick), 3:51. Seahawks 24–6. 'Drive:
- SEA – Jermaine Kearse 24-yard pass from Russell Wilson (kick failed), 2:08. Seahawks 30–6. 'Drive:

Third quarter

- SEA – Stephen Hauschka 33-yard field goal, 9:39. Seahawks 33–6. 'Drive:
- SEA – Stephen Hauschka 52-yard field goal, 4:49. Seahawks 36–6. 'Drive:

Fourth quarter

- No scoring plays

Top passers

- SEA – Russell Wilson – 19/28, 197 Yds, 3 TD
- ARI – Carson Palmer – 12/25, 129 Yds, 1 TD, 1 INT

Top rushers

- SEA – Christine Michael – 17 Rush, 102 Yds
- ARI – David Johnson – 11 Rush, 25 Yds

Top receivers

- SEA – Doug Baldwin – 5 Rec, 46 Yds
- ARI – Larry Fitzgerald – 6 Rec, 55 Yds, 1 TD

Turnovers

- SEA – 0
- ARI – 3

Against the Seahawks, the Cardinals had a chance to move to the #1 spot in the NFC standings with a win and a Carolina Panthers loss to the Buccaneers. At halftime, down by 24 points (and with Carolina leading Tampa Bay 24–3), notable starters including quarterback Carson Palmer were pulled from the game.

=== Postseason ===
Round	Date	Opponent (seed)	Result	Record	Venue	Recap
Wild Card	First-round bye					
Divisional	January 16, 2016	Green Bay Packers (5)	W 26–20 (OT)	1–0	University of Phoenix Stadium	Recap
NFC Championship	January 24, 2016	at Carolina Panthers (1)	L 15–49	1–1	Bank of America Stadium	Recap

==== NFC Divisional Playoffs: vs. (5) Green Bay Packers ====
NFC Divisional Playoffs: (5) Green Bay Packers at (2) Arizona Cardinals – Game summary

Quarter	1	2	3	4	OT	Total
Packers	0	6	7	7	0	20
Cardinals	7	0	3	10	6	26

at University of Phoenix Stadium, Glendale, Arizona

- Date: January 16, 2016
- Game time: 6:15 p.m. MST
- Game weather: Played indoors (retractable roof closed)
- Game attendance: 65,089
- Referee: Clete Blakeman
- TV announcers (NBC): Al Michaels, Cris Collinsworth and Michele Tafoya
- Recap, Gamebook

Game information

First quarter

- ARI – Michael Floyd 8-yard pass from Carson Palmer (Chandler Catanzaro kick), 6:48. Cardinals 7–0. Drive: 11 plays, 42 yards, 6:21.

Second quarter

- GB – Mason Crosby 28-yard field goal, 11:22. Cardinals 7–3. Drive: 17 plays, 85 yards, 7:31.
- GB – Mason Crosby 34-yard field goal, 0:57. Cardinals 7–6. Drive: 17 plays, 71 yards, 7:55.

Third quarter

- GB – Jeff Janis 8-yard pass from Aaron Rodgers (Mason Crosby kick), 10:17. Packers 13–7. Drive: 6 plays, 81 yards, 3:05.
- ARI – Chandler Catanzaro 28-yard field goal, 5:05. Packers 13–10. Drive: 10 plays, 74 yards, 5:12.

Fourth quarter

- ARI – Michael Floyd 9-yard pass from Carson Palmer (Chandler Catanzaro kick), 3:44. Cardinals 17–13. Drive: 14 plays, 80 yards, 7:09.
- ARI – Chandler Catanzaro 36-yard field goal, 2:00. Cardinals 20–13. Drive: 4 plays, 6 yards, 0:43.
- GB – Jeff Janis 41-yard pass from Aaron Rodgers (Mason Crosby kick), 0:00. Tied 20–20. Drive: 6 plays, 86 yards, 1:55.

Overtime

- ARI – Larry Fitzgerald 5-yard pass from Carson Palmer, 14:00. Cardinals 26–20. Drive: 3 plays, 80 yards, 1:05.

Top passers

- GB – Aaron Rodgers – 24/44, 261 Yds, 2 TD, 1 INT
- ARI – Carson Palmer – 25/41, 349 Yds, 3 TD, 2 INT

Top rushers

- GB – Eddie Lacy – 12 Rush, 89 Yds
- ARI – David Johnson – 15 Rush, 35 Yds

Top receivers

- GB – Jeff Janis – 7 Rec, 145 Yds, 2 TD
- ARI – Larry Fitzgerald – 8 Rec, 176 Yds, 1 TD

In a rematch of week 16, the Cardinals once again faced the Packers. This was the first playoff game between the teams since 2009.

The Cardinals would strike first when Carson Palmer found Michael Floyd for an 8-yard touchdown to put them up 7–0. On Green Bay's first drive, they would go down the field and get a field goal from Mason Crosby from 28 yards out to make the score 7–3. Green Bay would get another field goal before the half to cut the lead to 7–6. The Packers would then get the lead after Jeff Janis caught an 8-yard touchdown pass to give them a 13–7 lead. Arizona would cut the deficit to 13–10 after Chandler Catanzaro kicked a 28-yard field goal. In the fourth quarter, the Cardinals would take the lead after Michael Floyd caught another touchdown that was tipped by Packers cornerback Damarious Randall in the end zone. The Cardinals would get some insurance with 1:55 left after Catanzaro kicked a 36-yard field goal to make it 20–13. The Packers would get the ball back with a chance to tie the game. With 55 seconds left in regulation, the Packers faced a 4th and 20 from their own 4-yard line. Aaron Rodgers would end up throwing a 61-yard pass to Jeff Janis to put the Packers at the Cardinals 35-yard line. Later, with 5 seconds remaining, Rodgers would throw another Hail Mary pass to Janis to tie the game at 20 and force overtime. Rodgers had thrown a successful Hail Mary pass earlier in the season in Week 12, making him the first quarterback in NFL history to throw 2 Hail Marys in the same season.

With the game in overtime, the Cardinals won the toss. On the first play from scrimmage, Palmer threw a 75-yard pass to Larry Fitzgerald to the Packers 4-yard line. Two plays later, Palmer ended the game after he flipped a pass to Fitzgerald on a draw play to end the game and send the Cardinals to the NFC Championship game against number 1 seed Carolina.

With the win, the Cardinals improved to 14–3 and remain the only team in the NFL to be undefeated at home in the playoffs. They advanced to the NFC Championship game for the first time since 2008.

The game is considered one of the greatest playoff games in modern NFL history, with the NFL listing it as the 'most exciting' of the 2015 season. As of 2025, this remains the Cardinals' most recent playoff win.

==== NFC Championship: at (1) Carolina Panthers ====
NFC Championship: (2) Arizona Cardinals at (1) Carolina Panthers– Game summary

Quarter	1	2	3	4	Total
Cardinals	0	7	0	8	15
Panthers	17	7	10	15	49

at Bank of America Stadium, Charlotte, North Carolina

- Date: January 24, 2016
- Game time: 6:40 p.m. EST/4:40 pm. MST
- Game weather: 39 °F (4 °C), clear
- Game attendance: 74,294
- Referee: Bill Vinovich
- TV announcers (Fox): Joe Buck, Troy Aikman, Erin Andrews and Chris Myers
- Recap, Gamebook

Game information

First quarter

- CAR – Graham Gano 45-yard field goal, 9:30. Panthers 3–0. Drive: 8 plays, 39 yards, 3:56.
- CAR – Ted Ginn Jr. 22-yard run (Graham Gano kick), 4:31. Panthers 10–0. Drive: 5 plays, 49 yards, 3:16.
- CAR – Corey Brown 86-yard pass from Cam Newton (Graham Gano kick), 0:49. Panthers 17–0. Drive: 3 plays, 88 yards, 0:59.

Second quarter

- ARI – David Johnson 1-yard run (Chandler Catanzaro kick), 5:44. Panthers 17–7. Drive: 10 plays, 79 yards, 6:03.
- CAR – Cam Newton 1-yard run (Graham Gano kick), 1:56. Panthers 24–7. Drive: 5 plays, 46 yards, 2:49.

Third quarter

- CAR – Graham Gano 21-yard field goal, 7:50. Panthers 27–7. Drive: 11 plays, 80 yards, 7:10.
- CAR – Cam Newton 12-yard rush (Graham Gano kick), 2:08. Panthers 34–7. Drive: 8 plays, 79 yards, 4:11.

Fourth quarter

- ARI – Darren Fells 21-yard pass from Carson Palmer (J.J. Nelson run), 14:16. Panthers 34–15. Drive: 10 plays, 80 yards, 2:52.
- CAR – Devin Funchess 5-yard pass from Cam Newton (Mike Tolbert pass from Cam Newton), 5:26. Panthers 42–15. Drive: 9 plays, 84 yards, 6:12.
- CAR – Luke Kuechly 22-yard interception return (Graham Gano kick), 5:11. Panthers 49–15.

Top passers

- ARI – Carson Palmer – 23/40, 235 Yds, 1 TD, 4 INT
- CAR – Cam Newton – 19/28, 335 Yds, 2 TD, 1 INT

Top rushers

- ARI – David Johnson – 15 Rush, 60 Yds, 1 TD
- CAR – Jonathan Stewart – 19 Rush, 83 Yds

Top receivers

- ARI – David Johnson – 9 Rec, 68 Yds
- CAR – Corey Brown – 4 Rec, 113 Yds, 1 TD

Turnovers

- ARI – 7
- CAR – 1

After the Cardinals called heads to win the coin toss, Carolina dominated the game from start to finish. Carson Palmer threw 4 interceptions, one of which was returned for a touchdown, as the team committed a near-record 7 turnovers, the most turnovers in a conference championship game since the 1978 Rams. The loss ended the Cardinals' season with a final record of 14–4 and denied them a second Super Bowl appearance.

== Standings ==
=== Division ===
NFC West
	W	L	T	PCT	DIV	CONF	PF	PA	STK
^{(2)} Arizona Cardinals	13	3	0	.813	4–2	10–2	489	313	L1
^{(6)} Seattle Seahawks	10	6	0	.625	3–3	7–5	423	277	W1
St. Louis Rams	7	9	0	.438	4–2	6–6	280	330	L1
San Francisco 49ers	5	11	0	.313	1–5	4–8	238	387	W1

=== Conference ===
NFC
#	Team	Division	W	L	T	PCT	DIV	CONF	SOS	SOV	STK
Division Leaders
1	Carolina Panthers	South	15	1	0	.938	5–1	11–1	.441	.438	W1
2	Arizona Cardinals	West	13	3	0	.813	4–2	10–2	.477	.457	L1
3	Minnesota Vikings	North	11	5	0	.688	5–1	8–4	.504	.449	W3
4	Washington Redskins	East	9	7	0	.563	4–2	8–4	.465	.403	W4
Wild Cards
5 (Note: Green Bay finished ahead of Seattle based on head-to-head victory.)	Green Bay Packers	North	10	6	0	.625	3–3	7–5	.531	.450	L2
6	Seattle Seahawks	West	10	6	0	.625	3–3	7–5	.520	.431	W1
Did not qualify for the postseason
7	Atlanta Falcons	South	8	8	0	.500	1–5	5–7	.480	.453	L1
8 (Note: St. Louis and Detroit finished ahead of Philadelphia and New Orleans based on conference record. St. Louis finished ahead of Detroit based on head-to-head victory. Detroit finished ahead of Philadelphia and New Orleans based on head-to-head sweep, while Philadelphia finished ahead of New Orleans based on head-to-head victory.)	St. Louis Rams	West	7	9	0	.438	4–2	6–6	.527	.482	L1
9	Detroit Lions	North	7	9	0	.438	3–3	6–6	.535	.429	W3
10	Philadelphia Eagles	East	7	9	0	.438	3–3	4–8	.508	.473	W1
11	New Orleans Saints	South	7	9	0	.438	3–3	5–7	.504	.402	W2
12 (Note: The New York Giants and Chicago each finished ahead of Tampa Bay based on head-to-head victory, while the Giants finished ahead of Chicago based on conference record.)	New York Giants	East	6	10	0	.375	2–4	4–8	.500	.396	L3
13	Chicago Bears	North	6	10	0	.375	1–5	3–9	.547	.469	L1
14	Tampa Bay Buccaneers	South	6	10	0	.375	3–3	5–7	.484	.406	L4
15	San Francisco 49ers	West	5	11	0	.313	1–5	4–8	.539	.463	W1
16	Dallas Cowboys	East	4	12	0	.250	3–3	3–9	.531	.438	L4
Tiebreakers (Note: When breaking ties for three or more teams under the NFL's rules, they are first broken within divisions, then comparing only the highest-ranked remaining team from each division.)

== Statistics ==
=== Starters ===
==== Regular season ====
Offense

Pos.	Name	GS
QB	Carson Palmer	16
RB	Chris Johnson; David Johnson; Andre Ellington	9; 5; 2
WR1	Larry Fitzgerald	16
WR2	John Brown; Jaron Brown	15; 1
WR3	Michael Floyd; J.J. Nelson	14; 2
TE	Darren Fells; Jermaine Gresham	14; 2
TE	Jermaine Gresham; Troy Niklas	13; 3
LT	Jared Veldheer	16
LG	Mike Iupati; Ted Larsen	13; 3
C	Lyle Sendlein; A.Q. Shipley	15; 1
RG	Jonathan Cooper; Ted Larsen	9; 7
RT	Bobby Massie; Earl Watford	14; 2

Defense

Pos.	Name	GS
DE	Calais Campbell	16
NT	Rodney Gunter	16
DE	Frostee Rucker; Ed Stinson; Xavier Williams	13; 2; 1
OLB	LaMarr Woodley; Dwight Freeney	10; 6
LB	Deone Bucannon	16
LB	Kevin Minter	16
OLB	Alex Okafor; Markus Golden	8; 8
CB	Patrick Peterson	16
SS	Rashad Johnson; Tony Jefferson; D.J. Swearinger	14; 1; 1
FS	Tyrann Mathieu; Tony Jefferson	14; 2
CB	Jerraud Powers; Justin Bethel	13; 3

Special Teams

Pos.	Name	GS
P	Drew Butler	16
K	Chandler Catanzaro	16
LS	Mike Leach	16

==== Postseason ====
Offense

Pos.	Name	GS
QB	Carson Palmer	2
RB	David Johnson	2
WR1	Larry Fitzgerald	2
WR2	John Brown	2
WR3	Michael Floyd	2
TE	Darren Fells	2
TE	Jermaine Gresham	2
LT	Jared Veldheer	2
LG	Mike Iupati	2
C	Lyle Sendlein	2
RG	Ted Larsen	2
RT	Bobby Massie	2

Defense

Pos.	Name	GS
DE	Calais Campbell	2
NT	Rodney Gunter	2
DE	Frostee Rucker	2
OLB	Dwight Freeney	2
LB	Deone Bucannon	2
LB	Kevin Minter	2
OLB	Markus Golden	2
CB	Patrick Peterson	2
SS	Rashad Johnson	2
FS	Tony Jefferson	2
CB	Jerraud Powers	2

Special Teams

Pos.	Name	GS
P	Drew Butler	2
K	Chandler Catanzaro	2
LS	Mike Leach	2

=== Individual leaders ===
Category	Player(s)	Value
Passing yards	Carson Palmer	4,671
Passing touchdowns	Carson Palmer	35
Rushing yards	Chris Johnson	814
Rushing touchdowns	David Johnson	8
Receptions	Larry Fitzgerald	109
Receiving yards	Larry Fitzgerald	1,215
Receiving touchdowns	Larry Fitzgerald	9
Kickoff return yards	David Johnson	598
Kickoff return touchdowns	David Johnson	1
Punt return yards	Patrick Peterson	260
Tackles	Deone Bucannon	112
Sacks	Dwight Freeney	8.0
Forced fumbles	Tony Jefferson; Deone Bucannon; Dwight Freeney	3
Interceptions	Tyrann Mathieu; Rashad Johnson	5
Kicking - field goals	Chandler Catanzaro	28/31, 90.3%
Kicking - extra points	Chandler Catanzaro	53/58, 91.4%

=== Records, milestones, and notable statistics ===
Week 2

- David Johnson set a Cardinals' record with a 108-yard kick return for a touchdown.
- David Johnson also became the first NFL player to have a rushing, receiving, and kick return touchdown in their first two games.

Week 17

- Carson Palmer was a finalist for NFL MVP, coming in 2nd, and receiving 1 vote, which tied him with Tom Brady.

Team

- Most wins in a season in Cardinals history (13 regular season, 14 including playoffs)
- Most points scored in the regular season: 489 points scored (30.6/game)

=== Team rankings ===
Category	Value	NFL rank (out of 32)
Passing attempts	562	
Passing completions	353	19th
Passing yards	4,616	2nd
Passing touchdowns	35	3rd
Interceptions thrown	13	17th
Rushing attempts	452	9th
Rushing yards	1,917	8th
Rushing touchdowns	16	6th
Rushing yards/attempt	4.2	12th
Total yards of offense	6,533	1st
Points scored	489	2nd
Points allowed	313	7th
Passing yards allowed	3,687	8th
Passing touchdowns allowed	24	11th
Rushing attempts against	373	4th
Rushing yards allowed	1,460	6th
Rushing touchdowns allowed	9	8th
Yards/rush attempt allowed	3.9	9th
Interceptions made	19	4th
Fumbles recovered	14	3rd
Total yards allowed	5,147	5th

Statistics correct as of the end of the 2015 NFL season
