= Earl Watford =

American football player (born 1990)

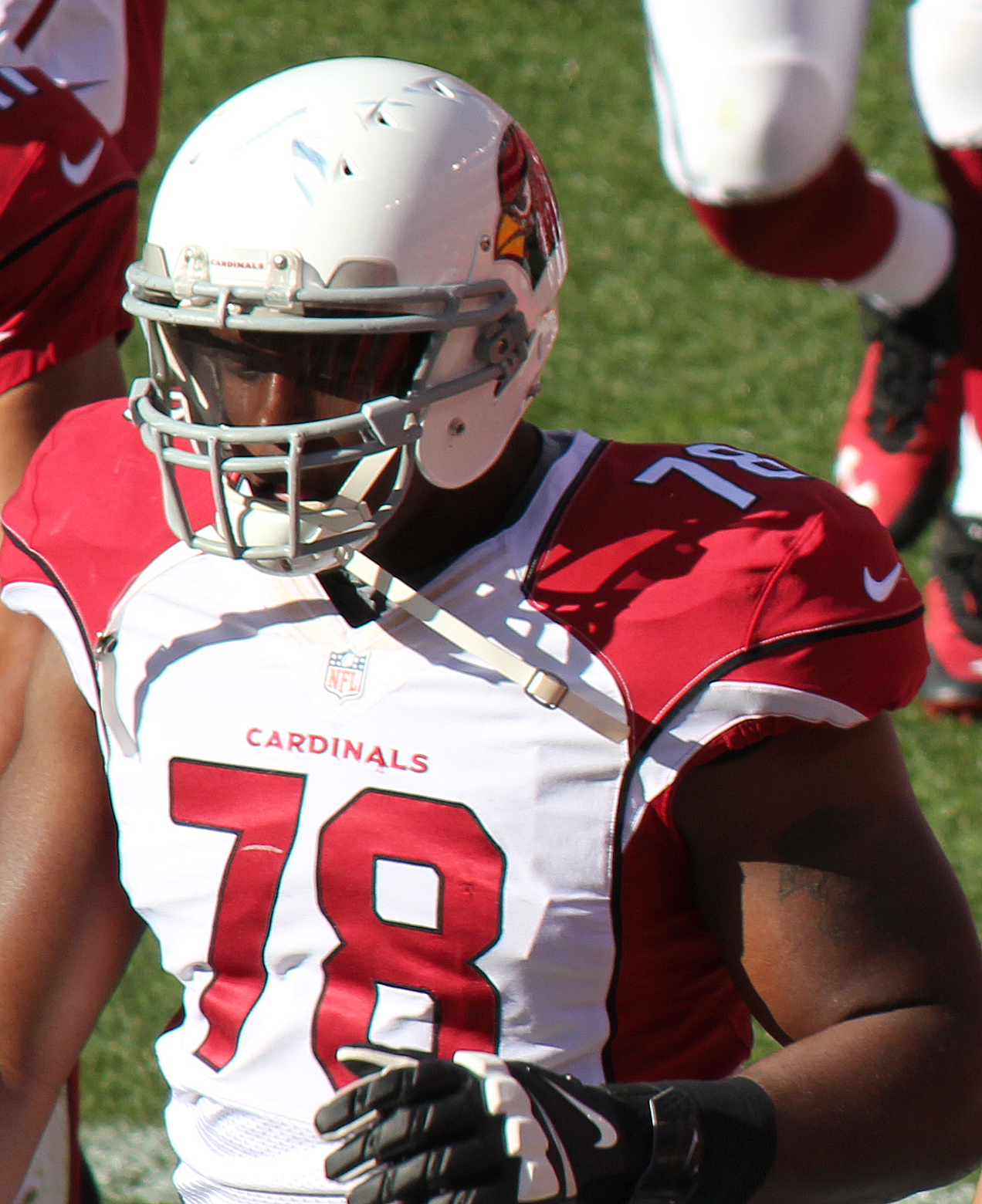
- Watford with the Arizona Cardinals in 2014

No. 78, 71
- Position: Guard

Personal information
- Born: June 24, 1990 (age 36); Philadelphia, Pennsylvania, U.S.
- Listed height: 6 ft 3 in (1.91 m)
- Listed weight: 300 lb (136 kg)

Career information
- High school: Simon Gratz (Philadelphia)
- College: James Madison
- NFL draft: 2013: 4th round, 116th overall pick

Career history
- Arizona Cardinals (2013–2016); Jacksonville Jaguars (2017)*; Arizona Cardinals (2017); Chicago Bears (2018)*; Cleveland Browns (2018); Tampa Bay Buccaneers (2019); New England Patriots (2020)*; Tampa Bay Buccaneers (2020–2021)
- * Offseason or practice squad member only

Awards and highlights
- Super Bowl champion (LV); First-team All-CAA (2011, 2012)

Career NFL statistics
- Games played: 71
- Games started: 25
- Stats at Pro Football Reference

Earl Watford (born June 24, 1990) is an American former professional football player who was a guard in the National Football League (NFL). He played college football for the James Madison Dukes and was selected by the Arizona Cardinals in the fourth round of the 2013 NFL draft.

== Early life ==
He attended Simon Gratz High School in Philadelphia, and played high school football for the Gratz Bulldogs. He was a first-team all-city selection as a senior, and was named to the second-team All-Decade Public Team on the defensive line by the Philadelphia News. Watford did not begin playing football until his junior year and played defensive end for Simon Gratz High School.

== College career ==
Head coach Mickey Matthews stated that the main reason they recruited Watford was his large size. He was originally recruited as a defensive end, but the coaching staff realized he would be better suited to be an offensive linemen.

Watford attended James Madison University in Harrisonburg, Virginia, where he played for the James Madison Dukes football team from 2008 to 2012. He started in 37 games over his college career, and was a first-team All-Colonial Athletic Association (CAA) selection as a junior in 2011, and again as a senior in 2012.

== Professional career ==
=== Pre-draft ===
On January 8, 2013, it was announced that Watford had accepted his invitation to play in the 2013 East–West Shrine Game. On January 19, 2013, Watford played for former Atlanta Falcons' head coach Jerry Glanville's East team that lost 28-13 to the West. Watford was one of 57 collegiate offensive linemen to attend the NFL Scouting Combine in Indianapolis, Indiana. He completed all of the combine drills and finished fifth among all offensive linemen in the vertical and ninth in the 40-yard dash. On March 18, 2013, Watford attended James Madison's pro day, but chose to stand on his combine numbers and only perform positional and blocking drills. During the draft process, attended private workouts and meetings with a few teams, including the Philadelphia Eagles, Cleveland Browns, and Arizona Cardinals. At the conclusion of the pre-draft process, NFL draft experts and scouts projected Watford would be a fourth or fifth round pick. He was ranked the seventh best offensive guard in the draft by NFLDraftScout.com.

Pre-draft measurables
Height	Weight	Arm length	Hand span	40-yard dash	10-yard split	20-yard split	20-yard shuttle	Three-cone drill	Vertical jump	Broad jump	Bench press
6 ft 3 3/8 in (1.91 m)	300 lb (136 kg)	34 in (0.86 m)	10 in (0.25 m)	5.06 s	1.80 s	2.95 s	5.00 s	7.77 s	30 in (0.76 m)	8 ft 11 in (2.72 m)	24 reps
All values from NFL Combine

=== Arizona Cardinals (first stint) ===
==== 2013 ====
The Arizona Cardinals selected Watford in the fourth round (116th overall) of the 2013 NFL draft. Watford was the 14th player ever selected in the NFL draft from James Madison. He also became the fourth highest selection in the school's history. Earlier in the draft, the Arizona Cardinals also selected North Carolina's guard Jonathan Cooper in the first round (seventh overall).

On June 4, 2013, the Cardinals signed Watford to a four-year, $2.59 million contract.

Throughout training camp, Watford competed against Chilo Rachal, Daryn Colledge, Jonathan Cooper, Paul Fanaika, Mike Gibson, and Senio Kelemete for the starting offensive guard role. Head coach Bruce Arians named Watford the backup offensive guard behind starters Daryn College and Paul Fanaika to begin the regular season. Watford spent the entire 2013 season on the bench and was inactive for all 16 regular season games.

==== 2014 ====
The following season, Watford competed against Jonathan Cooper for the vacant starting left guard role after the departure of Daryn College to the Miami Dolphins in free agency. Watford and Cooper were named the backup offensive guards behind starters Paul Fanaika and Ted Larsen to start the regular season.

On September 18, 2014, he made his professional regular season debut during the Arizona Cardinals' 25-14 victory over the New York Giants. He missed five games during the season (Weeks 8-12) after suffering a high ankle sprain. He finished the season with ten games and zero starts as the Arizona Cardinals finished second in the NFC West with an 11-5 record. On January 3, 2015, Watford played in his first career playoff game as the Arizona Cardinals lost to the Carolina Panthers 27-16 in the NFC Wildcard game.

==== 2015 ====
During the off season, the Arizona Cardinals saw the departure of Paul Fanaika, signed free agent guard Mike Iupati, and moved Ted Larsen to center. With Iupati slated as the starting right guard, Watford competed against Jonathan Cooper for the vacant starting left guard position. In an unexpected move, the Arizona Cardinals named Watford the starting right tackle, ahead of Bradley Sowell. He would replace Bobby Massie who was in the midst of serving a two-game suspension after an incident during the week of the Super Bowl.

He made his first career start in the Arizona Cardinals' season-opening 31-19 victory over the New Orleans Saints. On December 8, 2015, the Cardinals placed Watford on injured/reserve after he suffered a hand injury, effectively ending his season. He finished the season with two starts and appeared in eight games. Watford also missed three games during the season (Weeks 6-8).

==== 2016 ====
The Arizona Cardinals signed Evan Mathis to be the starting offensive guard opposite Mike Iupati. Watford competed for a backup guard role against Cole Toner. Head coach Bruce Arians named him the backup left guard to Iupati to start the regular season.

After starting the season in a reserve role, Watford was named the starting right guard for a Week 3 loss at the Buffalo Bills. Evan Mathis was inactive after suffering a foot injury. Watford was named the starting right guard for the rest of the season prior to the Arizona Cardinals' Week 6 victory over the New York Jets. He replaced Evan Mathis in the lineup after Mathis suffered an ankle injury and was placed on injured/reserve for the remainder of the season. He finished the 2016 season with ten starts in 15 games.

=== Jacksonville Jaguars ===
On March 11, 2017, the Jacksonville Jaguars signed Watford to a two-year, $6 million contract that included $750,000 guaranteed and a signing bonus of $250,000.

Throughout training camp, he competed against A. J. Cann and Patrick Omameh for one of the starting guard jobs. Head coach Doug Marrone named Watford the backup to A. J. Cann and Patrick Omameh to start the regular season.

He was released on September 8, 2017.

=== Arizona Cardinals (second stint) ===
On October 2, 2017, the Cardinals signed Watford after starting left guard Mike Iupati suffered a triceps injury and was placed on injured reserve. The terms of his contract were for one-year and $775,000. Upon arrival, he was named the starting right guard with Alex Boone moving to the left. He started Weeks 5-14, was inactive for 15-16, before returning for the season finale. He finished with a total of ten games and nine starts. Pro Football Focus gave him a 36.7 overall grade, but gave him "high quality" marks for run and pass blocking.

=== Chicago Bears ===
On April 3, 2018, Watford signed a one-year contract with the Chicago Bears. He was released on August 26, 2018.

=== Cleveland Browns ===
On August 28, 2018, Watford was signed by the Cleveland Browns.

=== Tampa Bay Buccaneers (first stint) ===
On March 15, 2019, Watford signed a one-year contract with the Tampa Bay Buccaneers.

=== New England Patriots ===
On December 15, 2020, Watford was signed to the New England Patriots practice squad. He was released on December 29, 2020.

=== Tampa Bay Buccaneers (second stint) ===
On January 15, 2021, Watford signed with the Buccaneers. He was waived on January 22, and signed to the team's practice squad on January 27. His practice squad contract with the team expired after the season on February 16, 2021.

On August 12, 2021, Watford re-signed with the Buccaneers. He was placed on injured reserve on September 6, 2021. He was released on September 14.
