= Kevin Minter =

American football player (born 1990)

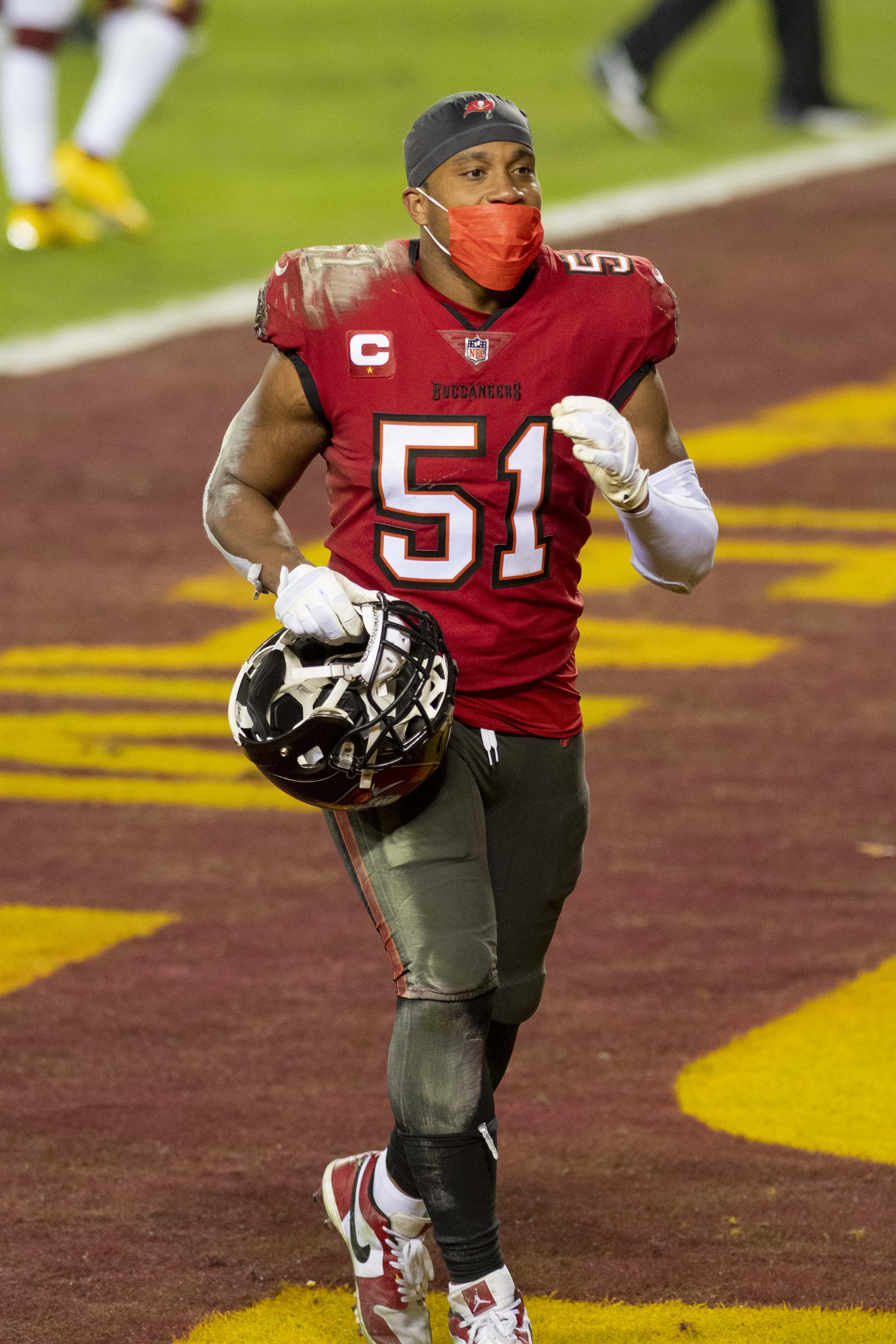
- Minter with the Tampa Bay Buccaneers in 2021

No. 51, 41
- Position: Linebacker

Personal information
- Born: December 3, 1990 (age 35); Suwanee, Georgia, U.S.
- Listed height: 6 ft 0 in (1.83 m)
- Listed weight: 246 lb (112 kg)

Career information
- High school: Peachtree Ridge (Suwanee)
- College: LSU (2009–2012)
- NFL draft: 2013: 2nd round, 45th overall pick

Career history
- Arizona Cardinals (2013–2016); Cincinnati Bengals (2017); New York Jets (2018)*; Tampa Bay Buccaneers (2018–2021)
- * Offseason or practice squad member only

Awards and highlights
- Super Bowl champion (LV); First-team All-SEC (2012)

Career NFL statistics
- Total tackles: 354
- Sacks: 7
- Forced fumbles: 1
- Fumble recoveries: 1
- Stats at Pro Football Reference

Kevin Christopher Minter (born December 3, 1990) is an American former professional football player who was a linebacker in the National Football League (NFL). He played college football for the LSU Tigers, earning first-team all-Southeastern Conference honors and was selected by the Arizona Cardinals in the second round of the 2013 NFL draft.

== Early life ==
Minter was born in Suwanee, Georgia, the son of Leonard Minter and Willie Mae Hollis. Minter attended Berkmar High School in Lilburn, Georgia for his freshman and sophomore years before transferring to Peachtree Ridge High School in Suwanee for his junior and senior seasons. He was a starter for all four years of his high school career. In his junior year, he had 137 tackles. In his senior year, he had 113 tackles and was named to the Class 5A all-state first-team.

== College career ==
Minter enrolled in Louisiana State University, and played for coach Les Miles's LSU Tigers football team from 2009 to 2012. He redshirted the 2009 season. The following year, he had 15 tackles. In 2011, he had 61 tackles and one sack. He had five tackles and a sack in the BCS Championship Game.

In 2012, Minter had 130 tackles, which led the team and was the third-best total in the SEC. He also had 4.0 sacks. He had a career-best 20 tackles and two sacks against Florida, and his 17 solo tackles versus Florida was an LSU single-game record. In the Chick-fil-A Bowl, he set an LSU bowl game record with 19 tackles. Minter was a Butkus Award finalist, a first-team All-SEC selection, and the LSU team MVP. Sports Illustrated named him to their All-American first-team. He left LSU after the season to enter the 2013 NFL draft. He ended his collegiate career with 206 tackles and 5.0 sacks.

In 2012, he graduated from LSU with a bachelor's degree in general studies.

== Professional career ==
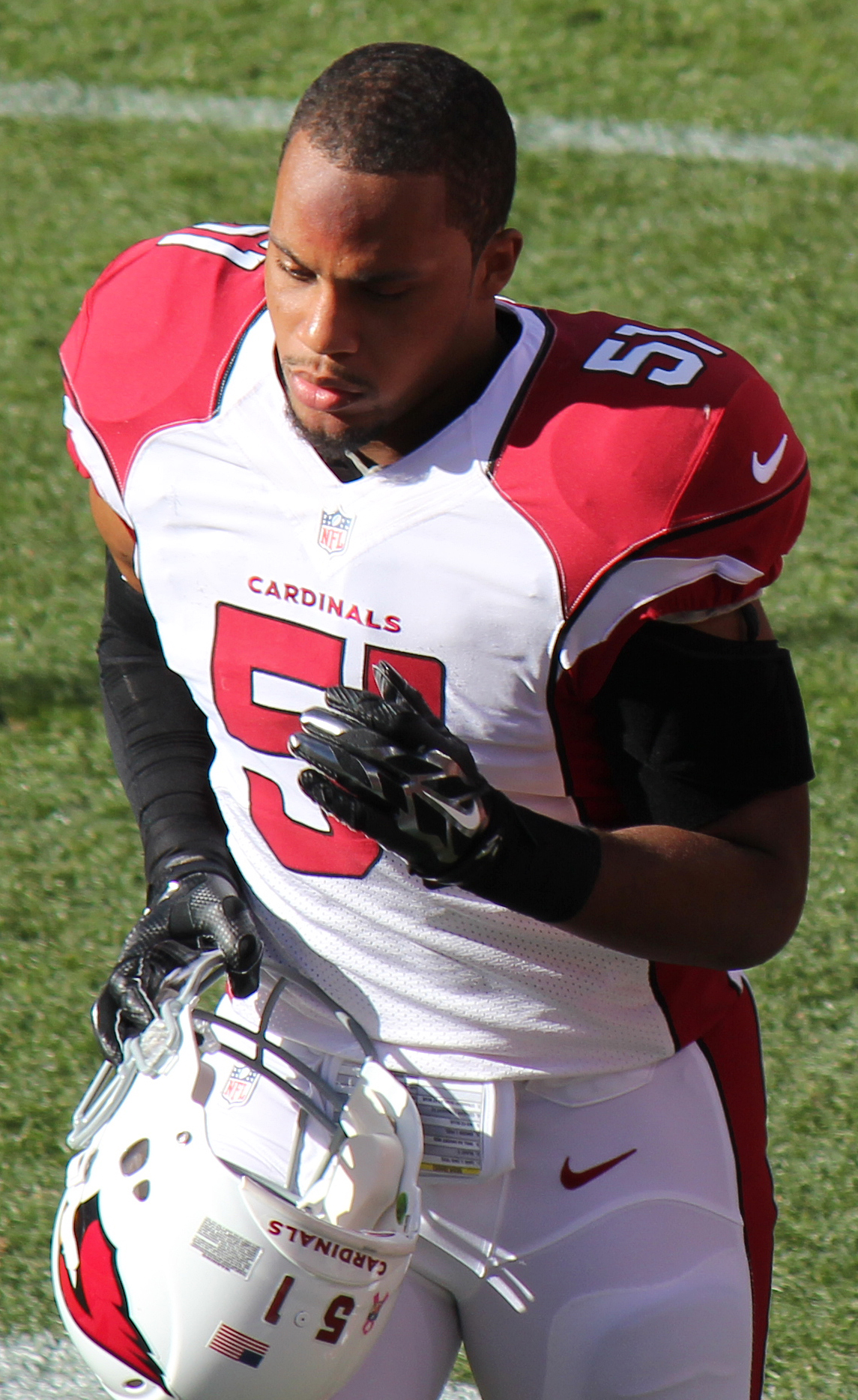
Minter with the Arizona Cardinals in 2014

Pre-draft measurables
Height	Weight	Arm length	Hand span	40-yard dash	Vertical jump	Broad jump	Bench press
5 ft 11 3/4 in (1.82 m)	246 lb (112 kg)	32 in (0.81 m)	9 3/8 in (0.24 m)	4.81 s	33 in (0.84 m)	9 ft 11 in (3.02 m)	25 reps
All values from NFL Combine

=== Arizona Cardinals ===
Minter was selected by the Arizona Cardinals in the second round, with the 45th overall pick, of the 2013 NFL draft. In his rookie season, Minter contributed as a special teams player as he only played two defensive snaps while making four tackles.

The following year, Minter appeared in all 16 games, starting four and totaling 44 tackles. The next two seasons, he started in all 32 games at linebacker, recording a combined 175 tackles and four sacks.

=== Cincinnati Bengals ===
On March 18, 2017, Minter signed a one-year contract with the Cincinnati Bengals. He played in nine games, starting seven, before suffering a hamstring injury in Week 14. He was placed on injured reserve on December 15.

=== New York Jets ===
On April 9, 2018, Minter signed with the New York Jets. He was released by the Jets as a part of final roster cuts on August 31.

=== Tampa Bay Buccaneers ===
On October 23, 2018, Minter signed with the Tampa Bay Buccaneers, but was released eight days later. He was re-signed on November 13. Minter was placed on injured reserve on December 11.

On March 13, 2019, Minter re-signed with the Buccaneers.

On March 25, 2020, Minter re-signed with the Buccaneers. He was placed on the reserve/COVID-19 list by the team on January 11, 2021, and activated on January 20.

On March 20, 2021, Minter re-signed with the Buccaneers.

== NFL career statistics ==
Legend
**Bold**	Career high

=== Regular season ===
Year	Team	Games		Tackles					Interceptions					Fumbles			
Year	Team	GP	GS	Cmb	Solo	Ast	Sck	TFL	Int	Yds	TD	Lng	PD	FF	FR	Yds	TD
2013	ARI	13	0	4	4	0	0.0	0	0	0	0	0	0	0	0	0	0
2014	ARI	**16**	5	44	39	5	1.0	5	0	0	0	0	0	0	0	0	0
2015	ARI	**16**	**16**	**94**	**72**	**22**	0.5	8	0	0	0	0	**2**	**1**	0	0	0
2016	ARI	**16**	**16**	81	59	**22**	**3.5**	**9**	0	0	0	0	**2**	0	0	0	0
2017	CIN	9	7	32	16	16	0.0	0	0	0	0	0	0	0	0	0	0
2018	TAM	5	0	10	8	2	1.0	1	0	0	0	0	0	0	0	0	0
2019	TAM	**16**	2	34	21	13	0.0	2	0	0	0	0	**2**	0	**1**	0	0
2020	TAM	**16**	1	15	10	5	0.0	0	0	0	0	0	1	0	0	0	0
2021	TAM	**16**	5	40	26	14	1.0	2	0	0	0	0	0	0	0	0	0
		123	52	354	255	99	7.0	27	0	0	0	0	7	1	1	0	0

=== Playoffs ===
Year	Team	Games		Tackles					Interceptions					Fumbles			
Year	Team	GP	GS	Cmb	Solo	Ast	Sck	TFL	Int	Yds	TD	Lng	PD	FF	FR	Yds	TD
2014	ARI	1	0	2	2	0	0.0	0	0	0	0	0	0	0	0	0	0
2015	ARI	2	**2**	**12**	**6**	**6**	0.0	**2**	0	0	0	0	0	0	0	0	0
2020	TAM	**3**	1	6	3	3	0.0	0	0	0	0	0	**1**	0	0	0	0
2021	TAM	2	0	2	1	1	0.0	0	0	0	0	0	0	0	0	0	0
		8	3	22	12	10	0.0	2	0	0	0	0	1	0	0	0	0

== Personal life ==
He has been married since 2019 to Sydne Rie Minter, a Real Estate Agent in Atlanta. They have a son, Kevin Minter Jr and daughter, Santana Minter.
