= Rodney Gunter =

American football player (born 1992)

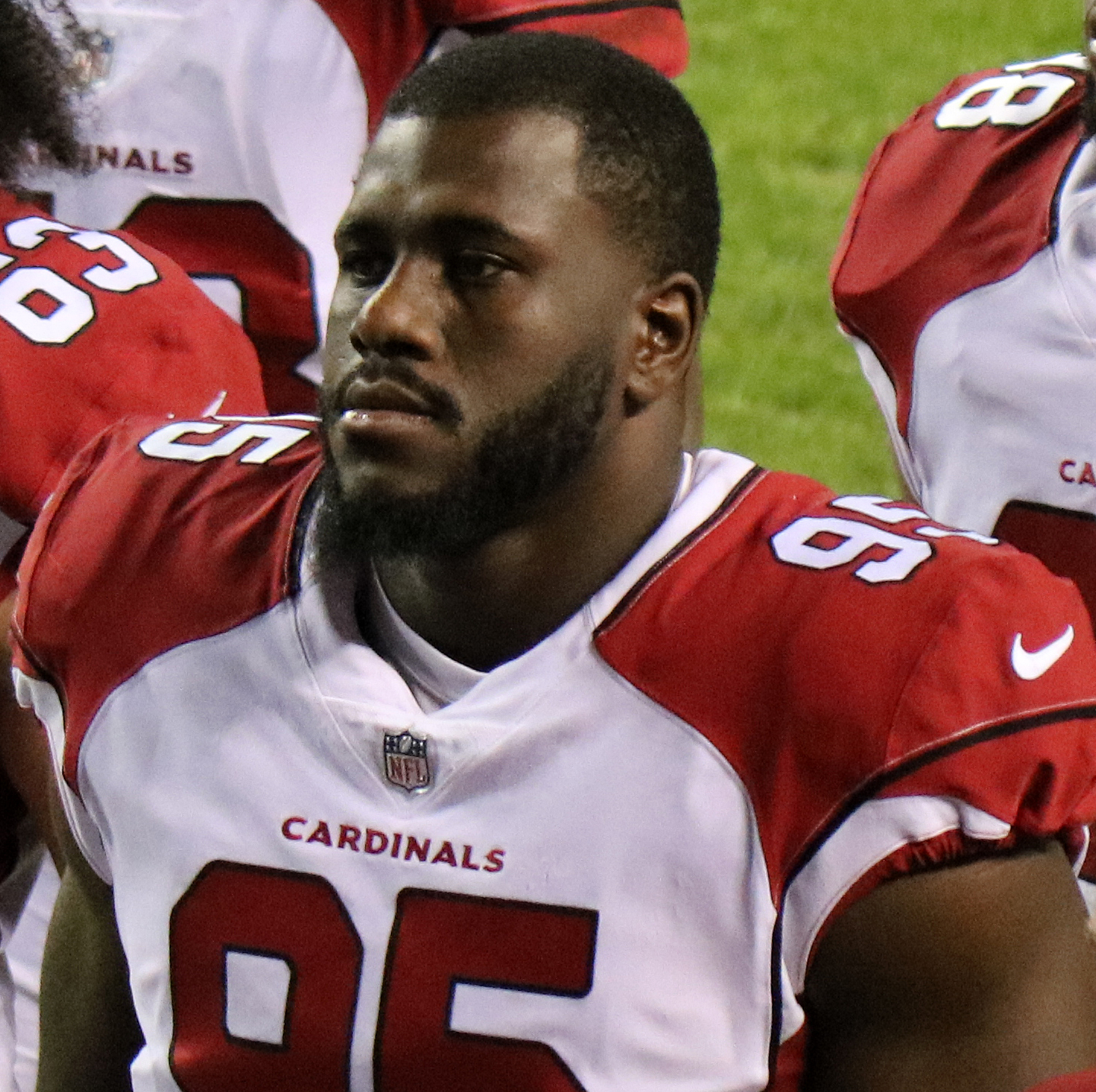
- Gunter with the Arizona Cardinals in 2017

No. 95
- Position: Defensive tackle

Personal information
- Born: January 19, 1992 (age 34); Lake Hamilton, Florida, U.S.
- Listed height: 6 ft 5 in (1.96 m)
- Listed weight: 305 lb (138 kg)

Career information
- High school: Haines City (FL)
- College: Delaware State
- NFL draft: 2015: 4th round, 116th overall pick

Career history
- Arizona Cardinals (2015–2019); Jacksonville Jaguars (2020)*
- * Offseason or practice squad member only

Career NFL statistics
- Total tackles: 126
- Sacks: 11
- Forced fumbles: 2
- Fumble recoveries: 1
- Stats at Pro Football Reference

Rodney Gunter (born January 19, 1992) is an American former professional football player who was a defensive end for five seasons in the National Football League (NFL). He played college football for the Delaware State Hornets. He was selected by the Arizona Cardinals in the fourth round of the 2015 NFL draft.

== Professional career ==
=== Arizona Cardinals ===
Gunter was drafted by the Arizona Cardinals in the fourth round, 116th overall, in the 2015 NFL draft. In his rookie year in 2015, he played 16 games making 20 tackles with 1 sack.

In 2018, Gunter recorded career-highs with 44 tackles, 4.5 sacks, and two forced fumbles through 16 games and 10 starts.

On April 8, 2019, Gunter re-signed with the Cardinals on a one-year $1.75 million deal. He played in 13 games before being placed on injured reserve on December 10, 2019, with a toe injury.

=== Jacksonville Jaguars ===
On March 24, 2020, Gunter signed a three-year contract with the Jacksonville Jaguars. He was placed on the active/non-football illness list at the start of training camp on August 8, 2020.

On August 16, 2020, Gunter retired from football, citing a heart condition.

== NFL career statistics ==
Legend
**Bold**	Career high

=== Regular season ===
Year	Team	Games		Tackles					Interceptions					Fumbles			
Year	Team	GP	GS	Cmb	Solo	Ast	Sck	TFL	Int	Yds	TD	Lng	PD	FF	FR	Yds	TD
2015	ARI	**16**	11	19	16	3	1.0	3	0	0	0	0	0	0	0	0	0
2016	ARI	**16**	1	15	7	8	1.5	1	0	0	0	0	0	0	**1**	0	0
2017	ARI	**16**	3	17	11	6	1.0	2	0	0	0	0	0	0	0	0	0
2018	ARI	**16**	10	**44**	**32**	**12**	**4.5**	**11**	0	0	0	0	**1**	**2**	0	0	0
2019	ARI	13	**13**	31	20	11	3.0	9	0	0	0	0	0	0	0	0	0
		77	38	126	86	40	11.0	26	0	0	0	0	1	2	1	0	0

=== Playoffs ===
Year	Team	Games		Tackles					Interceptions					Fumbles			
Year	Team	GP	GS	Cmb	Solo	Ast	Sck	TFL	Int	Yds	TD	Lng	PD	FF	FR	Yds	TD
2015	ARI	**2**	0	**3**	**1**	**2**	0.0	0	0	0	0	0	0	0	0	0	0
		2	0	3	1	2	0.0	0	0	0	0	0	0	0	0	0	0
