= Drew Butler =

American football player (born 1989)

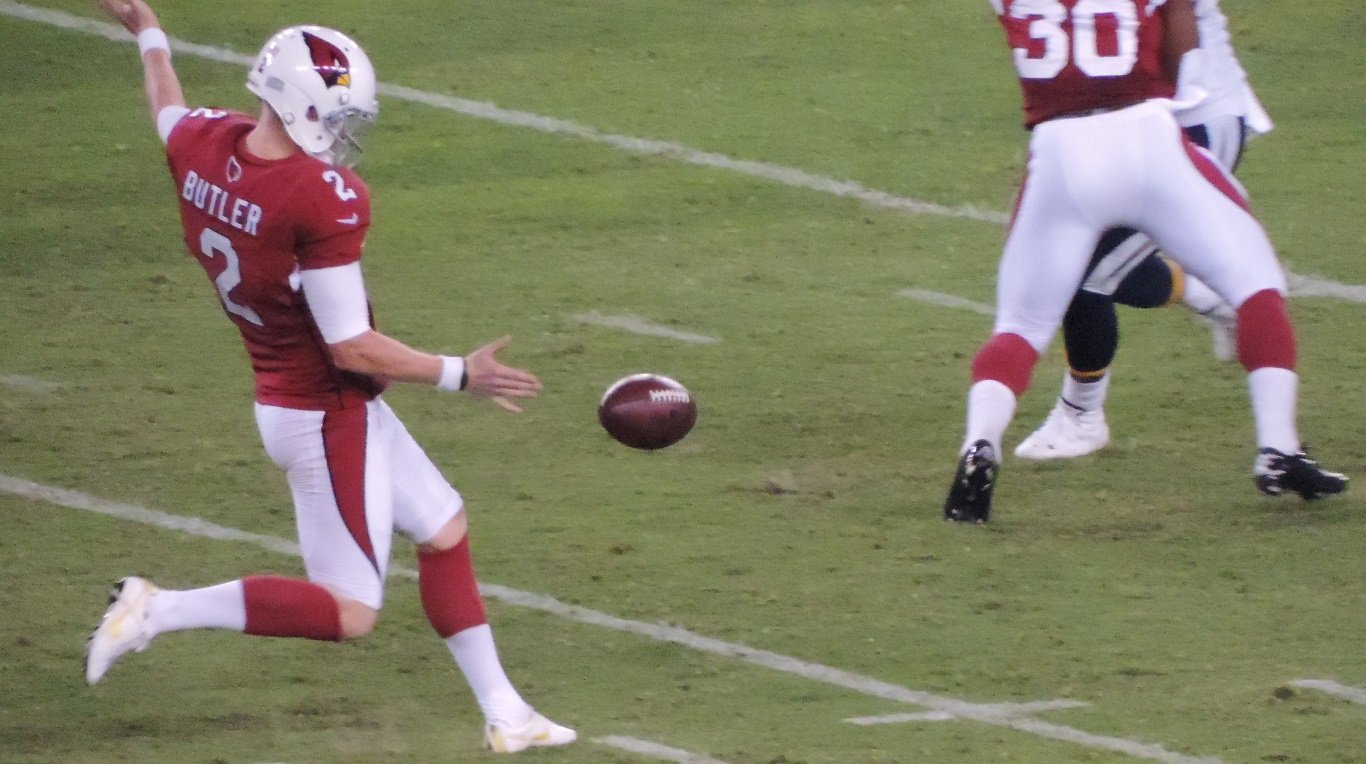
- Butler with the Arizona Cardinals in 2014

No. 9, 2
- Position: Punter

Personal information
- Born: May 10, 1989 (age 37); Lake Forest, Illinois, U.S.
- Listed height: 6 ft 1 in (1.85 m)
- Listed weight: 199 lb (90 kg)

Career information
- High school: Peachtree Ridge (Suwanee, Georgia)
- College: Georgia (2007–2011)
- NFL draft: 2012: undrafted

Career history
- Pittsburgh Steelers (2012); Chicago Bears (2014)*; Detroit Lions (2014)*; Arizona Cardinals (2014–2016)
- * Offseason or practice squad member only

Awards and highlights
- Ray Guy Award (2009); Unanimous All-American (2009); Second-team All-American (2010); First-team All-SEC (2009); Second-team All-SEC (2010)

Career NFL statistics
- Punts: 248
- Punting yards: 10,627
- Punting average: 42.9
- Longest punt: 79
- Inside 20: 92
- Stats at Pro Football Reference

Andrew Joseph Butler (born May 10, 1989) is an American former professional football player who was a punter in the National Football League (NFL). He played college football for the Georgia Bulldogs, winning the Ray Guy Award and earning unanimous All-American honors in 2009. He was signed by the Pittsburgh Steelers as an undrafted free agent after the 2012 NFL draft.

== Early life ==
Butler was born in Lake Forest, Illinois, and is the son of Kevin Butler, a former University of Georgia and NFL placekicker who began his career with the 1985 Chicago Bears. He attended Peachtree Ridge High School in Suwanee, Georgia, and played high school football for the Peachtree Ridge Lions. As a junior, he averaged 40 yards per punt with a longest kick of 63 yards and 13 punts inside the 20-yard line. Following his senior season in 2006, The Atlanta Journal-Constitution and the Georgia Sports Writers Association named him to their Class 5A all-state first-teams. Scout.com rated him as the No. 9 punter recruit in the nation. He also played Peachtree Ridge Lions golf team, while maintaining a 3.9 grade point average.

== College career ==
Butler attended the University of Georgia, where he played for coach Mark Richt's Georgia Bulldogs football team from 2007 to 2011. He led the nation in punting average for the 2009 NCAA Division I FBS football season. He was selected as the first-team All-Southeastern Conference (SEC) punter, and a unanimous All-American, and he was the winner of the Ray Guy Award recognizing him as the best college punter in the nation.

In 2010, Butler was selected as the second-team All-SEC punter by the coaches. He was a first-team All-American selection by Pro Football Weekly, a second-team choice by the Associated Press and CBS Sports, as well as an honorable mention selection by Sports Illustrated. Butler was once again a finalist for the Ray Guy Award in 2010. He was a 2010 first-team Academic All-America selection.

On December 6, 2011, he was honored as a National Football Foundation (NFF) Scholar-Athlete Award recipient, named a finalist for the William V. Campbell Trophy. He was also honored on that same day when he earned honorable mention All-SEC recognition by the Associated Press. On December 8, he repeated in 2011 as a first-team Academic All-America selection.

== Professional career ==
=== Pittsburgh Steelers ===
On April 28, 2012, following the 2012 NFL draft, Butler was one of 12 undrafted free agent rookies signed by the Pittsburgh Steelers. During the 2012 season, Butler punted 77 times, and averaged 43.8 yards. For the 2013 NFL season he beat Brian Moorman in preseason to make the 53-man roster.

=== Chicago Bears ===
On December 31, 2013, Butler was signed to a future/reserve contract by the Chicago Bears. On May 18, Butler was released.

=== Detroit Lions ===
On July 25, 2014, Butler was signed by the Detroit Lions. The Lions released Butler on August 25, 2014.

=== Arizona Cardinals ===
The Cardinals signed Butler on September 8, 2014. Butler made his debut for the Cardinals later that same day in their 2014 season opener against the San Diego Chargers on ESPN's Monday Night Football. He was released on September 16, 2014. He was re-signed by the Cardinals on September 19, 2014. On October 6, 2014, he became the starting punter after Dave Zastudil was placed on season-ending injured reserve. Butler went on to lead the NFL in punts inside the 20 during the 2014 season.

On October 4, 2016, Butler was released by the Cardinals. He was re-signed on November 15, 2016, and released again on December 13, 2016.

=== Career statistics ===
==== Regular season ====
Season	Team	Punting										
Season	Team	GP	Punts	Yds	Lng	Avg	Net Avg	Blk	In 20	TB	Ret	RetY
2012	Pittsburgh Steelers	16	77	3,374	79	43.8	37.8	1	26	6	30	306
2014	Arizona Cardinals	15	79	3,328	67	42.1	36.8	2	34	5	26	246
2015	Arizona Cardinals	16	60	2,575	58	42.9	35.4	1	22	6	25	295
2016	Arizona Cardinals	7	32	1,350	62	42.2	39.0	0	18	3	14	100
	Total	47	216	9,277	79	42.9	38.2	4	82	17	81	847

==== Postseason ====
Season	Team	Punting										
Season	Team	GP	Punts	Yds	Lng	Avg	Net Avg	Blk	In 20	TB	Ret	RetY
2015	Arizona Cardinals	2	7	342	55	48.9	43.4	0	3	0	3	38
	Total	2	7	342	55	48.9	43.4	0	3	0	3	38

== Post-playing career ==
Butler runs 4th Down Consulting and hosts a pair of college football podcasts titled Punt & Pass Podcast and CampusLore Life. In March 2021, he was hired by Icon Source, a company helping college athletes receive student athlete compensation, as Executive Vice President.
