= Xavier Williams =

American football player (born 1992)

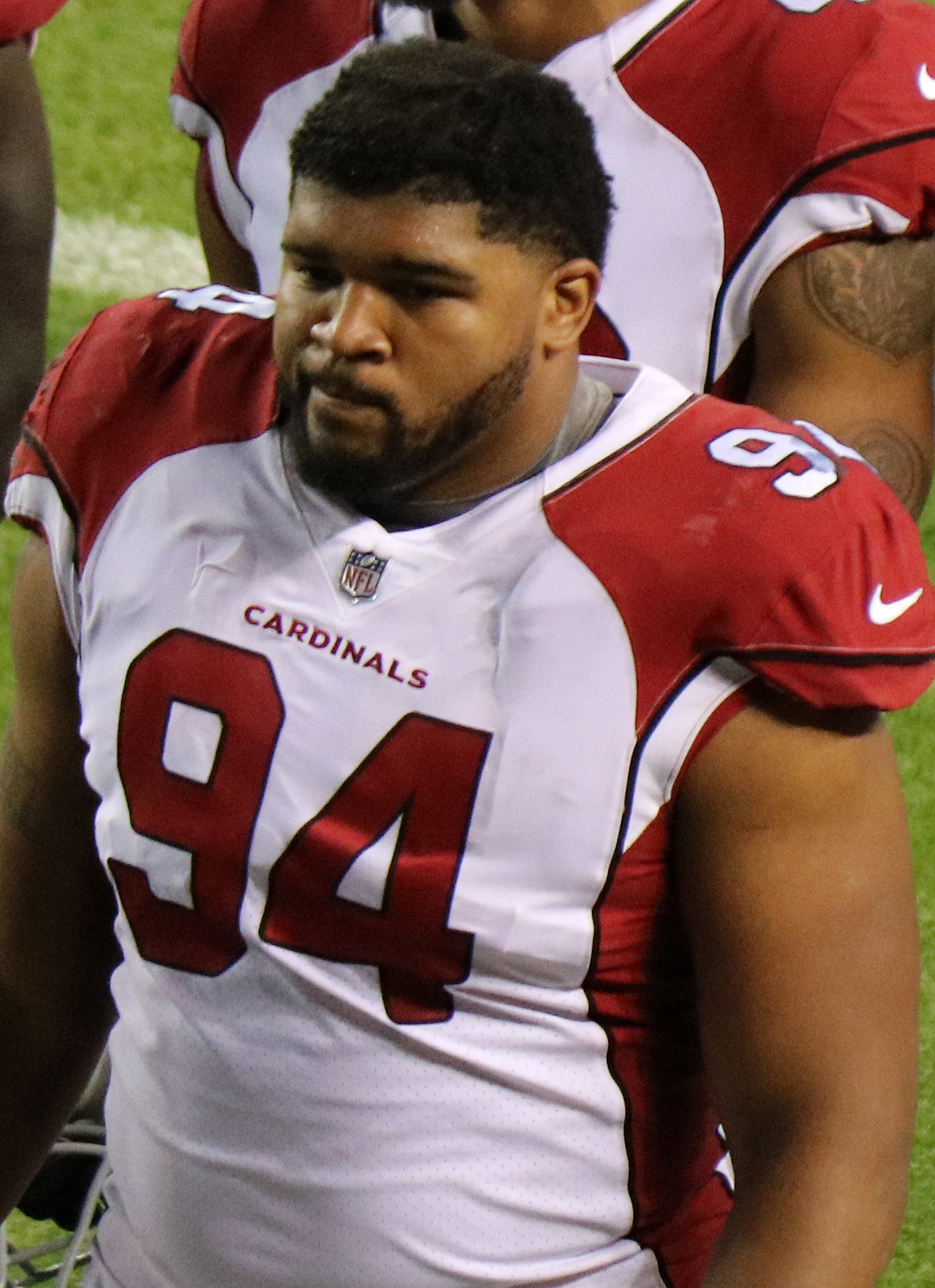
- Williams with the Arizona Cardinals in 2017

No. 94, 98, 71, 69
- Position: Nose tackle

Personal information
- Born: January 18, 1992 (age 34); Kansas City, Missouri, U.S.
- Listed height: 6 ft 2 in (1.88 m)
- Listed weight: 309 lb (140 kg)

Career information
- High school: Grandview (Grandview, Missouri)
- College: Northern Iowa
- NFL draft: 2015: undrafted

Career history
- Arizona Cardinals (2015–2017); Kansas City Chiefs (2018–2019); New England Patriots (2020); Cincinnati Bengals (2020); Arizona Cardinals (2021)*; Houston Texans (2021)
- * Offseason or practice squad member only

Awards and highlights
- Super Bowl champion (LIV); 2× All-Missouri Valley Conference (2013, 2014)

Career NFL statistics
- Total tackles: 107
- Sacks: 4.0
- Forced fumbles: 3
- Fumble recoveries: 1
- Stats at Pro Football Reference

Xavier Williams (born January 18, 1992) is an American former professional football player who was a nose tackle in the National Football League (NFL). He played college football for the Northern Iowa Panthers. He was signed as an undrafted free agent by the Arizona Cardinals.

== Early life ==
Williams attended Grandview High School, where he was named a first-team all conference selection. He was named to the Suburban Mid-Six team in 2009 and earned first-team all metro honors. Aside from football, Williams was a three-year starter and two-time qualifier in wrestling.

== College career ==
Williams attended the University of Northern Iowa between 2010 and 2014. He was earned All-Missouri Valley Football Conference First-team Honors in both 2013 and 2014. Williams had the opportunity to play in the East-West Shrine Game following his senior season, where he performed well at the defensive tackle position

== Professional career ==
Pre-draft measurables
Height	Weight	Arm length	Hand span	Wingspan	40-yard dash	10-yard split	20-yard split	20-yard shuttle	Three-cone drill	Vertical jump	Broad jump	Bench press
6 ft 1 3/4 in (1.87 m)	320 lb (145 kg)	32 7/8 in (0.84 m)	10 1/2 in (0.27 m)	6 ft 8 7/8 in (2.05 m)	5.32 s	1.83 s	2.94 s	5.01 s	8.03 s	25.5 in (0.65 m)	8 ft 7 in (2.62 m)	30 reps
All values from Pro Day

=== Arizona Cardinals (first stint) ===
On May 5, 2015, Williams signed with the Arizona Cardinals as an undrafted free agent. In his rookie year in 2015, he played 4 games making 2 tackles.

On March 13, 2018, the Cardinals placed an original round restricted free agent tender on Williams, which allows a player to negotiate a contract with another team, but their original team can match the offer, if they refuse, they receive a draft pick from the round the player was selected in. For undrafted players, like Williams, the team receives no compensation.

=== Kansas City Chiefs ===
On March 20, 2018, Williams received a contract offer from the Kansas City Chiefs giving the Cardinals a chance to match. The Cardinals declined to match the Chiefs offer, so he signed his offer sheet with the Chiefs.

On October 9, 2019, Williams was placed on injured reserve with a high ankle sprain. He was designated for return from injured reserve on December 4, 2019, and began practicing with the team again. He was activated on December 25, 2019. Williams won Super Bowl LIV with the Chiefs after defeating the San Francisco 49ers 31–20.

After becoming a free agent in March 2020, Williams visited the Tampa Bay Buccaneers on August 8, 2020, and had a tryout with the New England Patriots on August 20, 2020.

=== New England Patriots ===
On August 22, 2020, Williams signed with the Patriots. On September 5, 2020, he was waived by the team and added to the practice squad the following day. He was elevated to the active roster on September 12 for the team's week 1 game against the Miami Dolphins, and reverted to the practice squad after the game on September 14. He was released on October 2, 2020.

=== Cincinnati Bengals ===
On October 12, 2020, Williams was signed by the Cincinnati Bengals. Williams made his debut with the Bengals in Week 6 against the Indianapolis Colts. During the game, Williams recovered a fumble lost by tight end Jack Doyle and later recorded his first sack of the season on Philip Rivers during the 31–27 loss.

=== Arizona Cardinals (second stint) ===
On June 7, 2021, Williams signed with the Cardinals. He was placed on injured reserve on August 8, 2021. He was released on August 16.

=== Houston Texans ===
On December 21, 2021, Williams was signed to the Houston Texans active roster. He was released on December 31.
