= Shaquille Riddick =

American football player (born 1993)

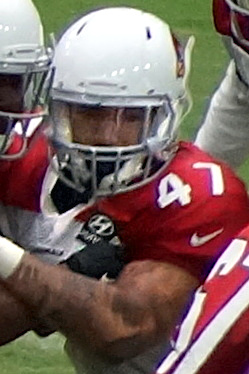
- Riddick with the Arizona Cardinals in 2016

No. 47, 76
- Position: Outside linebacker

Personal information
- Born: March 12, 1993 (age 33); Akron, Ohio
- Listed height: 6 ft 6 in (1.98 m)
- Listed weight: 260 lb (118 kg)

Career information
- High school: Akron (OH) Buchtel
- College: West Virginia
- NFL draft: 2015: 5th round, 158th overall pick

Career history
- Arizona Cardinals (2015–2016); Pittsburgh Steelers (2016)*; Edmonton Eskimos (2018)
- * Offseason or practice squad member only

Awards and highlights
- Big 12 Defensive Newcomer of the Year (2014)
- Stats at Pro Football Reference

Shaquille Riddick (born March 12, 1993) is an American former football outside linebacker. He first played college football at Gardner–Webb University, before transferring to West Virginia.

== Professional career ==
=== Arizona Cardinals ===
Riddick was drafted by the Arizona Cardinals in the fifth round, 158th overall, in the 2015 NFL draft. On September 3, 2016, he was released by the Cardinals. The next day, he was signed to the Cardinals' practice squad. He was released on September 27, 2016.

=== Pittsburgh Steelers ===
On December 13, 2016, Riddick was signed to the Pittsburgh Steelers' practice squad.

=== Edmonton Eskimos ===
Riddick signed with the Edmonton Eskimos of the Canadian Football League on November 9, 2018. He was released on June 8, 2019.
