= Jonathan Cooper =

American football player (born 1990)

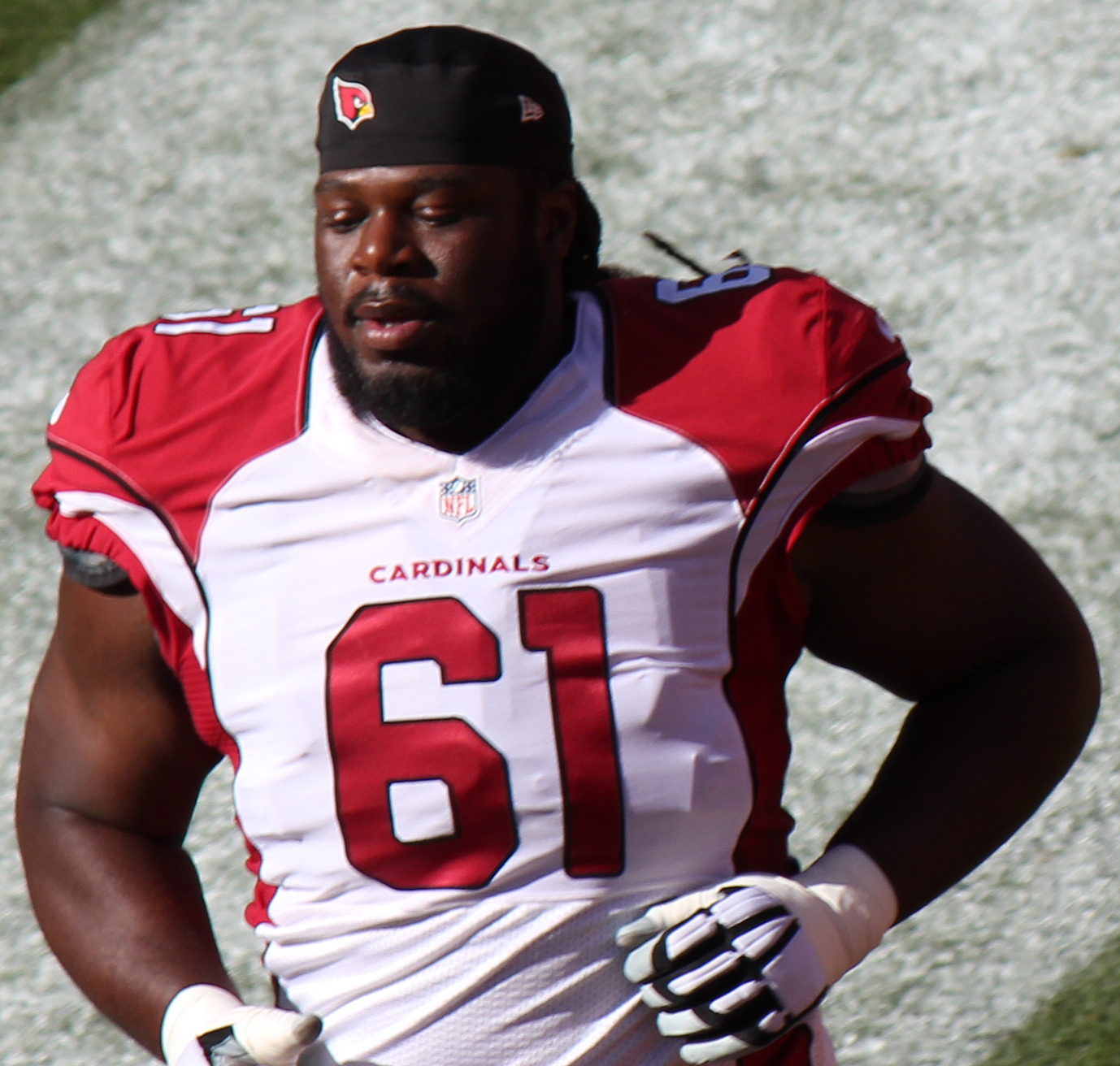
- Cooper with the Arizona Cardinals in 2014

No. 61, 64, 72
- Position: Guard

Personal information
- Born: January 19, 1990 (age 36); Wilmington, North Carolina, U.S.
- Listed height: 6 ft 2 in (1.88 m)
- Listed weight: 308 lb (140 kg)

Career information
- High school: John T. Hoggard (Wilmington)
- College: North Carolina (2008–2012)
- NFL draft: 2013: 1st round, 7th overall pick

Career history
- Arizona Cardinals (2013–2015); New England Patriots (2016); Cleveland Browns (2016); Dallas Cowboys (2016–2017); San Francisco 49ers (2018)*; Washington Redskins (2018); Oakland Raiders (2019)
- * Offseason or practice squad member only

Awards and highlights
- Unanimous All-American (2012); ACC Jacobs Blocking Trophy (2012); First-team All-ACC (2012); 2× Second-team All-ACC (2010, 2011); North Carolina Tar Heels Jersey No. 64 honored

Career NFL statistics
- Games played: 46
- Games started: 31
- Stats at Pro Football Reference

Jonathan Javell Cooper (born January 19, 1990) is an American former professional football player who was a guard in the National Football League (NFL). He was selected by the Arizona Cardinals seventh overall in the 2013 NFL draft. He played college football for the North Carolina Tar Heels, where he earned All-American honors. He also spent time with the New England Patriots, Cleveland Browns, Dallas Cowboys, San Francisco 49ers, Washington Redskins, and Oakland Raiders.

== Early life ==
Cooper was born on January 19, 1990. A native of Wilmington, North Carolina, he attended John T. Hoggard High School in Wilmington, where he was a three-sport athlete in football, wrestling, and track. He played football as a guard, but also saw time at defensive end.

In his senior year, he paved the way for three players who rushed for 600 yards or more, helping Hoggard win the NCHSAA 4A football state championship with a 16–0 record. Cooper was voted the conference's player of the year as an offensive lineman. In addition to football, he was a standout heavyweight wrestler. He placed twice at the NCHSAA 4A state tournament in the 285-pound weight class. Cooper also competed in the shot put on the track & field team, recording a top-throw of 14.58 meters (47 ft 2 in).

Regarded as a three-star recruit by Rivals.com, Cooper was listed as the No. 21 offensive guard prospect in his class.

== College career ==
Cooper accepted a football scholarship from the University of North Carolina at Chapel Hill. As a redshirt freshman, he started 10 games at left guard and saw action on 579 snaps. He sat out the Connecticut, Georgia Tech and Virginia games due to an ankle injury. Still, Cooper recorded a team-best 40 knock-down blocks on the season and owned a 73-percent grade. He was named to the All-ACC freshman team by The Sporting News.

As a sophomore, Cooper started all 13 games in the regular season and played a team-high 875 snaps. For the second straight year, he led the Tar Heels in knock-down blocks with 55 on the year. Cooper graded out at 83 percent for the season, tied with James Hurst for the best mark on the team. Against William & Mary, he played all 71 snaps and graded out at a season-best 92 percent with seven knock-downs. Cooper earned second-team All-ACC honors at offensive guard.

As a junior, Cooper started all 13 games at left guard. He saw action on 864 plays and graded out at 86 percent for the season, good for second on the team. He earned second-team All-ACC honors, and along with left tackle James Hurst, was part of the first Carolina offensive line tandem to earn All-ACC honors since 1993.

As a senior, he started all 12 games and paved the way for the ACC's leading rusher Giovani Bernard. He was a unanimous All-American selection and received the Jacobs Blocking Trophy as the best offensive lineman in the ACC. He finished his college career with a school record 48 starts.

== Professional career ==
=== Pre-draft ===
Cooper was widely considered one of the top guard prospects in the 2013 NFL draft, along with Chance Warmack. After the NFL Combine, Sports Illustrated projected him as the No. 10 overall selection. North Carolina had not seen one of their offensive lineman taken in the first round since tackle Harris Barton was selected in the first round with the 22nd overall pick by the San Francisco 49ers in 1987.

Pre-draft measurables
Height	Weight	Arm length	Hand span	40-yard dash	10-yard split	20-yard split	20-yard shuttle	Three-cone drill	Vertical jump	Broad jump	Bench press
6 ft 2 1/8 in (1.88 m)	311 lb (141 kg)	33 in (0.84 m)	10 1/4 in (0.26 m)	5.07 s	1.83 s	2.91 s	4.84 s	7.78 s	27 in (0.69 m)	9 ft 0 in (2.74 m)	35 reps
All values from NFL Combine

=== Arizona Cardinals ===
Cooper was selected in the first round with the seventh overall pick by the Arizona Cardinals in the 2013 NFL draft. He was the highest selected offensive guard since Jim Dombrowski in the 1986 NFL draft. On July 28, 2013, Cooper was signed to a four-year, $14.55 million contract. He was given the starting left guard position in OTAs. On August 24, in the third preseason game against the San Diego Chargers, Cooper broke his left fibula. On August 30, the Cardinals placed him on the injured reserve list. It has been speculated that he was never the same player following this injury.

In 2014, he was named the starter at left guard even though he was slow to recover from his previous injury and battled through a turf toe and knee injury in training camp. The injuries forced the Cardinals to name Ted Larsen as the starter at left guard to begin the season. In week 14 against the Kansas City Chiefs, an ankle injury to left guard Paul Fanaika opened the door for Cooper to have his first career start. He injured his left wrist in the next contest against the St. Louis Rams. He was declared inactive in the last 2 regular season games and the playoffs.

In 2015, he was moved to the right guard starting position after the team signed All-Pro Mike Iupati, but he suffered a knee injury against the Seattle Seahawks in Week 10. He was declared inactive in 2 games because of the injury and returned as a backup behind Larsen for the rest of the season. The Cardinals were planning to move Cooper to center during the 2016 offseason.

=== New England Patriots ===
On March 15, 2016, Cooper and a second-round draft pick (#61-Vonn Bell) were traded to the New England Patriots in exchange for defensive end Chandler Jones. Cooper was working as a starter at right guard into the third day of training camp, when he suffered a right foot injury that sidelined him, causing him to be passed on the depth chart at guard by Shaq Mason and rookie Ted Karras. He was declared inactive for the first four games of the season until being released on October 8.

=== Cleveland Browns ===
On October 10, 2016, Cooper was claimed off waivers by the Cleveland Browns. He was declared inactive in 5 games, until being named the starter at right guard against the Cincinnati Bengals in week 14. He started three of the five games he played.

On December 27, Cooper was waived to make room for guard Alvin Bailey, who was being activated from a two-game suspension.

=== Dallas Cowboys ===
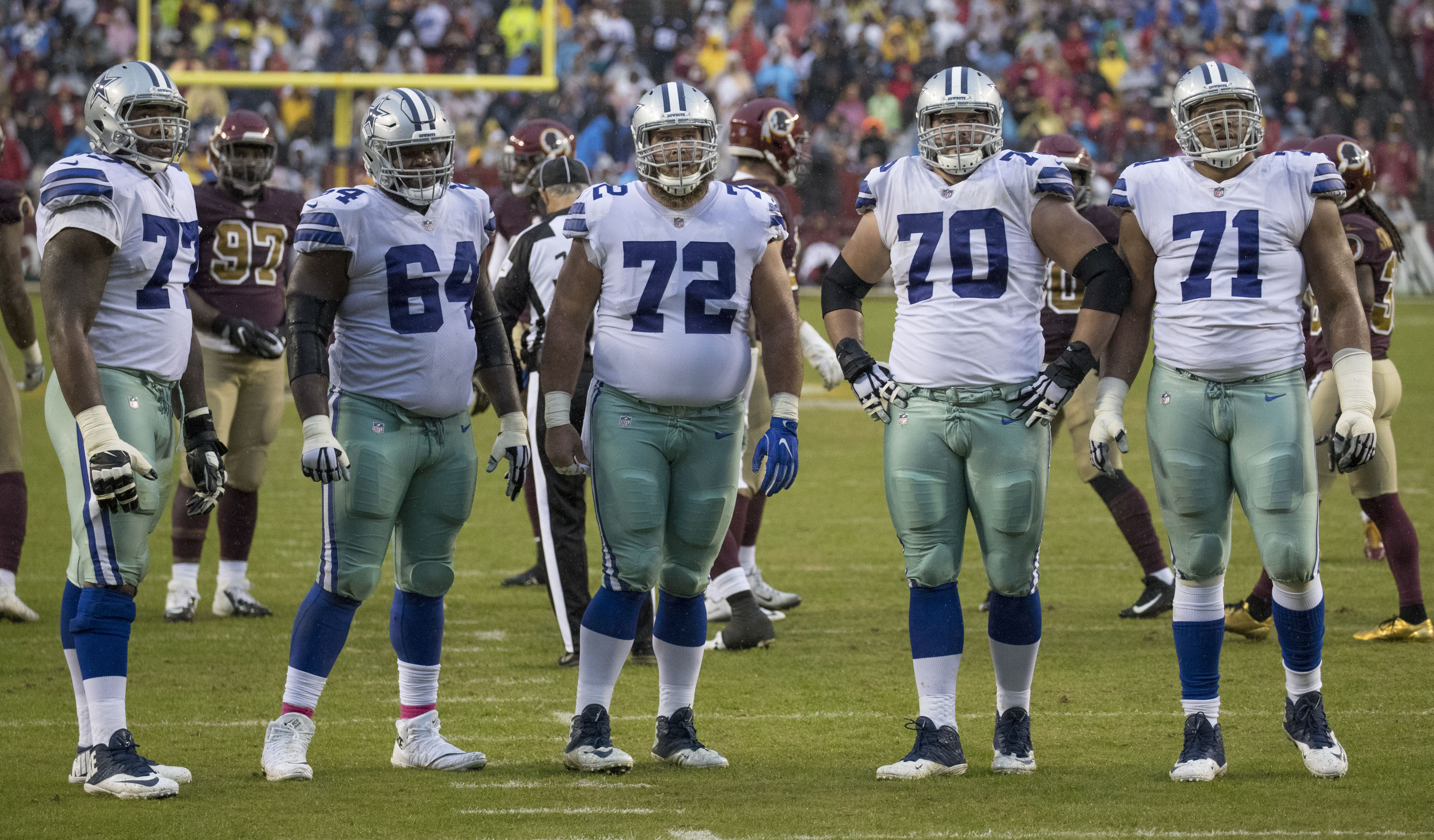
Dallas Cowboys Offensive Line vs Redskins 2017

On January 4, 2017, Cooper was signed by the Dallas Cowboys to provide depth on the offensive line for the playoffs and to evaluate his performance closely, as the Cowboys had been interested in Cooper since the 2013 NFL draft.

On March 14, 2017, Cooper signed a one-year contract with the Dallas Cowboys to compete for the vacant left guard job after Ronald Leary departed in free agency, with La'el Collins additionally moving to right tackle. He also was tried at center during Organized Team Activities. He was declared inactive for the first three games. He was named the starter at left guard in the fourth game against the Los Angeles Rams in place of an injured Chaz Green, helping to stabilize the offensive line the rest of the season. He started a career-high 13 games, but suffered a sprained left medial collateral ligament in the season finale against the Philadelphia Eagles.

=== San Francisco 49ers ===
On March 20, 2018, Cooper signed with the San Francisco 49ers on a one-year deal. In training camp, he was limited with his surgically repaired left knee, while competing for the right offensive guard starting position. He was passed on the depth chart by Mike Person and Joshua Garnett. He was released on September 1.

=== Washington Redskins ===
On November 5, 2018, he was signed by the Washington Redskins, following season ending injuries to starting offensive linemen Brandon Scherff and Shawn Lauvao. He made his first start as a Redskin on November 11, 2018, playing left guard against the Tampa Bay Buccaneers. In a game against the Philadelphia Eagles on December 3, Cooper tore his bicep muscle, ending his season. He was placed on the injured reserve list on December 4.

=== Oakland Raiders ===
On July 15, 2019, Cooper signed with the Oakland Raiders. He was declared inactive in the first 2 games of the season. He was released on September 17.
