= Ted Larsen =

American football player (born 1987)

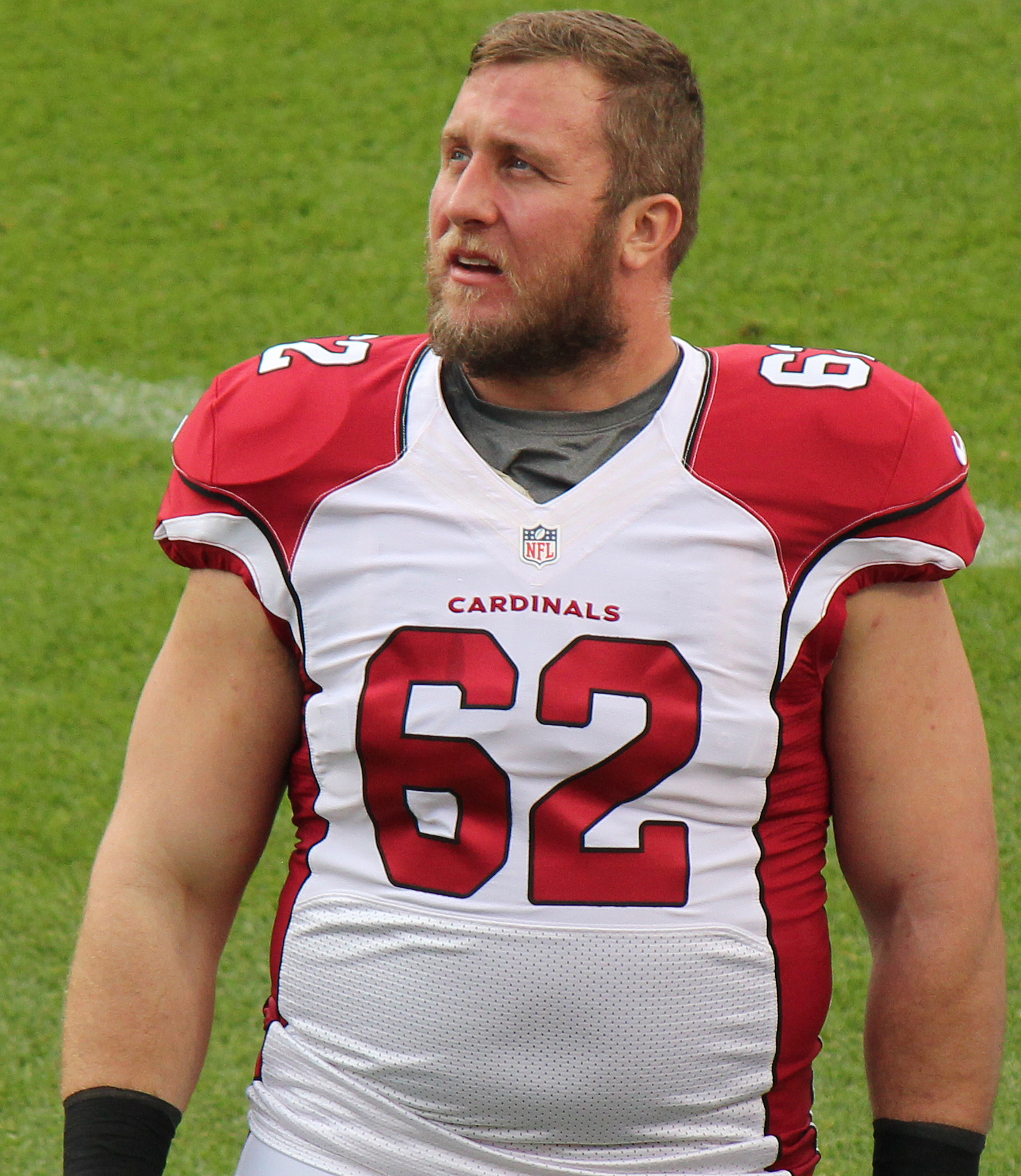
- Larsen with the Arizona Cardinals in 2015

No. 62
- Position: Guard

Personal information
- Born: June 13, 1987 (age 39); Miami, Florida, U.S.
- Listed height: 6 ft 3 in (1.91 m)
- Listed weight: 323 lb (147 kg)

Career information
- High school: Palm Harbor University (Palm Harbor, Florida)
- College: NC State
- NFL draft: 2010: 6th round, 205th overall pick

Career history
- New England Patriots (2010)*; Tampa Bay Buccaneers (2010–2013); Arizona Cardinals (2014–2015); Chicago Bears (2016); Miami Dolphins (2017–2018); Chicago Bears (2019); Tampa Bay Buccaneers (2020); New York Giants (2021)*
- * Offseason or practice squad member only

Awards and highlights
- Super Bowl champion (LV)

Career NFL statistics
- Games played: 137
- Games started: 88
- Stats at Pro Football Reference

Theodore Larsen (born June 13, 1987) is an American former professional football player who was a guard in the National Football League (NFL). He was selected by the New England Patriots in the sixth round of the 2010 NFL draft. He played college football for the NC State Wolfpack.

== Early life ==
Theodore Larsen was born the middle child of five children to Robert and Karen Larsen. In 1972–1976, Robert Larsen played defensive end at Wichita State in Wichita, Kansas. As a young kid, Ted played baseball, basketball and soccer. It was not until high school that Larsen played football. Larsen attended Palm Harbor University High School in Palm Harbor, Florida, where he played football as a defensive lineman. He started playing football his freshman year and was immediately put on the varsity team. In his junior year of high school, Larsen had 85 tackles and 15 sacks. He was named All-County second-team. That year, he not only participated and excelled in football but also did shot put and discus on the PHUHS track and field team. As a senior, he recorded 65 tackles and eight sacks, as well as a blocked kick, earning first-team all-county and District Player of the Year honors. That same year, he was named the district Player of the Year by The Florida Athletic Coaches Association. Not only was he a powerhouse on the field but also graduated Palm Harbor University High School with 3.8 GPA and a member of the National Honor Society.

== College career ==
In 2005, following his high school career, Larsen attended North Carolina State University. He redshirted his freshman season in 2005, working on the scout team as a defensive tackle. In 2006, Larsen played in 11 games at defensive tackle, starting two games and recording nine tackles and three sacks. In 2007, he played in 14 games as a reserve defensive tackle, recording 12 tackles and two sacks. In 2008, prior to his junior season, Larsen moved to the center position and was named to the Rimington Trophy watch list. After playing in 730 snaps, he was given the team's Outstanding Offensive Lineman award. In his 2009 senior season, Larsen was again named to the Rimington Trophy watch list. He started 12 games at center and allowed only one sack on the season. In two seasons as a defensive tackle, Larsen tallied 23 tackles, 4 sacks, 5.5 tackles-for-loss, one forced fumble, one pass defense, and 185 knockdowns/key blocks with 19 touchdowns which resulted in eight downfield blocks. He started 30 out of 43 games in his time at NC State, five as a defensive tackle and 25 as a center. In May 2009, Larsen graduated North Carolina State University with a degree in history.

== Professional career ==
Pre-draft measurables
Height	Weight	Arm length	Hand span	40-yard dash	10-yard split	20-yard split	20-yard shuttle	Three-cone drill	Vertical jump	Broad jump	Bench press
6 ft 2 5/8 in (1.90 m)	304 lb (138 kg)	32 in (0.81 m)	9 3/4 in (0.25 m)	5.27 s	1.85 s	3.06 s	4.66 s	7.81 s	24 in (0.61 m)	8 ft 0 in (2.44 m)	26 reps
All values from NFL Scouting Combine.

=== New England Patriots ===
Larsen was selected by the New England Patriots in the sixth round (205th overall) of the 2010 NFL draft. On May 18, he signed a four-year contract with the Patriots. He was described in his pick analysis as follows:

"Larsen was a three-year defensive lineman who moved to center for his final two years at State. He is a good athlete for the position with initial quickness and above-average lateral range in pass pro. He needs work on leveraging his blocks in spite of having natural leverage angles due to his size and still needs to improve his instincts when it comes to picking up stunts and twists up front. A lot of his issues can be improved with time at the position, and he should provide a team with a good backup for a year or two as he develops his instincts and techniques."

Upon being drafted he became the first student in Palm Harbor University High School's history to be drafted. In the preseason with the Patriots he played guard. However, in September 2010, he was waived by the Patriots and was claimed by his hometown team, the Tampa Bay Buccaneers.

=== Tampa Bay Buccaneers (first stint) ===
On September 5, 2010, Larsen was claimed off waivers by the Tampa Bay Buccaneers. He started at left guard beginning in the sixth game, replacing the soon-to-be released Keydrick Vincent. During the 2011 season, Larsen appeared in all 16 games, of which he started three, for the Buccaneers while rotating between guard and center.

In 2012, he appeared in all 16 games again and started 13 at the center position while being part of an offensive line that helped rookie running back Doug Martin rush for 1,454 yards and quarterback Josh Freeman throw for 4,065 yards, which were career high and franchise records. And his career highlights include his NFL debut in 2010 against the St. Louis Rams and the 16th game of that year against Seattle, where he helped the offense rush for 439 yards, which was the season-high for 2010, and earned the offensive line Madden Most Valuable Protectors honors for Week 16. He started as a center in 2012 against Oakland, where he helped the offense gain 515 yards from scrimmage, leading to the second-most total yards in the history of the Buccaneers. Larsen became an unrestricted free agent at the end of the season.

=== Arizona Cardinals ===
On March 12, 2014, Larsen was signed by the Arizona Cardinals. He started all 16 games for Arizona in the 2014 season.

=== Chicago Bears (first stint) ===
On March 30, 2016, Larsen signed a one-year contract with the Chicago Bears.

=== Miami Dolphins ===
On March 9, 2017, Larsen signed a three-year contract with the Miami Dolphins. On September 4, 2017, he was placed on injured reserve with the expectation to return in 2017. He was activated off injured reserve on November 4, 2017. He then started the final eight games of the season at left guard.

On December 9, 2018, Larsen made a crucial block in the Miracle In Miami nearly 40 yards past the line of scrimmage.

On March 7, 2019, Larsen was released by the Dolphins.

=== Chicago Bears (second stint) ===
On March 13, 2019, Larsen signed a one-year contract with the Chicago Bears.

=== Tampa Bay Buccaneers (second stint) ===
On December 8, 2020, Larsen signed with the practice squad of the Tampa Bay Buccaneers. He was elevated to the active roster on December 18 for the team's week 15 game against the Atlanta Falcons, and reverted to the practice squad after the game. He was elevated to the active roster again on January 8, January 16, January 23, and February 6 for the team's wild card playoff game, divisional playoff game, NFC Championship Game, and Super Bowl LV against the Washington Football Team, New Orleans Saints, Green Bay Packers, and Kansas City Chiefs, and reverted to the practice squad again following each game. His practice squad contract with the team expired after the season on February 16, 2021.

=== New York Giants ===
On August 13, 2021, Larsen signed with the New York Giants. He was placed on injured reserve on August 31, 2021. He was released on September 9.

== Personal life ==
Larsen is described as having a calm and monotone demeanor yet can be aggressive, and he is sometimes considered mean on the field. He describes his early life as being the middle of five children, with an older sister, Kristin, and older brother, Brian, and a younger brother, Chris, and sister, Melissa, with a 15-year age difference between his closest siblings.

Off the field, he enjoys fishing and skiing and has said that after football he would like to be a competitive fisherman. It was fishing that led him, on April 27, 2011, to rescue three young kayakers off Honeymoon Island. Larsen was with his girlfriend on his 24-foot boat; fishing in the choppy gulf waters right off the island. It was around 3 PM when he heard the Coast Guard signal that the three kayakers were in need of some help. Upon hearing this, he realized he was close to the area and plucked the two kayaks and three kayakers onto his boat and took them to shore. The young men did not know who had saved them but were grateful. Larsen said later "It was good to help them. It just felt like it was a good thing to do."

While with the Buccaneers, he has helped with the Metropolitan Ministries preparing food and spending time with children, volunteered his time with the Buccaneers' annual Halloween Celebrations, distributed food for Thanksgiving, sang for hospital patients during the holidays, and surprised single mothers with gifts during the Christmas holiday.

After his NFL career, Theodore enrolled in Duke's Fuqua business school to get his MBA.
