= 2016 Arizona Cardinals season =

NFL team season

- Owner: Bill Bidwill
- General manager: Steve Keim
- Head coach: Bruce Arians
- Home stadium: University of Phoenix Stadium

Results
- Record: 7–8–1
- Division place: 2nd NFC West
- Playoffs: Did not qualify
- All-Pros: 3: FLEX David Johnson (1st team); RB David Johnson (2nd team); DE Calais Campbell (2nd team)
- Pro Bowlers: 3: WR Larry Fitzgerald; RB David Johnson; CB Patrick Peterson

Uniform
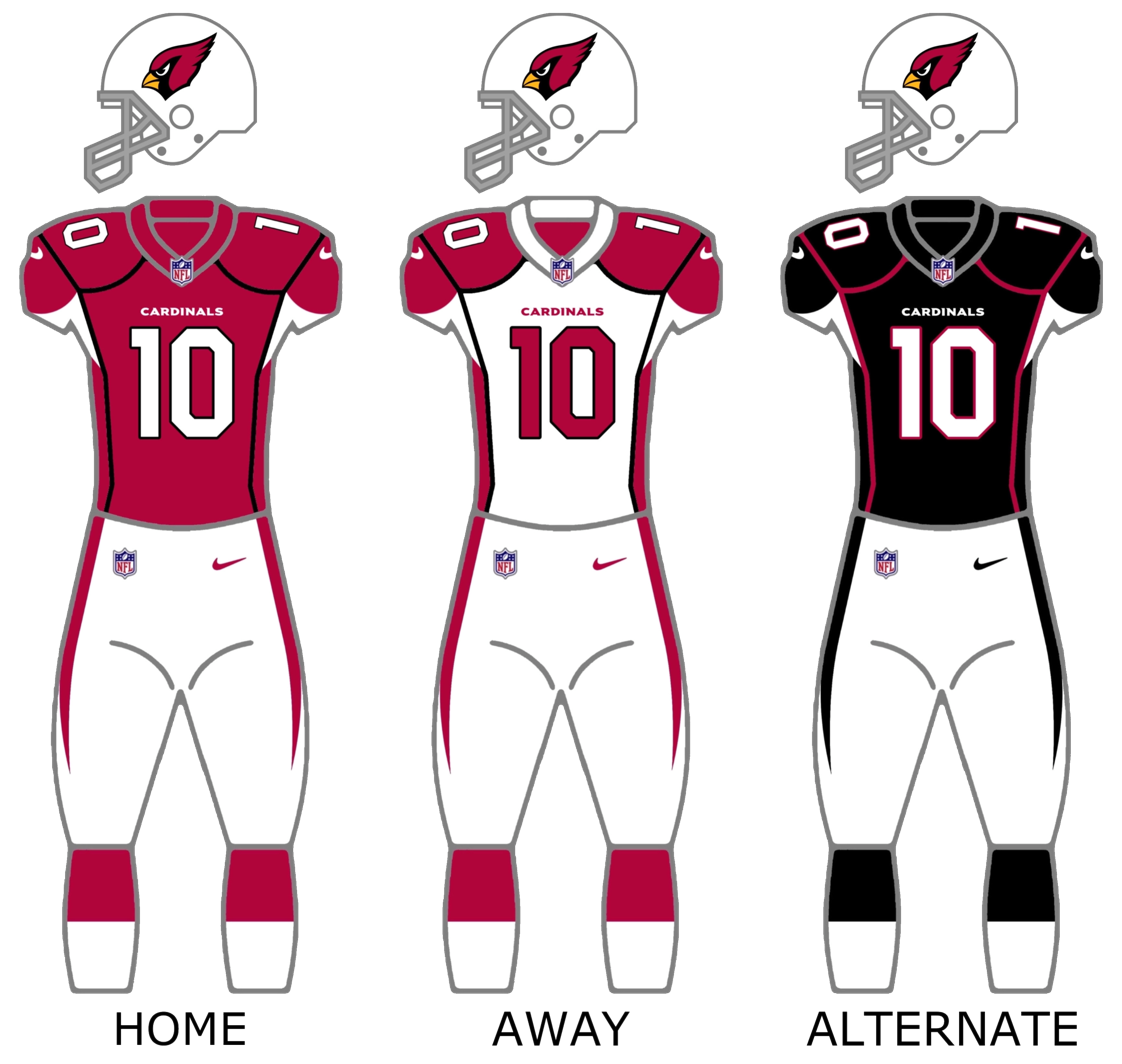

The 2016 season was the Arizona Cardinals' 97th in the National Football League (NFL), their 118th overall, their 29th in Arizona, their 11th at University of Phoenix Stadium and their fourth under head coach Bruce Arians.

In free agency, they signed veteran defensive back Tyvon Branch and veteran lineman Evan Mathis, while re-signing several key players. They traded for Chandler Jones from the New England Patriots, sending Jonathan Cooper and a late second-round pick to New England.

The Cardinals came into the 2016 season with expectations of improving on their 2015 campaign and reaching the Super Bowl. However, after a 1–3 start, they suffered injuries to quarterback Carson Palmer and most of the offensive line. On October 23, the Cardinals and the Seattle Seahawks played out a 6–6 tie; this was the Cardinals' first tie since 1986 when they were the St. Louis Cardinals. It was also the lowest-scoring NFL tie since overtime was introduced in 1974. The Cardinals were eliminated from playoff contention for the first time since 2013 in Week 15 after a loss to the New Orleans Saints. Despite winning their final two games, the Cardinals ended the season with a losing record at 7–8–1. Because the Chicago Cubs won the 2016 World Series, their first title in 108 years, the Cardinals also finished the season with the longest active championship drought in the four major American professional sports, with their last championship in 1947 as the Chicago Cardinals.

== Free agents ==
Position	Player	Tag	2016 Team	Notes
WR	Jaron Brown	RFA	ARI	one-year deal
TE	Jermaine Gresham	UFA	ARI	one-year deal
TE	Darren Fells	UFA	ARI	one-year deal
TE	Ifeanyi Momah	ERFA	ARI	one-year deal
QB	Drew Stanton	UFA	ARI	two-year deal
RB	Chris Johnson	RFA	ARI	one-year deal
P	Drew Butler	UFA	ARI	two-year deal
LS	Mike Leach	UFA	---	retired
G	Ted Larsen	UFA	CHI	one-year deal
C	Lyle Sendlein	UFA	---	retired
T	Bobby Massie	UFA	CHI	three-year deal
T	Kelvin Palmer	UFA	TB	one-year deal
T	Bradley Sowell	UFA	SEA	one-year deal
S	Tony Jefferson	RFA	ARI	one-year deal
S	D. J. Swearinger	RFA	ARI	one-year deal
S	Rashad Johnson	UFA	TEN	one-year deal
S	Chris Clemons	UFA	ARI	one-year deal
CB	Jerraud Powers	UFA	BAL	one-year deal
CB	Corey White	UFA	BUF	one-year deal
DE	Billy Winn	RFA	DEN	one-year deal
ILB	Sean Weatherspoon	UFA	ATL	one-year deal
ILB	Kenny Demens	ERFA	ARI	one-year deal
OLB	LaMarr Woodley	UFA	TBA	
OLB	Dwight Freeney	UFA	ATL	one-year deal
DE	Josh Mauro	ERFA	ARI	one-year deal
DE	Red Bryant	UFA	ARI	one-year deal

Player re-signed by the Cardinals

== Draft ==
2016 Arizona Cardinals Draft
Round	Selection	Player	Position	College
1	29	Robert Nkemdiche	DE	Ole Miss
3	92	Brandon Williams	CB	Texas A&M
4	128	Evan Boehm	C	Missouri
5	167	Marqui Christian	S	Midwestern State
5	170	Cole Toner	OT	Harvard
6	205	Harlan Miller	CB	Southeastern Louisiana

Notes

- The Cardinals traded their second-round selection (No. 61 overall) and guard Jonathan Cooper to the New England Patriots in exchange for defensive end Chandler Jones.
- The Cardinals traded a conditional seventh-round selection to the Philadelphia Eagles in exchange for quarterback Matt Barkley; the Eagles will only receive this selection if Barkley is on the Cardinals' roster for at least six games during the 2015 season.
- The Cardinals received a sixth-round compensatory pick (No. 170 overall) as the result of a negative differential of free agent signings and departures that the Cardinals experienced during the 2015 free agency period.

== Staff ==
2016 Arizona Cardinals staff
Front office: Owner/chairman – Bill Bidwill; President – Michael Bidwill; general manager – Steve Keim; Vice president of player personnel – Terry McDonough; Director of college scouting – Dru Grigson; Director of pro scouting – Quentin Harris; Assistant director of pro scouting – Malik Boyd; Director of football administration – Mike Disner; Head coaches: Head coach – Bruce Arians; Assistant head coach/offense – Tom Moore; Offensive coaches: Offensive coordinator/offensive line – Harold Goodwin; Quarterbacks – Freddie Kitchens; Running backs – Stump Mitchell; Wide receivers – Darryl Drake; Tight ends – Rick Christophel; Assistant tight ends/assistant special teams – Steve Heiden; Assistant offensive line – Larry Zierlein; Offensive assistant – Kevin Garver	Defensive coaches: Defensive coordinator – James Bettcher; Defensive line – Brentson Buckner; Outside linebackers – Bob Sanders; Inside linebackers – Larry Foote; Defensive backs – Nick Rapone; Cornerbacks – Kevin Ross; Defensive assistant/defensive backs – Mike Chiurco; Pass rush specialist – Tom Pratt; Special teams coaches: Special teams coordinator – Amos Jones; Assistant special teams – Anthony Blevins; Strength and conditioning: Strength and conditioning – Buddy Morris; Assistant strength and conditioning – Roger Kingdom

== Final roster ==
2016 Arizona Cardinals roster
Quarterbacks (QB): 4 Zac Dysert; 3 Carson Palmer; 5 Drew Stanton; Running backs (RB): 38 Andre Ellington; 31 David Johnson; 30 Stepfan Taylor; 33 Kerwynn Williams; Wide receivers (WR): 12 John Brown; 18 Marquis Bundy; 11 Larry Fitzgerald; 10 Brittan Golden; 14 J. J. Nelson; 16 Jeremy Ross; Tight ends (TE): 85 Darren Fells; 84 Jermaine Gresham; 89 Hakeem Valles	Offensive linemen (OL): 70 Evan Boehm G/C; 74 D. J. Humphries T; 76 Mike Iupati G; 63 Givens Price T; 53 A. Q. Shipley C; 61 Cole Toner T; 78 Earl Watford G; 73 John Wetzel T; Defensive linemen (DL): 93 Calais Campbell DE; 95 Rodney Gunter DE; 96 Kareem Martin DE; 97 Josh Mauro DE; 90 Robert Nkemdiche DE; 72 Olsen Pierre DE; 98 Corey Peters NT; 92 Frostee Rucker DE; 91 Ed Stinson DE; 94 Xavier Williams NT	Linebackers (LB): 44 Markus Golden OLB; 52 Zaviar Gooden ILB; 55 Chandler Jones OLB; 51 Kevin Minter ILB; 54 Sio Moore ILB; 57 Alex Okafor OLB; 58 Scooby Wright ILB; Defensive backs (DB): 28 Justin Bethel CB; 25 Christian Bryant SS; 41 Marcus Cooper CB; 37 Brian Dixon CB; 45 Trevon Hartfield FS; 34 Harlan Miller FS; 21 Patrick Peterson CB; 36 D. J. Swearinger S; 26 Brandon Williams CB; Special teams (ST): 46 Aaron Brewer LS; 7 Chandler Catanzaro K; 6 Matt Wile P	Practice squad: 56 Cap Capi OLB; 42 Reshard Cliett OLB; 79 Aaron Epps T; 17 Marvin Hall WR; 19 Chris Hubert WR; 71 Kaleb Johnson G; 86 Brian Leonhardt TE; 62 Daniel Munyer C; 35 Elijhaa Penny RB; 29 Ronald Zamort CB; Reserve: 65 Taylor Boggs G (IR); 39 Elie Bouka CB (IR); 27 Tyvon Branch SS (IR); 13 Jaron Brown WR (IR); 20 Deone Bucannon ILB (IR); 59 Alani Fua OLB (IR); 22 Tony Jefferson SS (IR); 43 Mike Jenkins CB (IR); 75 Ulrick John T (IR); 23 Chris Johnson RB (IR); 50 Gabe Martin ILB (IR); 32 Tyrann Mathieu FS (IR); 69 Evan Mathis G (IR); 80 Ifeanyi Momah TE (IR); 87 Troy Niklas TE (IR); 68 Jared Veldheer T (IR); 58 Daryl Washington ILB (Susp.); Rookies in italics 53 active, 17 reserve, 10 practice squad

== Preseason ==
Week	Date	Opponent	Result	Record	Venue	Recap
1	August 12	Oakland Raiders	L 10–31	0–1	University of Phoenix Stadium	Recap
2	August 19	at San Diego Chargers	L 3–19	0–2	Qualcomm Stadium	Recap
3	August 28	at Houston Texans	L 24–34	0–3	NRG Stadium	Recap
4	September 1	Denver Broncos	W 38–17	1–3	University of Phoenix Stadium	Recap

== Regular season ==
=== Schedule ===
Week	Date	Opponent	Result	Record	Venue	Recap
1	September 11	New England Patriots	**L** 21–23	0–1	University of Phoenix Stadium	Recap
2	September 18	Tampa Bay Buccaneers	**W** 40–7	1–1	University of Phoenix Stadium	Recap
3	September 25	at Buffalo Bills	**L** 18–33	1–2	New Era Field	Recap
4	October 2	**Los Angeles Rams**	**L** 13–17	1–3	University of Phoenix Stadium	Recap
5	October 6	at **San Francisco 49ers**	**W** 33–21	2–3	Levi's Stadium	Recap
6	October 17	New York Jets	**W** 28–3	3–3	University of Phoenix Stadium	Recap
7	October 23	**Seattle Seahawks**	**T** 6–6 (OT)	3–3–1	University of Phoenix Stadium	Recap
8	October 30	at Carolina Panthers	**L** 20–30	3–4–1	Bank of America Stadium	Recap
9	Bye					
10	November 13	**San Francisco 49ers**	**W** 23–20	4–4–1	University of Phoenix Stadium	Recap
11	November 20	at Minnesota Vikings	**L** 24–30	4–5–1	U.S. Bank Stadium	Recap
12	November 27	at Atlanta Falcons	**L** 19–38	4–6–1	Georgia Dome	Recap
13	December 4	Washington Redskins	**W** 31–23	5–6–1	University of Phoenix Stadium	Recap
14	December 11	at Miami Dolphins	**L** 23–26	5–7–1	Hard Rock Stadium	Recap
15	December 18	New Orleans Saints	**L** 41–48	5–8–1	University of Phoenix Stadium	Recap
16	December 24	at **Seattle Seahawks**	**W** 34–31	6–8–1	CenturyLink Field	Recap
17	January 1	at **Los Angeles Rams**	**W** 44–6	7–8–1	Los Angeles Memorial Coliseum	Recap

Note: Intra-division opponents are in bold text.

=== Game summaries ===
==== Week 1: vs. New England Patriots ====
Week One: New England Patriots at Arizona Cardinals – Game summary

Quarter	1	2	3	4	Total
**Patriots**	10	0	7	6	**23**
Cardinals	0	7	7	7	**21**

at University of Phoenix Stadium, Glendale, Arizona

- Date: September 11
- Game time: 5:30 p.m.
- Game weather: Played indoors (retractable roof closed)
- Game attendance: 64,864
- Referee: Tony Corrente
- TV announcers (NBC): Al Michaels, Cris Collinsworth and Michele Tafoya
- Recap, Gamebook

Game information

**First quarter**

- NE – Chris Hogan 37-yard pass from Jimmy Garoppolo (Stephen Gostkowski kick), 7:34. Patriots 7–0. **Drive: 8 plays, 74 yards, 4:13.**
- NE – Stephen Gostkowski 47-yard field goal, 1:00. Patriots 10–0. **Drive: 12 plays, 63 yards, 5:12.**

**Second quarter**

- ARI – Larry Fitzgerald 3-yard pass from Carson Palmer (Chandler Catanzaro kick), 4:06. Patriots 10–7. **Drive: 11 plays, 54 yards, 6:20.**

**Third quarter**

- NE – LeGarrette Blount 8-yard run (Stephen Gostkowski kick), 10:00. Patriots 17–7. **Drive: 9 plays, 75 yards, 5:00.**
- ARI – David Johnson 1-yard run (Chandler Catanzaro kick), 4:29. Patriots 17–14. **Drive: 5 plays, 33 yards, 1:51.**

**Fourth quarter**

- NE – Stephen Gostkowski 53-yard field goal, 12:35. Patriots 20–14. **Drive: 11 plays, 40 yards, 6:54.**
- ARI – Larry Fitzgerald 1-yard pass from Carson Palmer (Chandler Catanzaro kick), 9:46. Cardinals 20–21. **Drive: 7 plays, 79 yards, 2:49.**
- NE – Stephen Gostkowski 32-yard field goal, 3:44. Patriots 23–21. **Drive: 13 plays, 61 yards, 6:02.**

**Top passers**

- NE – Jimmy Garoppolo – 24/33, 264 yards, TD
- ARI – Carson Palmer – 24/37, 271 yards, 2 TD

**Top rushers**

- NE – LeGarrette Blount – 22 rushes, 70 yards, TD
- ARI – David Johnson – 16 rushes, 89 yards, TD

**Top receivers**

- NE – Julian Edelman – 7 receptions, 66 yards
- ARI – Larry Fitzgerald – 8 receptions, 81 yards, 2 TD

With Patriots quarterback Tom Brady suspended and Jimmy Garoppolo starting, the Cardinals were huge favorites to win. The game was close, but was lost last minute, with a missed game-winning Cardinals field goal.

==== Week 2: vs. Tampa Bay Buccaneers ====
Week Two: Tampa Bay Buccaneers at Arizona Cardinals – Game summary

Quarter	1	2	3	4	Total
Buccaneers	0	0	7	0	**7**
**Cardinals**	0	24	9	7	**40**

at University of Phoenix Stadium, Glendale, Arizona

- Date: September 18
- Game time: 1:05 p.m.
- Game weather: Played indoors (retractable roof closed)
- Game attendance: 64,230
- Referee: Ronald Torbert
- TV announcers (Fox): Thom Brennaman, Charles Davis and Peter Schrager
- Recap, Gamebook

Game information

**First quarter**

- No scoring plays

**Second quarter**

- ARI – Larry Fitzgerald 4-yard pass from Carson Palmer (Chandler Catanzaro kick), 14:59. Cardinals 7–0. **Drive: 11 plays, 57 yards, 5:12.**
- ARI – Chandler Catanzaro 22-yard field goal, 11:48. Cardinals 10–0. **Drive: 6 plays, 14 yards, 2:21.**
- ARI – Michael Floyd 1-yard pass from Carson Palmer (Chandler Catanzaro kick), 1:35. Cardinals 17–0. **Drive: 8 plays, 68 yards, 1:36.**
- ARI – Jaron Brown 51-yard pass from Carson Palmer (Chandler Catanzaro kick), 0:26. Cardinals 24–0. **Drive: 4 plays, 84 yards, 0:45.**

**Third quarter**

- TB – Mike Evans 19-yard pass from Jameis Winston (Roberto Aguayo kick), 10:06. Cardinals 24–7. **Drive: 11 plays, 75 yards, 4:59.**
- ARI – Chandler Catanzaro 40-yard field goal, 8:00. Cardinals 27–7. **Drive: 5 plays, 53 yards, 2:05.**
- ARI – Marcus Cooper 60-yard interception return (kick failed, wide left), 5:15. Cardinals 33–7.

**Fourth quarter**

- ARI – Chris Johnson 3-yard run (Chandler Catanzaro kick), 12:15. Cardinals 40–7. **Drive: 8 plays, 65 yards, 4:47.**

**Top passers**

- TB – Jameis Winston – 27/52, 243 yards, TD, 4 INT
- ARI – Carson Palmer – 17/30, 304 yards, 3 TD

**Top rushers**

- TB – Jacquizz Rodgers – 2 rushes, 29 yards
- ARI – Chris Johnson – 16 rushes, 54 yards, TD

**Top receivers**

- TB – Mike Evans – 6 receptions, 70 yards, TD
- ARI – David Johnson – 3 receptions, 98 yards

==== Week 3: at Buffalo Bills ====
Week Three: Arizona Cardinals at Buffalo Bills – Game summary

Quarter	1	2	3	4	Total
Cardinals	0	7	6	5	**18**
**Bills**	10	7	13	3	**33**

at New Era Field, Orchard Park, New York

- Date: September 25
- Game time: 10:00 a.m.
- Game weather: 64 °F (18 °C), sunny
- Game attendance: 68,647
- Referee: Walt Anderson
- TV announcers (Fox): Kenny Albert, Daryl Johnston and Laura Okmin
- Recap, Gamebook

Game information

**First quarter**

- BUF – Dan Carpenter 19-yard field goal, 3:29. Bills 3–0. **Drive: 7 plays, 77 yards, 3:51.**
- BUF – LeSean McCoy 24-yard run (Dan Carpenter kick), 0:55. Bills 10–0. **Drive: 5 plays, 53 yards, 1:30.**

**Second quarter**

- BUF – LeSean McCoy 5-yard run (Dan Carpenter kick), 10:25. Bills 17–0. **Drive: 6 plays, 52 yards, 2:51.**
- ARI – David Johnson 4-yard run (Chandler Catanzaro kick), 1:05. Bills 17–7. **Drive: 17 plays, 84 yards, 9:20.**

**Third quarter**

- BUF – Tyrod Taylor 20-yard run (kick failed, wide right), 10:31. Bills 23–7. **Drive: 6 plays, 47 yards, 2:49.**
- BUF – Aaron Williams 53-yard fumble return (Dan Carpenter kick), 2:25. Bills 30–7.
- ARI – David Johnson 22-yard run (pass failed), 0:12. Bills 30–13. **Drive: 6 plays, 83 yards, 2:13.**

**Fourth quarter**

- ARI – Chandler Catanzaro 60-yard field goal, 10:36. Bills 30–16. **Drive: 5 plays, 4 yards, 2:19.**
- BUF – Dan Carpenter 45-yard field goal, 4:48. Bills 33–16. **Drive: 4 plays, 3 yards, 1:42.**
- ARI – LeSean McCoy tackled in the end zone by Corey Peters for a safety, 3:04. Bills 33–18.

**Top passers**

- ARI – Carson Palmer – 26/50, 287 yards, 4 INT
- BUF – Tyrod Taylor – 14/25, 119 yards, INT

**Top rushers**

- ARI – David Johnson – 19 rushes, 83 yards, 2 TD
- BUF – LeSean McCoy – 17 rushes, 110 yards, 2 TD

**Top receivers**

- ARI – John Brown – 6 receptions, 70 yards
- BUF – Robert Woods – 6 receptions, 51 yards

==== Week 4: vs. Los Angeles Rams ====
Week Four: Los Angeles Rams at Arizona Cardinals – Game summary

Quarter	1	2	3	4	Total
**Rams**	7	3	0	7	**17**
Cardinals	0	10	3	0	**13**

at University of Phoenix Stadium, Glendale, Arizona

- Date: October 2
- Game time: 1:25 p.m.
- Game weather: Played indoors (retractable roof closed)
- Game attendance: 64,622
- Referee: Gene Steratore
- TV announcers (Fox): Thom Brennaman, Charles Davis and Peter Schrager
- Recap, Gamebook

Game information

**First quarter**

- LA – Brian Quick 65-yard pass from Case Keenum (Greg Zuerlein kick), 1:59. Rams 7–0. **Drive: 7 plays, 90 yards, 3:28.**

**Second quarter**

- ARI – Chandler Catanzaro 25-yard field goal, 12:19. Rams 7–3. **Drive: 12 plays, 68 yards, 4:40.**
- LA – Greg Zuerlein 29-yard field goal, 8:42. Rams 10–3. **Drive: 8 plays, 64 yards, 3:37.**
- ARI – Michael Floyd 5-yard pass from Carson Palmer (Chandler Catanzaro kick), 0:24. Tied 10–10. **Drive: 8 plays, 80 yards, 1:24.**

**Third quarter**

- ARI – Chandler Catanzaro 21-yard field goal, 0:00. Cardinals 13–10. **Drive: 12 plays, 72 yards, 5:05.**

**Fourth quarter**

- LA – Brian Quick 4-yard pass from Case Keenum (Greg Zuerlein kick), 2:36. Rams 17–13. **Drive: 5 plays, 19 yards, 2:33.**

**Top passers**

- LA – Case Keenum – 18/30, 266 yards, 2 TD
- ARI – Carson Palmer – 23/36, 288 yards, TD, INT

**Top rushers**

- LA – Todd Gurley – 19 rushes, 33 yards
- ARI – David Johnson – 17 rushes, 83 yards

**Top receivers**

- LA – Kenny Britt – 4 receptions, 82 yards
- ARI – John Brown – 10 receptions, 144 yards

==== Week 5: at San Francisco 49ers ====
Week Five: Arizona Cardinals at San Francisco 49ers – Game summary

Quarter	1	2	3	4	Total
**Cardinals**	0	7	14	12	**33**
49ers	0	7	7	7	**21**

at Levi's Stadium, Santa Clara, California

- Date: October 6
- Game time: 5:25 p.m.
- Game weather: 75 °F (24 °C), clear
- Game attendance: 70,178
- Referee: Carl Cheffers
- TV announcers (CBS/NFLN/Twitter): Jim Nantz, Phil Simms and Tracy Wolfson
- Recap, Gamebook

Game information

**First quarter**

- No scoring plays

**Second quarter**

- SF – Jeremy Kerley 9-yard pass from Blaine Gabbert (Phil Dawson kick), 4:12. 49ers 7–0. **Drive: 10 plays, 87 yards, 4:46.**
- ARI – Larry Fitzgerald 21-yard pass from Drew Stanton (Chandler Catanzaro kick), 1:40. Tied 7–7. **Drive: 1 play, 21 yards, 0:06.**

**Third quarter**

- ARI – David Johnson 4-yard run (Chandler Catanzaro kick), 12:45. Cardinals 14–7. **Drive: 4 plays, 14 yards, 2:10.**
- ARI – Larry Fitzgerald 29-yard pass from Drew Stanton (Chandler Catanzaro kick), 7:35. Cardinals 21–7. **Drive: 6 plays, 71 yards, 3:19.**
- SF – Carlos Hyde 1-yard run (Phil Dawson kick), 1:54. Cardinals 21–14. **Drive: 11 plays, 82 yards, 5:41.**

**Fourth quarter**

- ARI – Chandler Catanzaro 36-yard field goal, 13:39. Cardinals 24–14. **Drive: 4 plays, 6 yards, 1:16.**
- ARI – David Johnson 2-yard run (Chandler Catanzaro kick), 4:44. Cardinals 31–14. **Drive: 12 plays, 76 yards, 7:12.**
- SF – Blaine Gabbert 1-yard run (Phil Dawson kick), 1:52. Cardinals 31–21. **Drive: 13 plays, 75 yards, 2:52.**
- ARI – Blaine Gabbert sacked in the end zone by Calais Campbell for a safety, 1:17. Cardinals 33–21.

**Top passers**

- ARI – Drew Stanton – 11/28, 124 yards, 2 TD
- SF – Blaine Gabbert – 18/31, 162 yards, TD, 2 INT

**Top rushers**

- ARI – David Johnson – 27 rushes, 157 yards, 2 TD
- SF – Carlos Hyde – 22 rushes, 78 yards, TD

**Top receivers**

- ARI – Larry Fitzgerald – 6 receptions, 81 yards, 2 TD
- SF – Jeremy Kerley – 8 receptions, 102 yards, TD

==== Week 6: vs. New York Jets ====
Week Six: New York Jets at Arizona Cardinals – Game summary

Quarter	1	2	3	4	Total
Jets	0	3	0	0	**3**
**Cardinals**	7	7	7	7	**28**

at University of Phoenix Stadium, Glendale, Arizona

- Date: October 17
- Game time: 5:30 p.m.
- Game weather: Played indoors (retractable roof closed)
- Game attendance: 64,709
- Referee: Jerome Boger
- TV announcers (ESPN): Sean McDonough, Jon Gruden and Lisa Salters
- Recap, Gamebook

Game information

**First quarter**

- ARI – David Johnson 58-yard run (Chandler Catanzaro kick), 9:51. Cardinals 7–0. **Drive: 1 play, 58 yards, 0:12.**

**Second quarter**

- NYJ – Nick Folk 39-yard field goal, 12:06. Cardinals 7–3. **Drive: 7 plays, 58 yards, 3:11.**
- ARI – David Johnson 2-yard run (Chandler Catanzaro kick), 6:43. Cardinals 14–3. **Drive: 11 plays, 75 yards, 5:23.**

**Third quarter**

- ARI – David Johnson 2-yard run (Chandler Catanzaro kick), 5:24. Cardinals 21–3. **Drive: 14 plays, 68 yards, 7:37.**

**Fourth quarter**

- ARI – Michael Floyd 9-yard pass from Carson Palmer (Chandler Catanzaro kick), 8:20. Cardinals 28–3. **Drive: 14 plays, 89 yards, 7:26.**

**Top passers**

- NYJ – Ryan Fitzpatrick – 16/31, 174 yards, INT
- ARI – Carson Palmer – 23/34, 213 yards, TD

**Top rushers**

- NYJ – Matt Forte – 9 rushes, 19 yards
- ARI – David Johnson – 22 rushes, 111 yards, 3 TD

**Top receivers**

- NYJ – Brandon Marshall – 3 receptions, 70 yards
- ARI – John Brown – 5 receptions, 54 yards

This was the Cardinals' first win over the Jets since 1975, when the Cardinals were based in St. Louis, Missouri.

==== Week 7: vs. Seattle Seahawks ====
Week Seven: Seattle Seahawks at Arizona Cardinals – Game summary

Quarter	1	2	3	4	OT	Total
Seahawks	0	0	0	3	3	**6**
Cardinals	0	3	0	0	3	**6**

at University of Phoenix Stadium, Glendale, Arizona

- Date: October 23
- Game time: 5:30 p.m.
- Game weather: Played indoors (retractable roof closed)
- Game attendance: 65,089
- Referee: Terry McAulay
- TV announcers (NBC): Al Michaels, Cris Collinsworth and Michele Tafoya
- Recap, Gamebook

Game information

**First quarter**

- No scoring plays

**Second quarter**

- ARI – Chandler Catanzaro 46-yard field goal, 3:11. Cardinals 3–0. **Drive: 15 plays, 53 yards, 8:24.**

**Third quarter**

- No scoring plays

**Fourth quarter**

- SEA – Steven Hauschka 40-yard field goal, 4:00. Tied 3–3. **Drive: 4 plays, 0 yards, 0:33.**

**Overtime**

- ARI – Chandler Catanzaro 45-yard field goal, 11:23. Cardinals 6–3. **Drive: 9 plays, 48 yards, 3:37.**
- SEA – Steven Hauschka 36-yard field goal, 6:42. Tied 6–6. **Drive: 9 plays, 57 yards, 4:41.**

**Top passers**

- SEA – Russell Wilson – 24/37, 225 yards
- ARI – Carson Palmer – 29/49, 342 yards

**Top rushers**

- SEA – Christine Michael – 16 rushes, 52 yards
- ARI – David Johnson – 33 rushes, 113 yards

**Top receivers**

- SEA – Doug Baldwin – 6 receptions, 69 yards
- ARI – J. J. Nelson – 3 receptions, 84 yards

Cardinals placekicker Chandler Catanzaro and Seahawks placekicker Steven Hauschka each miss game winning field goals as the game finishes in a 6-6 tie and the Cardinals earn their first tie since the 1986 season.

==== Week 8: at Carolina Panthers ====
Week Eight: Arizona Cardinals at Carolina Panthers – Game summary

Quarter	1	2	3	4	Total
Cardinals	0	7	7	6	**20**
**Panthers**	14	10	6	0	**30**

at Bank of America Stadium, Charlotte, North Carolina

- Date: October 30
- Game time: 10:00 a.m.
- Game weather: 85 °F (29 °C), sunny
- Game attendance: 74,088
- Referee: Walt Coleman
- TV announcers (Fox): Sam Rosen, Daryl Johnston and Laura Okmin
- Recap, Gamebook

Game information

**First quarter**

- CAR – Thomas Davis 46-yard fumble return (Graham Gano kick), 11:48. Panthers 7–0.
- CAR – Jonathan Stewart 2-yard run (Graham Gano kick), 2:24. Panthers 14–0. **Drive: 9 plays, 75 yards, 3:54.**

**Second quarter**

- CAR – Jonathan Stewart 1-yard run (Graham Gano kick), 11:05. Panthers 21–0. **Drive: 7 plays, 65 yards, 3:40.**
- CAR – Graham Gano 43-yard field goal, 2:45. Panthers 24–0. **Drive: 13 plays, 35 yards, 6:31.**
- ARI – J. J. Nelson 5-yard pass from Carson Palmer (Chandler Catanzaro kick), 0:20. Panthers 24–7. **Drive: 9 plays, 75 yards, 2:25.**

**Third quarter**

- CAR – Graham Gano 52-yard field goal, 11:56. Panthers 27–7. **Drive: 8 plays, 41 yards, 3:04.**
- CAR – Graham Gano 21-yard field goal, 7:18. Panthers 30–7. **Drive: 9 plays, 55 yards, 3:07.**
- ARI – John Brown 17-yard pass from Carson Palmer (Chandler Catanzaro kick), 1:45. Panthers 30–14. **Drive: 10 plays, 75 yards, 5:33.**

**Fourth quarter**

- ARI – J. J. Nelson 4-yard pass from Carson Palmer (pass failed), 5:01. Panthers 30–20. **Drive: 14 plays, 92 yards, 4:49.**

**Top passers**

- ARI – Carson Palmer – 35/46, 363 yards, 3 TD, INT
- CAR – Cam Newton – 14/27, 212 yards

**Top rushers**

- ARI – David Johnson – 10 rushes, 24 yards
- CAR – Jonathan Stewart – 25 rushes, 95 yards, 2 TD

**Top receivers**

- ARI – David Johnson – 7 receptions, 84 yards
- CAR – Kelvin Benjamin – 2 receptions, 73 yards

In a rematch of the NFC championship, the Panthers led by as much as 24 points until Arizona ended the game by cutting the lead to 10.

==== Week 10: vs. San Francisco 49ers ====
Week Ten: San Francisco 49ers at Arizona Cardinals – Game summary

Quarter	1	2	3	4	Total
49ers	0	10	3	7	**20**
**Cardinals**	7	13	0	3	**23**

at University of Phoenix Stadium, Glendale, Arizona

- Date: November 13
- Game time: 2:25 p.m. MST
- Game weather: Played indoors (retractable roof closed)
- Game attendance: 65,127
- Referee: Brad Allen
- TV announcers (Fox): Chris Myers, Ronde Barber and Jennifer Hale
- Recap, Gamebook

Game information

**First quarter**

- ARI – David Johnson 3-yard pass from Carson Palmer (Chandler Catanzaro kick), 3:55. Cardinals 7–0. **Drive: 11 plays, 91 yards, 6:04.**

**Second quarter**

- ARI – David Johnson 18-yard run (Chandler Catanzaro kick), 14:42. Cardinals 14–0. **Drive: 1 play, 56 yards, 0:18.**
- SF – Jeremy Kerley 17-yard pass from Colin Kaepernick (Phil Dawson kick), 12:12. Cardinals 14–7. **Drive: 6 plays, 75 yards, 2:30.**
- ARI – Chandler Catanzaro 39-yard field goal, 8:28. Cardinals 17–7. **Drive: 8 plays, 54 yards, 3:44.**
- SF – Phil Dawson 49-yard field goal, 1:32. Cardinals 17–10. **Drive: 15 plays, 56 yards, 6:56.**
- ARI – Chandler Catanzaro 19-yard field goal, 0:00. Cardinals 20–10. **Drive: 10 plays, 81 yards, 1:32.**

**Third quarter**

- SF – Phil Dawson 53-yard field goal, 8:40. Cardinals 20–13. **Drive: 5 plays, 45 yards, 2:16.**

**Fourth quarter**

- SF – Colin Kaepernick 4-yard run (Phil Dawson kick), 1:55. Tied 20–20. **Drive: 7 plays, 57 yards, 1:18.**
- ARI – Chandler Catanzaro 34-yard field goal, 0:00. Cardinals 23–20. **Drive: 12 plays, 69 yards, 1:55.**

**Top passers**

- SF – Colin Kaepernick – 17/30, 210 yards, TD
- ARI – Carson Palmer – 30/49, 376 yards, TD, 2 INT

**Top rushers**

- SF – Colin Kaepernick – 10 rushes, 55 yards, TD
- ARI – David Johnson – 19 rushes, 55 yards, TD

**Top receivers**

- SF – Jeremy Kerley – 7 receptions, 71 yards, TD
- ARI – Larry Fitzgerald – 12 receptions, 133 yards

==== Week 11: at Minnesota Vikings ====
Week Eleven: Arizona Cardinals at Minnesota Vikings – Game summary

Quarter	1	2	3	4	Total
Cardinals	7	10	0	7	**24**
**Vikings**	7	13	10	0	**30**

at U.S. Bank Stadium, Minneapolis, Minnesota

- Date: November 20
- Game time: 12:00 pm. CST
- Game weather: Played indoors (domed stadium)
- Game attendance: 66,808
- Referee: Clete Blakeman
- TV announcers (Fox): Joe Buck, Troy Aikman and Erin Andrews
- Recap, Game Book

Game information

**First quarter**

- MIN – Adam Thielen 16-yard pass from Sam Bradford (Kai Forbath kick), 10:25. Vikings 7–0. **Drive: 5 plays, 44 yards, 2:54.**
- ARI – David Johnson 1-yard run (Chandler Catanzaro kick), 4:07. Tied 7–7. **Drive: 11 plays, 75 yards, 6:18.**

**Second quarter**

- ARI – Chandler Catanzaro 34-yard field goal, 10:04. Cardinals 10–7. **Drive: 12 plays, 78 yards, 6:26.**
- MIN – Matt Asiata 2-yard run (kick blocked), 7:16. Vikings 13–10. **Drive: 5 plays, 75 yards, 2:48.**
- MIN – Xavier Rhodes 100-yard interception return (Kai Forbath kick), 3:07. Vikings 20–10.
- ARI – Jermaine Gresham 29-yard pass from Carson Palmer (Chandler Catanzaro kick), 0:50. Vikings 20–17. **Drive: 7 plays, 75 yards, 2:17.**

**Third quarter**

- MIN – Cordarrelle Patterson 104-yard kickoff return (Kai Forbath kick), 14:47. Vikings 27–17.
- MIN – Kai Forbath 27-yard field goal, 0:04. Vikings 30–17. **Drive: 11 plays, 75 yards, 5:06.**

**Fourth quarter**

- ARI – David Johnson 4-yard pass (Chandler Catanzaro kick), 7:24. Vikings 30–24. **Drive: 6 plays, 27 yards, 1:46.**

**Top passers**

- ARI – Carson Palmer – 20/38, 198 yards, 2 TD, 2 INT
- MIN – Sam Bradford – 20/28, 169 yards, TD

**Top rushers**

- ARI – David Johnson – 22 rushes, 103 yards, TD
- MIN – Jerick McKinnon – 16 rushes, 44 yards

**Top receivers**

- ARI – Larry Fitzgerald – 6 rec, 63 yards
- MIN – Adam Thielen – 5 rec, 65 yards, TD

==== Week 12: at Atlanta Falcons ====
Week Twelve: Arizona Cardinals at Atlanta Falcons – Game summary

Quarter	1	2	3	4	Total
Cardinals	7	6	0	6	**19**
**Falcons**	7	10	7	14	**38**

at Georgia Dome, Atlanta, Georgia

- Date: November 27
- Game time: 11:00 am. MST
- Game weather: Played indoors (dome stadium)
- Game attendance: 69,233
- Referee: John Parry
- TV announcers (Fox): Kevin Burkhardt, John Lynch and Pam Oliver
- Recap, Gamebook

Game information

**First quarter**

- ARI – Jermaine Gresham 1-yard pass from Carson Palmer (Chandler Catanzaro kick), 9:39. Cardinals 7–0. **Drive: 9 plays, 75 yards, 5:21.**
- ATL – Devonta Freeman 1-yard run (Matt Bryant kick), 3:38. Tied 7–7. **Drive: 11 plays, 72 yards, 6:01.**

**Second quarter**

- ARI – Chandler Catanzaro 25-yard field goal, 12:52. Cardinals 10–7. **Drive: 11 plays, 68 yards, 5:46.**
- ATL – Matt Bryant 45-yard field goal, 8:30. Tied 10–10. **Drive: 9 plays, 48 yards, 4:22.**
- ATL – Taylor Gabriel 35-yard pass from Matt Ryan (Matt Bryant kick), 2:19. Falcons 17–10. **Drive: 2 plays, 45 yards, 0:51.**
- ARI – Chandler Catanzaro 54-yard field goal, 0:00. Falcons 17–13. **Drive: 4 plays, 27 yards, 0:25.**

**Third quarter**

- ATL – Tevin Coleman 2-yard run (Matt Bryant kick), 2:56. Falcons 24–13. **Drive: 13 plays, 77 yards, 6:05.**

**Fourth quarter**

- ATL – Taylor Gabriel 25-yard pass from Matt Ryan (Matt Bryant kick), 8:48. Falcons 31–13. **Drive: 10 plays, 60 yards, 5:29.**
- ARI – David Johnson 3-yard pass from Carson Palmer (pass failed), 4:44. Falcons 31–19. **Drive: 13 plays, 75 yards, 4:04.**
- ATL – Devonta Freeman 5-yard run (Matt Bryant kick), 2:07. Falcons 38–19. **Drive: 6 plays, 46 yards, 2:37.**

**Top passers**

- ARI – Carson Palmer – 25/45, 289 yards, 2 TD, INT
- ATL – Matt Ryan – 26/34, 269 yards, 2 TD, INT

**Top rushers**

- ARI – David Johnson – 13 rushes, 58 yards
- ATL – Devonta Freeman – 16 rushes, 60 yards, 2 TD

**Top receivers**

- ARI – David Johnson – 8 receptions, 103 yards, TD
- ATL – Taylor Gabriel – 4 receptions, 75 yards, 2 TD

==== Week 13: vs. Washington Redskins ====
Week Thirteen: Washington Redskins at Arizona Cardinals – Game summary

Quarter	1	2	3	4	Total
Redskins	0	6	14	3	**23**
**Cardinals**	7	3	7	14	**31**

at University of Phoenix Stadium, Glendale, Arizona

- Date: December 4
- Game time: 2:25 pm. MST
- Game weather: 68 °F (20 °C), sunny - retractable roof open
- Game attendance: 64,939
- Referee: Walt Anderson
- TV announcers (Fox): Dick Stockton, Chris Spielman and Kristina Pink
- Recap, Gamebook

Game information

**First quarter**

- ARI – David Johnson 1-yard run (Chandler Catanzaro kick), 6:43. Cardinals 7–0. **Drive: 15 plays, 75 yards, 8:17.**

**Second quarter**

- WAS – Dustin Hopkins 47-yard field goal, 9:48. Cardinals 7–3. **Drive: 7 plays, 40 yards, 3:33.**
- WAS – Dustin Hopkins 20-yard field goal, 1:52. Cardinals 7–6. **Drive: 11 plays, 47 yards, 5:26.**
- ARI – Chandler Catanzaro 28-yard field goal, 0:07. Cardinals 10–6. **Drive: 12 plays, 65 yards, 1:45.**

**Third quarter**

- WAS – Kirk Cousins 1-yard run (Dustin Hopkins kick), 12:36. Redskins 13–10. **Drive: 5 plays, 74 yards, 2:24.**
- ARI – Michael Floyd 6-yard pass from Carson Palmer (Chandler Catanzaro kick), 4:10. Cardinals 17–13. **Drive: 3 plays, 10 yards, 0:51.**
- WAS – Jamison Crowder 26-yard pass from Kirk Cousins (Dustin Hopkins kick), 1:06. Redskins 20–17. **Drive: 8 plays, 75 yards, 3:04.**

**Fourth quarter**

- ARI – David Johnson 25-yard pass from Carson Palmer (Chandler Catanzaro kick), 11:09. Cardinals 24–20. **Drive: 10 plays, 75 yards, 4:57.**
- WAS – Dustin Hopkins 53-yard field goal, 6:01. Cardinals 24–23. **Drive: 10 plays, 40 yards, 5:08.**
- ARI – J. J. Nelson 42-yard pass from Carson Palmer (Chandler Catanzaro kick), 1:56. Cardinals 31–23. **Drive: 8 plays, 75 yards, 4:05.**

**Top passers**

- WAS – Kirk Cousins – 21/37, 271 yards, TD, INT
- ARI – Carson Palmer – 30/46, 300 yards, 3 TD

**Top rushers**

- WAS – Robert Kelley – 14 rushes, 63 yards
- ARI – David Johnson – 18 rushes, 84 yards, TD

**Top receivers**

- WAS – Pierre Garçon – 7 receptions, 78 yards
- ARI – David Johnson – 9 receptions, 91 yards, TD

==== Week 14: at Miami Dolphins ====
Week Fourteen: Arizona Cardinals at Miami Dolphins – Game summary

Quarter	1	2	3	4	Total
Cardinals	6	3	0	14	**23**
**Dolphins**	7	7	7	5	**26**

at Hard Rock Stadium, Miami Gardens, Florida

- Date: December 11
- Game time: 11:00 am. MST
- Game weather: 77 °F (25 °C), cloudy
- Game attendance: 65,750
- Referee: Jerome Boger
- TV announcers (Fox): Chris Myers, Ronde Barber and Jennifer Hale
- Recap, Gamebook

Game information

**First quarter**

- MIA – Kenny Stills 28-yard pass from Ryan Tannehill (Andrew Franks kick), 9:27. Dolphins 7–0. **Drive: 4 plays, 52 yards, 2:09.**
- ARI – J. J. Nelson 56-yard run (kick failed, wide left), 8:00. Dolphins 7–6. **Drive: 3 plays, 75 yards, 1:27.**

**Second quarter**

- MIA – Dion Sims 7-yard pass from Ryan Tannehill (Andrew Franks kick), 11:41. Dolphins 14–6. **Drive: 5 plays, 43 yards, 2:55.**
- ARI – Chandler Catanzaro 56-yard field goal, 1:18. Dolphins 14–9. **Drive: 4 plays, 0 yards, 0:21.**

**Third quarter**

- MIA – Damien Williams 3-yard pass from Ryan Tannehill (Andrew Franks kick), 11:17. Dolphins 21–9. **Drive: 6 plays, 77 yards, 3:43.**

**Fourth quarter**

- ARI – Brittan Golden 9-yard pass from Carson Palmer, 7:05. Dolphins 21–15. **Drive: 12 plays, 99 yards, 6:43.**
- MIA – Walt Aikens defensive two-point conversion, 7:05. Dolphins 23–15.
- ARI – J. J. Nelson 8-yard pass from Carson Palmer (Carson Palmer–David Johnson pass), 3:01. Tied 23–23. **Drive: 7 plays, 50 yards, 2:13.**
- MIA – Andrew Franks 21-yard field goal, 0:00. Dolphins 26–23. **Drive: 6 plays, 44 yards, 1:29.**

**Top passers**

- ARI – Carson Palmer – 18/33, 145 yards, 2 TD, 2 INT
- MIA – Ryan Tannehill – 15/20, 195 yards, 3 TD, INT

**Top rushers**

- ARI – David Johnson – 20 rushes, 80 yards
- MIA – Jay Ajayi – 20 rushes, 48 yards

**Top receivers**

- ARI – Jermaine Gresham – 5 receptions, 45 yards
- MIA – Jarvis Landry – 4 receptions, 103 yards

This was the Cardinals' first loss to the Dolphins since 1999.

==== Week 15: vs. New Orleans Saints ====
Week Fifteen: New Orleans Saints at Arizona Cardinals – Game summary

Quarter	1	2	3	4	Total
**Saints**	10	14	3	21	**48**
Cardinals	7	13	7	14	**41**

at University of Phoenix Stadium, Glendale, Arizona

- Date: December 18
- Game time: 2:05 pm. MST
- Game weather: 62 °F (17 °C), sunny - retractable roof open
- Game attendance: 65,072
- Referee: Carl Cheffers
- TV announcers (Fox): Chris Myers, Ronde Barber and Jennifer Hale
- Recap, Gamebook

Game information

**First quarter**

- ARI – Kerwynn Williams 49-yard run (Chandler Catanzaro kick), 12:27. Cardinals 7–0. **Drive: 6 plays, 78 yards, 2:33.**
- NO – Wil Lutz 37-yard field goal, 5:27. Cardinals 7–3. **Drive: 14 plays, 56 yards, 7:00.**
- NO – Travaris Cadet 10-yard pass from Drew Brees (Wil Lutz kick), 1:33. Saints 10–7. **Drive: 7 plays, 30 yards, 2:59.**

**Second quarter**

- ARI – Calais Campbell 53-yard fumble return (kick failed, wide left), 7:08. Cardinals 13–10.
- NO – Brandin Cooks 65-yard pass from Drew Brees (Wil Lutz kick), 6:11. Saints 17–13. **Drive: 2 plays, 77 yards, 0:57.**
- NO – Brandin Cooks 45-yard pass from Drew Brees (Wil Lutz kick), 1:51. Saints 24–13. **Drive: 5 plays, 62 yards, 1:41.**
- ARI – J. J. Nelson 10-yard pass from Carson Palmer (Chandler Catanzaro kick), 0:40. Saints 24–20. **Drive: 8 plays, 80 yards, 1:11.**

**Third quarter**

- NO – Wil Lutz 39-yard field goal, 6:06. Saints 27–20. **Drive: 14 plays, 68 yards, 5:57.**
- ARI – David Johnson 2-yard run (Chandler Catanzaro kick), 3:19. Tied 27–27. **Drive: 5 plays, 62 yards, 2:47.**

**Fourth quarter**

- NO – Tim Hightower 3-yard run (Wil Lutz kick), 12:59. Saints 34–27. **Drive: 10 plays, 75 yards, 5:20.**
- ARI – David Johnson 7-yard run (Chandler Catanzaro kick), 8:57. Tied 34–34. **Drive: 7 plays, 75 yards, 4:02.**
- NO – Michael Thomas 4-yard pass from Drew Brees (Wil Lutz kick), 5:33. Saints 41–34. **Drive: 7 plays, 75 yards, 3:24.**
- NO – Tim Hightower 2-yard run (Wil Lutz kick), 3:27. Saints 48–34. **Drive: 6 plays, 29 yards, 1:46.**
- ARI – John Brown 30-yard pass from Carson Palmer (Chandler Catanzaro kick), 2:19. Saints 48–41. **Drive: 7 plays, 75 yards, 1:08.**

**Top passers**

- NO – Drew Brees – 37/48, 389 yards, 4 TD
- ARI – Carson Palmer – 28/40, 318 yards, 2 TD

**Top rushers**

- NO – Mark Ingram II – 17 rushes, 78 yards
- ARI – Kerwynn Williams – 3 rushes, 63 yards, TD

**Top receivers**

- NO – Brandin Cooks – 7 receptions, 186 yards, 2 TD
- ARI – John Brown – 5 receptions, 81 yards, TD

With the close loss, the Cardinals were eliminated from the playoffs for the first time since 2013.

==== Week 16: at Seattle Seahawks ====
Week Sixteen: Arizona Cardinals at Seattle Seahawks – Game summary

Quarter	1	2	3	4	Total
**Cardinals**	7	7	0	20	**34**
Seahawks	0	3	7	21	**31**

at CenturyLink Field, Seattle, Washington

- Date: December 24
- Game time: 2:25 pm. MST
- Game weather: 39 °F (4 °C), partly cloudy
- Game attendance: 69,050
- Referee: Ronald Torbert
- TV announcers (Fox): Kevin Burkhardt, John Lynch and Pam Oliver
- Recap, Gamebook

Game information

**First quarter**

- ARI – David Johnson 2-yard run (Chandler Catanzaro kick), 7:52. Cardinals 7–0. **Drive: 5 plays, 23 yards, 2:54.**

**Second quarter**

- ARI – J. J. Nelson 80-yard pass from Carson Palmer (Chandler Catanzaro kick), 3:53. Cardinals 14–0. **Drive: 3 plays, 91 yards, 1:30.**
- SEA – Steven Hauschka 27-yard field goal, 0:15. Cardinals 14–3. **Drive: 4 plays, 0 yards, 0:17.**

**Third quarter**

- SEA – Jermaine Kearse 2-yard pass from Russell Wilson (Steven Hauschka kick), 8:20. Cardinals 14–10. **Drive: 13 plays, 66 yards, 6:40.**

**Fourth quarter**

- ARI – David Johnson 1-yard run (Chandler Catanzaro kick), 13:32. Cardinals 21–10. **Drive: 9 plays, 61 yards, 4:59.**
- SEA – Doug Baldwin 42-yard pass from Russell Wilson (Russell Wilson–Marcel Reece pass), 8:49. Cardinals 21–18. **Drive: 9 plays, 75 yards, 4:43.**
- ARI – David Johnson 1-yard run (Chandler Catanzaro kick), 6:47. Cardinals 28–18. **Drive: 4 plays, 75 yards, 2:02.**
- ARI – Chandler Catanzaro 42-yard field goal, 4:10. Cardinals 31–18. **Drive: 4 plays, 6 yards, 0:59.**
- SEA – Jimmy Graham 37-yard pass from Russell Wilson (Steven Hauschka kick), 2:48. Cardinals 31–25. **Drive: 6 plays, 75 yards, 1:22.**
- SEA – Paul Richardson 5-yard pass from Russell Wilson (kick failed, wide left), 1:00. Tied 31–31. **Drive: 6 plays, 45 yards, 1:22.**
- ARI – Chandler Catanzaro 43-yard field goal, 0:00. Cardinals 34–31. **Drive: 8 plays, 50 yards, 1:00.**

**Top passers**

- ARI – Carson Palmer – 16/26, 284 yards, TD
- SEA – Russell Wilson – 29/45, 350 yards, 4 TD

**Top rushers**

- ARI – David Johnson – 28 rushes, 95 yards, 3 TD
- SEA – Russell Wilson – 10 rushes, 36 yards

**Top receivers**

- ARI – J. J. Nelson – 3 receptions, 132 yards, TD
- SEA – Doug Baldwin – 13 receptions, 171 yards, TD

==== Week 17: at Los Angeles Rams ====
Week Seventeen: Arizona Cardinals at Los Angeles Rams – Game summary

Quarter	1	2	3	4	Total
**Cardinals**	3	13	14	14	**44**
Rams	0	6	0	0	**6**

at Los Angeles Memorial Coliseum, Los Angeles, California

- Date: January 1, 2017
- Game time: 2:25 pm. MST
- Game weather: 59 °F (15 °C), sunny
- Game attendance: 80,729
- Referee: Craig Wrolstad
- TV announcers (Fox): Chris Myers, Ronde Barber and Jennifer Hale
- Recap, Gamebook

Game information

**First quarter**

- ARI – Chandler Catanzaro 32-yard field goal, 10:34. Cardinals 3–0. **Drive: 10 plays, 61 yards, 4:26.**

**Second quarter**

- ARI – Chandler Catanzaro 34-yard field goal, 12:25. Cardinals 6–0. **Drive: 6 plays, 19 yards, 2:07.**
- ARI – Jeremy Ross 4-yard pass from Carson Palmer (Chandler Catanzaro kick), 7:42. Cardinals 13–0. **Drive: 7 plays, 65 yards, 3:13.**
- LA – Greg Zuerlein 37-yard field goal, 2:34. Cardinals 13–3. **Drive: 9 plays, 56 yards, 5:08.**
- LA – Greg Zuerlein 36-yard field goal, 0:48. Cardinals 13–6. **Drive: 4 plays, 1 yard, 1:11.**
- ARI – Chandler Catanzaro 47-yard field goal, 0:00. Cardinals 16–6. **Drive: 7 plays, 46 yards, 0:48.**

**Third quarter**

- ARI – Darren Fells 37-yard pass from Carson Palmer (Chandler Catanzaro kick), 13:11. Cardinals 23–6. **Drive: 1 play, 37 yards, 0:09.**
- ARI – Kerwynn Williams 1-yard run (Chandler Catanzaro kick), 8:17. Cardinals 30–6. **Drive: 8 plays, 57 yards, 3:27.**

**Fourth quarter**

- ARI – Larry Fitzgerald 5-yard pass from Carson Palmer (Chandler Catanzaro kick), 11:35. Cardinals 37–6. **Drive: 6 plays, 19 yards, 1:48.**
- ARI – Justin Bethel 66-yard interception return (Chandler Catanzaro kick), 8:06. Cardinals 44–6.

**Top passers**

- ARI – Carson Palmer – 20/38, 255 yards, 3 TD, INT
- LA – Jared Goff – 13/20, 120 yards

**Top rushers**

- ARI – Kerwynn Williams – 12 rushes, 60 yards, TD
- LA – Todd Gurley – 14 rushes, 40 yards

**Top receivers**

- ARI – J. J. Nelson – 4 receptions, 75 yards
- LA – Todd Gurley – 4 receptions, 37 yards

Despite losing running back David Johnson to a knee injury in the first quarter, Arizona still managed to blow out the Rams, 44-6 to finish the year at 7-8-1.

== Standings ==
=== Division ===
NFC West
	W	L	T	PCT	DIV	CONF	PF	PA	STK
^{(3)} Seattle Seahawks	10	5	1	.656	3–2–1	6–5–1	354	292	W1
Arizona Cardinals	7	8	1	.469	4–1–1	6–5–1	418	362	W2
Los Angeles Rams	4	12	0	.250	2–4	3–9	224	394	L7
San Francisco 49ers	2	14	0	.125	2–4	2–10	309	480	L1

=== Conference ===
NFC
#	Team	Division	W	L	T	PCT	DIV	CONF	SOS	SOV	STK
Division leaders
1	Dallas Cowboys	East	13	3	0	.813	3–3	9–3	.471	.440	L1
2	Atlanta Falcons	South	11	5	0	.688	5–1	9–3	.480	.452	W4
3	Seattle Seahawks	West	10	5	1	.656	3–2–1	6–5–1	.441	.425	W1
4	Green Bay Packers	North	10	6	0	.625	5–1	8–4	.508	.453	W6
Wild Cards
5	New York Giants	East	11	5	0	.688	4–2	8–4	.486	.455	W1
6 (Note: Detroit finished ahead of Tampa Bay for the No. 6 seed and qualified for the last playoff spot based on record vs. common opponents—Detroit's cumulative record against Chicago, Dallas, Los Angeles and New Orleans was 3–2, while Tampa Bay's cumulative record against the same four teams was 2–3.)	Detroit Lions	North	9	7	0	.563	3–3	7–5	.475	.392	L3
Did not qualify for the postseason
7	Tampa Bay Buccaneers	South	9	7	0	.563	4–2	7–5	.492	.434	W1
8	Washington Redskins	East	8	7	1	.531	3–3	6–6	.516	.430	L1
9	Minnesota Vikings	North	8	8	0	.500	2–4	5–7	.492	.457	W1
10	Arizona Cardinals	West	7	8	1	.469	4–1–1	6–5–1	.463	.366	W2
11 (Note: New Orleans finished ahead of Philadelphia based on better record vs. conference opponents.)	New Orleans Saints	South	7	9	0	.438	2–4	6–6	.523	.393	L1
12	Philadelphia Eagles	East	7	9	0	.438	2–4	5–7	.559	.518	W2
13	Carolina Panthers	South	6	10	0	.375	1–5	5–7	.518	.354	L2
14	Los Angeles Rams	West	4	12	0	.250	2–4	3–9	.504	.500	L7
15	Chicago Bears	North	3	13	0	.188	2–4	3–9	.521	.396	L4
16	San Francisco 49ers	West	2	14	0	.125	2–4	2–10	.504	.250	L1
Tiebreakers (Note: When breaking ties for three or more teams under the NFL's rules, they are first broken within divisions, then comparing only the highest-ranked remaining team from each division.)

== Statistics ==
=== Starters ===
Offense

Pos.	Name	GS
QB	Carson Palmer; Drew Stanton	15; 1
RB	David Johnson	16
WR1	Larry Fitzgerald	16
WR2	Michael Floyd; John Brown	13; 3
TE	Darren Fells; Jermaine Gresham	14; 2
TE	Jermaine Gresham; Hakeem Valles; Ifeanyi Momah	14; 1; 1
LT	Jared Veldheer; John Wetzel; D.J. Humphries	8; 5; 3
LG	Mike Iupati; John Wetzel	15; 1
C	A.Q. Shipley	16
RG	Evan Mathis; Earl Watford; John Wetzel; Taylor Boggs; Evan Boehm	4; 7; 2; 2; 1
RT	D.J. Humphries; Ulrick John; Earl Watford	10; 3; 3

Defense

Pos.	Name	GS
DE	Calais Campbell	16
NT	Corey Peters; Xavier Williams	15; 1
DE	Frostee Rucker; Josh Mauro	13; 3
OLB	Chandler Jones	16
LB	Deone Bucannon; Sio Moore	13; 3
LB	Kevin Minter	16
OLB	Markus Golden	16
CB	Patrick Peterson	16
SS	Tony Jefferson; Harlan Miller	14; 2
FS	Tyrann Mathieu; D.J. Swearinger	10; 6
CB	Marcus Cooper; Brandon Williams	14; 2

Special Teams

Pos.	Name	GS
P	Drew Butler; Ryan Quigley; Matt Wile	7; 6; 3
K	Chandler Catanzaro	16
LS	Aaron Brewer; Kameron Canaday	13; 3

=== Individual leaders ===
Category	Player(s)	Value
Passing yards	Carson Palmer	4,233
Passing touchdowns	Carson Palmer	26
Rushing yards	David Johnson	1,239
Rushing touchdowns	David Johnson	16
Receptions	Larry Fitzgerald	107
Receiving yards	Larry Fitzgerald	1,023
Receiving touchdowns	J.J. Nelson; Larry Fitzgerald	6
Kickoff return yards	Brittan Golden	266
Punt return yards	John Brown	119
Tackles	Tony Jefferson	96
Sacks	Markus Golden	12.5
Forced fumbles	Chandler Jones; Markus Golden	4
Interceptions	Marcus Cooper	4
Kicking - field goals	Chandler Catanzaro	21/28, 75.0%
Kicking - extra points	Chandler Catanzaro	43/47, 91.5%

=== Team rankings ===
Category	Value	NFL rank (out of 32)
Passing attempts	646	
Passing completions	383	3rd
Passing yards	4,136	9th
Passing touchdowns	28	11th
Interceptions thrown	17	26th
Rushing attempts	399	21st
Rushing yards	1,732	18th
Rushing touchdowns	20	3rd
Rushing yards/attempt	4.3	12th
Total yards of offense	5,868	9th
Points scored	418	6th
Points allowed	362	14th
Passing yards allowed	3,365	4th
Passing touchdowns allowed	21	8th
Rushing attempts against	424	20th
Rushing yards allowed	1,518	9th
Rushing touchdowns allowed	16	22nd
Yards/rush attempt allowed	3.6	3rd
Interceptions made	14	12th
Fumbles recovered	14	2nd
Total yards allowed	4,883	2nd

Statistics correct as of the end of the 2016 NFL season
