= Tony Jefferson =

American football player (born 1992)

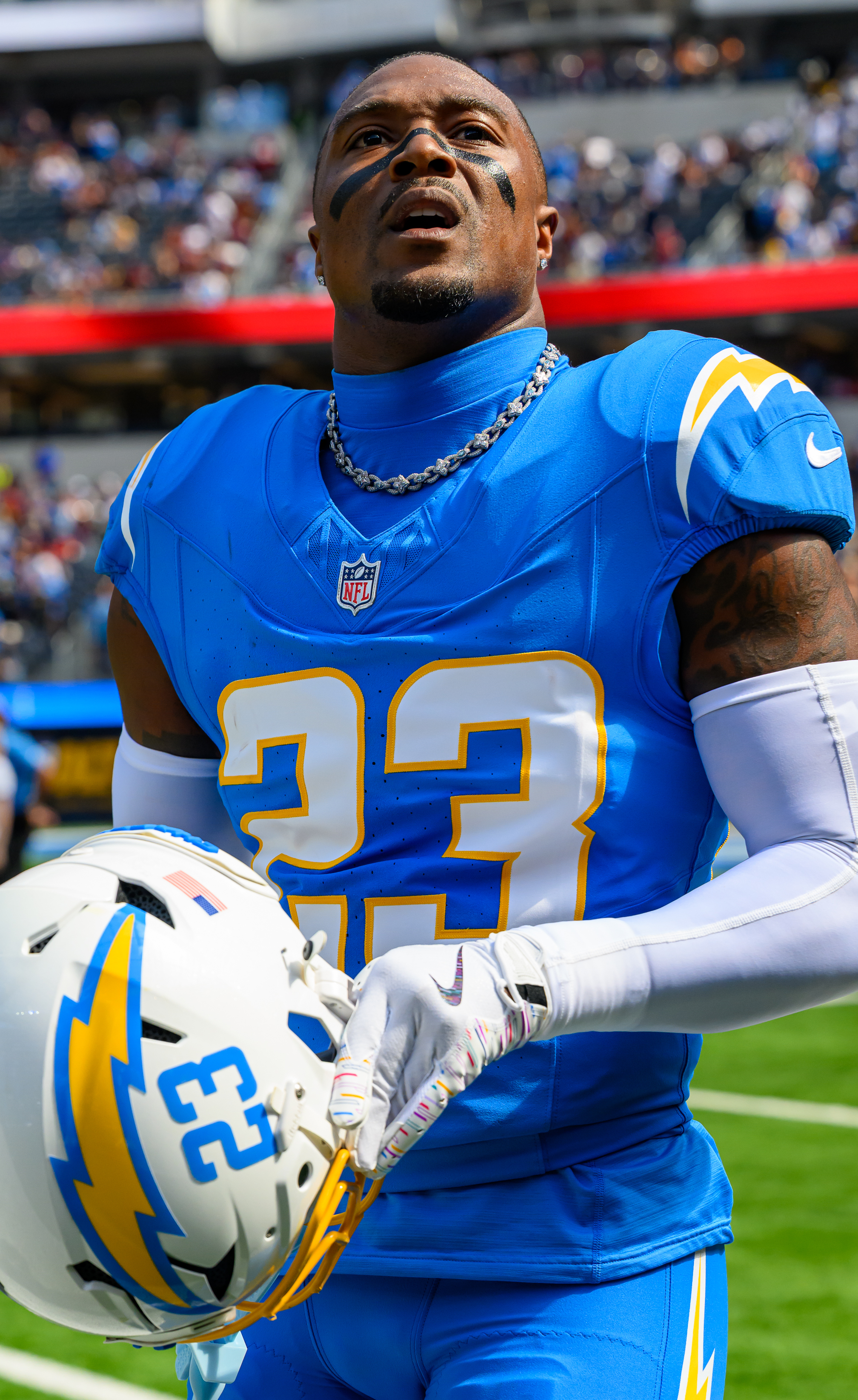
- Jefferson with the Los Angeles Chargers in 2025

No. 23 – Los Angeles Chargers
- Position: Safety
- Roster status: Active

Personal information
- Born: January 27, 1992 (age 34); San Diego, California, U.S.
- Listed height: 5 ft 11 in (1.80 m)
- Listed weight: 212 lb (96 kg)

Career information
- High school: Eastlake (Chula Vista, California)
- College: Oklahoma (2010–2012)
- NFL draft: 2013: undrafted

Career history

Playing
- Arizona Cardinals (2013–2016); Baltimore Ravens (2017–2019); San Francisco 49ers (2021); Baltimore Ravens (2021); New York Giants (2022); Los Angeles Chargers (2024–present)

Operations
- Baltimore Ravens (2023) Scouting intern

Awards and highlights
- Freshman All-American (2010); First-team All-Big 12 (2012); Big 12 co-Defensive Freshman of the Year (2010)

Career NFL statistics as of Week 5, 2026
- Total tackles: 595
- Sacks: 9.5
- Forced fumbles: 8
- Fumble recoveries: 5
- Pass deflections: 33
- Interceptions: 8
- Defensive touchdowns: 1
- Stats at Pro Football Reference

Tony Lemar Jefferson Jr. (born January 27, 1992) is an American professional football safety for the Los Angeles Chargers of the National Football League (NFL). He played college football for the Oklahoma Sooners and signed with the Arizona Cardinals as an undrafted free agent in 2013. He has previously played in the NFL for the Cardinals, Baltimore Ravens, San Francisco 49ers, and New York Giants.

== Early life ==
Jefferson attended Eastlake High School in Chula Vista, California, where he made 88 tackles, 12 tackles for loss, four sacks, two fumbles caused, two fumbles recovered, and lead Eastlake to a San Diego Division 1 CIF championship during his senior year. He earned a 2009 USA Today All-American selection. Regarded as a four-star recruit by Rivals.com, Jefferson was listed as the No. 4 cornerback prospect in the class of 2010. He played in the 2010 U.S. Army All-American Bowl. He is of Mexican descent through his mother.

== College career ==
At the University of Oklahoma, Jefferson was a 2010 Freshman All-American by College Football News, The Sporting News, and Big 12 Conference co-Defensive Freshman of the Year (along with OSU Cowboys linebacker Shaun Lewis).

== Professional career ==
=== Pre-draft ===
On January 6, 2013, it was announced that Jefferson would forgo his senior season and enter the 2013 NFL Draft. Prior to the NFL Combine, Jefferson was ranked the fifth best safety prospect in the draft by ESPN. He was one of 21 safeties to attend the NFL Scouting Combine in Indianapolis, Indiana. At the combine, he completed the majority of drills before sustaining a hamstring injury that significantly affected his ability to run. His 40-yard dash was the second slowest time among all 18 safeties that participated. On March 18, 2013, Jefferson attended Oklahoma's pro day, but only performed the short shuttle and three-cone drill due to his hamstring injury. His character came into question after WalterFootball.com released a scouting report stating it received information from reliable sources that he had practice habits and an attitude, but was quickly dismissed after teammates and coaching staff at Oklahoma refuted the claims. The website later retracted the claims. He was projected to be drafted as early as the second or third round or as late as the fifth round by NFL Draft experts and scouts. Jefferson was ranked the eighth best safety in the draft by DraftScout.com and SB Nation.

External videos
- Jefferson's NFL Combine workout

Pre-draft measurables
Height	Weight	Arm length	Hand span	Wingspan	40-yard dash	10-yard split	20-yard split	20-yard shuttle	Three-cone drill	Bench press
5 ft 10 3/4 in (1.80 m)	213 lb (97 kg)	31 5/8 in (0.80 m)	9 1/4 in (0.23 m)	6 ft 3 5/8 in (1.92 m)	4.75 s	1.67 s	2.77 s	4.21 s	7.27 s	16 reps
All values from NFL Combine/Oklahoma's Pro Day

=== Arizona Cardinals ===
==== 2013 ====
On April 28, 2013, the Arizona Cardinals signed Jefferson to a three-year, $1.49 million contract that includes a signing bonus of $10,100 after he went undrafted in the 2013 NFL draft. His fall in the draft surprised analysts and was attributed to his time in the 40-yard dash and questions about his work ethic.

Throughout training camp, Jefferson competed for a roster spot as a backup safety against Jonathon Amaya, Curtis Taylor, Javon Harris, and Josh Hill.

On August 17, 2013, Jefferson recorded five combined tackles and intercepted two passes by Alex Tanney and Kyle Orton during a 12–7 victory against the Dallas Cowboys in their second preseason game. Head coach Bruce Arians named Jefferson the backup strong safety, behind Yeremiah Bell, to begin the regular season after he performed well in the preseason and recorded 14 combined tackles (13 solo), two interceptions, and a sack.

He made his professional regular season debut in the Arizona Cardinals' season-opening 27–24 loss at the St. Louis Rams. The following week, Jefferson earned his first career start and made three solo tackles during a 25–22 victory against the Detroit Lions in Week 2. He made his first career tackle on running back Reggie Bush, stopping him for a four-yard loss in the first quarter. On September 29, 2013, Jefferson collected a season-high seven combined tackles during 13–10 victory at the Tampa Bay Buccaneers. His snaps increased for the last three games of the season (Weeks 15–17) after Tyrann Mathieu tore two ligaments in his knee and was sidelined for the rest of the season. In Week 16, he earned his second career start, replacing free safety Rashad Johnson, who was inactive due to an injury he suffered the previous week. Jefferson finished the Cardinals' 17–10 victory at the Seattle Seahawks with four combined tackles. He finished his rookie season in 2013 with 24 combined tackles (19 solo) and a fumble recovery in 16 games and two starts.

==== 2014 ====
During OTA's and training camp, Jefferson competed against Rashad Johnson and rookie first round pick Deone Bucannon for the job as the starting strong safety. Defensive coordinator Todd Bowles named Jefferson the starting strong safety to start the regular season, alongside free safety Tyrann Mathieu. Rashad Johnson later replaced Mathieu as the starting free safety to start the season due to a slow recovery process for Mathieu's knee injury.

In Week 3, Jefferson made ten combined tackles (eight solo) and his first career sack on quarterback Colin Kaepernick during a 23–14 victory against the San Francisco 49ers. On October 26, 2014, he collected a season-high 12 combined tackles (11 solo) and broke up a pass in the Cardinals' 24–20 victory against the Philadelphia Eagles. Jefferson was replaced as the starting free safety prior to Week 10, after Tyrann Mathieu fully recovered from his knee injury. He remained the backup free safety for four games (Weeks 10–13). In Week 13, Mathieu sustained a broken thumb during a 29–18 loss at the Atlanta Falcons. Jefferson filled in at starting free safety for three games (Weeks 14–16) while Mathieu recovered from surgery to repair his broken thumb. On December 26, 2014, Jefferson recorded seven solo tackles as the Cardinals were routed 35–6 by the Seattle Seahawks in Week 16. Jefferson finished the 2014 season with 79 combined tackles (70 solo), a pass deflection, and a sack in 16 games and eight starts. Jefferson, Johnson, Mathieu, and Bucannon all shared time and rotated at both safety positions throughout 2014. Jefferson and Johnson were called upon to play in the Cardinals' base formations and received the majority of the snaps, while Bucannon was given duties that required the safety to play in the box. Mathieu was the designated safety for nickel packages. All four safeties were on the field for 70 defensive snaps.

The Arizona Cardinals finished second in the NFC West with an 11–5 record. On January 3, 2015, Jefferson started in his first career playoff game and made up seven combined tackles in the Cardinals' 27–16 loss to the Carolina Panthers in the NFC Wildcard Game.

==== 2015 ====
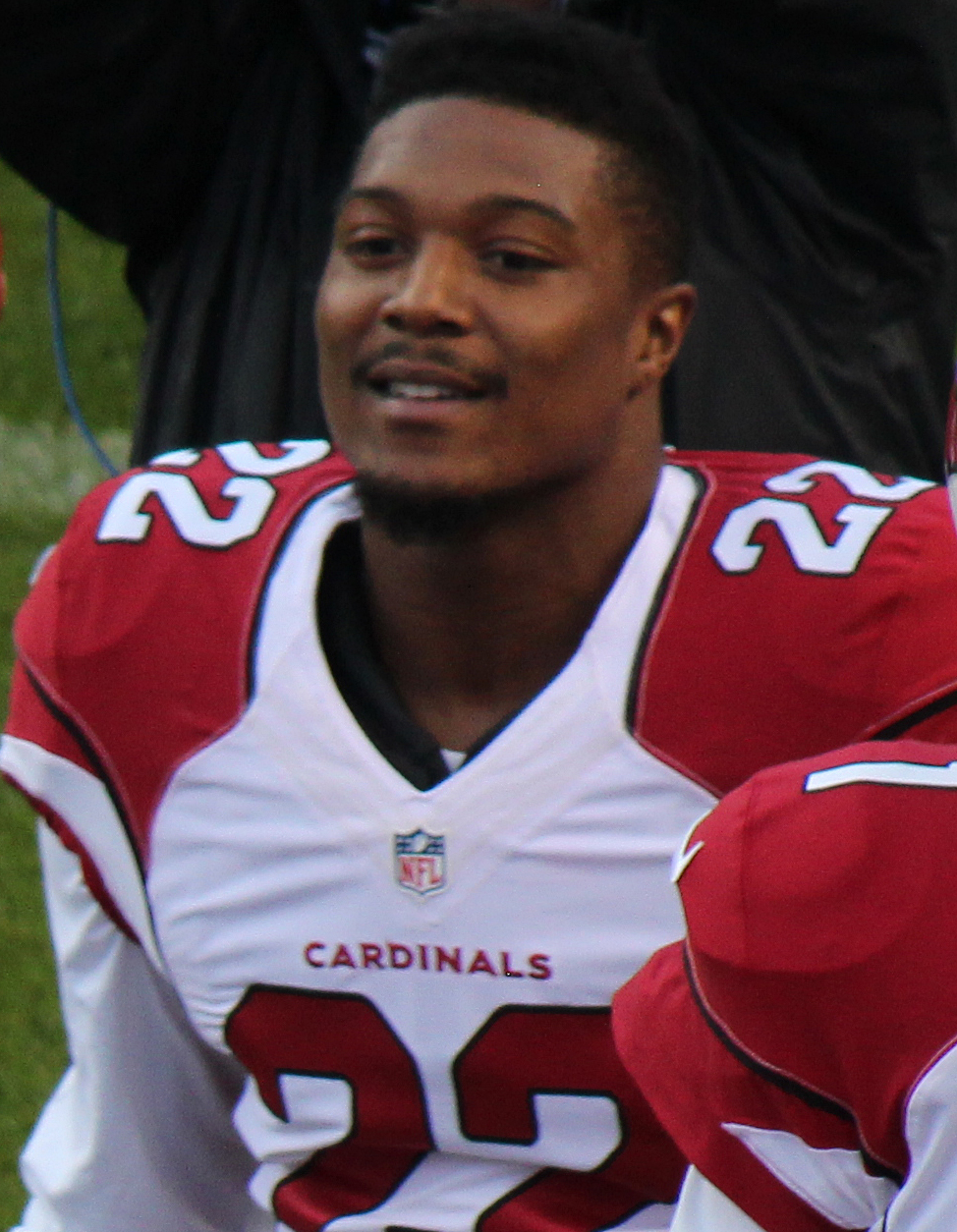
Jefferson with the Arizona Cardinals in 2015

Jefferson returned to training camp competing for the job as the starting strong safety against Deone Bucannon . Defensive coordinator James Bettcher named Jefferson the starting strong safety to start the 2015 season, opposite free safety Tyrann Mathieu.

On September 20, 2015, Jefferson recorded nine solo tackles, a pass deflection, and returned his first career interception off a pass by quarterback Jay Cutler for a 26-yard touchdown during a 48–23 victory at the Chicago Bears in Week 2. His interception came off a pass attended for Martellus Bennett in the second quarter and also marked his first career touchdown. In Week 5, he collected a season-high 12 combined tackles (eight solo), a pass deflection, and forced two fumbles in a 42–16 victory at the Detroit Lions. On November 29, 2015, Jefferson made six combined tackles and a sack on Blaine Gabbert during the Cardinals' 19–13 victory at the San Francisco 49ers. Jefferson finished his third season with 78 combined tackles (58 solo), five pass deflections, three forced fumbles, two sacks, two interceptions, and a touchdown in 16 games and seven starts. His 78 tackles were the fourth most on the team. Pro Football Focus gave Jefferson an overall grade of 81.3, ranking him 18th among all qualifying safeties in 2015.

The Arizona Cardinals finished first in the NFC West with a 13–3 record and received a first round bye. The Cardinals defeated the Green Bay Packers 26–20 in the NFC Divisional Round. On January 24, 2016, Jefferson started for the Cardinals in the NFC Championship and recorded 11 combined tackles (five solo) and a pass deflection in their 49–15 loss to the Carolina Panthers.

==== 2016 ====
On April 18, 2016, the Arizona Cardinals signed Jefferson to a one-year, $1.67 million tender with a right of first refusal clause.

Throughout training camp, he competed for the job as the starting strong safety against D.J. Swearinger. Head coach Bruce Arians named Jefferson the backup strong safety behind D.J. Swearinger to begin the regular season.

He started the Arizona Cardinals' season-opener against the New England Patriots and recorded ten combined tackles (nine solo) in their 23–21 loss. The following week, he collected a season-high 11 combined tackles (nine solo) in the Cardinals' 40–7 victory over the Tampa Bay Buccaneers in Week 2. On December 11, 2016, Jefferson recorded ten combined tackles (seven solo) during a 26–23 loss at the Miami Dolphins. In Week 16, he made seven solo tackles before exiting the Cardinals' 35–6 loss to the Seattle Seahawks in the second quarter after he sustained a knee injury while covering a punt. He was diagnosed with a sprained MCL and was placed on injured reserve on December 27, 2016. He finished his last season as part of the Cardinals with a career-high 96 combined tackles (78 solo), five pass deflections, two sacks, two fumble recoveries, and two forced fumbles in 15 games and 14 starts.

The Arizona Cardinals did not qualify for the playoffs in 2016 after finishing second in the NFC West with a 7–8–1 record. Pro Football Focus gave Jefferson an overall grade of 88.6, ranking him fifth among all qualifying safeties in 2016.

=== Baltimore Ravens (first stint) ===
==== 2017 ====
Jefferson became an unrestricted free agent after the 2016 season and was regarded as the second best free agent safety on the market behind Kansas City Chiefs' safety Eric Berry. He received interest from multiple teams including the Chicago Bears. It was reported that Jefferson received offers from the Cleveland Browns and New York Jets.

On March 9, 2017, the Baltimore Ravens signed Jefferson to a four-year, $34 million contract that includes $19 million guaranteed and a signing bonus of $10 million.

He entered training camp slated as the starting strong safety, replacing Lardarius Webb. Head coach John Harbaugh officially named him the starter to open the season, alongside free safety Eric Weddle. Jefferson started the Baltimore Ravens' season-opener against the Cincinnati Bengals and recorded nine combined tackles and a sack on quarterback Andy Dalton during their 20–0 victory. In Week 12, he recorded three combined tackles, deflected a pass, and intercepted a pass by Tom Savage in the Ravens' 23–16 victory against the Houston Texans. On December 10, 2017, Jefferson made a season-high 11 combined tackles (eight solo) and was credited with half a sack during a 39–38 loss at the Pittsburgh Steelers. Jefferson and teammate Terrell Suggs sacked Roethlisberger for a nine-yard loss the fourth quarter. He finished his first season with the Baltimore Ravens with 79 combined tackles (56 solo), 2.5 sacks, two pass deflections, and an interception in 16 games and 16 starts. Pro Football Focus gave Jefferson an overall grade of 82.4, which ranked 24th among all qualifying safeties in 2017.

==== 2018 ====
Jefferson returned as the Ravens starting strong safety in 2018. He started 14 games, recording 74 combined tackles, a forced fumble, an interception, and a career-high six pass deflections.

==== 2019 ====
On October 6, 2019, in a game against the Steelers, Jefferson was in coverage when he fell to the ground, grabbing his knee. It was revealed after the game that he tore his ACL, ultimately ending his season. The Ravens did go on to win the game 26–23 in OT. The following day, Jefferson was put on season-ending injured reserve.

On February 14, 2020, Jefferson was released by the Ravens.

=== San Francisco 49ers ===
After spending the 2020 season out of football, Jefferson was signed a one-year, $1 million contract with the San Francisco 49ers on June 7, 2021. However, he was placed on injured reserve on August 12, and later released on August 23. Jefferson was re-signed to the practice squad on October 25. He was released on December 8, after appearing in two games.

=== Baltimore Ravens (second stint) ===
On December 13, 2021, Jefferson was re-signed to the Ravens' practice squad. On January 8, 2022, Jefferson was promoted to the active roster.

On February 24, 2022, Jefferson re-signed with the Ravens. On August 30, Jefferson was released by the Ravens.

=== New York Giants ===
On September 1, 2022, Jefferson signed with the New York Giants practice squad. Jefferson was elevated from the practice squad for Week 1 and Week 2 games against the Tennessee Titans and Carolina Panthers. On October 8, he was promoted to the active roster. On October 15, Jefferson was placed on injured reserve with a foot injury. On December 3, Jefferson was activated from injured reserve. Jefferson finished the season with 24 tackles.

=== Retirement ===
On May 25, 2023, Jefferson announced that he was retiring from professional football and would be re-joining the Baltimore Ravens organization in a scouting capacity.

On May 28, 2024, Jefferson announced that he was coming out of retirement and was seeking to play in the 2024 NFL season.

=== Los Angeles Chargers ===
On June 14, 2024, Jefferson signed with the Los Angeles Chargers. He was released on August 29, and re-signed to the practice squad. He was promoted to the active roster on September 26 and released four days later, and signed back to the practice squad. He was promoted back to the active roster a few weeks later.

On March 24, 2025, Jefferson re-signed with the Chargers on a one-year contract. He was released on August 26 as part of final roster cuts and re-signed to the practice squad the next day. On September 15, Jefferson was elevated to the active roster for the Chargers' Week 2 matchup against the Las Vegas Raiders. He was signed to the active roster on September 18. On December 8, in a game against the Philadelphia Eagles, Jefferson recorded a game-winning interception.

On March 18, 2026, Jefferson re-signed with the Chargers on a one-year, $2 million contract.

== Career statistics ==
=== NFL ===
Legend
**Bold**	Career high

==== Regular season ====
Year	Team	Games		Tackles					Interceptions						Fumbles		
Year	Team	GP	GS	Cmb	Solo	Ast	Sck	TFL	Int	Yds	Avg	Lng	TD	PD	FF	FR	TD
2013	ARI	**16**	2	24	19	5	0.0	1	0	0	0.0	0	0	0	0	1	0
2014	ARI	**16**	8	79	70	9	1.0	2	0	0	0.0	0	0	1	1	0	0
2015	ARI	**16**	7	78	58	20	2.0	4	2	**26**	13.0	**26**	**1**	5	**3**	0	0
2016	ARI	15	14	**96**	**78**	18	2.0	13	0	0	0.0	0	0	5	2	**2**	0
2017	BAL	**16**	**16**	79	56	**23**	**2.5**	7	1	13	13.0	13	0	2	1	0	0
2018	BAL	14	14	74	53	21	1.0	6	1	15	**15.0**	15	0	6	1	1	0
2019	BAL	5	5	21	11	10	0.0	0	0	0	0.0	0	0	3	0	0	0
2021	SF	2	0	1	0	1	0.0	0	0	0	0.0	0	0	0	0	0	0
2021	BAL	4	0	17	9	8	1.0	1	0	0	0.0	0	0	1	0	0	0
2022	NYG	9	1	23	16	7	0.0	0	0	0	0.0	0	0	1	0	0	0
2024	LAC	8	4	27	17	10	0.0	1	0	0	0.0	0	0	0	0	0	0
2025	LAC	13	8	57	37	20	0.0	1	**4**	5	1.3	3	0	**7**	0	0	0
2026	LAC	5	5	19	11	8	0.0	1	0	0	0.0	0	0	2	0	1	0
Career		139	84	595	435	160	9.5	37	8	59	7.4	26	1	33	8	5	0

==== Postseason ====
Year	Team	Games		Tackles					Interceptions						Fumbles		
Year	Team	GP	GS	Cmb	Solo	Ast	Sck	TFL	Int	Yds	Avg	Lng	TD	PD	FF	FR	TD
2014	ARI	1	1	7	3	4	0.0	0	0	0	0.0	0	0	0	0	0	0
2015	ARI	**2**	**2**	**20**	**13**	**7**	0.0	2	0	0	0.0	0	0	**2**	0	0	0
2018	BAL	1	1	8	5	3	0.0	1	0	0	0.0	0	0	0	0	0	0
2022	NYG	**2**	0	4	2	2	0.0	0	0	0	0.0	0	0	0	0	0	0
2024	LAC	1	1	3	2	1	0.0	2	0	0	0.0	0	0	0	**1**	**1**	0
2025	LAC	1	1	3	2	1	0.0	1	0	0	0.0	0	0	0	0	0	0
Career		8	6	45	27	18	0.0	6	0	0	0.0	0	0	2	1	1	0

=== College ===
Year	Team	Class	Pos	GP	Tackles					Interceptions				
Year	Team	Class	Pos	GP	Solo	Ast	Cmb	TfL	Sck	Int	Yds	Avg	TD	PD
2010	Oklahoma	FR	SS	14	44	21	65	7.0	2.0	2	22	11.0	1	0
2011	Oklahoma	SO	SS	13	52	22	74	7.5	4.5	4	6	1.5	0	0
2012	Oklahoma	JR	SS	13	85	34	119	3.5	0.5	2	14	7.0	0	0
Career				40	181	77	258	18.0	7.0	8	42	6.0	1	0
