= Josh Mauro =

American football player (1991–2026)

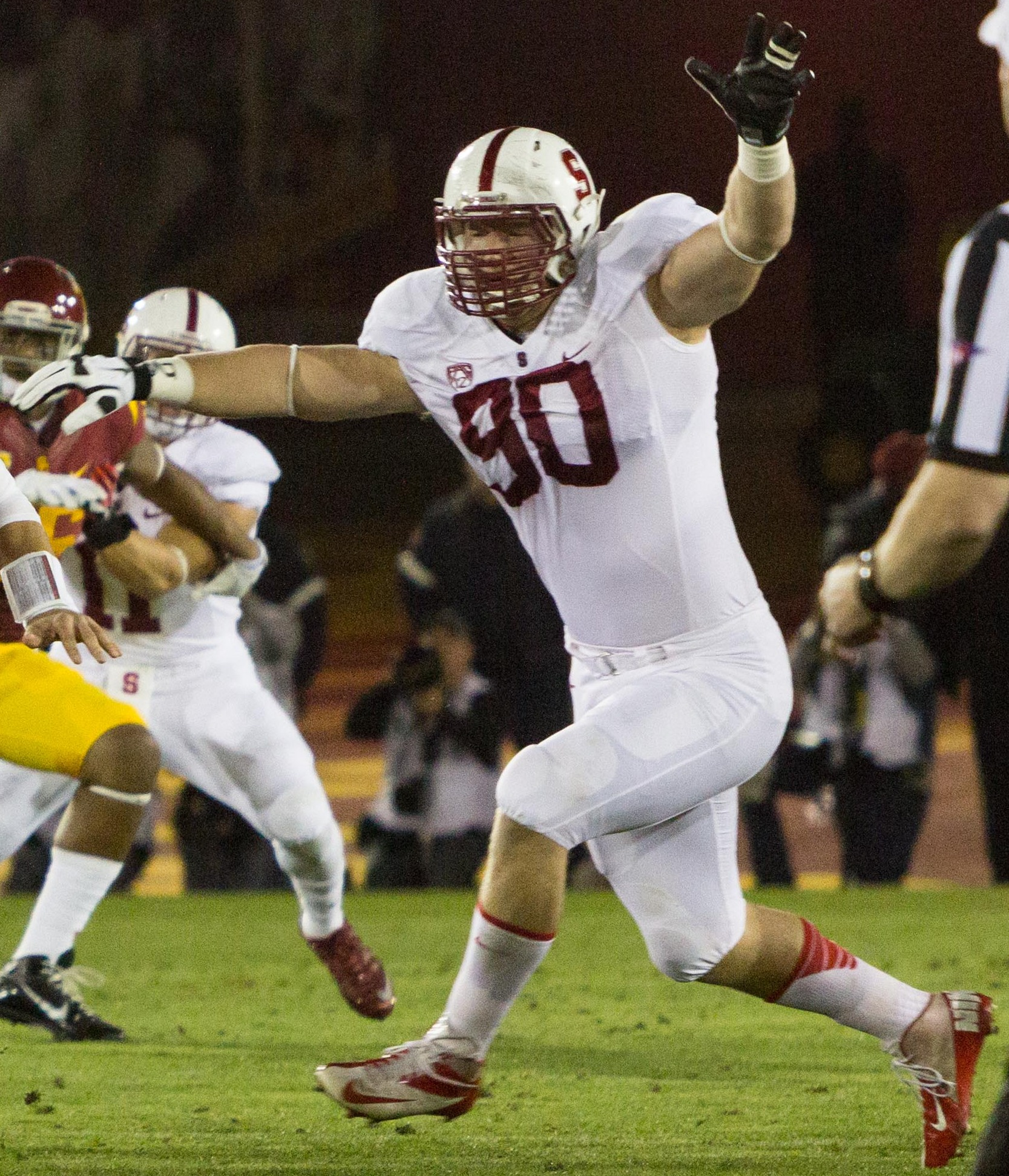
- Mauro with Stanford in 2013

No. 73, 97, 69, 96
- Position: Defensive end

Personal information
- Born: February 17, 1991; St Albans, England
- Died: April 23, 2026 (aged 35); Tempe, Arizona, U.S.
- Listed height: 6 ft 6 in (1.98 m)
- Listed weight: 290 lb (132 kg)

Career information
- High school: L. D. Bell (Hurst, Texas, U.S.)
- College: Stanford (2010–2013)
- NFL draft: 2014: undrafted

Career history
- Pittsburgh Steelers (2014)*; Arizona Cardinals (2014–2017); New York Giants (2018); Oakland Raiders (2019); Jacksonville Jaguars (2020); Arizona Cardinals (2020–2021)
- * Offseason or practice squad member only

Career NFL statistics
- Total tackles: 130
- Sacks: 5.0
- Forced fumbles: 2
- Fumble recoveries: 1
- Pass deflections: 5
- Stats at Pro Football Reference

Joshua Daniel Mauro (February 17, 1991 – April 23, 2026) was an American professional football player who was a defensive end in the National Football League (NFL) for the Arizona Cardinals, New York Giants, and Jacksonville Jaguars. He played college football for the Stanford Cardinal.

== Early life ==
Mauro was born in St Albans, England. His father, Greg, had been stationed for work in England. When Mauro was three, his family moved back to the United States, where he grew up in Texas.

He was named to the Dallas Morning News first-team all-area and Associated Press all-state team in high school. He was ranked as the nation's 31st-best weakside defensive end prospect by Rivals.com.

== College career ==
Mauro attended Stanford University. On October 9, 2013, he was named on the Bednarik Award watch list. On November 18, 2013, he was named on the Ted Hendricks Award midseason watch list. On December 2, 2013, he was an honorable mention for the All-Pac-12 team.

== Professional career ==
Pre-draft measurables
Height	Weight	Arm length	Hand span	Wingspan	40-yard dash	10-yard split	20-yard split	20-yard shuttle	Three-cone drill	Vertical jump	Broad jump	Bench press
6 ft 5 7/8 in (1.98 m)	271 lb (123 kg)	33 in (0.84 m)	9 1/2 in (0.24 m)	6 ft 4 1/2 in (1.94 m)	5.21 s	1.78 s	2.92 s	4.50 s	7.43 s	32 in (0.81 m)	9 ft 8 in (2.95 m)	29 reps
All values from NFL Combine/Pro Day

=== Pittsburgh Steelers ===
Mauro began his professional career by signing with the Pittsburgh Steelers as an undrafted free agent, but was released during the final roster cuts.

=== Arizona Cardinals (first stint) ===
After his release from the Steelers, Mauro signed with the Arizona Cardinals. During his rookie season in 2014, Mauro played 5 games with 6 tackles and a pass defended. In 2015, he played 14 games with 15 tackles, 1 sack, 1 pass defended, 2 forced fumbles, and 1 fumble recovery.

In 2016, Mauro started 13 of 15 games he played in recording a career-high 42 tackles and 13 tackles for loss. Set to be a restricted free agent in 2017, Mauro signed a two-year contract to remain with the Cardinals on January 12, 2017.

On March 16, 2018, Mauro was released by the Cardinals.

=== New York Giants ===
On March 19, 2018, Mauro signed with the New York Giants reuniting with his former defensive coordinator in Arizona, James Bettcher.

On March 23, 2018, Mauro was suspended without pay for the first four games of the 2018 regular season for violating the NFL policy on performance enhancing substances.

After being reinstated from his suspension, he recorded a tackle in the Giant's Week 5 loss to the Carolina Panthers. After the bye week and the trading of Damon Harrison, he was named the starting defensive end next to defensive tackle B. J. Hill and nose tackle Dalvin Tomlinson. In his first game as a starter for the Giants, a win against the San Francisco 49ers, he recorded 5 tackles. In a Week 11 win against the Tampa Bay Buccaneers, he recorded 4 tackles. Mauro would remain the starting 5-tech defensive end for the rest of the 2018 season and finished with 28 total tackles (17 solo and 11 assists), 1 sack, 4 tackles for a loss, and 1 QB hit.

=== Oakland / Las Vegas Raiders ===
On March 15, 2019, Mauro signed with the Oakland Raiders. He was released on September 1, 2019, but was re-signed a day later.

=== Jacksonville Jaguars ===
Mauro signed with the Jacksonville Jaguars on August 12, 2020. The NFL suspended him for the first five games of the 2020 NFL season for violating the league's performance-enhancing drugs policy on August 21, 2020. He was reinstated from suspension on October 12, and he was placed on the reserve/COVID-19 list by the team on October 17. He was activated from the list on October 22 and subsequently released by the Jaguars. He was re-signed to the practice squad two days later.

=== Arizona Cardinals (second stint) ===
On October 28, 2020, Mauro was signed by the Arizona Cardinals off the Jaguars practice squad. Mauro made his debut with the Cardinals in Week 9 against the Miami Dolphins. During the game, Mauro recorded his first sack of the season on Tua Tagovailoa during the 34–31 loss. He was placed on injured reserve on November 28, 2020. He was designated to return from injured reserve on December 16, and began practicing with the team again, but was waived on January 13, 2021.

On August 10, 2021, Mauro re-signed with the Cardinals. He was released on August 31, 2021. He was re-signed to the practice squad on October 19.

== Death ==
Mauro died on April 23, 2026, at the age of 35 from a drug overdose.
