= Cole Toner =

American football player (born 1994)

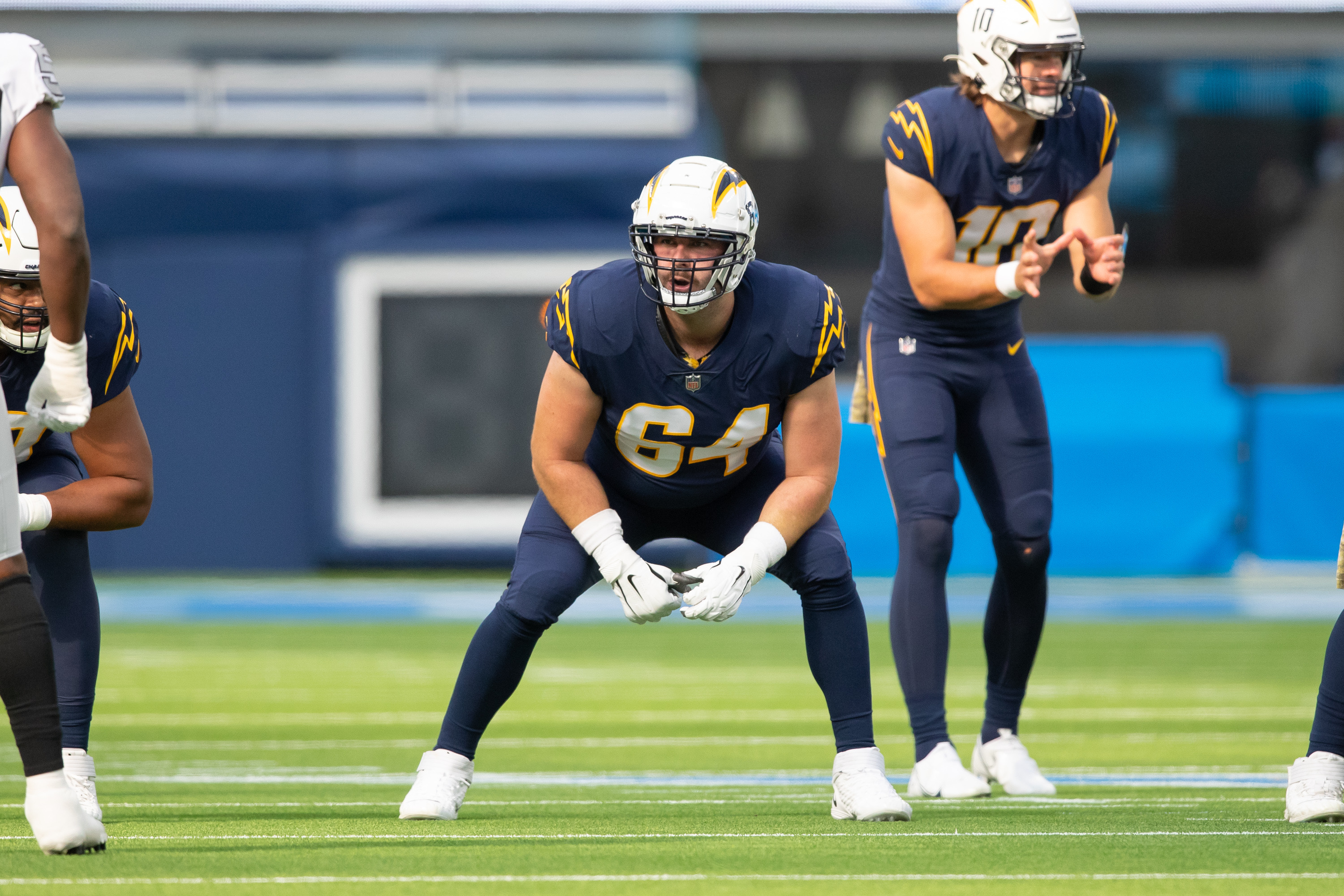
- Toner with the Los Angeles Chargers in 2020

No. 61, 64, 66
- Position: Center

Personal information
- Born: March 13, 1994 (age 32); Greenwood, Indiana, U.S.
- Listed height: 6 ft 5 in (1.96 m)
- Listed weight: 310 lb (141 kg)

Career information
- High school: Roncalli (Indianapolis, Indiana)
- College: Harvard
- NFL draft: 2016: 5th round, 170th overall pick

Career history
- Arizona Cardinals (2016); Cincinnati Bengals (2017)*; New England Patriots (2017)*; Los Angeles Chargers (2017–2020); Houston Texans (2021); Los Angeles Rams (2022)*
- * Offseason or practice squad member only

Career NFL statistics
- Games played: 14
- Games started: 4
- Stats at Pro Football Reference

Cole Toner (born March 13, 1994) is an American former professional football player who was a center in the National Football League (NFL). He played college football for the Harvard Crimson and was selected by the Arizona Cardinals in the fifth round of the 2016 NFL draft.

== College career ==
Toner started at right tackle for the Harvard Crimson for three and a half years and was a four-year varsity letterman. He was selected First-team All-Ivy League in 2014 and 2015. In 2015, he was selected to the Lindy's Preseason All-FootballChampionship Subdivision (FCS) first-team, the All-New England Team, the STATS FCS All-American first-team, and the Associated Press FCS All-American first-team. He was also named to the Fall 2015 Academic All-Ivy Team and was a semifinalist in the 2015 National Football Foundation William V. Campbell Trophy (the academic Heisman).

== Professional career ==
Pre-draft measurables
Height	Weight	Arm length	Hand span	40-yard dash	20-yard shuttle	Three-cone drill	Vertical jump	Broad jump	Bench press
6 ft 5 1/4 in (1.96 m)	306 lb (139 kg)	33 1/8 in (0.84 m)	9 3/4 in (0.25 m)	5.32 s	4.59 s	7.88 s	26.0 in (0.66 m)	8 ft 7 in (2.62 m)	22 reps
All values from NFL Combine.

=== The Arizona Cardinals ===
Toner was selected by the Arizona Cardinals in the fifth round (170th overall) in the 2016 NFL draft. On May 2, 2016, he signed a four-year contract with the Cardinals. On September 2, 2017, Toner was waived by the Cardinals.

=== Cincinnati Bengals ===
On September 4, 2017, Toner was signed to the practice squad of the Cincinnati Bengals. He was released on September 29.

=== New England Patriots ===
On October 9, 2017, Toner was signed to the New England Patriots' practice squad. He was placed on the practice squad injured reserve list on October 12 and released four days later on October 16.

=== Los Angeles Chargers ===
On November 7, 2017, Toner was signed to the Los Angeles Chargers' practice squad. He signed a reserve/future contract with the Chargers on January 1, 2018.

Toner only saw play in one game during the 2018 season, a Chargers' Week 1 loss to the Kansas City Chiefs. Although he stayed on the roster, he was inactive for the rest of the season.

On August 2, 2019, Toner was marked waived/injured by the Chargers and placed on injured reserve. He was waived with an injury settlement on August 7, but was re-signed to the practice squad on October 16. Toner signed another reserve/future contract with the Chargers on December 30.

On September 5, 2020, Toner was released by the Chargers and signed to the practice squad the next day. He was elevated to the active roster on October 3 for the team's Week 4 game against the Tampa Bay Buccaneers, but did not play and was reverted to the practice squad after the game. He was promoted back to the active roster on October 31. He went on to play in ten games that season, starting in three.

=== Houston Texans ===
Toner signed with the Houston Texans on March 22, 2021. He was released on August 31. Toner was signed to the practice squad on October 12, and promoted to the active roster on October 30. He played in one game that season, a Week 16 win against the Chargers. Three days later, on December 29, Toner was placed on injured reserve.

=== Los Angeles Rams ===
On November 23, 2022, Toner was signed to the practice squad of the Los Angeles Rams. His practice squad contract expired when the team's season ended on January 9, 2023.
