= Givens Price =

American football player (born 1994)

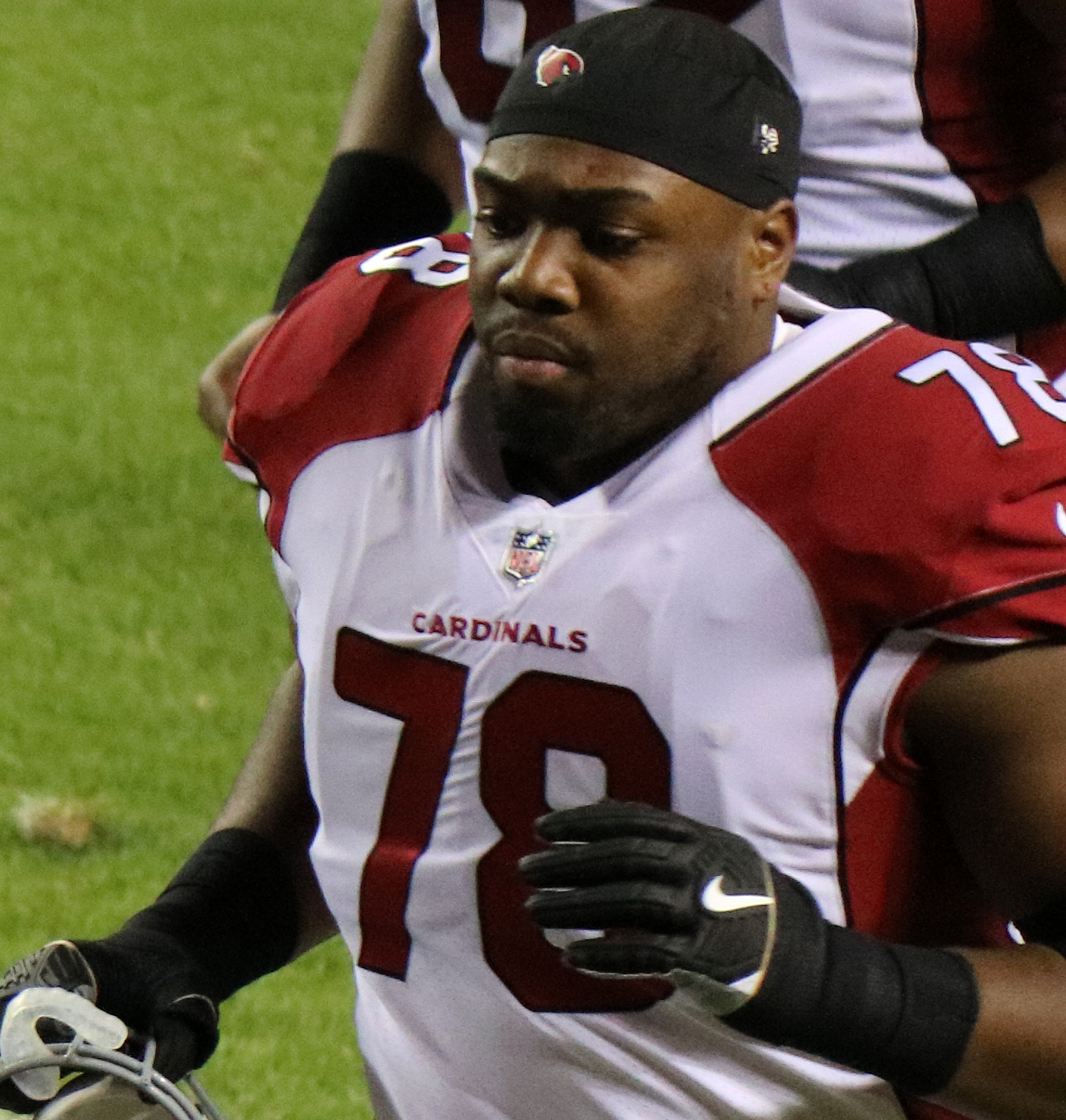
- Price in the 2017 NFL preseason.

No. 63, 78, 64, 67
- Position: Offensive tackle

Personal information
- Born: October 3, 1994 (age 32); Houston, Texas, U.S.
- Listed height: 6 ft 4 in (1.93 m)
- Listed weight: 310 lb (141 kg)

Career information
- High school: Alief Taylor (Houston)
- College: Nebraska
- NFL draft: 2016: undrafted

Career history
- Arizona Cardinals (2016–2017); Washington Redskins (2017)*; Tampa Bay Buccaneers (2017–2018)*
- * Offseason or practice squad member only

Awards and highlights
- Gator Bowl champion (2014); Foster Farms Bowl champion (2015)

Career NFL statistics
- Games played: 1
- Games started: 0
- Stats at Pro Football Reference

Givens Price (born October 3, 1994) is an American former professional football player who was an offensive tackle in the National Football League (NFL). He played college football for the Nebraska Cornhuskers. He was signed by the Arizona Cardinals as an undrafted free agent after the 2016 NFL draft.

== Early life ==
Price attended Alief Taylor High School where he was offensive guard. As a senior, in 2010, he helped the team average 39.6 points-per-game. He was a second-team Class 5A All-State selection. He was rated one of the top 70 offensive guards in the nation by both ESPN and Scout. He was recruited by Baylor, Rice, and UTEP.

== College career ==
Price enrolled at the University of Nebraska–Lincoln to play for the Cornhuskers and majored in accounting and management. In 2011, as a freshman he redshirt the season. As a redshirt freshman in 2012, he appeared in three games as a back-up offensive lineman. In 2013 as a redshirt sophomore, he appeared in eight games as a back-up guard, late season injuries increased his role on the offense. As a redshirt junior in 2014, he appeared in 12 games, starting three games at right tackle. During his first career start, against Florida Atlantic, he helped the Nebraska offense set a Big Ten, modern era, single game record for total offense with 784 yards, including 498 rushing yards. In 2015, he converted to the defensive line to help provide depth. He appeared in two games that season.

== Professional career ==
=== Arizona Cardinals ===
After going undrafted in the 2016 NFL draft, Price signed with the Arizona Cardinals on May 2, 2016. He was released during final cuts on September 3, and was re-signed to the Cardinals' practice squad the following day. On December 14, Price was promoted to the active roster. He made his professional debut during Week 17 against the Los Angeles Rams.

On September 2, 2017, Price was waived by the Cardinals. He re-signed to the practice squad on September 12. Price was released two days later. He was re-signed to the practice squad on October 11, but was released again on October 24.

=== Washington Redskins ===
On October 31, 2017, Price was signed to the Washington Redskins' practice squad. He was released by the Redskins on November 8.

=== Tampa Bay Buccaneers ===
On November 22, 2017, Price was signed to the Tampa Bay Buccaneers' practice squad. He signed a reserve/future contract with the Buccaneers on January 3, 2018. On September 1, Price was waived by the Buccaneers.
