= James Bettcher =

American football coach (born 1978)

Indianapolis Colts
- Title: Linebackers coach

Personal information
- Born: May 27, 1978 (age 48); Lakeville, Indiana, U.S.

Career information
- High school: Lakeville (IN) LaVille
- College: Saint Francis (IN)

Career history
- Saint Francis (IN) (2004–2005) Special teams coordinator & defensive line coach; Bowling Green (2006) Graduate assistant; North Carolina (2007–2009) Defensive assistant–graduate assistant; Ball State (2010) Special teams coach & defensive ends coach; New Hampshire (2011) Linebackers coach & special teams coach; Indianapolis Colts (2012) Outside linebackers coach; Arizona Cardinals (2013–2014) Outside linebackers coach; Arizona Cardinals (2015–2017) Defensive coordinator; New York Giants (2018–2019) Defensive coordinator; San Francisco 49ers (2021) Senior defensive assistant; Cincinnati Bengals (2022–2024) Linebackers coach; Indianapolis Colts (2025–present) Linebackers coach
- Coaching profile at Pro Football Reference

James Bettcher (born May 27, 1978) is an American football coach who is currently the linebackers coach for the Indianapolis Colts of the National Football League (NFL). He has previously served as the defensive coordinator for the Arizona Cardinals and New York Giants.

== Coaching career ==
=== College ===
Bettcher began his coaching career in 2004 as special teams coordinator & defensive line coach for Saint Francis (IN). He then served as a graduate assistant for Bowling Green, before holding positions for North Carolina, Ball State and New Hampshire.

=== NFL ===
After coaching at numerous colleges, Bettcher was hired by the Indianapolis Colts of the NFL. He coached under Bruce Arians when Arians was interim head coach of the Colts. When Arians was hired by the Cardinals as head coach, Bettcher followed him to Arizona. After defensive coordinator Todd Bowles left to become head coach of the New York Jets, Bettcher was promoted to take his place. As defensive coordinator the Cardinals never finished below 7th in the league in overall defense. After the retirement of head coach Bruce Arians, Bettcher was seen as the most likely successor, even bringing in a plan for a coaching staff that included Mike McCoy as offensive coordinator and Chuck Pagano as defensive coordinator. However, the Cardinals opted to hire former Carolina Panthers defensive coordinator, Steve Wilks, instead.

On January 23, 2018, Bettcher was hired by the New York Giants to serve as defensive coordinator under head coach Pat Shurmur. Betcher was not retained for the 2020 season by new Giants head coach Joe Judge who instead hired Patrick Graham.

In 2021, Bettcher was hired by the San Francisco 49ers as a defensive assistant.

In 2022 he was hired as the linebackers coach for the Cincinnati Bengals. Bettcher was fired by the Cincinnati Bengals on January 6, 2025.

On January 26, 2025, Bettcher was hired as the linebackers coach for the Indianapolis Colts, joining Lou Anarumo, who he previously worked with in Cincinnati.
