= Bruce Arians =

American football coach (born 1952)

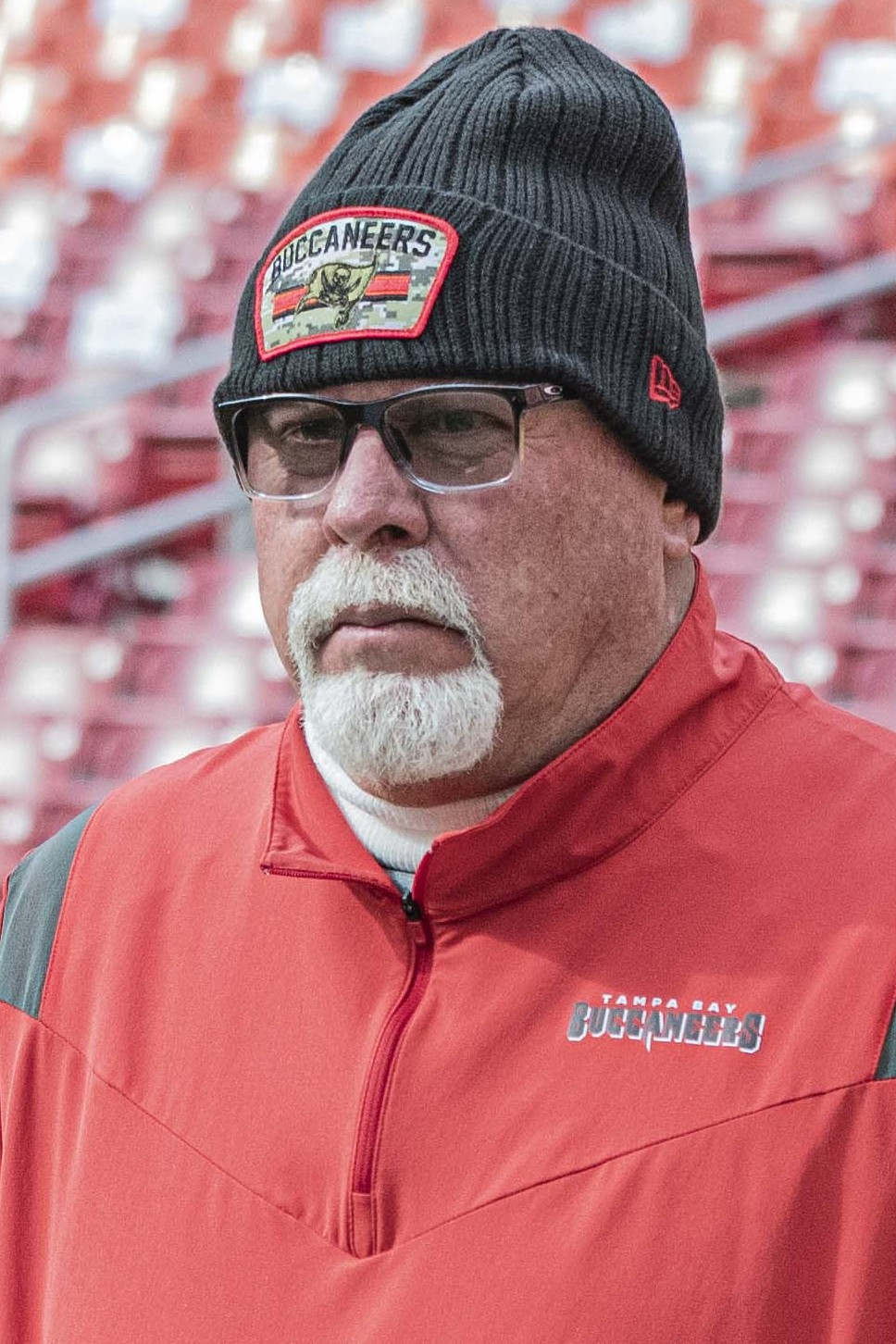
- Arians with the Tampa Bay Buccaneers in 2021

Personal information
- Born: October 3, 1952 (age 74); Paterson, New Jersey, U.S.

Career information
- Position: Quarterback
- High school: William Penn (York, Pennsylvania)
- College: Virginia Tech (1971–1974)

Career history

Coaching
- Virginia Tech (1975–1977) Graduate assistant; Mississippi State (1978–1980) Wide receivers coach & running backs coach; Alabama (1981–1982) Running backs coach; Temple (1983–1988) Head coach; Kansas City Chiefs (1989–1992) Running backs coach; Mississippi State (1993–1995) Offensive coordinator; New Orleans Saints (1996) Tight ends coach; Alabama (1997) Offensive coordinator & quarterbacks coach; Indianapolis Colts (1998–2000) Quarterbacks coach; Cleveland Browns (2001–2003) Offensive coordinator; Pittsburgh Steelers (2004–2006) Wide receivers coach; Pittsburgh Steelers (2007–2011) Offensive coordinator; Indianapolis Colts (2012) Offensive coordinator & interim head coach; Arizona Cardinals (2013–2017) Head coach; Tampa Bay Buccaneers (2019–2021) Head coach

Operations
- Tampa Bay Buccaneers (2022–2026) Senior football consultant

Awards and highlights
- As head coach: Super Bowl champion (LV); 2× AP NFL Coach of the Year (2012, 2014); 3× Greasy Neale Award (2012, 2014, 2020); Cardinals career wins leader (50); Buccaneers highest win percentage (.651); Tampa Bay Buccaneers Ring of Honor; NFL record: Oldest head coach to win the Super Bowl (68); As assistant coach: 2× Super Bowl champion (XL, XLIII)

Head coaching record
- Regular season: NCAA: 21–39 (.350); NFL: 80–48–1 (.624)
- Postseason: 6–3 (.667)
- Career: NCAA: 21–39 (.350); NFL: 86–51–1 (.627)
- Coaching profile at Pro Football Reference

Bruce Charles Arians (born October 3, 1952) is an American football executive and former coach in the National Football League (NFL). Since 2022, he has been a senior football consultant for the Tampa Bay Buccaneers. Arians was previously the head coach of the Temple Owls from 1983 to 1987, the Arizona Cardinals from 2013 to 2017 and the Buccaneers from 2019 to 2021. He was also the interim head coach of the Indianapolis Colts during the 2012 season. Arians is known as a "quarterback whisperer" with a "no risk-it, no biscuit" slogan, which encourages aggressive playcalling. Under Arians's coaching, several high-profile quarterbacks were named to the All-Pro team or Pro Bowl, including Peyton Manning, Ben Roethlisberger, Andrew Luck, Carson Palmer, and Tom Brady.

An offensive assistant for most of his career, Arians helped the Pittsburgh Steelers win Super Bowl XL as their wide receivers coach and then Super Bowl XLIII as their offensive coordinator. While previously serving as head coach at Temple, Arians had his first NFL head coaching experience at age 59 when Colts head coach Chuck Pagano was treated for leukemia. Originally hired as their offensive coordinator, Arians became the Colts' interim head coach for 12 weeks, guiding a team that went 2–14 the previous season to a 9–3 record and earning them a playoff berth. He was named AP NFL Coach of the Year for the season and was the first interim head coach to receive the honor.

His success in Indianapolis led to Arians getting hired as an NFL head coach for the first time at age 60, serving the position for five seasons with the Cardinals. During his tenure in Arizona, Arians led the team to two postseason runs, a division title, and an NFC Championship Game appearance in 2015. He received a second Coach of the Year award after the 2014 season, and retired after 2017 as the Cardinals' winningest head coach. Arians then came out of retirement in 2019 to coach the Buccaneers. He led the team to their first postseason appearance since 2007 during the 2020 season, culminating with a victory in Super Bowl LV. At age 68, he was the oldest head coach to win a Super Bowl. After guiding the Buccaneers to a division title and another postseason appearance in the 2021 season, Arians retired from coaching again and became a consultant with Tampa Bay.

== Early life ==
A native of Paterson, New Jersey, Arians graduated from William Penn Senior High School in York, Pennsylvania. He previously attended York Catholic High School, where he was a standout scholastic quarterback.

== Playing career ==
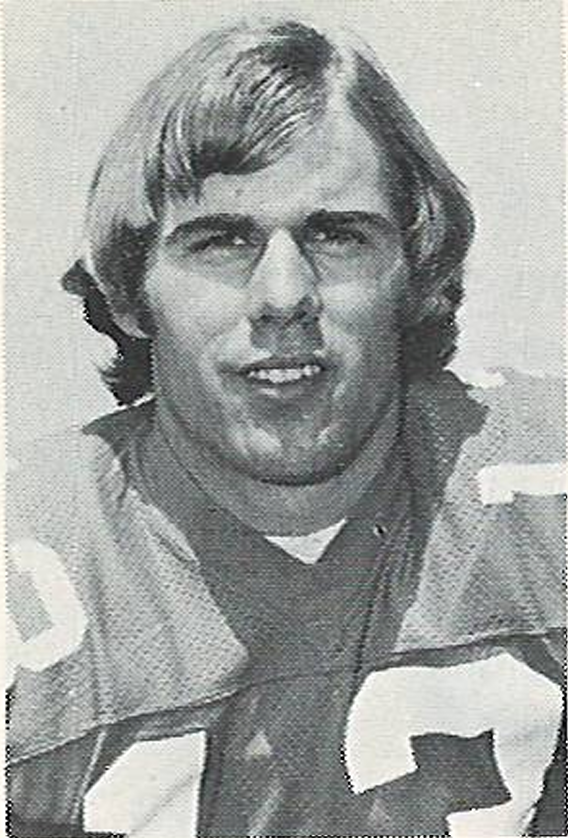
Arians at Virginia Tech, c. 1972

Arians played college football at Virginia Tech in Blacksburg, Virginia. As a senior in 1974, he was the starting quarterback in a wishbone offense for the independent Hokies, and completed 53 of 118 passes (44.9%) for 952 yards with three passing touchdowns and seven interceptions. Arians rushed for 243 yards and eleven touchdowns, which set a school record for most quarterback rushing touchdowns in a season; it stood for 42 years, until broken by Jerod Evans in 2016. He was also the first white player to share a dorm room with a black player in school history; his roommate was James Barber, father of Ronde and Tiki Barber. The two were given the nickname "Salt and Pepper".

== Coaching career ==
=== Early years ===
Arians began his coaching career in 1975 as a graduate assistant at Virginia Tech. Arians then held an assistant coaching position at Mississippi State University (running backs and wide receivers) from 1978 to 1980 before heading to the University of Alabama to coach the running backs from 1981 to 1982 under Paul "Bear" Bryant.

Arians was also the head coach at Temple University from 1983 to 1988. While head coach for the Owls, he compiled a 27–39 overall record over six seasons. He had two winning records on the field, in 1984 and 1986; the Owls finished 6–5 both seasons. However, all of the 1986 wins were later forfeited after it emerged that running back Paul Palmer, who was the runner-up in the Heisman Trophy voting in 1986, had signed with a sports agent before the season. Besides Palmer, other standout players Arians coached at Temple included cornerback Kevin Ross, safety Todd Bowles, and running back Todd McNair. Ross, Bowles, and McNair all later served as NFL assistant coaches with or under Arians.

At the end of the Temple football season in 1988, Arians was hired in the NFL as a running backs coach for the Kansas City Chiefs under Marty Schottenheimer. It was during this time with the Chiefs that he worked with the coach who eventually brought him to the Pittsburgh Steelers, Bill Cowher. He held positions with Mississippi State (offensive coordinator, 1993–95), New Orleans Saints (tight ends, 1996), and Alabama (offensive coordinator, 1997) following this.

=== Indianapolis Colts (1998–2000) ===
Following this stint was when he made a name for himself when he got the job as the quarterbacks coach of the Indianapolis Colts under Jim E. Mora in 1998. He was the first quarterback coach of Peyton Manning when the latter arrived in the NFL. Arians spent three years with the team, guiding Manning and helping him gain confidence through his early seasons.

=== Cleveland Browns (2001–2003) ===
Afterward, he was hired as offensive coordinator for the Cleveland Browns under Butch Davis. In 2002, he helped the Browns finish 9–7 (2nd in the newly aligned AFC North) and to a Wild Card Round berth where they lost to the Pittsburgh Steelers (36–33). It was during his tenure with the Browns that he first worked with Chuck Pagano who served as the Browns secondary coach and eventually brought Arians back to the Indianapolis Colts.

=== Pittsburgh Steelers (2004–2011) ===
After the 2003 season, Arians was hired by Steelers head coach Cowher as wide receivers coach, helping the team in winning Super Bowl XL. In 2007 he was promoted to offensive coordinator, and later won Super Bowl XLIII. In addition to coaching quarterback Ben Roethlisberger, Arians also became acquainted with former first-round draft pick Byron Leftwich, who backed up Roethlisberger and was later hired as one of Arians's prominent assistant coaches.

Despite his success in Pittsburgh, he had his fair share of critics. He was a gambling man who liked to take big risks that didn't sit well with fans. For instance, on a 3rd & 1, instead of running the ball or making a short quick pass, he wanted to air it out downfield. According to Arians, "I got booed in the Super Bowl parade. I look over and I hear 'get a fullback', and I say 'never'." In Arians's offense the quarterback is often exposed: Roethlisberger took a high number of sacks every year and it left the Steelers front office unhappy. This led the front office to not renew Arians's contract as offensive coordinator when it expired after the 2011 season. Arians initially announced his retirement from coaching after not being offered a contract.

=== Indianapolis Colts (2012) ===
On January 28, 2012, shortly after his supposed retirement, Arians was hired by new Indianapolis Colts head coach Pagano to become his offensive coordinator, replacing Clyde Christensen. It was his second stint with the franchise, having previously served as the quarterbacks' coach for the Colts from 1998 to 2000. He was briefly reunited with Manning until the latter's release 2 months later. The 2012 season marked the arrival of new rookie quarterback Andrew Luck to the Colts, who Arians was tasked with developing.

On October 1, 2012, Arians was named the interim head coach of the Colts following Pagano's leukemia diagnosis. Arians led the Colts to a 9–3 record, part of one of the biggest one-season turnarounds in NFL history. The nine wins are the most by an interim head coach in NFL history. After winning only two games in 2011, the Colts returned to the playoffs. Pagano returned to the Colts as head coach on December 24, 2012, with Arians returning to his role as offensive coordinator. Arians missed the Colts' Wild Card Round loss against the Baltimore Ravens due to being hospitalized with an illness, which was described by doctors as an inner ear infection or a virus; Arians had missed practice on January 3 due to the flu. Arians was named the 2012 AP Coach of the Year, making him the first interim head coach to win the award.

=== Arizona Cardinals (2013–2017) ===
On January 17, 2013, the Arizona Cardinals and Arians agreed on a 4-year deal that made Arians their 40th head coach, succeeding Ken Whisenhunt. A few months later, the Cardinals traded for quarterback Carson Palmer from the Oakland Raiders to pair him with the team's star wide receiver Larry Fitzgerald. Arians began his rookie head coaching year 3–4, but led the Cardinals to win seven of their last nine games to end the 2013 season with a 10–6 record. This doubled the number of wins from the 5–11 record the team had posted the year before. Arians was the first Cardinals head coach since Norm Barry in 1925 to record at least nine wins in his first season.

The Cardinals finished the 2014 season with an 11–5 record and were the #5 seed in the NFC. The 11 wins tied a Cardinals franchise record for most wins in a season. Arians led the Cardinals to a 9–1 start, best in the NFL, but injuries to Palmer (who was 6–0 as the starter) and backup Drew Stanton, (who was 5–3 as starter) led to the eventual NFC champion Seattle Seahawks claiming the divisional title with a 12–4 record. Roughly half the team was put on injured reserve between Week 8 and Week 17. The injury plagued Cardinals with Ryan Lindley starting at quarterback were eliminated by the Carolina Panthers in the Wild Card Round, 27–16. Following the season, Arians was named Associated Press Head Coach of the Year for the second time in three seasons.

On February 23, 2015, the Cardinals announced a new four-year deal with Arians which kept him with the Cardinals through the 2018 season. After starting 3–0 for a second consecutive season, Arians led the Cardinals to a 13–3 record for the 2015 season, setting a new franchise record for regular season wins. A week 15 win against the Philadelphia Eagles on Sunday Night Football saw the Cardinals win their first NFC West title since 2009, clinching a postseason appearance in the process. The Cardinals defeated the Green Bay Packers 26–20 in overtime in the Divisional Round, Arians's first playoff win as a head coach. It was also only the fifth home playoff game in franchise history. The next Sunday, in the NFC Championship, the Cardinals were defeated again by the Carolina Panthers, this time in a 49–15 blowout.

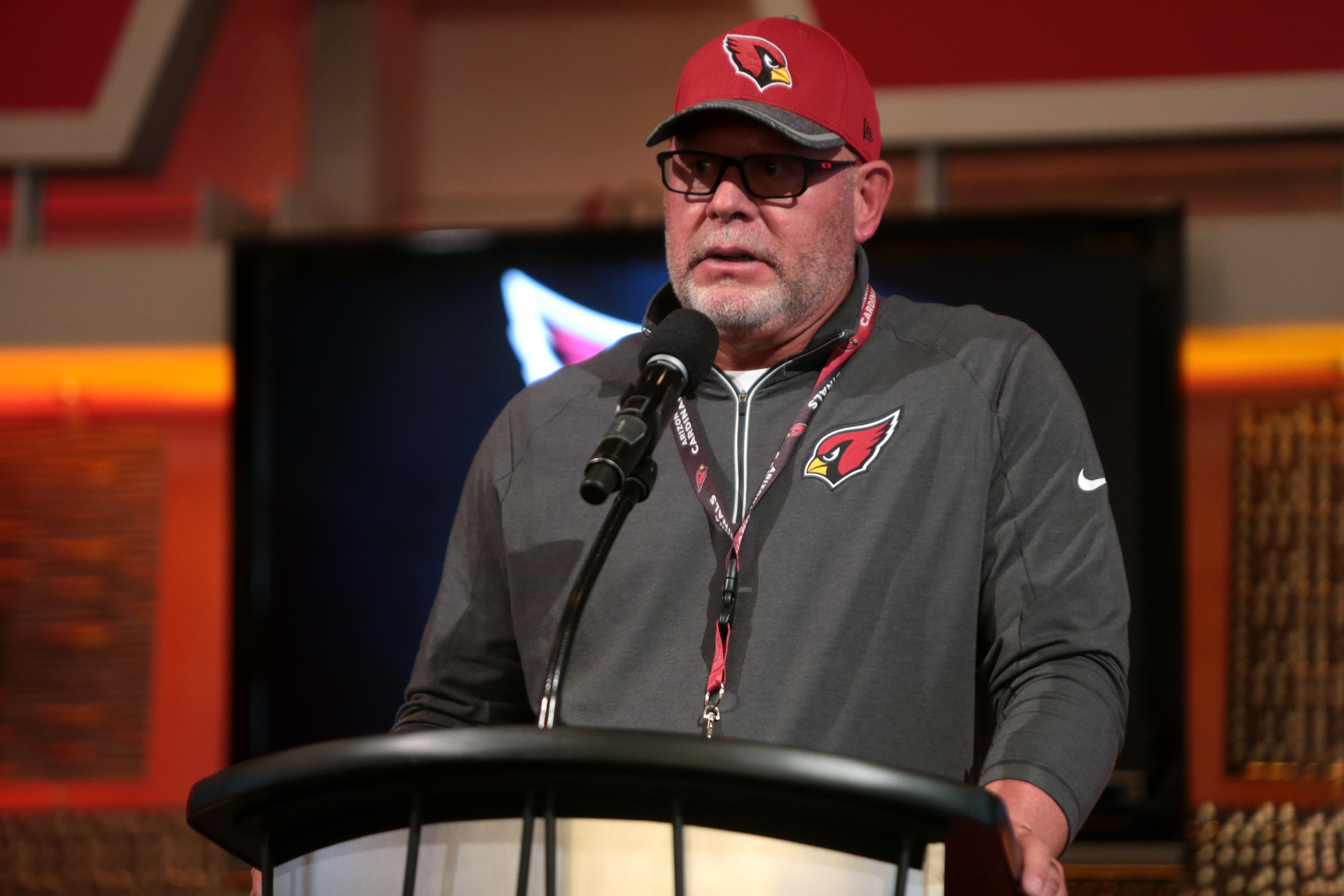
Arians in 2016

Arians did not lead the Cardinals to another winning record or postseason appearance in his final two years in Arizona. In the 2016 season, Arians led the Cardinals to a 7–8–1 record, with five of the losses within one possession. During the 2017 season, Arians led the Cardinals to an 8–8 record, again missing the playoffs. The season finale against the Seattle Seahawks on New Year's Eve was Arians's final game with the Cardinals. The 26–24 away win marked Arians's 50th and final career win with the Cardinals, surpassing Whisenhunt as the franchise's winningest head coach.

The next day, Arians announced his retirement from coaching after five seasons with the Cardinals, despite having a year left on his contract. He said in his retirement statement: "I always told Carson [Palmer] and future Hall of Famer Larry Fitzgerald that we were like three old gunfighters looking to go out in a blaze of glory with a Super Bowl win. It pains me that I couldn't help them accomplish our goal." Arians finished his tenure in Arizona with a 49–30–1 (.614) regular season record and a pair of playoff appearances, where he had a 1–2 (.333) record. He was succeeded by Steve Wilks.

=== Tampa Bay Buccaneers (2019–2021) ===
After spending one season as a broadcaster, Arians agreed to terms on a four-year contract to come out of retirement and became the 12th head coach of the Tampa Bay Buccaneers on January 8, 2019, succeeding Dirk Koetter. As Arians was still under contract with the Cardinals, Tampa Bay traded their sixth-round pick for Arizona's seventh-round pick in the 2019 NFL draft in order to receive Arians's rights to hire him.

Arians assembled the largest coaching staff in the NFL for the 2019 season, at a total of 28 assistants. Arians stated in the offseason for the Buccaneers that he could win with the team he had, and also put his faith in Jameis Winston, saying: "I think with (quarterbacks coach) Clyde Christensen and (offensive coordinator) Byron Leftwich, he's in great hands." He also made it known one of his intentions was fixing the defensive secondary, which the year before had surrendered a league worst passer rating (110.9), yards per attempt (8.2) and completion percentage (72.5). In his first year with the team, Arians led the Buccaneers to a 7–9 record, finishing third in the NFC South.

Before the 2020 season, the Buccaneers signed longtime New England Patriots quarterback Tom Brady to a two-year contract on March 20, 2020. They traded for Brady's former teammate and former Patriots tight end Rob Gronkowski on April 21, 2020, and he came out of retirement to play for the Buccaneers with Brady. Arians led the Buccaneers to an 11–5 record, earning a Wild Card spot - their first playoff berth since 2007. After winning three straight road games against the Washington Football Team, New Orleans Saints, and Green Bay Packers, the Buccaneers reached their second Super Bowl appearance in Super Bowl LV. The playoff victories were the Buccaneers' first since the 2002 season when they won Super Bowl XXXVII, and Arians was the first head coach to lead an NFL team to play and win a Super Bowl in their home stadium when they defeated the Kansas City Chiefs 31–9 in the Super Bowl.

During the 2021 season, the Buccaneers won their NFC South title since 2007 with a 13–4 record. One notable game during the season involved Brady returning to New England to lead the Buccaneers to a 19–17 victory against his former team. In the playoffs, the Buccaneers defeated the Philadelphia Eagles in the Wild Card Round, but lost to the eventual Super Bowl LVI champion Los Angeles Rams during the Divisional Round in what was Arians's final game as an NFL head coach.

On March 30, 2022, Arians informed his staff that he was stepping down from the head coach position and would be succeeded by Buccaneers defensive coordinator Todd Bowles. Arians had always planned on having Bowles succeed him as head coach when he eventually retired, and stated that Brady announcing his return for the 2022 season played a role in accelerating his decision as it ensured that Bowles would have the benefit of a great quarterback on the roster and that continuity would exist amongst the coaching staff.

In three years with the Buccaneers, Arians amassed a 31–18 (.633) regular season record and a 5–1 (.833) postseason record. During this period, Tampa Bay led the NFL in points scored (29.8 per game), passing yards (300.0 per game), passing touchdowns (118), completions (1,284), and passing first downs (755). They also ranked third in total yards (396.2 per game), fourth in first downs (22.9 per game), and seventh in sacks allowed (92). For his contributions to the franchise, Arians was the 14th inductee into the Tampa Bay Buccaneers Ring of Honor on January 1, 2023.

== Executive career ==
Arians remained with the Tampa Bay Buccaneers organization after stepping down as their head coach. He joined their front office as Senior Football Consultant. During the 2022 season, the NFL sent Arians a warning due to his actions in a Week 2 matchup against the New Orleans Saints. Despite no longer being a coach, Arians was seen on the sideline during the game, and became very animated towards the referees when Saints cornerback Marshon Lattimore was not called for pass interference on a pass to Buccaneers wide receiver Scotty Miller. As an executive, Arians was not meant to be on the field, but new head coach Todd Bowles mentioned that Arians was only on the sideline because the Saints had not provided him and general manager Jason Licht a personal booth. The NFL warned that similar conduct in the future resulted in discipline for Arians and the club.

Following the season, several of the Buccaneers coaching staff that Arians had initially hired when he was head coach were not retained, including offensive coordinator Byron Leftwich. Arians was said to be "extremely unhappy" with these changes. It was also reported that Arians's contract had expired after the season, leaving him free to leave the Buccaneers. However, Arians remained with the organization, even publicly endorsing Bowles and Licht to remain as the Buccaneers's respective head coach and general manager after the 2025 season despite finishing outside the playoffs with an 8–9 record.

== Broadcast and media career ==
On May 3, 2018, Arians joined CBS Sports as a game analyst for the NFL on CBS for the 2018 season, working with Greg Gumbel and Trent Green. He left the role after returning to the NFL as head coach of the Tampa Bay Buccaneers.

During the 2025 NFL season, Arians joined The Pat McAfee Show as a recurring guest every Tuesday to discuss league developments.

== Coaching philosophy ==
=== "No risk-it, no biscuit" ===
Arians's coaching philosophy can be summed up with one phrase: "No risk it, no biscuit. You can't live scared." His former quarterback in Arizona, Carson Palmer, says, "You play for him, you see he just has guts. He will let it rip, let it fly no matter what." Arians first developed this philosophy when the old-timers at the bar he worked at in college told him, "In life you must take risks." During games, Arians always gave the quarterback at least two options based on how the defense lines up. Arians stated: "One option will give us a chance to make a first down and the other option will give us a chance to score a touchdown." All his quarterbacks must believe, "If I have the right match up and the opportunity is there to take a shot at the deep ball, take it. I don't care if it's a third-and-three; if our best receiver is in single coverage and he's running a deep post route, throw him the goddamn ball." One thing Arians cannot stand is when coaches play not to lose. He considers conservative coaching to be a cardinal sin. In his book, Arians writes, "That's not my way, brother. I'll never be too afraid to throw it and take the heat if it's incomplete. My job as an offensive coach is not to allow our defense to retake the field. Run out the clock and kneel down—that's my job."

=== Quarterback development and team relationships ===
Arians has an image of what the perfect NFL quarterback looks like. In his book, Arians wrote: "It's something you cannot see. He must have a big lion's heart, a heart that beats for an entire franchise." He says the heart is exhibited when a quarterback plays through pain, when he smashes into a 320-pound defensive linemen on third down to gain six extra inches for the first down. Or when he throws a pick and runs forty yards down field to make a tackle. What he calls "grit" is a must-have ability to make the dozens of decisions that need to be made in the twenty-five seconds the quarterback walks on the line of scrimmage and scans the defense to when the play is over. On the practice field, Arians is known to spend most of the time with his quarterbacks reviewing what transpires during the three to four seconds of a basic pass play. Arians believes the first thing the quarterback has to understand is his protection, since the defense can always blitz one more guy than your linemen can block. Because of this, the quarterback has to look and read what will be coming from the opposing defense.

A primary reason Arians is known as a "quarterback whisperer" is the special relationship he has had with all of his quarterbacks as well as the production he has gotten out of them. While being a caring coach, Arians is also known to be hard on his quarterbacks. When Peyton Manning had a bad game the first time he faced New England his rookie year with Indianapolis—he threw three interceptions midway through the fourth quarter of the game—he was so frustrated he begged Arians, who at the time was the team's quarterback coach, to be pulled. Arians responded by saying: "F--k no. Get back in there. We'll go no-huddle, and maybe you'll learn something." After Tom Brady's first game with Tampa Bay, Arians publicly talked with the media about his quarterback's mistakes, which surprised some despite it being consistent with how Arians has coached in the past. While Arians has this hard style of coaching, his former quarterbacks have always had the utmost respect for Arians and attribute him as a big factor in their success.

Arians is known to socialize with players more than most NFL coaches. After Cardinals home games, he was known to pull his car up. The trunk would be open, and Arians would be handing out drinks to his players. Arians writes: "If a player had a bad game, I'm going to give him a beer and a big sincere hug. If a player had a great game, I'm going to give him a beer and a big sincere hug." Arians particularly becomes close with his quarterbacks, not only to know what makes them tick, but also because he genuinely enjoyed the connections. "My quarterbacks have to be a member of my family, and that has nothing to do with football," Arians says. "Trust is everything. We have to connect on a deep level in order to really be able to build something together. Trust brings a higher level of communication and a higher level of commitment and accountability. We have to care for one another. It's all about family, family, family." Several of his former quarterbacks, including Palmer, Manning, Ben Roethlisberger, Andrew Luck, and Drew Stanton were noted in having close relationships with not only Arians but with his family members as well.

=== Diversity and staffing practices ===
When joining Tampa Bay, Arians immediately built a diverse staff. He stated this practice was inspired by his feeling overlooked throughout his career, having not received his first head coaching opportunity until the age of 60 despite winning two Super Bowls as an assistant. With the Buccaneers, Arians hired African-Americans at every top coaching position: Byron Leftwich as offensive coordinator, Todd Bowles as defensive coordinator, Keith Armstrong as special teams coordinator, and Harold Goodwin as assistant head coach and run-game coordinator. He also hired two female assistant coaches to the Buccaneers staff: Lori Locust as assistant defensive line coach and Maral Javadifar as assistant strength and conditioning coach/physical therapist. Arians has stated that having a diverse staff provides better output during team meetings, allowing players and staff to better learn from one another.

His decision to step down as head coach of the Buccaneers and have Bowles succeed him drew praise for providing a head coaching opportunity that was set up for success to an African-American coach, an ongoing issue in the NFL. It also showcased Arians's loyalty to Bowles, who had coached with him on the Cleveland Browns and also served as Arians's defensive coordinator with the Cardinals. When asked if his retirement would lessen his chances of entering the Pro Football Hall of Fame, Arians responded "I don't give a shit about the Hall of Fame. Succession is way more important to me. This has been my dream for a long time. Guys that know me, they knew I wanted one of my guys to take over. And that's more important to me than anything."

Arians also stressed the importance of family and parenting to his coaching staff, telling them during his first meeting in Tampa Bay that he would fire them if they missed their child's ball game or recital. Many NFL head coaches required their assistants to work long hours with strict rules on leaving the office. Marty Schottenheimer, who Arians once worked for, held this practice. However, Arians stressed that their children would not be there forever, and eventually grow up and leave the household. He wanted his assistants to be present for their children during their formative years.

== Personal life ==
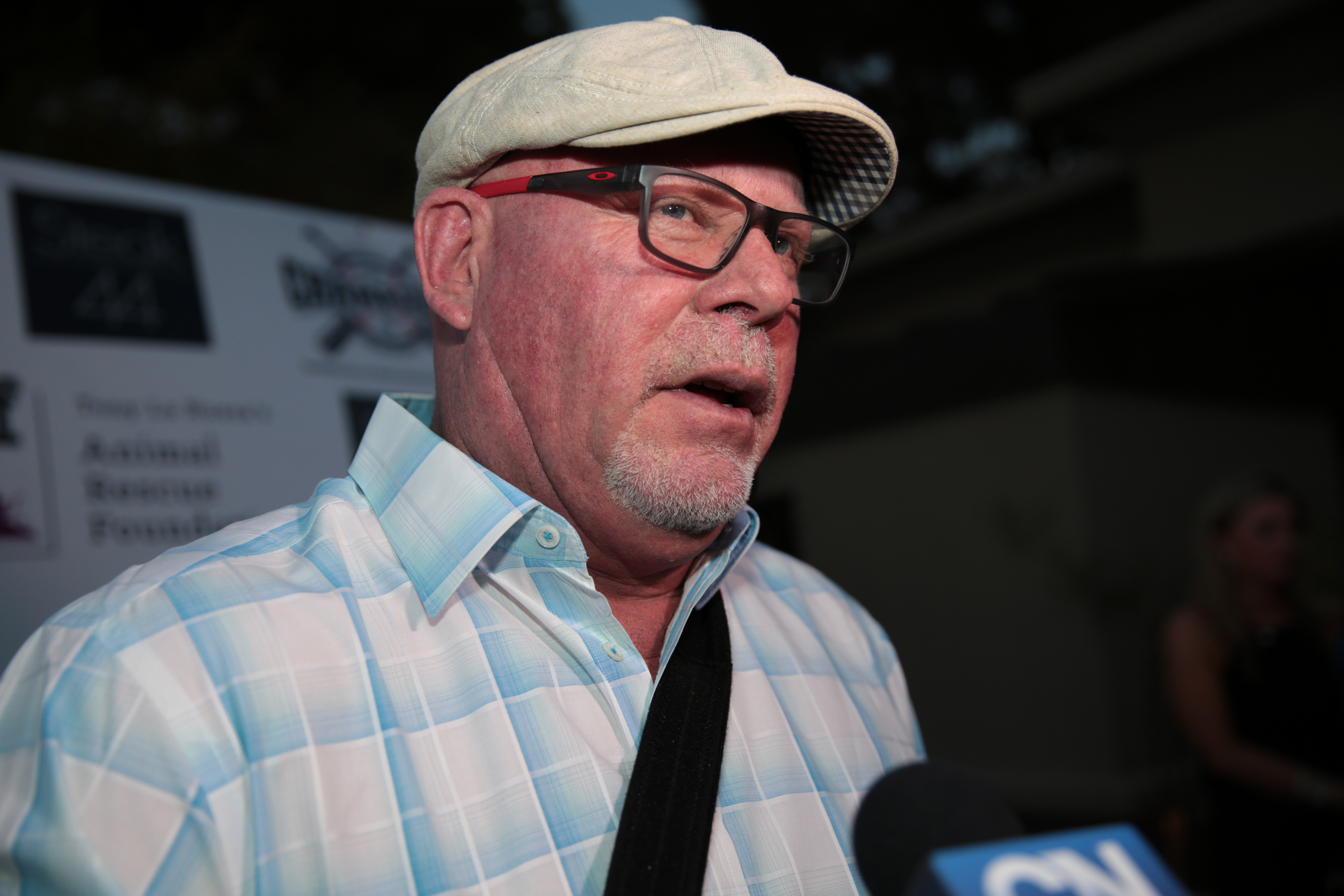
Arians at a fundraiser hosted by Tony La Russa in Phoenix, Arizona

Arians and his wife, Christine, run a charity called The Arians Family Foundation, which supports and develops programs to prevent and remedy the abuse and neglect of children. The Arians Family Foundation supports the Court Appointed Special Advocates (CASA) program.

A lifelong advocate for racial inclusion and against discrimination, Arians commented on the murder of George Floyd and the ensuing protests: "It's very disheartening [...] personally, you would hope that we would not be in 2020 still dealing with these issues. You would hope as a nation to have grown since 1968. I think we have, but not enough, obviously."

Arians is a prostate cancer survivor. He and his wife have a son, Jake (born January 26, 1978), who spent part of the 2001 season as the placekicker for the Buffalo Bills, and a daughter, Kristi Anne (born December 15, 1980). They currently maintain residences in Tampa, Florida, and on Lake Oconee in Greensboro, Georgia. Arians was also diagnosed with kidney cancer towards the end of 2016 but continued to coach the Cardinals. He was treated for surgery following the end of the season and returned to the coaching sideline in 2017, saying he was cancer-free and "feeling great".

In 2017, Arians released a book, The Quarterback Whisperer: How to Build an Elite NFL Quarterback.

On January 31, 2026, Arians stated on Today that he would be undergoing open-heart surgery.

== Head coaching record ==
=== College ===
Year	Team	Overall	Conference	Standing	Bowl/playoffs
Temple Owls (NCAA Division I-A independent) (1983–1988)
1983	Temple	4–7			
1984	Temple	6–5			
1985	Temple	4–7			
1986	Temple	6–5*			
1987	Temple	3–8			
1988	Temple	4–7			
Temple:		27–39			
Total:		27–39			

* 1986 team was 6–5 on the field, but had to vacate their wins due to the presence of an ineligible player on their roster.

=== NFL ===
Team	Year	Regular season					Postseason			
Team	Year	Won	Lost	Ties	Win %	Finish	Won	Lost	Win %	Result
IND*	2012	9	3	0	.750	2nd in AFC South	—	—	—	—
IND total		9	3	0	.750		0	0	.000	
ARI	2013	10	6	0	.625	3rd in NFC West	—	—	—	—
ARI	2014	11	5	0	.688	2nd in NFC West	0	1	.000	Lost to Carolina Panthers in NFC Wild Card Game
ARI	2015	13	3	0	.813	1st in NFC West	1	1	.500	Lost to Carolina Panthers in NFC Championship Game
ARI	2016	7	8	1	.469	2nd in NFC West	—	—	—	—
ARI	2017	8	8	0	.500	3rd in NFC West	—	—	—	—
ARI total		49	30	1	.614		1	2	.333	
TB	2019	7	9	0	.438	3rd in NFC South	—	—	—	—
TB	2020	11	5	0	.688	2nd in NFC South	4	0	1.000	Super Bowl LV champions
TB	2021	13	4	0	.765	1st in NFC South	1	1	.500	Lost to Los Angeles Rams in NFC Divisional Game
TB total		31	18	0	.633		5	1	.833	
Total		80	48	1	.624		6	3	.667	
Unofficial total		89	51	1	.635		6	3	.667	

* as interim coach, league awarded all wins and losses to Chuck Pagano. This record is not reflected in career totals.

== Books ==
- Arians, Bruce; Anderson, Lars (July 11, 2017). The Quarterback Whisperer: How to Build an Elite NFL Quarterback. New York: Hachette Books. ISBN 9780316432269. OCLC 962551970.
