= 2014 Arizona Cardinals season =

NFL team season

- Owner: Bill Bidwill
- General manager: Steve Keim
- Head coach: Bruce Arians
- Offensive coordinator: Harold Goodwin
- Defensive coordinator: Todd Bowles
- Home stadium: University of Phoenix Stadium

Results
- Record: 11–5
- Division place: 2nd NFC West
- Playoffs: Lost Wild Card Playoffs (at Panthers) 16–27
- Pro Bowlers: Justin Bethel, ST; Calais Campbell, DE; Antonio Cromartie, CB; Patrick Peterson, CB

Uniform
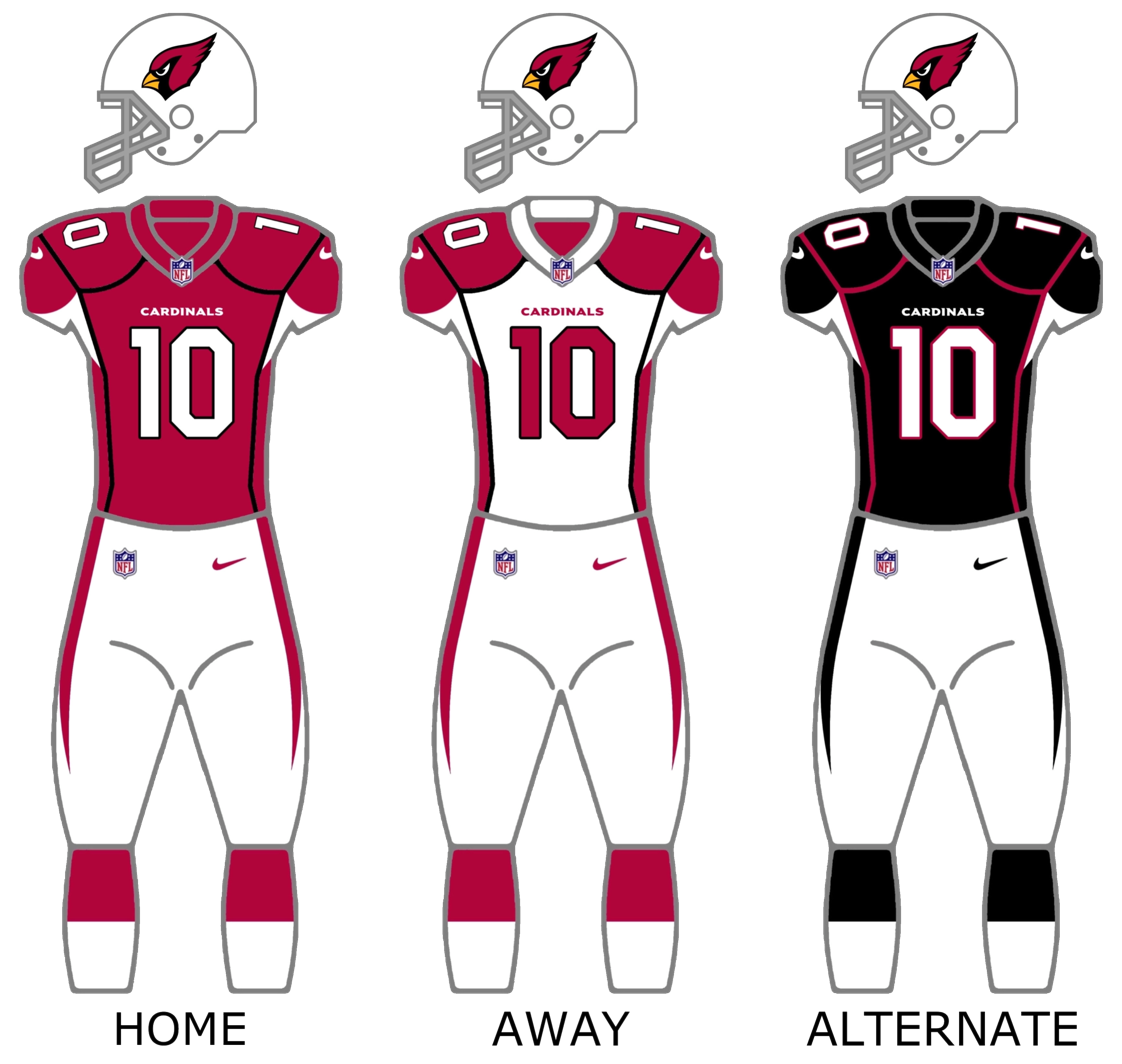

The 2014 season was the Arizona Cardinals' 95th in the National Football League (NFL), their 27th in Arizona and their second under head coach Bruce Arians. Following an explosive 9–1 start to the regular season, they finished at 11–5, achieving their highest win total since 1975 when they were still in St. Louis (also their highest total in a 16-game season). The Cardinals clinched their first playoff berth since 2009, and had a chance to become the first team to play the Super Bowl on their own home field, University of Phoenix Stadium. However, after season-ending injuries to Carson Palmer and Drew Stanton, they were forced to start third-string quarterback Ryan Lindley in the wild-card round, losing to the Carolina Panthers, 27–16, which was the first time since 1982 when they were in St. Louis that the Cardinals went one-and-done.

== Draft ==
2014 Arizona Cardinals draft
Round	Pick	Player	Position	College	Notes
1	27	Deone Bucannon	S	Washington St	Pick from NO
2	52	Troy Niklas	TE	Notre Dame	
3	84	Kareem Martin	DE	North Carolina	
3	91	John Brown	WR	Pittsburg St	Pick from NO
4	120	Logan Thomas	QB	Virginia Tech	
5	160	Ed Stinson	DE	Alabama	
6	196	Walt Powell	WR	Murray St	
Made roster † Pro Football Hall of Fame * Made at least one Pro Bowl during career

- Note: The Cardinals traded their original first-round selection (No. 20 overall) to the New Orleans Saints in exchange for the Saints' first- (No. 27 overall) and third- (No. 91 overall) round selections.

== Staff ==
2014 Arizona Cardinals staff
Front office: Owner/chairman – Bill Bidwill; President – Michael Bidwill; General manager – Steve Keim; Vice president of player personnel – Terry McDonough; Director of college scouting – Dru Grigson; Director of pro scouting – Quentin Harris; Head coaches: Head coach – Bruce Arians; Assistant head coach/offense – Tom Moore; Offensive coaches: Offensive coordinator/offensive line – Harold Goodwin; Quarterbacks – Freddie Kitchens; Running backs – Stump Mitchell; Wide receivers – Darryl Drake; Tight ends – Rick Christophel; Assistant tight ends/assistant special teams – Steve Heiden; Assistant offensive line – Larry Zierlein; Offensive assistant – David Diaz-Infante; Offensive quality control – Kevin Garver	Defensive coaches: Defensive coordinator – Todd Bowles; Defensive line – Brentson Buckner; Outside linebackers – James Bettcher; Inside linebackers – Mike Caldwell; Defensive backs – Nick Rapone; Cornerbacks – Kevin Ross; Defensive assistant/assistant defensive backs – Ryan Slowik; Pass rush specialist – Tom Pratt; Special teams coaches: Special teams coordinator – Amos Jones; Assistant special teams – Anthony Blevins; Strength and conditioning: Strength and conditioning – Buddy Morris; Assistant strength and conditioning – Pete Alosi; Assistant strength and conditioning – Roger Kingdom

== Final roster ==
2014 Arizona Cardinals roster
Quarterbacks (QB): 14 Ryan Lindley; 5 Drew Stanton; 6 Logan Thomas; Running backs (RB): 23 Marion Grice; 39 Robert Hughes FB; 30 Stepfan Taylor; 33 Kerwynn Williams; Wide receivers (WR): 13 Jaron Brown; 12 John Brown; 11 Larry Fitzgerald; 15 Michael Floyd; 19 Ted Ginn Jr. RS; 10 Brittan Golden; Tight ends (TE): 89 John Carlson; 85 Darren Fells; 84 Rob Housler	Offensive linemen (OL): 61 Jonathan Cooper G; 74 Paul Fanaika G; 62 Ted Larsen G; 70 Bobby Massie T; 63 Lyle Sendlein C; 79 Bradley Sowell T; 71 Anthony Steen G; 68 Jared Veldheer T; 78 Earl Watford G; Defensive linemen (DL): 93 Calais Campbell DE; 95 Tommy Kelly; 96 Kareem Martin DE; 73 Josh Mauro DE; 98 Frostee Rucker DE; 66 Alameda Ta'amu NT; 92 Dan Williams NT	Linebackers (LB): 94 Sam Acho OLB; 97 Lorenzo Alexander OLB; 59 Marcus Benard OLB; 56 Glenn Carson ILB; 54 Kenny Demens ILB; 50 Larry Foote ILB; 51 Kevin Minter ILB; 57 Alex Okafor OLB; 91 Matt Shaughnessy OLB; Defensive backs (DB): 28 Justin Bethel CB; 36 Deone Bucannon SS; 29 Chris Clemons SS; 31 Antonio Cromartie CB; 22 Tony Jefferson SS; 26 Rashad Johnson FS; 32 Tyrann Mathieu S; 21 Patrick Peterson CB; 25 Jerraud Powers CB; Special teams (ST): 2 Drew Butler P; 7 Chandler Catanzaro K; 82 Mike Leach LS	Practice squad: 34 Zach Bauman RB; 75 John Fullington G; 80 Andre Hardy Jr. TE; 17 Travis Harvey WR; 46 Jimmy Legree CB; 4 Jeff Mathews QB; 69 Kelvin Palmer T; 86 Ryan Spadola WR; 37 Ross Weaver CB; 27 Darren Woodard CB; Reserve: 55 John Abraham OLB (IR); 90 Darnell Dockett DE (IR); 20 Jonathan Dwyer RB (NF-Inj.); 38 Andre Ellington RB (IR); 87 Troy Niklas TE (IR); 3 Carson Palmer QB (IR); 72 Ed Stinson DE (IR); 58 Daryl Washington ILB (Susp.); 41 Eddie Whitley CB (IR); 9 Dave Zastudil P (IR); Rookies in italics 53 active, 10 reserve, 10 practice squad

== Preseason ==
=== Schedule ===
Week	Date	Opponent	Result	Record	Venue	Recap
1	August 9	Houston Texans	W 32–0	1–0	University of Phoenix Stadium	Recap
2	August 16	at Minnesota Vikings	L 28–30	1–1	TCF Bank Stadium	Recap
3	August 24	Cincinnati Bengals	L 13–19	1–2	University of Phoenix Stadium	Recap
4	August 28	at San Diego Chargers	L 9–12	1–3	Qualcomm Stadium	Recap

== Regular season ==
=== Schedule ===
Week	Date	Opponent	Result	Record	Venue	Recap
1	September 8	San Diego Chargers	W 18–17	1–0	University of Phoenix Stadium	Recap
2	September 14	at New York Giants	W 25–14	2–0	MetLife Stadium	Recap
3	September 21	San Francisco 49ers	W 23–14	3–0	University of Phoenix Stadium	Recap
4	Bye					
5	October 5	at Denver Broncos	L 20–41	3–1	Sports Authority Field at Mile High	Recap
6	October 12	Washington Redskins	W 30–20	4–1	University of Phoenix Stadium	Recap
7	October 19	at Oakland Raiders	W 24–13	5–1	O.co Coliseum	Recap
8	October 26	Philadelphia Eagles	W 24–20	6–1	University of Phoenix Stadium	Recap
9	November 2	at Dallas Cowboys	W 28–17	7–1	AT&T Stadium	Recap
10	November 9	St. Louis Rams	W 31–14	8–1	University of Phoenix Stadium	Recap
11	November 16	Detroit Lions	W 14–6	9–1	University of Phoenix Stadium	Recap
12	November 23	at Seattle Seahawks	L 3–19	9–2	CenturyLink Field	Recap
13	November 30	at Atlanta Falcons	L 18–29	9–3	Georgia Dome	Recap
14	December 7	Kansas City Chiefs	W 17–14	10–3	University of Phoenix Stadium	Recap
15	December 11	at St. Louis Rams	W 12–6	11–3	Edward Jones Dome	Recap
16	December 21	Seattle Seahawks	L 6–35	11–4	University of Phoenix Stadium	Recap
17	December 28	at San Francisco 49ers	L 17–20	11–5	Levi's Stadium	Recap

== Game summaries ==
=== Regular season ===
==== Week 1: vs. San Diego Chargers ====
Week One: San Diego Chargers at Arizona Cardinals – Game summary

Quarter	1	2	3	4	Total
Chargers	0	3	14	0	17
Cardinals	0	6	0	12	18

at University of Phoenix Stadium, Glendale, Arizona

- Date: September 8
- Game time: 7:20 p.m.
- Game weather: Played indoors (retractable roof closed)
- Game attendance: 61,292
- Referee: Bill Vinovich
- TV announcers (ESPN): Chris Berman, Trent Dilfer and Lindsay Czarniak
- Recap, Gamebook

Game information

First quarter

- No scoring plays.

Second quarter

- ARI – Chandler Catanzaro 22-yard field goal, 12:42. Cardinals 3–0. Drive: 7 plays, 62 yards, 2:28.
- SDG – Nick Novak 36-yard field goal, 6:00. Tied 3–3. Drive: 4 plays, -1 yard, 1:18.
- ARI – Chandler Catanzaro 44-yard field goal, 0:00. Cardinals 6–0. Drive: 3 plays, 30 yards, 0:16.

Third quarter

- SDG – Malcolm Floyd 6-yard pass from Philip Rivers (Nick Novak kick), 11:38. Chargers 10–6. Drive: 7 plays, 80 yards, 3:22.
- SDG – Ryan Mathews 20-yard run (Nick Novak kick), 5:26. Chargers 17–6. Drive: 3 plays, 29 yards, 1:17.

Fourth quarter

- ARI – Stepfan Taylor 5-yard pass from Carson Palmer (run failed), 12:30. Chargers 17–12. Drive: 10 plays, 64 yards, 4:43.
- ARI – John Brown 13-yard pass from Carson Palmer (pass failed), 2:25. Cardinals 18–17. Drive: 11 plays, 91 yards, 4:25.

Top passers

- SD – Philip Rivers - 21/36, 238 Yds, 1 TD, 1 INT
- ARI – Carson Palmer - 24/37, 304 Yds, 2 TD

Top rushers

- SD – Ryan Mathews - 12 Car, 40 Yds, 1 TD
- ARI – Andre Ellington - 13 Car, 53 Yds

Top receivers

- SD – Antonio Gates - 6 Rec, 81 Yds
- ARI – Michael Floyd - 5 Rec, 119 Yds

Top tacklers

- SD – Shareece Wright - 8 Solo
- ARI – Larry Foote - 8 Solo

==== Week 2: at New York Giants ====
Week Two: Arizona Cardinals at New York Giants – Game summary

Quarter	1	2	3	4	Total
Cardinals	10	0	0	15	25
Giants	0	7	7	0	14

at MetLife Stadium, East Rutherford, New Jersey

- Date: September 14
- Game time: 1:00 pm. EDT/10:00 a.m.
- Game weather: 66 °F (19 °C), sunny
- Game attendance: 78,344
- Referee: John Parry
- TV announcers (Fox): Kevin Burkhardt, John Lynch and Pam Oliver
- Recap, Gamebook

Game information

First quarter

- ARI – Jonathan Dwyer 1-yard run (Chandler Catanzaro kick), 10:18. Cardinals 7–0. Drive: 11 plays, 80 yards, 4:42.
- ARI – Chandler Catanzaro 49-yard field goal, 1:31. Cardinals 10–0. Drive: 10 plays, 40 yards, 5:07.

Second quarter

- NYG – Rueben Randle 7-yard pass from Eli Manning (Josh Brown kick), 0:37. Cardinals 10–7. Drive: 13 plays, 90 yards, 7:13.

Third quarter

- NYG – Daniel Fells 1-yard pass from Eli Manning (Josh Brown kick), 2:03. Giants 14–10. Drive: 8 plays, 74 yards, 4:37.

Fourth quarter

- ARI – Chandler Catanzaro 37-yard field goal, 11:38. Giants 14–13. Drive: 13 plays, 74 yards, 5:25.
- ARI – Ted Ginn Jr. 71-yard punt return (run failed), 10:10. Cardinals 19–14.
- ARI – Chandler Catanzaro 32-yard field goal, 9:11. Cardinals 22–14. Drive: 4 plays, 7 yards, 0:51.
- ARI – Chandler Catanzaro 33-yard field goal, 1:13. Cardinals 25–14. Drive: 4 plays, 5 yards, 1:23.

Top passers

- ARI – Drew Stanton, 14/29, 167 Yds
- NYG – Eli Manning, 26/39, 277 Yds, 2 TD, 2 INT

Top rushers

- ARI – Andre Ellington, 15 Car, 91 Yds
- NYG – Rashad Jennings, 18 Car, 64 Yds

Top receivers

- ARI – Larry Fitzgerald, 6 Rec, 51 Yds
- NYG – Larry Donnell, 7 Rec, 81 Yds

Top tacklers

- ARI – Calais Campbell, 10 solo
- NYG – Prince Amukamara, 9 solo

Drew Stanton started in place of an injured Carson Palmer, who was held out of the game with a nerve issue. Ted Ginn Jr. returned a Giants punt 71 yards for a touchdown, the first punt return for a touchdown since Patrick Peterson's 80-yard punt return touchdown in 2011.

==== Week 3: vs. San Francisco 49ers ====
Week Three: San Francisco 49ers at Arizona Cardinals – Game summary

Quarter	1	2	3	4	Total
49ers	7	7	0	0	14
Cardinals	3	3	14	3	23

at University of Phoenix Stadium, Glendale, Arizona

- Date: September 21
- Game time: 1:05 p.m.
- Game weather: Played indoors (retractable roof closed)
- Game attendance: 61,572
- Referee: Gene Steratore
- TV announcers (Fox): Thom Brennaman, David Diehl and Laura Okmin
- Recap, Gamebook

Game information

First quarter

- ARI – Chandler Catanzaro 51-yard field goal, 12:23. Cardinals 3–0. Drive: 7 plays, 47 yards, 2:37.
- SFO – Michael Crabtree 2-yard pass from Colin Kaepernick (Phil Dawson kick), 6:45. 49ers 7–3. Drive: 12 plays, 80 yards, 5:38.

Second quarter

- ARI – Chandler Catanzaro 32-yard field goal, 13:42. 49ers 7–6. Drive: 17 plays, 66 yards, 8:03.
- SFO – Carlos Hyde 6-yard run (Phil Dawson kick), 5:07. 49ers 14–6. Drive: 14 plays, 80 yards, 8:35.

Third quarter

- ARI – John Brown 24-yard pass from Drew Stanton (Chandler Catanzaro kick), 9:20. 49ers 14–13. Drive: 7 plays, 85 yards, 2:46.
- ARI – John Brown 21-yard pass from Drew Stanton (Chandler Catanzaro kick), 4:39. Cardinals 20–14. Drive: 5 plays, 66 yards, 2:53.

Fourth quarter

- ARI – Chandler Catanzaro 35-yard field goal, 0:29. Cardinals 23–14. Drive: 9 plays, 41 yards, 3:28.

Top passers

- SF – Colin Kaepernick, 29/37, 245 Yds, 1 TD
- ARI – Drew Stanton, 18/33, 244 Yds, 2 TD

Top rushers

- SF – Colin Kaepernick, 12 Car, 54 Yds
- ARI – Andre Ellington, 18 Car, 62 Yds

Top receivers

- SF – Michael Crabtree, 10 Rec, 80 Yds, 1 TD
- ARI – Michael Floyd, 5 Rec, 114 Yds

Top tacklers

- SF – Patrick Willis Michael Wilhoite, 6 Solo
- ARI – Tony Jefferson, 10 Solo

==== Week 5: at Denver Broncos ====
Week Five: Arizona Cardinals at Denver Broncos – Game summary

Quarter	1	2	3	4	Total
Cardinals	6	7	7	0	20
Broncos	7	14	3	17	41

at Sports Authority Field at Mile High, Denver, Colorado

- Date: October 5
- Game time: 2:05 pm. MDT/1:05 p.m.
- Game weather: 71 °F (22 °C), sunny
- Game attendance: 76,895
- Referee: Bill Leavy
- TV announcers (Fox): Joe Buck, Troy Aikman and Erin Andrews
- Recap, Game book

Game information

First quarter

- ARI – Chandler Catanzaro 33-yard field goal, 9:09. Cardinals 3–0. Drive: 12 plays, 65 yards, 5:51.
- DEN – Julius Thomas 7-yard pass from Peyton Manning (Brandon McManus kick), 4:43. Broncos 7–3. Drive: 12 plays, 80 yards, 4:26.
- ARI – Chandler Catanzaro 48-yard field goal, 1:41. Broncos 7–6. Drive: 10 plays, 50 yards, 3:02.

Second quarter

- DEN – Demaryius Thomas 31-yard pass from Peyton Manning (Brandon McManus kick), 7:30. Broncos 14–6. Drive: 7 plays, 80 yards, 3:13.
- ARI – Andre Ellington 5-yard run (Chandler Catanzaro kick), 4:37. Broncos 14–13. Drive: 1 play, 5 yards, 0:05.
- DEN – Demaryius Thomas 86-yard pass from Peyton Manning (Brandon McManus kick), 1:37. Broncos 21–13. Drive: 1 play, 86 yards, 0:11.

Third quarter

- DEN – Brandon McManus 44-yard field goal, 9:33. Broncos 24–13. Drive: 7 plays, 45 yards, 2:32.
- ARI – Andre Ellington 81-yard pass from Logan Thomas (Chandler Catanzaro kick), 3:03. Broncos 24–20. Drive: 1 play, 81 yards, 0:13.

Fourth quarter

- DEN – Brandon McManus 41-yard field goal, 13:48. Broncos 27–20. Drive: 8 plays, 57 yards, 4:15.
- DEN – Julius Thomas 12-yard pass from Peyton Manning (Brandon McManus kick), 7:47. Broncos 34–20. Drive: 8 plays, 80 yards, 4:33.
- DEN – Juwan Thompson 8-yard run (Brandon McManus kick), 4:33. Broncos 41–20. Drive: 5 plays, 46 yards, 2:07.

Top passers

- ARI – Drew Stanton, 11/26, 118 Yds
- DEN – Peyton Manning, 31/47, 479 Yds, 4 TD, 2 INT

Top rushers

- ARI – Andre Ellington, 16 Car, 32 Yds, 1 TD
- DEN – Ronnie Hillman, 15 Car, 64 Yds

Top receivers

- ARI – Andre Ellington, 4 Rec, 112 Yds, 1 TD
- DEN – Demaryius Thomas, 8 Rec, 226 Yds, 2 TD

Top tacklers

- ARI – Jerraud Powers, 7 Solo
- DEN – Danny Trevathan, 7 Solo

The Cardinals had no answers for the Denver Broncos offense led by Peyton Manning. Drew Stanton, making his third start at QB in a row due to Carson Palmer's lingering nerve issue, was knocked out of the game with a concussion in the third quarter. Third string quarterback Logan Thomas would enter the game in relief and throw the only touchdown pass of his career, 81 yards to Andre Ellington. Multiple Cardinals defensive starters left the game with injuries, including star DE Calais Campbell on an illegal chop block from Broncos tight end Julius Thomas. Ultimately, the Cardinals surrendered a total of 568 offensive yards to Denver, which was the most allowed in franchise history since 1973, when they were based in St. Louis.

==== Week 6: vs. Washington Redskins ====
Week Six: Washington Redskins at Arizona Cardinals – Game summary

Quarter	1	2	3	4	Total
Redskins	0	13	0	7	20
Cardinals	7	7	3	13	30

at University of Phoenix Stadium, Glendale, Arizona

- Date: October 12
- Game time: 1:25 p.m.
- Game weather: Played indoors (retractable roof closed)
- Game attendance: 61,139
- Referee: Ed Hochuli
- TV announcers (Fox): Dick Stockton, Brady Quinn and Kris Budden
- Recap, Gamebook

Game information

First quarter

- ARI – Michael Floyd 20-yard pass from Carson Palmer (Chandler Catanzaro kick), 3:08. Cardinals 7–0. Drive: 5 plays, 41 yards, 2:13.

Second quarter

- WAS – DeSean Jackson 64-yard pass from Kirk Cousins (Kai Forbath kick), 14:03. Tied 7–7. Drive: 7 plays, 82 yards, 4:05.
- WAS – Kai Forbath 28-yard field goal, 8:20. Redskins 10–7. Drive: 10 plays, 60 yards, 4:09.
- ARI – Larry Fitzgerald 24-yard pass from Carson Palmer (Chandler Catanzaro kick), 0:31. Cardinals 14–10. Drive: 8 plays, 85 yards, 2:18.
- WAS – Kai Forbath 43-yard field goal, 0:02. Cardinals 14–13. Drive: 4 plays, 55 yards, 0:29.

Third quarter

- ARI – Chandler Catanzaro 33-yard field goal, 4:13. Cardinals 17–13. Drive: 14 plays, 69 yards, 7:23.

Fourth quarter

- ARI – Chandler Catanzaro 49-yard field goal, 12:54. Cardinals 20–13. Drive: 8 plays, 39 yards, 4:50.
- ARI – Chandler Catanzaro 37-yard field goal, 10:27. Cardinals 23–13. Drive: 6 plays, 8 yards, 2:13.
- WAS – Pierre Garcon 5-yard pass from Kirk Cousins (Kai Forbath kick), 2:17. Cardinals 23–20. Drive: 4 plays, 64 yards, 1:26.
- ARI – Rashad Johnson 28-yard interception return (Chandler Catanzaro kick), 0:18. Cardinals 30–20.

Top passers

- WAS – Kirk Cousins, 24/38, 354 Yds, 2 TD, 3 INT
- ARI – Carson Palmer, 28/44, 250 Yds, 2 TD

Top rushers

- WAS – Alfred Morris, 13 Car, 41 Yds
- ARI – Andre Ellington, 19 Car, 67 Yds

Top receivers

- WAS – DeSean Jackson, 3 Rec, 115 Yds, 1 TD
- ARI – Larry Fitzgerald, 6 Rec, 98 Yds, 1 TD

Top tacklers

- WAS – Ryan Kerrigan, 9 Solo
- ARI – Rashad Johnson, 8 Solo

The win ended the Cardinals' eight-game losing streak against the Redskins, beating them for the first time since the 2000 season, when both teams were members of the NFC East.

==== Week 7: at Oakland Raiders ====
Week Seven: Arizona Cardinals at Oakland Raiders – Game summary

Quarter	1	2	3	4	Total
Cardinals	7	7	7	3	24
Raiders	0	10	3	0	13

at O.co Coliseum, Oakland, California

- Date: October 19
- Game time: 1:25 p.m.
- Game weather: 69 °F (21 °C), sunny
- Game attendance: 52,101
- Referee: Clete Blakeman
- TV announcers (Fox): Dick Stockton, Brady Quinn and Kristina Pink
- Recap, Gamebook

Game information

First quarter

- ARI – Stepfan Taylor 2-yard pass from Carson Palmer (Chandler Catanzaro kick), 1:47. Cardinals 7–0. Drive: 11 plays, 88 yards, 7:08.

Second quarter

- ARI – Michael Floyd 33-yard pass from Carson Palmer (Chandler Catanzaro kick), 5:37. Cardinals 14–0. Drive: 4 plays, 50 yards, 1:53.
- OAK – Darren McFadden 1-yard run (Sebastian Janikowski kick), 1:56. Cardinals 14–7. Drive: 8 plays, 79 yards, 3:41.
- OAK – Sebastian Janikowski 29-yard field goal, 0:45. Cardinals 14–10. Drive: 4 plays, 2 yards, 0:55.

Third quarter

- OAK – Sebastian Janikowski 53-yard field goal, 7:17. Cardinals 14–13. Drive: 9 plays, 49 yards, 4:24.
- ARI – Stepfan Taylor 4-yard run (Chandler Catanzaro kick), 2:55. Cardinals 21–13. Drive: 8 plays, 80 yards, 4:22.

Fourth quarter

- ARI – Chandler Catanzaro 41-yard field goal, 0:29. Cardinals 24–13. Drive: 12 plays, 50 yards, 6:53.

Top passers

- ARI – Carson Palmer, 22/31, 253 Yds, 2 TD, 1 INT
- OAK – Derek Carr, 16/28, 173 Yds

Top rushers

- ARI – Stepfan Taylor, 12 Car, 40 Yds, 1 TD
- OAK – Darren McFadden, 14 Car, 48 Yds, 1 TD

Top receivers

- ARI – Michael Floyd, 3 Rec, 47 Yds, 1 TD
- OAK – Brice Butler, 1 Rec, 55 Yds

Top tacklers

- ARI – Larry Foote, 4 Solo, 1.0 Sack
- OAK – Khalil Mack, 11 Solo

Carson Palmer returned to Oakland to play the Raiders for the first time since he was traded away at the beginning of the 2013 season. While he did throw the first interception of the season, the Cardinals were still able to prevail and keep the Raiders winless on the season.

==== Week 8: vs. Philadelphia Eagles ====
Week Eight: Philadelphia Eagles at Arizona Cardinals – Game summary

Quarter	1	2	3	4	Total
Eagles	7	0	10	3	20
Cardinals	0	7	7	10	24

at University of Phoenix Stadium, Glendale, Arizona

- Date: October 26
- Game time: 1:05 p.m.
- Game weather: Played indoors (retractable roof closed)
- Game attendance: 61,789
- Referee: Walt Anderson
- TV announcers (Fox): Chris Myers, Ronde Barber and Jennifer Hale
- Recap, Gamebook

Game information

First quarter

- PHI – Jeremy Maclin 21-yard pass from Nick Foles (Cody Parkey kick), 4:39. Eagles 7–0. Drive: 9 plays, 80 yards, 4:10.

Second quarter

- ARI – Andre Ellington 1-yard run (Chandler Catanzaro kick), 13:45. Tied 7–7. Drive: 13 plays, 80 yards, 5:54.

Third quarter

- ARI – Larry Fitzgerald 80-yard pass from Carson Palmer (Chandler Catanzaro kick), 14:07. Cardinals 14–7. Drive: 3 plays, 80 yards, 0:53.
- PHI – Cody Parkey 54-yard field goal, 7:19. Cardinals 14–10. Drive: 6 plays, 20 yards, 1:50.
- PHI – Jeremy Maclin 54-yard pass from Nick Foles (Cody Parkey kick), 2:22. Eagles 17–14. Drive: 1 play, 54 yards, 0:09.

Fourth quarter

- ARI – Chandler Catanzaro 28-yard field goal, 9:01. Tied 17–17. Drive: 9 plays, 30 yards, 3:19.
- PHI – Cody Parkey 20-yard field goal, 1:56. Eagles 20–17. Drive: 12 plays, 78 yards, 7:05.
- ARI – John Brown 75-yard pass from Carson Palmer (Chandler Catanzaro kick), 1:21. Cardinals 24–20. Drive: 3 plays, 80 yards, 0:35.

Top passers

- PHI – Nick Foles, 36/62, 411 Yds, 2 TD, 2 INT
- ARI – Carson Palmer, 20/42, 329 Yds, 2 TD

Top rushers

- PHI – LeSean McCoy, 20 Car, 83 Yds
- ARI – Andre Ellington, 23 Car, 71 Yds, 1 TD

Top receivers

- PHI – Jeremy Maclin, 12 Rec, 187 Yds, 2 TD
- ARI – Larry Fitzgerald, 7 Rec, 160 Yds, 1 TD

Top tacklers

- PHI – Malcolm Jenkins, 5 Solo
- ARI – Tony Jefferson, 12 Solo

==== Week 9: at Dallas Cowboys ====
Week Nine: Arizona Cardinals at Dallas Cowboys – Game summary

Quarter	1	2	3	4	Total
Cardinals	0	14	0	14	28
Cowboys	10	0	0	7	17

at AT&T Stadium, Arlington, Texas

- Date: November 2
- Game time: 12:00 pm. CST/11:00 a.m. MST
- Game weather: 57 °F (14 °C), cloudy (retractable roof open)
- Game attendance: 85,688
- Referee: Craig Wrolstad
- TV announcers (Fox): Joe Buck, Troy Aikman and Erin Andrews
- Recap, Gamebook

Game information

First quarter

- DAL – Tyler Patmon 58-yard interception return (Dan Bailey kick), 10:55. Cowboys 7–0.
- DAL – Dan Bailey 52-yard field goal, 4:03. Cowboys 10–0. Drive: 10 plays, 49 yards, 4:45.

Second quarter

- ARI – John Carlson 7-yard pass from Carson Palmer (Chandler Catanzaro kick), 12:39. Cowboys 10–7. Drive: 13 plays, 80 yards, 6:24.
- ARI – Jaron Brown 11-yard pass from Carson Palmer (Chandler Catanzaro kick), 4:34. Cardinals 14–10. Drive: 8 plays, 63 yards, 2:48.

Third quarter

- No scoring plays

Fourth quarter

- ARI – Andre Ellington 1-yard pass from Carson Palmer (Chandler Catanzaro kick), 6:00. Cardinals 21–10. Drive: 9 plays, 65 yards, 3:36.
- ARI – Marion Grice 1-yard run (Chandler Catanzaro kick), 4:20. Cardinals 28–10. Drive: 5 plays, 28 yards, 1:05.
- DAL – Dez Bryant 3-yard pass from Brandon Weeden (Dan Bailey kick), 1:08. Cardinals 28–17. Drive: 12 plays, 87 yards, 3:12.

Top passers

- ARI – Carson Palmer, 22/34, 249 Yds, 3 TD, 1 INT
- DAL – Brandon Weeden, 18/33, 183 Yds, 1 TD, 2 INT

Top rushers

- ARI – Andre Ellington, 21 Car, 95 Yds
- DAL – DeMarco Murray, 19 Car, 79 Yds

Top receivers

- ARI – Larry Fitzgerald, 5 Rec, 70 Yds
- DAL – Jason Witten, 6 Rec, 62 Yds

Top tacklers

- ARI – Dan Williams, 7 Solo, 1.0 Sack
- DAL – Anthony Hitchens, 8 Solo

==== Week 10: vs. St. Louis Rams ====
Week Ten: St. Louis Rams at Arizona Cardinals – Game summary

Quarter	1	2	3	4	Total
Rams	7	7	0	0	14
Cardinals	0	10	0	21	31

at University of Phoenix Stadium, Glendale, Arizona

- Date: November 9
- Game time: 2:25 pm. MST
- Game weather: Played indoors (retractable roof closed)
- Game attendance: 61,363
- Referee: Ron Torbert
- TV announcers (Fox): Chris Myers, Ronde Barber, Matt Hasselbeck and Jennifer Hale
- Recap, Gamebook

Game information

First quarter

- STL – Benny Cunningham 3-yard run (Greg Zuerlein kick), 4:35. Rams 7–0. Drive: 7 plays, 62 yards, 4:12.

Second quarter

- ARI – Andre Ellington 3-yard run (Chandler Catanzaro kick), 11:33. Tied 7–7. Drive: 8 plays, 66 yards, 3:41.
- ARI – Chandler Catanzaro 43-yard field goal, 4:52. Cardinals 10–7. Drive: 11 plays, 36 yards, 4:29.
- STL – Jared Cook 59-yard pass from Austin Davis (Greg Zuerlein kick), 1:50. Rams 14–10. Drive: 5 plays, 80 yards, 3:02.

Third quarter

- No scoring plays

Fourth quarter

- ARI – John Brown 48-yard pass from Drew Stanton (Chandler Catanzaro kick), 7:40. Cardinals 17–14. Drive: 4 plays, 89 yards, 2:05.
- ARI – Patrick Peterson 30-yard interception return (Chandler Catanzaro kick), 5:13. Cardinals 24–14.
- ARI – Antonio Cromartie 14-yard fumble return (Chandler Catanzaro kick), 3:58. Cardinals 31-14.

Top passers

- STL – Austin Davis, 17/30, 216 Yds, 1 TD, 2 INT
- ARI – Carson Palmer, 25/36, 241 Yds, 1 INT

Top rushers

- STL – Tre Mason, 14 Car, 48 Yds
- ARI – Andre Ellington, 18 Car, 23 Yds, 1 TD

Top receivers

- STL – Jared Cook, 2 Rec, 84 Yds, 1 TD
- ARI – John Brown, 5 Rec, 73 Yds, 1 TD

Top tacklers

- STL – T.J. McDonald, 9 Solo, 1.0 Sack
- ARI – Larry Foote, 7 Solo

Carson Palmer would suffer a season-ending injury on his left-knee. Drew Stanton would take over as quarterback for the rest of the game. Thanks to the efforts of the defense during the fourth quarter, the Cardinals rallied to beat the Rams 31-14.

==== Week 11: vs. Detroit Lions ====
Week Eleven: Detroit Lions at Arizona Cardinals – Game summary

Quarter	1	2	3	4	Total
Lions	3	3	0	0	6
Cardinals	14	0	0	0	14

at University of Phoenix Stadium, Glendale, Arizona

- Date: November 16
- Game time: 2:25 pm. MST
- Game weather: Played indoors (retractable roof closed)
- Game attendance: 62,487
- Referee: Jerome Boger
- TV announcers (Fox): Chris Myers, Ronde Barber and Jennifer Hale
- Recap, Gamebook

Game information

First quarter

- ARI – Michael Floyd 42-yard pass from Drew Stanton (Chandler Catanzaro kick), 12:02. Cardinals 7–0. Drive: 6 plays, 80 yards, 2:58.
- ARI – Michael Floyd 12-yard pass from Drew Stanton (Chandler Catanzaro kick), 6:06. Cardinals 14-0. Drive: 7 plays, 77 yards, 3:42.
- DET – Matt Prater 50-yard field goal, 2:46. Cardinals 14-3. Drive: 6 plays, 48 yards, 3:20.

Second quarter

- DET – Matt Prater 28-yard field goal, 0:25. Cardinals 14–6. Drive: 4 plays, 9 yards, 1:27.

Third quarter

- No scoring plays

Fourth quarter

- No scoring plays

Top passers

- DET – Matthew Stafford, 18/30, 183 Yds, 1 INT
- ARI – Drew Stanton, 21/32, 306 Yds, 2 TD, 2 INT

Top rushers

- DET – Joique Bell, 14 Car, 85 Yds
- ARI – Andre Ellington, 19 Car, 42 Yds

Top receivers

- DET – Calvin Johnson, 5 Rec, 59 Yds
- ARI – Michael Floyd, 2 Rec, 54 Yds, 2 TD

Top tacklers

- DET – DeAndre Levy, 10 Solo
- ARI – Deone Bucannon, 8 Solo

==== Week 12: at Seattle Seahawks ====
Week Twelve: Arizona Cardinals at Seattle Seahawks – Game summary

Quarter	1	2	3	4	Total
Cardinals	0	3	0	0	3
Seahawks	3	6	10	0	19

at CenturyLink Field, Seattle, Washington

- Date: November 23
- Game time: 2:05 pm. MST/1:05 pm. PST
- Game weather: 51 °F (11 °C), sunny
- Game attendance: 68,327
- Referee: Gene Steratore
- TV announcers (Fox): Kevin Burkhardt, John Lynch and Pam Oliver
- Recap, Gamebook

Game information

First quarter

- SEA – Stephen Hauschka 27-yard field goal, 8:45. Seahawks 3–0. Drive: 9 plays, 40 yards, 4:40.

Second quarter

- SEA – Stephen Hauschka 32-yard field goal, 12:52. Seahawks 6–0. Drive: 5 plays, 42 yards, 2:38.
- SEA – Stephen Hauschka 52-yard field goal, 10:09. Seahawks 9–0. Drive: 5 plays, 14 yards, 1:52.
- ARI – Chandler Catanzaro 23-yard field goal, 0:14. Seahawks 9-3. Drive: 15 plays, 74 yards, 5:14.

Third quarter

- SEA – Stephen Hauschka 40-yard field goal, 8:34. Seahawks 12–3. Drive: 4 plays, 2 yards, 2:30.
- SEA – Cooper Helfet 20-yard pass from Russell Wilson (Stephen Hauschka kick), 0:52. Seahawks 19–3. Drive: 9 plays, 75 yards, 5:41.

Fourth quarter

- No scoring plays

Top passers

- ARI – Drew Stanton, 14/26, 149 Yds, 1 INT
- SEA – Russell Wilson, 17/22, 211 Yds, 1 TD

Top rushers

- ARI – Andre Ellington, 10 Car, 24 Yds
- SEA – Marshawn Lynch, 15 Car, 39 Yds

Top receivers

- ARI – John Brown, 3 Rec, 61 Yds
- SEA – Cooper Helfet, 2 Rec, 27 Yds, 1 TD

Top tacklers

- ARI – Rashad Johnson, 9 Solo
- SEA – Kam Chancellor, 8 Solo

==== Week 13: at Atlanta Falcons ====
Week Thirteen: Arizona Cardinals at Atlanta Falcons – Game summary

Quarter	1	2	3	4	Total
Cardinals	0	10	0	8	18
Falcons	17	3	3	6	29

at Georgia Dome, Atlanta, Georgia

- Date: November 30
- Game time: 4:05 pm. EST/2:05 pm. MST
- Game weather: Played indoors (dome stadium)
- Game attendance: 69,557
- Referee: Terry McAulay
- TV announcers (Fox): Kevin Burkhardt, John Lynch and Pam Oliver
- Recap, Gamebook

Game information

First quarter

- ATL – Levine Toilolo 1-yard pass from Matt Ryan (Matt Bryant kick), 11:39. Falcons 7–0. Drive: 8 plays, 71 yards, 3:21.
- ATL – Matt Bryant 20-yard field goal, 8:13. Falcons 10–0. Drive: 6 plays, 30 yards, 2:20.
- ATL – Julio Jones 32-yard pass from Matt Ryan (Matt Bryant kick), 5:48. Falcons 17–0. Drive: 2 plays, 32 yards, 0:39.

Second quarter

- ARI – Rashad Johnson 88-yard interception return (Chandler Catanzaro kick), 14:07. Falcons 17–7.
- ARI – Chandler Catanzaro 44-yard field goal, 2:42. Falcons 17–10. Drive: 8 plays, 54 yards, 3:56.
- ATL – Matt Bryant 23-yard field goal, 0:00. Falcons 20-10. Drive: 12 plays, 68 yards, 2:42.

Third quarter

- ATL – Matt Bryant 21-yard field goal, 6:13. Falcons 23-10. Drive: 10 plays, 85 yards, 2:42.

Fourth quarter

- ATL – Matt Bryant 45-yard field goal, 12:35. Falcons 26–10. Drive: 9 plays, 59 yards, 5:11.
- ATL – Matt Bryant 28-yard field goal, 2:30. Falcons 29–10. Drive: 11 plays, 44 yards, 4:47.
- ARI – Stepfan Taylor 3-yard pass from Drew Stanton (Stepfan Taylor run), 1:05. Falcons 29-18. Drive: 7 plays, 80 yards, 1:25.

Top passers

- ARI – Drew Stanton, 24/39, 294 Yds, 1 TD, 2 INT
- ATL – Matt Ryan, 30/41, 361 Yds, 2 TD, 1 INT

Top rushers

- ARI – Marion Grice, 5 Car, 16 Yds
- ATL – Steven Jackson, 18 Car, 101 Yds

Top receivers

- ARI – Jaron Brown, 7 Rec, 75 Yds
- ATL – Julio Jones, 10 Rec, 189 Yds, 1 TD

Top tacklers

- ARI – Larry Foote, 11 Solo
- ATL – Paul Worrilow, 8 Solo

==== Week 14: vs. Kansas City Chiefs ====
Week Fourteen: Kansas City Chiefs at Arizona Cardinals – Game summary

Quarter	1	2	3	4	Total
Chiefs	7	7	0	0	14
Cardinals	3	3	11	0	17

at University of Phoenix Stadium, Glendale, Arizona

- Date: December 7
- Game time: 2:05 pm. MST
- Game weather: Played indoors (retractable roof closed)
- Game attendance: 62,387
- Referee: Craig Wrolstad
- TV announcers (CBS): Greg Gumbel, Trent Green and Evan Washburn
- Recap, Gamebook

Game information

First quarter

- ARI – Chandler Catanzaro 44-yard field goal, 10:55. Cardinals 3–0. Drive: 8 plays, 36 yards, 4:05.
- KC – Jamaal Charles 63-yard run (Cairo Santos kick), 9:35. Chiefs 7–3. Drive: 3 plays, 78 yards, 1:20.

Second quarter

- ARI – Chandler Catanzaro 33-yard field goal, 7:43. Chiefs 7–6. Drive: 16 plays, 65 yards, 8:07.
- KC – Jamaal Charles 18-yard pass from Alex Smith (Cairo Santos kick), 1:12. Chiefs 14–6. Drive: 11 plays, 66 yards, 6:31.

Third quarter

- ARI – Chandler Catanzaro 39-yard field goal, 9:02. Chiefs 14–9. Drive: 6 plays, 40 yards, 1:16.
- ARI – Jaron Brown 26-yard pass from Drew Stanton (Drew Stanton-John Carlson pass), 3:32. Cardinals 17–14. Drive: 5 plays, 42 yards, 2:00.

Fourth quarter

- No scoring plays.

Top passers

- KC – Alex Smith – 26/39, 293 Yds, 1 TD, 1 INT
- ARI – Drew Stanton – 15/30, 239 Yds, 1 TD

Top rushers

- KC – Jamaal Charles – 10 Car, 91 Yds, 1 TD
- ARI – Kerwynn Williams – 19 Car, 100 Yds

Top receivers

- KC – Travis Kelce – 7 Rec, 110 Yds
- ARI – Jaron Brown – 2 Rec, 48 Yds, 1 TD

Top tacklers

- KC – Ron Parker – 9 tackles, 1 assist
- ARI – Patrick Peterson – 8 tackles, 1.0 sack

==== Week 15: at St. Louis Rams ====
Week Fifteen: Arizona Cardinals at St. Louis Rams – Game summary

Quarter	1	2	3	4	Total
Cardinals	0	6	3	3	12
Rams	3	0	0	3	6

at Edward Jones Dome, St. Louis, Missouri

- Date: December 11
- Game time: 7:25 pm. CST/6:25 pm. MST
- Game weather: Played indoors (dome stadium)
- Game attendance: 55,880
- Referee: Walt Coleman
- TV announcers (NFLN): Jim Nantz, Phil Simms and Tracy Wolfson
- Recap, Gamebook

Game information

First quarter

- STL – Greg Zuerlein 24-yard field goal, 6:57. Rams 3–0. Drive: 8 plays, 48 yards, 4:43.

Second quarter

- ARI – Chandler Catanzaro 23-yard field goal, 13:36. Tied 3–3. Drive: 7 plays, 22 yards, 3:21.
- ARI – Chandler Catanzaro 44-yard field goal, 8:25. Cardinals 6–3. Drive: 8 plays, 59 yards, 2:22.

Third quarter

- ARI – Chandler Catanzaro 51-yard field goal, 7:23. Cardinals 9–3. Drive: 6 plays, 37 yards, 3:26.

Fourth quarter

- ARI – Chandler Catanzaro 46-yard field goal, 10:48. Cardinals 12–3. Drive: 9 plays, 44 yards, 4:02.
- STL – Greg Zuerlein 19-yard field goal, 6:07. Cardinals 12–6. Drive: 9 plays, 66 yards, 4:41.

Top passers

- ARI – Drew Stanton, 12/20, 109 Yds
- STL – Shaun Hill, 20/39, 229 Yds, 1 INT

Top rushers

- ARI – Kerwynn Williams, 15 Car, 75 Yds
- STL – Tre Mason, 13 Car, 33 Yds

Top receivers

- ARI – Michael Floyd, 2 Rec, 55 Yds
- STL – Stedman Bailey, 5 Rec, 74 Yds

Top tacklers

- ARI – Jerraud Powers, 5 Solo, 2 Assist
- STL – Janoris Jenkins, 7 Solo, 1 Assist

In a rematch against the team that had knocked starting QB Carson Palmer out for the season in week 10, the Cardinals lost backup QB Drew Stanton for the season in the third quarter. Third string QB Ryan Lindley came into the game but was largely ineffective in moving the ball. Ultimately the Cardinals' defense prevailed and held on for the win. Despite the apparent loss of their QB, the Cardinals were able to clinch a playoff berth with their win and the Eagles' loss to the Cowboys later that night.

==== Week 16: vs. Seattle Seahawks ====
Week Sixteen: Seattle Seahawks at Arizona Cardinals – Game summary

Quarter	1	2	3	4	Total
Seahawks	0	14	0	21	35
Cardinals	0	3	3	0	6

at University of Phoenix Stadium, Glendale, Arizona

- Date: December 21
- Game time: 6:30 pm. MST
- Game weather: Played indoors (retractable roof closed)
- Game attendance: 63,806
- Referee: Walt Anderson
- TV announcers (NBC): Al Michaels, Cris Collinsworth and Michele Tafoya
- Recap, Gamebook

Game information

First quarter

- No scoring plays

Second quarter

- ARI – Chandler Catanzaro 27-yard field goal, 7:55. Cardinals 3–0. 'Drive:
- SEA – Luke Willson 80-yard pass from Russell Wilson (Stephen Hauschka kick), 7:55. Seahawks 7–3. 'Drive:
- SEA – Marshawn Lynch 6-yard run (Stephen Hauschka kick), 3:41. Seahawks 14–3. 'Drive:

Third quarter

- ARI – Chandler Catanzaro 32-yard field goal, 0:59. Seahawks 14–6. 'Drive:

Fourth quarter

- SEA – Luke Willson 20-yard pass from Russell Wilson (Stephen Hauschka kick), 11:59. Seahawks 21–6. 'Drive:
- SEA – Marshawn Lynch 79-yard run (Stephen Hauschka kick), 10:14. Seahawks 28–6. 'Drive:
- SEA – Russell Wilson 5-yard run (Stephen Hauschka kick), 4:40. Seahawks 35–6. 'Drive:

Top passers

- SEA – Russell Wilson, 20/31, 339 Yds, 2 TD
- ARI – Ryan Lindley, 18/44, 1 INT

Top rushers

- SEA – Marshawn Lynch, 10 Car, 113 Yds, 2 TD
- ARI – Stepfan Taylor, 11 Car, 19 Yds

Top receivers

- SEA – Luke Willson, 3 Rec, 139 Yds, 2 TD
- ARI – John Brown, 3 Rec, 54 Yds

Top tacklers

- SEA – Bobby Wagner, 8 Solo, 1 Assist
- ARI – Rashad Johnson, 7 Solo, 1 Assist

==== Week 17: at San Francisco 49ers ====
Week Seventeen: Arizona Cardinals at San Francisco 49ers – Game summary

Quarter	1	2	3	4	Total
Cardinals	7	10	0	0	17
49ers	7	6	7	0	20

at Levi's Stadium, Santa Clara, California

- Date: December 28
- Game time: 2:25 pm. MST/1:25 pm. PST
- Game weather: 51 °F (11 °C), sunny
- Game attendance: 70,699
- Referee: Carl Cheffers
- TV announcers (Fox): Thom Brennaman, David Diehl and Laura Okmin
- Recap, Gamebook

Game information

First quarter

- ARI – Michael Floyd 20-yard pass from Ryan Lindley (Chandler Catanzaro kick), 10:55. Cardinals 7–0. Drive: 8 plays, 80 yards, 4:05.
- SFO – Anquan Boldin 76-yard pass from Colin Kaepernick (Phil Dawson kick), 9:24. Tied 7–7. Drive: 3 plays, 78 yards, 1:31.

Second quarter

- SFO – Phil Dawson 53-yard field goal, 12:33. 49ers 10–7. Drive: 13 plays, 55 yards, 5:55.
- SFO – Phil Dawson 37-yard field goal, 6:04. 49ers 13–7. Drive: 8 plays, 56 yards, 3:00.
- ARI – Chandler Catanzaro 36-yard field goal, 1:35. 49ers 13–10. Drive: 12 plays, 72 yards, 4:29.
- ARI – Michael Floyd 41-yard pass from Ryan Lindley (Chandler Catanzaro kick), 0:36. Cardinals 17–13. Drive: 4 plays, 75 yards, 0:22.

Third quarter

- SFO – Bruce Miller 3-yard pass from Colin Kaepernick (Phil Dawson kick), 0:25. 49ers 20–17. Drive: 10 plays, 82 yards, 5:43.

Fourth quarter

- No scoring plays

Top passers

- ARI – Ryan Lindley, 23/39, 316 Yds, 2 TD, 3 INT
- SF – Colin Kaepernick, 15/26, 204 Yds, 2 TD

Top rushers

- ARI – Kerwynn Williams, 17 Car, 67 Yds
- SF – Frank Gore, 25 Car, 144 Yds

Top receivers

- ARI – Michael Floyd, 8 Rec, 153 Yds, 2 TD
- SF – Anquan Boldin, 2 Rec, 81 Yds, 1 TD

Top tacklers

- ARI – Glenn Carson, 6 Solo, 3 Assist
- SF – Craig Dahl, 10 Solo

This would snap the 49ers' 4-game losing streak in Levi's Stadium. With the loss, the Cardinals finished their season at 11-5. With the loss to the 49ers, the Cardinals were officially designated as a wild-card team for the playoffs.

=== Postseason ===
Round	Date	Opponent (seed)	Result	Record	Venue	Recap
Wild Card	January 3, 2015	at Carolina Panthers (4)	L 16–27	0–1	Bank of America Stadium	Recap

==== NFC Wild Card Playoffs: at #4 Carolina Panthers ====
NFC Wild Card Playoffs: (#5) Arizona Cardinals at (#4) Carolina Panthers – Game summary

Quarter	1	2	3	4	Total
Cardinals	0	14	0	2	16
Panthers	10	3	14	0	27

at Bank of America Stadium, Charlotte, North Carolina

- Date: January 3, 2015
- Game time: 2:35 p.m. MST
- Game weather: 51 °F (11 °C), rain
- Game attendance: 71,849
- Referee: Ed Hochuli
- TV announcers (ESPN): Mike Tirico, Jon Gruden and Lisa Salters
- Recap, Gamebook

Game information

First quarter

- CAR – Graham Gano 47-yard field goal, 11:27. Panthers 3–0. Drive: 7 plays, 19 yards, 2:03.
- CAR – Jonathan Stewart 13-yard run (Graham Gano kick), 5:21. Panthers 10–0. Drive: 8 plays, 57 yards, 3:51.

Second quarter

- ARI – Darren Fells 1-yard pass from Ryan Lindley (Chandler Catanzaro kick), 14:56. Panthers 10–7. Drive: 6 plays, 30 yards, 2:15.
- ARI – Marion Grice 1-yard run (Chandler Catanzaro kick), 2:50. Cardinals 14–10. Drive: 4 plays, 17 yards, 2:04.
- CAR – Graham Gano 39-yard field goal, 0:15. Cardinals 14–13. Drive: 9 plays, 59 yards, 2:35.

Third quarter

- CAR – Fozzy Whittaker 39-yard pass from Cam Newton (Graham Gano kick), 5:36. Panthers 20–14. Drive: 1 play, 39 yards, 0:14.
- CAR – Mike Tolbert 1-yard pass from Cam Newton (Graham Gano kick), 4:04. Panthers 27–14. Drive: 3 plays, 3 yard, 1:24.

Fourth quarter

- ARI – Brad Nortman tackled in end zone by Justin Bethel, 0:03. Panthers 27–16.

Top passers

- ARI – Ryan Lindley – 16/28, 82 Yds, 1 TD, 2 INT
- CAR – Cam Newton – 18/32, 198 Yds, 2 TD, 1 INT

Top rushers

- ARI – Kerwynn Williams – 10 Car, 23 Yds
- CAR – Jonathan Stewart – 24 Car, 123 Yds, 1 TD

Top receivers

- ARI – John Brown – 4 Rec, 34 Yds
- CAR – Fozzy Whittaker – 1 Rec, 39 Yds, 1 TD

The Cardinals' offensive performance was historically bad as their season ended against the 7-8-1 Panthers by a final score of 27-16. They committed three turnovers (two of them being red zone interceptions), gained only 8 first downs, 6 of which were in the first half. They set a dubious NFL postseason record with only 78 net yards of offense, the fewest yards gained in a playoff game by any team in NFL postseason history.

== Standings ==
=== Division ===
NFC West
	W	L	T	PCT	DIV	CONF	PF	PA	STK
^{(1)} Seattle Seahawks	12	4	0	.750	5–1	10–2	394	254	W6
^{(5)} Arizona Cardinals	11	5	0	.688	3–3	8–4	310	299	L2
San Francisco 49ers	8	8	0	.500	2–4	7–5	306	340	W1
St. Louis Rams	6	10	0	.375	2–4	4–8	324	354	L3

=== Conference ===
NFC
#	Team	Division	W	L	T	PCT	DIV	CONF	SOS	SOV	STK
Division leaders
1 (Note: Seattle, Green Bay and Dallas were ranked in seeds 1–3 based on conference record.)	Seattle Seahawks	West	12	4	0	.750	5–1	10–2	.525	.513	W6
2	Green Bay Packers	North	12	4	0	.750	5–1	9–3	.482	.440	W2
3	Dallas Cowboys	East	12	4	0	.750	4–2	8–4	.445	.422	W4
4	Carolina Panthers	South	7	8	1	.469	4–2	6–6	.490	.357	W4
Wild Cards
5 (Note: Arizona defeated Detroit head-to-head (Week 11, 14–6).)	Arizona Cardinals	West	11	5	0	.688	3–3	8–4	.523	.477	L2
6	Detroit Lions	North	11	5	0	.688	5–1	9–3	.471	.392	L1
Did not qualify for the postseason
7	Philadelphia Eagles	East	10	6	0	.625	4–2	6–6	.490	.416	W1
8	San Francisco 49ers	West	8	8	0	.500	2–4	7–5	.527	.508	W1
9 (Note: New Orleans defeated Minnesota head-to-head (Week 3, 20–9).)	New Orleans Saints	South	7	9	0	.438	3–3	6–6	.486	.415	W1
10	Minnesota Vikings	North	7	9	0	.438	1–5	6–6	.475	.308	W1
11 (Note: The NY Giants defeated both Atlanta and St. Louis head-to-head (Atlanta: Week 5, 30–20; St. Louis: Week 16, 37–27), while Atlanta finished ahead of St. Louis based on conference record.)	New York Giants	East	6	10	0	.375	2–4	4–8	.512	.323	L1
12	Atlanta Falcons	South	6	10	0	.375	5–1	6–6	.482	.380	L1
13	St. Louis Rams	West	6	10	0	.375	2–4	4–8	.531	.427	L3
14	Chicago Bears	North	5	11	0	.313	1–5	4–8	.529	.338	L5
15	Washington Redskins	East	4	12	0	.250	2–4	2–10	.496	.422	L1
16	Tampa Bay Buccaneers	South	2	14	0	.125	0–6	1–11	.486	.469	L6
Tiebreakers (Note: When breaking ties for three or more teams under the NFL's rules, they are first broken within divisions, then comparing only the highest-ranked remaining team from each division.)

== Statistics ==
=== Starters ===
==== Regular season ====
Offense

Pos.	Name	GS
QB	Carson Palmer; Drew Stanton; Ryan Lindley	6; 8; 2
RB	Andre Ellington; Stepfan Taylor	12; 4
WR1	Larry Fitzgerald; Michael Floyd	14; 2
WR2	Michael Floyd; John Brown	14; 2
TE	John Carlson	16
TE	Rob Housler; Darren Fells	15; 1
LT	Jared Veldheer	16
LG	Ted Larsen; Jonathan Cooper	14; 2
C	Lyle Sendlein	16
RG	Paul Fanaika; Ted Larsen	14; 2
RT	Bobby Massie	16

Defense

Pos.	Name	GS
DE	Calais Campbell; Ed Stinson	14; 2
NT	Tommy Kelly; Dan Williams	15; 1
DE	Frostee Rucker; Tommy Kelly	15; 1
OLB	John Abraham; Alex Okafor; Matt Shaughnessy	1; 12; 3
LB	Larry Foote; Glenn Carson	15; 1
LB	Kevin Minter	16
OLB	Matt Shaughnessy; Thomas Keiser; Sam Acho	4; 1; 11
CB	Patrick Peterson	16
SS	Rashad Johnson	16
FS	Tony Jefferson; Tyrann Mathieu	8; 8
CB	Antonio Cromartie	16

Special Teams

Pos.	Name	GS
P	Drew Butler; Dave Zastudil	14; 2
K	Chandler Catanzaro	16
LS	Mike Leach	16

==== Postseason ====
Offense

Pos.	Name	GS
QB	Ryan Lindley	1
RB	Stepfan Taylor	1
WR1	Larry Fitzgerald	1
WR2	Michael Floyd	1
TE	John Carlson	1
TE	Darren Fells	1
LT	Jared Veldheer	1
LG	Ted Larsen	1
C	Lyle Sendlein	1
RG	Paul Fanaika	1
RT	Bobby Massie	1

Defense

Pos.	Name	GS
DE	Calais Campbell	1
NT	Tommy Kelly	1
DE	Frostee Rucker	1
OLB	Alex Okafor	1
LB	Larry Foote	1
LB	Kevin Minter	1
OLB	Sam Acho	1
CB	Patrick Peterson	1
SS	Rashad Johnson	1
FS	Tony Jefferson	1
CB	Antonio Cromartie	1

Special Teams

Pos.	Name	GS
P	Drew Butler	1
K	Chandler Catanzaro	1
LS	Mike Leach	1

=== Individual leaders ===
Category	Player(s)	Value
Passing yards	Drew Stanton	1,711
Passing touchdowns	Carson Palmer	11
Rushing yards	Andre Ellington	660
Rushing touchdowns	Andre Ellington	3
Receptions	Larry Fitzgerald	63
Receiving yards	Michael Floyd	841
Receiving touchdowns	Michael Floyd	6
Kickoff return yards	Ted Ginn Jr	417
Punt return yards	Ted Ginn Jr	277
Punt return touchdowns	Ted Ginn Jr	1
Tackles	Rashad Johnson	92
Sacks	Alex Okafor	8.0
Forced fumbles	Frostee Rucker	2
Interceptions	Rashad Johnson	4
Kicking - field goals	Chandler Catanzaro	29/33, 87.9%

=== Records, milestones, and notable statistics ===
Week 2

- Ted Ginn Jr. returned a punt 71 yards for a touchdown. This was the first punt returned for a touchdown by the Cardinals since week 12 of the 2011 season. As of November 2026, this remains the most recent punt returned for a touchdown by the Cardinals.

=== Team rankings ===
Category	Value	NFL rank (out of 32)
Passing attempts	568	
Passing completions	320	15th
Passing yards	3,808	14th
Passing touchdowns	21	20th
Interceptions thrown	12	8th
Rushing attempts	397	24th
Rushing yards	1,308	31st
Rushing touchdowns	6	29th
Rushing yards/attempt	3.3	32nd
Total yards of offense	5,116	24th
Points scored	310	24th
Points allowed	299	5th
Passing yards allowed	4,152	29th
Passing touchdowns allowed	22	6th
Rushing attempts against	396	8th
Rushing yards allowed	1,739	13th
Rushing touchdowns allowed	9	8th
Yards/rush attempt allowed	4.4	26th
Interceptions made	18	7th
Fumbles recovered	7	23rd
Total yards allowed	5,891	24th

Statistics correct as of the end of the 2014 NFL season
