= Darren Fells =

American football player (born 1986)

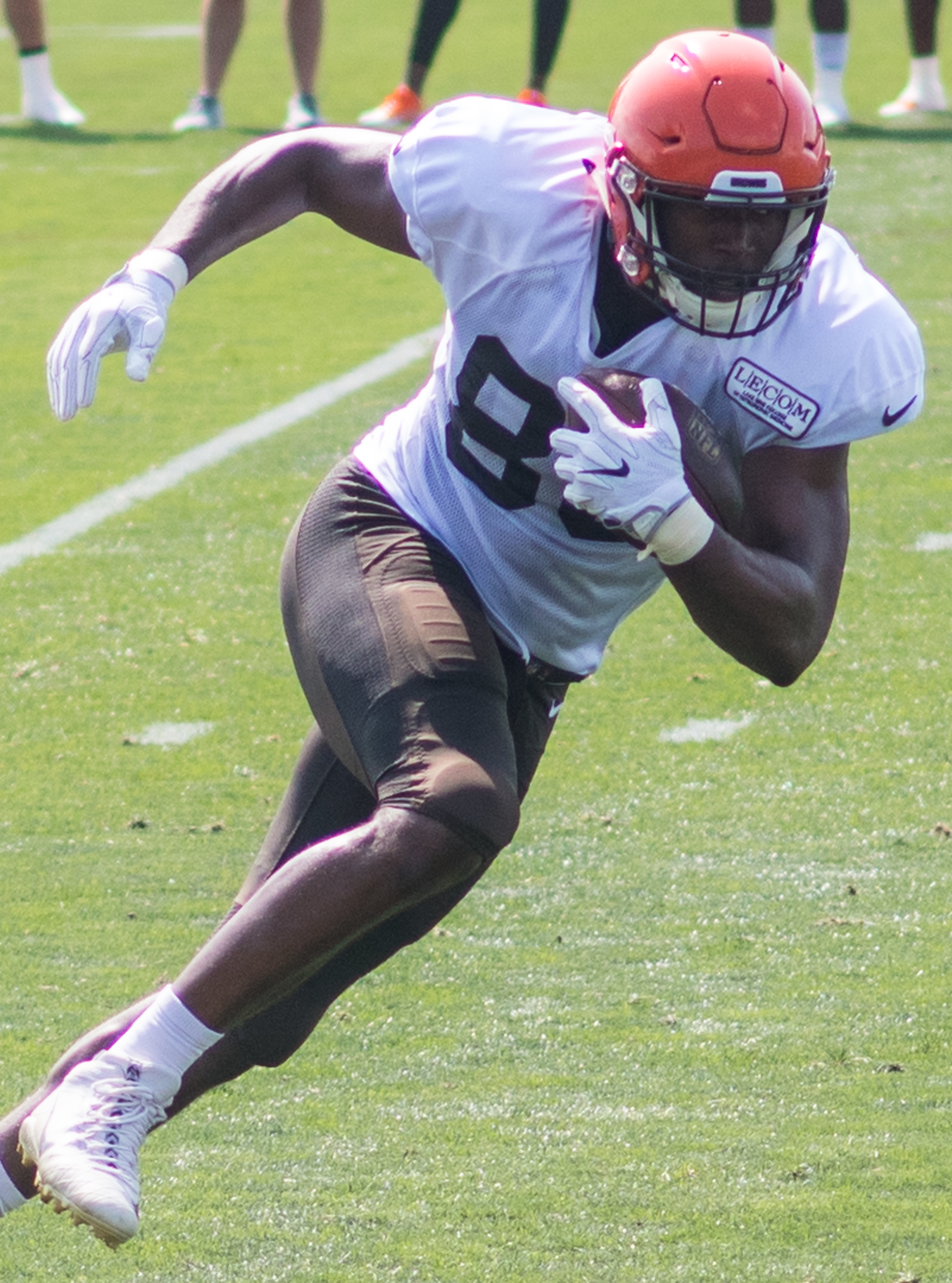
- Fells with the Cleveland Browns in 2018

No. 85, 87, 88, 80
- Position: Tight end

Personal information
- Born: April 22, 1986 (age 40); Fullerton, California, U.S.
- Listed height: 6 ft 7 in (2.01 m)
- Listed weight: 270 lb (122 kg)

Career information
- High school: Fullerton Union
- College: UC Irvine (basketball)
- NFL draft: 2013: undrafted

Career history
- Seattle Seahawks (2013)*; Arizona Cardinals (2013–2016); Detroit Lions (2017); Cleveland Browns (2018); Houston Texans (2019–2020); Detroit Lions (2021); Tampa Bay Buccaneers (2021)
- * Offseason or practice squad member only

Career NFL statistics
- Receptions: 127
- Receiving yards: 1,526
- Receiving touchdowns: 21
- Stats at Pro Football Reference

Darren Andre Fells (born April 22, 1986) is an American former professional football player who was a tight end in the National Football League (NFL). He did not play college football, instead playing college basketball for the UC Irvine Anteaters. Prior to his NFL career, Fells played professional basketball in several countries and was then signed by the Seattle Seahawks in 2013. He has also played for the Arizona Cardinals, Detroit Lions, Cleveland Browns, Houston Texans, and Tampa Bay Buccaneers.

== Early life ==
Fells attended Fullerton Union High School in Fullerton, California, where he played basketball and was selected to the All-CIF Southern Section II-A second team as a junior while averaging 17 points and 10 rebounds as the team's center. Fells was also named All-Freeway League second team in his junior season.

== Professional basketball career ==
Darren Fells
Personal information
- Listed height: 6 ft 7 in (2.01 m)
- Listed weight: 244 lb (111 kg)

Career information
- High school: Fullerton Union (Fullerton, California)
- College: UC Irvine (2004–2008)
- NBA draft: 2008: undrafted
- Playing career: 2008–2012
- Position: Power forward / center
- Number: 14, 12, 7

Career history
- 2008–2010: Leuven Bears (Belgium)
- 2010–2011: Kataja (Finland)
- 2011: Étendard de Brest (France)
- 2011–2012: Soles de Mexicali (Mexico)
- 2008 and 2012: Obras Sanitarias (Argentina)

Career highlights
- Second-team All-Big West (2008); 2× honorable mention All-Big West (2006–2007)

From 2008 to 2012, Fells played professional basketball in Argentina, Mexico, Belgium, Finland, and France.

As a rookie on the Basketball League Belgium Division I team Leuven Bears in 2008–09, Fells wore the jersey #14 and averaged 9.3 points, 4.9 rebounds, and 1.5 assists in 33 games. In his second season with the team in 2009–10, Fells averaged 8.1 points and 4.7 rebounds.

In the 2010–11 season, Fells played for Kataja Basket Club of the Finnish Korisliiga, wearing jersey #7. In 55 games, he averaged 13.8 points and 8.3 rebounds. Kataja were runners-up of the 2011 Korisliiga Finals.

A Étendard de Brest of French LNB Pro B, Fells played 25 games for Soles de Mexicali of the Mexican Liga Nacional de Baloncesto Profesional in the 2011–12 season and wore jersey #12. He averaged 13.5 points and 7.5 rebounds. After the LNBP season ended, Fells played nine games for Obras Sanitarias of the Argentine Liga Nacional de Basquet from March to April 2012 and averaged 6.9 points and 4.7 rebounds. Like at Soles de Mexicali, Fells wore jersey #12 for Obras.

In December 2012, Fells signed with Libertad de Sunchales but did not play any games.

== Professional football career ==
=== Seattle Seahawks ===
On March 6, 2013, Fells was signed by the Seattle Seahawks. On May 18, he was waived, but was re-signed two days later.

On August 31, 2013, Fells was released by the Seahawks.

=== Arizona Cardinals ===
==== 2013 season ====
On October 9, 2013, Fells signed with the Arizona Cardinals practice squad. On January 1, 2014, he signed a reserve/future contract with the team.

==== 2014 season ====
Fells entered training camp competing with John Carlson, Troy Niklas, and Jake Ballard to be a backup tight end. He was named the fifth tight end on the Cardinals' depth chart to begin the regular season, behind Rob Housler, John Carlson, Troy Niklas, and Jake Ballard.

During Week 3 against the San Francisco 49ers, Fells made his first NFL start but recorded no statistics in the 23–14 comeback victory. During a Week 15 12–6 road victory over the St. Louis Rams, he made his first NFL reception on a six-yard pass from Carson Palmer. In the regular-season finale against the 49ers, Fells caught a 24-yard pass for his longest catch of the season and finished the 20–17 road loss with two receptions for 39 yards.

Fells finished the 2014 season with five receptions for 71 yards in 10 games and five starts. On January 3, 2015, he appeared in his first NFL postseason game after the Cardinals finished the season with an 11–5 record. During the Wild Card round against the Carolina Panthers, Fells scored his first NFL touchdown on a one-yard reception from Ryan Lindley in the 27–16 road loss.

==== 2015 season ====
Fells started the 2015 season as the second tight end behind Jermaine Gresham.

During the season-opener against the New Orleans Saints, Fells recorded four receptions for 82 yards and a touchdown in the 31–19 victory. During a Week 6 25–13 road loss to the Pittsburgh Steelers, he had a nine-yard reception before suffering a shoulder sprain that kept him out the next two games.

Fells finished the 2015 season with a then-career-high 21 receptions for 311 yards and three touchdowns in 14 games and 12 starts. During the postseason, Fells caught four receptions for 50 yards and a touchdown before the team lost to the Panthers in the NFC Championship Game.

==== 2016 season ====
On February 1, 2016, Fells re-signed with the Cardinals on a one-year deal.

Fells remained the Cardinals' second tight end behind Gresham. During a Week 2 40–7 victory over the Tampa Bay Buccaneers, Fells had a career-high four receptions for 31 yards. In the regular-season finale against the Los Angeles Rams, Fells recorded his only touchdown of the season on a 37-yard reception from Carson Palmer during the 44–6 road victory.

Fells finished the 2016 season with 14 receptions for 154 yards and a touchdown in 14 games and seven starts.

=== Detroit Lions ===
On March 11, 2017, Fells signed a one-year, $1.5 million contract with the Detroit Lions. He entered training camp competing with Cole Wick, Khari Lee, and Michael Roberts to be the backup tight end. Fells was named the backup behind Eric Ebron to begin the regular season. Ebron struggled with drops in the first half of the season, and Fells saw increased snaps and eventually started in place of him.

During a Week 5 27–24 loss to the Panthers, Fells had his first two-touchdown game when he recorded two passes for 24 yards, both for touchdowns. In the next game against the Saints, Fells had two receptions for 26 yards and a touchdown during the 52–38 road loss.

Fells finished the 2017 season with 17 receptions for 177 yards and three touchdowns in 16 games and 13 starts.

=== Cleveland Browns ===
On March 15, 2018, Fells signed a three-year contract with the Cleveland Browns.

During a Week 4 45–42 overtime road loss to the Oakland Raiders, Fells had a 49-yard touchdown reception. He finished the 2018 season with 11 receptions for 117 yards and three touchdowns in 16 games and 11 starts.

On March 11, 2019, Fells was released by the Browns.

=== Houston Texans ===
==== 2019 season ====
On March 18, 2019, Fells signed a one-year contract with the Houston Texans.

During a Week 3 27–20 road victory over the Los Angeles Chargers, Fells had five receptions for 49 yards and his first touchdown of the season. Two weeks later against the Atlanta Falcons, he recorded two receptions for 20 yards, both for touchdowns, in the 53–32 victory. During a Week 8 27–24 victory over the Raiders, Fells had six receptions for 58 yards and two touchdowns.

During a Week 13 28–22 victory over the New England Patriots, Fells set the single-season record for most touchdown receptions by a tight end in franchise history after recording two receptions for 23 yards and a touchdown. The record was previously held by Owen Daniels and Joel Dreessen.

Fells finished the 2019 season with 34 receptions for 341 yards and seven touchdowns in 16 games and 14 starts, all career-highs. In the postseason, he had seven receptions for 59 yards and a touchdown before the Texans lost to the Kansas City Chiefs in the Divisional Round.

==== 2020 season ====
On March 10, 2020, Fells was re-signed to a two-year, $7 million contract by the Texans.

During a Week 5 30–14 victory over the Jacksonville Jaguars, Fells recorded two receptions for 57 yards and a 44-yard touchdown. The touchdown was the Texans' longest play from scrimmage during the first five weeks of the season. In the next game against the Tennessee Titans, Fells had six receptions for 85 yards and a touchdown during the 42–36 overtime road loss. He finished the 2020 season with 21 receptions for 312 yards and four touchdowns in 16 games and 14 starts.

On March 18, 2021, Fells was released by the Texans.

=== Detroit Lions (second stint) ===
Fells signed with the Detroit Lions on May 5, 2021. On November 8, he requested and was granted his release from the team.

=== Tampa Bay Buccaneers ===
On November 10, 2021, the Tampa Bay Buccaneers signed Fells to their practice squad. He appeared in two games and recorded no statistics.

== NFL career statistics ==
=== Regular season ===
Year	Team	Games		Receiving				
Year	Team	GP	GS	Rec	Yds	Avg	Lng	TD
2014	ARI	10	5	5	71	14.2	24	0
2015	ARI	14	12	21	311	14.8	48	3
2016	ARI	14	7	14	154	11.0	37T	1
2017	DET	16	13	17	177	10.4	23	3
2018	CLE	16	11	11	117	10.6	49T	3
2019	HOU	16	14	34	341	10.0	24	7
2020	HOU	16	14	21	312	14.9	44T	4
2021	DET	7	5	4	43	10.8	24	0
2021	TB	2	0	0	0	0.0	0	0
Career		111	81	127	1,526	12.0	49T	21

=== Postseason ===
Year	Team	Games		Receiving				
Year	Team	GP	GS	Rec	Yds	Avg	Lng	TD
2014	ARI	1	1	1	1	1.0	1T	1
2015	ARI	2	1	4	50	12.5	21T	1
2019	HOU	2	2	7	59	8.4	14	1
Career		5	4	12	110	9.2	21T	3

== Personal life ==
Fells is the younger brother of former NFL tight end Daniel Fells.
