= Larry Foote =

American football player and coach (born 1980)

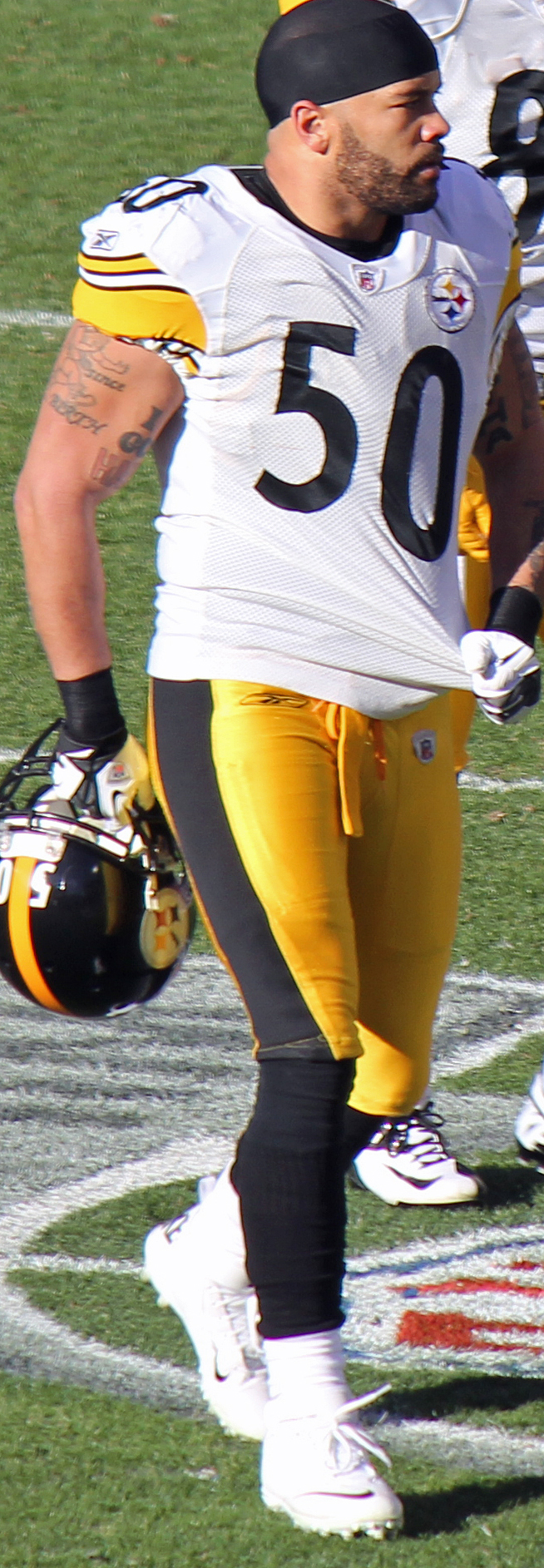
- Foote with the Pittsburgh Steelers in 2012

Tampa Bay Buccaneers
- Title: Run game coordinator, Outside linebackers coach

Personal information
- Born: June 12, 1980 (age 46); Detroit, Michigan, U.S.
- Listed height: 6 ft 1 in (1.85 m)
- Listed weight: 239 lb (108 kg)

Career information
- Position: Linebacker (No. 50, 55)
- High school: Pershing (Detroit)
- College: Michigan (1998–2001)
- NFL draft: 2002: 4th round, 128th overall pick

Career history

Playing
- Pittsburgh Steelers (2002–2008); Detroit Lions (2009); Pittsburgh Steelers (2010–2013); Arizona Cardinals (2014)

Coaching
- Arizona Cardinals (2015–2018); Assistant linebackers coach (2015); Linebackers coach (2016–2018); Tampa Bay Buccaneers (2019–present); Outside linebackers coach (2019–2021); Pass game coordinator & inside linebackers coach (2022–2024); Run game coordinator & outside linebackers coach (2025–present)

Awards and highlights
- As a player: 2× Super Bowl champion (XL, XLIII); First-team All-American (2001); Big Ten Defensive Player of the Year (2001); 2× First-team All-Big Ten (2000, 2001); As a coach: Super Bowl champion (LV)

Career NFL statistics
- Tackles: 818
- Sacks: 25
- Safeties: 1
- Forced fumbles: 10
- Fumble recoveries: 9
- Pass deflections: 27
- Interceptions: 4
- Interception yards: 26
- Stats at Pro Football Reference
- Coaching profile at Pro Football Reference

Lawrence Edward Foote Jr. (born June 12, 1980) is an American professional football coach and former player who is currently the run game coordinator and outside linebackers coach for the Tampa Bay Buccaneers of the National Football League (NFL). He played linebacker for 13 seasons in the NFL. He played college football for the Michigan Wolverines. Foote was selected in the fourth round of the 2002 NFL draft by the Pittsburgh Steelers, where he won two Super Bowl championships. He also played for the Detroit Lions and Arizona Cardinals. Following his playing career, Foote immediately started coaching with the Cardinals giving him his first coaching job.

== College career ==
Foote played college football at the University of Michigan where he started 28-of-48 games recording 212 tackles (145 solo) and 11 sacks for minus-91 yards and 53 stops for losses of 155 yards. He ranked fourth in school history in stops behind the line of scrimmage.

Foote was an All-Big Ten Conference first-team choice by the league's coaches as a junior in 2000, earned second-team honors from the media, he played in every game during his freshman and sophomore season. He majored in physical education in the division of kinesiology.

As a senior in 2001, Foote was a first-team All-American selection by Football News, a second-team selection by The Sporting News, a consensus All-Big Ten Conference first-team honoree and Defensive Player of the Year. He also received the Roger Zatkoff Award in 2001, given to the team's top linebacker.

On October 27, playing for the 2001 Wolverines against Iowa, Foote set a school record with 7 tackles for a loss. The record stood until November 4, 2017, when Khaleke Hudson posted 8 against Minnesota in the Little Brown Jug rivalry game.

== Professional career ==
Pre-draft measurables
Height	Weight	Arm length	Hand span	40-yard dash	10-yard split	20-yard split	20-yard shuttle	Three-cone drill	Vertical jump	Bench press
6 ft 0 7/8 in (1.85 m)	231 lb (105 kg)	30 1/2 in (0.77 m)	9 1/4 in (0.23 m)	4.83 s	1.68 s	2.76 s	4.41 s	7.18 s	30.0 in (0.76 m)	24 reps
All values from NFL Combine

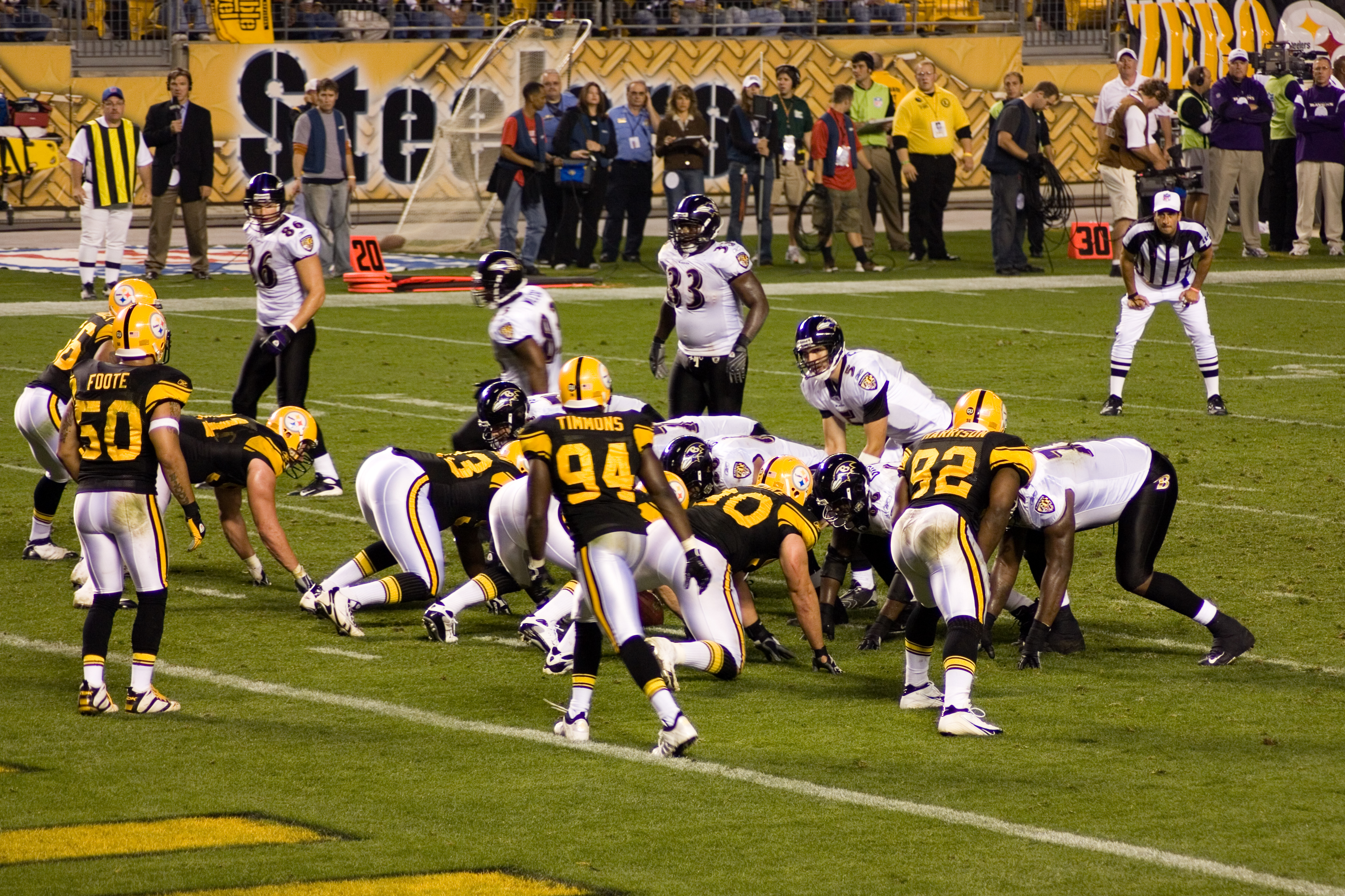
Foote (50) playing against the Baltimore Ravens in 2008.

=== Pittsburgh Steelers (first stint) ===
Foote was selected by the Pittsburgh Steelers in the fourth round (128th overall) in the 2002 NFL draft. In his rookie year, he played in 14 games recording 20 tackles. The following year, saw him play more of a role on special teams but he finished the season with six tackles. In 2004, Foote had a very solid year for the Steelers registering 69 tackles, three sacks and his first career interception. He had a breakout year in 2005. He started all 16 regular season games for the Steelers, recording 102 tackles and three quarterback sacks. Foote also had a key interception of Denver Broncos quarterback Jake Plummer during the 2005 AFC Championship Game. The Broncos, trailing in the game, returned a Steelers kick to midfield which threatened to shift the momentum away from the Steelers. However, on the next play from scrimmage, Foote intercepted Plummer's pass and effectively ended the Broncos rally. Foote and the Steelers won Super Bowl XL two weeks later. The 2006 season was another good one for Foote, as he finished with 90 tackles, a career-high four sacks and one interception. In the 2007 season, he made 81 tackles, three sacks and one interception.

Foote was released by Pittsburgh on May 4, 2009, ending a seven-year career with the Steelers that included two Super Bowl titles. Foote had requested the release due to his diminishing playing time with the team after they drafted Lawrence Timmons in 2007.

=== Detroit Lions ===
Foote signed a one-year deal with his hometown Detroit Lions on May 6, 2009. He wore number 55, since the number 50, the number he wore in Pittsburgh, was worn by linebacker Ernie Sims.

=== Pittsburgh Steelers (second stint) ===
On March 15, 2010, Foote signed a 3-year, $9.3 million contract to return to the Pittsburgh Steelers. On March 12, 2013, Foote signed another 3-year contract to remain with the Steelers.

On March 5, 2014, Foote was released by the Steelers.

=== Arizona Cardinals ===
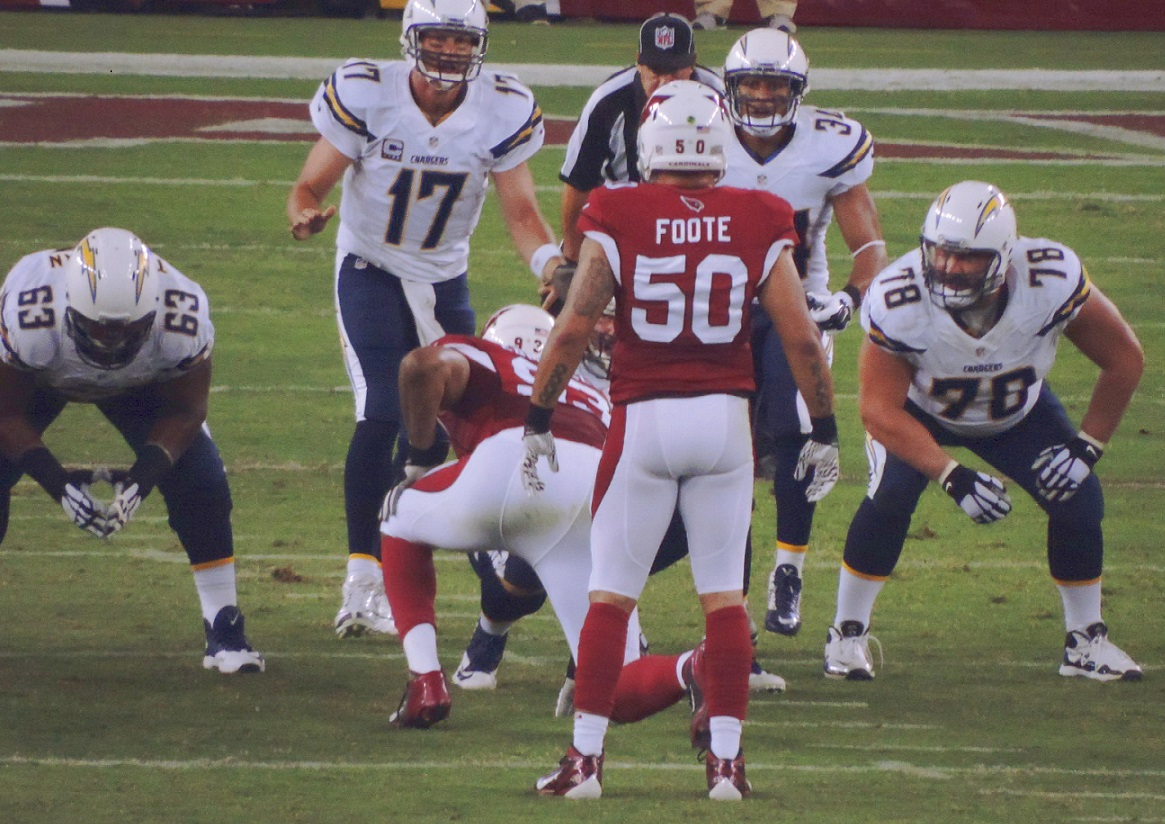
Larry Foote playing for the Arizona Cardinals.

On May 6, 2014, Foote signed with the Arizona Cardinals. He finished 7th in Comeback Player of the Year voting for the 2014 season. The team released him as a procedural move so he could begin his duties as assistant linebackers coach, and he officially retired from football prior to the 2015 NFL regular season.

== NFL career statistics ==
Legend
**Bold**	Career high

=== Regular season ===
Year	Team	Games		Tackles					Interceptions					Fumbles			
Year	Team	GP	GS	Cmb	Solo	Ast	Sck	TFL	Int	Yds	TD	Lng	PD	FF	FR	Yds	TD
2002	PIT	14	3	30	21	9	0.0	2	0	0	0	0	0	0	1	0	0
2003	PIT	16	0	6	5	1	0.0	0	0	0	0	0	0	0	0	1	0
2004	PIT	16	16	70	53	17	3.0	8	**1**	1	0	1	2	1	1	0	0
2005	PIT	16	16	102	**76**	26	3.0	**13**	0	0	0	0	2	0	1	**27**	0
2006	PIT	16	16	91	62	29	**4.0**	5	**1**	11	0	11	3	2	1	0	0
2007	PIT	16	16	85	46	**39**	3.0	5	**1**	**14**	0	**14**	**5**	**3**	0	0	0
2008	PIT	16	16	63	34	29	1.5	3	0	0	0	0	3	1	0	0	0
2009	DET	14	14	99	70	29	2.0	11	0	0	0	0	4	1	1	0	0
2010	PIT	16	0	21	16	5	1.0	2	0	0	0	0	1	0	0	0	0
2011	PIT	15	5	47	30	17	1.5	2	0	0	0	0	1	0	0	0	0
2012	PIT	16	16	**113**	75	38	**4.0**	8	0	0	0	0	3	2	**2**	0	0
2013	PIT	1	1	8	3	5	0.0	0	0	0	0	0	0	0	0	0	0
2014	ARI	15	15	83	61	22	2.0	6	**1**	0	0	0	3	0	1	0	0
		187	134	818	552	266	25.0	65	4	26	0	14	27	10	9	27	0

=== Playoffs ===
Year	Team	Games		Tackles					Interceptions					Fumbles			
Year	Team	GP	GS	Cmb	Solo	Ast	Sck	TFL	Int	Yds	TD	Lng	PD	FF	FR	Yds	TD
2002	PIT	2	0	11	7	4	0.0	**2**	0	0	0	0	0	0	0	0	0
2004	PIT	2	2	4	3	1	0.0	0	0	0	0	0	0	0	0	0	0
2005	PIT	4	4	**24**	**16**	**8**	**0.5**	1	**1**	**14**	0	**14**	**1**	0	0	0	0
2007	PIT	1	1	6	5	1	0.0	1	0	0	0	0	0	0	0	0	0
2008	PIT	3	3	8	7	1	0.0	0	**1**	0	0	0	**1**	0	0	0	0
2010	PIT	3	0	2	2	0	0.0	0	0	0	0	0	0	0	0	0	0
2011	PIT	1	0	1	1	0	0.0	0	0	0	0	0	0	0	0	0	0
2014	ARI	1	1	4	3	1	0.0	**2**	0	0	0	0	0	0	0	0	0
		17	11	60	44	16	0.5	6	2	14	0	14	2	0	0	0	0

== Coaching career ==
=== Arizona Cardinals ===
On February 19, 2015, Foote was hired as assistant linebackers coach by the Arizona Cardinals. He was promoted to linebackers coach in 2016.

=== Tampa Bay Buccaneers ===
On January 12, 2019, Foote agreed to terms with the Tampa Bay Buccaneers to become their outside linebackers coach, rejoining the staff of Bruce Arians. Foote earned his first Super Bowl title as a coach and third Super Bowl title overall when the Buccaneers won Super Bowl LV. Following the 2021 season, Foote shifted roles to coaching the inside linebackers, but following Arians' resignation and the promotion of defensive coordinator Todd Bowles to head coach, Foote was named pass game coordinator of the Buccaneers. As Bowles retained his defensive play calling and coaching duties, he did not hire an official defensive coordinator, leaving Foote as one of two top defensive assistant coaches for Tampa Bay, along with run game coordinator Kacy Rodgers.

== Personal life ==
In March 2008, Foote paid for the funeral of Mark Brown-Williams, a ten-year-old child from Detroit, Michigan, who had drowned after falling through the ice on a tributary of the Rouge River in February. Foote had no pre-existing personal connection to the family, but he was touched after hearing of the tragedy, as he has a son of nearly that age himself and had played on the same frozen river when he was a child.

After playing and excelling in high school, collegiate and professional football in the state of Michigan, Foote was inducted into the Michigan Sports Hall of Fame on October 17, 2024.
