= Alex Okafor =

American football player (born 1991)

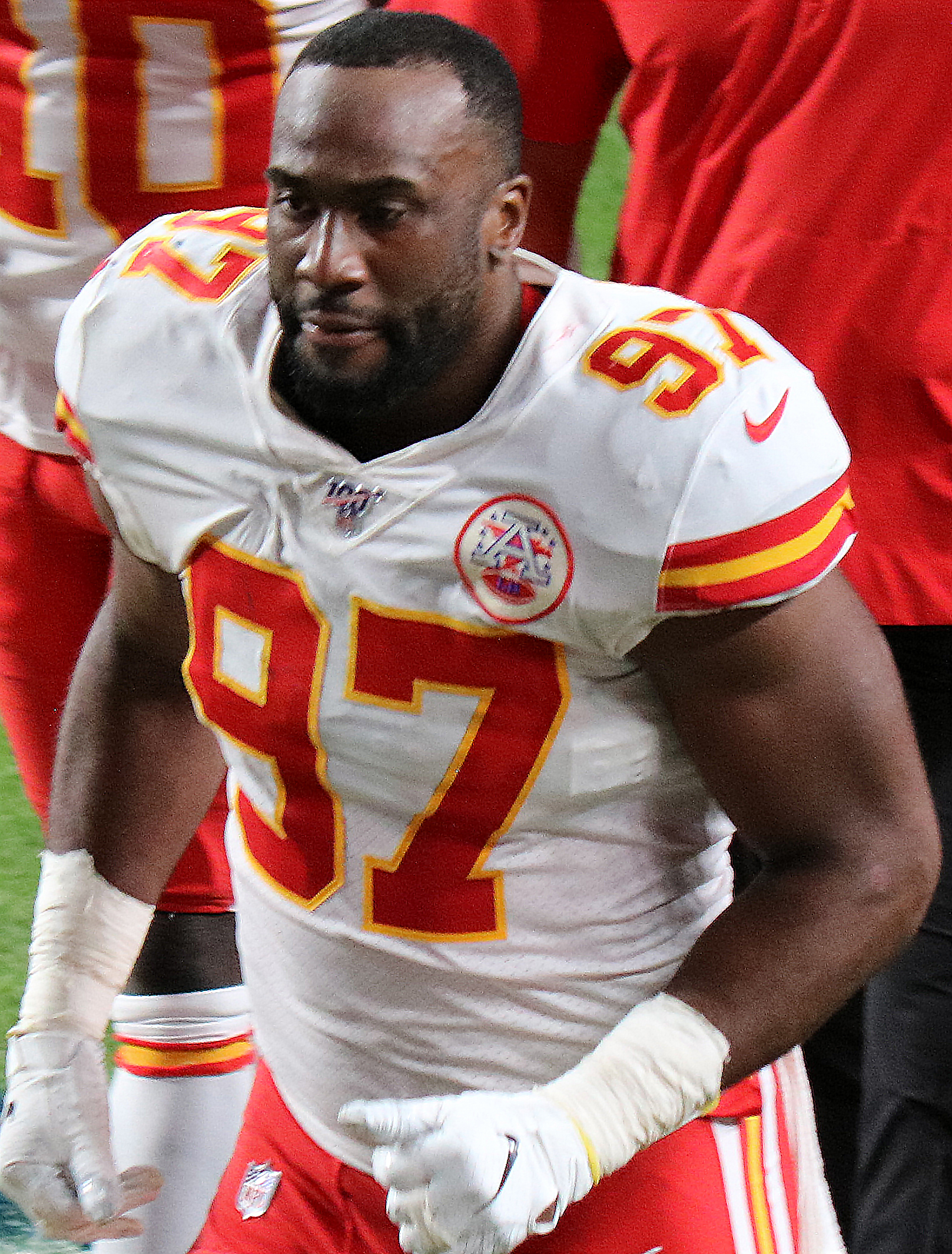
- Okafor with the Kansas City Chiefs in 2019

No. 57, 97
- Position: Defensive end

Personal information
- Born: February 8, 1991 (age 35); Dallas, Texas, U.S.
- Listed height: 6 ft 5 in (1.96 m)
- Listed weight: 261 lb (118 kg)

Career information
- High school: Pflugerville (Pflugerville, Texas)
- College: Texas
- NFL draft: 2013: 4th round, 103rd overall pick

Career history
- Arizona Cardinals (2013–2016); New Orleans Saints (2017–2018); Kansas City Chiefs (2019–2021)

Awards and highlights
- Super Bowl champion (LIV); First-team All-American (2011); 2× First-team All-Big 12 (2011, 2012); 2012 Alamo Bowl Defensive MVP

Career NFL statistics
- Total tackles: 215
- Sacks: 31.5
- Forced fumbles: 6
- Fumble recoveries: 3
- Interceptions: 1
- Stats at Pro Football Reference

Alex Okafor (born February 8, 1991) is an American former professional football player who was a defensive end in the National Football League (NFL). He played college football for the Texas Longhorns, earning All-American honors. Okafor was selected by the Arizona Cardinals in the fourth round of the 2013 NFL draft, and has also played for the New Orleans Saints and Kansas City Chiefs. He won Super Bowl LIV with the Chiefs.

== Early life ==
Okafor was born in Dallas, Texas to a Nigerian father and an African-American mother. His parents met in college at Grambling State University, a historically black university, before settling down in Texas.

Okafor attended Pflugerville High School in Pflugerville, Texas, and played for the Pflugerville Panthers high school football team, helping them to the 5A Div. II state championship. He also played soccer and basketball and was a stand out in both, as well as being academic all-district twice. Following his senior season, USA Today recognized him as a high school All-American in 2008.

== College career ==
Okafor attended the University of Texas at Austin, where he played for coach Mack Brown's Texas Longhorns football team from 2009 to 2012. In his freshman year, he helped Texas reach the BCS Championship Game, where he recorded one tackle in a loss to Alabama.

He finished his 2011 junior season with 46 tackles and seven quarterback sacks, and was named a first-team All-American as a defensive end by the American Football Coaches Association (AFCA). He was also a first-team All-Big 12 selection in 2011 and again in 2012 and made the UT Athletic Director's Honor Roll three times.

Okafor was named to the Bronko Nagurski Trophy, Bednarik Award, Lombardi Award, and CFPA Defensive Lineman Trophy watch lists to start the 2012 season. In his final game, he set the Alamo Bowl record for most sacks in a game.

== Professional career ==
=== Pre-draft ===
Okafor was ranked as one of the middle tier pass rushers in the 2013 NFL draft. He was projected as either a defensive end or linebacker in the NFL.

Pre-draft measurables
Height	Weight	Arm length	Hand span	40-yard dash	10-yard split	20-yard split	20-yard shuttle	Three-cone drill	Vertical jump	Broad jump	Bench press
6 ft 4 1/2 in (1.94 m)	264 lb (120 kg)	33 7/8 in (0.86 m)	9 5/8 in (0.24 m)	4.91 s	1.69 s	2.82 s	4.43 s	7.26 s	31 in (0.79 m)	9 ft 4 in (2.84 m)	21 reps
All values from NFL Combine

=== Arizona Cardinals ===
Okafor was selected by the Arizona Cardinals in the fourth round, with the 103rd overall pick in the 2013 NFL draft. He played in his first game in 2013, recording a special teams tackle before a bicep injury ended his season.

Okafor recorded his first two career sacks in Week 6 of the 2014 season against the Washington Redskins on quarterback Kirk Cousins. He had his first interception in Week 14 on Kansas City Chiefs' quarterback Alex Smith. He ended the season playing in 13 games with 12 starts, recording 30 tackles, 8 sacks, three passes defensed and one interception. During his time in Arizona, he played in 39 games (25 starts), tallying 74 tackles (63 solo), 13.5 sacks, 30 quarterback hits, 18 tackles for loss, four passes defended, one interception (returned for 26 yards), one forced fumble and two fumble recovery.

=== New Orleans Saints ===
On March 14, 2017, Okafor signed with the New Orleans Saints. He started the first 10 games of the season, recording a career-high 43 tackles, 4.5 sacks and four passes defended. He suffered a torn Achilles in the team's Week 11 win over the Redskins and was ruled out for the rest of the season.

On March 16, 2018, Okafor re-signed with the Saints on a two-year contract. He started all 16 games in 2018, recording 36 tackles and four sacks.

On February 14, 2019, the Saints voided the final year of Okafor's contract, making him a free agent at the start of the new league year.

=== Kansas City Chiefs ===
On March 14, 2019, Okafor signed a three-year, $18 million contract with the Kansas City Chiefs. In week 7 against the Denver Broncos, Okafor sacked Joe Flacco twice in the 30–6 win. He played in 10 games before suffering a torn pectoral in Week 15. He was placed on injured reserve on December 16, 2019. He finished the season with 22 tackles and five sacks. During his absence, the Chiefs went on to win Super Bowl LIV, their first championship in 50 years. On August 10, 2020, Okafor and the Chiefs restructured his contract to save about $2 million in cap space.

On October 24, 2020, Okafor was placed on injured reserve after suffering a hamstring injury in Week 6 and was activated on November 21, 2020. He played in 11 games and all 3 playoff games, recording 21 combined tackles and a forced fumble.

Okafor was re-signed on July 20, 2021. He played in all 17 games and all 3 playoff games, recording 27 combined tackles, 7 quarterback hits, 2 pass deflections and a forced fumble. He became a free agent at the end of the season but was left unsigned.

== NFL career statistics ==
Legend
**Bold**	Career high

=== Regular season ===
Year	Team	Games		Tackles					Interceptions					Fumbles			
Year	Team	GP	GS	Cmb	Solo	Ast	Sck	TFL	Int	Yds	TD	Lng	PD	FF	FR	Yds	TD
2013	ARI	1	0	1	1	0	0.0	0	0	0	0	0	0	0	0	0	0
2014	ARI	13	12	30	**28**	2	**8.0**	**11**	**1**	**26**	0	**26**	3	0	0	0	0
2015	ARI	13	13	31	25	6	2.0	4	0	0	0	0	1	0	**1**	0	0
2016	ARI	15	0	13	10	3	3.5	3	0	0	0	0	0	1	**1**	0	0
2017	NOR	10	10	**43**	27	**16**	4.5	5	0	0	0	0	**4**	**2**	0	0	0
2018	NOR	16	16	36	25	11	4.0	5	0	0	0	0	1	0	**1**	0	0
2019	KAN	10	9	22	15	7	5.0	5	0	0	0	0	1	1	0	0	0
2020	KAN	11	0	16	9	7	3.0	1	0	0	0	0	0	1	0	0	0
2021	KAN	17	0	23	7	**16**	1.5	0	0	0	0	0	2	1	0	0	0
		106	60	215	147	68	31.5	34	1	26	0	26	12	6	3	0	0

=== Playoffs ===
Year	Team	Games		Tackles					Interceptions					Fumbles			
Year	Team	GP	GS	Cmb	Solo	Ast	Sck	TFL	Int	Yds	TD	Lng	PD	FF	FR	Yds	TD
2014	ARI	1	1	**5**	**3**	2	0.0	0	0	0	0	0	0	0	0	0	0
2018	NOR	2	2	**5**	**3**	2	0.0	**1**	0	0	0	0	0	0	0	0	0
2020	KAN	3	0	**5**	0	**5**	0.0	0	0	0	0	0	0	0	0	0	0
2021	KAN	3	0	4	1	3	0.0	0	0	0	0	0	0	0	0	0	0
		9	3	19	7	12	0.0	1	0	0	0	0	0	0	0	0	0

== Educational career ==
In 2020 during his time with the Chiefs, Okafor sponsored the NFL youth education program Kingdom United at Pflugerville Independent School District. The program was brought to Spring Hill Elementary School, Okafor's old school and the only school not in the Kansas City area to receive it. The program taught unity and diversity among students, and Okafor said “When we first started the season, we wanted to dedicate time and energy into social justice initiatives and ending systemic racism,” and that he "wouldn’t be where I’m at without the education I received there, it was a no-brainer for me to adopt them and bring the Kingdom program to every single kid in that school.”

In 2024, Okafor ran to be on the PfISD Board of Trustees unopposed, and was elected on May 4. He said about running for office, "This has been sitting on my heart for a while now, finally pulled the trigger and submitted my name on the ballot. I’ve spent the last decade building opportunities for students and advocating for my community. I’m ready to take the next step and lead from a place in office." Since then, he has served on the Board and remained active in the Pflugerville community, hosting multiple book fairs and providing mentorship to students.

== Personal life ==
Okafor traveled to Kenya during the 2016 offseason with former Texas and Saints teammate Kenny Vaccaro and is involved in community and fundraising efforts to construct a school in the region.

On March 9, 2015, Okafor was arrested for evading arrest on foot and for a misdemeanor warrant for jaywalking in Austin, Texas after he knocked over a pedestrian.
