= Chandler Catanzaro =

American football player (born 1991)

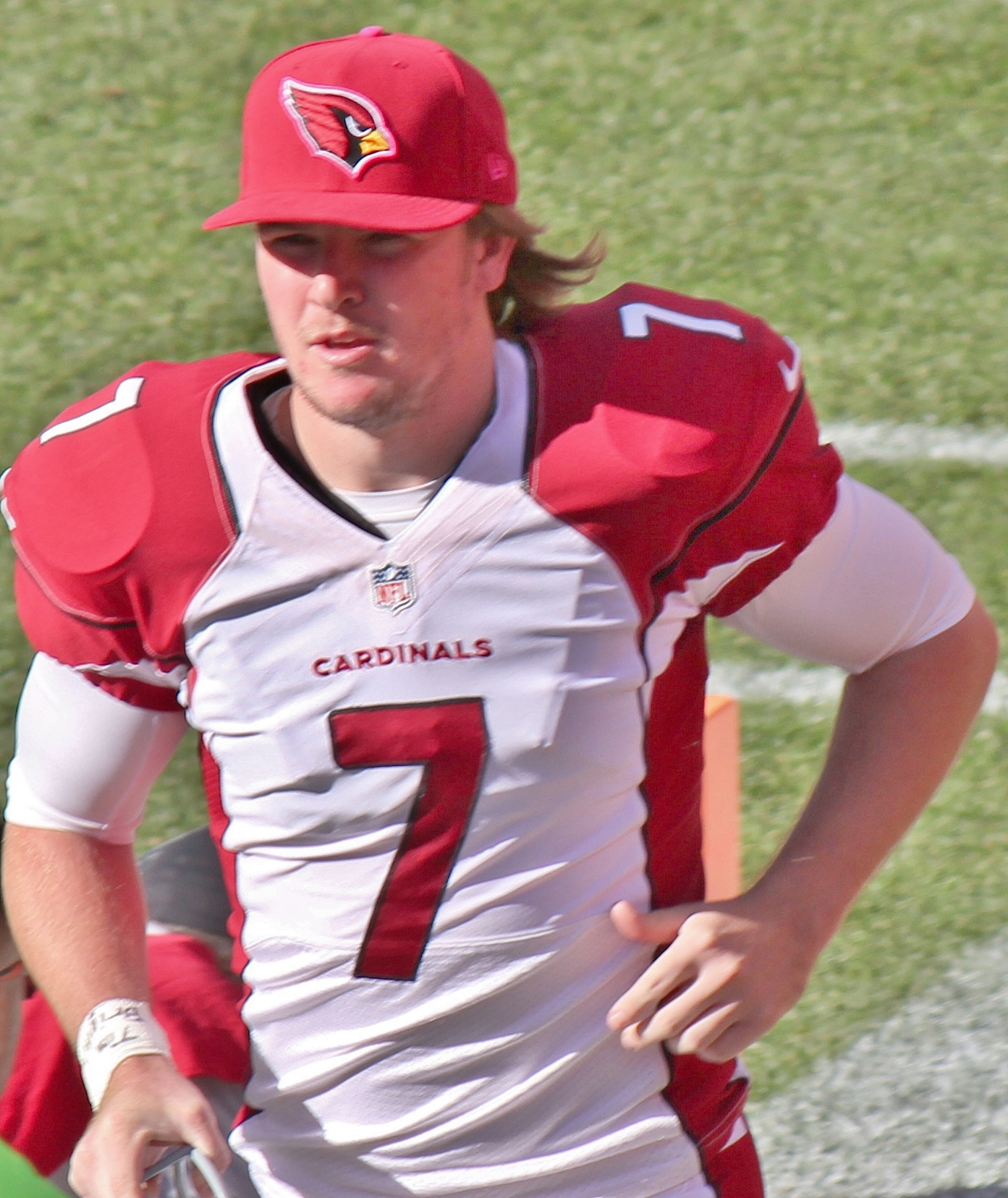
- Catanzaro with the Arizona Cardinals in 2014

No. 7, 4
- Position: Placekicker

Personal information
- Born: February 26, 1991 (age 35); Simpsonville, South Carolina, U.S.
- Listed height: 6 ft 3 in (1.91 m)
- Listed weight: 210 lb (95 kg)

Career information
- High school: Greenville (SC) Christ Church Episcopal
- College: Clemson (2009–2013)
- NFL draft: 2014: undrafted

Career history
- Arizona Cardinals (2014–2016); New York Jets (2017); Tampa Bay Buccaneers (2018); Carolina Panthers (2018); New York Jets (2019)*; New York Giants (2020)*
- * Offseason or practice squad member only

Awards and highlights
- Second-team All-ACC (2012)

Career NFL statistics
- Field goals: 128
- Field goals attempted: 142
- Field goal%: 83.8
- Longest field goal: 60
- Touchbacks: 237
- Stats at Pro Football Reference

Chandler Catanzaro (born February 26, 1991) is an American former professional football player who was a placekicker in the National Football League (NFL). He was signed by the Arizona Cardinals as an undrafted free agent in 2014 and later played for the New York Jets, Tampa Bay Buccaneers, and Carolina Panthers. He played college football for the Clemson Tigers.

== Early life ==
Catanzaro attended and played high school football at Christ Church Episcopal School. He considered two colleges: Furman University and Clemson University.

== College career ==
Catanzaro attended Clemson University from 2009 to 2013. After a freshman year, in which he only made 14 of 22 field goals, he finished with a field goal percentage of 81.7%, missing only one kick in each of his junior and senior years. Catanzaro was the all-time leading scorer in Clemson history with 404 points until Travis Etienne broke the record in 2020.

== Professional career ==
=== Arizona Cardinals ===
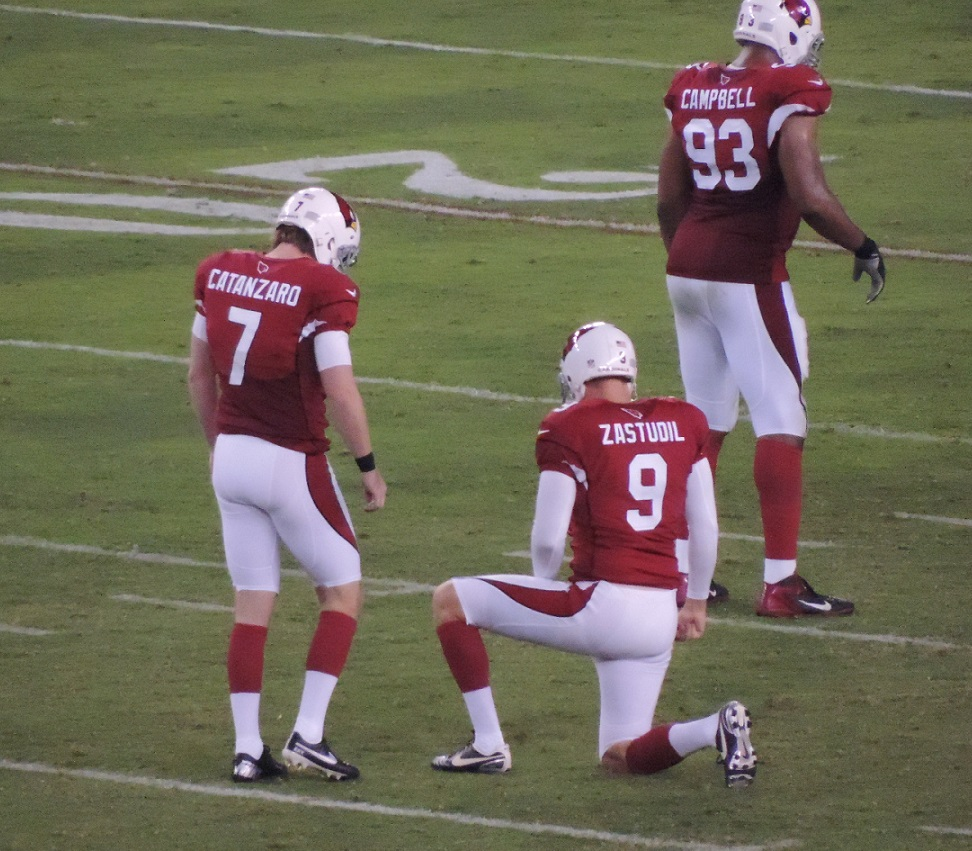
Catanzaro lining up a kick in 2014.

In May 2014, the Arizona Cardinals signed the undrafted Catanzaro to compete along with veterans Jay Feely and Danny Hrapmann. On August 25, 2014, Feely was cut, giving the kicking job to Catanzaro.

Catanzaro made his NFL debut on September 8, 2014, against the San Diego Chargers, kicking two field goals.

On September 14, 2014, Catanzaro kicked four field goals against the New York Giants. He became first Cardinals rookie kicker since Bill Gramatica (December 2, 2001, against the Oakland Raiders) with four field goals in a game.

On September 21, 2014, Catanzaro kicked a season/career-long 51-yard field goal against the San Francisco 49ers, which represents the longest field goal by a rookie in Arizona Cardinals history.

On October 26, 2014, he made his 16th consecutive field goal from the start of his career without a miss, setting an NFL rookie record.

On November 9, 2014, he extended the streak to 17, but missed his second attempt. This effort tied Kai Forbath for the record for most consecutive field goals to start a career.

Catanzaro made all 27 extra point attempts and 29 of 33 field goal attempts in the 2014 season, which is the fourth-most in a single season in Arizona Cardinals history, behind Greg Davis (30), Jay Feely (30), and Neil Rackers (40).

At the end of the 2014 season, Catanzaro established a new franchise rookie record with 114 points, shattering the previous mark of 73 set by placekicker Bill Gramatica in 2001. Catanzaro's 114 points ranked as the second-highest total among NFL rookies behind only the Philadelphia Eagles’ Cody Parkey (150).

On October 4, 2015, Catanzaro kicked a career-high five field goals against the St. Louis Rams. In the 2015 season, Catanzaro converted 53 of 58 extra point attempts and 28 of 31 field goal attempts.

In Week 3 of the 2016 season, Catanzaro kicked a career-long 60-yard field goal against the Buffalo Bills in Buffalo. At the time, it was only the 16th field goal of at least 60 yards in the history of the NFL. His 60-yard field goal was the longest conversion of any kicker in the 2016 season. In Week 7, Catanzaro missed the game-winning field goal in overtime against the Seattle Seahawks. The game eventually ended in a 6–6 tie. He finished the 2016 season converting 43 of 47 extra point attempts and 21 of 28 field goal attempts.

=== New York Jets (first stint) ===
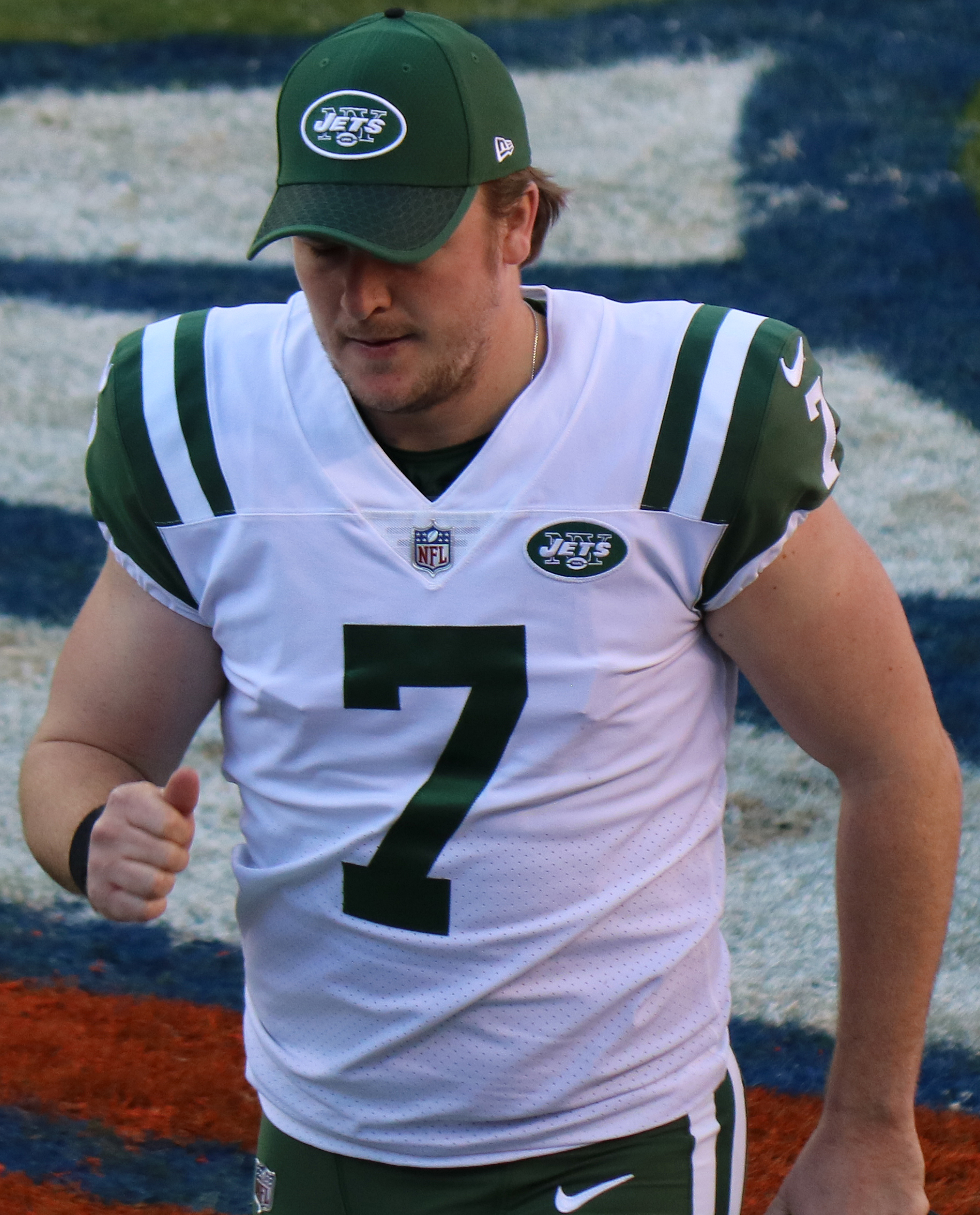
Catanzaro with the New York Jets in 2017

On March 10, 2017, Catanzaro signed with the New York Jets.

On September 10, 2017, in the season opening 21–12 loss to the Buffalo Bills, Catanzaro converted a 48-yard field goal and a 52-yard field goal in his Jets debut. In Week 4, the Jets were playing at home against the Jacksonville Jaguars. The game went into overtime with a score of 20–20. Catanzaro had missed a 45-yard field goal earlier in the game. With only 32 seconds left in overtime, he drilled a 41-yard field goal to win the game. In Week 5, Catanzaro kicked a 57-yard field goal, the longest in Jets franchise history. In the 2017 season, Catanzaro converted all 29 extra point attempts and 25 of 30 field goal attempts in 16 games.

=== Tampa Bay Buccaneers ===
On March 16, 2018, Catanzaro signed a three-year contract with the Tampa Bay Buccaneers. In the season opener against the New Orleans Saints, he tied his career-high with six extra points converted. On October 21, 2018, in a Week 7 matchup against the Cleveland Browns, after having missed an extra point attempt and a 40-yard field goal attempt earlier in the game Catanzaro hit a game winning 59-yard field goal in overtime to end the game 26–23, in the process setting the record for the longest field goal made in overtime in NFL history. On November 12, 2018, Catanzaro was released by the Buccaneers after missing two field goals in a 16–3 loss to the Washington Redskins. He finished his time with the Buccaneers 11-for-15 on field goals and 23-for-27 on extra points in nine games.

=== Carolina Panthers ===
On December 7, 2018, Catanzaro signed with the Carolina Panthers following an injury to Graham Gano.

=== New York Jets (second stint) ===
On March 15, 2019, Catanzaro signed with the Jets. After announcing his retirement on August 11, 2019, he was placed on the exempt/left squad list on August 11 and then placed on the reserve/left squad list on August 17. He was released from the reserve/left squad list on July 23, 2020.

=== New York Giants ===
Catanzaro signed with the New York Giants on August 1, 2020. He was released on August 17.

== Personal life ==
Catanzaro's father is a dermatologist. Catanzaro hoped as a child to also become a doctor; he enrolled at Medical University of South Carolina in 2023.

== Career statistics ==
=== NFL ===
Year	Team	GP	Overall FGs					PATs				Kickoffs					Points
Year	Team	GP	Blk	Lng	FGM	FGA	Pct	XPM	XPA	Pct	Blk	KO	Avg	TB	Ret	Avg	Points
2014	ARI	16	0	51	29	33	87.9	27	27	100.0	0	76	66.6	38	37	26.1	114
2015	ARI	16	0	47	28	31	90.3	53	58	91.4	0	99	65.1	50	49	24.3	137
2016	ARI	16	1	60	21	28	75.0	43	47	91.5	1	83	62.9	52	29	23.1	106
2017	NYJ	16	1	57	25	30	83.3	29	29	100.0	0	71	61.3	45	22	20.7	104
2018	TB	9	0	59	11	15	73.3	23	27	85.2	0	49	63.7	39	10	21.7	56
2018	CAR	4	0	51	5	5	100.0	7	8	87.5	0	16	62.4	13	3	20.7	22
Total		77	2	60	119	142	83.8	182	196	92.9	1	394	63.9	237	150	23.8	539

=== College ===
Year	School	Conf	Class	Pos	G	XPM	XPA	XP%	FGM	FGA	FG%	Pts
2010	Clemson	ACC	FR	K	13	34	34	100.0	14	22	63.6	76
2011	Clemson	ACC	SO	K	14	52	53	98.1	22	27	81.5	118
2012	Clemson	ACC	JR	K	13	57	59	96.6	18	19	94.7	111
2013	Clemson	ACC	SR	K	13	60	61	98.4	13	14	92.9	99
Career	Clemson					203	207	98.1	67	82	81.7	404
