= John Fullington =

American football player (born 1991)

No. 77
- Position: Guard

Personal information
- Born: May 30, 1991 (age 35); Bremerton, Washington, U.S.
- Listed height: 6 ft 5 in (1.96 m)
- Listed weight: 301 lb (137 kg)

Career information
- High school: North Mason (Belfair, Washington)
- College: Washington State
- NFL draft: 2014: undrafted

Career history
- Green Bay Packers (2014)*; San Francisco 49ers (2014)*; Arizona Cardinals (2014–2015); New Orleans Saints (2016–2017)
- * Offseason or practice squad member only

Career NFL statistics
- Games played: 1
- Stats at Pro Football Reference

John Fullington (born May 30, 1991) is an American former professional football player who was a guard in the National Football League (NFL). He played college football for the Washington State Cougars and signed with the Green Bay Packers as undrafted free agent in 2014.

== College career ==
Fullington started all 13 games at Washington State University as a senior in 2013, opening the first five games at right guard and the final eight at right tackle. He won the Mike Utley Award in 2013 for WSU's offensive lineman of the year. Fullington started the final 43 games of his career, which is tied for the longest streak by an offensive lineman in program history and tied for the second longest by any Cougar.

== Professional career ==
=== Green Bay Packers ===
Fullington signed with the Green Bay Packers as a rookie free agent on May 13, 2014. He was released on August 30, 2014, for final roster cuts.

=== San Francisco 49ers ===
The San Francisco 49ers signed Fullington to their practice squad on September 1, 2014. He was waived on October 7, 2014.

=== Arizona Cardinals ===
Fullington signed to the Arizona Cardinals' practice squad on December 8, 2014.

He signed a futures deal with the Cardinals on January 5, 2015. He was released on May 5, 2016.

=== New Orleans Saints ===
On July 29, 2016, Fullington signed with the New Orleans Saints. On September 3, 2016, he was waived by the Saints and was re-signed to the practice squad. He signed a reserve/future contract with the Saints on January 2, 2017.

On September 2, 2017, Fullington was waived by the Saints and was signed to the practice squad the next day. He was promoted to the active roster on December 29, 2017.

On August 5, 2018, Fullington was waived/injured by the Saints and placed on injured reserve. He was released on August 10, 2018.

== Current occupation ==
From 2018 through 2023, he was a physical education teacher and the head football coach at Hawkins Middle School (North Mason School District, Belfair, Washington). "I've always wanted to be a gym teacher" states John Fullington. As of August 2023, he is a strength development teacher at North Mason High School. On January 22, 2024, he was named the head football coach at North Mason High School.
