= Kelvin Palmer =

American gridiron football player (born 1990)

No. 69, 68, 70, 63, 77
- Position: Offensive tackle

Personal information
- Born: October 23, 1990 (age 36); Dallas, Texas, U.S.
- Listed height: 6 ft 4 in (1.93 m)
- Listed weight: 290 lb (132 kg)

Career information
- College: Baylor
- NFL draft: 2014: undrafted

Career history
- Arizona Cardinals (2014–2015)*; Kansas City Chiefs (2015)*; Pittsburgh Steelers (2015); BC Lions (2016); Tampa Bay Buccaneers (2016)*; BC Lions (2017); Edmonton Eskimos (2018)*; Hamilton Tiger-Cats (2018–2019); Houston Roughnecks (2020)
- * Offseason or practice squad member only
- Stats at Pro Football Reference
- Stats at CFL.ca

Kelvin Palmer (born October 23, 1990) is an American former professional football offensive tackle. He played for the BC Lions and Hamilton Tiger-Cats of the Canadian Football League (CFL), and the Houston Roughnecks of the XFL. Palmer played college football at Baylor University.

== Professional career ==
Palmer was placed on injured reserve by the Houston Roughnecks on February 17, 2020. He had his contract terminated when the league suspended operations on April 10, 2020.
