= Ryan Lindley =

American gridiron football player and coach (born 1989)

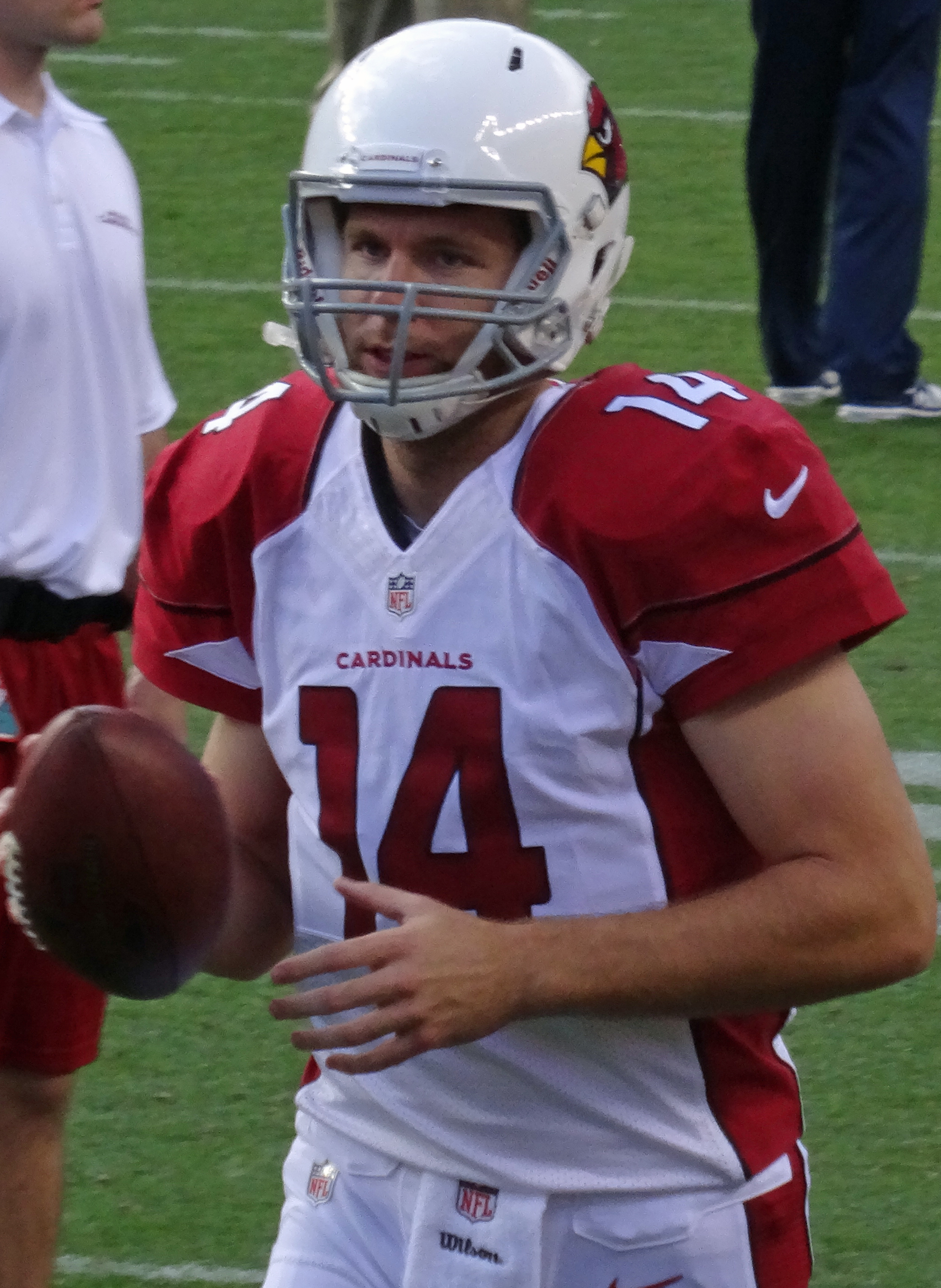
- Lindley with the Arizona Cardinals in 2013

San Diego State Aztecs
- Title: Senior offensive analyst

Personal information
- Born: June 22, 1989 (age 37); San Diego, California, U.S.
- Listed height: 6 ft 3 in (1.91 m)
- Listed weight: 232 lb (105 kg)

Career information
- Position: Quarterback (No. 14, 3)
- High school: El Capitan (Lakeside, California)
- College: San Diego State (2008–2011)
- NFL draft: 2012: 6th round, 185th overall pick

Career history

Playing
- Arizona Cardinals (2012–2013); San Diego Chargers (2014)*; Arizona Cardinals (2014); New England Patriots (2015)*; Indianapolis Colts (2015); Ottawa Redblacks (2017)
- * Offseason or practice squad member only

Coaching
- San Diego State (2017–2018) Graduate assistant; Cleveland Browns (2018) Running backs coach; Cleveland Browns (2019) Quarterbacks coach; Utah (2020) Offensive analyst; Mississippi State (2021–2022) Defensive analyst; San Diego State (2022) Quarterbacks coach; San Diego State (2023) Offensive coordinator & quarterbacks coach; San Diego State (2024–present) Senior offensive analyst

Awards and highlights
- Second-team All-MW (2010)

Career NFL statistics
- Passing attempts: 274
- Passing completions: 140
- Completion percentage: 51.1%
- TD–INT: 3–11
- Passing yards: 1,372
- Passer rating: 52.4
- Stats at Pro Football Reference
- Stats at CFL.ca

Ryan George Lindley (born June 22, 1989) is an American football coach and former quarterback who is currently the senior offensive analyst at San Diego State University. He played college football for the San Diego State Aztecs, and was selected by the Arizona Cardinals in the sixth round of the 2012 NFL draft. Lindley also played for the Indianapolis Colts of the NFL, and the Ottawa Redblacks of the Canadian Football League (CFL).

== Early life ==
Ryan George Lindley was born on June 22, 1989, in San Diego, California. He attended El Capitan High School in Lakeside, California. As a senior, he threw for 3,521 yards and 35 touchdowns.

== College career ==
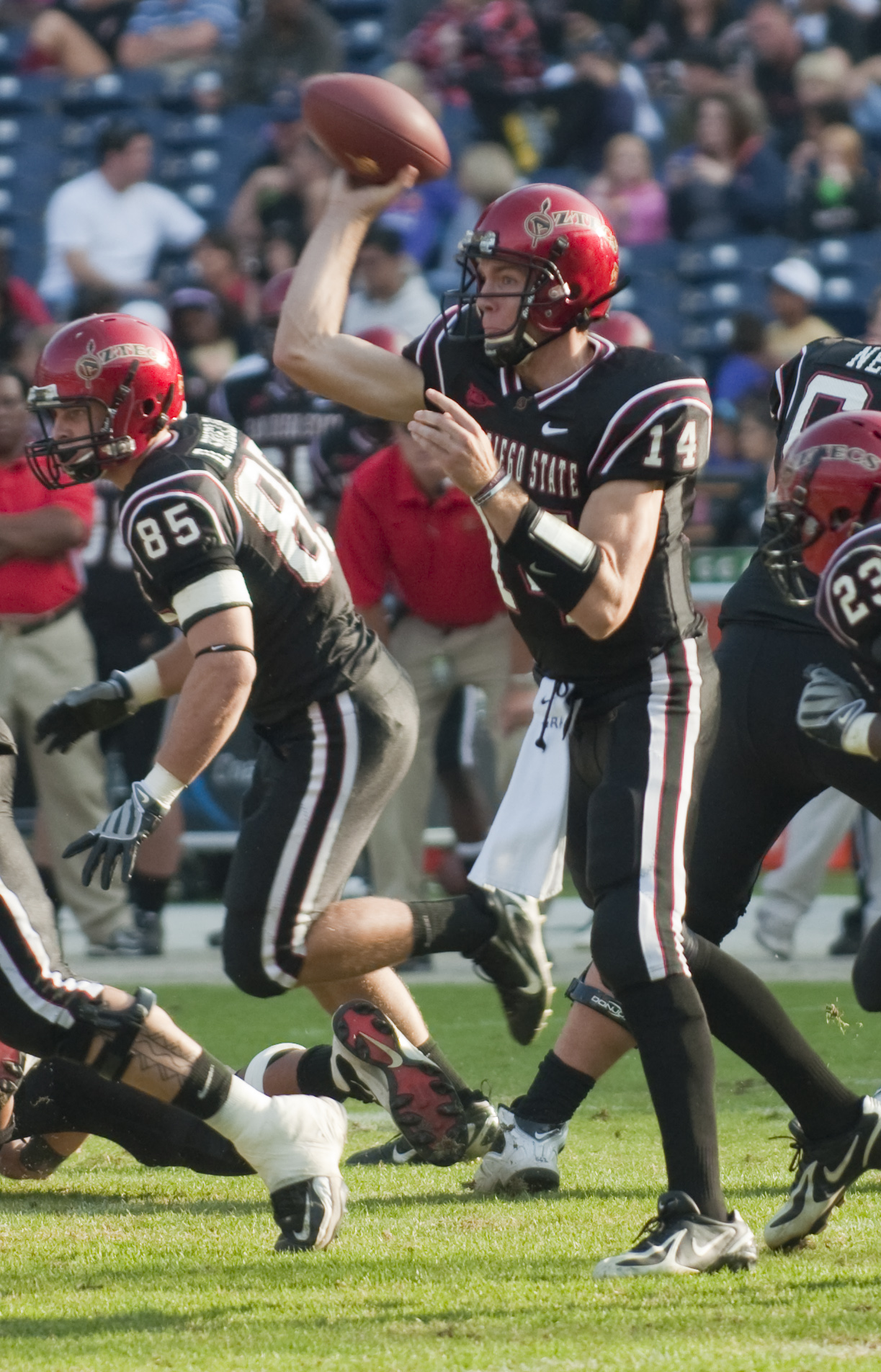
Lindley while at San Diego State

After not playing in his first year on campus at San Diego State University in 2007 while Kevin O'Connell was the Aztecs' starter, Lindley started 11 games as a redshirt freshman in 2008. During the season, he completed 242 of 427 passes for 2,653 yards, 16 touchdowns and nine interceptions. As a sophomore in 2009 he started 12 games and completed 239 of 437 passes for 3,054 yards with 23 touchdowns and 16 interceptions. As a junior in 2010 Lindley completed 243 of 421 passes for 3,830 yards, 28 touchdowns and 14 interceptions. He helped lead the Aztecs to the 2010 Poinsettia Bowl, their first Bowl game since the 1998 Las Vegas Bowl. He helped them defeat the Navy Midshipmen 35 to 14 after completing 18 of 23 passes for 276 yards and two touchdowns.

== Professional career ==
Pre-draft measurables
Height	Weight	Arm length	Hand span	Wingspan	40-yard dash	10-yard split	20-yard split	20-yard shuttle	Three-cone drill	Vertical jump	Broad jump
6 ft 3 3/4 in (1.92 m)	229 lb (104 kg)	32 5/8 in (0.83 m)	10 in (0.25 m)	6 ft 5 5/8 in (1.97 m)	4.90 s	1.69 s	2.87 s	4.45 s	7.52 s	29.5 in (0.75 m)	9 ft 0 in (2.74 m)
All values from NFL Combine

=== Arizona Cardinals (first stint) ===
Lindley was drafted in the sixth round of the 2012 NFL draft by the Arizona Cardinals of the National Football League (NFL). On November 18, 2012, he replaced John Skelton in a loss to the Atlanta Falcons. He made his first professional start on November 25 against the St. Louis Rams. In his first season, he posted a very low 46.7 passer rating and threw 7 interceptions compared to 0 touchdowns. After two seasons with the team, Lindley was released by the Cardinals on August 25, 2014.

=== San Diego Chargers ===
Lindley signed with the San Diego Chargers and was assigned to their practice squad on August 31, 2014.

=== Arizona Cardinals (second stint) ===
On November 11, 2014, Lindley re-signed with the Cardinals after a season-ending injury to Carson Palmer. On December 11, 2014, starting quarterback Drew Stanton was injured in the game against the Rams, Lindley entered the game and saw his first in-game action since 2012. On December 28, 2014, against the San Francisco 49ers, Lindley threw his first career touchdown pass to Michael Floyd, ending an NFL-record 228 pass attempts without a touchdown to start his career. He finished the 2014 season with a 48.4% completion rate, 562 yards passing, 2 touchdowns, 4 interceptions, and a 56.8 passer rating.

On January 3, 2015, in the Cardinals' first-round playoff game at the Carolina Panthers, Lindley completed 16 of 28 passes for 82 yards, one touchdown and two interceptions. He had a passer rating of 44.3 and Arizona lost 27–16. The Cardinals totaled 78 yards of offense, the fewest in NFL playoff history.

=== New England Patriots ===
On August 10, 2015, Lindley agreed to terms with the New England Patriots. Ryan started the last preseason game against the New York Giants on September 3. He was released September 4, 2015, during final cuts to 53.

=== Indianapolis Colts ===
On December 29, 2015, Lindley signed with the Indianapolis Colts. On January 3, 2016, Lindley split time with fellow recent signee Josh Freeman in the Colts season finale against the Tennessee Titans and went 6/10 for 58 yards and a touchdown in the 30–24 win.

=== Ottawa Redblacks ===
After not playing professional football for more than a year, Lindley signed with the Ottawa Redblacks of the Canadian Football League (CFL) on February 2, 2017. Lindley saw the most action during the preseason for the Redblacks; he completed 18 of 30 pass attempts for 140 yards with 1 touchdown and 0 interceptions. Lindley made his first CFL start on September 22, 2017: Starting quarterback Trevor Harris and backup Drew Tate were both out with injuries. Lindley played poorly, completing just 16 of 36 pass attempts (44.4%) for only 151 yards (4.2 yards per attempt), with one interception and the Redblacks were beaten handily by the Winnipeg Blue Bombers 29–9. In his next start against the Saskatchewan Roughriders, Lindley completed 17 of 31 pass attempts (54.8%) for 161 yards (5.2 yards per attempt), with one touchdown and one interception. He also served as Ottawa's short-yardage quarterback during the 2017 season, rushing 47 times for 74 yards and five touchdowns. On March 6, 2018, Lindley was released by the Redblacks.

== Career statistics ==
=== NFL ===
Regular season
Year	Team	Games			Passing								Rushing				Sacks		Fumbles (Note: Fumbles lost data taken from Pro Football Reference career game log)	
Year	Team	GP	GS	Record	Cmp	Att	Pct	Yds	Y/A	TD	Int	Rtg	Att	Yds	Avg	TD	Sck	SckY	Fum	Lost
2012	ARI	6	4	1–3	89	171	52.0	752	4.4	0	7	46.7	4	7	1.8	0	12	91	3	2
2013	ARI	0	0	–	DNP															
2014	ARI	3	2	0–2	45	93	48.4	562	6.0	2	4	56.8	0	0	0.0	0	6	46	1	0
2015	IND	1	0	–	6	10	60.0	58	5.8	1	0	109.6	0	0	0.0	0	0	0	0	0
Career		10	6	1–5	140	274	51.1	1,372	5.0	3	11	52.4	4	7	1.8	0	18	137	4	2

Postseason
Year	Team	Games			Passing								Rushing				Sacks		Fumbles	
Year	Team	GP	GS	Record	Cmp	Att	Pct	Yds	Y/A	TD	Int	Rtg	Att	Yds	Avg	TD	Sck	SckY	Fum	Lost
2014	ARI	1	1	0–1	16	28	57.1	82	2.9	1	2	44.3	0	0	0.0	0	4	31	1	0
Career		1	1	0–1	16	28	57.1	82	2.9	1	2	44.3	0	0	0.0	0	4	31	1	0

=== CFL ===
Regular season
Year	Team	GP	GS	Passing								Rushing			
Year	Team	GP	GS	Cmp	Att	Pct	Yds	Y/A	TD	Int	Rtg	Att	Yds	Avg	TD
2017	OTT	18	2	40	81	49.4	391	4.8	1	3	52.0	47	74	1.6	5
Career		18	2	40	81	49.4	391	4.8	1	3	52.0	47	74	1.6	5

=== College ===
Season	Team	Passing								Rushing			
Season	Team	Cmp	Att	Pct	Yds	Y/A	TD	Int	Rtg	Att	Yds	Avg	TD
2008	San Diego State	242	427	56.7	2,653	6.2	16	9	117.0	31	-62	-2.0	1
2009	San Diego State	239	437	54.7	3,054	7.0	23	16	123.4	22	-131	-6.0	1
2010	San Diego State	243	421	57.7	3,830	9.1	28	14	149.4	19	-31	-1.6	0
2011	San Diego State	237	447	53.0	3,153	7.1	23	8	125.7	18	-51	-2.8	0
Career		961	1,732	55.5	12,690	7.3	90	47	128.8	90	-275	-3.1	2

== Coaching career ==
=== San Diego State (first stint) ===
Lindley was a graduate assistant at his alma mater, San Diego State from 2017 through October 31, 2018.

=== Cleveland Browns ===
Lindley was hired as the running backs coach for the Cleveland Browns on October 31, 2018, after running backs coach Freddie Kitchens was promoted to offensive coordinator. On January 14, 2019, he was named the Browns' quarterbacks coach.

=== Utah ===
In 2020, Lindley worked as an offensive analyst for the Utah.

=== Mississippi State ===
In 2021, Lindley joined Mississippi State as a defensive analyst.

=== San Diego State (second stint) ===
Lindley was named the quarterbacks coach at San Diego State on October 2, 2022. He became the offensive coordinator in 2023. He became senior offensive analyst in 2024.

== Personal life ==
After being released by the Colts, Lindley's agent, Rep 1 Sports, hired him as a coach. He was tasked with getting Carson Wentz and Jared Goff ready for their NFL Combine and Pro Day performances. In 2014, Lindley was a stand-in body double for Andrew Luck in a Visa commercial that featured Cardinals teammate Larry Fitzgerald. The commercial also featured Drew Brees and Colin Kaepernick through CGI. At San Diego State University, Lindley majored in Social Science Teaching.

== See also ==
- List of Division I FBS passing yardage leaders
