= Josh Bynes =

American football player (born 1989)

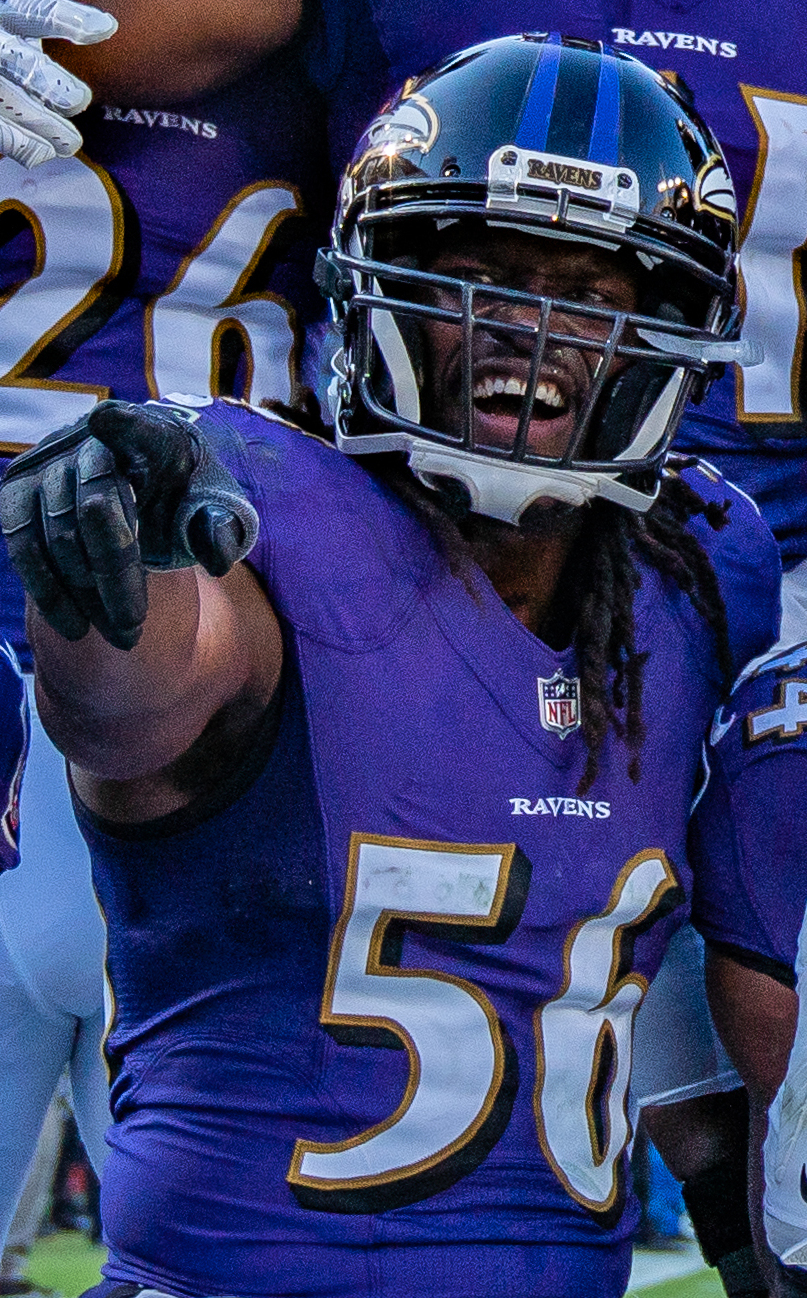
- Bynes with the Baltimore Ravens in 2021

Seattle Seahawks
- Title: Outside linebackers coach

Personal information
- Born: August 24, 1989 (age 37); Lauderdale Lakes, Florida, U.S.
- Listed height: 6 ft 1 in (1.85 m)
- Listed weight: 235 lb (107 kg)

Career information
- Position: Linebacker (No. 49, 56, 57)
- High school: Boyd H. Anderson (Lauderdale Lakes)
- College: Auburn
- NFL draft: 2011: undrafted

Career history

Playing
- Baltimore Ravens (2011–2014); Detroit Lions (2014–2016); Arizona Cardinals (2017–2018); Baltimore Ravens (2019); Cincinnati Bengals (2020); Carolina Panthers (2021)*; Baltimore Ravens (2021–2022)
- * Offseason or practice squad member only

Coaching
- Seattle Seahawks (2024–2025) Defensive assistant; Seattle Seahawks (2026–present) Outside linebackers coach

Awards and highlights
- Playing: Super Bowl champion (XLVII); BCS national champion (2011); Second-team All-SEC (2010); Coaching: Super Bowl champion (LX)

Career NFL statistics
- Total tackles: 582
- Sacks: 8.5
- Forced fumbles: 3
- Fumble recoveries: 3
- Interceptions: 5
- Defensive touchdowns: 1
- Stats at Pro Football Reference

Joshua Bynes (born August 24, 1989) is an American professional football coach and former linebacker. He is currently the outside linebackers coach for the Seattle Seahawks of the National Football League (NFL). He was signed by the Baltimore Ravens as an undrafted free agent in 2011. He was also a member of the Detroit Lions, Arizona Cardinals, Cincinnati Bengals, and Carolina Panthers. He played college football for the Auburn Tigers, where he was a key member of their 2010 national championship team.

== Early life and college ==
Bynes grew up in Florida and went to college at Auburn, where he played college football. Bynes anchored the middle of the Auburn defense for three consecutive years, garnering Second-team All-SEC honors as a senior. As a senior, he recorded a team high 73 total tackles and helped lead Auburn to a national championship victory.

== Professional career ==
Pre-draft measurables
Height	Weight	Arm length	Hand span	40-yard dash	10-yard split	20-yard split	20-yard shuttle	Three-cone drill	Vertical jump	Broad jump	Bench press
6 ft 1 5/8 in (1.87 m)	240 lb (109 kg)	31 5/8 in (0.80 m)	9 5/8 in (0.24 m)	4.81 s	1.68 s	2.77 s	4.32 s	7.11 s	33.0 in (0.84 m)	9 ft 8 in (2.95 m)	21 reps
All values from Auburn's Pro Day

=== Baltimore Ravens (first stint) ===
==== 2011 ====
Bynes went undrafted in the 2011 NFL draft. On July 28, 2011, the Baltimore Ravens signed Bynes to a three-year, $1.41 million contract as an undrafted free agent.

Throughout training camp, Bynes competed for a roster spot as a backup linebacker and special teams player against Tavares Gooden, Jason Phillips, Anthony Leon, and Chavis Williams. Bynes received minimal playing time in the Ravens' first three preseason games. On September 1, 2011, Bynes received an opportunity to play in the Ravens' preseason finale and recorded six solo tackles and two sacks in their 21–7 victory at the Atlanta Falcons. On September 3, 2011, the Baltimore Ravens released Bynes as part of their final roster cuts.

“Yeah, Josh made a case for himself. He played very well. We have been impressed with him all through camp. He hasn’t had as many opportunities in games, but then last night he showed up.”

— John Harbaugh
Baltimore Ravens' head coach (2011)

Bynes received numerous tryouts, but did not receive any contract offers. On November 9, 2011, the Baltimore Ravens signed Bynes to their practice squad after linebackers Ray Lewis and Dannell Ellerbe sustained injuries. On November 23, 2011, the Baltimore Ravens added Bynes to their active roster. On November 24, 2011, Bynes made his professional regular season debut during a 16–6 victory against the San Francisco 49ers in Week 12. On November 29, 2011, the Baltimore Ravens officially released Bynes after Ray Lewis recovered from his toe injury and re-signed him to their practice squad. On January 14, 2012, the Baltimore Ravens added Bynes to their active roster, but did not activate him for any games during the playoffs.

==== 2012 ====
On April 16, 2012, the Baltimore Ravens signed Bynes to a one-year, $390,000 exclusive rights tender. During training camp, Bynes was expected to compete for a roster spot as a backup inside linebacker against Brendon Ayanbadejo, Ricky Brown, Darryl Blackstock, and Nigel Carr. Bynes sustained a cracked vertebrae during the beginning of training camp during a goal line scrimmage and was expected to miss four or five weeks.

On October 17, 2012, the Ravens added Bynes to the active roster after Ray Lewis tore his triceps and was placed on injured reserve for the remainder of the regular season. Upon joining the active roster, Bynes was named a backup inside linebacker behind Dannell Ellerbe and Jameel McClain.

On December 16, 2012, Bynes earned his first career start and recorded a season-high 13 combined tackles (11 solo) and deflected a pass during a 34–17 loss to the Denver Broncos in Week 15. Bynes was named the starting inside linebacker after Jameel McClain suffered a spinal cord contusion during the Ravens' Week 14. Bynes finished the 2012 season with 34 combined tackles (19 solo) and a pass deflection in ten games and three starts.

The Ravens finished first in the AFC North with a 10–6 record. On January 6, 2013, Bynes appeared in his first career playoff game during a 24–9 win against the Indianapolis Colts in the AFC Wildcard Game. The Baltimore Ravens reached Super Bowl XLVII after they defeated the Denver Broncos 38–35 in the AFC Divisional Round and the New England Patriots 28–13 in the AFC Championship Game. On February 3, 2013, Bynes recorded one tackle as the Ravens defeated the San Francisco 49ers 34–31 in Super Bowl XLVII. Bynes tackled Ted Ginn Jr. after a free kick in the final seconds of the game to clinch the Ravens' 34–31 victory.

==== 2013 ====
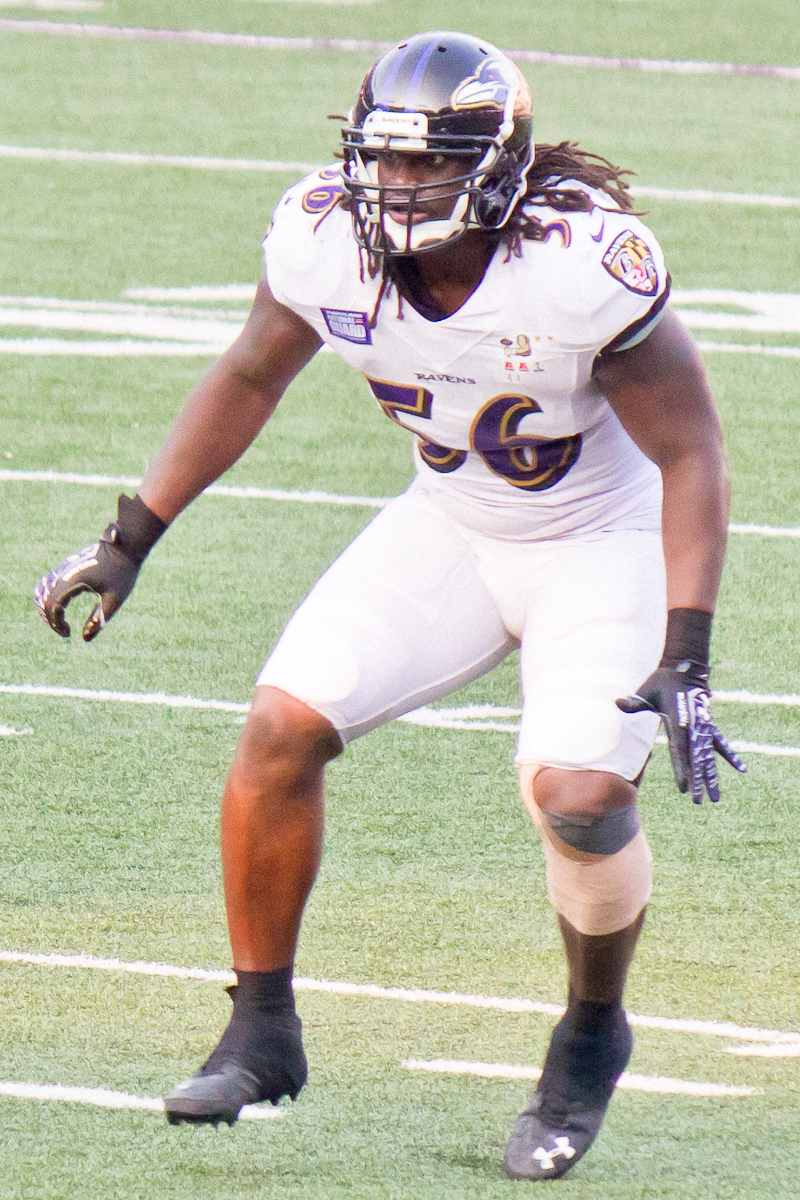
Bynes at a Ravens practice at M&T Bank Stadium in August 2013.

On April 22, 2013, the Baltimore Ravens signed Bynes to a one-year, $480,000 exclusive rights tender. Bynes entered training camp slated as a starting inside linebacker after Ray Lewis announced his retirement and Dannell Ellerbe departed in free agency. He saw competition for the role from Arthur Brown. Head coach John Harbaugh named Bynes a starting inside linebacker to start the regular season, alongside Daryl Smith and outside linebackers Elvis Dumervil and Terrell Suggs.

In Week 4, he collected a season-high nine combined tackles during a 23–20 loss at the Buffalo Bills. Bynes was inactive for the Ravens' Week 7 loss at the Pittsburgh Steelers due to thigh injury and infection in his finger. He was subsequently replaced by Jameel McClain and lost his starting position to him during his absence. He finished the season with 45 combined tackles (22 solo) and three pass deflections in 15 games and six starts.

==== 2014 ====
On March 11, 2014, the Baltimore Ravens placed a one-year, $570,000 exclusive rights tender on Bynes for the 2014 NFL season. On April 18, 2014, Bynes signed his exclusive rights tender with the Baltimore Ravens.

Bynes entered training camp as a backup inside linebacker after the Ravens drafted C. J. Mosley in the first round of the 2014 NFL draft. Bynes competed for job ats a backup inside linebacker against Albert McClellan and Arthur Brown. On September 2, 2014, the Baltimore Ravens waived Bynes as part of their final roster cuts. On September 4, 2014, the Baltimore Ravens signed Bynes to their practice squad.

=== Detroit Lions ===
==== 2014 ====
On September 22, 2014, Bynes was signed off of the Ravens' practice squad onto the Lions' active roster following injuries. Bynes was reunited with Detroit Lions' head coach Jim Caldwell who was previously the offensive coordinator with the Baltimore Ravens. He was subsequently named a backup outside linebacker behind Ashlee Palmer and DeAndre Levy. On November 16, 2014, Bynes collected a season-high four combined tackles and made his first career interception off a pass by Cardinals' quarterback Drew Stanton during a 14–6 loss at the Arizona Cardinals in Week 11. He finished the 2014 NFL season with 22 combined tackles (18 solo), a pass deflection, and an interception in 13 games and zero starts.

==== 2015 ====
On March 10, 2015, the Detroit Lions re-signed Bynes to a two-year, $1.81 million contract that includes a signing bonus of $250,000. Throughout training camp, Bynes competed to be a starting outside linebacker against Tahir Whitehead and rookie Kyle Van Noy. Head coach Jim Caldwell named Bynes a starting outside linebacker to start the 2015 regular season after DeAndre Levy sustained a hip injury during practice. He started alongside Tahir Whitehead and middle linebacker Stephen Tulloch. In Week 6, he collected a season-high 11 combined tackles (nine solo) during a 37–34 win against the Chicago Bears. Bynes finished the 2015 season with a career-high 82 combined tackles (56 solo), five pass deflections, and was credited with half a sack in 16 games and 11 starts.

==== 2016 ====
Bynes entered training camp slated as a backup linebacker after DeAndre Levy returned from his injury. On August 18, 2016, Bynes sustained a knee injury during the Lions' 30–14 loss to the Cincinnati Bengals in their second preseason game. On September 4, 2016, the Detroit Lions placed Bynes on injured reserve due to his knee injury. On September 10, 2016, the Detroit Lions officially released Bynes after they agreed to an injury settlement.

On October 25, 2016, the Detroit Lions signed Bynes after they traded Kyle Van Noy to the New England Patriots. Head coach Jim Caldwell named Bynes a starting outside linebacker. On December 4, 2016, he collected a season-high eight combined tackles (five solo) and broke up a pass during a 28–13 win at the New Orleans Saints. He finished the 2016 NFL season with 38 combined tackles (26 solo) and four pass deflections in nine games and eight starts.

The Detroit Lions finished second in the NFC North with a 9–7 record and earned a Wild Card berth On January 7, 2017, Bynes started in his first career playoff game and recorded seven combined tackles in their 26–6 loss at the Seattle Seahawks in the NFC Wild Card Round.

=== Arizona Cardinals ===
==== 2017 ====
On August 5, 2017, the Arizona Cardinals signed Bynes to a one-year, $775,000 contract at the league's veteran minimum. Throughout training camp, Bynes competed for a job as a starting inside linebacker against Haason Reddick, Scooby Wright, Zaviar Gooden, and Philip Wheeler. Head coach Bruce Arians named Bynes a backup inside linebacker to begin the regular season in 2017, behind Deone Bucannon and Karlos Dansby.

On November 25, 2017, Bynes collected a season-high nine combined tackles in the Cardinals' 27–24 victory against the Jacksonville Jaguars in Week 12. The following week, he tied his season-high of eight solo tackles during a 32–16 loss to the Los Angeles Rams. On December 10, 2017, Bynes recorded a solo tackle, deflected a pass, and made his first career interception in the Cardinals' 12–7 win against the Tennessee Titans in Week 14. Bynes made his second career interception off a pass attempt by Titans' quarterback Marcus Mariota, that was originally intended for tight end Delanie Walker, and returned it for a 25-yard gain in the fourth quarter. On December 17, 2017, Bynes recorded two tackles before exiting in the fourth quarter of the Cardinals' 20–15 loss at the Washington Redskins due to an ankle injury. He was inactive for the next two games (Weeks 16–17) due to a sprained ankle. He finished the 2017 NFL season with 36 combined tackles (31 solo), three pass deflections, one interception, and a sack in 14 games and one start.

==== 2018 ====
On March 13, 2018, the Arizona Cardinals signed Bynes to a three-year, $5.57 million contract that includes $1.25 million guaranteed and a signing bonus of $1 million.

The Arizona Cardinals opted to change their base defense from a 3-4 defense to a 4-3 defense. Bynes entered training camp slated as the starting middle linebacker, but saw minor competition for the role from Scooby Wright. Head coach Steve Wilks named Bynes the starting middle linebacker to begin the season, alongside outside linebackers Haasan Reddick and Deone Bucannon.

He started in the Arizona Cardinals' season-opener against the Washington Redskins and recorded 11 combined tackles (eight solo) in their 24–6 loss. He started 11 games before suffering a thumb injury in Week 12. He was placed on injured reserve on November 26, 2018.

On March 5, 2019, Bynes was released by the Cardinals.

=== Baltimore Ravens (second stint) ===
On October 2, 2019, Bynes was signed by the Ravens. Four days later, during a week 5 game against the Pittsburgh Steelers, Bynes intercepted a pass thrown by running back Jaylen Samuels in the 26–23 win.

=== Cincinnati Bengals ===
On March 25, 2020, the Cincinnati Bengals signed Bynes to a one-year contract. He started all 16 games in 2020, recording a career-high 99 tackles, 1.0 sack, and two passes defensed.

=== Carolina Panthers ===
On August 11, 2021, Bynes was signed by the Carolina Panthers. On August 31, 2021, Bynes was released by the Panthers during final roster cuts.

=== Baltimore Ravens (third stint) ===
One day after being released by the Panthers, Bynes signed with the Ravens' practice squad. On September 28, 2021, Bynes was promoted to the active roster.

On April 8, 2022, the Ravens re-signed Bynes to a one-year contract. He was named a starting inside linebacker alongside Patrick Queen. He started the first seven games, but lost his starting job after the acquisition of Roquan Smith. He was a healthy scratch the next seven games before being released on December 23, 2022. He was re-signed to the practice squad on December 27. His practice squad contract with the team expired after the season on January 15, 2023.

=== Retirement ===
On December 8, 2023, Bynes signed a one-day contract to officially retire a member of the Baltimore Ravens.

== NFL career statistics ==
Year	Team	Games		Tackles					Interceptions					Fumbles			
Year	Team	G	GS	Comb	Solo	Ast	Sack	Sfty	Int	Yds	Lng	TD	PD	FF	FR	Yds	TD
2011	BAL	1	0	0	0	0	0.0	0	0	0	0	0	0	0	0	0	0
2012	BAL	10	3	34	19	15	0.0	0	0	0	0	0	1	0	0	0	0
2013	BAL	15	6	45	22	23	0.0	0	0	0	0	0	3	0	0	0	0
2014	DET	13	0	22	18	4	0.0	0	1	17	17	0	1	0	1	0	0
2015	DET	16	11	82	56	26	0.5	0	0	0	0	0	5	1	0	0	0
2016	DET	9	8	38	26	12	0.0	0	0	0	0	0	4	0	0	0	0
2017	ARI	14	1	36	31	5	1.0	0	1	25	25	0	3	2	0	0	0
2018	ARI	11	11	75	52	23	2.0	0	0	0	0	0	5	0	1	23	1
2019	BAL	12	7	46	23	23	1.0	0	2	7	6	0	4	0	0	0	0
2020	CIN	16	16	99	53	46	1.0	0	0	0	0	0	2	0	1	0	0
2021	BAL	14	12	76	50	26	2.0	0	0	0	0	0	4	0	0	0	0
Career		131	75	553	350	203	7.5	0	4	49	25	0	32	3	3	23	1

== Coaching career ==
In February 2024, the Seattle Seahawks announced the hiring of Bynes as their defensive assistant/linebackers coach as part of head coach Mike Macdonald's initial coaching staff. Bynes previously played under Macdonald during both their time with the Ravens. He was part of the coaching staff that won Super Bowl LX over the New England Patriots 29–13.
