= 2017 Arizona Cardinals season =

98th season in franchise history

- Owner: Bill Bidwill
- General manager: Steve Keim
- Head coach: Bruce Arians
- Home stadium: University of Phoenix Stadium

Results
- Record: 8–8
- Division place: 3rd NFC West
- Playoffs: Did not qualify
- Pro Bowlers: LB Chandler Jones; WR Larry Fitzgerald; ST Budda Baker; CB Patrick Peterson

Uniform
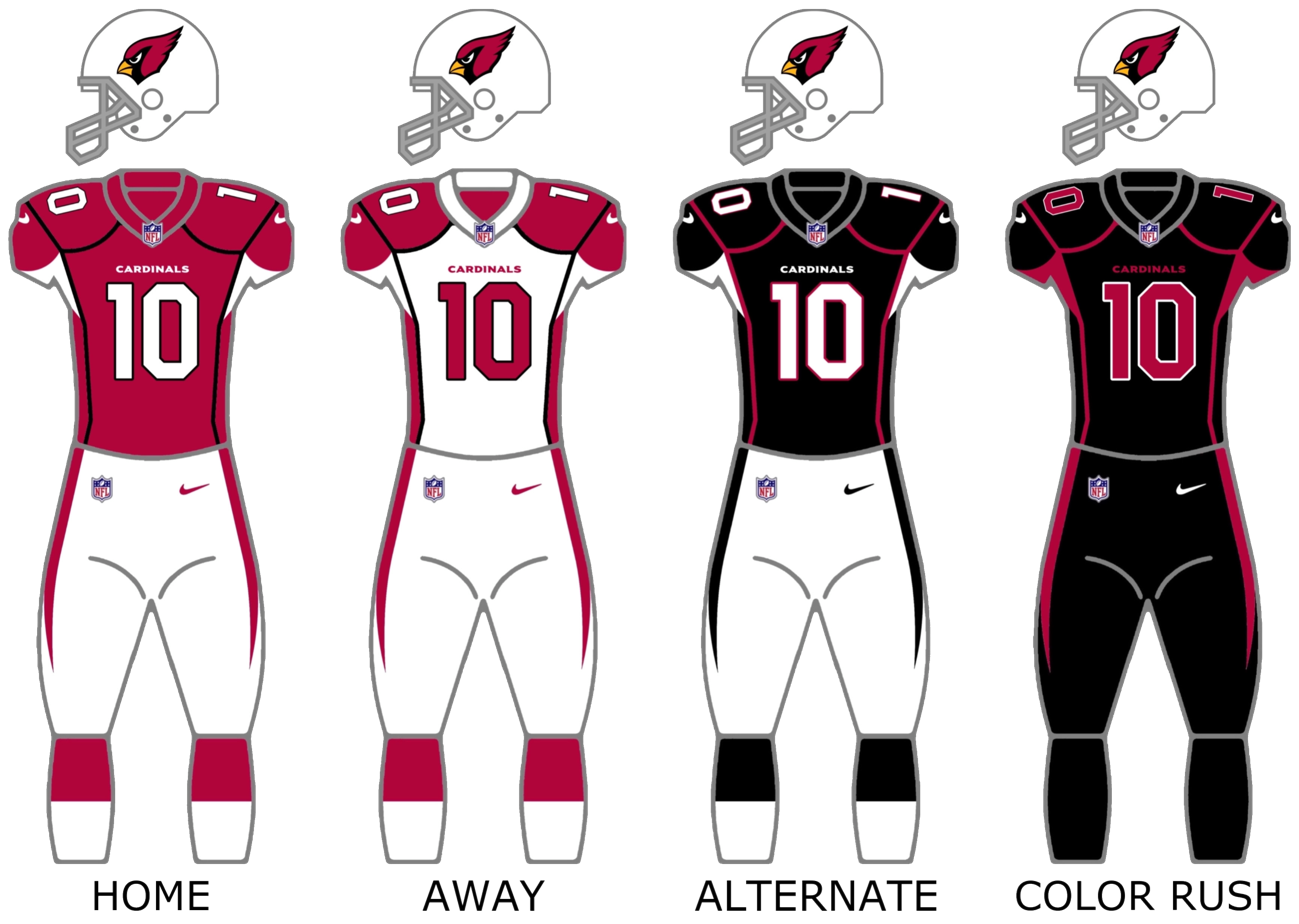

The 2017 season was the Arizona Cardinals' 98th in the National Football League (NFL), their 30th in Arizona and their 12th at University of Phoenix Stadium. It was also the fifth and final season under head coach Bruce Arians. The Cardinals played one road game in London at Twickenham Stadium against the Los Angeles Rams as one of the NFL London Games. They improved on a 7–8–1 season they had in 2016, finishing 8–8 as they spent most of the season alternating between wins and losses. However, they missed the playoffs for the second straight season.

== Offseason ==
=== Signings ===
Position	Player	Age	2016 Team	Contract
S	Antoine Bethea	32	San Francisco 49ers	3 years, $12.75 million
K	Phil Dawson	42	San Francisco 49ers	2 years, $6 million
LB	Jarvis Jones	27	Pittsburgh Steelers	1 year, $2.2 million
DE	Frostee Rucker	33	Arizona Cardinals	1 year, $1 million
RB	Andre Ellington	28	Arizona Cardinals	1 year, $905,000

=== Departures ===
Position	Player	Age	2017 Team	Contract
DE/DT	Calais Campbell	30	Jacksonville Jaguars	4 years, $60 million

== Draft ==
2017 Arizona Cardinals Draft
Round	Selection	Player	Position	College
1	13	Haason Reddick	LB	Temple
2	36	Budda Baker	S	Washington
3	98	Chad Williams	WR	Grambling State
4	120	Dorian Johnson	OG	Pittsburgh
5	157	Will Holden	OT	Vanderbilt
5	179	T. J. Logan	RB	North Carolina
6	208	Johnathan Ford	S	Auburn

Notes

- The Cardinals received one compensatory selection — No. 179 overall.

== Staff ==
2017 Arizona Cardinals staff
Front office: Owner/chairman – Bill Bidwill; President – Michael Bidwill; General manager – Steve Keim; Vice president of player personnel – Terry McDonough; Director of college scouting – Dru Grigson; Director of pro scouting – Quentin Harris; Director of football administration – Mike Disner; Director of football operations – Matt Caracciolo; Head coaches: Head coach – Bruce Arians; Assistant head coach/offense – Tom Moore; Offensive coaches: Offensive coordinator/offensive line – Harold Goodwin; Quarterbacks – Byron Leftwich; Running backs – Freddie Kitchens; Wide receivers – Darryl Drake; Tight ends – Rick Christophel; Assistant tight ends/assistant special teams – Steve Heiden; Assistant offensive line – Larry Zierlein; Offensive assistant – Kevin Garver	Defensive coaches: Defensive coordinator – James Bettcher; Defensive line – Brentson Buckner; Outside linebackers – Bob Sanders; Inside linebackers – Larry Foote; Defensive backs – Nick Rapone; Cornerbacks – Kevin Ross; Defensive assistant/defensive backs – Mike Chiurco; Pass rush specialist – Tom Pratt; Special teams coaches: Special teams coordinator – Amos Jones; Assistant special teams – Anthony Blevins; Strength and conditioning: Strength and conditioning – Buddy Morris; Assistant strength and conditioning – Roger Kingdom

== Final roster ==
2017 Arizona Cardinals roster
Quarterbacks (QB): 9 Matt Barkley; 7 Blaine Gabbert; 5 Drew Stanton; Running backs (RB): 37 D. J. Foster; 48 Bronson Hill; 35 Elijhaa Penny; 33 Kerwynn Williams; Wide receivers (WR): 13 Jaron Brown; 12 John Brown; 11 Larry Fitzgerald; 14 J. J. Nelson; 16 Chad Williams; Tight ends (TE): 84 Jermaine Gresham; 87 Troy Niklas; 86 Ricky Seals-Jones; 85 Gabe Holmes	Offensive linemen (OL): 64 Khalif Barnes T; 70 Evan Boehm G; 75 Alex Boone G; 69 Will Holden G/T; 78 Vinston Painter T; 53 A. Q. Shipley C; 79 Max Tuerk C; 71 Earl Watford G; 73 John Wetzel T; Defensive linemen (DL): 95 Rodney Gunter; 97 Josh Mauro DE; 90 Robert Nkemdiche DE; 98 Corey Peters NT; 72 Olsen Pierre DE; 92 Frostee Rucker DE; 94 Xavier Williams DE	Linebackers (LB): 54 Bryson Albright OLB; 20 Deone Bucannon ILB; 57 Josh Bynes ILB; 56 Karlos Dansby ILB; 55 Chandler Jones OLB; 50 Gabe Martin ILB; 96 Kareem Martin OLB; 43 Haason Reddick ILB; 49 Edmond Robinson OLB; 58 Scooby Wright ILB; Defensive backs (DB): 36 Budda Baker FS; 28 Justin Bethel CB; 42 C. J. Goodwin CB; 32 Tyrann Mathieu FS; 34 Harlan Miller FS; 21 Patrick Peterson CB; 26 Brandon Williams CB; 25 Tramon Williams CB; Special teams (ST): 46 Aaron Brewer LS; 4 Phil Dawson K; 2 Andy Lee P	Practice squad: 19 Carlton Agudosi WR (IR); 63 Peli Anau DE; 39 Jarell Carter CB; 81 Anthony Denham TE (IR); 47 K. J. Dillon SS; 59 Vontarrius Dora OLB; 45 Jonathan Moxey CB; 91 Earl Okine DE; 17 Rashad Ross WR; 15 Alonzo Russell WR; 65 Pasoni Tasini NT; 38 Darius Victor RB; Reserve: 41 Antoine Bethea SS (IR); 27 Tyvon Branch SS (IR); 30 Rudy Ford FS (IR); 10 Brittan Golden WR (IR); 44 Markus Golden OLB (IR); 74 D. J. Humphries T (IR); 76 Mike Iupati G (IR); 31 David Johnson RB (IR); 22 T. J. Logan RB (IR); 80 Ifeanyi Momah TE (IR); 62 Daniel Munyer C (IR); 3 Carson Palmer QB (IR); 23 Adrian Peterson RB (IR); 68 Jared Veldheer T (IR); 29 Ronald Zamort CB (IR); Rookies in italics 53 active, 17 reserve, 10 practice squad

== Preseason ==
Week	Date	Opponent	Result	Record	Venue	Recap
HOF	August 3	vs. Dallas Cowboys	L 18–20	0–1	Tom Benson Hall of Fame Stadium (Canton, Ohio)	Recap
1	August 12	Oakland Raiders	W 20–10	1–1	University of Phoenix Stadium	Recap
2	August 19	Chicago Bears	L 23–24	1–2	University of Phoenix Stadium	Recap
3	August 26	at Atlanta Falcons	W 24–14	2–2	Mercedes-Benz Stadium	Recap
4	August 31	at Denver Broncos	L 2–30	2–3	Sports Authority Field at Mile High	Recap

== Regular season ==
=== Schedule ===
Week	Date	Opponent	Result	Record	Venue	Recap
1	September 10	at Detroit Lions	**L** 23–35	0–1	Ford Field	Recap
2	September 17	at Indianapolis Colts	**W** 16–13 (OT)	1–1	Lucas Oil Stadium	Recap
3	September 25	Dallas Cowboys	**L** 17–28	1–2	University of Phoenix Stadium	Recap
4	October 1	**San Francisco 49ers**	**W** 18–15 (OT)	2–2	University of Phoenix Stadium	Recap
5	October 8	at Philadelphia Eagles	**L** 7–34	2–3	Lincoln Financial Field	Recap
6	October 15	Tampa Bay Buccaneers	**W** 38–33	3–3	University of Phoenix Stadium	Recap
7	October 22	at **Los Angeles Rams**	**L** 0–33	3–4	(United Kingdom) Twickenham Stadium (London)	Recap
8	Bye					
9	November 5	at **San Francisco 49ers**	**W** 20–10	4–4	Levi's Stadium	Recap
10	November 9	**Seattle Seahawks**	**L** 16–22	4–5	University of Phoenix Stadium	Recap
11	November 19	at Houston Texans	**L** 21–31	4–6	NRG Stadium	Recap
12	November 26	Jacksonville Jaguars	**W** 27–24	5–6	University of Phoenix Stadium	Recap
13	December 3	**Los Angeles Rams**	**L** 16–32	5–7	University of Phoenix Stadium	Recap
14	December 10	Tennessee Titans	**W** 12–7	6–7	University of Phoenix Stadium	Recap
15	December 17	at Washington Redskins	**L** 15–20	6–8	FedExField	Recap
16	December 24	New York Giants	**W** 23–0	7–8	University of Phoenix Stadium	Recap
17	December 31	at **Seattle Seahawks**	**W** 26–24	8–8	CenturyLink Field	Recap

Note: Intra-division opponents are in bold text.

=== Game summaries ===
==== Week 1: at Detroit Lions ====
Week One: Arizona Cardinals at Detroit Lions – Game summary

Quarter	1	2	3	4	Total
Cardinals	10	0	7	6	**23**
**Lions**	0	9	6	20	**35**

at Ford Field, Detroit, Michigan

- Date: September 10
- Game time: 1:00 p.m. EDT/10:00 a.m. MST
- Game weather: Played indoors (dome stadium)
- Referee: Walt Anderson
- TV announcers (Fox): Chris Myers, Daryl Johnston, and Laura Okmin
- Recap, Gamebook

Game information

**First quarter**

- ARI – Justin Bethel 82-yard interception return (Phil Dawson kick). Cardinals 7–0. **Drive: 2 plays, 5 yards, 0:46.**
- ARI – Phil Dawson 24-yard field goal. Cardinals 10–0. **Drive: 7 plays, 7 yards, 3:32.**

**Second quarter**

- DET – Marvin Jones Jr. 6-yard pass from Matthew Stafford. Cardinals 10–6. **Drive: 11 plays, 42 yards, 6:16.**
- DET – Matt Prater 58-yard field goal. Cardinals 10–9. **Drive: 8 plays, 38 yards, 0:39.**

**Third quarter**

- ARI – Kerwynn Williams 3-yard rush. (Phil Dawson kick). Cardinals 17–9. **Drive: 12 plays, 94 yards, 5:49.**
- DET – Theo Riddick 7-yard pass from Matthew Stafford. Cardinals 17–15. **Drive: 2 plays, 10 yards, 0:45.**

**Fourth quarter**

- DET – Kenny Golladay 10-yard pass from Matthew Stafford. Lions 21–17. **Drive: 10 plays, 67 yards, 4:49.**
- DET – Kenny Golladay 45-yard pass from Matthew Stafford. (Matt Prater kick). Lions 28–17. **Drive: 5 plays, 72 yards, 2:55.**
- DET – Miles Killebrew 35-yard interception return (Matt Prater kick). Lions 35–17. **Drive: 1 play, 0 yards, 0:10.**
- ARI – J. J. Nelson 1-yard pass from Carson Palmer. Lions 35–23. **Drive: 10 plays, 75 yards, 2:30.**

**Top passers**

- ARI – Carson Palmer – 27/48, 269 yards, TD, 3 INT
- DET – Matthew Stafford – 29/41, 292 yards, 4 TD, INT

**Top rushers**

- ARI – David Johnson – 11 rushes, 23 yards
- DET – Ameer Abdullah – 15 rushes, 30 yards

**Top receivers**

- ARI – Larry Fitzgerald – 6 receptions, 74 yards
- DET – Golden Tate – 10 receptions, 107 yards

The Cardinals would lose star running back David Johnson to a wrist injury during the game. Afterwards, it was revealed that his dislocated his wrist, an injury that sent him to injured reserve on September 12 and would eventually keep him out for the rest of the season.

==== Week 2: at Indianapolis Colts ====
Week Two: Arizona Cardinals at Indianapolis Colts – Game summary

Quarter	1	2	3	4	OT	Total
**Cardinals**	0	3	0	10	3	**16**
Colts	10	0	0	3	0	**13**

at Lucas Oil Stadium, Indianapolis, Indiana

- Date: September 17
- Game time: 1:00 p.m. EDT/10:00 a.m. MST
- Game weather: Played indoors (retractable roof closed)
- Game attendance: 63,137
- Referee: Carl Cheffers
- TV announcers (Fox): Chris Myers, Daryl Johnston, and Laura Okmin
- Recap, Gamebook

Game information

**First quarter**

- IND – Frank Gore 5-yard run (Adam Vinatieri kick), 7:38. Colts 7–0. **Drive: 14 plays, 53 yards, 5:45.**
- IND – Adam Vinatieri 46-yard field goal, 1:27. Colts 10–0. **Drive: 8 plays, 32 yards, 4:21.**

**Second quarter**

- ARI – Phil Dawson 27-yard field goal, 5:56. Colts 10–3. **Drive: 15 plays, 54 yards, 5:49.**

**Third quarter**

- No scoring plays.

**Fourth quarter**

- IND – Adam Vinatieri 29-yard field goal, 11:42, Colts 13–3. **Drive: 16 plays, 76 yards, 9:18.**
- ARI – J. J. Nelson 45-yard pass from Carson Palmer (Phil Dawson kick), 7:38. Colts 13–10. **Drive: 7 plays, 85 yards, 4:04.**
- ARI – Phil Dawson 40-yard field goal, 3:25. Tied 13–13. **Drive: 6 plays, 40 yards, 2:09.**

**Overtime**

- ARI – Phil Dawson 30-yard field goal, 8:02. Cardinals 16–13. **Drive: 4 plays, 9 yards, 1:45.**

**Top passers**

- ARI – Carson Palmer – 19/36, 332 yards, TD, INT
- IND – Jacoby Brissett – 20/37, 216 yards, INT

**Top rushers**

- ARI – Chris Johnson – 11 rushes, 44 yards
- IND – Frank Gore – 14 rushes, 46 yards, TD

**Top receivers**

- ARI – J. J. Nelson – 5 receptions, 120 yards, TD
- IND – Jack Doyle – 8 receptions, 79 yards

For the first time in five years, head coach Bruce Arians made his return to Indianapolis, where he served as quarterback coach from 1998-2000, as offensive coordinator in 2012, and that same year, as interim head coach of the Colts.

==== Week 3: vs. Dallas Cowboys ====
Week Three: Dallas Cowboys at Arizona Cardinals – Game summary

Quarter	1	2	3	4	Total
**Cowboys**	0	7	7	14	**28**
Cardinals	7	0	7	3	**17**

at University of Phoenix Stadium, Glendale, Arizona

- Date: September 25
- Game time: 5:30 p.m. MST
- Game weather: Played indoors (retractable roof closed)
- Game attendance: 65,102
- Referee: Craig Wrolstad
- TV announcers (ESPN): Sean McDonough, Jon Gruden, and Lisa Salters
- Recap, Gamebook

Game information

**First quarter**

- ARI – Jaron Brown 25-yard pass from Carson Palmer (Phil Dawson kick), 10:06. Cardinals 7–0. **Drive: 8 plays, 82 yards, 5:01.**

**Second quarter**

- DAL – Dak Prescott 10-yard run (Dan Bailey kick), 1:16. Tied 7–7. **Drive: 5 plays, 84 yards, 2:41.**

**Third quarter**

- DAL – Dez Bryant 15-yard pass from Dak Prescott (Dan Bailey kick), 8:42. Cowboys 14–7. **Drive: 4 plays, 46 yards, 1:58.**
- ARI – Larry Fitzgerald 15-yard pass from Carson Palmer (Phil Dawson kick), 3:21. Tied 14–14. **Drive: 3 plays, 54 yards, 1:32.**

**Fourth quarter**

- DAL – Brice Butler 37-yard pass from Dak Prescott (Dan Bailey kick), 12:03. Cowboys 21–14. **Drive: 5 plays, 50 yards, 2:53.**
- ARI – Phil Dawson 37-yard field goal, 6:40. Cowboys 21–17. **Drive: 16 plays, 56 yards, 5:17.**
- DAL – Ezekiel Elliott 8-yard run (Dan Bailey kick), 5:03. Cowboys 28–17. **Drive: 4 plays, 75 yards, 1:38.**

**Top passers**

- DAL – Dak Prescott – 13/18, 183 yards, 2 TD
- ARI – Carson Palmer – 29/48, 325 yards, 2 TD

**Top rushers**

- DAL – Ezekiel Elliott – 22 rushes, 80 yards, TD
- ARI – Andre Ellington – 5 rushes, 22 yards

**Top receivers**

- DAL – Brice Butler – 2 receptions, 90 yards, TD
- ARI – Larry Fitzgerald – 13 receptions, 149 yards, TD

==== Week 4: vs. San Francisco 49ers ====
Week Four: San Francisco 49ers at Arizona Cardinals – Game summary

Quarter	1	2	3	4	OT	Total
49ers	3	3	6	0	3	**15**
**Cardinals**	0	6	3	3	6	**18**

at University of Phoenix Stadium, Glendale, Arizona

- Date: October 1
- Game time: 1:05 p.m. MST
- Game weather: Played indoors (retractable roof closed)
- Game attendance: 64,121
- Referee: Tony Corrente
- TV announcers (Fox): Sam Rosen, David Diehl, and Jennifer Hale
- Recap, Gamebook

Game information

**First quarter**

- SF – Robbie Gould 49-yard field goal, 2:05. 49ers 3–0. **Drive: 10 plays, 45 yards, 3:45.**

**Second quarter**

- ARI – Phil Dawson 29-yard field goal, 13:07. Tied 3–3. **Drive: 9 plays, 63 yards, 3:58.**
- SF – Robbie Gould 39-yard field goal, 7:16. 49ers 6–3. **Drive: 12 plays, 64 yards, 5:51.**
- ARI – Phil Dawson 43-yard field goal, 1:24. Tied 6–6. **Drive: 4 plays, 5 yards, 0:30.**

**Third quarter**

- SF – Robbie Gould 47-yard field goal, 10:34. 49ers 9–6. **Drive: 9 plays, 46 yards, 4:26.**
- ARI – Phil Dawson 50-yard field goal, 6:50. Tied 9–9. **Drive: 7 plays, 43 yards, 3:44.**
- SF – Robbie Gould 48-yard field goal, 2:22. 49ers 12–9. **Drive: 11 plays, 45 yards, 4:28.**

**Fourth quarter**

- ARI – Phil Dawson 32-yard field goal, 7:41. Tied 12–12. **Drive: 11 plays, 50 yards, 6:08.**

**Overtime**

- SF – Robbie Gould 23-yard field goal, 2:24. 49ers 15–12. **Drive: 17 plays, 73 yards, 7:36.**
- ARI – Larry Fitzgerald 19-yard pass from Carson Palmer, 0:32. Cardinals 18–15. **Drive: 7 plays, 75 yards, 1:52.**

**Top passers**

- SF – Brian Hoyer – 24/49, 234 yards, INT
- ARI – Carson Palmer – 33/51, 357 yards, TD, INT

**Top rushers**

- SF – Carlos Hyde – 16 rushes, 68 yards
- ARI – Chris Johnson – 13 rushes, 32 yards

**Top receivers**

- SF – Trent Taylor – 5 receptions, 47 yards
- ARI – Andre Ellington – 9 receptions, 86 yards

==== Week 5: at Philadelphia Eagles ====
Week Five: Arizona Cardinals at Philadelphia Eagles – Game summary

Quarter	1	2	3	4	Total
Cardinals	0	7	0	0	**7**
**Eagles**	21	0	10	3	**34**

at Lincoln Financial Field, Philadelphia, Pennsylvania

- Date: October 8
- Game time: 1:00 p.m. EDT/10:00 a.m. MST
- Game weather: Showers, 77 °F (25 °C)
- Game attendance: 69,596
- Referee: John Hussey
- TV announcers (Fox): Chris Myers, Daryl Johnston, and Laura Okmin
- Recap, Gamebook

Game information

**First quarter**

- PHI – Trey Burton 15-yard pass from Carson Wentz (Jake Elliott kick), 8:19. Eagles 7–0. **Drive: 10 plays, 49 yards, 5:26.**
- PHI – Zach Ertz 11-yard pass from Carson Wentz (Jake Elliott kick), 3:52. Eagles 14–0. **Drive: 3 plays, 15 yards, 1:30.**
- PHI – Torrey Smith 59-yard pass from Carson Wentz (Jake Elliott kick), 0:43. Eagles 21–0. **Drive: 3 plays, 64 yards, 1:33.**

**Second quarter**

- ARI – John Brown 13-yard pass from Carson Palmer (Phil Dawson kick), 11:42. Eagles 21–7. **Drive: 10 plays, 60 yards, 4:01.**

**Third quarter**

- PHI – Jake Elliott 36-yard field goal, 9:18. Eagles 24–7. **Drive: 11 plays, 57 yards, 5:42.**
- PHI – Nelson Agholor 72-yard pass from Carson Wentz (Jake Elliott kick), 6:16. Eagles 31–7. **Drive: 3 plays, 73 yards, 1:01.**

**Fourth quarter**

- PHI – Jake Elliott 28-yard field goal, 2:00. Eagles 34–7. **Drive: 13 plays, 47 yards, 9:14.**

**Top passers**

- ARI – Carson Palmer – 28/44, 291 yards, TD
- PHI – Carson Wentz – 21/30, 304 yards, 4 TD, INT

**Top rushers**

- ARI – Chris Johnson – 9 rushes, 21 yards
- PHI – LeGarrette Blount – 14 rushes, 74 yards

**Top receivers**

- ARI – J. J. Nelson – 4 receptions, 80 yards
- PHI – Nelson Agholor – 4 receptions, 93 yards, TD

==== Week 6: vs. Tampa Bay Buccaneers ====
Week Six: Tampa Bay Buccaneers at Arizona Cardinals – Game summary

Quarter	1	2	3	4	Total
Buccaneers	0	0	6	27	**33**
**Cardinals**	14	10	7	7	**38**

at University of Phoenix Stadium, Glendale, Arizona

- Date: October 15
- Game time: 1:05 p.m. MST
- Game weather: Played indoors (retractable roof closed)
- Game attendance: 63,999
- Referee: Gene Steratore
- TV announcers (Fox): Kenny Albert, Charles Davis, and Pam Oliver
- Recap, Gamebook

Game information

**First quarter**

- ARI – Adrian Peterson 27-yard run (Phil Dawson kick), 11:52. Cardinals 7–0. **Drive: 6 plays, 75 yards, 3:08.**
- ARI – Troy Niklas 14-yard pass from Carson Palmer (Phil Dawson kick), 5:24. Cardinals 14–0. **Drive: 7 plays, 86 yards, 3:38.**

**Second quarter**

- ARI – Larry Fitzgerald 11-yard pass from Carson Palmer (Phil Dawson kick), 12:04. Cardinals 21–0. **Drive: 7 plays, 95 yards, 4:04.**
- ARI – Phil Dawson 28-yard field goal, 5:31. Cardinals 24–0. **Drive: 10 plays, 60 yards, 6:02.**

**Third quarter**

- ARI – John Brown 17-yard pass from Carson Palmer (Phil Dawson kick), 11:58. Cardinals 31–0. **Drive: 4 plays, 33 yards, 2:11.**
- TB – DeSean Jackson 4-yard pass from Ryan Fitzpatrick (run failed), 8:27. Cardinals 31–6. **Drive: 8 plays, 75 yards, 3:31.**

**Fourth quarter**

- TB – Cameron Brate 10-yard pass from Ryan Fitzpatrick (pass failed), 13:32. Cardinals 31–12. **Drive: 6 plays, 63 yards, 2:50.**
- TB – Lavonte David 21-yard fumble return (Doug Martin run), 12:56. Cardinals 31–19.
- ARI – Adrian Peterson 1-yard run (Phil Dawson kick), 7:17. Cardinals 38–19. **Drive: 1 plays, 1 yards, 0:05.**
- TB – Doug Martin 1-yard run (pass failed), 3:02. Cardinals 38–25. **Drive: 11 plays, 70 yards, 4:15.**
- TB – Mike Evans 37-yard pass from Ryan Fitzpatrick (Patrick Murray kick), 2:02. Cardinals 38–33. **Drive: 3 plays, 65 yards, 0:32.**

**Top passers**

- TB – Ryan Fitzpatrick – 22/32, 290 yards, 3 TD, 2 INT
- ARI – Carson Palmer – 18/22, 283 yards, 3 TD, INT

**Top rushers**

- TB – Doug Martin – 14 rushes, 53 yards, TD
- ARI – Adrian Peterson – 26 rushes, 134 yards, 2 TD

**Top receivers**

- TB – Cameron Brate – 6 receptions, 76 yards, TD
- ARI – Larry Fitzgerald – 10 receptions, 138 yards, TD

This was the debut of recently acquired veteran running back Adrian Peterson. He'd have a hot day that contributed to a Cardinal victory, rushing 26 times for 134 yards and 2 touchdowns. The performance would earn him NFC Offensive Player of the Week.

==== Week 7: at Los Angeles Rams ====
NFL London Games

Week 7: Arizona Cardinals at Los Angeles Rams – Game summary

Quarter	1	2	3	4	Total
Cardinals	0	0	0	0	**0**
**Rams**	3	20	3	7	**33**

at Twickenham Stadium, London, England

- Date: October 22
- Game time: 6:00 p.m. BST/10:00 a.m. MST
- Game weather: Rain, 54 °F (12 °C)
- Game attendance: 73,736
- Referee: Brad Allen
- TV announcers (Fox): Sam Rosen, Ronde Barber, and Kristina Pink
- Recap, Gamebook

Game information

**First quarter**

- LAR – Greg Zuerlein 23-yard field goal, 4:14. Rams 3–0. **Drive: 14 plays, 73 yards, 5:50.**

**Second quarter**

- LAR – Greg Zuerlein 33-yard field goal, 11:13. Rams 6–0. **Drive: 8 plays, 51 yards, 3:38.**
- LAR – Todd Gurley 18-yard run (Greg Zuerlein kick), 5:25. Rams 13–0. **Drive: 1 plays, 18 yards, 0:10.**
- LAR – Jared Goff 9-yard run (Greg Zuerlein kick), 0:41. Rams 20–0. **Drive: 8 plays, 88 yards, 1:23.**
- LAR – Greg Zuerlein 53-yard field goal, 0:00. Rams 23–0. **Drive: 4 plays, 17 yards, 0:33.**

**Third quarter**

- LAR – Greg Zuerlein 34-yard field goal, 10:53. Rams 26–0. **Drive: 10 plays, 63 yards, 4:07.**

**Fourth quarter**

- LAR – Cooper Kupp 18-yard pass from Jared Goff (Greg Zuerlein kick), 3:46. Rams 33–0. **Drive: 16 plays, 80 yards, 10:19.**

**Top passers**

- ARI – Carson Palmer – 10/18, 122 yards, INT
- LAR – Jared Goff – 22/37, 235 yards, TD, INT

**Top rushers**

- ARI – Adrian Peterson – 11 rushes, 21 yards
- LAR – Todd Gurley – 22 rushes, 106 yards, TD

**Top receivers**

- ARI – Larry Fitzgerald – 3 receptions, 29 yards
- LAR – Robert Woods – 5 receptions, 59 yards

The Cardinals lost Carson Palmer to an arm injury during the game. Shortly after, it was revealed that he broke his arm and would be out for the remainder of the season. It was also his last game he'd ever play in the NFL.

==== Week 9: at San Francisco 49ers ====
Week Nine: Arizona Cardinals at San Francisco 49ers – Game summary

Quarter	1	2	3	4	Total
**Cardinals**	7	7	0	6	**20**
49ers	0	3	7	0	**10**

at Levi's Stadium, Santa Clara, California

- Date: November 5
- Game time: 2:05 p.m. MST/1:05 p.m. PST
- Game weather: Sunny, 61 °F (16 °C)
- Game attendance: 70,133
- Referee: Craig Wrolstad
- TV announcers (Fox): Chris Myers, Daryl Johnston, and Laura Okmin
- Recap, Gamebook

Game information

**First quarter**

- ARI – Jaron Brown 3-yard pass from Drew Stanton (Phil Dawson kick), 10:15. Cardinals 7–0. **Drive: 3 plays, 6 yards, 1:23.**

**Second quarter**

- SF – Robbie Gould 42-yard field goal, 14:55. Cardinals 7–3. **Drive: 6 plays, 58 yards, 1:43.**
- ARI – Jermaine Gresham 11-yard pass from Drew Stanton (Phil Dawson kick), 11:04. Cardinals 14–3. **Drive: 7 plays, 75 yards, 3:51.**

**Third quarter**

- SF – C. J. Beathard 1-yard run (Robbie Gould kick), 9:43. Cardinals 14–10. **Drive: 13 plays, 75 yards, 5:17.**

**Fourth quarter**

- ARI – Phil Dawson 25-yard field goal, 13:31. Cardinals 17–10. **Drive: 12 plays, 65 yards, 6:24.**
- ARI – Phil Dawson 32-yard field goal, 5:33. Cardinals 20–10. **Drive: 11 plays, 39 yards, 7:02.**

**Top passers**

- ARI – Drew Stanton – 15/30, 201 yards, 2 TD, INT
- SF – C. J. Beathard – 24/51, 294 yards, INT

**Top rushers**

- ARI – Adrian Peterson – 37 rushes, 159 yards
- SF – Carlos Hyde – 12 rushes, 41 yards

**Top receivers**

- ARI – Larry Fitzgerald – 5 receptions, 70 yards
- SF – Carlos Hyde – 9 receptions, 84 yards

==== Week 10: vs. Seattle Seahawks ====
Week Ten: Seattle Seahawks at Arizona Cardinals – Game summary

Quarter	1	2	3	4	Total
**Seahawks**	7	8	0	7	**22**
Cardinals	0	7	3	6	**16**

at University of Phoenix Stadium, Glendale, Arizona

- Date: November 9
- Game time: 6:25 p.m. MST
- Game weather: Clear (retractable roof open), 79 °F (26 °C)
- Game attendance: 64,639
- Referee: Walt Anderson
- TV announcers (NBC/NFLN/Amazon Video): Mike Tirico, Cris Collinsworth, and Heather Cox
- Recap, Gamebook

Game information

**First quarter**

- SEA – Jimmy Graham 6-yard pass from Russell Wilson (Blair Walsh kick), 5:07. Seahawks 7–0. **Drive: 9 plays, 51 yards, 4:00.**

**Second quarter**

- ARI – Jermaine Gresham 14-yard pass from Drew Stanton (Phil Dawson kick), 14:53. Tied 7–7. **Drive: 9 plays, 75 yards, 5:14.**
- SEA – Adrian Peterson tackled by Kam Chancellor in the end zone for a safety, 10:53. Seahawks 9–7.
- SEA – Blair Walsh 33-yard field goal, 10:19. Seahawks 12–7. **Drive: 11 plays, 76 yards, 5:45.**
- SEA – Blair Walsh 43-yard field goal, 10:19. Seahawks 15–7. **Drive: 5 plays, 37 yards, 0:44.**

**Third quarter**

- ARI – Phil Dawson 43-yard field goal, 10:19. Seahawks 15–10. **Drive: 11 plays, 51 yards, 6:28.**

**Fourth quarter**

- SEA – Jimmy Graham 2-yard pass from Russell Wilson (Blair Walsh kick), 12:49. Seahawks 22–10. **Drive: 7 plays, 80 yards, 3:54.**
- ARI – Andre Ellington 1-yard run (kick blocked), 0:20. Seahawks 22–16. **Drive: 11 plays, 61 yards, 2:08.**

**Top passers**

- SEA – Russell Wilson – 22/32, 238 yards, 2 TD
- ARI – Drew Stanton – 24/47, 273 yards, TD

**Top rushers**

- SEA – Thomas Rawls – 10 rushes, 27 yards
- ARI – Adrian Peterson – 21 rushes, 29 yards

**Top receivers**

- SEA – Doug Baldwin – 5 receptions, 95 yards
- ARI – Larry Fitzgerald – 10 receptions, 113 yards

==== Week 11: at Houston Texans ====
Week Eleven: Arizona Cardinals at Houston Texans – Game summary

Quarter	1	2	3	4	Total
Cardinals	0	14	7	0	**21**
**Texans**	0	10	7	14	**31**

at NRG Stadium, Houston, Texas

- Date: November 19
- Game time: 12:00 p.m. CST/11:00 a.m. MST
- Game weather: Played indoors (retractable roof closed)
- Game attendance: 71,680
- Referee: Ed Hochuli
- TV announcers (Fox): Kenny Albert, Ronde Barber, and Kristina Pink
- Recap, Gamebook

Game information

**First quarter**

- No scoring plays.

**Second quarter**

- HOU – Lamar Miller 7-yard pass from Tom Savage (Kaʻimi Fairbairn kick), 14:12. Texans 7–0. **Drive: 12 plays, 89 yards, 6:58.**
- ARI – Larry Fitzgerald 20-yard pass from Blaine Gabbert (Phil Dawson kick), 7:20. Tied 7–7. **Drive: 2 plays, 17 yards, 0:47.**
- ARI – Ricky Seals-Jones 11-yard pass from Blaine Gabbert (Phil Dawson kick), 1:53. Cardinals 14–7. **Drive: 2 plays, 15 yards, 0:29.**
- HOU – Kaʻimi Fairbairn 34-yard field goal, 0:09. Cardinals 14–10. **Drive: 8 plays, 59 yards, 1:48.**

**Third quarter**

- HOU – DeAndre Hopkins 28-yard pass from Tom Savage (Kaʻimi Fairbairn kick), 11:02. Texans 17–14. **Drive: 7 plays, 74 yards, 3:58.**
- ARI – Ricky Seals-Jones 28-yard pass from Blaine Gabbert (Phil Dawson kick), 4:41. Cardinals 21–17. **Drive: 7 plays, 51 yards, 3:45.**

**Fourth quarter**

- HOU – D'Onta Foreman 3-yard run (Kaʻimi Fairbairn kick), 13:13. Texans 24–21. **Drive: 11 plays, 75 yards, 6:28.**
- HOU – D'Onta Foreman 34-yard run (Kaʻimi Fairbairn kick), 6:26. Texans 31–21. **Drive: 1 play, 34 yards, 0:07.**

**Top passers**

- ARI – Blaine Gabbert – 21/33, 237 yards, 3 TD, 2 INT
- HOU – Tom Savage – 22/32, 230 yards, 2 TD, INT

**Top rushers**

- ARI – Adrian Peterson – 14 rushes, 26 yards
- HOU – D'Onta Foreman – 10 rushes, 65 yards, 2 TD

**Top receivers**

- ARI – Larry Fitzgerald – 9 receptions, 91 yards, TD
- HOU – DeAndre Hopkins – 4 receptions, 76 yards, TD

==== Week 12: vs. Jacksonville Jaguars ====
Week Twelve: Jacksonville Jaguars at Arizona Cardinals – Game summary

Quarter	1	2	3	4	Total
Jaguars	0	3	7	14	**24**
**Cardinals**	3	10	3	11	**27**

at University of Phoenix Stadium, Glendale, Arizona

- Date: November 26
- Game time: 2:25 p.m. MST
- Game weather: Played indoors (retractable roof closed)
- Game attendance: 63,891
- Referee: Clete Blakeman
- TV announcers (CBS): Spero Dedes and Adam Archuleta
- Recap, Gamebook

Game information

**First quarter**

- ARI – Phil Dawson 34-yard field goal, 8:26. Cardinals 3–0. **Drive: 9 plays, 51 yards, 4:51.**

**Second quarter**

- ARI – Phil Dawson 42-yard field goal, 9:05. Cardinals 6–0. **Drive: 5 plays, 36 yards, 2:08.**
- ARI – Ricky Seals-Jones 29-yard pass from Blaine Gabbert (Phil Dawson kick), 4:51. Cardinals 13–0. **Drive: 4 plays, 41 yards, 2:07.**
- JAX – Josh Lambo 43-yard field goal, 0:20. Cardinals 13–3. **Drive: 8 plays, 31 yards, 1:45.**

**Third quarter**

- ARI – Phil Dawson 48-yard field goal, 11:34. Cardinals 16–3. **Drive: 8 plays, 45 yards, 3:31.**
- JAX – Blake Bortles 1-yard run (Josh Lambo kick), 7:39. Cardinals 16–10. **Drive: 7 plays, 75 yards, 3:56.**

**Fourth quarter**

- JAX – Calais Campbell 10-yard fumble return (Josh Lambo kick), 12:19 Jaguars 17–16.
- ARI – Jaron Brown 52-yard pass from Blaine Gabbert (Blaine Gabbert to Larry Fitzgerald, pass succeeded), 9:17. Cardinals 24–17. **Drive: 6 plays, 75 yards, 3:03.**
- JAX – Blake Bortles 17-yard run (Josh Lambo kick), 7:33. Tied 24–24. **Drive: 4 plays, 38 yards, 1:41.**
- ARI – Phil Dawson 57-yard field goal, 0:06. Cardinals 27–24. **Drive: 3 plays, 22 yards, 0:15.**

**Top passers**

- JAX – Blake Bortles – 19/33, 160 yards, INT
- ARI – Blaine Gabbert – 22/38, 241 yards, 2 TD, INT

**Top rushers**

- JAX – Blake Bortles – 6 rushes, 62 yards, 2 TD
- ARI – Adrian Peterson – 20 rushes, 79 yards

**Top receivers**

- JAX – Dede Westbrook – 6 receptions, 41 yards
- ARI – Ricky Seals-Jones – 4 receptions, 72 yards

==== Week 13: vs. Los Angeles Rams ====
Week Thirteen: Los Angeles Rams at Arizona Cardinals – Game summary

Quarter	1	2	3	4	Total
**Rams**	16	3	7	6	**32**
Cardinals	0	13	0	3	**16**

at University of Phoenix Stadium, Glendale, Arizona

- Date: December 3
- Game time: 2:25 p.m. MST
- Game weather: Played indoors (retractable roof closed)
- Game attendance: 63,986
- Referee: Ronald Torbert
- TV announcers (Fox): Chris Myers, Daryl Johnston, and Laura Okmin
- Recap, Gamebook

Game information

**First quarter**

- LAR – Greg Zuerlein 56-yard field goal, 11:41. Rams 3–0. **Drive: 6 plays, 31 yards, 3:19.**
- LAR – Gerald Everett 1-yard pass from Jared Goff (kick failed), 7:51. Rams 9–0. **Drive: 7 plays, 23 yards, 3:30.**
- LAR – Alec Ogletree 41-yard interception return (Greg Zuerlein kick), 2:45. Rams 16–0.

**Second quarter**

- ARI – Elijhaa Penny 1-yard run (Phil Dawson kick), 7:38. Rams 16–7. **Drive: 9 plays, 67 yards, 6:07.**
- ARI – Larry Fitzgerald 15-yard pass from Blaine Gabbert (kick blocked), 3:25. Rams 16–13. **Drive: 6 plays, 70 yards, 2:28.**
- LAR – Greg Zuerlein 20-yard field goal, 0:00. Rams 19–13. **Drive: 9 plays, 78 yards, 3:25.**

**Third quarter**

- LAR – Sammy Watkins 11-yard pass from Jared Goff (Greg Zuerlein kick), 5:07. Rams 26–13. **Drive: 6 plays, 30 yards, 3:00.**

**Fourth quarter**

- ARI – Phil Dawson 54-yard field goal, 14:55. Rams 26–16. **Drive: 10 plays, 46 yards, 5:12.**
- LAR – Greg Zuerlein 24-yard field goal, 6:18. Rams 29–16. **Drive: 8 plays, 52 yards, 4:34.**
- LAR – Greg Zuerlein 41-yard field goal, 1:55. Rams 32–16. **Drive: 7 plays, 31 yards, 2:34.**

**Top passers**

- LAR – Jared Goff – 21/31, 220 yards, 2 TD, INT
- ARI – Blaine Gabbert – 18/32, 221 yards, TD, 2 INT

**Top rushers**

- LAR – Todd Gurley – 19 rushes, 74 yards
- ARI – Kerwynn Williams – 16 rushes, 97 yards

**Top receivers**

- LAR – Todd Gurley – 6 receptions, 84 yards
- ARI – Larry Fitzgerald – 10 receptions, 98 yards, 1 TD

==== Week 14: vs. Tennessee Titans ====
Week Fourteen: Tennessee Titans at Arizona Cardinals – Game summary

Quarter	1	2	3	4	Total
Titans	0	7	0	0	**7**
**Cardinals**	0	0	6	6	**12**

at University of Phoenix Stadium, Glendale, Arizona

- Date: December 10
- Game time: 2:05 p.m. MST
- Game weather: Partly cloudy (retractable roof open), 79 °F (26 °C)
- Game attendance: 64,153
- Referee: Jerome Boger
- TV announcers (CBS): Andrew Catalon, James Lofton, and Jay Feely
- Recap, Gamebook

Game information

**First quarter**

- No scoring plays.

**Second quarter**

- TEN – Derrick Henry 6-yard run (Ryan Succop kick), 7:16. Titans 7–0. **Drive: 9 plays, 50 yards, 5:02.**

**Third quarter**

- ARI – Phil Dawson 47-yard field goal, 9:36. Titans 7–3. **Drive: 9 plays, 48 yards, 5:24.**
- ARI – Phil Dawson 23-yard field goal, 4:44. Titans 7–6. **Drive: 5 plays, 30 yards, 2:41.**

**Fourth quarter**

- ARI – Phil Dawson 32-yard field goal, 5:59. Cardinals 9–7. **Drive: 8 plays, 71 yards, 4:00.**
- ARI – Phil Dawson 35-yard field goal, 3:45. Cardinals 12–7. **Drive: 4 plays, 10 yards, 2:03.**

**Top passers**

- TEN – Marcus Mariota – 16/31, 159 yards, 2 INT
- ARI – Blaine Gabbert – 17/29, 178 yards

**Top rushers**

- TEN – DeMarco Murray – 11 rushes, 34 yards
- ARI – Kerwynn Williams – 20 rushes, 73 yards

**Top receivers**

- TEN – Delanie Walker – 5 receptions, 42 yards
- ARI – Larry Fitzgerald – 5 receptions, 44 yards

==== Week 15: at Washington Redskins ====
Week Fifteen: Arizona Cardinals at Washington Redskins – Game summary

Quarter	1	2	3	4	Total
Cardinals	3	6	3	3	**15**
**Redskins**	7	7	3	3	**20**

at FedExField, Landover, Maryland

- Date: December 17
- Game time: 1:00 p.m. EST/11:00 a.m. MST
- Game weather: Cloudy, 50 °F (10 °C)
- Game attendance: 71,026
- Referee: Pete Morelli
- TV announcers (Fox): Kenny Albert, Ronde Barber, and Kristina Pink
- Recap, Gamebook

Game information

**First quarter**

- WAS – Jamison Crowder 5-yard pass from Kirk Cousins (Dustin Hopkins kick), 13:30. Redskins 7–0. **Drive: 2 plays, 6 yards, 0:43.**
- ARI – Phil Dawson 40-yard field goal, 3:47. Redskins 7–3. **Drive: 16 plays, 60 yards, 9:43.**

**Second quarter**

- WAS – Kapri Bibbs 36-yard pass from Kirk Cousins (Dustin Hopkins kick), 13:27. Redskins 14–3. **Drive: 5 plays, 63 yards, 1:41.**
- ARI – Phil Dawson 35-yard field goal, 7:35. Redskins 14–6. **Drive: 11 plays, 57 yards, 5:52.**
- ARI – Phil Dawson 19-yard field goal, 0:00. Redskins 14–9. **Drive: 10 plays, 32 yards, 1:39.**

**Third quarter**

- ARI – Phil Dawson 34-yard field goal, 13:37. Redskins 14–12. **Drive: 4 plays, 6 yards, 1:23.**
- WAS – Dustin Hopkins 24-yard field goal, 4:23. Redskins 17–12. **Drive: 11 plays, 88 yards, 6:04.**

**Fourth quarter**

- ARI – Phil Dawson 32-yard field goal, 11:13. Redskins 17–15. **Drive: 9 plays, 47 yards, 3:37.**
- WAS – Dustin Hopkins 32-yard field goal, 4:30. Redskins 20–15. **Drive: 8 plays, 30 yards, 3:21.**

**Top passers**

- ARI – Blaine Gabbert – 16/41, 189 yards, INT
- WAS – Kirk Cousins – 18/26, 196 yards, 2 TD

**Top rushers**

- ARI – Kerwynn Williams – 17 rushes, 61 yards
- WAS – Samaje Perine – 14 rushes, 37 yards

**Top receivers**

- ARI – Larry Fitzgerald – 5 receptions, 60 yards
- WAS – Jamison Crowder – 5 receptions, 55 yards, TD

==== Week 16: vs. New York Giants ====
Week Sixteen: New York Giants at Arizona Cardinals – Game summary

Quarter	1	2	3	4	Total
Giants	0	0	0	0	**0**
**Cardinals**	3	7	6	7	**23**

at University of Phoenix Stadium, Glendale, Arizona

- Date: December 24
- Game time: 2:25 p.m. MST
- Game weather: Sunny and clear (retractable roof open), 71 °F (22 °C)
- Game attendance: 63,850
- Referee: John Parry
- TV announcers (Fox): Dick Stockton, Mark Schlereth, and Shannon Spake
- Recap, Gamebook

Game information

**First quarter**

- ARI – Phil Dawson 21-yard field goal, 5:29. Cardinals 3–0. **Drive: 9 plays, 46 yards, 5:16.**

**Second quarter**

- ARI – Larry Fitzgerald 13-yard pass from Drew Stanton (Phil Dawson kick), 1:01. Cardinals 10–0. **Drive: 9 plays, 79 yards, 2:04.**

**Third quarter**

- ARI – John Brown 15-yard pass from Drew Stanton (Phil Dawson kick), 9:25. Cardinals 17–0. **Drive: 11 plays, 75 yards, 5:32.**

**Fourth quarter**

- ARI – Robert Nkemdiche 21-yard fumble return (Phil Dawson kick failed), 14:50. Cardinals 23–0.

**Top passers**

- NYG – Eli Manning – 27/45, 263 yards, 2 INT
- ARI – Drew Stanton – 20/34, 209 yards, 2 TD, 2 INT

**Top rushers**

- NYG – Wayne Gallman – 10 rushes, 18 yards
- ARI – Kerwynn Williams – 16 rushes, 51 yards

**Top receivers**

- NYG – Rhett Ellison – 4 receptions, 60 yards
- ARI – Larry Fitzgerald – 9 receptions, 119 yards, 1 TD

==== Week 17: at Seattle Seahawks ====
Week Seventeen: Arizona Cardinals at Seattle Seahawks – Game summary

Quarter	1	2	3	4	Total
**Cardinals**	10	10	3	3	**26**
Seahawks	7	0	7	10	**24**

at CenturyLink Field, Seattle, Washington

- Date: December 31
- Game time: 2:25 p.m. MST/1:25 p.m. PST
- Game weather: Sunny, 40 °F (4 °C)
- Game attendance: 69,078
- Referee: Walt Coleman
- TV announcers (Fox): Chris Myers, Daryl Johnston, and Laura Okmin
- Recap, Gamebook

Game information

**First quarter**

- ARI – Jaron Brown 25-yard pass from Drew Stanton (Phil Dawson kick), 8:55. Cardinals 7–0. **Drive: 10 plays, 73 yards, 6:05.**
- SEA – Tyler Lockett 99-yard kickoff return (Blair Walsh kick), 8:43. Tied 7–7.
- ARI – Phil Dawson 49-yard field goal, 7:10. Cardinals 10–7. **Drive: 5 plays, 12 yards, 1:33.**

**Second quarter**

- ARI – Elijhaa Penny 4-yard run (Phil Dawson kick), 12:19. Cardinals 17–7. **Drive: 7 plays, 43 yards, 3:49.**
- ARI – Phil Dawson 46-yard field goal, 0:58. Cardinals 20–7. **Drive: 8 plays, 46 yards, 1:25.**

**Third quarter**

- SEA – Doug Baldwin 18-yard pass from Russell Wilson (Blair Walsh kick), 8:59. Cardinals 20–14. **Drive: 10 plays, 80 yards, 6:01.**
- ARI – Phil Dawson 53-yard field goal, 4:22. Cardinals 23–14. **Drive: 6 plays, 19 yards, 2:54.**

**Fourth quarter**

- SEA – Blair Walsh 49-yard field goal, 13:04. Cardinals 23–17. **Drive: 7 plays, 29 yards, 2:41.**
- SEA – Doug Baldwin 29-yard pass from Russell Wilson (Blair Walsh kick), 10:24. Seahawks 24–23. **Drive: 2 plays, 60 yards, 0:47.**
- ARI – Phil Dawson 42-yard field goal, 2:21. Cardinals 26–24. **Drive: 10 plays, 62 yards, 4:50.**

**Top passers**

- ARI – Drew Stanton – 15/34, 145 yards, TD, INT
- SEA – Russell Wilson – 18/29, 221 yards, 2 TD

**Top rushers**

- ARI – Kerwynn Williams – 23 rushes, 75 yards
- SEA – Mike Davis – 10 rushes, 48 yards

**Top receivers**

- ARI – Larry Fitzgerald – 8 receptions, 55 yards
- SEA – Doug Baldwin – 4 receptions, 90 yards, 2 TD

The Seahawks lost four out of five home games versus the Bruce Arians-led Cardinals; this one, combined with the Atlanta Falcons winning, eliminated Seattle for the first time since 2011. In what would be head coach Bruce Arians' final game as Cardinals head coach, Arians recorded his 50th win with the Cardinals and became the winningest head coach in Cardinals history, surpassing Ken Whisenhunt, who won 49 games during his tenure with the Cardinals (2007–2012).

=== Standings ===
==== Division ====
NFC West
	W	L	T	PCT	DIV	CONF	PF	PA	STK
^{(3)} Los Angeles Rams	11	5	0	.688	4–2	7–5	478	329	L1
Seattle Seahawks	9	7	0	.563	4–2	7–5	366	332	L1
Arizona Cardinals	8	8	0	.500	3–3	5–7	295	361	W2
San Francisco 49ers	6	10	0	.375	1–5	3–9	331	383	W5

==== Conference ====
NFC
#	Team	Division	W	L	T	PCT	DIV	CONF	SOS	SOV	STK
**Division leaders**
1 (Note: Philadelphia claimed the No. 1 seed over Minnesota based on winning percentage vs. common opponents. Philadelphia's cumulative record against Carolina, Chicago, the Los Angeles Rams and Washington was 5–0, compared to Minnesota's 4–1 cumulative record against the same four teams.)	Philadelphia Eagles	East	13	3	0	.813	5–1	10–2	.461	.433	L1
2	Minnesota Vikings	North	13	3	0	.813	5–1	10–2	.492	.447	W3
3 (Note: LA Rams claimed the No. 3 seed over New Orleans based on head-to-head victory.)	Los Angeles Rams	West	11	5	0	.688	4–2	7–5	.504	.460	L1
4 (Note: New Orleans clinched the NFC South division over Carolina based on head-to-head sweep.)	New Orleans Saints	South	11	5	0	.688	4–2	8–4	.535	.483	L1
**Wild Cards**
5	Carolina Panthers	South	11	5	0	.688	3–3	7–5	.539	.500	L1
6	Atlanta Falcons	South	10	6	0	.625	4–2	9–3	.543	.475	W1
**Did not qualify for the postseason**
7 (Note: Detroit finished ahead of Dallas and Seattle based on conference record, while Seattle finished ahead of Dallas based on head-to-head victory.)	Detroit Lions	North	9	7	0	.563	5–1	8–4	.496	.368	W1
8	Seattle Seahawks	West	9	7	0	.563	4–2	7–5	.492	.444	L1
9	Dallas Cowboys	East	9	7	0	.563	5–1	7–5	.496	.438	W1
10	Arizona Cardinals	West	8	8	0	.500	3–3	5–7	.488	.406	W2
11 (Note: Green Bay finished ahead of Washington based on record vs. common opponents. Green Bay's cumulative record against Dallas, Minnesota, New Orleans and Seattle was 2–3, compared to Washington's 1–4 cumulative record against the same four teams.)	Green Bay Packers	North	7	9	0	.438	2–4	5–7	.539	.357	L3
12	Washington Redskins	East	7	9	0	.438	1–5	5–7	.539	.429	L1
13	San Francisco 49ers	West	6	10	0	.375	1–5	3–9	.512	.438	W5
14 (Note: Tampa Bay finished ahead of Chicago based on head-to-head victory.)	Tampa Bay Buccaneers	South	5	11	0	.313	1–5	3–9	.555	.375	W1
15	Chicago Bears	North	5	11	0	.313	0–6	1–11	.559	.500	L1
16	New York Giants	East	3	13	0	.188	1–5	1–11	.531	.458	W1
**Tiebreakers** (Note: When breaking ties for three or more teams under the NFL's rules, they are first broken within divisions, then comparing only the highest-ranked remaining team from each division.)

== Statistics ==
=== Starters ===
Offense

Pos.	Name	GS
QB	Carson Palmer; Drew Stanton; Blaine Gabbert	7; 4; 5
RB	David Johnson; Kerwynn Williams; Adrian Peterson; Chris Johnson	1; 6; 6; 3
WR1	Larry Fitzgerald	16
WR2	John Brown; Jaron Brown	8; 8
TE	Jermaine Gresham; Troy Niklas	14; 2
TE	Troy Niklas; Ricky Seals-Jones; Ifeanyi Momah	13; 2; 1
LT	D.J. Humphries; John Wetzel; Will Holden	5; 8; 3
LG	Mike Iupati; Alex Boone; Will Holden; Earl Watford	1; 13; 1; 1
C	A.Q. Shipley	16
RG	Evan Boehm; Earl Watford	7; 9
RT	Jared Veldheer; John Wetzel	13; 3

Defense

Pos.	Name	GS
DE	Josh Mauro; Olsen Pierre	11; 5
NT	Corey Peters; Rodney Gunter	12; 4
DE	Frostee Rucker	16
OLB	Chandler Jones	16
LB	Deone Bucannon; Haason Reddick; Josh Bynes	12; 3; 1
LB	Karlos Dansby	16
OLB	Markus Golden; Haason Reddick	4; 12
CB	Patrick Peterson	16
SS	Tyvon Branch; Budda Baker	9; 7
FS	Tyrann Mathieu	16
CB	Justin Bethel; Tramon Williams	6; 10

Special Teams

Pos.	Name	GS
P	Andy Lee	16
K	Phil Dawson	16
LS	Aaron Brewer; Justin Drescher	8; 8

=== Individual leaders ===
Category	Player(s)	Value
Passing yards	Carson Palmer	1,978
Passing touchdowns	Carson Palmer	7
Rushing yards	Adrian Peterson	448
Rushing touchdowns	Adrian Peterson; Elijhaa Penny	2
Receptions	Larry Fitzgerald	109
Receiving yards	Larry Fitzgerald	1,156
Receiving touchdowns	Larry Fitzgerald	6
Kickoff return yards	Kerwynn Williams	326
Punt return yards	Kerwynn Williams	137
Tackles	Karlos Dansby	95
Sacks	Chandler Jones	17.0
Forced fumbles	Haason Reddick; Deone Bucannon; Budda Baker; Josh Bynes; Chandler Jones	2
Interceptions	Antoine Bethea	5
Kicking - field goals	Phil Dawson	32/40, 80.0%
Kicking - extra points	Phil Dawson	23/26, 88.5%

=== Team rankings ===
Category	Value	NFL rank (out of 32)
Passing attempts	598	
Passing completions	339	5th
Passing yards	3,640	15th
Passing touchdowns	21	20th
Interceptions thrown	18	28th
Rushing attempts	410	20th
Rushing yards	1,386	30th
Rushing touchdowns	6	28th
Rushing yards/attempt	3.4	31st
Total yards of offense	5,026	22nd
Points scored	295	25th
Points allowed	361	19th
Passing yards allowed	3,541	14th
Passing touchdowns allowed	24	18th
Rushing attempts against	407	10th
Rushing yards allowed	1,432	6th
Rushing touchdowns allowed	12	16th
Yards/rush attempt allowed	3.5	3rd
Interceptions made	15	12th
Fumbles recovered	6	23rd
Total yards allowed	4,973	6th

Statistics correct as of the end of the 2017 NFL season
