= Haason Reddick =

American football player (born 1994)

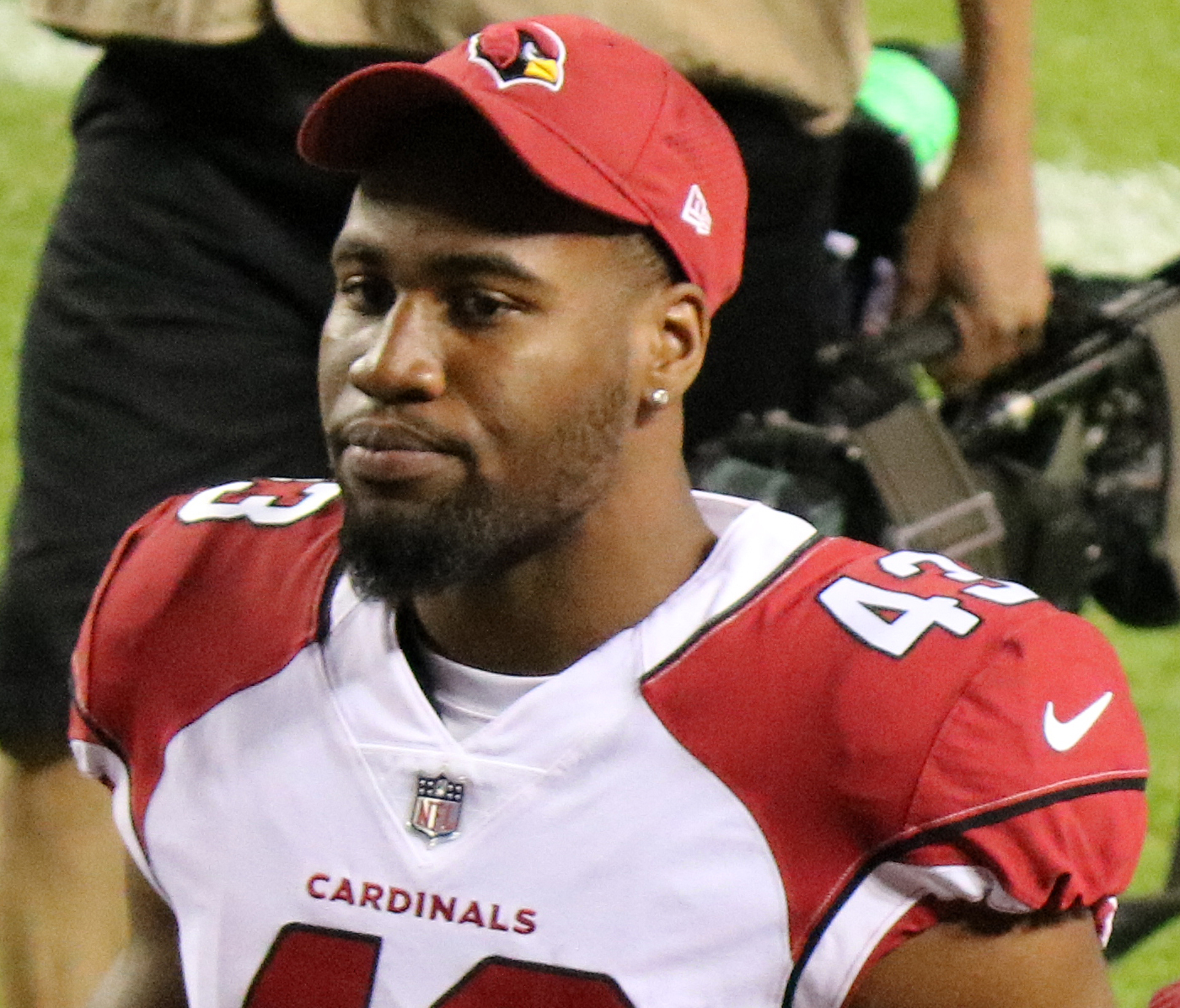
- Reddick with the Arizona Cardinals in 2017

Profile
- Position: Outside linebacker

Personal information
- Born: September 22, 1994 (age 32); Camden, New Jersey, U.S.
- Listed height: 6 ft 1 in (1.85 m)
- Listed weight: 240 lb (109 kg)

Career information
- High school: Haddon Heights (Haddon Heights, New Jersey)
- College: Temple (2012–2016)
- NFL draft: 2017: 1st round, 13th overall pick

Career history
- Arizona Cardinals (2017–2020); Carolina Panthers (2021); Philadelphia Eagles (2022–2023); New York Jets (2024); Tampa Bay Buccaneers (2025)

Awards and highlights
- Second-team All-Pro (2022); 2× Pro Bowl (2022, 2023); NFL forced fumbles co-leader (2022); First-team All-AAC (2016)

Career NFL statistics as of 2025
- Total tackles: 455
- Sacks: 61.5
- Forced fumbles: 18
- Fumble recoveries: 5
- Pass deflections: 21
- Stats at Pro Football Reference

Haason Samir Reddick (born September 22, 1994) is an American professional football outside linebacker. He played college football for the Temple Owls, and was selected by the Arizona Cardinals in the first round of the 2017 NFL draft. He also played for the Carolina Panthers, Philadelphia Eagles, New York Jets, and Tampa Bay Buccaneers.

== Early life ==
Reddick attended Haddon Heights High School in Haddon Heights, New Jersey. He played safety and running back for the Garnets high school football team. He played in only four games his senior season due to a fractured femur.

== College career ==
Reddick joined the Temple University football team as a walk-on in 2012. He was a running back and safety his freshman year. He redshirted for the 2012 season and saw his first game action in 2013. As a senior in 2016, he was named First-team All-American Athletic Conference after recording 65 tackles and 10.5 sacks as a defensive end.

== Professional career ==
On November 14, 2016, it was announced that Reddick had accepted his invitation to play in the 2017 Senior Bowl. He was moved to inside linebacker during the Senior Bowl and impressed team representatives and scouts after excelling in practice. On January 28, 2017, Reddick recorded a game-high nine combined tackles, tying Michigan's Ben Gedeon, as he played for Chicago Bears head coach John Fox's North team that lost 16–15 to the South. His Senior Bowl performance vastly improved his draft stock and made him one of the fastest risers through the draft process, going from an obscure potential top 100 prospect to a top 20 prospect. He received an invitation to NFL Scouting Combine as a defensive end and completed all the required drills. Reddick's 11'1" broad jump was the best among defensive lineman since 2003 and his 4.52 in the 40-yard dash was the best among the defensive lineman at the draft and second-best among linebackers. He also attended Temple's Pro Day and decided to only run the shuttle, three-cone, and do positional drills. Reddick was projected to be a first round pick by NFL draft experts and analysts. He was ranked the best linebacker prospect in the draft by ESPN, the second-best linebacker by Sports Illustrated, ranked the best outside linebacker by NFLDraftScout.com, and the second-best linebacker by NFL media analyst Mike Mayock.

External videos
- Haason Reddick's NFL Combine workout
- Haason Reddick's 40-yard dash

Pre-draft measurables
Height	Weight	Arm length	Hand span	40-yard dash	10-yard split	20-yard split	20-yard shuttle	Three-cone drill	Vertical jump	Broad jump	Bench press
6 ft 1 1/2 in (1.87 m)	237 lb (108 kg)	32 3/4 in (0.83 m)	10 1/8 in (0.26 m)	4.52 s	1.59 s	2.62 s	4.37 s	7.01 s	36.5 in (0.93 m)	11 ft 1 in (3.38 m)	24 reps
All values from 2017 NFL Combine

=== Arizona Cardinals ===
The Arizona Cardinals selected Reddick in the first round (13th overall) of the 2017 NFL draft. He was the first linebacker selected in 2017 and one of three Temple players, along with Dion Dawkins and Nate Hairston. Reddick also surpassed Paul Palmer to become Temple's second highest draft pick in history, being behind only John Rienstra, who was selected by the Pittsburgh Steelers with the ninth overall pick in the 1986 NFL draft.

External videos
- Cardinals select Reddick 13th overall
- Reddick's NFL Draft Interview

On June 8, 2017, the Arizona Cardinals signed Haason Reddick to a fully guaranteed $13.4 million contract (duration four-year), with a confirmed $7.94 Million signing bonus.

Throughout training camp, Reddick competed for the job as the starting inside linebacker against Deone Bucannon, Karlos Dansby and Zaviar Gooden. He played the hybrid inside linebacker position after Bucannon suffered an ankle injury and missed a bulk of training camp. Head coach Bruce Arians named him the backup "money" linebacker behind Bucannon.

He made his professional regular season debut and first career start in the Cardinals' season-opener at the Detroit Lions and recorded a season-high eight combined tackles in their 35–23 loss. Reddick earned the start after Bucannon was declared inactive due to an ankle injury. His first career tackle came on the Lions' first drive as he tackled Lions' running back Ameer Abdullah after a five-yard run in the first quarter. The following week, he collected seven combined tackles in the Cardinals' 16–13 win against the Indianapolis Colts. On November 5, 2017, Reddick was ejected for being involved in a skirmish with Carlos Hyde and finished the game with one solo tackle and a half a sack during their 20–10 victory over the San Francisco 49ers. He made his first career sack with Olsen Pierre, tackling quarterback C. J. Beathard in the first quarter. On November 10, Reddick was fined $9,115 for his role in the brawl. During a Week 14 matchup against the Tennessee Titans, Reddick made three combined tackles and made the first solo sack of his career on quarterback Marcus Mariota as the Cardinals' achieved a 12–7 victory.

In 2018, Reddick played in 16 games with 12 starts, finishing third on the team with 80 tackles.

==== 2020 season ====
On May 3, 2020, the Cardinals declined the fifth-year option on Reddick's contract, making him a free agent in 2021. In Week 6 against the Dallas Cowboys on Monday Night Football, Reddick recorded two sacks on Andy Dalton during the 38–10 win. In Week 14 against the New York Giants, Reddick recorded five sacks and 3 forced fumbles during the 26–7 win. It was an Arizona Cardinals franchise record and brought his season sack total to 10.0. Reddick was named the NFC Defensive Player of the Week for his performance in Week 14. In Week 16 against the 49ers, Reddick recorded 1.5 sacks on C. J. Beathard, including a strip sack that was recovered by the Cardinals, during the 20–12 loss.

=== Carolina Panthers ===
On March 18, 2021, Reddick signed a one-year contract with the Carolina Panthers, reuniting him with head coach Matt Rhule, who coached him at Temple.

=== Philadelphia Eagles ===
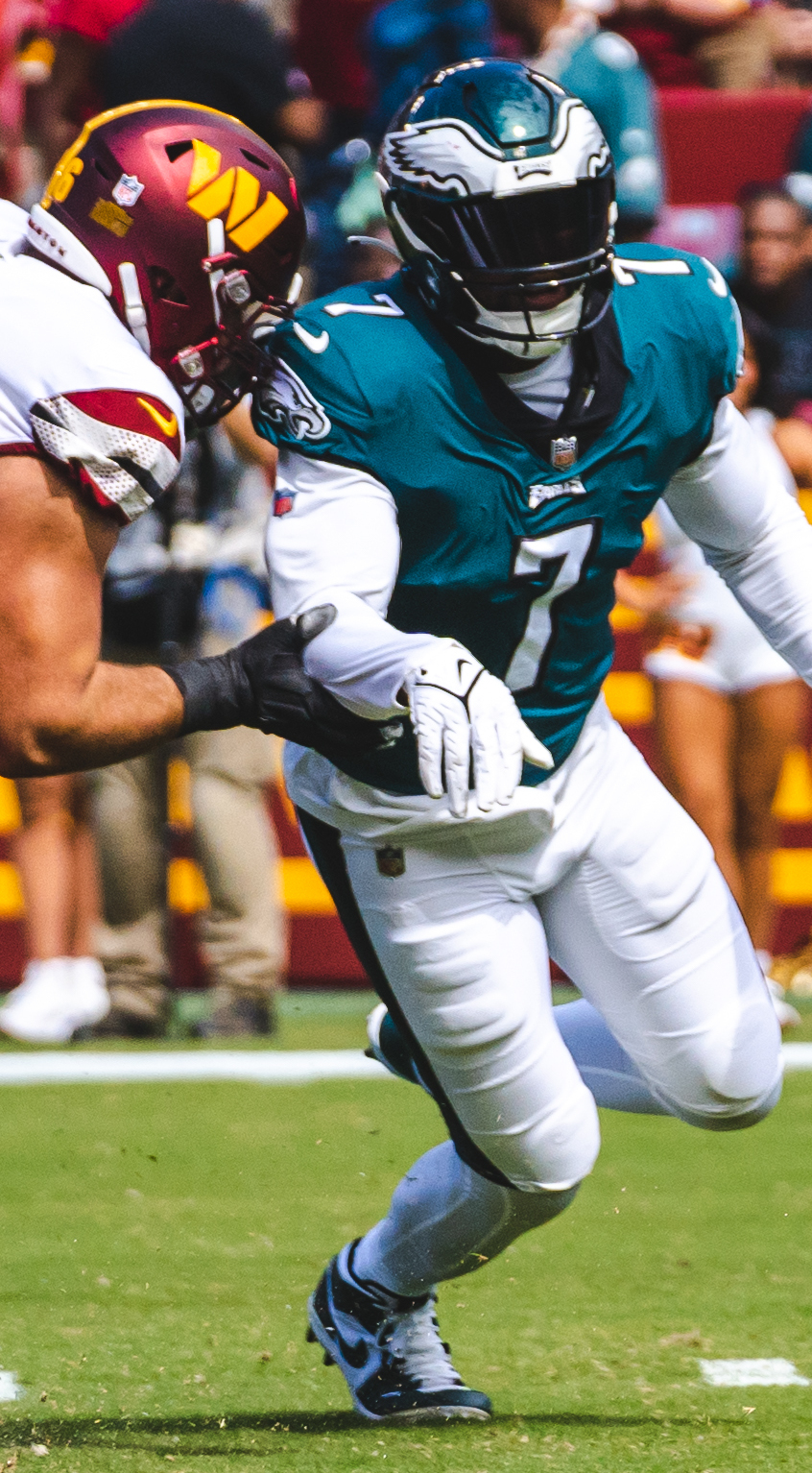
Reddick with the Philadelphia Eagles in 2022

On March 16, 2022, Reddick signed a three-year, $45 million contract with the Philadelphia Eagles. In Week 3 against the Washington Commanders, Reddick recorded 1.5 sacks including a forced fumble in the 24–8 win. The very next week, Reddick forced two sack-fumbles on Trevor Lawrence in the 29–21 win over the Jaguars, earning NFC Defensive Player of the Week. During the 2022 NFC Championship Game, Haason Reddick recorded two sacks, including a crucial strip sack on 49ers quarterback Brock Purdy. The play injured Purdy's throwing arm, resulting in a torn ulnar collateral ligament (UCL) and forcing him to leave the game. Backup quarterback Josh Johnson replaced him for the San Francisco 49ers but later exited with a concussion. This left Purdy to re-enter the game, though he was unable to throw the ball due to his injury. The Eagles went on to secure a 31–7 victory over the 49ers. The Eagles reached Super Bowl LVII. In the Super Bowl, Reddick was limited to one tackle in the Eagles 38–35 loss to the Kansas City Chiefs.

=== New York Jets ===
On April 1, 2024, Reddick was traded to the New York Jets for a conditional 2026 mid-round selection, where if Reddick were to reach 67.5% of playing time and have 10 sacks in 2024, the pick would be a second-round selection. Neither of the conditions were met, leading to the Eagles eventually receiving the Jets' 2026 3rd round pick.

On August 12, Reddick requested a trade from the Jets following a contract holdout that led to Reddick missing the entirety of training camp and the beginning of the regular season. Jets general manager Joe Douglas stated that they would not trade Reddick and that "he is expected to be here with his teammates, and that he will continue to be fined per the CBA if he does not report". On October 15, the Jets permitted Reddick to seek a trade. On October 20, after missing the first six games of the season, Reddick and the Jets agreed to a reworked contract, ending his holdout. Reddick ultimately finished his season having played in 10 games following his holdout and recording only 1 sack.

=== Tampa Bay Buccaneers ===
On March 13, 2025, Reddick signed a one-year, $14 million contract with the Tampa Bay Buccaneers.

== NFL career statistics ==
Legend
	Led the league
**Bold**	Career high

=== Regular season ===
Year	Team	Games		Tackles						Interceptions					Fumbles			
Year	Team	GP	GS	Cmb	Solo	Ast	TFL	Sck	Sfty	Int	Yds	Lng	TD	PD	FF	FR	Yds	TD
2017	ARI	16	3	36	23	13	4	2.5	0	0	0	0	0	0	2	0	0	0
2018	ARI	16	12	**80**	**53**	27	8	4.0	0	0	0	0	0	5	1	0	0	0
2019	ARI	16	5	76	43	**33**	6	1.0	0	0	0	0	0	**6**	0	1	3	0
2020	ARI	16	11	63	43	20	**15**	12.5	0	0	0	0	0	4	**6**	0	0	0
2021	CAR	16	16	68	37	31	12	11.0	0	0	0	0	0	0	2	1	**22**	0
2022	PHI	17	17	49	35	14	11	**16.0**	0	0	0	0	0	3	5	**3**	1	0
2023	PHI	17	17	38	29	9	13	11.0	0	0	0	0	0	1	0	0	0	0
2024	NYJ	10	2	14	9	5	2	1.0	0	0	0	0	0	1	1	0	0	0
2025	TB	13	12	31	18	13	6	2.5	0	0	0	0	0	1	1	0	0	0
Career		137	95	455	290	165	77	61.5	0	0	0	0	0	21	18	5	26	0

=== Postseason ===
Year	Team	Games		Tackles						Interceptions						Fumbles			
Year	Team	GP	GS	Cmb	Solo	Ast	TFL	Sck	Sfty	PD	Int	Yds	Avg	Lng	TD	FF	FR	Yds	TD
2022	PHI	3	3	**9**	**7**	**2**	**2**	**3.5**	0	0	0	0	0	0	0	**1**	**1**	0	0
2023	PHI	1	1	1	0	1	0	0.0	0	0	0	0	0	0	0	0	0	0	0
Career		4	4	10	7	3	2	3.5	0	0	0	0	0	0	0	1	1	0	0

== Personal life ==
In 2022, Reddick provided vocals on the Christmas album A Philly Special Christmas.
