= Kerwynn Williams =

American football player (born 1991)

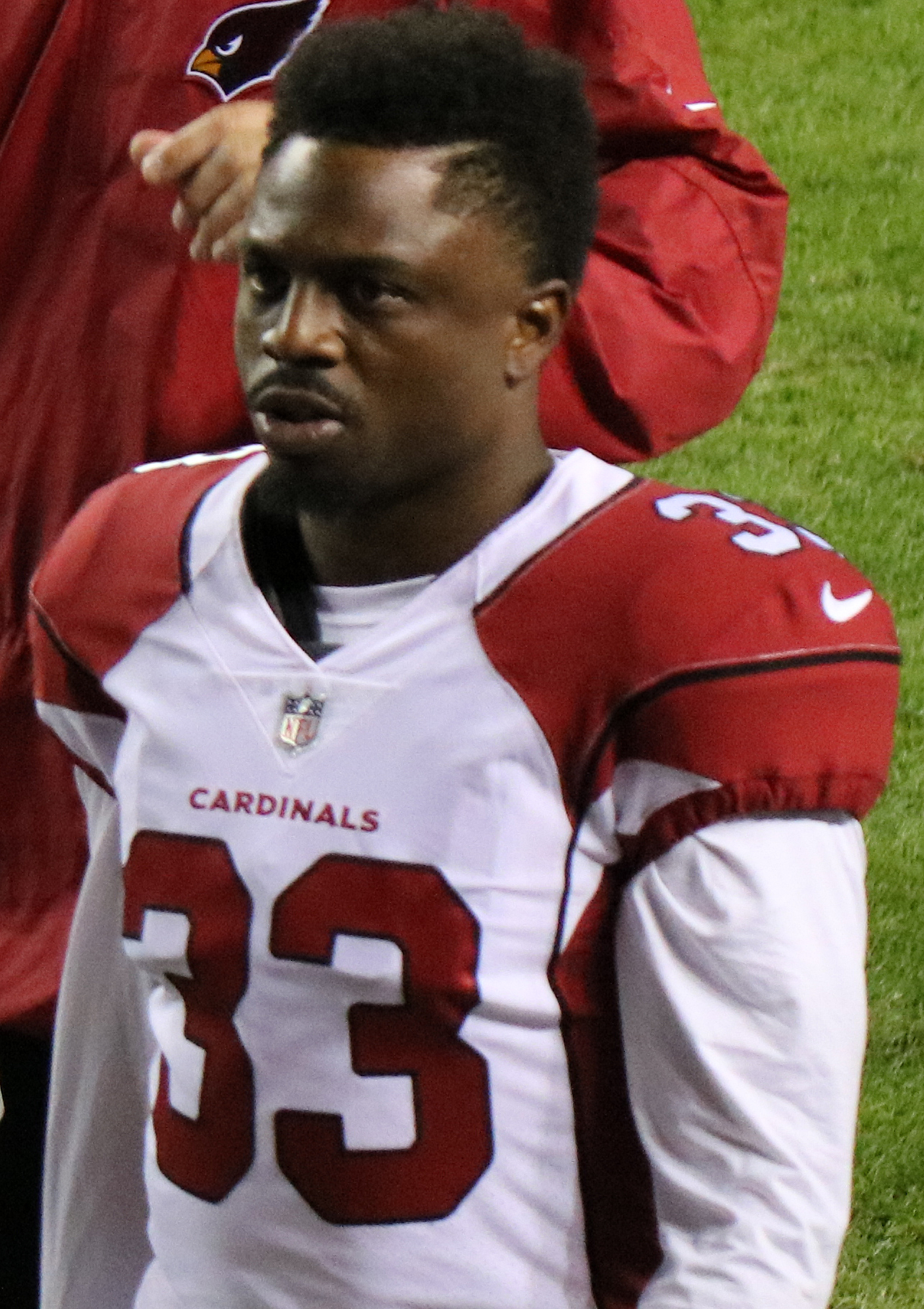
- Williams with the Arizona Cardinals in 2017

No. 37, 33
- Position: Running back

Personal information
- Born: June 9, 1991 (age 35); Las Vegas, Nevada, U.S.
- Listed height: 5 ft 8 in (1.73 m)
- Listed weight: 198 lb (90 kg)

Career information
- High school: Valley (Winchester, Nevada)
- College: Utah State (2009–2012)
- NFL draft: 2013: 7th round, 230th overall pick

Career history
- Indianapolis Colts (2013); San Diego Chargers (2013–2014)*; Arizona Cardinals (2014–2017); Kansas City Chiefs (2018)*; Detroit Lions (2019)*; Tampa Bay Buccaneers (2019)*; New Orleans Saints (2019)*
- * Offseason or practice squad member only

Awards and highlights
- First-team All-WAC (2012)

Career NFL statistics
- Rushing yards: 971
- Rushing average: 4.5
- Rushing touchdowns: 4
- Receptions: 15
- Receiving yards: 126
- Stats at Pro Football Reference

Kerwynn Arthur Logan Williams (born June 9, 1991) is an American former professional football player who was a running back in the National Football League (NFL). He was selected by the Indianapolis Colts in the seventh round of the 2013 NFL draft. He played college football for the Utah State Aggies.

== Early life ==
Williams attended Valley High School in Las Vegas, Nevada. He played wide receiver and running back as a junior before providing a serious triple threat element as a quarterback his senior season with the Vikings football team. He earned first-team All-state accolades as well as first-team All-region and first-team All-Northeast League honors, in addition to being selected as the school's MVP. As a senior, he had 188 rushes for 2,002 yards (10.7 ypc/182.0 ypg) with 31 touchdowns while throwing for 707 yards with three scores and adding 700 return yards. In his junior season, in 2007, he had 108 rushes for 549 yards with six touchdowns as well as 18 receptions for 388 yards with five touchdowns, and also had one punt return for a touchdown in each season. He rushed for over 4,000 yards in his career as well as passing for 830 yards with 48 total touchdowns and 1,150 return yards. In addition to being a student athlete, he excelled in the classroom as an International Baccalaureate student and being involved in various extracurriculars. He also excelled in track and field competing in relays.

== College career ==
Williams attended Utah State University between 2009 and 2012. He spent most of his first three seasons and as a reserve and backup running back. Following the departure of Robert Turbin, he became the starting running back for his senior season. He rushed for 1,512 yards on 218 carries (6.9 ypc) and 15 touchdowns, and caught 45 passes for 697 yards and five touchdowns, earning him first-team All-WAC honors.

For his collegiate career, he accumulated 2,505 rushing yards on 380 carries (6.6 ypc) and 22 touchdowns, and caught 64 passes for 870 yards and five touchdowns. He was an established kick returner early in his career, and Williams would finish his career accumulating 3,408 kick return yards, which ranks first all time in school history, as well as WAC history. He also recorded 6,928 all purpose yards in his career, breaking the old record of 6,659 set by Terance Mathis of New Mexico (1985–1989). Williams graduated from Utah State in December 2012, with a bachelor's degree in marketing from the Jon M. Huntsman School of Business.

== Professional career ==
=== Indianapolis Colts ===
Williams was selected by the Indianapolis Colts in the seventh round, 230th overall, in the 2013 NFL draft. He survived the final roster cuts, making the 53 man roster. Williams was waived on September 1, 2013, to make room for tight end Jack Doyle. On September 2, 2013, he was signed to the Colts' practice squad. On September 14, 2013, Williams was promoted to the active roster after a season-ending injury to Vick Ballard. The next day, he made his NFL debut in the 24–20 loss to the Miami Dolphins. In the game, he handled one kick return for 28 yards. On September 24, 2013, he was released by the Colts, but was re-signed to their practice squad on September 26, 2013.

=== San Diego Chargers ===
On October 9, 2013, Williams was signed by the San Diego Chargers to their practice squad. The Chargers released Williams on August 25, 2014.

=== Arizona Cardinals ===
Williams signed with the Arizona Cardinals practice squad on September 18, 2014. On December 7, 2014, Williams rushed for his first career 100-yard game in a win against the Kansas City Chiefs. On January 3, 2015, in the Wild Card Round against the Carolina Panthers, he had 23 rushing yards in the 27–16 defeat. On September 5, 2015, he was released by the Cardinals. On September 7, 2015, Williams was brought back to the team and was placed on the practice squad. On September 19, 2015, he was promoted to the Cardinals' active roster. On September 22, 2015, Williams was released by the Cardinals. On September 23, 2015, he was re-signed to the Cardinals' practice squad. On December 1, he was elevated to the active roster. On December 6, against the St. Louis Rams, he had 59 rushing yards and a rushing touchdown in the 27–3 victory.

On September 3, 2016, Williams was released by the Cardinals. On October 3, 2016, Williams re-signed with the Cardinals. He was re-signed to cover for injured running back Chris Johnson. He was released by the team on October 6, 2016, and was re-signed on October 11. On December 18, he had 63 rushing yards and a rushing touchdown in the 48–41 loss to the New Orleans Saints. In the regular season finale against the Los Angeles Rams, he had 60 rushing yards and a rushing touchdown.

On September 10, 2017, in the season opening 35–23 loss to the Detroit Lions, Williams came into the game in relief of injured running back David Johnson. He had five carries for ten yards and a touchdown in the loss. He saw limited time until the last five weeks of the season largely due to the injury of veteran running back Adrian Peterson. He recorded 120 carries for 426 rushing yards and one rushing touchdown on the season.

=== Kansas City Chiefs ===
On April 15, 2018, Williams signed with the Kansas City Chiefs. He was released on September 1, 2018.

=== Detroit Lions ===
On January 3, 2019, Williams signed a reserve/future contract with the Detroit Lions. He was waived on May 2, 2019.

=== Tampa Bay Buccaneers ===
On May 6, 2019, Williams signed with the Tampa Bay Buccaneers, but was waived a week later.

=== New Orleans Saints ===
Williams signed with the New Orleans Saints on August 8, 2019. He was released during final roster cuts on August 30, 2019.

== NFL career statistics ==
Year	Team	Games		Rushing					Receiving					Fumbles	
Year	Team	GP	GS	Att	Yds	Avg	Lng	TD	Rec	Yds	Avg	Lng	TD	Fum	Lost
2013	IND	1	0	0	0	0.0	0	0	0	0	0.0	0	0	0	0
2014	ARI	5	0	53	246	4.6	19	0	2	11	5.5	6	0	1	0
2015	ARI	6	0	27	142	5.3	35	1	2	16	8.0	12	0	1	1
2016	ARI	10	0	18	157	8.7	49	2	1	6	6.0	6	0	0	0
2017	ARI	16	6	120	426	3.6	25	1	10	93	9.3	25	0	0	0
Total		38	6	218	971	4.5	49	4	15	126	8.4	25	0	2	1
