= Jarell Carter =

American football player (born 1995)

Profile
- Position: Cornerback

Personal information
- Born: August 7, 1995 (age 31); Houston, Texas
- Listed height: 5 ft 10 in (1.78 m)
- Listed weight: 196 lb (89 kg)

Career information
- High school: Sugar Land (TX) Dulles
- College: Trinity International University
- NFL draft: 2017: undrafted

Career history
- Arizona Cardinals (2017–2018)*; Tennessee Titans (2018)*; Oakland Raiders (2018)*
- * Offseason or practice squad member only
- Stats at Pro Football Reference

Jarell Carter (born August 7, 1995) is an American football cornerback who is currently a free agent. He played college football at Trinity International University.

== College career ==
Carter recorded 156 tackles, 0.5 sacks, 30 interceptions, 28 passes defensed during his time at Trinity International.

== Professional career ==
=== Arizona Cardinals ===
Carter signed with the Arizona Cardinals as an undrafted free agent on July 31, 2017. He was waived by the Cardinals on September 2, 2017. On November 13, 2017, Carter was signed to the Cardinals practice squad He signed a reserve/future contract with the Cardinals on January 2, 2018. He was waived by the Cardinals on May 1, 2018.

=== Tennessee Titans ===
On June 14, 2018, Carter signed with the Tennessee Titans. He was waived on August 11, 2018.

=== Oakland Raiders ===
On August 27, 2018, Carter was signed by the Oakland Raiders. He was waived on September 1, 2018.
