= Deone Bucannon =

American football player (born 1992)

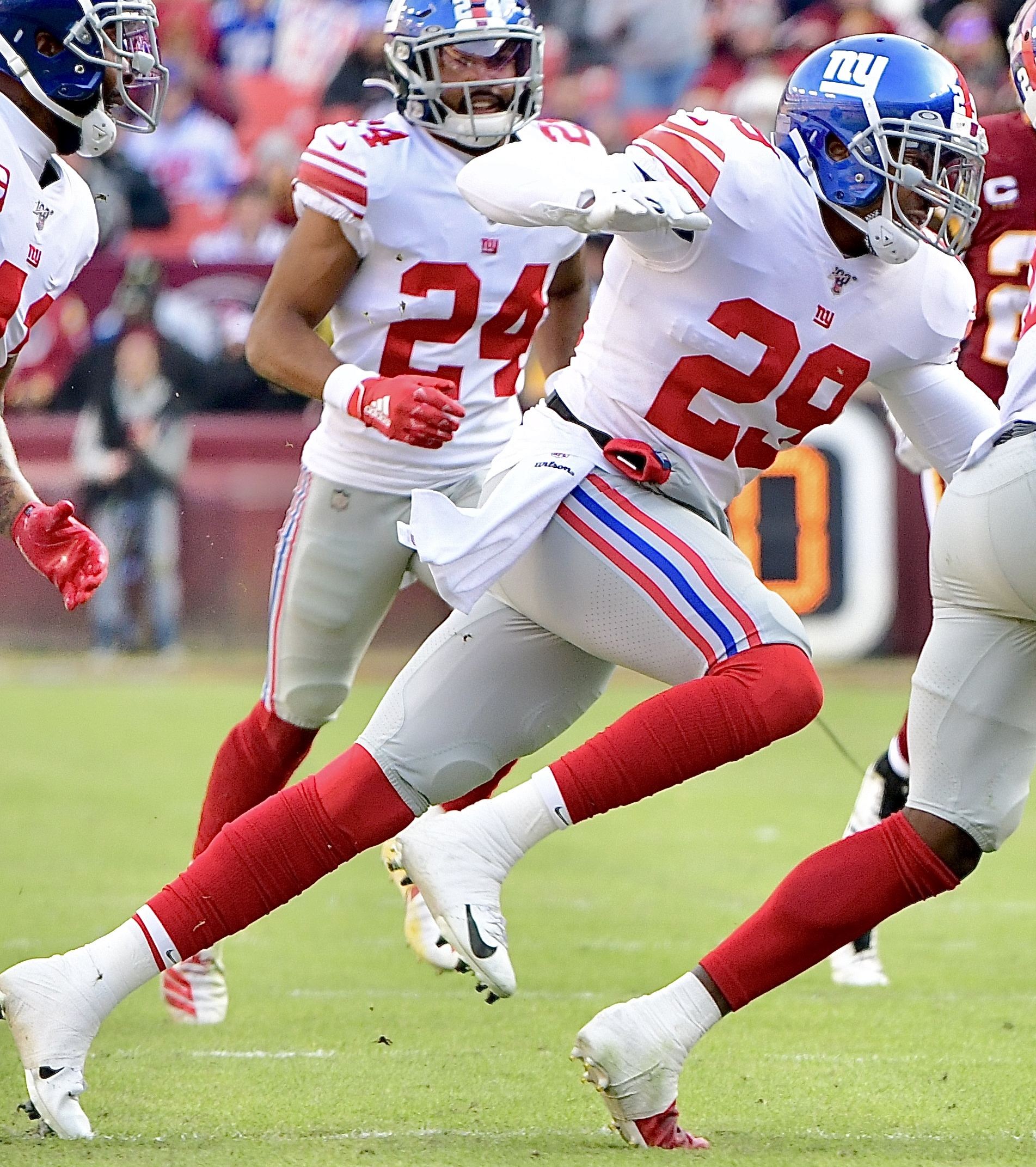
- Bucannon (29) with the New York Giants in 2019

No. 36, 20, 29, 23, 41
- Positions: Linebacker, defensive back

Personal information
- Born: August 30, 1992 (age 34); Oakland, California, U.S.
- Listed height: 6 ft 1 in (1.85 m)
- Listed weight: 211 lb (96 kg)

Career information
- High school: Fairfield (CA) Vanden
- College: Washington State (2010–2013)
- NFL draft: 2014: 1st round, 27th overall pick

Career history
- Arizona Cardinals (2014–2018); Tampa Bay Buccaneers (2019); New York Giants (2019); Atlanta Falcons (2020)*; Tampa Bay Buccaneers (2020)
- * Offseason or practice squad member only

Awards and highlights
- Super Bowl champion (LV); PFWA All-Rookie Team (2014); First-team All-American (2013); First-team All-Pac-12 (2013); Second-team All-Pac-12 (2012)

Career NFL statistics
- Total tackles: 434
- Sacks: 7.0
- Forced fumbles: 7
- Fumble recoveries: 5
- Interceptions: 2
- Defensive touchdowns: 1
- Stats at Pro Football Reference

Deone Ariel Bucannon (pronounced DAY-own) (born August 30, 1992) is an American former professional football player who was a linebacker in the National Football League (NFL). He was selected by the Arizona Cardinals in the first round of the 2014 NFL draft. He played college football for the Washington State Cougars. Originally drafted as a safety, Bucannon transitioned to play a hybrid safety-linebacker role in the Cardinals's 3–4 defense.

== Early life ==
Bucannon attended Vanden High School in Fairfield, California. As a senior, he recorded 107 tackles, including four sacks, and had two interceptions and two fumble recoveries. He also caught 20 passes for 264 yards and a touchdown on offense, and led Vanden to the second round of the CIF Sac-Joaquin Section Division III playoffs. He garnered his second-straight SCAC Defensive Player of the Year honor, in addition to all-league and all-city honors. In his junior year, he totaled 140 tackles, three sacks, three interceptions and two fumble recoveries, winning his first Solano County Athletic Conference Player of the Year award and being named All-CIF Sac-Joaquin Section and City Defensive Player of the Year.

Considered a three-star recruit by Rivals.com, he was rated as the 45th best safety prospect of his class.

== College career ==
Bucannon attended Washington State University from 2010 to 2013. As a senior in 2013, he was a First-team All-Pac-12 Conference and first-team All-American selection. He finished his career with 384 tackles and 15 interceptions.

== Professional career ==
=== Pre-draft ===
Bucannon was considered one of the top safety prospects for the 2014 NFL draft.

External videos
- Deone Buccanon's NFL Combine workout

Pre-draft measurables
Height	Weight	Arm length	Hand span	Wingspan	40-yard dash	10-yard split	20-yard split	20-yard shuttle	Three-cone drill	Vertical jump	Broad jump	Bench press	Wonderlic
6 ft 1 in (1.85 m)	211 lb (96 kg)	32 3/8 in (0.82 m)	9 3/4 in (0.25 m)	6 ft 5 3/4 in (1.97 m)	4.49 s	1.54 s	2.60 s	4.26 s	6.96 s	36.5 in (0.93 m)	10 ft 5 in (3.18 m)	19 reps	15
All values from NFL Combine

External videos
- Cardinals select Buccanon 27th overall

=== Arizona Cardinals ===
==== 2014 ====
Bucannon was selected by the Arizona Cardinals as the 27th pick of the first round of the 2014 NFL draft. On June 5, 2014, he signed a four-year, $7.7 million contract with a $3.92 million signing bonus and $6.23 million guaranteed. The contract also included a fifth-year option.

Bucannon began his first season starting as the strong safety. On September 8, 2014, he earned his first career start in the season opener against the San Diego Chargers and finished his first game with five tackles. During a Week 5 loss to the Denver Broncos, he finished with a season-high seven solo tackles. In a 24–20 win over the Philadelphia Eagles on October 26, he recorded a season-high eight total tackles and a pass deflection. On November 9, 2014, Bucannon, racked up five total tackles (four solo) and his first career sack in a 31–14 victory over the St. Louis Rams. After finishing the season 11–5, the Cardinals played the Carolina Panthers in a Wild-card game on January 3, 2015. In his first playoff game, he recorded six total tackles (five solo) and a pass deflection.

During his rookie season, he finished with 83 total tackles, 66 solo tackles, two sacks, two pass deflections, and a forced fumbles in nine starts and 16 games. He was named to the PFWA All-Rookie Team. Throughout his first season, he split starts with veteran Tony Jefferson.

==== 2015 ====
With so many talented safeties on the Cardinals' roster, Bucannon was supposed to be used as a rotational or back-up strong safety for the 2015 NFL season. After inside linebacker Sean Weatherspoon was injured during training camp, head coach Bruce Arians asked Bucannon to make the switch to inside linebacker. Although undersized for a linebacker, Bucannon proved effective. He was listed as the "$LB" or Money linebacker on the Cardinal's depth chart. On October 11, 2015, Bucannon recorded a season-high 11 tackles (nine solo) in a 42–17 victory over the Detroit Lions. Throughout the first six games, he led his team in tackles.

On November 27, 2015, after a hit on Cincinnati Bengals wide receiver A. J. Green the previous game, Bucannon was fined $23,152 for a hit on a defenseless receiver.

In a Week 10 game against the Seattle Seahawks, he earned his first sack of the season while also recording seven total tackles in a 39–32 victory. On December 20, 2015, Bucannon intercepted Eagles quarterback Sam Bradford and returned it for a 39-yard touchdown, marking the first touchdown in his career. He also finished the game with 11 tackles and a pass deflection in the Cardinal's 40–17 victory over Philadelphia. In 16 starts of 2015, Bucannon recorded 112 tackles, three sacks, two fumble recoveries, three forced fumbles, three passes defended, and an interception returned for a touchdown.

==== 2016 ====
Bucannon started 13 games in 2016, recording 91 tackles and four passes defensed before being placed on injured reserve on December 13, 2016 with an ankle injury.

==== 2017 ====
On April 26, 2017, the Cardinals picked up the fifth-year option on Bucannon's contract. On May 16, it was revealed that Bucannon underwent ankle surgery.

==== 2018 ====
In 2018, Bucannon played in 13 games with six starts, recording a career-low 38 tackles, one sack, and a forced fumble.

=== Tampa Bay Buccaneers (first stint) ===
On March 13, 2019, Bucannon signed with the Tampa Bay Buccaneers on a one year $2.5 million contract. On October 9, 2019, he was released by the Buccaneers.

=== New York Giants ===
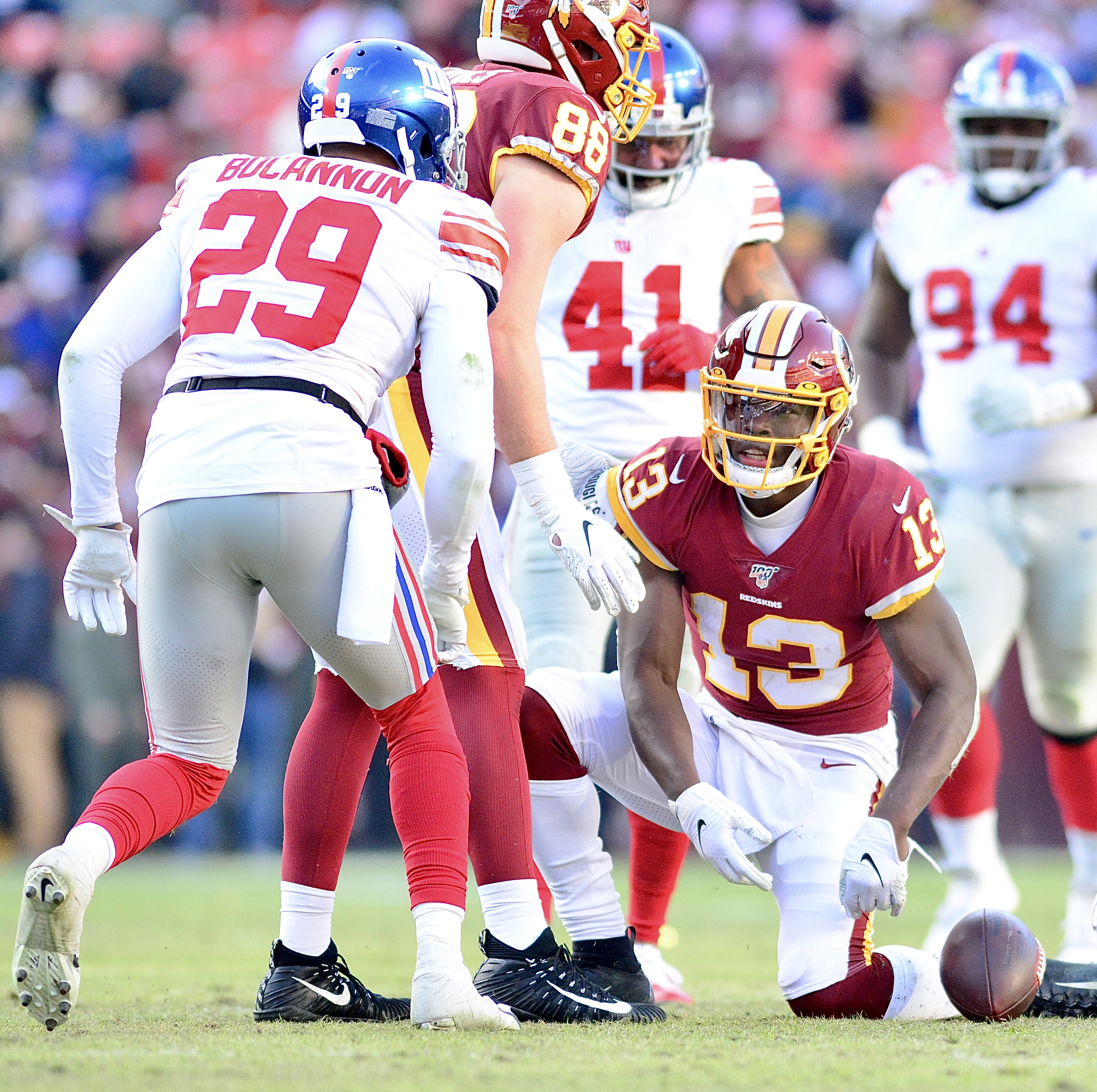
Bucannon with the Giants in 2019

On October 22, 2019, Bucannon signed with the New York Giants.

=== Atlanta Falcons ===
On May 26, 2020, Bucannon signed with the Atlanta Falcons. On September 8, 2020, Bucannon was released and due to new COVID-19 roster management rules, was re-signed to the practice squad the next day. He was released on September 29, 2020.

=== Tampa Bay Buccaneers (second stint) ===
On January 6, 2021, Bucannon signed with the practice squad of the Buccaneers. He was elevated to the active roster on January 8 and January 16 for the team's wild card and divisional playoff games against the Washington Football Team and New Orleans Saints, and reverted to the practice squad after each game. Bucannon was promoted to the active roster on January 19, 2021.

== NFL career statistics ==
Year	Team	Games		Tackles				Fumbles			Interceptions					
Year	Team	GP	GS	Cmb	Solo	Ast	Sck	FF	FR	Yds	Int	Yds	Avg	Lng	TD	PD
2014	ARI	16	9	83	66	17	2.0	1	1	0	0	0	0.0	0	0	2
2015	ARI	16	16	112	93	19	3.0	3	2	0	1	39	39.0	39T	1	3
2016	ARI	13	13	91	66	25	0.0	0	1	0	0	0	0.0	0	0	4
2017	ARI	12	12	82	58	24	1.0	2	0	0	1	39	39.0	39	0	3
2018	ARI	13	6	38	30	8	1.0	1	1	4	0	0	0.0	0	0	0
2019	TB	5	0	3	1	2	0.0	0	0	0	0	0	0.0	0	0	0
2019	NYG	9	1	25	15	10	0.0	0	0	0	0	0	0.0	0	0	0
Total		84	57	434	329	105	7.0	7	5	4	2	78	39.0	39	1	12
