= Karlos Dansby =

American football player (born 1981)

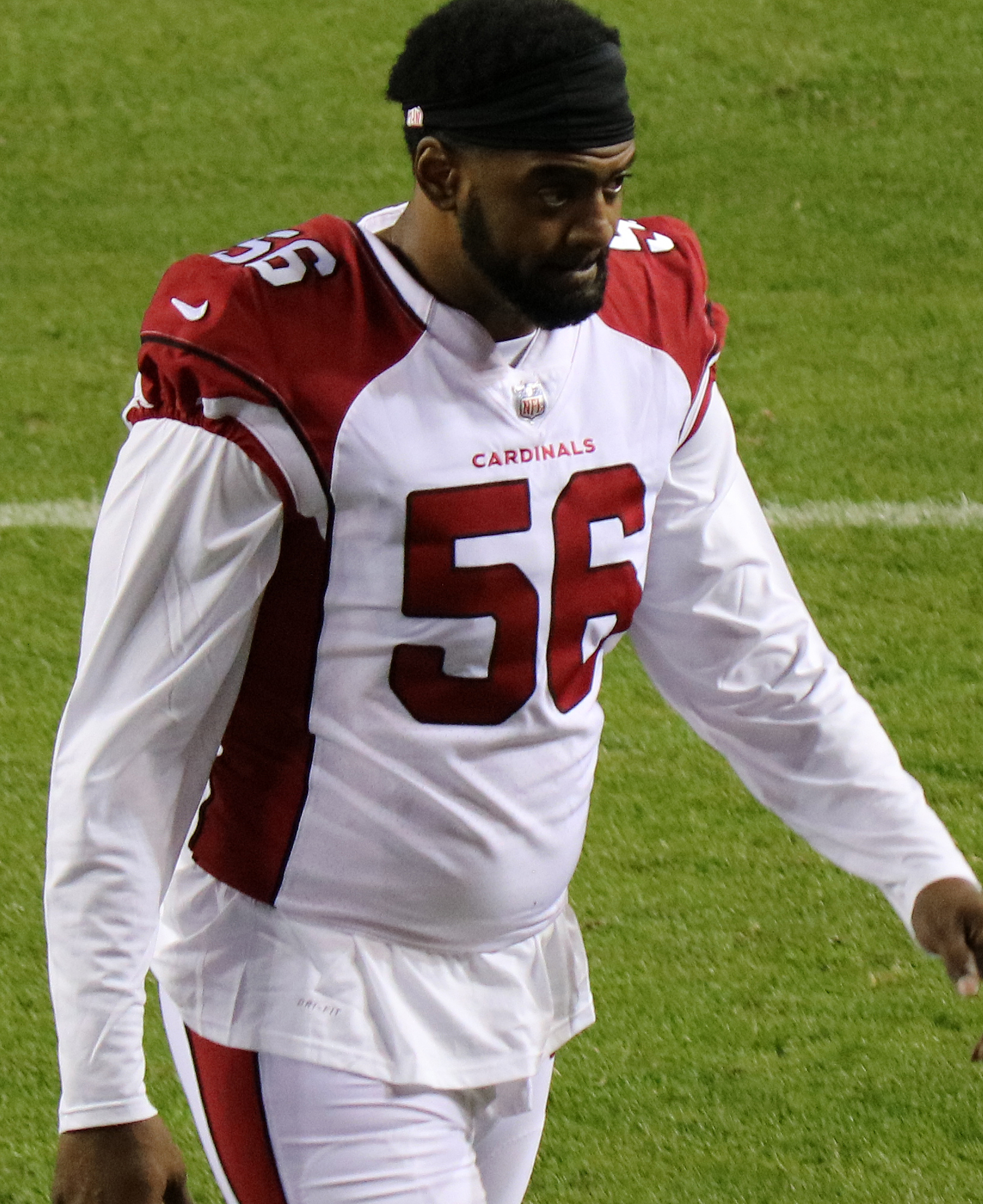
- Dansby with the Arizona Cardinals in 2017

No. 58, 56
- Position: Linebacker

Personal information
- Born: November 3, 1981 (age 45); Birmingham, Alabama, U.S.
- Listed height: 6 ft 4 in (1.93 m)
- Listed weight: 250 lb (113 kg)

Career information
- High school: Woodlawn (Birmingham)
- College: Auburn (2000–2003)
- NFL draft: 2004: 2nd round, 33rd overall pick

Career history
- Arizona Cardinals (2004–2009); Miami Dolphins (2010–2012); Arizona Cardinals (2013); Cleveland Browns (2014–2015); Cincinnati Bengals (2016); Arizona Cardinals (2017)

Awards and highlights
- Second-team All-Pro (2013); PFWA All-Rookie Team (2004); First-team All-American (2003); 2× First-team All-SEC (2002, 2003)

Career NFL statistics
- Total tackles: 1,422
- Sacks: 43.0
- Forced fumbles: 18
- Fumble recoveries: 12
- Interceptions: 20
- Defensive touchdowns: 6
- Stats at Pro Football Reference

Karlos Montez Dansby (born November 3, 1981) is an American former professional football player who was a linebacker in the National Football League (NFL). He played college football for the Auburn Tigers and received All-American recognition. He was selected by the Arizona Cardinals in the second round of the 2004 NFL draft, and also played in the NFL for the Miami Dolphins, Cleveland Browns, and Cincinnati Bengals.

== Early life ==
Dansby was an All-State linebacker and wide receiver at Woodlawn High School in Birmingham, Alabama, where he was a letterman in football, basketball, and track. He caught 51 passes for 857 yards and five touchdowns on offense, 81 tackles, six sacks, three interceptions, and two fumble recoveries on defense as a senior. In basketball, he played as a power forward, earning All-state honors as a junior. In track & field, he competed in the jumping events and got a PR of 6.73 meters in the long jump as a junior.

== College career ==
Dansby played for the Auburn Tigers football team while attending Auburn University from 2000 to 2003. He was a Butkus Award semi-finalist regarded as one of the premier defenders in college football. While he began his Auburn career at wide receiver, he shifted to outside linebacker as a sophomore. In 36 games for the Tigers, he recorded 218 tackles (128 solos) with 10 quarterback sacks, 31 stops for losses, seven forced fumbles, two fumble recoveries, 15 pass deflections, and eight interceptions for 107 yards in returns. He was First-team All-America and a first-team All-Southeastern Conference selection as a senior when he had 84 tackles (50 solo), 5.5 sacks, 13 stops for losses, 6 pass deflections, 4 caused fumbles. In 2002, he was a First-team All-SEC with 76 tackles (32 solo), 4 sacks, 10 stops for losses, 3 interceptions, 4 pass deflections, 2 fumble recoveries, and 2 caused fumbles.

== Professional career ==
Pre-draft measurables
Height	Weight	Arm length	Hand span	40-yard dash	20-yard shuttle	Three-cone drill	Vertical jump	Broad jump	Bench press	Wonderlic
6 ft 3 1/4 in (1.91 m)	257 lb (117 kg)	33 3/8 in (0.85 m)	10 in (0.25 m)	4.60 s	4.49 s	7.53 s	34.5 in (0.88 m)	10 ft 0 in (3.05 m)	15 reps	15
All values from NFL Combine/Auburn's Pro Day

=== Arizona Cardinals (first stint) ===
The Arizona Cardinals selected Dansby in the second round (33rd overall) of the 2004 NFL draft. Dansby was the third linebacker drafted in 2004.

On August 4, 2004, the Arizona Cardinals signed Dansby to a four-year, $3.95 million contract that includes a signing bonus of $2.45 million.

Throughout training camp, Dansby competed to be a starting outside linebacker against Levar Woods. Head coach Dennis Green named Dansby the backup outside linebacker to start the regular season in 2004, behind Levar Woods and James Darling.

He started in the Arizona Cardinals' season-opener at the St. Louis Rams and made two solo tackles in their 17–10 loss. On September 26, 2004, Dansby earned his first career start after surpassing Levar Woods on the Cardinals' depth chart. Dansby recorded four combined tackles and made his first career sack on quarterback Michael Vick during a 6–3 loss at the Atlanta Falcons in Week 3. In Week 7, he recorded two combined tackles, two pass deflections, and made his first career interception during a 25–17 victory against the Seattle Seahawks. On November 14, 2004, Dansby recorded five solo tackles, deflected a pass, and made two sacks on quarterback Kurt Warner before exiting in the fourth quarter of the Cardinals' 17–14 victory against the New York Giants in Week 10. He was inactive during the Cardinals' Week 11 loss at the Carolina Panthers due to a neck injury he sustained the previous week. In Week 13, he collected a season-high seven solo tackles in a 26–12 loss at the Detroit Lions. Dansby finished his rookie season in 2004 with 60 combined tackles (43 solo), five sacks, five pass deflections, an interception, and a forced fumble in 15 games and 11 starts.

Dansby entered training camp slated as a starting outside linebacker in 2005. Head coach Dennis Green named Dansby and Orlando Huff the starting outside linebackers to start the regular season. He started in the Arizona Cardinals' season-opener against the New York Giants and recorded three solo tackles, two pass deflections, two interceptions, a sack, and scored the first touchdown of his career during a 42–19 loss. Dansby intercepted a pass by Giants' quarterback Eli Manning and returned it for an 18-yard touchdown in the second quarter. In Week 7, he collected a season-high 11 combined tackles (nine solo) and made a sack in the Cardinals' 20–10 victory against the Tennessee Titans. He was sidelined during a Week 11 victory at the St. Louis Rams after suffering a groin injury. On December 24, 2005, he made four solo tackles, a pass deflection, and returned an interception by quarterback Mike McMahon for an 11-yard touchdown in a 27–21 win against the Philadelphia Eagles. He finished the 2005 season with 88 combined tackles (69 solo), four sacks, four pass deflections, three interceptions, and two touchdowns in 15 games and 15 starts.

In 2007, he started all 14 games he played and led team with 117 tackles, marking second season with 100+ tackles (103 in 2005). On February 14, 2008, he was given the Cardinals' franchise tag. He has been franchised twice by Arizona, in 2008 and 2009. Cardinals signed franchised Dansby to a one-year, $8.065 million contract. In 2008, Dansby led the Cardinals to the Super Bowl while again totaling over 100 tackles and making 4 sacks and intercepting two passes. Karlos Dansby's 2009 franchise tag guaranteed him $9.7 million in salary in 2009 and would make him an unrestricted free agent in 2010.

In a first-round playoff game against the Green Bay Packers on January 10, 2010, Dansby recovered a fumble in overtime by Green Bay quarterback Aaron Rodgers and returned it 17 yards for the game-winning touchdown in the highest scoring game in NFL postseason history.

=== Miami Dolphins ===
On March 5, 2010, Dansby signed with the Miami Dolphins to a five-year, $43 million contract with $22 million guaranteed, which made it the richest contract for an inside linebacker in NFL history until Patrick Willis signed a five-year, $50 million contract with the San Francisco 49ers. Dansby was released from the team on March 12, 2013.

=== Arizona Cardinals (second stint) ===
On May 10, 2013, Dansby signed a one-year deal to return to the Cardinals.

=== Cleveland Browns ===
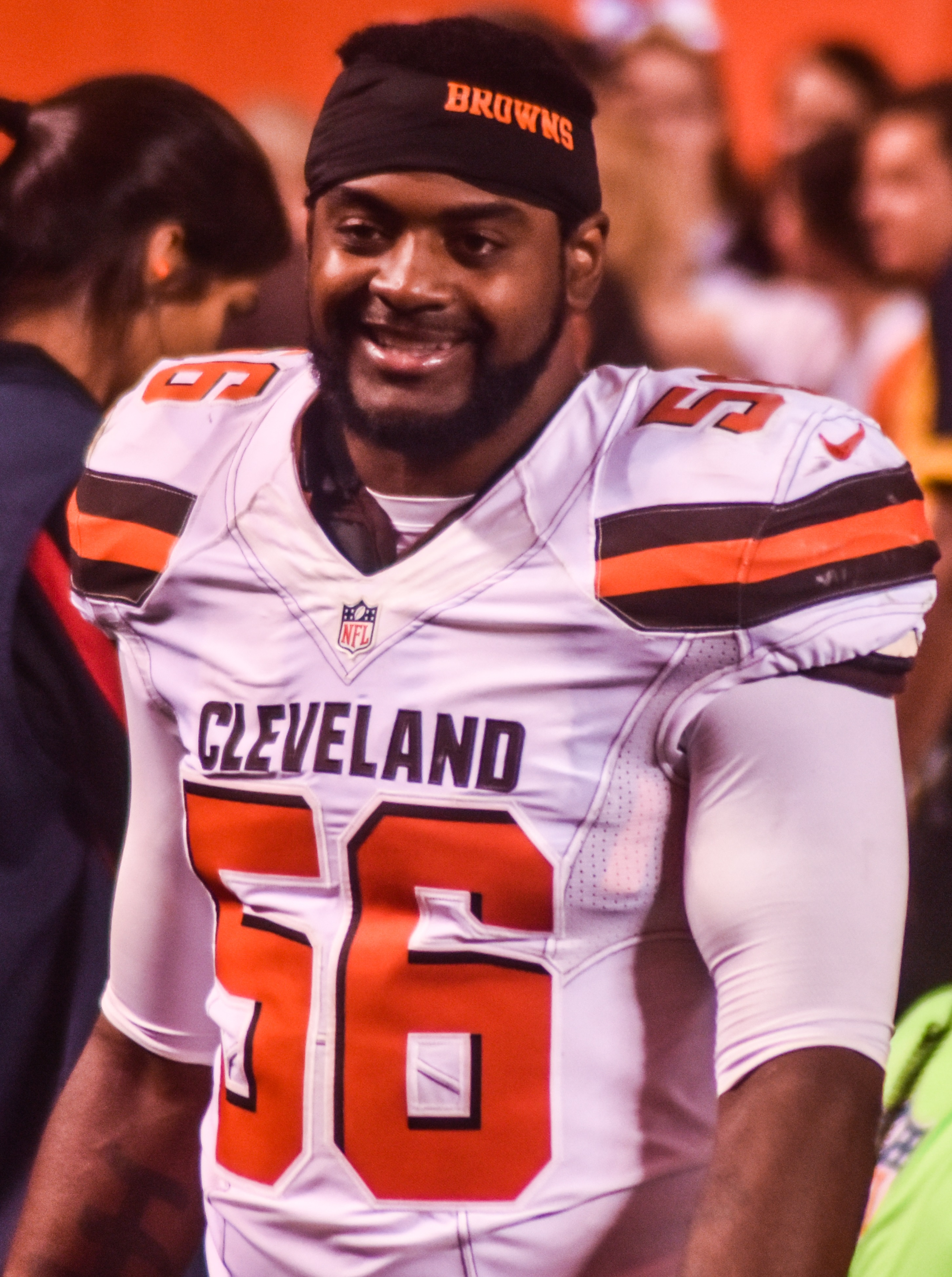
Dansby with the Browns in 2015.

On March 11, 2014, Dansby signed a four-year, $24 million contract with the Cleveland Browns. The deal included $14 million guaranteed.

He was released by the Browns on March 16, 2016.

=== Cincinnati Bengals ===
Dansby signed with the Cincinnati Bengals on March 29, 2016.

=== Arizona Cardinals (third stint) ===
On March 10, 2017, Dansby signed a one-year contract with the Cardinals. In Week 9, Dansby picked off C. J. Beathard in a 20–10 win over the San Francisco 49ers, earning him NFC Defensive Player of the Week. Dansby retired at the end of the season having never been selected for a Pro Bowl despite having more career tackles than Hall of Famer Brian Urlacher; he had 1,422 tackles to Urlacher's 1,361. However, he played on mostly mediocre teams for most of his career; he only made the playoffs twice and played on a winning team only one other time.

== NFL career statistics ==
Year	Team	GP	Tackles				Fumbles			Interceptions					
Year	Team	GP	Cmb	Solo	Ast	Sck	FF	FR	Yds	Int	Yds	Avg	Lng	TD	PD
2004	ARI	15	60	43	17	5.0	1	3	0	1	2	2.0	2	0	5
2005	ARI	15	88	69	19	4.0	2	2	0	3	31	10.3	18	2	4
2006	ARI	14	82	69	13	8.0	2	1	0	0	0	0.0	0	0	3
2007	ARI	14	97	77	20	3.5	4	0	0	3	55	18.3	28	0	8
2008	ARI	16	119	95	24	4.0	2	3	0	2	47	23.5	34	0	5
2009	ARI	16	109	89	20	1.0	1	0	0	1	11	11.0	11	0	4
2010	MIA	14	95	78	17	3.0	2	0	0	0	0	0.0	0	0	4
2011	MIA	16	103	88	15	2.0	1	0	0	1	14	14.0	14	0	4
2012	MIA	16	134	101	33	1.0	0	0	0	0	0	0.0	0	0	9
2013	ARI	16	122	114	8	6.5	1	1	0	4	48	12.0	23	2	19
2014	CLE	12	93	47	46	3.0	0	0	0	1	0	0.0	0	0	2
2015	CLE	16	108	62	46	0.0	2	0	0	3	93	31.0	52	2	6
2016	CIN	16	114	69	45	1.0	0	1	0	0	0	0.0	0	0	6
2017	ARI	16	95	74	21	1.0	0	1	0	1	4	4.0	4	0	4
Career		212	1,417	1,073	344	43.0	20	12	0	20	305	15.3	52	6	79
