= 2017 Seattle Seahawks season =

American football team season

- Owner: Paul Allen
- General manager: John Schneider
- Head coach: Pete Carroll
- Home stadium: CenturyLink Field

Results
- Record: 9–7
- Division place: 2nd NFC West
- Playoffs: Did not qualify
- All-Pros: 3: LB Bobby Wagner (1st team); S Earl Thomas (2nd team); KR Tyler Lockett (2nd team)
- Pro Bowlers: 7: QB Russell Wilson; WR Doug Baldwin; TE Jimmy Graham; T Duane Brown; DE Michael Bennett; MLB Bobby Wagner; FS Earl Thomas

Uniform
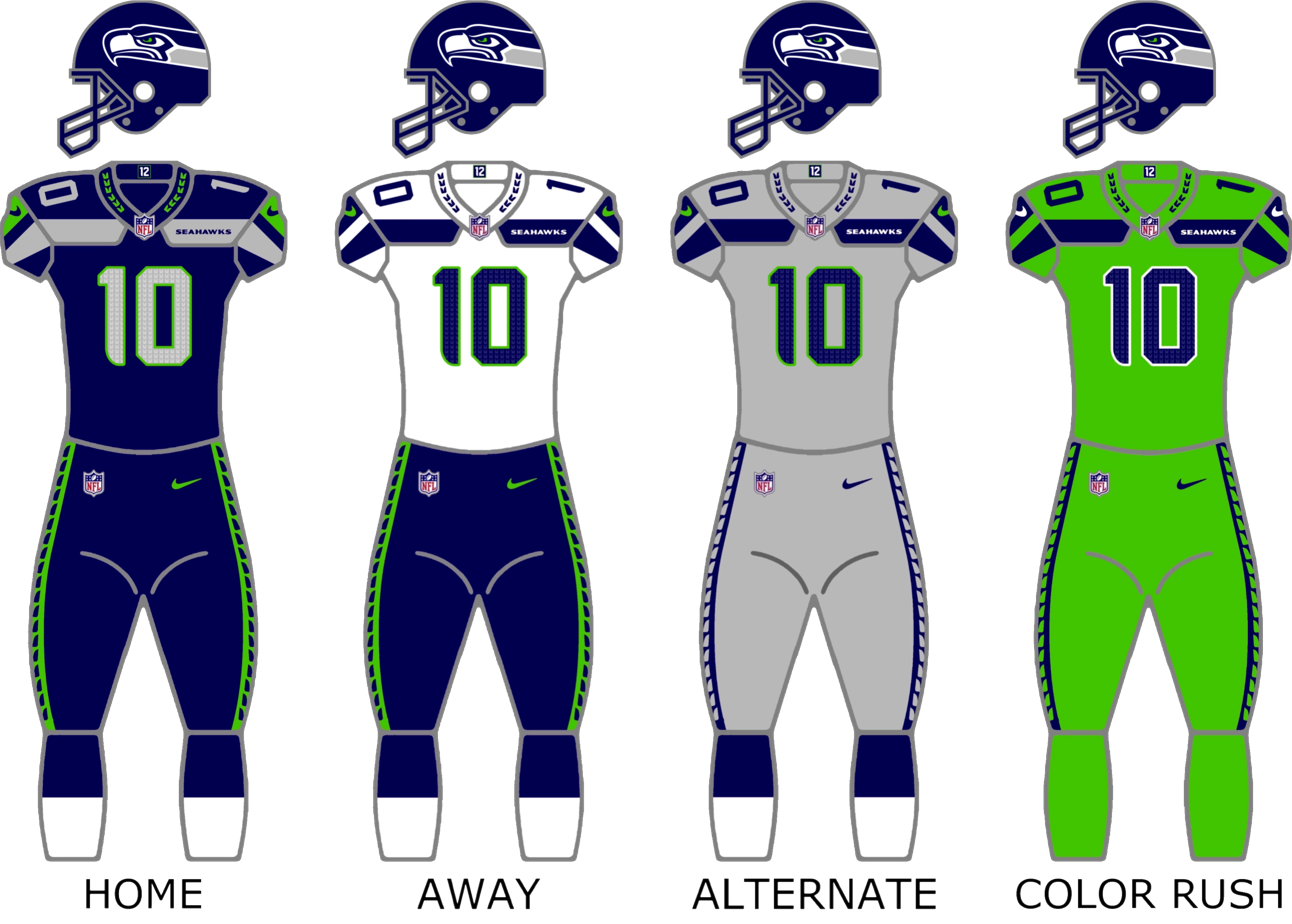

The 2017 season was the Seattle Seahawks' 42nd in the National Football League (NFL) and their eighth under head coach Pete Carroll. The Seahawks tried to improve their 10–5–1 record from 2016. However, it did not happen because of injuries to key defensive players and poor offensive and special teams performances. After the Atlanta Falcons' Week 17 win over the Carolina Panthers, they were eliminated from playoff contention for the first time since 2011. They also failed to achieve a 10-win season for the first time since that same season. This was Russell Wilson's first season not making the playoffs.

During the season, Russell Wilson broke Eli Manning's NFL record for most 4th quarter touchdowns in a single season with 18; the previous record was 15. Wilson also led the NFL in touchdown passes with 34.

This was also the final season of the original Legion of Boom playing together, as well as the 21st and last full season under the ownership of Paul Allen, who died during the 2018 season.

== Roster changes ==
=== Free agents ===
==== Unrestricted ====
Position	Player	2017 team	Notes
K	Steven Hauschka	Buffalo Bills	Signed with the Bills on March 10
WR	Devin Hester	Retired	Retired
DT	John Jenkins	Chicago Bears	Signed with the Bears on March 17
S	Jeron Johnson	Jacksonville Jaguars	Signed with the Jaguars on August 6
S	Kelcie McCray		
DT	Tony McDaniel	New Orleans Saints	Signed with the Saints on June 15
DE	Damontre Moore	Dallas Cowboys	Signed with the Cowboys on March 12
FB	Marcel Reece	Seattle Seahawks	Re-signed on July 29, released on September 2
OT	Bradley Sowell	Chicago Bears	Signed with the Bears on May 2
CB	Neiko Thorpe	Seattle Seahawks	Re-signed on March 14
FB	Will Tukuafu		
TE	Brandon Williams	Indianapolis Colts	Signed with the Colts on March 20
TE	Luke Willson	Seattle Seahawks	Re-signed on March 17

==== Restricted ====
Position	Player	2017 Team	Notes
LB	Brock Coyle	San Francisco 49ers	Signed with the 49ers on March 10
OT	Garry Gilliam	San Francisco 49ers	Signed with the 49ers on April 18
LB	Mike Morgan	Seattle Seahawks	Re-signed on July 31
CB	Mohammed Seisay		
CB	DeShawn Shead	Seattle Seahawks	Signed tender on March 17
S	Steven Terrell	Kansas City Chiefs	Signed with the Chiefs on July 6

==== Exclusive-Rights ====
Position	Player	2017 Team	Notes
DE	Tavaris Barnes	Tampa Bay Buccaneers	Signed with the Buccaneers on May 31
FB	Brandon Cottom	Seattle Seahawks	Signed tender on May 4
CB	Stanley Jean-Baptiste	Jacksonville Jaguars	Signed with the Jaguars on July 25
RB	Terrence Magee	Seattle Seahawks	Signed tender on April 18
LB	Dewey McDonald	Seattle Seahawks	Signed tender on March 28
RB	Troymaine Pope	Seattle Seahawks	Signed tender on April 18
TE	Ronnie Shields		
WR	Tyler Slavin		
TE	Joe Sommers		

=== Signings ===
Position	Player	2016 Team	Notes
CB	Perrish Cox	Tennessee Titans	Signed January 18
K	Blair Walsh	Minnesota Vikings	Signed February 9
OG	Luke Joeckel	Jacksonville Jaguars	Signed March 9
RB	Eddie Lacy	Green Bay Packers	Signed March 14
OG	Oday Aboushi	Houston Texans	Signed March 17
LB	Arthur Brown	New York Jets	Signed March 17
S	Bradley McDougald	Tampa Bay Buccaneers	Signed March 22
K	John Lunsford	Free Agent	Signed March 22
LB	Michael Wilhoite	San Francisco 49ers	Signed March 23
LB	Terence Garvin	Washington Redskins	Signed March 24
DE	Dion Jordan	Miami Dolphins	Signed April 11
LB	Kache Palacio	Seattle Seahawks	Signed April 18
QB	Jake Heaps	Free Agent	Signed May 1
DE	David Bass	Tennessee Titans	Signed May 8
RB	Mike Davis	San Francisco 49ers	Signed May 8
TE	Bryce Williams	Los Angeles Rams	Signed May 10
CB	Marcus Cromartie	San Francisco 49ers	Signed May 31
QB	Austin Davis	Denver Broncos	Signed June 5
DE	Marcus Smith	Philadelphia Eagles	Signed July 29
DT	Rodney Coe	Jacksonville Jaguars	Signed July 30
WR	Jamel Johnson	Green Bay Packers	Signed August 3
DT	Greg Milhouse	New York Giants	Signed August 9
DE	Christian French	Free Agent	Signed August 10
WR	Rodney Smith	Seattle Seahawks	Signed August 13
CB	Tramaine Brock	San Francisco 49ers	Signed August 16
OT	Tyrus Thompson	Carolina Panthers	Signed August 21
DE	Dwight Freeney	Atlanta Falcons	Signed October 24

Indicates that the player was a free agent at the end of his respective team's 2016 season.

=== Trades ===
Player/compensation received	Player/compensation sent	Team	Notes
5th round pick (2018 draft)	Marshawn Lynch; 6th round pick (2018 draft)	Oakland Raiders	Trade finalized on April 26
D. J. Alexander	Kevin Pierre-Louis	Kansas City Chiefs	Trade finalized on July 28
Matt Tobin; 7th round pick (2018 draft)	5th round pick (2018 draft)	Philadelphia Eagles	Trade finalized on August 21
Justin Coleman	7th round pick (2018 draft)	New England Patriots	Trade finalized on September 1
Sheldon Richardson; 7th round pick (2018 draft)	Jermaine Kearse; 2nd round pick (2018 draft); 7th round pick (2018 draft)	New York Jets	Trade finalized on September 1
7th round pick (2018 draft)	Tramaine Brock	Minnesota Vikings	Trade finalized on September 2
5th round pick (2018 draft); 7th round pick (2018 draft)	Cassius Marsh	New England Patriots	Trade finalized on September 2
Isaiah Battle	7th round pick (2018 draft)	Kansas City Chiefs	Trade finalized on September 2
Duane Brown; 5th round pick (2018 draft)	3rd round pick (2018 draft); 2nd round pick (2019 draft)	Houston Texans	Trade finalized on October 31

=== Draft ===
2017 Seattle Seahawks draft
Round	Selection	Player	Position	College	Notes
1	None				(Note: The Seahawks traded their original first-round selection (No. 26 overall) to the Atlanta Falcons in exchange for the Falcons' first-, third- and seventh-round selections – Nos. 31, 95 and 249 overall, respectively. The Seahawks later traded the No. 31 selection to the San Francisco 49ers in exchange for the 49ers' second- and fourth-round selections – Nos. 34 and 111 overall, respectively. The Seahawks then traded the No. 34 selection to the Jacksonville Jaguars in exchange for the Jaguars' second- and sixth-round selections – Nos. 35 and 187 overall, respectively.)
2	35	Malik McDowell	DT	Michigan State	
2	58	Ethan Pocic	C	LSU	
3	90	Shaquill Griffin	CB	Central Florida	
3	95	Lano Hill	S	Michigan	
3	102 *	Nazair Jones	DT	North Carolina	
3	106 *	Amara Darboh	WR	Michigan	
4	111	Tedric Thompson	S	Colorado	(Note: The Seahawks traded their original fourth-round selection – No. 131 overall, along with their 2016 seventh-round selection to the New England Patriots in exchange for the Patriots' 2016 fifth- and seventh-round selections.)
5	None				(Note: The Seahawks forfeited their fifth-round selection as the punishment for violating the NFL's collective bargaining agreement regarding off-season workout policies that occurred during the 2016 off-season.)
6	187	Mike Tyson	S	Cincinnati	
6	210	Justin Senior	OT	Mississippi State	
7	226	David Moore	WR	East Central	(Note: The Seahawks acquired an additional seventh-round selection (No. 226 overall) in a trade that sent wide receiver Kevin Norwood to the Carolina Panthers.)
7	249	Chris Carson	RB	Oklahoma State	

*	Compensatory selection

Draft trades

=== Undrafted free agents ===
All undrafted free agents were signed after the 2017 NFL draft concluded on April 29, unless noted otherwise.

2017 Seattle Seahawks Undrafted Free Agents
Player	Position	College	Notes
FB	Algernon Brown	BYU	waived July 29
OT	Darrell Brown	Louisiana Tech	signed August 7, waived September 2
LB	Rodney Butler	New Mexico State	signed August 16, waived September 2
TE	Steve Donatell	Western Kentucky	signed June 8, waived September 1
WR	Cyril Grayson	LSU	fifth-year senior and did not play football, signed April 10, waived September 2
QB	Skyler Howard	West Virginia	waived May 15
DT	Jeremy Liggins	Ole Miss	waived September 2
WR	Speedy Noil	Texas A&M	signed May 15, waived May 31
LB	Otha Peters	Louisiana-Lafayette	waived September 2
WR	Darreus Rogers	USC	waived September 2
OG	Jordan Roos	Purdue	
SS	Jordan Simone	Arizona State	signed May 31, waived August 7, signed August 9, waived/injured August 16
TE	Tyrone Swoopes	Texas	waived September 2
LB	Nick Usher	UTEP	waived July 29

== Staff ==
2017 Seattle Seahawks staff
Front office: Chairman – Paul Allen; President – Peter McLoughlin; Executive vice president/general manager – John Schneider; Vice president of football administration – Matt Thomas; Co-director of player personnel – Scott Fitterer; Co-director of player personnel – Trent Kirchner; Director of college scouting – Matt Berry; Director of pro personnel – Dan Morgan; Assistant director of pro personnel – Nolan Teasley; Consultant – Mike Pettine; Head coaches: Head coach/executive vice president of football operations – Pete Carroll; Assistant head coach/offensive line – Tom Cable; Assistant head coach/linebackers – Micheal Barrow; Offensive coaches: Offensive coordinator – Darrell Bevell; Quarterbacks – Carl Smith; Assistant quarterbacks – Will Harriger; Running backs – Chad Morton; Wide receivers – Dave Canales; Assistant wide receivers – Nate Carroll; Tight ends – Pat McPherson; Assistant offensive line – Pat Ruel; Assistant offensive line – Brennan Carroll; Offensive assistant – Lemuel Jeanpierre	Defensive coaches: Defensive coordinator – Kris Richard; Defensive line – Clint Hurtt; Assistant defensive line – Dwaine Board; Assistant linebackers – John Glenn; Secondary – Nick Sorensen; Defensive backs – Andre Curtis; Assistant defensive backs – Ricky Manning Jr.; Senior defensive assistant – Travis Jones; Defensive quality control – Tom Donatell; Special teams coaches: Special teams coordinator – Brian Schneider; Assistant special teams – Heath Farwell; Strength and conditioning: Head strength and conditioning – Chris Carlisle; Assistant strength and conditioning – Mondray Gee; Assistant strength and conditioning – Jamie Yancher

== Final roster ==
2017 Seattle Seahawks roster
Quarterbacks (QB): 6 Austin Davis; 3 Russell Wilson; Running backs (RB): 39 Mike Davis; 27 Eddie Lacy; 21 J. D. McKissic; 34 Thomas Rawls; Wide receivers (WR): 89 Doug Baldwin; 84 Amara Darboh; 16 Tyler Lockett; 19 Tanner McEvoy; 83 David Moore; 10 Paul Richardson; Tight ends (TE): 88 Jimmy Graham; 46 Tyrone Swoopes; 81 Nick Vannett; 82 Luke Willson	Offensive linemen (OL): 68 Justin Britt C; 76 Duane Brown T; 53 Joey Hunt C; 65 Germain Ifedi T; 78 Luke Joeckel G; 77 Ethan Pocic C; 64 Jordan Roos G; 73 Matt Tobin T; Defensive linemen (DL): 72 Michael Bennett DE; 55 Frank Clark DE; 93 Branden Jackson DE; 99 Quinton Jefferson DE; 95 Dion Jordan DE; 90 Jarran Reed DT; 91 Sheldon Richardson DT; 98 Garrison Smith DT; 97 Marcus Smith DE	Linebackers (LB): 58 D. J. Alexander OLB; 47 Paul Dawson MLB; 52 Terence Garvin OLB; 54 Bobby Wagner MLB; 57 Michael Wilhoite OLB; 50 K. J. Wright OLB; Defensive backs (DB): 28 Justin Coleman CB; 35 DeShawn Shead CB; 26 Shaquill Griffin CB; 42 Lano Hill SS; 20 Jeremy Lane CB; 41 Byron Maxwell CB; 30 Bradley McDougald SS; 29 Earl Thomas FS; 33 Tedric Thompson FS; 23 Neiko Thorpe CB; 40 Mike Tyson CB; Special teams (ST): 69 Tyler Ott LS; 9 Jon Ryan P; 7 Blair Walsh K	Practice squad: 79 Isaiah Battle T; 66 Willie Beavers G; 2 Trevone Boykin QB; 43 Alex Carter SS; 43 Jalston Fowler FB; 13 Cyril Grayson WR; 36 Akeem King CB (PS/I); 67 Noble Nwachukwu DE; 49 Kache Palacio MLB; 48 Jason Thompson OLB; Reserve: 75 Oday Aboushi G (IR); 56 Cliff Avril DE (IR); 32 Chris Carson RB (IR); 31 Kam Chancellor SS (IR); 21 DeAndre Elliott CB (IR); 74 George Fant T (IR); 59 Josh Forrest OLB (IR); -- Christian French DE (IR); 92 Nazair Jones DT (IR); 38 Tre Madden FB (IR); 94 Malik McDowell DT (NF-Inj.); 41 Dewey McDonald OLB (IR); 70 Rees Odhiambo T (IR); 22 C. J. Prosise RB (IR); 25 Richard Sherman CB (IR); -- Tyrus Thompson T (IR); Rookies in italics 53 active, 17 reserve, 9 practice squad

== Preseason ==
Week	Date	Opponent	Result	Record	Venue	Recap
1	August 13	at Los Angeles Chargers	W 48–17	1–0	StubHub Center	Recap
2	August 18	Minnesota Vikings	W 20–13	2–0	CenturyLink Field	Recap
3	August 25	Kansas City Chiefs	W 26–13	3–0	CenturyLink Field	Recap
4	August 31	at Oakland Raiders	W 17–13	4–0	Oakland–Alameda County Coliseum	Recap

== Regular season ==
=== Schedule ===
Divisional matchups: the NFC West played the NFC East and the AFC South.

Week	Date	Opponent	Result	Record	Venue	Recap
1	September 10	at Green Bay Packers	**L** 9–17	0–1	Lambeau Field	Recap
2	September 17	**San Francisco 49ers**	**W** 12–9	1–1	CenturyLink Field	Recap
3	September 24	at Tennessee Titans	**L** 27–33	1–2	Nissan Stadium	Recap
4	October 1	Indianapolis Colts	**W** 46–18	2–2	CenturyLink Field	Recap
5	October 8	at **Los Angeles Rams**	**W** 16–10	3–2	Los Angeles Memorial Coliseum	Recap
6	Bye					
7	October 22	at New York Giants	**W** 24–7	4–2	MetLife Stadium	Recap
8	October 29	Houston Texans	**W** 41–38	5–2	CenturyLink Field	Recap
9	November 5	Washington Redskins	**L** 14–17	5–3	CenturyLink Field	Recap
10	November 9	at **Arizona Cardinals**	**W** 22–16	6–3	University of Phoenix Stadium	Recap
11	November 20	Atlanta Falcons	**L** 31–34	6–4	CenturyLink Field	Recap
12	November 26	at **San Francisco 49ers**	**W** 24–13	7–4	Levi's Stadium	Recap
13	December 3	Philadelphia Eagles	**W** 24–10	8–4	CenturyLink Field	Recap
14	December 10	at Jacksonville Jaguars	**L** 24–30	8–5	EverBank Field	Recap
15	December 17	**Los Angeles Rams**	**L** 7–42	8–6	CenturyLink Field	Recap
16	December 24	at Dallas Cowboys	**W** 21–12	9–6	AT&T Stadium	Recap
17	December 31	**Arizona Cardinals**	**L** 24–26	9–7	CenturyLink Field	Recap

Note: Intra-division opponents are in bold text.

=== Game summaries ===
==== Week 1: at Green Bay Packers ====
Week One: Seattle Seahawks at Green Bay Packers – Game summary

Quarter	1	2	3	4	Total
Seahawks	0	3	3	3	**9**
**Packers**	0	0	14	3	**17**

at Lambeau Field, Green Bay, Wisconsin

- Date: September 10
- Game time: 3:25 p.m. CDT/1:25 p.m. PDT
- Game weather: 71 °F (22 °C), mostly sunny
- Game attendance: 78,381
- Referee: John Parry
- TV announcers (Fox): Joe Buck, Troy Aikman and Erin Andrews
- Recap, Gamebook

Game information

**First quarter**

- No scoring plays.

**Second quarter**

- SEA – Blair Walsh 33-yard field goal, 0:04. Seahawks 3–0. **Drive: 8 plays, 74 yards, 0:55.**

**Third quarter**

- GB – Ty Montgomery 6-yard run (Mason Crosby kick), 10:39. Packers 7–3. **Drive: 1 play, 6 yards, 0:06.**
- SEA – Blair Walsh 21-yard field goal, 4:23. Packers 7–6. **Drive: 11 plays, 71 yards, 6:13.**
- GB – Jordy Nelson 32-yard pass from Aaron Rodgers (Mason Crosby kick), 0:22. Packers 14–6. **Drive: 9 plays, 75 yards, 4:03.**

**Fourth quarter**

- GB – Mason Crosby 40-yard field goal, 8:05. Packers 17–6. **Drive: 12 plays, 53 yards, 5:37.**
- SEA – Blair Walsh 41-yard field goal, 6:21. Packers 17–9. **Drive: 7 plays, 52 yards, 1:44.**

**Top passers**

- SEA – Russell Wilson – 14/27, 158 yards
- GB – Aaron Rodgers – 28/42, 311 yards, TD, INT

**Top rushers**

- SEA – Russell Wilson – 2 rushes, 40 yards
- GB – Ty Montgomery – 19 rushes, 54 yards, TD

**Top receivers**

- SEA – Doug Baldwin – 4 receptions, 63 yards
- GB – Randall Cobb – 9 receptions, 85 yards

**Top tacklers**

- SEA – Earl Thomas – 7 solo tackles, 4 assisted
- GB – Quinten Rollins – 4 solo tackles, 4 assisted

==== Week 2: vs. San Francisco 49ers ====
Week Two: San Francisco 49ers at Seattle Seahawks – Game summary

Quarter	1	2	3	4	Total
49ers	0	6	0	3	**9**
**Seahawks**	6	0	0	6	**12**

at CenturyLink Field, Seattle, Washington

- Date: September 17
- Game time: 1:25 p.m. PDT
- Game weather: 65 °F (18 °C), mostly cloudy
- Game attendance: 68,729
- Referee: Bill Vinovich
- TV announcers (Fox): Sam Rosen, David Diehl and Jennifer Hale
- Recap, Gamebook

Game information

**First quarter**

- SEA – Blair Walsh 25-yard field goal, 8:38. Seahawks 3–0. **Drive: 16 plays, 68 yards, 6:22.**
- SEA – Blair Walsh 27-yard field goal, 0:49. Seahawks 6–0. **Drive: 10 plays, 27 yards, 4:42.**

**Second quarter**

- SF – Robbie Gould 40-yard field goal, 1:55. Seahawks 6–3. **Drive: 6 plays, 67 yards, 2:37.**
- SF – Robbie Gould 37-yard field goal, 0:17. Tied 6–6. **Drive: 7 plays, 49 yards, 0:39.**

**Third quarter**

- No scoring plays.

**Fourth quarter**

- SF – Robbie Gould 34-yard field goal, 11:36. 49ers 9–6. **Drive: 10 plays, 54 yards, 3:58.**
- SEA – Paul Richardson 9-yard pass from Russell Wilson (kick failed, hit right upright), 7:06. Seahawks 12–9. **Drive: 10 plays, 82 yards, 4:30.**

**Top passers**

- SF – Brian Hoyer – 15/27, 99 yards, INT
- SEA – Russell Wilson – 23/39, 198 yards, TD

**Top rushers**

- SF – Carlos Hyde – 15 rushes, 124 yards
- SEA – Chris Carson – 20 rushes, 93 yards

**Top receivers**

- SF – Marquise Goodwin – 3 receptions, 26 yards
- SEA – Tyler Lockett – 6 receptions, 64 yards

**Top tacklers**

- SF – NaVorro Bowman – 7 solo tackles, 4 assisted
- SEA – K. J. Wright – 5 solo tackles, 3 assisted

==== Week 3: at Tennessee Titans ====
Week Three: Seattle Seahawks at Tennessee Titans – Game summary

Quarter	1	2	3	4	Total
Seahawks	0	7	7	13	**27**
**Titans**	0	9	21	3	**33**

at Nissan Stadium, Nashville, Tennessee

- Date: September 24
- Game time: 3:05 p.m. CDT/1:05 p.m. PDT
- Game weather: 88 °F (31 °C), sunny
- Game attendance: 69,127
- Referee: Ronald Torbert
- TV announcers (Fox): Kevin Burkhardt, Charles Davis and Pam Oliver
- Recap, Gamebook

Game information

**First quarter**

- No scoring plays

**Second quarter**

- TEN – Ryan Succop 24-yard field goal, 13:23. Titans 3–0. **Drive: 11 plays, 61 yards, 5:20.**
- TEN – Ryan Succop 37-yard field goal, 5:51. Titans 6–0. **Drive: 12 plays, 49 yards, 6:30.**
- SEA – Doug Baldwin 4-yard pass from Russell Wilson (Blair Walsh kick), 1:15. Seahawks 7–6. **Drive: 5 plays, 86 yards, 0:49.**
- TEN – Ryan Succop 47-yard field goal, 0:00. Titans 9–7. **Drive: 8 plays, 47 yards, 1:15.**

**Third quarter**

- SEA – Chris Carson 10-yard pass from Russell Wilson (Blair Walsh kick), 10:09. Seahawks 14–9. **Drive: 9 plays, 75 yards, 4:51.**
- TEN – Rishard Matthews 55-yard pass from Marcus Mariota (Ryan Succop kick), 7:34. Titans 16–14. **Drive: 4 plays, 75 yards, 2:35.**
- TEN – Jonnu Smith 24-yard pass from Marcus Mariota (Ryan Succop kick), 3:50. Titans 23–14. **Drive: 5 plays, 54 yards, 2:40.**
- TEN – DeMarco Murray 75-yard run (Ryan Succop kick), 1:34. Titans 30–14. **Drive: 1 plays, 75 yards, 0:15.**

**Fourth quarter**

- SEA – Luke Willson 27-yard pass from Russell Wilson (pass failed), 13:59. Titans 30–20. **Drive: 8 plays, 75 yards, 2:35.**
- TEN – Ryan Succop 35-yard field goal, 10:00. Titans 33–20. **Drive: 8 plays, 58 yards, 3:59.**
- SEA – Paul Richardson 8-yard pass from Russell Wilson (Blair Walsh kick), 1:50. Titans 33–27. **Drive: 12 plays, 72 yards, 3:19.**

**Top passers**

- SEA – Russell Wilson – 29/49, 373 yards, 4 TD
- TEN – Marcus Mariota – 20/32, 225 yards, 2 TD

**Top rushers**

- SEA – Chris Carson – 11 rushes, 34 yards
- TEN – DeMarco Murray – 14 rushes, 115 yards, TD

**Top receivers**

- SEA – Doug Baldwin – 10 receptions, 105 yards, TD
- TEN – Rishard Matthews – 6 receptions, 87 yards, TD

**Top tacklers**

- SEA – Bobby Wagner – 8 solo tackles, 3 assisted
- TEN – Wesley Woodyard – 8 solo tackles, 2 assisted

==== Week 4: vs. Indianapolis Colts ====
Week Four: Indianapolis Colts at Seattle Seahawks – Game summary

Quarter	1	2	3	4	Total
Colts	2	13	3	0	**18**
**Seahawks**	3	7	22	14	**46**

at CenturyLink Field, Seattle, Washington

- Date: October 1
- Game time: 5:30 p.m. PDT
- Game weather: 61 °F (16 °C), clear
- Game attendance: 68,872
- Referee: Brad Allen
- TV announcers (NBC): Al Michaels, Cris Collinsworth and Michele Tafoya
- Recap, Gamebook

Game information

**First quarter**

- SEA – Blair Walsh 44-yard field goal, 8:59. Seahawks 3–0. **Drive: 7 plays, 38 yards, 3:04.**
- IND – Russell Wilson sacked by Nate Hairston in the end zone for a safety, 3:33. Seahawks 3–2.

**Second quarter**

- SEA – Justin Coleman 28-yard interception return (Blair Walsh kick), 12:25. Seahawks 10–2.
- IND – Robert Turbin 1-yard run (pass failed), 5:25. Seahawks 10–8. **Drive: 12 plays, 80 yards, 7:00.**
- IND – Donte Moncrief 18-yard pass from Jacoby Brissett (Adam Vinatieri kick), 0:25. Colts 15–10. **Drive: 9 plays, 55 yards, 3:09.**

**Third quarter**

- SEA – Russell Wilson 23-yard run (Russell Wilson–Doug Baldwin pass), 9:23. Seahawks 18–15. **Drive: 9 plays, 84 yards, 5:37.**
- IND – Adam Vinatieri 40-yard field goal, 4:53. Tied 18–18. **Drive: 4 plays, 2 yards, 0:56.**
- SEA – J. D. McKissic 30-yard run (Blair Walsh kick), 2:12. Seahawks 25–18. **Drive: 6 plays, 75 yards, 2:41.**
- SEA – Bobby Wagner 21-yard fumble return (Blair Walsh kick), 1:59. Seahawks 32–18.

**Fourth quarter**

- SEA – Luke Willson 6-yard pass from Russell Wilson (Blair Walsh kick), 11:16. Seahawks 39–18. **Drive: 9 plays, 74 yards, 4:46.**
- SEA – J. D. McKissic 27-yard pass from Russell Wilson (Blair Walsh kick), 2:22. Seahawks 46–18. **Drive: 11 plays, 84 yards, 6:56.**

**Top passers**

- IND – Jacoby Brissett – 16/29, 157 yards, TD, INT
- SEA – Russell Wilson – 21/26, 295 yards, 2 TD, 2 INT

**Top rushers**

- IND – Frank Gore – 12 rushes, 46 yards
- SEA – Eddie Lacy – 11 rushes, 52 yards

**Top receivers**

- IND – Frank Gore – 3 receptions, 34 yards
- SEA – Tyler Lockett – 4 receptions, 67 yards

**Top tacklers**

- IND – Jon Bostic – 5 solo tackles, 7 assisted
- SEA – Earl Thomas – 4 solo tackles, 3 assisted

This would be the final game in Seattle for defensive end Cliff Avril, who would suffer a neck injury and be released after a failed physical in the offseason.

==== Week 5: at Los Angeles Rams ====
Week Five: Seattle Seahawks at Los Angeles Rams – Game summary

Quarter	1	2	3	4	Total
**Seahawks**	0	10	3	3	**16**
Rams	0	10	0	0	**10**

at Los Angeles Memorial Coliseum, Los Angeles, California

- Date: October 8
- Game time: 1:05 p.m. PDT
- Game weather: 78 °F (26 °C), sunny
- Game attendance: 60,745
- Referee: Gene Steratore
- TV announcers (CBS): Spero Dedes and Adam Archuleta
- Recap, Gamebook

Game information

**First quarter**

- No scoring plays

**Second quarter**

- LAR – Tavon Austin 27-yard run (Greg Zuerlein kick), 14:13. Rams 7–0. **Drive: 10 plays, 79 yards, 3:57.**
- LAR – Greg Zuerlein 35-yard field goal, 9:29. Rams 10–0. **Drive: 4 plays, 2 yards, 0:56.**
- SEA – Jimmy Graham 4-yard pass from Russell Wilson (Blair Walsh kick), 1:55. Rams 10–7. **Drive: 15 plays, 75 yards, 7:34.**
- SEA – Blair Walsh 48-yard field goal, 0:00. Tied 10–10. **Drive: 9 plays, 46 yards, 1:28.**

**Third quarter**

- SEA – Blair Walsh 49-yard field goal, 5:41. Seahawks 13–10. **Drive: 9 plays, 43 yards, 4:13.**

**Fourth quarter**

- SEA – Blair Walsh 35-yard field goal, 1:09. Seahawks 16–10. **Drive: 4 plays, 3 yards, 1:37.**

**Top passers**

- SEA – Russell Wilson – 24/37, 198 yards, TD, INT
- LAR – Jared Goff – 22/47, 288 yards, 2 INT

**Top rushers**

- SEA – Thomas Rawls – 8 rushes, 20 yards
- LAR – Todd Gurley – 14 rushes, 43 yards

**Top receivers**

- SEA – Jimmy Graham – 6 receptions, 37 yards, TD
- LAR – Tyler Higbee – 4 receptions, 98 yards

**Top tacklers**

- SEA – Bobby Wagner – 8 solo tackles, 3 assisted
- LAR – Mark Barron – 12 solo tackles, 3 assisted

==== Week 7: at New York Giants ====
Week Seven: Seattle Seahawks at New York Giants – Game summary

Quarter	1	2	3	4	Total
**Seahawks**	0	3	7	14	**24**
Giants	0	7	0	0	**7**

at MetLife Stadium, East Rutherford, New Jersey

- Date: October 22
- Game time: 4:25 p.m. EDT/1:25 p.m. PDT
- Game weather: 75 °F (24 °C), partly cloudy
- Game attendance: 78,527
- Referee: Tony Corrente
- TV announcers (CBS): Andrew Catalon and James Lofton
- Recap, Gamebook

Game information

**First quarter**

- No scoring plays

**Second quarter**

- NYG – Evan Engram 5-yard pass from Eli Manning (Aldrick Rosas kick), 11:51. Giants 7–0. **Drive: 2 plays, 17 yards, 0:42.**
- SEA – Blair Walsh 39-yard field goal, 0:42. Giants 7–3. **Drive: 8 plays, 49 yards, 1:57.**

**Third quarter**

- SEA – Doug Baldwin 22-yard pass from Russell Wilson (Blair Walsh kick), 7:30. Seahawks 10–7. **Drive: 4 plays, 59 yards, 1:17.**

**Fourth quarter**

- SEA – Paul Richardson 38-yard pass from Russell Wilson (Blair Walsh kick), 9:34. Seahawks 17–7. **Drive: 1 play, 38 yards, 0:15.**
- SEA – Jimmy Graham 1-yard pass from Russell Wilson (Blair Walsh kick), 2:14. Seahawks 24–7. **Drive: 12 plays, 50 yards, 5:56.**

**Top passers**

- SEA – Russell Wilson – 27/39, 334 yards, 3 TD
- NYG – Eli Manning – 19/39, 134 yards, TD

**Top rushers**

- SEA – Thomas Rawls – 11 rushes, 36 yards
- NYG – Orleans Darkwa – 9 rushes, 35 yards

**Top receivers**

- SEA – Doug Baldwin – 9 receptions, 92 yards, TD
- NYG – Evan Engram – 6 receptions, 60 yards, TD

**Top tacklers**

- SEA – K. J. Wright – 6 solo tackles, 5 assisted
- NYG – Keenan Robinson – 6 solo tackles, 3 assisted

==== Week 8: vs. Houston Texans ====
Week Eight: Houston Texans at Seattle Seahawks – Game summary

Quarter	1	2	3	4	Total
Texans	14	7	3	14	**38**
**Seahawks**	14	7	6	14	**41**

at CenturyLink Field, Seattle, Washington

- Date: October 29
- Game time: 1:05 p.m. PDT
- Game weather: 56 °F (13 °C), cloudy
- Game attendance: 69,025
- Referee: Terry McAulay
- TV announcers (CBS): Kevin Harlan, Rich Gannon and Dana Jacobson
- Recap, Gamebook

Game information

**First quarter**

- HOU – Will Fuller V 59-yard pass from Deshaun Watson (Kaʻimi Fairbairn kick), 12:38. Texans 7–0. **Drive: 5 plays, 75 yards, 2:22.**
- SEA – Earl Thomas 78-yard interception return (Blair Walsh kick), 10:08. Tied 7–7.
- HOU – Lamar Miller 3-yard run (Kaʻimi Fairbairn kick), 6:08. Texans 14–7. **Drive: 8 plays, 82 yards, 4:00.**
- SEA – Paul Richardson 20-yard pass from Russell Wilson (Blair Walsh kick), 2:11. Tied 14–14. **Drive: 8 plays, 75 yards, 3:57.**

**Second quarter**

- HOU – Will Fuller V 20-yard pass from Deshaun Watson (Kaʻimi Fairbairn kick), 9:34. Texans 21–14. **Drive: 11 plays, 84 yards, 5:06.**
- SEA – Paul Richardson 7-yard pass from Russell Wilson (Blair Walsh kick), 6:02. Tied 21–21. **Drive: 6 plays, 75 yards, 3:32.**

**Third quarter**

- HOU – Kaʻimi Fairbairn 31-yard field goal, 7:05. Texans 24–21. **Drive: 10 plays, 63 yards, 4:19.**
- SEA – Blair Walsh 21-yard field goal, 4:36. Tied 24–24. **Drive: 6 plays, 75 yards, 2:29.**
- SEA – Blair Walsh 21-yard field goal, 2:24. Seahawks 27–24. **Drive: 5 plays, 5 yards, 1:21.**

**Fourth quarter**

- HOU – Lamar Miller 2-yard pass from Deshaun Watson (Kaʻimi Fairbairn kick), 9:09. Texans 31–27. **Drive: 5 plays, 71 yards, 2:16.**
- SEA – Jimmy Graham 1-yard pass from Russell Wilson (Blair Walsh kick), 6:02. Seahawks 34–31. **Drive: 7 plays, 75 yards, 3:32.**
- HOU – DeAndre Hopkins 72-yard pass from Deshaun Watson (Kaʻimi Fairbairn kick), 4:49. Texans 38–34. **Drive: 2 plays, 75 yards, 0:48.**
- SEA – Jimmy Graham 18-yard pass from Russell Wilson (Blair Walsh kick), 0:21. Seahawks 41–38. **Drive: 3 plays, 80 yards, 1:18.**

**Top passers**

- HOU – Deshaun Watson – 19/30, 402 yards, 4 TD, 3 INT
- SEA – Russell Wilson – 26/41, 452 yards, 4 TD, INT

**Top rushers**

- HOU – Deshaun Watson – 8 rushes, 67 yards
- SEA – Russell Wilson – 4 rushes, 30 yards

**Top receivers**

- HOU – DeAndre Hopkins – 8 receptions, 224 yards, TD
- SEA – Tyler Lockett – 6 receptions, 121 yards

**Top tacklers**

- HOU – D. J. Reader – 2 solo tackles, 4 assisted
- SEA – K. J. Wright – 9 solo tackles, 6 assisted

==== Week 9: vs. Washington Redskins ====
Week Nine: Washington Redskins at Seattle Seahawks – Game summary

Quarter	1	2	3	4	Total
**Redskins**	0	7	3	7	**17**
Seahawks	2	0	0	12	**14**

at CenturyLink Field, Seattle, Washington

- Date: November 5
- Game time: 1:05 p.m. PST
- Game weather: 36 °F (2 °C), rain
- Game attendance: 68,927
- Referee: Ronald Torbert
- TV announcers (Fox): Kevin Burkhardt, Charles Davis and Pam Oliver
- Recap, Gamebook

Game information

**First quarter**

- SEA – Kirk Cousins sacked by Bobby Wagner in the end zone for a safety, 6:48. Seahawks 2–0.

**Second quarter**

- WAS – Robert Kelley 1-yard run (Nick Rose kick), 2:52. Redskins 7–2. **Drive: 13 plays, 71 yards, 6:45.**

**Third quarter**

- WAS – Nick Rose 28-yard field goal, 10:19. Redskins 10–2. **Drive: 7 plays, 57 yards, 3:07.**

**Fourth quarter**

- SEA – Luke Willson 10-yard pass from Russell Wilson (pass failed), 11:48. Redskins 10–8. **Drive: 6 plays, 66 yards, 2:54.**
- SEA – Doug Baldwin 30-yard pass from Russell Wilson (pass failed), 1:34. Seahawks 14–10. **Drive: 5 plays, 71 yards, 0:48.**
- WAS – Robert Kelley 1-yard run (Nick Rose kick), 0:59. Redskins 17–14. **Drive: 4 plays, 70 yards, 0:35.**

**Top passers**

- WAS – Kirk Cousins – 21/31, 247 yards
- SEA – Russell Wilson – 24/45, 297 yards, 2 TD, 2 INT

**Top rushers**

- WAS – Chris Thompson – 4 rushes, 20 yards
- SEA – Russell Wilson – 10 rushes, 77 yards

**Top receivers**

- WAS – Vernon Davis – 6 receptions, 72 yards
- SEA – Doug Baldwin – 7 receptions, 108 yards, TD

**Top tacklers**

- WAS – Zach Brown – 8 solo tackles, 3 assisted, sack
- SEA – Bobby Wagner – 10 solo tackles, 2 assisted, sack, safety

==== Week 10: at Arizona Cardinals ====
Week Ten: Seattle Seahawks at Arizona Cardinals – Game summary

Quarter	1	2	3	4	Total
**Seahawks**	7	8	0	7	**22**
Cardinals	0	7	3	6	**16**

at University of Phoenix Stadium, Glendale, Arizona

- Date: November 9
- Game time: 6:30 p.m. MST/5:30 p.m. PST
- Game weather: 79 °F (26 °C), clear – retractable roof open
- Game attendance: 64,639
- Referee: Walt Anderson
- TV announcers (NBC/NFLN/Amazon Video): Mike Tirico, Cris Collinsworth and Heather Cox
- Recap, Gamebook

Game information

**First quarter**

- SEA – Jimmy Graham 6-yard pass from Russell Wilson (Blair Walsh kick), 5:07. Seahawks 7–0. **Drive: 9 plays, 51 yards, 4:00.**

**Second quarter**

- ARI – Jermaine Gresham 14-yard pass from Drew Stanton (Phil Dawson kick), 14:53. Tied 7–7. **Drive: 9 plays, 75 yards, 5:14.**
- SEA – Adrian Peterson tackled by Kam Chancellor in the end zone for a safety, 10:53. Seahawks 9–7.
- SEA – Blair Walsh 33-yard field goal, 10:19. Seahawks 12–7. **Drive: 11 plays, 76 yards, 5:45.**
- SEA – Blair Walsh 43-yard field goal, 10:19. Seahawks 15–7. **Drive: 5 plays, 37 yards, 0:44.**

**Third quarter**

- ARI – Phil Dawson 43-yard field goal, 10:19. Seahawks 15–10. **Drive: 11 plays, 51 yards, 6:28.**

**Fourth quarter**

- SEA – Jimmy Graham 2-yard pass from Russell Wilson (Blair Walsh kick), 12:49. Seahawks 22–10. **Drive: 7 plays, 80 yards, 3:54.**
- ARI – Andre Ellington 1-yard run (kick blocked), 0:20. Seahawks 22–16. **Drive: 11 plays, 61 yards, 2:08.**

**Top passers**

- SEA – Russell Wilson – 22/32, 238 yards, 2 TD
- ARI – Drew Stanton – 24/47, 273 yards, TD

**Top rushers**

- SEA – Thomas Rawls – 10 rushes, 27 yards
- ARI – Adrian Peterson – 21 rushes, 29 yards

**Top receivers**

- SEA – Doug Baldwin – 5 receptions, 95 yards
- ARI – Larry Fitzgerald – 10 receptions, 113 yards

**Top tacklers**

- SEA – Bobby Wagner – 9 solo tackles, 3 assisted
- ARI – Budda Baker – 6 solo tackles, 1 assisted

In what would be his last game in Seattle, Richard Sherman ruptured his Achilles tendon, effectively ending his season and the Legion of Boom era. Kam Chancellor would also play his final game as he suffered a neck injury and would later announce his retirement in the offseason.

==== Week 11: vs. Atlanta Falcons ====
Week Eleven: Atlanta Falcons at Seattle Seahawks – Game summary

Quarter	1	2	3	4	Total
**Falcons**	14	10	7	3	**34**
Seahawks	7	10	6	8	**31**

at CenturyLink Field, Seattle, Washington

- Date: November 20
- Game time: 5:30 p.m. PST
- Game weather: 45 °F (7 °C), cloudy
- Game attendance: 69,026
- Referee: Carl Cheffers
- TV announcers (ESPN): Sean McDonough, Jon Gruden and Lisa Salters
- Recap, Gamebook

Game information

**First quarter**

- ATL – Tevin Coleman 1-yard run (Matt Bryant kick), 11:59. Falcons 7–0. **Drive: 7 plays, 52 yards, 3:01.**
- ATL – Mohamed Sanu 2-yard pass from Matt Ryan (Matt Bryant kick), 7:52. Falcons 14–0. **Drive: 7 plays, 35 yards, 3:11.**
- SEA – Jimmy Graham 4-yard pass from Russell Wilson (Blair Walsh kick), 2:55. Falcons 14–7. **Drive: 9 plays, 65 yards, 4:57.**

**Second quarter**

- ATL – Adrian Clayborn 10-yard fumble return (Matt Bryant kick), . Falcons 21–7.
- SEA – Blair Walsh 30-yard field goal, 8:11. Falcons 21–10. **Drive: 11 plays, 49 yards, 5:53.**
- SEA – Russell Wilson 1-yard run (Blair Walsh kick), 5:21. Falcons 21–17. **Drive: 7 plays, 11 yards, 2:50.**
- ATL – Matt Bryant 44-yard field goal, 1:06. Falcons 24–17. **Drive: 9 plays, 45 yards, 4:15.**

**Third quarter**

- SEA – Blair Walsh 37-yard field goal, 11:21. Falcons 24–20. **Drive: 7 plays, 53 yards, 3:39.**
- ATL – Levine Toilolo 25-yard pass from Matt Ryan (Matt Bryant kick), 7:24. Falcons 31–20. **Drive: 8 plays, 76 yards, 3:57.**
- SEA – Blair Walsh 46-yard field goal, 1:40. Falcons 31–23. **Drive: 11 plays, 47 yards, 5:44.**

**Fourth quarter**

- ATL – Matt Bryant 19-yard field goal, 3:49. Falcons 34–23. **Drive: 9 plays, 61 yards, 5:08.**
- SEA – Doug Baldwin 29-yard pass from Russell Wilson (Russell Wilson-Jimmy Graham pass), 3:00. Falcons 34–31. **Drive: 5 plays, 75 yards, 0:49.**

**Top passers**

- ATL – Matt Ryan – 19/27, 195 yards, 2 TD
- SEA – Russell Wilson – 26/42, 258 yards, 2 TD, INT

**Top rushers**

- ATL – Tevin Coleman – 20 carries, 43 yards, TD
- SEA – Russell Wilson – 7 carries, 86 yards, TD

**Top receivers**

- ATL – Julio Jones – 5 receptions, 71 yards
- SEA – Jimmy Graham – 7 receptions, 58 yards, TD

**Top tacklers**

- ATL – Robert Alford – 7 solo tackles, 2 assisted
- SEA – Bobby Wagner – 6 solo tackles, 2 assisted

==== Week 12: at San Francisco 49ers ====
Week Twelve: Seattle Seahawks at San Francisco 49ers – Game summary

Quarter	1	2	3	4	Total
**Seahawks**	0	7	7	10	**24**
49ers	0	3	3	7	**13**

at Levi's Stadium, Santa Clara, California

- Date: November 26
- Game time: 1:05 p.m. PST
- Game weather: 66 °F (19 °C), cloudy
- Game attendance: 70,134
- Referee: Pete Morelli
- TV announcers (Fox): Kenny Albert, Ronde Barber and Kristina Pink
- Recap, Gamebook

Game information

**First quarter**

- No scoring plays.

**Second quarter**

- SEA – Russell Wilson 2-yard run (Blair Walsh kick), 13:28. Seahawks 7–0. **Drive: 2 plays, 16 yards, 0:38.**
- SF – Robbie Gould 38-yard field goal, 0:08. Seahawks 7–3. **Drive: 7 plays, 47 yards, 1:35.**

**Third quarter**

- SF – Robbie Gould 42-yard field goal, 9:24. Seahawks 7–6. **Drive: 10 plays, 51 yards, 5:41.**
- SEA – Nick Vannett 17-yard pass from Russell Wilson (Blair Walsh kick), 6:37. Seahawks 14–6. **Drive: 6 plays, 71 yards, 2:46.**

**Fourth quarter**

- SEA – Jimmy Graham 1-yard pass from Russell Wilson (Blair Walsh kick), 15:00. Seahawks 21–6. **Drive: 11 plays, 63 yards, 5:37.**
- SEA – Blair Walsh 34-yard field goal, 3:30. Seahawks 24–6. **Drive: 6 plays, 29 yards, 1:42.**
- SF – Louis Murphy 10-yard pass from Jimmy Garoppolo (Robbie Gould kick), 0:02. Seahawks 24–13. **Drive: 13 plays, 75 yards, 3:27.**

**Top passers**

- SEA – Russell Wilson – 20/34, 228 yards, 2 TD, INT
- SF – C. J. Beathard – 22/38, 201 yards, INT

**Top rushers**

- SEA – Eddie Lacy – 17 rushes, 46 yards
- SF – Carlos Hyde – 16 rushes, 47 yards

**Top receivers**

- SEA – Paul Richardson – 4 receptions, 70 yards
- SF – Marquise Goodwin – 4 receptions, 78 yards

**Top tacklers**

- SEA – Bradley McDougald – 7 solo tackles, 2 assisted
- SF – Eric Reid – 7 solo tackles, INT

==== Week 13: vs. Philadelphia Eagles ====
Week Thirteen: Philadelphia Eagles at Seattle Seahawks – Game summary

Quarter	1	2	3	4	Total
Eagles	0	3	0	7	**10**
**Seahawks**	10	0	7	7	**24**

at CenturyLink Field, Seattle, Washington

- Date: December 3
- Game time: 5:30 p.m. PST
- Game weather: 44 °F (7 °C), cloudy
- Game attendance: 69,075
- Referee: Tony Corrente
- TV announcers (NBC): Al Michaels, Cris Collinsworth and Michele Tafoya
- Recap, Gamebook

Game information

**First quarter**

- SEA – Blair Walsh 46-yard field goal, 9:47. Seahawks 3–0. **Drive: 12 plays, 53 yards, 5:13.**
- SEA – Jimmy Graham 11-yard pass from Russell Wilson (Blair Walsh kick), 0:10. Seahawks 10–0. **Drive: 5 plays, 85 yards, 2:48.**

**Second quarter**

- PHI – Jake Elliott 26-yard field goal, 7:51. Seahawks 10–3. **Drive: 16 plays, 75 yards, 7:19.**

**Third quarter**

- SEA – Tyler Lockett 1-yard pass from Russell Wilson (Blair Walsh kick), 5:42. Seahawks 17–3. **Drive: 11 plays, 80 yards, 3:57.**

**Fourth quarter**

- PHI – Nelson Agholor 27-yard pass from Carson Wentz (Jake Elliott kick), 12:08. Seahawks 17–10. **Drive: 7 plays, 81 yards, 3:48.**
- SEA – J. D. McKissic 15-yard pass from Russell Wilson (Blair Walsh kick), 7:29. Seahawks 24–10. **Drive: 10 plays, 73 yards, 4:39.**

**Top passers**

- PHI – Carson Wentz – 29/45, 348 yards, TD, INT
- SEA – Russell Wilson – 20/31, 227 yards, 3 TD

**Top rushers**

- PHI – Jay Ajayi – 9 rushes, 35 yards
- SEA – Mike Davis – 16 rushes, 64 yards

**Top receivers**

- PHI – Nelson Agholor – 7 receptions, 141 yards, TD
- SEA – Doug Baldwin – 5 receptions, 84 yards

**Top tacklers**

- PHI – Mychal Kendricks – 5 solo tackles, 4 assisted
- SEA – Bobby Wagner – 9 solo tackles, 4 assisted

==== Week 14: at Jacksonville Jaguars ====
Week Fourteen: Seattle Seahawks at Jacksonville Jaguars – Game summary

Quarter	1	2	3	4	Total
Seahawks	0	0	10	14	**24**
**Jaguars**	3	0	21	6	**30**

at EverBank Field, Jacksonville, Florida

- Date: December 10
- Game time: 4:25 p.m. EST/1:25 p.m. PST
- Game weather: 54 °F (12 °C), sunny
- Game attendance: 64,431
- Referee: Gene Steratore
- TV announcers (Fox): Chris Myers, Daryl Johnston and Laura Okmin
- Recap, Gamebook

Game information

**First quarter**

- JAX – Josh Lambo 38-yard field goal, 6:30. Jaguars 3–0. **Drive: 9 plays, 73 yards, 3:57.**

**Second quarter**

- No scoring plays

**Third quarter**

- JAX – Dede Westbrook 18-yard pass from Blake Bortles (Josh Lambo kick), 12:07. Jaguars 10–0. **Drive: 5 plays, 42 yards, 2:44.**
- SEA – Blair Walsh 28-yard field goal, 8:33. Jaguars 10–3. **Drive: 9 plays, 65 yards, 3:32**
- SEA – Doug Baldwin 26-yard pass from Russell Wilson (Blair Walsh kick), 7:38. Tied 10–10. **Drive: 2 plays, 25 yards, 0:51.**
- JAX – Keelan Cole 75-yard pass from Blake Bortles (Josh Lambo kick), 7:32. Jaguars 17–10. **Drive: 1 play, 75 yards, 0:11.**
- JAX – Leonard Fournette 1-yard run (Josh Lambo kick), 10:38. Jaguars 24–10. **Drive: 1 play, 1 yard, 0:03.**

**Fourth quarter**

- JAX – Josh Lambo 51-yard field goal, 10:07. Jaguars 27–10. **Drive: 13 plays, 65 yards, 7:31.**
- SEA – Paul Richardson 61-yard pass from Russell Wilson (Blair Walsh kick), 10:00. Jaguars 27–17. **Drive: 1 play, 61 yards, 0:16.**
- JAX – Josh Lambo 32-yard field goal, 4:09. Jaguars 30–17. **Drive: 9 plays, 54 yards, 9:43.**
- SEA – Tyler Lockett 74-yard pass from Russell Wilson (Blair Walsh kick), 3:52. Jaguars 30–24. **Drive: 2 plays, 79 yards, 0:23.**

**Top passers**

- SEA – Russell Wilson – 17/31, 271 yards, 3 TD, 3 INT
- JAX – Blake Bortles – 18/27, 268 yards, 2 TD

**Top rushers**

- SEA – Mike Davis – 15 carries, 66 yards
- JAX – Leonard Fournette – 24 carries, 101 yards, TD

**Top receivers**

- SEA – Paul Richardson – 3 receptions, 72 yards, TD
- JAX – Keelan Cole – 3 receptions, 99 yards, TD

**Top tacklers**

- SEA – Byron Maxwell – 9 tackles
- JAX – Aaron Colvin – 6 tackles

==== Week 15: vs. Los Angeles Rams ====
Week Fifteen: Los Angeles Rams at Seattle Seahawks – Game summary

Quarter	1	2	3	4	Total
**Rams**	13	21	6	2	**42**
Seahawks	0	0	7	0	**7**

at CenturyLink Field, Seattle, Washington

- Date: December 17
- Game time: 1:05 p.m. PST
- Game weather: 47 °F (8 °C), cloudy
- Game attendance: 69,077
- Referee: Ed Hochuli
- TV announcers (Fox): Kevin Burkhardt, Charles Davis and Pam Oliver
- Recap, Gamebook

Game information

**First quarter**

- LAR – Greg Zuerlein 36-yard field goal, 12:06. Rams 3–0. **Drive: 5 plays, 22 yards, 1:30.**
- LAR – Greg Zuerlein 31-yard field goal, 8:21. Rams 6–0. **Drive: 7 plays, 37 yards, 2:39.**
- LAR – Todd Gurley 1-yard run (Greg Zuerlein kick), 5:57. Rams 13–0. **Drive: 1 plays, 1 yards, 0:03.**

**Second quarter**

- LAR – Todd Gurley 1-yard run (Greg Zuerlein kick), 8:13. Rams 20–0. **Drive: 5 plays, 36 yards, 2:02.**
- LAR – Robert Woods 1-yard pass from Jared Goff (Greg Zuerlein kick), 3:26. Rams 27–0. **Drive: 7 plays, 39 yards, 4:01.**
- LAR – Todd Gurley 57-yard run (Greg Zuerlein kick), 0:28. Rams 34–0. **Drive: 3 plays, 47 yards, 0:51.**

**Third quarter**

- LAR – Todd Gurley 14-yard pass from Jared Goff (kick failed), 7:04. Rams 40–0. **Drive: 7 plays, 46 yards, 3:52.**
- SEA – Luke Wilson 26-yard pass from Russell Wilson (Blair Walsh kick), 1:23. Rams 40–7. **Drive: 7 plays, 77 yards, 1:48.**

**Fourth quarter**

- LAR – Penalty on Russell Wilson enfored in end zone for Safety, 10:14. Rams 42–7.

**Top passers**

- LAR – Jared Goff – 14/21, 120 yards, 2 TD, INT
- SEA – Russell Wilson – 14/30, 142 yards, TD

**Top rushers**

- LAR – Todd Gurley – 21 carries, 152 yards, 3 TD
- SEA – Russell Wilson – 5 carries, 39 yards

**Top receivers**

- LAR – Robert Woods – 6 receptions, 45 yards, TD
- SEA – J. D. McKissic – 3 receptions, 38 yards

**Top tacklers**

- LAR – Aaron Donald – 4 tackles, 1 assisted, 3 sacks
- SEA – Bradley McDougald – 7 tackles, 2 assisted

Seattle suffered their largest loss in the Pete Carroll era and their worst home loss since a 41–3 loss to the Jets in 1997.

==== Week 16: at Dallas Cowboys ====
Week Sixteen: Seattle Seahawks at Dallas Cowboys – Game summary

Quarter	1	2	3	4	Total
**Seahawks**	0	7	7	7	**21**
Cowboys	0	9	3	0	**12**

at AT&T Stadium, Arlington, Texas

- Date: December 24
- Game time: 3:25 p.m. CST/1:25 p.m. PST
- Game weather: Played indoors (retractable roof closed)
- Game attendance: 92,150
- Referee: John Hussey
- TV announcers (Fox): Joe Buck, Troy Aikman and Erin Andrews
- Recap, Gamebook

Game information

**First quarter**

- No scoring plays.

**Second quarter**

- DAL – Dan Bailey 34-yard field goal, 14:11. Cowboys 3–0. **Drive: 11 plays, 42 yards, 5:50.**
- DAL – Dan Bailey 51-yard field goal, 5:48. Cowboys 6–0. **Drive: 8 plays, 30 yards, 5:24.**
- SEA – Jimmy Graham 3-yard pass from Russell Wilson (Blair Walsh kick), 1:38. Seahawks 7–6. **Drive: 5 plays, 43 yards, 2:24.**
- DAL – Dan Bailey 51-yard field goal, 0:03. Cowboys 9–7. **Drive: 8 plays, 49 yards, 1:35.**

**Third quarter**

- SEA – Justin Coleman 30-yard interception return (Blair Walsh kick), 11:19. Seahawks 14–9.
- DAL – Dan Bailey 39-yard field goal, 8:36. Seahawks 14–12. **Drive: 5 plays, 44 yards, 2:43.**

**Fourth quarter**

- SEA – Doug Baldwin 6-yard pass from Russell Wilson (Blair Walsh kick), 11:59. Seahawks 21–12. **Drive: 13 plays, 79 yards, 6:25.**

**Top passers**

- SEA – Russell Wilson – 14/21, 93 yards, 2 TD
- DAL – Dak Prescott – 21/34, 182 yards, 2 INT

**Top rushers**

- SEA – Russell Wilson – 9 carries, 29 yards
- DAL – Ezekiel Elliott – 24 carries, 97 yards

**Top receivers**

- SEA – Doug Baldwin – 4 receptions, 35 yards, TD
- DAL – Dez Bryant – 3 receptions, 44 yards

**Top tacklers**

- SEA –
- DAL –

With the win, the Seahawks improved to 9–6 and eliminated the Cowboys from playoff contention.

==== Week 17: vs. Arizona Cardinals ====
Week Seventeen: Arizona Cardinals at Seattle Seahawks – Game summary

Quarter	1	2	3	4	Total
**Cardinals**	10	10	3	3	**26**
Seahawks	7	0	7	10	**24**

at CenturyLink Field, Seattle, Washington

- Date: December 31
- Game time: 1:25 p.m. PST
- Game weather: 40 °F (4 °C), sunny
- Game attendance: 69,078
- Referee: Walt Coleman
- TV announcers (Fox): Chris Myers, Daryl Johnston and Laura Okmin
- Recap, Gamebook

Game information

**First quarter**

- ARI – Jaron Brown 25-yard pass from Drew Stanton (Phil Dawson kick), 8:55. Cardinals 7–0. **Drive: 10 plays, 73 yards, 6:05.**
- SEA – Tyler Lockett 99-yard kickoff return (Blair Walsh kick), 8:43. Tied 7–7.
- ARI – Phil Dawson 49-yard field goal, 7:10. Cardinals 10–7. **Drive: 5 plays, 12 yards, 1:33.**

**Second quarter**

- ARI – Elijhaa Penny 4-yard run (Phil Dawson kick), 12:19. Cardinals 17–7. **Drive: 7 plays, 43 yards, 3:49.**
- ARI – Phil Dawson 46-yard field goal, 0:58. Cardinals 20–7. **Drive: 8 plays, 46 yards, 1:25.**

**Third quarter**

- SEA – Doug Baldwin 18-yard pass from Russell Wilson (Blair Walsh kick), 8:59. Cardinals 20–14. **Drive: 10 plays, 80 yards, 6:01.**
- ARI – Phil Dawson 53-yard field goal, 4:22. Cardinals 23–14. **Drive: 6 plays, 19 yards, 2:54.**

**Fourth quarter**

- SEA – Blair Walsh 49-yard field goal, 13:04. Cardinals 23–17. **Drive: 7 plays, 29 yards, 2:41.**
- SEA – Doug Baldwin 29-yard pass from Russell Wilson (Blair Walsh kick), 10:24. Seahawks 24–23. **Drive: 2 plays, 60 yards, 0:47.**
- ARI – Phil Dawson 42-yard field goal, 2:21. Cardinals 26–24. **Drive: 10 plays, 62 yards, 4:50.**

**Top passers**

- ARI – Drew Stanton – 15/34, 145 yards, TD, INT
- SEA – Russell Wilson – 18/29, 221 yards, 2 TD

**Top rushers**

- ARI – Kerwynn Williams – 23 carries, 75 yards
- SEA – Mike Davis – 10 carries, 48 yards

**Top receivers**

- ARI – Larry Fitzgerald – 8 receptions, 55 yards
- SEA – Doug Baldwin – 4 receptions, 90 yards, 2 TD

**Top tacklers**

- ARI –
- SEA –

With the loss, the Seahawks finished the season 9–7. This was the first season since 2011 the Seahawks failed to qualify for the playoffs. They also had a home record of 4–4, the worst of Russell Wilson's career. They would've still been eliminated even if they won, as the Falcons won their game.

This was also Bruce Arians' last game as head coach of the Arizona Cardinals.

=== Standings ===
==== Division ====
NFC West
	W	L	T	PCT	DIV	CONF	PF	PA	STK
^{(3)} Los Angeles Rams	11	5	0	.688	4–2	7–5	478	329	L1
Seattle Seahawks	9	7	0	.563	4–2	7–5	366	332	L1
Arizona Cardinals	8	8	0	.500	3–3	5–7	295	361	W2
San Francisco 49ers	6	10	0	.375	1–5	3–9	331	383	W5

==== Conference ====
NFC
#	Team	Division	W	L	T	PCT	DIV	CONF	SOS	SOV	STK
**Division leaders**
1 (Note: Philadelphia claimed the No. 1 seed over Minnesota based on winning percentage vs. common opponents. Philadelphia's cumulative record against Carolina, Chicago, the Los Angeles Rams and Washington was 5–0, compared to Minnesota's 4–1 cumulative record against the same four teams.)	Philadelphia Eagles	East	13	3	0	.813	5–1	10–2	.461	.433	L1
2	Minnesota Vikings	North	13	3	0	.813	5–1	10–2	.492	.447	W3
3 (Note: LA Rams claimed the No. 3 seed over New Orleans based on head-to-head victory.)	Los Angeles Rams	West	11	5	0	.688	4–2	7–5	.504	.460	L1
4 (Note: New Orleans clinched the NFC South division over Carolina based on head-to-head sweep.)	New Orleans Saints	South	11	5	0	.688	4–2	8–4	.535	.483	L1
**Wild Cards**
5	Carolina Panthers	South	11	5	0	.688	3–3	7–5	.539	.500	L1
6	Atlanta Falcons	South	10	6	0	.625	4–2	9–3	.543	.475	W1
**Did not qualify for the postseason**
7 (Note: Detroit finished ahead of Dallas and Seattle based on conference record, while Seattle finished ahead of Dallas based on head-to-head victory.)	Detroit Lions	North	9	7	0	.563	5–1	8–4	.496	.368	W1
8	Seattle Seahawks	West	9	7	0	.563	4–2	7–5	.492	.444	L1
9	Dallas Cowboys	East	9	7	0	.563	5–1	7–5	.496	.438	W1
10	Arizona Cardinals	West	8	8	0	.500	3–3	5–7	.488	.406	W2
11 (Note: Green Bay finished ahead of Washington based on record vs. common opponents. Green Bay's cumulative record against Dallas, Minnesota, New Orleans and Seattle was 2–3, compared to Washington's 1–4 cumulative record against the same four teams.)	Green Bay Packers	North	7	9	0	.438	2–4	5–7	.539	.357	L3
12	Washington Redskins	East	7	9	0	.438	1–5	5–7	.539	.429	L1
13	San Francisco 49ers	West	6	10	0	.375	1–5	3–9	.512	.438	W5
14 (Note: Tampa Bay finished ahead of Chicago based on head-to-head victory.)	Tampa Bay Buccaneers	South	5	11	0	.313	1–5	3–9	.555	.375	W1
15	Chicago Bears	North	5	11	0	.313	0–6	1–11	.559	.500	L1
16	New York Giants	East	3	13	0	.188	1–5	1–11	.531	.458	W1
**Tiebreakers** (Note: When breaking ties for three or more teams under the NFL's rules, they are first broken within divisions, then comparing only the highest-ranked remaining team from each division.)

== Team leaders ==
Category	Player(s)	Value
Passing yards	Russell Wilson	3,983
Passing touchdowns	Russell Wilson	34
Rushing yards	Russell Wilson	586
Rushing touchdowns	Russell Wilson	3
Receptions	Doug Baldwin	75
Receiving yards	Doug Baldwin	991
Receiving touchdowns	Jimmy Graham	10
Points	Blair Walsh	100
Kickoff return yards	Tyler Lockett	949
Punt return yards	Tyler Lockett	238
Tackles	Bobby Wagner	133
Sacks	Frank Clark	9
Forced fumbles	Frank Clark; Marcus Smith	2
Interceptions	Earl Thomas Richard Sherman Bobby Wagner Justin Coleman	2
