= George Fant =

George Fant may refer to:

- George Fant (actor)
- George Fant (American football)
