= Justin Coleman =

American football player (born 1993)

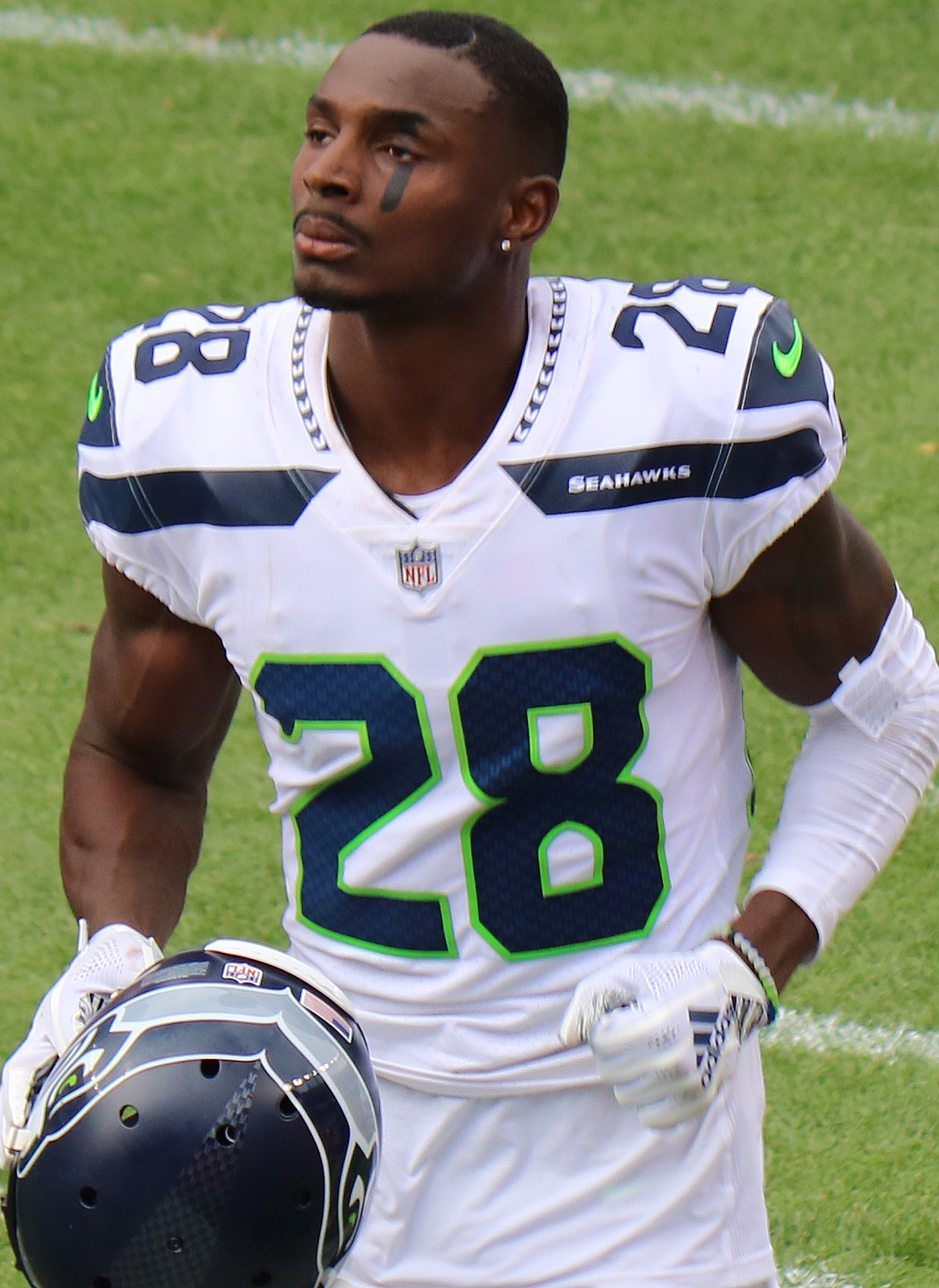
- Coleman with the Seattle Seahawks in 2018

No. 22, 28, 27
- Position: Cornerback/Nickelback

Personal information
- Born: March 27, 1993 (age 33); Columbus, Georgia, U.S.
- Listed height: 5 ft 11 in (1.80 m)
- Listed weight: 190 lb (86 kg)

Career information
- High school: Brunswick (Brunswick, Georgia)
- College: Tennessee
- NFL draft: 2015: undrafted

Career history
- Minnesota Vikings (2015)*; New England Patriots (2015)*; Seattle Seahawks (2015)*; New England Patriots (2015–2016); Seattle Seahawks (2017–2018); Detroit Lions (2019–2020); Miami Dolphins (2021); Seattle Seahawks (2022)
- * Offseason or practice squad member only

Awards and highlights
- Super Bowl champion (LI)

Career NFL statistics
- Total tackles: 248
- Sacks: 2.0
- Forced fumbles: 4
- Fumble recoveries: 4
- Pass deflections: 44
- Interceptions: 6
- Defensive touchdowns: 3
- Stats at Pro Football Reference

Justin Jamal Coleman (born March 27, 1993) is an American former professional football player who was a cornerback and nickelback in the National Football League (NFL). He played college football for the Tennessee Volunteers, and signed with the Minnesota Vikings as an undrafted free agent in 2015. He was also a member of the New England Patriots, Seattle Seahawks, Detroit Lions, and Miami Dolphins. Coleman won Super Bowl LI with the Patriots.

== Early life ==
Coleman attended Brunswick High School in Brunswick, Georgia, where he was a two-sport star in both football and track for the Pirates. As a sophomore in 2008, he tallied 71 tackles, four pass breakups, three sacks and intercepted two passes. As a junior in 2009, he totalled 83 tackles, six pass breakups, and six interceptions, and also returned a kickoff for touchdown. He helped lead the team to an undefeated district season as a senior in 2010. He was teammates with Ahmaud Arbery, Darius Slay, and Tracy Walker.

Also a standout in track & field, Coleman finished second in class 4-A at the state championships in the 300m hurdles (38.82s) and fifth in the 110m hurdles (14.61s) as a senior. He also competed as a sprinter at Brunswick, posting personal-best times of 11.04 seconds in the 100-meter dash, 22.67 seconds in the 200-meter dash and 52.34 seconds in the 400-meter dash.

Regarded as a four-star recruit by Rivals.com, Coleman was ranked the No. 17 overall cornerback in the nation and the No. 16 overall prospect in the state of Georgia. He was also named to the Rivals250 Team. He was rated as a three-star recruit by Scout.com, and was considered the No. 45 overall cornerback. ESPN.com ranked him the No. 30 overall safety.

== College career ==
Coleman enrolled in the University of Tennessee, where he played for the Tennessee Volunteers football team from 2011 to 2014. He was teammates with Atlanta Falcons wide receiver Cordarrelle Patterson in the 2012 season. As a true freshman, he played in all 12 games (starting four) at cornerback, and was 1-of-16 true freshmen to play for the Vols in 2011. As a sophomore, he started 9-of-12 games played, finishing fourth on the team with 59 tackles (3.5 for loss) and 3 passes defended. He finished his 2013 campaign with 46 tackles, 8 passes defended and an interception, which he returned for a score. As a senior in 2014, he tied for fourth in the Southeastern Conference (SEC) with four interceptions. Following the 2014 campaign, Coleman was invited to play in the East-West Shrine Game, where he made four tackles.

== Professional career ==
=== Pre-draft ===
On November 18, 2014, Coleman accepted his invitation to play in the 2015 East-West Shrine Game. On January 17, 2015, Coleman appeared in the East-West Shrine Game as part of Michael Singletary's East team. Coleman recorded four solo tackles and deflected a pass as the East routed the West was 19–3. Coleman attended the NFL Scouting Combine as the only player from Tennessee. He completed all of the combine drills and finished with the best time of all cornerbacks in the three-cone drill. Coleman also finished third, among all corners, in the 60-yard shuttle and bench press and had the fifth best time, among corners, in the short shuttle. Coleman performed at a private workout for the New England Patriots. Coleman was projected to be a fifth to seventh round pick in the 2015 NFL draft by NFL draft experts and scouts. He was ranked as the 28th best cornerback prospect available in the draft by DraftScout.com.

Pre-draft measurables
Height	Weight	Arm length	Hand span	Wingspan	40-yard dash	10-yard split	20-yard split	20-yard shuttle	Three-cone drill	Vertical jump	Broad jump	Bench press
5 ft 10 5/8 in (1.79 m)	185 lb (84 kg)	31 1/4 in (0.79 m)	9 3/8 in (0.24 m)	6 ft 3 3/8 in (1.91 m)	4.53 s	1.54 s	2.60 s	3.98 s	6.61 s	37.5 in (0.95 m)	10 ft 4 in (3.15 m)	20 reps
All values from NFL Combine

=== Minnesota Vikings ===
On May 3, 2015, the Minnesota Vikings signed Coleman to a three-year, $1.59 million contract as an undrafted free agent that included a signing bonus of $20,000. Throughout training camp, he competed for a roster spot as a backup cornerback against Josh Robinson, Jabari Price, DeMarcus Van Dyke, Marcus Sherels, and Jalil Carter. On August 30, 2015, the Vikings waived Coleman as part of their final roster cuts.

=== New England Patriots (first stint) ===
On September 4, 2015, the Patriots claimed Coleman off of waivers, but released him the following day.

=== Seattle Seahawks (first stint) ===
On September 6, 2015, the Seattle Seahawks signed Coleman to their practice squad. He had also received offers to join the Patriots and Vikings practice squads, but declined them and joined the Seahawks.

=== New England Patriots (second stint) ===
==== 2015 ====
On September 9, 2015, the Patriots signed Coleman to their active roster from the Seahawks' practice squad. Upon his arrival, Coleman was designated as the fifth cornerback in the Patriots' depth chart, behind Malcolm Butler, Tarell Brown, Logan Ryan, and Bradley Fletcher.

Coleman was inactive as a healthy scratch for the first two games (Weeks 1–2). On September 27, 2015, Coleman made his professional regular season debut and recorded three combined tackles during a 51–17 victory against the Jacksonville Jaguars in Week 3. Coleman was activated over Fletcher and an injury to Tarell Brown. Heading into Week 5, Coleman became the third cornerback on the depth chart after Tarell Brown and Fletcher were placed on injured reserve. On October 29, 2015, Coleman earned his first career start and collected a season-high five solo tackles and made one pass deflection during the Patriots' 36–7 victory against the Miami Dolphins in Week 8. In Week 10, Coleman made four combined tackles and a pass deflection before exiting the Patriots' 27–26 victory at the New York Giants after injuring his hand. Coleman remained inactive for the next three games (Weeks 11–13). Rashaan Melvin replaced Coleman during his absence. Coleman aggravated his hand injury and was subsequently sidelined for the Patriots' Week 17 loss at the Miami Dolphins. He finished his rookie season in 2015 with 21 combined tackles (17 solo), five pass deflections, and one fumble recovery in ten games and two starts.

The Patriots finished first in the AFC East with a 12–4 record and earned a first round bye. On January 16, 2016, Coleman appeared in his first career playoff game and recorded three solo tackles and made one pass deflection during a 27–20 victory against the Kansas City Chiefs in the AFC Divisional Round. The following week, he made four solo tackles and a pass deflection as the Patriots lost 20–18 at the Denver Broncos during the AFC Championship Game.

==== 2016 ====
On March 7, 2016, the Patriots offered Coleman a tender sheet as he became an exclusive-rights free agent. On April 13, 2016, Coleman signed a one-year, $525,000 exclusive-rights tender. Coleman entered training camp as a backup cornerback. He competed with Jonathan Jones, Brock Vereen, E. J. Biggers, Cre'Von LeBlanc, V'Angelo Bentley, and Darryl Roberts to be the fourth cornerback on the depth chart. Head coach Bill Belichick named Coleman the fourth cornerback to begin the season. He was listed behind Logan Ryan, Malcolm Butler, and Cyrus Jones.

External videos
- Justin Coleman recovers Paul Perkins' fumble

Coleman was inactive as a healthy scratch for two games (Weeks 5–6). In Week 7, Coleman collected a season-high two solo tackles and made one pass deflection during a 27–16 victory at the Pittsburgh Steelers. Coleman was inactive as a healthy scratch for three consecutive games (Weeks 11–13) and was also inactive for a Week 16 victory against the New York Jets. He was surpassed on the depth chart by Jonathan Jones and Eric Rowe. He finished the season with eight solo tackles and three pass deflections in ten games and one start.

The Patriots finished the 2016 NFL season with a 14–2 record and earned a first round bye. Unfortunately, Coleman was inactive as a healthy scratch as the Patriots season won three consecutive playoff games to reach Super Bowl LI. On February 5, 2017, the Patriots appeared in Super Bowl LI and defeated the Atlanta Falcons by a score of 34–28 in overtime.

==== 2017 ====
On March 7, 2017, the Patriots placed an exclusive-rights tender on Coleman. On March 17, 2017, Coleman signed his one-year, $615,000 exclusive-rights tender to remain with the Patriots. During training camp, Coleman competed Eric Rowe, Cyrus Jones, and Jonathan Jones to be the third cornerback on the Patriots' depth chart.

=== Seattle Seahawks (second stint) ===
==== 2017 ====
On September 1, 2017, the Seahawks traded their seventh round pick (250th overall) in the 2018 NFL draft to the Patriots in exchange for Coleman. Head coach Pete Carroll named Coleman the fifth cornerback on the Seahawks' depth chart to begin the regular season. He was listed behind Richard Sherman, Shaquill Griffin, Neiko Thorpe, and Jeremy Lane. Coleman was also named the first-team nickelback to start the season.

External videos
- Turning Point: Coleman crushes Dallas' playoff hopes
- Justin Coleman takes interception to the house

On October 1, 2017, Coleman made a tackle, a pass deflection, and returned his first career interception for a touchdown during the Seahawks' 46–18 victory against the Indianapolis Colts in Week 4. Coleman intercepted a pass by Colts' quarterback Jacoby Brissett, that was intended for wide receiver Kamar Aiken, and returned it 28-yards during the second quarter for his first career touchdown. In Week 8, he made one tackle and made his first career sack with defensive end Michael Bennett during a 41–38 win against the Houston Texans. Coleman's first sack was on Texans' quarterback Deshaun Watson for a six-yard loss in the third quarter. In Week 9, Coleman collected a season-high seven combined tackles and broke up a pass during the Seahawks' 17–14 loss against the Washington Redskins. On December 3, 2017, Coleman made three combined tackles and made the first solo sack of his career during a 24–10 victory against the Philadelphia Eagles in Week 13. He sacked Eagles' quarterback Carson Wentz for a six-yard loss at the end of the third quarter. On December 24, 2017, Coleman recorded three combined tackles, deflected a pass, and returned an interception by Dak Prescott for a 30-yard touchdown during the third quarter of a 21–12 win at the Dallas Cowboys in Week 16. Coleman finished the 2017 NFL season with 42 combined tackles (31 solo), nine pass deflections, two interceptions, 1.5 sacks, and two touchdowns in 16 games and five starts.

==== 2018 ====
External videos
- Coleman goes airborne to pick off pass from Stafford

On March 12, 2018, the Seahawks placed a second-round restricted free agent tender on Coleman. Coleman retained his role as the first-team nickelback and also began the season as the third cornerback on the depth chart, behind Griffin and Thorpe. On October 28, 2018, he made four combined tackles, broke up a pass attempt, and intercepted a pass by Lions' quarterback Matthew Stafford, that was intended for wide receiver Golden Tate, to seal the Seahawks' 28–14 victory at the Detroit Lions in Week 8. In Week 13, Coleman collected a career-high ten combined tackles (eight solo), deflected a pass, and was credited with half a sack during a 43–16 victory against the San Francisco 49ers. On December 10, 2018, Coleman made one tackle and returned a fumble recovery for a touchdown as the Seahawks defeated the Vikings 21–7 in Week 14. Coleman returned a fumble for a 29-yard touchdown during the fourth quarter after Jacob Martin stripped the ball during a sack on quarterback Kirk Cousins. He finished the season with 55 combined tackles (41 solo), ten pass deflections, one interception, one fumble recovery, one touchdown, and was credited with half a sack in 16 games and five starts.

=== Detroit Lions ===
On March 14, 2019, Coleman signed a four-year, $36 million contract with the Lions. In Week 6 against the Green Bay Packers, Coleman intercepted a pass from Aaron Rodgers that bounced off the hands of wide receiver Darrius Shepherd and returned it for 55 yards in the 23–22 loss.

Coleman was placed on the reserve/COVID-19 list by the Lions on July 30, 2020, and was activated from the list five days later. He was placed on injured reserve on September 15, 2020, with a hamstring injury. He was activated on October 31. Coleman played in 11 games and started five in the 2020 season. He finished with 30 total tackles (22 solo) and one pass defended.

Coleman was released by the Lions after the season on March 12, 2021.

=== Miami Dolphins ===
On March 18, 2021, Coleman signed a one-year contract with the Dolphins. In Week 10 against the Baltimore Ravens, Coleman intercepted Lamar Jackson's pass to seal the 22–10 win for the Dolphins. He played in 16 games and started four in the 2021 season. He finished with 27 total tackles (20 solo), two interceptions, and three passes defended.

=== Seattle Seahawks (third stint) ===
On March 23, 2022, Coleman signed a one-year contract with the Seahawks. He was released during final roster cuts on August 30, but re–signed with the team the following day. He played in 12 games in the 2022 season.

== NFL career statistics ==
Legend
	Led the league
**Bold**	Career high

=== Regular season ===
Year	Team	Games		Tackles					Interceptions					Fumbles			
Year	Team	GP	GS	Cmb	Solo	Ast	Sck	TFL	Int	Yds	TD	Lng	PD	FF	FR	Yds	TD
2015	NWE	10	2	21	17	4	0.0	1	0	0	0	0	5	0	1	0	0
2016	NWE	10	1	8	8	0	0.0	0	0	0	0	0	3	0	0	0	0
2017	SEA	**16**	5	43	32	11	**1.5**	1	**2**	**58**	**2**	30	9	0	0	0	0
2018	SEA	**16**	5	**55**	41	**14**	0.5	0	1	0	0	0	10	1	**2**	**29**	**1**
2019	DET	**16**	**11**	54	**47**	7	0.0	0	1	55	0	**55**	**13**	**3**	1	0	0
2020	DET	11	5	30	22	8	0.0	**3**	0	0	0	0	1	0	0	0	0
2021	MIA	**16**	4	27	20	7	0.0	1	**2**	0	0	0	3	0	0	0	0
2022	SEA	12	0	10	5	5	0.0	0	0	0	0	0	0	0	0	0	0
		107	33	248	192	56	2.0	6	6	113	2	55	44	4	4	29	1

=== Playoffs ===
Year	Team	Games		Tackles					Interceptions					Fumbles			
Year	Team	GP	GS	Cmb	Solo	Ast	Sck	TFL	Int	Yds	TD	Lng	PD	FF	FR	Yds	TD
2015	NWE	**2**	0	**7**	**7**	0	0.0	0	0	0	0	0	**2**	0	0	0	0
2018	SEA	1	0	6	5	**1**	0.0	0	0	0	0	0	0	0	0	0	0
2022	SEA	1	0	0	0	0	0.0	0	0	0	0	0	0	0	0	0	0
		4	0	13	12	1	0.0	0	0	0	0	0	2	0	0	0	0
