= Dewey McDonald =

American football player (born 1990)

No. 31, 35, 41
- Position: Linebacker

Personal information
- Born: June 10, 1990 (age 36); Ranson, West Virginia, U.S.
- Listed height: 6 ft 0 in (1.83 m)
- Listed weight: 229 lb (104 kg)

Career information
- High school: Jefferson (WV) High School
- College: California (PA); Fairmont State
- NFL draft: 2014: undrafted

Career history
- Indianapolis Colts (2014–2015); New England Patriots (2015); Oakland Raiders (2015); Seattle Seahawks (2016–2017)

Career NFL statistics
- Total tackles: 20
- Pass deflections: 1
- Stats at Pro Football Reference

Dewey Dupree McDonald (born June 10, 1990) is an American former professional football player who was a linebacker in the National Football League (NFL). He played college football for the California Vulcans, and signed with the Indianapolis Colts as an undrafted free agent following the 2014 NFL draft. He was also a member of the New England Patriots, Oakland Raiders, and Seattle Seahawks.

== Early life ==
McDonald was a three-time all-conference player, three-time all-area and two-time team MVP while playing at Jefferson High School in Shenandoah Junction, West Virginia. As a junior, he was named Defensive Player of the Year by The Journal. The newspaper also named him Male Field Athlete of the Year in his senior year, during which he was part of the high school's state championship in track and field.

== College career ==
McDonald transferred to the California University of Pennsylvania in 2012 after playing three seasons at Fairmont State University in Fairmont, West Virginia. After missing the 2012 season due to injury, he was a senior captain for the Vulcans in 2013. In his senior year, he recorded 89 tackles and returned all three of his interceptions for touchdowns. His three interception returns for touchdowns made him the first Pennsylvania State Athletic Conference player to accomplish the feat in over 10 years.

== Professional career ==
Pre-draft measurables
Height	Weight	Arm length	Hand span	40-yard dash	10-yard split	20-yard split	20-yard shuttle	Three-cone drill	Vertical jump	Broad jump	Bench press
5 ft 11 3/4 in (1.82 m)	220 lb (100 kg)	31 in (0.79 m)	8 7/8 in (0.23 m)	4.43 s	1.58 s	2.67 s	4.33 s	6.99 s	34.5 in (0.88 m)	9 ft 8 in (2.95 m)	23 reps
All values from Pro Day

=== Indianapolis Colts ===
McDonald signed with the Indianapolis Colts as an undrafted free agent after the 2014 NFL draft. After starting the 2014 season on the team's practice squad, he was signed to the active roster on September 29. He appeared in 12 games during his rookie season, recording 10 tackles, including 8 solo. He also appeared in three playoff games for the team that season, recording one tackle in each.

On September 5, 2015, McDonald was waived by the Colts. He was added to the practice squad the following day. He was elevated to the active roster on October 20. He appeared in one game and recorded one tackle.

On October 27, 2015, McDonald was waived by the Colts to make room on the active roster for Quan Bray.

=== New England Patriots ===
On October 28, 2015, McDonald was claimed off waivers by the New England Patriots. He played one game with the Patriots before being waived on November 12. He was signed to the team's practice squad on November 14, but was released four days later.

The Patriots signed McDonald to the active roster on November 26, 2015, after placing Aaron Dobson on injured reserve. On November 28, 2015, he was waived once more.

=== Oakland Raiders ===
On December 2, 2015, McDonald was signed to the Oakland Raiders practice squad. On December 29, he was elevated to the active roster for the team's final game of the season after fullback Marcel Reece was suspended.

=== Seattle Seahawks ===
On September 3, 2016, McDonald was traded to the Seattle Seahawks in exchange for a conditional pick in the 2017 NFL draft. The Seahawks converted McDonald from a safety to a linebacker. He played in 14 regular-season games in the 2016 season, recording 8 tackles (6 solo), along with two playoff games.

On September 27, 2017, McDonald was placed on injured reserve after suffering an ACL injury in Week 3.

== Career statistics ==
=== Regular season ===
Year	Team	G	GS	Tackles					Interceptions						Fumbles
Year	Team	G	GS	Comb	Total	Ast	Sck	SFTY	PDef	Int	Yds	Avg	Lng	TDs	FF
2014	Indianapolis Colts	12	0	10	8	2	0.0	0	0	0	0	–	0	0	0
2015	Indianapolis Colts	1	0	1	0	1	0.0	0	0	0	0	–	0	0	0
2015	New England Patriots	1	0	0	0	0	0.0	0	0	0	0	–	0	0	0
2015	Oakland Raiders	1	0	0	0	0	0.0	0	0	0	0	–	0	0	0
2016	Seattle Seahawks	14	0	8	6	2	0.0	0	1	0	0	–	0	0	0
2017	Seattle Seahawks	3	0	1	0	1	0.0	0	0	0	0	–	0	0	0
Total		32	0	20	14	6	0.0	0	1	0	0	–	0	0	0

=== Postseason ===
Year	Team	G	GS	Tackles					Interceptions						Fumbles
Year	Team	G	GS	Comb	Total	Ast	Sck	SFTY	PDef	Int	Yds	Avg	Lng	TDs	FF
2014	Indianapolis Colts	3	0	3	3	0	0.0	0	0	0	0	–	0	0	0
2016	Seattle Seahawks	2	0	0	0	0	0.0	0	0	0	0	–	0	0	0
Total		5	0	3	3	0	0.0	0	0	0	0	–	0	0	0

== Personal life ==
In 2015, McDonald started a foundation to help his youth Jefferson County, West Virginia. He started his own flag football league, called the Dewey League, and charity softball tournament.
