= Bradley Sowell =

American football player (born 1989)

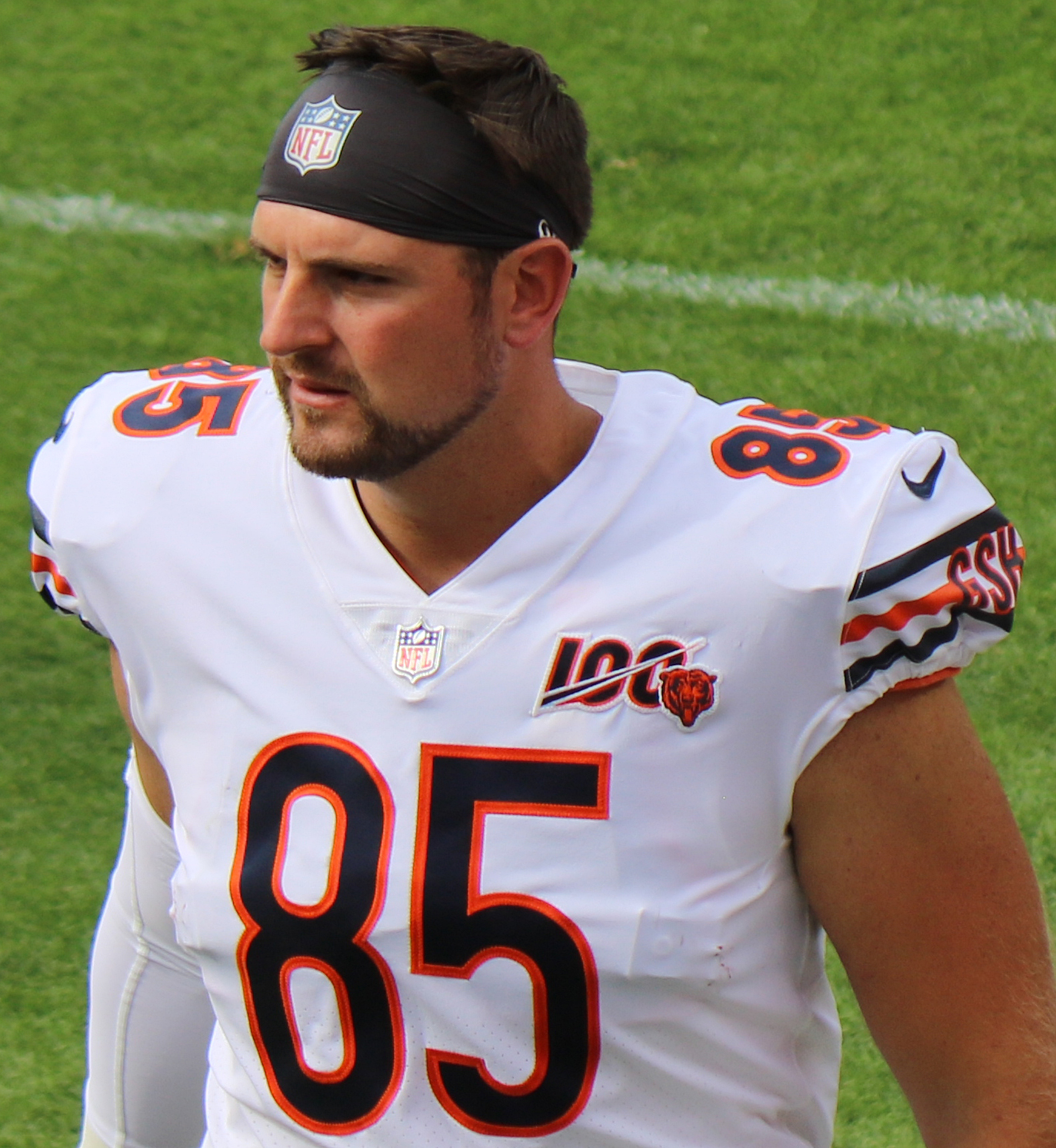
- Sowell with the Chicago Bears in 2019

No. 60, 79, 78, 85
- Positions: Tight end, offensive tackle

Personal information
- Born: June 6, 1989 (age 37); Hernando, Mississippi, U.S.
- Listed height: 6 ft 7 in (2.01 m)
- Listed weight: 277 lb (126 kg)

Career information
- High school: Hernando
- College: Ole Miss
- NFL draft: 2012: undrafted

Career history
- Tampa Bay Buccaneers (2012)*; Indianapolis Colts (2012); Arizona Cardinals (2013–2015); Seattle Seahawks (2016); Chicago Bears (2017–2019)
- * Offseason or practice squad member only

Awards and highlights
- Second-team All-SEC (2010)

Career NFL statistics
- Receptions: 1
- Receiving yards: 2
- Receiving touchdowns: 1
- Stats at Pro Football Reference

Bradley Keith Sowell (/ˈsaʊəl/; born June 6, 1989) is an American former professional football player who was a tight end and offensive tackle in the National Football League (NFL). He played college football for the Ole Miss Rebels. He signed with the Tampa Bay Buccaneers as an undrafted free agent in 2012, and later spent time with the Indianapolis Colts, Arizona Cardinals, Seattle Seahawks and Chicago Bears. He was born in Memphis, Tennessee and raised in nearby Hernando, Mississippi.

== College career ==
Sowell played offensive tackle for the University of Mississippi from 2007 to 2011. During his tenure, he was teammates with Bobby Massie who he would continue to play with during stops in Chicago and Arizona.

== Professional career ==
Pre-draft measurables
Height	Weight	Arm length	Hand span	40-yard dash	10-yard split	20-yard split	20-yard shuttle	Three-cone drill	Vertical jump	Broad jump	Bench press
6 ft 6 7/8 in (2.00 m)	309 lb (140 kg)	34 in (0.86 m)	10 in (0.25 m)	5.22 s	1.88 s	2.96 s	4.65 s	7.43 s	29.0 in (0.74 m)	8 ft 6 in (2.59 m)	21 reps
All values from Ole Miss' Pro Day

=== Tampa Bay Buccaneers ===
On April 30, 2012, Sowell was signed as an undrafted rookie for the Tampa Bay Buccaneers. The Buccaneers signed him to a three-year, $1.45 million contract. After originally making the 53-man roster, Sowell was waived on September 1, 2012, after the Bucs claimed three players off waivers. He was then signed to the team's practice squad.

=== Indianapolis Colts ===
On September 11, 2012, he was signed off of the Tampa Bay Buccaneer's practice squad to the Indianapolis Colts active roster. He began the season as the backup left tackle to Anthony Castonzo and made his professional debut on September 16, 2012, against the Minnesota Vikings. On August 31, 2013, he was waived by the Indianapolis Colts.

During his time with the Indianapolis Colts, he appeared in ten games for them.

=== Arizona Cardinals ===
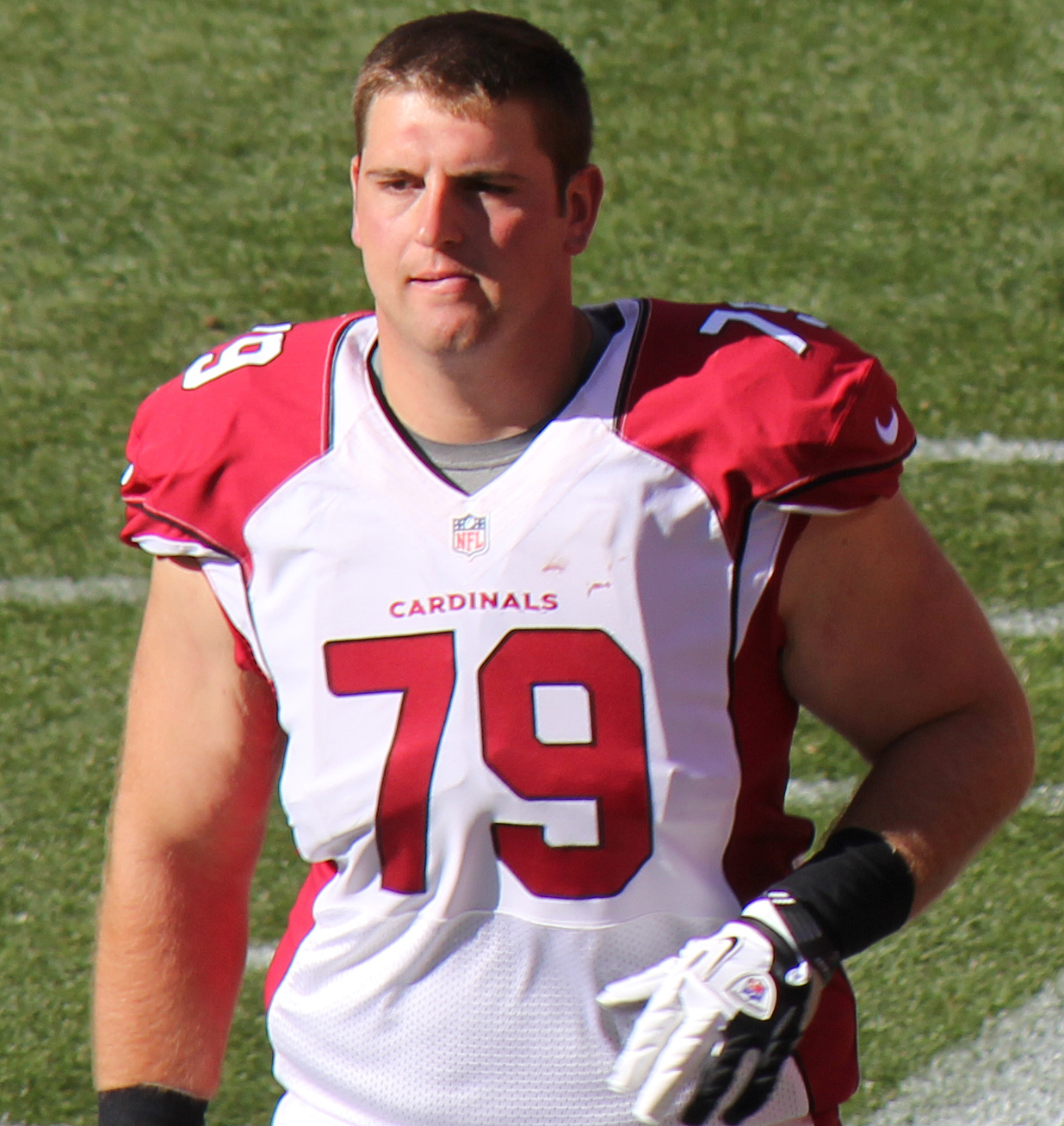
Sowell in 2014

On September 1, 2013, the Arizona Cardinals claimed Sowell off of waivers reuniting him with his former interim head coach and offensive coordinator in Indianapolis, Bruce Arians. Sowell began the season as the third right tackle on the depth chart. He then was named backup left tackle to Levi Brown and replaced him when he was ineffective. He ultimately performed well enough to win the starting position and the Cardinals then traded Brown to the Pittsburgh Steelers. On October 5, 2013, Sowell made his first career start at left tackle in a 22–6 victory over the Carolina Panthers.

He appeared in all 16 of the regular season games on special teams and started the last 12 games of the regular season at left tackle. He struggled throughout his first season in Arizona and was rated 76th out of 76 tackles that qualified by Pro Football Focus.

The following season, he lost his starting position to newly acquired free agent Jared Veldheer but was able to appear in all 16 regular season games.

On February 26, 2015, the Cardinals signed him to a one-year, $760,000 contract. In his last season with the Cardinals, he again played in all 16 regular season contests. Sowell also served as the team's emergency long snapper.

He finished his career in Arizona with a total of 48 games appearances and 12 starts.

=== Seattle Seahawks ===
On March 14, 2016, the Seattle Seahawks signed Sowell to a one-year, $1.00 million free agent contract with a signing bonus of $200,000.

He won the Seahawks' starting left tackle position in training camp and started the season. On October 23, 2016, Sowell sprained his left knee during a 6–6 tie with his former team, the Arizona Cardinals. Undrafted rookie George Fant started in his place for four games and performed well enough to win the starting position once Sowell returned from injury.

On October 12, 2016, it was reported that offensive line coach Tom Cable had announced that Sowell would compete with tackle Garry Gilliam for the starting right tackle position. Gilliam ultimately won the job, starting for the next game against the Philadelphia Eagles. On December 14, 2016, Sowell was benched in the fourth quarter of a 24–3 victory over the Los Angeles Rams. He was a healthy scratch the last two weeks of the season and finished the season appearing in ten games with nine starts.

=== Chicago Bears ===
On May 2, 2017, the Chicago Bears signed Sowell to a one-year, $775,000 contract. His arrival in Chicago reunited him with former Ole Miss and Cardinals teammate Bobby Massie. He competed against Tom Compton for a job as the backup offensive tackle, behind incumbent starters Massie and Charles Leno He was named the backup offensive tackle behind Leno to begin the regular season, and also worked as emergency long snapper while Patrick Scales was treating an injury.

On March 12, 2018, Sowell signed a two-year contract extension with the Bears. On December 9 against the Los Angeles Rams, Sowell caught a two-yard touchdown pass from quarterback Mitchell Trubisky on a trick play called "Santa's Sleigh". It was the lone touchdown as the Bears went on to win 15–6, marking the first instance in the Super Bowl era in which an offensive lineman scored the only touchdown in a game. Sowell also saw time at fullback, playing eight snaps at the position in the regular season finale against the Minnesota Vikings.

Before the 2019 season, Sowell switched to tight end and changed his number from 79 to 85. He played in the first two games of the regular season. During the year, he was released and re-signed multiple times to address other positional needs: after being waived on September 23 for defensive tackle Abdullah Anderson, he returned three days later; another release took place on September 28 for defensive end Jonathan Harris before coming back on October 1; an injury to quarterback Mitchell Trubisky led to Tyler Bray's promotion and Sowell's release on October 5, with the two returning to their respective posts four days later; he was released again on November 2 to promote James Vaughters while linebacker Isaiah Irving was out, and returned two days later.

== Personal life ==
On December 3, 2011, Sowell married his wife, Jessica. They have two daughters and two sons.

In high school, Sowell caught his first touchdown from Memphis rapper/streamer 1S1K SeanMario.
