= Isaiah Battle =

American football player (born 1993)

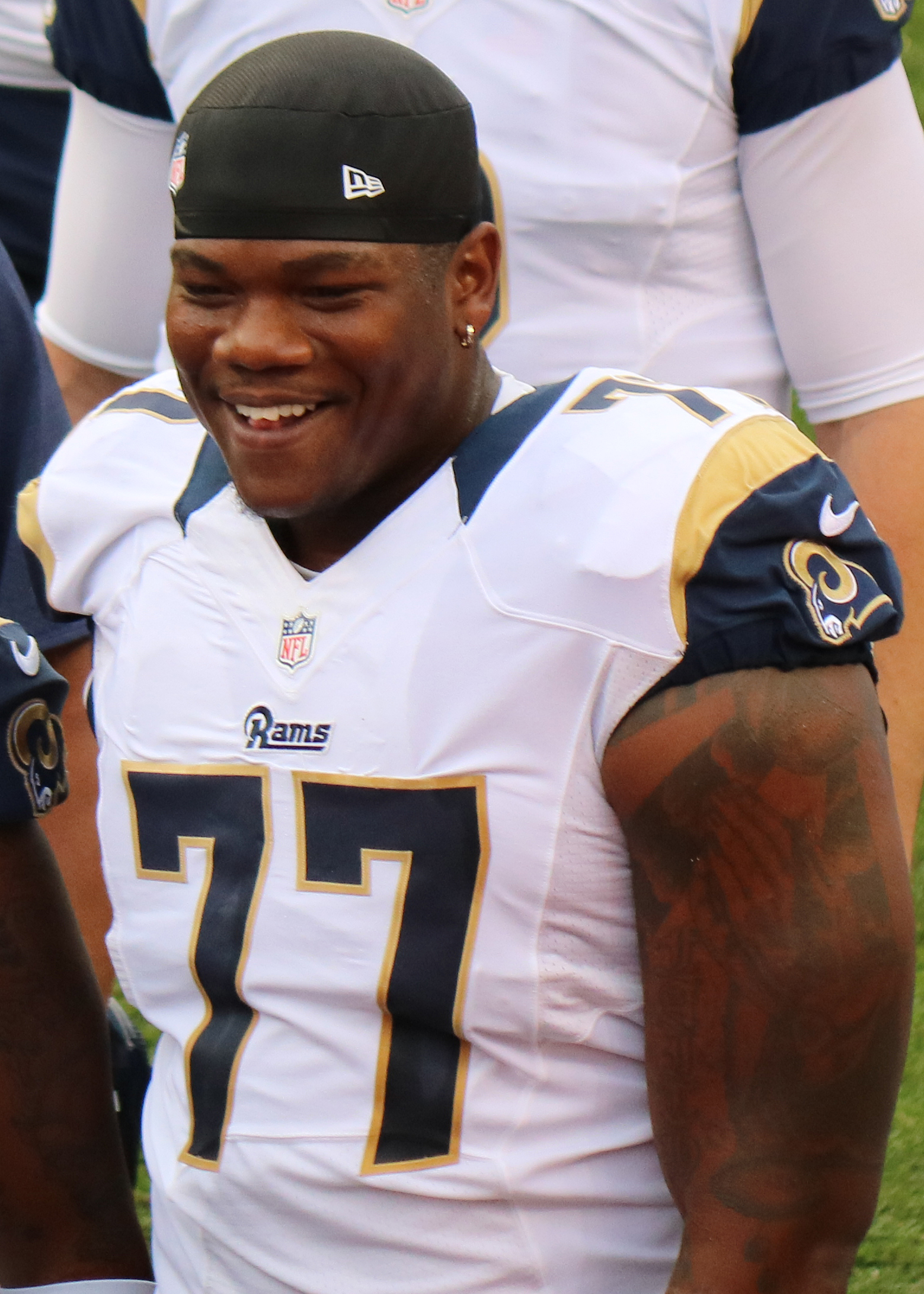
- Battle with the Los Angeles Rams in 2016

Profile
- Position: Offensive tackle

Personal information
- Born: February 10, 1993 (age 33); Brooklyn, New York, U.S.
- Listed height: 6 ft 7 in (2.01 m)
- Listed weight: 310 lb (141 kg)

Career information
- High school: Blue Ridge (Saint George, Virginia)
- College: Clemson (2012–2014)
- Supplemental draft: 2015: 5th round

Career history
- St. Louis / Los Angeles Rams (2015–2016); Kansas City Chiefs (2017)*; Seattle Seahawks (2017); Carolina Panthers (2019)*; Seattle Dragons (2020); Pittsburgh Maulers (2022)*; New Jersey Generals (2023); Houston Roughnecks (2024–2025)
- * Offseason or practice squad member only
- Stats at Pro Football Reference

Isaiah Battle (born February 10, 1993) is an American professional football offensive tackle. He was selected by the St. Louis Rams in the fifth round of the 2015 NFL supplemental draft after playing college football at Clemson.

== Professional career ==
=== Pre-draft ===
Battle declared for the NFL supplemental draft in 2015. On July 7, 2015, Battle held his Pro Day with 26 teams in attendance.

=== St. Louis Rams ===
Battle was taken in the fifth round of the supplemental draft by the St. Louis Rams, who gave up their fifth-round pick in the 2016 NFL draft. On July 27, 2015, Battle signed a four-year contract worth $2,508,864 with $228,864 guaranteed. On September 5, he was waived and subsequently signed to the team's practice squad. On November 18, 2015, he was signed to the active roster after Jamon Brown and Darrell Williams were placed on the injured reserve.

On September 3, 2016, Battle was waived by the Rams as part of final roster cuts and was signed to their practice squad the next day.

=== Kansas City Chiefs ===
On January 4, 2017, Battle signed a reserve/future contract with the Kansas City Chiefs.

=== Seattle Seahawks ===
On September 2, 2017, Battle was traded to the Seattle Seahawks. On November 1, 2017, Battle was waived by the Seahawks and re-signed to the practice squad. He was released on December 2, 2017, but was re-signed three days later. He signed a reserve/future contract with the Seahawks on January 2, 2018.

On September 1, 2018, Battle was waived by the Seahawks.

=== Carolina Panthers ===
On December 31, 2018, Battle signed a reserve/future contract with the Carolina Panthers. He was waived on May 6, 2019.

=== Seattle Dragons ===
On October 15, 2019, Battle was selected by the Seattle Dragons of the XFL in the first round of the 2020 XFL draft. He missed the first two games of the season with an ankle injury. He had his contract terminated when the league suspended operations on April 10, 2020.

=== Pittsburgh Maulers ===
On February 22, 2022, Battle was selected by the Pittsburgh Maulers of the United States Football League (USFL) in the sixth round of the 2022 USFL draft. On April 1, 2022, he was placed on the reserve/did not report list after failing to report to the team.

=== New Jersey Generals ===
Battle had his playing rights transferred to the New Jersey Generals on October 20, 2022.

Battle was placed on injured reserve on May 31, 2023. He re-signed with the team on July 11, 2023. The Generals folded when the XFL and USFL merged to create the United Football League (UFL).

=== Houston Roughnecks ===
On January 5, 2024, Battle was selected by the Houston Roughnecks during the 2024 UFL dispersal draft. He was waived on February 12, 2024. He was re-signed on May 7, 2024, and again on August 23, 2024.

On March 20, 2025, Battle was released by the Roughnecks. He was re-signed on April 7.
