= Garry Gilliam =

American football player (born 1990)

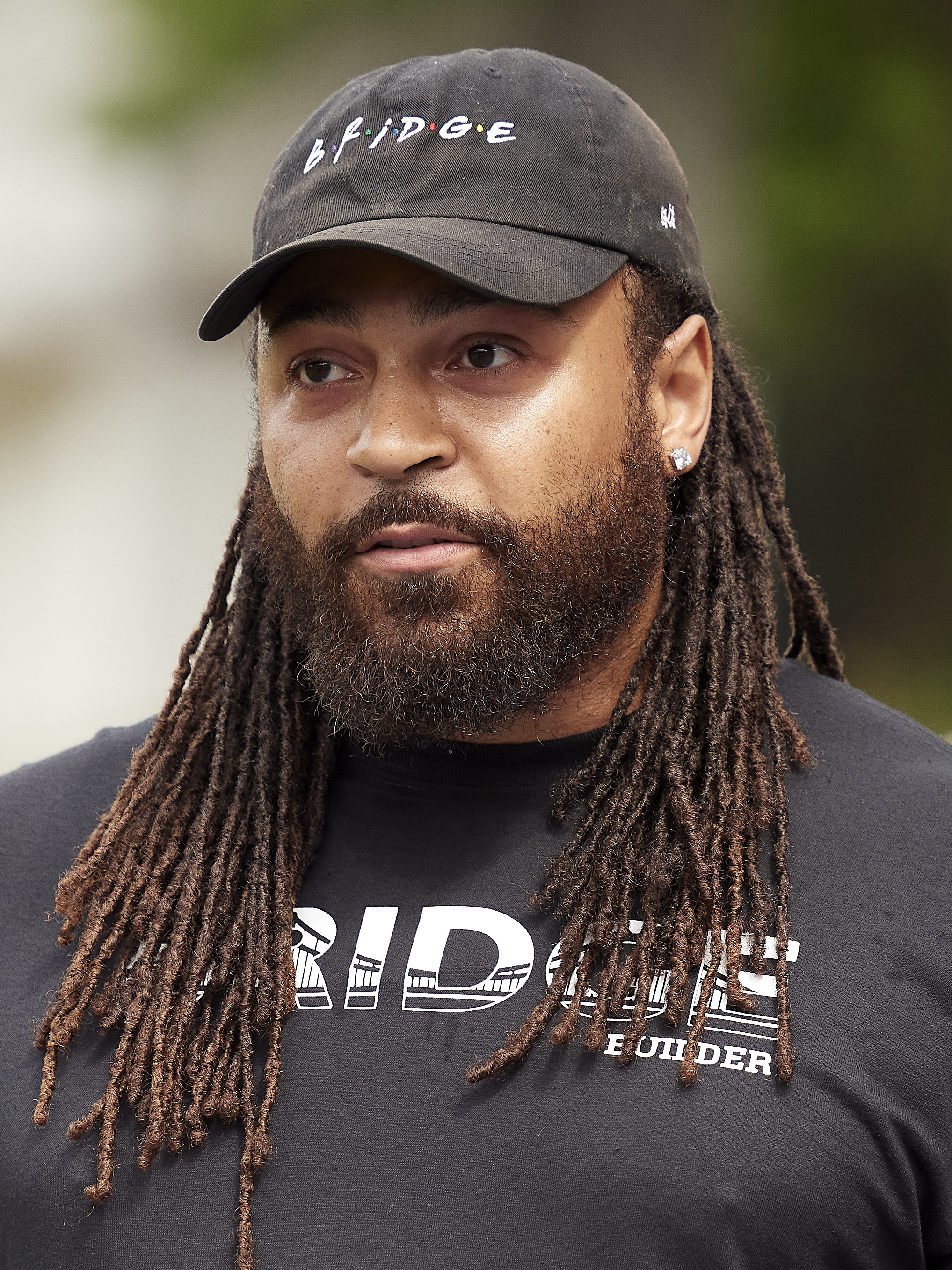
- Gilliam in 2022

No. 79, 76
- Position: Offensive tackle

Personal information
- Born: November 26, 1990 (age 35); Harrisburg, Pennsylvania, U.S.
- Listed height: 6 ft 6 in (1.98 m)
- Listed weight: 306 lb (139 kg)

Career information
- High school: Milton Hershey School (Hershey, Pennsylvania)
- College: Penn State
- NFL draft: 2014: undrafted

Career history
- Seattle Seahawks (2014–2016); San Francisco 49ers (2017–2018)

Career NFL statistics
- Games played: 68
- Games started: 31
- Stats at Pro Football Reference

Garry Montzell Gilliam Jr. (born November 26, 1990) is an American former professional football player who was an offensive tackle in the National Football League (NFL) for the Seattle Seahawks and San Francisco 49ers. He was signed as an undrafted free agent by the Seahawks after the 2014 NFL draft. He played college football for the Penn State Nittany Lions.

== Early life ==
Gilliam played high school football at Milton Hershey School in Hershey, Pennsylvania. He was an All-American, all-state, and All-Mid-Penn Conference selection. Gilliam played tight end and defensive end at Milton Hersey School. He recorded 350 receiving yards, 20 receptions, and four receiving touchdowns in his career. He also recorded 153 tackles, 12 sacks, and five interceptions.

== College career ==
Gilliam was a member of the Penn State Nittany Lions football team from 2009 to 2013. He played tight end up to his senior year. Before his senior season, he asked head coach Bill O'Brien if he could convert to offensive tackle since he knew that would improve his chances on playing in the NFL. He successfully transitioned to the tackle position and started for the Nittany Lions throughout his senior season.

== Professional career ==
=== Pre-draft ===
With only a single year of experience at offensive tackle on the collegiate level, Gilliam was not projected to be drafted and was not invited to the NFL Combine. During Penn State's Pro Day, the Seattle Seahawks were one of the few teams to give him a workout. The Seahawks were forward with their intentions on giving him an opportunity and had constant communication with him up until the draft. They also spoke about using him as a tight end in the future if needed. The Seahawks told him before the draft that they would sign him as an undrafted free agent.

Pre-draft measurables
Height	Weight	Arm length	Hand span	40-yard dash	10-yard split	20-yard split	20-yard shuttle	Three-cone drill	Vertical jump	Broad jump	Bench press
6 ft 5 5/8 in (1.97 m)	306 lb (139 kg)	34 1/2 in (0.88 m)	10 1/2 in (0.27 m)	5.03 s	1.68 s	2.91 s	4.56 s	7.59 s	35 in (0.89 m)	9 ft 5 in (2.87 m)	19 reps
All values from Penn State's Pro Day

=== Seattle Seahawks ===
==== 2014 season ====
Gilliam was signed by the Seattle Seahawks on May 10, 2014, after going undrafted in the 2014 NFL draft. On May 11, 2014, the Seahawks signed Gilliam to a three-year, $1.54 million undrafted free agent contract that includes a signing bonus of $12,000.

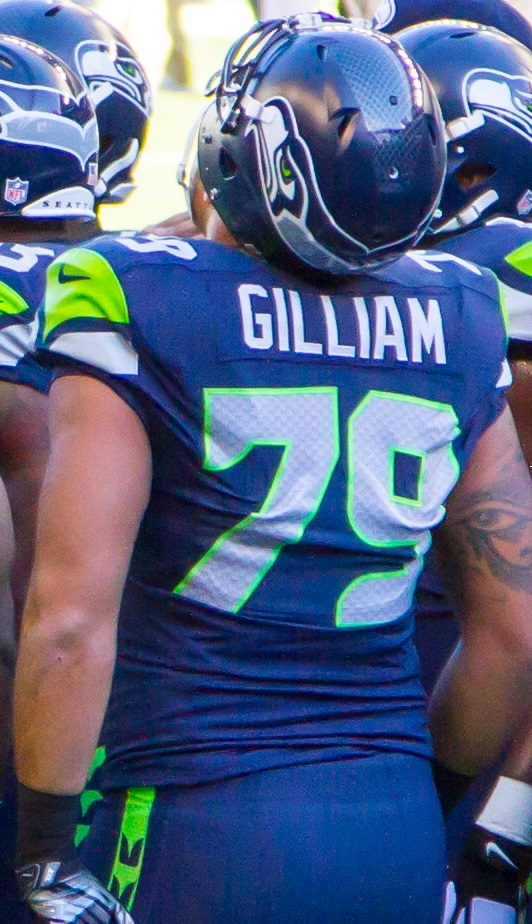
Gilliam with the Seahawks in 2014

Gilliam made his NFL debut at offensive tackle on September 4, 2014, against the Green Bay Packers. On October 5, 2014, he entered at left guard during the second half of the Seahawks' game against the Oakland Raiders after James Carpenter suffered an ankle injury.

On January 18, 2015, Gilliam caught a 19-yard touchdown pass on a fake field goal attempt from punter Jon Ryan during the Seahawks' 28–22 overtime NFC Championship Game victory over the Green Bay Packers. It was his first career reception and touchdown.

==== 2015 season ====
Gilliam began his second season as the backup left tackle behind Russell Okung. After starting right tackle Justin Britt was unable to perform well during the pre-season, Gilliam was moved into the starting position and earned it two weeks before the season opener against the St. Louis Rams. Britt was ultimately switched to left guard, with former left guard Alvin Bailey taking Gilliam's former position at backup left tackle. Throughout the first five weeks of the season he was the 74th-ranked offensive tackle in pass blocking and ranked 66th and run blocking. From weeks 5 to 10, he was ranked 75th in pass protection and 61st in run protection. He was ranked among the lowest throughout then season.

On March 14, 2016, he was awarded the fourth-largest amount of additional salary in the NFL's "performance-based pay" program receiving $329,384. The program pays players who play significant playing time and aren't compensated enough due to their contract. Gilliam received the fourth-largest amount since he started the entire season at right tackle, playing 98.05% of the Seahawks' offensive snaps, and was still being paid under his undrafted free-agent contract. His total salary was $839,384, instead of the $510,000 he was scheduled to earn.

==== 2016 season ====
Gilliam was slated to begin the season as the starting left tackle, after Russell Okung departed for the Denver Broncos via free agency in the off-season. With the Seahawks installing new starting offensive linemen at every position, Gilliam was moved to right tackle after free agent J'Marcus Webb twisted his knee in training camp. Free agent Bradley Sowell was then moved to the left tackle position since it was thought that Gilliam was better suited at right tackle than Sowell.

On November 16, 2016, Seahawks' head coach Pete Carroll announced that there would be an open competition between Gilliam and Bradley Sowell for the starting right tackle position. Sowell had lost his starting left tackle position to undrafted rookie George Fant after he suffered a knee sprain that kept him out of four games. Two days later, Carroll announced that Gilliam will remain the starter against the Philadelphia Eagles.

On December 4, 2016, it was reported that Gilliam, who had started the previous 27 games, had lost his starting right tackle position to Sowell during the week and would be a healthy scratch for the following game against the Carolina Panthers. On December 15, 2016, the Seahawks benched Sowell in the fourth quarter of a 24–3 victory over the Los Angeles Rams and had Gilliam enter the game in his place. He remained the starting right tackle for the last two games of the season and finished his last season with the team appearing in 14 games with 13 starts.

=== San Francisco 49ers ===
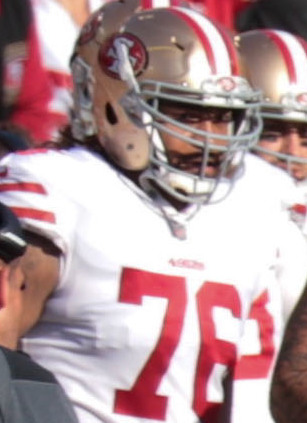
Gilliam with the 49ers in 2017

On April 17, 2017, the San Francisco 49ers signed Gilliam to a one-year, $2.2 million offer sheet. The following day, the Seahawks declined to match the offer, officially making Gilliam a member of the 49ers. He played in eight games in 2017 before suffering a knee injury and was placed on injured reserve on November 7.

On February 27, 2018, the 49ers signed Gillam to a two-year, $8 million contract extension with nearly $4 million guaranteed.

On February 13, 2019, Gilliam was released by the 49ers.

== Personal life ==
Gilliam was born to Thelma Shifflet and Garry Gilliam Sr. and raised in Harrisburg, Pennsylvania. He has a brother, Victor, and a sister, Angel. He has a long time live in girlfriend, Jocelyn Bramlett, and three children. In his spare time, he enjoys working on graphic designs and graduated from Penn State in December 2014 with a triple major in Business, Advertisement, and Psychology. He played tight end from the age of seven until his senior year at Penn State. In high school, he qualified for state track and field championships and won a conference championship for the javelin.

Gilliam started a program in late 2019 named 'The Bridge' that used the closed Bishop McDevitt High School in Harrisburg and transform it into 'Eco-Villages'. However, in 2024, it was later revealed that even after being given a three million dollar grant and paying the owner, Penn Holdings had refused to honor the lease on the property for three years and wanted 3 million dollars more to sell the property. In 2024, the owner of the property Penn Holdings, decided the building would not host the Ecovillage, citing Gilliam's continuing refusal to pay the additional money he wanted to sell the property to Gilliam. In total, Gilliam had been given a total of 7.5 million dollars to secure the property but instead has secured other properties and funded summer programs for children in the central Pennsylvania area.
