= Neiko Thorpe =

American football player and coach (born 1990)

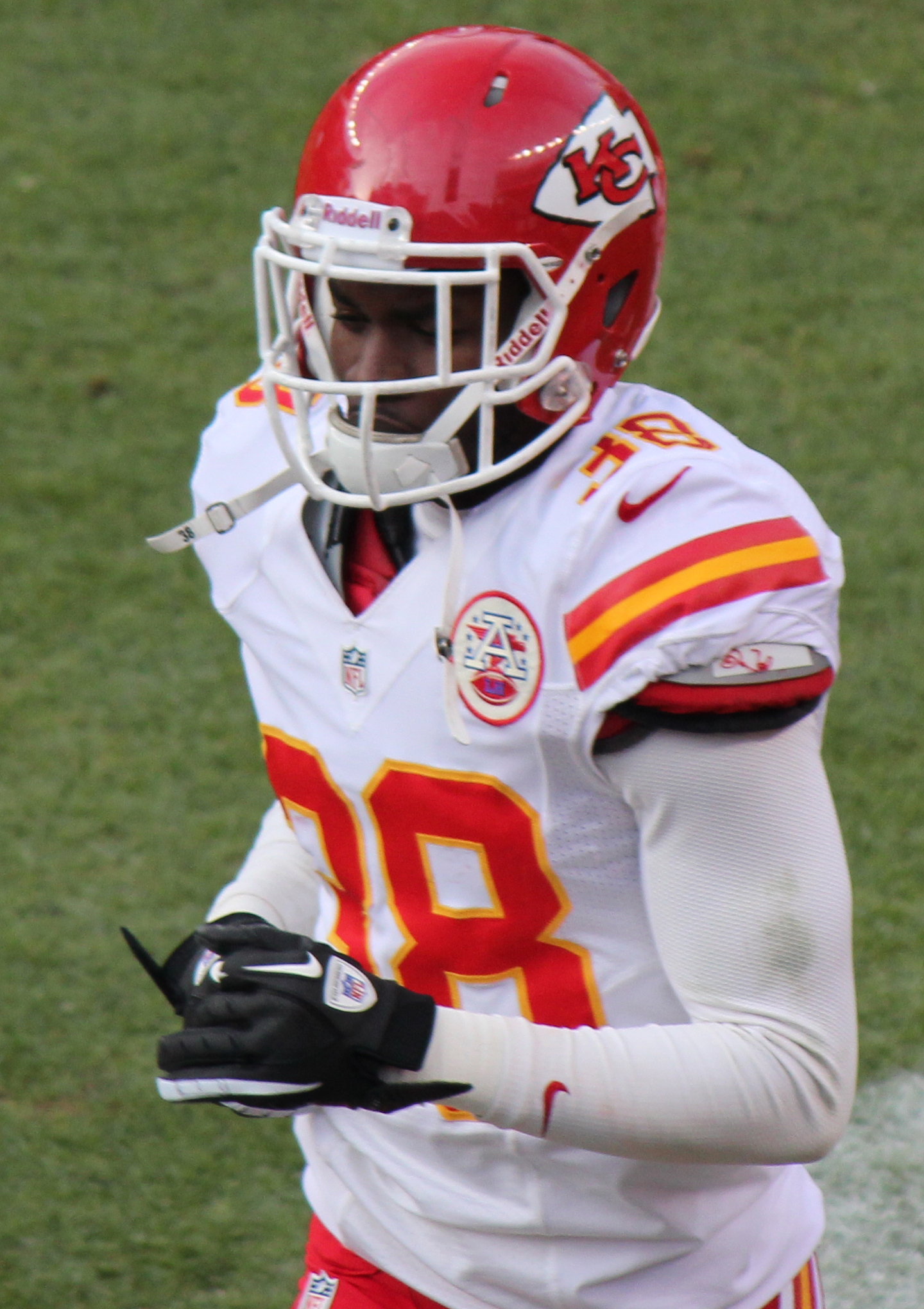
- Thorpe with the Kansas City Chiefs in 2012

Seattle Seahawks
- Title: Defensive assistant- Defensive backs coach

Personal information
- Born: February 1, 1990 (age 36); Southfield, Michigan, U.S.
- Listed height: 6 ft 2 in (1.88 m)
- Listed weight: 210 lb (95 kg)

Career information
- Position: Cornerback (No. 38, 31, 27, 23)
- High school: Tucker (Tucker, Georgia)
- College: Auburn
- NFL draft: 2012: undrafted

Career history

Playing
- Kansas City Chiefs (2012); Toronto Argonauts (2013); Oakland Raiders (2014–2015); Indianapolis Colts (2016)*; Seattle Seahawks (2016–2020)
- * Offseason or practice squad member only

Coaching
- Seattle Seahawks (2022) Coaching intern; Seattle Seahawks (2023) Defensive assistant; Seattle Seahawks (2024) Player engagement/Football operations assistant; Seattle Seahawks (2025–present) Defensive assistant/Special teams assistant

Awards and highlights
- Playing: BCS national champion (2011); Coaching: Super Bowl champion (LX)

Career NFL statistics
- Total tackles: 100
- Fumble recoveries: 3
- Pass deflections: 9
- Interceptions: 1
- Stats at Pro Football Reference

Neiko Thorpe (born February 1, 1990) is an American former professional football cornerback and coach. He is a defensive assistant/defensive backs coach for the Seattle Seahawks of the National Football League (NFL). He signed with the Kansas City Chiefs as an undrafted free agent in 2012. He played college football for the Auburn Tigers and was a member of the 2010 BCS National Championship team.

== Early life ==
Thorpe attended Tucker High School in Tucker, Georgia, where he was selected Under Armour All-America team in his senior season. He registered 18 sacks as a junior, earning an honorable mention all-county. He had 64 tackles including six tackles for loss, 11 pass breakups, three interceptions, and forced a fumble as a senior. Thorpe also ran track at Tucker, posting personal-best times of 14.18 seconds in the 110m hurdles and 38.35 seconds in the 300m hurdles.

Considered a three-star recruit by Rivals.com, Thorpe was listed as the No. 35 safety in the nation in 2008. He was rated as the 11th best cornerback in the nation by Scout.com and was ranked as the 53rd best player in Georgia by SuperPrep.

== College career ==
Thorpe played college football at Auburn. Thorpe played as a true freshman, contributing on special teams and at corner in 11 games with 29 total tackles. He was selected to the Coaches’ All SEC-Freshmen Team. In his first college game, he led the Tigers with seven tackles including five solo against Louisiana-Monroe. In his first career start, Thorpe recorded his first career interception and returned it 59 yards against Arkansas. He finished his freshman season tied for ninth-most tackles on the team—20 of them being solo stops. Neiko also tied for the second-most interceptions with two and most return interception yardage with 101 yards.

In 2009, Thorpe started all 13 games and had a total of 84 tackles, 56 of them being solo. With this breakout season, he was named Phil Steele’s Third-team Midseason All-SEC. In the first game of his sophomore season, he started at cornerback against Louisiana Tech. He continued to show contribution to the team when he totaled seven tackles, five of them being solo, in a victory against Mississippi State along with an interception against West Virginia that ended a scoring threat at the AU 25-yard line. Against Arkansas, he set a career-high of 11 tackles, 8 being solo tackles. Thorpe broke up two passes against UK, one against LSU, and one against Ole Miss which is credited to his speed and ability to make plays on the ball. Thorpe finished the year with a performance in the Outback Bowl vs. Northwestern. He had a career and team high of 14 tackles (13 solo) and also an interception. The last tackle came on the last play of the game, that prevented the game-winning touchdown on a fake field goal in overtime when he made a tackle just short of the goal line.

As a junior, Thorpe made the Coaches’ Second-team Preseason SEC and proved his preseason rank throughout the season by appearing and starting in 13 of 14 games. Halfway through the season, Thorpe almost tied his career high with 10 tackles—all were solo stops—and had one pass breakup. A few games later he beat his career high of tackles with 12 against Alabama and also had a tackle for loss for minus 1 yard and two PBUs. Thorpe and his team continued on to the SEC championship game vs. South Carolina and contributed four tackles. After the SEC Championship belonged to the Tigers, they took on Oregon in the BCS National Championship Game where Thorpe had a pair of tackles and one PBU, but he also gave up an 81-yard reception to Jeff Maehl. Thorpe finished college with a total of 279 tackles, 7 interceptions, 34 pass deflections, 2 forced fumbles and one touchdown.

== Professional career ==
Pre-draft measurables
| Height | Weight | Arm length | Hand span | Wingspan | 40-yard dash | 10-yard split | 20-yard split | 20-yard shuttle | Three-cone drill | Vertical jump | Broad jump | Bench press |
|---|---|---|---|---|---|---|---|---|---|---|---|---|
| 6 ft 1 1/4 in (1.86 m) | 198 lb (90 kg) | 30 3/4 in (0.78 m) | 8 1/2 in (0.22 m) | 6 ft 6 1/2 in (1.99 m) | 4.39 s | 1.55 s | 2.56 s | 4.22 s | 7.13 s | 38.0 in (0.97 m) | 11 ft 5 in (3.48 m) | 4 reps |
All values are from Auburn’s Pro Day

=== Kansas City Chiefs ===
On April 30, 2012, Thorpe signed with the Kansas City Chiefs as an undrafted free agent. On August 31, 2012, he was released on the day of roster cuts. On September 1, 2012, he was signed to the practice squad. On October 6, 2012, he was promoted from practice squad to the active roster after the team released center Bryan Mattison. On October 9, 2012, he was released after the team re-signed offensive lineman Bryan Mattison. On November 11, 2012, he was promoted from the practice squad to the active roster after the team placed defensive tackle Glenn Dorsey on injured reserve. During his time on the active roster, Thorpe played in nine games and totaled five solo tackles for the season. On August 25, 2013, he was cut by the Chiefs.

=== Toronto Argonauts ===
On September 6, 2013, Thorpe signed a practice roster agreement with the Toronto Argonauts of the Canadian Football League. He was activated on October 14 and started in the team's final five games including the East Final loss to Hamilton. He asked to be released by the Argonauts on January 14, 2014 as he continued to pursue NFL opportunities.

=== Oakland Raiders ===
Thorpe was signed by the Oakland Raiders as a reserve/future free agent, January 13, 2014. He impressed the Raiders during training camp and preseason and made the team after the final cuts to the 53-man roster on August 30, 2014. On September 3, 2016, Thorpe was waived by the team as part of final roster cuts.

=== Indianapolis Colts ===
One day after his release from the Raiders, Thorpe was claimed off waivers by the Indianapolis Colts on September 4, 2016. He was released by the Colts on September 6, 2016.

=== Seattle Seahawks ===
On September 13, 2016, Thorpe was signed by the Seattle Seahawks. On March 14, 2017, Thorpe re-signed with the Seahawks. After signing with the team Thorpe became a permanent fixture on Seattle’s special teams unit where he was regarded as one of the best gunners in the league. Thorpe served as special teams captain for the Seahawks.

On March 23, 2019, Thorpe re-signed with the Seahawks. On December 6, 2019, Thorpe underwent season-ending sports hernia surgery. He was placed on injured reserve on December 11, 2019.

Thorpe re-signed with the Seahawks on April 13, 2020. He was placed on injured reserve on October 7, 2020, with a hip injury. He was activated on November 14, 2020, but was placed back on injured reserve four days later with a groin injury.

== Coaching career ==
Thorpe was named as an assistant for both defense and special teams for the Seattle Seahawks prior to the 2025 season. He was part of the coaching staff that won Super Bowl LX over the New England Patriots 29–13.
