= George Fant (American football) =

American football player (born 1992)

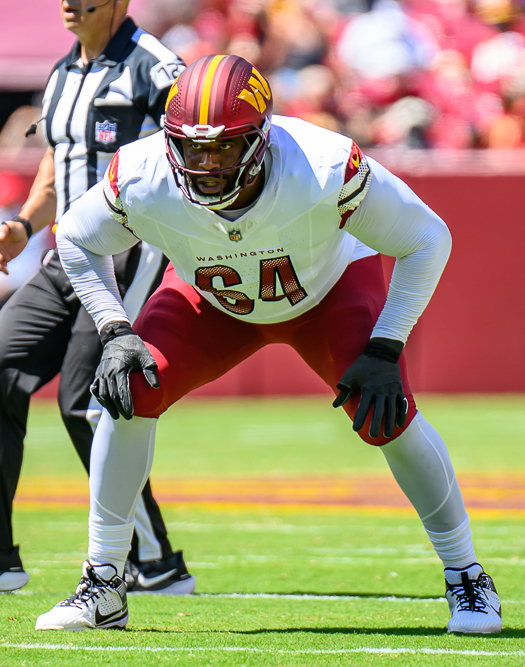
- Fant with the Washington Commanders in 2025

Profile
- Position: Offensive tackle

Personal information
- Born: July 19, 1992 (age 34); Bowling Green, Kentucky, U.S.
- Listed height: 6 ft 5 in (1.96 m)
- Listed weight: 296 lb (134 kg)

Career information
- High school: Warren Central (Bowling Green)
- College: Western Kentucky (2011–2015)
- NFL draft: 2016: undrafted

Career history
- Seattle Seahawks (2016–2019); New York Jets (2020–2022); Houston Texans (2023); Seattle Seahawks (2024); Washington Commanders (2025)

Career NFL statistics as of 2025
- Games played: 105
- Games started: 75
- Stats at Pro Football Reference

George Fant (born July 19, 1992) is an American professional football offensive tackle. He played college football and basketball for the Western Kentucky Hilltoppers and signed with the Seattle Seahawks as an undrafted free agent in 2016. Fant has also played for the New York Jets, Houston Texans, and Washington Commanders.

== Early life ==
Fant attended Warren Central High School where he lettered and started all four years in basketball. As a junior, he earned second-team All-State honors. As a senior, he recorded 62.2% from the field and led the team with 75 blocks, averaged 21.5 points per game and 11.7 rebounds per game. For the season, he earned first-team All-State honors. When he graduated, he was the school's all-time leader in rebounds (1,039) and third in points (1,805). He was rated as a three-star recruit by Rivals.com and was listed on their Top 150 as the 150th best senior in the nation.

== College career ==
Fant attended Western Kentucky University, where he majored in recreation and played basketball and football.

=== Basketball career ===
As a freshman in 2011–2012, he appeared in 31 games with 24 starts. He averaged 26.4 minutes per game. He averaged 10.4 points, 6.1 rebounds, and had a total of 37 blocks and 29 steals. He also led the team in field goal percentage (.476). His 321 points scored ranked seventh all-time for a freshman in school history. As a sophomore in 2012–2013 he averaged 12.8 points and 6.6 rebounds per game. He shot 48.2% from the field going 163 for 338. After averaging 13.0 points and 7.5 rebounds per game he was named to the All-Sun Belt Conference tournament team. He was named All-Sun Belt third-team. In 2013–2014 as a junior, he averaged 13.3 points and 6.6 rebounds per game. He finished second on the team in scoring and led the team in rebounding for the second straight season. He finished seventh in the conference in rebounding. He led the team in field goal percentage with (.530), which was good for fifth in the conference. He was named to the All-Sun Belt third-team. As a senior in 2014–2015, he led the team in rebounding with 8.4 rebounds per game which was good for third in conference. He averaged 13.8 points per game, a career high. He recorded 12 double-doubles, second most in Conference USA. He was named All-Conference for the third consecutive season with second-team honors.

=== Football career ===
Throughout his first four years at Western Kentucky, friends and coaches urged Fant to join the Hilltopper football team but he refused. He received letters from multiple NFL teams in spring 2015 asking if he were interested in giving professional football a chance but disregarded the letters and threw them away. Fant decided to transition to football after weighing his options of either playing basketball overseas in Poland or attempting a football career. With a wife and child to care for, he chose to play football. Western Kentucky tight ends Tyler Higbee and Devin Scott helped him learn the tight end position and tight ends coach Ryan Wallace also worked with him. He bulked up from 250 lbs to 296 lbs for football. Fant also said that he studied many tapes of another basketball-to-football convert, tight end Jimmy Graham.

Fant used his fifth year of eligibility to join the Western Kentucky Hilltoppers football team as a tight end. For the season, he appeared in two games, recording one reception for seven yards, as well as two tackles.

== Professional career ==
=== Pre-draft ===
Fant was expected to go undrafted after playing only a single year of tight end at the collegiate football level. Due to his limited experience, Fant was not one of the 15 collegiate tight ends to attend the NFL Scouting Combine. On March 29, 2016, he attended Western Kentucky's pro day, along with Brandon Doughty, Tyler Higbee, Prince Charles Iworah, and 11 other prospects. Fant was listed as an offensive lineman during WKU's pro day and weighed 296 lbs, 26 lbs heavier than his playing weight of 270 lbs during the season. He impressed the Seahawks' co-director of player personnel Trent Kirchner with his athletic ability and worked out at multiple positions including linebacker, defensive end, defensive tackle, tight end, and offensive tackle. Although he did not have game film, he was able to impress enough with his athletic ability and size that the Seahawks signed him solely based on that single workout. Offensive line coach Tom Cable had to make the decision between Fant and another offensive line prospect but chose Fant because he was a "long-armed athlete".

Pre-draft measurables
| Height | Weight | Arm length | Hand span | 40-yard dash | 10-yard split | 20-yard split | 20-yard shuttle | Three-cone drill | Vertical jump | Broad jump | Bench press |
|---|---|---|---|---|---|---|---|---|---|---|---|
| 6 ft 4 7/8 in (1.95 m) | 296 lb (134 kg) | 34 7/8 in (0.89 m) | 9 3/4 in (0.25 m) | 4.84 s | 1.77 s | 2.82 s | 4.54 s | 7.20 s | 37 in (0.94 m) | 9 ft 11 in (3.02 m) | 22 reps |
All values from Western Kentucky Pro Day

=== Seattle Seahawks ===
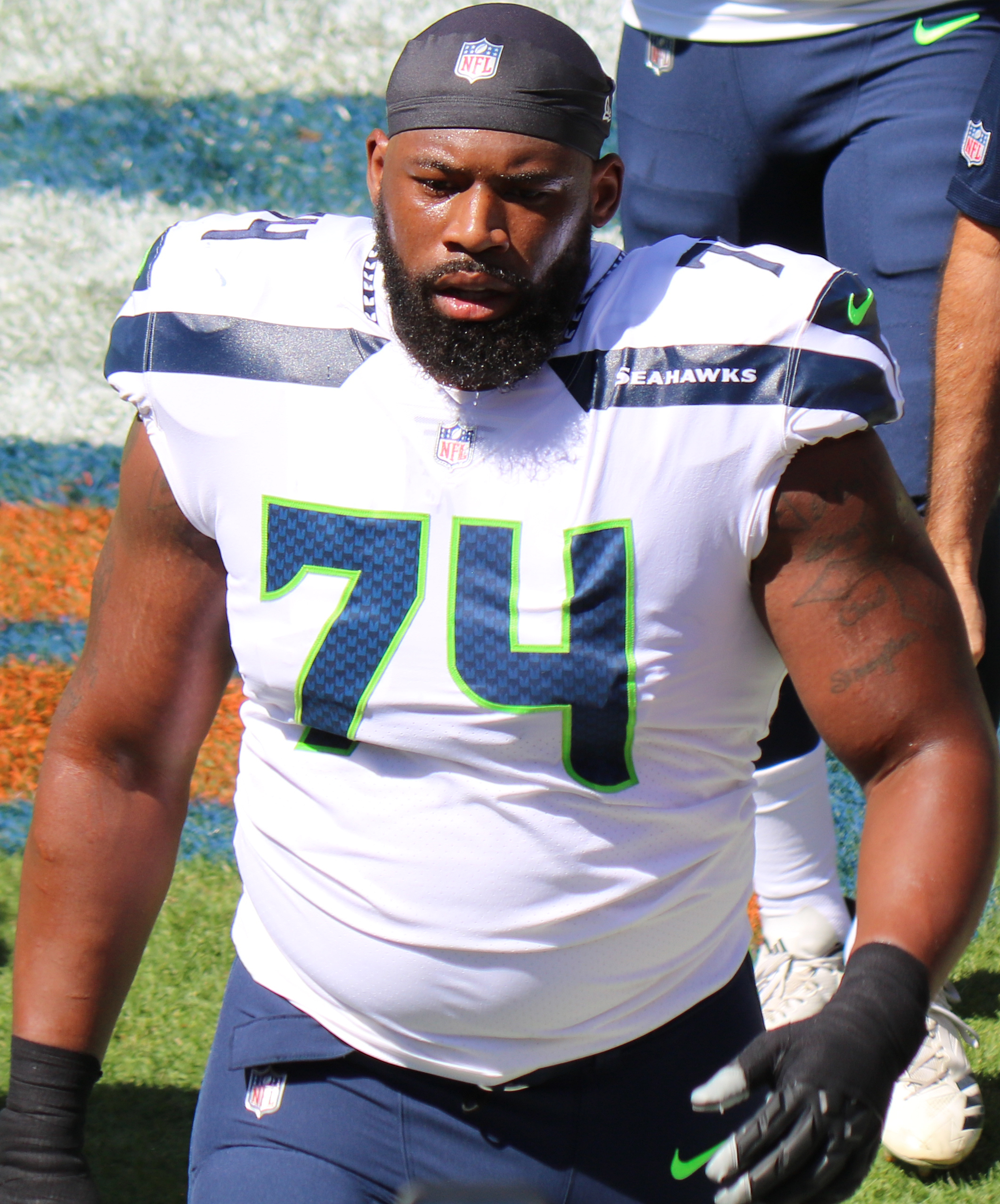
Fant with the Seattle Seahawks in 2018

==== 2016 ====
Fant signed with the Seattle Seahawks as an undrafted free agent on May 6, 2016.

Throughout training camp he learned the offensive tackle position quickly and did well enough to win the backup left tackle job behind Bradley Sowell to begin the regular season. He made his professional regular-season debut on October 23, 2016, and played 24 snaps after Sowell sprained his knee during the 6–6 tie with the Arizona Cardinals. He made his first career start during Week 8 against the New Orleans Saints after Sowell was still unable to play due to injury. Fant committed two clipping penalties in his first two starts and also committed a false start.

He is the third player that Cable has successfully transitioned into an offensive lineman with little or no collegiate experience at the position. The Seahawks' starting right tackle, Garry Gilliam, was undrafted with only a single year of collegiate experience as a lineman and started in seven months. The first player was J. R. Sweezy, who had no experience, playing only defensive end in college. He transitioned to guard successfully in five months. Fant is the most dramatic change, earning the starting left tackle position in less than 20 months.

On November 13, 2016, he made his third career start against the New England Patriots and was credited with not committing a single assignment error in the Seahawks' 31–24 victory. He ultimately did well enough in his first four career starts that he remained the starter at left tackle once Sowell returned from his injury. He played the last ten consecutive games of the season as the Seattle Seahawks' starting left tackle and finished his rookie season appearing in 14 games with ten starts.

==== 2017 ====
In the second game of the 2017 preseason, Fant tore his ACL and was ruled out for the season. He was placed on injured reserve on September 2, 2017.

==== 2018 ====
After rookie tight end Will Dissly got injured in a week 4 matchup with the Cardinals, Fant started to play an offensive tackle/tight end hybrid role. He would line up as a sixth offensive lineman, either on the line itself or outside, and declare himself an eligible receiver. Fant had great success in this new role and helped the 2018 Seahawks achieve the number one ranked rushing offense in the league.

On December 10, 2018, in a week 13 Monday Night Football matchup against the Minnesota Vikings, Fant recorded his first career reception, a 9-yard pass from quarterback Russell Wilson.

==== 2019 ====
Fant continued to function as a hybrid lineman for the Seahawks in 2019. He also functioned as the primary backup offensive tackle, filling in for an injured Duane Brown during parts of the season.

On December 2, 2019, in a Monday Night Football matchup against the Vikings, Fant garnered attention for helping the Seahawks rush for a season-high 218 yards in a 37–30 win. He reported as an eligible receiver on 42 plays during the game and lined up at multiple positions along the line.

=== New York Jets ===
On April 23, 2020, Fant signed a three-year, $30 million contract with the New York Jets. He was named the Jets starting right tackle in 2020, starting 13 games there, plus two at left tackle in place of an injured Mekhi Becton. He was once again named the starting right tackle in 2021, but became the left tackle starter in Week 2 after a season-ending injury to Becton. He started the remainder of the season there.

Fant was named the starting left tackle to begin the 2022 season. He was placed on injured reserve on September 27, 2022. He was activated on December 3. Fant was placed back on injured reserve on January 7, 2023.

=== Houston Texans ===
On July 28, 2023, Fant signed a one-year deal with the Houston Texans. He started 13 games at right tackle for Houston in 2023.

=== Seattle Seahawks (second stint) ===
On March 13, 2024, Fant signed with the Seattle Seahawks. Fant was released on March 4, 2025.

=== Washington Commanders ===
Fant signed with the Washington Commanders on August 19, 2025.

== Personal life ==
Fant is married to former Western Kentucky women's basketball player Chastity Gooch and has four children with her.
