= 2018 Chicago Bears season =

99th season in franchise history; first playoff appearance since 2010

- Owner: Virginia Halas McCaskey
- General manager: Ryan Pace
- Head coach: Matt Nagy
- Offensive coordinator: Mark Helfrich
- Defensive coordinator: Vic Fangio
- Home stadium: Soldier Field

Results
- Record: 12–4
- Division place: 1st NFC North
- Playoffs: Lost Wild Card Playoffs (vs. Eagles) 15–16
- All-Pros: 4: OLB Khalil Mack; CB Kyle Fuller; S Eddie Jackson; PR Tarik Cohen
- Pro Bowlers: 8: QB Mitchell Trubisky; T Charles Leno; C Cody Whitehair; DT Akiem Hicks; OLB Khalil Mack; CB Kyle Fuller; FS Eddie Jackson; RS Tarik Cohen

Uniform
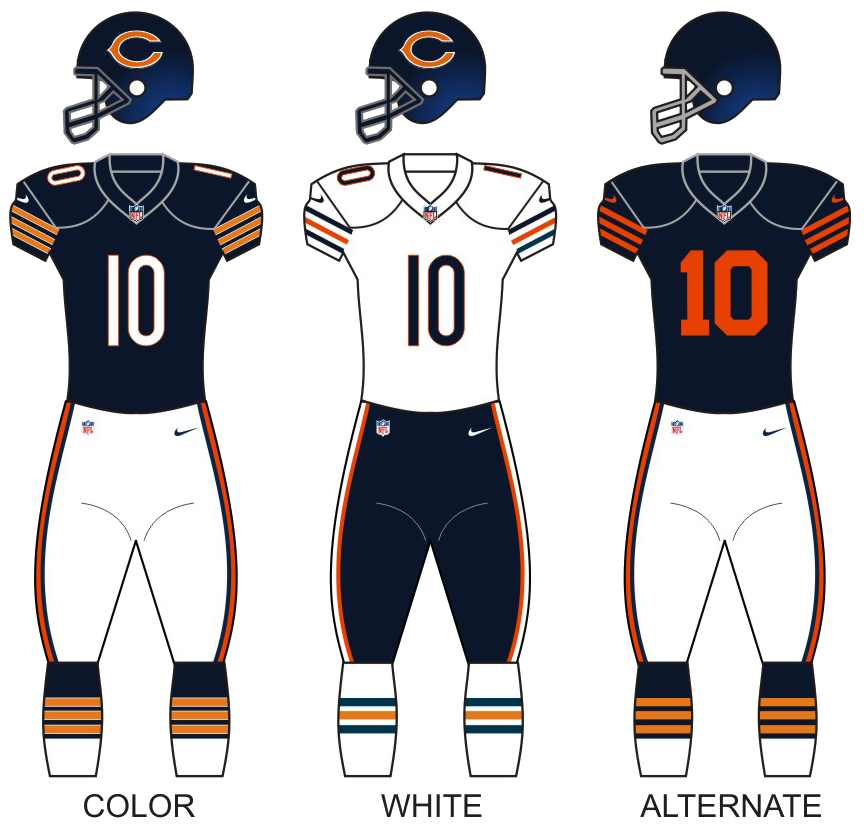

The 2018 season was the Chicago Bears' 99th season in the National Football League (NFL), as well as the first under head coach Matt Nagy, who took over the job after John Fox was fired in 2017 following a three-year tenure.

2018 marked the Bears' first winning season since 2012 and their first playoff appearance since 2010. The Bears ensured improvement over their 5–11 record from the previous season in Week 10 when they defeated their division rival Detroit Lions. In Week 12, they scored their eighth win of the season, also against the Lions, ensuring that the Bears would not have a losing season for the first time since 2013. With a Week 14 win over the Los Angeles Rams, the Bears clinched their first winning season since 2012. With their Week 15 win over the rival Green Bay Packers, the Bears clinched their first playoff berth and division title since 2010. They finished the season 12–4 with a win over the Minnesota Vikings. Mitch Trubisky became the first Bears quarterback to make it to a Pro Bowl since Jim McMahon did so in their Super Bowl XX-winning 1985 season.

The season ended in disappointment as they lost to the defending Super Bowl champion Philadelphia Eagles, who they had helped get into the playoffs in the last game of the season, in the NFC Wild Card Game 16–15 on January 6, 2019, at Soldier Field after Cody Parkey's game-winning field goal was blocked and hit the crossbar twice as time expired, which was the first time since 2005 that the Bears went one-and-done and their first Wild Card playoff loss since 1991. The Bears did not have another winning season or division title until 2025.

== Offseason ==
=== Organizational changes ===
On January 1, 2018, head coach John Fox was fired after spending three seasons with the Bears, compiling a 14–34 record. Two days later, the Bears began interviewing for the position starting with defensive coordinator Vic Fangio, followed by Minnesota Vikings defensive coordinator George Edwards (January 4), Vikings offensive coordinator Pat Shurmur and New England Patriots offensive coordinator Josh McDaniels (January 5), Philadelphia Eagles quarterback coach John DeFilippo (January 6), and Kansas City Chiefs offensive coordinator Matt Nagy (January 7). The day after his interview, Nagy was ultimately hired as the 16th head coach in franchise history.

Nagy's first assistant coach hiring was Harry Hiestand as offensive line coach, joining the team on January 10; Hiestand had spent the last six seasons with the Notre Dame Fighting Irish at the same position, while also working as the OL coach for the Bears from 2005 to 2009. Two days later, the Bears replaced offensive coordinator Dowell Loggains, who departed the Bears to join the Miami Dolphins in the same position on January 4, with former Oregon Ducks head coach Mark Helfrich, while also hiring three new coaches: former Bears assistants Chris Tabor and Charles London as special teams and running backs coaches, respectively, and Mike Furrey as wide receivers coach. Tabor served as an assistant special teams coach with the team from 2008 to 2010 before joining the Cleveland Browns as the special teams coordinator, while London had spent the last three seasons as the running backs coach of the Houston Texans. A former wide receiver, Furrey was Nagy's New York Dragons teammate in the Arena Football League in 2002, which was followed by an eight-year NFL career, including a 2006 campaign in which he ranked second in the league in receptions with 98; he was most recently the head coach of the Limestone Saints football team. During the day, Fangio signed a three-year extension to remain in Chicago. On January 13, the Bears hired New York Giants tight ends coach Kevin M. Gilbride to serve in the same role. Brock Olivo, a former colleague of Nagy in Kansas City and Denver Broncos special teams coordinator, joined the Bears as an assistant special teams coach on January 19.

In January, head trainer Nate Breske was released by the team, as were strength coaches Jason George and Rick Perry. In their places, the Bears hired Browns trainer Andre Tucker and Washington State University strength and conditioning coach Jason Loscalzo, respectively.

On February 27, the Bears formally announced their full staff, with every defensive coach returning to their posts for the 2018 season. Other newcomers included Brad Childress as a senior offensive consultant, Donovan Raiola as assistant offensive line coach, Brian Ginn and Mike Snyder as offensive quality control coaches, Shane Toub as an offensive assistant, and Bill Shuey as defensive quality control coach. Childress was the head coach of the Minnesota Vikings before joining the Chiefs in 2013, and served as their co-offensive coordinator alongside Nagy in 2016. He had intended to retire after 2017, but elected to rejoin Nagy in Chicago. A former center, Raiola was on the Bears' practice squad in 2009 and worked with Hiestand in Chicago before following him to Notre Dame as a graduate assistant for two years. Ginn was Nagy's wide receiver at Delaware before becoming a coach for the school. Shuey was a colleague of Nagy's during their tenures with the Eagles and was most recently working as the Widener Pride's defensive coordinator. Toub, the son of Chiefs and former Bears special teams coordinator Dave Toub, was a graduate assistant for the Illinois Fighting Illini under ex-Bears head coach Lovie Smith in 2017.

=== Roster changes ===
Position	Player	Free agency Tag	Date signed	2018 team
OLB	Sam Acho	UFA	March 14	Chicago Bears
CB	Prince Amukamara	UFA	March 14	Chicago Bears
WR	Josh Bellamy	RFA	March 13	Chicago Bears
TE	Daniel Brown	ERFA	March 16	Chicago Bears
CB	Bryce Callahan	RFA	March 13	Chicago Bears
OL	Tom Compton	UFA	March 22	Minnesota Vikings
RB	Benny Cunningham	UFA	March 22	Chicago Bears
LS	Andrew DePaola	UFA	March 16	Oakland Raiders
CB	Kyle Fuller	UFA	March 16	Chicago Bears
OLB	Lamarr Houston	UFA		
WR	Dontrelle Inman	UFA	October 16	Indianapolis Colts
NT	John Jenkins	UFA	April 8	Chicago Bears
ILB	Christian Jones	UFA	March 15	Detroit Lions
CB	Sherrick McManis	UFA	March 22	Chicago Bears
WR	Cameron Meredith	RFA	April 11	New Orleans Saints
TE	Zach Miller	UFA	June 4	Chicago Bears
K	Mike Nugent	UFA	August 3	Oakland Raiders
P	Pat O'Donnell	UFA	March 16	Chicago Bears
QB	Mark Sanchez	UFA	November 19	Washington Redskins
K	Cairo Santos	UFA	March 15	New York Jets
LS	Patrick Scales	ERFA	March 27	Chicago Bears
OL	Bradley Sowell	UFA	March 12	Chicago Bears
ILB	John Timu	RFA	March 20	Chicago Bears
DE	Mitch Unrein	UFA	March 16	Tampa Bay Buccaneers
WR	Kendall Wright	UFA	March 30	Minnesota Vikings

The Bears entered free agency with 25 free agents, including 19 unrestricted, four restricted, and two exclusive rights free agents.

==== Acquisitions ====
On January 1, the Bears signed wide receivers Demarcus Ayers, Tanner Gentry, and Mekale McKay, offensive linemen Travis Averill and Will Pericak, tight end Colin Thompson, and defensive back Doran Grant to reserve/futures contracts. Nine days later, Montreal Alouettes cornerback Jonathon Mincy signed with the Bears; in 32 games in the Canadian Football League, Mincy recorded 108 tackles with three interceptions and two forced fumbles. He was named to the Eastern Division All-Star team in 2017.

The NFL's legal tampering window, during which teams could negotiate with incoming unrestricted free agents, opened on March 12. During the period, wide receivers Allen Robinson and Taylor Gabriel, tight end Trey Burton, and kicker Cody Parkey expressed their intentions to sign with the Bears. Robinson tore an anterior cruciate ligament in the first game of 2017 with the Jacksonville Jaguars; in the three prior years, he recorded 2,831 receiving yards and 22 touchdowns, and was named to the 2015 Pro Bowl. During the 2017 Atlanta Falcons season, Gabriel caught 33 passes for 378 yards and a touchdown. Burton, who played for the Eagles in 2017, had 23 receptions for 248 yards and five scores. In Super Bowl LII, he threw a touchdown pass to quarterback Nick Foles. Parkey, who worked with Tabor during his tenure with the Browns, converted 21 of 23 field goals with the Miami Dolphins in 2017. The four signings were officially announced on March 14.

When free agency began on March 14, quarterback Chase Daniel signed a two-year deal with the Bears; Daniel worked with Nagy in Kansas City, establishing himself as a liked backup quarterback with the Chiefs and New Orleans Saints. During the so-called second wave of free agency a few days later, the Bears signed defensive end/linebacker Aaron Lynch from the San Francisco 49ers and quarterback Tyler Bray from the Chiefs. Lynch, who played with Fangio in his 2014 rookie season, registered six sacks in his rookie campaign and 12.5 in his first two NFL seasons before a PED suspension and calf injury cut his production the last two years. Bray was Alex Smith's backup in Kansas City under Nagy.

On April 3, Arizona Cardinals guard Earl Watford signed with the Bears, becoming the third ex-Cardinal on Chicago's offensive line alongside Bradley Sowell and Bobby Massie.

==== Departures ====
On February 20, the Bears announced they were releasing linebacker Jerrell Freeman and declining a 2018 option on offensive lineman Josh Sitton; in 2017, Freeman was placed on injured reserve after suffering a torn pectoral muscle in the first game of the year, followed by a ten-game suspension for using performance-enhancing drugs. Sitton missed the last two games of the season with an ankle injury. Six days later, linebacker Pernell McPhee and safety Quintin Demps were cut. McPhee recorded 14 sacks in three seasons with the Bears, but also struggled with injuries. Demps was benched following the emergence of Eddie Jackson and Adrian Amos as the new starters during the 2017 season. Outside linebacker Willie Young, who only played four games in 2017 due to a torn triceps, was released on February 28. Cornerback Marcus Cooper was released on March 14, but was brought back by the team thirteen days later on a one-year contract; he started the first four games of the 2017 season before suffering a back injury and losing his starting spot.

During free agency, various free agents signed with other teams. On March 15, linebacker Christian Jones and kicker Cairo Santos signed with the Detroit Lions and New York Jets, respectively; in 2017, Jones set career highs in tackles (84) and sacks (two) in addition to forcing and recovering a fumble. Santos played two games for the Bears before suffering reaggravating a groin injury. Defensive end Mitch Unrein, who recorded 32 tackles and 2.5 sacks in 2017, was signed by the Tampa Bay Buccaneers on March 16. Andrew DePaola joined the Oakland Raiders for 2018 and became the highest-paid long snapper in the league. On March 22, offensive lineman Tom Compton, who started five games at guard for the Bears in 2017, signed with the Minnesota Vikings, with receiver Kendall Wright doing the same eight days later. In early April, wide receiver and restricted free agent Cameron Meredith was offered a two-year, $10 million contract by the New Orleans Saints, which the Bears elected to not match after five days.

=== NFL draft ===
The Bears entered the draft needing to address positions like linebacker, defensive back, and offensive line. Such positions were suggested in various mock drafts from those like Sean Wagner-McGough of CBSSports.com, Matt Eurich of 247Sports.com, and Lorin Cox of USA Today as they projected Notre Dame guard Quenton Nelson, Florida State defensive back Derwin James, and Boston College linebacker Harold Landry, respectively.

With the eighth-overall pick, the Bears selected Georgia Bulldogs linebacker Roquan Smith, reuniting him with 2016 first-round pick and former Bulldog linebacker Leonard Floyd. In 2017, the Butkus Award winner helped lead Georgia to the 2018 College Football Playoff National Championship. In the second round, Chicago opted to fill the offensive positions as the team drafted Iowa center James Daniels and Memphis receiver Anthony Miller. In 2017, Daniels was honorable mention for the All-Big Ten Conference team as he helped lead an Iowa offense that averaged 190.2 passing yards and 139.2 rushing yards per game. Although he played center in college, the Bears elected to move him to guard to start his NFL career. Miller, whose selection was made possible when the Bears traded up to the 51st-overall pick in a trade with the New England Patriots that sent the 105th overall and a 2019 second rounder to New England, recorded 1,448 receiving yards and 16 touchdowns in the 2016 and 2017 seasons; during the latter, he averaged 3.47 yards per route run, fourth-best among receivers in the draft.

The third and final day of the draft saw rounds four through seven. With their fourth-round pick, the Bears drafted Western Kentucky linebacker Joel Iyiegbuniwe; a Chicago native, Iyiegbuniwe played both inside and outside linebacker in college; in his final season, he had 116 tackles, 11.5 tackles for loss, two forced fumbles, two sacks, and a fumble recovery. The fifth round saw defensive tackle Bilal Nichols of Delaware be selected; a fellow Delaware alumnus like Nagy, Nichols recorded 5.5 sacks and 6.5 tackles for loss in 2017, earning him a spot on the first-team All-Colonial Athletic Association team. Chicago filled the gap at edge rusher by drafting Utah defensive end Kylie Fitts; Fitts struggled with injuries throughout his college career, but racked up 23 tackles, three tackles for loss, three sacks, and a forced fumble in 2017. In the seventh round, the Bears drafted another receiver and Bulldog in Javon Wims; in 2017, Wims led the Bulldogs with 45 catches for 720 yards and seven touchdowns.

After the draft, the Bears signed fifteen undrafted free agents: running back Ryan Nall (Oregon State), wide receivers Garrett Johnson (Kentucky) and Shaq Roland (West Georgia), offensive lineman Dejon Allen (Hawaii), defensive linemen Abdullah Anderson (Bucknell) and Cavon Walker (Maryland), linebackers Nyles Morgan and Andrew Trumbetti (Notre Dame) and Elijah Norris (Shepherd), cornerbacks Michael Joseph (Dubuque) and Kevin Toliver II (LSU), safety Nick Orr (TCU), and punter Ryan Winslow (Pittsburgh).

On May 10, every draft pick minus Smith signed their rookie contracts with the team. Smith's signing was delayed due to a conflict between his agency CAA Football and the Bears. Much of the debate centered on language in the contract dictating whether Smith's guaranteed money would return to the team if he was suspended due to the NFL's new rule outlawing contact leading with the helmet. While CAA argued for a clause that would protect Smith's guaranteed money, the Bears suggested their decisions would be determined by the league's own actions, a situation that was exacerbated by skepticism surrounding the rule and the high frequency of tackles in Smith's role on the field. After missing Training Camp in July and early August, Smith signed a four-year deal with the Bears on August 14.

2018 Chicago Bears draft
Round	Pick	Player	Position	College	Notes
1	8	Roquan Smith *	LB	Georgia	
2	39	James Daniels	C	Iowa	
2	51	Anthony Miller	WR	Memphis	From New England
4	115	Joel Iyiegbuniwe	LB	Western Kentucky	From Arizona
5	145	Bilal Nichols	DT	Delaware	
6	181	Kylie Fitts	DE	Utah	
7	224	Javon Wims	WR	Georgia	
Made roster † Pro Football Hall of Fame * Made at least one Pro Bowl during career

Draft trades

- The Bears traded their third-round selection (70th overall), and their first-, third- and fourth-round selections in 2017 (3rd, 67th, and 111th overall) to San Francisco in exchange for San Francisco's first-round selection in 2017 (2nd overall).
- In 2017, the Bears traded their second-round selection (36th overall) to Arizona in exchange for Arizona's 2018 fourth round selection (115th overall), as well as their 2017 second, fourth, and sixth round selections (45th, 119th, 197th overall).

=== Offseason activities ===
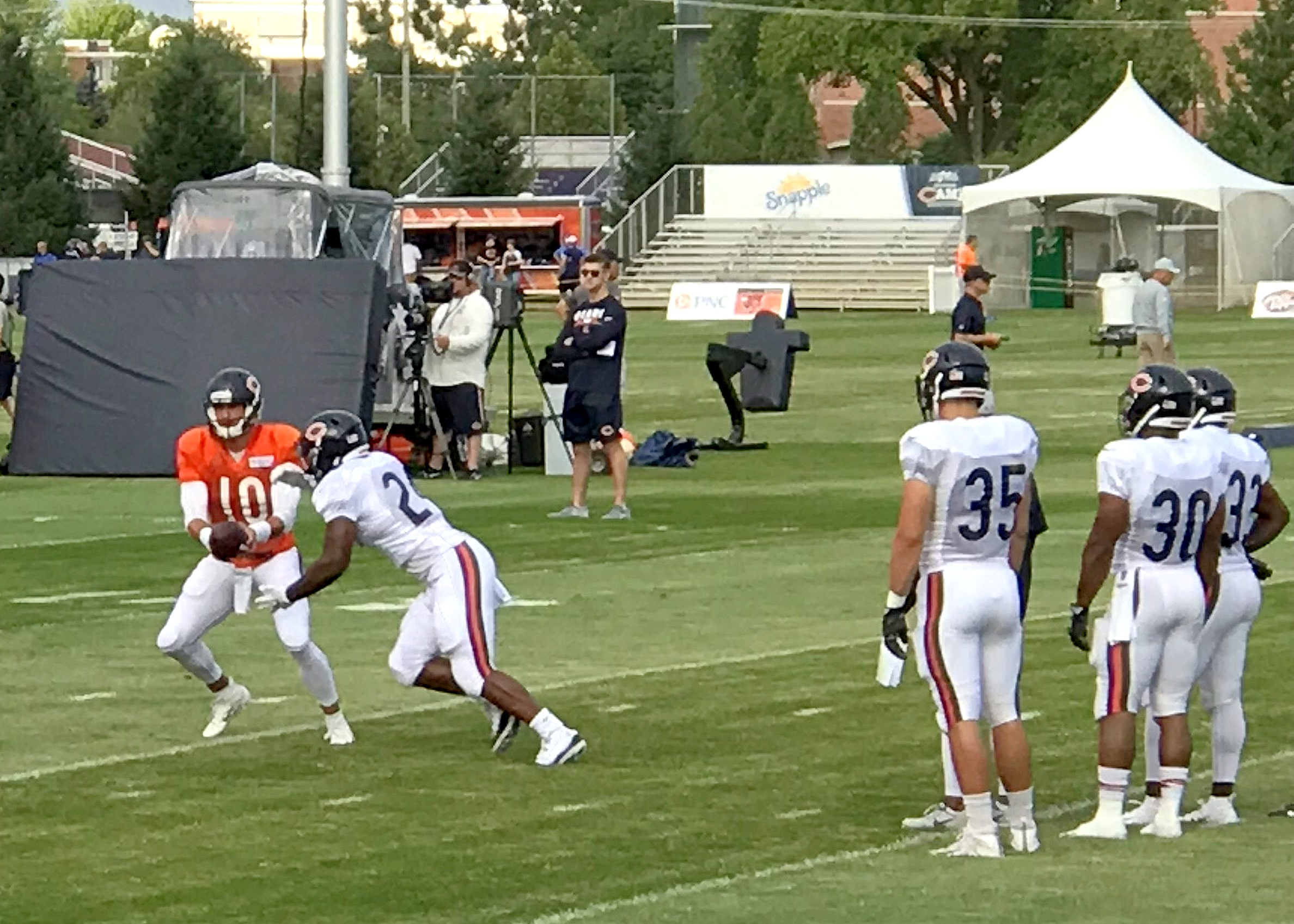
Quarterback Mitchell Trubisky hands off the ball to Jordan Howard during Training Camp

Offseason workouts began on April 3; as the Bears entered the offseason with a new head coach, they were permitted to start workouts earlier than other teams. Also thanks to having a new coach, the team held a voluntary veteran minicamp from April 17–19.

The Bears held a veteran minicamp in late April. After its conclusion, the team released McKay and signed receiver Marlon Brown and defensive end Nick Williams. In 2013, Brown caught 49 passes for 524 yards and seven touchdowns for the Baltimore Ravens, but saw his playing time decrease over time as the receiving corps was bolstered with new players. Williams last played for the Chiefs and Dolphins in 2016.

In May, Rookie Minicamp was held from May 11–13. After its conclusion, the Bears signed five tryout players: wide receiver Matt Fleming, offensive linemen Jeremi Hall and Matt McCants, and defensive backs John Franklin III and Tyrin Holloway. Fleming played football and ran track for Division III school Benedictine University, recording 45 receptions for 731 yards and 10 touchdowns in 2017. Hall started 25 games for the South Florida Bulls in 2016 and 2017, while McCants, a sixth-round draft pick in 2012 by the New York Giants, returned to the Bears after playing for them in 2016. After transferring to Western Illinois for his final season in 2017, Holloway played four games for the Leathernecks and had three interceptions. Franklin, a former quarterback at Florida State, attracted attention when he appeared on the Netflix series Last Chance U during his time at East Mississippi Community College. He later played receiver for Auburn and Florida Atlantic. In conjunction with the signings, the Bears released Averill, Morgan, linebacker Howard Jones, and offensive lineman Cameron Lee.

The Bears conducted ten offseason team activities (OTAs) on May 15–17, May 22–24, and May 29 – June 1. A mandatory minicamp involving the entire roster took place on June 5–7. Linebacker Kasim Edebali, who was attending the camp on a tryout and played for Bears GM Ryan Pace in New Orleans, signed with the team after it ended. Other post-camp transactions included signing linebacker Josh Woods, who went undrafted after playing safety for Maryland from 2014 to 2017, and releasing Holloway and Roland.

Training Camp at Olivet Nazarene University in Bourbonnais began on July 21 and ended on August 11. On August 15, days before their preseason game against each other, the Bears visited Englewood, Colorado for a joint practice with the Broncos.

During camp, the Bears made the following roster moves: on July 23, Hall was released and Florida State linebacker Ro'Derrick Hoskins was signed to take his place; a receiver swap occurred on July 26 when Fleming was waived in favor of Albany Empire player and Arena Football League Offensive Rookie of the Year Malachi Jones; on July 27, defensive end Bunmi Rotimi was released and former Saints offensive lineman Jack Allen was signed; however, Allen was released on August 4 and his roster spot taken by fellow O-lineman Kaleb Johnson, a former Chiefs player; Johnson's slot would also be replaced a week later by Chiefs running back Knile Davis.

== Staff ==
2018 Chicago Bears staff
Front office: Secretary of the board of directors – Virginia Halas McCaskey; Chairman – George McCaskey; President/CEO – Ted Phillips; General manager – Ryan Pace; Vice president & general counsel – Cliff Stein; Director of player personnel – Josh Lucas; Director of college scouting – Mark Sadowski; Director of pro personnel – Champ Kelly; Director of football administration – Joey Laine; Head coaches: Head coach – Matt Nagy; Offensive coaches: Offensive coordinator – Mark Helfrich; Quarterbacks coach – Dave Ragone; Running backs – Charles London; Wide receivers – Mike Furrey; Tight ends – Kevin M. Gilbride; Offensive line – Harry Hiestand; Assistant offensive line – Donovan Raiola; Offensive assistant – Shane Toub; Offensive quality control – Brian Ginn; Offensive quality control – Mike Snyder	Defensive coaches: Defensive coordinator – Vic Fangio; Defensive line – Jay Rodgers; Outside linebackers – Brandon Staley; Inside linebackers – Glenn Pires; Defensive backs – Ed Donatell; Assistant defensive backs – Roy Anderson; Defensive quality control – Bill Shuey; Defensive quality control – Sean Desai; Special teams coaches: Special teams coordinator – Chris Tabor; Assistant special teams – Brock Olivo; Strength and conditioning: Strength and conditioning – Jason Loscalzo; Assistant strength and conditioning – Casey Kramer; Assistant strength and conditioning – Pierre Ngo; Head athletic trainer – Andre Tucker

== Final roster ==
2018 Chicago Bears roster
Quarterbacks (QB): 4 Chase Daniel; 10 Mitchell Trubisky; Running backs (RB): 46 Michael Burton FB; 29 Tarik Cohen; 30 Benny Cunningham; 24 Jordan Howard; 33 Taquan Mizzell; Wide receivers (WR): 15 Josh Bellamy; 18 Taylor Gabriel; 17 Anthony Miller; 12 Allen Robinson; 11 Kevin White; 83 Javon Wims; Tight ends (TE): 84 Ben Braunecker; 85 Daniel Brown; 80 Trey Burton; 87 Adam Shaheen	Offensive linemen (OL): 69 Rashaad Coward T; 68 James Daniels G; 64 Eric Kush G; 72 Charles Leno T; 75 Kyle Long G; 70 Bobby Massie T; 79 Bradley Sowell T; 65 Cody Whitehair C; 78 Bryan Witzmann G; Defensive linemen (DL): 90 Jonathan Bullard DE; 91 Eddie Goldman NT; 96 Akiem Hicks DE; 98 Bilal Nichols DE; 95 Roy Robertson-Harris DE; 97 Nick Williams DE	Linebackers (LB): 49 Kylie Fitts OLB; 94 Leonard Floyd OLB; 47 Isaiah Irving OLB; 45 Joel Iyiegbuniwe ILB; 44 Nick Kwiatkoski ILB; 99 Aaron Lynch OLB; 52 Khalil Mack OLB; 58 Roquan Smith ILB; 59 Danny Trevathan ILB; Defensive backs (DB): 38 Adrian Amos SS; 20 Prince Amukamara CB; 26 Deon Bush FS; 23 Kyle Fuller CB; 36 DeAndre Houston-Carson SS; 39 Eddie Jackson FS; 27 Sherrick McManis CB; 22 Kevin Toliver CB; 31 Marcus Williams CB; Special teams (ST): 16 Pat O'Donnell P; 1 Cody Parkey K; 48 Patrick Scales LS	Practice squad: 62 Dejon Allen G; 76 Abdullah Anderson DE; 63 Willie Beavers G; 43 John Franklin FS; 19 Tanner Gentry WR; 14 Cyril Grayson WR; 21 Michael Joseph CB; 25 Jonathon Mincy CB; 35 Ryan Nall RB; 55 Josh Woods OLB; Reserve: 93 Sam Acho OLB (IR); 37 Bryce Callahan CB (IR); 86 Zach Miller TE (PUP); 88 Dion Sims TE (IR); 48 Andrew Trumbetti OLB (IR); Rookies in italics 53 active, 5 reserve, 10 practice squad

== Preseason ==
On February 13, the NFL announced that the Bears will play the Baltimore Ravens in the Pro Football Hall of Fame Game on Thursday, August 2, at the Tom Benson Hall of Fame Stadium in Canton, Ohio. The remaining preseason games were revealed on April 11.

=== Schedule ===
Week	Date	Opponent	Result	Record	Game site	NFL.com GameBook	NFL.com recap
HOF	August 2	vs. Baltimore Ravens	L 16–17	0–1	Tom Benson Hall of Fame Stadium (Canton, Ohio)	GameBook	Recap
1	August 9	at Cincinnati Bengals	L 27–30	0–2	Paul Brown Stadium	GameBook	Recap
2	August 18	at Denver Broncos	W 24–23	1–2	Broncos Stadium at Mile High	GameBook	Recap
3	August 25	Kansas City Chiefs	W 27–20	2–2	Soldier Field	GameBook	Recap
4	August 30	Buffalo Bills	L 27–28	2–3	Soldier Field	GameBook	Recap

=== Game summaries ===
The Hall of Fame Game began on a poor note when Chase Daniel's pass was intercepted by Chuck Clark, though DeAndre Houston-Carson responded by intercepting a deflected throw from Robert Griffin III, which set up Daniel's four-yard touchdown pass to Michael Burton. The Ravens answered with Griffin's five-yard touchdown throw to Maxx Williams, followed by Kamalei Correa intercepting Daniel and a field goal by Kaare Vedvik to give them the lead. Daniel was substituted for Tyler Bray after the first half; despite the touchdown to Burton, he also had two picks and a passer rating of 38.8. Early in the second half, DeShon Elliott forced Demarcus Ayers to fumble and Baltimore's Bronson Kaufusi recovered. Lamar Jackson eventually threw a seven-yard touchdown to Hayden Hurst. In the fourth quarter, Cody Parkey kicked a 22-yard field goal, followed by Bray completing a ten-yard touchdown to Tanner Gentry. The Bears attempted a two-point conversion, but failed to score and ultimately lost by one point.

With the exception of certain players like Allen Robinson, Taylor Gabriel, and Jordan Howard, Chicago's first-string offense made its preseason debut against the Cincinnati Bengals. Starting quarterback Mitchell Trubisky was present for just eight plays. Defensively, despite a Kyle Fuller interception returned for touchdown and Taquan Mizzell's one-yard touchdown run, the unit also allowed two touchdowns. After being down 23–14 at halftime, the Bears scored 13 unanswered points via two Parkey field goals and Demarcus Ayers' three-yard touchdown run in the fourth quarter. However, Jeff Driskel threw the go-ahead touchdown to Auden Tate with slightly over two minutes left to put the Bengals up 30–27, and Parkey missed the game-tying field goal with 45 seconds remaining.

The Bears rebounded from the two-game losing streak by winning the next two matchups. Against the Denver Broncos, the starting offense saw more playing time, though the game began poorly when Trubisky fumbled in the end zone and was tackled by Bradley Chubb for a Denver safety. The Broncos added three points on Brandon McManus' 26-yard field goal, but the first stringers bounced back on Trubisky's seven-yard touchdown pass to Trey Burton. Denver answered with two consecutive touchdowns, the second of which was set up when Trubisky was intercepted by Justin Simmons. Parkey kicked a 43-yard field goal to make the score 20–10 at halftime. Although McManus converted a 35-yard field goal to increase the margin to 13 points, Daniel led a fourth quarter comeback with two- and twelve-yard touchdown passes to Mizzell and Ben Braunecker, respectively, to win 24–23.

Against his former team in the Chiefs, Matt Nagy elected to bench his starters, a move that was viewed as unusual since the third official week of the preseason is often used by teams to play their first stringers as a dress rehearsal. The second-string offense excelled in its first three drives as it scored on every series: Benny Cunningham scored first on a 13-yard touchdown run, followed by Daniel throwing 29- and seven-yard touchdown passes to Kevin White and Javon Wims. After the first quarter, Daniel maintained a perfect 158.3 quarterback rating, which ended at 149.5 when he was rotated out by halftime when the Bears led 24–10. On defense, the Bears allowed ten points on the Chiefs' first two drives, but eventually prevented them from scoring until the fourth quarter. The Chiefs scored ten additional points and Parkey added a 19-yard field goal as the Bears triumphed 27–20.

In the final game of the preseason against the Buffalo Bills, the Bears saw success throughout the first three quarters as Doran Grant, Ryan Nall, and Knile Davis scored on a 33-yard pick-six and 32- and one-yard touchdown runs, respectively, while Parkey kicked two field goals to put them up 27–3. In the fourth quarter, however, A. J. McCarron led the Bills to 25 unanswered points via three touchdown passes and a touchdown run. With 13 seconds remaining, he threw the game-winning pass to Keith Towbridge. The Bears could not recover and lost 28–27.

=== Transactions ===
During the preseason, the Bears signed former Oregon long snapper Tanner Carew and released Andrew Trumbetti on an injury settlement. Later in the month, Earl Watford was waived.

On September 1, the team made extensive moves to whittle down its roster to 53 players, which included releasing the following players: Ayers, Bray, Carew, Davis, Edebali, Gentry, Grant, Mizzell, Nall, Dejon Allen, Abdullah Anderson, Jonathan Anderson, Rashard Fant, Bennie Fowler III, John Franklin III, Brandon Greene, Ro'Derrick Hoskins, John Jenkins, Garrett Johnson, Malachi Jones, Michael Joseph, Cre'Von LeBlanc, Matt McCants, Johnathon Mincy, Jordan Morgan, Elijah Norris, Nick Orr, Will Pericak, Colin Thompson, John Timu, Cavon Walker, Nick Williams, Ryan Winslow, and Josh Woods.

Marlon Brown and tight end Adam Shaheen were placed on injured reserve on September 1 and 2, respectively. Brown suffered a concussion during the Chiefs game, while Shaheen sprained his right foot/ankle against the Broncos. Per the NFL's injured reserve rules, those on IR may return to playing after the first eight games of the regular season.

On September 2, the Bears traded for decorated Oakland Raiders linebacker and 2016 Defensive Player of the Year Khalil Mack, who held out of training camp and other offseason activities due to a contract dispute. In acquiring Mack, the Bears sent first-round draft picks in 2019 (later used on running back Josh Jacobs) and 2020 (later used on cornerback Damon Arnette), a third-round pick in 2020 (later used on wide receiver Bryan Edwards), and a sixth-round pick in 2019 to Oakland; Chicago also acquired a 2020 second rounder (which was used to take Cole Kmet) and a conditional fifth rounder (eventually a seventh; which they took Arlington Hambright) in the same draft. It is the Bears' first trade involving sending two first rounders since they did so for quarterback Jay Cutler in 2009. Mack and the Bears later agreed to a six-year extension worth $141 million, including a guaranteed $90 million, making him the highest-paid defensive player in NFL history. During the day, center Hroniss Grasu was released and Nick Williams was re-signed.

Following the moves, the practice squad was filled out with ten players: Allen, Anderson, Bray, Gentry, Joseph, Mincy, Mizzell, Nall, Woods, and offensive lineman James Stone.

== Regular season ==
=== Schedule ===
The Bears' 2018 schedule was announced on April 19. The first two games took place in prime time as the Bears played week one on NBC Sunday Night Football and week two on ESPN's Monday Night Football. Weeks ten to twelve saw three consecutive games against NFC North opponents, marking the Bears' first three-game divisional stretch since 2007. The second match of the slate, week eleven against the Vikings, was initially scheduled for Sunday afternoon before being flexed to Sunday Night Football. The following week's game against the Lions was played on Thanksgiving Day, making the Bears the first team since the AFL–NFL merger in 1970 to play a Thursday afternoon game after playing on Sunday night. Through this stretch, they managed to win three division games in a 12-day span. The Bears' week seventeen game against the Vikings was flexed to 3:25 p.m. because of its impact on the playoffs.

Chicago wore its navy blue jerseys in six of the eight home games, along with the away whites in all but one road game. For the week six game against the Miami Dolphins and the week eleven matchup against the Vikings, the Bears wore orange jerseys for the first time since 2011. Week eight against the New York Jets saw the use of the 1940s throwbacks.

Week	Date	Opponent	Result	Record	Game site	NFL.com GameBook	NFL.com recap
1	September 9	at **Green Bay Packers**	**L** 23–24	0–1	Lambeau Field	GameBook	Recap
2	September 17	Seattle Seahawks	**W** 24–17	1–1	Soldier Field	GameBook	Recap
3	September 23	at Arizona Cardinals	**W** 16–14	2–1	State Farm Stadium	GameBook	Recap
4	September 30	Tampa Bay Buccaneers	**W** 48–10	3–1	Soldier Field	GameBook	Recap
5	Bye						
6	October 14	at Miami Dolphins	**L** 28–31 (OT)	3–2	Hard Rock Stadium	GameBook	Recap
7	October 21	New England Patriots	**L** 31–38	3–3	Soldier Field	GameBook	Recap
8	October 28	New York Jets	**W** 24–10	4–3	Soldier Field	GameBook	Recap
9	November 4	at Buffalo Bills	**W** 41–9	5–3	New Era Field	GameBook	Recap
10	November 11	**Detroit Lions**	**W** 34–22	6–3	Soldier Field	GameBook	Recap
11	November 18	**Minnesota Vikings**	**W** 25–20	7–3	Soldier Field	GameBook	Recap
12	November 22	at **Detroit Lions**	**W** 23–16	8–3	Ford Field	GameBook	Recap
13	December 2	at New York Giants	**L** 27–30 (OT)	8–4	MetLife Stadium	GameBook	Recap
14	December 9	Los Angeles Rams	**W** 15–6	9–4	Soldier Field	GameBook	Recap
15	December 16	**Green Bay Packers**	**W** 24–17	10–4	Soldier Field	GameBook	Recap
16	December 23	at San Francisco 49ers	**W** 14–9	11–4	Levi's Stadium	GameBook	Recap
17	December 30	at **Minnesota Vikings**	**W** 24–10	12–4	U.S. Bank Stadium	GameBook	Recap
Note: Intra-division opponents are in **bold** text. Legend: # Games played with color uniforms. # Games played with white uniforms. # Games played with alternate orange uniforms. # Game played with 1940s throwback uniforms. – Light green background indicates a victory. – Light red background indicates a loss.

=== Game summaries ===
==== Week 1: at Green Bay Packers ====
Week One: Chicago Bears at Green Bay Packers – Game summary

Quarter	1	2	3	4	Total
Bears	7	10	3	3	**23**
**Packers**	0	0	3	21	**24**

at Lambeau Field, Green Bay, Wisconsin

- Date: September 9
- Game time: 7:20 p.m. CDT
- Game weather: 62 °F (17 °C), clear
- Game attendance: 78,282
- Referee: Carl Cheffers
- TV announcers (NBC): Al Michaels, Cris Collinsworth, Michele Tafoya, and Terry McAulay
- Recap, Gamebook

Game information

First quarter

- CHI – Mitchell Trubisky 2-yard run (Cody Parkey kick), 7:16. Bears 7–0. **Drive: 10 plays, 86 yards, 6:02.**

Second quarter

- CHI – Cody Parkey 26-yard field goal, 15:00. Bears 10–0. **Drive: 9 plays, 60 yards, 4:17.**
- CHI – Khalil Mack 27-yard interception return (Cody Parkey kick), 0:39. Bears 17–0.

Third quarter

- CHI – Cody Parkey 33-yard field goal, 9:18. Bears 20–0. **Drive: 12 plays, 60 yards, 5:46.**
- GB – Mason Crosby 42 -yard field goal, 3:41. Bears 20–3. **Drive: 12 plays, 46 yards, 5:37.**

Fourth quarter

- GB – Geronimo Allison 39-yard pass from Aaron Rodgers (Mason Crosby kick), 14:06. Bears 20–10. **Drive: 8 plays, 81 yards, 2:55.**
- GB – Davante Adams 12-yard pass from Aaron Rodgers (Mason Crosby kick), 9:10. Bears 20–17. **Drive: 5 plays, 75 yards, 2:51.**
- CHI – Cody Parkey 32-yard field goal, 2:42. Bears 23–17. **Drive: 14 plays, 61 yards, 6:22.**
- GB – Randall Cobb 75-yard pass from Aaron Rodgers (Mason Crosby kick), 2:29. Packers 24–23. **Drive: 3 plays, 75 yards, 0:26.**

Top passers

- CHI – Mitchell Trubisky – 23/35, 171 yards
- GB – Aaron Rodgers – 20/30, 286 yards, 3 TD

Top rushers

- CHI – Jordan Howard – 15 rushes, 82 yards
- GB – Jamaal Williams – 15 rushes, 47 yards

Top receivers

- CHI – Taylor Gabriel – 5 receptions, 25 yards
- GB – Randall Cobb – 9 receptions, 142 yards, TD

In the first game of the 2018 regular season, the Bears visited Lambeau Field to take on the longtime rival Green Bay Packers. Entering the game, the Packers led the all-time series 96–94–6, with the Packers having won all but three games since 2010. Leading up to the game, Matt Nagy announced the team would not have permanent team captains and instead opt for a rotating weekly system consisting of three players (one from the offense, defense, and special teams apiece), which was previously used by Nagy in Kansas City. As such, Mitchell Trubisky, defensive end Akiem Hicks, and running back/special teamer Benny Cunningham were named week one's captains.

After the Packers punted on the first drive, the Bears opened the Nagy era by running the T formation with their first offensive play; the formation was made famous by team founder and longtime head coach George Halas during the 1930s and 1940s, while the play itself was nicknamed "Papa Bear Left" in honor of him. Chicago eventually scored on a two-yard touchdown run by Trubisky to cap off an 86-yard series. Chicago continued its momentum with Cody Parkey's 26-yard field goal after another Packers punt in the second quarter. During the quarter, Packers quarterback Aaron Rodgers suffered a knee injury and was replaced by DeShone Kizer, who lost a fumble to newly acquired linebacker Khalil Mack while inside the Bears' ten-yard line; Mack also intercepted Kizer's pass and returned it for a 27-yard touchdown to put the Bears up 17–0 at halftime, the team's biggest advantage at Lambeau during the Brett Favre/Rodgers era. Chicago increased the advantage to 20–0 with Parkey's 33-yard field goal. Rodgers returned shortly after, during which Mason Crosby kicked a 42-yard field goal. The Bears offense failed to score for the rest of the game as every drive ended with a punt minus a 32-yard field goal in the fourth quarter, while Rodgers threw touchdown passes of 39, 12, and 75 yards to Geronimo Allison, Davante Adams, and Randall Cobb, respectively. The touchdown to Cobb followed a near-interception by Fuller, who dropped the pass. With the score, Green Bay was up 24–23 with 2:13 left in the game. Although Trubisky led the offense into Packers territory, he was sacked by Nick Perry on fourth down and fumbled, losing the ball to Kenny Clark.

It is the fifth consecutive week one loss for the Bears and the tenth straight NFC North defeat. After leading by 20 points, the defeat is the second-largest blown lead in team history and the third such instance (the Bears also lost to the 1992 Minnesota Vikings and 2002 New Orleans Saints despite maintaining 20-point advantages in both games). In spite of the defeat, positives included Roquan Smith sacking Kizer on his first career NFL snap, fewer penalties than usual (five for 35 yards; in their last four games in Green Bay, the Bears averaged ten penalties for 106 yards), and a lack of turnovers allowed. Offensive lineman Bobby Massie stated, "There's a lot of things we did well. Nobody gave us a chance in that game. Just corrections that need to be made. We've got to finish stronger and things won't be a problem."

==== Week 2: vs. Seattle Seahawks ====
Week Two: Seattle Seahawks at Chicago Bears – Game summary

Quarter	1	2	3	4	Total
Seahawks	0	3	0	14	**17**
**Bears**	7	3	0	14	**24**

at Soldier Field, Chicago, Illinois

- Date: September 17
- Game time: 7:15 p.m. CDT
- Game weather: 79 °F (26 °C), clear
- Game attendance: 57,960
- Referee: Walt Coleman
- TV announcers (ESPN/WLS): Joe Tessitore, Jason Witten, Booger McFarland, and Lisa Salters
- Recap, Gamebook

Game information

**First quarter**

- CHI – Trey Burton 3-yard pass from Mitchell Trubisky (Cody Parkey kick), 4:55. Bears 7–0. **Drive: 10 plays, 96 yards, 5:40.**

**Second quarter**

- CHI – Cody Parkey 25-yard field goal, 1:07. Bears 10–0. **Drive: 12 plays, 44 yards, 5:26.**
- SEA – Sebastian Janikowski 56-yard field goal, 0:00. Bears 10–3. **Drive: 8 plays, 37 yards, 1:07.**

**Third quarter**

- No scoring plays.

**Fourth quarter**

- CHI – Anthony Miller 10-yard pass from Mitchell Trubisky (Cody Parkey kick), 14:15. Bears 17–3. **Drive: 11 plays, 66 yards, 6:15.**
- SEA – Tyler Lockett 19-yard pass from Russell Wilson (Sebastian Janikowski kick), 10:13. Bears 17–10. **Drive: 10 plays, 75 yards, 4:02.**
- CHI – Prince Amukamara 49-yard interception return (Cody Parkey kick), 6:37. Bears 24–10.
- SEA – Will Dissly 2-yard pass from Russell Wilson (Sebastian Janikowski kick), 0:14. Bears 24–17. **Drive: 11 plays, 99 yards, 2:28.**

**Top passers**

- SEA – Russell Wilson – 22/36, 226 yards, 2 TD, 1 INT
- CHI – Mitchell Trubisky – 25/34, 200 yards, 2 TD, 2 INT

**Top rushers**

- SEA – Rashaad Penny – 10 carries, 30 yards
- CHI – Jordan Howard – 14 carries, 35 yards

**Top receivers**

- SEA – Tyler Lockett – 5 receptions, 60 yards, 1 TD
- CHI – Allen Robinson – 10 receptions, 83 yards

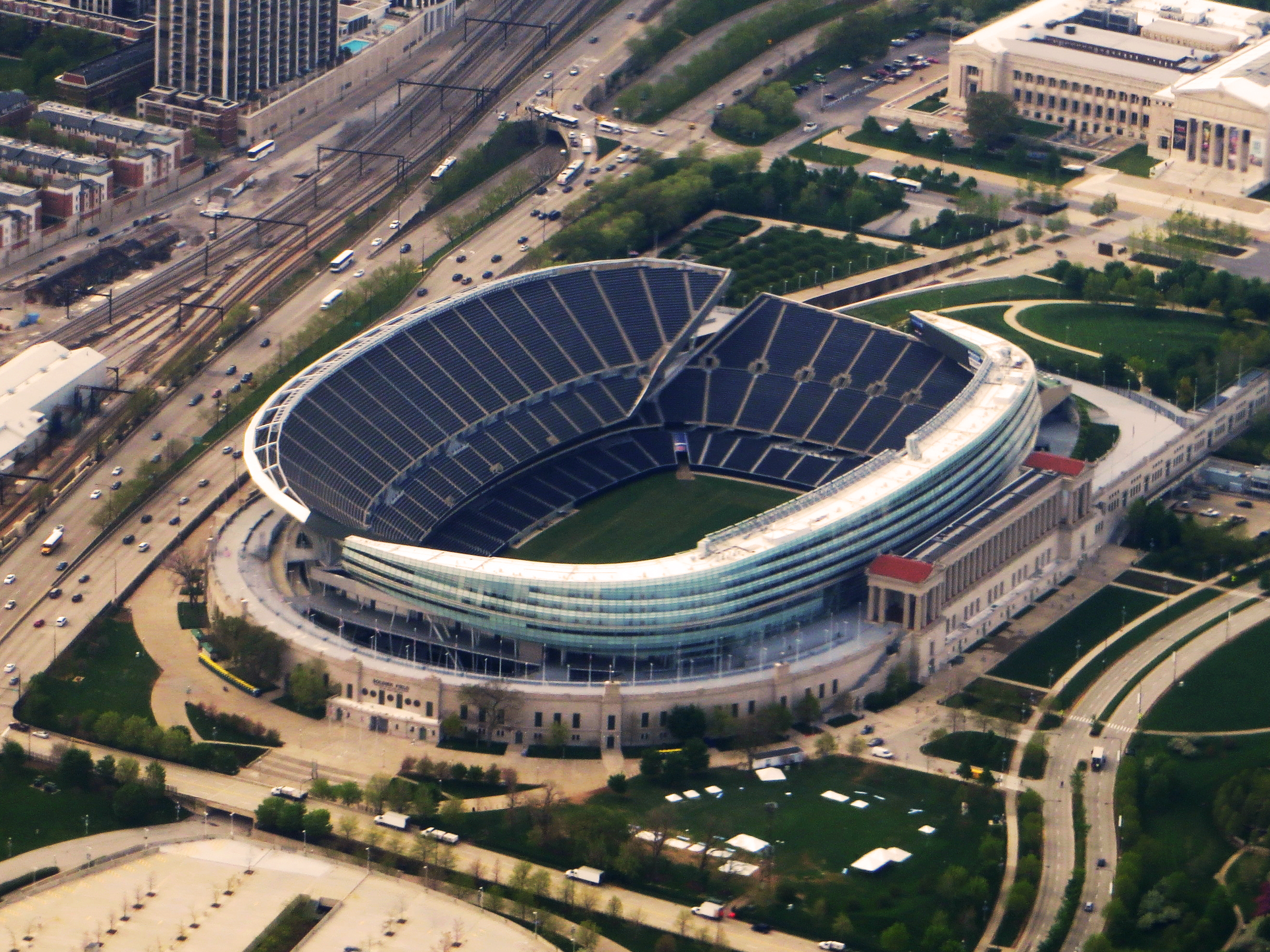
The Bears played every home game at Soldier Field.

Hoping to rebound from the loss in Green Bay, the Bears hosted the 0–1 Seattle Seahawks on Monday Night Football in week two. In 17 all-time games between the two, Seattle led the series 11–6, including winning the last four regular season meetings. Despite the result of the Packers game, history showed optimism for the Seahawks matchup as the Bears were 7–1 in the first game after a loss to Rodgers at Lambeau Field. Although mobile Seahawks quarterback Russell Wilson led the NFL in passing touchdowns in 2017, he struggled in week one against the Broncos as he threw two interceptions, was sacked six times, and had just five rushing yards. Furthermore, he lost receiver Doug Baldwin to a knee injury, making the run game more crucial. With the exception of veteran safety Earl Thomas, Seattle's defense was inexperienced and struggled against Denver; in his game preview, Sports Illustrated writer Andy Benoit expected the Seahawks to suffer difficulties against a misdirection-based Bears offense. Predicting a Bears victory, Benoit added that while Wilson will have over 50 rushing yards, the Seattle offense will be restricted to below 300 total yards. Running back Jordan Howard, nose tackle Eddie Goldman, and tight end/special teams player Ben Braunecker represented the Bears as team captains.

After the Seahawks punted on the opening drive, the Bears once again scored on their first possession as Trubisky engineered a 96-yard drive that ended with a two-yard shovel pass touchdown to Trey Burton. Despite the early success, the quarterback struggled in the second quarter as he was intercepted on two consecutive drives, both by Shaquill Griffin, though the Seahawks could not capitalize as they were forced to punt on every ensuing series. On one drive, Wilson fumbled after Mack stripped him on third down. By halftime, both teams added field goals on their last drives (Parkey making a 25 yarder, Sebastian Janikowski converting a 56 yarder on the final play of the first half). After a scoreless third quarter, Trubisky threw a ten-yard touchdown pass to Anthony Miller to increase the advantage to 14 points. Although the margin returned to one score after Wilson completed a 19-yard touchdown to Tyler Lockett, the Bears scored again when Prince Amukamara intercepted Wilson's pass and returned it 49 yards for a touchdown. On the Seahawks' next drive, Danny Trevathan sacked Wilson, who lost the ball and it was recovered by the Bears' Leonard Floyd. The Bears punted, followed by the Seahawks completing a 99-yard series with Wilson's two-yard touchdown pass to Will Dissly with 14 seconds remaining in the game. Miller recovered the onside kick to secure the 24–17 win.

The defense ended the day with six sacks on Wilson from five players. Including the four sacks against Green Bay, the Bears had a league-high ten sacks after two games. "Our theme this game was to play all four quarters and finish. I'm so glad that this was a team win and we got that bad taste out of our mouth last week," Amukamara said.

==== Week 3: at Arizona Cardinals ====
Week Three: Chicago Bears at Arizona Cardinals – Game summary

Quarter	1	2	3	4	Total
**Bears**	0	3	10	3	**16**
Cardinals	14	0	0	0	**14**

at State Farm Stadium, Glendale, Arizona

- Date: September 23
- Game time: 3:25 p.m. CDT/1:25 p.m. MST
- Game weather: Played indoors (retractable roof closed)
- Game attendance: 62,163
- Referee: Bill Vinovich
- TV announcers (Fox): Dick Stockton, Mark Schlereth, and Jennifer Hale
- Recap, Gamebook

Game information

**First quarter**

- ARI – Ricky Seals-Jones 35-yard pass from Sam Bradford (Phil Dawson kick), 12:12. Cardinals 7–0. **Drive: 5 plays, 75 yards, 2:48.**
- ARI – David Johnson 21-yard pass from Sam Bradford (Phil Dawson kick), 1:40. Cardinals 14–0. **Drive: 1 plays, 21 yards, 0:06.**

**Second quarter**

- CHI – Cody Parkey 20-yard field goal, 1:54. Cardinals 14–3. **Drive: 11 plays, 71 yards, 5:27.**

**Third quarter**

- CHI – Jordan Howard 1-yard run (Cody Parkey kick), 6:16. Cardinals 14–10. **Drive: 9 plays, 67 yards, 4:30.**
- CHI – Cody Parkey 41-yard field goal, 0:44. Cardinals 14–13. **Drive: 7 plays, 21 yards, 2:54.**

**Fourth quarter**

- CHI – Cody Parkey 43-yard field goal, 4:31. Bears 16–14. **Drive: 13 plays, 59 yards, 6:52.**

**Top passers**

- CHI – Mitchell Trubisky – 24/35, 220 yards, 1 INT
- ARI – Sam Bradford – 13/19, 157 yards, 2 TD, 2 INT

**Top rushers**

- CHI – Jordan Howard – 24 carries, 61 yards, 1 TD
- ARI – David Johnson – 12 carries, 31 yards

**Top receivers**

- CHI – Taylor Gabriel – 6 receptions, 34 yards
- ARI – Christian Kirk – 7 receptions, 90 yards

In week three, the Bears battled the Cardinals in State Farm Stadium for the first time since 2012, a game that ended in a 28–13 Bears victory. While the Cardinals won the latest game between the two in 2015 (a 48–23 win in Chicago), the Bears were victorious in the last two regular season games in Arizona. In the teams' historic meetings dating back to 1920, the Bears led the all-time series 58–28–6. To begin the 2018 season, the Cardinals struggled mightily on offense, especially in the first half: across the first two quarters of both games, they were outscored 40–0, had an NFL-worst 96 rushing yards on 32 carries for an average of 3 yards, and never crossed the 50-yard line into opposing territory. In contrast, the Bears' first-half team had 27 points against just 3 points allowed, while the defense allowed 150 yards on 56 plays (average of 2.7 yards), the lowest in the league. On the opposite side, Arizona's defense saw the return of defensive end Markus Golden from an ACL injury in 2017, who – along with Chandler Jones – assisted the Cardinals in recording the most sacks in 2016. In Golden's absence, Jones had an NFL-high 17.5 sacks in 2017, a situation that Chicago Sun-Times writer Mark Potash pointed out would prove a challenge for the Bears' tackles in their effort to protect Trubisky. Massie, Amukamara, and linebacker/special teamer Sam Acho were named team captains; Massie and Acho were former Cardinals, while Amukamara is an Arizona native.

In contrast to their first half woes in the first two games of 2018, the Cardinals opened the game by scoring on a five-play, 75-yard drive that ended with Sam Bradford's 35-yard touchdown pass to Ricky Seals-Jones. The Bears attempted to respond by driving to the Cardinals' 13-yard line, but Trubisky was sacked for a 15-yard loss and Parkey missed a 46-yard field goal wide right. On Chicago's next drive, Trubisky was sacked by Robert Nkemdiche and fumbled, losing the ball to Corey Peters. On the first play of the ensuing drive, Bradford threw a 21-yard touchdown pass to David Johnson to make the score 14–0 after one quarter; it was double the points scored by the Cardinals in weeks one and two combined. The Bears responded with a 71-yard series that reached the Cardinals' two-yard line, where Parkey kicked a 20-yard field goal. Trubisky's troubles continued when he was intercepted by Tre Boston on the Bears' penultimate play of the first half. After the Bears punted on the first drive of the second half, the defense forced Bradford to commit three consecutive turnovers that the offense capitalized on with scoring drives: Bradford was intercepted by Eddie Jackson and Howard scored on a one-yard touchdown run, he threw another interception to Sherrick McManis which led to Parkey's 41-yard field goal, he fumbled after being stripped by Mack and the fumble was recovered by Trevathan to set up Parkey's go-ahead 43-yard field goal and make the score 16–14 in favor of Chicago. With four minutes remaining, backup rookie quarterback Josh Rosen relieved Bradford. Although he led the Arizona offense into Chicago territory, his pass for Christian Kirk was intercepted by Bryce Callahan. The Bears punted, but three straight runs forced the Cardinals to use all three timeouts as they got the ball back with 43 seconds left in the game. On the second play of the following possession, Rosen was picked off by Jackson, who returned the interception for a 35-yard touchdown before an offsides penalty on Mack nullified the score. Two plays later, Rosen was sacked by McManis to seal the win.

With the win, Chicago improved to 2–1, their first winning record since 2014. As the Packers and Vikings lost their respective games, the Bears also took over the NFC North lead for the first time since 2013.

==== Week 4: vs. Tampa Bay Buccaneers ====
Week Four: Tampa Bay Buccaneers at Chicago Bears – Game summary

Quarter	1	2	3	4	Total
Buccaneers	0	3	0	7	**10**
**Bears**	14	24	7	3	**48**

at Soldier Field, Chicago, Illinois

- Date: September 30
- Game time: 12:00 p.m. CDT
- Game weather: 66 °F (19 °C), cloudy
- Game attendance: 61,893
- Referee: Jerome Boger
- TV announcers (Fox): Thom Brennaman, Chris Spielman, and Shannon Spake
- Recap, Gamebook

Game information

**First quarter**

- CHI – Trey Burton 39-yard pass from Mitchell Trubisky (Cody Parkey kick), 12:27. Bears 7–0. **Drive: 6 plays, 75 yards, 2:40.**
- CHI – Allen Robinson 14-yard pass from Mitchell Trubisky (Cody Parkey kick), 2:18. Bears 14–0. **Drive: 7 plays, 73 yards, 3:34.**

**Second quarter**

- TB – Chandler Catanzaro 30-yard field goal, 15:00. Bears 14–3. **Drive: 6 plays, 60 yards, 2:16.**
- CHI – Tarik Cohen 9-yard pass from Mitchell Trubisky (Cody Parkey kick), 12:26. Bears 21–3. **Drive: 4 plays, 77 yards, 2:34.**
- CHI – Josh Bellamy 20-yard pass from Mitchell Trubisky (Cody Parkey kick), 9:05. Bears 28–3. **Drive: 4 plays, 73 yards, 1:46.**
- CHI – Taylor Gabriel 3-yard pass from Mitchell Trubisky (Cody Parkey kick), 5:00. Bears 35–3. **Drive: 6 plays, 70 yards, 3:12.**
- CHI – Cody Parkey 50-yard field goal, 0:03. Bears 38–3. **Drive: 10 plays, 59 yards, 2:17.**

**Third quarter**

- CHI – Taylor Gabriel 3-yard pass from Mitchell Trubisky (Cody Parkey kick), 10:32. Bears 45–3. **Drive: 4 plays, 60 yards, 0:37.**

**Fourth quarter**

- TB – Cameron Brate 16-yard pass from Jameis Winston (Chandler Catanzaro kick), 13:36. Bears 45–10. **Drive: 11 plays, 79 yards, 5:34.**
- CHI – Cody Parkey 46-yard field goal, 6:28. Bears 48–10. **Drive: 11 plays, 47 yards, 7:07.**

**Top passers**

- TB – Jameis Winston – 16/20, 145 yards, TD, 2 INT
- CHI – Mitchell Trubisky – 19/26, 354 yards, 6 TD

**Top rushers**

- TB – Ronald Jones – 10 rushes, 29 yards
- CHI – Tarik Cohen – 13 rushes, 53 yards

**Top receivers**

- TB – DeSean Jackson – 5 receptions, 112 yards
- CHI – Tarik Cohen – 7 receptions, 121 yards, TD

In week four, the Tampa Bay Buccaneers entered Soldier Field with a 2–1 record. In 58 total meetings since 1977, the Bears led the all-time series 38–20, but lost by more than 20 points in their last two games. On the other hand, the Bears won the last game between the two in Chicago in 2014. Although regular starting quarterback Jameis Winston was returning from a three-game suspension, the Buccaneers gave the start against the Bears to backup Ryan Fitzpatrick, who excelled in the first three games as he threw for over 1,200 yards with 11 touchdowns and a 124.8 passer rating. He also threw for over 400 yards in all three games, becoming the first quarterback in NFL history to have such a streak. However, a poor showing against the Pittsburgh Steelers in week three nearly resulted in his benching, implying he was "on a short leash" for the Chicago game. While the Bears defense had been successful so far, they were without cornerbacks Prince Amukamara and Marcus Cooper due to hamstring injuries, while Tampa Bay receivers Mike Evans, DeSean Jackson, and Chris Godwin had a combined 63 catches for 850 yards and nine touchdowns in 2018. As a whole, the Buccaneers offense led the league in total and passing yards, while also averaging 34 points per game. For Chicago's offense, it faced a Tampa Bay defense that was ranked 29th in yards per pass play (7.9), but allowed just 3.6 yards per rushing play and only one rush of at least 25 yards. NBC Sports Chicago writer JJ Stankevitz stressed the importance of success in the red zone; although the Bears were 27th in red zone touchdown percentage with 40 percent, the Buccaneers allowed 88.9 percent of red zone plays to result in touchdowns. Burton, Jackson, and McManis were the Bears' captains.

"I have been here a while and I've never been part of a win like this. It feels really good to sit in here with a smile on my face. For the last five, six years, I've been saying, 'We're getting better, we're getting better, we're young, we're gonna get there.' [...] Now you guys get to see what I'm seeing."
"The secret's out. We play good football. And when we get rolling, our confidence level gets high."

— Bears guard Kyle Long

The Bears scored quickly as Trubisky recorded a 23-yard run that set up a 39-yard touchdown pass to Burton on the opening drive. After three drives ended in punts, Trubisky threw a 14-yard touchdown to Allen Robinson. Chandler Catanzaro kicked a 30-yard field goal to start the second quarter, but Trubisky and the Bears answered with three straight unanswered touchdowns through the air of 9, 20, and 3 yards to Tarik Cohen, Josh Bellamy, and Taylor Gabriel. The final score saw a trick play that featured Daniel lining up beside Trubisky in the backfield, with Trubisky pitching the ball forward to Gabriel before faking the hand-off to Daniel. The play, nicknamed "Willy Wonka", had been devised by Nagy and the two quarterbacks. On Tampa Bay's final drive for the first half, despite a 42-yard completion to Jackson, Fitzpatrick was intercepted by Jackson. The Bears closed out the half with Parkey's 50-yard field goal. Fitzpatrick was pulled for Winston to start the second half, but Winston threw an interception of his own to Trevathan. Trubisky took advantage of the takeaway with his sixth touchdown pass of the game, another three-yard pass to Gabriel, making the score 45–3. Early in the fourth quarter, Winston threw a 16-yard touchdown pass to Cameron Brate, though Parkey converted a 46-yard kick to increase the margin to 38 points. Mack eventually tipped Winston's pass and Aaron Lynch intercepted it; Daniel kneeled twice to end the game.

It was the Bears' first three-game win streak since 2013 as the team improved to 3–1. The 48 points scored were the most by the Bears since they recorded 51 against the Tennessee Titans in 2012, while the 38-point difference is the largest since a 41–3 victory over the Jacksonville Jaguars that same year. Trubisky recorded a career-high 354 passing yards, six touchdown passes, and a 154.6 rating. The touchdown passes are the second-most in Bears history, one short of the record set by Sid Luckman in 1943. With his five touchdowns in the first half, Trubisky became the first Bears quarterback to accomplish the feat since Johnny Lujack in 1949, while also becoming the second player in NFL history to do so to five different receivers since Rodgers did it against the Bears in 2014. Each of the offense's first five touchdown drives lasted no more than 3:34. After the game, Trubisky stated, "Hopefully, this will be something I can look back on and say, 'This is where it all started.'"

==== Week 5: Bye week ====
Entering the bye week, the Bears had a 3–1 record at the top of the NFC North. Unlike previous Bears regimes, Nagy provided the team with a week off before returning to practice for week six, an approach used by former boss and Chiefs head coach Andy Reid.

At the break, the fourth-ranked defense led the league in sacks (18) and ranked second in turnovers forced (11), while the eight interceptions recorded (by seven different players) tied the Bears' totals across each season from 2015 to 2017. Along with the Tennessee Titans, the Bears defense had yet to allow a rushing touchdown.

During the week, the Bears placed Acho on injured reserve after he tore a pectoral muscle in week four. To take his roster slot, the team signed offensive lineman Bryan Witzmann on October 8; Witzmann started 13 games for the Chiefs in 2017 and had been with the Vikings until his release three days prior.

==== Week 6: at Miami Dolphins ====
Week Six: Chicago Bears at Miami Dolphins – Game summary

Quarter	1	2	3	4	OT	Total
Bears	0	0	21	7	0	**28**
**Dolphins**	7	0	6	15	3	**31**

at Hard Rock Stadium, Miami Gardens, Florida

- Date: October 14
- Game time: 1:00 p.m. EDT/12:00 p.m. CDT
- Game weather: 89 °F (32 °C), partly cloudy
- Game attendance: 65,791
- Referee: Walt Anderson
- TV announcers (Fox): Brian Custer, Greg Jennings, and Doug Gottlieb
- Recap, Gamebook

Game information

**First quarter**

- MIA – Nick O'Leary 5-yard pass from Brock Osweiler (Jason Sanders kick), 8:42. Dolphins 7–0. **Drive: 7 plays, 54 yards, 3:39.**

**Second quarter**

- No scoring plays.

**Third quarter**

- CHI – Trey Burton 9-yard pass from Mitchell Trubisky (Cody Parkey kick), 13:27. Tied 7–7. **Drive: 3 plays, 75 yards, 1:37.**
- CHI – Allen Robinson 12-yard pass from Mitchell Trubisky (Cody Parkey kick), 11:33. Bears 14–7. **Drive: 1 play, 12 yards, 0:05.**
- MIA – Jason Sanders 50-yard field goal, 7:55. Bears 14–10. **Drive: 8 plays, 43 yards, 3:38.**
- CHI – Tarik Cohen 21-yard run (Cody Parkey kick), 6:55. Bears 21–10. **Drive: 3 plays, 75 yards, 1:00.**
- MIA – Jason Sanders 25-yard field goal, 0:30. Bears 21–13. **Drive: 11 plays, 68 yards, 6:25.**

**Fourth quarter**

- MIA – Albert Wilson 43-yard pass from Brock Osweiler (Brock Osweiler-Kenny Stills pass), 9:19. Tied 21–21. **Drive: 6 plays, 80 yards, 3:05.**
- CHI – Anthony Miller 29-yard pass from Mitchell Trubisky (Cody Parkey kick), 3:23. Bears 28–21. **Drive: 11 plays, 75 yards, 5:51.**
- MIA – Albert Wilson 75-yard pass from Brock Osweiler (Jason Sanders kick), 3:17. Tied 28–28. **Drive: 1 play, 75 yards, 0:16.**

**Overtime**

- MIA – Jason Sanders 47-yard field goal, 0:03. Dolphins 31–28. **Drive: 6 plays, 28 yards, 1:55.**

**Top passers**

- CHI – Mitchell Trubisky – 22/31, 316 yards, 3 TD, INT
- MIA – Brock Osweiler – 28/44, 380 yards, 3 TD, 2 INT

**Top rushers**

- CHI – Jordan Howard – 14 rushes, 69 yards
- MIA – Frank Gore – 15 rushes, 101 yards

**Top receivers**

- CHI – Taylor Gabriel – 5 receptions, 110 yards
- MIA – Albert Wilson – 6 receptions, 155 yards, 2 TD

Donning the orange jerseys, the Bears visited Miami to play the 3–2 Dolphins, in the first of four consecutive games against the AFC East. In 12 all-time games, the Dolphins led the series 8–4, including winning their latest meeting in 2014, though the Bears won the last game in Miami in 2010. Hours before the game, the Dolphins announced starting quarterback Ryan Tannehill would miss the contest with a shoulder injury and was replaced by Brock Osweiler. Osweiler won both of his career starts against the Bears with the Denver Broncos and Houston Texans in 2015 and 2016, respectively. The Dolphins were also playing sans defensive end Cameron Wake; with Miller and Amukamara returning from their injuries, Lorin Cox described the game as having "the potential to go quite poorly for Miami." Cohen, Trevathan, and Bellamy were the team captains.

After two drives that ended with punts, the Dolphins capitalized on two Bears penalties as Osweiler threw a five-yard touchdown pass to Nick O'Leary. The Bears' next drive ended when Cohen was stopped on fourth and one. In the second quarter, the Bears attempted to score from the Dolphins' one-yard line, but Howard fumbled after bumping into Burton and Kiko Alonso recovered. On the ensuing drive, however, Osweiler's deep pass was intercepted by Fuller. Trubisky kneeled to end the half with the Bears trailing 7–0. In the second half, the Bears opened with three consecutive scoring drives as Trubisky threw a nine-yard shovel pass touchdown to Burton, followed by a 12-yard touchdown to Robinson after Fuller recorded another interception, and Cohen scored on a 21-yard run. Jason Sanders kicked 50- and 25-yard field goals to give the Dolphins six points in the third quarter. During Chicago's next series, Trubisky completed a 50-yard pass to Cohen and guided the offense to the Dolphins' three-yard line, where he threw a touchdown pass to Cohen. However, Burton was penalized for offensive pass interference and pushed the team back ten yards. On the next play, Trubisky's pass for Braunecker was intercepted by T. J. McDonald. Miami mounted an 80-yard drive that concluded when Osweiler threw a screen to Albert Wilson, who ran 43 yards for the touchdown; Kenny Stills caught Osweiler's pass on the two-point conversion to tie the game. The Bears responded with Trubisky's 29-yard touchdown to Miller, to which the Dolphins struck on one play as Wilson scored on a 75-yard touchdown reception. With two minutes left in regulation, Cohen lost a fumble on the Bears' 32, but the Dolphins punted. After a kneel, overtime began. On Miami's first drive, they reached Chicago's one-yard line before Kenyan Drake was stripped by Hicks and Goldman recovered the loose ball. The Bears reached the Dolphins' 35-yard line, but Parkey's 53-yard field goal went wide right. Sanders scored the game winner on a 47-yard kick as time expired.

Despite the unit's success at the start of the season, the Bears defense struggled against the Dolphins. After recording 18 sacks and allowing of 294.5 yards per game in weeks one through four, the defense failed to sack Osweiler and surrendered 541 yards; Osweiler also threw for a career-best 380 passing yards. Jackson attributed the defense's struggles to the weather and various errors; he commented, "This wasn't Chicago Bears-style defense we're used to playing. We knew it was going to be hot, we knew it was going to be a tough one. We made a lot of mistakes that we've got to come in and correct."

==== Week 7: vs. New England Patriots ====
Week Seven: New England Patriots at Chicago Bears – Game summary

Quarter	1	2	3	4	Total
**Patriots**	7	14	10	7	**38**
Bears	10	7	7	7	**31**

at Soldier Field, Chicago, Illinois

- Date: October 21
- Game time: 12:00 p.m. CDT
- Game weather: 44 °F (7 °C), sunny
- Game attendance: 62,389
- Referee: Clay Martin
- TV announcers (CBS): Ian Eagle, Dan Fouts, and Evan Washburn
- Recap, Gamebook

Game information

**First quarter**

- NE – Julian Edelman 9-yard pass from Tom Brady (Stephen Gostkowski kick), 11:00. Patriots 7–0. **Drive: 8 plays, 75 yards, 4:00.**
- CHI – Cody Parkey 46-yard field goal, 3:50. Patriots 7–3. **Drive: 8 plays, 35 yards, 3:44.**
- CHI – Mitchell Trubisky 8-yard run (Cody Parkey kick), 0:59. Bears 10–7. **Drive: 5 plays, 24 yards, 2:45.**

**Second quarter**

- CHI – Jordan Howard 2-yard run (Cody Parkey kick), 11:05. Bears 17–7. **Drive: 9 plays, 36 yards, 3:46.**
- NE – Cordarrelle Patterson 95-yard kickoff return (Stephen Gostkowski kick), 10:48. Bears 17–14. **Drive: 0 plays, 0 yards, 0:17.**
- NE – James White 5-yard pass from Tom Brady (Stephen Gostkowski kick), 3:58. Patriots 21–17. **Drive: 12 plays, 64 yards, 5:48.**

**Third quarter**

- CHI – Tarik Cohen 6-yard pass from Mitchell Trubisky (Cody Parkey kick), 12:04. Bears 24–21. **Drive: 6 plays, 58 yards, 2:56.**
- NE – Stephen Gostkowski 29-yard field goal, 7:48. Tied 24–24. **Drive: 9 plays, 64 yards, 4:16.**
- NE – Kyle Van Noy 29-yard return of block punt (Stephen Gostkowski kick), 5:53. Patriots 31–24.

**Fourth quarter**

- NE – James White 2-yard pass from Tom Brady (Stephen Gostkowski kick), 8:40. Patriots 38–24. **Drive: 9 plays, 96 yards, 4:25.**
- CHI – Trey Burton 11-yard pass from Mitchell Trubisky (Cody Parkey kick), 4:13. Patriots 38–31. **Drive: 6 plays, 63 yards, 2:11.**

**Top passers**

- NE – Tom Brady – 25/36, 277 yards, 3 TD, 1 INT
- CHI – Mitchell Trubisky – 26/50, 333 yards, 2 TD, 2 INT

**Top rushers**

- NE – James White – 11 carries, 40 yards
- CHI – Mitchell Trubisky – 6 carries, 81 yards, 1 TD

**Top receivers**

- NE – James White – 8 receptions, 57 yards, 2 TD
- CHI – Trey Burton – 9 receptions, 126 yards, 1 TD

The Bears hosted the New England Patriots in week seven. In 13 all-time games, the Patriots led the series 9–4 and had won every game since 2002. Patriots quarterback Tom Brady excelled against the blitz (passer rating of 138.4 under such circumstances) but his rating dropped to 87.2 when pressured, a situation that Stankevitz argued would be crucial for the Bears defense. USA Today's Bryan Perez added Brady's passer rating fell when he held onto the ball for longer than 2.5 seconds, so forcing him to bide his time before throwing was another factor of importance. Besides Brady, New England's offense also featured a rushing attack led by rookie Sony Michel, who entered the game with the third-most first down conversions in the league. On the other hand, the Patriots were without tight end Rob Gronkowski, who was sidelined with ankle and back injuries. For the Bears offense, scoring in the red zone was crucial, especially as the Patriots defense was allowing 68 percent of red zone drives to end in touchdowns. Perez stressed the need for Trubisky to perform well quickly and to "have his most accurate and efficient game of the season against the greatest quarterback he'll ever face in his career." Although Stankevitz did not expect Chicago to win, losing "wouldn't dampen the positive vibes around the Bears, so long as they respond with wins against the New York Jets and Buffalo Bills in the next two weeks." Hicks, Gabriel, and safety Deon Bush were named the captains for the game.

The Patriots scored on the opening drive that saw Brady complete all but one of his passes and every rushing attempt go for at least five yards. After two punts, Parkey converted a 46-yard field goal. On the ensuing kickoff, Nick Kwiatkoski knocked the ball out of Cordarrelle Patterson's hands and DeAndre Houston-Carson recovered the fumble. Five plays into the drive and on third down, Trubisky faced pressure that forced him to retreat horizontally across the field before advancing forward, running for the touchdown; while the score is officially an eight-yard touchdown run, Trubisky ran a distance of 71.91 yards on the play. A series later, Michel was pulled to the ground by Bilal Nichols and fumbled, with Nichols recovering the loose ball; Michel subsequently exited the game with a knee injury. Howard scored on a two-yard run to increase the Bears' advantage to ten points. However, the Patriots scored 14 unanswered points as Patterson returned the following kickoff 95 yards for a touchdown, followed by James White catching a five-yard touchdown pass from Brady to put New England up 21–17 at halftime. On the first drive of the second half, Trubisky led a drive that saw him run a 39 yards to the Patriots' one-yard line, where he eventually threw a six-yard touchdown to Cohen. Stephen Gostkowski kicked a 29-yard field goal, which was followed by Pat O'Donnell's punt getting blocked by Dont'a Hightower and returned by Kyle Van Noy for a 29-yard return touchdown. During the third quarter, Trubisky was intercepted by J. C. Jackson, though the Patriots could not score. A quarter later, Jonathan Jones intercepted him again, which set up Brady's two-yard touchdown throw to White. With about 6:30 left in the game and down by two touchdowns, Chicago attempted to fight back when Fuller intercepted Brady; Trubisky's 11-yard touchdown to Burton narrowed the margin by seven. New England punted with 24 seconds remaining in the game. The Bears reached as far as their 45-yard line with one second left, where Trubisky threw a Hail Mary pass; although Kevin White caught the pass, he was tackled one yard short of the end zone to seal the 38–31 defeat.

Now on a two-game losing streak that dropped them to 3–3, the Bears fell from first to third in the NFC, tied with the Lions. Trubisky's 39-yard run to set up the Cohen touchdown was the longest by a Bear in 2018, while his team-leading 81 rushing yards were the most by a Bears quarterback since Cade McNown in 2000.

==== Week 8: vs. New York Jets ====
Week Eight: New York Jets at Chicago Bears – Game summary

Quarter	1	2	3	4	Total
Jets	0	3	0	7	**10**
**Bears**	7	0	7	10	**24**

at Soldier Field, Chicago, Illinois

- Date: October 28
- Game time: 12:00 p.m. CDT
- Game weather: 48 °F (9 °C), cloudy
- Game attendance: 61,397
- Referee: Clete Blakeman
- TV announcers (CBS): Jim Nantz, Tony Romo, Tracy Wolfson, and Gene Steratore
- Recap, Gamebook

Game information

**First quarter**

- CHI – Tarik Cohen 70-yard pass from Mitchell Trubisky (Cody Parkey kick), 5:24. Bears 7–0. **Drive: 3 plays, 88 yards, 0:56.**

**Second quarter**

- NYJ – Jason Myers 42-yard field goal, 11:59. Bears 7–3. **Drive: 14 plays, 51 yards, 8:25.**

**Third quarter**

- CHI – Anthony Miller 4-yard pass from Mitchell Trubisky (Cody Parkey kick), 7:13. Bears 14–3. **Drive: 9 plays, 55 yards, 3:41.**

**Fourth quarter**

- CHI – Cody Parkey 32-yard field goal, 14:56. Bears 17–3. **Drive: 10 plays, 36 yards, 5:32.**
- NYJ – Chris Herndon 16-yard pass from Sam Darnold (Jason Myers kick), 11:10. Bears 17–10. **Drive: 8 plays, 75 yards, 3:46.**
- CHI – Jordan Howard 2-yard run (Cody Parkey kick), 7:08. Bears 24–10. **Drive: 8 plays, 79 yards, 4:02.**

**Top passers**

- NYJ – Sam Darnold – 14/29, 153 yards, 1 TD
- CHI – Mitchell Trubisky – 16/29, 220 yards, 2 TD

**Top rushers**

- NYJ – Isaiah Crowell – 13 carries, 25 yards
- CHI – Jordan Howard – 22 carries, 81 yards, 1 TD

**Top receivers**

- NYJ – Deontay Burnett – 4 receptions, 61 yards
- CHI – Taylor Gabriel – 4 receptions, 52 yards

The New York Jets, who had not defeated the Bears since 2000 and won just three of eleven all-time meetings, visited Soldier Field in week eight. The Jets were led by rookie quarterback Sam Darnold and running back Isaiah Crowell, who was averaging 5.7 yards per carry. Entering the game, Darnold led the league in interceptions with ten and had lost much of his receiving corps to injury, a predicament that Stankevitz pointed out could be exploited by the Bears defense even with Mack out with ankle issues; the game was the first that Mack missed in his NFL career. For the Bears offense, Robinson did not play due to a nagging groin injury. As Trubisky struggled under pressure, Stankevitz expressed the need to protect him from Todd Bowles' blitzes; Trubisky's 70.7 completion percentage dropped to 54.1 when blitzed. Nevertheless, Stankevitz predicted the Bears would record a "comfortable win" considering their advantages, especially with the help of playing at home. Cody Whitehair, Fuller, and Houston-Carson served as captains.

The Jets punted on the opening drive, followed by Parkey missing a 40-yard field goal wide right. After a second Jets punt, the Bears scored the first touchdown as Trubisky threw a screen to Cohen before the blitz could overwhelm him, enabling Cohen to run for the 70-yard touchdown. New York responded with Jason Myers' 42-yard kick in the second quarter, which was followed by punts on every possession for the rest of the first half. In the third quarter, Trubisky threw a four-yard touchdown to Miller, and Parkey added a 32-yard field goal to start the fourth quarter and put the Bears up by two touchdowns. The Jets answered with Darnold's 16-yard touchdown to Chris Herndon, completing a 75-yard drive that was aided by Jackson's unnecessary roughness penalty on third down and a 29-yard throw by Darnold to Deontay Burnett. Chicago retaliated with a 79-yard series that concluded with Howard's two-yard touchdown run; Howard also recorded a 24-yard run on the drive, his longest of the year. Following two punts, time ran out during the Jets' final drive to close the game.

Although the Bears defense recorded only one sack (by Callahan), it held the Jets' rushing game to just 2.4 yards per carry and 57 rushing yards. The Jets offense had just 98 total yards after three quarters, and ended with 201 (75 of which came in garbage time), the lowest allowed by the 2018 Bears to date. Leno said, "We wanted to see what we could do after going down two games and we got a 'W'. We're just trying to build from that. We're a tough resilient team and we're just going to try to keep battling."

During the fourth quarter, Long and tight end Dion Sims were blocking for Howard when Sims landed on Long's right foot. On November 3, the Bears placed Long on injured reserve and promoted Mizzell from the practice squad to take his place. It was Long's third straight season plagued by long-term injury. In his place, Eric Kush and Witzmann split duties at right guard.

==== Week 9: at Buffalo Bills ====
Week Nine: Chicago Bears at Buffalo Bills – Game summary

Quarter	1	2	3	4	Total
**Bears**	0	28	3	10	**41**
Bills	0	0	3	6	**9**

at New Era Field, Orchard Park, New York

- Date: November 4
- Game time: 1:00 p.m. EST/12:00 p.m. CST
- Game weather: 49 °F (9 °C), mostly sunny
- Game attendance: 68,749
- Referee: Shawn Smith
- TV announcers (Fox): Chris Myers, Daryl Johnston, and Laura Okmin
- Recap, Gamebook

Game information

**First quarter**

- No scoring plays.

**Second quarter**

- CHI – Jordan Howard 1-yard run (Cody Parkey kick), 13:04. Bears 7–0. **Drive: 6 plays, 37 yards, 2:52.**
- CHI – Eddie Jackson 65-yard fumble return (Cody Parkey kick), 7:07. Bears 14–0.
- CHI – Leonard Floyd 19-yard interception return (Cody Parkey kick), 3:32. Bears 21–0.
- CHI – Jordan Howard 18-yard run (Cody Parkey kick), 0:44. Bears 28–0. **Drive: 2 plays, 23 yards, 0:39.**

**Third quarter**

- BUF – Stephen Hauschka 41-yard field goal, 11:01. Bears 28–3. **Drive: 12 plays, 52 yards, 3:59.**
- CHI – Cody Parkey 23-yard field goal, 8:13. Bears 31–3. **Drive: 5 plays, 70 yards, 2:48.**

**Fourth quarter**

- CHI – Cody Parkey 45-yard field goal, 13:33. Bears 34–3. **Drive: 5 plays, 70 yards, 2:48.**
- BUF – Nathan Peterman 1-yard run (pass failed), 5:41. Bears 34–9. **Drive: 15 plays, 75 yards, 7:52.**
- CHI – Trey Burton 2-yard pass from Mitchell Trubisky (Cody Parkey kick), 4:36. Bears 41–9. **Drive: 4 plays, 50 yards, 1:05.**

**Top passers**

- CHI – Mitchell Trubisky – 12/20, 135 yards, 1 TD, 1 INT
- BUF – Nathan Peterman – 31/49, 189 yards, 3 INT

**Top rushers**

- CHI – Jordan Howard – 14 carries, 47 yards, 2 TD
- BUF – Nathan Peterman – 8 carries, 46 yards, 1 TD

**Top receivers**

- CHI – Anthony Miller – 5 receptions, 49 yards
- BUF – Logan Thomas – 7 receptions, 40 yards

In a rematch of the final preseason game, the Bears went to New Era Field to play the 2–6 Bills; it was the Bears' first game in Orchard Park, New York since a 33–27 loss in 2002, and although the Bears lost the latest meeting in 2014, they led the series 7–5. With starter Josh Allen and backup Derek Anderson out due to injuries, the Bills were forced to play third stringer Nathan Peterman at quarterback. In seven career appearances and three starts, Peterman struggled mightily as he had just three touchdown passes against nine interceptions, a 45.7 completion percentage, and a passer rating of 31.4. Buffalo's offense was also unimpressive in 2018, failing to score a touchdown in its latest two games having just two in the last five; the Bills were the 13th NFL team since 1940 to have seven or fewer touchdowns in the first eight games of a season. Despite the Bills' offensive woes, Stankevitz noted the Bears should remain disciplined and avoid committing penalties or turnovers that would keep Buffalo in contention. The Bears defense entered the game having yet to allow a rushing touchdown in 2018. For Chicago's offense, it faced a Bills defense that Stankevitz connected to the 2017 Bears' in terms of stinginess and ability to prevent major plays. As such, Stankevitz wrote the offense should not be aggressive or try to "force anything". Comparing the game to the previous week against the Jets, he concluded his preview by predicting a Bears win in which they played a "disciplined, clean game without a string of glaring mistakes." Leno, Floyd, and O'Donnell were the Bears' captains for the game.

The first quarter saw no scores and every series end with a punt. In the following quarter, Chicago scored 28 unanswered points starting with Howard's one-yard touchdown run. Over the Bills' next three possessions, the Bears recorded turnovers on each: Jackson stripped Jason Croom and returned the fumble 65 yards for a touchdown, followed by Adrian Amos intercepting a tipped pass, and Leonard Floyd doing the same and scoring on a 19-yard pick-six. Howard added an 18-yard touchdown run late in the first half to put the Bears up 28–0 at halftime. Both teams traded field goals to start the second half; after a Bills punt, Trubisky was intercepted by Tre'Davious White, though Buffalo could not capitalize and turned the ball over on downs. On the final play of the third quarter, Peterman was picked off by Fuller to set up Parkey's 45-yard field goal. On the Bills' ensuing drive, Peterman saw two sacks nullified by 15-yard penalties on Lynch and Smith for unsportsmanlike conduct and facemasking, respectively. A defensive pass interference penalty on Amukamara in the end zone pushed Buffalo's offense to Chicago's one-yard line, where Peterman scored the first rushing touchdown on the Bears defense of 2018. After recovering Steven Hauschka's onside kick, the Bears responded with Trubisky's two-yard touchdown pass to Burton. The Bills reached the Bears' 31-yard line on their final drive before Peterman was sacked by Roy Robertson-Harris on fourth down. Daniel kneeled thrice to end the game.

As the Bears' fifth win of 2018, they tied their total from 2017. The 41–9 victory was the team's largest road win since a 2012 41–3 win over the Jacksonville Jaguars. Nagy commented, "Mentally, I thought our guys were strong all week and it showed on the field. They came ready to play and that was great in so many ways."

A day later, the Bears signed former Vikings offensive lineman Willie Beavers. Most recently a member of the Seahawks, Beavers had visited the Bears along with Witzmann in early October.

==== Week 10: vs. Detroit Lions ====
Week Ten: Detroit Lions at Chicago Bears – Game summary

Quarter	1	2	3	4	Total
Lions	0	7	3	12	**22**
**Bears**	13	13	8	0	**34**

at Soldier Field, Chicago, Illinois

- Date: November 11
- Game time: 12:00 p.m. CST
- Game weather: 37 °F (3 °C), mostly cloudy
- Game attendance: 61,393
- Referee: Alex Kemp
- TV announcers (Fox): Chris Myers, Daryl Johnston, and Laura Okmin
- Recap, Gamebook

Game information

**First quarter**

- CHI – Tarik Cohen 3 yard run, 11:22. **Drive: 8 plays, 75 yards, 3:38.** Bears 6–0.
- CHI – Allen Robinson 36 yard pass from Mitchell Trubisky (Cody Parkey kick), 0:39. **Drive: 8 plays, 91 yards, 4:36.** Bears 13–0.

**Second quarter**

- CHI – Anthony Miller 45 yard pass from Mitchell Trubisky, 11:24. **Drive: 4 plays, 71 yards, 1:56.** Bears 19–0.
- CHI – Mitchell Trubisky 4 yard run (Cody Parkey kick), 8:14. **Drive: 4 plays, 18 yards, 1:38.** Bears 26–0.
- DET – Kerryon Johnson 1 yard run (Matt Prater kick), 1:05. **Drive: 14 plays, 75 yards, 7:09.** Bears 26–7.

**Third quarter**

- DET – Matt Prater 52 yard field goal, 13:23. **Drive: 5 plays, 36 yards, 1:37.** Bears 26–10.
- CHI – Allen Robinson 26 yard pass from Mitchell Trubisky (Mitchell Trubisky pass to Trey Burton for two-point conversion), 2:50. **Drive: 2 plays, 50 yards, 0:54.** Bears 34–10.

**Fourth quarter**

- DET – Kenny Golladay 5 yd pass from Matthew Stafford, 8:30. **Drive: 5 plays, 50 yards, 2:00.** Bears 34–16.
- DET – Kerryon Johnson 13 yd pass from Matthew Stafford, 7:21. **Drive: 5 plays, 38 yards, 1:09.** Bears 34–22.

**Top passers**

- DET – Matthew Stafford – 25/42, 274 yards, 2 TD, 2 INT
- CHI – Mitchell Trubisky – 23/30, 355 yards, 3 TD

**Top rushers**

- DET – Kerryon Johnson – 14 carries, 51 yards, TD
- CHI – Jordan Howard – 11 carries, 21 yards

**Top receivers**

- DET – Kenny Golladay – 6 receptions, 78 yards, TD
- CHI – Allen Robinson – 6 receptions, 133 yards, 2 TD

Entering their week ten matchup, the Bears–Lions rivalry was led by the former 97–74–5, though the 3–5 Lions had won nine of the last ten meetings. After missing the last two games with ankle issues, Mack returned to the team for the game, bolstering a defense that faced a Lions offense who traded away receiver Golden Tate and was slow in improving its rushing attack with rookie Kerryon Johnson. Lions quarterback Matthew Stafford was also sacked ten times in the previous week's game against the Vikings. For the Bears offense, which got Robinson back from his groin injury, they played a Lions defensive unit that was allowing 357.1 passing yards and 142.5 rushing yards per game. Detroit also lost cornerback Darius Slay to an injury. Stankevitz wrote the offense would capitalize on Slay missing the game and a strong defense to record "a comfortable win." Callahan, Michael Burton, and Patrick Scales were team captains.

The Bears scored on the opening drive via Cohen's three-yard touchdown run, though Parkey's extra point hit the right upright. After the Lions punted, the Bears scored again as Trubisky led a 91-yard series that culminated on a 36-yard touchdown throw to Robinson. In the second quarter, Trubisky threw a 45-yard touchdown pass to Miller, but Parkey once again had his PAT knock the left upright. On Detroit's next drive, Stafford was intercepted by Callahan to set up Trubisky's four-yard touchdown run. The Lions scored their first points of the game late in the first half with Johnson's one-yard run. Matt Prater kicked a 52-yard field goal on the first possession of the second half; when the Bears attempted to respond in kind with Parkey's 41-yard field goal, his unusual kicking problems continued as the ball collided with the right upright again. Johnson lost a fumble to Amos on the next drive, but Parkey once again fell victim to the uprights as his 34-yard kick sailed into the right one for the third time. Three drives later, Trubisky threw a 26-yard touchdown to Robinson; instead of kicking the extra point, Chicago elected to try the two-point conversion, which succeeded on a Trubisky pass to Trey Burton. Early in the fourth quarter, Stafford's deep pass was intercepted by Amukamara on the Bears' three-yard line, but the team was forced to punt. The Lions added two consecutive scores on Stafford's five- and thirteen-yard touchdowns to Kenny Golladay and Johnson, though their two-point conversions failed to make the score 34–22. Cohen recovered the onside kick with 7:21 left in the game and the Bears drained the clock to 1:15 before punting. Detroit could not score as the game came to a close.

With the victory, the Bears broke a ten-game losing streak against divisional teams; the sixth win also surpassed their total from 2017. In their first game back, Robinson recorded six receptions for 133 yards and two touchdowns, while Mack had two sacks.

Regarding his bizarre day, Parkey commented, "I don't think I've hit the posts four times in my whole life, and I've been kicking for almost 15 years. So it's almost comical. I was just pointing the ball down the middle today, and every time I kicked it down the middle, it just kept fading to the right. The wind was pushing it a little bit on me, but I have to be better than that. That's why I'm here." Nagy added the Bears had no intention of signing new kickers.

==== Week 11: vs. Minnesota Vikings ====
Week Eleven: Minnesota Vikings at Chicago Bears – Game summary

Quarter	1	2	3	4	Total
Vikings	0	0	3	17	**20**
**Bears**	3	11	0	11	**25**

at Soldier Field, Chicago, Illinois

- Date: November 18
- Game time: 7:20 p.m. CST
- Game weather: 33 °F (1 °C), partly cloudy
- Game attendance: 61,651
- Referee: John Parry
- TV announcers (NBC): Al Michaels, Cris Collinsworth, Michele Tafoya, and Terry McAulay
- Recap, Gamebook

Game information

**First quarter**

- CHI – Cody Parkey 33-yard field goal, 5:58. Bears 3–0. **Drive: 12 plays, 64 yards, 6:54.**

**Second quarter**

- CHI – Anthony Miller 18-yard pass from Mitchell Trubisky (Mitchell Trubisky-Josh Bellamy pass), 6:00. Bears 11–0. **Drive: 13 plays, 82 yards, 7:13.**
- CHI – Cody Parkey 41-yard field goal, 0:50. Bears 14–0. **Drive: 10 plays, 41 yards, 3:57.**

**Third quarter**

- MIN – Dan Bailey 36-yard field goal, 0:07. Bears 14–3. **Drive: 8 plays, 13 yards, 3:15.**

**Fourth quarter**

- MIN – Dan Bailey 36-yard field goal, 11:46. Bears 14–6. **Drive: 5 plays, 11 yards, 2:33.**
- CHI – Eddie Jackson 27-yard interception returm (Mitchell Trubisky-Adam Shaheen pass), 8:30. Bears 22–6.
- MIN – Aldrick Robinson 13-yard pass from Kirk Cousins (Kirk Cousins-Adam Thielen pass), 4:51. Bears 22–14. **Drive: 11 plays, 74 yards, 3:39.**
- CHI – Cody Parkey 48-yard field goal, 2:48. Bears 25–14. **Drive: 8 plays, 45 yards, 2:03.**
- MIN – Stefon Diggs 5-yard pass from Kirk Cousins (pass failed), 0:48. Bears 25–20. **Drive: 11 plays, 75 yards, 2:00.**

**Top passers**

- MIN – Kirk Cousins – 30/46, 262 yards, 2 TD, 2 INT
- CHI – Mitchell Trubisky – 20/31, 165 yards, 1 TD, 2 INT

**Top rushers**

- MIN – Dalvin Cook – 9 carries, 12 yards
- CHI – Jordan Howard – 18 carries, 63 yards

**Top receivers**

- MIN – Stefon Diggs – 13 receptions, 126 yards, 1 TD
- CHI – Taylor Gabriel – 7 receptions, 52 yards

Donning the orange jerseys, the Bears hosted the 5–3–1 Minnesota Vikings on Sunday Night Football in a battle for the NFC North lead. In their 114-game rivalry, the Vikings held the all-time lead 60–52–2 and had won the last three matchups. The Bears took on a Vikings offense featuring new quarterback Kirk Cousins, receivers Adam Thielen, who had at least 100 receiving yards in eight of the first nine games of 2018, and Stefon Diggs, who had at least 90 in four. In his pre-game strategy article for the week, Stankevitz wrote about recording key plays like takeaways and sacks to swing momentum in the Bears' favor. For the offense, it faced a Minnesota defense that was allowing 8.6 yards on third down; although the three teams that beat the Vikings struggled on third down against them, it was crucial to convert in such situations. Stankevitz also emphasized the need for the team on both sides to improve in the fourth quarter and to record a "'statement game' in which they prove they've arrived against a good team, or at least a team generally thought to be good." On Saturday, the team activated Adam Shaheen from injured reserve in exchange for Sims, who suffered a concussion against the Bills and was absent since; in accordance with the moves, James Stone was removed from the practice squad. Trubisky, Mack, and Cunningham were the team captains for the game.

After a Vikings punt, the Bears scored first on Parkey's 33-yard field goal. The score was followed by two consecutive turnovers as Mack forced Vikings running back Dalvin Cook to fumble, followed by Trubisky's pass for Gabriel being intercepted by Anthony Harris. Trubisky rebounded from the error by throwing an 18-yard touchdown pass to Miller, followed by completing the two-point conversion to Bellamy; the decision to go for two over the safer extra point was influenced by Nagy's aggressive coaching style and his skepticism following Parkey's performance against the Lions. Parkey added a 41-yard field goal to put the Bears up 14–0, while Cousins' pass was picked off by Amos with ten seconds remaining in the first half. Late in the second half, Trubisky was intercepted again by Harris to set up Dan Bailey's 36-yard field goal. Cohen then lost a fumble to Jaleel Johnson that led to another 36-yarder by Bailey. With the margin narrowed to eight, it grew again when Jackson intercepted Cousins and returned the pick 27 yards for a touchdown; the Bears scored on the ensuing conversion via a Trubisky pass to Shaheen. Minnesota later scored on the next drive with Cousins' 13-yard touchdown to Aldrick Robinson, followed by a successful conversion on a throw to Thielen. With 2:48 left in the game, Parkey kicked his third field goal of the game, a 48-yard attempt. Two minutes later, Diggs caught a five-yard touchdown pass, but the Vikings failed to score on the conversion. Cunningham recovered the onside kick to secure the win.

Following his poor game against Detroit, Parkey rebounded by converting all three of his field goals against Minnesota. "For that to happen, what happened last week, and then for Cody to come back this week and be 3-for-3 in field goals, it's just a testament to him, who he is as a person," Nagy commented. "And then to see our team rally behind him, that's a special moment there that we'll all remember."

During the fourth quarter, Trubisky was hit in the shoulder by Harrison Smith while sliding, leading to an unnecessary roughness penalty on Smith. For the remainder of the game, he attempted just one pass (an incomplete) as other plays were runs. Lynch and Shaheen also suffered concussions. The three missed the following week's game against the Lions as a result of their injuries.

==== Week 12: at Detroit Lions ====
NFL on Thanksgiving Day

Week Twelve: Chicago Bears at Detroit Lions – Game summary

Quarter	1	2	3	4	Total
**Bears**	0	9	0	14	**23**
Lions	0	7	6	3	**16**

at Ford Field, Detroit, Michigan

- Date: November 22
- Game time: 12:30 p.m. EST/11:30 a.m. CST
- Game weather: Played indoors (dome stadium)
- Game attendance: 65,684
- Referee: Brad Allen
- TV announcers (CBS): Jim Nantz, Tony Romo, Tracy Wolfson, and Gene Steratore
- Recap, Gamebook

Game information

**First quarter**

- No scoring plays.

**Second quarter**

- DET – LeGarrette Blount 4-yard rush (Matt Prater kick), 9:03. Lions 7–0. **Drive: 9 plays, 40 yards, 5:40.**
- CHI – Cody Parkey 40-yard field goal, 4:03. Lions 7–3. **Drive: 11 plays, 53 yards, 5:05.**
- CHI – Taquan Mizzell 10-yard pass from Chase Daniel (pass failed), 0:44. Bears 9–7. **Drive: 5 plays, 65 yards, 1:30.**

**Third quarter**

- DET – LeGarrette Blount 4-yard rush (pass failed), 1:35. Lions 13–9. **Drive: 6 plays, 80 yards, 3:00.**

**Fourth quarter**

- CHI – Tarik Cohen 14-yard pass from Chase Daniel (Cody Parkey kick), 13:40. Bears 16–13. **Drive: 8 plays, 82 yards, 2:55.**
- DET – Matt Prater 20-yard field goal, 7:45. Tied 16–16. **Drive: 11 plays, 73 yards, 5:56.**
- CHI – Eddie Jackson 41-yard interception return (Cody Parkey kick), 6:00. Bears 23–16.

**Top passers**

- CHI – Chase Daniel – 27/37, 230 yards, 2 TD
- DET – Matthew Stafford – 28/38, 236 yards, 2 INT

**Top rushers**

- CHI – Tarik Cohen – 3 carries, 14 yards
- DET – LeGarrette Blount – 19 carries, 88 yards, 2 TD

**Top receivers**

- CHI – Taylor Gabriel – 7 receptions, 49 yards
- DET – Kenny Golladay – 5 receptions, 90 yards

Approximately 85 hours and three days after the Vikings game, a brief period dubbed a "mini-bye" by Nagy that only featured one practice and no film session, the Bears visited Ford Field to play the Lions for the second time in three weeks. Part of the NFL's Thanksgiving Day tradition, it was the 17th meeting between the two on the holiday; the Bears were 17–15–2 in total games played on Thanksgiving. With Trubisky out due to his shoulder injury, Chicago started Daniel at quarterback, his first regular season start since 2014 and third of his career. Tyler Bray was promoted from the practice squad to back up Daniel, which led to Marcus Cooper being released to make room for him on the active roster. While the Lions lost Johnson and receiver Marvin Jones to injuries of their own, Slay returned to action for the game. Parkey, Robinson, and Amos were team captains.

The scoreless first quarter saw five drives that ended with a punt. On the first play of the second quarter, Burton was stripped by DeShawn Shead and Jarrad Davis recovered the fumble, which set up LeGarrette Blount's four-yard touchdown run. Parkey later kicked a 40-yard field goal, followed by Daniel leading a 65-yard drive that culminated with his ten-yard touchdown pass to Mizzell with 40 seconds left in the first half. On the two-point conversion, Daniel's pass to Robinson was out of reach, making the score 9–7 at halftime. After three punts to open the second half, Blount scored on another four-yard run to give the Lions the lead, which Daniel answered with an 82-yard possession that led to a 14-yard touchdown throw to Cohen. In the fourth quarter, Prater kicked a 20-yard field goal to tie the game at 16 apiece. The Bears punted again, but on the ensuing series, Jackson intercepted Stafford's throw and returned it 41 yards for the go-ahead touchdown. The Lions moved down the field into the Bears' red zone, but Fuller picked off Stafford in the end zone with 1:11 left in the game. After three runs to exhaust the Lions' timeouts that led to a first down, Daniel kneeled to secure the game.

With the victory, the Bears enjoyed their first five-game win streak since 2012. It was also the first time since that year that Chicago swept Detroit, while the two wins against the Lions and one against the Vikings marked the longest winning streak against NFC North teams in six seasons. When talking about his team, Nagy said, "There's a challenge every week and they accepted my challenge of going 3–0 in 12 days against three division opponents."

Daniel completed 27 of 37 passes for 230 yards, two touchdowns, and a 106.8 passer rating. "You don't know when these opportunities will come and you just have to make the most of them," he stated.

Two days after the game, the Bears re-signed Franklin III to the practice squad.

==== Week 13: at New York Giants ====
Week Thirteen: Chicago Bears at New York Giants – Game summary

Quarter	1	2	3	4	OT	Total
Bears	7	7	0	13	0	**27**
**Giants**	7	3	14	3	3	**30**

at MetLife Stadium, East Rutherford, New Jersey

- Date: December 2
- Game time: 1:00 p.m. EST/12:00 p.m. CST
- Game weather: 52 °F (11 °C), cloudy
- Game attendance: 76,465
- Referee: Clay Martin
- TV announcers (Fox): Kevin Burkhardt, Charles Davis, and Pam Oliver
- Recap, Gamebook

Game information

**First quarter**

- NYG – Alec Ogletree 8-yard interception return (Aldrick Rosas kick), 14:14. Giants 7–0.
- CHI – Adam Shaheen 2-yard pass from Chase Daniel (Cody Parkey kick), 3:28. Tied 7–7. **Drive: 10 plays, 70 yards, 4:53.**

**Second quarter**

- CHI – Akiem Hicks 1-yard rush (Cody Parkey kick), 3:40. Bears 14–7. **Drive: 9 plays, 74 yards, 5:21.**
- NYG – Aldrick Rosas 57-yard field goal, 0:00. Bears 14–10. **Drive: 5 plays, 18 yards, 1:14.**

**Third quarter**

- NYG – Russell Shepard 49-yard pass from Odell Beckham Jr. (Aldrick Rosas kick), 12:49. Giants 17–14. **Drive: 4 plays, 75 yards, 2:11.**
- NYG – Odell Beckham Jr. 1-yard pass from Eli Manning (Aldrick Rosas kick), 3:58. Giants 24–14. **Drive: 13 plays, 60 yards, 7:11.**

**Fourth quarter**

- CHI – Cody Parkey 36-yard field goal, 9:25. Giants 24–17. **Drive: 7 plays, 56 yards, 3:08.**
- NYG – Aldrick Rosas 37-yard field goal, 1:49. Giants 27–17. **Drive: 4 plays, 4 yards, 0:30.**
- CHI – Cody Parkey 21-yard field goal, 1:13. Giants 27–20. **Drive: 7 plays, 72 yards, 0:36.**
- CHI – Anthony Miller 1-yard pass from Tarik Cohen (Cody Parkey kick), 0:00. Tied 27–27. **Drive: 7 plays, 53 yards, 1:13.**

**Overtime**

- NYG – Aldrick Rosas 44-yard field goal, 5:57. Giants 30–27. **Drive: 8 plays, 49 yards, 4:03.**

**Top passers**

- CHI – Chase Daniel – 26/39, 285 yards, 1 TD, 2 INT
- NYG – Eli Manning – 19/35, 170 yards, 1 TD, 1 INT

**Top rushers**

- CHI – Jordan Howard – 16 carries, 76 yards
- NYG – Saquon Barkley – 24 carries, 125 yards

**Top receivers**

- CHI – Tarik Cohen – 12 receptions, 156 yards
- NYG – Russell Shepard – 2 receptions, 59 yards, 1 TD

Trubisky remained out for the week thirteen game against the 3–8 New York Giants; although the Bears led the series 33–23–2, they had lost the last two games on the road. With Daniel leading the offense again, Stankevitz stressed the importance of avoiding turnovers, especially as the Giants averaged 30.8 points per game in those that they record at least two takeaways, compared to just 16 points if they do not. Chicago's defense was challenged by Giants receiver Odell Beckham Jr., who Vic Fangio remarked could only be contained by "going to mass on Saturday night", and running back Saquon Barkley, who Fangio described required all eleven players to stop. Nevertheless, quarterback Eli Manning struggled when pressured, being sacked 38 times and throwing four interceptions under such circumstances. Stankevitz added for the Bears to continue excelling and to "be yourself", especially as the team lost in Miami after a bye week, while they entered the Giants game after a nine-day break. Daniel, Kwiatkoski, Amukamara, and Michael Burton were team captains.

On the second play of the game, Daniel's pass to Cohen was underthrown and intercepted by Alec Ogletree, who returned the pick eight yards for the touchdown. Later in the quarter, Daniel threw a two-yard touchdown pass to Shaheen to tie the game. A drive later, Fuller intercepted Manning's pass for Beckham, but Daniel was picked off by Ogletree again on the next series. In the second quarter, the Bears placed Hicks in at fullback for a fourth-and-goal at the one-yard line, where he scored on a one-yard run; the play was called "Freezer Left" in tribute to William "The Refrigerator" Perry, the last Bears defensive lineman to score a rushing touchdown. On the final drive of the first half, Aldrick Rosas kicked a 57-yard field goal to make the score 14–10. The Giants opened the second half with Beckham throwing a 49-yard touchdown pass to Russell Shepard, followed by Manning's one-yard touchdown throw to Beckham on fourth down. In the fourth quarter, Parkey kicked a 36-yard field goal to draw the margin to seven points. Two possessions later, the Bears got the ball back on their own two-yard line with 2:26 left in the game, but Gabriel lost a fumble to Sean Chandler. Rosas' 37-yard field goal placed New York up by ten again, which Parkey answered with a 21-yard kick with 1:13 remaining. Daniel Brown recovered the ensuing onside kick. Daniel led the offense to the Giants' one-yard line, where they scored the game-tying touchdown on a trick play as time expired: Daniel handed off the ball to Trey Burton, who lateraled to Cohen in a similar play to the Philly Special that Burton was involved in a year prior, followed by Cohen throwing the touchdown to Miller. In overtime, Rosas kicked a 44-yard field goal to put New York up, but Chicago could not answer as Daniel fumbled thrice before turning the ball over on downs.

"I absolutely love this team," Nagy stated after the game. "I love where we're at. This is life, man. How are you going to rebound back from it? Are you going to sulk or are you going to pick it back up, go practice, go play and learn? And that's what we're going to do."

==== Week 14: vs. Los Angeles Rams ====
Week Fourteen: Los Angeles Rams at Chicago Bears – Game summary

Quarter	1	2	3	4	Total
Rams	3	3	0	0	**6**
**Bears**	3	3	9	0	**15**

at Soldier Field, Chicago, Illinois

- Date: December 9
- Game time: 7:20 p.m. CST
- Game weather: 29 °F (−2 °C), cloudy
- Game attendance: 61,695
- Referee: Craig Wrolstad
- TV announcers (NBC): Al Michaels, Cris Collinsworth, Michele Tafoya, and Terry McAulay
- Recap, Gamebook

Game information

**First quarter**

- LAR – Greg Zuerlein 27-yard field goal, 9:12. Rams 3–0. **Drive: 4 plays, 6 yards, 1:35.**
- CHI – Cody Parkey 39-yard field goal, 2:48. Tied 3–3. **Drive: 12 plays, 54 yards, 6:24.**

**Second quarter**

- CHI – Cody Parkey 31-yard field goal, 9:24. Bears 6–3. **Drive: 4 plays, 6 yards, 1:40.**
- LAR – Greg Zuerlein 50-yard field goal, 4:12. Tied 6–6. **Drive: 13 plays, 43 yards, 5:12.**

**Third quarter**

- CHI – Jared Goff sacked in end zone by Eddie Goldman for a safety, 14:14. Bears 8–6.
- CHI – Bradley Sowell 2-yard pass from Mitchell Trubisky (Cody Parkey kick), 9:58. Bears 15–6. **Drive: 9 plays, 81 yards, 4:16.**

**Fourth quarter**

- No scoring plays.

**Top passers**

- LAR – Jared Goff – 20/44, 180 yards, 4 INT
- CHI – Mitchell Trubisky – 16/30, 110 yards, TD, 3 INT

**Top rushers**

- LAR – Todd Gurley – 11 carries, 28 yards
- CHI – Jordan Howard – 19 carries, 101 yards

**Top receivers**

- LAR – Robert Woods – 7 receptions, 61 yards
- CHI – Allen Robinson – 5 receptions, 42 yards

On Sunday Night Football, the Bears hosted the NFC-leading 11–1 Los Angeles Rams. It was the first meeting between the two since the Rams' return to Los Angeles and the first in Chicago since a 23–6 Bears win in 2012; in 92 total games entering week fourteen, Chicago led 53–36–3. Chicago's second-ranked defense entered the game against Los Angeles' second-ranked offense led by quarterback Jared Goff, who ranked fourth in passing yards (3,754), sixth in passing touchdowns (27), and fifth in passer rating (109.9). Rams running back Todd Gurley led the league in rushing yards with 1,175 yards and 15 touchdowns. As a whole, Los Angeles was averaging 34.9 points and 439.9 per game, scoring at least 23 points in every game in 2018 and breaking the 30-point mark in all but two. Considering the Rams' success offensively, Stankevitz emphasized discipline by the Bears defense to avoid mistakes like allowing large plays. With Trubisky back, the Bears' 20th-ranked offense faced a Rams defense that was ranked 18th in total defense and 19th in scoring, having allowed 30-point games on five occasions in 2018. In order to contain the Rams offense, Stankevitz wrote the Bears offense needed to maintain control of the ball and time of possession, minimizing the likelihood of a high-scoring battle and allowing the Chicago defense to rest. Rather than the usual three captains, the Bears had six for the Rams game: Hicks, Jackson, Leno, Mack, Robinson, and Trubisky.

Trubisky's first drive ended when he was intercepted by Marcus Peters. Greg Zuerlein kicked a 27-yard field goal to give the Rams the early lead, which the Bears answered with Parkey's 39-yard kick. In the second quarter, Goff was intercepted by Smith to set up Parkey's 31-yard field goal; after converting a fourth down situation on a fake punt, Zuerlein tied the game with his 50-yard kick. The first half ended with two interceptions as Trubisky was picked off by Nickell Robey-Coleman, followed by Jackson picking off Goff on the last play of the half. On the second play of the second half, Goldman sacked Goff in the end zone for a safety, a play that Trubisky said "really set the tone for the second half." Chicago increased the lead on the ensuing drive on a trick play called "Santa's Sleigh": Trubisky faked the hand-off to Hicks before throwing a two-yard touchdown pass to Bradley Sowell. After a punt by the Rams, Trubisky was intercepted by John Johnson, but Fuller responded on the next play by intercepting Goff's pass, though the Bears eventually punted. In the fourth quarter, Zuerlein's 40-yard kick hit the right upright; Los Angeles' next drive resulted in a turnover on downs when Goff was sacked by Hicks. Parkey eventually missed a 38-yard field goal wide left. On fourth down, Goff was picked off for the fourth time as Amukamara recorded the takeaway. After the Bears punted with 25 seconds remaining, Justin Davis ran for 19 yards to conclude the game.

With the victory, the Bears secured their first winning season since 2012. The game is the first in the Super Bowl era in which the lone touchdown was scored by an offensive lineman. Both quarterbacks struggled: Trubisky completed 16 of 30 passes for 110 yards and a touchdown, but also had three interceptions and a career-worst 33.3 passer rating; Goff's four interceptions were the most in his career, while his 19.1 rating was also his lowest. Chicago's defense also limited Gurley to just 28 yards on 11 carries, while the Rams' six points were the fewest scored since Sean McVay became the team's head coach in 2017. It was the first game under McVay that the Rams failed to score a touchdown; McVay described the defeat as being "very, very humbling" for him. "Our play on defense, for me all I can say is, wow," Nagy said. "It was one that I haven't seen in a long, long time against such a powerful opponent."

During the game, Callahan broke his left foot and was placed on injured reserve. To take his roster spot, the Bears signed Marcus Williams, a former starter for the Jets who spent time with the Buccaneers in 2018.

==== Week 15: vs. Green Bay Packers ====
Week Fifteen: Green Bay Packers at Chicago Bears – Game summary

Quarter	1	2	3	4	Total
Packers	0	3	11	3	**17**
**Bears**	7	7	0	10	**24**

at Soldier Field, Chicago, Illinois

- Date: December 16
- Game time: 12:00 p.m. CST
- Game weather: 45 °F (7 °C), fair
- Game attendance: 62,372
- Referee: John Hussey
- TV announcers (Fox): Chris Myers, Daryl Johnston, and Laura Okmin
- Recap, Gamebook

Game information

**First quarter**

- CHI – Jordan Howard 9-yard run (Cody Parkey kick), 2:08. Bears 7–0. **Drive: 9 plays, 60 yards, 6:21**

**Second quarter**

- GB – Mason Crosby 41-yard field goal, 7:27. Bears 7–3. **Drive: 9 plays, 38 yards, 5:02**
- CHI – Tarik Cohen 12-yard pass from Mitchell Trubisky (Cody Parkey kick), 0:30. Bears 14–3. **Drive: 5 plays, 61 yards, 1:12.**

**Third quarter**

- GB – Mason Crosby 43-yard field goal, 9:26. Bears 14–6. **Drive: 11 plays, 50 yards, 5:34.**
- GB – Jamaal Williams 10-yard run (Aaron Rodgers pass to Davante Adams for 2-point conversion), 4:10. Tied 14–14. **Drive: 5 plays: 50 yards, 2:15.**

**Fourth quarter**

- CHI – Trey Burton 13-yard pass from Mitchell Trubisky (Cody Parkey kick), 10:16. Bears 21–14. **Drive: 5 plays, 45 yards, 2:56.**
- CHI – Cody Parkey 24-yard field goal, 6:43. Bears 24–14. **Drive: 4 plays, 9 yards, 2:29.**
- GB – Mason Crosby 45-yard field goal, 0:11. Bears 24–17. **Drive: 10 plays, 32 yards, 2:31**

**Top passers**

- GB – Aaron Rodgers – 25/42, 274 yards, 1 INT
- CHI – Mitchell Trubisky – 20/28, 235 yards, 2 TD

**Top rushers**

- GB – Jamaal Williams – 12 carries, 55 yards, 1 TD
- CHI – Jordan Howard – 19 carries, 60 yards, 1 TD

**Top receivers**

- GB – Davante Adams – 8 receptions, 119 yards
- CHI – Allen Robinson – 3 receptions, 54 yards

The Bears' second game against the Packers took place in week fifteen, this time at home; the Bears' last victory over their rivals at Soldier Field came in 2010, though the 5–7–1 Packers had yet to win an away game in 2018. Besides facing Rodgers, who entered the game with only one interception on the season, the Chicago defense was tasked with stopping running back Aaron Jones, who was averaging 5.6 yards per carry, including 6.5 yards in wins. To stop Jones, Stankevitz highlighted 4.5 yards per attempt as a critical number as the Seahawks, Vikings, and Cardinals each restricted Jones to below that average in the Packers' losses to them, while two of the Bears' losses came in which an opposing running back went over it. Stankevitz also emphasized the importance of not playing conservatively when ahead as the strategy led to the Bears' defeat in week one; he wrote, "The Bears are a better team than the Packers, plain and simple. But until this franchise proves it can reliably beat Rodgers, who's won 16 of his 20 regular season meetings with the Bears, these rivalry games shouldn't be met with overconfidence." Howard, Fuller, and O'Donnell were the Bears' captains for the game.

Punts wrapped up the first two drives of the game before Howard scored the first points on a nine-yard touchdown run. In the second quarter, Crosby kicked a 41-yard field goal, which the Bears answered on Trubisky's 12-yard touchdown pass to Cohen, who beat safety Kentrell Brice to the end zone. Green Bay responded with 11 unanswered points to tie the game on Crosby's 43-yard field goal and Jamaal Williams' ten-yard touchdown run that led to Rodgers' two-point conversion to Adams. Early in the fourth quarter, the Bears reached the Packers' 23-yard line before Cohen fumbled when he tried handing off the ball to Howard, with defensive end Dean Lowry recovering the loose ball. The Packers could not take advantage and eventually punted, followed by Trubisky throwing a 13-yard touchdown to Burton. After Parkey kicked a 24-yard field goal to put the Bears up by ten, Rodgers attempted to lead a drive into their red zone. On Chicago's nine-yard line, Jackson intercepted Rodgers, but suffered an ankle injury on the play. Following a Bears punt, Crosby kicked a 45-yard field goal with ten seconds left, and Robinson recovered the onside kick to secure the victory.

The Bears clinched the NFC North with the win for the first time since 2010, while also eliminating the Packers from playoff contention. After the game, Amukamara said, "The McCaskeys are probably so excited. They are going to have an even better Christmas. This was for the fans, this was for the organization, and we are glad that we were able to do it."

Until the 2024 season, this was the Bears' most recent win over the Packers, who have swept the Bears in each of the next five seasons. This would also the Bears last home win against Green Bay along with their last division title until 2025.

==== Week 16: at San Francisco 49ers ====
Week Sixteen: Chicago Bears at San Francisco 49ers – Game summary

Quarter	1	2	3	4	Total
**Bears**	0	7	7	0	**14**
49ers	0	9	0	0	**9**

at Levi's Stadium, Santa Clara, California

- Date: December 23
- Game time: 3:05 p.m. CST/1:05 p.m. PST
- Game weather: 50 °F (10 °C), partly cloudy
- Game attendance: 70,806
- Referee: Alex Kemp
- TV announcers (Fox): Thom Brennaman, Chris Spielman, and Shannon Spake
- Recap, Gamebook

Game information

**First quarter**

- No scoring plays.

**Second quarter**

- SF – Robbie Gould 33-yard field goal, 10:54. 49ers 3–0. **Drive: 12 plays, 48 yards, 6:26.**
- SF – Robbie Gould 30-yard field goal, 5:49. 49ers 6–0. **Drive: 7 plays, 14 yards, 3:00.**
- CHI – Anthony Miller 4-yard pass from Mitchell Trubisky (Cody Parkey kick), 1:52. Bears 7–6. **Drive: 8 plays, 75 yards, 3:57**
- SF – Robbie Gould 23-yard field goal, 0:00. 49ers 9–7. **Drive: 8 plays, 63 yards, 1:52.**

**Third quarter**

- CHI – Jordan Howard 2-yard run (Cody Parkey kick), 4:14. Bears 14–9. **Drive: 12 plays, 90 yards, 7:43.**

**Fourth quarter**

- No scoring plays.

**Top passers**

- CHI – Mitchell Trubisky – 25/29, 246 yards, 1 TD
- SF – Nick Mullens – 22/38, 241 yards, 1 INT

**Top rushers**

- CHI – Jordan Howard – 13 rushes, 53 yards, 1 TD
- SF – Jeff Wilson Jr. – 11 rushes, 27 yards

**Top receivers**

- CHI – Allen Robinson – 6 receptions, 85 yards
- SF – George Kittle – 7 receptions, 74 yards

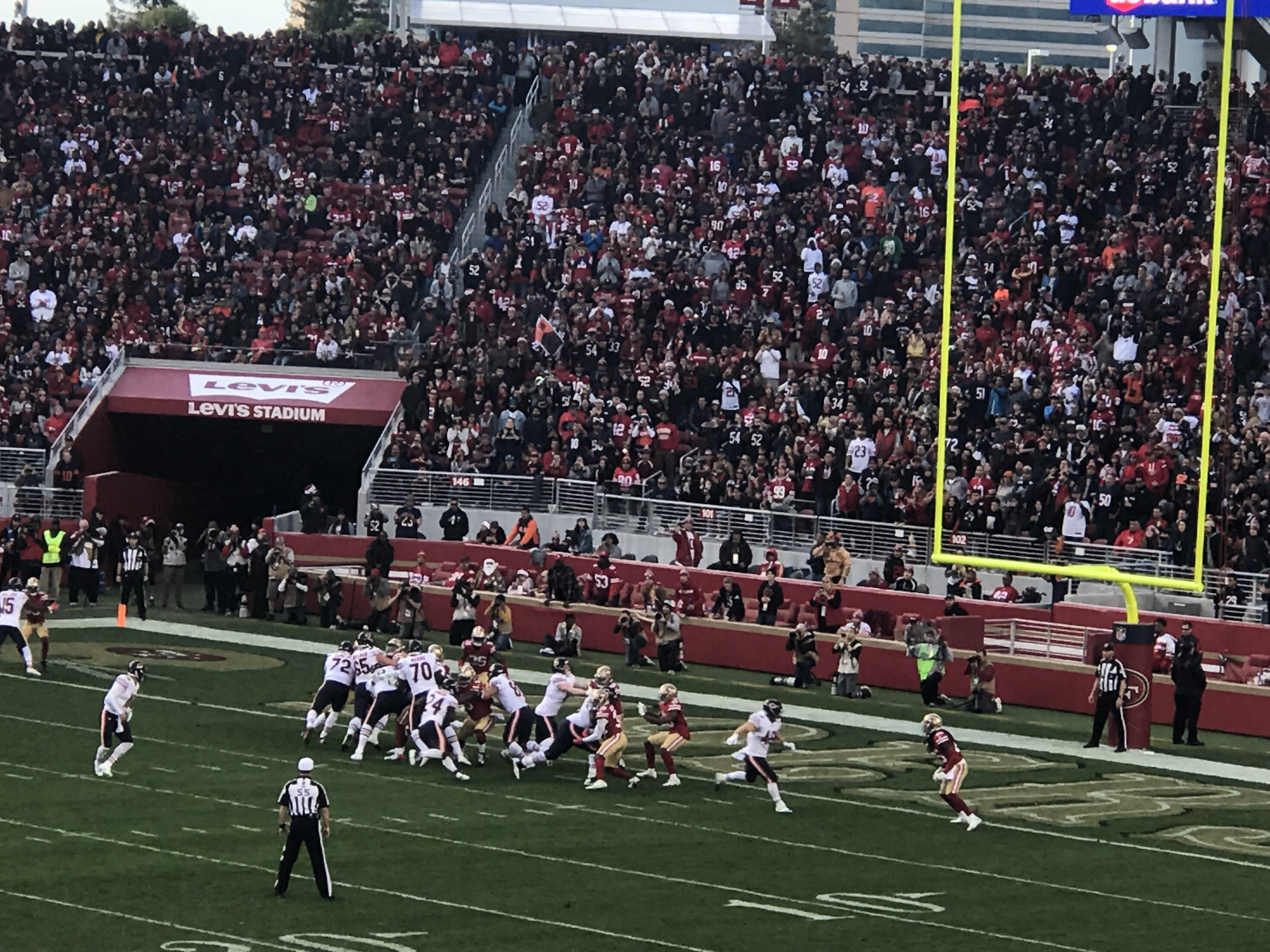
The Bears offense against the 49ers

In week sixteen, the Bears played the 4–10 San Francisco 49ers in Levi's Stadium. In 66 all-time games, the 49ers led the series 34–31–1, including winning the last game 15–14 in 2017, though the Bears won the latest away game 28–24 in 2014. The 49ers offense was led by rookie quarterback Nick Mullens, who completed 63 percent of his throws for 1,021 yards, five touchdowns, two interceptions, and a 101.4 passer rating in his last three games; he also had five touchdowns against one interception for a rating of 113.8 against blitzing defenses. Defensively, San Francisco was described by Stankevitz as not making "lot of sense", especially as it forced just two interceptions in 2018 but allowed fewer than four plays of at least 20 yards; Stankevitz compared this to the 2017 Bears' defense, which struggled to record interceptions but did not allow major-yardage plays. Stankevitz wrote a victory was crucial in proving the Bears' competitiveness on the road and keeping them in contention for a first-round bye. Shaheen, Irving, and Robertson-Harris served as team captains; Robertson-Harris and Irving are from the San Francisco Bay Area, with the latter also playing college football at San Jose State.

A scoreless first quarter saw Parkey miss a 37-yard field goal (again) and punts on other drives. In the second quarter, 49ers kicker Robbie Gould scored on three consecutive drives with field goals of 33, 30, and 23 yards; the second kick capitalized on a botched Trubisky fumble that was recovered by DeForest Buckner. When the Bears were down 6–0, Trubisky was intercepted by K'Waun Williams in the end zone, but a holding penalty on Fred Warner nullified the turnover; Trubisky eventually threw a four-yard touchdown pass to Miller. After the 49ers punted to start the second half, Robinson lost a fumble to Marcell Harris until review overturned the play. The Bears offense drove 90 yards and Howard capped off the series with a two-yard touchdown run. In the fourth quarter, the 49ers reached the Bears' red zone before Mullens' pass for Marquise Goodwin bounced off his hands to Trevathan for the interception. On the following drive, Trubisky was hit by Harris after sliding near the Chicago sideline, sparking a brawl; Harris received a 15-yard penalty for the hit, while Bellamy, Miller, and 49ers cornerback Richard Sherman were ejected for their involvement in the fight. Later on the drive, Robinson had the ball punched from his hands by Tarvarius Moore and recovered by the 49ers' Greg Mabin. With 1:52 remaining in the game, the 49ers reached the Bears' 45-yard line before Mullens' pass for Goodwin on fourth down fell incomplete. Trubisky kneeled twice to end the game.

The victory guaranteed the Bears would receive the third seed at the least in the playoffs, though the second seed is a possibility provided they defeat the Vikings and the Rams lose to the 49ers in week seventeen. Amukamara stated after the game, "Because we've been in this situation so many times and we've come up big, it's almost expected of us. Like when we had to go back on the field to win it, everyone was poised. Nobody was shaken. We expected great things to come out of here."

Trubisky completed 25 of 29 passes for 246 yards and a touchdown in the win for a completion percentage of 86.2, the highest by a Bears quarterback in a game with at least 20 passes since 1950. He also surpassed the 3,000 passing yards in a season mark, becoming the sixth quarterback in Bears history to accomplish the feat.

==== Week 17: at Minnesota Vikings ====
Week Seventeen: Chicago Bears at Minnesota Vikings – Game summary

Quarter	1	2	3	4	Total
**Bears**	7	6	0	11	**24**
Vikings	0	3	7	0	**10**

at U.S. Bank Stadium, Minneapolis, Minnesota

- Date: December 30
- Game time: 3:25 p.m. CST
- Game weather: Played indoors (dome stadium)
- Game attendance: 66,878
- Referee: Clete Blakeman
- TV announcers (Fox): Joe Buck, Troy Aikman, Erin Andrews, and Mike Pereira
- Recap, Gamebook

Game information

**First quarter**

- CHI – Jordan Howard 6-yard run (Cody Parkey kick), 10:38. Bears 7–0. **Drive: 6 plays, 71 yards, 3:46**

**Second quarter**

- CHI – Jordan Howard 1-yard run, 7:17. Bears 13–0. **Drive: 10 plays, 85 yards, 5:39**
- MIN – Dan Bailey 45-yard field goal, 0:53. Bears 13–3. **Drive: 8 plays, 37 yards, 1:04**

**Third quarter**

- MIN – Stefon Diggs 2-yard pass from Kirk Cousins (Dan Bailey Kick), 1:51. Bears 13–10. **Drive: 12 plays, 92 yards, 7:35**

**Fourth quarter**

- CHI – Tarik Cohen 3-yard run (Mitchell Trubisky-Nick Kwiatkoski) pass, 7:46. Bears 21–10. **Drive: 16 plays, 75 yards, 9:05**
- CHI – Cody Parkey 42-yard field goal, 4:25. Bears 24–10. **Drive: 4 plays, 8 yards, 2:29**

**Top passers**

- CHI – Mitchell Trubisky – 18/26, 163 yards
- MIN – Kirk Cousins – 20/33, 132 yards, TD

**Top rushers**

- CHI – Jordan Howard – 21 rushes, 109 yards, 2 TD
- MIN – Dalvin Cook – 11 rushes, 39 yards

**Top receivers**

- CHI – Taylor Gabriel – 4 receptions, 61 yards
- MIN – Stefon Diggs – 8 receptions, 47 yards, TD

In the final week of the regular season, the Bears played their second game against the 8–6–1 Vikings, who required a win to qualify for the playoffs. In his keys article, Stanketvitz stressed the need to minimize turnovers, especially in Minnesota. For the Bears' defense, he wrote the unit especially had to stop the run against a Vikings offense that recorded 320 combined rushing yards in their last two victories under new offensive coordinator Kevin Stefanski; Minnesota running back Dalvin Cook, who was limited to just 12 yards in week eleven, averaged over 100 yards and a touchdown in the two wins. 320 yards on the ground in wins over the Miami Dolphins and Detroit Lions. Stankevitz also noted Cousins struggled in a similar playoff-determining situation with the 2016 Washington Redskins, throwing two interceptions in a loss. Nevertheless, considering the importance of a win for the Vikings, Stankevitz predicted a Bears loss. The day before the game, Long was activated from IR and Bray was waived to allow roster space; Bray eventually returned to the practice squad, taking Beavers' place. Bush, Houston-Carson, and Sowell were team captains.

The Vikings punted on the opening drive, which the Bears followed by scoring on Howard's six-yard touchdown run. After five consecutive series of punts, Howard scored again on a one-yard run, but Parkey missed the extra point. With 53 seconds remaining in the first half, Bailey kicked a 45-yard field goal to decrease the margin to ten points at halftime. Late in the third quarter, Diggs caught a two-yard touchdown pass from Cousins. The Bears responded with a 16-play drive that lasted a season-long 9:05 and saw the offense convert all four third-down situations; the possession culminated in Cohen's three-yard touchdown run. On the ensuing conversion, running a play dubbed "Lollipop" that saw Amukamara sprint along the line of scrimmage before the snap, Trubisky completed a throw to Kwiatkoski for two points. Parkey later kicked a 42-yard field goal to put the Bears up by 14 points. The game's final three drives resulted in turnovers on downs before Trubisky kneeled once to conclude the 24–10 win.

With the triumph, Chicago improved to 12–4, their best record since a 13–3 campaign in 2006. The win marked the Bears' first in Minnesota since 2011, while it was also the first season since that year in which they swept the Vikings. With the Rams defeating the 49ers, the Bears were locked into the third seed and a wild-card game. The victory also helped clinch a playoff spot for the Philadelphia Eagles, who ended the regular season 9–7 after defeating the Washington Redskins earlier in the day and needed a Chicago victory to pass the Vikings for the final playoff slot.

=== Standings ===
==== Division ====
NFC North
	W	L	T	PCT	DIV	CONF	PF	PA	STK
^{(3)} Chicago Bears	12	4	0	.750	5–1	10–2	421	283	W4
Minnesota Vikings	8	7	1	.531	3–2–1	6–5–1	360	341	L1
Green Bay Packers	6	9	1	.406	1–4–1	3–8–1	376	400	L1
Detroit Lions	6	10	0	.375	2–4	4–8	324	360	W1

==== Conference ====
NFC
#	Team	Division	W	L	T	PCT	DIV	CONF	SOS	SOV	STK
**Division leaders**
1 (Note: New Orleans finished ahead of LA Rams based on head-to-head victory, claiming the No. 1 seed.)	New Orleans Saints	South	13	3	0	.813	4–2	9–3	.482	.488	L1
2	Los Angeles Rams	West	13	3	0	.813	6–0	9–3	.480	.428	W2
3	Chicago Bears	North	12	4	0	.750	5–1	10–2	.430	.419	W4
4	Dallas Cowboys	East	10	6	0	.625	5–1	9–3	.488	.444	W2
**Wild Cards**
5	Seattle Seahawks	West	10	6	0	.625	3–3	8–4	.484	.400	W2
6	Philadelphia Eagles	East	9	7	0	.563	4–2	6–6	.518	.486	W3
**Did not qualify for the postseason**
7	Minnesota Vikings	North	8	7	1	.531	3–2–1	6–5–1	.504	.355	L1
8 (Note: Atlanta finished ahead of Washington based on head-to-head victory. Atlanta finished ahead of Carolina based on head-to-head sweep. Washington finished ahead of Carolina based on head-to-head victory.)	Atlanta Falcons	South	7	9	0	.438	4–2	7–5	.482	.348	W3
9	Washington Redskins	East	7	9	0	.438	2–4	6–6	.486	.371	L2
10	Carolina Panthers	South	7	9	0	.438	2–4	5–7	.508	.518	W1
11	Green Bay Packers	North	6	9	1	.406	1–4–1	3–8–1	.488	.417	L1
12	Detroit Lions	North	6	10	0	.375	2–4	4–8	.504	.427	W1
13 (Note: NY Giants finished ahead of Tampa Bay based on head-to-head victory.)	New York Giants	East	5	11	0	.313	1–5	4–8	.527	.487	L3
14	Tampa Bay Buccaneers	South	5	11	0	.313	2–4	4–8	.523	.506	L4
15	San Francisco 49ers	West	4	12	0	.250	1–5	2–10	.504	.406	L2
16	Arizona Cardinals	West	3	13	0	.188	2–4	3–9	.527	.302	L4
**Tiebreakers** (Note: When breaking ties for three or more teams under the NFL's rules, they are first broken within divisions, then comparing only the highest-ranked remaining team from each division.)

== Postseason ==
Playoff round	Date	Opponent	Result	Record	Game site	NFL.com GameBook	NFL.com recap
Wild Card	January 6, 2019	Philadelphia Eagles (6)	L 15–16	0–1	Soldier Field	GameBook	Recap

=== NFC Wild Card Playoffs: vs. (6) Philadelphia Eagles ===
NFC Wild Card Playoffs: (6) Philadelphia Eagles at (3) Chicago Bears – Game summary

Quarter	1	2	3	4	Total
Eagles	3	0	7	6	16
Bears	0	6	0	9	15

at Soldier Field, Chicago, Illinois

- Date: January 6, 2019
- Game time: 3:40 p.m. CST
- Game weather: 39 °F (4 °C), mostly cloudy
- Game attendance: 62,462
- Referee: Tony Corrente
- TV announcers (NBC): Al Michaels, Cris Collinsworth and Michele Tafoya, Terry McAulay
- Recap, Gamebook

Game information

First quarter

- PHI – Jake Elliott 43-yard field goal, 9:37. Eagles 3–0. Drive: 10 plays, 50 yards, 5:28.

Second quarter

- CHI – Cody Parkey 36-yard field goal, 9:42. Tied 3–3. Drive: 8 plays, 47 yards, 4:43.
- CHI – Cody Parkey 29-yard field goal, 0:03. Bears 6–3. Drive: 13 plays, 78 yards, 2:38.

Third quarter

- PHI – Dallas Goedert 10-yard pass from Nick Foles (Jake Elliott kick), 5:20. Eagles 10–6. Drive: 7 plays, 83 yards, 4:23.

Fourth quarter

- CHI – Cody Parkey 34-yard field goal, 14:13. Eagles 10–9. Drive: 6 plays, 62 yards, 2:20.
- CHI – Allen Robinson 22-yard pass from Mitchell Trubisky (2-point pass failed), 9:04. Bears 15–10. Drive: 6 plays, 80 yards, 2:56.
- PHI – Golden Tate 2-yard pass from Nick Foles (2-point rush failed), 0:56. Eagles 16–15. Drive: 12 yards, 60 yards, 3:52.

Top passers

- PHI – Nick Foles – 25/40, 266 yards, 2 TD, 2 INT
- CHI – Mitchell Trubisky – 26/43, 303 yards, TD

Top rushers

- PHI – Darren Sproles – 13 rushes, 21 yards
- CHI – Jordan Howard – 10 rushes, 35 yards

Top receivers

- PHI – Alshon Jeffery – 6 receptions, 83 yards
- CHI – Allen Robinson – 10 receptions, 143 yards, TD

The Bears' first playoff game since the 2010 season saw them host the Super Bowl LII champion Eagles, led by backup quarterback and Super Bowl MVP Nick Foles. In the all-time series, the Bears led 30–14–1, but had lost the last three meetings; Chicago was also 1–2 in postseason games, with the latest game being a home defeat in 2001. Stankevitz projected the game to be determined at the line of scrimmage, especially with an Eagles defensive line featuring Fletcher Cox (10.5 sacks in 2018), Michael Bennett (9 sacks), and ends Chris Long and Brandon Graham (combined for 10.5). In contrast, the Bears' offensive line was ranked second by Pro Football Focus in pass blocking. For the Bears' defense, they faced a Philadelphia offensive line that allowed just one combined sack against star defenders like Aaron Donald, J. J. Watt, and Jadeveon Clowney. Stankevitz also wrote of the Chicago defense's success in preventing long drives, especially at home, while Trubisky could overcome turnovers provided he was consistent. In predicting a Bears win, Stankevitz wrote, "It would take an uncharacteristically poor game for the Bears to lose on Sunday, and all week players and coaches have given off signs that they're not merely happy to be in the playoffs." Following a team vote, Trubisky and Whitehair (offense), Hicks and Mack (defense), and Cohen and Cunningham (special teams) were named the team captains for the playoffs.

Jake Elliott kicked a 43-yard field goal on the opening drive. After three drives that resulted in punts, Foles was intercepted by Smith, which set up Parkey's 36-yard field goal in the second quarter to tie the game. A drive later, Foles was picked off by Amos in the Bears' end zone, though the Bears were forced to punt on the resulting series. Parkey booted a 29-yard kick to end the first half with the 6–3 lead. In the third quarter, the Eagles were aided by two critical Bears penalties – a 15-yard unnecessary roughness on Amos and a 33-yard defensive pass interference on Amukamara – as Foles threw a ten-yard touchdown to Dallas Goedert. Early in the final period, Parkey's 34-yard field goal narrowed the margin to one point, which was followed by Trubisky throwing a 22-yard touchdown pass to Robinson on Chicago's next possession. However, Gabriel was stopped on the two-point conversion. Following two punts, Philadelphia marched into Chicago's territory; with 56 seconds remaining in the game and on fourth down from the Bears' two, Foles completed the score to Golden Tate to take the lead. Darren Sproles failed to score on the conversion to make the score 16–15 in Philadelphia's favor. Cohen returned the ensuing kickoff 35 yards to the Bears' 42, from which Trubisky led the offense as far as the Eagles' 25. After the Eagles used their final timeout with ten seconds left, Parkey's potential game-winning 43-yard kick was partially tipped by Eagles tackle Treyvon Hester, which caused the ball to shift and hit the left upright and crossbar before bouncing into the end zone. Foles kneeled once to end the game.

"It's one of the worst feelings in the world to let your team down," Parkey said after the game. "I feel terrible. Continue to put things into perspective, continue to just put my best foot forward and just sleep at night knowing that I did everything in my power this week to make that kick and for whatever reason it hit the crossbar and the upright."

== End of season ==
Following the playoff exit, the Bears ended the season with a 12–4 record. After going 5–11 in 2017, the improvement in 2018 marked the team's best single-season turnaround since going from five to 13 wins in 2001. The 12 wins under Nagy were the most by a new head coach in Bears history and the best rookie campaign among the 32 active coaches at the time, surpassing McVay and John Harbaugh (Baltimore Ravens) who had 11 in their first seasons.

Despite failing to advance past the first round, fans and media lauded the team's entertainment value in its trick plays, defensive touchdowns, and off-field activities. The NFL loosened rules regarding group celebrations in 2017, which allowed for teams like the Bears to perform elaborate gestures to celebrate turnovers and scores. Celebrations that particularly garnered attention included Jackson conducting a symphony after his Week 11 touchdown and Amukamara and the defense emulating the Detroit Motown music scene following Fuller's game-winning interception in Week 12. To celebrate wins, with inspiration from the Chicago Cubs, the team began holding a dance party called "Club Dub" that included lights and a disco ball; "dub" is a slang term for "win". The rap song "Swag Surfin'" by Fast Life Yungstaz also became an unofficial anthem of Club Dub. Nagy's post-victory speeches were highlighted by him saying the word "Boom!" while driving his arm into the ground like a football spike, and the action developed into an informal rallying cry for the team. Trubisky explained such moments made the "experience so much better. It's become something very special for this team."

=== Statistics ===
Under Nagy, the Bears offense recorded 421 total points in 2018, the ninth-most in the league. The passing game's 28 combined touchdowns between Trubisky and Daniel ranked 17th, while the 17 rushing touchdowns were the tenth-highest.

The defense, whose authority was fully relinquished to Fangio after Nagy took over as head coach, was among the highest-rated in the NFL; the unit led the league in multiple categories like average points allowed per game (17.7), turnovers forced (36), interceptions (27), interceptions returned for touchdowns (5), opposing passer rating (72.9), and rushing yards allowed per game (80.0). With the defense's success, Fangio was hired as the Denver Broncos head coach in 2019.

== Awards ==
Five players received weekly honors on six occasions during the regular season. In week four against the Buccaneers, Trevathan recorded two sacks, eight tackles, and a forced fumble to be named NFC Defensive Player of the Week, while Trubisky's six-touchdown game earned him FedEx Air Player of the Week. Six weeks later against the Lions, Trubisky completed 23 of 30 passes for 355 yards, three touchdowns (along with one rushing), no interceptions, a career-best 76.7 completion percentage, and a 148.6 rating (the second-highest of the season behind the Buccaneers game) to win FedEx Air Player of the Week and NFC Offensive Player of the Week. Parkey's week eleven performance versus Minnesota earned him NFC Special Teams Player of the Week, while Jackson's game-winning pick-six in Detroit the following week granted him Defensive Player of the Week. In the season finale in Minnesota, Howard recorded a season-best 109 rushing yards, including a season-long 42-yard run on his first carry, and two touchdowns to win FedEx Ground Player of the Week.

In September and November, Mack and Jackson were named NFC Defensive Player of the Month, respectively. It was Mack's second career DPOM honor since he won the AFC's in November 2016 as he had a strip-sack in each of September's four games, becoming the first player to record such a stat in four straight games since Robert Mathis of the 2005 Indianapolis Colts. He was also the first Bear to receive the accolade since Charles Tillman in October 2012 and the seventh in team history. During November, Jackson recorded 15 tackles, two interceptions, a forced fumble and recover, and three defensive touchdowns.

After no Bears made the Pro Bowl for the 2017 season, five were named to the 2019 Pro Bowl in December 2018. While no offensive players were elected originally, Cohen was voted as a kick returner; Mack, Hicks, Fuller, and Jackson were voted in on defense. Trubisky, Trey Burton, Floyd, Leno, Smith, Trevathan, and Whitehair were designated as alternates for the game. Following the Rams' NFC Championship Game win to advance to Super Bowl LIII, Trubisky formally replaced Jared Goff on the Pro Bowl roster, making him the first Bears quarterback to play in the all-star game since Jim McMahon in 1986. Leno and Whitehair later joined their teammates to increase the Bears Pro Bowler count to eight, their most since 2006.

On January 4, 2019, a league-high four Bears were named to the All-Pro team: Cohen, Fuller, Jackson, and Mack were all on the first team. It was the first All-Pro honor for Cohen (who was named as a punt returner), Fuller, and Jackson, while Mack received his third. For the team, it was Chicago's first All-Pro since Long was named second-team in 2014, while their last first-team nominations were Tillman and Brandon Marshall in 2012; it was also the Bears' first four-player All-Pro effort since 2006 with Brian Urlacher, Devin Hester, Olin Kreutz, and Robbie Gould. The Pro Football Writers Association also the four to their All-NFL team.

Nagy and Fangio were named Coach of the Year and Assistant coach of the Year, respectively, by two agencies: the PFWA on January 17, and the Associated Press at the 8th NFL Honors on February 2. On March 25, Ryan Pace was named Executive of the Year by the Sporting News, becoming the third Bears general manager to win the award after George Halas in 1956 and Michael McCaskey in 1985.
