= Andre Tucker =

American football Trainer

Chicago Bears
- Title: Head Athletic Trainer

Career information
- College: Florida International

Career history
- Miami Dolphins (2003) Seasonal Intern Athletic Trainer; Jacksonville Jaguars (2004–2008) Assistant Athletic Trainer; Atlanta Falcons (2008–2010) Assistant Athletic Trainer; Cleveland Browns (2010–2018) Assistant Athletic Trainer; Chicago Bears (2018–present) Head Athletic Trainer

Andre Tucker is an American football Trainer and currently the Head Athletic Trainer for the Chicago Bears of the National Football League (NFL). He was previously Assistant Head Athletic Trainer for the Miami Dolphins, the Jacksonville Jaguars, the Atlanta Falcons and the Cleveland Browns.
