= Dallas Goedert =

American football player (born 1995)

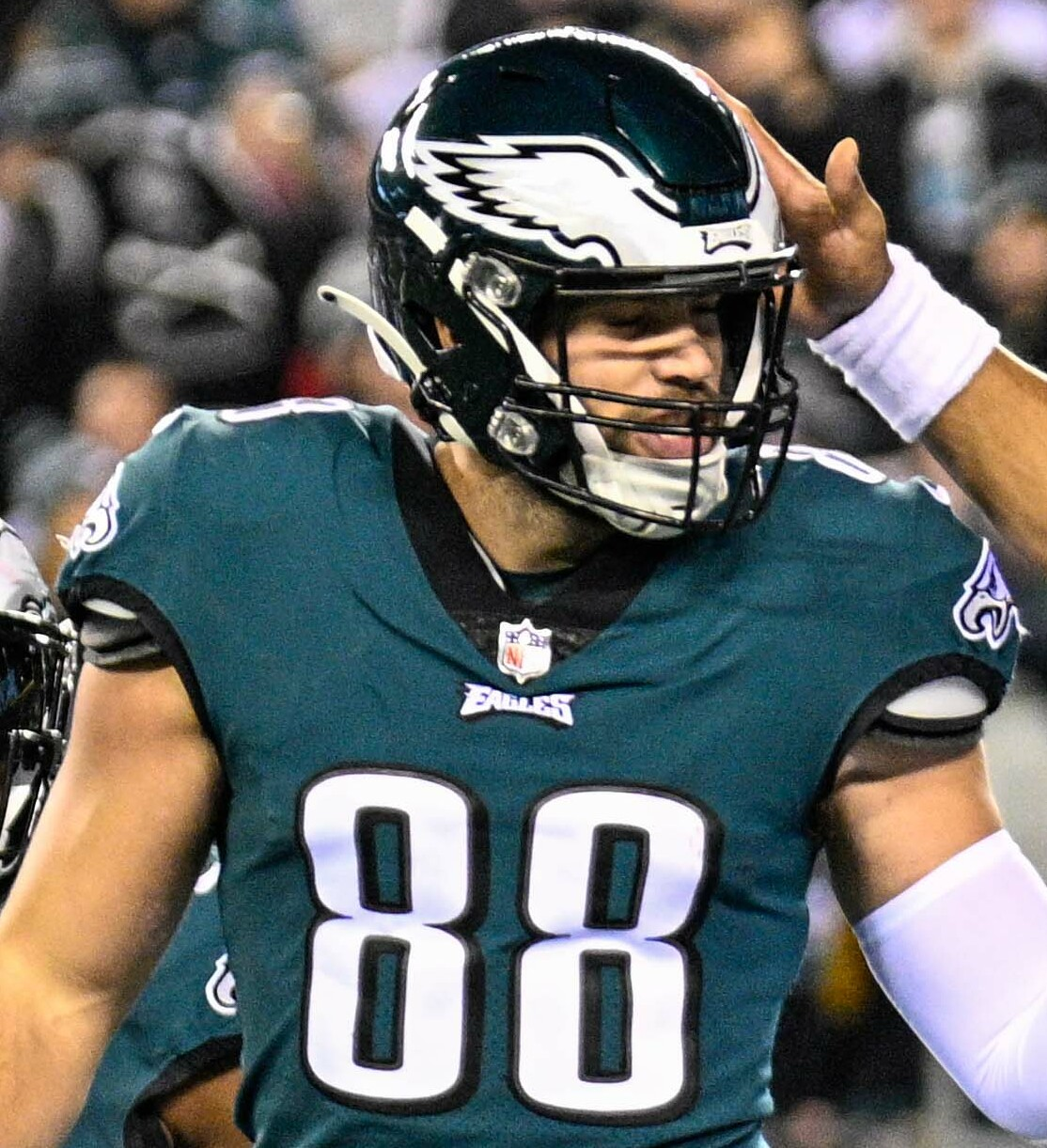
- Goedert with the Philadelphia Eagles in 2022

No. 88 – Philadelphia Eagles
- Position: Tight end
- Roster status: Active

Personal information
- Born: January 3, 1995 (age 31); Aberdeen, South Dakota, U.S.
- Listed height: 6 ft 5 in (1.96 m)
- Listed weight: 256 lb (116 kg)

Career information
- High school: Britton-Hecla (Britton, South Dakota)
- College: South Dakota State (2013–2017)
- NFL draft: 2018: 2nd round, 49th overall pick

Career history
- Philadelphia Eagles (2018–present)

Awards and highlights
- Super Bowl champion (LIX); First-team FCS All-American (2016, 2017); 3× First-team All-MVFC (2015–2017)

Career NFL statistics as of 2025
- Receptions: 414
- Receiving yards: 4,753
- Receiving touchdowns: 37
- Stats at Pro Football Reference

Dallas Christopher Goedert (/ˈɡɒdərt/ GOD-ərt; born January 3, 1995) is an American professional football tight end for the Philadelphia Eagles of the National Football League (NFL). He played college football for the South Dakota State Jackrabbits, and was selected by the Eagles in the second round of the 2018 NFL draft.

== Early life ==
Goedert attended Britton-Hecla High School in Britton, South Dakota. He played football, soccer, and basketball for the Braves athletic teams in high school. Goedert's father, a huge Dallas Cowboys fan, named Goedert after the team.

== College career ==
Goedert joined South Dakota State University as a walk-on and was with the Jackrabbits from 2013 (he was redshirted as a freshman) to 2017. During his career, Goedert had 198 receptions for 2,988 yards and 21 touchdowns, including two straight 1,000-yard receiving seasons. He started all 14 games in his senior season and was a team captain, totaling 72 catches for 1,111 yards receiving and seven touchdowns. Goedert's collegiate career at South Dakota State saw him as a two-time first-team Football Championship Subdivision (FCS) All-American, and Goedert was a finalist in 2016 for the Walter Payton Award, which recognizes the top player in the FCS. At the end of the 2017 season, Goedert accepted an invitation to play in the 2018 Senior Bowl. However, he was injured during practice and withdrew from the game.

== Professional career ==
External videos
- NFL Draft Profile: Dallas Goedert

Pre-draft measurables
Height	Weight	Arm length	Hand span	Wingspan	40-yard dash	20-yard shuttle	Three-cone drill	Vertical jump	Broad jump	Bench press
6 ft 4 5/8 in (1.95 m)	256 lb (116 kg)	34 in (0.86 m)	10 in (0.25 m)	6 ft 8 1/8 in (2.04 m)	4.67 s	4.31 s	7.02 s	35 in (0.89 m)	10 ft 1 in (3.07 m)	23 reps
All values from NFL Combine/Pro Day

=== 2018 ===
The Philadelphia Eagles selected Goedert in the second round (49th overall) of the 2018 NFL draft. The Eagles traded their second (52nd overall) and fifth round picks (169th overall) to the Indianapolis Colts in order to move up in the second round, ahead of the Cowboys (50th overall), to draft Goedert. It was speculated by draft analysts that the Cowboys were going to possibly draft Goedert as they were in need of a tight end following the retirement of veterans Jason Witten and James Hanna. Goedert was the third tight end drafted in 2018 and was selected as a replacement for Brent Celek, whom the Eagles released on March 13, 2018.

External videos
- Eagles draft Dallas Goedert 49th overall
- Instant Draft Grade: Dallas Goedert

On May 9, 2018, the Eagles signed Goedert to a four-year, $5.62 million contract that includes $2.90 million guaranteed and a signing bonus of $2.17 million. Goedert made his NFL debut in the season-opener against the Atlanta Falcons. In the 18–12 victory, he had a single reception for four yards. Two weeks later against the Indianapolis Colts, Goedert scored his first career touchdown, a 13-yard reception from Carson Wentz. The touchdown as part of a seven-reception, 73-yard performance for Goedert. He scored a receiving touchdown in both Week 7 against the Carolina Panthers and Week 8 against the Jacksonville Jaguars.

Goedert finished his rookie season with 33 receptions for 334 yards and four touchdowns in 16 games and eight starts. In the Wild Card Round of the playoffs against the Chicago Bears, Goedert caught a 10-yard pass in the end zone from Eagles quarterback Nick Foles. The touchdown gave the Eagles a 10–6 lead, on their way to an upset 16–15 road victory. Goedert also made a good play in catching a low pass, breaking a tackle, and running for a first down on another 10-yard reception, during the Eagles' winning touchdown drive.

=== 2019 ===
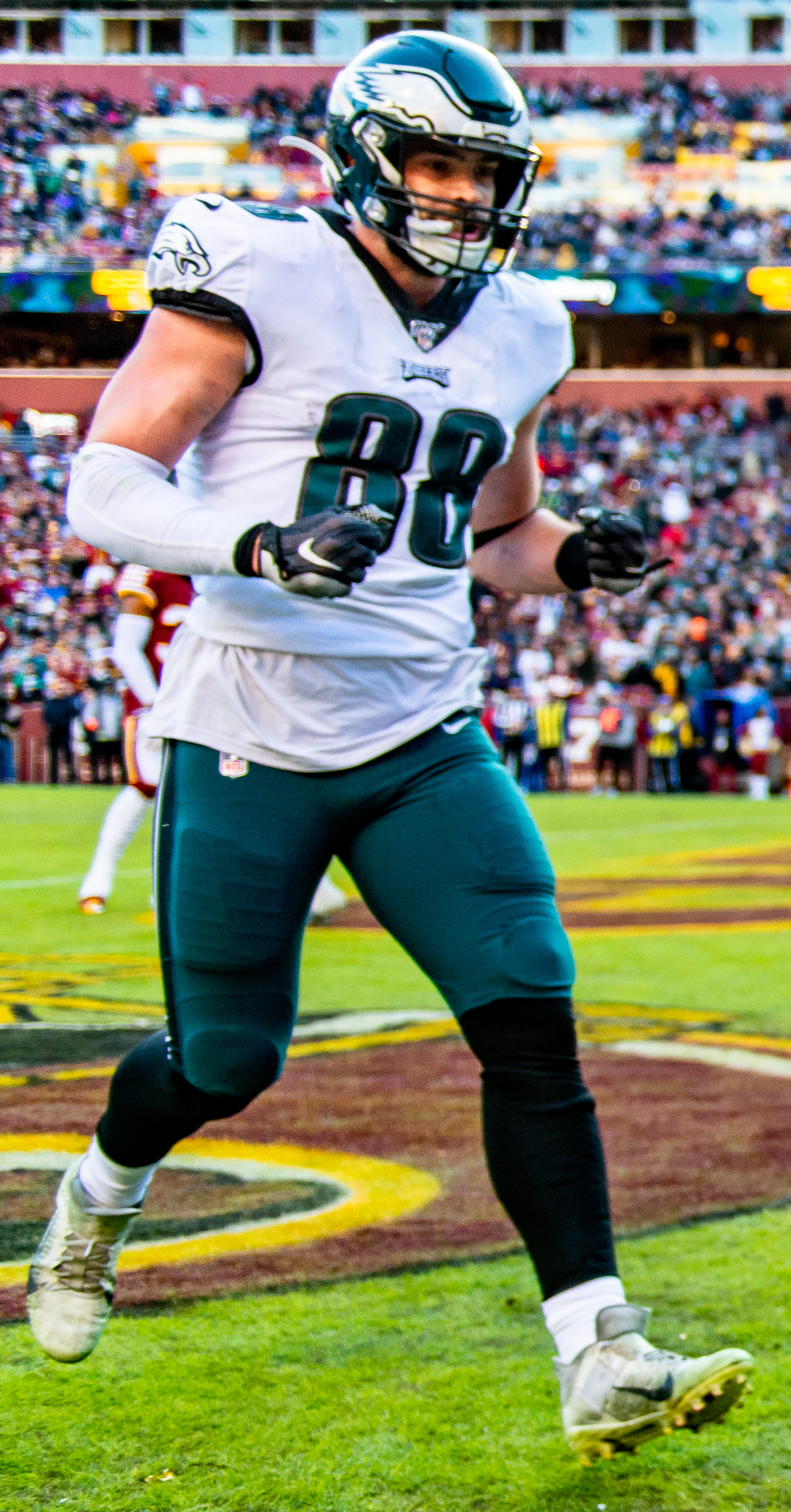
Goedert in 2019

During a Week 16 17–9 victory over the Cowboys, Goedert recorded a career high nine receptions for a career-high 91 yards and was nominated for PFF NFL Week 16 Team of the Week. In a must-win Week 17 matchup against the New York Giants, Goedert contributed to a 34–17 road victory after recording four receptions for 65 yards, clinching the NFC East title for the second time within three seasons.

Goedert finished his second professional season with 58 receptions for 607 yards and five touchdowns in 15 games and nine starts. In the Wild Card Round against the Seattle Seahawks, Goedert recorded seven receptions for 76 yards during a 17–9 loss.

=== 2020 ===
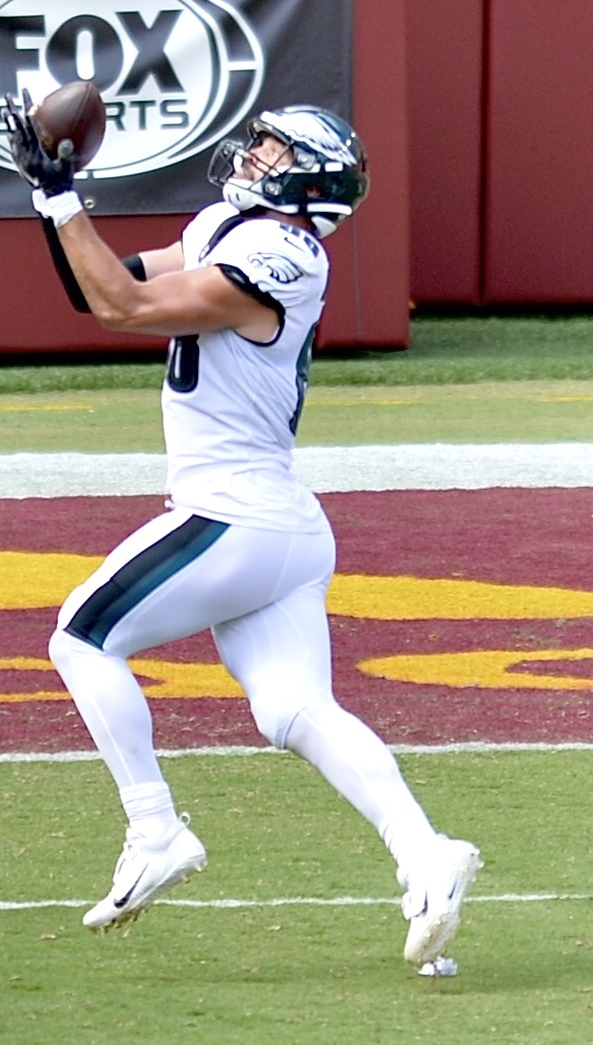
Goedert catching a touchdown in 2020

Goedert was assaulted in a South Dakota bar on June 22, 2020, and briefly received treatment at a hospital.

In the season-opening loss to the Washington Football Team, Goedert had eight receptions for 101 yards and a touchdown. Two weeks later, he suffered an ankle injury and was placed on injured reserve on September 29, 2020. Goedert was activated on October 31, 2020.

In the 2020 season, Goedert had 46 receptions for 524 yards and three touchdowns.

=== 2021 ===
Goedert took over as the Eagles starting tight end following the trade of Zach Ertz in October. On November 19, 2021, Goedert signed a four-year, $57 million extension with the Philadelphia Eagles, with $35 million guaranteed. He was placed on the COVID list on January 3, 2022. In Week 13, he had six receptions for 105 receiving yards and two receiving touchdowns in the 33–18 victory over the New York Jets. In Week 15, he had seven receptions for 135 receiving yards in the 27–17 victory over the Washington Football Team.

Goedert finished the 2021 season with 56 receptions for 830 yards and four touchdowns in 15 games and 14 starts. He was activated a week later on January 10, missing just one game where the Eagles did not play their starters.

=== 2022 ===
Goedert was placed on injured reserve on November 16, 2022, after suffering a shoulder injury as a result of a facemask penalty that went uncalled. He was activated on December 20. Goedert finished the 2022 season with 55 receptions for 702 yards and three touchdowns in 12 games and starts.

Goedert scored a receiving touchdown in the Divisional Round victory over the Giants. Goedert reached Super Bowl LVII where he had six catches for 60 yards, but the Eagles lost 38–35 to the Kansas City Chiefs.

=== 2023 ===
In Week 5 of the 2023 season, Goedert had eight receptions for 117 yards and a touchdown against the Rams in a 23–14 win. In the 2023 season, Goedert appeared in 14 games. He finished with 59 receptions for 592 yards and three touchdowns. He scored a touchdown in the Eagles' 32–9 loss to the Buccaneers in the Wild Card Round.

=== 2024 ===
In Week 3, Goedert set a career high for receiving yards in a game with 170 yards to lead the Eagles to a 15–12 win over the New Orleans Saints.

In Week 6's matchup against the Cleveland Browns, Goedert exited the game due to a hamstring injury that caused him to miss the next three games. He returned in Week 10 and caught his first touchdown of the season in the matchup against the Dallas Cowboys. On December 7, Goedert was placed on injured reserve due to a knee injury sustained during Week 13's matchup against the Baltimore Ravens, with plans for him to return for the playoffs. Prior to the injury, Goedert totaled 441 yards and two touchdowns on 38 receptions. He was activated on January 4, 2025.

On January 12, 2025, Goedert recorded a touchdown during the Wild Card Round playoff game against the Green Bay Packers.

Goedert won Super Bowl LIX on February 9, 2025, recording two receptions for 27 yards in a 40–22 victory against the Kansas City Chiefs.

=== 2025 ===
On May 7, 2025, Goedert agreed to a restructured contract, taking a pay cut to $10 million with $1 million in incentives.

Goedert scored 11 touchdowns in the 2025 regular season, breaking the Eagles' record for most touchdowns by a tight end in a single season, which was previously held by Pete Retzlaff with 10 touchdowns in 1965.

Goedert scored a rushing touchdown and a receiving touchdown in the Eagles' 23–19 loss to the San Francisco 49ers in the Wild Card Round, becoming the first tight end in NFL history to score a rushing touchdown in the postseason.

=== 2026 ===
On March 15, 2026, after going unsigned the first week of free agency, Goedert would sign a one-year, $7 million contract to return to the Eagles.

== NFL career statistics ==
Legend
	Won the Super Bowl
**Bold**	Career high

=== Regular season ===
Season	Team	Games		Receiving					Fumbles	
Season	Team	GP	GS	Rec	Yds	Avg	Lng	TD	Fum	Lost
2018	PHI	**16**	8	33	334	10.1	32	4	0	0
2019	PHI	15	9	58	607	10.5	28	5	**2**	**2**
2020	PHI	11	9	46	524	11.4	41	3	0	0
2021	PHI	15	14	56	**830**	**14.8**	45	4	1	0
2022	PHI	12	12	55	702	12.8	31	3	1	1
2023	PHI	14	14	59	592	10.0	49	3	0	0
2024	PHI	10	10	42	496	11.8	**61**	2	**2**	0
2025	PHI	15	**15**	**60**	591	9.9	36	**11**	0	0
Career		108	91	349	4,085	11.4	61	35	6	3

=== Playoffs ===
Season	Team	Games		Receiving					Fumbles	
Season	Team	GP	GS	Rec	Yds	Avg	Lng	TD	Fum	Lost
2018	PHI	2	0	2	20	10.0	10	**1**	0	0
2019	PHI	1	1	7	73	10.4	17	0	0	0
2021	PHI	1	1	6	92	**15.3**	28	0	0	0
2022	PHI	3	3	16	141	8.8	23	**1**	0	0
2023	PHI	1	1	4	21	5.3	10	**1**	0	0
2024	PHI	**4**	**4**	**17**	**215**	12.6	**31**	**1**	0	0
2025	PHI	1	1	4	33	8.3	15	**1**	0	0
Career		13	11	56	595	10.6	31	5	0	0

== Personal life ==
Goedert has plaque psoriasis.
