= 2018 Philadelphia Eagles season =

86th season in franchise history

- Owner: Jeffrey Lurie
- General manager: Howie Roseman
- Head coach: Doug Pederson
- Offensive coordinator: Mike Groh
- Defensive coordinator: Jim Schwartz
- Home stadium: Lincoln Financial Field

Results
- Record: 9–7
- Division place: 2nd NFC East
- Playoffs: Won Wild Card Playoffs (at Bears) 16–15; Lost Divisional Playoffs (at Saints) 14–20
- Pro Bowlers: TE Zach Ertz; OG Brandon Brooks; DT Fletcher Cox; SS Malcolm Jenkins; OT Lane Johnson

Uniform
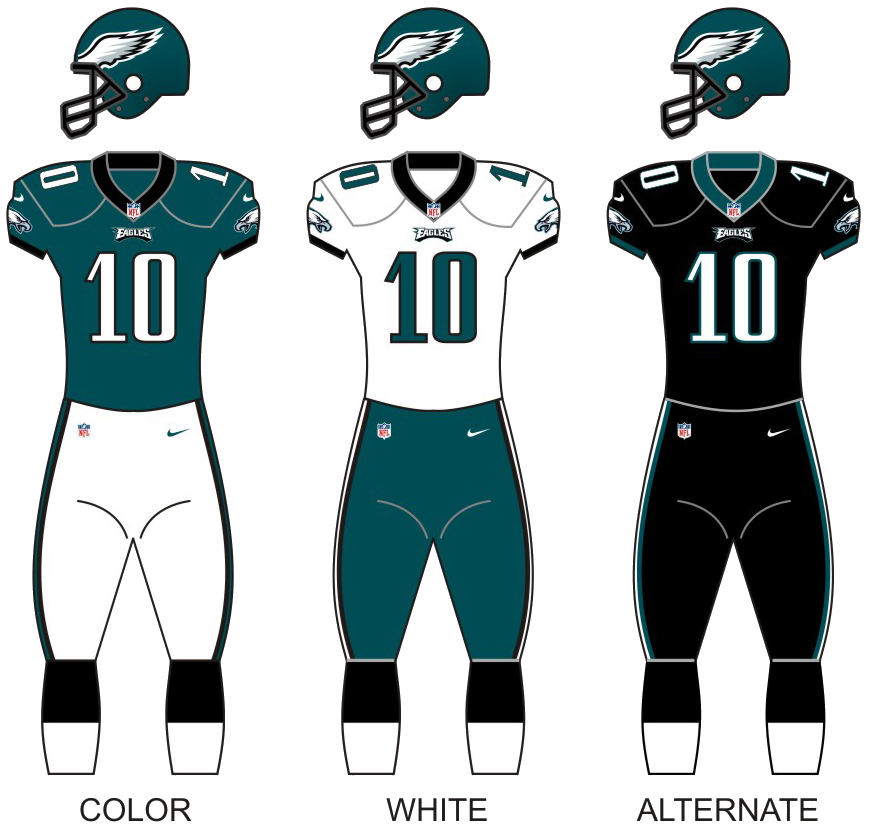

The 2018 season was the Philadelphia Eagles' 86th season in the National Football League (NFL), their 25th under the ownership of Jeffrey Lurie and their third under head coach Doug Pederson.

The Eagles entered the season as the defending champions of Super Bowl LII, when they defeated the previous defending Super Bowl champion New England Patriots 41–33 and attempted to become the first team since the 2004 New England Patriots and the first NFC team since division rival 1993 Dallas Cowboys to repeat as Super Bowl Champions. They opened the season with the NFL Kickoff Game on September 6, beating the Atlanta Falcons 18–12. A vast majority of their Super Bowl-winning squad from the 2017 season was retained, although some notable losses included tight end Trey Burton (who contributed to the Philly Special in the Super Bowl), defensive end Vinny Curry, and cornerback Patrick Robinson. Franchise quarterback Carson Wentz, who had been injured late in the 2017 season, returned as a starter in Week 3, but a back injury would bump him down as the number 3 quarterback instead of being placed on injured reserve, and Nick Foles would start in his place for the remainder of the season. In addition, they lost defensive back Chris Maragos, who had been with the team since 2014, to retirement, and linebacker Joe Walker left to go to Arizona.

The Eagles struggled through the first three months of the season to a 4–6 record, with inconsistent play and multiple injuries to players such as safety Rodney McLeod and running back Jay Ajayi. With a 21–17 loss to the Carolina Panthers in Week 7, the Eagles failed to improve or match their 13–3 record from the previous season. The Eagles also made history in Week 11 with a 48–7 loss in New Orleans, the largest loss by a defending Super Bowl champion in league history. Despite this, the Eagles proceeded to win 5 of their last 6 games, including two division wins over the New York Giants and the Washington Redskins to move to 9–7. A three-game win streak to end the season which included upset wins over the Rams, Texans, and Redskins helped the Eagles make the playoffs with a Vikings loss to the Bears. This is the first time the Eagles made the playoffs in back to back seasons since the 2008–10 seasons.

The Eagles played in their first NFL Kickoff Game and their first game at London's Wembley Stadium in franchise history.

In the playoffs, the Eagles upset the third-seeded Chicago Bears 16–15 in the wild-card round to advance to the Divisional round, where they narrowly lost 20–14 to the top-seeded New Orleans Saints, ending their hopes of defending their Super Bowl title. The Eagles were the first defending champions to win a postseason game on the road since the 2004 Patriots.

== Roster changes ==
=== Free agents ===
Position	Player	Tag	2018 team	Notes
DT	Beau Allen	UFA	Tampa Bay Buccaneers	Signed 3-year, $15 million deal
RB	Kenjon Barner	UFA	Carolina Panthers	Signed 1-year deal
OT	Will Beatty	UFA		
RB	LeGarrette Blount	UFA	Detroit Lions	Signed 1 year, $4.5 million deal
LB	Nigel Bradham	UFA	Philadelphia Eagles	Signed 5-year, $40 million deal
DE	Bryan Braman	UFA		
TE	Trey Burton	UFA	Chicago Bears	Signed 4-year, $32 million deal
LB	Dannell Ellerbe	UFA		
LB	Najee Goode	UFA	Indianapolis Colts	Signed 1-year deal
S	Corey Graham	UFA	Philadelphia Eagles	Signed 1-year deal
CB	Patrick Robinson	UFA	New Orleans Saints	Signed 4-year, $20 million deal
RB	Darren Sproles	UFA	Philadelphia Eagles	Signed 1-year, $1.415 million deal
K	Caleb Sturgis	UFA	Los Angeles Chargers	Signed 2-year, $4.45 million deal
S	Jaylen Watkins	UFA	Los Angeles Chargers	Signed 1-year deal

Player re-signed by the Eagles

=== Signings ===
Position	Player	Tag	2017 team	Date signed	Notes
LB	Corey Nelson	UFA	Denver Broncos	March 14	Signed 1-year, $2.25 million deal
DT	Haloti Ngata	UFA	Detroit Lions	March 15	Signed 1-year, $2.6 million deal
WR	Mike Wallace	UFA	Baltimore Ravens	March 22	Signed 1-year, $2.5 million deal
LB	Paul Worrilow	UFA	Detroit Lions	April 3	Signed 1-year deal
TE	Richard Rodgers	UFA	Green Bay Packers	April 4	Signed 1-year deal
WR	Markus Wheaton	UFA	Chicago Bears	May 2	Signed 1-year deal
QB	Joe Callahan	UFA	Green Bay Packers	May 7	Signed 2-year deal
RB	Matt Jones	UFA	Indianapolis Colts	May 9	Signed 2-year deal
LB	LaRoy Reynolds	UFA	Atlanta Falcons	May 15	Signed 1-year deal
WR	Kamar Aiken	UFA	Indianapolis Colts	July 25	Signed 1-year deal
WR	DeAndre Carter	UFA	San Francisco 49ers	July 28	Signed 1-year deal
TE	Gannon Sinclair	UFA	Jacksonville Jaguars	August 5	Signed 1-year deal
QB	Christian Hackenberg	UFA	Oakland Raiders	August 12	Signed 1-year deal
WR	Darius Prince	N/A	Philadelphia Soul	August 18	Signed 1-year deal
S	Deshawntee Gallon	UFA	Arizona Cardinals	August 27	Signed 1-year deal
TE	Anthony Denham	UFA	Arizona Cardinals	August 28	Signed 1-year deal

=== Departures ===
Position	Player	2018 team	Date	Reason
P	Donnie Jones	Los Angeles Chargers	April 4	Released
TE	Brent Celek	N/A	March 13	Retired
DE	Vinny Curry	Tampa Bay Buccaneers	March 16	Released
CB	Daryl Worley	Oakland Raiders	April 15	Released
LB	Mychal Kendricks	Seattle Seahawks	May 22	Released
WR	Marquess Wilson	TBA	July 24	Released
CB	Randall Goforth	TBA	July 24	Released
TE	Adam Zaruba	TBA	August 11	Released
LB	Corey Nelson	TBA	August 26	Released

=== Trades ===
- March 14: The Eagles traded WR Marcus Johnson and a fifth-round draft pick in the 2018 NFL draft to the Seattle Seahawks for DE Michael Bennett and a 7th-round draft pick.
- March 14: The Eagles traded WR Torrey Smith to the Carolina Panthers for CB Daryl Worley.
- October 30: The Eagles traded a 2019 third-round pick to the Detroit Lions for WR Golden Tate.

== Draft ==
2018 Philadelphia Eagles draft
Round	Pick	Player	Position	College	Notes
2	49	Dallas Goedert	TE	South Dakota State	From Indianapolis via Seattle and NY Jets
4	125	Avonte Maddox	CB	Pittsburgh	From Baltimore
4	130	Josh Sweat *	DE	Florida State	From Minnesota
6	206	Matt Pryor	OT	Texas Christian	
7	233	Jordan Mailata *	OT		From New England via Arizona and Kansas City
Made roster † Pro Football Hall of Fame * Made at least one Pro Bowl during career

Draft trades

- The Eagles traded their second-round selection (64th overall), first-, third- and fourth-round selections in 2016 (8th, 77th and 100th overall), and their first-round selection in 2017 (12th overall) to Cleveland in exchange for Cleveland's first-round selection in 2016 (2nd overall) and a fourth-round selection in 2017 (139th overall).
- The Eagles traded their third-round selection (96th overall) and wide receiver Jordan Matthews to Buffalo in exchange for cornerback Ronald Darby.
- The Eagles traded quarterback Sam Bradford to Minnesota in exchange for Minnesota's fourth-round selection (130th overall) and a first-round selection in 2017 (14th overall).
- The Eagles traded cornerback Eric Rowe to New England in exchange for a conditional fourth-round selection (131st overall).
- The Eagles traded a fourth-round selection (131st overall) to Miami in exchange for running back Jay Ajayi.
- The Eagles traded their seventh-round selection (250th overall) and offensive tackle Matt Tobin to Seattle in exchange for Seattle's fifth-round selection (156th overall). The two sides later returned these selections to each other with the trade of Michael Bennett
- The Eagles traded their first-round selection (32nd overall), and their fourth-round selection (132nd overall) to the Baltimore Ravens in exchange for a 2nd-round draft pick (52nd overall), a fourth-round pick (125th overall), and a 2nd-round pick in the 2019 NFL Draft.
- The Eagles traded their second-round selection (52nd overall) and their fifth-round selection (169th overall) to the Baltimore Ravens in exchange for a second-round draft pick (49th overall).

Undrafted free agents
Player	Position	College
Jeremy Reaves	S	South Alabama
Josh Adams	RB	Notre Dame
Toby Weathersby	OT	LSU
Joe Ostman	DE	Central Michigan
Dominick Sanders	S	Georgia
Chandon Sullivan	CB	Georgia State
Jordan Thomas	CB	Oklahoma
Stephen Roberts	S	Auburn
Bruce Hector	DT	South Florida
Anthony Mahoungou	WR	Purdue
Asantay Brown	LB	Western Michigan
Aaron Evans	OT	UCF
Ryan Neal	S	Southern Illinois
Ian Park	OG	Slippery Rock
Danny Ezechukwu	DE	Purdue
Tim Wilson	WR	East Stroudsburg
Kyle Wilson	LB	Arkansas State
Adam Reth	DT	Northern Iowa
Jaboree Williams	LB	Wake Forest

== Staff ==
2018 Philadelphia Eagles staff
Front office: Chairman/CEO – Jeffrey Lurie; President – Don Smolenski; Executive vice president of football operations – Howie Roseman; Senior football advisor – Tom Donahoe; Vice president of player personnel – Joe Douglas; Director of player personnel – Andy Weidl; Vice president of football operations and strategy – Alec Halaby; Senior director of college scouting – Anthony Patch; Director of college scouting – Ian Cunningham; Assistant director of college scouting – Alan Wolking; Director of pro scouting – Dwayne Joseph; Assistant director of pro scouting – Brandon Brown; Vice president of football administration – Jake Rosenberg; Director of football operations – Jon Ferrari; Director of team travel & football logistics – Dan Ryan; Player personnel executive – T. J. McCreight; National scout – Patrick Stewart; Assistant director of football analytics – Taylor Rajack; Head coaches: Head coach – Doug Pederson; Assistant head coach/running backs – Duce Staley; Offensive coaches: Offensive coordinator – Mike Groh; Quarterbacks – Press Taylor; Wide receivers – Gunter Brewer; Assistant wide receivers – Carson Walch; Tight ends – Justin Peelle; Offensive line/run game coordinator – Jeff Stoutland; Assistant offensive line/tight ends/run game – Eugene Chung; Offensive quality control/assistant quarterbacks – Spencer Phillips; Offensive quality control/assistant running backs – Trent Miles; Offensive quality control/assistant offensive line – T. J. Paganetti	Defensive coaches: Defensive coordinator – Jim Schwartz; Defensive line – Chris Wilson; Linebackers – Ken Flajole; Secondary – Cory Undlin; Safeties – Tim Hauck; Defensive quality control/assistant defensive line – Phillip Daniels; Defensive quality control/assistant linebackers – Ryan Paganetti; Defensive quality control/assistant secondary – Dino Vasso; Special teams coaches: Special teams coordinator – Dave Fipp; Assistant special teams – Matthew Harper; Strength and conditioning: Head strength coach – Josh Hingst; Assistant strength coach – Keith Gray; Performance nutrition coordinator – Michael Minnis; Strength assistant – Ben Wagner; Director of high performance – Shaun Huls

== Roster ==
2018 Philadelphia Eagles roster
Quarterbacks (QB): 9 Nick Foles; 7 Nate Sudfeld; 11 Carson Wentz; Running backs (RB): 33 Josh Adams; 49 Boston Scott; 28 Wendell Smallwood; 43 Darren Sproles; Wide receivers (WR): 13 Nelson Agholor; 18 Shelton Gibson; 17 Alshon Jeffery; 80 Jordan Matthews; 19 Golden Tate; 14 Mike Wallace; Tight ends (TE): 86 Zach Ertz; 88 Dallas Goedert; 82 Richard Rodgers	Offensive linemen (OL): 79 Brandon Brooks G; 65 Lane Johnson T; 62 Jason Kelce C; 71 Jason Peters T; 69 Matt Pryor G; 73 Isaac Seumalo G; 72 Halapoulivaati Vaitai T; 67 Chance Warmack G; 61 Stefen Wisniewski G; Defensive linemen (DL): 77 Michael Bennett DE; 91 Fletcher Cox DT; 55 Brandon Graham DE; 74 Daeshon Hall DE; 98 Bruce Hector DT; 90 Treyvon Hester DT; 93 Timmy Jernigan DT; 56 Chris Long DE; 94 Haloti Ngata DT	Linebackers (LB): 57 D. J. Alexander OLB; 59 B. J. Bello OLB; 53 Nigel Bradham OLB; 47 Nate Gerry OLB; 54 Kamu Grugier-Hill OLB; 58 Jordan Hicks MLB; 50 LaRoy Reynolds MLB; Defensive backs (DB): 32 Rasul Douglas CB; 24 Corey Graham SS; 36 Deiondre' Hall FS; 48 Josh Hawkins CB; 27 Malcolm Jenkins FS; 22 Sidney Jones CB; 34 Cre'Von LeBlanc CB; 29 Avonte Maddox CB; 37 Tre Sullivan SS; Special teams (ST): 4 Jake Elliott K; 1 Cameron Johnston P; 45 Rick Lovato LS	Practice squad: 52 Asantay Brown OLB; 63 Anthony Fabiano C; 78 Kaleb Johnson G; 38 Jeremiah McKinnon CB; 89 Braxton Miller WR; 84 Dorren Miller WR; 95 Joe Ostman DE; 35 Donnel Pumphrey RB; 39 Chandon Sullivan CB; 85 Will Tye TE; Reserve: 26 Jay Ajayi RB (IR); 96 Derek Barnett DE (IR); -- Elie Bouka CB (IR); 30 Corey Clement RB (IR); 21 Ronald Darby CB (IR); 10 Mack Hollins WR (IR); 68 Jordan Mailata T (IR); 42 Chris Maragos FS (PUP); 23 Rodney McLeod SS (IR); 31 Jalen Mills CB (IR); 83 Joshua Perkins TE (IR); 75 Josh Sweat DE (IR); 51 Paul Worrilow OLB (IR); Rookies in italics 53 active, 13 reserve, 10 practice squad

== Preseason ==
Week	Date	Opponent	Result	Record	Venue	Recap
1	August 9	Pittsburgh Steelers	L 14–31	0–1	Lincoln Financial Field	Recap
2	August 16	at New England Patriots	L 20–37	0–2	Gillette Stadium	Recap
3	August 23	at Cleveland Browns	L 0–5	0–3	FirstEnergy Stadium	Recap
4	August 30	New York Jets	W 10–9	1–3	Lincoln Financial Field	Recap

== Regular season ==
=== Schedule ===
On January 11, the NFL announced that the Eagles will play the Jacksonville Jaguars in one of the London Games at Wembley Stadium in London, England, with the Jaguars serving as the home team. It will be the Eagles' first appearance in the International Series. The game would occur during Week 8 (October 28), and will be televised in the United States. The exact date, along with network and kickoff time, were announced in conjunction with the release of the 2018 regular season schedule.

Week	Date	Opponent	Result	Record	Venue	Recap
1	September 6	Atlanta Falcons	**W** 18–12	1–0	Lincoln Financial Field	Recap
2	September 16	at Tampa Bay Buccaneers	**L** 21–27	1–1	Raymond James Stadium	Recap
3	September 23	Indianapolis Colts	**W** 20–16	2–1	Lincoln Financial Field	Recap
4	September 30	at Tennessee Titans	**L** 23–26 (OT)	2–2	Nissan Stadium	Recap
5	October 7	Minnesota Vikings	**L** 21–23	2–3	Lincoln Financial Field	Recap
6	October 11	at **New York Giants**	**W** 34–13	3–3	MetLife Stadium	Recap
7	October 21	Carolina Panthers	**L** 17–21	3–4	Lincoln Financial Field	Recap
8	October 28	at Jacksonville Jaguars	**W** 24–18	4–4	(United Kingdom) Wembley Stadium (London)	Recap
9	Bye					
10	November 11	**Dallas Cowboys**	**L** 20–27	4–5	Lincoln Financial Field	Recap
11	November 18	at New Orleans Saints	**L** 7–48	4–6	Mercedes-Benz Superdome	Recap
12	November 25	**New York Giants**	**W** 25–22	5–6	Lincoln Financial Field	Recap
13	December 3	**Washington Redskins**	**W** 28–13	6–6	Lincoln Financial Field	Recap
14	December 9	at **Dallas Cowboys**	**L** 23–29 (OT)	6–7	AT&T Stadium	Recap
15	December 16	at Los Angeles Rams	**W** 30–23	7–7	Los Angeles Memorial Coliseum	Recap
16	December 23	Houston Texans	**W** 32–30	8–7	Lincoln Financial Field	Recap
17	December 30	at **Washington Redskins**	**W** 24–0	9–7	FedExField	Recap

Note: Intra-division opponents are in bold text.

=== Game summaries ===
==== Week 1: vs. Atlanta Falcons ====
NFL Kickoff Game

Week One: Atlanta Falcons at Philadelphia Eagles – Game summary

Quarter	1	2	3	4	Total
Falcons	3	3	0	6	**12**
**Eagles**	0	3	7	8	**18**

at Lincoln Financial Field, Philadelphia, Pennsylvania

- Date: September 6
- Game time: 9:05 p.m. EDT
- Game weather: 81 °F (27 °C), Cloudy
- Game attendance: 69,696
- Referee: John Hussey
- TV announcers (NBC): Al Michaels, Cris Collinsworth, Michele Tafoya and Terry McAulay
- Recap, Gamebook

Game information

**First quarter**

- ATL – Matt Bryant 21-yard field goal, 5:01. Falcons 3–0. **Drive: 9 plays, 41 yards, 4:07.**

**Second quarter**

- PHI – Jake Elliott 26-yard field goal, 6:09. Tied 3–3. **Drive: 14 plays, 52 yards, 8:03.**
- ATL – Matt Bryant 52-yard field goal, 2:08. Falcons 6–3. **Drive: 8 plays, 41 yards, 4:01.**

**Third quarter**

- PHI – Jay Ajayi 1-yard run (Jake Elliott kick), 4:37. Eagles 10–6. **Drive: 11 plays, 63 yards, 5:34.**

**Fourth quarter**

- ATL – Tevin Coleman 9-yard run (kick failed, hit right upright), 9:48. Falcons 12–10. **Drive: 2 plays, 27 yards, 0:47.**
- PHI – Jay Ajayi 11-yard run (Jay Ajayi run), 2:19. Eagles 18–12. **Drive: 8 plays, 54 yards, 2:32.**

**Top passers**

- ATL – Matt Ryan – 21/43, 251 yards, INT
- PHI – Nick Foles – 19/34, 117 yards, INT

**Top rushers**

- ATL – Devonta Freeman – 6 rushes, 36 yards
- PHI – Jay Ajayi – 15 rushes, 62 yards, 2 TD

**Top receivers**

- ATL – Julio Jones – 10 receptions, 169 yards
- PHI – Zach Ertz – 5 receptions, 48 yards

The Eagles kicked off the 2018 season hosting Matt Ryan and the Atlanta Falcons in a rematch of last year's Divisional Round. The Falcons struggles in the red zone continued as they were stopped on fourth and goal on their first drive. The Eagles, however, had struggles of their own being held scoreless until midway through the second when Jake Elliott kicked a 26-yard field goal to tie the game. The Falcons responded with a Matt Bryant field goal to take a 6–3 lead at the half. The Eagles offense finally found life midway through the third in a remake of the Philly Special with the reigning Super Bowl MVP Nick Foles catching a pass from Nelson Agholor on a trick play. A 1-yard TD run by Jay Ajayi gave the Eagles their first lead of the night. A couple of drives later, the Eagles defense came up big again with a Rasul Douglas interception that ended a potential scoring drive for the Falcons. However, Foles (who struggled for most of the game) return the favor after throwing an interception to Deion Jones. Atlanta took advantage and scored on a 9-yard TD run by Tevin Coleman to give them a 12–10 lead (Bryant missed the extra point). The Eagles scored with under 3 minutes left on an 11-yard TD run by Ajayi and converted a two-point conversion to take a 6-point, 18–12 lead. Ryan and the Falcons had one more shot to win the game but in a repeat of last year's playoff matchup, the game came down to the final play with the Eagles stopping the Falcons on five consecutive plays, with the last being an incomplete pass from Matt Ryan to Julio Jones.

The Eagles won a nailbiter and open the season with a 1–0 record for the seventh time in their last nine openers dating back to 2010. Despite the defense's outstanding game, the offense struggled mightily. Foles finished 19/34 with 117 yards and 1 interception. Atlanta and Philadelphia combined for 26 penalties by the end of regulation.

==== Week 2: at Tampa Bay Buccaneers ====
Week Two: Philadelphia Eagles at Tampa Bay Buccaneers – Game summary

Quarter	1	2	3	4	Total
Eagles	0	7	7	7	**21**
**Buccaneers**	7	13	7	0	**27**

at Raymond James Stadium, Tampa, Florida

- Date: September 16
- Game time: 1:00 pm. EDT
- Game weather: 91 °F (33 °C), cloudy
- Game attendance: 56,552
- Referee: Alex Kemp
- TV announcers (Fox): Kenny Albert, Ronde Barber and Tiki Barber
- Recap, Gamebook

Game information

**First quarter**

- TB – DeSean Jackson 75-yard pass from Ryan Fitzpatrick (Chandler Catanzaro kick), 14:49. Buccaneers 7–0. **Drive: 1 play, 75 yards, 0:11.**

**Second quarter**

- PHI – Corey Clement 15-yard run (Jake Elliott kick), 4:51. Tied 7–7. **Drive: 13 plays, 78 yards, 6:09.**
- TB – O. J. Howard 75-yard pass from Ryan Fitzpatrick (kick failed, wide right), 4:39. Buccaneers 13–7. **Drive: 1 play, 75 yards, 0:12.**
- TB – Chris Godwin 8-yard pass from Ryan Fitzpatrick (Chandler Catanzaro kick), 0:42. Buccaneers 20–7. **Drive: 6 plays, 70 yards, 1:44.**

**Third quarter**

- TB – Mike Evans 4-yard pass from Ryan Fitzpatrick (Chandler Catanzaro kick), 9:19. Buccaneers 27–7. **Drive: 7 plays, 54 yards, 3:17.**
- PHI – Jay Ajayi 2-yard run (Jake Elliott kick), 0:09. Buccaneers 27–14. **Drive: 9 plays, 84 yards, 3:42.**

**Fourth quarter**

- PHI – Nelson Agholor 2-yard pass from Nick Foles (Jake Elliott kick), 2:46. Buccaneers 27–21. **Drive: 8 plays, 78 yards, 3:50.**

**Top passers**

- PHI – Nick Foles – 35/48, 334 yards, TD
- TB – Ryan Fitzpatrick – 27/33, 402 yards, 4 TD, INT

**Top rushers**

- PHI – Corey Clement – 6 rushes, 30 yards, TD
- TB – Peyton Barber – 16 rushes, 22 yards

**Top receivers**

- PHI – Zach Ertz – 11 receptions, 94 yards
- TB – Mike Evans – 10 receptions, 83 yards, TD

The Eagles traveled to Tampa Bay for Game 2 of the 2018 season. The Eagles defense struggled throughout most of the game as Ryan Fitzpatrick threw for 400+ yards and four TDs for the second consecutive week. The Eagles late comeback attempt fell short after the Bucs offense converted on a 3rd-and-3 aided by a penalty en route to a 27–21 loss. Cornerback Jalen Mills was heavily criticized after his poor performance which included allowing a 75-yard TD to DeSean Jackson on the first play of regulation.

The loss dropped the Eagles to 1–1.

==== Week 3: vs. Indianapolis Colts ====
Week Three: Indianapolis Colts at Philadelphia Eagles – Game summary

Quarter	1	2	3	4	Total
Colts	7	0	6	3	**16**
**Eagles**	7	3	3	7	**20**

at Lincoln Financial Field, Philadelphia, Pennsylvania

- Date: September 23
- Game time: 1:00 pm. EDT
- Game weather: 61 °F (16 °C), rain
- Game attendance: 69,696
- Referee: Clay Martin
- TV announcers (Fox): Chris Myers, Daryl Johnston and Laura Okmin
- Recap, Gamebook

Game information

**First quarter**

- PHI – Dallas Goedert 13-yard pass from Carson Wentz (Jake Elliott kick), 7:10. Eagles 7–0. **Drive: 12 plays, 79 yards, 5:11.**
- IND – Ryan Grant 5-yard pass from Andrew Luck (Adam Vinatieri kick), 0:24. Tied 7–7. **Drive: 6 plays, 55 yards, 1:52.**

**Second quarter**

- PHI – Jake Elliott 33-yard field goal, 3:05. Eagles 10–7. **Drive: 11 plays, 75 yards, 6:40.**

**Third quarter**

- IND – Adam Vinatieri 35-yard field goal, 9:41. Tied 10–10. **Drive: 9 plays, 48 yards, 3:35.**
- IND – Adam Vinatieri 31-yard field goal, 8:23. Colts 13–10. **Drive: 4 plays, 4 yards, 1:07.**
- PHI – Jake Elliott 24-yard field goal, 2:50. Tied 13–13. **Drive: 13 plays, 75 yards, 5:33.**

**Fourth quarter**

- IND – Adam Vinatieri 28-yard field goal, 14:20. Colts 16–13. **Drive: 4 plays, 3 yards, 1:00.**
- PHI – Wendell Smallwood 4-yard run (Jake Elliott kick), 3:02. Eagles 20–16. **Drive: 17 plays, 75 yards, 11:18.**

**Top passers**

- IND – Andrew Luck – 25/40, 164 yards, TD
- PHI – Carson Wentz – 25/37, 255 yards, TD, INT

**Top rushers**

- IND – Andrew Luck – 1 rush, 33 yards
- PHI – Corey Clement – 10 rushes, 56 yards

**Top receivers**

- IND – T. Y. Hilton – 5 receptions, 50 yards
- PHI – Dallas Goedert – 7 receptions, 73 yards, TD

Carson Wentz made his 2018 debut returning from a torn ACL he had suffered during Week 14 of the 2017 season in this game against the Colts. The Eagles offense struggled after the first drive, but the defense played well, holding Colts quarterback Andrew Luck to under 100 passing yards until late in the fourth quarter. Wentz led the offense to an 11-minute drive in the fourth quarter (aided by penalties) which resulted in running back Wendell Smallwood rushing for a touchdown to take the lead with 3 minutes left. The Colts got into the red zone but failed to score or at least get a first down. The final play came down to Jacoby Brissett attempting a Hail Mary that ended up barricaded in the end zone.

The win earned the Eagles a 2–1 record, tying with the Redskins for first in the NFC East.

==== Week 4: at Tennessee Titans ====
Week Four: Philadelphia Eagles at Tennessee Titans – Game summary

Quarter	1	2	3	4	OT	Total
Eagles	0	10	7	3	3	**23**
**Titans**	3	0	7	10	6	**26**

at Nissan Stadium, Nashville, Tennessee

- Date: September 30
- Game time: 1:00 pm. EDT/12:00 p.m. CDT
- Game weather: 80 °F (27 °C), sunny
- Game attendance: 69,013
- Referee: Shawn Hochuli
- TV announcers (Fox): Chris Myers, Daryl Johnston and Laura Okmin
- Recap, Gamebook

Game information

**First quarter**

- TEN – Ryan Succop 42-yard field goal, 11:22. Titans 3–0. **Drive: 8 plays, 51 yards, 3:38.**

**Second quarter**

- PHI – Jordan Matthews 56-yard pass from Carson Wentz (Jake Elliott kick), 4:04. Eagles 7–3. **Drive: 8 plays, 97 yards, 4:52.**
- PHI – Jake Elliott 27-yard field goal, 0:00. Eagles 10–3. **Drive: 4 plays, 8 yards, 0:26.**

**Third quarter**

- PHI – Alshon Jeffery 16-yard pass from Carson Wentz (Jake Elliott kick), 7:36. Eagles 17–3. **Drive: 12 plays, 75 yards, 7:24.**
- TEN – Marcus Mariota 2-yard run (Ryan Succop kick), 2:51. Eagles 17–10. **Drive: 8 plays, 75 yards, 4:45.**

**Fourth quarter**

- TEN – Ryan Succop 33-yard field goal, 9:18. Eagles 17–13. **Drive: 8 plays, 20 yards, 4:45.**
- TEN – Tajae Sharpe 11-yard pass from Marcus Mariota (Ryan Succop kick), 5:01. Titans 20–17. **Drive: 5 plays, 75 yards, 2:54.**
- PHI – Jake Elliott 30-yard field goal, 0:16. Tied 20–20. **Drive: 6 plays, 27 yards, 1:25.**

**Overtime**

- PHI – Jake Elliott 37-yard field goal, 6:19. Eagles 23–20. **Drive: 9 plays, 56 yards, 3:41.**
- TEN – Corey Davis 10-yard pass from Marcus Mariota, 0:05. Titans 26–23. **Drive: 16 plays, 75 yards, 6:14.**

**Top passers**

- PHI – Carson Wentz – 33/50, 348 yards, 2 TD
- TEN – Marcus Mariota – 30/43, 344 yards, 2 TD, INT

**Top rushers**

- PHI – Jay Ajayi – 15 rushes, 70 yards
- TEN – Marcus Mariota – 10 rushes, 46 yards, TD

**Top receivers**

- PHI – Zach Ertz – 10 receptions, 112 yards
- TEN – Corey Davis – 9 receptions, 161 yards, TD

The Eagles played sparingly well for the first three-quarters holding Tennessee to just a field goal. Wentz threw for two TDs including one to Alshon Jeffery who made his 2018 debut after an offseason surgery which kept him out for the first three weeks. However, the Eagles broke down completely in the fourth allowing Marcus Mariota and the Titans to comeback and take a 20–17 late in the fourth. A 42-yard punt return by DeAndre Carter set up a 30-yard field goal by Jake Elliott tied the game leading to overtime. Elliott kicked a 37-yarder to give the Eagles the lead in overtime. The defense was unable to stop the Titans offense, conceding multiple 4th down conversions on passes and through a crucial pass interference penalty. The drive ended with Mariota throwing a 10-yard TD to Corey Davis. The loss proved to be humiliating for the Eagles. Wentz in his second game back went 33/50 for 348 yards and two TDs. A defense decimated by injuries were once again criticized heavily for the loss.

The loss dropped the Eagles to 2–2, tied for second place with the Cowboys.

==== Week 5: vs. Minnesota Vikings ====
Week Five: Minnesota Vikings at Philadelphia Eagles – Game summary

Quarter	1	2	3	4	Total
**Vikings**	3	14	3	3	**23**
Eagles	0	3	3	15	**21**

at Lincoln Financial Field, Philadelphia, Pennsylvania

- Date: October 7
- Game time: 4:25 pm. EDT
- Game weather: 79 °F (26 °C), partly cloudy
- Game attendance: 69,696
- Referee: Walt Coleman
- TV announcers (Fox): Joe Buck, Troy Aikman and Erin Andrews
- Recap, Gamebook

Game information

**First quarter**

- MIN – Dan Bailey 37-yard field goal, 5:06. Vikings 3–0. **Drive: 5 plays, 31 yards, 2:02.**

**Second quarter**

- PHI – Jake Elliott 30-yard field goal, 12:27. Tied 3–3. **Drive: 5 plays, 55 yards, 2:11.**
- MIN – Linval Joseph 64-yard fumble return (Dan Bailey kick), 4:24. Vikings 10–3.
- MIN – Adam Thielen 3-yard pass from Kirk Cousins (Dan Bailey kick), 0:27. Vikings 17–3. **Drive: 8 plays, 56 yards, 2:24.**

**Third quarter**

- MIN – Dan Bailey 22-yard field goal, 7:35. Vikings 20–3. **Drive: 6 plays, 91 yards, 2:01.**
- PHI – Jake Elliott 28-yard field goal, 3:00. Vikings 20–6. **Drive: 8 plays, 67 yards, 4:35.**

**Fourth quarter**

- PHI – Wendell Smallwood 12-yard pass from Carson Wentz (Wendell Smallwood run), 12:09. Vikings 20–14. **Drive: 10 plays, 66 yards, 4:14.**
- MIN – Dan Bailey 52-yard field goal, 2:51. Vikings 23–14. **Drive: 11 plays, 55 yards, 6:24.**
- PHI – Zach Ertz 7-yard pass from Carson Wentz (Jake Elliott kick), 1:15. Vikings 23–21. **Drive: 7 plays, 75 yards, 1:38.**

**Top passers**

- MIN – Kirk Cousins – 30/37, 301 yards, TD
- PHI – Carson Wentz – 24/35, 311 yards, 2 TD

**Top rushers**

- MIN – Latavius Murray – 11 rushes, 42 yards
- PHI – Jay Ajayi – 8 rushes, 29 yards

**Top receivers**

- MIN – Adam Thielen – 7 receptions, 116 yards, TD
- PHI – Zach Ertz – 10 receptions, 110 yards, TD

In a rematch of last year's Conference Championship game, the Eagles dropped their second straight game of the season to Minnesota 23–21. A slow start aided with poor defensive play cost the Eagles as their rally attempt fell short.

With this loss, the Eagles matched their loss total from 2017. There were multiple plays that proved critical to the outcome, including a controversial roughing-the-passer call on Michael Bennett at the end of the first half that continued a touchdown-scoring drive, and a third-quarter Jay Ajayi fumble near the goal line. They were also flagged 3 times for illegal formation penalties, and Carson Wentz was flagged for intentional grounding that cost the Eagles an opportunity to kick a field goal with 9:33 left in the 4th quarter.

The loss dropped the Eagles to 2–3, still tied for second place since Dallas lost later to the Texans in overtime.

==== Week 6: at New York Giants ====
Week Six: Philadelphia Eagles at New York Giants – Game summary

Quarter	1	2	3	4	Total
**Eagles**	14	10	7	3	**34**
Giants	3	3	7	0	**13**

at MetLife Stadium, East Rutherford, New Jersey

- Date: October 11
- Game time: 8:20 pm. EDT
- Game weather: 70 °F (21 °C), light rain
- Game attendance: 77,167
- Referee: Ronald Torbert
- TV announcers (Fox/NFLN): Joe Buck, Troy Aikman, Erin Andrews and Kristina Pink
- Recap, Gamebook

Game information

**First quarter**

- PHI – Alshon Jeffery 13-yard pass from Carson Wentz (Jake Elliott kick), 13:15. Eagles 7–0. **Drive: 3 plays, 16 yards, 1:00.**
- NYG – Aldrick Rosas 33-yard field goal, 10:09. Eagles 7–3. **Drive: 7 plays, 60 yards, 3:09.**
- PHI – Corey Clement 1-yard run (Jake Elliott kick), 1:28. Eagles 14–3. **Drive: 6 plays, 44 yards, 3:21.**

**Second quarter**

- NYG – Aldrick Rosas 21-yard field goal, 5:48. Eagles 14–6. **Drive: 9 plays, 65 yards, 2:30.**
- PHI – Zach Ertz 10-yard pass from Carson Wentz (Jake Elliott kick), 4:22. Eagles 21–6. **Drive: 4 plays, 75 yards, 1:22.**
- PHI – Jake Elliott 33-yard field goal, 1:34. Eagles 24–6. **Drive: 6 plays, 35 yards, 1:33.**

**Third quarter**

- PHI – Alshon Jeffery 1-yard pass from Carson Wentz (Jake Elliott kick), 8:42. Eagles 31–6. **Drive: 12 plays, 75 yards, 6:18.**
- NYG – Saquon Barkley 50-yard run (Aldrick Rosas kick), 6:10. Eagles 31–13. **Drive: 5 plays, 75 yards, 2:32.**

**Fourth quarter**

- PHI – Jake Elliott 30-yard field goal, 14:56. Eagles 34–13. **Drive: 13 plays, 64 yards, 6:18.**

**Top passers**

- PHI – Carson Wentz – 26/36, 278 yards, 3 TD
- NYG – Eli Manning – 24/43, 281 yards, INT

**Top rushers**

- PHI – Wendell Smallwood – 18 rushes, 51 yards
- NYG – Saquon Barkley – 13 rushes, 130 yards, TD

**Top receivers**

- PHI – Alshon Jeffery – 8 receptions, 74 yards, 2 TD
- NYG – Saquon Barkley – 9 receptions, 99 yards

What was considered a must win game, the Eagles looked dominant and never looked back. The game started off with linebacker Kamu Grugier-Hill intercepting Eli Manning setting up a Wentz TD pass to Alshon Jeffery. The Giants responded with a field goal making it 7–3. Later in the first, a Corey Clement 1-yard TD run put the Eagles up 14–3 The Eagles shut down the Giants for the most part in the first half leading 24–6 by half time. All the Giants mustered was a 50-yard TD run by rookie Saquon Barkley. The Eagles mostly burned out time in the fourth adding more points with an Elliott 30-yard field goal to make it 34–13. The Eagles offense resembled their Super Bowl winning offense while the defense stepped up and shut down Eli Manning and Odell Beckham Jr. However, Barkley had 130 rushing yards and a TD.

With this win, the Eagles had increased their record to 3–3 and have now won four straight games over the Giants dating back to December 2016. However the Eagles remained tied second place in the division since the Cowboys and Redskins won their games.

==== Week 7: vs. Carolina Panthers ====
Week Seven: Carolina Panthers at Philadelphia Eagles – Game summary

Quarter	1	2	3	4	Total
**Panthers**	0	0	0	21	**21**
Eagles	0	10	7	0	**17**

at Lincoln Financial Field, Philadelphia, Pennsylvania

- Date: October 21
- Game time: 1:00 pm. EDT
- Game weather: 49 °F (9 °C), partly sunny
- Game attendance: 69,696
- Referee: Clete Blakeman
- TV announcers (Fox): Kenny Albert, Charles Davis and Pam Oliver
- Recap, Gamebook

Game information

First quarter

- No Scoring plays.

Second quarter

- PHI – Alshon Jeffery 11-yard pass from Carson Wentz (Jake Elliott kick), 11:39. Eagles 7–0. **Drive: 7 plays, 74 yards, 3:44.**
- PHI – Jake Elliott 46-yard field goal, 6:36. Eagles 10–0. **Drive: 6 plays, 60 yards, 3:21.**

Third quarter

- PHI – Dallas Goedert 1-yard pass from Carson Wentz (Jake Elliott kick), 0:39. Eagles 17–0. **Drive: 17 plays, 49 yards, 9:22.**

Fourth quarter

- CAR – Curtis Samuel 14-yard run (kick failed, wide right), 10:41. Eagles 17–6. **Drive: 11 plays, 80 yards, 4:58.**
- CAR – Devin Funchess 18-yard pass from Cam Newton (Cam Newton–Jarius Wright pass), 4:08. Eagles 17–14. **Drive: 7 plays, 78 yards, 2:44.**
- CAR – Greg Olsen 1-yard pass from Cam Newton (Graham Gano kick), 1:22. Panthers 21–17. **Drive: 10 plays, 69 yards, 0:55.**

**Top passers**

- CAR – Cam Newton – 25/39, 269 yards, 2 TD
- PHI – Carson Wentz – 30/37, 310 yards, 2 TD

**Top rushers**

- CAR – Cam Newton – 7 rushes, 49 yards
- PHI – Wendell Smallwood – 9 rushes, 32 yards

**Top receivers**

- CAR – Devin Funchess – 6 receptions, 62 yards, TD
- PHI – Zach Ertz – 9 receptions, 138 yards

After a big road win, the Eagles came back home to square off against Cam Newton and the Panthers. The Eagles again looked poised to win; going up 10–0 before halftime, then going up 17–0 before the end of the 3rd Quarter. But in a much similar narrative to their Week 4 loss in Tennessee, the Eagles broke down in the fourth quarter allowing the Panthers to score 21 unanswered points; including a 2-point conversion from Cam Newton to Jarius Wright following the second of their 3 touchdowns. The offense was shut down and did not respond to Cam Newton's three TDs to Curtis Samuel, Devin Funchess and Greg Olsen. The Eagles had one more shot to win after a defensive pass interference penalty moved them deep in Panthers territory, but they didn't convert on a key fourth down, sealing yet another loss with a blown lead.

The loss dropped the Eagles to 3–4 and third in the NFC East, and allowed the Redskins to take a two-game lead in the division after they beat the Cowboys later that evening. Also with this loss, they could no longer match their win total from their Super Bowl-winning season. This marked the Eagles last loss to Carolina until 2026.

==== Week 8: at Jacksonville Jaguars ====
NFL London Games

Week Eight: Philadelphia Eagles at Jacksonville Jaguars – Game summary

Quarter	1	2	3	4	Total
**Eagles**	0	10	7	7	**24**
Jaguars	3	3	6	6	**18**

at Wembley Stadium, London, England

- Date: October 28
- Game time: 1:30 p.m. GMT/9:30 am. EDT
- Game weather: 48 °F (9 °C), partly cloudy
- Game attendance: 85,870
- Referee: John Hussey
- TV announcers (NFLN/WPVI): Rich Eisen, Steve Mariucci, Kurt Warner, Michael Irvin, Melissa Stark and Peter Schrager
- Recap, Gamebook

Game information

**First quarter**

- JAX – Josh Lambo 50-yard field goal, 6:56. Jaguars 3–0. **Drive: 9 plays, 39 yards, 5:05.**

**Second quarter**

- PHI – Jake Elliott 31-yard field goal, 7:46. Tied 3–3. **Drive: 13 plays, 64 yards, 7:05.**
- JAX – Josh Lambo 57-yard field goal, 2:48. Jaguars 6–3. **Drive: 8 plays, 36 yards, 5:00.**
- PHI – Dallas Goedert 32-yard pass from Carson Wentz (Jake Elliott kick), 0:38. Eagles 10–6. **Drive: 4 plays, 44 yards, 1:00.**

**Third quarter**

- PHI – Wendell Smallwood 36-yard pass from Carson Wentz (Jake Elliott kick), 8:48. Eagles 17–6. **Drive: 9 plays, 95 yards, 5:00.**
- JAX – Dede Westbrook 11-yard pass from Blake Bortles (pass failed), 4:38. Eagles 17–12. **Drive: 9 plays, 75 yards, 4:06.**

**Fourth quarter**

- JAX – Josh Lambo 33-yard field goal, 13:14. Eagles 17–15. **Drive: 11 plays, 37 yards, 4:57.**
- PHI – Zach Ertz 5-yard pass from Carson Wentz (Jake Elliott kick), 10:00. Eagles 24–15. **Drive: 6 plays, 75 yards, 3:15.**
- JAX – Josh Lambo 24-yard field goal, 7:00. Eagles 24–18. **Drive: 10 plays, 69 yards, 2:58.**

**Top passers**

- PHI – Carson Wentz – 21/30, 286 yards, 3 TD, INT
- JAX – Blake Bortles – 24/41, 286 yards, TD

**Top rushers**

- PHI – Josh Adams – 9 rushes, 61 yards
- JAX – Blake Bortles – 8 rushes, 43 yards

**Top receivers**

- PHI – Jordan Matthews – 4 receptions, 93 yards
- JAX – T. J. Yeldon – 7 receptions, 83 yards

This marked the Eagles first appearance in the NFL International Series in London as they faced the Jacksonville Jaguars who were also struggling after a strong 2017 campaign. After two turnovers on their first two processions, the Eagles offense played well. Wentz had another strong game after facing criticism after last week, throwing for three TDs. Rookie tight end Dallas Goedert scored a TD for the second straight week and his third in his career. The defense managed to stop the Jaguars on their last drive to prevent a game winning drive. The Eagles sealed the win on their last drive, making two key conversions on second down, which helped them milk out the clock.

With the close win, the Eagles headed into their bye week with a 4–4 record.

==== Week 9: Bye week ====
During their bye week, the Eagles traded a 2019 third-round pick to the Detroit Lions for WR Golden Tate at the trade deadline. The Eagles also gained better position in the NFC East with the Redskins and Cowboys both losing their games.

==== Week 10: vs. Dallas Cowboys ====
Week Ten: Dallas Cowboys at Philadelphia Eagles – Game summary

Quarter	1	2	3	4	Total
**Cowboys**	3	10	0	14	**27**
Eagles	0	3	10	7	**20**

at Lincoln Financial Field, Philadelphia, Pennsylvania

- Date: November 11
- Game time: 8:20 pm. EST
- Game weather: 38 °F (3 °C), clear
- Game attendance: 69,696
- Referee: John Parry
- TV announcers (NBC): Al Michaels, Cris Collinsworth, Michele Tafoya and Terry McAulay
- Recap, Gamebook

Game information

**First quarter**

- DAL – Brett Maher 25-yard field goal, 6:59. Cowboys 3–0. **Drive: 9 plays, 31 yards, 3:46.**

**Second quarter**

- DAL – Brett Maher 31-yard field goal, 3:41. Cowboys 6–0. **Drive: 14 plays, 64 yards, 8:09.**
- PHI – Jake Elliott 56-yard field goal, 1:33. Cowboys 6–3. **Drive: 8 plays, 35 yards, 2:08.**
- DAL – Dak Prescott 1-yard run (Brett Maher kick), 0:19. Cowboys 13–3. **Drive: 8 plays, 75 yards, 1:14.**

**Third quarter**

- PHI – Jake Elliott 26-yard field goal, 9:36. Cowboys 13–6. **Drive: 8 plays, 47 yards, 3:21.**
- PHI – Zach Ertz 15-yard pass from Carson Wentz (Jake Elliott kick), 2:08. Tied 13–13. **Drive: 10 plays, 68 yards, 5:31.**

**Fourth quarter**

- DAL – Ezekiel Elliott 7-yard pass from Dak Prescott (Brett Maher kick), 11:42. Cowboys 20–13. **Drive: 9 plays, 75 yards, 5:26.**
- PHI – Zach Ertz 1-yard pass from Carson Wentz (Jake Elliott kick), 7:27. Tied 20–20. **Drive: 7 plays, 74 yards, 4:15.**
- DAL – Ezekiel Elliott 1-yard run (Brett Maher kick), 3:19. Cowboys 27–20. **Drive: 8 plays, 75 yards, 4:08.**

**Top passers**

- DAL – Dak Prescott – 26/36, 270 yards, TD
- PHI – Carson Wentz – 32/44, 360 yards, 2 TD, INT

**Top rushers**

- DAL – Ezekiel Elliott – 19 rushes, 151 yards, TD
- PHI – Josh Adams – 7 rushes, 47 yards

**Top receivers**

- DAL – Amari Cooper – 6 receptions, 75 yards
- PHI – Zach Ertz – 14 receptions, 145 yards, 2 TD

The Eagles returned home for a crucial Sunday Night game against their bitter rivals the Dallas Cowboys who had struggled with a dismal 3–5 record. Despite being favored to dominate, they struggled in the first half trailing 13–3 at the half, and despite keeping neck and neck, never once led. After finding a spark on offense, the defense struggled to contain the Cowboys. A last second desperation drive with Zach Ertz lateraling the ball to Golden Tate ended up falling short of the end zone. With this loss, they not only dropped them to 4–5, but it also raised many concerns on whether or not if the team were still contenders. Also with the loss, they dropped to third place in the NFC East division, standing at the brink of playoff contention just 9 months after winning the Super Bowl.

==== Week 11: at New Orleans Saints ====
Week Eleven: Philadelphia Eagles at New Orleans Saints – Game summary

Quarter	1	2	3	4	Total
Eagles	0	7	0	0	**7**
**Saints**	10	14	14	10	**48**

at Mercedes-Benz Superdome, New Orleans, Louisiana

- Date: November 18
- Game time: 4:25 pm. EST/3:25 pm. CST
- Game weather: Played indoors (dome stadium)
- Game attendance: 73,042
- Referee: Carl Cheffers
- TV announcers (Fox): Joe Buck, Troy Aikman and Erin Andrews
- Recap, Gamebook

Game information

**First quarter**

- NO – Wil Lutz 38-yard field goal, 9:10. Saints 3–0. **Drive: 8 plays, 57 yards, 4:14.**
- NO – Austin Carr 3-yard pass from Drew Brees (Wil Lutz kick), 3:12. Saints 10–0. **Drive: 11 plays, 86 yards, 4:52.**

**Second quarter**

- NO – Mark Ingram II 14-yard rush (Wil Lutz kick), 12:07. Saints 17–0. **Drive: 10 plays, 84 yards, 5:32.**
- PHI – Josh Adams 28-yard rush (Jake Elliott kick), 8:42. Saints 17–7. **Drive: 6 plays, 75 yards, 3:25.**
- NO – Tre'Quan Smith 15-yard pass from Drew Brees (Wil Lutz kick), 0:39. Saints 24–7. **Drive: 7 plays, 84 yards, 2:40.**

**Third quarter**

- NO – Michael Thomas 23-yard pass from Drew Brees (Wil Lutz kick), 11:20. Saints 31–7. **Drive: 6 plays, 70 yards, 3:40.**
- NO – Mark Ingram II 1-yard rush (Wil Lutz kick), 5:34. Saints 38–7. **Drive: 7 plays, 41 yards, 4:22.**

**Fourth quarter**

- NO – Alvin Kamara 37-yard pass from Drew Brees (Wil Lutz kick), 13:15. Saints 45–7. **Drive: 7 plays, 87 yards, 3:18.**
- NO – Wil Lutz 19-yard field goal, 6:46. Saints 48–7. **Drive: 8 plays, 33 yards, 5:02.**

**Top passers**

- PHI – Carson Wentz – 19/33, 156 yards, 3 INT
- NO – Drew Brees – 22/30, 363 yards, 4 TD

**Top rushers**

- PHI – Josh Adams – 7 rushes, 53 yards, TD
- NO – Mark Ingram II – 16 rushes, 103 yards, 2 TD

**Top receivers**

- PHI – Golden Tate – 5 receptions, 48 yards
- NO – Tre'Quan Smith – 10 receptions, 157 yards, TD

The Eagles entered this game with a gruesome injury list and shorthanded on defense. The Eagles struggled to get anything going on offense while the defense (which consisted of third string/practice squad players) was unable to contain Drew Brees and the Saints. The Eagles suffered a major meltdown all evening long as fans started to boil over on social media and question their defending champs inconsistent performance. Even the voice of the Eagles; Merrill Reese commented on Twitter, "What a disaster! I didn't expect the Eagles to win but I didn't expect them to be completely dominated in every respect from beginning to end. Where are they going to get corners to play against the Giants next week ?". The Saints were too much for the Eagles as the team fell to 4–6 on the season and at the brink of the playoff picture. Carson Wentz had the worst game of his career; being held to 156 yards, no touchdowns and 3 interceptions.

Furthermore, the Eagles' loss to the Saints by 41 points is the biggest defeat for a defending Super Bowl Champion. In addition, this was their worst loss since their 42–0 defeat to the Seahawks in 2005.

This was also the Eagles' first defeat to New Orleans since the 2012 season.

==== Week 12: vs. New York Giants ====
Week Twelve: New York Giants at Philadelphia Eagles – Game summary

Quarter	1	2	3	4	Total
Giants	9	10	0	3	**22**
**Eagles**	0	11	3	11	**25**

at Lincoln Financial Field, Philadelphia, Pennsylvania

- Date: November 25
- Game time: 1:00 pm. EST
- Game weather: 56 °F (13 °C), mostly sunny
- Game attendance: 69,696
- Referee: Walt Anderson
- TV announcers (Fox): Thom Brennaman, Chris Spielman and Shannon Spake
- Recap, Gamebook

Game information

**First quarter**

- NYG – Saquon Barkley 13-yard pass from Eli Manning (pass failed), 10:38. Giants 6–0. **Drive: 9 plays, 75 yards, 4:22.**
- NYG – Aldrick Rosas 25-yard field goal, 3:13. Giants 9–0. **Drive: 10 plays, 87 yards, 5:04.**

**Second quarter**

- NYG – Aldrick Rosas 51-yard field goal, 9:34. Giants 12–0. **Drive: 10 plays, 54 yards, 5:26.**
- PHI – Jake Elliott 42-yard field goal, 5:19. Giants 12–3. **Drive: 7 plays, 46 yards, 4:15.**
- NYG – Saquon Barkley 51-yard rush (Aldrick Rosas kick), 4:06. Giants 19–3. **Drive: 3 plays, 75 yards, 1:13.**
- PHI – Zach Ertz 15-yard pass from Carson Wentz (Corey Clement run), 1:04. Giants 19–11. **Drive: 6 plays, 75 yards, 3:02.**

**Third quarter**

- PHI – Jake Elliott 28-yard field goal, 6:49. Giants 19–14. **Drive: 8 plays, 37 yards, 3:18.**

**Fourth quarter**

- PHI – Josh Adams 1-yard rush (Josh Adams run kick), 10:11. Eagles 22–19. **Drive: 7 plays, 61 yards, 3:54.**
- NYG – Aldrick Rosas 29-yard field goal, 5:49. Tied 22–22. **Drive: 8 plays, 56 yards, 4:22.**
- PHI – Jake Elliott 43-yard field goal, 0:22. Eagles 25–22. **Drive: 10 plays, 50 yards, 5:27.**

**Top passers**

- NYG – Eli Manning – 26/37, 297 yards, TD, INT
- PHI – Carson Wentz – 20/28, 236 yards, TD

**Top rushers**

- NYG – Saquon Barkley – 13 rushes, 101 yards, TD
- PHI – Josh Adams – 22 rushes, 84 yards, TD

**Top receivers**

- NYG – Odell Beckham Jr. – 5 receptions, 85 yards
- PHI – Zach Ertz – 7 receptions, 91 yards, TD

After last week's meltdown, the Eagles returned home for round 2 against the Giants who were having an underwhelming season. The Eagles struggles continued as they fell through early facing a 19–3 deficit. However, the offense turned around and scored 22 unanswered points led by young running backs Corey Clement and rookie Josh Adams while the defense shutdown Eli Manning and held them to just 3 points in the second half. The Eagles would win with a Jake Elliott game-winning field goal completing their comeback and snapping their 3-game losing streak.

The Eagles advanced to 5–6 after what it seemed like all hope was lost.

With this win, the all-time series is tied 86–86–2. Furthermore, the Eagles have now won five straight games over the Giants dating back to December 2016 and extended their home win streak against the Giants to five games (dating back to October 2014).

==== Week 13: vs. Washington Redskins ====
Week Thirteen: Washington Redskins at Philadelphia Eagles – Game summary

Quarter	1	2	3	4	Total
Redskins	0	13	0	0	**13**
**Eagles**	7	7	0	14	**28**

at Lincoln Financial Field, Philadelphia, Pennsylvania

- Date: December 3
- Game time: 8:15 pm. EST
- Game weather: 36 °F (2 °C), cloudy
- Game attendance: 69,696
- Referee: Tony Corrente
- TV announcers (ESPN): Joe Tessitore, Jason Witten, Booger McFarland and Lisa Salters
- Recap, Gamebook

Game information

**First quarter**

- PHI – Golden Tate 6-yard pass from Carson Wentz (Jake Elliott kick), 7:31. Eagles 7–0. **Drive: 12 plays, 80 yards, 7:29.**

**Second quarter**

- WAS – Dustin Hopkins 44-yard field goal, 13:46. Eagles 7–3. **Drive: 8 plays, 42 yards, 4:58.**
- WAS – Adrian Peterson 90-yard rush (Dustin Hopkins kick), 9:23. Redskins 10–7. **Drive: 1 play, 90 yards, 0:13.**
- PHI – Darren Sproles 14-yard rush (Jake Elliott kick), 1:46. Eagles 14–10. **Drive: 3 plays, 26 yards, 0:35.**
- WAS – Dustin Hopkins 47-yard field goal, 0:15. Eagles 14–13. **Drive: 9 plays, 46 yards, 1:31.**

**Third quarter**

- No scoring plays.

**Fourth quarter**

- PHI – Jordan Matthews 4-yard pass from Carson Wentz (Carson Wentz–Golden Tate pass), 14:10. Eagles 22–13. **Drive: 11 plays, 85 yards, 5:41.**
- PHI – Jake Elliott 46-yard field goal, 11:41. Eagles 25–13. **Drive: 4 plays, 7 yards, 0:56.**
- PHI – Jake Elliott 44-yard field goal, 4:48. Eagles 28–13. **Drive: 10 plays, 42 yards, 5:14.**

**Top passers**

- WAS – Mark Sanchez – 13/21, 100 yards, INT
- PHI – Carson Wentz – 27/39, 306 yards, 2 TD, INT

**Top rushers**

- WAS – Adrian Peterson – 9 rushes, 98 yards, TD
- PHI – Josh Adams – 20 rushes, 85 yards

**Top receivers**

- WAS – Josh Doctson – 3 receptions, 51 yards
- PHI – Golden Tate – 7 receptions, 85 yards, TD

After a big comeback last week, the Eagles stayed home for a Monday Night showdown against Adrian Peterson and the Redskins. The Eagles mostly dominated throughout the game although there were some self-inflicted wounds that could've costed them. The offense was solid for the most part although there were some questionable plays. The defense mostly contained the Redskins, despite allowing a 90-yard Adrian Peterson TD run. The defense knocked out veteran backup Colt McCoy (who was filling in for Alex Smith who was out for the year). Former Eagles QB Mark Sanchez came in for the Redskins. A Nathan Gerry INT setup the Eagles to essentially pull the game away with a 4-yard TD pass to Jordan Matthews.

With this win against the Redskins, the Eagles now evened their record at 6–6. They have now won three straight games over the Redskins dating back to 2017. Also with this win they won back to back games for the first time this season.

==== Week 14: at Dallas Cowboys ====
Week Fourteen: Philadelphia Eagles at Dallas Cowboys – Game summary

Quarter	1	2	3	4	OT	Total
Eagles	0	0	6	17	0	**23**
**Cowboys**	3	3	3	14	6	**29**

at AT&T Stadium, Arlington, Texas

- Date: December 9
- Game time: 4:25 pm. EST/3:25 pm. CST
- Game weather: Played indoors (retractable roof closed)
- Game attendance: 93,127
- Referee: Clete Blakeman
- TV announcers (Fox): Joe Buck, Troy Aikman and Erin Andrews
- Recap, Gamebook

Game information

**First quarter**

- DAL – Brett Maher 28-yard field goal, 2:25. Cowboys 3–0. **Drive: 13 plays, 80 yards, 6:58.**

**Second quarter**

- DAL – Brett Maher 62-yard field goal, 0:00. Cowboys 6–0. **Drive: 7 plays, 18 yards, 0:52.**

**Third quarter**

- DAL – Brett Maher 21-yard field goal, 8:59. Cowboys 9–0. **Drive: 9 plays, 51 yards, 4:26.**
- PHI – Alshon Jeffery 2-yard pass from Carson Wentz (kick failed, wide right), 6:04. Cowboys 9–6. **Drive: 1 play, 2 yards, 0:04.**

**Fourth quarter**

- PHI – Jake Elliott 26-yard field goal, 12:11. Tied 9–9. **Drive: 10 plays, 47 yards, 4:53.**
- DAL – Amari Cooper 28-yard pass from Dak Prescott (Brett Maher kick), 7:46. Cowboys 16–9. **Drive: 9 plays, 75 yards, 4:25.**
- PHI – Dallas Goedert 3-yard pass from Carson Wentz (Jake Elliott kick), 3:12. Tied 16–16. **Drive: 4 plays, 47 yards, 2:13.**
- DAL – Amari Cooper 75-yard pass from Dak Prescott (Brett Maher kick), 3:01. Cowboys 23–16. **Drive: 1 play, 75 yards, 0:11.**
- PHI – Darren Sproles 6-yard pass from Carson Wentz (Jake Elliott kick), 1:39. Tied 23–23. **Drive: 6 plays, 75 yards, 1:22.**

**Overtime**

- DAL – Amari Cooper 15-yard pass from Dak Prescott, 1:55. Cowboys 29–23. **Drive: 13 plays, 75 yards, 8:05.**

**Top passers**

- PHI – Carson Wentz – 22/32, 228 yards, 3 TD
- DAL – Dak Prescott – 42/54, 455 yards, 3 TD, 2 INT

**Top rushers**

- PHI – Josh Adams – 7 rushes, 36 yards
- DAL – Ezekiel Elliott – 28 rushes, 113 yards

**Top receivers**

- PHI – Alshon Jeffery – 6 receptions, 50 yards, TD
- DAL – Amari Cooper – 10 receptions, 217 yards, 3 TD

The Eagles came in feeling good about themselves as they looked to take the division. However, with a slow start, the Eagles seemed to lose life again. However, they came back and it was a back and forth battle between the two teams. While the Eagles offense got it going, the defense was unable to contain Dak Prescott and the Cowboys; who torched the Eagles with 455 yards, 192 yards from scrimmage by Ezekiel Elliott and 3 touchdowns to Amari Cooper. Eventually, the Cowboys won with an Amari Cooper TD in overtime. The loss proved to be crumbling for the Eagles as they fell back at the brink of the playoff picture. After the game, controversy filled among fans on social media blaming the officiating by the referees which affected the outcome.

With the loss, the Eagles fell to 6–7, and they were swept by the Cowboys for the first time since 2012.

==== Week 15: at Los Angeles Rams ====
Week Fifteen: Philadelphia Eagles at Los Angeles Rams – Game summary

Quarter	1	2	3	4	Total
**Eagles**	3	10	17	0	**30**
Rams	7	6	0	10	**23**

at Los Angeles Memorial Coliseum, Los Angeles, California

- Date: December 16
- Game time: 8:20 pm. EST/5:20 p.m. PST
- Game weather: 60 °F (16 °C), cloudy
- Game attendance: 74,210
- Referee: Bill Vinovich
- TV announcers (NBC): Al Michaels, Cris Collinsworth, Michele Tafoya and Terry McAulay
- Recap, Gamebook

Game information

**First quarter**

- PHI – Jake Elliott 51-yard field goal, 8:35. Eagles 3–0. **Drive: 9 plays, 43 yards, 4:49.**
- LAR – Todd Gurley 5-yard rush (Greg Zuerlein kick), 1:16. Rams 7–3. **Drive: 13 plays, 80 yards, 7:19.**

**Second quarter**

- PHI – Jake Elliott 34-yard field goal, 12:00. Rams 7–6. **Drive: 10 plays, 59 yards, 4:16.**
- LAR – Greg Zuerlein 41-yard field goal, 4:38. Rams 10–6. **Drive: 8 plays, 28 yards, 4:51.**
- PHI – Josh Adams 6-yard rush (Jake Elliott kick), 1:07. Eagles 13–10. **Drive: 9 plays, 75 yards, 3:31.**
- LAR – Greg Zuerlein 36-yard field goal, 0:00. Tied 13–13. **Drive: 10 plays, 57 yards, 1:07.**

**Third quarter**

- PHI – Wendell Smallwood 9-yard rush (Jake Elliott kick), 10:28. Eagles 20–13. **Drive: 2 plays, 59 yards, 0:46.**
- PHI – Jake Elliott 40-yard field goal, 3:11. Eagles 23–13. **Drive: 10 plays, 52 yards, 5:56.**
- PHI – Wendell Smallwood 4-yard rush (Jake Elliott kick), 1:34. Eagles 30–13. **Drive: 2 plays, 12 yards, 0:38.**

**Fourth quarter**

- LAR – Greg Zuerlein 37-yard field goal, 9:24. Eagles 30–16. **Drive: 10 plays, 46 yards, 4:45.**
- LAR – Todd Gurley 1-yard rush (Greg Zuerlein kick), 4:06. Eagles 30–23. **Drive: 11 plays, 84 yards, 2:12.**

**Top passers**

- PHI – Nick Foles – 24/31, 270 yards, INT
- LAR – Jared Goff – 35/54, 339 yards, 2 INT

**Top rushers**

- PHI – Wendell Smallwood – 10 rushes, 48 yards, 2 TD
- LAR – Todd Gurley – 12 rushes, 48 yards, 2 TD

**Top receivers**

- PHI – Alshon Jeffery – 8 receptions, 160 yards
- LAR – Todd Gurley – 10 receptions, 76 yards

After a heartbreaking loss, the Eagles came into LA wounded with injuries, including QB Carson Wentz, who was ruled out for the game. It was Nick Foles who was going to start against Jared Goff and the red hot Rams. The Eagles shocked the Rams with a 30–13 lead by the end of the third quarter. However, the Rams rallied back within one score with one last shot to send the game into overtime. The Eagles defense stalled them on their last drive and sealed the upset. The defense was praised for containing one of the NFL's top offenses while the offense was praised for its strong performance led by Foles.

With the win in Los Angeles, the Eagles climbed back to 7–7, and kept their playoff hopes alive. They entered the game as 13.5-point underdogs. Nick Foles once again came into LA and beat the Rams after taking over for an injured Carson Wentz, as he had done in 2017.

==== Week 16: vs. Houston Texans ====
Week Sixteen: Houston Texans at Philadelphia Eagles – Game summary

Quarter	1	2	3	4	Total
Texans	0	16	0	14	**30**
**Eagles**	7	6	10	9	**32**

at Lincoln Financial Field, Philadelphia, Pennsylvania

- Date: December 23
- Game time: 1:00 pm. EST
- Game weather: 44 °F (7 °C), clear
- Game attendance: 69,696
- Referee: John Parry
- TV announcers (CBS): Ian Eagle, Dan Fouts and Evan Washburn
- Recap, Gamebook

Game information

**First quarter**

- PHI – Darren Sproles 37-yard pass from Nick Foles (Jake Elliott kick), 6:42. Eagles 7–0. **Drive: 13 plays, 77 yards, 7:04.**

**Second quarter**

- HOU – Kaʻimi Fairbairn 30-yard field goal, 14:55. Eagles 7–3. **Drive: 12 plays, 63 yards, 6:40.**
- HOU – Deshaun Watson 5-yard run (kick failed, wide right), 10:23. Texans 9–7. **Drive: 1 play, 5 yards, 0:04.**
- PHI – Zach Ertz 1-yard pass from Nick Foles (pass failed), 3:11. Eagles 13–9. **Drive: 14 plays, 75 yards, 7:15.**
- HOU – Deshaun Watson 6-yard run (Kaʻimi Fairbairn kick), 1:17. Texans 16–13. **Drive: 8 plays, 80 yards, 1:51.**

**Third quarter**

- PHI – Jake Elliott 47-yard field goal, 5:35. Tied 16–16. **Drive: 7 plays, 59 yards, 3:55.**
- PHI – Nelson Agholor 83-yard pass from Nick Foles (Jake Elliott kick), 2:31. Eagles 23–16. **Drive: 1 play, 83 yards, 0:14.**

**Fourth quarter**

- PHI – Zach Ertz 23-yard pass from Nick Foles (kick failed, wide right), 10:30. Eagles 29–16. **Drive: 5 plays, 44 yards, 3:22.**
- HOU – D'Onta Foreman 20-yard pass from Deshaun Watson (Kaʻimi Fairbairn kick), 4:41. Eagles 29–23. **Drive: 5 plays, 55 yards, 0:39.**
- HOU – Vyncint Smith 35-yard pass from Deshaun Watson (Kaʻimi Fairbairn kick), 2:04. Texans 30–29. **Drive: 8 plays, 80 yards, 2:02.**
- PHI – Jake Elliott 35-yard field goal, 0:03. Eagles 32–30. **Drive: 11 plays, 72 yards, 2:01.**

**Top passers**

- HOU – Deshaun Watson – 29/40, 339 yards, 2 TD
- PHI – Nick Foles – 35/49, 471 yards, 4 TD, INT

**Top rushers**

- HOU – Deshaun Watson – 8 rushes, 49 yards, 2 TD
- PHI – Darren Sproles – 9 rushes, 32 yards

**Top receivers**

- HOU – DeAndre Hopkins – 9 receptions, 104 yards
- PHI – Nelson Agholor – 5 receptions, 116 yards, TD

The Eagles defeated the Texans after a last-second field goal attempt from Jake Elliott was successful, despite turning the ball over three times and a late rally attempt by Houston. The offense continued dominating with Foles taking down another big opponent. The defense was solid despite the late collapse that could've ended their playoff hopes.

With the win, the Eagles advanced to 8–7 with higher hopes of making the playoffs only needing a win and a Vikings loss. The Eagles now have a record of 4–1 since a 48–7 loss to the Saints.

==== Week 17: at Washington Redskins ====
Week Seventeen: Philadelphia Eagles at Washington Redskins – Game summary

Quarter	1	2	3	4	Total
**Eagles**	3	7	7	7	**24**
Redskins	0	0	0	0	**0**

at FedEx Field, Landover, Maryland

- Date: December 30
- Game time: 4:25 pm. EST
- Game weather: 46 °F (8 °C), sunny
- Game attendance: 63,188
- Referee: Craig Wrolstad
- TV announcers (Fox): Chris Myers, Daryl Johnston and Laura Okmin
- Recap, Gamebook

Game information

**First quarter**

- PHI – Jake Elliott 33-yard field goal, 0:22. Eagles 3–0. **Drive: 11 plays, 64 yards, 6:20.**

**Second quarter**

- PHI – Alshon Jeffery 2-yard pass from Nick Foles (Jake Elliott kick), 0:30. Eagles 10–0. **Drive: 19 plays, 87 yards, 11:49.**

**Third quarter**

- PHI – Nelson Agholor 6-yard pass from Nick Foles (Jake Elliott kick), 1:25. Eagles 17–0. **Drive: 13 plays, 68 yards, 7:23.**

**Fourth quarter**

- PHI – Nelson Agholor 22-yard pass from Nate Sudfeld (Jake Elliott kick), 7:34. Eagles 24–0. **Drive: 5 plays, 46 yards, 3:56.**

**Top passers**

- PHI – Nick Foles – 28/33, 221 yards, 2 TD, INT
- WAS – Josh Johnson – 12/27, 91 yards, INT

**Top rushers**

- PHI – Wendell Smallwood – 12 rushes, 53 yards
- WAS – Chris Thompson – 2 rushes, 10 yards

**Top receivers**

- PHI – Alshon Jeffery – 5 receptions, 59 yards, TD
- WAS – Josh Doctson – 2 receptions, 33 yards

The Eagles entered Week 17 needing a win over the Redskins and help from the Chicago Bears to keep their playoff hopes alive. Philadelphia dominated Washington from start to finish in a 24–0 shutout win. The offense was consistent despite losing Foles midway through the fourth quarter dominating time of possession having the ball for over 40 minutes compared to just over 15 minutes for Washington. Third string QB Nate Sudfeld sealed the win with a 22-yard TD pass to Nelson Agholor. The defense shutdown QB Josh Johnson and the Redskins who were held to just 89 total yards and 8 first downs. CB Rasul Douglas set the tone early with an INT on the first play of the game.

With the win, the Eagles finished the 2018 season with a 9–7 record. The Eagles would eventually clinch the final playoff berth when the Bears defeated the Minnesota Vikings 24–10. The Eagles made the playoffs for consecutive seasons for the first time since the 2008–2010 seasons. The Eagles became the first defending champions to qualify for the postseason as a wild card team since the 2010 Saints.

=== Standings ===
==== Division ====
NFC East
	W	L	T	PCT	DIV	CONF	PF	PA	STK
^{(4)} Dallas Cowboys	10	6	0	.625	5–1	9–3	339	324	W2
^{(6)} Philadelphia Eagles	9	7	0	.563	4–2	6–6	367	348	W3
Washington Redskins	7	9	0	.438	2–4	6–6	281	359	L2
New York Giants	5	11	0	.313	1–5	4–8	369	412	L3

==== Conference ====
NFC
#	Team	Division	W	L	T	PCT	DIV	CONF	SOS	SOV	STK
**Division leaders**
1 (Note: New Orleans finished ahead of LA Rams based on head-to-head victory, claiming the No. 1 seed.)	New Orleans Saints	South	13	3	0	.813	4–2	9–3	.482	.488	L1
2	Los Angeles Rams	West	13	3	0	.813	6–0	9–3	.480	.428	W2
3	Chicago Bears	North	12	4	0	.750	5–1	10–2	.430	.419	W4
4	Dallas Cowboys	East	10	6	0	.625	5–1	9–3	.488	.444	W2
**Wild Cards**
5	Seattle Seahawks	West	10	6	0	.625	3–3	8–4	.484	.400	W2
6	Philadelphia Eagles	East	9	7	0	.563	4–2	6–6	.518	.486	W3
**Did not qualify for the postseason**
7	Minnesota Vikings	North	8	7	1	.531	3–2–1	6–5–1	.504	.355	L1
8 (Note: Atlanta finished ahead of Washington based on head-to-head victory. Atlanta finished ahead of Carolina based on head-to-head sweep. Washington finished ahead of Carolina based on head-to-head victory.)	Atlanta Falcons	South	7	9	0	.438	4–2	7–5	.482	.348	W3
9	Washington Redskins	East	7	9	0	.438	2–4	6–6	.486	.371	L2
10	Carolina Panthers	South	7	9	0	.438	2–4	5–7	.508	.518	W1
11	Green Bay Packers	North	6	9	1	.406	1–4–1	3–8–1	.488	.417	L1
12	Detroit Lions	North	6	10	0	.375	2–4	4–8	.504	.427	W1
13 (Note: NY Giants finished ahead of Tampa Bay based on head-to-head victory.)	New York Giants	East	5	11	0	.313	1–5	4–8	.527	.487	L3
14	Tampa Bay Buccaneers	South	5	11	0	.313	2–4	4–8	.523	.506	L4
15	San Francisco 49ers	West	4	12	0	.250	1–5	2–10	.504	.406	L2
16	Arizona Cardinals	West	3	13	0	.188	2–4	3–9	.527	.302	L4
**Tiebreakers** (Note: When breaking ties for three or more teams under the NFL's rules, they are first broken within divisions, then comparing only the highest-ranked remaining team from each division.)

== Postseason ==
=== Schedule ===
Round	Date	Opponent (seed)	Result	Record	Venue	Recap
Wild Card	January 6, 2019	at Chicago Bears (3)	W 16–15	1–0	Soldier Field	Recap
Divisional	January 13, 2019	at New Orleans Saints (1)	L 14–20	1–1	Mercedes-Benz Superdome	Recap

=== Game summaries ===
==== NFC Wild Card Playoffs: at (3) Chicago Bears ====
NFC Wild Card Playoffs: (6) Philadelphia Eagles at (3) Chicago Bears – Game summary

Quarter	1	2	3	4	Total
Eagles	3	0	7	6	16
Bears	0	6	0	9	15

at Soldier Field, Chicago, Illinois

- Date: January 6, 2019
- Game time: 4:40 p.m. EST/3:40 p.m. CST
- Game weather: 39 °F (4 °C), mostly cloudy
- Game attendance: 62,462
- Referee: Tony Corrente
- TV announcers (NBC): Al Michaels, Cris Collinsworth, Michele Tafoya and Terry McAulay
- Recap, Gamebook

Game information

First quarter

- PHI - Jake Elliott 43-yard field goal, 9:32. Eagles 3–0. Drive: 10 plays, 50 yards, 5:28.

Second quarter

- CHI - Cody Parkey 36-yard field goal, 9:38. Tied 3–3. Drive: 8 plays, 47 yards, 4:43.
- CHI - Cody Parkey 29-yard field goal, 0:00. Bears 6–3. Drive: 13 plays, 78 yards, 2:38.

Third quarter

- PHI - Dallas Goedert 10-yard pass from Nick Foles (Jake Elliott kick), 5:20. Eagles 10–6. Drive: 7 plays, 83 yards, 4:23.

Fourth quarter

- CHI - Cody Parkey 34-yard field goal, 14:13. Eagles 10–9. Drive: 6 plays, 62 yards, 2:20.
- CHI - Allen Robinson 22-yard pass from Mitchell Trubisky (pass failed), 9:04. Bears 15–10. Drive: 6 plays, 80 yards, 2:56.
- PHI - Golden Tate 2-yard pass from Nick Foles (run failed), 0:56. Eagles 16–15. Drive: 12 yards, 60 yards, 3:52.

Top passers

- PHI – Nick Foles – 25/40, 226 yards, 2 TD, 2 INT
- CHI – Mitchell Trubisky – 26/43, 303 yards, TD

Top rushers

- PHI – Darren Sproles – 13 rushes, 21 yards
- CHI – Jordan Howard – 10 rushes, 35 yards

Top receivers

- PHI – Alshon Jeffery – 6 receptions, 82 yards
- CHI – Allen Robinson – 10 receptions, 143 yards, TD

The Eagles started their playoff run by traveling to Chicago to square off against Mitchell Trubisky and the Bears, who helped the Eagles get to the playoffs in the first place. In an intense defensive battle, the Eagles got the edge with a Golden Tate TD with just under a minute left. The Bears drove down the field, but after an upright and crossbar "Double Doink" by Bears kicker Cody Parkey (also a former Eagles kicker), the Eagles narrowly escaped the Windy City with a 16–15 win and advanced to New Orleans for a rematch.

The Eagles won their first road playoff game since 2008.

==== NFC Divisional Playoffs: at (1) New Orleans Saints ====
NFC Divisional Playoffs: (6) Philadelphia Eagles at (1) New Orleans Saints – Game summary

Quarter	1	2	3	4	Total
Eagles	14	0	0	0	14
Saints	0	10	7	3	20

at Mercedes-Benz Superdome, New Orleans, Louisiana

- Date: January 13, 2019
- Game time: 4:40 pm. EST/3:40 pm. CST
- Game weather: Played indoors (domed stadium)
- Game attendance: 73,027
- Referee: Carl Cheffers
- TV announcers (Fox): Kevin Burkhardt, Charles Davis, Pam Oliver and Peter Schrager
- Recap, Gamebook

Game information

First quarter

- PHI – Jordan Matthews 37-yard pass from Nick Foles (Jake Elliott kick), 10:41. Eagles 7–0. Drive: 7 plays, 76 yards, 4:05.
- PHI – Nick Foles 1-yard rush (Jake Elliott kick), 4:37. Eagles 14–0. Drive: 10 plays, 75 yards, 5:14.

Second quarter

- NO – Keith Kirkwood 2-yard pass from Drew Brees (Wil Lutz kick), 7:23. Eagles 14–7. Drive: 12 plays, 79 yards, 6:12.
- NO – Wil Lutz 45-yard field goal, 0:06. Eagles 14–10. Drive: 7 plays, 67 yards, 1:12.

Third quarter

- NO – Michael Thomas 2-yard pass from Drew Brees (Wil Lutz kick), 1:40. Saints 17–14. Drive: 18 plays, 92 yards, 11:29.

Fourth quarter

- NO – Wil Lutz 39-yard field goal, 10:28. Saints 20–14. Drive: 8 plays, 62 yards, 3:31.

Top passers

- PHI – Nick Foles – 18/31, 201 yards, TD, 2 INT
- NO – Drew Brees – 28/38, 301 yards, 2 TD, INT

Top rushers

- PHI – Wendell Smallwood – 10 carries, 33 yards
- NO – Alvin Kamara – 16 carries, 71 yards

Top receivers

- PHI – Alshon Jeffery – 5 receptions, 63 yards
- NO – Michael Thomas – 12 receptions, 171 yards, TD

The Eagles traveled to New Orleans to face the Saints in a rematch of the Week 11 game which ended in a 48–7 rout in the Saints' favor. Despite jumping out to an early 14–0 first-quarter lead over the top-seeded Saints on touchdowns by Jordan Matthews and Nick Foles, the Eagles could not keep up the pace. New Orleans responded with 20 unanswered points over the final three-quarters, including the eventual game-winning third-quarter touchdown pass from Drew Brees to Michael Thomas, to defeat the Eagles 20–14 and end Philadelphia's reign as Super Bowl Champions. The loss was just the second career postseason loss for Foles, the other being a 26–24 loss in the 2013 season, also to the Saints. New Orleans' victory over Philadelphia meant that, for the 14th straight season, a new Super Bowl champion would be crowned.
