= Zach Ertz =

American football player (born 1990)

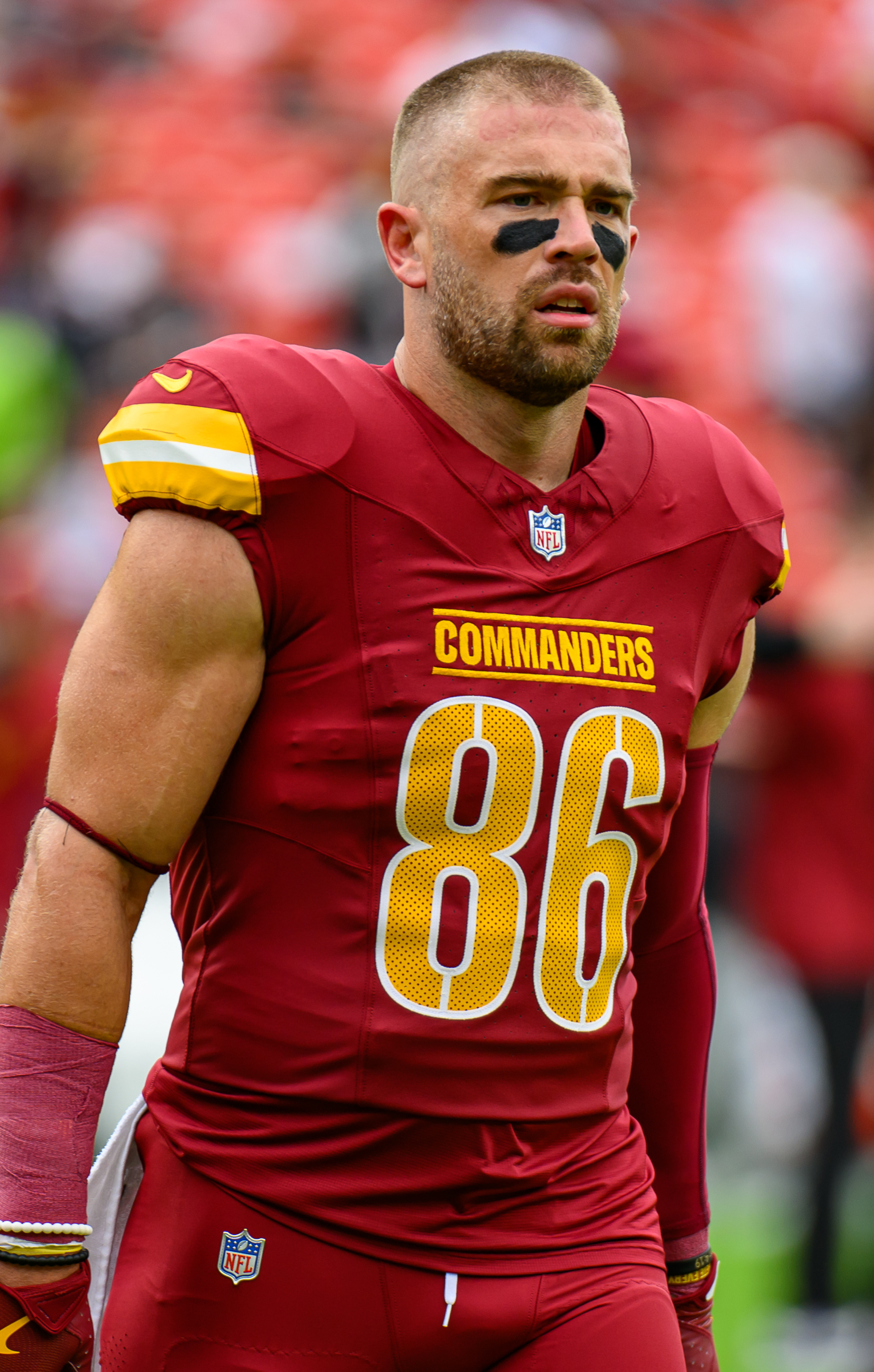
- Ertz with the Washington Commanders in 2025

No. 86 – Philadelphia Eagles
- Position: Tight end
- Roster status: Active

Personal information
- Born: November 10, 1990 (age 36); Orange, California, U.S.
- Listed height: 6 ft 5 in (1.96 m)
- Listed weight: 250 lb (113 kg)

Career information
- High school: Monte Vista (Danville, California)
- College: Stanford (2009–2012)
- NFL draft: 2013: 2nd round, 35th overall pick

Career history
- Philadelphia Eagles (2013–2021); Arizona Cardinals (2021–2023); Detroit Lions (2023)*; Washington Commanders (2024–2025); Philadelphia Eagles (2026–present)
- * Offseason or practice squad member only

Awards and highlights
- Super Bowl champion (LII); 3× Pro Bowl (2017–2019); Ozzie Newsome Award (2012); Unanimous All-American (2012); First-team All-Pac-12 (2012); NFL records: Most successful two-point conversion attempts: 7 (tied with Marshall Faulk, Alvin Kamara and Saquon Barkley)

Career NFL statistics as of Week 5, 2026
- Receptions: 828
- Receiving yards: 8,614
- Receiving touchdowns: 57
- Stats at Pro Football Reference

Zachary Adam Ertz (born November 10, 1990) is an American professional football tight end for the Philadelphia Eagles of the National Football League (NFL). He played college football for the Stanford Cardinal and was selected by the Philadelphia Eagles in the second round of the 2013 NFL draft. Ertz played nine seasons with the Eagles, making three Pro Bowls and winning Super Bowl LII with them. He set the NFL record for most receptions in a season by a tight end in 2018, which stood until eclipsed by Trey McBride in 2025. Ertz has also been a member of the Arizona Cardinals, Detroit Lions, and Washington Commanders. His wife Julie is a former player for the U.S. national soccer team.

== Early life ==
Born in Orange, California, Ertz grew up as the oldest of four children. His father played for the Lehigh University football team from 1981 to 1984. Ertz played high school football and basketball at Monte Vista High School in Danville, California. As a senior, he had 56 receptions, 756 receiving yards, and 14 receiving touchdowns for the football team and was named to the All-East Bay Athletic League first team.

== College career ==
Ertz attended Stanford University, where he played football for the Cardinal from 2009 to 2012. He redshirted the 2009 season. In 2010, he played 13 games and had 16 catches for 190 yards and five touchdowns. He had two receptions, including a touchdown, in the Orange Bowl against Virginia Tech that year.

Ertz had 27 receptions, 343 receiving yards, and four receiving touchdowns in 2011, despite missing three games due to a knee injury. In the Fiesta Bowl, he had four catches and one touchdown against Oklahoma State. The following season, as a junior, Ertz had 69 catches, 898 receiving yards, and six touchdowns. He had three catches for 61 yards in the Rose Bowl. His 898 receiving yards was the most by an FBS tight end that season. He was a unanimous All-American, a finalist for the Mackey Award, and an All-Pac-12 first team selection.

After the 2012 season, Ertz announced that he would enter the NFL draft.

== Professional career ==
=== Pre-draft ===
On January 8, 2013, Ertz announced, through a statement released by Stanford, his decision to forgo his senior season and enter the 2013 NFL Draft. He was ranked as the second best tight end prospect in the draft by ESPN Scouts Inc. He was one of 19 tight ends to attend the NFL Scouting Combine in Indianapolis, Indiana. He completed all of the combine and positional drills and finished second in the bench press, third in the three-cone drill, and finished ninth, among all tight ends, in the 40-yard dash.

On March 24, 2013, Ertz attended Stanford's pro day and opted to perform some of the drills again in an attempt to shorten some of his times and increase his vertical and broad jump. He successfully posted better numbers in the 40-yard dash (4.67s), 20-yard dash (2.74s), 10-yard dash (1.64s), vertical jump (35.5"), and broad jump (9'6"). During the pre-draft process, he attended private visits and workouts with the Atlanta Falcons and Philadelphia Eagles. At the conclusion of the pre-draft process, Ertz was projected to be a late first round pick or second round pick in the draft by NFL draft experts and scouts. He was ranked the second best tight end prospect in the draft by Sports Illustrated, DraftScout.com, SBNation, and NFL analysts Mike Mayock, Mel Kiper, and Rob Rang. Ertz was also ranked the fifth best tight end by NFL analyst Josh Norris.

Pre-draft measurables
| Height | Weight | Arm length | Hand span | Wingspan | 40-yard dash | 10-yard split | 20-yard split | 20-yard shuttle | Three-cone drill | Vertical jump | Broad jump | Bench press | Wonderlic |
|---|---|---|---|---|---|---|---|---|---|---|---|---|---|
| 6 ft 5 in (1.96 m) | 249 lb (113 kg) | 31 3/4 in (0.81 m) | 9 3/4 in (0.25 m) | 6 ft 4 1/4 in (1.94 m) | 4.67 s | 1.64 s | 2.74 s | 4.47 s | 7.08 s | 35.5 in (0.90 m) | 9 ft 6 in (2.90 m) | 24 reps | 26 |
All values from NFL Combine/Pro Day

=== Philadelphia Eagles (first stint) ===
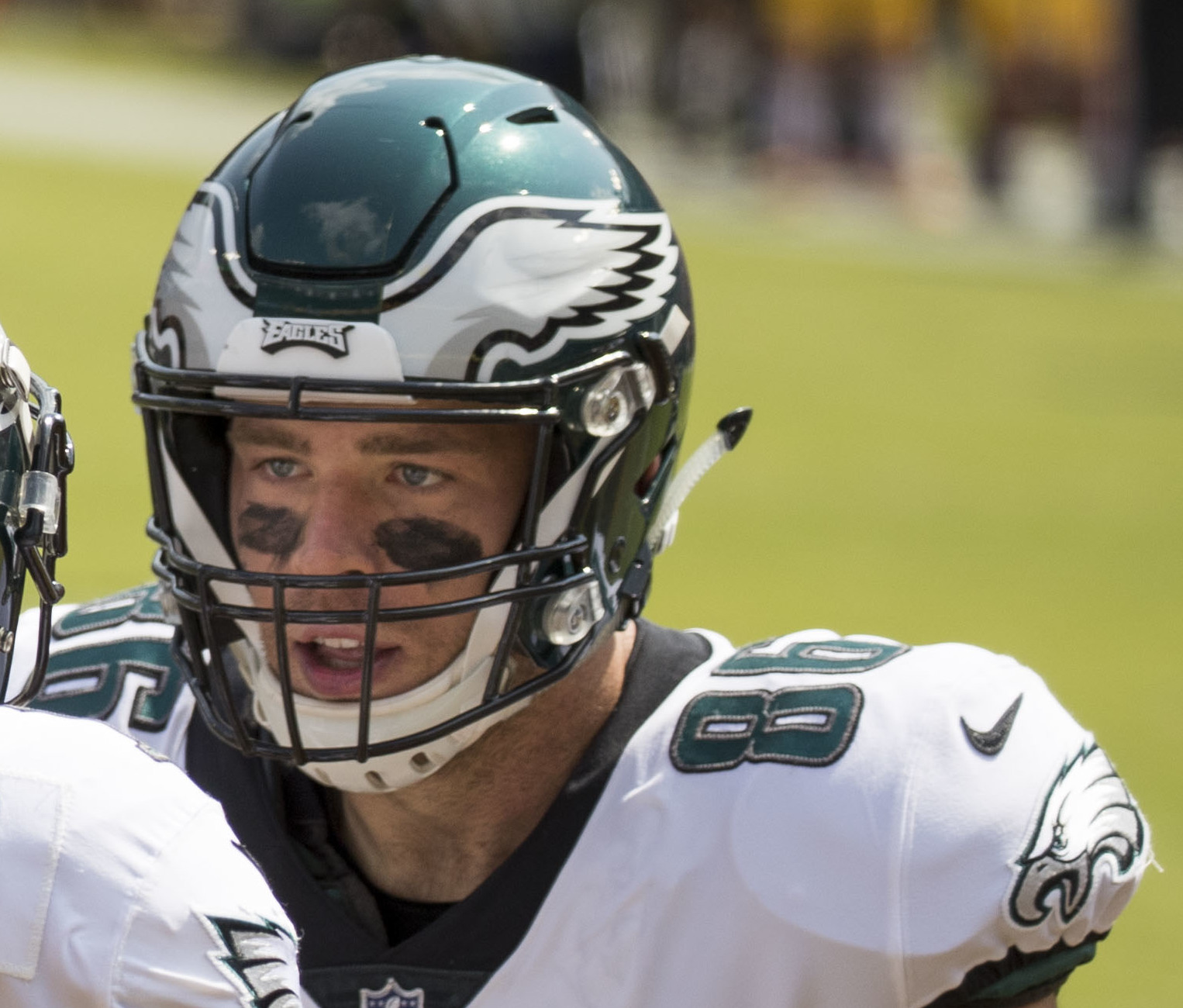
Ertz with the Philadelphia Eagles in 2017

==== 2013 ====
The Philadelphia Eagles selected Ertz in the second round (35th overall) of the 2013 NFL draft. He was the second tight end drafted behind Notre Dame's Tyler Eifert, but ahead of future Pro Bowlers Travis Kelce and Jordan Reed and fellow Stanford teammate Levine Toilolo. Head coach Chip Kelly explained the selection of Ertz and his plan to use three-tight end sets that had been successfully used by the New England Patriots.

On May 9, 2013, the Philadelphia Eagles signed Ertz to a four-year, $5.37 million contract that included $3.65 million guaranteed and a signing bonus of $2.29 million.

Ertz was unable to attend organized team activities due to the NFL's policy on players completing their college quarter before joining their team's off-season programs. He arrived in June and joined the team in time to participate in the Eagles' minicamp. Throughout training camp, he competed to be the No. 2 tight end on the depth chart against veterans James Casey and Clay Harbor. Head coach Chip Kelly named Ertz the third tight end on the depth chart to begin the regular season, behind Brent Celek and James Casey.

He made his professional regular season debut in the Philadelphia Eagles' season-opener at the Washington Redskins and made his first career reception on an 11-yard pass by Michael Vick in the first quarter of their 33–27 victory. He was targeted three times, but only finished with one reception. On September 29, 2013, Ertz earned his first career start after surpassing James Casey on the depth chart and was designated as the top receiving option at tight end. He finished the Eagles' 52–20 loss at the Denver Broncos with one reception for 38 yards. In Week 9, he made five receptions for 42 yards and caught his first career touchdown during a 49–20 victory at the Oakland Raiders. He scored his first career touchdown on a 15-yard pass from quarterback Nick Foles in the second quarter and caught the fourth of the NFL-record tying seven touchdown passes thrown by Foles during the game. On December 1, 2013, Ertz made five catches for a season-high 68 receiving yards and two touchdowns during a 24–21 win against the Arizona Cardinals in Week 13. It marked his first career game with multiple touchdown receptions. In Week 15, he caught a season-high six passes for 57 yards in the Eagles' 48–30 loss at the Minnesota Vikings. He finished his rookie season in 2013 with 36 receptions for 469 receiving yards and four touchdowns in 16 games and three starts.

The Philadelphia Eagles finished first in the NFC East with a 10–6 record in their first season under head coach Chip Kelly. On January 4, 2014, Ertz appeared in his first career playoff game and made three receptions for 22 yards and caught a seven-yard touchdown pass from quarterback Nick Foles in the Eagles' 26–24 loss to the New Orleans Saints in the NFC Wild Card Round.

==== 2014 ====
Ertz returned as the primary receiving tight end in 2014, but remained second on the Eagles' depth chart behind Brent Celek who was more well rounded and able to receive, but was used primarily as a blocking tight end. In Week 14, he made two receptions for 39 yards and caught a season-long 35-yard touchdown in the Eagles' 24–14 loss to the Seattle Seahawks. On December 20, 2014, Ertz caught a career-high 15 receptions for 115 receiving yards during a 27–24 loss at the Washington Redskins in Week 16. He finished his second season with 58 receptions for 702 yards and three touchdowns in 16 games and five starts. Although the Philadelphia Eagles finished with a 10–6 record, they did not qualify for the playoffs.

==== 2015 ====
Ertz remained the second tight end on the Eagles' depth chart, behind Brent Celek, for the third consecutive season. On November 22, 2015, Ertz caught two passes for 12 yards before exiting the Eagles' 45–17 loss to the Tampa Bay Buccaneers in the second quarter after sustaining an injury. During the course of the play, he caught a pass from quarterback Mark Sanchez, hurdled cornerback Sterling Moore, and was immediately hit by linebacker Lavonte David. The impact with David turned Ertz around and caused him to fall directly on his neck. He was able to avoid any serious injuries to his neck, but sustained a concussion and was sidelined for the Eagles' Week 12 loss at the Detroit Lions. On December 22, 2015, Ertz caught a season-high 13 passes for 122 receiving yards in the Eagles' 38–24 loss to the Washington Redskins in Week 16. On December 29, 2015, the Philadelphia Eagles fired head coach Chip Kelly after their loss to Washington left them with a 6–9 record. Offensive coordinator Pat Shurmur was named interim coach for the season's final game, a 35–30 victory at the New York Giants in which Ertz had nine receptions for a career-high 152 yards. Ertz finished his third season with 75 receptions for 853 receiving yards and two touchdowns in 15 games and seven starts. His 75 receptions finished second on the team. Although Celek remained the No. 1 tight end throughout the majority of the season, Ertz received more snaps, finishing with 789 offensive snaps (68.25%) to Celek's 600 snaps (51.9%).

==== 2016 ====
On January 25, 2016, the Philadelphia Eagles signed Ertz to a five-year, $42.5 million contract extension that included $21 million guaranteed and an $8 million signing bonus. He displaced a rib by his collarbone in the season-opener against the Cleveland Browns and was sidelined for the next two games. On December 12, 2016, Ertz made ten receptions for 112 receiving yards in the Eagles' 27–22 loss against the Washington Redskins in Week 14. In Week 17, he caught a season-high 13 passes for 139 yards and two touchdowns in their 27–13 win against the Dallas Cowboys. Ertz finished the 2016 season with 78 receptions for 816 receiving yards and four touchdowns in 14 games and 14 starts. He led the Eagles in touchdown receptions, receiving yards, and receptions.

==== 2017 ====
In Week 6, Ertz caught two passes for 18 yards and two touchdowns from Carson Wentz during a 28–23 victory at the Carolina Panthers. On October 29, 2017, Ertz caught four passes for 34 receiving yards and a touchdown in the Eagles' 33–10 win against the San Francisco 49ers. From Weeks 5–8 he caught five touchdown receptions and had six touchdowns total. He sustained a hamstring injury during their game against the 49ers and was sidelined for the following week (Week 9). In Week 12, he caught ten passes for 103 yards and a touchdown during a 31–3 victory against the Chicago Bears. He became the first player on the Eagles' roster to catch ten passes and have over 100 receiving yards in 2017. On December 3, 2017, Ertz caught two passes for 24 yards before exiting the Eagles' 24–10 loss at the Seattle Seahawks in the third quarter after sustaining a concussion while attempting to make a catch that was defended by Bradley McDougald. He remained in concussion protocol and was sidelined for their Week 14 victory at the Los Angeles Rams. On December 19, 2017, Ertz was named to his first Pro Bowl, but was unable to participate due to the Eagles' playoff success. He finished the 2017 season with 74 receptions for 824 receiving yards and a career-high eight touchdowns in 14 games and 14 starts. Pro Football Focus gave Ertz an overall grade of 82.5, ranking him fifth among all qualifying tight ends. He has been ranked 68th by his peers on the NFL Top 100 Players of 2018.

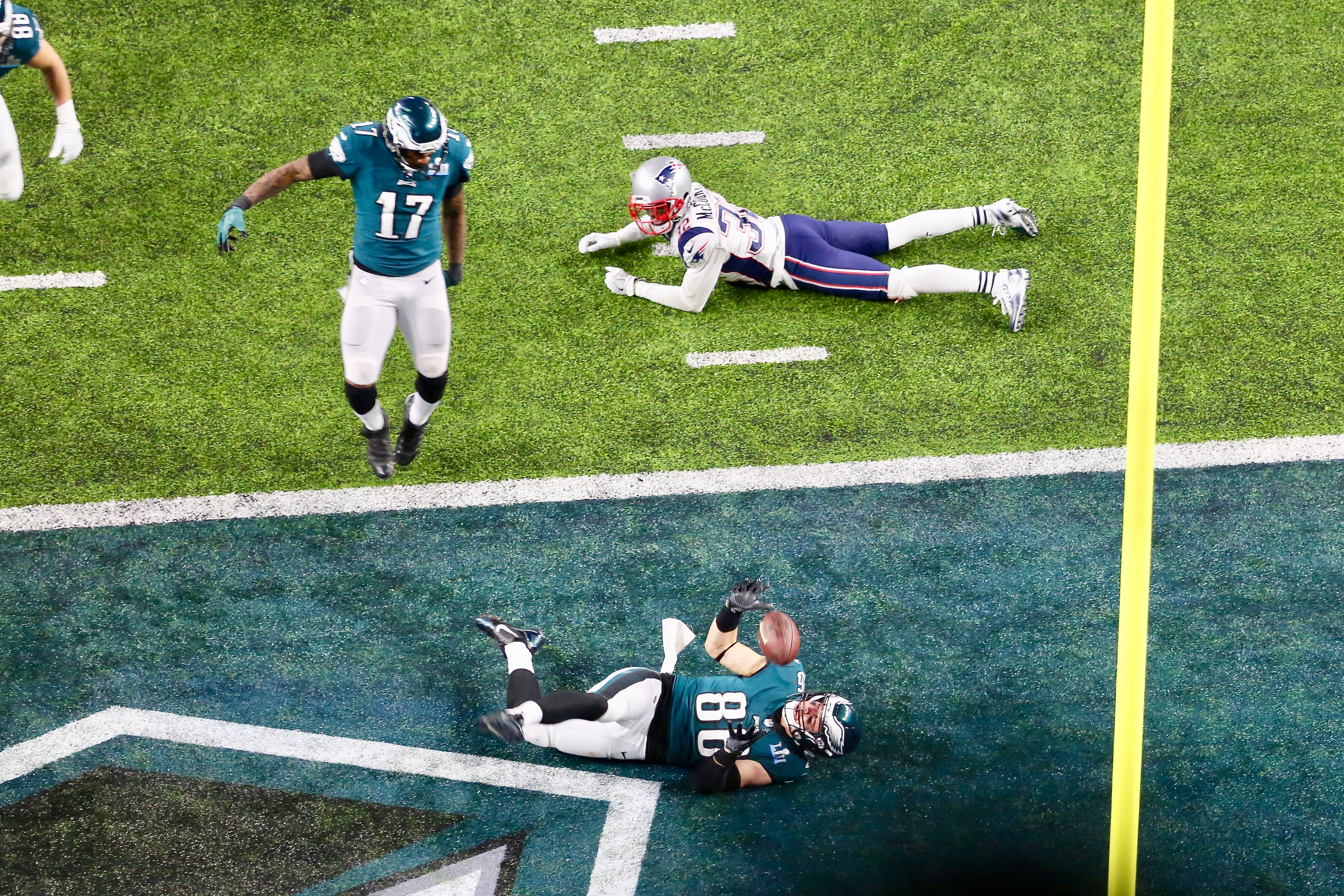
Ertz catching a touchdown in Super Bowl LII

The Philadelphia Eagles finished atop the NFC East with a 13–3 record, clinching a first round bye and home-field advantage. In the 15–10 victory over the Atlanta Falcons in the Divisional Round, he had three receptions for 32 yards. On January 21, 2018, Ertz made his first career start in the playoffs and caught eight passes for 93 yards during a 38–7 victory against the Minnesota Vikings in the NFC Championship.

On February 4, 2018, Ertz started in Super Bowl LII and caught seven passes for 67 yards and a touchdown. During the fourth quarter, he caught the go-ahead touchdown reception on a seven-yard pass by Nick Foles, after beating safety Devin McCourty on a slant route, to put the Eagles up 38–33. The Philadelphia Eagles defeated the New England Patriots 41–33 to win Super Bowl LII, marking their first Super Bowl victory in franchise history.

==== 2018 ====
Ertz's sixth season with the Eagles began with five receptions for 48 yards in an 18–12 victory over the Atlanta Falcons, but he had 11 receptions for 94 yards in a Week 2 loss to the Tampa Bay Buccaneers. During Week 4, Ertz totaled 10 receptions for 112 yards in an overtime loss to the Tennessee Titans. He followed that up with 10 receptions for 110 yards and a touchdown in the loss to the Minnesota Vikings in Week 5. After another touchdown in a win over the New York Giants, a Week 7 loss to the Carolina Panthers saw Ertz record nine receptions for 138 receiving yards. He topped that two games later, with 14 receptions for 145 yards (both career second-bests), and two touchdowns, both of which tied the game in the second half though the Eagles ultimately lost to the Dallas Cowboys. During the Eagles' Week 16 win over the Houston Texans, Ertz broke Jason Witten's NFL record for most receptions by a tight end with 113. He ended the game with 12 receptions for 110 yards, along with two receiving touchdowns for the fifth time in his career. He also had a 20-yard reception with 1:29 left to set up the game-winning and playoff-hope-preserving field goal. He was named to the Pro Bowl for his 2018 season. He ended the season with 116 receptions, 1,163 yards, and eight touchdowns. The Eagles returned to the playoffs and faced off against the Chicago Bears in the Wild Card Round. In the 16–15 victory, he had five receptions for 52 yards. In the Divisional Round against the New Orleans Saints, he had five receptions for 50 yards in the 20–14 loss. He was ranked 40th by his peers on the NFL Top 100 Players of 2019.

==== 2019 ====
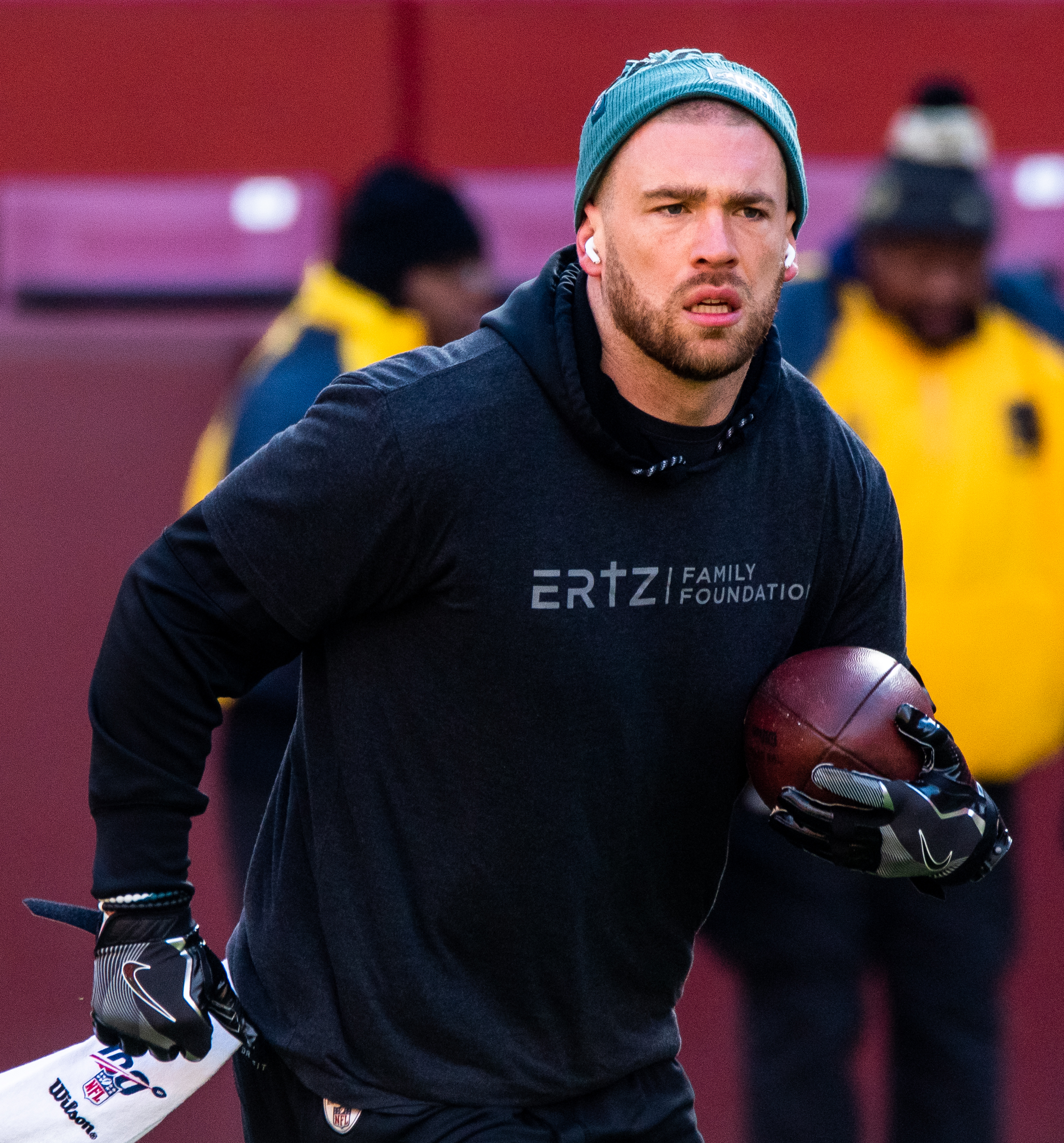
Ertz warming-up before a game in 2019

In Week 9 against the Chicago Bears, Ertz caught a season high nine passes for 103 yards and a touchdown in the 22–14 win. In Week 12 against the Seattle Seahawks, Ertz caught 12 passes for 91 yards and a touchdown in the 17–9 loss. In Week 14 against the New York Giants, Ertz caught nine catches for 91 yards and two touchdowns, including the game winner, which sealed a 23–17 overtime win for the Eagles. Overall, in the 2019 season, Ertz finished with 88 receptions for 916 receiving yards and six receiving touchdowns. He earned a Pro Bowl nomination for his 2019 season. He was ranked 85th by his peers on the NFL Top 100 Players of 2020.

==== 2020 ====
In Week 6, Ertz suffered a high ankle sprain and was ruled out 4–6 weeks. He was placed on injured reserve on October 22, 2020. He was activated on December 2, 2020. In the 2020 season, Ertz finished with 36 receptions for 335 receiving yards and one receiving touchdown.

=== Arizona Cardinals ===
==== 2021 ====
Ertz was traded to the Arizona Cardinals on October 15, 2021, in exchange for cornerback Tay Gowan and a fifth-round selection in the 2022 NFL draft. In the 2021 season, Ertz finished with 74 receptions for 763 receiving yards and five receiving touchdowns.

==== 2022 ====
On March 13, 2022, Ertz signed a three-year, $31.65 million extension with the Cardinals. He suffered a season-ending knee injury in Week 10 and was placed on injured reserve on November 26, 2022. He appeared in and started ten games in the 2022 season. He finished with 47 receptions for 406 receiving yards and four receiving touchdowns.

==== 2023 ====
On October 24, 2023, Ertz was placed on injured reserve with a quadriceps injury. He was waived on November 30, following his request to be released. In seven games with the Cardinals, he had 27 receptions for 187 yards and one touchdown.

=== Detroit Lions ===
On January 22, 2024, Ertz signed with the Detroit Lions practice squad as a result of an injury to Brock Wright. His contract expired when the team's season ended on January 28, 2024.

=== Washington Commanders ===
==== 2024 ====
On March 12, 2024, Ertz signed a one-year contract with the Washington Commanders. In a Week 17 win over the Atlanta Falcons, Ertz recorded six receptions for 72 receiving yards and two touchdowns, including the game-winning score in overtime that clinched the Commanders' playoff berth. He finished the 2024 season with 66 receptions for 654 yards and seven touchdowns. Visiting his former team in the 2024 NFC Championship Game, Ertz compiled a team leading 11 receptions for 104 yards on 16 targets despite the 55–23 loss.

==== 2025 ====
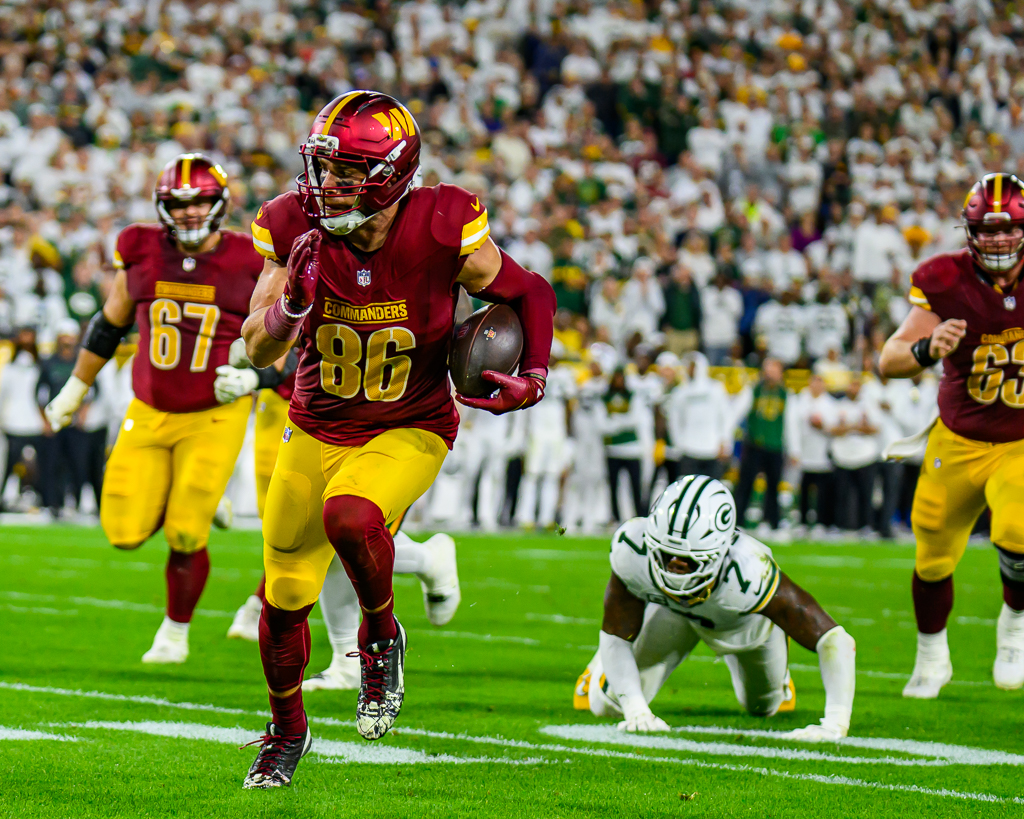
Ertz playing against the Green Bay Packers in 2025

On March 11, 2025, Ertz re-signed with the Commanders on a one-year, $6.25 million contract. In Week 13 of the 2025 season, Ertz caught his 816th reception, making him the fifth ranked tight end with the most receptions in NFL history and surpassing Shannon Sharpe. On December 7, 2025, during a game against the Minnesota Vikings, Ertz's right leg was hit by the Vikings' Jay Ward while Ertz was in the air attempting to make a catch. The hit buckled Ertz's knee, and he was helped off the field and then carted to the locker room. Three days later, the Commanders placed him on injured reserve due to a torn ACL in his right knee.

=== Philadelphia Eagles (second stint) ===
On September 21, 2026, Ertz signed with the Philadelphia Eagles' practice squad. He was promoted to the active roster on November 16.

== Career statistics ==
Legend
| | Won the Super Bowl |
| **Bold** | Career high |

=== NFL ===
==== Regular season ====
| Year | Team | Games | | Receiving | | | | | Rushing | | | | | Fumbles | |
| Year | Team | GP | GS | Rec | Yds | Avg | Lng | TD | Att | Yds | Avg | Lng | TD | Fum | Lost |
|---|---|---|---|---|---|---|---|---|---|---|---|---|---|---|---|
| 2013 | PHI | 16 | 3 | 36 | 469 | **13.0** | 38 | 4 | — | — | — | — | — | 0 | 0 |
| 2014 | PHI | 16 | 5 | 58 | 702 | 12.1 | 35 | 3 | — | — | — | — | — | **1** | **1** |
| 2015 | PHI | 15 | 7 | 75 | 853 | 11.4 | **60** | 2 | — | — | — | — | — | **1** | **1** |
| 2016 | PHI | 14 | 12 | 78 | 816 | 10.5 | 30 | 4 | — | — | — | — | — | 0 | 0 |
| 2017 | PHI | 14 | 13 | 74 | 824 | 11.1 | 53 | **8** | — | — | — | — | — | **1** | **1** |
| 2018 | PHI | 16 | 16 | **116** | **1,163** | 10.0 | 34 | **8** | — | — | — | — | — | **1** | 0 |
| 2019 | PHI | 15 | 15 | 88 | 916 | 10.4 | 30 | 6 | — | — | — | — | — | **1** | **1** |
| 2020 | PHI | 11 | 11 | 36 | 335 | 9.3 | 42 | 1 | — | — | — | — | — | 0 | 0 |
| 2021 | PHI | 6 | 3 | 18 | 189 | 10.5 | 28 | 2 | — | — | — | — | — | 0 | 0 |
| 2021 | ARI | 11 | 11 | 56 | 574 | 10.3 | 47 | 3 | **1** | **4** | **4.0** | **4** | 0 | 0 | 0 |
| 2022 | ARI | 10 | 10 | 47 | 406 | 8.6 | 32 | 4 | — | — | — | — | — | 0 | 0 |
| 2023 | ARI | 7 | 7 | 27 | 187 | 6.9 | 17 | 1 | — | — | — | — | — | 0 | 0 |
| 2024 | WAS | 17 | 17 | 66 | 654 | 9.9 | 37 | 7 | — | — | — | — | — | **1** | 0 |
| 2025 | WAS | 13 | 13 | 50 | 504 | 10.1 | 30 | 4 | — | — | — | — | — | **1** | 0 |
| 2026 | PHI | 3 | 0 | 3 | 22 | 7.3 | 9 | 0 | — | — | — | — | — | 0 | 0 |
| Career | | 184 | 143 | 828 | 8,614 | 10.4 | 60 | 57 | 1 | 4 | 4.0 | 4 | 0 | 7 | 4 |

==== Postseason ====
| Year | Team | Games | | Receiving | | | | | Fumbles | |
| Year | Team | GP | GS | Rec | Yds | Avg | Lng | TD | Fum | Lost |
|---|---|---|---|---|---|---|---|---|---|---|
| 2013 | PHI | 1 | 0 | 3 | 22 | 7.3 | 15 | **1** | 0 | 0 |
| 2017 | PHI | 3 | 2 | **18** | **192** | 10.7 | **36** | **1** | 0 | 0 |
| 2018 | PHI | 2 | 2 | 10 | 102 | 10.2 | 17 | 0 | 0 | 0 |
| 2019 | PHI | 1 | 1 | 2 | 44 | **22.0** | 32 | 0 | 0 | 0 |
| 2021 | ARI | 1 | 1 | 3 | 21 | 7.0 | 12 | 0 | 0 | 0 |
| 2024 | WAS | 3 | 3 | **18** | 155 | 8.6 | 21 | **1** | 0 | 0 |
| Career | | 11 | 9 | 54 | 536 | 9.9 | 36 | 3 | 0 | 0 |

=== College ===
College statistics
| Season | GP | Receiving | | | |
| Season | GP | Rec | Yds | Avg | TD |
|---|---|---|---|---|---|
| 2010 | 13 | 16 | 190 | 11.9 | 5 |
| 2011 | 10 | 27 | 346 | 12.8 | 4 |
| 2012 | 14 | **69** | **898** | **13.0** | **6** |
| Career | 37 | 112 | 1,434 | 12.8 | 15 |

== Career highlights ==
=== Awards and honors ===
NFL

- Super Bowl champion (LII)
- 3× Pro Bowl (2017–2019)
- 3× NFL Top 100 — 68th (2018), 40th (2019), 85th (2020)

College

- Ozzie Newsome Award (2012)
- Unanimous All-American (2012)
- First-team All-Pac-12 (2012)

=== Records ===
==== NFL records ====
- Career 2-point conversions scored: 7 (tied with Marshall Faulk, Alvin Kamara and Saquon Barkley)

==== Eagles franchise records ====
- Most receptions in a single game: 15
- Most receptions in a single season: 116 (2018)

== Personal life ==
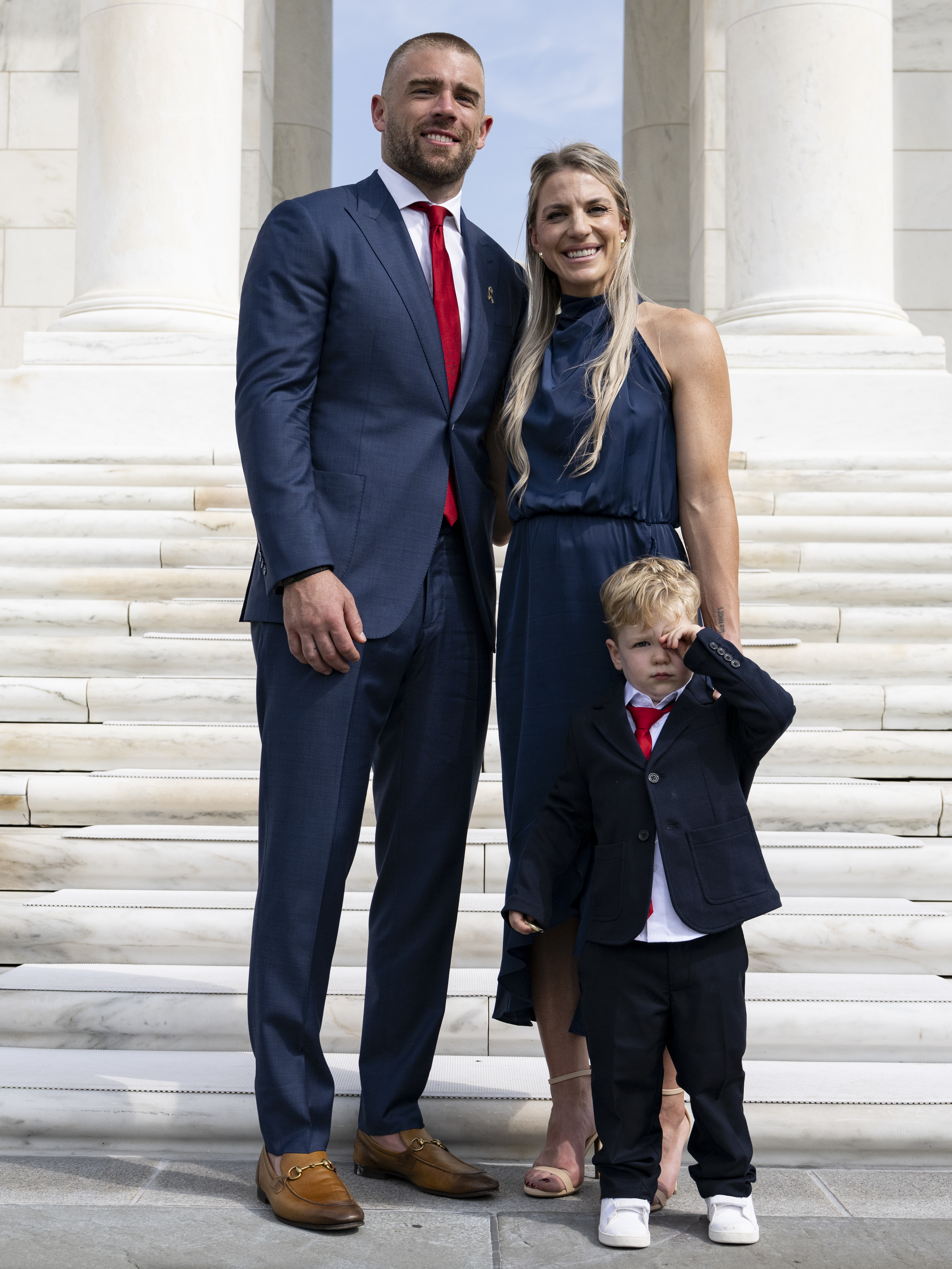
Ertz, his wife Julie, and their son Madden at the Tomb of the Unknown Soldier in Arlington National Cemetery, 2025

Ertz is a Christian. On February 26, 2016, Ertz proposed to professional soccer player Julie Johnston, then a starting defensive midfielder for the U.S. women's national team, at Klein Field, the Stanford University baseball stadium where they first met. They married on March 26, 2017, in Goleta, California. They were featured in ESPN's The Body Issue magazine in 2017. The couple's first child, a son named Madden, was born on August 11, 2022. The couple welcomed twin sons Kace and Kyren on August 24, 2024.
