= Rickie Ricardo =

Spanish-language US sportscaster

- Born: Jorge Lima Jr. 1962 (age 63–64); Newark, New Jersey, U.S.
- Education: Adelphi University
- Occupations: Radio sports talk-show host, disc jockey
- Years active: 1981–present

Rickie Ricardo (born Jorge Lima Jr.;1962) is an American sportscaster, talk show host, and voice-over actor. He calls games in Spanish for the New York Yankees, the Philadelphia Eagles, and the Philadelphia Phillies. He also hosts programs related to these teams.

== Music broadcasting ==
Born in Newark, New Jersey, in 1962, Ricardo attended broadcasting school, graduating in 1980, with the intention of being a disc jockey. He met Frankie Crocker in Miami Beach; after a successful audition, Crocker gave him his nickname and Ricardo started a midday shift on WBLS in 1981. Crocker also introduced Ricardo to Rick James; James later made Ricardo his master of ceremonies for six years.

In 1992, at New York's WSKQ-FM, Ricardo helped to create and name the "Mega" brand targeted at bilingual Hispanic listeners.

== Sports broadcasting ==
After the Florida Marlins (now Miami Marlins) dumped many of their stars in a fire sale after winning the 2003 World Series, the club sought Ricardo's help to attract young Latino fans. He started doing Spanish-language play-by-play as a fill-in in 2005. The next year he started broadcasting Philadelphia Phillies games in Spanish. He also hosted an English-language sports talk show on WIP-FM in Philadelphia which led to him becoming the Eagles' Spanish-language announcer on WEMG. From June 20 to 22, 2022, during a Yankees road series at the Tampa Bay Rays, Ricardo filled in for John Sterling on the Yankees' English-language play-by-play radio call on WFAN-AM.

Mark Chernoff, program director of WFAN, hired Ricardo in 2014 to be the Spanish radio voice of the New York Yankees on sister station WADO. Ricardo is credited along with WFAN salesman Joe Rojas for growing Spanish-language ad sales on Yankee games from just over $300,000 to nearly $2 million between 2014 and 2017.

Ricardo cites as his sportscasting influences Jon Miller, English-language voice of the San Francisco Giants, and Felo Ramírez, Spanish-language voice of the Marlins.

=== Notable calls ===
In football, Ricardo is known for his calls following successful and unsuccessful field goals. After Jake Elliott's 61-yard game-ending field goal helped the Eagles defeat the New York Giants in 2017, Ricardo said ¡Sí, señor! (Yes, sir!) five times. When Cody Parkey kicked the infamous Double Doink, a blocked field goal that caused the Eagles to defeat the Chicago Bears and advance in the 2018–19 NFL playoffs, he shouted ¡No, señor! six times in a call that went viral.

== Personal life ==
Ricardo is of Cuban ancestry.

Ricardo lives in Edgewater, New Jersey. On September 1, 2021, after a Yankees game called remotely from Yankee Stadium, Yankees broadcaster John Sterling (also an Edgewater resident) was stranded in his car by flooding following Hurricane Ida. Ricardo was driving his Jeep Cherokee home and rescued Sterling, driving both home safely.
