= Mitchell Trubisky =

American football player (born 1994)

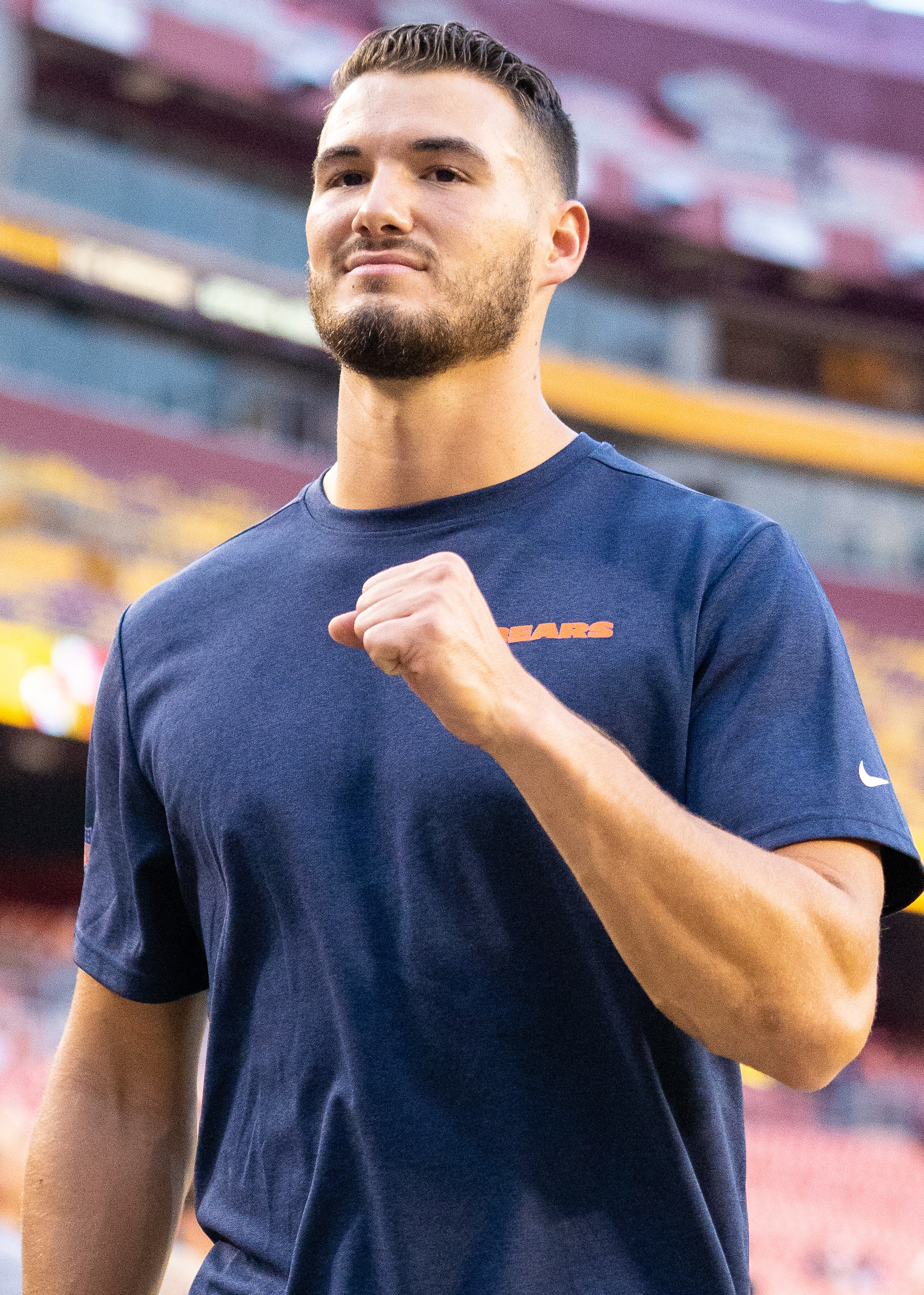
- Trubisky with the Chicago Bears in 2019

No. 10 – Tennessee Titans
- Position: Quarterback
- Roster status: Active

Personal information
- Born: August 20, 1994 (age 32); Mentor, Ohio, U.S.
- Listed height: 6 ft 3 in (1.91 m)
- Listed weight: 222 lb (101 kg)

Career information
- High school: Mentor
- College: North Carolina (2013–2016)
- NFL draft: 2017: 1st round, 2nd overall pick

Career history
- Chicago Bears (2017–2020); Buffalo Bills (2021); Pittsburgh Steelers (2022–2023); Buffalo Bills (2024–2025); Tennessee Titans (2026–present)

Awards and highlights
- Pro Bowl (2018); Third-team All-ACC (2016)

Career NFL statistics as of 2025
- Passing attempts: 1,933
- Passing completions: 1,244
- Completion percentage: 64.4%
- TD–INT: 78–48
- Passing yards: 13,028
- Passer rating: 86.9
- Stats at Pro Football Reference

Mitchell David Trubisky (/truːˈbɪski/ troo-BISS-kee; born August 20, 1994) is an American professional football quarterback for the Tennessee Titans of the National Football League (NFL). He played college football for the North Carolina Tar Heels, receiving third-team All-ACC honors in 2016. Trubisky was selected second overall by the Chicago Bears in the 2017 NFL draft.

As the Bears' starting quarterback for four seasons, Trubisky's most successful year was in 2018 when he led the team to their first division title since 2010, earning him Pro Bowl honors. He also helped Chicago make the playoffs a second time in 2020. Due to inconsistent play, he was not re-signed by the Bears when his rookie contract expired the following year. After one year as a backup with the Buffalo Bills, Trubisky spent two seasons alternating as the starter and backup with Pittsburgh Steelers before rejoining the Bills for two more seasons as a backup. Trubisky joined the Titans as a backup in 2026.

== Early life ==
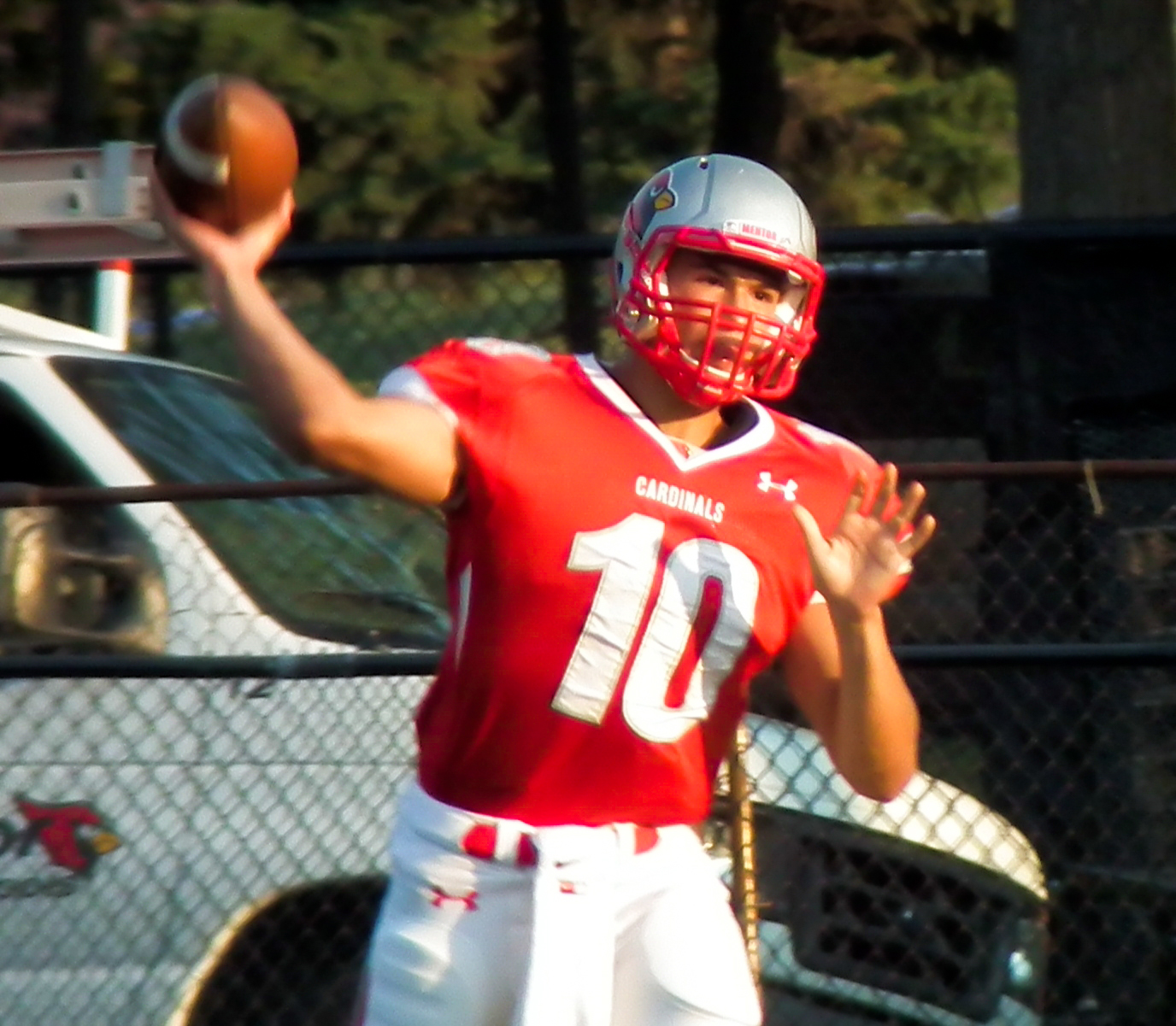
Trubisky with Mentor High School in 2012.

Trubisky was born in Mentor, Ohio, on August 20, 1994. He attended Mentor High School where he played for the Cardinals football team. During his high school football career, he passed for 9,126 yards and 92 touchdowns and rushed for 1,559 career yards and 33 touchdowns. He was the recipient of the Ohio Mr. Football Award in 2012. Trubisky committed to the University of North Carolina at Chapel Hill to play college football under head coach Larry Fedora.

== College career ==
Trubisky redshirted for his first year at North Carolina in 2013. He played in ten games as a backup to starter Marquise Williams in 2014. He made his collegiate debut in relief of Williams against the Liberty Flames in a 56–29 victory. In the game, he completed 10 pasees of 16 attempts for 66 yards with one touchdown and one interception. He threw his first career touchdown to tight end Jack Tabb in the third quarter.

Trubisky appeared in North Carolina's bowl game at the end of the season against the Rutgers Scarlet Knights. In the 2014 Quick Lane Bowl, he was 7-of-9 for 65 yards and a touchdown, which was a pass to receiver Kendrick Singleton, in the 40–21 loss to the Scarlet Knights. For his freshman season he completed 42-of-78 passes for 459 yards, five touchdowns, and four interceptions.

As a sophomore, Trubisky again served as the backup to Williams, appearing in nine games in the 2015 season. He made his season debut against the North Carolina A&T Aggies. In the game, he was 5-of-7 for 37 yards and a touchdown. In addition, he had a 35-yard rushing touchdown in the 53–14 victory. He had a career day against the Delaware Fightin' Blue Hens on September 26. He was 17-of-20 for 312 yards and four touchdowns in the 41–14 victory. He made an appearance in the ACC Championship Game against the Clemson Tigers, completing a single pass for 16 yards. For the season, he completed 40-of-47 passes for 555 yards and six touchdowns and rushed 16 times for 101 yards and three touchdowns.

As a junior, Trubisky took over as the starting quarterback in 2016. He started in all 13 games in the 2016 season. In the season-opening 33–24 loss to the Georgia Bulldogs, he was 24-of-40 for 156 yards. He added three rushes for seven yards and one touchdown. In the following week against the Illinois Fighting Illini, he had 265 passing yards and two touchdowns. In addition, he had nine rushes for 42 yards and two rushing touchdowns in the 48–23 victory. Two weeks later against the Pittsburgh Panthers, he had a career-day through the air. He was 35-of-46 for 453 yards and five touchdowns in the 37–36 victory. On November 5, against the Georgia Tech Yellow Jackets, he had his first career reception, which was for eight yards. In the 2016 Sun Bowl against the Stanford Cardinal, he was 23-of-39 for 280 yards, two touchdowns, and two interceptions in his final collegiate game, a 25–23 loss. He recorded 3,748 passing yards with 30 touchdowns and six interceptions in his junior season. As a result of his successful junior season, he was named a member of the third-team All-ACC. Trubisky decided to forgo his senior season and declared for the 2017 NFL draft on January 9, 2017, opting to give up his final year of college eligibility.

=== Statistics ===
Year	Team	Games			Passing								Rushing			
Year	Team	GP	GS	Record	Cmp	Att	Pct	Yds	Y/A	TD	Int	Rtg	Att	Yds	Avg	TD
2013	North Carolina	0	0	—	Redshirted (redshirt)											
2014	North Carolina	10	0	—	42	78	53.8	459	5.9	5	4	114.2	11	30	2.7	0
2015	North Carolina	9	0	—	40	47	85.1	555	11.8	6	0	226.4	16	101	6.3	3
2016	North Carolina	13	13	8–5	304	447	68.0	3,748	8.4	30	6	157.9	93	308	3.3	5
Career		32	13	8–5	386	572	67.5	4,762	8.3	41	10	157.6	120	439	3.7	8

== Professional career ==
=== Pre-draft ===
Coming out of college, Trubisky was projected to be a first-round pick by the majority of scouts and analysts. ESPN and Pro Football Focus (PFF) ranked Trubisky the second best quarterback, NFLDraftScout.com ranked him as the top quarterback in the draft, and Sports Illustrated ranked him the fourth best quarterback available.

External videos
- Mitchell Trubisky's NFL combine workout
- Trubisky's positional drills

Pre-draft measurables
Height	Weight	Arm length	Hand span	Wingspan	40-yard dash	10-yard split	20-yard split	20-yard shuttle	Three-cone drill	Vertical jump	Broad jump	Wonderlic
6 ft 2 1/8 in (1.88 m)	222 lb (101 kg)	32 in (0.81 m)	9 1/2 in (0.24 m)	6 ft 4 5/8 in (1.95 m)	4.67 s	1.55 s	2.71 s	4.25 s	6.87 s	27.5 in (0.70 m)	9 ft 8 in (2.95 m)	25
All values from NFL Combine

=== Chicago Bears ===
==== 2017 season ====
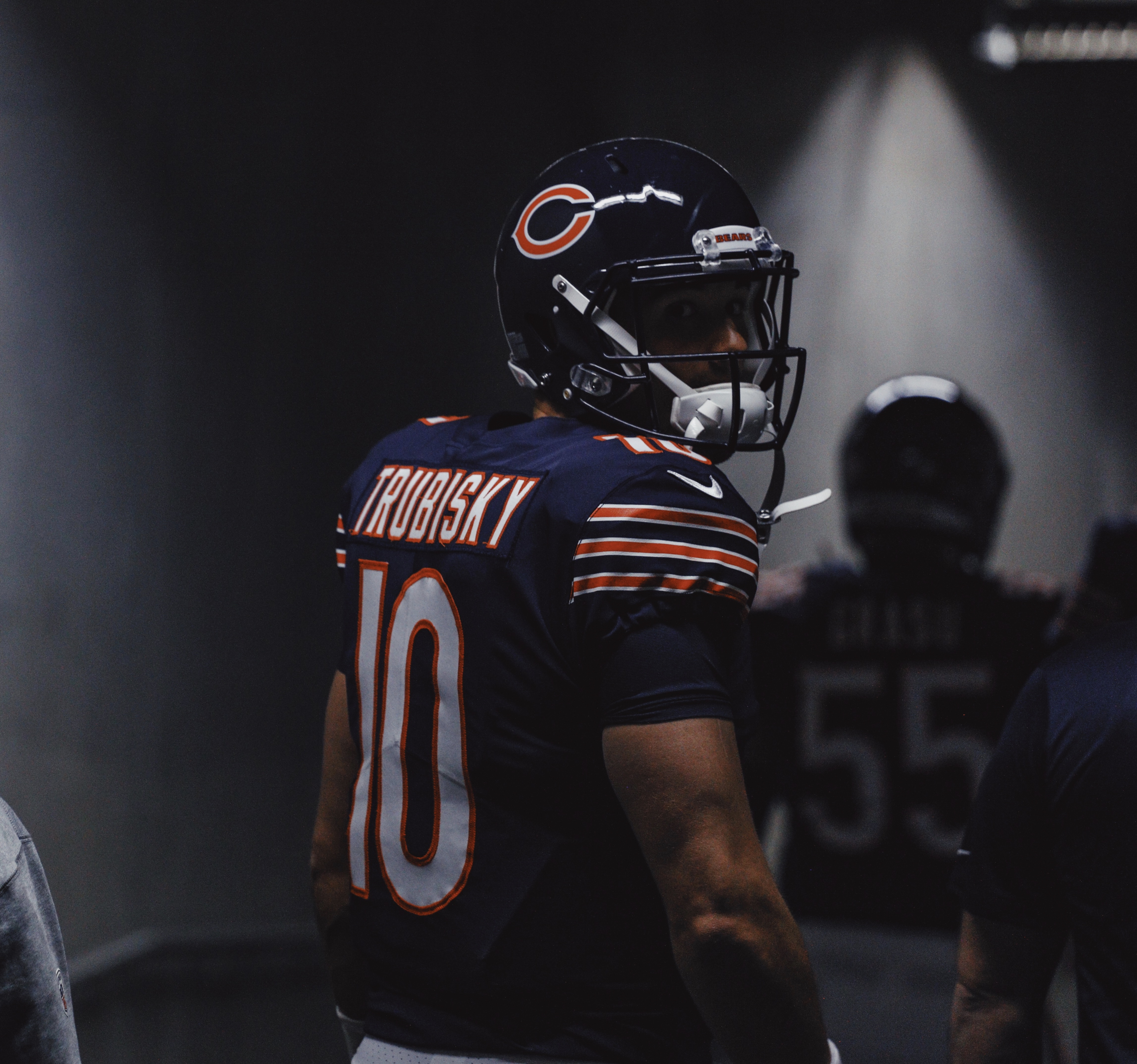
Trubisky in the tunnel before a 2017 game against the Detroit Lions

Trubisky was drafted by the Chicago Bears in the first round with the second overall pick in the 2017 NFL draft. He was the highest-selected quarterback in the draft. The Bears moved up from the third overall pick by trading the San Francisco 49ers two third-round picks and a fourth-round pick.

External videos
- Bears select Trubisky second overall
- Trubisky Draft All Access video

During the 2017 preseason, Trubisky recorded the third-highest passer rating of the 29 quarterbacks with at least 50 passes with 106.2, along with three touchdowns and no interceptions. Despite his strong preseason, he was named the backup to Mike Glennon for the 2017 regular season.

After the Bears started the season with a 1–3 record, head coach John Fox benched Glennon and Trubisky was named the starter for Week 5. Trubisky made his first regular season start on October 9, 2017, against the Minnesota Vikings, where he completed 12-of-25 passes for 128 yards, a touchdown, and an interception, as the Bears lost 20–17 on Monday Night Football. His first career touchdown was a 20-yard pass to tight end Zach Miller. In his next start, he completed 8-of-16 passes, including a touchdown and a critical completion in overtime that set up a game-winning field goal in a 27–24 win over the Baltimore Ravens. During Week 7 against the Carolina Panthers, Trubisky was limited to 107 passing yards, but with the defense forcing three turnovers and two defensive touchdowns, the Bears won by a score of 17–3.

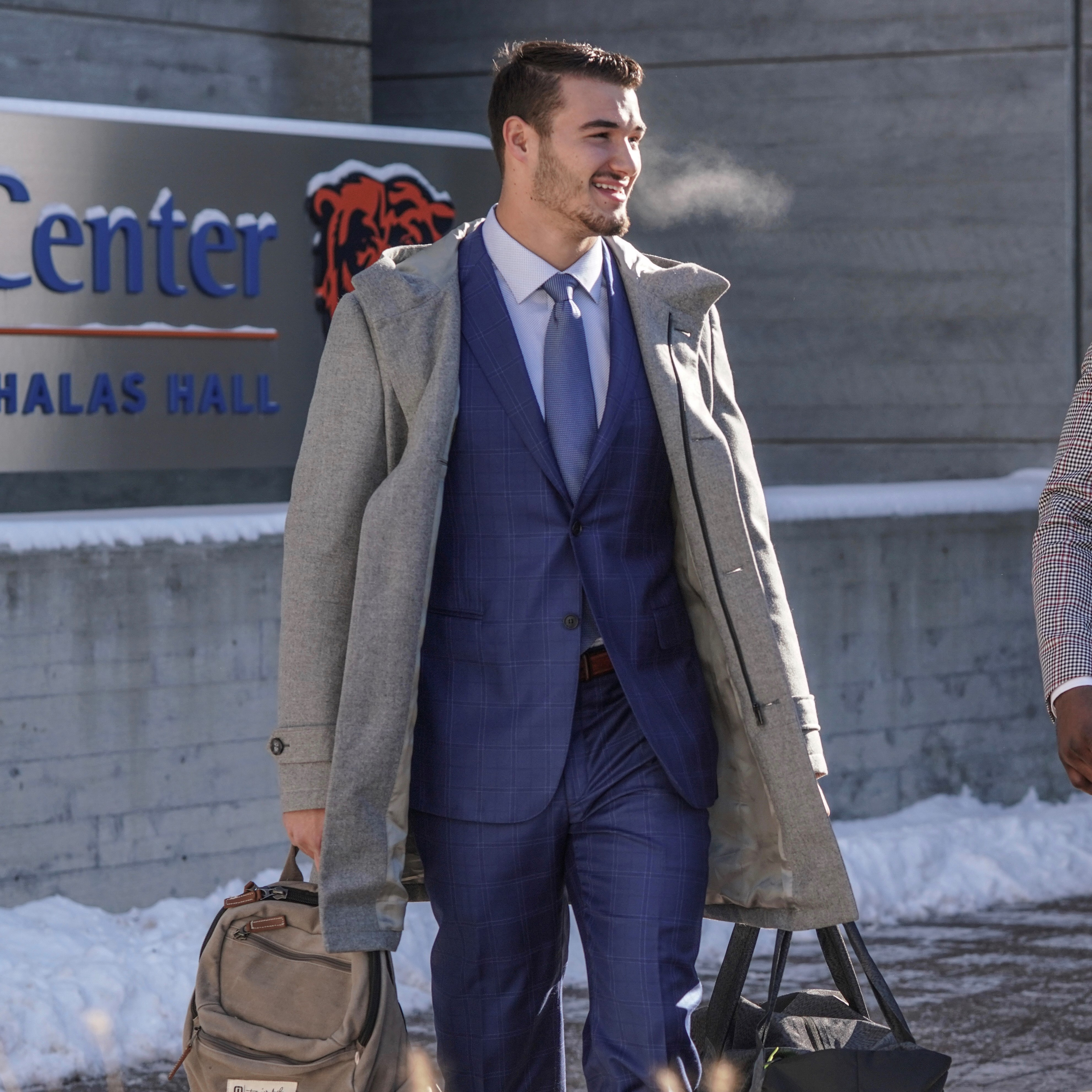
Trubisky in 2017

In Week 12, Trubisky completed 17 for 33 passes for 147 yards and two interceptions en route to a 31–3 loss against the Philadelphia Eagles. The following week, Trubisky completed 12-of-15 passes for 102 yards and a touchdown against the 49ers, but a late field goal by Robbie Gould lifted the 49ers to a 15–14 victory. During Week 14, however, he completed 25-of-32 passes for 271 yards and a touchdown to seal a 33–7 blowout win over the Cincinnati Bengals, snapping a five-game losing streak as well as posting a 112.4 passer rating. In Week 15, he struggled against the Detroit Lions; despite finishing with 314 passing yards and a touchdown, he also threw three interceptions as the Bears lost 20–10. In the next game, a 20–3 victory over the Cleveland Browns, Trubisky threw for 193 yards; increasing his season passing yard total to 2,015, the most by a rookie in Bears history. In the regular season finale, a 23–10 loss to the Minnesota Vikings, he had 178 passing yards and no interceptions.

Trubisky ended his rookie season with a 4–8 record in 12 starts, seven touchdown passes, and seven interceptions. He also ran for 248 yards, the most by a Bears quarterback since Kordell Stewart in 2003.

==== 2018 season ====
Fox was fired after the 2017 season and was replaced by Kansas City Chiefs offensive coordinator Matt Nagy, who expressed an interest in working with Trubisky after the two met prior to the 2017 draft. General manager Ryan Pace made it an off-season priority to build the Bears' offense around Trubisky, the team signed wide receivers Allen Robinson and Taylor Gabriel and tight end Trey Burton over the 2018 off-season. Despite Trubisky having a slow start to the 2018 regular season in which he threw just two touchdown passes in the first three games, the Bears managed a 2–1 start through the first three weeks.

Success came in week 4 against the Tampa Bay Buccaneers: he completed 19-of-26 passes for 354 yards, threw for six touchdowns (five in the first half), and got a passer rating of 154.7. Chicago won by a score of 48–10; the six touchdowns were one short of the Bears franchise record set by Sid Luckman in 1943. Trubisky became the first Bears quarterback to throw five touchdowns in a half since Johnny Lujack in 1949, and he was the second player in NFL history to have five different players catch a touchdown pass in a game since Aaron Rodgers of the Green Bay Packers against the Bears. He was named the FedEx Air Player of the Week for his performance.

After a Week 5 bye, in Week 6 against the Miami Dolphins, Trubisky threw for 316 yards, three touchdowns, and one interception in the 31–28 overtime loss. In Week 7, in a loss to the New England Patriots that saw his potential game-tying Hail Mary pass to Kevin White be caught one yard short of the end zone, Trubisky threw for 333 yards, two touchdowns, and two interceptions, while also rushing for 81 yards and a touchdown. On the touchdown run, from the Patriots' eight-yard line, he faced pressure that forced him to retreat horizontally across the field before running forward for the score; while it is officially an eight-yard touchdown run, he ran a distance of 71.91 yards on the play. The following week, he hit Tarik Cohen for a 70-yard touchdown in the first quarter, ending the day with 220 yards in the win over the New York Jets. In Week 9, against the Buffalo Bills, his output was low but the Bears victory was assisted with four takeaways and two defensive touchdowns. In Week 10 against the Lions, Trubisky threw for 355 yards and three touchdowns, and rushed for 18 yards and a touchdown, in their 34–22 victory against the division rival. His performance again earned him NFC Offensive Player of the Week.

In a victory over the Vikings during Week 11, Trubisky threw a touchdown and two interceptions for 165 yards, but suffered a shoulder injury delivered by Vikings' safety Harrison Smith on a late hit, which caused him to miss the Bears' next two games. Trubisky made his return in Week 14 against the Los Angeles Rams and threw for 110 yards, one touchdown, and three interceptions. His touchdown pass was a two-yard pass to offensive lineman Bradley Sowell. Despite his struggles, the Bears defense made four interceptions off Rams quarterback Jared Goff and won by a score of 15–6. In Week 15, Trubisky threw for 235 yards and two touchdowns in a 24–17 win over the Packers. The win also clinched the NFC North division for the Bears for the first time since 2010.

In December, Trubisky was named an alternate to the 2019 Pro Bowl. During the Week 16 win over the 49ers, Trubisky completed 25 of 29 passes for 246 yards and a touchdown for a completion percentage of 86.2, the highest by a Bears quarterback with at least 20 passes since 1950. He also became the sixth quarterback in Bears history to record 3,000 passing yards in a season. After 163 yards in the season finale victory over the Vikings, he ended the regular season with 3,223 passing yards, 24 touchdowns, and 12 interceptions; he also rushed for 421 yards (fifth among quarterbacks) and three touchdowns. He tied the team record for most 300-passing-yard games in a season with four, while also setting a franchise-high of games with a passer rating higher than 120 as he had four. He received an overall grade of 63.6 from PFF in 2018, which ranked as the 33rd highest grade among all qualifying quarterbacks.

In the Wild Card Round against the Eagles, Trubisky rebounded from nearly throwing two interceptions in the second quarter to completing 13 of 20 passes for 198 yards and a touchdown to Robinson in the second half. On the Bears' final drive of the game, with 48 seconds remaining and his team trailing 16–15, Trubisky led a 33-yard drive that featured a 25-yard pass to Robinson. However, Cody Parkey's potential 43-yard game-winning field goal failed – off the post and then crossbar – and resulted in a Chicago defeat. Trubisky ended his playoff debut having completed 26 of 43 passes for 303 yards, one touchdown, and a passer rating of 89.6; the yards and completions set franchise postseason records, while Trubisky became the youngest Bears quarterback to throw a touchdown pass in the playoffs since Doug Flutie in 1986.

Following the season, Trubisky was named an alternate to the 2019 Pro Bowl. He became the first Bears quarterback since Jim McMahon in 1986 to be named to the Pro Bowl.

==== 2019 season ====
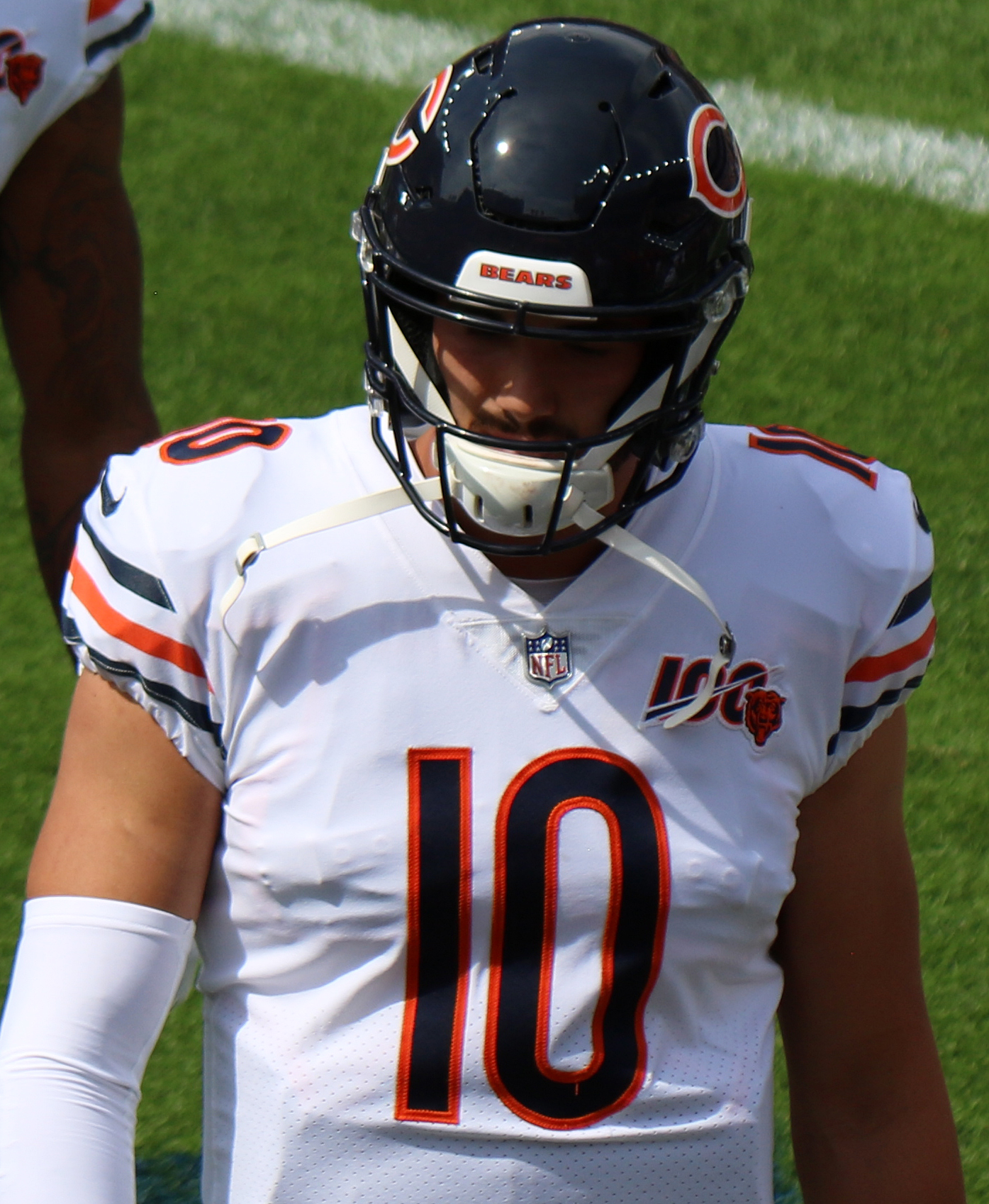
Trubisky in Denver in 2019

In Week 1 against the Packers, Trubisky threw for 228 yards for zero touchdowns and one interception. He finished the game completing 26 out of 45 pass attempts with a quarterback rating of 62.1 as the Bears lost 10–3. The following week against the Denver Broncos, Trubisky threw 16 times for 120 yards, including a 25-yard completion on fourth down to wide receiver Allen Robinson with only eight seconds in the game that set up a 53-yard game-winning field goal by kicker Eddy Piñeiro. In Week 3 against the Washington Redskins, Trubisky recorded his first touchdown pass of the year on a three-yard throw to Taylor Gabriel; the pair recorded two more touchdowns during the second quarter. Trubisky ended the 31–15 Bears victory with 231 passing yards, three touchdowns, and one interception as the Bears won 31–15. In Week 4 against the Vikings, Trubisky injured his shoulder after being tackled by Danielle Hunter in the first quarter. He was relieved by Chase Daniel who led the Bears to a 16–6 win. On October 20, the Bears ruled Trubisky active ahead of their game against the New Orleans Saints. In the game, Trubisky threw for 251 yards and two touchdowns in the 36–25 loss.

In Week 9 against the Eagles, Trubisky threw for 125 yards in the 22–14 loss. The Bears' offense generated nine total yards in the first half as the team suffered their fourth consecutive loss, which led to continued talk about Trubisky's hold on the Bears' quarterback position both in the short and long term. In Week 10 against the Lions, Trubisky threw for 173 yards and three touchdowns in the 20–13 win. In Week 11 against the Rams on Sunday Night Football, Trubisky threw for 190 yards, one touchdown, and one interception. He suffered a hip pointer while being sacked by Michael Brockers and was benched late in the fourth quarter for Daniel in the 17–7 loss.

Trubisky played his first Thanksgiving career game in Week 13 against the Lions; in the game, he threw for 338 yards, three touchdowns including the game-winning score, and an interception in the 24–20 win. He was subsequently named FedEx Air Player of the Week. The following week against Dallas Cowboys, Trubisky rebounded from throwing an opening-drive interception at the Cowboys' one-yard line by recording 244 passing yards, three touchdown passes, and 63 rushing yards, including a 23-yard rushing touchdown on a read option play as the Bears won 31–24. In Week 15, against the Green Bay Packers, he passed for 334 yards, one touchdown, and two interceptions in the 21–13 loss. This loss, coupled with a Vikings' victory over the Los Angeles Chargers, eliminated the Bears from playoff contention. Overall, in the 2019 season, Trubisky recorded 3,138 passing yards, 17 passing touchdowns, and ten interceptions to go along with 48 carries for 193 rushing yards and two rushing touchdowns.

==== 2020 season ====
On March 31, 2020, the Bears traded for Jacksonville Jaguars quarterback Nick Foles and announced an "open competition" for starting quarterback between Trubisky and Foles. On May 2, the Bears declined Trubisky's fifth-year option. Trubisky and Foles battled for the starting position during the offseason, and Nagy named Trubisky the starter prior to the 2020 season opener.

In the season opener against the Lions, Trubisky started off slow as he completed eight passes on 20 attempts for 110 yards in the first half, while the Bears trailed 23–6 entering the fourth quarter. During the final period, he saw marked improvement with eight of ten passes completed for 89 yards and three touchdowns, scoring 21 unanswered points as the Bears came back for the 27–23 victory. Trubisky attributed the late-game success to the Lions' switch to man-to-man defense, explaining in his press conference that "when [the Lions] got down to the wire, they're going to play what they trust most and that's man for them. And we knew that."

The following week against the New York Giants, Trubisky completed 13 of 18 passes for 159 yards and a pair of touchdowns in the first half as the Bears pulled ahead 17–0. However, he had just five of ten completions for 31 yards and two interceptions in the second, with the Giants nearly coming back before Chicago held on for the 17–13 victory.

The Bears benched Trubisky during the Week 3 game against the Atlanta Falcons after falling into a 16-point deficit. Foles replaced Trubisky and led the Bears to a 30–26 comeback victory. Trubisky completed 13 of 22 passes for 128 yards, one touchdown, and one interception prior to being benched. Foles was officially named the starter a day after the game.

Trubisky briefly saw action in Week 8 against the Saints as a Wildcat formation quarterback, recording a three-yard run on a drive that ended with a field goal. The idea to integrate Trubisky for such plays began development shortly after his benching, with Nagy explaining in his post-game conference that it was "a weapon for us to be able to use his legs, then obviously be able to throw the ball, as well. That's something that we're looking at. Every game could be a little bit different, but it's something that teams have to prepare for." However, he suffered an injury to his throwing shoulder on the play, deactivating him for the following week's game.

On November 27, the Bears announced Trubisky as the starter for their Week 12 game against the Packers on Sunday Night Football due to Foles dealing with a hip injury. During the game, he completed 26-of-46 passes for 242 yards, three touchdowns and two interceptions, while also losing a fumble that was returned for a touchdown in the 41–25 loss. Trubisky completed 26 of 34 passes for 267 yards and one touchdown in the following game against Detroit, but he lost a fumble within his team's ten-yard line with less than two minutes remaining, leading to the Lions' game-winning touchdown.

The Week 14 game against the Houston Texans was preceded by media coverage focusing on Trubisky's selection in the 2017 draft ahead of eventual Texans quarterback Deshaun Watson; an ESPN.com article published during the week was headlined, "Bears fans will watch Texans' Deshaun Watson outplay Mitchell Trubisky and wonder what could have been". Trubisky went 24 of 33 for 267 yards, three touchdowns, and a season-best 126.7 passer rating to help the Bears lead 30–7 at halftime and win 36–7. In Week 16 against the Jaguars, Trubisky threw for 265 yards, two touchdowns, and one interception and rushed for another touchdown during the 41–17 win. Overall, Trubisky appeared in ten games in the 2020 season. He finished with 2,055 passing yards, 16 touchdowns, and eight interceptions.

During the Wild Card Round of the 2020–21 NFL playoffs, Trubisky completed 19 of 29 passes for 199 yards and one touchdown as the Saints defeated the Bears 21–9. Trubisky was voted the Nickelodeon Valuable Player (NVP) during the game's Nickelodeon broadcast after a social media ballot stuffing campaign.

Trubisky accrued 10,609 passing yards, 64 touchdowns and 37 interceptions during his four seasons with the Bears. He holds the Bears franchise record for career passer rating (87.2) and career completion percentage (64%). Trubisky was generally considered a draft bust due to his inconsistent play and the Bears selecting him above two-time MVP Patrick Mahomes and three-time Pro Bowl selection Watson.

=== Buffalo Bills (first stint) ===
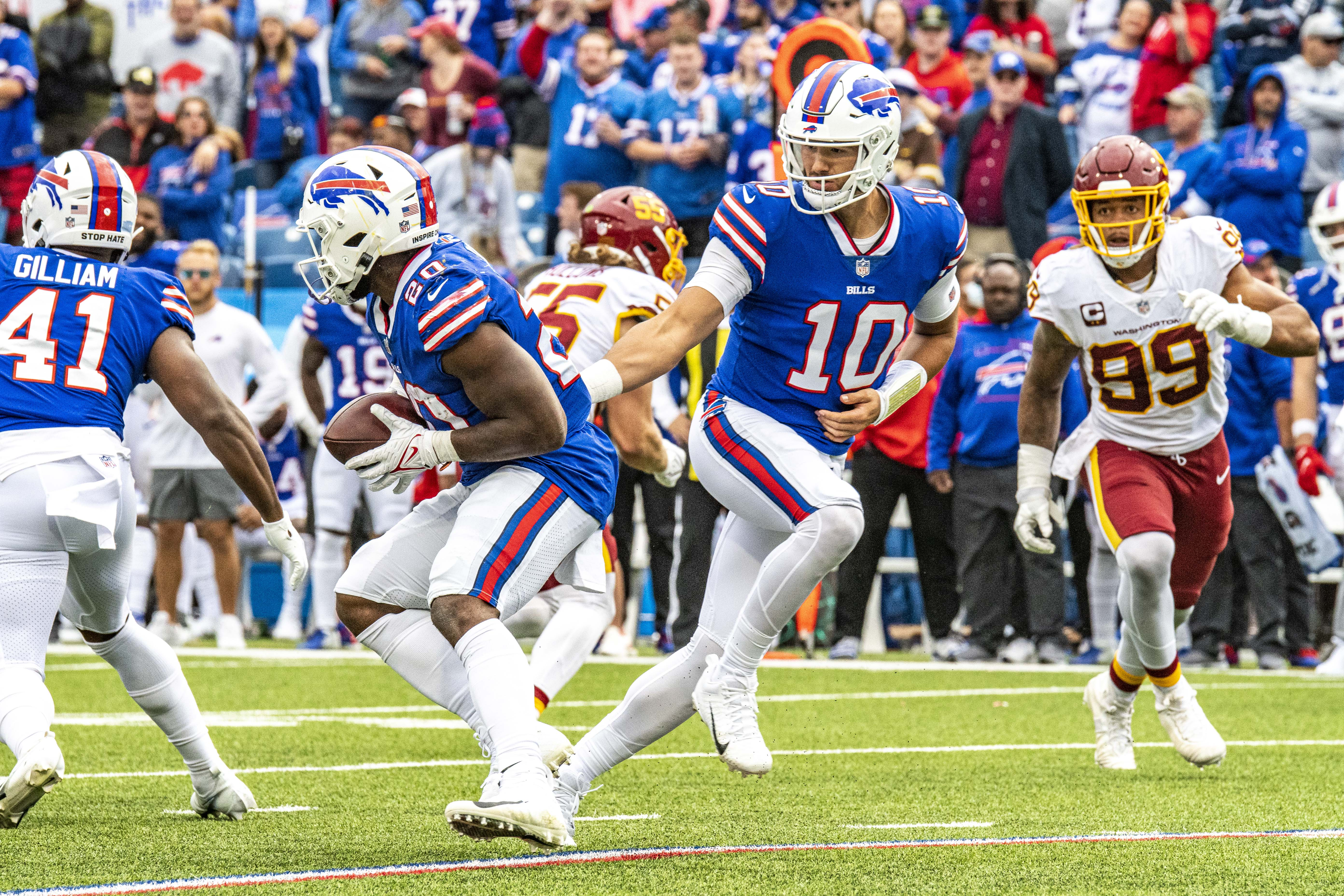
Trubisky playing against Washington in 2021

On March 18, 2021, Trubisky signed a one-year deal with the Bills worth $2.5 million. He was not offered a starting opportunity with other teams, so Trubisky said he signed with the Bills to be Josh Allen's back-up and learn under the same coaching staff that developed Allen into an MVP candidate.

Trubisky made his first appearance for the Bills late in a blowout victory over the Washington Football Team in Week 3. He made another appearance in the 4th quarter in a 40–0 victory over the Texans in Week 4, where he scored his only touchdown of the season, a four-yard run.

=== Pittsburgh Steelers ===
==== 2022 ====
On March 17, 2022, Trubisky signed a two-year contract with the Pittsburgh Steelers. On September 6, 2022, Trubisky was named the Steelers' starting quarterback over Kenny Pickett for their Week 1 game against the Bengals. In the game, Trubisky threw for 194 yards and a touchdown and committed no turnovers in the 23–20 overtime win. After throwing for 168 yards with a touchdown and an interception in the Week 2 loss at home against the Patriots, there were chants of "We want Kenny" heard among the Pittsburgh crowd. In Week 4 against the Jets, Trubisky was benched going in the third quarter for Pickett after throwing for 84 yards and an interception in the 24–20 loss. Later that week, Tomlin announced Pickett as the starting quarterback. During a Week 6 game against the Buccaneers, Trubisky came in to replace an injured Pickett. In Week 15 against the Panthers, Trubisky was named the starting quarterback after Pickett was ruled out with a concussion. He passed for 179 yards and scored a rushing touchdown in the 24–16 victory.

==== 2023 ====
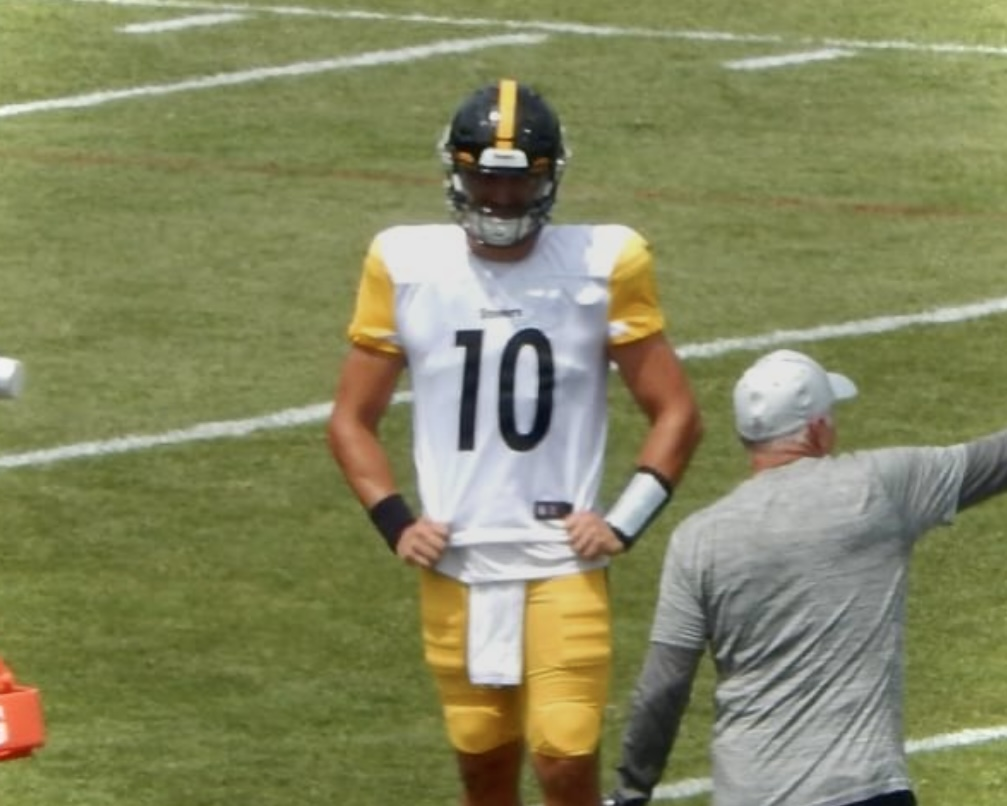
Trubisky with the Steelers in 2023.

On May 18, 2023, Trubisky signed a two-year extension with the Steelers.

In Week 13, Trubisky relieved an injured Kenny Pickett. With Pickett out, Trubisky was the starter in Weeks 14 and 15, completing 38 of 58 pass attempts for 359 yards, two touchdowns, and three interceptions as Pittsburgh lost both of his starts. Trubisky later lost the starting job in favor of Mason Rudolph. On February 12, 2024, Trubisky was released from the Steelers.

=== Buffalo Bills (second stint) ===
On March 7, 2024, Trubisky signed a two-year deal with the Bills. He appeared in nine games, with the bulk of his action coming in Week 18 against the Patriots when Josh Allen played the game's first play but rested the remainder of the game. Trubisky threw for two touchdowns on the season.

Trubisky remained Allen's backup in 2025. Like the previous year, he played much of the season finale against the Jets while Allen and the starters rested. He completed 22 of 29 passes for 259 yards and four touchdowns as the Bills won 35–8 in the final game at Highmark Stadium.

=== Tennessee Titans ===
On March 12, 2026, Trubisky signed a two-year, $10.5 million contract with the Tennessee Titans. He competed in the preseason with Will Levis and Hendon Hooker to back up starting quarterback Cam Ward. Trubisky went into the regular season as the only quarterback listed behind Ward.

== NFL career statistics ==
Legend
**Bold**	Career high

=== Regular season ===
Year	Team	Games			Passing									Rushing					Sacked		Fumbles	
Year	Team	GP	GS	Record	Cmp	Att	Pct	Yds	Y/A	Lng	TD	Int	Rtg	Att	Yds	Y/A	Lng	TD	Sck	SckY	Fum	Lost
2017	CHI	12	12	4–8	196	330	59.4	2,193	6.6	**70**	7	7	77.5	41	248	6.0	**46**	2	31	196	**10**	**3**
2018	CHI	14	14	**11–3**	289	434	66.6	**3,223**	7.4	**70**	**24**	**12**	95.4	**68**	**421**	**6.2**	39	**3**	24	143	6	**3**
2019	CHI	15	15	8–7	**326**	**516**	63.2	3,138	6.1	53	17	10	83.0	48	193	4.0	23	2	**38**	**234**	5	2
2020	CHI	10	9	6–3	199	297	67.0	2,055	6.9	53	16	8	93.5	33	195	5.9	45	1	18	125	6	2
2021	BUF	6	0	—	6	8	**75.0**	43	5.4	15	0	1	47.4	13	24	1.8	22	1	0	0	0	0
2022	PIT	7	5	2–3	117	180	65.0	1,252	7.0	45	4	5	81.1	19	38	2.0	9	2	11	68	0	0
2023	PIT	5	2	0–2	67	107	62.6	632	5.9	26	4	5	71.9	16	54	3.4	15	2	7	42	1	1
2024	BUF	9	0	—	19	26	73.1	179	6.9	69	2	0	117.3	17	1	0.1	8	0	0	0	1	0
2025	BUF	4	0	—	25	35	71.4	313	**8.9**	37	4	0	**137.0**	9	6	0.7	9	0	0	0	0	0
Career		82	58	31–26	1,244	1,933	64.4	13,028	6.7	70	78	48	86.9	264	1,180	4.5	46	13	129	808	29	11

=== Postseason ===
Year	Team	Games			Passing									Rushing					Sacked		Fumbles	
Year	Team	GP	GS	Record	Cmp	Att	Pct	Yds	Y/A	Lng	TD	Int	Rtg	Att	Yds	Y/A	Lng	TD	Sck	SckY	Fum	Lost
2018	CHI	1	1	0–1	**26**	**43**	60.5	**303**	**7.0**	**45**	**1**	0	89.6	**3**	9	3.0	6	0	**2**	**12**	0	0
2020	CHI	1	1	0–1	19	29	**65.5**	199	6.9	28	**1**	0	**96.8**	**3**	**10**	**3.3**	**7**	0	1	8	0	0
2021	BUF	1	0	—	0	0	—	0	—	0	0	0	—	**3**	−2	−0.7	0	0	0	0	0	0
2023	PIT	0	0	—	DNP																	
2024	BUF	1	0	—	0	0	—	0	—	0	0	0	—	**3**	−3	−1.0	−1	0	0	0	0	0
2025	BUF	0	0	—	DNP																	
Career		4	2	0–2	45	72	62.5	502	7.0	45	2	0	92.5	12	14	1.2	7	0	3	20	0	0

== Records and achievements ==
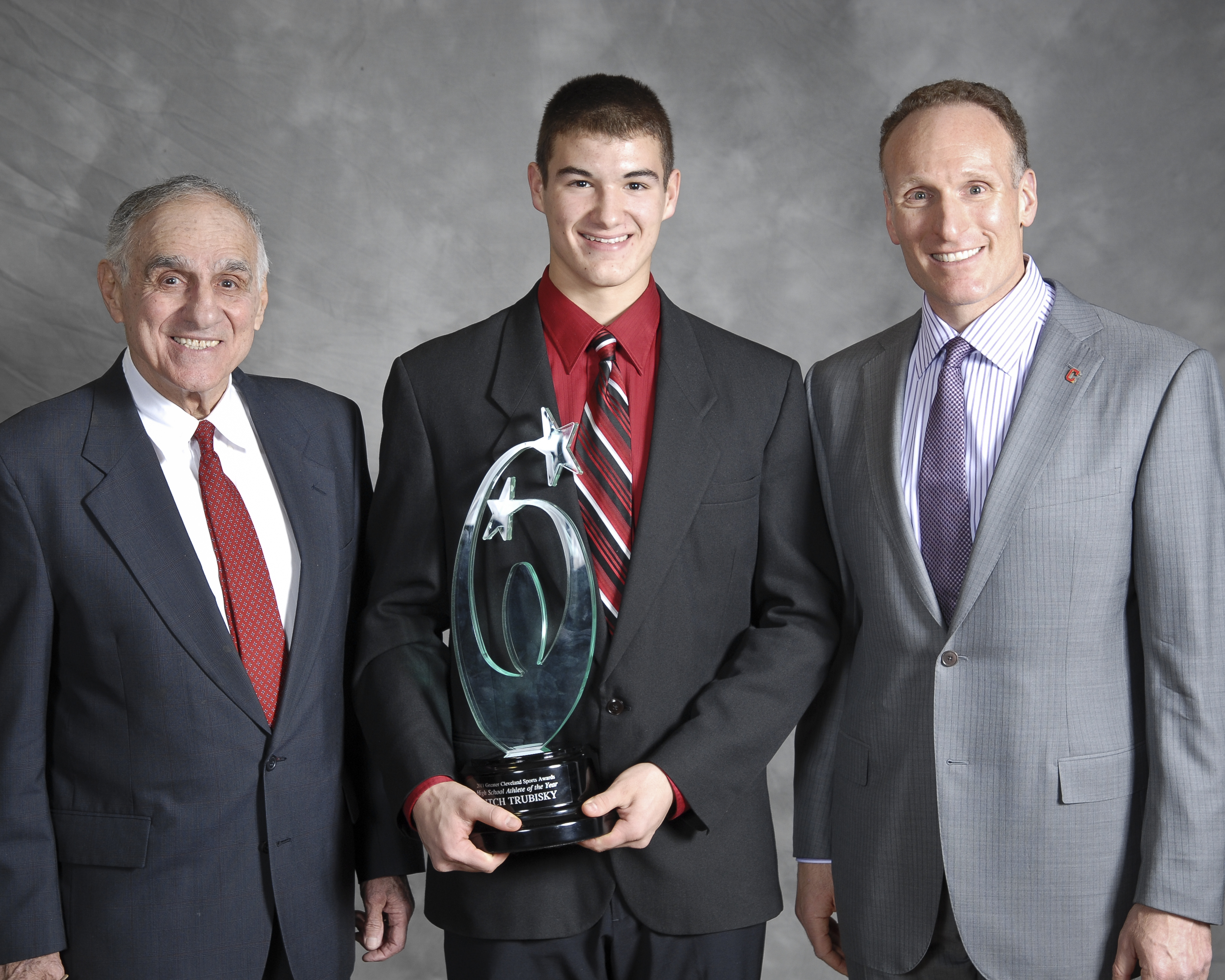
Trubisky (center) in 2012, with Sam Rutigliano (left) and Mark Shapiro, upon being named Greater Cleveland Sports Awards High School Player of the Year

=== Chicago Bears records ===
- Holds Chicago Bears postseason single-game yardage record with 303 yards (previously held by Sid Luckman)
- Fastest Bears QB to eclipse 10,000 career passing yards, 49 games (previously held by Jim McMahon)

== Personal life ==
Trubisky earned the nickname "Mr. Biscuit" in college, after one of his coaches had trouble pronouncing his name. His younger brothers Manning and Mason played wide receiver at Mentor High School, with the former going on to play at John Carroll University.

Trubisky married Hillary Gallagher on July 3, 2021. Their son was born in May 2022.
