= Treyvon Hester =

American football player (born 1992)

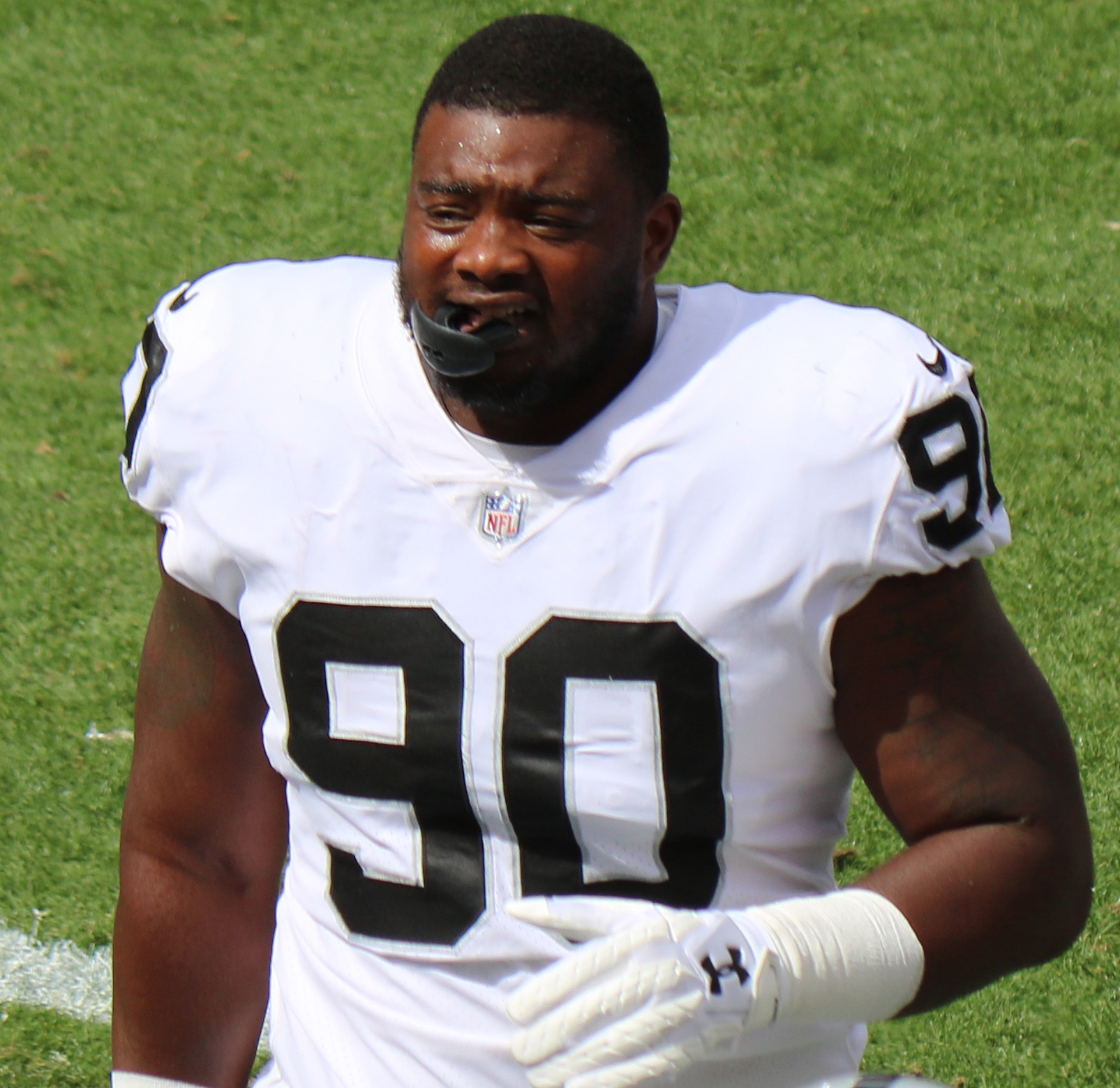
- Hester with the Oakland Raiders in 2017

No. 90, 96
- Position: Defensive tackle

Personal information
- Born: September 21, 1992 (age 34); Pittsburgh, Pennsylvania, U.S.
- Listed height: 6 ft 2 in (1.88 m)
- Listed weight: 304 lb (138 kg)

Career information
- High school: Penn Hills (Pittsburgh)
- College: Toledo (2012–2016)
- NFL draft: 2017: 7th round, 244th overall pick

Career history
- Oakland Raiders (2017); Philadelphia Eagles (2018); Washington Redskins (2019); Green Bay Packers (2020)*; Philadelphia Eagles (2020–2021)*; Buffalo Bills (2021)*; Carolina Panthers (2021)*; Seattle Sea Dragons (2023)
- * Offseason or practice squad member only

Awards and highlights
- 2× Second-team All-MAC (2014, 2016); Third-team All-MAC (2013)

Career NFL statistics
- Total tackles: 40
- Sacks: 2
- Forced fumbles: 1
- Fumble recoveries: 1
- Stats at Pro Football Reference

Treyvon Ramal Hester (born September 21, 1992) is an American former professional football player who was a defensive tackle in the National Football League (NFL). He played college football for the Toledo Rockets, and was selected in the seventh round of the 2017 NFL draft by the Oakland Raiders.

== Early life ==
Hester graduated from Penn Hills High School in Penn Hills, Pennsylvania in 2012. A 3-star defensive tackle recruit, he committed to play college football for the Toledo Rockets over offers from Kansas, Pitt, and Temple, among others.

== College ==
Hester attended University of Toledo, where he played for the Toledo team from 2012 to 2016 under coaches Matt Campbell and Jason Candle. He played in 47 games from 2013-2016, recording 161 tackles, 13 sacks, 4 pass deflections, 4 forced fumbles, and 2 fumble recoveries.

=== 2012 season ===
Hester redshirted at the University of Toledo in 2012.

=== 2013 season ===
Hester made an immediate impact in 2013. He played in all 12 games, starting nine. Totaled 39 tackles, 3.5 sacks, 7.5 tackles for loss, and one pass break up. Season-high nine tackles vs. Navy. He earned third-team All-MAC honors.

=== 2014 season ===
He made second-team All-MAC as a sophomore in 2014, totaling 45 tackles and 7.0 TFL. Season-high eight tackles vs. Northern Illinois. Six tackles vs. Cincinnati and EMU. He had 2.5 tackles for loss vs. Arkansas State in the GoDaddy Bowl. He was in on at least one tackle behind the line of scrimmage in nine games.

=== 2015 season ===
In his junior season, Hester racked up 34 tackles, 6.5 TFL, 2.5 sacks, and five QB hurries. He registered four tackles, two QB hurries and a pass breakup in bowl win over Temple. He had four tackles and one TFL in a win vs. Arkansas.

=== 2016 season ===
Hester finished off his career as a Rocket by making second-team All-MAC as a senior, totaling 39 tackles, 5.0 sacks and 8.0 TFL. Voted a team captain as a senior, Hester was on the official watch lists for the Bronko Nagurski Trophy (top defensive player) and Outland Trophy (top interior lineman)., and was invited to play in the East-West Shrine Game.

== Professional career ==
Pre-draft measurables
Height	Weight	Arm length	Hand span
6 ft 2 3/8 in (1.89 m)	300 lb (136 kg)	32 in (0.81 m)	9 3/4 in (0.25 m)
All values from the NFL Combine

=== Oakland Raiders ===
Hester was selected by the Oakland Raiders in the seventh round, 244th overall, in the 2017 NFL draft. On September 3, 2018, Hester was waived by the Raiders.

=== Philadelphia Eagles (first stint) ===
On September 7, 2018, Hester was signed to the practice squad of the Philadelphia Eagles. He was promoted to the active roster on October 2, 2018. On January 6, 2019, during a wild card game against the Chicago Bears, he tipped a potential game-winning 43-yard field goal by Cody Parkey, a play now infamously known as the Double Doink, to help the Eagles win 16–15. Hester was waived during final roster cuts on August 31, 2019.

=== Washington Redskins ===
Hester signed with the Washington Redskins on September 2, 2019.

=== Green Bay Packers ===
Hester signed with the Green Bay Packers on May 1, 2020. He was placed on the COVID-19 reserve list by the team on July 30, 2020, and was activated on August 17, 2020. He was waived/injured on September 5, 2020, and subsequently placed on injured reserve the next day. He was waived with an injury settlement on September 10.

=== Philadelphia Eagles (second stint) ===
On November 9, 2020, the Eagles signed Hester to the practice squad. He signed a reserve/future contract with the Eagles on January 4, 2021, and was released on March 9, 2021.

=== Buffalo Bills ===
On May 20, 2021, the Buffalo Bills signed Hester to a contract after a successful tryout. On August 27, 2021, he was placed on injured reserve. He was released with an injury settlement on September 8, 2021.

=== Carolina Panthers ===
On November 3, 2021, Hester was signed to the Carolina Panthers practice squad. He was released on November 16.

=== Seattle Sea Dragons ===
Hester signed with the Seattle Sea Dragons of the XFL prior to the 2023 season. Hester made the opening day roster, but was released on April 5, 2023.

== NFL career statistics ==
Regular season statistics
Season	Team	Games		Tackles				
Season	Team	GP	GS	Total	Solo	Ast	Sck	Int
2017	OAK	14	1	19	9	10	0.0	0
2018	PHI	12	1	13	8	5	1.0	0
2019	WAS	15	0	8	2	6	1.0	0
Total		41	2	40	19	21	2.0	0
Source: NFL.com

Postseason statistics
Season	Team	Games		Tackles				
Season	Team	GP	GS	Total	Solo	Ast	Sck	Int
2018	PHI	2	0	1	1	0	0.0	0
Total		2	0	1	1	0	0.0	0
Source: pro-football-reference.com
