= Chris Rumph =

American football player and coach (born 1971)

Clemson Tigers
- Title: Defensive ends coach

Personal information
- Born: December 21, 1971 (age 54); St. Matthews, South Carolina, U.S.

Career information
- High school: Calhoun County
- College: South Carolina

Career history
- South Carolina (1997) Graduate assistant; Calhoun County HS (SC) (1997–2001) Head coach; South Carolina State (2002) Defensive backs coach; Memphis (2003–2005) Outside linebackers coach; Clemson (2006–2010) Defensive ends coach; Alabama (2011–2013) Defensive line coach; Texas (2014) Assistant head coach & defensive line coach; Florida (2015–2016) Defensive line coach; Florida (2017) Co-defensive coordinator & defensive line coach; Tennessee (2018–2019) Co-defensive coordinator & outside linebackers coach; Houston Texans (2020) Outside linebackers coach; Chicago Bears (2021) Defensive line coach; Minnesota Vikings (2022–2023) Defensive line coach; Clemson (2024–present) Defensive ends coach

Awards and highlights
- 2× BCS national champion (2011, 2012)

Chris Rumph (born December 21, 1971) is an American football coach who is currently the defensive ends coach at Clemson University. He previously served as the defensive line coach for the Minnesota Vikings of the National Football League (NFL). Rumph previously coached at the collegiate level for over 15 years.

== Playing career ==
At the University of South Carolina, Rumph played on the defensive side at linebacker for South Carolina under head coaches Sparky Woods and Brad Scott.

== Coaching career ==
=== Early coaching career ===
After a spring as a graduate assistant at his college alma mater, Rumph, would go on to be the head coach at his former high school for five years, After a one-year stint with South Carolina State coaching defensive backs and three years coaching outside linebackers at Memphis, Rumph joined Clemson’s staff and remained there for five seasons.

=== Alabama ===
From there, Rumph moved to Alabama to replace Bo Davis. There, he won back-to-back BCS national championships as the team’s defensive line coach.

=== Texas ===
Rumph spent the 2014 season at Texas as the team’s assistant head coach for defense/defensive line.

=== Florida ===
Rumph joined the Gators’ staff as a defensive line coach in 2015 and was promoted to co-defensive coordinator prior to the 2017 season. He served as Florida's full-time defensive coordinator for the final four games of the season after Randy Shannon was promoted to interim head coach when Jim McElwain was fired.

=== Tennessee ===
Rumph worked as the defensive coordinator for Tennessee in 2018 and 2019.

=== Houston Texans ===
Rumph then made the jump to the NFL and worked as the team's outside linebackers coach for the 2020 season.

=== Chicago Bears ===
In 2021, Rumph became the defensive line coach for the Chicago Bears.

=== Minnesota Vikings ===
In 2022, Rumph became the defensive line coach for the Minnesota Vikings under head coach Kevin O'Connell.

=== Clemson Tigers ===
In 2024, Rumph became the defensive line coach for the Clemson Tigers.

== Personal life ==
Rumph and his wife, Kila, are parents of two sons. One son, Chris Rumph II played college football at Duke and was drafted by the Los Angeles Chargers with the 13th pick in Round 4 (118th overall) of the 2021 draft.
