= Alshon Jeffery =

American football player (born 1990)

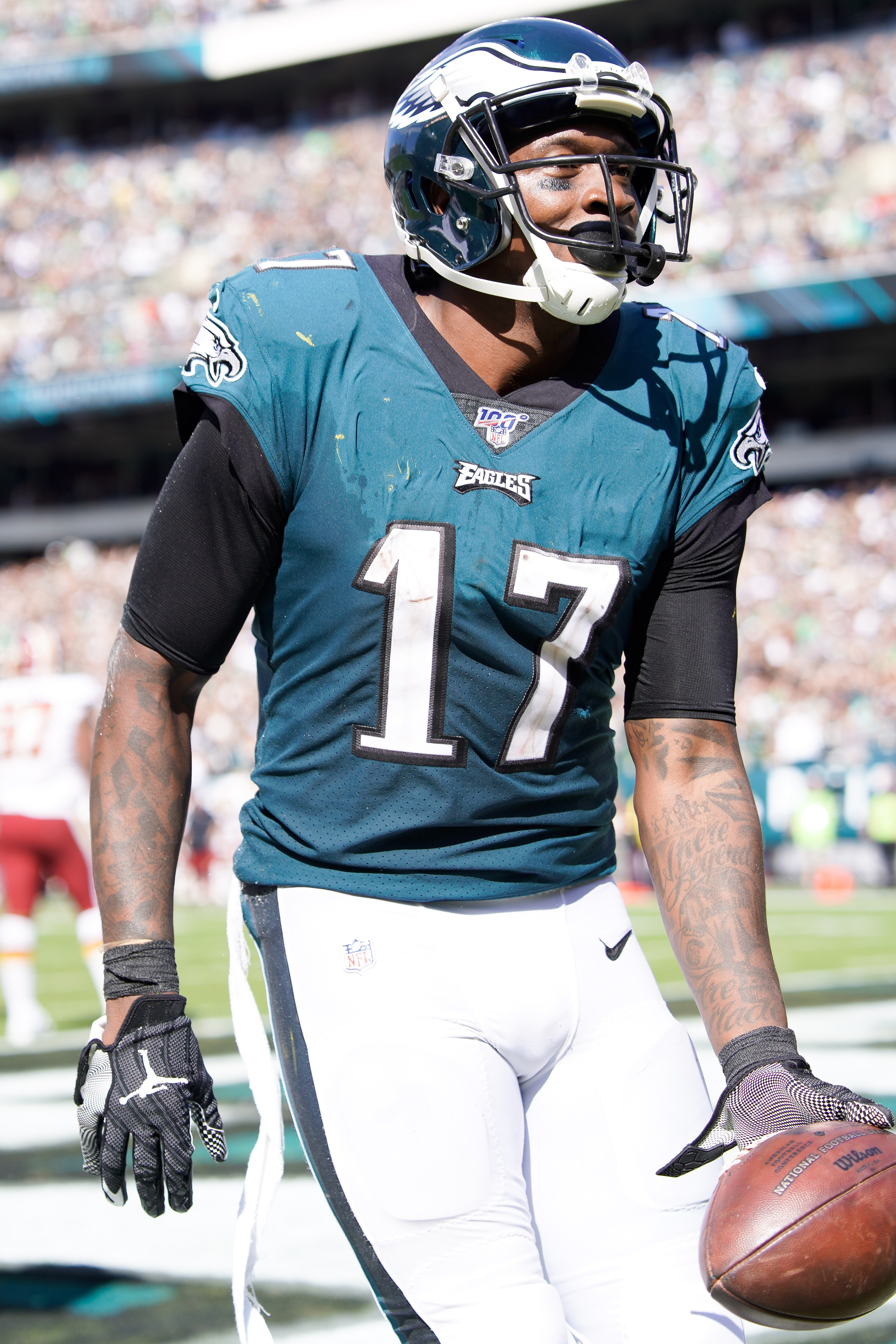
- Jeffery with the Philadelphia Eagles in 2019

No. 17
- Position: Wide receiver

Personal information
- Born: February 14, 1990 (age 36); St. Matthews, South Carolina, U.S.
- Listed height: 6 ft 3 in (1.91 m)
- Listed weight: 218 lb (99 kg)

Career information
- High school: Calhoun County (St. Matthews)
- College: South Carolina (2009–2011)
- NFL draft: 2012: 2nd round, 45th overall pick

Career history
- Chicago Bears (2012–2016); Philadelphia Eagles (2017–2020)

Awards and highlights
- Super Bowl champion (LII); Pro Bowl (2013); 100 greatest Bears of All-Time; First-team All-American (2010); First-team All-SEC (2010); Second-team All-SEC (2011); First-team Freshman All-American (2009); First-team Freshman All-SEC (2009); South Carolina Gamecocks No. 1 retired

Career NFL statistics
- Receptions: 475
- Receiving yards: 6,786
- Receiving touchdowns: 46
- Stats at Pro Football Reference

Alshon Jeffery (born February 14, 1990) is an American former professional football player who was a wide receiver in the National Football League (NFL). He played college football for the South Carolina Gamecocks, earning first-team All-American honors in 2010. Jeffery was selected by the Chicago Bears in the second round of the 2012 NFL draft. As a member of the Philadelphia Eagles, he won Super Bowl LII. South Carolina retired his number in 2023.

== Early life ==
Jeffery attended Calhoun County High School in St. Matthews, South Carolina, where he was part of a four-time state championship winning basketball team that recorded an 84–1 record. He also played two years of football and was widely recruited, giving a verbal commitment to the University of Southern California before switching his commitment to the University of South Carolina. Jeffery's younger brother, Shamier Jeffery, committed to play football for the Gamecocks in 2011, following in the footsteps of both of Jeffery's two older brothers Charles Ben and Darren Ben; both of whom also played basketball and football for Calhoun County High School.

College recruiting
Name	Hometown	School	Height	Weight	40^{‡}	Commit date
Alshon Jeffery; Wide receiver	St. Matthews, South Carolina	Calhoun County High School	6 ft 3 in (1.91 m)	N/A		
Alshon Jeffery; Wide receiver	Recruit ratings: Rivals: 247Sports:					
Overall recruit ranking: Scout: (13 WR) Rivals: 99 (12 WR) ESPN: 102 (12 WR)
‡ Refers to 40-yard dash; Note: In many cases, Scout, Rivals, 247Sports, On3, and ESPN may conflict in their listings of height, weight and 40 time.; In these cases, the average was taken. ESPN grades are on a 100-point scale.; Sources: "2009 South Carolina Football Commitment List". Rivals.; "College Football Recruiting Commits". Scout.; "Scout.com Team Recruiting Rankings". Scout.; "2009 Team Ranking". Rivals.com.

== College career ==
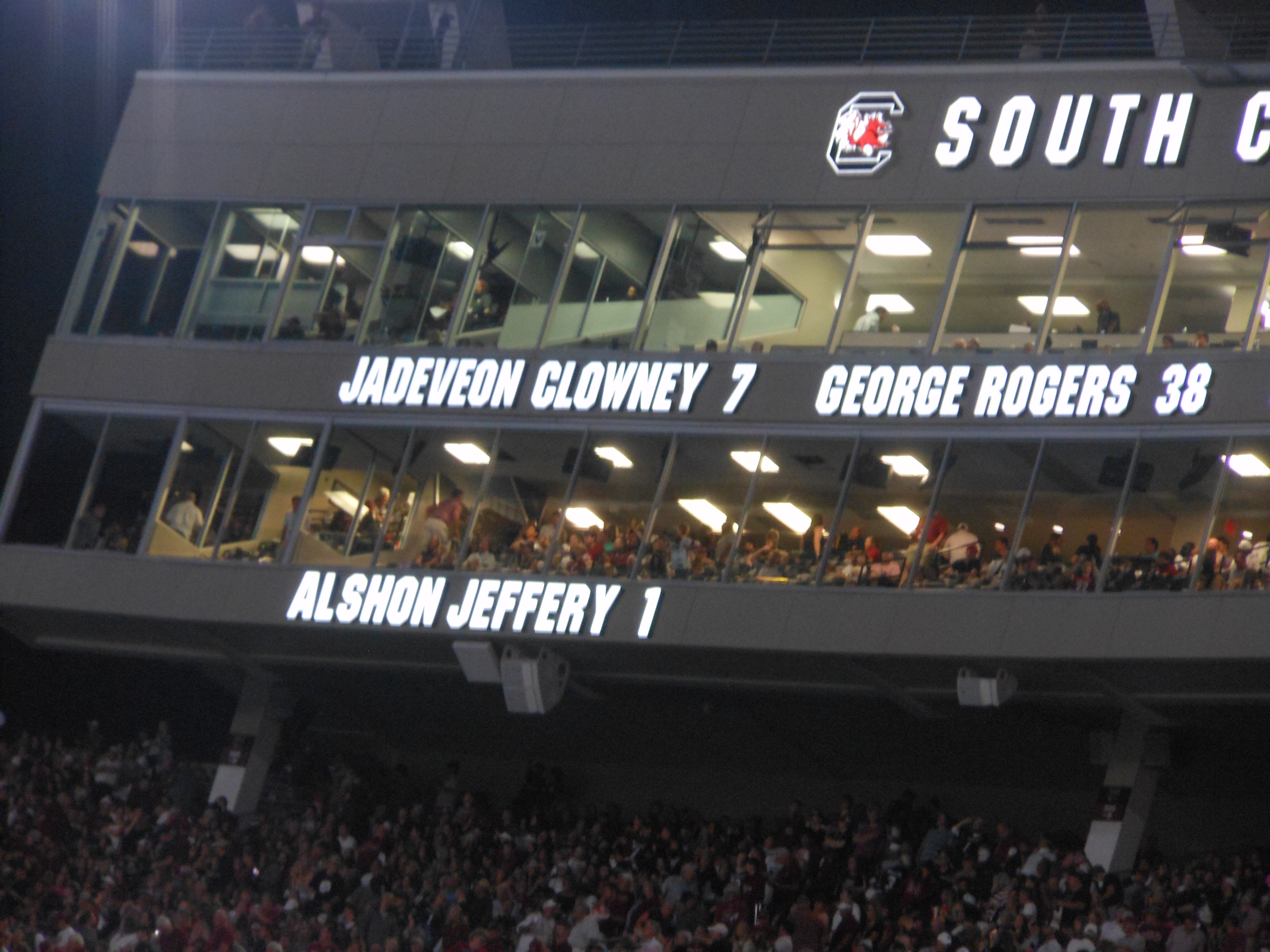
Jeffery's name being illuminated at Williams-Brice Stadium for the first time after his jersey number was retired in September 2023.

=== 2009 season ===
As a freshman, Jeffery caught five passes for 61 yards in his first five games before making seven catches for 138 yards and three touchdowns against the University of Kentucky. The performance was the second-best single-game performance in school history and Jeffery became the third Gamecock in 2009 to earn SEC Freshman of the Week, following defensive end Devin Taylor and running back Jarvis Giles. He was a consensus first-team Freshman All-SEC and first-team Freshman All-American in recognition of his successful freshman season.

=== 2010 season ===
In a Week 4 game against Auburn, Jeffery had a breakout performance in the 35–27 loss. He was only a few yards shy of 200 receiving yards and added two touchdowns for the Gamecocks. Another one of his best games in 2010 came against in-state rival Clemson where he had five catches for 141 yards and a touchdown. Through 14 games, Jeffery made 88 catches totaling 1,517 yards and nine touchdowns including eight games with 100 yards or more receiving, and a 108.4 yd/game average. Jeffery was named a Biletnikoff Award finalist, the award given to the season's outstanding receiver. Because of his performances, helping lead the Gamecocks to their first SEC Championship Game appearance in school history, Jeffery was selected as an All-American.

=== 2011 season ===
At the beginning of the 2011 season, Jeffery was named by ESPN as the best overall player in the SEC. In the season opener against ECU in which he caught five passes for 92 yards, Jeffery extended his active streak to 24 consecutive games with a reception. In the 2012 Capital One Bowl, Jeffery caught four passes for 148 yards and a touchdown but was ejected in the third quarter for fighting with Nebraska player cornerback Alfonzo Dennard. Despite this, Jeffery was named the Capital One Bowl MVP.

== Professional career ==
Pre-draft measurables
Height	Weight	Arm length	Hand span	Wingspan	40-yard dash	10-yard split	20-yard split	20-yard shuttle	Three-cone drill	Vertical jump	Broad jump
6 ft 2 7/8 in (1.90 m)	216 lb (98 kg)	33 in (0.84 m)	10 1/4 in (0.26 m)	6 ft 8 1/8 in (2.04 m)	4.48 s	1.64 s	2.63 s	4.17 s	6.71 s	36.5 in (0.93 m)	10 ft 2 in (3.10 m)
All values from NFL Combine/South Carolina's Pro Day

=== Chicago Bears ===
==== 2012 season ====
Jeffery was selected in second round of the 2012 NFL draft with the 45th overall pick by the Chicago Bears.

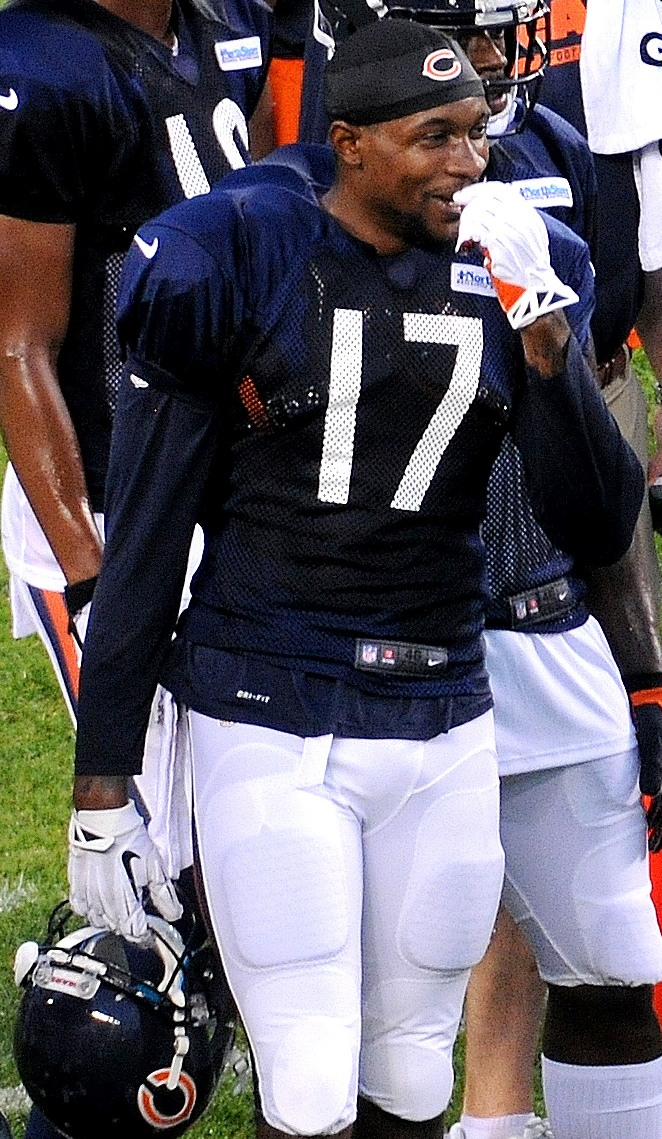
Jeffery at Bears training camp in 2014.

On May 2, Jeffery and the Bears agreed to a four-year contract, making him the first player in the 2012 draft class to sign, and the earliest second-rounder to sign since Dallas Cowboys receiver Kevin Williams in 1993. Jeffery made his debut against the Denver Broncos in week one of the preseason, and caught a game-high four passes for 35 yards, though the Bears lost 31–3. In the second preseason game, Jeffery was penalized for unnecessary roughness for fighting Washington Redskins cornerback DeAngelo Hall. Jeffery was later told by coaches to "play smarter".

In his regular season debut against the Indianapolis Colts, Jeffery caught a Jay Cutler pass for a 42-yard touchdown. In Chicago's Week 5 away game against the Jacksonville Jaguars, Jeffery left the game after catching a touchdown thrown by Cutler. Although the injury did not appear to be significant, x-rays done on the following Monday determined Jeffery broke his right hand, which led to him missing a few games. Though the injury did not require surgery, Jeffery still had to wear a cast. Jeffery eventually practiced for the first time on November 9. Jeffery returned in Week 11 against the San Francisco 49ers, but would injure his knee, and will be sidelined for 2–4 weeks. In Week 15 against the Green Bay Packers, Jeffery was penalized three times for pass interference, nullifying a touchdown and two receptions of 36 and seven yards, as the Bears lost 21–13. Jeffery ended his rookie season catching 24 passes for 367 yards and three touchdowns.

==== 2013 season ====
In 2013's Week 4 loss to the Detroit Lions, Jeffery recorded his first career 100-yard receiving game. The following week against the New Orleans Saints, Jeffery broke the Bears single-game receiving yards record with 218 yards, along with recording a career-high 10 receptions. Jeffery broke the record on the final play of the game, a 21-yard pass from Jay Cutler, passing Harlon Hill's record set in 1952 against the 49ers. In Week 13 against the Minnesota Vikings, Jeffery became the first player in franchise history to record two 200-yard games in the same season. In that game, he surpassed his own franchise record mark set earlier in the season. Jeffery ended the 2013 season with 89 receptions for 1,421 yards and seven touchdowns. The 1,421 yards are the second-most in team history, behind Brandon Marshall's 1,508 in 2012. His 89 receptions are the sixth-highest in franchise history. After an injury to Lions receiver Calvin Johnson, Jeffery was named to the 2014 Pro Bowl. On January 17, 2014, Jeffery was named the Pro Football Writers Association's Most Improved Player. He was ranked 54th by his fellow players on the NFL Top 100 Players of 2014.

==== 2014 season ====
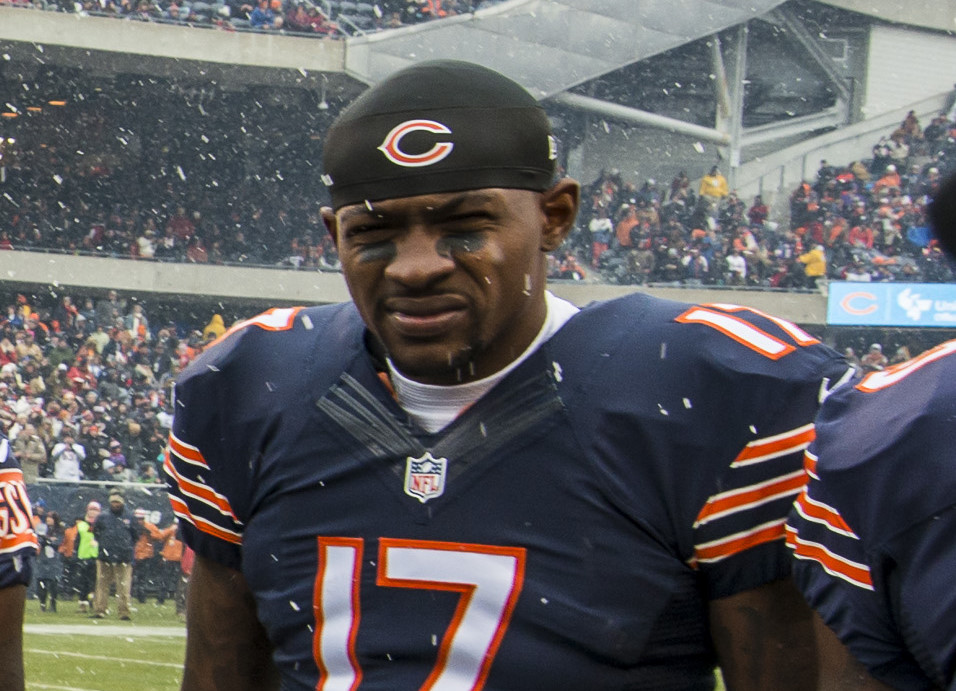
Jeffery at a Bears game in 2014.

On September 7, Jeffery caught five passes for 71 yards in the season opener against the Buffalo Bills. Jeffery recorded a 44-yard reception. On September 22, Jeffery caught eight passes for 105 yards against the New York Jets. On September 28, Jeffery caught his first touchdown of the season against the Green Bay Packers. On October 5, Jeffery caught six passes for 97 yards and a touchdown against the Carolina Panthers. On October 12, Jeffery caught five passes for a season-high 136 yards against the Atlanta Falcons. On October 26, Jeffery caught his third touchdown of the season against the New England Patriots. On November 16, Jeffery caught a season-high eleven passes for 135 yards against the Minnesota Vikings. On November 27, Jeffery caught nine passes for 71 yards and a season-high two touchdowns against the Detroit Lions. On December 4, Jeffery caught six passes for 95 yards and a touchdown against the Dallas Cowboys. On December 15, Jeffery caught his ninth touchdown of the season against the New Orleans Saints. On December 21, Jeffery caught six passes for 72 yards and a touchdown against the Detroit Lions. Jeffery caught a 20-yard touchdown.

In Jeffery's third season in the NFL, he recorded over 1,000 yards for the second time in his career with 1,133 yards with 85 receptions for 10 touchdowns on 145 targets.

==== 2015 season ====
On September 13, Jeffery caught five passes for 78 yards in the season opener against the Green Bay Packers. On October 18, Jeffery caught eight passes for 147 yards and a touchdown against the Detroit Lions. On November 1, Jeffery caught a season-high ten passes for 116 yards and a touchdown against the Minnesota Vikings. On November 9, Jeffery caught ten passes for a season-high 151 yards against the San Diego Chargers. On November 26, Jeffery caught seven passes for 90 yards against the Green Bay Packers. On December 13, Jeffery caught six passes for 107 yards against the Washington Redskins. On December 20, Jeffery recorded a 10-yard touchdown reception against the Minnesota Vikings. On December 30, Jeffery was placed on injured reserve with a hamstring injury, ending his season.

Jeffery's season ended with 54 receptions for 807 yards and four touchdowns on 93 targets. Jeffery would end up leading the Bears in receptions in the 2015 season with 54.

==== 2016 season ====
On February 26, 2016, it was announced that the Bears placed the franchise tag on Jeffery. On September 11, Jeffery caught four passes for a season-high 105 yards in the season opener against the Houston Texans. On September 19, Jeffery caught five passes for 96 yards against the Philadelphia Eagles. On October 16, Jeffery caught a season-high seven passes for 93 yards against the Jacksonville Jaguars. On October 31, Jeffery caught four passes for 63 yards and his first touchdown of the season against the Minnesota Vikings. On November 14, the NFL suspended Jeffery for four games for violating the NFL's performance-enhancing drug policy. On December 18, Jeffery caught six passes for 89 yards and a touchdown against the Green Bay Packers.

Jeffery amassed 4,549 receiving yards and 304 receptions during his five-year career with the Bears. He possesses the third most receiving yards in Bears franchise history.

=== Philadelphia Eagles ===
==== 2017 season ====
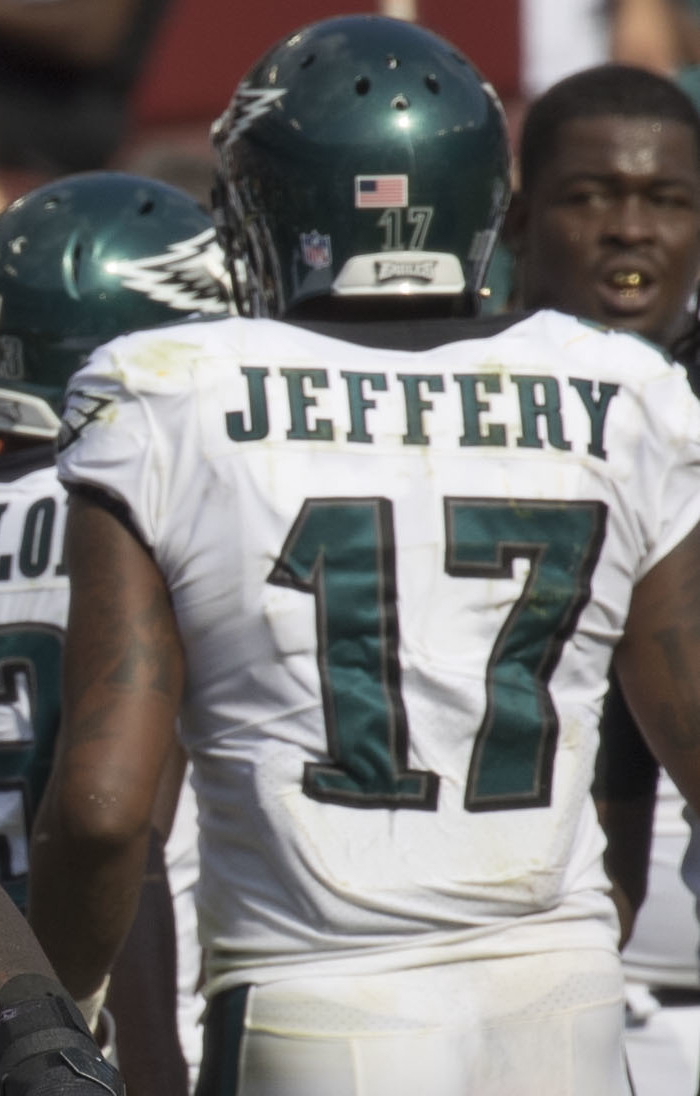
Jeffery at an Eagles game in 2017.

On March 9, 2017, Jeffery signed a one-year, $14 million contract with the Philadelphia Eagles. Jeffery made his Eagles debut on September 10, 2017, in the season opener against the Washington Redskins. He finished the game with 38 yards on three catches. In Week 2 on September 17 at Kansas City, Jeffery had 92 yards on 7 catches and one touchdown, his first as an Eagle, in a 27–20 loss to the Chiefs. On December 2, 2017, Jeffery signed a four-year extension worth $52 million with $27 million guaranteed.

The Eagles finished the season 13–3 and earned a first round bye. In the Divisional Round against the Atlanta Falcons, Jeffery recorded 4 catches for 61 yards in a 15–10 victory. In the NFC Championship against the Minnesota Vikings, Jeffery caught five passes for 85 yards and two touchdowns in 38–7 victory to advance to Super Bowl LII. In the Super Bowl, Jeffery caught 3 passes for 73 yards and scored the first touchdown of the game. The Eagles went on to defeat the New England Patriots 41–33 to give Jeffery and the franchise its first Super Bowl championship. On February 21, 2018, it was revealed that Jeffery underwent surgery for a torn rotator cuff.

==== 2018 season ====
Jeffery underwent rotator cuff surgery in the offseason. He was kept out of action going into the regular season. In Week 4 of the 2018 season, Jeffery returned from his injury and recorded eight receptions for 105 receiving yards and a touchdown against the Tennessee Titans. In Week 6, against the New York Giants, he had eight receptions for 74 receiving yards and two touchdowns. The Eagles ended up making the 2018–19 NFL playoffs with a 9–7 record. In the Wild Card round, Jeffery made six receptions for 82 receiving yards against his former team, the Chicago Bears. The Eagles won 16–15. In the Divisional Round matchup against the New Orleans Saints, Jeffery had 5 catches for 63 yards. As the Eagles were on a successful drive late in the 4th quarter, a wide open Jeffery dropped a pass from Nick Foles that fell into the hands of Saints' cornerback Marshon Lattimore. After the interception, Jeffery and the Eagles' offense never got the ball back as the Saints won 20–14. In the postgame interview, Jeffery stated that "It sucks right now. Everyone in the locker room, we're all down. Like I said, I let my teammates down, I let the city of Philadelphia down. That's on me. We'll be back next year for sure. One play don't define me, it happens. It's part of football. I just hated the way it happened in the playoffs, and it was the final moment."

==== 2019 season ====
In Week 1 against the Washington Redskins, Jeffery caught five passes for 49 yards and the first receiving touchdown of the season as the Eagles won 32–27. In Week 2 against the Atlanta Falcons, Jeffery left early in the game due to a calf injury. He was listed as questionable to return to the game, but he did not play for the remainder of the game The Eagles lost their first game of the season 20–24. Jeffery made his return from injury in Week 4 against the Green Bay Packers. In the game, he caught three passes for 38 yards and one touchdown in the 34–27 win. Jeffery suffered a hip injury in Week 9 against the Chicago Bears and was forced to miss the next two games. He made his return in Week 13 against the Miami Dolphins. In the game, Jeffery caught nine passes for 137 yards and a touchdown in the 37–31 loss. He was placed on the injured reserve list with a foot injury on December 12, 2019. Overall, Jeffery finished the 2019 season with 43 receptions for 490 receiving yards and four receiving touchdowns.

==== 2020 season ====
On July 28, 2020, the Eagles placed Jeffery on the active/physically unable to perform list to begin training camp. He was activated on September 5. Jeffery made his season debut against the New York Giants in week 10. He was targeted once with no catches. He recorded his first reception as an Eagle in Week 12 from Jalen Hurts against the Seattle Seahawks. Jeffery had his only touchdown of the season against the New Orleans Saints in Week 14. He played in seven games in the 2020 season, recording six receptions for 115 yards and one touchdown.

Jeffery was released by the Eagles on March 17, 2021.

== Career statistics ==
=== NFL ===
Legend
	Won the Super Bowl
**Bold**	Career high

Regular season statistics
Year	Team	Games		Receiving					Rushing					Fumbles	
Year	Team	GP	GS	Rec	Yds	Avg	Lng	TD	Att	Yds	Avg	Lng	TD	Fum	Lost
2012	CHI	10	6	24	367	15.3	55	3	—	—	—	—	—	0	0
2013	CHI	**16**	14	**89**	**1,421**	16.0	**80**	7	**16**	**105**	**6.6**	**38**	0	**3**	**1**
2014	CHI	**16**	**16**	85	1,133	13.3	74	**10**	6	33	5.5	12	0	1	0
2015	CHI	9	8	54	807	14.9	50	4	—	—	—	—	—	1	0
2016	CHI	12	12	52	821	15.8	54	2	—	—	—	—	—	0	0
2017	PHI	**16**	**16**	57	789	13.8	53	9	—	—	—	—	—	0	0
2018	PHI	13	13	65	843	13.0	52	6	—	—	—	—	—	1	0
2019	PHI	10	10	43	490	11.4	38	4	1	2	2.0	2	**1**	0	0
2020	PHI	7	2	6	115	**19.2**	39	1	—	—	—	—	—	0	0
Total		109	97	475	6,786	14.3	80	46	23	140	6.1	38	1	6	1

Postseason statistics
Year	Team	Games		Receiving					Rushing					Fumbles	
Year	Team	GP	GS	Rec	Yds	Avg	Lng	TD	Att	Yds	Avg	Lng	TD	Fum	Lost
2017	PHI	**3**	**3**	**12**	**219**	**18.3**	**53**	**3**	—	—	—	—	—	0	0
2018	PHI	2	2	11	145	13.2	30	0	—	—	—	—	—	0	0
Total		5	5	23	364	15.8	53	3	0	0	0.0	0	0	0	0

=== College ===
Season	Team	Conf	Class	Pos	GP	Receiving			
Season	Team	Conf	Class	Pos	GP	Rec	Yds	Avg	TD
2009	South Carolina	SEC	FR	WR	13	46	763	16.6	6
2010	South Carolina	SEC	SO	WR	14	88	1,517	17.2	9
2011	South Carolina	SEC	JR	WR	13	49	762	15.6	8
Career					40	183	3,042	16.6	23

== Personal life ==
On April 15, 2026, Jeffery was arrested in Encinitas, California for insurance fraud.
