= Calhoun County High School =

Location
- 150 Saints Avenue; St. Matthews, South Carolina 29135; United States; 33°39′55″N 80°47′57″W

Information
- School district: Calhoun County Schools
- CEEB code: 411755
- Principal: Milton Howard
- Teaching staff: 31.00 (FTE)
- Grades: 9–12
- Enrollment: 418 (2023-2024)
- Student to teacher ratio: 13.48
- Colors: Red, black and white
- Athletics: SCHSL Class AA, Region V
- Mascot: Saint
- Website: cchs.ccpsonline.net

Calhoun County High School is a public secondary school in St. Matthews, South Carolina, United States.

== Campus ==
The campus has a pasture with the new K–8 school in front of it on Saints Avenue.

== Extracurricular activities ==
The school's sports teams, known as the Saints, compete in the South Carolina High School League Class AA, Region V. They field teams in baseball, basketball, football, softball, track, and volleyball.

State championship titles held by the school's teams include:

- Boys' basketball: 1996 (AA), 2000 (AA), 2001 (AA), 2004 (AA), 2006 (A), 2007 (A), 2008 (A), 2009 (A)

The boys' basketball team holds the state record for consecutive wins, at 78.

== Notable alumni ==
- Mike Colter – actor
- Alshon Jeffery – NFL wide receiver
- Phillip Merling – NFL defensive end
- Chris Rumph – former head coach for the high school who spent over 20 years coaching collegiately and in the National Football League (NFL)
