= Double Doink =

2019 American football playoff game

2018 NFC Wild Card Game The "Double Doink"
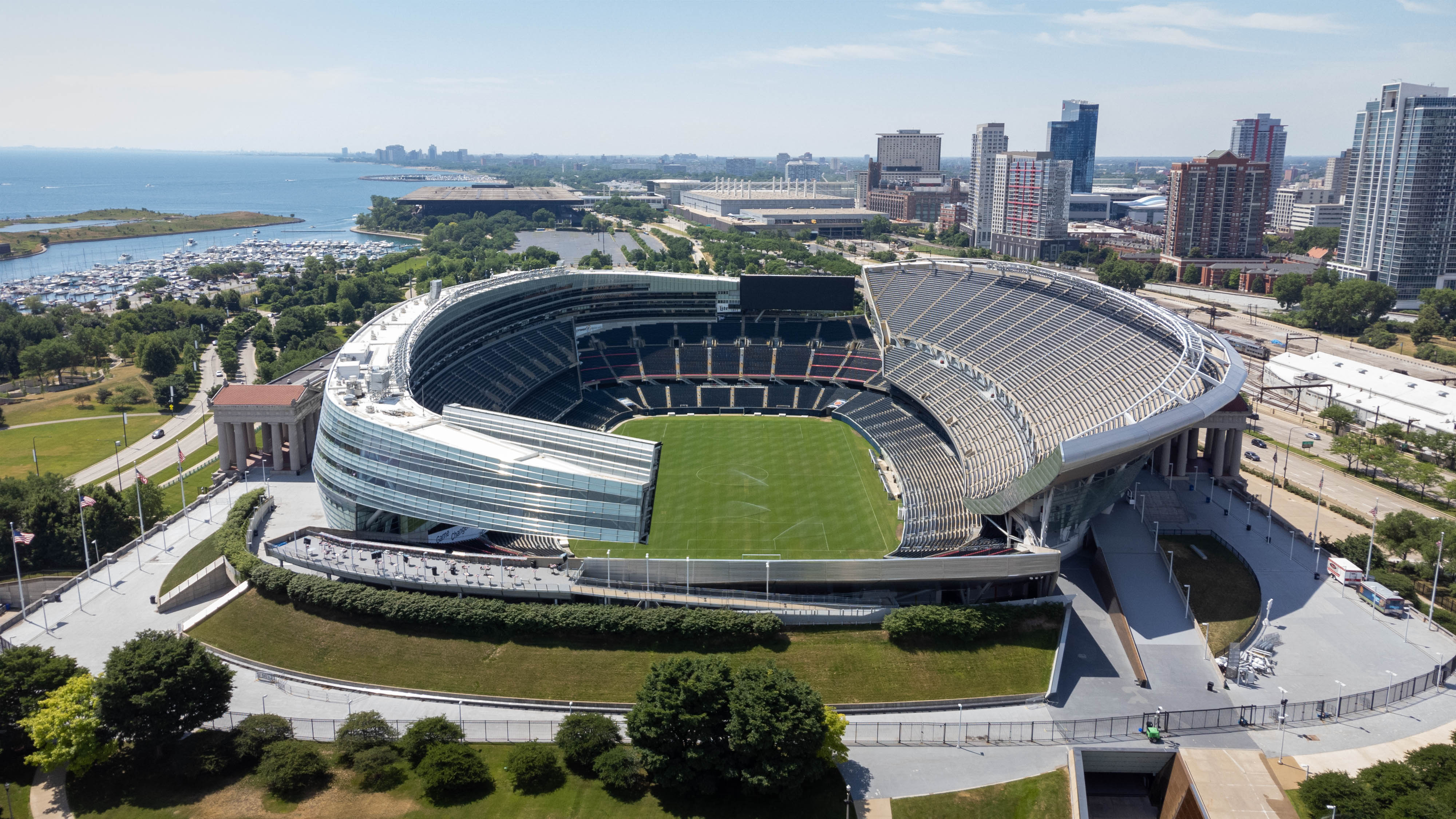
- Soldier Field, the site of the game
Philadelphia Eagles (6) (9–7)	Chicago Bears (3) (12–4)
16	15
Head coach: Doug Pederson	Head coach: Matt Nagy
	1	2	3	4	Total
PHI	3	0	7	6	16
CHI	0	6	0	9	15
- Date: January 6, 2019
- Stadium: Soldier Field; Chicago, Illinois
- Favorite: Bears by 6.5
- Referee: Tony Corrente
- Attendance: 62,462

TV in the United States
- Network: NBC
- Announcers: Al Michaels, Cris Collinsworth, Michele Tafoya, and Terry McAulay
- Nielsen ratings: 19.7 (national); U.S. Viewership: 35.9 million est. avg.

The Double Doink was a game-ending field goal attempt by Chicago Bears kicker Cody Parkey in the National Football League (NFL)'s 2018 NFC Wild Card game. Parkey's failed 43-yard field goal attempt against the Philadelphia Eagles was partially blocked by Eagles defensive lineman Treyvon Hester, hit the left upright, then bounced off the crossbar, and finally fell back out onto the goal line, finishing on the 3-yard line. The sixth-seeded, defending Super Bowl champion Eagles won the game over the third-seeded Bears, 16–15, at Soldier Field in Chicago, Illinois, and advanced to the Divisional Round of the playoffs.

The term "doink" has been used to refer to the percussive sound or thump that a football makes when striking a goal post. The term "double doink" took hold after NBC commentator Cris Collinsworth said on the broadcast during the replay that "The Bears' season's gonna end on a double doink." A frame-by-frame replay later revealed that the kick was actually tipped by Hester, and the NFL officially ruled the play a block.

The Bears, the NFC North Division champions, saw their season end with a 12–4 record. It was Parkey's 11th miss of the season, and his sixth kick attempt of the season (including two extra points and four field goals) to hit an upright. He was released by the Bears two months later. The Eagles lost the following week to the top-seeded New Orleans Saints in the NFC Divisional playoffs.

== Background ==
The defending Super Bowl champion Philadelphia Eagles entered Week 17 needing a road win against the Washington Redskins and for the Chicago Bears to defeat the Minnesota Vikings to qualify for the last wild card spot. Meanwhile, having already won the NFC North for the first time since 2010, the Bears were still contending for a first-round bye in Week 17 and needed a win and a loss by the Los Angeles Rams in order to move up to the #2 seed. In Week 17, the Eagles defeated the Redskins 24–0, the Bears defeated the Vikings 24–10, and the Rams defeated the San Francisco 49ers 48–32, meaning the Eagles managed to leap over the Vikings into the #6 seed, as the Eagles rallied from a 4–6 record to finish 9–7, winning their final three games after Carson Wentz was replaced with Nick Foles for the second consecutive year. Meanwhile, the Bears were locked into the NFC's #3 seed with a record of 12–4, having won 9 of their last 10 games heading into this NFC Wild Card playoff. This was the fourth postseason meeting between the Eagles and Bears, with the Eagles winning two of the previous three games.

== Game summary ==
=== First half ===
The Eagles started off the game with a good drive, including passes to Wendell Smallwood and Zach Ertz of 22 and 17-yards, respectively. However, the drive stalled after a Leonard Floyd sack forced the Eagles to settle for a 44-yard field goal, taking the lead, 3–0. After an exchange of punts, Eagles quarterback Nick Foles launched a 40-yard pass to former Bears wide receiver Alshon Jeffery. However, the drive was cut short when Roquan Smith picked off Foles at the Bears' 35-yard line. The Bears drove down the field and kicked a field goal to tie the game 3–3. The Eagles put together another strong drive, featuring 28-yard pass to Golden Tate. However, this drive was also stopped when Foles' pass was intercepted by Adrian Amos in the end zone. After punts by both teams, the Bears put together a 13 play, 78-yard drive that resulted in a 29-yard Cody Parkey field goal to give the Bears a 6–3 halftime lead.

=== Second half ===
The Eagles finally found some success on offense in the second half, capping an 83-yard drive with a 10-yard touchdown pass from Foles to tight end Dallas Goedert. After punts by both teams, Bears quarterback Mitchell Trubisky completed a 45-yard pass to Allen Robinson, which set up a 34-yard field goal by Parkey, cutting the Eagles' lead to 10–9. In the Bears' following drive, Trubisky completed passes of 19 and 34-yards to Taylor Gabriel and Joshua Bellamy, respectively. He finished off the drive with a 22-yard touchdown pass to Robinson to make the score 15–10. The Bears attempted a two-point conversion, but failed. After another exchange of punts, the Eagles drove all the way down to the Bears' 2-yard line. After two runs by Darren Sproles for no gain and an incomplete pass, the Eagles faced a 4th and goal 1:01 left in the fourth quarter, and Foles found Tate in the endzone for the touchdown. The Eagles went for two but failed. On the Bears' next drive, Trubisky completed passes of 25 and 8 yards, both to Robinson, and spiked the ball with 0:10 left in the game.

== The play ==
After Trubisky's spike, the Bears set up for a 43-yard field goal. However, immediately prior to the snap, Eagles head coach Doug Pederson called a time-out to ice the kicker. Even though whistles were blown to signify the timeout, Parkey attempted the kick and made it, although it didn't count. After the timeout, Parkey's next attempt was tipped by Treyvon Hester, ricocheted off the left upright, bounced off the crossbar and landed in the end zone.

Parkey later reacted, "I feel terrible. There's really no answer to it. I thought I hit a good ball."

=== TV call ===
Al Michaels and Cris Collinsworth were the announcers for NBC:

Michaels: And... Oh! It hits the upright again! That's impossible!
Collinsworth: (during replay) Oh my goodness... The Bears' season's gonna end on a double doink.

Collinsworth is often mistakenly credited with coining the phrase "double doink"; Chris Berman of NFL Primetime first used the phrase in 2000 when describing a missed field goal by Detroit Lions kicker Jason Hanson. When asked about it the following day, Collinsworth said, "I don't think I invented the word; I think John Madden said doink first. But it was this double dinky thing — the ball bounced off one and then the other."

=== Bears radio call ===
Jeff Joniak called the missed kick with Tom Thayer for WBBM-AM, describing the snap by long snapper Patrick Scales, the hold by holder Pat O'Donnell, and the kick by Parkey:

Joniak: Parkey lines it up, O'Donnell on one knee. Gives him a look, extends his arm. Scales sends it back, placement made, kick from 43 and it hit the upright and is no good! On the crossbar. And the Eagles are celebrating here at Soldier Field.

=== Eagles radio call ===
Merrill Reese and Mike Quick were on radio call for WIP-FM:

Reese: Ball ... is snapped. Placed. Kicked. And it is ... no good! No good! It is no good, and the Eagles win.
Quick: He missed it!

=== Spanish radio call ===
Rickie Ricardo, the Philadelphia Eagles Spanish language radio announcer, said:

¡No, señor! ¡No, señor! ¡No, señor! ¡No, señor! ¡No, señor! ¡No, señor!

The memorable call translates to "No, sir! No, sir! No, sir! No, sir! No, sir! No, sir!" This was similar to his 2017 call when Philadelphia Eagles kicker Jake Elliott kicked a game-winning 61-yard field goal to beat the New York Giants in which he said "Si, señor!" ("Yes, sir!"). He said in an interview: "'Si, señor' is very easy for everyone—the lowest common denominator, you don't have to think much. It's very simple for Hispanics, but if you don't speak Spanish it doesn't take much thought. This guy missed a kick. You could not know one phrase in Spanish and you know what's going on."

== Aftermath ==
The following day, the NFL officially declared the kick attempt a block. After a frame-by-frame replay, Eagles defensive lineman Treyvon Hester's finger was visibly knocked back as the ball brushed his finger.

Five days after the miss, Parkey discussed it with the anchors on NBC's Today show. The appearance had not been cleared by the Bears front office, and Parkey was criticized by local sportswriters, fans and head coach Matt Nagy, who said in a press conference the following Monday: "We always talk about a 'we' and not a 'me' thing, and we always talk as a team, we win as a team, we lose as a team. I didn't necessarily think [the Today appearance] was too much of a 'we' thing."

On February 22, 2019, it was reported that Parkey would be released despite a $3.5 million guaranteed contract for 2019. He was officially released on March 13. His departure sparked a dramatized "kicker competition" for the Bears, who ultimately selected Eddy Piñeiro. Parkey moved on to play for the Tennessee Titans, the Cleveland Browns, and the New Orleans Saints.

The Eagles lost their next game against the New Orleans Saints, 20–14, after being shut out in the final three quarters.

Members of the 2018–19 St. Louis Blues NHL team watched the game at the Jacks NYB bar in South Philadelphia, where they heard the Laura Branigan song "Gloria" and adopted it as their unofficial victory theme. The Blues went on a winning streak, which led them to making the 2019 Stanley Cup Finals and winning their first Stanley Cup in franchise history.

Bill Swerski's Super Fans spoofed the play in a sketch created for the opening game of the 2019 season between the Bears and the Green Bay Packers. In the scene, a teddy bear purported to be sold in Green Bay said "double doink" when squeezed. A follow-up scene revealed that the teddy bears were created by former Packers quarterback Brett Favre, who joyfully points out that it also comes with its own goalpost showing the ball hitting the upright.

A second "double doink" at Soldier Field occurred during Sunday Night Football on December 22, 2019, kicked by Kansas City Chiefs kicker Harrison Butker, in the same north end zone, on an extra point attempt. This time, the ball hit both uprights and not the crossbar.

A third "double doink" occurred during a 2022 NFL International Series game between the New Orleans Saints and the Minnesota Vikings, kicked by Saints kicker Wil Lutz in an attempt to tie the game. After successfully kicking a career record 60-yard field goal that game, Lutz attempted a 61-yard field goal. Lutz's attempt, like Parkey's, bounced off the left upright and the crossbar. The Saints lost the game 28–25 in part because of that missed field goal.

== Box score ==
2018 NFC Wild Card Playoffs: (6) Philadelphia Eagles at (3) Chicago Bears – Game summary

Quarter	1	2	3	4	Total
Eagles	3	0	7	6	16
Bears	0	6	0	9	15

at Soldier Field, Chicago, Illinois

- Date: January 6, 2019
- Game time: 3:40 p.m. CST/4:40 p.m. EST
- Game weather: Mostly cloudy, 39 °F (4 °C)
- Game attendance: 62,462
- Referee: Tony Corrente (99)
- TV announcers (NBC): Al Michaels, Cris Collinsworth, Michele Tafoya and Terry McAulay
- Recap, Game book

Game information

First quarter

- PHI - Jake Elliott 43-yard field goal, 9:32. Eagles 3–0. Drive: 10 plays, 50-yards, 5:28.

Second quarter

- CHI - Cody Parkey 36-yard field goal, 9:38. Tied 3–3. Drive: 8 plays, 47 yards, 4:43.
- CHI - Cody Parkey 29-yard field goal, 0:00. Bears 6–3. Drive: 13 plays, 78 yards, 2:38.

Third quarter

- PHI - Dallas Goedert 10-yard pass from Nick Foles (Jake Elliott kick), 5:20. Eagles 10–6. Drive: 7 plays, 83 yards, 4:23.

Fourth quarter

- CHI - Cody Parkey 34-yard field goal, 14:13. Eagles 10–9. Drive: 6 plays, 62 yards, 2:20.
- CHI - Allen Robinson 22-yard pass from Mitchell Trubisky (pass failed), 9:04. Bears 15–10. Drive: 6 plays, 80 yards, 2:56.
- PHI - Golden Tate 2-yard pass from Nick Foles (run failed), 0:56. Eagles 16–15. Drive: 12 plays, 60 yards, 3:52.

Top passers

- PHI – Nick Foles – 25/40, 226 yards, 2 TD, 2 INT
- CHI – Mitchell Trubisky – 26/43, 303 yards, TD

Top rushers

- PHI – Darren Sproles – 13 rushes, 21 yards
- CHI – Jordan Howard – 10 rushes, 35 yards

Top receivers

- PHI – Alshon Jeffery – 6 receptions, 82 yards
- CHI – Allen Robinson – 10 receptions, 143 yards, TD

== Starting lineups ==
Philadelphia	Position		Chicago
Offense
Nelson Agholor	WR		Taylor Gabriel
Jason Peters	LT		Charles Leno
Isaac Seumalo	LG		James Daniels
Jason Kelce	C		Cody Whitehair
Brandon Brooks	RG		Kyle Long
Lane Johnson	RT		Bobby Massie
Zach Ertz	TE		Ben Braunecker
Golden Tate	WR		Allen Robinson
Nick Foles	QB		Mitchell Trubisky
Wendell Smallwood	RB		Jordan Howard
Alshon Jeffery	WR	TE	Adam Shaheen
Defense
Timmy Jernigan	DT		Akiem Hicks
Michael Bennett	DE	NT	Eddie Goldman
Fletcher Cox	DT	N	Deon Bush
Brandon Graham	DE	ILB	Danny Trevathan
Jordan Hicks	MLB	ILB	Roquan Smith
Kamu Grugier-Hill	OLB		Leonard Floyd
Nigel Bradham	OLB		Khalil Mack
Avonte Maddox	CB		Kyle Fuller
Rasul Douglas	CB		Prince Amukamara
Corey Graham	S		Sherrick McManis
Malcolm Jenkins	S		Adrian Amos

== Officials ==
- Referee: Tony Corrente (99)
- Umpire: Ramon George (128)
- Down judge: Jerod Phillips (6)
- Line judge: Kent Payne (79)
- Field judge: Allen Baynes (56)
- Side judge: Mike Weatherford (116)
- Back judge: Todd Prukop (30)

== See also ==
- 2018–19 NFL playoffs
- Quadruple doink
- Wide Right (Buffalo Bills)
- Fog Bowl (American football)
- List of nicknamed NFL games and plays
