= Cody Parkey =

American football player (born 1992)

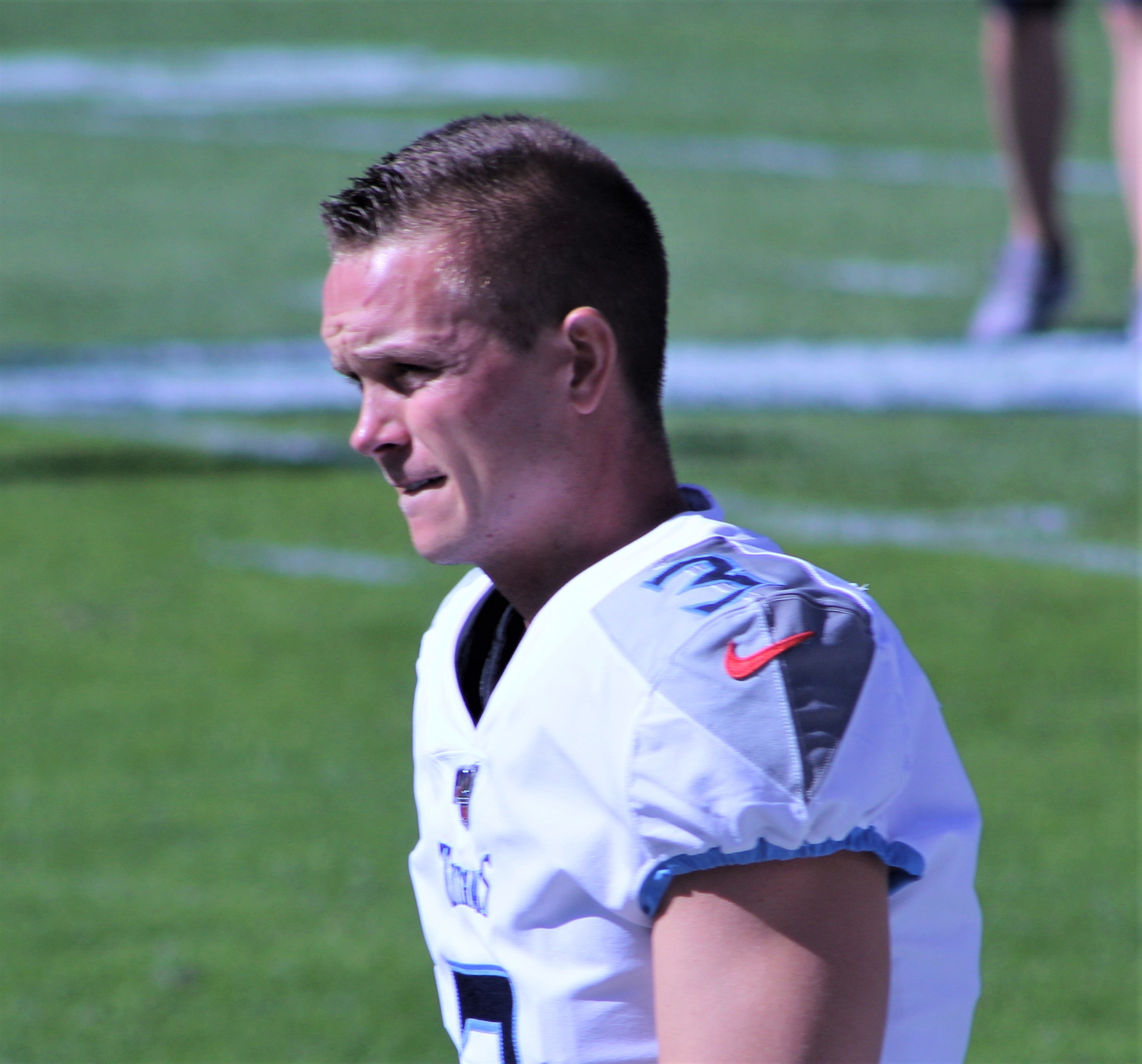
- Parkey with the Tennessee Titans in 2019

No. 1, 3, 2, 6
- Position: Placekicker

Personal information
- Born: February 19, 1992 (age 34); Jupiter, Florida, U.S.
- Listed height: 6 ft 0 in (1.83 m)
- Listed weight: 190 lb (86 kg)

Career information
- High school: Jupiter
- College: Auburn (2010–2013)
- NFL draft: 2014: undrafted

Career history
- Indianapolis Colts (2014)*; Philadelphia Eagles (2014–2015); Cleveland Browns (2016); Miami Dolphins (2017); Chicago Bears (2018); Tennessee Titans (2019); Cleveland Browns (2020); New Orleans Saints (2021)
- * Offseason or practice squad member only

Awards and highlights
- Pro Bowl (2014); PFWA All-Rookie Team (2014); BCS national champion (2010); Second-team All-SEC (2013); NFL record: Most points scored in a season by a rookie: 150 (2014)

Career NFL statistics
- Field goals made: 121
- Field goals attempted: 143
- Field goal %: 84.6
- Longest field goal: 54
- Stats at Pro Football Reference

Cody Parkey (born February 19, 1992) is an American former professional football player who was a placekicker in the National Football League (NFL). He played college football for the Auburn Tigers and was signed by the Indianapolis Colts as an undrafted free agent in 2014. Parkey saw early success in his NFL career, being selected to the Pro Bowl that same year after being traded to the Philadelphia Eagles. He was also a member of the Cleveland Browns, Miami Dolphins, Chicago Bears, Tennessee Titans, and New Orleans Saints.

During a 2018–2019 Bears playoff game against his former team, the Eagles, Parkey missed a potential game-winning kick that became known as the Double Doink, striking an upright and the crossbar before falling to the ground.

== College career ==
Parkey played college football at Auburn University from 2010 to 2013. As a freshman in 2010, he only appeared in two games but made both extra points he attempted. As a sophomore in 2011, he converted 41 of 42 extra point attempts and 13 of 18 field goal attempts. As a junior in 2012, he converted all 27 extra point attempts and 11 of 14 field goal attempts. As a senior in 2013, he converted 66 of 67 extra point attempts and 15 of 21 field goal attempts.

== Professional career ==
Pre-draft measurables
| Height | Weight | Arm length | Hand span |
|---|---|---|---|
| 6 ft 0 1/4 in (1.84 m) | 189 lb (86 kg) | 29 5/8 in (0.75 m) | 9 3/4 in (0.25 m) |
All values from Pro Day

=== Indianapolis Colts ===
After going undrafted in the 2014 NFL draft, Parkey signed with the Indianapolis Colts. He was traded by the Colts to the Philadelphia Eagles for running back David Fluellen on August 20, 2014.

=== Philadelphia Eagles ===
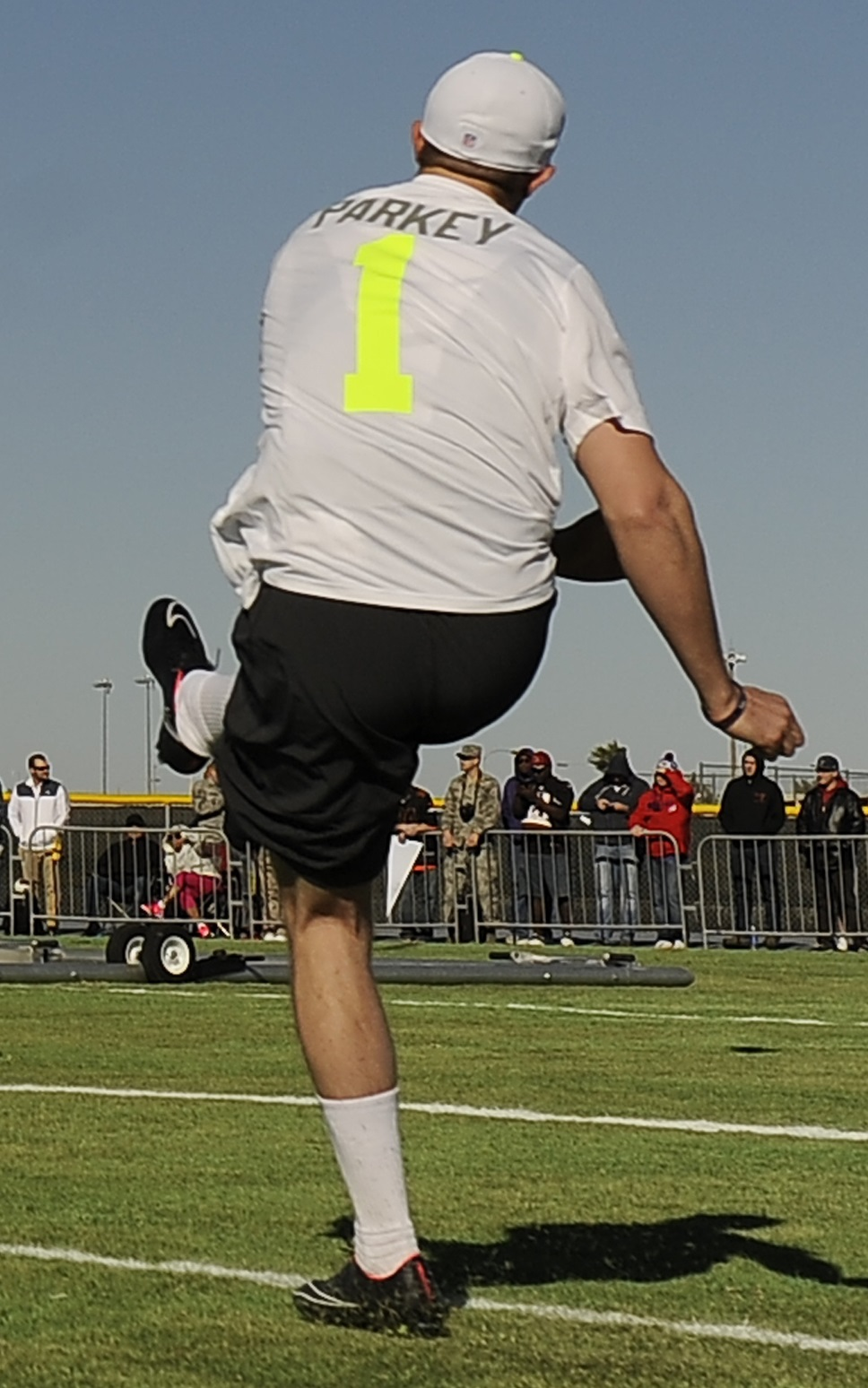
Parkey at the Pro Bowl in 2014

After a stellar preseason, Parkey beat out Alex Henery to be the Philadelphia Eagles' kicker for the 2014 season.

In 2014, Parkey set a new NFL rookie scoring record. His 150 points broke Kevin Butler's 29-year-old record of 144 points set in 1985 with the Chicago Bears. Parkey tied with Stephen Gostkowski for the highest average of points scored per game in the 2014 NFL season. Parkey was named a first-alternative for the 2015 Pro Bowl. He was named to the PFWA All-Rookie Team. On January 18, 2015, Parkey replaced Gostkowski in the Pro Bowl due to the Patriots' involvement in Super Bowl XLIX.

On September 28, 2015, Parkey was placed on injured reserve with a groin injury.

On September 3, 2016, he was waived by the Eagles.

=== Cleveland Browns (first stint) ===
On September 24, 2016, Parkey signed with the Cleveland Browns after an injury to Patrick Murray. In his first game against the Miami Dolphins on September 25, he missed three field goal attempts, including a potential game-winning 46-yard attempt on the final play of regulation. Parkey was waived by the Browns on September 2, 2017.

=== Miami Dolphins ===
On September 3, 2017, Parkey was claimed off waivers by the Miami Dolphins. In Week 2, against the Los Angeles Chargers, Parkey was awarded AFC Special Teams Player of the Week for scoring 13 of the Dolphins 19 points (four field goals and an extra point), including a 54-yard game-winning field goal.

=== Chicago Bears ===
Parkey in a game against the San Francisco 49ers in 2018

On March 14, 2018, Parkey signed a four-year contract with the Chicago Bears.

On November 11, 2018, against the Detroit Lions, Parkey had four kicks (two extra points and two field goals) strike the uprights; none went through. Despite his misses, the Bears won 34–22. In Week 11 against the Minnesota Vikings, Parkey made three field goals in the 25–20 win. He was named the NFC Special Teams Player of the Week for his performance. Parkey ended the regular season having made 23 of 30 field goal attempts, a 77% completion rate.

Late in the 2018–19 NFC wild card playoff game against the Philadelphia Eagles, with the Bears down 16–15, Parkey had a chance to win the game on a 43-yard field goal. The Eagles called a timeout before the snap to negate Parkey's first field goal try. On his second attempt, Parkey's kick was a miss as the ball hit the left upright and crossbar before landing back out into the end zone. Parkey later reacted, "I feel terrible. There's really no answer to it. I thought I hit a good ball." The kick became known as the "Double Doink" after NBC color commentator Cris Collinsworth stated immediately afterward, "Oh my goodness, the Bears' season is going to end on a double doink". After the game, however, frame-by-frame replay showed that the kick was tipped by Eagles defensive tackle Treyvon Hester, which could have caused the ball to change trajectory and lean leftward. The NFL officially ruled that the kick was a blocked field goal.

Five days after the miss, Parkey discussed it with anchors of NBC's Today show in an appearance, a move for which he did not get clearance from the Bears front office and received criticism from local sportswriters and fans. Head coach Matt Nagy said in a press conference the following Monday, "We always talk about a ‘we’ and not a ‘me’ thing, and we always talk as a team, we win as a team, we lose as a team. I didn't necessarily think [the Today appearance] was too much of a ‘we’ thing.”

On February 22, 2019, it was reported Parkey would be released at the start of the league year after 11 missed kicks in his first season and $3.5 million guaranteed still on his 2019 contract. He was officially released on March 13.

=== Tennessee Titans ===
Parkey was signed by the Tennessee Titans on October 8, 2019. He was released on November 2, after Ryan Succop returned from injury.

=== Cleveland Browns (second stint) ===
The Browns signed Parkey to their practice squad on September 6, 2020. He was promoted to the team's active roster on September 14. Parkey was placed on the reserve/COVID-19 list by the team on November 18, and activated three days later.

On March 19, 2021, Parkey re-signed with the Browns. The Browns placed Parkey on injured reserve on August 23. He was released off injured reserve the next day.

=== New Orleans Saints ===
On October 6, 2021, Parkey signed with the New Orleans Saints. He suffered a groin injury in Week 5 and was released with an injury settlement on October 12.

== NFL career statistics ==
Legend
| **Bold** | Career high |

=== Regular season ===
| General | | | Field goals | | | | | PATs | | | Kickoffs | | | Points |
| Season | Team | GP | FGM | FGA | FG% | Blck | Long | XPM | XPA | XP% | KO | Avg | TBs | Pts |
|---|---|---|---|---|---|---|---|---|---|---|---|---|---|---|
| 2014 | PHI | **16** | **32** | **36** | 88.9% | 0 | **54** | **54** | **54** | **100.0%** | **98** | **65.3** | 46 | **150** |
| 2015 | PHI | 3 | 3 | 4 | 75.0% | 0 | 46 | 7 | 7 | **100.0%** | 13 | 58.0 | 3 | 16 |
| 2016 | CLE | 14 | 20 | 25 | 80.0% | 0 | 51 | 20 | 21 | 95.2% | 57 | 61.0 | 34 | 80 |
| 2017 | MIA | **16** | 21 | 23 | 91.3% | 0 | **54** | 26 | 29 | 89.7% | 67 | 59.9 | 28 | 89 |
| 2018 | CHI | **16** | 23 | 30 | 76.7% | 0 | 50 | 42 | 45 | 93.3% | 89 | 63.2 | **65** | 111 |
| 2019 | TEN | 3 | 3 | 3 | **100.0%** | 0 | 51 | 5 | 6 | 83.3% | 12 | 62.8 | 9 | 14 |
| 2020 | CLE | 15 | 19 | 22 | 86.4% | **1** | 46 | 43 | 47 | 91.5% | 81 | 63.5 | 45 | 100 |
| 2021 | NO | 1 | - | - | - | - | - | 3 | 5 | 60.0% | 3 | 65.0 | 1 | 3 |
| Career | | 84 | 121 | 143 | 84.6% | 1 | 54 | 200 | 214 | 93.5% | 420 | 62.8 | 231 | 563 |

=== Postseason ===
| General | | | Field goals | | | | | PATs | | | Kickoffs | | | Points |
| Season | Team | GP | FGM | FGA | FG% | Blck | Long | XPM | XPA | XP% | KO | Avg | TBs | Pts |
|---|---|---|---|---|---|---|---|---|---|---|---|---|---|---|
| 2018 | CHI | 1 | 3 | 4 | 75.0% | 1 | 36 | - | - | - | 4 | 63.8 | 2 | 9 |
| 2020 | CLE | 2 | 3 | 3 | 100.0% | 0 | 46 | 8 | 8 | 100.0% | 13 | 64.9 | 7 | 17 |
| Career | | 3 | 6 | 7 | 85.7% | 1 | 46 | 8 | 8 | 100.0% | 17 | 64.6 | 9 | 26 |
