= 2020 Philadelphia Eagles season =

88th season in franchise history

- Owner: Jeffrey Lurie
- General manager: Howie Roseman
- Head coach: Doug Pederson
- Home stadium: Lincoln Financial Field

Results
- Record: 4–11–1
- Division place: 4th NFC East
- Playoffs: Did not qualify
- Pro Bowlers: DE Brandon Graham; DT Fletcher Cox; C Jason Kelce

Uniform
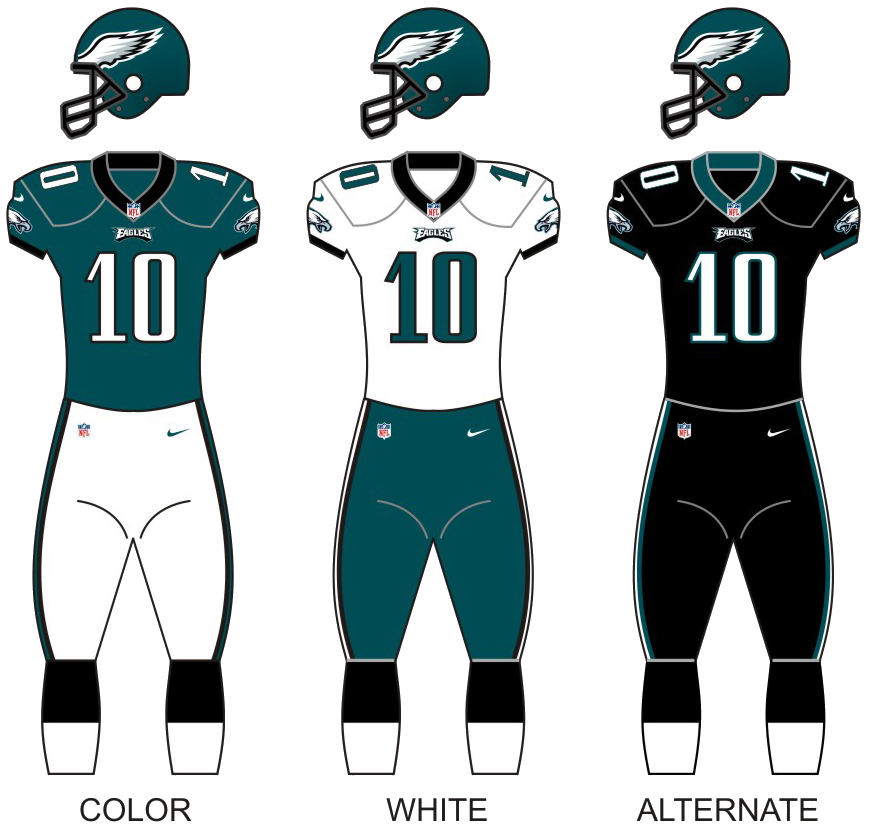

The 2020 season was the Philadelphia Eagles' 88th in the National Football League (NFL) and their fifth and final under head coach Doug Pederson. They failed to improve on their 9–7 record from the previous season following a 23–17 loss to the Seattle Seahawks in Week 12. They were eliminated from playoff contention for the first time since 2016 following a Week 16 loss to the Dallas Cowboys and finished with a dismal 4–11–1 record, the second-worst in the National Football Conference (NFC), and their worst since 2012. After starting 3–4–1 heading into their bye week and leading the NFC East, the Eagles would lose 7 of their last 8 games. Injuries and poor quarterback play were factors in their struggles in the season. On January 11, 2021, the Eagles announced head coach Doug Pederson would not return after the season, as he was dismissed the same day. For the first time since 1998, the Eagles failed to score 30 or more points in a single game the entire season. Their .281 winning percentage was their worst since 2012. Overall, Carson Wentz, statistically, had one of the poorest seasons by a quarterback in franchise history, throwing for 2,620 yards, 16 touchdowns, 15 interceptions, and completed just 57.4% of his passes (251 for 437) to go with his 72.8 passer rating. He also got sacked 50 times for 326 yards.

On July 14, 2020, the city of Philadelphia placed a ban on large events for six months, meaning that the Eagles' home games would have no fans in attendance. However, starting in week 6, Philadelphia Mayor Jim Kenney announced that the city would allow 7,500 fans to attend Eagles home games. This was reversed on November 16, 2020, as the city of Philadelphia implemented outdoor restrictions.

The season also marked the end of the Carson Wentz era in Philadelphia as he was traded to the Indianapolis Colts in the 2021 off-season. As of the 2025 season, this is the most recent season in which the Eagles missed the playoffs, finished with a losing record, and finished in last place in the NFC East.

== Roster changes ==
=== Free agents ===
Position	Player	Tag	2020 team	Notes
WR	Nelson Agholor	UFA	Las Vegas Raiders	1-year deal
RB	Corey Clement	UFA	Philadelphia Eagles	1-year deal
DE	Vinny Curry	UFA	Philadelphia Eagles	1-year deal
CB	Ronald Darby	UFA	Washington Football Team	1-year deal
LB	Kamu Grugier-Hill	UFA	Miami Dolphins	1-year deal
RB	Jordan Howard	UFA	Miami Dolphins	2-year deal
DT	Timmy Jernigan	UFA	Jacksonville Jaguars	1-year deal
QB	Josh McCown	UFA	Philadelphia Eagles	1-year deal
S	Rodney McLeod	UFA	Philadelphia Eagles	2-year deal
CB	Jalen Mills	UFA	Philadelphia Eagles	1-year deal
OT	Jason Peters	UFA	Philadelphia Eagles	1-year deal
DT	Hassan Ridgeway	UFA	Philadelphia Eagles	1-year deal
TE	Richard Rodgers	UFA	Washington Football Team	TBD
QB	Nate Sudfeld	UFA	Philadelphia Eagles	1-year deal
OT	Halapoulivaati Vaitai	UFA	Detroit Lions	5-year deal

Player re-signed by the Eagles	Player not re-signed by the Eagles

=== Signings ===
Position	Player	Tag	2019 team	Date signed	Notes
DT	Javon Hargrave	UFA	Pittsburgh Steelers	March 18	3-year deal, $39 million
LB	Jatavis Brown	UFA	Los Angeles Chargers	March 21	1-year deal, $1.047 million
S	Will Parks	UFA	Denver Broncos	March 21	1-year deal, $1.6 million
CB	Nickell Robey-Coleman	UFA	Los Angeles Rams	March 25	1-year deal, $1.3 million
OT	Casey Tucker	UFA	Detroit Lions	April 28	Waiver claim

=== Departures ===
Position	Player	2020 team	Date	Reason
RB	Darren Sproles	N/A	December 21	Retired
LB	Nigel Bradham	New Orleans Saints	February 19	Released
S	Malcolm Jenkins	New Orleans Saints	March 17	Released
WR	Marken Michel	Carolina Panthers	April 30	Released
WR	River Cracraft	San Francisco 49ers	April 30	Released

=== Trades ===
- March 19: The Eagles traded a third-round pick in the 2020 NFL draft and a fifth-round pick in the 2020 NFL draft to the Detroit Lions for CB Darius Slay.
- April 25: The Eagles traded their sixth-round pick in the 2020 NFL draft, 190th overall, to the San Francisco 49ers for their sixth-round pick, 210th overall, and Marquise Goodwin

== Draft ==
2020 Philadelphia Eagles draft
Round	Pick	Player	Position	College	Notes
1	21	Jalen Reagor	WR	TCU	
2	53	Jalen Hurts *	QB	Oklahoma	
3	103	Davion Taylor	LB	Colorado	Compensatory pick
4	127	K'Von Wallace	S	Clemson	
4	145	Jack Driscoll	OG	Auburn	Compensatory pick
5	168	John Hightower	WR	Boise State	from New England
6	196	Shaun Bradley	ILB	Temple	from Chicago
6	200	Quez Watkins	WR	Southern Miss	from Chicago
6	210	Prince Tega Wanogho	OT	Auburn	from San Francisco
7	233	Casey Toohill	LB	Stanford	from Chicago
Made roster † Pro Football Hall of Fame * Made at least one Pro Bowl during career

Notes

- The Eagles acquired one additional seventh-round selection, along with wide receiver DeSean Jackson, in a trade that sent their 2019 sixth-round selection to the Tampa Bay Buccaneers. However, the Eagles made trades with the Atlanta Falcons and the New England Patriots involving both their own seventh-round selection and the one acquired from the Buccaneers.
- The Eagles acquired an additional fifth-round selection in a trade that sent one of their seventh-round selections and defensive end Michael Bennett to the Patriots.
- The Eagles acquired an additional sixth-round selection, along with linebacker Duke Riley, in a trade that sent one of their seventh-round selections and safety Johnathan Cyprien to the Falcons.
- The Eagles traded a sixth-round selection to the Chicago Bears in exchange for running back Jordan Howard.
- As the result of the negative differential of free agent signings and departures that the Eagles experienced during the first wave of the 2019 free agency period, the team is projected to receive two compensatory selections for the 2020 draft. Free agent transactions that occurred after May 7, 2019, did not factor into the team's formula for determining compensatory selections.
- The Eagles traded a third-round and fifth-round selection in the 2020 NFL draft to the Detroit Lions for cornerback Darius Slay.

Undrafted free agents
Player	Position	College
Grayland Arnold	CB	Baylor
Manasseh Bailey	WR	Morgan State
Julian Good-Jones	OG	Iowa State
Michael Jacquet	CB	Louisiana
Luke Juriga	C	Western Michigan
Adrian Killins	RB	UCF
Dante Olson	LB	Montana
Elijah Riley	S	Army
Prince Smith	CB	New Hampshire
Khalil Tate	WR	Arizona
Noah Togiai	TE	Oregon State
Michael Warren	RB	Cincinnati
Raequan Williams	DT	Michigan State

== Staff ==
2020 Philadelphia Eagles staff
Front office: Chairman/CEO – Jeffrey Lurie; President – Don Smolenski; General manager/executive vice president – Howie Roseman; Director of football administration – Bryce Johnston; Vice president of player personnel – Andy Weidl; Senior football advisor – Tom Donahoe; Director of pro scouting – Brandon Brown; Assistant director of player personnel – Ian Cunningham; Director of team development – Joe Pannunzio; Special assistant to the general manager – Connor Barwin; Head coaches: Head coach – Doug Pederson; Assistant head coach/running backs – Duce Staley; Offensive coaches: Passing game coordinator/quarterbacks – Press Taylor; Assistant run game coordinator/assistant running backs – T. J. Paganetti; Wide receivers – Aaron Moorehead; Assistant wide receivers – Matthew Harper; Tight ends – Justin Peelle; Assistant tight ends – Mike Bartrum; Run game coordinator/offensive line – Jeff Stoutland; Assistant offensive line – Roy Istvan; Senior offensive assistant – Rich Scangarello; Pass game analyst – Andrew Breiner; Senior offensive consultant – Marty Mornhinweg	Defensive coaches: Defensive coordinator – Jim Schwartz; Assistant coordinator/defense – Dino Vasso; Run game coordinator/defensive line – Matt Burke; Assistant defensive line – Nate Ollie; Linebackers – Ken Flajole; Assistant linebackers/game management – Ryan Paganetti; Defensive backs – Marquand Manuel; Safeties – Tim Hauck; Special teams coaches: Special teams coordinator – Dave Fipp; Assistant special teams – Luke Thompson; Strength and conditioning: Director of player performance – Ted Rath; Head strength coach – Josh Hingst; Assistant strength coach – Keith Gray

== Final roster ==
2020 Philadelphia Eagles roster
Quarterbacks (QB): 2 Jalen Hurts; 7 Nate Sudfeld; 11 Carson Wentz; Running backs (RB): 30 Corey Clement; 32 Jason Huntley; 26 Miles Sanders; 35 Boston Scott KR; Wide receivers (WR): 19 J. J. Arcega-Whiteside; 13 Travis Fulgham; 82 John Hightower; 10 DeSean Jackson; 17 Alshon Jeffery; 18 Jalen Reagor; 84 Greg Ward PR; 80 Quez Watkins; Tight ends (TE): 81 Jason Croom; 86 Zach Ertz; 88 Dallas Goedert; 85 Richard Rodgers; 83 Caleb Wilson	Offensive linemen (OL): 67 Nate Herbig G; 74 Luke Juriga C; 62 Jason Kelce C; 68 Jordan Mailata T; 66 Ross Pierschbacher G; 69 Matt Pryor G; 73 Isaac Seumalo G; 64 Brett Toth T; Defensive linemen (DL): 58 Genard Avery DE; 96 Derek Barnett DE; 91 Fletcher Cox DT; 75 Vinny Curry DE; 55 Brandon Graham DE; 93 Javon Hargrave DT; 97 Malik Jackson DT; 76 T. Y. McGill DT; 61 Raequan Williams DT	Linebackers (LB): 59 Joe Bachie OLB; 57 T. J. Edwards MLB; 49 Alex Singleton OLB; 53 Rashad Smith OLB; Defensive backs (DB): 37 Grayland Arnold FS; 22 Marcus Epps FS; 36 Rudy Ford SS; 38 Michael Jacquet CB; 48 Elijah Riley SS; 24 Darius Slay CB; 42 K'Von Wallace FS; Special teams (ST): 4 Jake Elliott K; 1 Cameron Johnston P; 45 Rick Lovato LS	Practice squad: 16 Deontay Burnett WR; 89 Hakeem Butler TE; 33 Blake Countess CB; 90 Treyvon Hester DT; 47 Lavert Hill CB; 33 Elijah Holyfield RB; 46 Jameson Houston CB; 28 Jordan Howard RB; 46 Adrian Killins RB (COVID-19); 64 Matt Leo DE (IPP); 95 Joe Ostman DE; 76 Casey Tucker T; 72 Prince Tega Wanogho T; Reserve: 54 Shaun Bradley MLB (IR); 79 Brandon Brooks G (IR/DFR); 77 Andre Dillard T (IR); 63 Jack Driscoll T (IR); 47 Nathan Gerry OLB (IR); 13 Marquise Goodwin WR (Opt-out); 39 Craig James CB (IR); 65 Lane Johnson T (IR); 34 Cre'Von LeBlanc CB (IR); 29 Avonte Maddox CB (IR); 23 Rodney McLeod FS (IR); 21 Jalen Mills SS (COVID-19); 78 Sua Opeta G (IR); 81 Joshua Perkins TE (IR); 71 Jason Peters T (IR); 98 Hassan Ridgeway DT (IR); 50 Duke Riley OLB (IR); 31 Nickell Robey-Coleman CB (COVID-19); 41 Kevon Seymour S (IR); 94 Josh Sweat DE (IR); 52 Davion Taylor OLB (IR/DFR); Rookies in italics 52 active, 20 reserve, 12 practice squad (1 exempt)

== Preseason ==
The Eagles' preseason schedule was announced on May 7, but was later cancelled due to the COVID-19 pandemic.

Week	Date	Opponent	Venue	Result
1	August 13	at Indianapolis Colts	Lucas Oil Stadium	Cancelled due to the COVID-19 pandemic
2	August 20	at Miami Dolphins	Hard Rock Stadium	Cancelled due to the COVID-19 pandemic
3	August 27	New England Patriots	Lincoln Financial Field	Cancelled due to the COVID-19 pandemic
4	September 3	New York Jets	Lincoln Financial Field	Cancelled due to the COVID-19 pandemic

== Regular season ==
=== Schedule ===
The Eagles' 2020 schedule was announced on May 7.

Week	Date	Opponent	Result	Record	Venue	Recap
1	September 13	at **Washington Football Team**	**L** 17–27	0–1	FedExField	Recap
2	September 20	Los Angeles Rams	**L** 19–37	0–2	Lincoln Financial Field	Recap
3	September 27	Cincinnati Bengals	**T** 23–23 (OT)	0–2–1	Lincoln Financial Field	Recap
4	October 4	at San Francisco 49ers	**W** 25–20	1–2–1	Levi's Stadium	Recap
5	October 11	at Pittsburgh Steelers	**L** 29–38	1–3–1	Heinz Field	Recap
6	October 18	Baltimore Ravens	**L** 28–30	1–4–1	Lincoln Financial Field	Recap
7	October 22	**New York Giants**	**W** 22–21	2–4–1	Lincoln Financial Field	Recap
8	November 1	**Dallas Cowboys**	**W** 23–9	3–4–1	Lincoln Financial Field	Recap
9	Bye					
10	November 15	at **New York Giants**	**L** 17–27	3–5–1	MetLife Stadium	Recap
11	November 22	at Cleveland Browns	**L** 17–22	3–6–1	FirstEnergy Stadium	Recap
12	November 30	Seattle Seahawks	**L** 17–23	3–7–1	Lincoln Financial Field	Recap
13	December 6	at Green Bay Packers	**L** 16–30	3–8–1	Lambeau Field	Recap
14	December 13	New Orleans Saints	**W** 24–21	4–8–1	Lincoln Financial Field	Recap
15	December 20	at Arizona Cardinals	**L** 26–33	4–9–1	State Farm Stadium	Recap
16	December 27	at **Dallas Cowboys**	**L** 17–37	4–10–1	AT&T Stadium	Recap
17	January 3	**Washington Football Team**	**L** 14–20	4–11–1	Lincoln Financial Field	Recap

Note: Intra-division opponents are in bold text.

=== Game summaries ===
==== Week 1: at Washington Football Team ====
Week One: Philadelphia Eagles at Washington Football Team – Game summary

Quarter	1	2	3	4	Total
Eagles	10	7	0	0	**17**
**Washington**	0	7	7	13	**27**

at FedEx Field, Landover, Maryland

- Date: September 13
- Game time: 1:00 p.m. EDT
- Game weather: Cloudy, 76 °F (24 °C)
- Game attendance: 0
- Referee: Brad Rogers
- TV announcers (Fox): Kevin Burkhardt, Daryl Johnston and Pam Oliver
- Recap, Game Book

Game information

**First quarter**

- PHI – Zach Ertz 5-yard pass from Carson Wentz (Jake Elliott kick), 11:14. Eagles 7–0. **Drive: 6 plays, 62 yards, 2:27.**
- PHI – Jake Elliott 38-yard field goal, 2:13. Eagles 10–0. **Drive: 11 plays, 76 yards, 6:45.**

**Second quarter**

- PHI – Dallas Goedert 34-yard pass from Carson Wentz (Jake Elliott kick), 6:54. Eagles 17–0. **Drive: 6 plays, 62 yards, 2:30.**
- WAS – Logan Thomas 6-yard pass from Dwayne Haskins (Dustin Hopkins kick), 0:40. Eagles 17–7. **Drive: 5 plays, 45 yards, 0:57.**

**Third quarter**

- WAS – Peyton Barber 1-yard run (Dustin Hopkins kick), 9:25. Eagles 17–14. **Drive: 5 plays, 20 yards, 2:19.**

**Fourth quarter**

- WAS – Dustin Hopkins 38-yard field goal, 14:15. Tied 17–17. **Drive: 5 plays, 26 yards, 1:58.**
- WAS – Peyton Barber 3-yard run (Dustin Hopkins kick), 6:13. Football Team 24–17. **Drive: 13 plays, 48 yards, 6:14.**
- WAS – Dustin Hopkins 40-yard field goal, 3:25. Football Team 27–17. **Drive: 5 plays, 20 yards, 1:06.**

**Top passers**

- PHI – Carson Wentz – 24/42, 270 yards, 2 TD, 2 INT
- WAS – Dwayne Haskins – 17/31, 178 yards, TD

**Top rushers**

- PHI – Boston Scott – 9 rushes, 35 yards
- WAS – Antonio Gibson – 9 rushes, 36 yards

**Top receivers**

- PHI – Dallas Goedert – 8 receptions, 101 yards, TD
- WAS – Terry McLaurin – 5 receptions, 61 yards

In a near-reversal of the previous season's opener, the Eagles scored the first 17 points, only for the Washington Football Team to then shut their offense out for the remainder of the afternoon. Meanwhile, Washington's offense scored 27 unanswered points, and the defense sacked Carson Wentz eight times, recorded two interceptions, and forced three fumbles.

With the loss, Philadelphia's six-game winning streak against Washington dating back to 2016 came to an end, and the Eagles lost the first game of the season for the first time since 2015.

==== Week 2: vs. Los Angeles Rams ====
Week Two: Los Angeles Rams at Philadelphia Eagles – Game summary

Quarter	1	2	3	4	Total
**Rams**	14	7	3	13	**37**
Eagles	3	13	0	3	**19**

at Lincoln Financial Field, Philadelphia, Pennsylvania

- Date: September 20
- Game time: 1:00 pm. EDT
- Game weather: Sunny, 62 °F (17 °C)
- Game attendance: 0
- Referee: Brad Allen
- TV announcers (Fox): Kevin Kugler, Chris Spielman and Laura Okmin
- Recap, Game Book

Game information

**First quarter**

- LAR – Tyler Higbee 4-yard pass from Jared Goff (Sam Sloman kick), 11:15. Rams 7–0. **Drive: 5 plays, 41 yards, 2:22.**
- PHI – Jake Elliott 38-yard field goal, 6:42. Rams 7–3. **Drive: 9 plays, 50 yards, 4:33.**
- LAR – Robert Woods 5-yard run (Sam Sloman kick), 1:48. Rams 14–3. **Drive: 10 plays, 75 yards, 4:54.**

**Second quarter**

- LAR – Tyler Higbee 3-yard pass from Jared Goff (Sam Sloman kick), 12:15. Rams 21–3. **Drive: 8 plays, 80 yards, 3:32.**
- PHI – Carson Wentz 1-yard run (run failed), 6:10. Rams 21–9. **Drive: 11 plays, 75 yards, 6:05.**
- PHI – Miles Sanders 5-yard run (Jake Elliott kick), 0:35. Rams 21–16. **Drive: 2 plays, 11 yards, 0:11.**

**Third quarter**

- LAR – Sam Sloman 30-yard field goal, 2:14. Rams 24–16. **Drive: 16 plays, 68 yards, 5:49.**

**Fourth quarter**

- PHI – Jake Elliott 33-yard field goal, 12:07. Rams 24–19. **Drive: 13 plays, 60 yards, 5:07.**
- LAR – Tyler Higbee 28-yard pass from Jared Goff (Sam Sloman kick), 10:53. Rams 31–19. **Drive: 3 plays, 75 yards, 1:14.**
- LAR – Darrell Henderson 2-yard run (kick blocked), 3:37. Rams 37–19. **Drive: 9 plays, 64 yards, 4:11.**

**Top passers**

- LAR – Jared Goff – 20/27, 267 yards, 3 TD
- PHI – Carson Wentz – 26/43, 242 yards, 2 INT

**Top rushers**

- LAR – Darrell Henderson – 12 rushes, 81 yards, TD
- PHI – Miles Sanders – 20 rushes, 95 yards, TD

**Top receivers**

- LAR – Cooper Kupp – 5 receptions, 81 yards
- PHI – DeSean Jackson – 6 receptions, 64 yards

The Eagles' struggles continued in their home opener against the Los Angeles Rams. An early fumble by Miles Sanders led to a Rams touchdown by Tyler Higbee. After the Eagles cut their deficit to four with a Jake Elliott field goal, Los Angeles responded with a Robert Woods touchdown run followed by a second Higbee touchdown catch. Trailing 21–3, the Eagles closed the deficit to five points by halftime with touchdown runs by Wentz and Sanders. After forcing a three-and-out on the Rams' first possession of the second half, the Eagles would drive to the Los Angeles 21, only for Wentz's first down pass to be picked off by Darious Williams, turning the momentum back in the Rams' favor as they would outscore the Eagles 16–3 the rest of the way. Despite not being sacked once during the game, Wentz finished the day with a 56.5 passer rating, completing 26 of 43 passes for 242 yards and two interceptions.

The 37–19 blowout loss dropped Philadelphia to 0–2 for the first time since 2015, and marked the Eagles' first home opener loss since that same season. It was also the first home loss to the Rams franchise since 2001.

==== Week 3: vs. Cincinnati Bengals ====
Week Three: Cincinnati Bengals at Philadelphia Eagles – Game summary

Quarter	1	2	3	4	OT	Total
Bengals	0	10	7	6	0	**23**
Eagles	0	13	3	7	0	**23**

at Lincoln Financial Field, Philadelphia, Pennsylvania

- Date: September 27
- Game time: 1:00 pm. EDT
- Game weather: Cloudy, 76 °F (24 °C)
- Game attendance: 0
- Referee: Adrian Hill
- TV announcers (CBS): Spero Dedes and Adam Archuleta
- Recap, Game Book

Game information

**First quarter**

- No scoring plays.

**Second quarter**

- PHI – Jake Elliott 27-yard field goal, 14:57. Eagles 3–0. **Drive: 16 plays, 82 yards, 6:59.**
- CIN – Randy Bullock 48-yard field goal, 7:33. Tied 3–3. **Drive: 4 plays, 8 yards, 1:17.**
- PHI – Jake Elliott 42-yard field goal, 2:47. Eagles 6–3. **Drive: 10 plays, 51 yards, 4:46.**
- CIN – Tee Higgins 1-yard pass from Joe Burrow (Randy Bullock kick), 1:29. Bengals 10–6. **Drive: 8 plays, 75 yards, 1:18.**
- PHI – Greg Ward 29-yard pass from Carson Wentz (Jake Elliott kick), 0:16. Eagles 13–10. **Drive: 5 plays, 60 yards, 1:13.**

**Third quarter**

- PHI – Jake Elliott 54-yard field goal, 8:39. Eagles 16–10. **Drive: 10 plays, 39 yards, 6:21.**
- CIN – Tee Higgins 4-yard pass from Joe Burrow (Randy Bullock kick), 2:22. Bengals 17–16. **Drive: 10 plays, 76 yards, 6:17.**

**Fourth quarter**

- CIN – Randy Bullock 31-yard field goal, 14:52. Bengals 20–16. **Drive: 7 plays, 31 yards, 1:53.**
- CIN – Randy Bullock 25-yard field goal, 3:05. Bengals 23–16. **Drive: 12 plays, 81 yards, 6:59.**
- PHI – Carson Wentz 7-yard run (Jake Elliott kick), 0:21. Tied 23–23. **Drive: 11 plays, 75 yards, 2:44.**

**Overtime** No scoring plays.

**Top passers**

- CIN – Joe Burrow – 31/44, 312 yards, 2 TD
- PHI – Carson Wentz – 29/47, 225 yards, TD, 2 INT

**Top rushers**

- CIN – Joe Mixon – 17 rushes, 49 yards
- PHI – Miles Sanders – 18 rushes, 95 yards

**Top receivers**

- CIN – Tyler Boyd – 10 receptions, 125 yards
- PHI – Greg Ward – 8 receptions, 72 yards, TD

The Eagles welcomed the Cincinnati Bengals to Lincoln Financial Field seeking their first win over Cincinnati since 2000. After a scoreless first quarter, the two teams traded field goals in the second, before the Bengals took a 10–6 lead on a touchdown reception by Tee Higgins. Wentz responded on the ensuing drive, as he threw his 100th career touchdown pass to Greg Ward to put the Eagles in front 13–10 at halftime. After the Eagles added another Jake Elliott field goal, the Bengals reclaimed a one-point lead with Higgins' second touchdown of the afternoon. Cincinnati would pad its lead to seven points with two fourth-quarter field goals. Trailing 23–16 with just over 3 minutes left in regulation, Philadelphia drove down the field to score the game-tying touchdown on a 7-yard run for Wentz. In overtime, both defenses held strong, with neither team being able to get into field goal range until the final drive, when the Eagles got to the Bengals' 41. However, a costly false start on Matt Pryor brought Philadelphia out of field goal range. The Eagles punted the ball, and the game ended on the following play with the Bengals at their own 20. Despite his milestone, Wentz's struggles continued as he also threw two interceptions for the third straight game and finished the game with a 62.8 passer rating. Philadelphia improved to 0–2–1 with the tie, but failed to snap their winless streak against Cincinnati and fell to 0–3–2 in their last five against the Bengals, including an 0–2–1 mark at Lincoln Financial Field. This marked the Eagles' first tie since 2008, which was also against the Bengals.

==== Week 4: at San Francisco 49ers ====
Week Four: Philadelphia Eagles at San Francisco 49ers – Game summary

Quarter	1	2	3	4	Total
**Eagles**	8	0	3	14	**25**
49ers	7	0	7	6	**20**

at Levi's Stadium, Santa Clara, California

- Date: October 4
- Game time: 8:20 pm. EDT/5:20 p.m. PDT
- Game weather: Sunny, 84 °F (29 °C)
- Game attendance: 0
- Referee: Bill Vinovich
- TV announcers (NBC): Al Michaels, Cris Collinsworth and Michele Tafoya
- Recap, Game Book

Game information

**First quarter**

- PHI – Carson Wentz 11-yard run (Carson Wentz–Zach Ertz pass), 3:51. Eagles 8–0. **Drive: 8 plays, 78 yards, 4:03.**
- SF – Brandon Aiyuk 38-yard run (Robbie Gould kick), 0:21. Eagles 8–7. **Drive: 6 plays, 75 yards, 3:30.**

**Second quarter**

- No scoring plays.

**Third quarter**

- SF – George Kittle 5-yard pass from Nick Mullens (Robbie Gould kick), 8:26. 49ers 14–8. **Drive: 12 plays, 75 yards, 6:34.**
- PHI – Jake Elliott 35-yard field goal, 0:55. 49ers 14–11. **Drive: 16 plays, 62 yards, 7:31.**

**Fourth quarter**

- PHI – Travis Fulgham 42-yard pass from Carson Wentz (Jake Elliott kick), 5:50. Eagles 18–14. **Drive: 12 plays, 75 yards, 6:34.**
- PHI – Alex Singleton 30-yard interception return (Jake Elliott kick), 5:42. Eagles 25–14.
- SF – Jerick McKinnon 1-yard run (pass failed), 2:02. Eagles 25–20. **Drive: 12 plays, 75 yards, 3:40.**

**Top passers**

- PHI – Carson Wentz – 18/28, 193 yards, TD, INT
- SF – Nick Mullens – 18/26, 200 yards, TD, 2 INT

**Top rushers**

- PHI – Miles Sanders – 13 rushes, 46 yards
- SF – Jerick McKinnon – 14 rushes, 54 yards, TD

**Top receivers**

- PHI – Travis Fulgham – 2 receptions, 57 yards, TD
- SF – George Kittle – 15 receptions, 183 yards, TD

A depleted Eagles team stunned the 49ers on Sunday Night Football to win their first game of the season. Unknown wide receiver Travis Fulgham signed a 1-year contract before the game and caught a key go-ahead score in the 3rd quarter. Linebacker Alex Singleton also scored a touchdown on an interception which proved to be the decider.

==== Week 5: at Pittsburgh Steelers ====
Week Five: Philadelphia Eagles at Pittsburgh Steelers – Game summary

Quarter	1	2	3	4	Total
Eagles	7	7	8	7	**29**
**Steelers**	7	10	14	7	**38**

at Heinz Field, Pittsburgh, Pennsylvania

- Date: October 11
- Game time: 1:00 pm. EDT
- Game weather: Cloudy, 70 °F (21 °C)
- Game attendance: 4,708
- Referee: Ronald Torbert
- TV announcers (Fox): Kenny Albert, Jonathan Vilma and Shannon Spake
- Recap, Game Book

Game information

**First quarter**

- PIT – Chase Claypool 2-yard run, (Chris Boswell kick) 1:04. Steelers 7–0. **Drive: 14 plays, 62 yards, 7:07.**
- PHI – Miles Sanders 74-yard run (Chris Boswell kick), 0:07. Tied 7–7. **Drive: 3 plays, 75 yards, 0:57.**

**Second quarter**

- PIT – Chase Claypool 32-yard pass from Ben Roethlisberger (Chris Boswell kick), 11:49. Steelers 14–7. **Drive: 7 plays, 75 yards, 3:18.**
- PHI – Miles Sanders 1-yard run (Jake Elliott kick), 6:17. Tied 14–14. **Drive: 10 plays, 76 yards, 5:32.**
- PIT – Chris Boswell 41-yard field goal, 1:57. Steelers 17–14. **Drive: 8 plays, 52 yards, 4:20.**

**Third quarter**

- PIT – Chase Claypool 5-yard pass from Ben Roethlisberger (Chris Boswell kick), 13:01. Steelers 24–14. **Drive: 6 plays, 75 yards, 1:59.**
- PIT – James Conner 1-yard run (Chris Boswell kick), 10:32. Steelers 31–14. **Drive: 4 plays, 23 yards, 2:12.**
- PHI – Greg Ward 8-yard pass from Carson Wentz (Carson Wentz–John Hightower pass), 5:58. Steelers 31–22. **Drive: 7 plays, 75 yards, 4:34**

**Fourth quarter**

- PHI – Travis Fulgham 4-yard pass from Carson Wentz (Jake Elliott kick), 11:27. Steelers 31–29. **Drive: 10 plays, 80 yards, 5:27.**
- PIT – Chase Claypool 35-yard pass from Ben Roethlisberger (Chris Boswell kick), 2:59. Steelers 38–29. **Drive: 4 plays, 53 yards, 0:19.**

**Top scorers**

- PHI – Carson Wentz – 20/35, 258 yards, 2 TD, 2 INT
- PIT – Ben Roethlisberger – 27/34, 239 yards, 3 TD

**Top passers**

- PHI – Miles Sanders – 11 rushes, 80 yards, 2 TD
- PIT – Ray-Ray McCloud – 2 rushes, 63 yards

**Top receivers**

- PHI – Travis Fulgham – 10 receptions, 152 yards, TD
- PIT – Chase Claypool – 7 receptions, 110 yards, 3 TD

After being the hero the previous week, Travis Fulgham had a breakout game with 10 receptions for 152 yards and a touchdown, but was outperformed by Steelers rookie wide receiver Chase Claypool, who scored 4 total touchdowns, 3 receiving, from 7 catches and 110 yards. The loss dropped the Eagles to 1–3–1.

==== Week 6: vs. Baltimore Ravens ====
Week Six: Baltimore Ravens at Philadelphia Eagles – Game summary

Quarter	1	2	3	4	Total
**Ravens**	14	3	7	6	**30**
Eagles	0	0	6	22	**28**

at Lincoln Financial Field, Philadelphia, Pennsylvania

- Date: October 18
- Game time: 1:00 pm. EDT
- Game weather: Sunny, 61 °F (16 °C)
- Game attendance: 7,500
- Referee: Shawn Smith
- TV announcers (CBS): Ian Eagle, Charles Davis and Evan Washburn
- Recap, Game Book

Game information

**First quarter**

- BAL – Nick Boyle 7-yard pass from Lamar Jackson (Justin Tucker kick), 8:02. Ravens 7–0. **Drive: 9 plays, 47 yards, 5:13.**
- BAL – Gus Edwards 7-yard run (Justin Tucker kick), 0:31. Ravens 14–0. **Drive: 5 plays, 28 yards, 2:23.**

**Second quarter**

- BAL – Justin Tucker 46-yard field goal, 12:08. Ravens 17–0. **Drive: 5 plays, 35 yards, 2:00.**

**Third quarter**

- PHI – J. J. Arcega-Whiteside fumble recovery in end zone (run failed), 7:17. Ravens 17–6. **Drive: 2 plays, 86 yards, 0:53.**
- BAL – Lamar Jackson 37-yard run (Justin Tucker kick), 4:25. Ravens 24–6. **Drive: 5 plays, 63 yards, 2:52.**

**Fourth quarter**

- PHI – Jason Croom 3-yard pass from Carson Wentz (Carson Wentz–Greg Ward pass), 13:32. Ravens 24–14. **Drive: 12 plays, 81 yards, 3:04.**
- BAL – Justin Tucker 55-yard field goal, 10:01. Ravens 27–14. **Drive: 7 plays, 38 yards, 3:31.**
- BAL – Justin Tucker 46-yard field goal, 7:12. Ravens 30–14. **Drive: 4 plays, 2 yards, 2:07.**
- PHI – Travis Fulgham 18-yard pass from Carson Wentz (Carson Wentz–J. J. Arcega-Whiteside pass), 3:48. Ravens 30–22. **Drive: 11 plays, 75 yards, 3:24.**
- PHI – Carson Wentz 1-yard run (run failed), 1:55. Ravens 30–28. **Drive: 4 plays, 71 yards, 1:16.**

**Top passers**

- BAL – Lamar Jackson – 16/27, 186 yards, TD
- PHI – Carson Wentz – 21/40, 213 yards, 2 TD

**Top rushers**

- BAL – Lamar Jackson – 9 rushes, 108 yards, TD
- PHI – Miles Sanders – 9 rushes, 118 yards

**Top receivers**

- BAL – Marquise Brown – 4 receptions, 57 yards
- PHI – Travis Fulgham – 6 receptions, 75 yards, TD

After falling behind 17–0 in the first half, the Eagles surged back with a dominant second half to pull within two points of the Ravens in the fourth quarter. However, the furious rally came up short as Carson Wentz was stopped on a would-be game-tying two-point conversion in the final two minutes. Baltimore recovered the ensuing onside kick and ran out the clock to seal the narrow 30–28 loss. With their second straight defeat, Philadelphia dropped to 1–4–1 on the season. This was the first game in the 2020 season where Carson Wentz did not throw an interception and he was praised with the near 4th quarter comeback.

==== Week 7: vs. New York Giants ====
Week Seven: New York Giants at Philadelphia Eagles – Game summary

Quarter	1	2	3	4	Total
Giants	7	0	7	7	**21**
**Eagles**	7	3	0	12	**22**

at Lincoln Financial Field, Philadelphia, Pennsylvania

- Date: October 22
- Game time: 8:20 pm. EDT
- Game weather: Clear, 70 °F (21 °C)
- Game attendance: 7,500
- Referee: Adrian Hill
- TV announcers (Fox/NFLN/Amazon Prime): Joe Buck, Troy Aikman, Erin Andrews and Kristina Pink
- Recap, Game Book

Game information

**First quarter**

- PHI – Carson Wentz 1-yard run (Jake Elliott kick), 8:45. Eagles 7–0. **Drive: 11 plays, 75 yards, 6:15.**
- NYG – Golden Tate 39-yard pass from Daniel Jones (Graham Gano kick), 4:13. Tied 7–7. **Drive: 1 play, 39 yards, 0:07.**

**Second quarter**

- PHI – Jake Elliott 31-yard field goal, 13:28. Eagles 10–7. **Drive: 13 plays, 57 yards, 5:45.**

**Third quarter**

- NYG – Wayne Gallman 1-yard run (Graham Gano kick), 6:45. Giants 14–10. **Drive: 4 plays, 88 yards, 2:06.**

**Fourth quarter**

- NYG – Sterling Shepard 2-yard pass from Daniel Jones (Graham Gano kick), 6:17. Giants 21–10. **Drive: 15 plays, 97 yards, 7:50.**
- PHI – Greg Ward 3-yard pass from Carson Wentz (run failed), 4:38. Giants 21–16. **Drive: 4 plays, 78 yards, 1:39.**
- PHI – Boston Scott 18-yard pass from Carson Wentz (pass failed), 0:40. Eagles 22–21. **Drive: 6 plays, 71 yards, 1:22.**

**Top passers**

- NYG – Daniel Jones – 20/30, 187 yards, 2 TD, INT
- PHI – Carson Wentz – 25/43, 359 yards, 2 TD, INT

**Top rushers**

- NYG – Daniel Jones – 4 rushes, 92 yards
- PHI – Boston Scott – 12 rushes, 46 yards

**Top receivers**

- NYG – Sterling Shepard – 6 receptions, 59 yards, TD
- PHI – Richard Rodgers – 6 receptions, 85 yards

The Eagles recovered from a 21–10 hole. They scored 12 unanswered points and reclaimed first place in the NFC East when Boston Scott caught a game-winning touchdown pass and linebacker Brandon Graham forced a fumble on Giants quarterback Daniel Jones. This win improved the Eagles to 2–4–1. They extended their all-time series lead to 89–86–2.

==== Week 8: vs. Dallas Cowboys ====
Week Eight: Dallas Cowboys at Philadelphia Eagles – Game summary

Quarter	1	2	3	4	Total
Cowboys	3	6	0	0	**9**
**Eagles**	7	0	8	8	**23**

at Lincoln Financial Field, Philadelphia, Pennsylvania

- Date: November 1
- Game time: 8:20 pm. EST
- Game weather: Cloudy, 49 °F (9 °C)
- Game attendance: 7,500
- Referee: Jerome Boger
- TV announcers (NBC): Al Michaels, Cris Collinsworth, Michele Tafoya and Terry McAulay
- Recap, Game Book

Game information

**First quarter**

- DAL – Greg Zuerlein 49-yard field goal, 10:11. Cowboys 3–0. **Drive: 9 plays, 47 yards, 4:49.**
- PHI – Jalen Reagor 2-yard pass from Carson Wentz (Jake Elliott kick), 0:02. Eagles 7–3. **Drive: 10 plays, 83 yards, 5:46.**

**Second quarter**

- DAL – Greg Zuerlein 49-yard field goal, 9:46. Eagles 7–6. **Drive: 6 plays, 15 yards, 1:44.**
- DAL – Greg Zuerlein 59-yard field goal, 0:06. Cowboys 9–7. **Drive: 5 plays, 14 yards, 0:23.**

**Third quarter**

- PHI – Travis Fulgham 9-yard pass from Carson Wentz (Carson Wentz-Jalen Reagor pass), 1:54. Eagles 15–9. **Drive: 9 plays, 58 yards, 4:19.**

**Fourth quarter**

- PHI – Rodney McLeod 53-yard fumble return (run failed), 5:18. Eagles 21–9.
- PHI – L. P. Ladouceur fumble out of bounds in the end zone for a Safety, 3:55. Eagles 23–9. **Drive: 9 plays, 58 yards, 4:19.**

**Top passers**

- DAL – Ben DiNucci – 21/40, 180 yards
- PHI – Carson Wentz – 15/27, 123 yards, 2 TD, 2 INT

**Top rushers**

- DAL – Ezekiel Elliott – 19 rushes, 63 yards
- PHI – Boston Scott – 15 rushes, 70 yards

**Top receivers**

- DAL – Michael Gallup – 7 receptions, 61 yards
- PHI – Travis Fulgham – 6 receptions, 78 yards, TD

Despite committing four turnovers and being held to a season-low seven first half points, Wentz and the Eagles bumbled their way to a crucial division win over an injury-ravaged Dallas Cowboys team led by rookie quarterback Ben DiNucci. The Cowboys opened the scoring on the game's opening drive with a 49-yard field goal by Greg Zuerlein. After a fumble by Wentz gave the Cowboys the ball back, the Eagles regained possession on a DiNucci fumble and took a 7–3 lead on Jalen Reagor's first career touchdown reception. The Cowboys responded with another Zuerlein field goal following Wentz's second fumble, and took a 9–7 halftime lead on a 59-yard field goal (mirroring the halftime score in Dallas in 2017, also played on Sunday Night Football). On the Eagles' second-half opening drive, Wentz would be picked off by Cowboys rookie cornerback Trevon Diggs, who returned the ball to the Dallas 31, but the Cowboys failed to capitalize when Zuerlein's ensuing 52-yard field goal attempt sailed wide right. The Eagles used the momentum swing to regain the lead 15–9 on a 9-yard Travis Fulgham touchdown reception. In the fourth quarter, T. J. Edwards strip-sacked DiNucci, and the ensuing fumble was recovered and returned 53 yards for a touchdown by Rodney McLeod. With the 23–9 win, Philadelphia improved to 3–4–1 on the season heading into their Week 9 bye.

==== Week 10: at New York Giants ====
Week Ten: Philadelphia Eagles at New York Giants – Game summary

Quarter	1	2	3	4	Total
Eagles	3	0	14	0	**17**
**Giants**	7	7	7	6	**27**

at MetLife Stadium, East Rutherford, New Jersey

- Date: November 15
- Game time: 1:00 pm. EST
- Game weather: Mostly cloudy, 56 °F (13 °C)
- Game attendance: 0
- Referee: Clay Martin
- TV announcers (Fox): Kevin Kugler, Chris Spielman and Laura Okmin
- Recap, Game Book

Game information

**First quarter**

- NYG – Daniel Jones 34-yard run (Graham Gano kick), 11:11. Giants 7–0. **Drive: 8 plays, 85 yards, 3:49.**
- PHI – Jake Elliott 40-yard field goal, 6:27. Giants 7–3. **Drive: 12 plays, 53 yards, 4:44.**

**Second quarter**

- NYG – Wayne Gallman 2-yard run (Graham Gano kick), 14:57. Giants 14–3. **Drive: 13 plays, 75 yards, 6:30.**

**Third quarter**

- PHI – Boston Scott 56-yard run (Miles Sanders run), 12:31. Giants 14–11. **Drive: 5 plays, 84 yards, 2:29.**
- NYG – Wayne Gallman 1-yard run (Graham Gano kick), 9:49. Giants 21–11. **Drive: 6 plays, 75 yards, 2:42.**
- PHI – Corey Clement 5-yard run (pass failed), 5:20. Giants 21–17. **Drive: 8 plays, 75 yards, 4:29.**

**Fourth quarter**

- NYG – Graham Gano 35-yard field goal, 7:45. Giants 24–17. **Drive: 6 plays, 24 yards, 3:17.**
- NYG – Graham Gano 44-yard field goal, 3:06. Giants 27–17. **Drive: 6 plays, 38 yards, 1:46.**

**Top passers**

- PHI – Carson Wentz – 21/37, 208 yards
- NYG – Daniel Jones – 21/28, 244 yards

**Top rushers**

- PHI – Miles Sanders – 15 rushes, 85 yards
- NYG – Daniel Jones – 9 rushes, 64 yards, TD

**Top receivers**

- PHI – Richard Rodgers – 4 receptions, 60 yards
- NYG – Darius Slayton – 5 receptions, 93 yards

The Eagles came stumbling out of the bye week and suffered their first loss to the Giants since Week 9 of the 2016 season, ending an eight-game winning streak against New York. The Eagles also fell to 1–4 after the bye in the Doug Pederson era. This left many fans and media questioning Pederson's play calling creativity. Despite a subpar performance from Wentz, he played his first turnover free game of 2020. The Eagles fell to 3–5–1, but nonetheless remained in first place in a lowly NFC East. The all-time series fell to 89–87–2.

==== Week 11: at Cleveland Browns ====
Week Eleven: Philadelphia Eagles at Cleveland Browns – Game summary

Quarter	1	2	3	4	Total
Eagles	0	0	7	10	**17**
**Browns**	0	7	5	10	**22**

at FirstEnergy Stadium, Cleveland, Ohio

- Date: November 22
- Game time: 1:00 pm. EST
- Game weather: Rain, 38 °F (3 °C)
- Game attendance: 11,133
- Referee: Adrian Hill
- TV announcers (Fox): Adam Amin, Mark Schlereth and Lindsay Czarniak
- Recap, Game Book

Game information

**First quarter**

- No scoring plays.

**Second quarter**

- CLE – Sione Takitaki 50-yard interception return (Cody Parkey kick), 13:35. Browns 7–0.

**Third quarter**

- PHI – Richard Rodgers 19-yard pass from Carson Wentz (Jake Elliott kick), 11:53. Tied 7–7. **Drive: 1 play, 19 yards, 0:06.**
- CLE – Cody Parkey 46-yard field goal, 8:59. Browns 10–7. **Drive: 5 plays, 47 yards, 2:54.**
- CLE – Carson Wentz sacked in the end zone by Olivier Vernon, 3:11. Browns 12–7.

**Fourth quarter**

- PHI – Jake Elliott 43-yard field goal, 11:24. Browns 12–10. **Drive: 7 plays, 38 yards, 2:30.**
- CLE – Kareem Hunt 5-yard run (Cody Parkey kick), 9:13. Browns 19–10. **Drive: 4 plays, 79 yards, 2:11.**
- CLE – Cody Parkey 28-yard field goal, 3:49. Browns 22–10. **Drive: 10 plays, 43 yards, 4:32.**
- PHI – Dallas Goedert 4-yard pass from Carson Wentz (Jake Elliott kick), 0:30. Browns 22–17. **Drive: 8 plays, 47 yards, 1:09.**

**Top passers**

- PHI – Carson Wentz – 21/35, 235 yards, 2 TD, 2 INT
- CLE – Baker Mayfield – 12/22, 204 yards

**Top rushers**

- PHI – Miles Sanders – 16 rushes, 66 yards
- CLE – Nick Chubb – 20 rushes, 114 yards

**Top receivers**

- PHI – Dallas Goedert – 5 receptions, 77 yards, TD
- CLE – KhaDarel Hodge – 3 receptions, 73 yards

In heavy rain and wind, the Eagles would lose a defensive game. Wentz struggled again, throwing 2 interceptions and absorbing 5 sacks, and Sanders lost a fumble, wasting a good effort by the defense against a high-powered Browns offense. This loss dropped the Eagles to 3–6–1.

==== Week 12: vs. Seattle Seahawks ====
Week Twelve: Seattle Seahawks at Philadelphia Eagles – Game summary

Quarter	1	2	3	4	Total
**Seahawks**	0	14	3	6	**23**
Eagles	0	6	3	8	**17**

at Lincoln Financial Field, Philadelphia, Pennsylvania

- Date: November 30
- Game time: 8:15 pm. EST
- Game weather: Rain, 60 °F (16 °C)
- Game attendance: 0
- Referee: Brad Allen
- TV announcers (ESPN): Steve Levy, Brian Griese, Louis Riddick, Lisa Salters and John Parry
- Recap, Game Book

Game information

**First quarter**

- No scoring plays.

**Second quarter**

- SEA – David Moore 1-yard pass from Russell Wilson (Jason Myers kick), 10:56. Seahawks 7–0. **Drive: 6 plays, 68 yards, 2:45.**
- SEA – Chris Carson 16-yard run (Jason Myers kick), 5:27. Seahawks 14–0. **Drive: 8 plays, 66 yards, 3:58.**
- PHI – Dallas Goedert 3-yard pass from Carson Wentz (kick failed), 0:12. Seahawks 14–6. **Drive: 16 plays, 75 yards, 5:15.**

**Third quarter**

- PHI – Jake Elliott 42-yard field goal, 7:33. Seahawks 14–9. **Drive: 12 plays, 48 yards, 5:55.**
- SEA – Jason Myers 44-yard field goal, 2:06. Seahawks 17–9. **Drive: 9 plays, 52 yards, 5:21.**

**Fourth quarter**

- SEA – Jason Myers 33-yard field goal, 11:08. Seahawks 20–9. **Drive: 6 plays, 33 yards, 2:22.**
- SEA – Jason Myers 39-yard field goal, 1:13. Seahawks 23–9. **Drive: 4 plays, 4 yards, 1:01.**
- PHI – Richard Rodgers 32-yard pass from Carson Wentz (Miles Sanders run), 0:12. Seahawks 23–17. **Drive: 4 plays, 58 yards, 0:23.**

**Top passers**

- SEA – Russell Wilson – 22/31, 230 yards, TD
- PHI – Carson Wentz – 25/45, 214 yards, 2 TD, INT

**Top rushers**

- SEA – Chris Carson – 8 rushes, 41 yards, TD
- PHI – Carson Wentz – 5 rushes, 42 yards

**Top receivers**

- SEA – DK Metcalf – 10 receptions, 177 yards
- PHI – Dallas Goedert – 7 receptions, 75 yards, TD

The Eagles returned home to face the Seattle Seahawks behind closed doors. Philadelphia entered the game winless against Seattle in the Russell Wilson era with an 0–5 record. After a scoreless first quarter, the Seahawks would jump to a 14-point lead on touchdowns by David Moore and Chris Carson. A drive led by Carson Wentz at the end of the first half would put the Eagles on the board, but the Seahawks would not relinquish their lead for the remainder of the game. A garbage time Hail Mary from Wentz to Richard Rodgers pulled the Eagles within 6 points, but the Seahawks recovered the ensuing onside kick to seal Philadelphia's third straight loss. This touchdown would be Wentz's last in an Eagles uniform. The Eagles fell to 3–7–1 on the season, 0–6 against Russell Wilson, 0–7 against Pete Carroll, and 0–6 at Lincoln Financial Field against the Seahawks with the 23–17 loss.

==== Week 13: at Green Bay Packers ====
Week Thirteen: Philadelphia Eagles at Green Bay Packers – Game summary

Quarter	1	2	3	4	Total
Eagles	3	0	0	13	**16**
**Packers**	0	14	6	10	**30**

at Lambeau Field, Green Bay, Wisconsin

- Date: December 6
- Game time: 4:25 pm. EST/3:25 p.m. CST
- Game weather: Cloudy, 34 °F (1 °C)
- Game attendance: 0
- Referee: Bill Vinovich
- TV announcers (CBS): Jim Nantz, Tony Romo and Tracy Wolfson
- Recap, Game Book

Game information

**First quarter**

- PHI – Jake Elliott 52-yard field goal, 7:53. Eagles 3–0. **Drive: 15 plays, 46 yards, 7:07.**

**Second quarter**

- GB – Davante Adams 1-yard pass from Aaron Rodgers (Mason Crosby kick), 8:29. Packers 7–3. **Drive: 14 plays, 88 yards, 7:42.**
- GB – Robert Tonyan 25-yard pass from Aaron Rodgers (Mason Crosby kick), 0:57. Packers 14–3. **Drive: 7 plays, 82 yards, 3:46.**

**Third quarter**

- GB – Davante Adams 9-yard pass from Aaron Rodgers, 7:39. Packers 20–3.(kick failed) **Drive: 7 plays, 99 yards, 4:21.**

**Fourth quarter**

- GB – Mason Crosby 40-yard field goal, 11:23. Packers 23–3. **Drive: 6 plays, 72 yards, 7:16.**
- PHI – Greg Ward 32-yard pass from Jalen Hurts (Jake Elliott kick), 7:52. Packers 23–10. **Drive: 9 plays, 83 yards, 3:27.**
- PHI – Jalen Reagor 73-yard punt-return touchdown, 6:30. Packers 23–16.
- GB – Aaron Jones 77-yard run (Mason Crosby kick), 2:36. Packers 30–16. **Drive: 2 plays, 80 yards, 0:21.**

**Top passers**

- PHI – Jalen Hurts – 5/12, 109 yards, TD, INT
- GB – Aaron Rodgers – 25/34, 295 yards, 3 TD

**Top rushers**

- PHI – Miles Sanders – 10 rushes, 31 yards
- GB – Aaron Jones – 15 rushes, 130 yards, TD

**Top receivers**

- PHI – Dallas Goedert – 5 receptions, 66 yards
- GB – Davante Adams – 10 receptions, 121 yards, 2 TD

This game is noted to be the final start for the 2016 number 2 overall pick QB Carson Wentz with the Philadelphia Eagles. With the loss, the Eagles fall to 3–8–1, and have sealed their first losing season since 2016. Carson Wentz was benched in favor for Jalen Hurts after the first drive in the third quarter. On December 8, it was announced Jalen Hurts would get the starting nod in favor of Wentz.

==== Week 14: vs. New Orleans Saints ====
Week Fourteen: New Orleans Saints at Philadelphia Eagles – Game summary

Quarter	1	2	3	4	Total
Saints	0	0	14	7	**21**
**Eagles**	0	17	0	7	**24**

at Lincoln Financial Field, Philadelphia, Pennsylvania

- Date: December 13
- Game time: 4:25 pm. EST
- Game weather: Clear, 57 °F (14 °C)
- Game attendance: 0
- Referee: Jerome Boger
- TV announcers (Fox): Kevin Burkhardt, Daryl Johnston and Pam Oliver
- Recap, Game Book

Game information

**First quarter**

- No scoring plays.

**Second quarter**

- PHI – Alshon Jeffery 15-yard pass from Jalen Hurts (Jake Elliott kick), 13:25. Eagles 7–0. **Drive: 7 plays, 65 yards, 2:33.**
- PHI – Jake Elliott 44-yard field goal, 6:05. Eagles 10–0. **Drive: 4 plays, 6 yards, 0:52.**
- PHI – Miles Sanders 82-yard run (Jake Elliott kick), 1:35. Eagles 17–0. **Drive: 4 plays, 96 yards, 0:38.**

**Third quarter**

- NO – Alvin Kamara 5-yard run (Wil Lutz kick), 7:55. Eagles 17–7. **Drive: 10 plays, 65 yards, 5:07.**
- NO – Emmanuel Sanders 37-yard pass from Taysom Hill (Wil Lutz kick), 1:40. Eagles 17-14. **Drive: 4 plays, 60 yards, 1:23.**

**Fourth quarter**

- PHI – Miles Sanders 1-yard run (Jake Elliott kick), 6:22. Eagles 24–14. **Drive: 6 plays, 53 yards, 3:27.**
- NO – Jared Cook 20-yard pass from Taysom Hill (Wil Lutz kick), 1:24. Eagles 24-21. **Drive: 3 plays, 51 yards, 0:18.**

**Top passers**

- NO – Taysom Hill – 28/38, 291 yards, 2 TD, INT
- PHI – Jalen Hurts – 17/30, 167 yards, TD

**Top rushers**

- NO – Alvin Kamara – 11 rushes, 50 yards, TD
- PHI – Miles Sanders – 14 rushes, 115 yards, 2 TD

**Top receivers**

- NO – Michael Thomas – 8 receptions, 84 yards
- PHI – Jalen Reagor – 2 receptions, 46 yards

Jalen Hurts made his first start in Week 14 as the Eagles stunned the favored Saints and snapped their 9-game winning streak. Hurts and Miles Sanders each ran for over 100 yards on the Saints' top ranked run defense as the Eagles roared out to a 17–0 lead at halftime and were able to hold off a late Saints rally to win 24–21. This was Philadelphia's first win against the Saints since the 2015 season.

==== Week 15: at Arizona Cardinals ====
Week Fifteen: Philadelphia Eagles at Arizona Cardinals – Game summary

Quarter	1	2	3	4	Total
Eagles	0	20	6	0	**26**
**Cardinals**	16	10	0	7	**33**

at State Farm Stadium, Glendale, Arizona

- Date: December 20
- Game time: 4:05 pm. EST/2:05 p.m. MST
- Game weather: Sunny, 66 °F (19 °C) (retractable roof open)
- Game attendance: 0
- Referee: Craig Wrolstad
- TV announcers (Fox): Brandon Gaudin, Aqib Talib and Sara Walsh
- Recap, Game Book

Game information

**First quarter**

- ARI – Penalty on Jalen Hurts enforced in end zone for a Safety, 9:34. Cardinals 2–0.
- ARI – Kyler Murray 8-yard run (Mike Nugent kick), 5:46. Cardinals 9–0. **Drive: 3 plays, 66 yards, 0:57.**
- ARI – Chase Edmonds 6-yard pass from Kyler Murray (Mike Nugent kick), 2:18. Cardinals 16–0. **Drive: 2 plays, 6 yards, 0:08.**

**Second quarter**

- PHI – Quez Watkins 32-yard pass from Jalen Hurts (Jake Elliott kick), 14:01. Cardinals 16–7. **Drive: 7 plays, 74 yards, 3:17.**
- ARI – Mike Nugent 40-yard field goal, 11:37. Cardinals 19–7. **Drive: 5 plays, 53 yards, 2:24.**
- PHI – Greg Ward 4-yard pass from Jalen Hurts (Jake Elliott kick), 6:20. Cardinals 19–14. **Drive: 5 plays, 21 yards, 2:15.**
- ARI – Larry Fitzgerald 14-yard pass from Kyler Murray (Mike Nugent kick), 2:13. Cardinals 26–14. **Drive: 8 plays, 75 yards, 4:07.**
- PHI – Greg Ward 5-yard pass from Jalen Hurts (run failed), 1:19. Cardinals 26–20. **Drive: 7 plays, 78 yards, 0:54.**

**Third quarter**

- PHI – Jalen Hurts 7-yard run (run failed), 0:55. Tied 26–26. **Drive: 9 plays, 80 yards, 4:41.**

**Fourth quarter**

- ARI – DeAndre Hopkins 20-yard pass from Kyler Murray (Mike Nugent kick), 7:17. Cardinals 33–26. **Drive: 7 plays, 86 yards, 3:14.**

**Top passers**

- PHI – Jalen Hurts – 24/44, 338 yards, 3 TD
- ARI – Kyler Murray – 27/36, 406 yards, 3 TD, INT

**Top rushers**

- PHI – Miles Sanders – 17 rushes, 64 yards
- ARI – Chase Edmonds – 11 rushes, 47 yards

**Top receivers**

- PHI – Zach Ertz – 2 receptions, 69 yards
- ARI – DeAndre Hopkins – 9 receptions, 169 yards, TD

Coming off an upset win against the Saints, Jalen Hurts was once again named the starter for Week 15 against the Arizona Cardinals. Despite a slow start, falling behind 16–0 due to a safety and two first quarter touchdowns from Kyler Murray (one of which came off a blocked punt), three-second quarter touchdown passes from Jalen Hurts including 2 to Greg Ward allowed the Eagles to pull within 7 at halftime. The Eagles tied the score at 26 on a 7-yard run by Hurts, however due to an injury to punter Cameron Johnston, Philadelphia was left without a holder. Tight end Zach Ertz served as a backup holder on the extra point attempt, and mishandled a poor snap from long snapper Rick Lovato. Arizona would regain the lead after a successful fake punt, with Murray throwing a go-ahead 20-yard touchdown pass to DeAndre Hopkins. The Eagles attempted a comeback drive with less than 2 minutes left in the 4th quarter but on the final play of the game Jalen Hurts's pass to Goedert was knocked away, sealing the Arizona victory.

With the loss, the Eagles fall to 4–9–1, their most losses in a season since the 2016 season. Doug Pederson announced Monday that Jalen Hurts would start again for week 16 against the Dallas Cowboys.

==== Week 16: at Dallas Cowboys ====
Week Sixteen: Philadelphia Eagles at Dallas Cowboys – Game summary

Quarter	1	2	3	4	Total
Eagles	14	3	0	0	**17**
**Cowboys**	3	17	10	7	**37**

at AT&T Stadium, Arlington, Texas

- Date: December 27
- Game time: 4:25 pm. EST/3:25 pm. CST
- Game weather: 73 °F (23 °C) (retractable roof open)
- Game attendance: 30,131
- Referee: Adrian Hill
- TV announcers (Fox): Kenny Albert, Jonathan Vilma and Shannon Spake
- Recap, Game Book

Game information

**First quarter**

- PHI – Miles Sanders 4-yard run (Jake Elliott kick), 9:00. Eagles 7–0. **Drive: 11 plays, 75 yards, 6:00.**
- DAL – Greg Zuerlein 35-yard field goal, 6:08. Eagles 7–3. **Drive: 6 plays, 58 yards, 2:52.**
- PHI – DeSean Jackson 81-yard pass from Jalen Hurts (Jake Elliott kick), 5:48. Eagles 14–3. **Drive: 1 play, 81 yards, 0:20.**

**Second quarter**

- DAL – Michael Gallup 21-yard pass from Andy Dalton (Greg Zuerlein kick), 13:09. Eagles 14–10. **Drive: 10 plays, 63 yards, 4:15.**
- DAL – Greg Zuerlein 20-yard field goal, 5:53. Eagles 14–13. **Drive: 7 plays, 75 yards, 3:23.**
- PHI – Jake Elliott 38-yard field goal, 2:09. Eagles 17–13. **Drive: 10 plays, 55 yards, 3:44.**
- DAL – Michael Gallup 7-yard pass from Andy Dalton (Greg Zuerlein kick), 0:12. Cowboys 20–17. **Drive: 11 plays, 75 yards, 1:57.**

**Third quarter**

- DAL – CeeDee Lamb 52-yard pass from Andy Dalton (Greg Zuerlein kick), 12:26. Cowboys 27–17. **Drive: 5 plays, 75 yards, 2:34.**
- DAL – Greg Zuerlein 21-yard field goal, 8:31. Cowboys 30–17. **Drive: 6 plays, 80 yards, 2:22.**

**Fourth quarter**

- DAL – CeeDee Lamb 19-yard run (Greg Zuerlein kick), 1:53. Cowboys 37–17. **Drive: 5 plays, 87 yards, 2:01.**

**Top passers**

- PHI – Jalen Hurts – 21/39, 342 yards, TD, 2 INT
- DAL – Andy Dalton – 22/30, 377 yards, 3 TD, INT

**Top rushers**

- PHI – Jalen Hurts – 9 rushes, 69 yards
- DAL – Ezekiel Elliott – 19 rushes, 105 yards

**Top receivers**

- PHI – Quez Watkins – 2 receptions, 57 yards
- DAL – Michael Gallup – 6 receptions, 121 yards, 2 TD

The game began with the Eagles having an eleven-point first quarter lead after two touchdowns. However, the tides would turn in the second quarter, and the Eagles would massively struggle from there, as their defense gave up 513 total yards and 37 points on the evening. Fletcher Cox suffered a stinger injury in the second quarter which would ultimately cost the Eagles their season. Jalen Hurts's poor performance began with turning the ball over three times, one of which led to a Cowboys scoring drive. With the loss, the Eagles dropped to 4–10–1 and were eliminated from playoff contention. They also suffered double digit losses for the first time since the 2012 season.

==== Week 17: vs. Washington Football Team ====
Week Seventeen: Washington Football Team at Philadelphia Eagles – Game summary

Quarter	1	2	3	4	Total
**Washington**	10	7	0	3	**20**
Eagles	0	14	0	0	**14**

at Lincoln Financial Field, Philadelphia, Pennsylvania

- Date: January 3, 2021
- Game time: 8:20 pm. EST
- Game weather: Rain, 38 °F (3 °C)
- Game attendance: 0
- Referee: Ronald Torbert
- TV announcers (NBC): Al Michaels, Cris Collinsworth, Michele Tafoya and Terry McAulay
- Recap, Game Book

Game information

**First quarter**

- WAS – Terry McLaurin 5-yard pass from Alex Smith (Dustin Hopkins kick), 4:19. Football Team 7–0. **Drive: 15 plays, 91 yards, 8:13.**
- WAS – Dustin Hopkins 42-yard field goal, 2:02. Football Team 10–0. **Drive: 4 plays, 8 yards, 2:06.**

**Second quarter**

- PHI – Jalen Hurts 6-yard run (Jake Elliott kick), 10:18. Football Team 10–7. **Drive: 10 plays, 75 yards, 6:44.**
- PHI – Jalen Hurts 6-yard run (Jake Elliott kick), 3:54. Eagles 14–10. **Drive: 7 plays, 65 yards, 4:09.**
- WAS – Logan Thomas 13-yard pass from Alex Smith (Dustin Hopkins kick), 0:20. Football Team 17–14. **Drive: 9 plays, 55 yards, 1:04.**

**Third quarter**

- No scoring plays.

**Fourth quarter**

- WAS – Dustin Hopkins 42-yard field goal, 7:42. Football Team 20–14. **Drive: 4 plays, 1 yard, 1:52.**

**Top passers**

- WAS – Alex Smith – 22/32, 162 yards, 2 TD, 2 INT
- PHI – Jalen Hurts – 7/20, 72 yards, INT

**Top rushers**

- WAS – Antonio Gibson – 19 rushes, 75 yards
- PHI – Boston Scott – 15 rushes, 65 yards

**Top receivers**

- WAS – Cam Sims – 5 receptions, 43 yards
- PHI – J. J. Arcega-Whiteside – 2 receptions, 40 yards

While Philadelphia was already eliminated when this game was conducted, the game was still relevant to the playoffs; if the Eagles won, then the New York Giants would advance as NFC East champions, while if they lost, then Washington would win the NFC East. The game was scheduled as the final game of the regular season to ensure that the televised Sunday night football game would have playoff implications. Despite erasing an early 10-point deficit, the Eagles lost 20–14 to Washington, who clinched the NFC East and the fourth seed as a result. Philadelphia finished with a 4–11–1 overall record, their worst since the 2012 season, and were swept by Washington for the first time since the 2016 season. This loss also secured a last place finish in the NFC East for the first time since 2016. After the game, coach Doug Pederson was criticized for taking out starting quarterback Jalen Hurts in the fourth quarter for a third-string quarterback with the game still in close contention, a move more associated with preseason games that allegedly shocked the Eagles players. Some writers accused Pederson of throwing the game so that the Giants would miss the playoffs, and others accused him of tanking for a better draft spot. Pederson denied the allegations. The Eagles announced Pederson's dismissal eight days later, on January 11. As of 2025, this remains the last time the Eagles missed the playoffs or finished dead last in the NFC East. In addition, this also remains the last time the Eagles failed to beat Washington in a season.

=== Standings ===
==== Division ====
NFC East
	W	L	T	PCT	DIV	CONF	PF	PA	STK
^{(4)} Washington Football Team	7	9	0	.438	4–2	5–7	335	329	W1
New York Giants	6	10	0	.375	4–2	5–7	280	357	W1
Dallas Cowboys	6	10	0	.375	2–4	5–7	395	473	L1
Philadelphia Eagles	4	11	1	.281	2–4	4–8	334	418	L3

==== Conference ====
NFC
#	Team	Division	W	L	T	PCT	DIV	CONF	SOS	SOV	STK
**Division leaders**
1	Green Bay Packers	North	13	3	0	.813	5–1	10–2	.428	.387	W6
2 (Note: New Orleans finished ahead of Seattle based on conference record.)	New Orleans Saints	South	12	4	0	.750	6–0	10–2	.459	.406	W2
3	Seattle Seahawks	West	12	4	0	.750	4–2	9–3	.447	.404	W4
4	Washington Football Team	East	7	9	0	.438	4–2	5–7	.459	.388	W1
**Wild cards**
5	Tampa Bay Buccaneers	South	11	5	0	.688	4–2	8–4	.488	.392	W4
6	Los Angeles Rams	West	10	6	0	.625	3–3	9–3	.494	.484	W1
7 (Note: Chicago finished and clinched the 7th and final playoff spot ahead of Arizona based on better win percentage in common games (against Detroit, the NY Giants, Carolina, and the LA Rams, Chicago finished 3–2, while Arizona finished 1–4).)	Chicago Bears	North	8	8	0	.500	2–4	6–6	.488	.336	L1
**Did not qualify for the postseason**
8	Arizona Cardinals	West	8	8	0	.500	2–4	6–6	.475	.441	L2
9	Minnesota Vikings	North	7	9	0	.438	4–2	5–7	.504	.366	W1
10 (Note: San Francisco finished ahead of the NY Giants based on head-to-head victory. Division tie break was initially used to eliminate Dallas (see below).)	San Francisco 49ers	West	6	10	0	.375	3–3	4–8	.549	.448	L1
11 (Note: NY Giants won tiebreaker over Dallas based on division record.)	New York Giants	East	6	10	0	.375	4–2	5–7	.502	.427	W1
12	Dallas Cowboys	East	6	10	0	.375	2–4	5–7	.471	.333	L1
13 (Note: Carolina finished ahead of Detroit based on head-to-head victory.)	Carolina Panthers	South	5	11	0	.313	1–5	4–8	.531	.388	L1
14	Detroit Lions	North	5	11	0	.313	1–5	4–8	.508	.350	L4
15	Philadelphia Eagles	East	4	11	1	.281	2–4	4–8	.537	.469	L3
16	Atlanta Falcons	South	4	12	0	.250	1–5	2–10	.551	.391	L5
**Tiebreakers** (Note: When breaking ties for three or more teams under the NFL's rules, they are first broken within divisions, then comparing only the highest-ranked remaining team from each division.)
