= 2019 Philadelphia Eagles season =

87th season in franchise history

- Owner: Jeffrey Lurie
- General manager: Howie Roseman
- Head coach: Doug Pederson
- Offensive coordinator: Mike Groh
- Defensive coordinator: Jim Schwartz
- Home stadium: Lincoln Financial Field

Results
- Record: 9–7
- Division place: 1st NFC East
- Playoffs: Lost Wild Card Playoffs (vs. Seahawks) 9–17
- All-Pros: C Jason Kelce (1st team)
- Pro Bowlers: 6: TE Zach Ertz; T Lane Johnson; G Brandon Brooks; C Jason Kelce; DT Fletcher Cox; LS Rick Lovato

Uniform
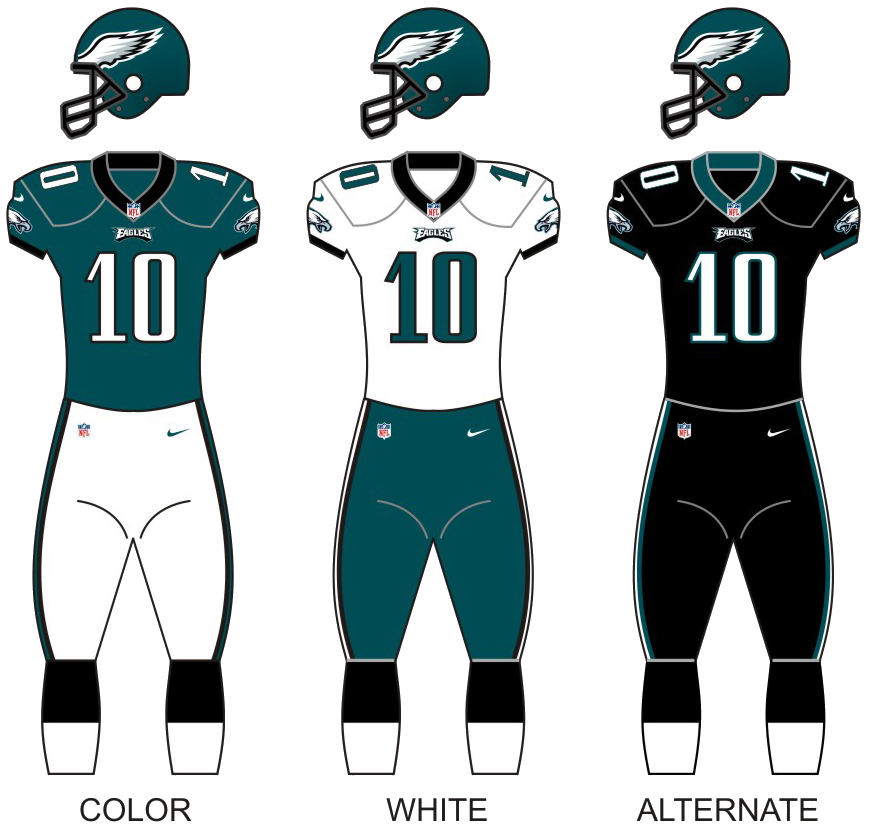

The 2019 season was the Philadelphia Eagles' 87th in the National Football League (NFL) and fourth under head coach Doug Pederson. The Eagles acquired many key players, including wide receiver DeSean Jackson, running back Jordan Howard and defensive tackle Malik Jackson. With these offseason acquisitions, the Eagles were listed as Super Bowl contenders. However, inconsistent play aided by injuries on both sides of the ball plagued the Eagles early in the year. Despite a 5–7 start, the Eagles won their last four games against divisional opponents and matched their 9–7 record from 2018. The Eagles won the NFC East division title (the second time in the Pederson/Wentz era), but were defeated by the Seattle Seahawks in the Wild Card round by a score of 17–9. The Eagles would not lose another home playoff game until 2025.

== Free agents ==
Position	Player	Tag	2019 team	Notes
RB	Jay Ajayi	UFA	Philadelphia Eagles	1-year deal
LB	D. J. Alexander	UFA	Jacksonville Jaguars	1-year deal, $805k
CB	Ronald Darby	UFA	Philadelphia Eagles	1-year deal, $8.5 million
QB	Nick Foles	UFA	Jacksonville Jaguars	4-year deal, $88 million
S	Corey Graham	UFA	TBD	
LB	Jordan Hicks	UFA	Arizona Cardinals	4-year deal, $36 million
DT	Timmy Jernigan	UFA	Philadelphia Eagles	1-year deal, $1.25 million
WR	Jordan Matthews	UFA	San Francisco 49ers	1-year deal, $1.8 million
DT	Haloti Ngata	UFA	Retired	
LB	LaRoy Reynolds	UFA	San Francisco 49ers	1-year deal, $645k
TE	Richard Rodgers	UFA	Philadelphia Eagles	2-year deal, $1.925 million
RB	Darren Sproles	UFA	Philadelphia Eagles	1-year deal
QB	Nate Sudfeld	RFA	Philadelphia Eagles	1-year deal, $3 million
WR	Golden Tate	UFA	New York Giants	4-year deal, $37.5 million
WR	Mike Wallace	UFA	Retired	
OG	Chance Warmack	UFA	TBD	
OG	Stefen Wisniewski	UFA	Philadelphia Eagles	1-year deal, $1.5 million

Player re-signed by the Eagles	Player not re-signed by the Eagles

=== Signings ===
Position	Player	Tag	2018 team	Date signed	Notes
DT	Malik Jackson	UFA	Jacksonville Jaguars	March 13	3-year deal, $30 million
LB	L. J. Fort	UFA	Pittsburgh Steelers	March 14	3-year deal, $5.5 million
S	Andrew Sendejo	UFA	Minnesota Vikings	March 18	1-year deal, $1.3 million
DE	Vinny Curry	UFA	Tampa Bay Buccaneers	March 21	1-year deal, $2.25 million
QB	Luis Perez	UFA	Birmingham Iron	April 9	1-year deal
WR	Greg Ward	UFA	San Antonio Commanders	April 9	1-year deal
WR	Charles Johnson	UFA	Orlando Apollos	April 9	1-year deal
LB	Zach Brown	UFA	Washington Redskins	May 3	1-year deal, $3 million
QB	Cody Kessler	UFA	Jacksonville Jaguars	May 13	1-year deal
WR	Devin Ross	UFA	Tennessee Titans	May 28	1-year deal
S	Trae Elston	UFA	Miami Dolphins	June 5	1-year deal
CB	Orlando Scandrick	UFA	Kansas City Chiefs	July 27	1-year deal, $1.12 million
TE	Alex Ellis	UFA	Kansas City Chiefs	August 2	1-year deal
S	Johnathan Cyprien	UFA	Tennessee Titans	August 2	1-year deal
CB	Sojourn Shelton	UFA	Cincinnati Bengals	August 11	1-year deal
DT	Aziz Shittu	UFA	Dallas Cowboys	August 13	1-year deal
QB	Josh McCown	UFA	New York Jets	August 17	1-year deal, $5.4 million
LB	Chris Worley	UFA	Seattle Seahawks	August 19	1-year deal
LB	Hayes Pullard	UFA	Arizona Cardinals	August 27	1-year deal
S	Jason Thompson	UFA	Atlanta Falcons	August 27	1-year deal
DT	Akeem Spence	UFA	Miami Dolphins	September 10	1-year deal

=== Departures ===
Position	Player	2019 team	Date	Reason
S	Chris Maragos	N/A	February 22	Released
G	Kaleb Johnson	Baltimore Brigade	May 1	Released
CB	Chandon Sullivan	Green Bay Packers	May 1	Released
WR	Dorren Miller	TBD	May 14	Released
DE	Chris Long	N/A	May 18	Retired
LB	B. J. Bello	New York Jets	June 5	Released
WR	Braxton Miller	Cleveland Browns	August 17	Released
LB	Paul Worrilow	New York Jets	August 18	Released
WR	Shelton Gibson	Cleveland Browns	August 21	Released
S	Tre Sullivan	DC Defenders	August 27	Released

=== Trades ===
- March 13: The Eagles traded a sixth-round pick in the 2019 NFL draft to the Tampa Bay Buccaneers for WR DeSean Jackson and a seventh-round pick in the 2020 NFL draft.
- March 14: The Eagles traded DE Michael Bennett and a seventh-round pick in the 2020 NFL draft to the New England Patriots for a fifth-round pick in the 2020 NFL draft.
- March 28: The Eagles traded a sixth-round pick in the 2020 NFL draft that could potentially become a fifth-round pick to the Chicago Bears for RB Jordan Howard.
- April 27: The Eagles traded a seventh-round pick in the 2019 NFL draft to the Indianapolis Colts for DT Hassan Ridgeway.
- August 9: The Eagles traded OT Ryan Bates to the Buffalo Bills for DE Eli Harold.
- August 22: The Eagles traded DT Bruce Hector to the Arizona Cardinals for S Rudy Ford.
- September 30: The Eagles traded S Johnathan Cyprien and a seventh-round pick in the 2020 NFL draft to the Atlanta Falcons for LB Duke Riley and a sixth-round pick in the 2020 NFL draft.

== NFL draft ==
2019 Philadelphia Eagles draft
Round	Pick	Player	Position	College	Notes
1	22	Andre Dillard	OT	Washington State	From Baltimore
2	53	Miles Sanders *	RB	Penn State	From Baltimore
2	57	J. J. Arcega-Whiteside	WR	Stanford	
4	138	Shareef Miller	DE	Penn State	From Pittsburgh
5	167	Clayton Thorson	QB	Northwestern	From Kansas City via LA Rams and New England
Made roster † Pro Football Hall of Fame * Made at least one Pro Bowl during career

Notes

- The Eagles acquired an additional second-round selection (No. 53 overall) as part of a trade that sent their 2018 first- and fourth-round selections to the Baltimore Ravens.
- The Eagles traded their third-round selection (No. 88 overall) to the Detroit Lions in exchange for wide receiver Golden Tate.
- The Eagles acquired an additional seventh-round selection in a 2017 trade that sent guard Allen Barbre to the Denver Broncos. This selection was later traded to the New England Patriots in exchange for the Patriots' seventh-round selection.
- The Eagles traded their sixth-round selection (No. 208 overall) to the Tampa Bay Buccaneers in exchange for wide receiver DeSean Jackson and Tampa's 2020 seventh-round selection.
- The Eagles traded their first-round selection (No. 25 overall) as well as a fourth-round selection (No. 127 overall) and a sixth-round selection (No. 197 overall) to the Baltimore Ravens in exchange for their first-round selection (No. 22 overall)
- The Eagles traded their fifth-round selection (No. 163 overall) to the New England Patriots in exchange for a fifth-round selection (No. 167 overall) and a seventh-round selection (No. 246 overall)
- The Eagles traded their seventh-round selection acquired from the New England Patriots (No. 246 overall) to the Indianapolis Colts in exchange for defensive tackle Hassan Ridgeway.
- As the result of a negative differential of free-agent signings and departures that the Eagles experienced during the 2018 free agency period, the team was projected to receive three compensatory selections for the 2019 draft.

Undrafted free agents
Player	Position	College
Joey Alfieri	LB	Stanford
Ryan Bates	OT	Penn State
T. J. Edwards	LB	Wisconsin
Nico Evans	RB	Wyoming
Johnny Gibson	OG	Arkansas
Ajene Harris	CB	USC
Nate Herbig	OG	Stanford
Jay Liggins	CB	Dickinson State
Riley Mayfield	OT	North Texas
Sua Opeta	OG	Weber State
Keegan Render	C	Iowa
Anthony Rush	DT	UAB
DeAndre Thompkins	WR	Penn State
Brett Toth	OT	Army
Casey Tucker	OT	Arizona State
Kevin Wilkins	DT	Rutgers

== Staff ==
2019 Philadelphia Eagles staff
Front office: Chairman/CEO – Jeffrey Lurie; President – Don Smolenski; Executive vice president/general manager – Howie Roseman; Senior football advisor – Tom Donahoe; Vice president of player personnel – Andy Weidl; Vice president of football operations – Andrew Berry; Vice president of football operations and strategy – Alec Halaby; Vice president of football operations and compliance – Jon Ferrari; Assistant director of player personnel – Ian Cunningham; Senior director of college scouting – Anthony Patch; Assistant director of college scouting – Alan Wolking; Director of pro scouting – Brandon Brown; Assistant director of pro scouting – Max Gruder; Vice president of football administration – Jake Rosenberg; Director of football administration – Bryce Johnston; Player personnel executive – T. J. McCreight; Advanced projects coordinator – Jeremiah Washburn; Director of scouting operations – Casey Weidl; Head coaches: Head coach – Doug Pederson; Assistant head coach/running backs – Duce Staley; Offensive coaches: Offensive coordinator – Mike Groh; Quarterbacks – Press Taylor; Assistant quarterbacks – Spencer Phillips; Assistant running backs – T. J. Paganetti; Wide receivers – Carson Walch; Assistant wide receivers – Matthew Harper; Tight ends – Justin Peelle; Assistant tight ends – Mike Bartrum; Run game coordinator/offensive line – Jeff Stoutland; Assistant offensive line – Roy Istvan; Offensive special projects – G. J. Kinne; Offensive analyst – Trent Miles	Defensive coaches: Defensive coordinator – Jim Schwartz; Defensive line – Phillip Daniels; Assistant defensive line – Nathan Ollie; Linebackers – Ken Flajole; Assistant linebackers – Ryan Paganetti; Defensive backs – Cory Undlin; Safeties – Tim Hauck; Assistant secondary – Dino Vasso; Defensive special assistant – Matt Burke; Special teams coaches: Special teams coordinator – Dave Fipp; Assistant special teams – Luke Thompson; Strength and conditioning: Head strength coach – Josh Hingst; Assistant strength coach – Keith Gray; Performance nutrition coordinator – Michael Minnis; Strength assistant – Ben Wagner; Director of high performance – Shaun Huls

== Roster ==
2019 Philadelphia Eagles roster
Quarterbacks (QB): 18 Josh McCown; 7 Nate Sudfeld; 11 Carson Wentz; Running backs (RB): 24 Jordan Howard; 26 Miles Sanders; 35 Boston Scott; Wide receivers (WR): 13 Nelson Agholor; 19 J. J. Arcega-Whiteside; 16 Deontay Burnett; 14 Robert Davis; 84 Greg Ward; Tight ends (TE): 86 Zach Ertz; 88 Dallas Goedert; 81 Joshua Perkins; 82 Richard Rodgers	Offensive linemen (OL): 79 Brandon Brooks G; 77 Andre Dillard T; 67 Nate Herbig G; 65 Lane Johnson T; 62 Jason Kelce C; 78 Sua Opeta G; 71 Jason Peters T; 69 Matt Pryor G; 73 Isaac Seumalo G; 72 Halapoulivaati Vaitai T; Defensive linemen (DL): 96 Derek Barnett DE; 91 Fletcher Cox DT; 75 Vinny Curry DE; 55 Brandon Graham DE; 74 Daeshon Hall DE; 90 Bruce Hector DT; 93 Timmy Jernigan DT; 51 Shareef Miller DE; 66 Anthony Rush DT; 94 Josh Sweat DE	Linebackers (LB): 58 Genard Avery OLB; 53 Nigel Bradham OLB; 57 T. J. Edwards MLB; 47 Nate Gerry OLB; 50 Duke Riley OLB; 49 Alex Singleton MLB; Defensive backs (DB): 32 Rasul Douglas CB; 37 Marcus Epps FS; 39 Craig James CB; 27 Malcolm Jenkins FS; 22 Sidney Jones CB; 34 Cre'Von LeBlanc CB; 29 Avonte Maddox CB; 23 Rodney McLeod SS; 31 Jalen Mills CB; Special teams (ST): 4 Jake Elliott K; 1 Cameron Johnston P; 45 Rick Lovato LS	Practice squad: 6 River Cracraft WR; 52 Deshaun Davis MLB; 85 Alex Ellis TE; 89 Marcus Green WR; 48 De'Angelo Henderson RB; 76 Albert Huggins DT; 8 Kyle Lauletta QB; 80 Marken Michel WR; 64 Keegan Render C; 38 Tremon Smith CB; Reserve: 30 Corey Clement RB (IR); 21 Ronald Darby CB (IR); 36 Rudy Ford SS (IR); 54 Kamu Grugier-Hill OLB (IR); 10 DeSean Jackson WR (IR); 97 Malik Jackson DT (IR); 17 Alshon Jeffery WR (IR); 68 Jordan Mailata T (IR); 95 Joe Ostman DE (IR); 98 Hassan Ridgeway DT (IR); 43 Darren Sproles RB (IR); Rookies in italics 53 active, 11 reserve, 10 practice squad

== Preseason ==
Week	Date	Opponent	Result	Record	Venue	Recap
1	August 8	Tennessee Titans	L 10–27	0–1	Lincoln Financial Field	Recap
2	August 15	at Jacksonville Jaguars	W 24–10	1–1	TIAA Bank Field	Recap
3	August 22	Baltimore Ravens	L 15–26	1–2	Lincoln Financial Field	Recap
4	August 29	at New York Jets	L 0–6	1–3	MetLife Stadium	Recap

== Regular season ==
=== Schedule ===
Week	Date	Opponent	Result	Record	Venue	Recap
1	September 8	**Washington Redskins**	**W** 32–27	1–0	Lincoln Financial Field	Recap
2	September 15	at Atlanta Falcons	**L** 20–24	1–1	Mercedes-Benz Stadium	Recap
3	September 22	Detroit Lions	**L** 24–27	1–2	Lincoln Financial Field	Recap
4	September 26	at Green Bay Packers	**W** 34–27	2–2	Lambeau Field	Recap
5	October 6	New York Jets	**W** 31–6	3–2	Lincoln Financial Field	Recap
6	October 13	at Minnesota Vikings	**L** 20–38	3–3	U.S. Bank Stadium	Recap
7	October 20	at **Dallas Cowboys**	**L** 10–37	3–4	AT&T Stadium	Recap
8	October 27	at Buffalo Bills	**W** 31–13	4–4	New Era Field	Recap
9	November 3	Chicago Bears	**W** 22–14	5–4	Lincoln Financial Field	Recap
10	Bye					
11	November 17	New England Patriots	**L** 10–17	5–5	Lincoln Financial Field	Recap
12	November 24	Seattle Seahawks	**L** 9–17	5–6	Lincoln Financial Field	Recap
13	December 1	at Miami Dolphins	**L** 31–37	5–7	Hard Rock Stadium	Recap
14	December 9	**New York Giants**	**W** 23–17 (OT)	6–7	Lincoln Financial Field	Recap
15	December 15	at **Washington Redskins**	**W** 37–27	7–7	FedExField	Recap
16	December 22	**Dallas Cowboys**	**W** 17–9	8–7	Lincoln Financial Field	Recap
17	December 29	at **New York Giants**	**W** 34–17	9–7	MetLife Stadium	Recap

Note: Intra-division opponents are in bold text.

=== Game summaries ===
==== Week 1: vs. Washington Redskins ====
Week One: Washington Redskins at Philadelphia Eagles – Game summary

Quarter	1	2	3	4	Total
Redskins	10	10	0	7	**27**
**Eagles**	0	7	14	11	**32**

at Lincoln Financial Field, Philadelphia, Pennsylvania

- Date: September 8
- Game time: 1:00 p.m. EDT
- Game weather: Sunny, 79 °F (26 °C)
- Game attendance: 69,696
- Referee: Ronald Torbert
- TV announcers (Fox): Kevin Burkhardt, Charles Davis and Pam Oliver
- Recap, Game Book

Game information

**First quarter**

- WAS – Vernon Davis 48-yard pass from Case Keenum (Dustin Hopkins kick), 10:54. Redskins 7–0. **Drive: 7 plays, 80 yards, 4:06.**
- WAS – Dustin Hopkins 41-yard field goal, 2:48. Redskins 10–0. **Drive: 11 plays, 57 yards, 5:55.**

**Second quarter**

- WAS – Terry McLaurin 69-yard pass from Case Keenum (Dustin Hopkins kick), 9:57. Redskins 17–0. **Drive: 2 plays, 71 yards, 0:52**
- PHI – DeSean Jackson 51-yard pass from Carson Wentz (Jake Elliott kick), 4:19. Redskins 17–7. **Drive: 5 plays, 62 yards, 1:28**
- WAS – Dustin Hopkins 48-yard field goal, 0:00. Redskins 20–7. **Drive: 9 plays, 41 yards, 1:41.**

**Third quarter**

- PHI – Alshon Jeffery 5-yard pass from Carson Wentz (Jake Elliott kick), 7:50. Redskins 20–14. **Drive: 12 plays, 75 yards, 7:10**
- PHI – DeSean Jackson 53-yard pass from Carson Wentz (Jake Elliott kick), 5:07. Eagles 21–20. **Drive: 3 plays, 53 yards, 0:15**

**Fourth quarter**

- PHI – Alshon Jeffery 2-yard rush (Darren Sproles rush), 14:55. Eagles 29–20. **Drive: 9 plays, 71 yards, 4:42**
- PHI – Jake Elliott 22-yard field goal, 3:10. Eagles 32–20. **Drive: 19 plays, 74 yards, 8:55**
- WAS – Trey Quinn 4-yard pass from Case Keenum, 0:06. Eagles 32–27. **Drive: 15 plays, 75 yards, 3:04**

**Top passers**

- WAS – Case Keenum – 30/44, 380 yards, 3 TD
- PHI – Carson Wentz – 28/39, 313 yards, 3 TD

**Top rushers**

- WAS – Derrius Guice – 10 rushes, 18 yards
- PHI – Darren Sproles – 9 rushes, 47 yards

**Top receivers**

- WAS – Terry McLaurin – 5 receptions, 125 yards, TD
- PHI – DeSean Jackson – 8 receptions, 154 yards, 2 TD

==== Week 2: at Atlanta Falcons ====
Week Two: Philadelphia Eagles at Atlanta Falcons – Game summary

Quarter	1	2	3	4	Total
Eagles	0	6	6	8	**20**
**Falcons**	3	7	7	7	**24**

at Mercedes-Benz Stadium, Atlanta, Georgia

- Date: September 15
- Game time: 8:20 pm. EDT
- Game weather: Partly cloudy (retractable roof open)
- Game attendance: 72,443
- Referee: Brad Allen
- TV announcers (NBC): Al Michaels, Cris Collinsworth and Michele Tafoya
- Recap, Game Book

Game information

**First quarter**

- ATL – Matt Bryant 50-yard field goal, 9:28. Falcons 3–0. **Drive: 11 plays, 43 yards, 5:32.**

**Second quarter**

- PHI – Jake Elliott 34-yard field goal, 10:45. Tied 3–3. **Drive: 9 plays, 27 yards, 4:45.**
- ATL – Calvin Ridley 34-yard pass from Matt Ryan (Matt Bryant kick), 4:56. Falcons 10–3. **Drive: 5 plays, 65 yards, 2:31.**
- PHI – Jake Elliott 41-yard field goal, 0:00. Falcons 10–6. **Drive: 8 plays, 18 yards, 0:43.**

**Third quarter**

- ATL – Julio Jones 4-yard pass from Matt Ryan (Matt Bryant kick), 13:23. Falcons 17–6. **Drive: 3 plays, 33 yards, 1:28.**
- PHI – Nelson Agholor 4-yard pass from Carson Wentz (run failed), 4:57. Falcons 17–12. **Drive: 6 plays, 27 yards, 3:08.**

**Fourth quarter**

- PHI – Carson Wentz 1-yard run (Carson Wentz–Zach Ertz pass), 3:13. Eagles 20–17. **Drive: 13 plays, 73 yards, 8:29.**
- ATL – Julio Jones 54-yard pass from Matt Ryan (Matt Bryant kick), 2:10. Falcons 24–20. **Drive: 6 plays, 75 yards, 1:03.**

**Top passers**

- PHI – Carson Wentz – 25/43, 231 yards, TD, 2 INT
- ATL – Matt Ryan – 27/43, 320 yards, 3 TD, 3 INT

**Top rushers**

- PHI – Miles Sanders – 10 rushes, 28 yards
- ATL – Ito Smith – 4 rushes, 32 yards

**Top receivers**

- PHI – Nelson Agholor – 8 receptions, 107 yards, TD
- ATL – Julio Jones – 8 receptions, 106 yards, 2 TD

==== Week 3: vs. Detroit Lions ====
Week Three: Detroit Lions at Philadelphia Eagles – Game summary

Quarter	1	2	3	4	Total
**Lions**	7	13	0	7	**27**
Eagles	10	0	7	7	**24**

at Lincoln Financial Field, Philadelphia, Pennsylvania

- Date: September 22
- Game time: 1:00 pm. EDT
- Game weather: Sunny, 84 °F (29 °C)
- Game attendance: 69,796
- Referee: Tony Corrente
- TV announcers (Fox): Thom Brennaman, Chris Spielman and Shannon Spake
- Recap, Game Book

Game information

**First quarter**

- PHI – Jake Elliott 25-yard field goal, 11:28. Eagles 3–0. **Drive: 9 plays, 69 yards, 3:32.**
- DET – Jamal Agnew 100-yard kickoff return (Matt Prater kick), 11:14. Lions 7–3. **Drive: 0 plays, 0 yards, 0:14.**
- PHI – Jordan Howard 1-yard run (Jake Elliott kick), 6:15. Eagles 10–7. **Drive: 9 plays, 75 yards, 4:59.**

**Second quarter**

- DET – Kerryon Johnson 1-yard run (Matt Prater kick), 14:09. Lions 14–10. **Drive: 13 plays, 75 yards, 7:06.**
- DET – Matt Prater 25-yard field goal, 3:29. Lions 17–10. **Drive: 5 plays, 44 yards, 1:21.**
- DET – Matt Prater 33-yard field goal, 0:57. Lions 20–10. **Drive: 4 plays, 7 yards, 0:54.**

**Third quarter**

- PHI – Nelson Agholor 20-yard pass from Carson Wentz (Jake Elliott kick), 4:15. Lions 20–17. **Drive: 6 plays, 47 yards, 2:44.**

**Fourth quarter**

- DET – Marvin Jones 12-yard pass from Matthew Stafford (Matt Prater kick), 14:53. Lions 27–17. **Drive: 9 plays, 75 yards, 4:22.**
- PHI – Nelson Agholor 2-yard pass from Carson Wentz (Jake Elliott kick), 6:59. Lions 27–24. **Drive: 10 plays, 80 yards, 4:32.**

**Top passers**

- DET – Matthew Stafford – 18/32, 201 yards, TD
- PHI – Carson Wentz – 19/36, 259 yards, 2 TD

**Top rushers**

- DET – J. D. McKissic – 1 rush, 44 yards
- PHI – Miles Sanders – 13 rushes, 53 yards

**Top receivers**

- DET – Marvin Jones – 6 receptions, 101 yards, TD
- PHI – Miles Sanders – 2 receptions, 73 yards

==== Week 4: at Green Bay Packers ====
Week Four: Philadelphia Eagles at Green Bay Packers – Game summary

Quarter	1	2	3	4	Total
**Eagles**	0	21	6	7	**34**
Packers	7	13	7	0	**27**

at Lambeau Field, Green Bay, Wisconsin

- Date: September 26
- Game time: 8:20 pm. EDT/7:20 p.m. CDT
- Game weather: Cloudy, 60 °F (16 °C)
- Game attendance: 77,509
- Referee: Clay Martin
- TV announcers (Fox/NFLN/Amazon Prime): Joe Buck, Troy Aikman, Erin Andrews and Kristina Pink
- Recap, Game Book

Game information

**First quarter**

- GB – Aaron Jones 3-yard run (Mason Crosby kick), 10:31. Packers 7–0. **Drive: 5 plays, 89 yards, 2:18.**

**Second quarter**

- GB – Mason Crosby 30-yard field goal, 14:01. Packers 10–0. **Drive: 15 plays, 78 yards, 8:01.**
- PHI – Alshon Jeffery 6-yard pass from Carson Wentz (Jake Elliott kick), 11:48. Packers 10–7. **Drive: 5 plays, 34 yards, 2:13.**
- GB – Mason Crosby 31-yard field goal, 8:24. Packers 13–7. **Drive: 7 plays, 63 yards, 3:24.**
- PHI – Dallas Goedert 3-yard pass from Carson Wentz (Jake Elliott kick), 2:45. Eagles 14–13. **Drive: 11 plays, 60 yards, 5:39.**
- PHI – Jordan Howard 1-yard run (Jake Elliott kick), 0:59. Eagles 21–13. **Drive: 4 plays, 17 yards, 0:54.**
- GB – Geronimo Allison 19-yard pass from Aaron Rodgers (Mason Crosby kick), 0:09. Eagles 21–20. **Drive: 7 plays, 70 yards, 0:50.**

**Third quarter**

- PHI – Jordan Howard 20-yard pass from Carson Wentz (pass failed), 9:12. Eagles 27–20. **Drive: 8 plays, 76 yards, 3:43.**
- GB – Jimmy Graham 14-yard pass from Aaron Rodgers (Mason Crosby kick), 3:16. Tied 27–27. **Drive: 8 plays, 72 yards, 3:34.**

**Fourth quarter**

- PHI – Jordan Howard 2-yard run (Jake Elliott kick), 14:13. Eagles 34–27. **Drive: 8 plays, 75 yards, 4:03.**

**Top passers**

- PHI – Carson Wentz – 16/27, 160 yards, 3 TD
- GB – Aaron Rodgers – 34/53, 422 yards, 2 TD, INT

**Top rushers**

- PHI – Jordan Howard – 15 rushes, 87 yards, 2 TD
- GB – Aaron Rodgers – 5 rushes, 46 yards

**Top receivers**

- PHI – Zach Ertz – 7 receptions, 65 yards
- GB – Davante Adams – 10 receptions, 180 yards

==== Week 5: vs. New York Jets ====
Week Five: New York Jets at Philadelphia Eagles – Game summary

Quarter	1	2	3	4	Total
Jets	0	0	0	6	**6**
**Eagles**	14	7	3	7	**31**

at Lincoln Financial Field, Philadelphia, Pennsylvania

- Date: October 6
- Game time: 1:00 pm. EDT
- Game weather: Cloudy, 68 °F (20 °C)
- Game attendance: 69,796
- Referee: Adrian Hill
- TV announcers (CBS): Kevin Harlan, Rich Gannon and Jay Feely
- Recap, Game Book

Game information

**First quarter**

- PHI – Jordan Howard 1-yard run (Jake Elliott kick), 7:44. Eagles 7–0. **Drive: 9 plays, 53 yards, 5:11.**
- PHI – Nathan Gerry 51-yard interception return (Jake Elliott kick), 5:04. Eagles 14–0.

**Second quarter**

- PHI – Zach Ertz 11-yard pass from Carson Wentz (Jake Elliott kick), 0:34. Eagles 21–0. **Drive: 7 plays, 42 yards, 1:28.**

**Third quarter**

- PHI – Jake Elliott 28-yard field goal, 1:26. Eagles 24–0. **Drive: 12 plays, 77 yards, 7:09.**

**Fourth quarter**

- NYJ – Vyncint Smith 19-yard run (pass failed), 14:32. Eagles 24–6. **Drive: 1 play, 19 yards, 0:08.**
- PHI – Orlando Scandrick 44-yard fumble return (Jake Elliott kick), 7:39. Eagles 31–6.

**Top passers**

- NYJ – Luke Falk – 15/26, 120 yards, 2 INT
- PHI – Carson Wentz – 17/29, 189 yards, TD

**Top rushers**

- NYJ – Le'Veon Bell – 15 rushes, 43 yards
- PHI – Jordan Howard – 13 rushes, 62 yards, TD

**Top receivers**

- NYJ – Demaryius Thomas – 4 receptions, 47 yards
- PHI – Zach Ertz – 5 receptions, 57 yards, TD

With the win, the Eagles improved to 11–0 in their all-time series against the New York Jets.

==== Week 6: at Minnesota Vikings ====
Week Six: Philadelphia Eagles at Minnesota Vikings – Game summary

Quarter	1	2	3	4	Total
Eagles	0	10	10	0	**20**
**Vikings**	10	14	7	7	**38**

at U.S. Bank Stadium, Minneapolis, Minnesota

- Date: October 13
- Game time: 1:00 pm. EDT/12:00 pm. CDT
- Game weather: None (indoor stadium)
- Game attendance: 66,837
- Referee: Scott Novak
- TV announcers (Fox): Kenny Albert, Charles Davis and Pam Oliver
- Recap, Game Book

Game information

**First quarter**

- MIN – Adam Thielen 6-yard pass from Kirk Cousins (Dan Bailey kick), 7:43. Vikings 7–0. **Drive: 13 plays, 75 yards, 7:17.**
- MIN – Dan Bailey 39-yard field goal, 1:54. Vikings 10–0. **Drive: 9 plays, 35 yards, 3:36.**

**Second quarter**

- PHI – Jake Elliott 53-yard field goal, 12:10. Vikings 10–3. **Drive: 10 plays, 40 yards, 4:44.**
- MIN – Stefon Diggs 62-yard pass from Kirk Cousins (Dan Bailey kick), 11:39. Vikings 17–3. **Drive: 2 plays, 75 yards, 0:31.**
- MIN – Stefon Diggs 51-yard pass from Kirk Cousins (Dan Bailey kick), 9:31. Vikings 24–3. **Drive: 1 play, 51 yards, 0:08.**
- PHI – Miles Sanders 32-yard pass from Carson Wentz (Jake Elliott kick), 7:02. Vikings 24–10. **Drive: 5 plays, 75 yards, 2:29.**

**Third quarter**

- PHI – Alshon Jeffery 3-yard pass from Carson Wentz (Jake Elliott kick), 12:11. Vikings 24–17. **Drive: 6 plays, 75 yards, 2:49.**
- PHI – Jake Elliott 40-yard field goal, 6:19. Vikings 24–20. **Drive: 5 plays, 33 yards, 2:44.**
- MIN – Stefon Diggs 11-yard pass from Kirk Cousins (Dan Bailey kick), 1:16. Vikings 31–20. **Drive: 9 plays, 75 yards, 5:03.**

**Fourth quarter**

- MIN – Dalvin Cook 1-yard run (Dan Bailey kick), 8:17. Vikings 38–20. **Drive: 8 plays, 88 yards, 4:44.**

**Top passers**

- PHI – Carson Wentz – 26/40, 306 yards, 2 TD, INT
- MIN – Kirk Cousins – 22/29, 333 yards, 4 TD, INT

**Top rushers**

- PHI – Jordan Howard – 13 rushes, 49 yards
- MIN – Alexander Mattison – 14 rushes, 63 yards

**Top receivers**

- PHI – Miles Sanders – 3 receptions, 86 yards, TD
- MIN – Stefon Diggs – 7 receptions, 167 yards, 3 TD

==== Week 7: at Dallas Cowboys ====
Week Seven: Philadelphia Eagles at Dallas Cowboys – Game summary

Quarter	1	2	3	4	Total
Eagles	7	0	3	0	**10**
**Cowboys**	14	13	0	10	**37**

at AT&T Stadium, Arlington, Texas

- Date: October 20
- Game time: 8:20 pm. EDT/7:20 pm. CDT
- Game weather: None (retractable roof closed)
- Game attendance: 91,213
- Referee: Jerome Boger
- TV announcers (NBC): Al Michaels, Cris Collinsworth and Michele Tafoya
- Recap, Game Book

Game information

**First quarter**

- DAL – Tavon Austin 20-yard run (Brett Maher kick), 10:08. Cowboys 7–0. **Drive: 6 plays, 45 yards, 3:02.**
- DAL – Ezekiel Elliott 1-yard run (Brett Maher kick), 8:56. Cowboys 14–0. **Drive: 2 plays, 14 yards, 0:18.**
- PHI – Dallas Goedert 28-yard pass from Carson Wentz (Jake Elliott kick), 4:38. Cowboys 14–7. **Drive: 7 plays, 87 yards, 4:18.**

**Second quarter**

- DAL – Blake Jarwin 1-yard pass from Dak Prescott (Brett Maher kick), 6:40. Cowboys 21–7. **Drive: 12 plays, 71 yards, 6:52.**
- DAL – Brett Maher 26-yard field goal, 1:31. Cowboys 24–7. **Drive: 8 plays, 72 yards, 1:16.**
- DAL – Brett Maher 63-yard field goal, 0:00. Cowboys 27–7. **Drive: 5 plays, 25 yards, 0:22.**

**Third quarter**

- PHI – Jake Elliott 38-yard field goal, 4:59. Cowboys 27–10. **Drive: 12 plays, 66 yards, 5:51.**

**Fourth quarter**

- DAL – Brett Maher 29-yard field goal, 12:36. Cowboys 30–10. **Drive: 13 plays, 64 yards, 7:23.**
- DAL – Dak Prescott 8-yard run (Brett Maher kick), 9:33. Cowboys 37–10. **Drive: 3 plays, 16 yards, 1:21.**

**Top passers**

- PHI – Carson Wentz – 16/26, 191 yards, TD, INT
- DAL – Dak Prescott – 21/27, 239 yards, TD, INT

**Top rushers**

- PHI – Jordan Howard – 11 rushes, 50 yards
- DAL – Ezekiel Elliott – 22 rushes, 111 yards, TD

**Top receivers**

- PHI – Dallas Goedert – 4 receptions, 69 yards, TD
- DAL – Amari Cooper – 5 receptions, 106 yards

==== Week 8: at Buffalo Bills ====
Week Eight: Philadelphia Eagles at Buffalo Bills – Game summary

Quarter	1	2	3	4	Total
**Eagles**	3	8	13	7	**31**
Bills	0	7	6	0	**13**

at New Era Field, Orchard Park, New York

- Date: October 27
- Game time: 1:00 pm. EDT
- Game weather: Cloudy with showers and wind, 54 °F (12 °C)
- Game attendance: 69,435
- Referee: John Hussey
- TV announcers (Fox): Chris Myers, Daryl Johnston and Laura Okmin
- Recap, Game Book

Game information

**First quarter**

- PHI – Jake Elliott 37-yard field goal, 3:38. Eagles 3–0. **Drive: 9 plays, 54 yards, 4:35.**

**Second quarter**

- BUF – Cole Beasley 14-yard pass from Josh Allen (Stephen Hauschka kick), 14:48. Bills 7–3. **Drive: 10 plays, 75 yards, 3:50.**
- PHI – Dallas Goedert 5-yard pass from Carson Wentz (Miles Sanders run), 0:25. Eagles 11–7. **Drive: 5 plays, 24 yards, 1:28.**

**Third quarter**

- PHI – Miles Sanders 65-yard run (kick failed, hit left upright), 14:02. Eagles 17–7. **Drive: 2 plays, 67 yards, 0:58.**
- BUF – Devin Singletary 28-yard pass from Josh Allen (kick blocked), 9:36. Eagles 17–13. **Drive: 10 plays, 75 yards, 4:26.**
- PHI – Boston Scott 4-yard run (Jake Elliott kick), 5:38. Eagles 24–13. **Drive: 6 plays, 68 yards, 3:58.**

**Fourth quarter**

- PHI – Jordan Howard 3-yard run (Jake Elliott kick), 6:12. Eagles 31–13. **Drive: 14 plays, 83 yards, 8:17.**

**Top passers**

- PHI – Carson Wentz – 17/24, 172 yards, TD
- BUF – Josh Allen – 16/34, 169 yards, 2 TD

**Top rushers**

- PHI – Jordan Howard – 23 rushes, 96 yards, TD
- BUF – Josh Allen – 8 rushes, 45 yards

**Top receivers**

- PHI – Alshon Jeffery – 4 receptions, 64 yards
- BUF – John Brown – 5 receptions, 54 yards

==== Week 9: vs. Chicago Bears ====
Week Nine: Chicago Bears at Philadelphia Eagles – Game summary

Quarter	1	2	3	4	Total
Bears	0	0	7	7	**14**
**Eagles**	3	9	7	3	**22**

at Lincoln Financial Field, Philadelphia, Pennsylvania

- Date: November 3
- Game time: 1:00 pm. EST
- Game weather: Sunny, 52 °F (11 °C)
- Game attendance: 69,796
- Referee: Craig Wrolstad
- TV announcers (Fox): Dick Stockton, Mark Schlereth and Jennifer Hale
- Recap, Game Book

Game information

**First quarter**

- PHI - Jake Elliott 28-yard field goal, 6:45. Eagles 3-0. **Drive: 12 plays, 70 yards, 6:33.**

**Second quarter**

- PHI - Jake Elliott 28-yard field goal, 13:22. Eagles 6-0. **Drive: 12 plays, 61 yards, 7:16.**
- PHI - Zach Ertz 25-yard pass from Carson Wentz (kick failed), 6:21. Eagles 12-0. **Drive: 7 plays, 62 yards, 3:58.**

**Third quarter**

- PHI - Jordan Howard 13-yard run (Jake Elliott kick), 10:37. Eagles 19-0. **Drive: 8 plays, 84 yards, 4:23.**
- CHI - David Montgomery 1-yard run (Eddy Pineiro kick), 6:29. Eagles 19-7. **Drive: 7 plays, 75 yards, 4:08.**

**Fourth quarter**

- CHI - David Montgomery 1-yard run (Eddy Pineiro kick), 12:43. Eagles 19-14. **Drive: 8 plays, 58 yards, 3:21.**
- PHI - Jake Elliott 38-yard field goal, 0:25. Eagles 22-14. **Drive: 16 plays, 69 yards, 8:14.**

**Top passers**

- CHI - Mitch Trubisky - 10/21, 125 yards
- PHI - Carson Wentz - 26/39, 239 yards, TD

**Top rushers**

- CHI - David Montgomery - 14 rushes, 40 yards, 2 TD
- PHI - Jordan Howard - 19 rushes, 82 yards, TD

**Top receivers**

- CHI - Taylor Gabriel - 3 receptions, 69 yards
- PHI - Zach Ertz - 9 receptions, 103 yards, TD

==== Week 11: vs. New England Patriots ====
Week Eleven: New England Patriots at Philadelphia Eagles – Game summary

Quarter	1	2	3	4	Total
**Patriots**	0	9	8	0	**17**
Eagles	3	7	0	0	**10**

at Lincoln Financial Field, Philadelphia, Pennsylvania

- Date: November 17
- Game time: 4:25 pm. EST
- Game weather: Cloudy, 42 °F (6 °C)
- Game attendance: 69,796
- Referee: Bill Vinovich
- TV announcers (CBS): Jim Nantz, Tony Romo and Tracy Wolfson
- Recap, Game Book

Game information

**First quarter**

- PHI – Jake Elliott 42-yard field goal, 13:38. Eagles 3–0. **Drive: 4 plays, 51 yards, 1:22.**

**Second quarter**

- PHI – Dallas Goedert 5-yard pass from Carson Wentz (Jake Elliott kick), 12:36. Eagles 10–0. **Drive: 16 plays, 95 yards, 9:33.**
- NE – Nick Folk 35-yard field goal, 8:37. Eagles 10–3. **Drive: 13 plays, 59 yards, 3:59.**
- NE – Nick Folk 22-yard field goal, 3:21. Eagles 10–6. **Drive: 11 plays, 44 yards, 3:20.**
- NE – Nick Folk 39-yard field goal, 1:44. Eagles 10-9. **Drive: 4 plays, 1 yard, 0:42.**

**Third quarter**

- NE - Phillip Dorsett 15-yard pass from Julian Edelman (James White run), 10:49. Patriots 17-10. **Drive: 10 plays, 84 yards, 4:11**

**Fourth quarter**

- No scoring plays.

**Top passers**

- PHI – Carson Wentz – 20/40, 214 yards, TD
- NE – Tom Brady – 26/47, 216 yards

**Top rushers**

- PHI – Miles Sanders – 11 rushes, 38 yards
- NE – Sony Michel – 10 rushes, 33 yards

**Top receivers**

- PHI – Zach Ertz – 9 receptions, 94 yards
- NE – Julian Edelman – 5 receptions, 53 yards

==== Week 12: vs. Seattle Seahawks ====
Week Twelve: Seattle Seahawks at Philadelphia Eagles – Game summary

Quarter	1	2	3	4	Total
**Seahawks**	7	3	0	7	**17**
Eagles	3	0	0	6	**9**

at Lincoln Financial Field, Philadelphia, Pennsylvania

- Date: November 24
- Game time: 1:00 pm. EST
- Game weather: Rain, 40 °F (4 °C)
- Game attendance: 69,796
- Referee: Walt Anderson
- TV announcers (Fox): Kevin Burkhardt, Charles Davis and Pam Oliver
- Recap, Game Book

Game information

**First quarter**

- PHI – Jake Elliott 28-yard field goal, 7:29. Eagles 3–0. **Drive: 9 plays, 33 yards, 4:23.**
- SEA – Malik Turner 33-yard pass from Russell Wilson (Jason Myers kick), 5:54. Seahawks 7–3. **Drive: 4 plays, 75 yards, 1:35.**

**Second quarter**

- SEA – Jason Myers 24-yard field goal, 7:13. Seahawks 10–3. **Drive: 11 plays, 77 yards, 6:14.**

**Third quarter**

- No scoring plays.

**Fourth quarter**

- SEA – Rashaad Penny 58-yard run, 11:56. Seahawks 17–3. **Drive: 7 plays, 88 yards, 4:10.**
- PHI – Zach Ertz 2-yard pass from Carson Wentz (run failed), 0:20. Seahawks 17–9. **Drive: 8 plays, 80 yards, 2:03.**

**Top passers**

- SEA – Russell Wilson – 13/25, 200 yards, TD, INT
- PHI – Carson Wentz – 33/45, 256 yards, TD, 2 INT

**Top rushers**

- SEA – Rashaad Penny – 14 rushes, 129 yards, TD
- PHI – Miles Sanders – 12 rushes, 63 yards

**Top receivers**

- SEA – Chris Carson – 4 receptions, 31 yards
- PHI – Zach Ertz – 12 receptions, 91 yards, TD

==== Week 13: at Miami Dolphins ====
Week Thirteen: Philadelphia Eagles at Miami Dolphins – Game summary

Quarter	1	2	3	4	Total
Eagles	10	11	7	3	**31**
**Dolphins**	7	7	12	11	**37**

at Hard Rock Stadium, Miami Gardens, Florida

- Date: December 1
- Game time: 1:00 pm. EST
- Game weather: Partly cloudy, 82 °F (28 °C)
- Game attendance: 65,545
- Referee: Adrian Hill
- TV announcers (Fox): Kenny Albert, Ronde Barber and Peter Schrager
- Recap, Game Book

Game information

**First quarter**

- PHI – Miles Sanders 15-yard pass from Carson Wentz (Jake Elliott kick), 13:54. Eagles 7–0. **Drive: 3 plays, 18 yards, 0:56.**
- PHI – Jake Elliott 48-yard field goal, 10:10. Eagles 10–0. **Drive: 6 plays, 18 yards, 1:10.**
- MIA – DeVante Parker 43-yard pass from Ryan Fitzpatrick (Jason Sanders kick), 3:05. Eagles 10–7. **Drive: 6 plays, 84 yards, 2:40.**

**Second quarter**

- PHI – Jake Elliott 43-yard field goal, 11:09. Eagles 13–7. **Drive: 12 plays, 50 yards, 6:56.**
- MIA – Jason Sanders 1-yard pass from Matt Haack (Jason Sanders kick), 4:40. Dolphins 14–13. **Drive: 13 plays, 75 yards, 6:29.**
- PHI – J. J. Arcega-Whiteside 15-yard pass from Carson Wentz (Carson Wentz–Nelson Agholor pass), 0:06. Eagles 21–14. **Drive: 12 plays, 75 yards, 4:34.**

**Third quarter**

- PHI – Alshon Jeffery 10-yard pass from Carson Wentz (Jake Elliott kick), 11:44. Eagles 28–14. **Drive: 7 plays, 47 yards, 3:16.**
- MIA – DeVante Parker 17-yard pass from Ryan Fitzpatrick (kick failed, wide right), 8:45. Eagles 28–20. **Drive: 6 plays, 75 yards, 2:59.**
- MIA – Mike Gesicki 14-yard pass from Ryan Fitzpatrick (pass failed), 1:10. Eagles 28–26. **Drive: 6 plays, 61 yards, 3:24.**

**Fourth quarter**

- MIA – Patrick Laird 4-yard run (Ryan Fitzpatrick–Patrick Laird pass), 1:06. Dolphins 34–28. **Drive: 9 plays, 96 yards, 3:36.**
- MIA – Jason Sanders 51-yard field goal, 3:37. Dolphins 37–28. **Drive: 13 plays, 50 yards, 5:53.**
- PHI – Jake Elliott 37-yard field goal, 1:51. Dolphins 37–31. **Drive: 7 plays, 56 yards, 1:46.**

**Top passers**

- PHI – Carson Wentz – 28/46, 310 yards, 3 TD, INT
- MIA – Ryan Fitzpatrick – 27/39, 365 yards, 3 TD, INT

**Top rushers**

- PHI – Miles Sanders – 17 rushes, 83 yards
- MIA – Patrick Laird – 10 rushes, 5 yards, TD

**Top receivers**

- PHI – Alshon Jeffery – 9 receptions, 137 yards, TD
- MIA – DeVante Parker – 7 receptions, 159 yards, 2 TD

In one of the most embarrassing road losses in franchise history, the Eagles blew a 28–14 3rd quarter lead and lost to the Miami Dolphins 37–31. They allowed over 365 total yards of offense, and with this loss, tied their loss total from the previous season.

==== Week 14: vs. New York Giants ====
Week Fourteen: New York Giants at Philadelphia Eagles – Game summary

Quarter	1	2	3	4	OT	Total
Giants	0	17	0	0	0	**17**
**Eagles**	0	3	7	7	6	**23**

at Lincoln Financial Field, Philadelphia, Pennsylvania

- Date: December 9
- Game time: 8:15 pm. EST
- Game weather: Rain, 53 °F (12 °C)
- Game attendance: 69,796
- Referee: Scott Novak
- TV announcers (ESPN): Joe Tessitore, Booger McFarland and Lisa Salters
- Recap, Game Book

Game information

**First quarter**

- No scoring plays.

**Second quarter**

- NYG – Darius Slayton 35-yard pass from Eli Manning (Aldrick Rosas kick), 14:52. Giants 7–0. **Drive: 7 plays, 57 yards, 3:05.**
- PHI – Jake Elliott 34-yard field goal, 9:33. Giants 7–3. **Drive: 9 plays, 59 yards, 5:19.**
- NYG – Aldrick Rosas 34-yard field goal, 5:30. Giants 10–3. **Drive: 9 plays, 59 yards, 4:03.**
- NYG – Darius Slayton 55-yard pass from Eli Manning (Aldrick Rosas kick), 0:27. Giants 17–3. **Drive: 6 plays, 84 yards, 1:19.**

**Third quarter**

- PHI – Boston Scott 2-yard run (Jake Elliott kick), 1:28. Giants 17–10. **Drive: 10 plays, 58 yards, 5:39.**

**Fourth quarter**

- PHI – Zach Ertz 2-yard pass from Carson Wentz (Jake Elliott kick), 1:53. Tied 17–17. **Drive: 14 plays, 85 yards, 6:17.**

**Overtime**

- PHI – Zach Ertz 2-yard pass from Carson Wentz, 5:10. Eagles 23–17. **Drive: 8 plays, 75 yards, 4:50.**

**Top passers**

- NYG – Eli Manning – 15/30, 203 yards, 2 TD
- PHI – Carson Wentz – 33/50, 325 yards, 2 TD

**Top rushers**

- NYG – Saquon Barkley – 17 rushes, 66 yards
- PHI – Miles Sanders – 15 rushes, 45 yards

**Top receivers**

- NYG – Darius Slayton – 5 receptions, 154 yards, 2 TD
- PHI – Zach Ertz – 9 receptions, 91 yards, 2 TD

Week 14 featured the Eagles facing the rival New York Giants, led by Eli Manning, who was taking over for an injured Daniel Jones. Following a scoreless first quarter, Manning opened the scoring with a 35-yard touchdown pass to Darius Slayton, giving New York a 7–0 lead. After the teams traded field goals, Manning would throw another touchdown pass to Slayton, this time from 55 yards, to build the Giants' lead to 17–3 before halftime. However, Philadelphia's defense would stifle Manning in the second half, forcing three-and-outs on four of six possessions and allowing just 30 yards total offense. The Eagles offense would step up and score 14 unanswered points over the final two-quarters to force overtime. After the Eagles won the overtime coin toss, they drove down the field and won the game on Carson Wentz's second touchdown pass of the night to Zach Ertz. With the comeback win, the Eagles improved to 6–7 on the year. Further, the Eagles won their sixth straight against the Giants, and took the lead in the all-time series for the first time in franchise history. It also marked the first time since 2006 an Eagles-Giants game would go to overtime.

==== Week 15: at Washington Redskins ====
Week Fifteen: Philadelphia Eagles at Washington Redskins – Game summary

Quarter	1	2	3	4	Total
**Eagles**	3	7	7	20	**37**
Redskins	7	7	0	13	**27**

at FedEx Field, Landover, Maryland

- Date: December 15
- Game time: 1:00 pm. EST
- Game weather: Sunny, 52 °F (11 °C)
- Game attendance: 63,246
- Referee: Shawn Smith
- TV announcers (Fox): Thom Brennaman, Chris Spielman and Shannon Spake
- Recap, Game Book

Game information

**First quarter**

- PHI - Jake Elliott 25-yard field goal, 1:23. Eagles 3-0. **Drive: 16 plays, 88 yards, 7:40.**
- WAS - Terry McLaurin 75-yard pass from Dwayne Haskins (Dustin Hopkins kick), 1:11. Redskins 7-3. **Drive: 1 play, 75 yards, 0:12.**

**Second quarter**

- PHI - Miles Sanders 1-yard run (Jake Elliott kick), 9:53. Eagles 10-7. **Drive: 10 plays, 75 yards, 6:18.**
- WAS - Steven Sims 5-yard pass from Dwayne Haskins (Dustin Hopkins kick), 6:58. Redskins 14-10. **Drive: 7 plays, 75 yards, 2:55.**

**Third quarter**

- PHI - Miles Sanders 15-yard pass from Carson Wentz (Jake Elliott kick), 5:53. Eagles 17-14. **Drive: 12 plays, 66 yards, 6:02.**

**Fourth quarter**

- WAS - Adrian Peterson 10-yard run (Dustin Hopkins kick), 14:53. Redskins 21-17. **Drive: 10 plays, 75 yards, 6:00.**
- PHI - Zach Ertz 2-yard pass from Carson Wentz (Jake Elliott kick), 9:59. Eagles 24-21. **Drive: 8 plays, 75 yards, 4:54.**
- WAS - Dustin Hopkins 53-yard field goal, 8:02. Tied 24-24. **Drive: 6 plays, 20 yards, 1:57.**
- WAS - Dustin Hopkins 43-yard field goal, 4:52. Redskins 27-24. **Drive: 4 plays, 9 yards, 1:36.**
- PHI - Greg Ward 4-yard pass from Carson Wentz (Jake Elliott kick), 0:26. Eagles, 31-27. **Drive: 11 plays, 75 yards, 4:26.**
- PHI - Nigel Bradham 48-yard fumble return, 0:00. Eagles 37-27.

**Top passers**

- PHI - Carson Wentz - 30/43, 266 yards, 3 TD
- WAS - Dwayne Haskins - 19/28, 261 yards, 2 TD

**Top rushers**

- PHI - Miles Sanders - 19 rushes, 122 yards, TD
- WAS - Adrian Peterson - 16 rushes, 66 yards, TD

**Top receivers**

- PHI - Greg Ward - 7 receptions, 61 yards, TD
- WAS - Terry McLaurin - 5 receptions, 130 yards, TD

==== Week 16: vs. Dallas Cowboys ====
Week Sixteen: Dallas Cowboys at Philadelphia Eagles – Game summary

Quarter	1	2	3	4	Total
Cowboys	0	6	0	3	**9**
**Eagles**	10	0	7	0	**17**

at Lincoln Financial Field, Philadelphia, Pennsylvania

- Date: December 22
- Game time: 4:25 pm. EST
- Game weather: Clear, 47 °F (8 °C)
- Game attendance: 69,796
- Referee: Tony Corrente
- TV announcers (Fox): Joe Buck, Troy Aikman and Erin Andrews
- Recap, Game Book

Game information

**First quarter**

- PHI – Jake Elliott 36-yard field goal, 9:32. Eagles 3–0. **Drive: 11 plays, 57 yards, 5:28.**
- PHI – Dallas Goedert 6-yard pass from Carson Wentz (Jake Elliott kick), 4:03. Eagles 10–0. **Drive: 7 plays, 63 yards, 3:50.**

**Second quarter**

- DAL – Kai Forbath 49-yard field goal, 12:56. Eagles 10–3. **Drive: 7 plays, 48 yards, 2:20.**
- DAL – Kai Forbath 32-yard field goal, 0:03. Eagles 10–6. **Drive: 5 plays, 43 yards, 0:26.**

**Third quarter**

- PHI – Miles Sanders 1-yard run (Jake Elliott kick), 0:06. Eagles 17–6. **Drive: 10 plays, 80 yards, 4:39.**

**Fourth quarter**

- DAL – Kai Forbath 49-yard field goal, 7:59. Eagles 17–9. **Drive: 8 plays, 24 yards, 2:59.**

**Top passers**

- DAL – Dak Prescott – 25/44, 265 yards
- PHI – Carson Wentz – 31/40, 319 yards, TD

**Top rushers**

- DAL – Ezekiel Elliott – 13 rushes, 47 yards
- PHI – Miles Sanders – 20 rushes, 79 yards, TD

**Top receivers**

- DAL – Ezekiel Elliott – 7 receptions, 37 yards
- PHI – Dallas Goedert – 9 receptions, 91 yards, TD

The Eagles won against the Cowboys after losing to them in Week 7. This resulted in the Eagles taking the lead in the NFC East for the first time this season and a 4-loss streak for the Cowboys. The victory improved Philadelphia to 8–7. The Eagles needed to either beat the NY Giants the next week or have the Cowboys lose to the Redskins.

==== Week 17: at New York Giants ====
Week Seventeen: Philadelphia Eagles at New York Giants – Game summary

Quarter	1	2	3	4	Total
**Eagles**	3	7	7	17	**34**
Giants	0	3	14	0	**17**

at MetLife Stadium, East Rutherford, New Jersey

- Date: December 29
- Game time: 4:25 pm. EST
- Game weather: Rain, 42 °F (6 °C)
- Game attendance: 75,029
- Referee: Alex Kemp
- TV announcers (Fox): Thom Brennaman, Chris Spielman and Shannon Spake
- Recap, Game Book

Game information

**First quarter**

- PHI – Jake Elliott 31-yard field goal, 3:39. Eagles 3–0. **Drive: 9 plays, 69 yards, 4:19.**

**Second quarter**

- NYG – Aldrick Rosas 37-yard field goal, 5:16. Tied 3–3. **Drive: 7 plays, 67 yards, 2:10.**
- PHI – Joshua Perkins 24-yard pass from Carson Wentz (Jake Elliott kick), 1:52. Eagles 10–3. **Drive: 8 plays, 75 yards, 3:24.**

**Third quarter**

- NYG – Golden Tate 20-yard pass from Daniel Jones (Aldrick Rosas kick), 9:41. Tied 10–10. **Drive: 10 plays, 76 yards, 5:19.**
- PHI – Boston Scott 7-yard run (Jake Elliott kick), 2:21. Eagles 17–10. **Drive: 9 plays, 62 yards, 3:11.**
- NYG – Saquon Barkley 68-yard run (Aldrick Rosas kick), 2:05. Tied 17–17. **Drive: 1 play, 68 yards, 0:16.**

**Fourth quarter**

- PHI – Jake Elliott 50-yard field goal, 13:58. Eagles 20–17. **Drive: 8 plays, 43 yards, 3:07.**
- PHI – Boston Scott 2-yard run (Jake Elliott kick), 13:00. Eagles 27–17. **Drive: 1 play, 2 yards, 0:03.**
- PHI – Boston Scott 2-yard run (Jake Elliott kick), 6:14. Eagles 34–17. **Drive: 4 plays, 38 yards, 1:39.**

**Top passers**

- PHI – Carson Wentz – 23/40, 289 yards, TD
- NYG – Daniel Jones – 28/47, 301 yards, TD, INT

**Top rushers**

- PHI – Boston Scott – 19 rushes, 54 yards, 3 TD
- NYG – Saquon Barkley – 17 rushes, 92 yards, TD

**Top receivers**

- PHI – Boston Scott – 4 receptions, 84 yards
- NYG – Kaden Smith – 8 receptions, 98 yards

The Eagles clinched their second NFC East division title in three years with a win over the New York Giants, their seventh straight in the series dating back to the 2016 season.

=== Standings ===
==== Division ====
NFC East
	W	L	T	PCT	DIV	CONF	PF	PA	STK
^{(4)} Philadelphia Eagles	9	7	0	.563	5–1	7–5	385	354	W4
Dallas Cowboys	8	8	0	.500	5–1	7–5	434	321	W1
New York Giants	4	12	0	.250	2–4	3–9	341	451	L1
Washington Redskins	3	13	0	.188	0–6	2–10	266	435	L4

==== Conference ====
NFC
#	Team	Division	W	L	T	PCT	DIV	CONF	SOS	SOV	STK
**Division leaders**
1 (Note: San Francisco finished ahead of Green Bay and New Orleans based on head-to-head sweep, claiming the No. 1 seed.)	San Francisco 49ers	West	13	3	0	.813	5–1	10–2	.504	.466	W2
2 (Note: Green Bay claimed the No. 2 seed over New Orleans based on conference record.)	Green Bay Packers	North	13	3	0	.813	6–0	10–2	.453	.428	W5
3	New Orleans Saints	South	13	3	0	.813	5–1	9–3	.486	.459	W3
4	Philadelphia Eagles	East	9	7	0	.563	5–1	7–5	.455	.417	W4
**Wild Cards**
5	Seattle Seahawks	West	11	5	0	.688	3–3	8–4	.531	.463	L2
6	Minnesota Vikings	North	10	6	0	.625	2–4	7–5	.477	.356	L2
**Did not qualify for the postseason**
7	Los Angeles Rams	West	9	7	0	.563	3–3	7–5	.535	.438	W1
8 (Note: Chicago finished ahead of Dallas based on head-to-head victory.)	Chicago Bears	North	8	8	0	.500	4–2	7–5	.508	.383	W1
9	Dallas Cowboys	East	8	8	0	.500	5–1	7–5	.479	.316	W1
10 (Note: Atlanta finished ahead of Tampa Bay based on division record.)	Atlanta Falcons	South	7	9	0	.438	4–2	6–6	.545	.518	W4
11	Tampa Bay Buccaneers	South	7	9	0	.438	2–4	5–7	.500	.384	L2
12	Arizona Cardinals	West	5	10	1	.344	1–5	3–8–1	.529	.375	L1
13	Carolina Panthers	South	5	11	0	.313	1–5	2–10	.549	.469	L8
14	New York Giants	East	4	12	0	.250	2–4	3–9	.473	.281	L1
15	Detroit Lions	North	3	12	1	.219	0–6	2–9–1	.506	.375	L9
16	Washington Redskins	East	3	13	0	.188	0–6	2–10	.502	.281	L4
**Tiebreakers** (Note: When breaking ties for three or more teams under the NFL's rules, they are first broken within divisions, then comparing only the highest-ranked remaining team from each division.)

== Postseason ==
=== Schedule ===
Round	Date	Opponent (seed)	Result	Record	Venue	Recap
Wild Card	January 5, 2020	Seattle Seahawks (5)	L 9–17	0–1	Lincoln Financial Field	Recap

=== Game summaries ===
==== NFC Wild Card Playoffs: vs. (5) Seattle Seahawks ====
NFC Wild Card Playoffs: (5) Seattle Seahawks at (4) Philadelphia Eagles – Game summary

Quarter	1	2	3	4	Total
Seahawks	3	7	7	0	17
Eagles	0	3	6	0	9

at Lincoln Financial Field, Philadelphia, Pennsylvania

- Date: January 5, 2020
- Game time: 4:40 p.m. EST
- Game weather: Cloudy, 41 °F (5 °C)
- Game attendance: 69,796
- Referee: Shawn Smith
- TV announcers (NBC): Al Michaels, Cris Collinsworth and Michele Tafoya
- Recap, Game Book

Game information

First quarter

- SEA – Jason Myers 49-yard field goal, 1:29. Seahawks 3–0. Drive: 10 plays, 46 yards, 4:48.

Second quarter

- PHI – Jake Elliott 46-yard field goal, 2:53. Tied 3–3. Drive: 13 plays, 64 yards, 5:53.
- SEA – Marshawn Lynch 5-yard run (Jason Myers kick), 1:06. Seahawks 10–3. Drive: 9 plays, 82 yards, 1:47.

Third quarter

- PHI – Jake Elliott 26-yard field goal, 10:36. Seahawks 10–6. Drive: 7 plays, 67 yards, 4:24.
- SEA – DK Metcalf 53-yard pass from Russell Wilson (Jason Myers kick), 8:46. Seahawks 17–6. Drive: 5 plays, 81 yards, 1:50.
- PHI – Jake Elliott 38-yard field goal, 2:49. Seahawks 17–9. Drive: 11 plays, 55 yards, 5:57.

Fourth quarter

- No scoring plays.

Top passers

- SEA – Russell Wilson – 18/30, 325 yards, TD
- PHI – Josh McCown – 18/24, 174 yards

Top rushers

- SEA – Russell Wilson – 9 rushes, 45 yards
- PHI – Miles Sanders – 14 rushes, 69 yards

Top receivers

- SEA – DK Metcalf – 7 receptions, 160 yards, TD
- PHI – Dallas Goedert – 7 receptions, 73 yards

The Eagles season ended with their first loss at home since Week 12 of the regular season, which was, coincidentally, also a 17–9 home loss to the Seahawks. They failed to score a touchdown for the first time since Week 17 of the 2017 season. Carson Wentz left the game in the first quarter with a concussion following a controversial hit by Jadeveon Clowney. No penalty was called on the play, and Wentz was later ruled out for the game. This was the Eagles' third straight home Wild Card playoff loss.
