= Hassan Ridgeway =

American football player (born 1994)

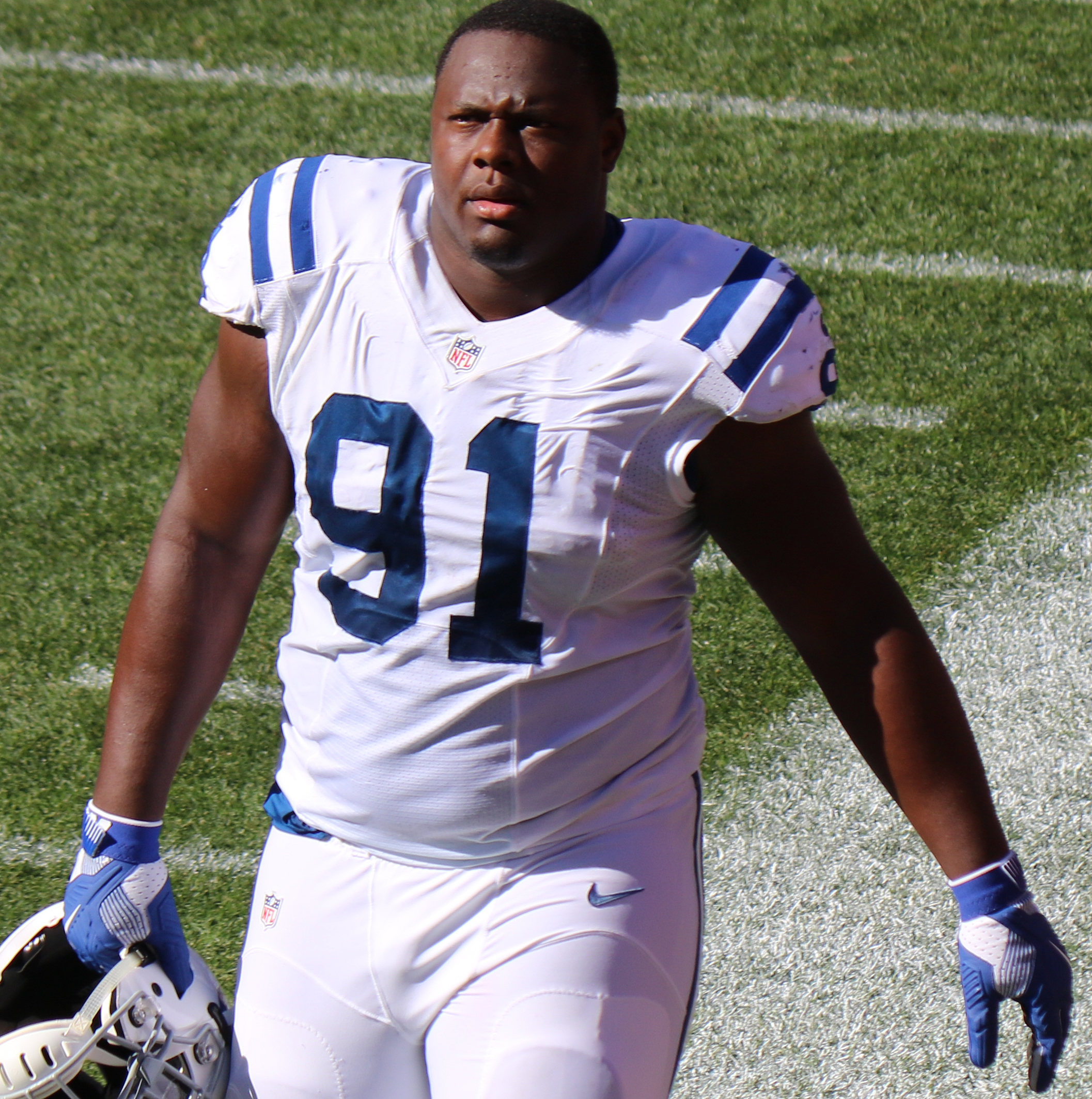
- Ridgeway with the Indianapolis Colts in 2016

Profile
- Position: Defensive tackle

Personal information
- Born: November 2, 1994 (age 32); Richmond, California, U.S.
- Listed height: 6 ft 3 in (1.91 m)
- Listed weight: 305 lb (138 kg)

Career information
- High school: Mansfield (Mansfield, Texas)
- College: Texas (2012–2015)
- NFL draft: 2016: 4th round, 116th overall pick

Career history
- Indianapolis Colts (2016–2018); Philadelphia Eagles (2019–2021); San Francisco 49ers (2022); Houston Texans (2023)

Career NFL statistics as of 2023
- Total tackles: 114
- Sacks: 10.5
- Forced fumbles: 1
- Stats at Pro Football Reference

Hassan Ridgeway (born November 2, 1994) is an American professional football defensive tackle. He played college football for the Texas Longhorns, and was selected by the Indianapolis Colts in the fourth round (116th overall) of the 2016 NFL draft.

== Early life ==
Ridgeway attended Mansfield High School in Mansfield, Texas. He committed to the University of Texas at Austin to play college football.

== College career ==
Ridgeway played at Texas from 2012 to 2015. During his career, he played in 36 games with 18 starts, recording 92 tackles and 9.5 sacks. After his junior year he entered the 2016 NFL draft.

== Professional career ==
Pre-draft measurables
Height	Weight	Arm length	Hand span	40-yard dash	10-yard split	20-yard split	20-yard shuttle	Three-cone drill	Vertical jump	Broad jump	Bench press
6 ft 3 3/8 in (1.91 m)	303 lb (137 kg)	33 in (0.84 m)	9 3/8 in (0.24 m)	5.02 s	1.71 s	2.88 s	4.69 s	7.37 s	32 in (0.81 m)	9 ft 5 in (2.87 m)	24 reps

=== Indianapolis Colts ===
Ridgeway was drafted in the fourth round (116th overall) of the 2016 NFL Draft by the Indianapolis Colts. He signed his rookie contract with the Colts on May 5, 2016. In his first three years with the Colts, Ridgeway played in 34 games, recording 41 tackles and 4.5 sacks.

=== Philadelphia Eagles ===
On April 27, 2019, Ridgeway was traded to the Philadelphia Eagles for a seventh round pick (246th overall) in the 2019 NFL draft. He began the 2019 season as a reserve, playing in the first two games behind Fletcher Cox and Malik Jackson. Jackson suffered a foot injury in week 1 and replacement Timmy Jernigan also suffered a foot injury in week 2, which led to Ridgeway starting the next five games alongside Cox. In a week 7 game against the Dallas Cowboys, Ridgeway suffered an ankle injury that caused him to be placed on injured reserve on October 23, 2019.

Ridgeway re-signed with the Eagles on a one-year contract on March 24, 2020. In week 7 against the Giants, Ridgeway suffered a bicep injury and was placed on injured reserve on October 26.

On March 18, 2021, Ridgeway re-signed with the Eagles.

=== San Francisco 49ers ===
On March 21, 2022, Ridgeway signed a one-year contract with the San Francisco 49ers. In Week 13 against the Miami Dolphins, Ridgeway suffered a pectoral strain and was rule out for 6–8 weeks, ending his regular season.

=== Houston Texans ===
On March 18, 2023, Ridgeway signed a one-year contract with the Houston Texans. He played 2 plays in the first game and was placed on the injured reserve with a calf injury on September 13, 2023. He was activated on October 28 and played in two games before being injured again. He was placed back on injured reserve on November 7 after suffering a torn Achilles in Week 9 and did not return to the roster that season.

After the 2023 season he was a free agent, but went unsigned.

== Career statistics ==
Year	Team	Games		Tackles				Interceptions						Fumbles			
Year	Team	GP	GS	Comb	Solo	Ast	Sack	Int	Yards	Avg	Lng	TD	PD	FF	FR	Yards	TD
2016	IND	16	5	21	8	13	1.5	0	0	0.0	0	0	1	0	0	0	0
2017	IND	13	1	14	5	9	3.0	0	0	0.0	0	0	0	0	0	0	0
2018	IND	5	0	6	5	1	0.0	0	0	0.0	0	0	0	0	0	0	0
2019	PHI	7	5	8	5	3	2.0	0	0	0.0	0	0	0	0	0	0	0
2020	PHI	7	0	11	9	2	1.0	0	0	0.0	0	0	0	0	0	0	0
2021	PHI	17	1	20	10	10	2.0	0	0	0.0	0	0	0	1	0	0	0
Career		65	12	80	42	38	9.5	0	0	0.0	0	0	1	1	0	0	0
