= Sua Opeta =

American football player (born 1996)

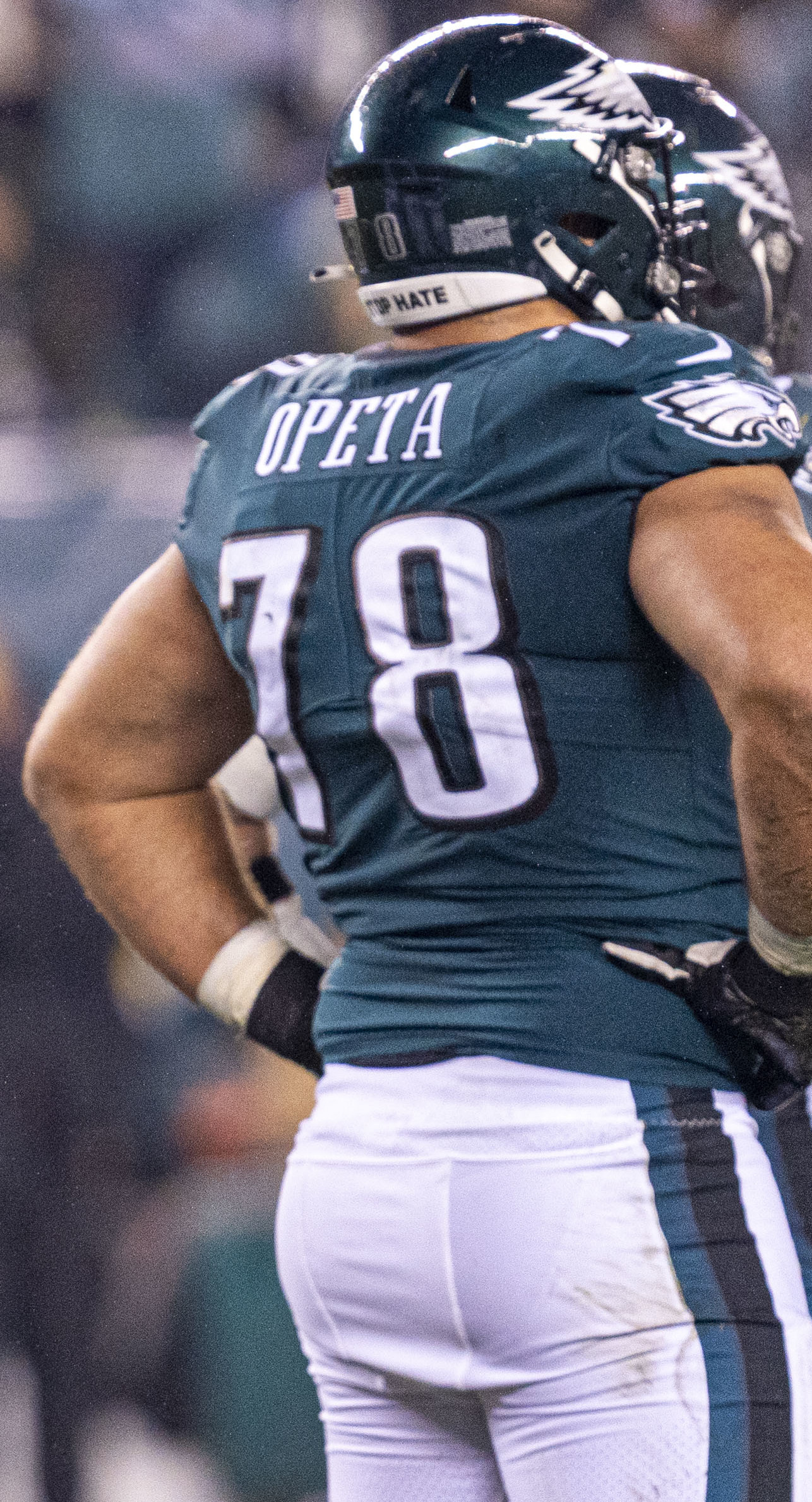
- Opeta with the Philadelphia Eagles in 2021

Profile
- Position: Guard

Personal information
- Born: August 15, 1996 (age 30); Bountiful, Utah, U.S.
- Listed height: 6 ft 4 in (1.93 m)
- Listed weight: 305 lb (138 kg)

Career information
- High school: Stansbury Park
- College: Weber State (2014–2018)
- NFL draft: 2019: undrafted

Career history
- Philadelphia Eagles (2019–2023); Tampa Bay Buccaneers (2024–2025); Philadelphia Eagles (2025)*
- * Offseason or practice squad member only

Awards and highlights
- 2× First-team All-Big Sky (2017, 2018)

Career NFL statistics as of 2024
- Games played: 38
- Games started: 10
- Stats at Pro Football Reference

Iosua Opeta (born August 15, 1996) is an American professional football guard. After playing college football for the Weber State Wildcats, he was signed by the Philadelphia Eagles as an undrafted free agent in 2019.

== Early life ==
Opeta was born in Utah and grew up in Stansbury Park after moving to the town when he was eight. He began playing football at the age of ten. In high school, Opeta played defense and offense. He signed with Weber State over an offer from Southern Utah because Weber State wanted him on the defensive line.

== College career ==
Opeta was a member of the Weber State Wildcats for five seasons, redshirting as a true freshman. He played defensive tackle as a redshirt freshman before moving to the offensive line during the following offseason because he was promised a starting role. In his first year as an offensive lineman, Opeta was an honorable mention All-Big Sky Conference. Opeta was named an FCS All-American twice. He was named to the NFLPA Collegiate Bowl.

== Professional career ==
Pre-draft measurables
Height	Weight	Arm length	Hand span	40-yard dash	10-yard split	20-yard split	20-yard shuttle	Three-cone drill	Vertical jump	Broad jump	Bench press
6 ft 4 1/4 in (1.94 m)	301 lb (137 kg)	33 1/4 in (0.84 m)	9 7/8 in (0.25 m)	5.02 s	1.66 s	2.85 s	4.73 s	8.06 s	33.0 in (0.84 m)	9 ft 4 in (2.84 m)	39 reps

At the NFL Scouting Combine, Opeta put up 39 reps of 225 pounds on bench press, the most out of any offensive linemen.

=== Philadelphia Eagles ===
After going undrafted in 2019, Opeta was signed by the Philadelphia Eagles for training camp. He spent the first 12 weeks on the practice squad. On December 3, he was promoted to the active roster.

On September 5, 2020, Opeta was waived by the Eagles and was signed to their practice squad the next day. He was elevated to the active roster on September 12 for the team's Week 1 game against the Washington Football Team and reverted to the practice squad on September 14. He was promoted to the active roster on September 15. He was placed on injured reserve on November 28, 2020.

On August 31, 2021, Opeta was waived by the Eagles and re-signed to the practice squad the next day. He was signed to the active roster on September 29, 2021.

Opeta played in seven games for the Eagles in 2022, and was made a healthy scratch for the team’s Week 17 game against the New Orleans Saints. He was waived by the team on January 6, 2023, prior to the team’s season finale against the New York Giants, and re-signed to the practice squad. On February 15, Opeta signed a reserve/future contract with the Eagles.

=== Tampa Bay Buccaneers ===
On March 15, 2024, Opeta signed with the Tampa Bay Buccaneers. On July 31, it was announced that Opeta had suffered a torn ACL in practice. He was placed on injured reserve two days later, ending his season.

On March 25, 2025, Opeta re-signed with the Buccaneers. He was released on August 26 as part of final roster cuts. On September 18, Opeta was re-signed to the practice squad; he was released by the team on October 7.

=== Philadelphia Eagles (second stint) ===
On October 22, 2025, Opeta was signed to the Philadelphia Eagles' practice squad. On November 3, Opeta was released by the Eagles.
