= 2017 Philadelphia Eagles season =

85th season in franchise history; third Super Bowl appearance; first Super Bowl win

- Owner: Jeffrey Lurie
- General manager: Howie Roseman
- Head coach: Doug Pederson
- Offensive coordinator: Frank Reich
- Defensive coordinator: Jim Schwartz
- Home stadium: Lincoln Financial Field

Results
- Record: 13–3
- Division place: 1st NFC East
- Playoffs: Won Divisional Playoffs (vs. Falcons) 15–10; Won NFC Championship (vs. Vikings) 38–7; Won Super Bowl LII (vs. Patriots) 41–33
- All-Pros: 4: C Jason Kelce (1st team); RT Lane Johnson (1st team); QB Carson Wentz (2nd team); DT Fletcher Cox (2nd team)
- Pro Bowlers: 6: Selected but did not participate due to participation in Super Bowl LII: QB Carson Wentz; TE Zach Ertz; T Lane Johnson; G Brandon Brooks; DT Fletcher Cox; FS Malcolm Jenkins

Uniform
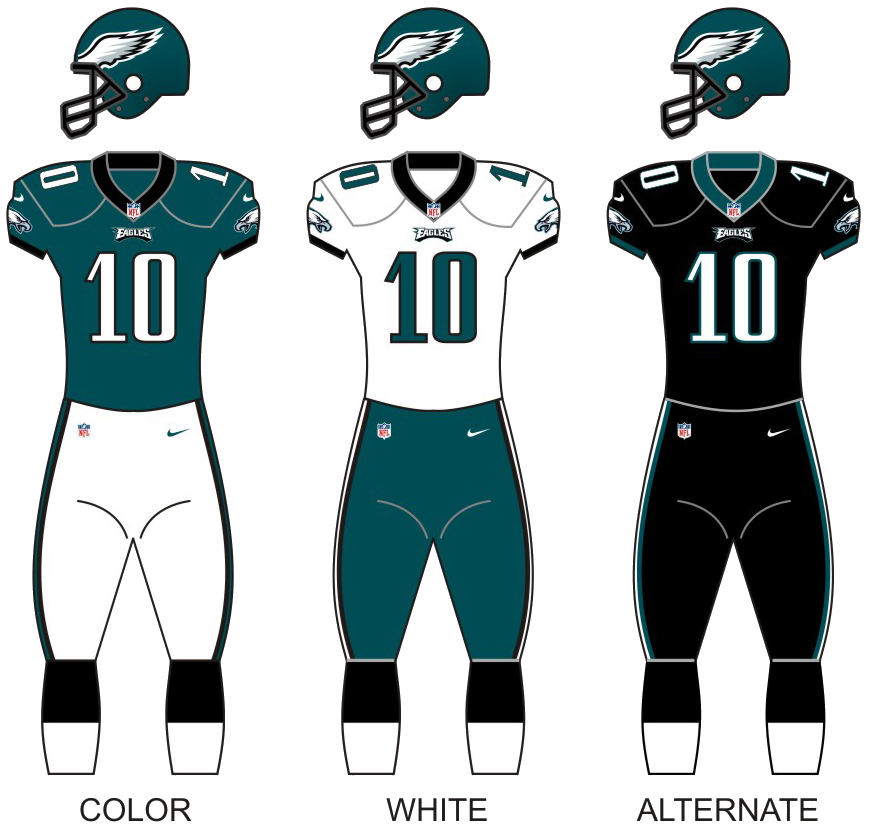

The 2017 season was the Philadelphia Eagles' 85th in the National Football League (NFL), their 15th playing their home games at Lincoln Financial Field and their second under head coach Doug Pederson. Philadelphia won its first-ever Super Bowl title, upsetting the defending champion New England Patriots in Super Bowl LII. The victory secured their first NFL title since 1960 and fourth overall, snapping a 57-year championship drought which was the third longest in the league at that time.

After a 2–1 start, the Eagles won 9 consecutive games, tying a franchise record set in 2003. Following a 51–23 win over the Denver Broncos in Week 9, the Eagles improved on their 7–9 record from 2016. Philadelphia eventually finished the regular season 13–3, tying the franchise record for most regular season wins, set in 2004. Second year quarterback Carson Wentz had a strong season, throwing for 3,296 passing yards, 33 touchdowns, and just 7 interceptions in 13 starts.

With a win against the Los Angeles Rams in Week 14, the Eagles clinched the NFC East division title for the first time since 2013. However, the victory came with the loss of Carson Wentz to a torn ACL. Wentz had been a leading favorite for the NFL MVP award, and his devastating injury caused a widespread belief that the Eagles were no longer a serious contender. Backup quarterback Nick Foles would take Wentz's place for the remainder of the season. A close win against the New York Giants in Week 15 helped the Eagles clinch a first-round bye for the first time in 13 years, and a Christmas Day home win over the Oakland Raiders allowed the Eagles to clinch home-field advantage throughout the playoffs for the first time since 2004.

Despite being heavy underdogs, the Eagles defeated the Atlanta Falcons 15–10 in the Divisional Round and routed the Minnesota Vikings 38–7 in the NFC Championship Game. The win against the Falcons in the Divisional Round was their first playoff win since 2008, and their first at home since 2006. Philadelphia advanced to Super Bowl LII, their first appearance in the Super Bowl since 2004.

In a rematch of Super Bowl XXXIX, the Eagles defeated the Patriots by a score of 41–33. The game saw 1,151 yards of offense from both teams combined, the most for a single game in NFL history. Backup quarterback Nick Foles was named Super Bowl MVP, having thrown for 373 yards and totaling 4 touchdowns. Philadelphia defeated both Super Bowl teams from the previous NFL season (the Patriots and Atlanta Falcons) in the playoffs. The Eagles also defeated both teams who had beaten them in their previous Super Bowl appearances: the Oakland Raiders in the regular season, who beat them in Super Bowl XV, and the Patriots in Super Bowl LII, who beat them in Super Bowl XXXIX. The Eagles became the first team since the 1995 Dallas Cowboys to avenge a Super Bowl loss against a team that defeated them in a prior Super Bowl matchup. Philadelphia repeated that feat in winning another Super Bowl in 2024.

== Roster changes ==
=== Free agents ===
Position	Player	Tag	2017 Team	Notes
RB	Kenjon Barner	UFA	Philadelphia Eagles	Signed 1-year deal
DE	Bryan Braman	UFA	Philadelphia Eagles	Signed 1-year deal
TE	Trey Burton	RFA	Philadelphia Eagles	Signed 1-year tender
CB	Nolan Carroll	UFA	Dallas Cowboys	Signed 3-year deal
LB	Najee Goode	RFA	Philadelphia Eagles	Signed 1-year deal
DT	Bennie Logan	UFA	Kansas City Chiefs	Signed 1-year deal
LB	Stephen Tulloch	UFA	Retired	
S	Jaylen Watkins	RFA	Philadelphia Eagles	Signed 1-year deal
RB	Terrell Watson	UFA	Pittsburgh Steelers	Signed 1-year deal
C	Stefen Wisniewski	UFA	Philadelphia Eagles	Signed 3-year deal

Player re-signed by the Eagles

=== Free agent signings ===
Position	Player	Tag	2016 Team	Date signed	Notes
WR	Torrey Smith	UFA	San Francisco 49ers	March 9	Signed 3-year/$15 million deal
WR	Alshon Jeffery	UFA	Chicago Bears	March 9	Signed 1-year/$14 million deal
OG	Chance Warmack	UFA	Tennessee Titans	March 9	Signed 1-year/$1.51 million deal
QB	Nick Foles	UFA	Kansas City Chiefs	March 13	Signed 2-year/$11 million deal
DE	Chris Long	UFA	New England Patriots	March 28	Signed 2-year deal
CB	Patrick Robinson	UFA	Indianapolis Colts	March 28	Signed 1-year deal
QB	Matt McGloin	UFA	Oakland Raiders	April 10	Signed 1-year/$800k deal
RB	LeGarrette Blount	UFA	New England Patriots	May 17	Signed 1-year/$2.8 million deal

=== Departures ===
Position	Player	Age	2017 Team
CB	Nolan Carroll	30	Dallas Cowboys
OLB	Connor Barwin	30	Los Angeles Rams
DT	Bennie Logan	27	Kansas City Chiefs
QB	Chase Daniel	30	New Orleans Saints
QB	Aaron Murray	26	Los Angeles Rams
CB	Leodis McKelvin	31	FA
WR	Dorial Green-Beckham	24	FA
DE	Marcus Smith II	25	Seattle Seahawks
RB	Ryan Mathews	29	FA

=== Trades ===
- April 4: The Eagles traded the 74th pick in the 2017 NFL draft to the Baltimore Ravens to acquire Timmy Jernigan and the 99th pick in the 2017 NFL draft.
- July 26: Guard Allen Barbre was traded to the Denver Broncos in exchange for a 2019 seventh-round draft selection.
- August 11: The Eagles traded wide receiver Jordan Matthews and their 2018 third-round draft selection to the Buffalo Bills in exchange for cornerback Ronald Darby.
- August 28: Long snapper Jon Dorenbos was traded to the New Orleans Saints in exchange for a 2019 seventh-round draft selection, which was later rescinded after Dorenbos needed heart surgery.
- October 31: At the trade deadline, the Eagles traded a 2018 4th round draft pick to the Miami Dolphins for running back Jay Ajayi.

== Draft ==
2017 Philadelphia Eagles draft
Round	Pick	Player	Position	College	Notes
1	14	Derek Barnett	DE	Tennessee	
2	43	Sidney Jones	CB	Washington	
3	99	Rasul Douglas	CB	West Virginia	
4	118	Mack Hollins	WR	North Carolina	
4	132	Donnel Pumphrey	RB	San Diego St	
5	166	Shelton Gibson	WR	West Virginia	
5	184	Nathan Gerry	LB	Nebraska	
6	214	Elijah Qualls	DT	Washington	
Made roster † Pro Football Hall of Fame * Made at least one Pro Bowl during career

Notes

- The Eagles traded their original 2017 first-round selection (No. 12 overall), their first-, third- and fourth-round selections in 2016, as well as a 2018 second-round selection to the Cleveland Browns, in exchange for the Browns' 2016 first-round selection and the Browns fourth-round compensatory selection (No. 139 overall).
- The Eagles acquired an additional first-round selection, along with a 2018 fourth-round selection in a trade that sent quarterback Sam Bradford to the Minnesota Vikings.
- The Eagles traded their third-round selection (No. 74 overall) to the Baltimore Ravens for DT Timmy Jernigan and one of the Ravens third-round selections (No. 99 overall).

Undrafted Free Agents
Player	Position	College
Tyler Orlosky	C	West Virginia
Billy Brown	TE	Shepherd
Victor Salako	OT	Oklahoma State
Greg Ward Jr.	WR	Houston
Cameron Johnston	P	Ohio State
Corey Clement	RB	Wisconsin
Winston Craig	DT	Richmond
Jomal Wiltz	CB	Iowa State
Tre Sullivan	S	Shepherd
Randall Goforth	CB	UCLA
Jerod Evans	QB	Virginia Tech
Charles Walker	DT	Oklahoma

== Staff ==
2017 Philadelphia Eagles staff
Front office: Chairman/CEO – Jeffrey Lurie; President – Don Smolenski; Executive vice president of football operations – Howie Roseman; Senior football advisor – Tom Donahoe; Vice president of player personnel – Joe Douglas; Assistant director of player personnel – Andy Weidl; Vice president of football operations and strategy – Alec Halaby; Senior director of college scouting – Anthony Patch; Director of college scouting – Ian Cunningham; Assistant director of college scouting – Mike Bradway; Director of pro scouting – Dwayne Joseph; Assistant director of pro scouting – Brandon Brown; Director of football administration – Jake Rosenberg; Football operations executive – Brian Dawkins; Player personnel executive – T.J. McCreight; Player personnel executive college/pro – Trey Brown; Head coaches: Head coach – Doug Pederson; Offensive coaches: Offensive coordinator – Frank Reich; Quarterbacks – John DeFilippo; Running backs – Duce Staley; Wide receivers – Mike Groh; Tight ends – Justin Peelle; Offensive line – Jeff Stoutland; Assistant offensive line/tight ends/run game – Eugene Chung; Offensive quality control/quarterbacks – Press Taylor; Offensive quality control/offensive line – T. J. Paganetti	Defensive coaches: Defensive coordinator – Jim Schwartz; Defensive line – Chris Wilson; Linebackers – Ken Flajole; Secondary – Cory Undlin; Safeties – Tim Hauck; Defensive quality control/defensive line – Phillip Daniels; Defensive quality control/secondary – Dino Vasso; Special teams coaches: Special teams coordinator – Dave Fipp; Assistant special teams – Matthew Harper; Strength and conditioning: Head strength and conditioning – Josh Hingst; Assistant strength and conditioning – Keith Gray; Strength assistant – Ben Wagner; Director of sports science and reconditioning – Shaun Huls

== Final roster ==
2017 Philadelphia Eagles roster
Quarterbacks (QB): 9 Nick Foles; 7 Nate Sudfeld; Running backs (RB): 36 Jay Ajayi; 38 Kenjon Barner; 29 LeGarrette Blount; 30 Corey Clement; 28 Wendell Smallwood; Wide receivers (WR): 13 Nelson Agholor; 18 Shelton Gibson; 10 Mack Hollins; 17 Alshon Jeffery; 14 Marcus Johnson; 82 Torrey Smith; Tight ends (TE): 88 Trey Burton; 87 Brent Celek; 86 Zach Ertz	Offensive linemen (OL): 66 Will Beatty T; 79 Brandon Brooks G; 65 Lane Johnson T; 62 Jason Kelce C; 73 Isaac Seumalo G; 72 Halapoulivaati Vaitai T; 67 Chance Warmack G; 61 Stefen Wisniewski G; Defensive linemen (DL): 94 Beau Allen DT; 96 Derek Barnett DE; 91 Fletcher Cox DT; 75 Vinny Curry DE; 55 Brandon Graham DE; 93 Timmy Jernigan DT; 56 Chris Long DE; 51 Steven Means DE; 98 Elijah Qualls DT; 97 Destiny Vaeao DT	Linebackers (LB): 53 Nigel Bradham OLB; 50 Bryan Braman OLB; 57 Dannell Ellerbe MLB; 47 Nate Gerry OLB; 52 Najee Goode OLB; 54 Kamu Grugier-Hill OLB; 95 Mychal Kendricks OLB; Defensive backs (DB): 41 Ronald Darby CB; 32 Rasul Douglas CB; 24 Corey Graham FS; 27 Malcolm Jenkins FS; 22 Sidney Jones CB; 23 Rodney McLeod SS; 31 Jalen Mills CB; 21 Patrick Robinson CB; 26 Jaylen Watkins CB; Special teams (ST): 4 Jake Elliott K; 45 Rick Lovato LS; 8 Donnie Jones P	Practice squad: 68 Josh Andrews G; 33 De'Vante Bausby CB; 85 Billy Brown TE; 19 Rashard Davis WR; 78 Darrell Greene G; 74 Winston Craig DT; 35 D. J. Killings CB; 49 Tre Sullivan SS; 16 Bryce Treggs WR; 89 Greg Ward WR; Reserve: 37 Randall Goforth CB (IR); 58 Jordan Hicks MLB (IR); 42 Chris Maragos FS (IR); 71 Jason Peters T (IR); 34 Donnel Pumphrey RB (IR); 90 Aziz Shittu DT (IR); 43 Darren Sproles RB (IR); 6 Caleb Sturgis K (IR); 59 Joe Walker MLB (IR); 11 Carson Wentz QB (IR); 84 Dom Williams WR (IR); Rookies in italics 53 active, 11 reserve, 10 practice squad

== Preseason ==
Week	Date	Opponent	Result	Record	Venue	Recap
1	August 10	at Green Bay Packers	L 9–24	0–1	Lambeau Field	Recap
2	August 17	Buffalo Bills	W 20–16	1–1	Lincoln Financial Field	Recap
3	August 24	Miami Dolphins	W 38–31	2–1	Lincoln Financial Field	Recap
4	August 31	at New York Jets	L 10–16	2–2	MetLife Stadium	Recap

== Regular season ==
The Eagles began their 2017 season on the road against the Washington Redskins and won 30–17. However, the team lost the following week to the Kansas City Chiefs 27–20 in Doug Pederson's return to face his mentor and the team's former coach, Andy Reid. The Eagles then went on a nine-game win streak which consisted of dominant home wins over the Arizona Cardinals, San Francisco 49ers, Denver Broncos and Chicago Bears, and close road wins in Carolina and against the Chargers. However, their winning streak came to an end at the hands of the Seattle Seahawks in Week 13 by a score of 24–10 in Seattle. Philly bounced back the following week and won 43–35 over the Los Angeles Rams, which gave them the NFC East title, despite Carson Wentz tearing his ACL during the game, causing Nick Foles to finish off the game and become starter for the rest of the season. Rams quarterback Jared Goff was seen post-game walking over to Eagles head coach Doug Pederson inquiring of Carson Wentz’s welfare. In his first start against the New York Giants, the Eagles trailed 20–7, but Foles threw four touchdowns for a close 34–29 win over the Giants to help the Eagles claim a first-round bye in the 2017 postseason. Foles then began to struggle in Week 16 against the Oakland Raiders, throwing a touchdown and an interception and frequently missing his receivers. As a result, the Eagles defense and special teams had to carry the offensive line for a 19–10 win on a cold Christmas night to seal home-field advantage throughout the NFC playoffs. The Eagles went on to lose a meaningless Week 17 game to the Dallas Cowboys in a shutout score of 6–0 in Nate Sudfeld's debut as an Eagle, and they finished with a record of 13–3, tying their 2004 season for their best regular season record.

=== Schedule ===
Week	Date	Opponent	Result	Record	Venue	Recap
1	September 10	at **Washington Redskins**	**W** 30–17	1–0	FedExField	Recap
2	September 17	at Kansas City Chiefs	**L** 20–27	1–1	Arrowhead Stadium	Recap
3	September 24	**New York Giants**	**W** 27–24	2–1	Lincoln Financial Field	Recap
4	October 1	at Los Angeles Chargers	**W** 26–24	3–1	StubHub Center	Recap
5	October 8	Arizona Cardinals	**W** 34–7	4–1	Lincoln Financial Field	Recap
6	October 12	at Carolina Panthers	**W** 28–23	5–1	Bank of America Stadium	Recap
7	October 23	**Washington Redskins**	**W** 34–24	6–1	Lincoln Financial Field	Recap
8	October 29	San Francisco 49ers	**W** 33–10	7–1	Lincoln Financial Field	Recap
9	November 5	Denver Broncos	**W** 51–23	8–1	Lincoln Financial Field	Recap
10	Bye					
11	November 19	at **Dallas Cowboys**	**W** 37–9	9–1	AT&T Stadium	Recap
12	November 26	Chicago Bears	**W** 31–3	10–1	Lincoln Financial Field	Recap
13	December 3	at Seattle Seahawks	**L** 10–24	10–2	CenturyLink Field	Recap
14	December 10	at Los Angeles Rams	**W** 43–35	11–2	Los Angeles Memorial Coliseum	Recap
15	December 17	at **New York Giants**	**W** 34–29	12–2	MetLife Stadium	Recap
16	December 25	Oakland Raiders	**W** 19–10	13–2	Lincoln Financial Field	Recap
17	December 31	**Dallas Cowboys**	**L** 0–6	13–3	Lincoln Financial Field	Recap

Note: Intra-division opponents are in bold text.

=== Game summaries ===
==== Week 1: at Washington Redskins ====
Week One: Philadelphia Eagles at Washington Redskins – Game summary

Quarter	1	2	3	4	Total
**Eagles**	7	9	3	11	**30**
Redskins	0	14	3	0	**17**

at FedExField, Landover, Maryland

- Date: September 10
- Game time: 1:00 p.m. EDT
- Game weather: 67 °F (19 °C), sunny
- Game attendance: 78,685
- Referee: Brad Allen
- TV announcers (Fox): Kenny Albert, Ronde Barber and Kristina Pink
- Recap, Gamebook

Game information

**First quarter**

- PHI – Nelson Agholor 58-yard pass from Carson Wentz (Caleb Sturgis kick), 11:43. Eagles 7–0. **Drive: 3 plays, 56 yards, 1:07.**

**Second quarter**

- PHI – LeGarrette Blount 1-yard pass from Carson Wentz (Caleb Sturgis kick failed), 13:28. Eagles 13–0. **Drive: 8 plays, 39 yards, 4:20.**
- WAS – Ryan Kerrigan 24-yard interception return (Dustin Hopkins kick), 8:39. Eagles 13–7. **Drive: 0 plays, 24 yards, 0:00.**
- WAS – Chris Thompson 29-yard pass from Kirk Cousins (Dustin Hopkins kick), 1:26. Redskins 14–13. **Drive: 8 plays, 69 yards, 2:39.**
- PHI – Caleb Sturgis 50-yard field goal, 0:04. Eagles 16–14. **Drive: 10 plays, 43 yards, 1:17.**

**Third quarter**

- PHI – Caleb Sturgis 42-yard field goal, 10:42. Eagles 19–14. **Drive: 9 plays, 51 yards, 4:22.**
- WAS – Dustin Hopkins 33-yard field goal, 2:11. Eagles 19–17. **Drive: 16 plays, 66 yards, 8:32.**

**Fourth quarter**

- PHI – Caleb Sturgis 37-yard field goal, 2:02. Eagles 22–17. **Drive: 6 plays, 33 yards, 3:47.**
- PHI – Fletcher Cox 20-yard fumble return, (Alshon Jeffery 2-point pass from Carson Wentz), 1:38. Eagles 30–17. **Drive: 0 plays, 20 yards, 0:00.**

**Top passers**

- PHI – Carson Wentz – 26/39, 307 yards, 2 TD, INT
- WAS – Kirk Cousins – 23/40, 240 yards, TD, INT

**Top rushers**

- PHI – LeGarrette Blount – 14 rushes, 46 yards
- WAS – Robert Kelley – 10 rushes, 30 yards

**Top receivers**

- PHI – Zach Ertz – 8 receptions, 93 yards
- WAS – Terrelle Pryor – 6 receptions, 66 yards

The Eagles kicked off the 2017 season on the road against the Redskins. The Eagles started off with two touchdown passes from Carson Wentz to give them a 13–0 lead. (Kicker Caleb Sturgis missed an extra point after the second touchdown.) However, the Redskins came back with a Ryan Kerrigan pick six and a touchdown pass from Kirk Cousins to running back Chris Thompson to give them a 14–13 lead late in second quarter. The lead was very short lived, however, as the Eagles responded with a field goal to give them a 16–14 lead at the half. The third quarter only consisted of field goals. The Eagles led 22–17 with just over two minutes left in the game. On the Redskins' ensuing drive, Kirk Cousins fumbled the ball, which Eagles defensive tackle Fletcher Cox recovered for a touchdown to seal the victory. This was the Eagles first win against the Redskins since September 2014, ending a five-game losing streak to their division rival. This was also the Eagles first win at FedExField since 2013.

With the win, the Eagles started 1–0 for the sixth time in their last seven season openers.

==== Week 2: at Kansas City Chiefs ====
Week Two: Philadelphia Eagles at Kansas City Chiefs – Game summary

Quarter	1	2	3	4	Total
Eagles	3	0	7	10	**20**
**Chiefs**	3	3	7	14	**27**

at Arrowhead Stadium, Kansas City, Missouri

- Date: September 17
- Game time: 1:00 pm. EDT/12:00 p.m. CDT
- Game weather: 68 °F (20 °C), cloudy
- Game attendance: 74,971
- Referee: Terry McAulay
- TV announcers (Fox): Kevin Burkhardt, Charles Davis and Pam Oliver
- Recap, Gamebook

Game information

**First quarter**

- KC – Cairo Santos 34-yard field goal, 11:22. Chiefs 3–0. **Drive: 8 plays, 73 yards, 3:38.**
- PHI – Jake Elliott 34-yard field goal, 4:28. Tied 3–3. **Drive: 11 plays, 63 yards, 6:54.**

**Second quarter**

- KC – Cairo Santos 39-yard field goal, 0:17. Chiefs 6–3. **Drive: 4 plays, 3 yards, 0:49.**

**Third quarter**

- PHI – Alshon Jeffery 16-yard pass from Carson Wentz (Jake Elliott kick), 4:08. Eagles 10–6. **Drive: 7 plays, 81 yards, 4:20.**
- KC – Kareem Hunt 53-yard run (Cairo Santos kick), 1:20. Chiefs 13–10. **Drive: 5 plays, 83 yards, 2:48.**

**Fourth quarter**

- PHI – Jake Elliott 40-yard field goal, 11:57. Tied 13–13. **Drive: 10 plays, 49 yards, 4:23.**
- KC – Travis Kelce 15-yard pass from Alex Smith (Cairo Santos kick), 6:25. Chiefs 20–13. **Drive: 5 plays, 31 yards, 2:51.**
- KC – Kareem Hunt 2-yard run (Cairo Santos kick), 2:14. Chiefs 27–13. **Drive: 6 plays, 56 yards, 3:13.**
- PHI – Nelson Agholor 9-yard pass from Carson Wentz (Jake Elliott kick), 0:08. Chiefs 27–20. **Drive: 13 plays, 75 yards, 2:06.**

**Top passers**

- PHI – Carson Wentz – 25/46, 333 yards, 2 TD, INT
- KC – Alex Smith – 21/28, 251 yards, TD

**Top rushers**

- PHI – Carson Wentz – 4 rushes, 55 yards
- KC – Kareem Hunt – 13 rushes, 81 yards, 2 TD

**Top receivers**

- PHI – Zach Ertz – 5 receptions, 97 yards
- KC – Travis Kelce – 8 receptions, 103 yards, TD

In Week 2, Doug Pederson faced off for the first time against his mentor, Andy Reid, as the Eagles traveled to Arrowhead Stadium to take on the Kansas City Chiefs. In a surprisingly defensive dominated game, the Chiefs led 6–3 at halftime, following a missed field goal to close out the first half by Eagles rookie kicker Jake Elliott. The Eagles took a 10–6 lead in the third quarter, with Carson Wentz finding his new wide receiver, Alshon Jeffery for their first touchdown connection of the year. Chiefs rookie running back Kareem Hunt answered with a 53-yard touchdown run, and fourth quarter touchdowns by Chiefs tight end Travis Kelce and Hunt opened up the lead to 27–13 with just over 2 minutes remaining in the game. Wentz led the Eagles on a scoring drive, finding Nelson Agholor in the back of the end zone with 8 seconds left in the game. The Eagles recovered the ensuing onside kick, but a Hail Mary pass to end the game fell incomplete. Eagles running back LeGarrette Blount had 1 carry for zero yards in the game, and Pederson received heat postgame for not running the ball enough. The Eagles fell to 1–1 on the season.

==== Week 3: vs. New York Giants ====
Week Three: New York Giants at Philadelphia Eagles – Game summary

Quarter	1	2	3	4	Total
Giants	0	0	0	24	**24**
**Eagles**	0	7	7	13	**27**

at Lincoln Financial Field, Philadelphia, Pennsylvania

- Date: September 24
- Game time: 1:00 pm. EDT
- Game weather: 89 °F (32 °C), sunny
- Game attendance: 69,596
- Referee: Jerome Boger
- TV announcers (Fox): Joe Buck, Troy Aikman and Erin Andrews
- Recap, Gamebook

Game information

**First quarter**

- No scoring

**Second quarter**

- PHI – LeGarrette Blount 1-yard run (Jake Elliott kick), 9:29. Eagles 7–0. **Drive: 18 plays, 90 yards, 9:34.**

**Third quarter**

- PHI – Zach Ertz 3-yard pass from Carson Wentz (Jake Elliott kick), 5:15. Eagles 14–0. **Drive: 7 plays, 18 yards, 3:43.**

**Fourth quarter**

- NYG – Odell Beckham Jr. 10-yard pass from Eli Manning (Aldrick Rosas kick), 12:39. Eagles 14–7. **Drive: 5 plays, 55 yards, 2:10.**
- NYG – Odell Beckham Jr. 4-yard pass from Eli Manning (Aldrick Rosas kick), 10:53. Tied 14–14. **Drive: 4 plays, 33 yards, 1:20.**
- NYG – Sterling Shepard 77-yard pass from Eli Manning (Aldrick Rosas kick), 7:12. Giants 21–14. **Drive: 2 plays, 78 yards, 0:40.**
- PHI – Corey Clement 15-yard run (Jake Elliott kick), 5:40. Tied 21–21. **Drive: 4 plays, 39 yards, 1:32.**
- NYG – Aldrick Rosas 41-yard field goal, 3:08. Giants 24–21. **Drive: 7 plays, 39 yards, 2:32.**
- PHI – Jake Elliott 46-yard field goal, 0:51. Tied 24–24. **Drive: 8 plays, 62 yards, 2:17.**
- PHI – Jake Elliott 61-yard field goal, 0:00. Eagles 27–24. **Drive: 3 plays, 19 yards, 0:13.**

**Top passers**

- NYG – Eli Manning – 35/47, 366 yards, 3 TD, 2 INT
- PHI – Carson Wentz – 21/31, 176 yards, TD

**Top rushers**

- NYG – Orleans Darkwa – 7 rushes, 22 yards
- PHI – Wendell Smallwood – 12 rushes, 71 yards

**Top receivers**

- NYG – Sterling Shepard – 7 receptions, 133 yards, TD
- PHI – Alshon Jeffery – 4 receptions, 56 yards

Heading into this game, there were many questions on the run game especially on LeGarrette Blount as well as the offensive line who have struggled through the first two games. Plus, the Eagles were dealing with injuries on defense to safety Rodney McLeod, cornerback Ronald Darby and backup safety Corey Graham leaving Malcolm Jenkins and Chris Maragos the only healthy safeties.

Despite all of the setbacks, The Eagles hosted the 0–2 Giants who had only scored 13 points through the first two weeks of the season. Both teams started off in slow fashion, with no first quarter points. A LeGarrette Blount 1-yard touchdown run in the second quarter were the only points of the first half, after the Eagles stopped the Giants from reaching the end zone from 1 yard out to close out the first half. Coming out in the third quarter with a 7–0 lead, the Eagles added the only points of the third quarter with Carson Wentz finding tight end Zach Ertz for a 3-yard touchdown. The Eagles defense (who were playing a solid game) broke down in the fourth quarter allowing the Giants to score 21 unanswered points to start the fourth quarter, as quarterback Eli Manning found his all pro wide receiver Odell Beckham Jr. twice for touchdowns, and second year wide receiver Sterling Shepard once for a 77-yard touchdown. Fletcher Cox left the game with a calf injury. Eagles rookie running back Corey Clement ran for a 15-yard touchdown to tie the score at 21. After exchanging field goals, Wentz and the Eagles offense took over, looking to move into field goal range. Wentz connected with Alshon Jeffery for a 17-yard pass, setting up a Jake Elliott 61-yard field goal attempt with 1 second remaining. Elliott converted on the 61-yard attempt, the longest in Eagles franchise history as time expired. Wentz was quietly efficient in the game, completing 21 of 31 attempts for 176 yards and one touchdown despite playing behind a struggling offensive line. The win came at an expense, as running back Darren Sproles was ruled out for the remainder of the season with a broken arm and torn ACL, both of which occurred on the same play. Despite this injury, the Eagles ran the ball efficiently through most of the game.

With the close win, the Eagles advanced to 2–1 tying the Cowboys and the Redskins for first place in the NFC East while the Giants fell to 0–3 in the basement of the division.

==== Week 4: at Los Angeles Chargers ====
Week Four: Philadelphia Eagles at Los Angeles Chargers – Game summary

Quarter	1	2	3	4	Total
**Eagles**	10	6	3	7	**26**
Chargers	0	10	0	14	**24**

at StubHub Center, Carson, California

- Date: October 1
- Game time: 4:05 pm. EDT/1:05 p.m. PDT
- Game weather: 72 °F (22 °C), sunny
- Game attendance: 25,374
- Referee: Carl Cheffers
- TV announcers (Fox): Dick Stockton, Mark Schlereth and Shannon Spake
- Recap, Gamebook

Game information

**First quarter**

- PHI – Alshon Jeffery 8-yard pass from Carson Wentz (Jake Elliott kick), 8:00. Eagles 7–0. **Drive: 8 plays, 63 yards, 4:44.**
- PHI – Jake Elliott 45-yard field goal, 0:05. Eagles 10–0. **Drive: 11 plays, 60 yards, 5:35.**

**Second quarter**

- PHI – Jake Elliott 40-yard field goal, 6:42. Eagles 13–0. **Drive: 11 plays, 63 yards, 5:15.**
- LAC – Tyrell Williams 75-yard pass from Philip Rivers (Younghoe Koo kick), 6:32. Eagles 13–7. **Drive: 1 play, 75 yards, 0:10.**
- PHI – Jake Elliott 53-yard field goal, 4:08. Eagles 16–7. **Drive: 8 plays, 40 yards, 2:24.**
- LAC – Younghoe Koo 28-yard field goal, 0:00. Eagles 16–10. **Drive: 8 plays, 72 yards, 0:56.**

**Third quarter**

- PHI – Jake Elliott 47-yard field goal, 0:55. Eagles 19–10. **Drive: 13 plays, 70 yards, 6:51.**

**Fourth quarter**

- LAC – Austin Ekeler 35-yard run (Younghoe Koo kick), 13:42. Eagles 19–17. **Drive: 7 plays, 60 yards, 2:13.**
- PHI – Wendell Smallwood 3-yard run (Jake Elliott kick), 9:14. Eagles 26–17. **Drive: 7 plays, 71 yards, 4:28.**
- LAC – Hunter Henry 4-yard pass from Philip Rivers (Younghoe Koo kick), 6:44. Eagles 26–24. **Drive: 8 plays, 70 yards, 2:30.**

**Top passers**

- PHI – Carson Wentz – 17/31, 242 yards, TD
- LAC – Philip Rivers – 22/38, 347 yards, 2 TD

**Top rushers**

- PHI – LeGarrette Blount – 16 rushes, 136 yards
- LAC – Austin Ekeler – 1 rush, 35 yards, TD

**Top receivers**

- PHI – Zach Ertz – 5 receptions, 81 yards
- LAC – Keenan Allen – 5 receptions, 138 yards

The Eagles travelled to the west coast to take on the Los Angeles Chargers. Many Eagles fans invaded StubHub Center making it an unofficial home game for the Eagles (this would later be dubbed "Lincoln Financial Field West" by fans on Twitter). The Eagles jumped out to a 7–0 lead early, after Chris Long forced a fumble to set up an 8-yard touchdown pass from Carson Wentz to Alshon Jeffery. The Eagles would score on their first 5 drives of the game. Chargers quarterback Philip Rivers found Tyrell Williams for a 75-yard touchdown pass, trimming the lead to 13–7 midway through the 2nd quarter. The Eagles responded with a field goal to extend the lead. But Chargers kicker Younghoe Koo kicked a field goal the change the scoreboard to 16–10 before halftime. The Eagles were up 19–17 when running back Wendell Smallwood ran for a three-yard touchdown, increasing the lead to 26–17. A touchdown drive capped off by Philip Rivers finding second year tight end Hunter Henry with 6:44 left in the game made the score 26–24. Riding LeGarrette Blount and his 136 yards, which included a 68-yard run, the Eagles were able to grind out the remaining time on the clock and hold on for their second close win in a row. The Eagles were overall efficient on offense. The defense played well despite giving up big plays and allowing Philip Rivers to throw 347 yards.

With the win, the Eagles advanced to 3–1 maintaining a narrow one-game lead in the NFC East.

==== Week 5: vs. Arizona Cardinals ====
Week Five: Arizona Cardinals at Philadelphia Eagles – Game summary

Quarter	1	2	3	4	Total
Cardinals	0	7	0	0	**7**
**Eagles**	21	0	10	3	**34**

at Lincoln Financial Field, Philadelphia, Pennsylvania

- Date: October 8
- Game time: 1:00 pm. EDT
- Game weather: 77 °F (25 °C), showers
- Game attendance: 69,596
- Referee: John Hussey
- TV announcers (Fox): Chris Myers, Daryl Johnston and Laura Okmin
- Recap, Gamebook

Game information

**First quarter**

- PHI – Trey Burton 15-yard pass from Carson Wentz (Jake Elliott kick), 8:19. Eagles 7–0. **Drive: 10 plays, 49 yards, 5:26.**
- PHI – Zach Ertz 11-yard pass from Carson Wentz (Jake Elliott kick), 3:52. Eagles 14–0. **Drive: 3 plays, 15 yards, 1:30.**
- PHI – Torrey Smith 59-yard pass from Carson Wentz (Jake Elliott kick), 0:43. Eagles 21–0. **Drive: 3 plays, 64 yards, 1:33.**

**Second quarter**

- ARI – John Brown 13-yard pass from Carson Palmer (Phil Dawson kick), 11:42. Eagles 21–7. **Drive: 10 plays, 60 yards, 4:01.**

**Third quarter**

- PHI – Jake Elliott 36-yard field goal, 9:18. Eagles 24–7. **Drive: 11 plays, 57 yards, 5:42.**
- PHI – Nelson Agholor 72-yard pass from Carson Wentz (Jake Elliott kick), 6:16. Eagles 31–7. **Drive: 3 plays, 73 yards, 1:01.**

**Fourth quarter**

- PHI – Jake Elliott 28-yard field goal, 2:00. Eagles 34–7. **Drive: 13 plays, 47 yards, 9:14.**

**Top passers**

- ARI – Carson Palmer – 28/44, 291 yards, TD
- PHI – Carson Wentz – 21/30, 304 yards, 4 TD, INT

**Top rushers**

- ARI – Chris Johnson – 9 rushes, 21 yards
- PHI – LeGarrette Blount – 14 rushes, 74 yards

**Top receivers**

- ARI – J. J. Nelson – 4 receptions, 80 yards
- PHI – Nelson Agholor – 4 receptions, 93 yards, TD

The Eagles scored early and often in this game, for their first blowout win of the season against the Arizona Cardinals. Carson Wentz found tight ends Trey Burton and Zach Ertz for early touchdowns and later connected with wide receiver Torrey Smith for a 59-yard touchdown to finish the first quarter. Following Smith's touchdown, the Eagles unveiled their baseball home run celebration for the first time all season. The closest the Cardinals came was in the second quarter when they trailed 21–7 following a John Brown 13-yard touchdown. In the mid third quarter, on 3rd and 19, Wentz found wide receiver Nelson Agholor for a 72-yard touchdown pass, on which Agholor juked rookie safety Budda Baker and finished the play with the Nestea Plunge. The final score was 34–7, and Wentz threw for four touchdowns, including three first quarter touchdown passes.

==== Week 6: at Carolina Panthers ====
Week Six: Philadelphia Eagles at Carolina Panthers – Game summary

Quarter	1	2	3	4	Total
**Eagles**	3	7	11	7	**28**
Panthers	3	7	6	7	**23**

at Bank of America Stadium, Charlotte, North Carolina

- Date: October 12
- Game time: 8:25 pm. EDT
- Game weather: 72 °F (22 °C), cloudy
- Game attendance: 74,373
- Referee: Pete Morelli
- TV announcers (CBS/NFLN/Amazon Video): Jim Nantz, Tony Romo, Tracy Wolfson and Jay Feely
- Recap, Gamebook

Game information

**First quarter**

- PHI – Jake Elliott 50-yard field goal, 6:57. Eagles 3–0. **Drive: 11 plays, 63 yards, 5:18.**
- CAR – Graham Gano 39-yard field goal, 2:17. Tied 3–3. **Drive: 9 plays, 33 yards, 4:40.**

**Second quarter**

- CAR – Cam Newton 16-yard run (Graham Gano kick), 10:34. Panthers 10–3. **Drive: 4 plays, 43 yards, 1:59.**
- PHI – Zach Ertz 1-yard pass from Carson Wentz (Jake Elliott kick), 2:32. Tied 10–10. **Drive: 7 plays, 12 yards, 3:56.**

**Third quarter**

- PHI – Zach Ertz 17-yard pass from Carson Wentz (LeGarrette Blount 2-point run), 13:59. Eagles 18–10. **Drive: 2 plays, 17 yards, 0:08.**
- CAR – Graham Gano 20-yard field goal, 11:19. Eagles 18–13. **Drive: 8 plays, 23 yards, 2:40.**
- PHI – Jake Elliott 48-yard field goal, 8:02. Eagles 21–13. **Drive: 7 plays, 44 yards, 3:17.**
- CAR – Graham Gano 46-yard field goal, 3:23. Eagles 21–16. **Drive: 7 plays, 37 yards, 2:38.**

**Fourth quarter**

- PHI – Nelson Agholor 24-yard pass from Carson Wentz (Jake Elliott kick), 14:55. Eagles 28–16. **Drive: 6 plays, 75 yards, 3:28.**
- CAR – Christian McCaffrey 1-yard pass from Cam Newton (Graham Gano kick), 8:04. Eagles 28–23. **Drive: 13 plays, 75 yards, 6:51.**

**Top passers**

- PHI – Carson Wentz – 16/30, 222 yards, 3 TD
- CAR – Cam Newton – 28/52, 239 yards, TD, 3 INT

**Top rushers**

- PHI – LeGarrette Blount – 14 rushes, 67 yards
- CAR – Cam Newton – 11 rushes, 71 yards, TD

**Top receivers**

- PHI – Alshon Jeffery – 4 receptions, 71 yards
- CAR – Kelvin Benjamin – 9 receptions, 99 yards

Coming off a 34–7 drubbing of the Arizona Cardinals, the Eagles (4–1) traveled to take on the Carolina Panthers who were also 4–1. The Eagles drove into Panthers territory on their first possession of the game, but a Julius Peppers strip sack against Halapoulivaati Vaitai, who was filling in for a concussed Lane Johnson. The Panthers led 10–3, with their only touchdown coming from a 16-yard touchdown run from quarterback Cam Newton. Late in the second quarter, rookie cornerback Rasul Douglas intercepted Newton deep in Panthers territory, leading to a Zach Ertz 1-yard touchdown reception. The Eagles opened up the second half with another Zach Ertz touchdown, a 17-yard strike from Carson Wentz. Leading 21–16 after three-quarters, the Eagles opened up the fourth quarter with Carson Wentz hooking up with wide receiver Nelson Agholor for a 24-yard touchdown. Cam Newton led the Panthers on a long touchdown drive, trimming the score to 28–23. A late interception by cornerback Jalen Mills and a fourth down stop by the Eagles defense sealed the Eagles fifth victory of the season, and proved they were a legitimate contender in the NFC.

==== Week 7: vs. Washington Redskins ====
Week Seven: Washington Redskins at Philadelphia Eagles – Game summary

Quarter	1	2	3	4	Total
Redskins	3	7	7	7	**24**
**Eagles**	0	17	7	10	**34**

at Lincoln Financial Field, Philadelphia, Pennsylvania

- Date: October 23
- Game time: 8:30 pm. EDT
- Game weather: 70 °F (21 °C), cloudy
- Game attendance: 69,596
- Referee: Ed Hochuli
- TV announcers (ESPN): Sean McDonough, Jon Gruden and Lisa Salters
- Recap, Gamebook

Game information

**First quarter**

- WAS – Nick Rose 27-yard field goal, 11:18. Redskins 3–0. **Drive: 8 plays, 66 yards, 3:42.**

**Second quarter**

- PHI – Jake Elliott 50-yard field goal, 13:15. Tied 3–3. **Drive: 9 plays, 33 yards, 4:04.**
- WAS – Chris Thompson 7-yard pass from Kirk Cousins (Nick Rose kick), 9:14. Redskins 10–3. **Drive: 7 plays, 76 yards, 4:01.**
- PHI – Mack Hollins 64-yard pass from Carson Wentz (Jake Elliott kick), 3:19. Tied 10–10. **Drive: 7 plays, 80 yards, 3:01.**
- PHI – Zach Ertz 4-yard pass from Carson Wentz (Jake Elliott kick), 0:22. Eagles 17–10. **Drive: 6 plays, 70 yards, 1:30.**

**Third quarter**

- PHI – Corey Clement 9-yard pass from Carson Wentz (Jake Elliott kick), 9:43. Eagles 24–10. **Drive: 10 plays, 86 yards, 5:17.**
- WAS – Jordan Reed 5-yard pass from Kirk Cousins (Nick Rose kick), 0:44. Eagles 24–17. **Drive: 8 plays, 52 yards, 4:04.**

**Fourth quarter**

- PHI – Nelson Agholor 10-yard pass from Carson Wentz (Jake Elliott kick), 11:10. Eagles 31–17. **Drive: 9 plays, 75 yards, 4:34.**
- PHI – Jake Elliott 42-yard field goal, 6:19. Eagles 34–17. **Drive: 4 plays, 2 yards, 2:20.**
- WAS – Jordan Reed 12-yard pass from Kirk Cousins (Nick Rose kick), 3:16. Eagles 34–24. **Drive: 9 plays, 66 yards, 3:02.**

**Top passers**

- WAS – Kirk Cousins – 30/40, 303 yards, 3 TD, INT
- PHI – Carson Wentz – 17/25, 268 yards, 4 TD, INT

**Top rushers**

- WAS – Chris Thompson – 7 rushes, 38 yards
- PHI – Carson Wentz – 8 rushes, 63 yards

**Top receivers**

- WAS – Vernon Davis – 4 receptions, 67 yards
- PHI – Zach Ertz – 5 receptions, 89 yards, TD

Following the 28–23 victory on Thursday Night Football against the Panthers, the Eagles returned home for the next 3 games and were once again in a prime time matchup; this time, a Monday Night matchup against the Washington Redskins. The Eagles started off the game in sluggish fashion, and after being backed up over 20 yards due to penalties on their first drive of the game, Carson Wentz threw his fourth interception of the season. After exchanging field goals, Redskins running back Chris Thompson caught a 7-yard touchdown pass from quarterback Kirk Cousins. Wentz and the Eagles responded with an offensive outburst to end the first half. Wentz found rookie wide receiver Mack Hollins for a 64-yard touchdown and later found tight end Zach Ertz for a four-yard strike to end the first half. The Eagles increased their lead to 24–10 early in the third quarter, with Wentz finding rookie running back Corey Clement on a beautiful throw in the corner of the end zone. The Redskins responded at the end of the third, with Kirk Cousins finding tight end Jordan Reed for a five-yard touchdown. Once again, Wentz led the Eagles down the field, along the way dramatically evading a 3rd-and-8 sack behind the Eagles' 27 and turning it into a 17-yard run, capping off the drive with a 10-yard touchdown to Nelson Agholor. A Jake Elliott field goal later in the quarter opened the lead to 34–17, and the Eagles went on to win 34–24. Wentz once again was in MVP form, completing 17/25 attempts for 268 yards and four touchdowns. However, the win came at a cost, as future Hall of Fame left tackle Jason Peters was lost for the season with a torn ACL, and starting middle linebacker Jordan Hicks was also lost for the season with a ruptured achilles.

With the win, the Eagles improved to 6–1 and swept the Redskins for the first time since 2013.

==== Week 8: vs. San Francisco 49ers ====
Week Eight: San Francisco 49ers at Philadelphia Eagles – Game summary

Quarter	1	2	3	4	Total
49ers	0	0	7	3	**10**
**Eagles**	3	14	10	6	**33**

at Lincoln Financial Field, Philadelphia, Pennsylvania

- Date: October 29
- Game time: 1:00 pm. EDT
- Game weather: 67 °F (19 °C), rain
- Game attendance: 69,596
- Referee: Clete Blakeman
- TV announcers (Fox): Kenny Albert, Charles Davis and Pam Oliver
- Recap, Gamebook

Game information

**First quarter**

- PHI – Jake Elliott 40-yard field goal, 2:35. Eagles 3–0. **Drive: 11 plays, 47 yards, 5:50.**

**Second quarter**

- PHI – Zach Ertz 1-yard pass from Carson Wentz (kick failed), 1:51. Eagles 9–0. **Drive: 6 plays, 32 yards, 2:51.**
- PHI – Jalen Mills 37-yard interception return (Alshon Jeffery 2-point pass from Carson Wentz), 1:24. Eagles 17–0. **Drive: 0 plays, 37 yards, 0:00.**

**Third quarter**

- PHI – Jake Elliott 51-yard field goal, 8:01. Eagles 20–0. **Drive: 6 plays, 19 yards, 1:25.**
- SF – Matt Breida 21-yard pass from C. J. Beathard (Robbie Gould kick), 4:29. Eagles 20–7. **Drive: 2 plays, 21 yards, 0:14.**
- PHI – Alshon Jeffery 53-yard pass from Carson Wentz (Jake Elliott kick), 3:37. Eagles 27–7. **Drive: 3 plays, 75 yards, 0:52.**

**Fourth quarter**

- PHI – LeGarrette Blount 12-yard run (Jake Elliott kick failed), 10:22. Eagles 33–7. **Drive: 8 plays, 47 yards, 3:38.**
- SF – Robbie Gould 50-yard field goal, 5:20. Eagles 33–10. **Drive: 11 plays, 33 yards, 5:02.**

**Top passers**

- SF – C. J. Beathard – 17/36, 167 yards, TD, 2 INT
- PHI – Carson Wentz – 18/32, 211 yards, 2 TD, INT

**Top rushers**

- SF – C. J. Beathard – 6 rushes, 40 yards
- PHI – Corey Clement – 10 rushes, 54 yards

**Top receivers**

- SF – Matt Breida – 4 receptions, 39 yards, TD
- PHI – Alshon Jeffery – 2 receptions, 62 yards, TD

The Eagles looked to win their 6th game in a row against the winless San Francisco 49ers. The Eagles got off to a slow start, only leading 3–0 after the first quarter. Late in the second quarter, the Eagles blew the game open. Carson Wentz found tight end Zach Ertz for a 1-yard touchdown in the back of the end zone off of a bootleg pass, and Jalen Mills intercepted rookie quarterback C.J. Beathard and returned it 37 yards for a touchdown. The 49ers appeared to have some life in the third quarter, following a Carson Wentz interception, leading to a Matt Breida 22-yard touchdown reception. However, the Eagles responded, with Wentz connecting with Alshon Jeffery for a 53-yard touchdown, putting the game out of reach. The Eagles went on to win 33–10 and advanced to 7–1 on the season. Despite the win, the Eagles played a sloppy game in a rainy afternoon in Philadelphia.

==== Week 9: vs. Denver Broncos ====
Week Nine: Denver Broncos at Philadelphia Eagles – Game summary

Quarter	1	2	3	4	Total
Broncos	3	6	0	14	**23**
**Eagles**	17	14	13	7	**51**

at Lincoln Financial Field, Philadelphia, Pennsylvania

- Date: November 5
- Game time: 1:00 pm. EST
- Game weather: 61 °F (16 °C), cloudy
- Game attendance: 69,596
- Referee: Gene Steratore
- TV announcers (CBS): Ian Eagle, Dan Fouts and Evan Washburn
- Recap, Gamebook

Game information

**First quarter**

- DEN – Brandon McManus 52-yard field goal, 10:35. Broncos 3–0. **Drive: 9 plays, 47 yards, 4:25.**
- PHI – Alshon Jeffery 32-yard pass from Carson Wentz (Jake Elliott kick), 6:34. Eagles 7–3. **Drive: 7 plays, 65 yards, 4:01.**
- PHI – Jake Elliott 45-yard field goal, 1:53. Eagles 10–3. **Drive: 6 plays, 29 yards, 2:14.**
- PHI – Corey Clement 15-yard pass from Carson Wentz (Jake Elliott kick), 0:53. Eagles 17–3. **Drive: 3 plays, 15 yards, 0:51.**

**Second quarter**

- DEN – Brandon McManus 53-yard field goal, 11:05. Eagles 17–6. **Drive: 4 plays, 8 yards, 1:00.**
- PHI – Trey Burton 27-yard pass from Carson Wentz (Jake Elliott kick), 9:15. Eagles 24–6. **Drive: 6 plays, 55 yards, 1:50.**
- DEN – Brandon McManus 24-yard field goal, 3:03. Eagles 24–9. **Drive: 12 plays, 69 yards, 6:12.**
- PHI – Jay Ajayi 46-yard run (Jake Elliott kick), 1:20. Eagles 31–9. **4 plays, 70 yards, 1:43.**

**Third quarter**

- PHI – Corey Clement 2-yard run (Jake Elliott kick), 7:32. Eagles 38–9. **13 plays, 87 yards, 7:28.**
- PHI – Alshon Jeffery 4-yard pass from Carson Wentz (Jake Elliott kick failed), 3:00. Eagles 44–9. **3 plays, 11 yards, 1:25.**

**Fourth quarter**

- DEN – Demaryius Thomas 1-yard pass from Brock Osweiler (Brandon McManus kick), 9:45. Eagles 44–16. **Drive: 13 plays, 75 yards, 8:15.**
- DEN – Brandon Marshall 19-yard fumble return (Brandon McManus kick), 8:09. Eagles 44–23. **Drive: 0 plays, 19 yards, 0:00.**
- PHI – Corey Clement 4-yard run (Jake Elliott kick), 4:44. Eagles 51–23. **Drive: 5 plays, 43 yards, 3:25.**

**Top passers**

- DEN – Brock Osweiler – 19/38, 208 yards, TD, 2 INT
- PHI – Carson Wentz – 15/27, 199 yards, 4 TD

**Top rushers**

- DEN – Devontae Booker – 6 rushes, 21 yards
- PHI – Jay Ajayi – 8 rushes, 77 yards, TD

**Top receivers**

- DEN – Demaryius Thomas – 8 receptions, 70 yards, TD
- PHI – Alshon Jeffery – 6 receptions, 84 yards, 2 TD

Heading into the game, there was a lot of hype surrounding new Eagles running back Jay Ajayi who was traded prior to the NFL trade deadline. The Eagles looked to improve to 8–1 for the first time since 2004 as they took on the Denver Broncos. The Denver Broncos named Brock Osweiler as their starting quarterback, replacing Trevor Siemian. The Broncos took their only lead of the game on an opening drive that resulted with a Brandon McManus 53-yard field goal. Despite missing tight end Zach Ertz who was out with a hamstring injury, the Eagles offense didn't miss a beat. On their opening drive of the game, Carson Wentz faked a handoff to newly acquired running back Jay Ajayi and found Alshon Jeffery wide open for a 32-yard touchdown down the right sideline. Later in the first quarter, slot cornerback Patrick Robinson picked off Brock Osweiler on an intended pass to Demaryius Thomas, setting up a Corey Clement 15-yard touchdown reception, on a screen pass. The Eagles responded to another Brandon McManus field goal with a 27-yard touchdown connection between Wentz and tight end Trey Burton. Following McManus' third field goal of the first half, Jay Ajayi found the end zone for the first time with the Eagles, with a 46-yard touchdown run to close the first half. The Eagles led 31–9 at halftime and following a third quarter touchdown run by Corey Clement and touchdown reception by Alshon Jeffery, the Eagles led 44–9. The final score was 51–23, which was virtually a mirror of their last meeting in 2013, and Corey Clement finished the day with three touchdowns (two rushing, one receiving). With the win, the Eagles went into the bye week with the best start since 2004. They had also surpassed their win total from last season where they only got 7 wins. Furthermore, this was the third largest victory at Lincoln Financial Field since the 54–11 win over the Bears in 2013 and the largest victory in the Doug Pederson era.

==== Week 11: at Dallas Cowboys ====
Week Eleven: Philadelphia Eagles at Dallas Cowboys – Game summary

Quarter	1	2	3	4	Total
**Eagles**	7	0	16	14	**37**
Cowboys	6	3	0	0	**9**

at AT&T Stadium, Arlington, Texas

- Date: November 19
- Game time: 8:30 pm. EST/7:30 pm. CST
- Game weather: 54 °F (12 °C), clear skies – retractable roof open
- Game attendance: 93,247
- Referee: Bill Vinovich
- TV announcers (NBC): Al Michaels, Cris Collinsworth and Michele Tafoya
- Recap, Gamebook

Game information

**First quarter**

- DAL – Mike Nugent 48-yard field goal, 13:27. Cowboys 3–0. **Drive: 4 plays, 7 yards, 1:38.**
- PHI – Kenjon Barner 4-yard run (Jake Elliott kick), 9:16. Eagles 7–3. **Drive: 8 plays, 75 yards, 4:19.**
- DAL – Mike Nugent 27-yard field goal, 3:20. Eagles 7–6. **Drive: 11 plays, 65 yards, 5:47.**

**Second quarter**

- DAL – Mike Nugent 47-yard field goal, 1:00. Cowboys 9–7. **Drive: 15 plays, 59 yards, 7:19.**

**Third quarter**

- PHI – Corey Clement 11-yard run (Corey Clement run), 10:56. Eagles 15–9. **Drive: 8 plays, 75 yards, 4:04.**
- PHI – Torrey Smith 11-yard pass from Carson Wentz (Alshon Jeffery 2-point pass from Carson Wentz), 5:40. Eagles 23–9. **Drive: 5 plays, 90 yards, 2:28.**

**Fourth quarter**

- PHI – Alshon Jeffery 17-yard pass from Carson Wentz (pass failed), 12:10. Eagles 29–9. **Drive: 11 plays, 85 yards, 5:48.**
- PHI – Nigel Bradham 37-yard fumble return (Trey Burton 2-point pass from Carson Wentz), 10:43. Eagles 37–9. **Drive: 3 plays, −3 yards, 1:19.**

**Top passers**

- PHI – Carson Wentz – 14/27, 168 yards, 2 TD
- DAL – Dak Prescott – 18/31, 145 yards, 3 INT

**Top rushers**

- PHI – Jay Ajayi – 7 carries, 91 yards
- DAL – Alfred Morris – 17 carries, 91 yards

**Top receivers**

- PHI – Alshon Jeffery – 3 receptions, 50 yards, TD
- DAL – Dez Bryant – 8 receptions, 63 yards

The Eagles travelled to Dallas to take on the Dallas Cowboys, who were missing running back Ezekiel Elliott (suspension), left tackle Tyron Smith (groin), and linebacker Sean Lee (hamstring). In a game that the Eagles were expected to dominate, the Eagles started off slow in the first half with Dallas leading 9–7 at halftime. Kicker Jake Elliott was ruled out for the game with a concussion, forcing the Eagles to use backup linebacker Kamu Grugier-Hill for kickoffs, and to go for two-point conversions. The Eagles converted three of four two-point conversions, as their touchdowns came on the ground from both Kenjon Barner and Corey Clement, and through the air, with Carson Wentz finding Torrey Smith for an 11-yard touchdown and Alshon Jeffery for a 17-yard touchdown on fourth down. Late in the fourth quarter, rookie defensive end Derek Barnett notched his second sack of the game, a strip sack of Dak Prescott, leading to a Nigel Bradham 37-yard scoop and score. The Eagles harassed Dak Prescott all game, sacking him four times, intercepting him three times, and forcing one fumble. With this win, the Eagles improved to 9–1 and improved their lead in the NFC East.

==== Week 12: vs. Chicago Bears ====
Week Twelve: Chicago Bears at Philadelphia Eagles – Game summary

Quarter	1	2	3	4	Total
Bears	0	0	3	0	**3**
**Eagles**	7	17	0	7	**31**

at Lincoln Financial Field, Philadelphia, Pennsylvania

- Date: November 26
- Game time: 1:00 pm. EST
- Game weather: 49 °F (9 °C), sunny
- Game attendance: 69,596
- Referee: Walt Coleman
- TV announcers (Fox): Kevin Burkhardt, Charles Davis and Pam Oliver
- Recap, Gamebook

Game information

**First quarter**

- PHI – Zach Ertz 17-yard pass from Carson Wentz (Jake Elliott kick), 6:04. Eagles 7–0. **Drive: 8 plays, 44 yards, 3:36.**

**Second quarter**

- PHI – Nelson Agholor 15-yard pass from Carson Wentz (Jake Elliott kick), 10:52. Eagles 14–0. **Drive: 9 plays, 56 yards, 5:27.**
- PHI – Jake Elliott 45-yard field goal, 6:52. Eagles 17–0. **Drive: 5 plays, 18 yards, 2:29.**
- PHI – Alshon Jeffery 8-yard pass from Carson Wentz (Jake Elliott kick), 0:05. Eagles 24–0. **Drive: 13 plays, 69 yards, 4:33.**

**Third quarter**

- CHI – Cairo Santos 38-yard field goal, 8:40. Eagles 24–3. **Drive: 10 plays, 36 yards, 6:20.**

**Fourth quarter**

- PHI – Nelson Agholor 0-yard fumble return (Jake Elliott kick), 13:37. Eagles 31–3. **Drive: 6 plays, 73 yards, 2:25.**

**Top passers**

- CHI – Mitchell Trubisky: 17/33, 147 yards, 2 INT
- PHI – Carson Wentz: 23/36, 227 yards, 3 TD

**Top rushers**

- CHI – Mitchell Trubisky: 4 rushes, 12 yards
- PHI – LeGarrette Blount: 15 rushes, 97 yards

**Top receivers**

- CHI – Dontrelle Inman: 4 receptions, 64 yards
- PHI – Zach Ertz: 10 receptions, 103 yards, TD

With the Eagles heading into this game at 9–1, they looked to take down the 3–7 Bears. The Eagles blew out the Bears with a final score of 31–3 and improved to 10–1 on the season. The Eagles held the Bears to no first downs in the first half and led 24–0 at halftime. Zach Ertz became the first Eagles receiver of 2017 to record at least 100 receiving yards in a game, catching 10 passes for 103 yards and a touchdown. Alshon Jeffery had 5 receptions for 52 yards and a touchdown. Nelson Agholor added 3 receptions for 32 yards, including a 15-yard touchdown, and recovered a Jay Ajayi fumble for a touchdown late in the game. Carson Wentz continued his MVP campaign, completing 23 of 36 passes, for 227 yards, and 3 touchdowns. The Eagles defense stymied Mitchell Trubisky and the Bears offense, holding running back Jordan Howard to 6 yards on 7 rushes. Malcolm Jenkins and Corey Graham each added one interception.

==== Week 13: at Seattle Seahawks ====
Week Thirteen: Philadelphia Eagles at Seattle Seahawks – Game summary

Quarter	1	2	3	4	Total
Eagles	0	3	0	7	**10**
**Seahawks**	10	0	7	7	**24**

at CenturyLink Field, Seattle, Washington

- Date: December 3
- Game time: 8:30 pm. EST/5:30 pm. PST
- Game weather: 44 °F (7 °C), cloudy
- Game attendance: 69,075
- Referee: Tony Corrente
- TV announcers (NBC): Al Michaels, Cris Collinsworth and Michele Tafoya
- Recap, Gamebook

Game information

**First quarter**

- SEA – Blair Walsh 46-yard field goal, 9:47. Seahawks 3–0. **Drive: 12 plays, 53 yards, 5:13.**
- SEA – Jimmy Graham 11-yard pass from Russell Wilson (Blair Walsh kick), 0:10. Seahawks 10–0. **Drive: 5 plays, 85 yards, 2:48.**

**Second quarter**

- PHI – Jake Elliott 26-yard field goal, 7:51. Seahawks 10–3. **Drive: 16 plays, 75 yards, 7:19.**

**Third quarter**

- SEA – Tyler Lockett 1-yard pass from Russell Wilson (Blair Walsh kick), 5:42. Seahawks 17–3. **Drive: 11 plays, 80 yards, 3:57.**

**Fourth quarter**

- PHI – Nelson Agholor 27-yard pass from Carson Wentz (Jake Elliott kick), 12:08. Seahawks 17–10. **Drive: 7 plays, 81 yards, 3:48.**
- SEA – J. D. McKissic 15-yard pass from Russell Wilson (Blair Walsh kick), 7:29. Seahawks 24–10. **Drive: 10 plays, 73 yards, 4:39.**

**Top passers**

- PHI – Carson Wentz – 29/45, 348 yards, TD, INT
- SEA – Russell Wilson – 20/31, 227 yards, 3 TD

**Top rushers**

- PHI – Jay Ajayi – 9 rushes, 35 yards
- SEA – Mike Davis – 16 rushes, 64 yards

**Top receivers**

- PHI – Nelson Agholor – 7 receptions, 141 yards, TD
- SEA – Doug Baldwin – 5 receptions, 84 yards

**Top tacklers**

- PHI – Mychal Kendricks – 5 solo tackles, 4 assisted
- SEA – Bobby Wagner – 9 solo tackles, 4 assisted

The Eagles struggled throughout this game with penalties and scoring blows that led them losing 24–10 in Seattle. With the loss, the Eagles snapped their 9–game winning streak, lost to Seattle for the fourth time since 2008 and fell to 10–2. The loss dropped them to a tie with the Minnesota Vikings for top seed in the NFC.

==== Week 14: at Los Angeles Rams ====
Week Fourteen: Philadelphia Eagles at Los Angeles Rams – Game summary

Quarter	1	2	3	4	Total
**Eagles**	14	10	7	12	**43**
Rams	7	7	14	7	**35**

at Los Angeles Memorial Coliseum, Los Angeles, California

- Date: December 10
- Game time: 4:25 pm. EST/1:25 pm. PST
- Game weather: 83 °F (28 °C), cloudy
- Game attendance: 67,752
- Referee: Craig Wrolstad
- TV announcers (Fox): Joe Buck, Troy Aikman and Erin Andrews
- Recap, Gamebook

Game information

**First quarter**

- LA – Todd Gurley 2-yard rush (Greg Zuerlein kick), 13:00. Rams 7–0. **Drive: 3 plays, 37 yards, 0:56.**
- PHI – Brent Celek 5-yard pass from Carson Wentz (Jake Elliott kick), 8:44. Tie 7–7. **Drive: 8 plays, 66 yards, 4:16.**
- PHI – Trey Burton 20-yard pass from Carson Wentz (Jake Elliott kick), 2:54. Eagles 14–7. **Drive: 7 plays, 52 yards, 3:43.**

**Second quarter**

- PHI – Trey Burton 11-yard pass from Carson Wentz (Jake Elliott kick), 11:10. Eagles 21–7. **Drive: 11 plays, 80 yards, 4:32.**
- LA – Cooper Kupp 6-yard pass from Jared Goff (Greg Zuerlein kick), 9:24. Eagles 21–14. **Drive: 6 plays, 70 yards, 1:46.**
- PHI – Jake Elliott 22-yard field goal, 0:09. Eagles 24–14. **Drive: 10 plays, 80 yards, 1:40.**

**Third quarter**

- LA – Sammy Watkins 1-yard pass from Jared Goff (Greg Zuerlein kick), 11:41. Eagles 24–21. **Drive: 6 plays, 71 yards, 3:19.**
- LA – Blake Countess 16-yard blocked punt return (Greg Zuerlein kick), 10:07. Rams 28–24. **Drive: 0 plays, 16 yards, 0:00.**
- PHI – Alshon Jeffery 2-yard pass from Carson Wentz (Jake Elliott kick), 2:20. Eagles 31–28. **Drive: 15 plays, 77 yards, 7:47.**

**Fourth quarter**

- LA – Todd Gurley 1-yard rush (Greg Zuerlein kick), 13:58. Rams 35–31. **Drive: 7 plays, 70 yards, 3:22.**
- PHI – Jake Elliott 41-yard field goal, 9:54. Rams 35–34. **Drive: 10 plays, 47 yards, 4:04.**
- PHI – Jake Elliott 33-yard field goal, 3:45. Eagles 37–35. **Drive: 7 plays, 5 yards, 4:28.**
- PHI – Brandon Graham 16-yard fumble return (Nick Foles kneel; run failed), 0:00. Eagles 43–35. **Drive: 0 plays, 16 yards, 0:00.**

**Top passers**

- PHI – Carson Wentz: 23/41, 291 yards, 4 TD, INT
- LA – Jared Goff: 16/26, 199 yards, 2 TD

**Top rushers**

- PHI – Jay Ajayi: 15 rushes, 78 yards
- LA – Todd Gurley: 13 rushes, 96 yards, 2 TD

**Top receivers**

- PHI – Torrey Smith: 6 receptions, 100 yards
- LA – Cooper Kupp: 5 receptions, 118 yards, TD

**Top tacklers**

- PHI – Nigel Bradham, Ronald Darby: 6 tackles
- LA – John Johnson: 7 tackles, 4 assists

The 10–2 Eagles bounced back from the previous week's heartbreaking 24–10 loss to Seattle, and for the first time since 2013, the Eagles clinched the NFC East title. However, Carson Wentz suffered an apparent knee injury while trying to dive for a touchdown late in the third quarter. throwing a touchdown pass to Alshon Jeffery before being ruled out for the game's remainder. The Eagles were already without Darren Sproles, Jason Peters and Jordan Hicks for the rest of the year. Nick Foles would come in and replace Wentz. This was also the first matchup of the Jared Goff-Carson Wentz rivalry. Trailing by two in the final seconds, the Rams attempted a last second comeback through lateral passes, but to no avail as a pass was fumbled with no time left on the clock and returned by Brandon Graham for one more touchdown to add six to their lead.

With the win, the Eagles advanced to 11–2 and clinched the NFC East. They also got back the #1 seed thanks to a Vikings loss to the Panthers earlier in the day.

The day after the game, Wentz was revealed to have torn his ACL, officially ending his season and making Nick Foles the starting quarterback for the rest of the season.

==== Week 15: at New York Giants ====
Week Fifteen: Philadelphia Eagles at New York Giants – Game summary

Quarter	1	2	3	4	Total
**Eagles**	7	14	10	3	**34**
Giants	13	10	6	0	**29**

at MetLife Stadium, East Rutherford, New Jersey

- Date: December 17
- Game time: 1:00 pm. EST
- Game weather: 35 °F (2 °C), cloudy
- Game attendance: 76,896
- Referee: Brad Allen
- TV announcers (Fox): Thom Brennaman, Chris Spielman and Peter Schrager
- Recap, Gamebook

Game information

**First quarter**

- NYG – Orleans Darkwa 1-yard rush (Aldrick Rosas kick blocked), 9:04. Giants 6–0. **Drive: 13 plays, 76 yards, 5:56.**
- PHI – Alshon Jeffery 3-yard pass from Nick Foles (Jake Elliott kick), 5:28. Eagles 7–6. **Drive: 7 plays, 38 yards, 3:36.**
- NYG – Tavarres King 13-yard pass from Eli Manning (Aldrick Rosas kick), 1:26. Giants 13–7. **Drive: 10 plays, 75 yards, 4:02.**

**Second quarter**

- NYG – Sterling Shepard 67-yard pass from Eli Manning (Aldrick Rosas kick), 13:44. Giants 20–7. **Drive: 3 plays, 75 yards, 1:03.**
- PHI – Zach Ertz 10-yard pass from Nick Foles (Jake Elliott kick), 4:49. Giants 20–14. **Drive: 5 plays, 20 yards, 1:24.**
- PHI – Trey Burton 13-yard pass from Nick Foles (Jake Elliott kick), 2:20. Eagles 21–20. **Drive: 3 plays, 18 yards, 0:56.**
- NYG – Aldrick Rosas 28-yard field goal, 0:27. Giants 23–21. **Drive: 11 plays, 50 yards, 1:53.**

**Third quarter**

- PHI – Jake Elliott 28-yard field goal, 9:18. Eagles 24–23. **Drive: 11 plays, 64 yards, 5:42.**
- PHI – Nelson Agholor 10-yard pass from Nick Foles (Jake Elliott kick), 5:47. Eagles 31–23. **Drive: 5 plays, 64 yards, 2:51.**
- NYG – Tavarres King 57-yard pass from Eli Manning (Eli Manning 2-point pass failed), 1:57. Eagles 31–29. **Drive: 8 plays, 75 yards, 3:50.**

**Fourth quarter**

- PHI – Jake Elliott 20-yard field goal, 3:56. Eagles 34–29. **Drive: 14 plays, 60 yards, 7:30.**

**Top passers**

- PHI – Nick Foles: 24/38, 237 yards, 4 TD
- NYG – Eli Manning: 37/57, 434 yards, 3 TD, INT

**Top rushers**

- PHI – Jay Ajayi: 12 rushes, 49 yards
- NYG – Wayne Gallman: 8 rushes, 39 yards

**Top receivers**

- PHI – Nelson Agholor: 7 receptions, 59 yards, TD
- NYG – Sterling Shepard: 11 receptions, 139 yards, TD

**Top tacklers**

- PHI – Nigel Bradham: 8 tackles, 3 assists, Rodney McLeod: 7 tackles, 4 assists
- NYG – Eli Apple: 7 tackles, 2 assists, Darian Thompson: 6 tackles, 3 assists

The Philadelphia Eagles headed into Week 15 of the 2017 NFL season at 11–2. With them clinching the NFC East in Week 14 in a win against the Rams, the Eagles were now fighting for the 1st seed in the NFC playoffs, home-field advantage, and a first-round bye. This was the first week that the Eagles played without MVP candidate Carson Wentz after he went down with a torn ACL in Week 14, ending his season. Backup quarterback, Nick Foles led the Eagles offense for his first time since 2014. The Eagles quickly fell behind 6–0 in the first few minutes of the 1st as Eli Manning and the New York Giants marched down the field and scored on their opening possession. The Eagles responded with a 3-yard pass from Nick Foles to Alshon Jeffery and went up 7–6. Towards the end of the first quarter, the Giants scored again with a 13-yard touchdown pass to Tavarres King to put them up 13–7. In the beginning of the second quarter, the Giants continued to show dominance as Eli Manning threw a 67-yard touchdown pass to put the Giants up 20–7. Nick Foles and the offense would eventually close the gap to bring the Eagles within two points at halftime with the Giants leading 23–21. The Eagles would eventually take the lead with a 28-yard field goal from Jake Elliott to put them up 24–23. In the middle of the fourth, Nelson Agholor caught a 10-yard pass from Nick Foles which gave the Eagles a 31–23 lead. The Giants responded with a score of their own, a 57-yard touchdown pass to Tavarres King which cut the Eagles lead to 31–29 after a failed attempt at a tying 2-point conversion. In the fourth, Jake Elliott hit a 20-yard field goal to put the Eagles up 34–29. The Eagles won the game after defensive stop in their own territory.

With this win, the Eagles improved to a league-best 12–2 and clinched a first-round bye for the first time since 2004.

Despite the win, the defense was dismal against a woeful Giants team that has been decimated with injuries since the two teams met in Week 3.

==== Week 16: vs. Oakland Raiders ====
NFL Christmas Games

Week Sixteen: Oakland Raiders at Philadelphia Eagles – Game summary

Quarter	1	2	3	4	Total
Raiders	0	7	3	0	**10**
**Eagles**	7	0	3	9	**19**

at Lincoln Financial Field, Philadelphia, Pennsylvania

- Date: December 25
- Game time: 8:30 pm. EST
- Game weather: 29 °F (−2 °C), partly cloudy
- Game attendance: 69,596
- Referee: Ronald Torbert
- TV announcers (ESPN): Sean McDonough, Jon Gruden and Lisa Salters
- Recap, Gamebook

Game information

**First quarter**

- PHI – Jay Ajayi 17-yard pass from Nick Foles (Jake Elliott kick), 2:51. Eagles 7–0. **Drive: 11 plays, 58 yards, 6:16.**

**Second quarter**

- OAK – Amari Cooper 63-yard pass from Derek Carr (Giorgio Tavecchio kick), 12:36. Tie 7–7. **Drive: 3 plays, 74 yards, 1:24.**

**Third quarter**

- OAK – Giorgio Tavecchio 25-yard field goal, 10:50. Raiders 10–7. **Drive: 8 plays, 69 yards, 4:10.**
- PHI – Jake Elliott 35-yard field goal, 2:13. Tie 10–10. **Drive: 5 plays, 13 yards, 1:33.**

**Fourth quarter**

- PHI – Jake Elliott 48-yard field goal, 0:22. Eagles 13–10. **Drive: 6 plays, 21 yards, 0:32.**
- PHI – Derek Barnett 23-yard fumble return (Nick Foles kneel; run failed). Eagles 19–10. **Drive: 0 plays, 23 yards, 0:00.**

**Top passers**

- OAK – Derek Carr: 15/29, 140 yards, TD, 2 INT
- PHI – Nick Foles: 19/38, 163 yards, TD, INT

**Top rushers**

- OAK – Marshawn Lynch: 25 rushes, 95 yards
- PHI – Jay Ajayi: 14 rushes, 52 yards

**Top receivers**

- OAK – Amari Cooper: 3 receptions, 66 yards, TD
- PHI – Zach Ertz: 9 receptions, 81 yards

**Top tacklers**

- OAK – NaVorro Bowman: 6 tackles, 1 assist
- PHI – Nigel Bradham: 6 tackles, 2 assists

This game would prove to be the opposite of the previous game as the defense and special teams carried a struggling offense to a 19–10 win over the Oakland Raiders. The Eagles start off solid with a Nick Foles touchdown pass to Jay Ajayi to put them up 7–0, but coming in the second quarter, Derek Carr threw a 36-yard pass to Amari Cooper to tie the game. Jake Elliott missed a 33-yard field goal thus leaving the score 7–7 halftime. In the third quarter, the Raiders would take a 10–7 lead with a Giorgio Tavecchio kick, but the Eagles responded later with a Jake Elliott field goal to tie the game up at 10 after a turnover and pick battle. Defensive efforts and poor offense by both teams caused them to trade punts going into the fourth quarter. Tavecchio missed a 48-yard attempt and Derek Carr would be intercepted a second time, which led to Jake Elliott nailing a 48-yarder of his own to put the Eagles up 13–10. With only 3 seconds left, the Raiders attempted to lateral the ball, but ended up fumbling it, and Derek Barnett ran it back to the end zone as time expired to put up six more points, making the final score 19–10.

With the win the Eagles would improve to 13–2 on the season and clinch the No. 1 seed and home-field advantage throughout the NFC Playoffs.

Despite the achievements, the offense played poorly. The defense stepped up after the Amari Cooper touchdown.

==== Week 17: vs. Dallas Cowboys ====
Week Seventeen: Dallas Cowboys at Philadelphia Eagles – Game summary

Quarter	1	2	3	4	Total
**Cowboys**	0	0	0	6	**6**
Eagles	0	0	0	0	**0**

at Lincoln Financial Field, Philadelphia, Pennsylvania

- Date: December 31
- Game time: 1:00 pm. EST
- Game weather: 19 °F (−7 °C), sunny
- Game attendance: 69,596
- Referee: John Parry
- TV announcers (Fox): Kenny Albert, Ronde Barber and Kristina Pink
- Recap, Gamebook

Game information

**First quarter**

- no scoring

**Second quarter**

- no scoring

**Third quarter**

- no scoring

**Fourth quarter**

- DAL – Brice Butler 20-yard pass from Dak Prescott (Dan Bailey kick failed), 12:19. Cowboys 6–0. **Drive: 12 plays, 99 yards, 5:48.**

**Top passers**

- DAL – Dak Prescott: 17/30, 179 yards, TD
- PHI – Nate Sudfeld: 19/23, 134 yards

**Top rushers**

- DAL – Ezekiel Elliott: 27 rushes, 103 yards
- PHI – LeGarrette Blount: 9 rushes, 37 yards

**Top receivers**

- DAL – Brice Butler: 2 receptions, 50 yards, TD
- PHI – Mack Hollins: 3 receptions, 25 yards

**Top tacklers**

- DAL – Sean Lee: 7 tackles, 1 assist
- PHI – Jaylen Watkins: 7 tackles

In a meaningless Week 17 game for both teams and a mirror image of last year's season finale, the 13–2 Eagles rested several of their starters against the Dallas Cowboys, while playing others briefly. Nick Foles stayed in for one quarter, struggling to a stat line of 4-of-11 for 39 yards and an interception. Third-string quarterback Nate Sudfeld replaced Foles for the remaining three-quarters, throwing 19 completions in 23 attempts, for 134 yards, no touchdowns, and no interceptions. Dak Prescott's 20-yard touchdown pass to Brice Butler early in the fourth quarter was the only score all game and Dallas narrowly prevailed, 6–0.

This was the first NFL game in 60 years (and as of 2024, most recent) for a 6–0 final occur via a touchdown and missed extra point (instead of two field goals). Ironically, the Eagles were also the losing team in the last such occurrence, falling to the Steelers in Pittsburgh.

With the loss, the Eagles dropped to 13–3 and were unable to set a franchise record for most wins in a 16-game season (the 2017 Eagles tied the 2004 team with 13 wins). It was also the first shutout loss for the Eagles since a 24–0 loss to the Cowboys in Week 17 of the 2009 season. It was also the Eagles' third overall shutout loss at Lincoln Financial Field, and their first since a 42–0 shellacking in 2005 against the Seattle Seahawks. The Eagles were also unable to sweep the NFC East for the first time since 2004.

Despite only playing for a quarter, Foles played poorly for the second straight week. This left many Eagles fans and sportswriters questioning how they would perform in the playoffs, setting the stage for the underdog theme.

== Standings ==
=== Division ===
NFC East
	W	L	T	PCT	DIV	CONF	PF	PA	STK
^{(1)} Philadelphia Eagles	13	3	0	.813	5–1	10–2	457	295	L1
Dallas Cowboys	9	7	0	.563	5–1	7–5	354	332	W1
Washington Redskins	7	9	0	.438	1–5	5–7	342	388	L1
New York Giants	3	13	0	.188	1–5	1–11	246	388	W1

=== Conference ===
NFC
#	Team	Division	W	L	T	PCT	DIV	CONF	SOS	SOV	STK
Division leaders
1 (Note: Philadelphia claimed the No. 1 seed over Minnesota based on winning percentage vs. common opponents. Philadelphia's cumulative record against Carolina, Chicago, the Los Angeles Rams and Washington was 5–0, compared to Minnesota's 4–1 cumulative record against the same four teams.)	Philadelphia Eagles	East	13	3	0	.813	5–1	10–2	.461	.433	L1
2	Minnesota Vikings	North	13	3	0	.813	5–1	10–2	.492	.447	W3
3 (Note: LA Rams claimed the No. 3 seed over New Orleans based on head-to-head victory.)	Los Angeles Rams	West	11	5	0	.688	4–2	7–5	.504	.460	L1
4 (Note: New Orleans clinched the NFC South division over Carolina based on head-to-head sweep.)	New Orleans Saints	South	11	5	0	.688	4–2	8–4	.535	.483	L1
Wild Cards
5	Carolina Panthers	South	11	5	0	.688	3–3	7–5	.539	.500	L1
6	Atlanta Falcons	South	10	6	0	.625	4–2	9–3	.543	.475	W1
Did not qualify for the postseason
7 (Note: Detroit finished ahead of Dallas and Seattle based on conference record, while Seattle finished ahead of Dallas based on head-to-head victory.)	Detroit Lions	North	9	7	0	.563	5–1	8–4	.496	.368	W1
8	Seattle Seahawks	West	9	7	0	.563	4–2	7–5	.492	.444	L1
9	Dallas Cowboys	East	9	7	0	.563	5–1	7–5	.496	.438	W1
10	Arizona Cardinals	West	8	8	0	.500	3–3	5–7	.488	.406	W2
11 (Note: Green Bay finished ahead of Washington based on record vs. common opponents. Green Bay's cumulative record against Dallas, Minnesota, New Orleans and Seattle was 2–3, compared to Washington's 1–4 cumulative record against the same four teams.)	Green Bay Packers	North	7	9	0	.438	2–4	5–7	.539	.357	L3
12	Washington Redskins	East	7	9	0	.438	1–5	5–7	.539	.429	L1
13	San Francisco 49ers	West	6	10	0	.375	1–5	3–9	.512	.438	W5
14 (Note: Tampa Bay finished ahead of Chicago based on head-to-head victory.)	Tampa Bay Buccaneers	South	5	11	0	.313	1–5	3–9	.555	.375	W1
15	Chicago Bears	North	5	11	0	.313	0–6	1–11	.559	.500	L1
16	New York Giants	East	3	13	0	.188	1–5	1–11	.531	.458	W1
Tiebreakers (Note: When breaking ties for three or more teams under the NFL's rules, they are first broken within divisions, then comparing only the highest-ranked remaining team from each division.)

=== Team leaders ===
Category	Player(s)	Value
Passing yards	Carson Wentz	3,296
Passing touchdowns	Carson Wentz	33
Rushing yards	LeGarrette Blount	766
Rushing touchdowns	Corey Clement	4
Receptions	Zach Ertz	74
Receiving yards	Zach Ertz	824
Receiving touchdowns	Alshon Jeffery	9
Points	Jake Elliott	117
Kickoff return yards	Kenjon Barner	194
Punt return yards	Kenjon Barner	240
Tackles	Nigel Bradham	88
Sacks	Brandon Graham	9.5
Forced fumbles	Chris Long	4
Interceptions	Patrick Robinson	4

== Postseason ==
=== Schedule ===
Round	Date	Opponent (seed)	Result	Record	Venue	Recap
Wild Card	First-round bye					
Divisional	January 13, 2018	Atlanta Falcons (6)	W 15–10	1–0	Lincoln Financial Field	Recap
NFC Championship	January 21, 2018	Minnesota Vikings (2)	W 38–7	2–0	Lincoln Financial Field	Recap
Super Bowl LII	February 4, 2018	vs. New England Patriots (A1)	W 41–33	3–0	U.S. Bank Stadium	Recap

=== Game summaries ===
==== NFC Divisional Playoffs: vs. (6) Atlanta Falcons ====
NFC Divisional Playoffs: (6) Atlanta Falcons at (1) Philadelphia Eagles – Game summary

Quarter	1	2	3	4	Total
Falcons	3	7	0	0	10
Eagles	0	9	3	3	15

at Lincoln Financial Field, Philadelphia, Pennsylvania

- Date: January 13, 2018
- Game time: 4:35 p.m. EST
- Game weather: 32 °F (0 °C), sunny
- Game attendance: 69,596
- Referee: Bill Vinovich
- TV announcers (NBC): Al Michaels, Cris Collinsworth and Michele Tafoya
- Recap, Gamebook

Game information

1st quarter

- ATL – Matt Bryant 33-yard field goal, 9:05. Falcons 3–0. Drive: 11 plays, 59 yards, 5:32.

2nd quarter

- PHI – LeGarrette Blount 1-yard run (Jake Elliott kick failed), 10:28. Eagles 6–3. Drive: 14 plays, 86 yards, 6:44.
- ATL – Devonta Freeman 6-yard pass from Matt Ryan (Matt Bryant kick), 5:41. Falcons 10–6. Drive: 4 plays, 18 yards, 1:50.
- PHI – Jake Elliott 53-yard field goal, 0:00. Falcons 10–9. Drive: 5 plays, 37 yards, 0:46.

3rd quarter

- PHI – Jake Elliott 37-yard field goal, 0:11. Eagles 12–10. Drive: 12 plays, 74 yards, 5:42.

4th quarter

- PHI – Jake Elliott 21-yard field goal, 6:02. Eagles 15–10. Drive: 14 plays, 80 yards, 7:57.

Top passers

- ATL – Matt Ryan – 22/36, 210 yards, TD
- PHI – Nick Foles – 23/30, 246 yards

Top rushers

- ATL – Tevin Coleman – 10 rushes, 79 yards
- PHI – Jay Ajayi – 15 rushes, 54 yards

Top receivers

- ATL – Julio Jones – 9 receptions, 101 yards
- PHI – Alshon Jeffery – 4 receptions, 61 yards

Following a theme set in the last two games of the regular season, the Eagles relied heavily on their defense, surrendering just 10 points to a strong Falcons offense.

The defining moment of the game came up on the Atlanta's final drive when the Eagles defense thwarted four Falcons scoring attempts.

On 4th and goal from the 2-yard line, Matt Ryan threw an incomplete pass to Julio Jones, essentially sealing a 15–10 win for the Eagles. Against many analyst predictions, the top seeded Philadelphia Eagles advanced to the NFC Championship game. This marked the first playoff win for the Eagles in nine seasons, and the first major Philadelphia sports franchise to advance in the playoffs since the 76ers defeated the Chicago Bulls in the first round of the 2012 NBA playoffs.

==== NFC Championship: vs. (2) Minnesota Vikings ====
NFC Championship: (2) Minnesota Vikings at (1) Philadelphia Eagles – Game summary

Quarter	1	2	3	4	Total
Vikings	7	0	0	0	7
Eagles	7	17	7	7	38

at Lincoln Financial Field, Philadelphia, Pennsylvania

- Date: January 21, 2018
- Game time: 6:40 pm. EST
- Game weather: 47 °F (8 °C), cloudy
- Game attendance: 69,596
- Referee: Ed Hochuli
- TV announcers (Fox): Joe Buck, Troy Aikman, Erin Andrews and Chris Myers
- Recap, Gamebook

Game information

First quarter

- MIN – Kyle Rudolph 25-yard pass from Case Keenum (Kai Forbath kick), 10:14. Vikings 7–0. Drive: 9 plays, 75 yards, 4:46.
- PHI – Patrick Robinson 50-yard interception return (Jake Elliott kick), 6:26. Tied 7–7.

Second quarter

- PHI – LeGarrette Blount 11-yard run (Jake Elliott kick), 13:37. Eagles 14–7. Drive: 12 plays, 75 yards, 6:20.
- PHI – Alshon Jeffery 53-yard pass from Nick Foles (Jake Elliott kick), 1:09. Eagles 21–7. Drive: 7 plays, 76 yards, 2:07.
- PHI – Jake Elliott 38-yard field goal, 0:00. Eagles 24–7. Drive: 4 plays, 60 yards, 0:29.

Third quarter

- PHI – Torrey Smith 41-yard pass from Nick Foles (Jake Elliott kick), 10:05. Eagles 31–7. Drive: 8 plays, 75 yards, 4:55.

Fourth quarter

- PHI – Alshon Jeffery 5-yard pass from Nick Foles (Jake Elliott kick), 14:10. Eagles 38–7. Drive: 12 plays, 92 yards, 7:11.

Top passers

- MIN – Case Keenum – 28/48, 271 yards, TD, 2 INT
- PHI – Nick Foles – 26/33, 352 yards, 3 TD

Top rushers

- MIN – Jerick McKinnon – 10 rushes, 40 yards
- PHI – Jay Ajayi – 18 rushes, 73 yards

Top receivers

- MIN – Jerick McKinnon – 11 receptions, 86 yards
- PHI – Zach Ertz – 8 receptions, 93 yards

Though the Eagles allowed a Vikings touchdown on the opening drive, it was the Vikings' only score. Case Keenum's pick-six to Patrick Robinson changed the game, as the rest of the game represented total domination from Nick Foles and the Eagles' offense, who racked up 456 total yards and 38 unanswered points. With a blowout win against one of the league's top defenses, the Eagles advanced to their third Super Bowl.

==== Super Bowl LII: vs. (A1) New England Patriots ====
Super Bowl LII: (N1) Philadelphia Eagles vs. (A1) New England Patriots – Game summary

Quarter	1	2	3	4	Total
Eagles	9	13	7	12	41
Patriots	3	9	14	7	33

at U.S. Bank Stadium, Minneapolis, Minnesota

- Date: February 4, 2018
- Game time: 6:30 pm. EST/5:30 p.m. CST
- Game weather: Played indoors (dome stadium)
- Game attendance: 67,612
- Referee: Gene Steratore
- TV announcers (NBC): Al Michaels, Cris Collinsworth and Michele Tafoya
- Recap, Gamebook

Game information

First quarter

- PHI – Jake Elliott 25-yard field goal, 7:55. Eagles 3–0. Drive: 14 plays, 67 yards, 7:05.
- NE – Stephen Gostkowski 26-yard field goal, 4:17. Tied 3–3. Drive: 9 plays, 67 yards, 3:38.
- PHI – Alshon Jeffery 34-yard pass from Nick Foles (Jake Elliott kick failed), 2:34. Eagles 9–3. Drive: 3 plays, 77 yards, 1:43.

Second quarter

- PHI – LeGarrette Blount 21-yard run (Nick Foles 2-point pass failed), 8:48. Eagles 15–3. Drive: 6 plays, 65 yards, 3:05.
- NE – Stephen Gostkowski 45-yard field goal, 7:24. Eagles 15–6. Drive: 5 plays, 48 yards, 1:24.
- NE – James White 26-yard run (Stephen Gostkowski kick failed), 2:04. Eagles 15–12. Drive: 7 plays, 90 yards, 2:57.
- PHI – Nick Foles 1-yard pass from Trey Burton (Jake Elliott kick), 0:34. Eagles 22–12. Drive: 7 plays, 70 yards, 1:30.

Third quarter

- NE – Rob Gronkowski 5-yard pass from Tom Brady (Stephen Gostkowski kick), 12:15. Eagles 22–19. Drive: 8 plays, 75 yards, 2:45.
- PHI – Corey Clement 22-yard pass from Nick Foles (Jake Elliott kick), 7:18. Eagles 29–19. Drive: 11 plays, 85 yards, 4:57.
- NE – Chris Hogan 26-yard pass from Tom Brady (Stephen Gostkowski kick), 3:23. Eagles 29–26. Drive: 7 plays, 75 yards, 3:55.

Fourth quarter

- PHI – Jake Elliott 42-yard field goal, 14:09. Eagles 32–26. Drive: 8 plays, 51 yards, 4:14.
- NE – Rob Gronkowski 4-yard pass from Tom Brady (Stephen Gostkowski kick), 9:22. Patriots 33–32. Drive: 10 plays, 75 yards, 4:47.
- PHI – Zach Ertz 11-yard pass from Nick Foles (Nick Foles 2-point pass failed), 2:21. Eagles 38–33. Drive: 14 plays, 75 yards, 7:01.
- PHI – Jake Elliott 46-yard field goal, 1:05. Eagles 41–33. Drive: 4 plays, 4 yards, 1:04.

Top passers

- PHI – Nick Foles – 28/43, 373 yards, 3 TD, INT
- NE – Tom Brady – 28/48, 505 yards, 3 TD

Top rushers

- PHI – LeGarrette Blount – 14 rushes, 90 yards, TD
- NE – James White – 7 rushes, 45 yards, TD

Top receivers

- PHI – Nelson Agholor – 9 receptions, 84 yards
- NE – Rob Gronkowski – 9 receptions, 116 yards, 2 TD

The Philadelphia Eagles entered Super Bowl LII as a 5.5-point underdog to the defending champions; the New England Patriots. This was also their first appearance in 13 years, with their last Super Bowl berth happening in 2005 (Super Bowl XXXIX), also against the New England Patriots.

In the first quarter, the Eagles managed to score first when Jake Elliott kicked a 25-yard field goal to make the score 3–0. However, the Pats would then tie the game up at 3–3 when Stephen Gostkowski kicked a 26-yard field goal. The Eagles retook the lead when Nick Foles found Alshon Jeffery on a 34-yard pass (with a failed PAT) to make it 9–3 to close out the first quarter. The Eagles increased their lead in the second quarter when LeGarrette Blount ran for a 21-yard touchdown (with a failed 2-point conversion) to make it 15–3. The Pats, however, managed to score twice when Gostkowski kicked a 45-yard field goal, followed up by James White running for a 26-yard touchdown (with a failed PAT) to make it 15–6 and then 15–12. A trick play saw Foles score a receiving touchdown off a 1-yard pass from tight end Trey Burton to make it 22–12 at halftime.

In the third quarter, the Pats drew closer when Tom Brady found Rob Gronkowski on a 5-yard pass to make it 22–19. However, the Eagles managed to pull away again when Foles found Corey Clement on a 22-yard pass to make it 29–19. The Pats closed out the quarter by getting close again when Brady found Chris Hogan on a 26-yard pass to make the score 29–26. In the fourth quarter, the Eagles moved further ahead when Elliott kicked a 42-yard field goal to make the score 32–26. The Pats would finally take the lead when Brady found Gronkowski again on a 5-yard pass to make the score 33–32. The Eagles would respond with a 14-play, 75-yard drive when Foles found Zach Ertz on an 11-yard pass (with a failed 2-point conversion), giving the Eagles the lead, 38–33. On the Patriots' following possession, with 2:16 to play, Brady was sacked by Brandon Graham and fumbled the ball, which was recovered by Derek Barnett at the Patriots' 31-yard line. The Eagles would increase their lead on Elliott's 46-yard field goal to 41–33.

Starting with less than a minute left and no time outs, the Patriots were able to advance the ball almost to midfield. With under 10 seconds remaining, Brady (who had set a Super Bowl passing record of 505 yards) attempted a Hail Mary pass that could have sent the game into overtime with a touchdown and 2-point conversion. However, Gronkowski would be blanketed in the end zone by Eagles defenders, who knocked the ball incomplete as the clock ran out, ending the Patriots' last hope.

With this win, the Eagles won their first Super Bowl and their first NFL title since 1960. Both teams managed to set an all-time NFL record for total combined yards in a game (1,151), and the 74 game points were one short of the Super Bowl record set in 1995.

The Eagles' victory parade took place four days later on February 8, highlighted by a rousing six-minute speech by center Jason Kelce.

A private ceremony was held at 2300 Arena on June 14, 2018 where the Eagles received their Super Bowl rings. Meek Mill performed his song "Dreams and Nightmares" at the event, which the team had adopted as its anthem for the season.

== Awards and honors ==
Recipient	awards
Jake Elliott	Week 3: NFC Special Teams Player of the Week
Kenjon Barner	Week 5: NFC Special Teams Player of the Week
Carson Wentz	Week 7: NFC Offensive Player of the Week; October 2017: NFC Offensive Player of the Month; Bert Bell Award
Jalen Mills	Week 8: NFC Defensive Player of the Week
Eagles Defense	NFL Celebration of the Year (Electric Slide)
Nick Foles	Super Bowl Most Valuable Player
