= Tracy Porter =

American football player (born 1986)

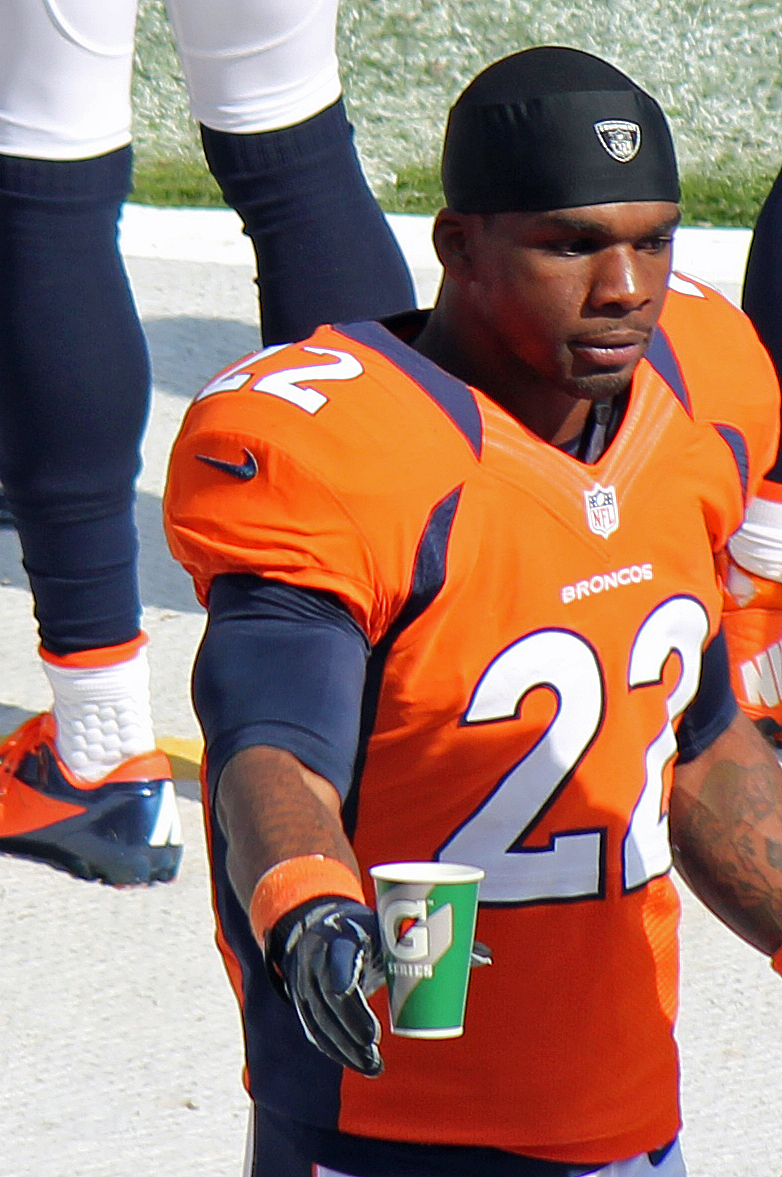
- Porter with the Denver Broncos in 2012

No. 22, 23, 21
- Position: Cornerback

Personal information
- Born: August 11, 1986 (age 40); Port Allen, Louisiana, U.S.
- Listed height: 5 ft 11 in (1.80 m)
- Listed weight: 185 lb (84 kg)

Career information
- High school: Port Allen
- College: Indiana (2004–2007)
- NFL draft: 2008: 2nd round, 40th overall pick

Career history
- New Orleans Saints (2008–2011); Denver Broncos (2012); Oakland Raiders (2013); Washington Redskins (2014); Chicago Bears (2015–2016)

Awards and highlights
- Super Bowl champion (XLIV); New Orleans Saints Hall of Fame; First-team All-Big Ten (2007); Second-team All-Big Ten (2006)

Career NFL statistics
- Total tackles: 371
- Sacks: 2.5
- Forced fumbles: 6
- Fumble recoveries: 3
- Interceptions: 13
- Defensive touchdowns: 3
- Stats at Pro Football Reference

Tracy O'Neil Porter (born August 11, 1986) is an American former professional football player who was a cornerback in the National Football League (NFL). He played college football for the Indiana Hoosiers and was selected by the New Orleans Saints in the second round of the 2008 NFL draft. Porter is best known for being a crucial player during the Saints’ 2009 season, in which he intercepted Brett Favre in the NFC Championship Game and then won Super Bowl XLIV over the Indianapolis Colts, sealing the game by famously intercepting Peyton Manning and returning it for a touchdown.

Porter also played for the Denver Broncos, Oakland Raiders, Washington Redskins, and Chicago Bears.

== Early life ==
Porter attended Port Allen High School, where he played quarterback, running back, wide receiver, and cornerback. He earned first team All-District 3A honors in his first year of organized football as a junior and second-team as a senior after recording 93 tackles, 11 interceptions (two returned for touchdowns) and 14 pass breakups. He also returned two punts and two kickoffs each for touchdowns, averaging 47.0 yards per kick return and 28.0 per punt return.

In addition to football, Porter was also a starter at point guard for the basketball team and a sprinter on the track & field, where he posted a personal-best time of 10.4 seconds in the 100-meter dash.

== College career ==
Porter played college football at Indiana University Bloomington for the Hoosiers from 2004 to 2007. During his senior year, he earned All-Big Ten Conference first-team. He finished his career second in Hoosiers history with 16 career interceptions and first in interception yards with 413. He also became the first player in school history to return a punt, interception and fumble for touchdowns in his career. He finished his career with 212 tackles and 16 interceptions.

== Professional career ==
Porter attended the NFL Combine in Indianapolis and completed all of the combine and positional drills. He impressed scouts with his 40-yard dash and tied for tenth among all players at the combine. He also had the fourth best time in the short shuttle and 60-yard shuttle. On March 5, 2008, Porter participated at Indiana's pro day and chose to run the 40-yard dash (4.38s), 20-yard dash (2.51s), and 10-yard dash (1.46s). At the conclusion of the pre-draft process, Porter was projected to a third-round pick by NFL draft experts and scouts. He ranked as the 12th best cornerback prospect in the draft by DraftScout.com.

Pre-draft measurables
Height	Weight	Arm length	Hand span	40-yard dash	10-yard split	20-yard split	20-yard shuttle	Three-cone drill	Vertical jump	Broad jump	Bench press
5 ft 10 7/8 in (1.80 m)	188 lb (85 kg)	32 in (0.81 m)	9 3/8 in (0.24 m)	4.37 s	1.47 s	2.52 s	4.07 s	7.20 s	34 in (0.86 m)	10 ft 3 in (3.12 m)	18 reps
All values from NFL Combine

=== New Orleans Saints ===
==== 2008 ====
The New Orleans Saints selected Porter in the second round (40th overall) of the 2008 NFL draft. He was the seventh cornerback selected in 2008. On June 25, 2008, the Saints signed Porter to a four–year, $4.20 million contract that includes a signing bonus of $1.24 million.

He entered training camp as a possible candidate to begin the season as a starting cornerback in place of Mike McKenzie, as he was still recovering from suffering torn ligaments in 2007. His competition included Randall Gay, Aaron Glenn, and Jason David. Head coach Sean Payton named him a starting cornerback to begin the season and started him alongside Randall Gay.

On September 7, 2008, Porter made his professional regular season debut and earned his first career start in the New Orleans Saints' home-opener against the Tampa Bay Buccaneers and recorded three combined tackles (two solo) and made two pass deflections as they won 24–20. The following week, he set a season-high with nine combined tackles (eight solo) during a 24–29 loss at the Washington Redskins in Week 2. On September 28, 2008, Porter made three solo tackles, one pass deflection, made his first career interception, and also had his first career sack on J. T. O'Sullivan for an eight–yard loss during a 31–17 win against the San Francisco 49ers. His first career interception was on a pass thrown by J. T. O'Sullivan to wide receiver Arnaz Battle and was returned for 24–yards in the fourth quarter. In Week 5, Porter made three solo tackles and tied his season-high of two pass deflections before exiting in the fourth quarter of a 27–30 loss to the Minnesota Vikings due to an injury he suffered to his wrist on Monday Night Football. His injury occurred when quarterback Gus Frerotte threw a desperation heave to the endzone to wide receiver Bernard Berrian for a 33–yard touchdown to tie the game. While coming down into the endzone, Berrian collided with fellow wide receiver Aundrae Allison, Saints' safety Josh Bullocks, and Porter as well. On October 7, 2008, head coach Sean Payton announced that the Saints have placed Porter on season-ending injured reserve after he underwent surgery for a dislocated wrist. He finished his rookie season in 2008 with only 25 combined tackles (20 solo), five pass deflections, one sack, and one interception in five games and five starts.

==== 2009 ====
On January 15, 2009, the New Orleans Saints announced their decision to hire Gregg Williams as their defensive coordinator after they fired Gary Gibbs following the 2008 NFL season. Throughout training camp, Porter competed against Randall Gay, Jabari Greer, and 2009 first-round pick (14th overall) Malcolm Jenkins to earn a starting role at cornerback. Head coach Sean Payton named him the No. 1 starting cornerback to begin the season, alongside Jabari Greer.

On October 25, 2009, Porter set a season-high with nine combined tackles (six solo), made three pass deflections, and had the first-pick six of his career to secure a 46–34 victory at the Miami Dolphins. With the Saints leading 40–34 late in the fourth quarter, Porter intercepted a pass by quarterback Chad Henne to wide receiver Greg Camarillo on fourth and long and returned it for a 54–yard touchdown with 1:53 remaining. The following week, he recorded six solo tackles, made a pass deflection, and helped secure a 35–27 victory by intercepting a pass by Matt Ryan to tight end Tony Gonzalez in the fourth quarter in Week 8. In Week 10, Porter recorded two solo tackles before he exited during the third quarter of a 28–23 victory at the St. Louis Rams after he injured his leg when Usama Young's leg whipped into his as he attempted to make a tackle. He subsequently remained inactive for the next four games (Weeks 11–14) due to an injury he sustained to his MCL that would not require surgery. In Week 16, Porter made six solo tackles, one pass deflection, and set a career-high with his fourth interception of the season on a pass attempt by Josh Freeman to wide receiver Antonio Bryant as the Saints lost in overtime 17–20 against the Tampa Bay Buccaneers. He finished the season with a total of 58 combined tackles (49 solo), 12 pass deflections, four interceptions, and a touchdown in 12 games and 11 starts.

The New Orleans Saints finished the 2009 NFL season in first place in the NFC South with a 13–3 record to earn a first-round bye. On January 16, 2010, Porter started in his first career playoff appearance and recorded five solo tackles and made one pass deflection as the Saints defeated the Arizona Cardinals 45–14 in the Divisional Round. On January 24, 2010, Porter started in the NFC Championship Game and made five solo tackles, one pass deflection, forced a fumble, and sent the game into overtime by making a crucial interception on a pass attempt by Brett Favre to wide receiver Sidney Rice with only 18 seconds remaining tied with the Minnesota Vikings at 28–28 . The Saints defeated the Vikings in overtime 31–28 to advance to the Super Bowl. On February 7, 2010, Porter started in Super Bowl XLIV and made eight solo tackles, one pass break-up, and had a pick-six as the Saints defeated the Indianapolis Colts 31–17. With 3:24 remaining in the game, Porter anticipated a play and jumped a route while covering Reggie Wayne to intercept the pass of Peyton Manning and successfully returned it 74–yards for a touchdown to seal the victory for the Saints.

In post-game interviews, Porter attributed his play to film study in preparation for the Colts. "I'd seen it over and over – third down," Porter said. "That was a big route for them to convert on. Through the numerous amounts of film study that we've done all week in preparing for the Super Bowl... it all happened just like I was watching it on film. I made the break on it, and here comes the end zone."

==== 2010 ====
Throughout training camp, he competed to retain his role as a starting cornerback against Randall Gay, Jabari Greer, and 2010 first-round pick (32nd overall) Patrick Robinson. Head coach Sean Payton named him and Jabari Greer the starting cornerbacks to begin the season. On September 22, 2010, Porter set a season-high with seven combined tackles (three solo), made one pass deflection, and had his only interception of the season on a pass thrown by Alex Smith to wide receiver Michael Crabtree during the fourth quarter of a 25–22 victory at the San Francisco 49ers. He was inactive for four games (Weeks 5–8) due to a sprained MCL. In Week 13, he tied his season-high of seven combined tackles (five solo) and had one pass break-up during a 34–30 victory at the Cincinnati Bengals. He finished the 2010 NFL season with 60 combined tackles (45 solo), six pass deflections, two fumble recoveries, and one interception in 12 games and 12 starts.

==== 2011 ====
He returned to training camp slated as a starting cornerback under defensive coordinator Gregg Williams. Head coach Sean Payton named Porter and Jabari Greer the starting cornerbacks to begin the season. He was sidelined for two games (Weeks 2–3) after he suffered an injury to his calf. In Week 12, he set a season-high with 10 combined tackles (eight solo) and made one pass deflection as the Saints defeated the New York Giants 49–24. On December 4, 2011, Porter recorded seven combined tackles (five solo), had one pass break-up, and had his lone interception of the season on a pass by Matthew Stafford to wide receiver Nate Burleson late in the fourth quarter to seal a 17–31 victory against the Detroit Lions. He finished the season with a total of 52 combined tackles (42 solo), nine pass deflections, two forced fumbles, and one interception in 14 games and 11 starts.

=== Denver Broncos ===
On March 22, 2012, the Denver Broncos signed Porter to a one–year, $4 million contract that included a signing bonus of $1 million. He entered training camp slated as the de facto No. 2 starting cornerback under defensive coordinator Jack Del Rio following the departure of Andre' Goodman. Head coach John Fox named Porter a starting cornerback to begin the season, alongside No. 1 starting cornerback Champ Bailey.

On September 9, 2012, Porter started in the Denver Broncos' home-opener against the Pittsburgh Steelers and set a season-high with eight solo tackles, a career-high with five pass deflections, and sealed a 31–19 victory by intercepting a pass by Ben Roethlisberger to wide receiver Emmanuel Sanders and returned it 43–yards for a touchdown late in the fourth quarter. His performance earned him the AFC Defensive Player of the Week award. On October 14, 2012, prior to boarding a plane to San Diego for a Week 6 matchup at the San Diego Chargers, Porter began feeling light-headed and had a racing heartbeat that concerned Broncos' trainers enough that they chose to pull him from boarding the flight and remain inactive for the game. During the preseason, Porter had suffered a seizure and the concern was raised due to his recent medical episodes. He remained inactive for the next nine games (Weeks 6–15) due to his ongoing health concerns. On December 23, 2012, Porter returned, but almost immediately exited in the first quarter of a 12–34 victory against the Cleveland Browns after he sustained a concussion while colliding with wide receiver Josh Gordon as he attempted a tackle. He remained inactive in concussion protocol as the Broncos defeated the Kansas City Chiefs 38–3 in Week 17. He finished his lackluster 2012 NFL season with only 21 combined tackles (16 solo), six pass deflections, one interception, and a touchdown in six games and three starts.

=== Oakland Raiders ===
On April 1, 2013, the Oakland Raiders signed Porter to a one–year, $1.50 million contract that included an initial signing bonus of $135,000. He reunited with Raiders' head coach Dennis Allen who was his defensive coordinator with the Saints. Throughout training camp, he competed against Mike Jenkins and 2013 first-round pick (12th overall) D. J. Hayden.

On September 15, 2013, Porter recorded five solo tackles and set a season-high with three pass deflections as the Raiders defeated the Jacksonville Jaguars 19–9. In Week 8, he made two combined tackles (one solo), two pass deflections, and helped secure an 18–21 victory against the Pittsburgh Steelers by intercepting a pass by Ben Roethlisberger to wide receiver Antonio Brown late in the fourth quarter. On November 10, 2013, Porter made three solo tackles, one pass deflection, and had a pick-six after intercepting a pass by Eli Manning to wide receiver Victor Cruz during a 20–24 loss at the New York Giants. He became the first player in NFL history to return an interception for a touchdown against both Peyton and Eli Manning. On November 28, 2013, he set a season-high 11 combined tackles (seven solo) and made a pass deflection during a 24–31 loss at the Dallas Cowboys. He started in all 16 games throughout the 2013 NFL season for the first time in his career and set a career-high 67 combined tackles (53 solo), made 12 pass deflections, two interceptions, was credited with 1.5 sacks, and had one touchdown.

He entered free agency as an unrestricted free agent for the third consecutive year in-a-row and it was reported he had met with the New York Giants and the Washington Redskins.

=== Washington Redskins ===
On March 13, 2014, the Washington Redskins signed Porter to a two—year, $6 million contract that included a signing bonus of $2 million. The Redskins signed Porter following the departure of Josh Wilson in free agency. He was expected to compete against David Amerson to be the No. 2 starting cornerback alongside DeAngelo Hall. During the off-season, Porter underwent surgery on his shoulder. On August 30, 2014, Porter left practice after re-injuring his hamstring and would remain inactive for the first three games (Weeks 1–3) of the season. In Week 4, he recorded two tackles before exiting the Redskins' 34–45 loss to the New York Giants after injuring his shoulder. He would remain inactive for the next five games (Weeks 5–9). In Week 11, he set a season-high with two solo tackles and had one pass break-up during a 7–27 loss against the Tampa Bay Buccaneers. On November 26, 2014, the Redskins officially placed Porter on season-ending injured reserve due to his shoulder injury that required surgery on the AC joint and would be sidelined for the last five games (Weeks 13–17). He finished the 2014 NFL season with only five combined tackles (three solo) and made one pass deflection in three games and one start.

On May 27, 2015, the Washington Redskins officially released Porter.

=== Chicago Bears ===
==== 2015 ====
On June 8, 2015, the Chicago Bears signed Porter to a one–year, $870,000 contract. He was signed following the departure of Charles Tillman. He reunited with head coach John Fox, who had previously been his head coach during his short stint with the Denver Broncos. He entered training camp projected to earn a role as a starting cornerback. Head coach John Fox named him a starting cornerback to start the regular season, opposite Kyle Fuller.

On August 29, 2015, Porter exited the Bears' 10–21 loss at the Cincinnati Bengals in the third preseason game after re-injuring his hamstring. His hamstring injury rendered him inactive for the first two games (Weeks 1–2) of the season. In Week 4, he earned his first start with the Bears, in place of Alan Ball, who was sidelined due to a groin injury. He recorded two solo tackles and had one pass deflection while also holding rookie wide receiver Amari Cooper to only four receptions for 46–yards after Cooper had over 100–yards receiving in his last two games. The Bears went on to defeat his former team, the Oakland Raiders, 22–20. The following game, Porter made two solo tackles and a pass deflection while also breaking up a third down pass thrown by Alex Smith to wide receiver Jeremy Maclin with 2:04 remaining. The Chiefs were forced to punt while they were leading 17–12 and the Bears would score immediately after Porter's crucial third down stop to defeat the Kansas City Chiefs 18–17. On November 26, 2015, Porter made one solo tackle, set a season-high with four pass deflections, and helped secure a 17–13 victory at the Green Bay Packers on Thanksgiving Day by intercepting a pass by Aaron Rodgers to wide receiver Davante Adams with only 3:38 remaining. Porter became the first player to break up four of Packers quarterback Aaron Rodgers' passes in a game. He also recorded his first interception as a Bear in the game. He finished the season with 35 combined tackles (34 solo), 12 pass deflections, and one interception in 12 games and 11 starts.

==== 2016 ====
On March 9, 2016, the Chicago Bears signed Porter to a three–year, $12.00 million contract with $4.25 million guaranteed and a signing bonus of $900,000. He entered training camp slated as the No. 1 starting cornerback under defensive coordinator Vic Fangio after Kyle Fuller underwent surgery for a knee injury. Head coach John Fox named him a starting cornerback to begin the season and paired him with Bryce Callahan.

On September 11, 2016, Porter made four combined tackles (three solo), one pass deflection, and had an interception on the opening drive of the game after picking off a pass by Brock Osweiler to wide receiver DeAndre Hopkins during a 14–23 loss at the Houston Texans. In Week 6, Porter set a season-high with two pass deflections and had his last career interception on a pass by Blake Bortles to wide receiver Allen Robinson during a 17–16 loss to the Jacksonville Jaguars. On October 31, 2016, he tied his season-high of six solo tackles during a 20–10 victory against the Minnesota Vikings. He started in all 16 games throughout the 2016 NFL season and finished with a total of 48 combined tackles (43 solo), made nine pass deflections, and two interceptions.

On April 10, 2017, Porter was released by the Chicago Bears after they had signed free agents Prince Amukamara and Marcus Cooper.

== Career statistics ==
Year	Team	Games		Tackles				Fumbles			Interceptions					
Year	Team	G	GS	Comb	Total	Ast	Sack	FF	FR	Yds	INT	Yds	Avg	Lng	TD	PD
2008	NO	5	5	25	23	2	1.0	0	0	0	1	25	25.0	25	0	5
2009	NO	12	11	57	48	9	0.0	2	0	0	4	72	18.0	54	1	12
2010	NO	12	12	60	45	15	0.0	0	1	2	1	5	5.0	5	0	6
2011	NO	14	11	52	42	10	0.0	2	1	0	1	−7	−7.0	−7	0	9
2012	DEN	6	4	21	16	5	0.0	0	0	0	1	43	43.0	43	1	6
2013	OAK	16	16	67	53	14	1.5	0	0	0	2	44	22.0	43	1	12
2014	WAS	3	1	5	3	2	0.0	0	0	0	0	0	0.0	0	0	1
2015	CHI	14	13	35	34	1	0.0	1	0	0	1	2	2.0	2	0	12
2016	CHI	16	15	48	45	3	0.0	1	0	0	2	28	14.0	25	0	9
Career		98	88	370	309	61	2.5	6	2	0	13	212	16.3	54	3	72

Key

- G: games played
- GS: games started
- Comb: combined tackles
- Total: total tackles
- Ast: assisted tackles
- Sack: sacks
- FF: forced fumbles
- FR: fumble recoveries
- Yds: yards
- INT: interceptions
- AVG IR: average interception return
- Lng: longest interception return
- TD: interceptions returned for touchdown
- PD: passes defensed
