= Patrick Robinson (cornerback) =

American football player (born 1987)

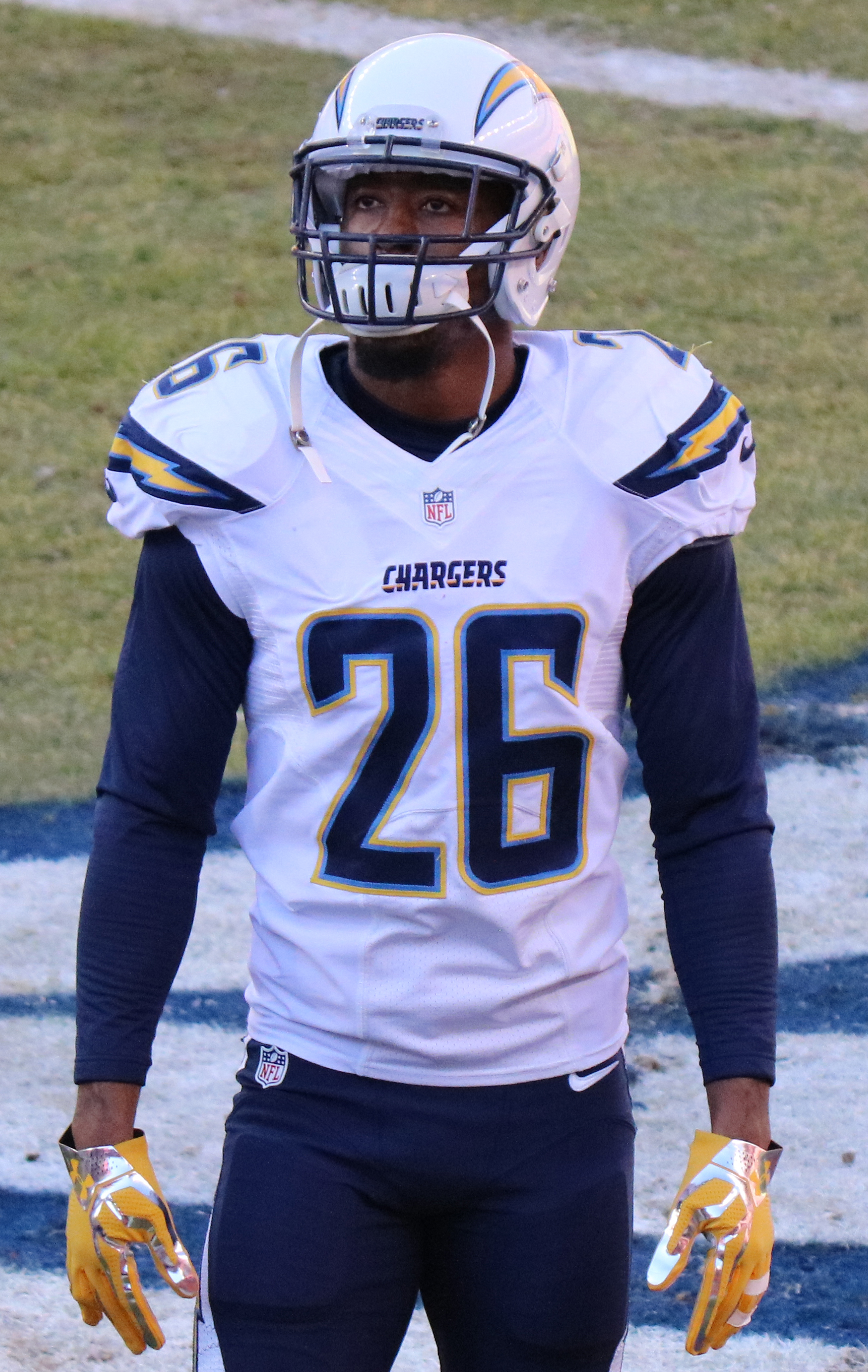
- Robinson with the San Diego Chargers in 2015

No. 34, 21, 26, 25
- Position: Cornerback

Personal information
- Born: September 7, 1987 (age 39); Miami, Florida, U.S.
- Listed height: 5 ft 11 in (1.80 m)
- Listed weight: 191 lb (87 kg)

Career information
- High school: Gulliver Prep (Pinecrest, Florida)
- College: Florida State (2006–2009)
- NFL draft: 2010: 1st round, 32nd overall pick

Career history
- New Orleans Saints (2010–2014); San Diego Chargers (2015); Indianapolis Colts (2016); Philadelphia Eagles (2017); New Orleans Saints (2018–2020)

Awards and highlights
- Super Bowl champion (LII); Second-team All-ACC (2009)

Career NFL statistics
- Total tackles: 338
- Sacks: 2.0
- Forced fumbles: 2
- Fumble recoveries: 1
- Interceptions: 16
- Defensive touchdowns: 1
- Stats at Pro Football Reference

Patrick Robinson (born September 7, 1987) is an American former professional football player who was a cornerback in the National Football League (NFL). He played college football for the Florida State Seminoles, and was selected by the Saints in the first round of the 2010 NFL draft. Robinson has also played for the San Diego Chargers, Indianapolis Colts and Philadelphia Eagles.

== Early life ==
Robinson attended South Miami High School before attending Gulliver Preparatory School. He was a two-sport star in football and track. He played both defensive back and wide receiver. As a senior, he had 11 interceptions on defense and ten touchdowns on offense. As a junior, he had 32 receptions for 491 yards and six touchdowns on offense and eight interceptions on defense.

Robinson was also a track star. He took third in the 200-meter dash at the FHSAA 2A Championships with a personal-best time of 21.05 seconds. He placed fourth at the state meet in the 100m with a time of 10.77. He ran a 21.70 in the prelims of the 200m before taking third at the regional meet. He also won the district title in the 100m (11.00) and 200m (22.30). His best time in the 100-meter dash was 10.65 seconds in the prelims at the regional meet.

Considered a four-star recruit by Rivals.com, Robinson was listed as the No. 16 cornerback prospect in the nation. He chose Florida State over Florida and Minnesota.

== College career ==
Robinson attended Florida State University from 2006 to 2009 under head coach Bobby Bowden. As a freshman in 2006, he played in 12 of 13 games and recording 11 tackles. He also blocked a PAT attempt that was returned for a touchdown by Tony Carter, making it first time in school history blocked PAT had been returned for a touchdown. As a sophomore in 2007 he started five of 12 games, recording 27 tackles and a team leading six interceptions. During the season, he set the school record for consecutive games with an interception with five. As a junior in 2008 he started eight of 13 games, recording 26 tackles and one interception. As a senior in 2009 he recorded 46 tackles.

He also ran track at Florida State in 2007. He scored points at the ACC meet by running a seventh place 22.16 in the finals of the 200m. He posted a collegiate-best of 22.06 seconds during the prelims. He notched a career-best time of 6.83 seconds to take 10th during the prelims of the 60-meter dash at the ACC Championships.

== Professional career ==
=== Pre-draft ===
Coming out of Florida State, Robinson was thought of as one of the top ten cornerbacks in the draft. He was invited to the NFL Combine and completed nearly every workout and drill, but chose not to run the shuttle. After his combine performance, analysts and scouts projected him to be a first or second round pick. DraftScout.com ranked him the sixth best cornerback in the draft. He participated at Florida State's Pro Day and ran the shuttle, three-cone drill, and chose to attempt to beat his combine numbers in the 40, 20, and 10-yard dash.

Pre-draft measurables
| Height | Weight | Arm length | Hand span | 40-yard dash | 10-yard split | 20-yard split | 20-yard shuttle | Three-cone drill | Vertical jump | Broad jump | Bench press |
|---|---|---|---|---|---|---|---|---|---|---|---|
| 5 ft 11 1/4 in (1.81 m) | 190 lb (86 kg) | 30 1/2 in (0.77 m) | 8 1/4 in (0.21 m) | 4.46 s | 1.50 s | 2.53 s | 4.14 s | 6.78 s | 39 in (0.99 m) | 10 ft 2 in (3.10 m) | 15 reps |
All values from NFL Combine (no shuttles, choice)

=== New Orleans Saints (first stint) ===
The New Orleans Saints selected Robinson in the first round (32nd overall) of the 2010 NFL draft. Robinson was the fifth cornerback drafted in 2010.

External videos
- Saints draft Patrick Robinson 32nd overall
- NFL Draft Profile: Patrick Robinson

==== 2010 ====
On July 29, 2010, the New Orleans Saints signed Robinson to a five–year, $9.40 million contract that includes $6.18 million guaranteed and an initial signing bonus of $2.21 million.

Throughout training camp, he competed to for a role as a starting cornerback against Jabari Greer, Tracy Porter, and Randall Gay under defensive coordinator Gregg Williams. Head coach Sean Payton named him a backup and listed him as the fourth cornerback on the depth chart to begin the season, behind Jabari Greer, Tracy Porter, and Randall Gay.

On September 9, 2010, Robinson made his professional regular season debut in the New Orleans Saints' home-opener against the Minnesota Vikings during a 14–9 victory. He was inactive as a healthy scratch as the Saints won 25–23 at the San Francisco 49ers. Randall Gay suffered a concussion during the game, prompting Robinson being elevated to the third cornerback on the depth chart entering Week 3. On September 26, 2010, he made his first career tackle and finished a 27–24 loss to the Atlanta Falcons with a total of five combined tackles (four solo) and a pass deflection. On October 10, 2010, Robinson earned his first career start in place of Tracy Porter, who suffered a knee injury the week prior, and set a season-high with eight solo tackles and made one pass deflection during a 30–20 loss to the Arizona Cardinals. He started the next four games and suffered an ankle injury on the first play of a Week 8 loss to the Pittsburgh Steelers. He subsequently remained inactive for the next two games (Weeks 9 and 11) due to his injury.

The next week, he suffered a knee injury against the Cincinnati Bengals and missed the next two games. He returned for the last two games and finished his rookie season with 28 combined tackles (26 solo) and two pass deflections in 11 games and four starts.

On January 8, 2011, Robinson played in his first career playoff game, a 36–41 loss against the Seattle Seahawks. He recorded one solo tackle in the Wild Card Round.

==== 2011 ====
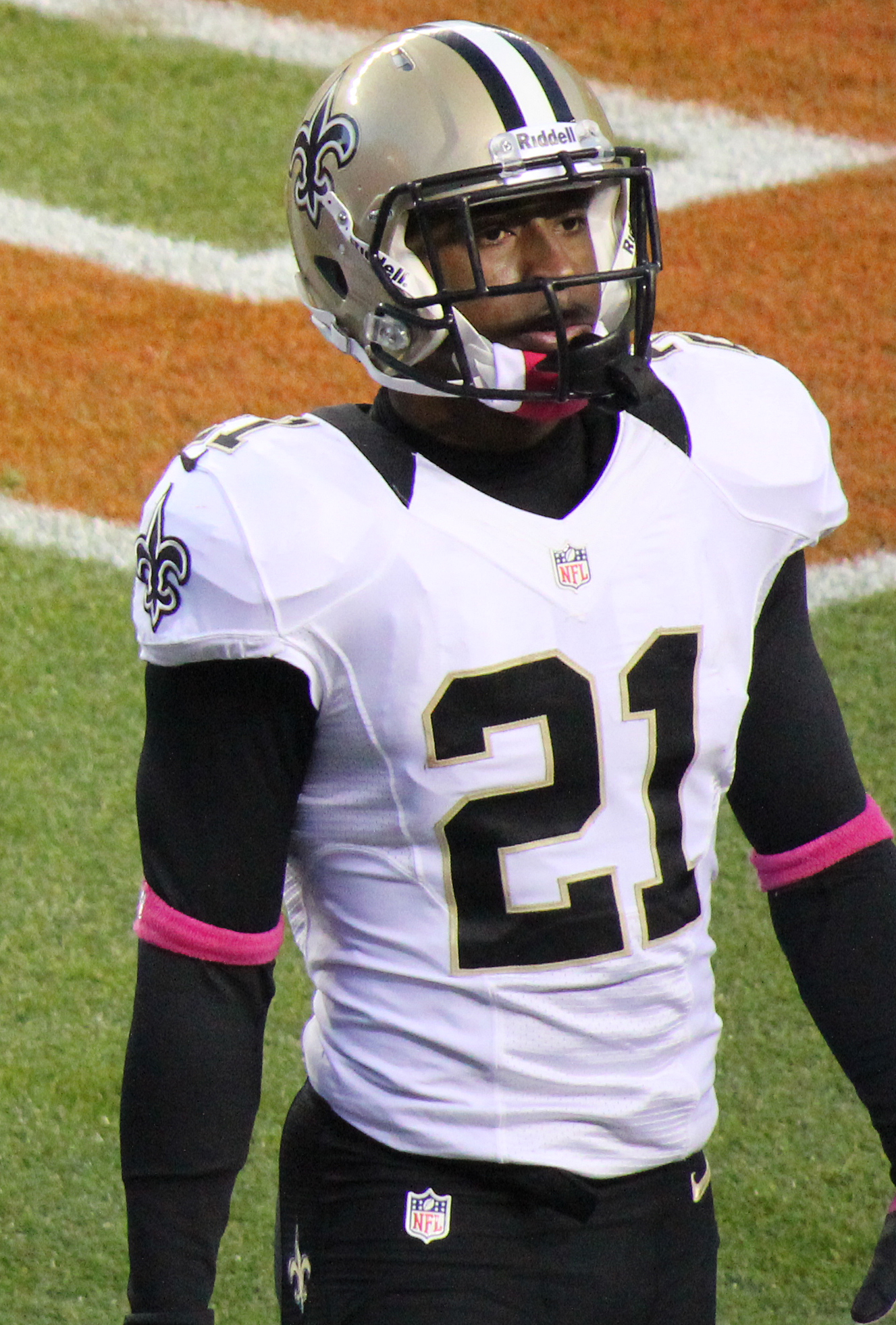
Robinson with the Saints in 2012

He began 2011 as the Saints' third-string cornerback behind Greer and Porter. Robinson played the season opener against the Green Bay Packers and made five solo tackles in a 42–34 loss. On October 2, 2011, he recorded one solo tackle, deflected two passes, and intercepted Blaine Gabbert for his first career pick in a 23–10 win over the Jacksonville Jaguars. The next week, Robinson assisted on a tackle, deflected a pass, and intercepted Cam Newton in a 30–27 victory over the Carolina Panthers. During a Week 12 matchup against the New York Giants, he racked up a season-high seven combined tackles as the Saints routed the Giants 49–24. On January 1, 2012, Robinson made four combined tackles and intercepted Can Newton in a 45–17 win over the Carolina Panthers. He finished his second season with the Saints with a total of 47 combined tackles (38 solo), 15 pass deflections, and a career-high four interceptions in 15 games and seven starts.

After finishing the season first in the NFC South with a 13–3 record, the Saints received a playoff berth. On January 7, 2012, Robinson started his second career playoff game and made a solo tackle and a pass deflection in a 45–28 victory over the Detroit Lions in the Wild Card Round. He recorded four solo tackles in a 32–36 loss against San Francisco 49ers in the Divisional Round.

==== 2012 ====
Robinson entered the regular season as the Saints starting cornerback, opposite Jabari Greer, after Tracy Porter left via free agency. He started the Saints' season opener against the Washington Redskins and made three solo tackles and a pass deflection in a 40–32 loss. On September 23, 2012, he recorded a season-high eight combined tackles and three pass deflections in a 27–24 overtime loss to the Kansas City Chiefs. The next game, Robinson made two solo tackles, three pass deflections, and intercepted Aaron Rodgers in a 28–27 loss to the Green Bay Packers. On November 5, 2012, Robinson intercepted a pass from Michael Vick of the Philadelphia Eagles and returned it 99 yards for a touchdown, tying a Saints franchise record set by former Saints safety Darren Sharper. During a Week 16 matchup against the Dallas Cowboys, Robinson racked up a season-high seven solo tackles and an assisted tackle in a 34–31 overtime victory.

He finished the season with a career-high 64 combined tackles (53 solo), a career-high 18 pass deflections, three interceptions, and a touchdown in 16 games and 16 starts.

==== 2013 ====
Robinson entered training camp competing with Keenan Lewis to keep his starting cornerback role. He was named the third-string cornerback to begin the season, behind Keenan Lewis and Jabari Greer. In 2013, Robinson sustained a serious injury to his patella during the Saints' second game; on September 18, 2013, he was placed on the injured reserve list, ending his season. He finished the 2013 season with two combined tackles in two games.

==== 2014 ====
Robinson entered training camp competing with Champ Bailey for the starting cornerback position. He was named the starting cornerback alongside Keenan Lewis.

Robinson started the Saints season opener against the Atlanta Falcons and recorded three solo tackles in the 37–34 loss. The next week, he had a season-high six combined tackles and a pass deflection in a 26–24 loss to the Cleveland Browns. He was benched after the first quarter and replaced with Corey White and Brian Dixon after he was called for three penalties and gave up a three-yard touchdown to Miles Austin. Corey White remained the starting cornerback the next week. On October 5, 2014, Robinson made one tackle, two pass deflections, and intercepted Tampa Bay Buccaneers quarterback Mike Glennon in a 37–31 victory. He finished the season with 39 combined tackles (32 solo), 11 pass deflections, and two interceptions in 14 games and six starts.

=== San Diego Chargers ===
On March 19, 2015, the San Diego Chargers signed Robinson to a one-year, $2 million contract with $1.25 million guaranteed and a signing bonus of $1 million. He entered training camp competing with Jason Verrett, Brandon Flowers, and Steve Williams for the starting cornerback position. He was named the Chargers' third-string cornerback to begin the regular season. Robinson made his debut with the Chargers in their season opener against the Detroit Lions and made three combined tackles, a pass deflection, and intercepted Matt Stafford in a 33–28 victory. On September 27, 2015, he earned his first start of the season in place of Brandon Flowers and recorded five combined tackles and deflected a pass during a 31–14 loss to the Minnesota Vikings. During Week 13, Robinson made a season-high eight combined tackles and a pass deflection in a 17–3 loss to the Denver Broncos. The following week, he started against the Kansas City Chiefs and recorded two solo tackles in a 10–3 loss. He remained the starter for the rest of the season after Flowers was placed on injured reserve for a knee injury he suffered during the Denver Broncos game. He finished his only season in San Diego with 49 combined tackles (43 solo), eight pass deflections, and an interception in 16 games and ten starts as the Chargers went 4–12.

=== Indianapolis Colts ===
On March 23, 2016, the Indianapolis Colts signed Robinson to a three-year, $13.50 million contract with $6 million guaranteed and a signing bonus of $1.50 million. During training camp, He competed with Antonio Cromartie, Darius Butler, and Jalil Brown for the starting cornerback job. He was named the starting cornerback, alongside Vontae Davis, to begin the season.

He started the Indianapolis Colts season opener against the Detroit Lions and made five combined tackles and a pass deflection in a 39–35 loss. Robinson left the game with a concussion and missed the next two games. On October 5, 2016, Robinson made a season-high six combined tackles in a 29–23 win over the Chicago Bears. He missed the following game against the Houston Texans with a knee and hip injury. On December 13, 2016, the Indianapolis Colts placed him on injured-reserve for the rest of the year after a suffering a groin injury. He finished the season with 26 combined tackles (19 solo) and five pass deflections in seven games and six starts.

On March 10, 2017, Robinson was released by the Colts.

=== Philadelphia Eagles ===
On March 28, 2017, the Philadelphia Eagles signed Robinson to a one-year, $775,000 contract. He entered training camp competing with Ronald Darby, Jalen Mills, Rasul Douglas, Jaylen Watkins, and Ron Brooks for the starting cornerback position. Head coach Doug Pederson named Robinson the third cornerback on the Eagles' depth chart to begin the season, behind Ronald Darby and Jalen Mills.

Robinson made his Eagles debut in their season-opener against the Washington Redskins and recorded four solo tackles in the 30–17 victory. On September 24, 2017, he earned his first start of the season and collects five solo tackles, three pass deflections, and intercepted a pass attempt by New York Giants' quarterback Eli Manning during a 27–24 victory. He became the Eagles' starting nickelback in Week 6. Overall, in the 2017 season, he finished with 45 total tackles and four interceptions.

The Eagles finished with a 13–3 record in 2017 and made the playoffs. In the Divisional Round against the Atlanta Falcons, the Eagles won 15–10. In the NFC Championship against the Minnesota Vikings, Robinson recorded a 50-yard interception return for a touchdown in the first quarter of the 38–7 victory. Robinson won his first Super Bowl when the Eagles defeated the New England Patriots 41–33 in Super Bowl LII. Robinson recorded three tackles in the game and batted down Tom Brady's Hail Mary pass to end the game.

=== New Orleans Saints (second stint) ===
On March 14, 2018, Robinson signed a four-year, $20 million contract with the Saints. On September 25, 2018, Robinson was placed on injured reserve after suffering a broken ankle in Week 3.

In the 2019 season, Robinson appeared in 11 games and recorded 16 total tackles and two passes defensed. On December 12, 2020, Robinson was placed on injured reserve. He appeared in 12 games in the 2020 season. He started four games and recorded two interceptions and four passes defensed. He was activated for the Saints' Wild Card Round game on January 9, 2021.

On August 10, 2021, Robinson announced his retirement from the NFL.

== NFL career statistics ==
Regular season statistics
| Year | Team | Games | | Tackles | | | | Interceptions | | | | | | Fumbles | |
| Year | Team | GP | GS | Cmb | Solo | Ast | Sck | PD | Int | Yds | Avg | Lng | TD | FF | FR |
|---|---|---|---|---|---|---|---|---|---|---|---|---|---|---|---|
| 2010 | NO | 11 | 4 | 28 | 26 | 2 | 0.0 | 2 | – | – | – | – | – | 0 | 0 |
| 2011 | NO | 15 | 7 | 47 | 38 | 9 | 0.0 | 15 | 4 | 31 | 7.8 | 25 | 0 | 0 | 0 |
| 2012 | NO | 16 | 16 | 64 | 53 | 11 | 1.0 | 18 | 3 | 99 | 33.0 | 99T | 1 | 1 | 0 |
| 2013 | NO | 2 | 0 | 2 | 1 | 1 | 0.0 | 0 | – | – | – | – | – | 0 | 0 |
| 2014 | NO | 14 | 6 | 39 | 32 | 7 | 0.0 | 11 | 2 | 2 | 1.0 | 2 | 0 | 0 | 0 |
| 2015 | SD | 16 | 10 | 49 | 43 | 6 | 0.0 | 8 | 1 | 27 | 27.0 | 27 | 0 | 0 | 0 |
| 2016 | IND | 7 | 6 | 26 | 19 | 7 | 0.0 | 5 | – | – | – | – | – | 1 | 0 |
| 2017 | PHI | 16 | 8 | 47 | 39 | 8 | 1.0 | 18 | 4 | 36 | 9.0 | 19 | 0 | 0 | 1 |
| 2018 | NO | 3 | 1 | 6 | 5 | 1 | 0.0 | 0 | - | - | - | - | - | 0 | 0 |
| 2019 | NO | 11 | 0 | 16 | 14 | 2 | 0.0 | 2 | - | - | - | - | - | 0 | 0 |
| 2020 | NO | 12 | 4 | 14 | 11 | 3 | 0.0 | 4 | 2 | 0 | 0.0 | 0 | 0 | 0 | 0 |
| Total | | 123 | 62 | 338 | 281 | 57 | 2.0 | 83 | 16 | 195 | 12.2 | 99 | 1 | 2 | 1 |

Postseason statistics
| Year | Team | Games | | Tackles | | | | Interceptions | | | | | | Fumbles | |
| Year | Team | GP | GS | Cmb | Solo | Ast | Sck | PD | Int | Yds | Avg | Lng | TD | FF | FR |
|---|---|---|---|---|---|---|---|---|---|---|---|---|---|---|---|
| 2010 | NO | 1 | 1 | 1 | 1 | 0 | 0.0 | 1 | – | – | – | – | – | 0 | 0 |
| 2011 | NO | 2 | 1 | 5 | 5 | 0 | 0.0 | 1 | – | – | – | – | – | 0 | 0 |
| 2017 | PHI | 3 | 0 | 5 | 5 | 0 | 0.0 | 1 | 1 | 50 | 50.0 | 50 | 1 | 0 | 0 |
| 2019 | NO | 1 | 0 | 1 | 1 | 0 | 0.0 | 0 | - | - | - | - | - | 0 | 0 |
| 2020 | NO | 1 | 0 | 0 | 0 | 0 | 0.0 | 0 | - | - | - | - | - | 0 | 0 |
| Total | | 6 | 2 | 12 | 12 | 0.0 | 0 | 3 | 1 | 50 | 50.0 | 50 | 1 | 0 | 0 |
