= Tre Sullivan =

American football player (born 1994)

No. 37, 49
- Position: Safety

Personal information
- Born: December 21, 1994 (age 31); Takoma Park, Maryland, U.S.
- Listed height: 6 ft 0 in (1.83 m)
- Listed weight: 200 lb (91 kg)

Career information
- High school: Gwynn Park (Brandywine, Maryland)
- College: Shepherd
- NFL draft: 2017: undrafted

Career history
- Philadelphia Eagles (2017–2018)

Awards and highlights
- Super Bowl champion (LII); 2× First-team All-MEC (2015, 2016)

Career NFL statistics
- Total tackles: 17
- Forced fumbles: 0
- Fumble recoveries: 0
- Pass deflections: 0
- Interceptions: 0
- Stats at Pro Football Reference

Tre Sullivan (born December 21, 1994) is an American former professional football player who was a safety for the Philadelphia Eagles of the National Football League (NFL). He played college football for the Shepherd Rams.

== Professional career ==
Pre-draft measurables
Height	Weight	40-yard dash	10-yard split	20-yard split	20-yard shuttle	Three-cone drill	Vertical jump	Broad jump	Bench press
5 ft 11 in (1.80 m)	189 lb (86 kg)	4.61 s	1.55 s	2.60 s	4.14 s	7.01 s	32 1/2 in (0.83 m)	9 ft 10 in (3.00 m)	18 reps

Sullivan signed with the Philadelphia Eagles as an undrafted free agent on May 11, 2017. He was waived/injured by the Eagles on September 2, and placed on injured reserve. Sullivan was released by Philadelphia on September 8. On November 7, Sullivan was re-signed to the Eagles' practice squad. He was on the practice squad when the Eagles defeated the New England Patriots in Super Bowl LII.

Sullivan signed a reserve/future contract with the Eagles on February 7, 2018. Sullivan made the Eagles' initial 53-man roster, and appeared in his first career NFL game during the season opening 18–12 victory over the Atlanta Falcons on September 6. He was released the next day after a crucial special teams mistake, and was subsequently re-signed to the practice squad. Sullivan was promoted back to the active roster on October 10. He was waived by Philadelphia on August 28, 2019.

On October 16, 2019, Sullivan was selected by the DC Defenders with the 23rd overall pick in Phase 5 of the 2020 XFL draft.
