= Brandon Brown (American football executive) =

American football executive (born 1988)

New York Giants
- Title: Assistant general manager

Personal information
- Born: June 22, 1988 (age 38); Glen Cove, New York, U.S.

Career information
- Position: Defensive back
- High school: South Huntington (NY) St. Anthony's
- College: Fordham (2006-2009)

Career history
- New York Jets (2012) Pro personnel intern; Boston College (2013) Recruiting specialist; Boston College (2014) Assistant director of player personnel; Indianapolis Colts (2015) Scouting assistant; Indianapolis Colts (2016) Advance scout; Philadelphia Eagles (2017–2018) Assistant director of pro scouting; Philadelphia Eagles (2019–2020) Director of pro scouting; Philadelphia Eagles (2021) Director of player personnel; New York Giants (2022–present) Assistant general manager

Awards and highlights
- Super Bowl champion (LII)

Brandon Brown (born June 22, 1988) is an American football executive who is the assistant general manager for the New York Giants of the National Football League (NFL). He previously served in various scouting and executive roles for the Philadelphia Eagles from 2017 to 2021, helping build their Super Bowl LII championship roster.

Brown played college football at Fordham University as a defensive back from 2006 to 2009. He began his career as a pro personnel intern for the New York Jets in 2012 and has also previously served at Boston College, Indianapolis Colts and Philadelphia Eagles.

== Early life and education ==
Born in Glen Cove, New York, Brown attended St. Anthony's High School in South Huntington, New York. He then attended and played college football at Fordham University as a defensive back from 2006 to 2009. While at Fordham University, Brown earned a bachelor's degree in business administration with a dual concentration in entrepreneurship and communications media management in 2010. Brown then earned his Juris Doctor degree from Barry University School of Law in Orlando, Florida.

== Executive career ==
=== New York Jets ===
In 2012, Brown began his NFL career and was hired by the New York Jets as a pro personnel intern under general manager Mike Tannenbaum.

=== Boston College ===
In 2013, Brown joined Boston College as a recruiting specialist. In 2014, he was promoted to assistant director of player personnel.

=== Indianapolis Colts ===
In 2015, Brown was hired by the Indianapolis Colts as a scouting assistant under general manager Ryan Grigson, before being promoted to advance scout in 2016.

=== Philadelphia Eagles ===
In 2017, Brown was hired by the Philadelphia Eagles as their assistant director of pro scouting under general manager Howie Roseman. That year, the Eagles went to Super Bowl LII and the team defeated the New England Patriots 41–33 to win their first Super Bowl title in franchise history. On June 13, 2019, Brown was promoted director of pro scouting. On May 27, 2021, Brown was promoted to director of player personnel.

=== New York Giants ===
On February 7, 2022, Brown was hired by the New York Giants as their assistant general manager under general manager Joe Schoen.

In May 2026, Brown attended an NFL front office accelerator program as part of the annual owners' meetings in Orlando, Florida. He has also played a key role in the organization's sports science program.
