= 2015 Philadelphia Eagles season =

83rd season in franchise history

- Owner: Jeffrey Lurie
- General manager: Chip Kelly (de facto)
- Head coach: Chip Kelly (fired December 29; 6–9 record); Pat Shurmur (interim week 17; 1–0 record)
- Home stadium: Lincoln Financial Field

Results
- Record: 7–9
- Division place: 2nd NFC East
- Playoffs: Did not qualify
- Pro Bowlers: Fletcher Cox, DE; Jason Peters, OT; Darren Sproles, PR; Malcolm Jenkins, SS

Uniform
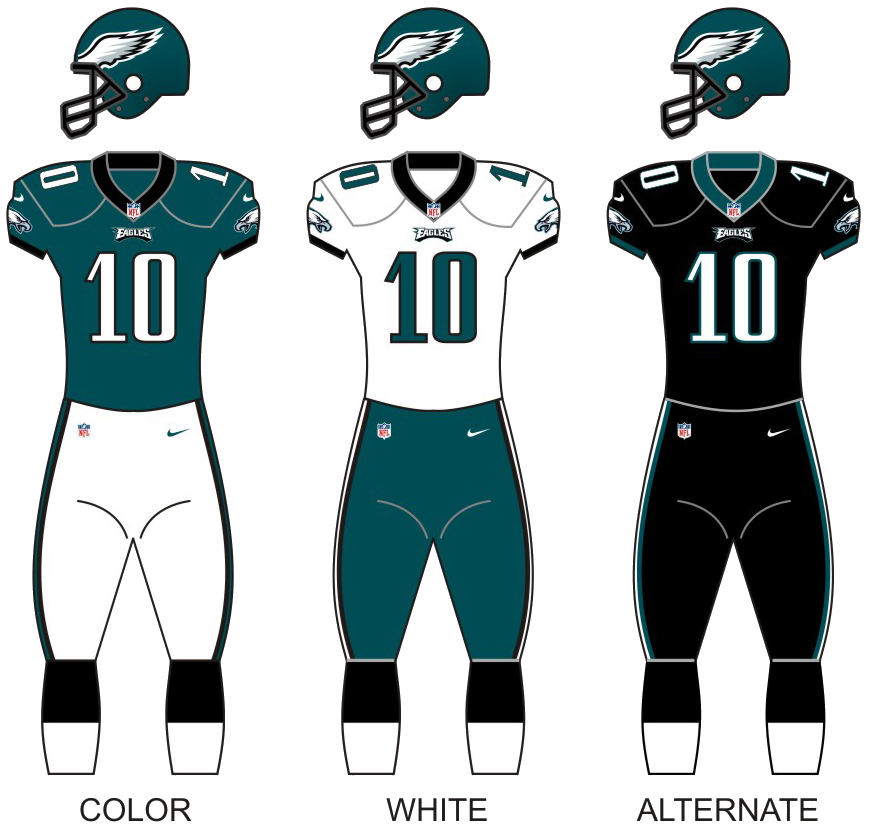

The 2015 season was the Philadelphia Eagles' 83rd in the National Football League (NFL), and their third and final year under head coach Chip Kelly. Acting as the de facto general manager, Kelly cut or traded several prominent starters, such as Nick Foles, Evan Mathis, Trent Cole, and 2013 rushing champion LeSean McCoy, while their leading receiver Jeremy Maclin left in free agency. Kelly brought in new players like Sam Bradford, Byron Maxwell, Kiko Alonso, and 2014 rushing champion DeMarco Murray, who he believed to better fit his system. The team also signed free agent quarterback Tim Tebow in what would be Tebow's last time playing in the NFL (excluding a brief preseason stint as a tight end for the Jacksonville Jaguars in 2021).

In a mirror image of 2014, the Eagles were eliminated from playoff contention in a Week 16 Saturday Night Football loss to the Washington Redskins. On December 29, 2015, Kelly was abruptly fired by the Eagles. Offensive coordinator Pat Shurmur would take over as interim head coach for the final week of the 2015 season.

== Roster changes ==
=== Free agents ===
Position	Player	Tag	2015 Team	Notes
S	Nate Allen	UFA	Oakland Raiders	4 years/$23 million deal
CB	Bradley Fletcher	UFA	New England Patriots	1 year/$2.5 million deal
OLB	Brandon Graham	UFA	Philadelphia Eagles	4 years/$26 million deal
WR	Jeremy Maclin	UFA	Kansas City Chiefs	5 years/$55 million deal
WR	Jeff Maehl	ERFA	Philadelphia Eagles	1 year/$660,000 deal
ILB	Casey Matthews	UFA	Minnesota Vikings	1 year/$825,000 deal
RB	Chris Polk	RFA	Houston Texans	1 year/$760,000 deal
QB	Mark Sanchez	UFA	Philadelphia Eagles	2 years/$9 million deal
WR	Brad Smith	UFA	Free agent	
DE	Cedric Thornton	RFA	Philadelphia Eagles	1 year/$2.52 million deal

Player re-signed by the Eagles

==== Signings ====
Position	Player	Tag	2014 Team	Date signed	Notes and references
ILB	Brad Jones	UFA	Green Bay Packers	March 2	Signed 2-year/$2.85 million deal
CB	Byron Maxwell	UFA	Seattle Seahawks	March 10	Signed 6-year/$63 million deal
CB	Walter Thurmond III	UFA	New York Giants	March 11	Signed 1 year/$3.25 million deal
RB	DeMarco Murray	UFA	Dallas Cowboys	March 12	Signed 5-year/$42 million deal
RB	Ryan Mathews	UFA	San Diego Chargers	March 12	Signed 3-year/$11.5 million deal
WR	Miles Austin	UFA	Cleveland Browns	March 30	Signed 1 year/$2.5 million deal
WR	Seyi Ajirotutu	UFA	San Diego Chargers	April 7	Signed 1-year deal
CB	E.J. Biggers	UFA	Washington Redskins	April 7	Signed 1-year deal
QB	Tim Tebow	UFA	Free agent	April 20	Signed 1-year deal
OG	Jared Wheeler	UFA	Free agent	June 15	Signed 1-year deal
OG	John Moffitt	UFA	Free agent	June 29	Signed 1-year deal

==== Trades ====
- On March 3, the Eagles agreed to trade running back LeSean McCoy to the Buffalo Bills for linebacker Kiko Alonso.
- On March 10, the Eagles traded quarterback Nick Foles to the St. Louis Rams for quarterback Sam Bradford and draft compensation.
- On September 4, the Eagles traded quarterback Matt Barkley to the Arizona Cardinals for a conditional seventh-round draft pick.

=== Roster changes ===
The Eagles released veterans James Casey, Todd Herremans, Trent Cole, Evan Mathis and Cary Williams prior to the official start of the new season.

== Draft ==
2015 Philadelphia Eagles draft
Round	Pick	Player	Position	College	Notes
1	20	Nelson Agholor	WR	USC	
2	47	Eric Rowe	CB	Utah	
3	84	Jordan Hicks	ILB	Texas	
6	191	JaCorey Shepherd	CB	Kansas	Placed on IR
6	196	Randall Evans	CB	Kansas St	On practice squad
7	237	Brian Mihalik	DE	Boston College	
Made roster † Pro Football Hall of Fame * Made at least one Pro Bowl during career

Notes

- The Eagles acquired an additional fourth-round selection (No. 113 overall) as part of a trade that sent running back Bryce Brown to the Buffalo Bills.
- The Eagles traded quarterback Nick Foles and their original fourth-round selection (No. 119 overall) to the St. Louis Rams in exchange for quarterback Sam Bradford and the Rams' fifth-round selection (No. 145 overall). The trade also included a possible 2016 conditional selection the Eagles could receive, based on Bradford's playing time in 2015. If Bradford took less than 50 percent of the snaps, the Eagles would receive the Rams' fourth-round selection; it would upgrade to a third-rounder if Bradford did not play at all in 2015.

=== Undrafted free agents ===
Position	Player	College	Notes
OG	Cole Manhart	Nebraska-Kearney	Released on June 29
OG	Brett Boyko	UNLV	Practice squad
WR	John Harris	Texas	Released on August 10
TE	Andrew Gleichert	Michigan State	Released on September 4
C	Mike Coccia	New Hampshire	Released on August 30
DE	Travis Raciti	San Jose State	Practice squad
OG	Malcolm Bunche	UCLA	Practice squad
RB	Raheem Mostert	Purdue	Dolphins practice squad
TE	Eric Tomlinson	UTEP	Released on September 4
WR	Rasheed Bailey	Delaware Valley	Released on September 4
LB	Jordan DeWalt-Ondijo	Duke	Released on August 18
CB	Denzel Rice	Coastal Carolina	Made 53-man roster
WR	Devante Davis	UNLV	Released on August 4
P	Kip Smith	Oklahoma State	Released on September 4
TE	Justin Tukes	UCF	Released on August 30
DE	B.J. McBryde	UConn	Released on August 14
RB	Kevin Monangai	Villanova	Practice squad
WR	Mike Johnson	Delaware	Released on August 30
WR	Josh Reese	UCF	Released on August 30

== Staff ==
2015 Philadelphia Eagles staff
Front office: Chairman/CEO – Jeffrey Lurie; President – Don Smolenski; Executive vice president of football operations – Howie Roseman; Vice president of player personnel - Ed Marynowitz; Senior director of player personnel – Tom Donahoe; Director of pro scouting – Dwayne Joseph; Senior Director of Pro Personnel − Louis Clark; Director of personnel operations – Joe Pannunzio; Director of scouting administration/strategic management – Chris Shea; Director of football administration – Jake Rosenberg; College scouting coordinator - Matt Lindsey; Assistant director of college scouting – Trey Brown; Personnel executive - Michael Davis; Head coaches: Head coach – Chip Kelly (fired on December 29); Interim head coach/offensive coordinator – Pat Shurmur; Assistant head coach/defensive line – Jerry Azzinaro; Offensive coaches: Quarterbacks – Ryan Day; Running backs – Duce Staley; Wide receivers – Bob Bicknell; Tight ends – Justin Peelle; Offensive line – Jeff Stoutland; Assistant offensive line – Greg Austin; Offensive quality control – Press Taylor	Defensive coaches: Defensive coordinator – Billy Davis; Assistant defensive line – Mike Dawson; Outside linebackers – Bill McGovern; Inside linebackers – Rick Minter; Assistant linebackers – Brian Smith; Defensive backs – Cory Undlin; Assistant Defensive Backs − Matthew Harper; Defensive quality control – Stephen Thomas; Special teams coaches: Special teams coordinator – Dave Fipp; Assistant special teams – Michael Clay; Strength and conditioning: Head strength and conditioning – Josh Hingst; Assistant strength and conditioning – Quadrian Banks; Assistant strength and conditioning – Keith Gray; Director of sports science and reconditioning – Shaun Huls

== Final roster ==
2015 Philadelphia Eagles roster
Quarterbacks (QB): 7 Sam Bradford; 9 Thad Lewis; 3 Mark Sanchez; Running backs (RB): 34 Kenjon Barner; 24 Ryan Mathews; 29 DeMarco Murray; 43 Darren Sproles; Wide receivers (WR): 17 Nelson Agholor; 16 Seyi Ajirotutu; 14 Riley Cooper; 13 Josh Huff; 10 Jonathan Krause; 81 Jordan Matthews; Tight ends (TE): 47 Trey Burton; 87 Brent Celek; 86 Zach Ertz	Offensive linemen (OL): 68 Josh Andrews G; 76 Allen Barbre G; 79 Tanner Hawkinson T; 65 Lane Johnson T; 77 Barrett Jones C; 62 Jason Kelce C; 67 Dennis Kelly T; 71 Jason Peters T; 64 Matt Tobin G; Defensive linemen (DL): 94 Beau Allen NT; 93 Brandon Bair DE; 91 Fletcher Cox DE; 75 Vinny Curry DE; 97 Taylor Hart DE; 72 Cedric Thornton DE	Linebackers (LB): 50 Kiko Alonso ILB; 98 Connor Barwin OLB; 56 Bryan Braman OLB; 53 Najee Goode ILB; 55 Brandon Graham OLB; 95 Mychal Kendricks ILB; 51 Steven Means OLB; 59 DeMeco Ryans ILB; 90 Marcus Smith OLB; Defensive backs (DB): 38 E. J. Biggers CB; 41 Randall Evans CB; 27 Malcolm Jenkins FS; 42 Chris Maragos FS; 31 Byron Maxwell CB; 30 Ed Reynolds SS; 35 Denzel Rice CB; 32 Eric Rowe CB; 26 Walter Thurmond SS; 37 Jaylen Watkins SS; Special teams (ST): 46 Jon Dorenbos LS; 8 Donnie Jones P; 6 Caleb Sturgis K	Practice squad: 73 Brett Boyko T; 74 Malcolm Bunche G; 52 Brandon Hepburn OLB; 33 Mike Lee CB; 80 Freddie Martino WR; 39 Kevin Monangai RB; 85 Chris Pantale TE; 78 Travis Raciti DE; 54 Deontae Skinner OLB; Reserve: 23 Nolan Carroll CB (IR); 21 Jerome Couplin SS (IR); 66 Andrew Gardner G (IR); 58 Jordan Hicks ILB (IR); 96 Bennie Logan NT (IR); 57 Travis Long OLB (IR); 63 David Molk C (IR); 1 Cody Parkey K (IR); 36 JaCorey Shepherd CB (IR); -- Matthew Tucker RB (NF-Inj.); Rookies in italics 53 active, 10 reserve, 9 practice squad

== Schedule ==
=== Preseason ===
Week	Date	Opponent	Result	Record	Venue	Recap
1	August 16	Indianapolis Colts	**W** 36–10	1–0	Lincoln Financial Field	Recap
2	August 22	Baltimore Ravens	**W** 40–17	2–0	Lincoln Financial Field	Recap
3	August 29	at Green Bay Packers	**W** 39–26	3–0	Lambeau Field	Recap
4	September 3	at New York Jets	**L** 18–24	3–1	MetLife Stadium	Recap

=== Regular season ===
Week	Date	Opponent	Result	Record	Venue	Recap
1	September 14	at Atlanta Falcons	**L** 24–26	0–1	Georgia Dome	Recap
2	September 20	**Dallas Cowboys**	**L** 10–20	0–2	Lincoln Financial Field	Recap
3	September 27	at New York Jets	**W** 24–17	1–2	MetLife Stadium	Recap
4	October 4	at **Washington Redskins**	**L** 20–23	1–3	FedExField	Recap
5	October 11	New Orleans Saints	**W** 39–17	2–3	Lincoln Financial Field	Recap
6	October 19	**New York Giants**	**W** 27–7	3–3	Lincoln Financial Field	Recap
7	October 25	at Carolina Panthers	**L** 16–27	3–4	Bank of America Stadium	Recap
8	Bye					
9	November 8	at **Dallas Cowboys**	**W** 33–27 (OT)	4–4	AT&T Stadium	Recap
10	November 15	Miami Dolphins	**L** 19–20	4–5	Lincoln Financial Field	Recap
11	November 22	Tampa Bay Buccaneers	**L** 17–45	4–6	Lincoln Financial Field	Recap
12	November 26	at Detroit Lions	**L** 14–45	4–7	Ford Field	Recap
13	December 6	at New England Patriots	**W** 35–28	5–7	Gillette Stadium	Recap
14	December 13	Buffalo Bills	**W** 23–20	6–7	Lincoln Financial Field	Recap
15	December 20	Arizona Cardinals	**L** 17–40	6–8	Lincoln Financial Field	Recap
16	December 26	**Washington Redskins**	**L** 24–38	6–9	Lincoln Financial Field	Recap
17	January 3	at **New York Giants**	**W** 35–30	7–9	MetLife Stadium	Recap

Note: Intra-division opponents are in bold text.

=== Game summaries ===
==== Week 1: at Atlanta Falcons ====
Week One: Philadelphia Eagles at Atlanta Falcons – Game summary

Quarter	1	2	3	4	Total
Eagles	0	3	14	7	**24**
**Falcons**	3	17	0	6	**26**

at Georgia Dome, Atlanta, Georgia

- Date: September 14
- Game time: 7:10 p.m. EDT
- Game weather: Played indoors (dome stadium)
- Game attendance: 70,516
- Referee: Terry McAulay
- TV announcers (ESPN): Mike Tirico, Jon Gruden and Lisa Salters
- Recap, Gamebook

Game information

**First quarter**

- ATL - 10:55 Matt Bryant 41-yard FG, ATL 3-0

**Second quarter**

- ATL - 10:44 Julio Jones 4-yard TD pass from Matt Ryan (Matt Bryant kick), ATL 10-0
- PHI - 7:18 Cody Parkey 29-yard FG, ATL 10-3
- ATL - 1:05 Matt Bryant 39-yard FG, ATL 13-3
- ATL - 0:45 Julio Jones 22-yard TD pass from Matt Ryan (Matt Bryant kick), ATL 20-3

**Third quarter**

- PHI - 13:13 DeMarco Murray 8-yard TD run (Cody Parkey kick), ATL 20-10
- PHI - 3:39 DeMarco Murray 5-yard TD pass from Sam Bradford (Cody Parkey kick), ATL 20-17

**Fourth quarter**

- ATL - 10:49 Matt Bryant 44-yard FG, ATL 23-17
- PHI - 8:37 Ryan Mathews 1-yard TD run (Cody Parkey kick), PHI 24-23
- ATL - 6:27 Matt Bryant 47-yard FG, ATL 26-24

**Top passers**

- PHI – Sam Bradford: 36/52, 336 yards, TD, 2 INT
- ATL – Matt Ryan: 23/34, 298 yards, 2 TD, 2 INT

**Top rushers**

- PHI – Darren Sproles: 5 rushes, 50 yards
- ATL – Tevin Coleman: 20 rushes, 80 yards

**Top receivers**

- PHI – Jordan Matthews: 10 receptions, 102 yards
- ATL – Julio Jones: 9 receptions, 141 yards, 2 TD

**Top tacklers**

- PHI – Byron Maxwell: 7 tackles, 2 assists
- ATL – Paul Worrilow: 9 tackles, 4 assists

The Eagles opened their season on the road against the Atlanta Falcons. Other than the one-handed Kiko Alonso interception in the end zone, Atlanta dominated in the first half, while former Legion of Boom cornerback Byron Maxwell had trouble covering Julio Jones. DeMarco Murray also struggled in the first half, as he had a 12-yard loss on one run. In the second half, the Eagles opened up with an interception on Matt Ryan by Walter Thurmond and scored on their next 3 possessions, and took the lead late in the 4th quarter. However, Matt Bryant kicked a field goal to give the Falcons back a 26–24 lead and the Eagles had a chance to come back. However, the Eagles were stopped on 3rd and 1, and Cody Parkey missed a 44-yard field goal attempt. Malcolm Jenkins then made a critical stop on 3rd down to force a Falcons punt. The Eagles' next drive ended as Sam Bradford threw a pass to Jordan Matthews, but the ball bounced off him and was intercepted by the Falcons, sealing a Falcons' victory. Reigning NFL rushing champ DeMarco Murray had 8 carries for 9 yards, which included an 8-yard touchdown run. Backup Darren Sproles picked up the slack by averaging 10 yards per carry and catching 7 passes for 76 yards.

The Eagles open their season at 0–1.

==== Week 2: vs. Dallas Cowboys ====
Week Two: Dallas Cowboys at Philadelphia Eagles – Game summary

Quarter	1	2	3	4	Total
**Cowboys**	3	3	7	7	**20**
Eagles	0	0	0	10	**10**

at Lincoln Financial Field, Philadelphia, Pennsylvania

- Date: September 20
- Game time: 4:25 pm. EDT
- Game weather: 77 °F (25 °C), partly cloudy
- Game attendance: 69,296
- Referee: Tony Corrente
- TV announcers (Fox): Joe Buck, Troy Aikman and Erin Andrews
- Recap, Gamebook

Game information

**First quarter**

- DAL – Dan Bailey 20-yard field goal, 1:42. Cowboys 3–0. **Drive: 12 plays, 79 yards, 6:04.**

**Second quarter**

- DAL – Dan Bailey 28-yard field goal, 0:02. Cowboys 6–0. **Drive: 15 plays, 79 yards, 5:24.**

**Third quarter**

- DAL - Donnie Jones punt blocked by Danny McCray, 26-yard return by Kyle Wilber (Dan Bailey kick), 12:44. Cowboys 13–0.

**Fourth quarter**

- PHI – Cody Parkey 46-yard field goal, 14:21. Cowboys 13–3. **Drive: 8 plays, 52 yards, 2:16.**
- DAL – Terrance Williams 42-yard pass from Brandon Weeden (Dan Bailey kick), 4:20. Cowboys 20–3. **Drive: 3 plays, 41 yards, 0:16.**
- PHI – Jordan Matthews 6-yard pass from Sam Bradford (Cody Parkey kick), 1:26. Cowboys 20–10. **Drive: 11 plays, 80 yards, 2:52.**

**Top passers**

- DAL – Tony Romo – 18/27, 195 yards
- PHI – Sam Bradford – 23/37, 224 yards, TD, 2 INT

**Top rushers**

- DAL – Joseph Randle – 18 rushes, 51 yards
- PHI – Sam Bradford – 2 rushes, 9 yards

**Top receivers**

- DAL – Terrance Williams – 4 receptions, 84 yards, TD
- PHI – Jordan Matthews – 6 receptions, 80 yards, TD

**Top tacklers**

- DAL – Sean Lee - 9 tackles, 5 assists
- PHI – Malcolm Jenkins - 8 tackles

The Eagles played poorly in a 20–10 loss to their divisional rival. The defense played a great game, but the offense was unable to convert it into points. Connor Barwin and Cedric Thornton each scored a sack, while Byron Maxwell forced a fumble that Malcolm Jenkins recovered. Rookie linebacker Jordan Hicks, who was filling in for injured stars Mychal Kendricks and Kiko Alonso, not only sacked Cowboys starter Tony Romo, but he also injured Romo and forced a fumble that Fletcher Cox recovered. However backup Brandon Weeden went 7/7 and scored a passing touchdown to seal the game. All Bradford could muster was a meaningless touchdown to Jordan Matthews in the fourth quarter. Ex-Cowboy DeMarco Murray was given the ball 13 times but only came up with 2 yards, bringing his total for the season at merely 11 rushing yards on 21 carries.

The Eagles dropped to 0–2, the first time since 2007 that the Eagles lost their first two regular season games.

==== Week 3: at New York Jets ====
Week Three: Philadelphia Eagles at New York Jets – Game summary

Quarter	1	2	3	4	Total
**Eagles**	3	21	0	0	**24**
Jets	0	7	0	10	**17**

at MetLife Stadium, East Rutherford, New Jersey

- Date: September 27
- Game time: 1:00 pm. EDT
- Game weather: 66 °F (19 °C), cloudy
- Game attendance: 78,160
- Referee: Gene Steratore
- TV announcers (Fox): Kevin Burkhardt, John Lynch and Pam Oliver
- Recap, Gamebook

Game information

**First quarter**

- PHI - 8:08 Cody Parkey 30-yard FG, PHI 3-0

**Second quarter**

- PHI - 12:21 Darren Sproles 89-yard punt return for a TD (Cody Parkey kick), PHI 10-0
- PHI - 4:57 Ryan Mathews 23-yard TD pass from Sam Bradford (Cody Parkey kick), PHI 17-0
- PHI - 2:11 Darren Sproles 1-yard TD run (Cody Parkey kick), PHI 24-0
- NYJ - 0:06 Brandon Marshall 16-yard TD pass from Ryan Fitzpatrick (Nick Folk kick), PHI 24-7

**Third quarter**

- No scoring plays

**Fourth quarter**

- NYJ - 9:37 Jeremy Kerley 7-yard TD pass from Ryan Fitzpatrick (Nick Folk kick), PHI 24-14
- NYJ - 2:34 Nick Folk 53-yard FG, PHI 24-17

**Top passers**

- PHI – Sam Bradford: 14/28, 118 yards, TD
- NYJ – Ryan Fitzpatrick: 35/58, 283 yards, 2 TD, 3 INT

**Top rushers**

- PHI – Ryan Mathews: 24 rushes, 108 yards
- NYJ – Bilal Powell: 10 rushes, 31 yards

**Top receivers**

- PHI – Jordan Matthews: 6 receptions, 49 yards
- NYJ – Brandon Marshall: 10 receptions, 109 yards, TD

**Top tacklers**

- PHI – Jordan Hicks: 9 tackles, 1 assist
- NYJ – Demario Davis: 6 tackles, 7 assists

As the visit of Pope Francis generated excitement in the city of Philadelphia, the Eagles made the first of two visits to MetLife Stadium to square off with the Jets. The Eagles improved their all-time head-to-head record against the Jets to 10–0. DeMarco Murray was out with a hamstring injury, but Ryan Mathews carried the load, rushing 25 times for 108 yards. Darren Sproles also ran for 17 yards and one touchdown, but the highlight of his game was an 89-yard punt return for a touchdown. In the first half, all areas of the Eagles dominated the Jets 24–7. Right before the first half ended, Brandon Marshall fumbled the ball on an ill-conceived lateral attempt, which was recovered the Eagles and turned into a Darren Sproles 1-yard touchdown run. In the second half, the Eagles attempted to mostly maintain the lead and run the clock out, using a majority of run plays that the Jets were able to predict. Eric Rowe, Jordan Hicks, and Walter Thurmond all intercepted Ryan Fitzpatrick in the game, who had done relatively well with turnovers until this game. The Jets would however score 10 unanswered points, but the Eagles would stop their comeback by recovering an onside kick and being able to get a first down off a last-minute Jets penalty.

The Eagles improved to 1–2 and were tied at 2nd place in the NFC East along with the Redskins and the Giants.

A day later, the Eagles announced that kicker Cody Parkey would undergo season-ending groin surgery.

==== Week 4: at Washington Redskins ====
Week Four: Philadelphia Eagles at Washington Redskins – Game summary

Quarter	1	2	3	4	Total
Eagles	0	0	13	7	**20**
**Redskins**	6	7	3	7	**23**

at FedExField, Landover, Maryland

- Date: October 4
- Game time: 1:00 pm. EDT
- Game weather: 58 °F (14 °C), cloudy
- Game attendance: 74,767
- Referee: Jerome Boger
- TV announcers (Fox): Dick Stockton, David Diehl and Kristina Pink
- Recap, Gamebook

Game information

**First quarter**

- WAS - 7:24 Dustin Hopkins 20-yard FG, WAS 3-0
- WAS - 0:51 Dustin Hopkins 38-yard FG, WAS 6-0

**Second quarter**

- WAS - 5:25 Kirk Cousins 1-yard TD (Dustin Hopkins kick), WAS 13-0

**Third quarter**

- PHI - 11:54 Riley Cooper 62-yard TD pass from Sam Bradford (Caleb Sturgis kick no good), WAS 13-6
- PHI - 8:17 Brent Celek 10-yard TD pass from Sam Bradford (Caleb Sturgis kick), Tie 13-13
- WAS - 3:49 Dustin Hopkins 33-yard FG, WAS 16-13

**Fourth quarter**

- PHI - 14:40 Miles Austin 39-yard TD pass from Sam Bradford (Caleb Sturgis kick), PHI 20-16
- WAS - 0:26 Pierre Garçon 4-yard TD pass from Kirk Cousins (Dustin Hopkins kick), WAS 23-20

**Top passers**

- PHI – Sam Bradford: 15/28, 254 yards, 3 TD
- WAS – Kirk Cousins: 31/46, 290 yards, TD

**Top rushers**

- PHI – DeMarco Murray: 8 rushes, 36 yards
- WAS – Alfred Morris: 17 rushes, 62 yards

**Top receivers**

- PHI – Nelson Agholor: 3 receptions, 60 yards
- WAS – Jamison Crowder: 7 receptions, 65 yards

**Top tacklers**

- PHI – Walter Thurmond: 5 tackles, 3 assists
- WAS – Will Compton: 5 tackles, 2 assists

In a heart-pounding NFC East battle, the Redskins scored a last-minute touchdown to end the Eagles' comeback hopes. The Eagles struggled in the first half as the offensive line struggled to protect Sam Bradford and the defense gave up big plays in the first half. And after DeMarco Murray's first run went for 30 yards, he only added 6 yards to it for the rest of the game. The defense would hold the Redskins from a TD on the first 2 drives. Kirk Cousins and the Redskins were able to get the ball moving in the first half. New Eagles kicker Caleb Sturgis, who replaced an injured Cody Parkey, missed a short field goal at the end of the first half and an extra point at the beginning of the second half. The Eagles were able to get the chains moving in the third quarter. Touchdowns by veterans Riley Cooper and Brent Celek gave the Eagles a tie, but Washington took the lead back. At the end of the third quarter, Brandon Graham forced a fumble on Jordan Reed, which was recovered by rookie Jordan Hicks. The Eagles would score on the corresponding drive with a Miles Austin touchdown. However, the Eagles made costly mistakes on 3rd down and had to settle for a punt with 5 minutes left in the game. The Redskins then drove down the field and Pierre Garçon scored the game-winning touchdown. The Eagles attempted to tie or win the game with only 26 seconds left, but the Redskins defense held. The offensive line failed to protect Bradford again and gave up another 2 sacks.

With the loss, the Eagles dropped to 1–3 and last place in the NFC East. However, due to the Cowboys losing and dropping to 2–2, the Eagles were only one game out of 1st place.

==== Week 5: vs. New Orleans Saints ====
Week Five: New Orleans Saints at Philadelphia Eagles – Game summary

Quarter	1	2	3	4	Total
Saints	7	0	3	7	**17**
**Eagles**	0	10	16	13	**39**

at Lincoln Financial Field, Philadelphia, Pennsylvania

- Date: October 11
- Game time: 1:00 pm. EDT
- Game weather: 67 °F (19 °C), clear
- Game attendance: 69,296
- Referee: Ron Torbert
- TV announcers (Fox): Thom Brennaman, Charles Davis and Tony Siragusa
- Recap, Gamebook

Game information

**First quarter**

- NO - 3:35 Benjamin Watson 6-yard TD pass from Drew Brees (Zach Hocker kick), NO 7-0

**Second quarter**

- PHI - 11:43 Josh Huff 41-yard TD pass from Sam Bradford (Caleb Sturgis kick), Tie 7-7
- PHI - 0:10 Caleb Sturgis 29-yard FG, PHI 10-7

**Third quarter**

- NO - 11:12 Zach Hocker 21-yard FG, Tie 10-10
- PHI - 6:44 Ryan Mathews 2-yard TD run (Caleb Sturgis kick), PHI 17-10
- PHI - 6:31 Brent Celek 13-yard TD pass from Sam Bradford (Caleb Sturgis kick no good), PHI 23-10
- PHI - 0:31 Caleb Sturgis 29-yard FG, PHI 26-10

**Fourth quarter**

- PHI - 10:11 Caleb Sturgis 26-yard FG, PHI 29-10
- PHI - 4:19 Caleb Sturgis 41-yard FG, PHI 32-10
- PHI - 3:44 DeMarco Murray 4-yard TD run (Caleb Sturgis kick), PHI 39-10
- NO - 0:00 Brandin Cooks 14-yard TD pass from Drew Brees (Zach Hocker kick), PHI 39-17

**Top passers**

- NO – Drew Brees: 26/43, 336 yards, 2 TD, INT
- PHI – Sam Bradford: 32/45, 333 yards, 2 TD, 2 INT

**Top rushers**

- NO – Mark Ingram II: 12 rushes, 57 yards
- PHI – DeMarco Murray: 20 rushes, 83 yards, TD

**Top receivers**

- NO – Willie Snead: 6 receptions, 142 yards
- PHI – Josh Huff: 4 receptions, 78 yards, TD

**Top tacklers**

- NO – Kenny Vaccaro: 9 tackles, 2 assists
- PHI – Fletcher Cox: 6 tackles, Malcolm Jenkins: 4 tackles, 2 assists

Following the loss, the Eagles bounced back against the 1–3 Saints, who were also last in their division, in their first meeting since their heartbreaking last second loss in the 2013 Wild Card round. After a weak 1st quarter, the Eagles blew out the Saints and successfully got their revenge. In the 2nd quarter Sam Bradford gave second-year receiver Josh Huff his first career receiving touchdown to tie the game. Following this, veteran tight end Brent Celek gained his second receiving touchdown of the year off a 13-yarder.

Murray, Mathews, and Sproles all gained large chunks of yards, but it was Murray who finally had a respectable game, rushing for 83 yards and a touchdown after getting 20 carries, which was more than his entire season total prior to the game.

The Eagles improved to 2–3, while losses from the Cowboys and Redskins put them back in contention for the NFC East crown.

==== Week 6: vs. New York Giants ====
Week Six: New York Giants at Philadelphia Eagles – Game summary

Quarter	1	2	3	4	Total
Giants	7	0	0	0	**7**
**Eagles**	7	10	7	3	**27**

at Lincoln Financial Field, Philadelphia, Pennsylvania

- Date: October 19
- Game time: 8:30 pm. EDT
- Game weather: 44 °F (7 °C), clear
- Game attendance: 69,296
- Referee: Carl Cheffers
- TV announcers (ESPN): Mike Tirico, Jon Gruden and Lisa Salters
- Recap, Gamebook

Game information

**First quarter**

- NYG - 10:23 Odell Beckham Jr. 13-yard TD pass from Eli Manning (Josh Brown kick), NYG 7-0
- PHI - 3:33 Riley Cooper 32-yard TD pass from Sam Bradford (Caleb Sturgis kick), Tie 7-7

**Second quarter**

- PHI - 12:26 Nolan Carroll 17-yard interception return for a TD (Caleb Sturgis kick), PHI 14-7
- PHI - 0:03 Caleb Sturgis 37-yard FG, PHI 17-7

**Third quarter**

- PHI - 6:13 DeMarco Murray 12-yard TD run (Caleb Sturgis kick), PHI 24-7

**Fourth quarter**

- PHI - 8:19 Caleb Sturgis 39-yard FG, PHI 27-7

**Top passers**

- NYG – Eli Manning: 24/38, 189 yards, TD, 2 INT
- PHI – Sam Bradford: 24/38, 280 yards, TD, 3 INT

**Top rushers**

- NYG – Rashad Jennings: 13 rushes, 63 yards
- PHI – DeMarco Murray: 22 rushes, 109 yards, TD

**Top receivers**

- NYG – Odell Beckham Jr.: 7 receptions, 61 yards, TD
- PHI – Riley Cooper: 3 receptions, 76 yards, TD

**Top tacklers**

- NYG – Uani 'Unga: 6 tackles, 1 assist
- PHI – Jordan Hicks: 10 tackles

The Eagles came into the game seeking a win and the lead in the NFC East (the Redskins had lost to the Jets on Sunday). Although both teams committed turnovers, the Eagles came away with the win. Penalties, such as Running into the Kicker and Roughing the Passer, against the Giants gave the Eagles new life on drives that were stopped early and led to points. Although Eli Manning and the Giants' opening drive looked promising, the Giants could not get anything going after that. Bradford threw three interceptions, but DeMarco Murray had his first 100-yard game of the season, and the defense managed to shut down the giants offense.

The Eagles advanced to 3–3 and were tied with the Giants for the lead in the NFC East (the Eagles had the tiebreaker over the Giants due to their head-to-head win)

==== Week 7: at Carolina Panthers ====
Week Seven: Philadelphia Eagles at Carolina Panthers – Game summary

Quarter	1	2	3	4	Total
Eagles	0	6	10	0	**16**
**Panthers**	7	7	7	6	**27**

at Bank of America Stadium, Charlotte, North Carolina

- Date: October 25
- Game time: 8:30 pm. EDT
- Game weather: 71 °F (22 °C), cloudy
- Game attendance: 74,194
- Referee: Craig Wrolstad
- TV announcers (NBC): Al Michaels, Cris Collinsworth and Michele Tafoya
- Recap, Gamebook

Game information

**First quarter**

- CAR - 9:24 Mike Tolbert 2-yard TD run (Graham Gano kick), CAR 7-0

**Second quarter**

- PHI - 5:42 Caleb Sturgis 52-yard FG, CAR 7-3
- CAR - 3:33 Cam Newton 2-yard TD run (Graham Gano kick), CAR 14-3
- PHI - 0:04 Caleb Sturgis 29-yard FG, CAR 14-6

**Third quarter**

- CAR - 11:50 Mike Tolbert 2-yard TD pass from Cam Newton (Graham Gano kick), CAR 21-6
- PHI - 9:32 Ryan Mathews 63-yard TD run (Caleb Strugis kick), CAR 21-13
- PHI - 5:48 Caleb Sturgis 24-yard FG, CAR 21-16

**Fourth quarter**

- CAR - 8:59 Graham Gano 35-yard FG, CAR 24-16
- CAR - 0:18 Graham Gano 29-yard FG, CAR 27-16

**Top passers**

- PHI – Sam Bradford: 26/46, 205 yards, INT
- CAR – Cam Newton: 14/24, 197 yards, TD, 3 INT

**Top rushers**

- PHI – Ryan Mathews: 6 rushes, 97 yards, TD
- CAR – Jonathan Stewart: 24 rushes, 125 yards

**Top receivers**

- PHI – Zach Ertz: 5 receptions, 63 yards
- CAR – Greg Olsen: 3 receptions, 65 yards

**Top tacklers**

- PHI – Nolan Carroll: 6 tackles, 3 assists
- CAR – Thomas Davis: 11 tackles, 2 assists

Sam Bradford has been inconsistent for the previous weeks and this led to rumors about whether or not coach Kelly should bench him. Despite these rumors, the Eagles travel to Charlotte to take on Cam Newton's Carolina Panthers, who had a dominant start to the season. The Eagles were unable to stop the Panthers hot streak as Bradford's struggles continued all game. Jason Peters left the game with a back injury.

With the loss, the Eagles drop to 3–4.

==== Week 9: at Dallas Cowboys ====
Week Nine: Philadelphia Eagles at Dallas Cowboys – Game summary

Quarter	1	2	3	4	OT	Total
**Eagles**	0	7	7	13	6	**33**
Cowboys	7	0	7	13	0	**27**

at AT&T Stadium, Arlington, Texas

- Date: November 8
- Game time: 8:30 pm. EST/7:30 p.m. CST
- Game weather: 60 °F (16 °C), clear – retractable roof open
- Game attendance: 91,827
- Referee: Ed Hochuli
- TV announcers (NBC): Al Michaels, Cris Collinsworth and Michele Tafoya
- Recap, Gamebook

Game information

**First quarter**

- DAL – Cole Beasley 5-yard pass from Matt Cassel (Dan Bailey kick), 6:50. Cowboys 7–0. **Drive: 11 plays, 93 yards, 5:46.**

**Second quarter**

- PHI – DeMarco Murray 1-yard run (Caleb Sturgis kick), 9:06. Tied 7–7. **Drive: 13 plays, 80 yards, 4:17.**

**Third quarter**

- PHI – Ryan Mathews 6-yard run (Caleb Sturgis kick), 8:38. Eagles 14–7. **Drive: 7 plays, 95 yards, 2:39.**
- DAL – Cole Beasley 17-yard pass from Matt Cassel (Dan Bailey kick), 2:11. Tied 14–14. **Drive: 10 plays, 80 yards, 6:32.**

**Fourth quarter**

- PHI – Jordan Hicks 67-yard interception return (Caleb Sturgis kick), 12:59. Eagles 21–14.
- DAL – Dez Bryant 18-yard pass from Matt Cassel (Dan Bailey kick), 11:04. Tied 21–21. **Drive: 3 plays, 24 yards, 1:55.**
- PHI – Caleb Sturgis 31-yard field goal, 7:27. Eagles 24–21. **Drive: 10 plays, 67 yards, 3:30.**
- DAL – Dan Bailey 41-yard field goal, 2:58. Tied 24–24. **Drive: 10 plays, 57 yards, 4:29.**
- PHI – Caleb Sturgis 53-yard field goal, 1:51. Eagles 27–24. **Drive: 6 plays, 45 yards, 1:07.**
- DAL – Dan Bailey 44-yard field goal, 0:07. Tied 27–27. **Drive: 9 plays, 54 yards, 1:44.**

**Overtime**

- PHI – Jordan Matthews 41-yard pass from Sam Bradford, 11:08. Eagles 33–27. **Drive: 9 plays, 80 yards, 4:01.**

**Top passers**

- PHI – Sam Bradford - 25/36, 295 yards, TD
- DAL – Matt Cassel - 25/38, 299 yards, 3 TD, INT

**Top rushers**

- PHI – DeMarco Murray - 18 rushes, 83 yards, TD
- DAL – Darren McFadden - 27 rushes, 117 yards

**Top receivers**

- PHI – Jordan Matthews - 9 receptions, 133 yards, TD
- DAL – Cole Beasley - 9 receptions, 112 yards, 2 TD

**Top tacklers**

- PHI – Malcolm Jenkins: 8 tackles, 1 assist
- DAL – Barry Church: 4 tackles, 4 assists

This was the Eagles' only game outside of the Eastern Time Zone during the 2015 season.

DeMarco Murray returned to Dallas for the first time since leaving the Cowboys.

Hoping to win on his 28th birthday, Sam Bradford accomplished it by throwing the game-winning touchdown pass to Jordan Matthews for 41 yards to give the Eagles the final score in an overtime thriller.

Breakout rookie Jordan Hicks left the game with a torn pectoral muscle. The Eagles later announced that Hicks would miss the rest of the season. Up to this point, Hicks was the Eagles' leading tackler, with 1 sack, 3 fumble recoveries, 1 forced fumble, and 2 interceptions, one of which was a 67-yard pick six that was caught in this game.

With the win, the Eagles tie the season series with Dallas 1–1 and they improved to 4–4.

==== Week 10: vs. Miami Dolphins ====
Week Ten: Miami Dolphins at Philadelphia Eagles – Game summary

Quarter	1	2	3	4	Total
**Dolphins**	3	10	0	7	**20**
Eagles	16	0	0	3	**19**

at Lincoln Financial Field, Philadelphia, Pennsylvania

- Date: November 15
- Game time: 1:00 pm. EST
- Game weather: 59 °F (15 °C), sunny
- Game attendance: 69,596
- Referee: Terry McAulay
- TV announcers (CBS): Kevin Harlan and Rich Gannon
- Recap, Gamebook

Game information

**First quarter**

- MIA - 10:27 Andrew Franks 42-yard FG, MIA 3-0
- PHI - 8:43 Josh Huff 2-yard TD pass from Sam Bradford (Caleb Sturgis kick), PHI 7-3
- PHI - 8:38 SAFETY: Ryan Tannehill fumble, ball out of bounds in end zone, PHI 9-3
- PHI - 4:43 Ryan Mathews 1-yard TD run (Caleb Sturgis kick), PHI 16-3

**Second quarter**

- MIA - 8:18 Andrew Franks 22-yard FG, PHI 16-6
- MIA - 5:52 Lamar Miller 13-yard TD pass from Ryan Tannehill (Andrew Franks kick), PHI 16-13

**Third quarter**

- No scoring plays

**Fourth quarter**

- MIA - 14:55 Jarvis Landry 4-yard TD pass from Ryan Tannehill (Andrew Franks kick), MIA 20-16
- PHI - 10:20 Caleb Sturgis 37-yard FG, PHI 20-19

**Top passers**

- MIA – Ryan Tannehill: 21/36, 217 yards, 2 TD
- PHI – Sam Bradford: 19/25, 236 yards, TD

**Top rushers**

- MIA – Jay Ajayi: 6 carries, 48 yards
- PHI – DeMarco Murray: 22 carries, 61 yards

**Top receivers**

- MIA – Rishard Matthews: 5 receptions, 93 yards
- PHI – Brent Celek: 4 receptions, 134 yards

**Top tacklers**

- MIA – Kelvin Sheppard: 11 tackles, 8 assists
- PHI – Malcolm Jenkins: 10 tackles, 2 assists

The Eagles had a good first quarter and scored 16 unanswered points in the 1st quarter, but were unable to muster any points afterwards. In the third quarter, quarterback Sam Bradford left the game with a concussion along and an injured shoulder, while leading rusher Ryan Mathews left with a concussion as well. Mark Sanchez took over as quarterback for the game's remainder and led the Eagles into field goal range. Sanchez was an improvement over Bradford in some ways, mainly mobility and avoiding sacks, but he was also a less accurate passer. He was intercepted in the end zone while attempting to give the Eagles the lead, on a pass that was wrestled away from wide receiver Miles Austin in the 4th quarter.

==== Week 11: vs. Tampa Bay Buccaneers ====
Week Eleven: Tampa Bay Buccaneers at Philadelphia Eagles – Game summary

Quarter	1	2	3	4	Total
**Buccaneers**	7	21	7	10	**45**
Eagles	7	7	0	3	**17**

at Lincoln Financial Field, Philadelphia, Pennsylvania

- Date: November 22
- Game time: 1:00 pm. EST
- Game weather: 48 °F (9 °C), cloudy
- Game attendance: 69,596
- Referee: Brad Allen
- TV announcers (Fox): Dick Stockton, David Diehl and Kristina Pink
- Recap, Gamebook

Game information

**First quarter**

- PHI – Josh Huff 39-yard pass from Mark Sanchez (Caleb Sturgis kick), 11:44. Eagles 7–0. **Drive: 7 plays, 86 yards, 2:26.**
- TB – Mike Evans 4-yard pass from Jameis Winston (Connor Barth kick), 2:54. Tied 7–7. **Drive: 5 plays, 75 yards, 2:55.**

**Second quarter**

- TB – Vincent Jackson 13-yard pass from Jameis Winston (Connor Barth kick), 15:00. Buccaneers 14–7. **Drive: 5 plays, 59 yards, 2:09.**
- TB – Russell Shepard 4-yard pass from Jameis Winston (Connor Barth kick), 8:10. Buccaneers 21–7. **Drive: 4 plays, 85 yards, 2:03.**
- PHI – Darren Sproles 35-yard pass from Mark Sanchez (Caleb Sturgis kick), 6:12. Buccaneers 21–14. **Drive: 6 plays, 61 yards, 2:02.**
- TB – Charles Sims 14-yard pass from Jameis Winston (Connor Barth kick), 1:11. Buccaneers 28–14. **Drive: 13 plays, 80 yards, 4:59.**

**Third quarter**

- TB – Cameron Brate 8-yard pass from Jameis Winston (Connor Barth kick), 5:16. Buccaneers 35–14. **Drive: 15 plays, 80 yards, 9:47.**

**Fourth quarter**

- TB – Connor Barth 28-yard field goal, 12:05. Buccaneers 38–14. **Drive: 11 plays, 70 yards, 5:11.**
- PHI – Caleb Sturgis 43-yard field goal, 5:14. Buccaneers 38–17. **Drive: 12 plays, 59 yards, 3:57.**
- TB – Lavonte David 20-yard interception return (Connor Barth kick), 4:21. Buccaneers 45–17.

**Top passers**

- TB – Jameis Winston – 19/29, 246 yards, 5 TD
- PHI – Mark Sanchez – 26/41, 261 yards, 2 TD, 3 INT

**Top rushers**

- TB – Doug Martin – 27 rushes, 235 yards
- PHI – DeMarco Murray – 13 rushes, 64 yards

**Top receivers**

- TB – Mike Evans – 4 receptions, 63 yards, TD
- PHI – Brent Celek – 7 receptions, 79 yards

**Top tacklers**

- TB – Kwon Alexander: 10 tackles, 2 assists
- PHI – Fletcher Cox: 7 tackles, 3 assists

Playing in the place of Bradford, Sanchez had an excellent first half, throwing for 2 touchdowns to keep the Eagles in contention, although he threw his first interception shortly before halftime. After halftime, the Eagles offense broke down. The defense, which had already broken down, allowed 5 touchdowns from rookie quarterback Jameis Winston, their once elite run defense let Doug Martin rush for 235 yards, and the Eagles were blown out at home by the Tampa Bay Buccaneers by a score of 45–17 as they fell to 4–6. The 28-point loss was the worst output at home for the Eagles since December 5, 2005 against the Seattle Seahawks, and worst to a sub-.500 opponent.

==== Week 12: at Detroit Lions ====
Thanksgiving Day game

Week Twelve: Philadelphia Eagles at Detroit Lions – Game summary

Quarter	1	2	3	4	Total
Eagles	0	7	0	7	**14**
**Lions**	7	17	14	7	**45**

at Ford Field, Detroit, Michigan

- Date: November 26
- Game time: 12:30 pm. EST
- Game weather: Played indoors (dome stadium)
- Game attendance: 64,445
- Referee: John Parry
- TV announcers (Fox): Joe Buck, Troy Aikman and Erin Andrews
- Recap, Gamebook

Game information

**First quarter**

- DET – Theo Riddick 8-yard pass from Matthew Stafford (Matt Prater kick), 2:14. Lions 7–0. **Drive: 8 plays, 65 yards, 4:27.**

**Second quarter**

- PHI – Brent Celek 2-yard pass from Mark Sanchez (Caleb Sturgis kick), 14:26. Tied 7–7. **Drive: 7 plays, 80 yards, 2:50.**
- DET – Golden Tate 2-yard pass from Matthew Stafford (Matt Prater kick), 7:58. Lions 14–7. **Drive: 12 plays, 80 yards, 6:27.**
- DET – Matt Prater 48-yard field goal, 5:04. Lions 17–7. **Drive: 6 plays, 25 yards, 2:21.**
- DET – Calvin Johnson 25-yard pass from Matthew Stafford (Matt Prater kick), 0:17. Lions 24–7. **Drive: 11 plays, 88 yards, 3:56.**

**Third quarter**

- DET – Calvin Johnson 4-yard pass from Matthew Stafford (Matt Prater kick), 7:13. Lions 31–7. **Drive: 12 plays, 80 yards, 7:51.**
- DET – Calvin Johnson 3-yard pass from Matthew Stafford (Matt Prater kick), 5:10. Lions 38–7. **Drive: 4 plays, 14 yards, 1:28.**

**Fourth quarter**

- DET – Joique Bell 1-yard run (Matt Prater kick), 10:45. Lions 45–7. **Drive: 6 plays, 75 yards, 3:36.**
- PHI – Jordan Matthews 24-yard pass from Mark Sanchez (Caleb Sturgis kick), 3:02. Lions 45–14. **Drive: 9 plays, 55 yards, 3:07.**

**Top passers**

- PHI – Mark Sanchez – 19/27, 199 yards, 2 TD
- DET – Matthew Stafford – 27/38, 337 yards, 5 TD

**Top rushers**

- PHI – Kenjon Barner – 7 rushes, 30 yards
- DET – Ameer Abdullah – 16 rushes, 63 yards

**Top receivers**

- PHI – Jordan Matthews – 3 receptions, 60 yards, TD
- DET – Calvin Johnson – 8 receptions, 93 yards, 3 TD

**Top tacklers**

- PHI – Walter Thurmond III: 6 tackles, 3 assists
- DET – Tahir Whitehead: 4 tackles, 2 assists

Playing in their second straight Thanksgiving game, the Eagles struggled especially on defense, where they were unable to stop the much-hyped Lions offense, led by Matthew Stafford and Calvin Johnson, all game. The worst of it all was how unproven rookie Eric Rowe was tasked with covering wide receiver Calvin Johnson for the majority of the games, leading to Johnson catching 3 touchdowns. Philadelphia's offense was no help, either and frustrations, especially from the team's sideline boiled over. Stafford's five passing touchdowns, including three of them to Johnson was too much for the Eagles to overcome and for the second consecutive time this season, the Eagles gave up 45 points in a game.

With the loss, the Eagles drop to 4–7 on the season and 6–1 when playing on Thanksgiving. However, hope was revived for the team when the Giants, who could have moved to a commanding 3 game lead in the NFC East, fell to the Washington Redskins, meaning the Eagles were only down 1 game from the Giants and Redskins.

==== Week 13: at New England Patriots ====
Week Thirteen: Philadelphia Eagles at New England Patriots – Game summary

Quarter	1	2	3	4	Total
**Eagles**	0	14	14	7	**35**
Patriots	0	14	0	14	**28**

at Gillette Stadium, Foxborough, Massachusetts

- Date: December 6
- Game time: 4:25 pm. EST
- Game weather: 52 °F (11 °C), clear
- Game attendance: 66,829
- Referee: Pete Morelli
- TV announcers (Fox): Thom Brennaman, Charles Davis and Tony Siragusa
- Recap, Gamebook

Game information

**First quarter**

- No scoring plays

**Second quarter**

- NE – James White 4-yard pass from Tom Brady, (Stephen Gostkowski kick), 14:57. Patriots 7–0. **Drive: 10 plays, 80 yards, 3:46.**
- NE – Danny Amendola 11-yard pass from Tom Brady, (Stephen Gostkowski kick), 7:47. Patriots 14–0. **Drive: 8 plays, 80 yards, 4:53.**
- PHI – Zach Ertz 5-yard pass from Sam Bradford, (Caleb Sturgis kick), 4:04. Patriots 14–7. **Drive: 8 plays, 59 yards, 3:43.**
- PHI – Najee Goode 24-yard return of blocked punt (Caleb Sturgis kick), 0:08. Tied 14–14.

**Third quarter**

- PHI – Malcolm Jenkins 100-yard interception return (Caleb Sturgis kick), 7:26. Eagles 21–14.
- PHI – Darren Sproles 83-yard punt return (Caleb Sturgis kick), 4:18. Eagles 28–14.

**Fourth quarter**

- PHI – Jordan Matthews 10-yard pass from Sam Bradford, (Caleb Sturgis kick), 11:09. Eagles 35–14. **Drive: 12 plays, 80 yards, 6:07.**
- NE – Scott Chandler 14-yard pass from Tom Brady, (Stephen Gostkowski kick), 5:27. Eagles 35–21. **Drive: 7 plays, 71 yards, 2:18.**
- NE – Tom Brady 1-yard run (Stephen Gostkowski kick), 3:00. Eagles 35–28. **Drive: 9 plays, 56 yards, 2:27.**

**Top passers**

- PHI – Sam Bradford: 14/24, 120 yards, 2 TD
- NE – Tom Brady: 29/56, 312 yards, 3 TD, 2 INT

**Top rushers**

- PHI – Darren Sproles: 15 rushes, 66 yards
- NE – LeGarrette Blount: 13 rushes, 54 yards

**Top receivers**

- PHI – Jordan Matthews: 3 receptions, 36 yards, TD
- NE – James White: 10 receptions, 115 yards, TD

**Top tacklers**

- PHI – Walter Thurmond: 6 tackles, 4 assists
- NE – Jamie Collins: 3 tackles, 5 assists, 1 sack

In a game that was predicted to be a blowout, with a struggling Eagles defense playing a 10–1 Patriots led by Tom Brady, who led the NFL in passing yards and passing touchdowns. The Eagles held the Patriots to 0 points in the first quarter, but Brady threw a touchdown to James White on the first play of the 2nd quarter, followed by an 11-yard strike to Danny Amendola to make the game 14–0. New England tried an onside kick to surprise Philadelphia, but the special teams were ready and recovered it, giving the Eagles ideal field position. Bradford took advantage of this with a 5-yard touchdown to Zach Ertz next drive, but could not get going following the drive. With 15 seconds left, New England looked poised to end the half with a 7-point lead, but Chris Maragos blocked a punt that middle linebacker Najee Goode took back 24 yards for a touchdown. In the third quarter, Brady drove the ball to the five-yard line, but free safety Malcolm Jenkins had other plans, catching an interception and running it back for a 100-yard pick six. Next drive, New England was forced to punt, which Darren Sproles took back 83 yards for a touchdown. Next drive, Brady threw an end zone pick to cornerback Byron Maxwell, who went down in the end zone for a touchback. In a drive set up by Maxwell's INT that lasted well into the fourth quarter, Bradford threw a TD to Jordan Matthews, and the Eagles were leading 35–14. Enraged fans started to leave the stadium, but soon the lead would thicken as the Patriots scored, recovered an onside kick, and scored again, turning things to make the score 35–28 with 3 minutes left. Riley Cooper batted the next onside kick out of bounds to secure the Eagles possession. After 3rd string running back Kenjon Barner fumbled with slightly over a minute left, Tom Brady and the undermanned Patriots' offense attempted to rally to tie the game, but dropped passes by Martin and Amendola ultimately lead to the underdog Eagles stunning New England and its home crowd.

Although Bradford posted very few yards, he threw 2 touchdowns and continued to not turn the ball over. Outside linebackers Connor Barwin and Brandon Graham scored 2 sacks each. DeMarco Murray returned to his shape from weeks 1–4, rushing for 24 yards on 8 carries, which turns into a pitiful 7 carries for 5 yards when you take away his longest run of 19 yards. Darren Sproles stepped up, rushing for 66 yards, receiving for 34 yards, and returning punts for 115 yards and 1 touchdown.

With the win, the Eagles go to 5–7, ending a three-game skid and passing the Giants for second place in the NFC East. With a loss by the Washington Redskins, the Eagles' 5–7 record tied them with the Redskins for the best record in the NFC East, but their Week 4 loss kept them in second. Not only was this their first win against the Patriots in the Brady-Belichick era (preseason notwithstanding), but two years later, they would proceed to claim their first Super Bowl title in their next game against them.

==== Week 14: vs. Buffalo Bills ====
Week Fourteen: Buffalo Bills at Philadelphia Eagles – Game summary

Quarter	1	2	3	4	Total
Bills	7	3	10	0	**20**
**Eagles**	7	10	3	3	**23**

at Lincoln Financial Field, Philadelphia, Pennsylvania

- Date: December 13
- Game time: 1:00 pm. EST
- Game weather: 66 °F (19 °C), partly cloudy
- Game attendance: 69,596
- Referee: Ed Hochuli
- TV announcers (CBS): Spero Dedes and Solomon Wilcots
- Recap, Gamebook

Game information

**First quarter**

- PHI - 9:53 Darren Sproles 1-yard TD run (Caleb Sturgis kick), PHI 7-0
- BUF - 8:17 Sammy Watkins 47-yard TD pass from Tyrod Taylor (Dan Carpenter kick), Tie 7-7

**Second quarter**

- PHI - 10:38 Nelson Agholor 53-yard TD pass from Sam Bradford (Caleb Sturgis kick), PHI 14-7
- BUF - 6:20 Dan Carpenter 38-yard FG, PHI 14-10
- PHI - 0:05 Caleb Sturgis 45-yard FG, PHI 17-10

**Third quarter**

- PHI - 9:42 Caleb Sturgis 42-yard FG, PHI 20-10
- BUF - 5:14 Dan Carpenter 40-yard FG, PHI 20-13
- BUF - 0:46 Mike Gillislee 19-yard TD run (Dan Carpenter kick), Tie 20-20

**Fourth quarter**

- PHI - 3:26 Caleb Sturgis 30-yard FG, PHI 23-20

**Top passers**

- BUF – Tyrod Taylor: 19-36 268 yards,1 TD, 1 INT
- PHI – Sam Bradford: 23-38, 247 yards, 1 TD, 1 INT

**Top rushers**

- BUF – LeSean McCoy: 20 carries, 74 yards
- PHI – Darren Sproles: 7 carries, 41 yards, TD

**Top receivers**

- BUF – Robert Woods: 5 receptions, 106 yards
- PHI – Zach Ertz: 5 receptions, 98 yards

**Top tacklers**

- BUF – Corey Graham: 8 tackles, 1 assist
- PHI – Fletcher Cox: 7 tackles, 1 assist, 2 tackles for loss, 1 sack

The Eagles host the Buffalo Bills with the return of LeSean McCoy, the Eagles all-time leading rusher who was traded in the offseason. McCoy's started well mentally and physically, as he kissed the Eagles logo and embraced Eagles owner Jeffrey Lurie, as well as racking up 63 yards on 12 carries. After halftime, he started to fall apart. McCoy only rushed for 8 carries and 11 yards in the 2nd half, and after the game, he was not on the field to interact with his former teammates and did not shake hands with coach Kelly, which McCoy said he wouldn't do prior to Week 14.

The game started off well for Philly, besides a first down rush by McCoy, the Buffalo offense was forced to punt after 5 plays, and on the ensuing drive, Darren Sproles rushed for 15 yards to put his team on the 1-yard line, then ran it in for a TD on the next play. The Bills answered with a Tyrod Taylor pass ro Sammy Watkins, a catch and run that went 47 yards for a TD. After several more drives, the Eagles strike again in the second quarter, with first rounder Nelson Agholor getting his first career touchdown on a 53-yard catch and run. The Bills could only muster a Dan Carpenter field goal, which was countered by a Caleb Sturgis field goal with 5 seconds left in the half. The second half started with a Caleb Sturgis field goal, but the Bills scored 10 unanswered points, then intercepted Sam Bradford on the ensuing drive. The score stayed 20–20 until the fourth quarter, where Sturgis kicked another field goal with 3 minutes left. The Bills started to gain some momentum, but a rushed pass led to an interception by backup safety Ed Reynolds clinching the game for the Eagles.

With the win, the Eagles improved to 6–7, but remained in second place in the NFC East due to a win by the Redskins.

==== Week 15: vs. Arizona Cardinals ====
Week Fifteen: Arizona Cardinals at Philadelphia Eagles – Game summary

Quarter	1	2	3	4	Total
**Cardinals**	7	10	13	10	**40**
Eagles	3	7	0	7	**17**

at Lincoln Financial Field, Philadelphia, Pennsylvania

- Date: December 20
- Game time: 8:30 pm. EST
- Game weather: 37 °F (3 °C), partly cloudy
- Game attendance: 69,596
- Referee: Tony Corrente
- TV announcers (NBC): Al Michaels, Cris Collinsworth and Michele Tafoya
- Recap, Gamebook

Game information

**First quarter**

- ARI - David Johnson 1 yard run. (Chandler Catanzaro kick) Drive: 8 plays, 78 yards, 4:16. Cardinals 7–3.
- PHI - Caleb Sturgis 36-yard FG. Drive: 12 plays, 56 yards, 4:44. Cardinals 7–3.

**Second quarter**

- ARI - Chandler Catanzaro 28-yard FG. Drive: 13 plays, 73 yards, 6:52. Cardinals 10–3.
- PHI - Zach Ertz 22 yard pass from Sam Bradford. Drive: 4 plays, 53 yards, 1:55. Tied 10–10.
- ARI - David Johnson 47 yard run. (Chandler Catanzaro kick). Drive: 3 plays, 67 yards, 1:23. Cardinals 17–10.

**Third quarter**

- ARI - David Johnson 1 yard run. Drive: 8 plays, 87 yards, 6:52. Cardinals 23–10.
- ARI - John Brown 16-yard pass from Carson Palmer, (Chandler Catanzaro kick) Drive: 4 plays, 14 yards, 1:28. Cardinals 30–10.

**Fourth quarter**

- ARI - Deone Bucannon 39-yard Interception Return, (Chandler Catanzaro Kick) Drive: 3 plays, 19 yards, 0:50. Cardinals 37–10.
- PHI - Jordan Matthews 78 yard pass from Sam Bradford, (Caleb Sturgis kick). Drive: 1 play, 78 yards, 0:18. Cardinals 37–17.
- ARI - Chandler Catanzaro 38-yard FG. Drive: 10 plays, 49 yards, 5:22. Cardinals 40–17.

**Top passers**

- ARI – Carson Palmer: 20-23, 274 yards, 1 TD
- PHI – Sam Bradford: 28-41, 361 yards, 2 TD, 2 INT

**Top rushers**

- ARI – David Johnson: 29 carries, 187 yards, 3 TD
- PHI – Ryan Mathews: 11 carries, 58 yards

**Top receivers**

- ARI – Michael Floyd: 5 receptions, 70 yards
- PHI – Jordan Matthews: 8 receptions, 159 yards, TD

**Top tacklers**

- ARI – Deone Bucannon- 11 Tackles, 9 Solo
- PHI – Mychal Kendricks- 11 Tackles, 9 Solo

For the second time this season, the Eagles wore their black uniforms as they hosted the Arizona Cardinals, who clinched a playoff spot after a Week 14 victory against Minnesota. The Cardinals didn't let up, as they mercilessly beat the Eagles 40–17. Rookie back David Johnson had a breakout game at an inconvenient time for the Eagles, as he scored 3 touchdowns and over 200 all-purpose yards. A win from the Redskins put the Eagles 2 games down in the East, which they could easily fix by beating the Redskins the following week.

==== Week 16: vs. Washington Redskins ====
Week Sixteen: Washington Redskins at Philadelphia Eagles – Game summary

Quarter	1	2	3	4	Total
**Redskins**	13	3	14	8	**38**
Eagles	7	3	7	7	**24**

at Lincoln Financial Field, Philadelphia, Pennsylvania

- Date: December 26
- Game time: 8:25 pm. EST
- Game weather: 52 °F (11 °C), cloudy
- Game attendance: 69,596
- Referee: Walt Coleman
- TV announcers (NFLN): Ian Eagle, Trent Green and Evan Washburn
- Recap, Gamebook

Game information

**First quarter** **Second quarter** **Third quarter** **Fourth quarter**

**Top passers**

- WAS – Kirk Cousins: 31-46, 365 yards, 4 TD
- PHI – Sam Bradford: 37-56, 380 yards, 1 TD

**Top rushers**

- WAS – Alfred Morris: 17 carries, 49 yards
- PHI – DeMarco Murray: 5 carries, 27 yards, 1 TD

**Top receivers**

- WAS – Jordan Reed: 9 receptions, 129 yards, 2 TD
- PHI – Zach Ertz: 13 receptions, 122 yards

**Top tacklers**

- WAS –
- PHI –

In a do-or-die situation, the Eagles died. With a chance to take control of the NFC East, they let the Washington Redskins run away with the division. After an excellent first drive where Sam Bradford played efficiently and Ryan Mathews sliced through the Redskins defense for a rushing TD, the Eagles failed to get anything going afterward. Although a missed extra point gave the Eagles the lead for most of the first quarter, after a second Cousins-Reed touchdown, they never got the lead back. After an exchange of field goals (1 by Sturgis, 2 by Hopkins) which put the Redskins up by 13, the Eagles struck back with a 4-yard DeMarco Murray touchdown to cut the deficit to 6. However, on the next Eagles drive, turnovers struck. First Darren Sproles muffed and recovered his punt for minimal gain, followed by knocking the ball of Bradford's hands on a play action fake, which was also recovered. But on 3rd down Murray fumbled a pitch which was returned for a touchdown by DeAngelo Hall, putting the Redskins up by 13, which was made even worse with a Pierre Garçon touchdown and a 2-point conversion, putting the Eagles down by 21 with 8 minutes left. The Eagles responded with a 43-yard Jordan Matthews touchdown, then the forced a Redskins punt. The Eagles got to the Redskins 26 again, but with 1:42 left on 3rd and 5, a wide open Kenjon Barner drops a potential touchdown pass, leading to a turnover on downs. Then, Cousins took 2 kneels, and the Redskins won the NFC East. The Eagles fell to 6–9 and out of the playoff picture: The loss also eliminated the Giants from the playoffs as well. Chip Kelly was fired 3 days after the game.

==== Week 17: at New York Giants ====
Week Seventeen: Philadelphia Eagles at New York Giants – Game summary

Quarter	1	2	3	4	Total
**Eagles**	14	7	7	7	**35**
Giants	3	17	7	3	**30**

at MetLife Stadium, East Rutherford, New Jersey

- Date: January 3, 2016
- Game time: 1:00 pm. EST
- Game weather: 45 °F (7 °C), sunny
- Game attendance: 78,023
- Referee: Gene Steratore
- TV announcers (Fox): Kenny Albert, Daryl Johnston and Laura Okmin
- Recap, Gamebook

Game information

**First quarter** **Second quarter** **Third quarter** **Fourth quarter**

**Top passers**

- PHI –
- NYG –

**Top rushers**

- PHI –
- NYG –

**Top receivers**

- PHI –
- NYG –

**Top tacklers**

- PHI –
- NYG –

In their first game without Chip Kelly, who was fired days after last week's loss against Washington, the Eagles still managed to end the season on a high note with a hard-fought 35–30 victory over the Giants, in what was likely to be Tom Coughlin's final game coaching the Giants.

The Eagles went to 7–9, and completed a 2–0 season sweep over the New York Giants.

== Standings ==
=== Division ===
NFC East
	W	L	T	PCT	DIV	CONF	PF	PA	STK
^{(4)} Washington Redskins	9	7	0	.563	4–2	8–4	388	379	W4
Philadelphia Eagles	7	9	0	.438	3–3	4–8	377	430	W1
New York Giants	6	10	0	.375	2–4	4–8	420	442	L3
Dallas Cowboys	4	12	0	.250	3–3	3–9	275	374	L4

=== Conference ===
NFC
#	Team	Division	W	L	T	PCT	DIV	CONF	SOS	SOV	STK
Division Leaders
1	Carolina Panthers	South	15	1	0	.938	5–1	11–1	.441	.438	W1
2	Arizona Cardinals	West	13	3	0	.813	4–2	10–2	.477	.457	L1
3	Minnesota Vikings	North	11	5	0	.688	5–1	8–4	.504	.449	W3
4	Washington Redskins	East	9	7	0	.563	4–2	8–4	.465	.403	W4
Wild Cards
5 (Note: Green Bay finished ahead of Seattle based on head-to-head victory.)	Green Bay Packers	North	10	6	0	.625	3–3	7–5	.531	.450	L2
6	Seattle Seahawks	West	10	6	0	.625	3–3	7–5	.520	.431	W1
Did not qualify for the postseason
7	Atlanta Falcons	South	8	8	0	.500	1–5	5–7	.480	.453	L1
8 (Note: St. Louis and Detroit finished ahead of Philadelphia and New Orleans based on conference record. St. Louis finished ahead of Detroit based on head-to-head victory. Detroit finished ahead of Philadelphia and New Orleans based on head-to-head sweep, while Philadelphia finished ahead of New Orleans based on head-to-head victory.)	St. Louis Rams	West	7	9	0	.438	4–2	6–6	.527	.482	L1
9	Detroit Lions	North	7	9	0	.438	3–3	6–6	.535	.429	W3
10	Philadelphia Eagles	East	7	9	0	.438	3–3	4–8	.508	.473	W1
11	New Orleans Saints	South	7	9	0	.438	3–3	5–7	.504	.402	W2
12 (Note: The New York Giants and Chicago each finished ahead of Tampa Bay based on head-to-head victory, while the Giants finished ahead of Chicago based on conference record.)	New York Giants	East	6	10	0	.375	2–4	4–8	.500	.396	L3
13	Chicago Bears	North	6	10	0	.375	1–5	3–9	.547	.469	L1
14	Tampa Bay Buccaneers	South	6	10	0	.375	3–3	5–7	.484	.406	L4
15	San Francisco 49ers	West	5	11	0	.313	1–5	4–8	.539	.463	W1
16	Dallas Cowboys	East	4	12	0	.250	3–3	3–9	.531	.438	L4
Tiebreakers (Note: When breaking ties for three or more teams under the NFL's rules, they are first broken within divisions, then comparing only the highest-ranked remaining team from each division.)
