= Jordan Hicks (American football) =

American football player (born 1992)

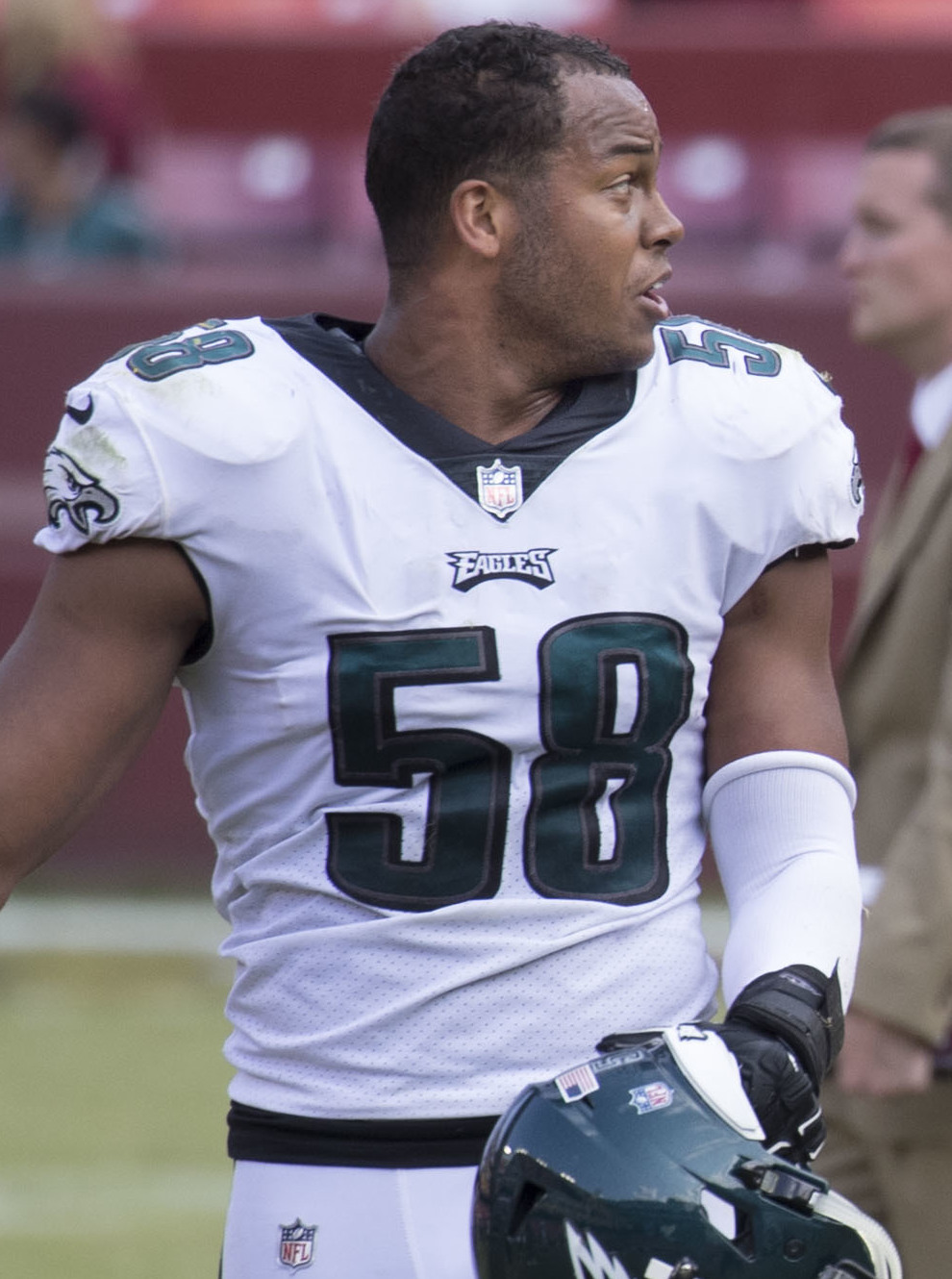
- Hicks with the Philadelphia Eagles in 2017

Houston Texans
- Title: Coaching intern

Personal information
- Born: June 27, 1992 (age 34); Colorado Springs, Colorado, U.S.
- Listed height: 6 ft 1 in (1.85 m)
- Listed weight: 235 lb (107 kg)

Career information
- High school: Lakota West (West Chester, Ohio)
- College: Texas (2010–2014)
- NFL draft: 2015: 3rd round, 84th overall pick

Career history

Playing
- Philadelphia Eagles (2015–2018); Arizona Cardinals (2019–2021); Minnesota Vikings (2022–2023); Cleveland Browns (2024)

Coaching
- Houston Texans Bill Walsh minority coaching fellowship (2026–present)

Awards and highlights
- Super Bowl champion (LII); Second-team All-American (2014); Second-team All-Big 12 (2014)

Career NFL statistics
- Total tackles: 952
- Sacks: 16.5
- Forced fumbles: 6
- Fumble recoveries: 11
- Pass deflections: 53
- Interceptions: 13
- Defensive touchdowns: 2
- Stats at Pro Football Reference

Jordan Hicks (born June 27, 1992) is an American former professional football player who was a linebacker for 10 seasons in the National Football League (NFL). He is currently serving as a coaching intern for the Houston Texans of the National Football League (NFL). He played for the Philadelphia Eagles, with whom he won a Super Bowl ring in 2018, the Arizona Cardinals, Minnesota Vikings, and Cleveland Browns. He played college football for the Texas Longhorns.

== Early life ==
Hicks attended Lakota West High School in West Chester, Ohio, where he started his final three seasons for their football team, posting 216 tackles, 8.5 sacks, 36 tackles for loss, three forced fumbles, four interceptions, 10 pass breakups, and a touchdown. He was a two-time first-team all-state, all-county and all-district selection at linebacker and named an All-American selection by Parade, USA Today, and EA Sports. Hicks won the High School Dick Butkus Award in 2009.

== College career ==
Hicks played college football for the Longhorns at the University of Texas at Austin, from 2010 to 2014 under head coaches Mack Brown and Charlie Strong. He played in every game in his freshman and sophomore seasons and was named honorable mention Big 12 Conference Defensive Freshman of the Year in 2010 and to the 2011 Academic All-Big 12 first team. He started the first three games of his junior season at weakside linebacker, starting the season on the 2012 Lombardi Award watch list, but then missed the remainder of the season due to a hip injury. He earned a medical redshirt to preserve a year of eligibility, and the following season, started the first four games at weakside linebacker before again suffering a season-ending injury, this time a ruptured left Achilles tendon. In 2013, he was on the watch lists for the 2013 Nagurski Trophy and graduated in December after making the Big 12 Commissioner's Honor Roll seven-times. He returned from the injury to start all 13 games in the 2014 season, while working on a master's degree, and earn second team All-America honors from Walter Camp and the FWAA, second team All-Big 12 honors and become a semifinalist for the 2014 Chuck Bednarik Award. He was also on the watch list for the 2014 Butkus Award, made the 2014 first team Academic All-Big 12 team and was named to the 2015 National Football Foundation (NFF) Hampshire Honor Society.

== Professional career ==
=== Pre-draft ===
On December 1, 2014, it was announced that Hicks had accepted his invitation to play in the 2015 Senior Bowl. On January 24, 2015, Hicks played in the Reese's Senior Bowl and recorded five combined tackles to help Tennessee Titans head coach Ken Whisenhunt's North team defeat the South 34–13. He was one of 34 collegiate linebackers to attend the NFL Scouting Combine in Indianapolis, Indiana. Hicks completed all of the combine drills and ran the 11th fastest 40-yard dash among all linebackers. He also finished with the third best vertical jump and broad jump among his position group. On March 24, 2015, Hicks attended Texas' pro day, along with Malcom Brown, Quandre Diggs, Jaxon Shipley, Geoff Swaim, Cedric Reed, Mykkele Thompson, and ten other prospects. He opted to stand on his combine numbers and only perform positional drills for NFL team representatives and scouts from all 32 NFL teams attended. At the conclusion of the pre-draft process, Hicks was projected to be a fourth or fifth round pick by NFL draft experts and scouts. He was ranked the fourth best outside linebacker in the draft by NFL analyst Charles Davis and the ninth best outside linebacker prospect by NFLDraftScout.com.

Pre-draft measurables
Height	Weight	Arm length	Hand span	40-yard dash	10-yard split	20-yard split	20-yard shuttle	Three-cone drill	Vertical jump	Broad jump	Bench press
6 ft 1 3/8 in (1.86 m)	236 lb (107 kg)	32 in (0.81 m)	10 in (0.25 m)	4.68 s	1.58 s	2.67 s	4.15 s	6.78 s	38 in (0.97 m)	10 ft 4 in (3.15 m)	20 reps
All values from NFL Combine

=== Philadelphia Eagles ===
==== 2015 ====
The Philadelphia Eagles selected Hicks in the third round (84th overall) of the 2015 NFL draft. He was the ninth linebacker selected in 2015.

On May 14, 2015, the Eagles signed Hicks to a four-year, $2.99 million contract that included a signing bonus of $652,732.

Throughout his first training camp, he competed against Mychal Kendricks, Kiko Alonso, Demeco Ryans, and Najee Goode for a starting inside linebacker job in defensive coordinator Billy Davis's base 3-4 defense. Head coach Chip Kelly named him the backup inside linebacker behind starters Kendricks and Ryans to begin the regular season.

He made his professional regular season debut in the Eagles' season-opening 26–24 loss at the Atlanta Falcons. The following week, Hicks made seven solo tackles, notched his first career sack, and forced a fumble in a 20–10 loss to the Dallas Cowboys. He made his first career tackle on tight end Jason Witten after Witten caught a five-yard pass from quarterback Tony Romo in the second quarter. He also had the first sack and forced fumble of his career when he sacked Romo for an eight-yard loss in the third quarter and Fletcher Cox recovered the fumble. While sacking Romo, Hicks broke the quarterback's collarbone. He earned more snaps on defense after linebackers Mychal Kendricks suffered a hamstring injury and Kiko Alonso injured his knee in the first half of the game. On September 27, 2015, Hicks earned his first career start due to injuries to Kendricks and Alonso. He recorded a season-high ten combined tackles, deflected a pass, recovered a fumble, and made his first career interception off a pass attempt by Ryan Fitzpatrick during the Eagles' 24–17 victory at the New York Jets.

In Week 6, Hicks made his third career start in place of Mychal Kendricks and collected a season-high ten solo tackles in a 27–7 victory over the New York Giants. On November 8, 2015, he made seven combined tackles, deflected a pass, collected an interception, and scored his first career touchdown during a 33–27 overtime victory at the Dallas Cowboys. He scored his first career touchdown after intercepting quarterback Matt Cassel and returning it 67 yards in the fourth quarter. Unfortunately, he left the game in the fourth quarter after suffering an apparent pectoral injury. On November 9, 2015, the Eagles placed Hicks on injured reserve after it was discovered he suffered a torn pectoral. At the time of the injury, Hicks led the team in tackles. Hicks finished his rookie season with 50 combined tackles (43 solo), three pass deflections, two interceptions, a sack, and a touchdown in eight games and five starts. The Eagles finished the season 7–9, and head coach Chip Kelly was fired after Week 16.

==== 2016 ====
Hicks entered training camp slated as the starting middle linebacker, but saw competition from veteran Stephen Tulloch. The Eagles opted to change to a base 4-3 defense and had Hicks take over middle linebacker after DeMeco Ryans retired. Head coach Doug Pederson named Hicks the starting middle linebacker to begin the regular season.

Hicks started the Eagles' season-opener against the Cleveland Browns and recorded four solo tackles and deflected a pass in their 29–10 victory. On October 23, 2016, he collected a season-high 11 combined tackles, defended two passes, and sacked Minnesota Vikings quarterback Sam Bradford in the Eagles' 21–10 victory. The following week, Hicks made six combined tackles, deflected a pass, and made his first interception of the season on a pass attempt by Cowboys' quarterback Dak Prescott during a 29–23 loss. In Week 9, he collected seven combined tackles, two pass deflections, and intercepted Giants' quarterback Eli Manning to set up a potential game-winning touchdown in their 28–23 loss. On January 1, 2017, Hicks made five solo tackles, deflected two passes, and had his first multi-interception game after picking off Mark Sanchez two times during a 27–13 win over the Cowboys. He finished the season with 85 combined tackles (58 solo), 11 pass deflections, five interceptions, and one sack in 16 games and 16 starts.

==== 2017 ====
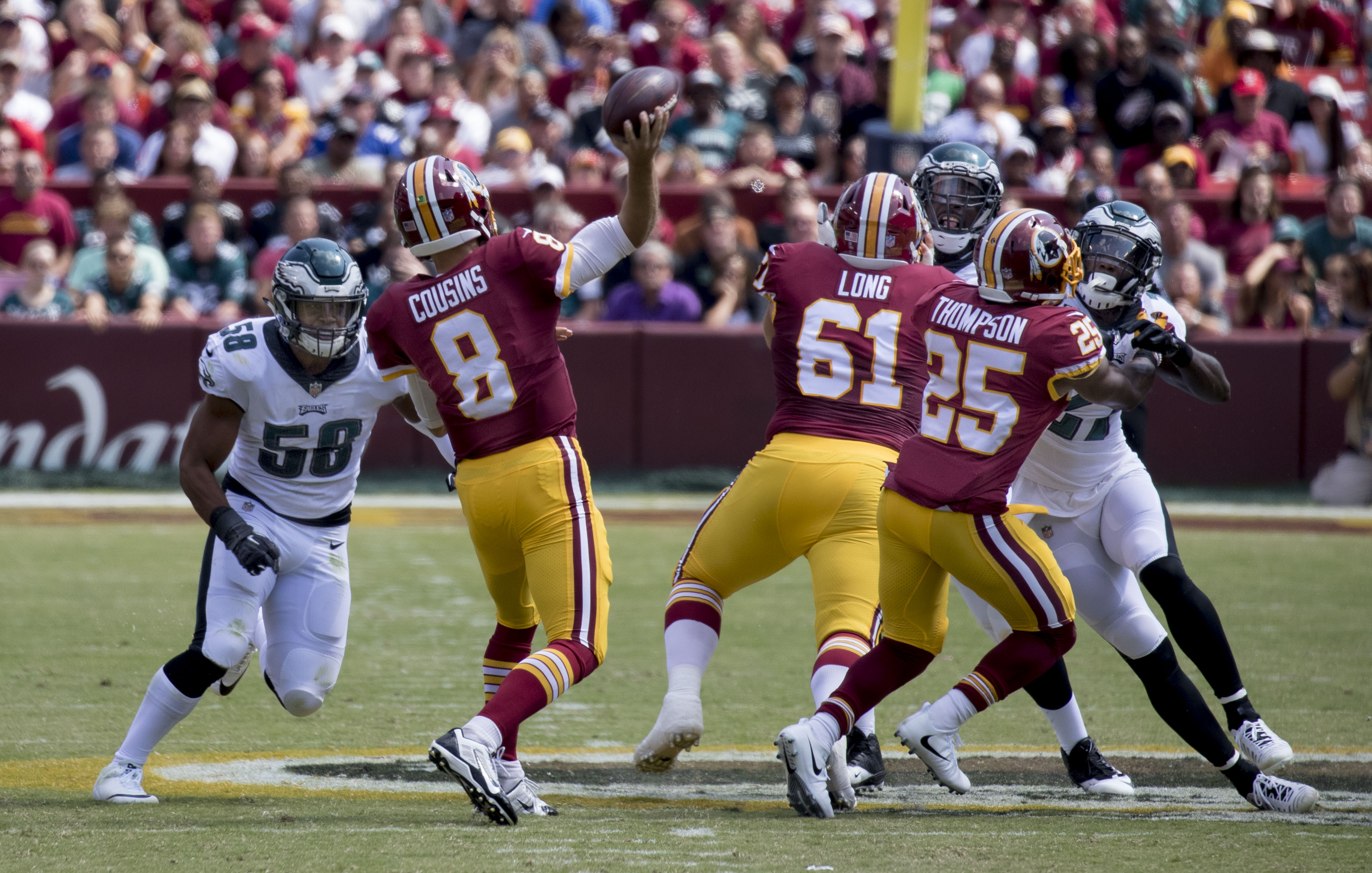
Hicks (left) playing against the Washington Redskins in 2017.

Hicks entered his second season under defensive coordinator Jim Schwartz as the returning starting middle linebacker after his stellar season in 2016.

He started the Eagles' season-opener against the Washington Redskins and recorded seven combined tackles and recovered a fumble from quarterback Kirk Cousins during a 30–17 victory. On October 1, 2017, he collected a season-high seven combined tackles during the Eagles' 26–24 win at the Los Angeles Chargers. During a Week 7 matchup against the Redskins, Hicks suffered a season-ending achilles injury and was placed on injured reserve on October 31, 2017. Without Hicks, the Eagles won 13 games and reached Super Bowl LII where they defeated the Patriots 41–33.

==== 2018 ====
Hicks made his return from injury in week 1 against the Falcons. In the game, Hicks recorded a team high 7 tackles and sacked Matt Ryan 1.5 times during the 18–12 win. In week 2 against the Tampa Bay Buccaneers, Hicks recorded a team high 9 tackles and recovered a fumble forced by teammate Malcolm Jenkins on wide receiver Mike Evans and returned it 13 yards during the 27–21 loss. In week 8 against the Jacksonville Jaguars, Hicks recorded a season-high 13 tackles and sacked Blake Bortles 1.5 times during the 24–18 win. In week 11 against the New Orleans Saints, Hicks recorded 7 tackles before straining his calf in the fourth quarter of the 48–7 loss. Hicks made his return from the calf strain in week 16 against the Houston Texans. In the game, Hicks recorded 5 tackles during the 32–30 win. Hicks finished the season with 91 tackles (61 solo), three sacks, one fumble recovery, and five pass deflections in 12 games started.

Hicks made his playoff debut in the Wild Card Round against the Chicago Bears. In the game, Hicks recorded 3 tackles in the 16–15 win which became known as Double Doink. In the Divisional Round of the playoffs against the New Orleans Saints, Hicks recorded 9 tackles during the 20–14 loss.

=== Arizona Cardinals ===
==== 2019 ====
On March 15, 2019, Hicks signed with the Arizona Cardinals on a four-year, $36 million contract, with $20 million guaranteed and a $12 million signing bonus. Hicks made his debut with the Cardinals in week 1 of the season against the Detroit Lions. In the game, Hicks recorded a season-high 14 tackles during the 27–27 tie game. In week 7 against the Giants, Hicks recorded his first interception of the season off a pass thrown by Daniel Jones in the 27–21 win. In week 10 against the Buccaneers, Hicks recorded a team high 9 tackles and intercepted a pass thrown by Jameis Winston during the 30–27 loss. In week 11 against the San Francisco 49ers, Hicks recorded 12 tackles, his first sack of the season on Jimmy Garoppolo, and intercepted a pass thrown by Garoppolo during the 36–26 loss. In week 16 against the Seattle Seahawks, Hicks recorded 6 tackles and recovered a fumble forced by teammate Chandler Jones on wide receiver David Moore during the 27–13 win. Hicks finished the season with 150 tackles (93 solo), 1.5 sacks, two forced fumbles, one fumble recovery, six pass deflections, and three interceptions in 16 games started.

==== 2020 ====
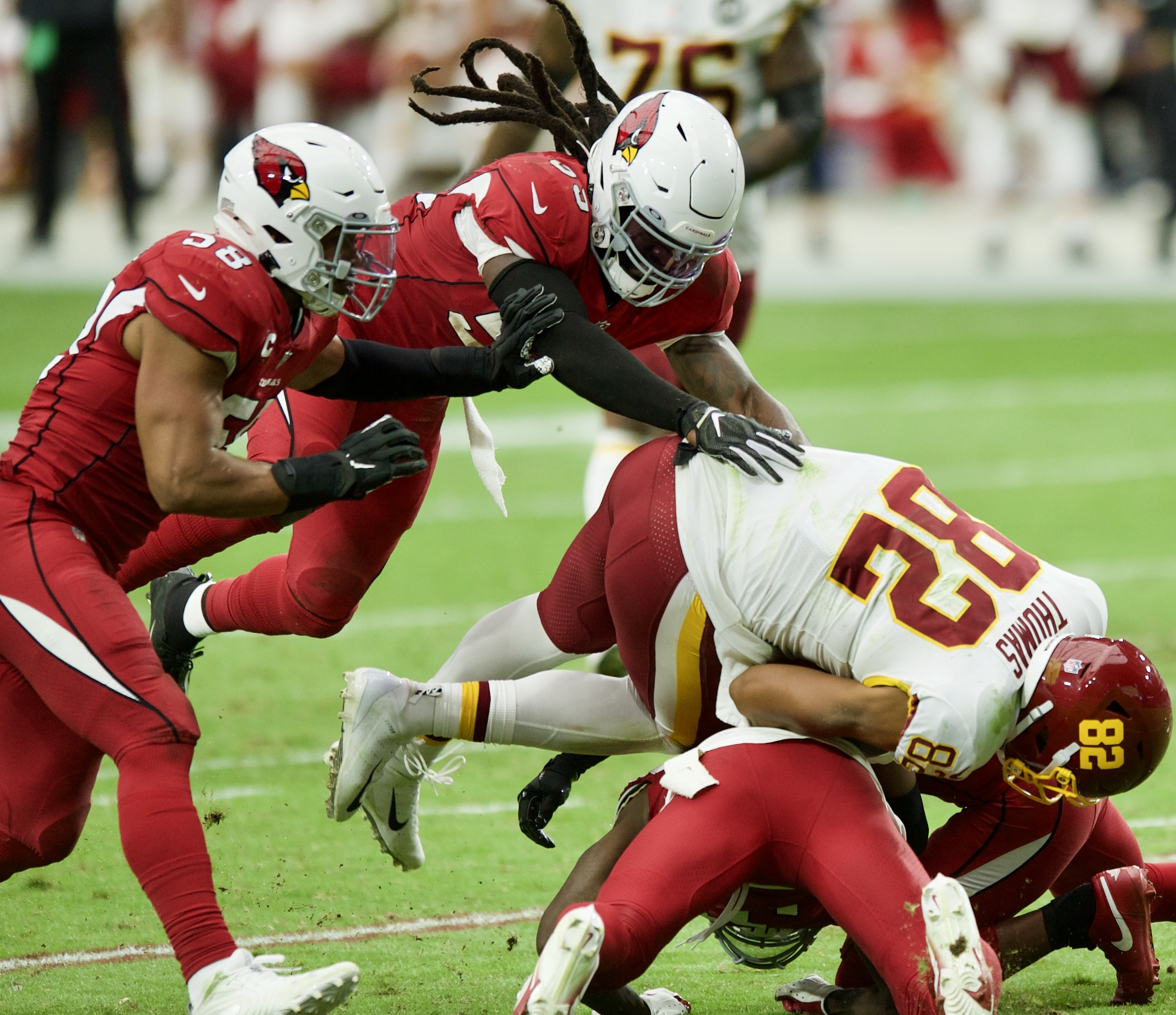
Hicks (left) playing for the Cardinals in 2020.

In Week 17 of the 2020 season against the Los Angeles Rams, Hicks recorded his first and only interception of the season off a pass thrown by John Wolford during the 18–7 loss.

==== 2021 ====
In Week 13, Hicks had 13 tackles, two sacks and two tackles for loss in a 33–22 win over the Chicago Bears, earning NFC Defensive Player of the Week. He started all 17 games, leading the defense in snaps, finishing second on the team with 116 tackles, four sacks, five passes defensed, and a forced fumble.

On March 9, 2022, Hicks was released by the Cardinals.

=== Minnesota Vikings ===
On March 15, 2022, Hicks signed a two-year contract with the Vikings. He started all 17 games for the division-champion Vikings, and recorded the 2nd most tackles and passes deflected on the team.

On March 13, 2023, Hicks agreed to a restructured contract with the Vikings. In Week 6, Hicks recorded 10 tackles, an interception, and a 42-yard fumble return for a touchdown in a 19–13 win over the Bears, earning NFC Defensive Player of the Week.

On November 12, 2023, Hicks suffered a leg contusion during the game against the Saints. He tried to return to action but was removed from the game. After the game, swelling led to the Vikings and Hicks seeking expanded medical care. He was transported to a hospital and underwent a procedure to address compartment syndrome. The Vikings placed him on injured reserve list two days later. He was activated on December 23.

=== Cleveland Browns ===
On March 13, 2024, Hicks signed a two-year contract with the Cleveland Browns. In the 2024 season he played in 12 games for the Browns recording 4 deflected passes, 4 tackles for loss, 5 QB hits and 78 tackles; which is the fewest tackles in a season for him since 2017. He missed several games in the middle of the season with injuries to his elbow/triceps and the last game of the season with a concussion.

=== Retirement ===
On July 25, 2025, Hicks announced his retirement from the NFL.

== Career statistics ==
=== NFL ===
Legend
**Bold**	Career high

==== Regular season ====
Year	Team	Games		Tackles				Fumbles				Interceptions					
Year	Team	GP	GS	Cmb	Solo	Ast	Sck	FF	FR	Yds	TD	Int	Yds	Avg	Lng	TD	PD
2015	PHI	8	5	50	43	7	1.0	1	**3**	11	0	2	**67**	**33.5**	**67**	**1**	3
2016	PHI	16	16	85	58	27	1.0	0	1	0	0	**5**	41	8.2	34	0	**11**
2017	PHI	7	7	28	19	9	0.0	0	1	0	0	0	0	0.0	0	0	0
2018	PHI	12	12	91	61	30	3.0	0	1	13	0	0	0	0.0	0	0	5
2019	ARI	16	16	**150**	**93**	**57**	1.5	**2**	1	0	0	3	64	21.3	48	0	6
2020	ARI	16	16	118	78	40	0.0	0	0	0	0	1	6	6.0	6	0	4
2021	ARI	**17**	**17**	116	75	41	**4.0**	1	0	0	0	0	0	0.0	0	0	5
2022	MIN	**17**	**17**	129	86	43	3.0	1	0	0	0	1	19	19.0	0	0	10
2023	MIN	13	13	107	61	46	1.0	1	2	**42**	**1**	1	9	9.0	9	0	5
2024	CLE	12	12	78	40	38	2.0	0	0	0	0	0	0	0	0	0	4
Career		134	131	952	614	338	16.5	6	11	66	1	13	206	15.8	67	1	51

==== Postseason ====
Year	Team	Games		Tackles				Fumbles				Interceptions					
Year	Team	GP	GS	Cmb	Solo	Ast	Sck	FF	FR	Yds	TD	Int	Yds	Avg	Lng	TD	PD
2018	PHI	**2**	**1**	**12**	**9**	3	0.0	0	0	0	0	0	0	0.0	0	0	0
2021	ARI	1	1	8	2	**6**	0	0	0	0	0	0	0	0.0	0	0	0
2022	MIN	1	1	8	6	2	0	0	0	0	0	0	0	0.0	0	0	0
Career		4	3	28	17	11	0.0	0	0	0	0	0	0	0.0	0	0	0

=== College ===
Year	Team	Class	Pos	GP	Tackles					Interceptions					Fumbles			
Year	Team	Class	Pos	GP	Cmb	Solo	Ast	TfL	Sck	Int	Yds	Avg	TD	PD	FF	FR	Yds	TD
2010	Texas	FR	LB	12	21	9	12	1.0	1.0	0	0	0.0	0	0	0	0	0	0
2011	Texas	SO	LB	13	50	30	20	3.5	1.0	0	0	0.0	0	3	0	1	0	0
2012	Texas	JR	LB	3	18	10	8	2.5	0.0	0	0	0.0	0	1	0	0	0	0
2013	Texas	(redshirt) JR	LB	4	43	26	17	2.5	0.0	0	0	0.0	0	0	0	0	0	0
2014	Texas	(redshirt) SR	LB	13	116	60	56	13.0	3.5	2	19	9.5	0	2	0	0	0	0
Career				45	248	135	113	22.5	5.5	2	19	9.5	0	6	0	1	0	0

== Personal life ==
Hicks is married to Ivana Hicks. They have three children.
