= Eric Rowe =

American football player (born 1992)

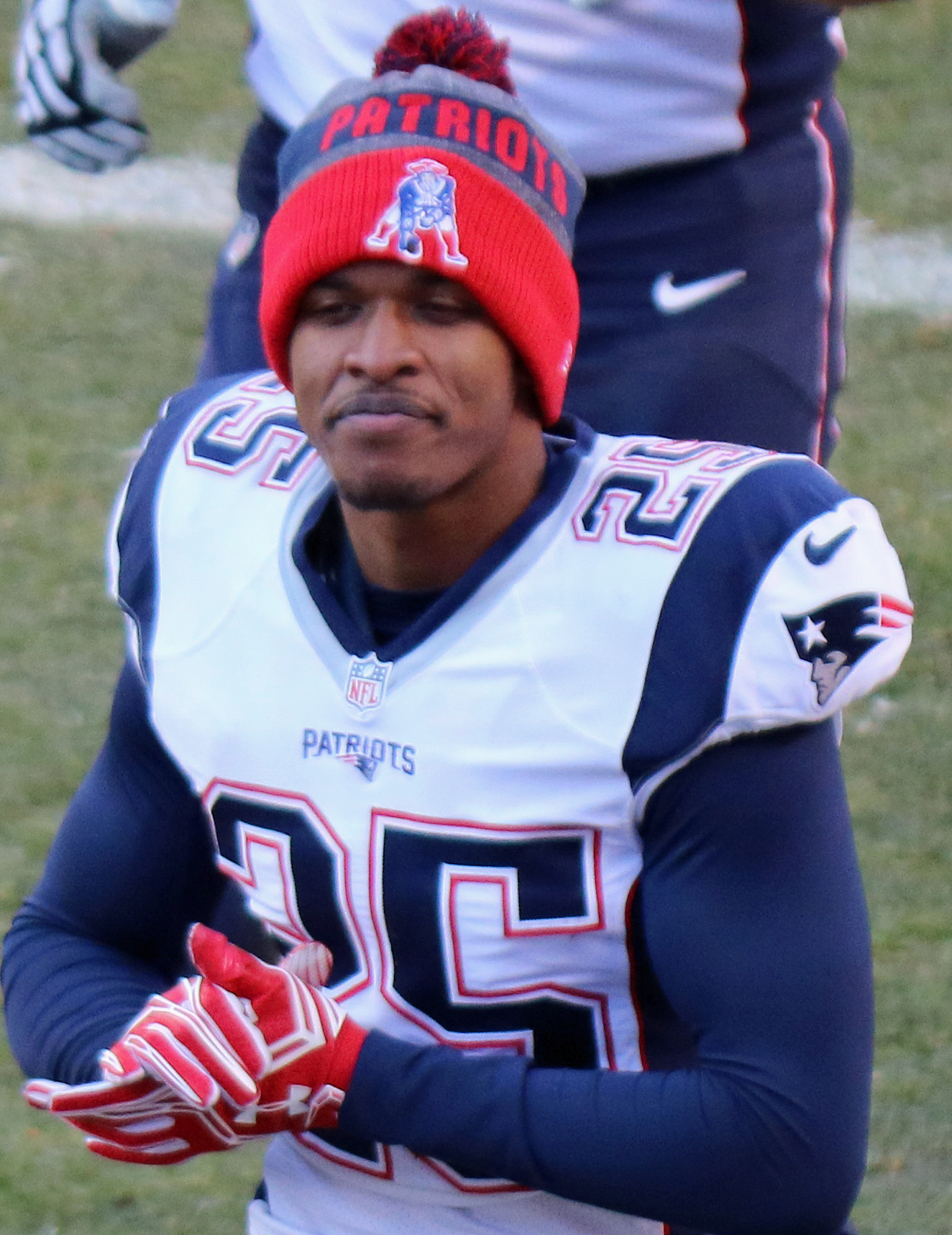
- Rowe with the New England Patriots in 2016

Profile
- Position: Safety

Personal information
- Born: October 3, 1992 (age 34); Cleveland, Ohio, U.S.
- Listed height: 6 ft 1 in (1.85 m)
- Listed weight: 210 lb (95 kg)

Career information
- High school: Klein (Klein, Texas)
- College: Utah
- NFL draft: 2015: 2nd round, 47th overall pick

Career history
- Philadelphia Eagles (2015); New England Patriots (2016–2018); Miami Dolphins (2019–2022); Carolina Panthers (2023)*; Pittsburgh Steelers (2023–2024)
- * Offseason or practice squad member only

Awards and highlights
- 2× Super Bowl champion (LI, LIII)

Career NFL statistics as of 2024
- Total tackles: 410
- Forced fumbles: 7
- Fumble recoveries: 1
- Pass deflections: 43
- Interceptions: 6
- Defensive touchdowns: 1
- Stats at Pro Football Reference

Nelson Eric Rowe Jr. (born October 3, 1992) is an American former professional football player who was a safety in the National Football League (NFL). He played college football for the Utah Utes, and has played in the NFL for the Philadelphia Eagles, New England Patriots, and Miami Dolphins.

== Early life ==
Rowe attended Doerre Intermediate in Spring, Texas, and Klein High School in Klein, Texas. During his high school football career, he had 207 tackles and nine interceptions. He was rated by Rivals.com as a three-star recruit and was ranked as the 39th best safety in his class. He committed to the University of Utah to play college football. Rowe also played basketball and ran track in high school.

== College career ==
Rowe attended Utah from 2011 to 2014. He became a starter at safety his freshman year. He started all 13 games, recording 69 tackles, an interception and a sack. As a sophomore, Rowe started 10 games, missing two due to injury. He had 64 tackles and one interception. As a junior, he again started all 12 games, finishing with 69 tackles and a half a sack. Prior to his senior season, Rowe was moved from safety to cornerback. He started 10 of 12 games and had 59 tackles and one interception. For his career, Rowe started 45 of 47 games and had 261 tackles, three interceptions and 1.5 sacks.

== Professional career ==
External videos
- Eric Rowe's NFL Combine Workout

Pre-draft measurables
Height	Weight	Arm length	Hand span	40-yard dash	10-yard split	20-yard split	20-yard shuttle	Three-cone drill	Vertical jump	Broad jump	Bench press
6 ft 0 3/4 in (1.85 m)	205 lb (93 kg)	31 1/2 in (0.80 m)	9 1/2 in (0.24 m)	4.45 s	1.56 s	2.61 s	3.97 s	6.70 s	39 in (0.99 m)	10 ft 5 in (3.18 m)	19 reps
All values from NFL Combine

=== Philadelphia Eagles ===
External videos
- Eagles draft Eric Rowe 47th overall
- NFL Draft Profile: Eric Rowe

==== 2015 ====
The Philadelphia Eagles selected Rowe in the second round (47th overall) of the 2015 NFL draft. Rowe was the sixth cornerback drafted in 2015. The Eagles traded their second round (52nd overall) and two fifth round picks (145th and 156th overall) to the Miami Dolphins in order to receive the Dolphins' second round pick (47th overall), that was used to draft Rowe, and sixth round pick (191st overall). On May 6, 2015, the Eagles signed Rowe to a four-year, $4.87 million contract that included a signing bonus of $452,248.

Throughout training camp, Rowe competed to be a starting cornerback against Nolan Carroll. Head coach Chip Kelly named Rowe the third cornerback on the Eagles' depth chart to begin the regular season, behind Byron Maxwell and Nolan Carroll.

He made his professional regular season debut in the Eagles' season-opening 26–24 loss at the Atlanta Falcons. On September 27, 2015, Rowe recorded two combined tackles, broke up two passes, and made his first career interception off a pass attempt by Jets' quarterback Geno Smith during a 24–17 win at the New York Jets in Week 3. The following week, he collected a season-high six combined tackles and deflected a pass in the Eagles' 23–20 loss at the Washington Redskins in Week 4. On December 6, 2015, Rowe earned his first career start in place of Nolan Carroll who was inactive after breaking his ankle the previous week. He finished the Eagles' 35–28 win at the New England Patriots in Week 13 with three solo tackles. On December 29, 2015, the Eagles fired head coach Chip Kelly after they fell to a 6–9 record. He finished his rookie season in 2015 with 31 combined tackles (24 solo), five pass deflections, and an interception in 16 games and five starts.

==== 2016 ====
On January 18, 2016, the Eagles hired Kansas City Chiefs offensive coordinator Doug Pederson as their new head coach. During training camp, Rowe competed to be a starting cornerback against Nolan Carroll, Leodis McKelvin, Jalen Mills, and Ron Brooks.

=== New England Patriots ===
==== 2016 ====
On September 7, 2016, the Eagles traded Rowe to the New England Patriots in exchange for a conditional fourth-round (131st overall) draft pick in the 2018 NFL draft. Head coach Bill Belichick named Rowe the fifth cornerback on the depth chart, behind Logan Ryan, Malcolm Butler, Justin Coleman, and Cyrus Jones.

Rowe was inactive for the first five games (Weeks 1–5) due to an ankle injury. In Week 7, he earned his first start as a member of the Patriots and recorded a season-high six combined tackles and broke up a pass during a 27–16 win at the Pittsburgh Steelers. He was inactive as a healthy scratch for the Patriots' Week 10 loss against the Seattle Seahawks. Rowe was sidelined during a Week 14 win against the Baltimore Ravens due to a hamstring injury. He finished the 2016 NFL season with 26 combined tackles (20 solo), eight pass deflections, and an interception in nine games and seven starts.

The New England Patriots finished the 2016 season first in the AFC East with a 14–2 record and earned a first round bye. On January 14, 2017, Rowe appeared in his first career playoff game and recorded three solo tackles during a 34–16 win against the Houston Texans in the AFC Divisional Round. The following week, the Patriots defeated the Steelers 36–17 in the AFC Championship Game. Rowe finished the game with four combined tackles, two pass deflections, and made one interception. On February 5, 2017, Rowe appeared in Super Bowl LI with the New England Patriots and recorded four combined tackles and one pass deflection as the Patriots defeated the Falcons 34–28 in overtime. The game featured the largest comeback in Super Bowl history as the Patriots trailed the Falcons by 25 points in the third quarter.

==== 2017 ====
Throughout training camp, Rowe competed to be the first-team nickelback against Justin Coleman and Cyrus Jones. Head coach Bill Belichick named Rowe the third cornerback on the Patriots' depth chart to start the regular season, behind Stephon Gilmore and Malcolm Butler.

He was sidelined for the Patriots' Week 3 victory against the Texans due to a groin injury. Rowe further aggravated his groin injury and was inactive for seven games (Weeks 5–12). In Week 15, Rowe collected a season-high five solo tackles and broke up a pass in the Patriots' 27–24 win at the Steelers. Due to injuries, Rowe was limited to only eight games and three starts in 2017 and only recorded 15 combined tackles (14 solo) and two pass deflections.

The Patriots finished atop the AFC East with a 13–3 record in 2017, which earned them a first round bye and home-field advantage throughout the playoffs. On January 13, 2018, Rowe started his first career playoff game and made five combined tackles as the Patriots defeated the Tennessee Titans 35–14 in the AFC Divisional Round. The following week, he made four combined tackles and broke up a pass in a 24–20 win against the Jacksonville Jaguars in the AFC Championship Game. On February 4, 2018, Rowe started in Super Bowl LII in place of Malcolm Butler. The coaching decision was heavily criticized among media and NFL analysts as Butler started throughout the entire season and was a key player in their Super Bowl XLIX and LI victories. Rowe recorded four solo tackles and broke up two passes as the Patriots lost 41–33 to Rowe's former team, the Eagles. An Eagles' coaching assistant stated that the Eagles' offense were planning on targeting Rowe prior to the game and Butler’s absence made that easier. The Eagles were planning to exploit a mismatch and predicted Rowe would have difficulty covering wide receiver Alshon Jeffery. Rowe allowed four receptions on nine targets for a team-high 80-yards and one touchdown in Super Bowl LII, including the opening touchdown to Jeffery.

==== 2018 ====
Throughout training camp, Rowe competed to be a starting cornerback against Jason McCourty. Head coach Bill Belichick named Rowe and Stephon Gilmore the starting cornerbacks in 2018. On September 16, 2018, Rowe recorded three solo tackles before being benched in the first quarter of the Patriots' 31–20 loss at the Jaguars. Rowe was benched in favor of Jason McCourty after giving up three receptions for 20 yards and a touchdown. He was inactive for the next three games (Weeks 3–5) due to a groin injury. He played in the next two games before being placed on injured reserve on October 31, 2018, with the groin injury. Without Rowe, the Patriots reached Super Bowl LIII where they beat the Los Angeles Rams 13–3.

=== Miami Dolphins ===
==== 2019 ====
On March 14, 2019, the Miami Dolphins signed Rowe to a one-year, $3.50 million contract that includes a signing bonus of $500,000. As a result, Rowe was reunited with new Dolphins’ head coach Brian Flores, who had previously been a linebackers coach with the Patriots. In Week 7, Rowe began playing strong safety due to calf injury to Reshad Jones.

On December 2, 2019, the Miami Dolphins signed Rowe to a three-year, $16.15 million contract extension season to remain with them throughout the 2022 NFL season. The contract includes $6.57 million guaranteed and a signing bonus of $2.10 million. In week 17 against the New England Patriots, Rowe intercepted a pass thrown by former teammate Tom Brady and returned it for a 35-yard pick six during the 27–24 win.

In the 2019 season, Rowe finished with 81 total tackles (54 solo), one interception, and eight passes defended.

==== 2020 ====
In Week 8 against the Los Angeles Rams, Rowe recorded his first interception of the season off a pass thrown by Jared Goff during the 28–17 win. He finished the 2020 season with 91 total tackles (66 solo), two interceptions, 11 passes defended, and one fumble recovery.

==== 2021 ====
In the 2021 season, Rowe finished with 71 total tackles (43 solo) and four passes defended.

==== 2022 ====
In the 2022 season, Rowe finished with two sacks, 56 total tackles (42 solo), and two passes defended.

=== Carolina Panthers ===
On April 6, 2023, Rowe signed with the Carolina Panthers. On August 29, 2023, he was waived for final roster cuts, but signed to the Panthers' practice squad the following day. He was released on September 19.

=== Pittsburgh Steelers ===
On November 20, 2023, the Pittsburgh Steelers signed Rowe to their practice squad. He appeared in three games for the Steelers in the 2023 season. He was not signed to a reserve/future contract after the season and thus became a free agent when his practice squad contract expired.

On November 19, 2024, Rowe signed with the Steelers practice squad.

== NFL career statistics ==
Legend
**Bold**	Career high

=== Regular season ===
Year	Team	Games		Tackles					Interceptions					Fumbles			
Year	Team	GP	GS	Cmb	Solo	Ast	Sck	TFL	Int	Yds	TD	Lng	PD	FF	FR	Yds	TD
2015	PHI	16	5	31	24	7	0.0	0	1	0	0	0	5	0	0	0	0
2016	NE	9	7	26	20	6	0.0	0	1	0	0	0	8	0	0	0	0
2017	NE	8	3	15	14	1	0.0	1	0	0	0	0	2	0	0	0	0
2018	NE	4	2	10	9	1	0.0	0	0	0	0	0	1	0	0	0	0
2019	MIA	16	**15**	81	54	27	0.0	1	1	**35**	**1**	**35**	8	1	0	0	0
2020	MIA	16	14	**91**	**66**	25	0.0	1	**2**	26	0	22	**11**	0	**1**	0	0
2021	MIA	**17**	4	71	43	**28**	0.0	0	0	0	0	0	4	**3**	0	0	0
2022	MIA	14	6	56	42	14	**2.0**	**4**	0	0	0	0	2	2	0	0	0
2023	PIT	3	3	29	22	7	0.0	1	1	25	0	25	2	1	0	0	0
Career		103	59	410	294	116	2.0	8	6	86	1	35	43	7	1	0	0

=== Playoffs ===
Year	Team	Games		Tackles					Interceptions					Fumbles			
Year	Team	GP	GS	Cmb	Solo	Ast	Sck	TFL	Int	Yds	TD	Lng	PD	FF	FR	Yds	TD
2016	NE	**3**	0	11	9	**2**	0.0	0	**1**	**37**	0	**37**	**3**	0	0	0	0
2017	NE	**3**	**2**	**13**	**11**	**2**	0.0	0	0	0	0	0	**3**	0	0	0	0
2022	MIA	1	1	7	5	**2**	**1.0**	**1**	0	0	0	0	0	**1**	0	0	0
2023	PIT	1	1	8	6	**2**	0.0	0	0	0	0	0	1	0	0	0	0
Career		8	4	39	31	8	1.0	1	1	37	0	37	7	1	0	0	0
