= Mike Lee (American football) =

American football player (born 1997)

Profile
- Position: Cornerback

Personal information
- Born: June 26, 1997 (age 29); New Orleans, Louisiana
- Listed height: 6 ft 1 in (1.85 m)
- Listed weight: 185 lb (84 kg)

Career information
- High school
- College: UMass; Fort Valley State
- NFL draft: 2015: undrafted

Career history
- Atlanta Falcons (2015)*; Philadelphia Eagles (2015)*; San Diego / Los Angeles Chargers (2016–2017)*
- * Offseason or practice squad member only

Mike Lee (born June 26, 1997) is an American former professional football cornerback. He played college football at University of Massachusetts before transferring to Fort Valley State University, where he recorded 41 tackles (24 solo), three interceptions, and eight passes defensed during his senior season with the Wildcats. He was signed by the Atlanta Falcons as an undrafted free agent in 2015.

== Professional career ==
=== Atlanta Falcons ===
Lee signed with the Atlanta Falcons as an undrafted free agent on May 10, 2015. He was waived by the Falcons on August 30, 2015.

=== Philadelphia Eagles ===
On November 30, 2015, Lee was signed to the Philadelphia Eagles' practice squad. He was released by the Eagles on December 15, 2015 but was re-signed the following day.

=== San Diego / Los Angeles Chargers ===
On August 22, 2016, Lee signed with the San Diego Chargers. He was waived by the Chargers on August 29, 2016. He was re-signed to the practice squad on November 9, 2016. He signed a reserve/future contract with the Chargers on January 3, 2017. He was waived by the Chargers on June 2, 2017.
