= Malcolm Bunche =

American football player (born 1991)

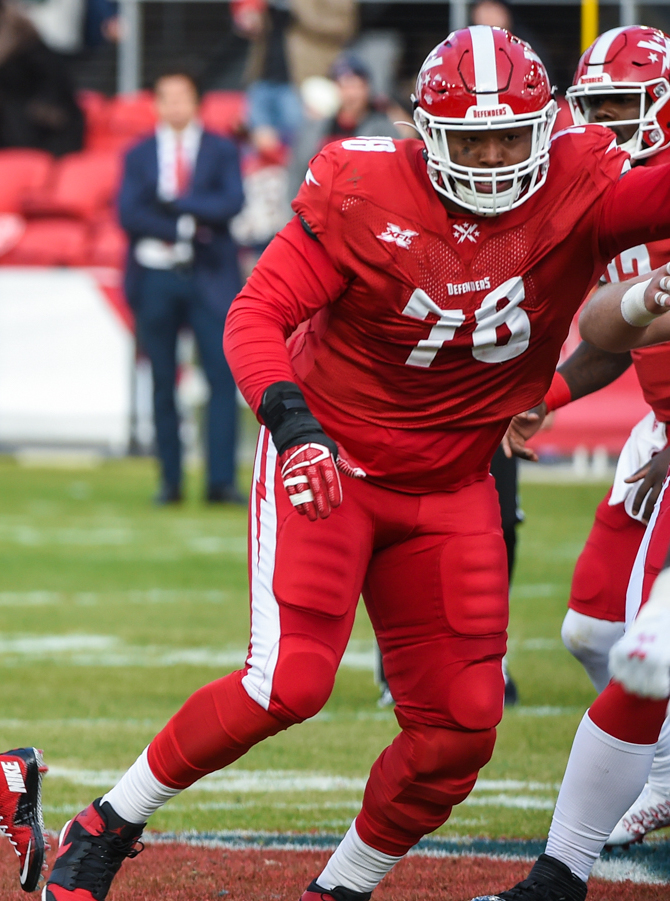
- Bunche with the DC Defenders in 2020

No. 78
- Position: Offensive tackle

Personal information
- Born: October 16, 1991 (age 35); Newark, Delaware, U.S.
- Listed height: 6 ft 6 in (1.98 m)
- Listed weight: 326 lb (148 kg)

Career information
- High school: Newark
- College: UCLA
- NFL draft: 2015: undrafted

Career history
- Philadelphia Eagles (2015–2016)*; Hamilton Tiger-Cats (2017)*; Jacksonville Jaguars (2017)*; New York Giants (2018)*; Arizona Hotshots (2019); New York Giants (2019)*; Washington Redskins (2019)*; DC Defenders (2020); San Antonio Brahmas (2023)
- * Offseason or practice squad member only
- Stats at Pro Football Reference
- Stats at CFL.ca

Malcolm Bunche (born October 16, 1991) is an American former football offensive tackle. He was originally signed by the Philadelphia Eagles, following the 2015 NFL draft. He played college football at Miami and UCLA. He was also a member of the Hamilton Tiger-Cats of the Canadian Football League (CFL), the Jacksonville Jaguars and New York Giants of the National Football League (NFL), and the DC Defenders of the XFL.

== College career ==
Bunche enrolled at the University of Miami in January 2010. He was relegated to the practice squad for the first year. He earned a letter in each of the following years.

Bunche began graduate studies at UCLA in 2014. He played nine games for the UCLA Bruins on special teams and as an offensive lineman.

== Professional career ==
=== Philadelphia Eagles ===
After going undrafted during the 2015 NFL Draft, Bunche signed as a free agent with the Philadelphia Eagles. On September 4, 2015, Bunche was cut in the final round of preseason cuts. On September 6, 2015, he was signed to the Eagles' practice squad.

On August 15, 2016, Bunche was waived by the Eagles.

=== Hamilton Tiger-Cats ===
Bunche was briefly a member of the Hamilton Tiger-Cats of the Canadian Football League (CFL), having been a member during training camp.

=== Jacksonville Jaguars ===
Bunche was signed by the Jacksonville Jaguars on August 3, 2017. He was waived on September 1, 2017.

=== New York Giants (first stint) ===
On May 14, 2018, Bunche signed with the New York Giants. He was waived on September 1, 2018.

=== Arizona Hotshots ===
In 2018, Bunche signed with the Arizona Hotshots of the Alliance of American Football for the 2019 season.

=== New York Giants (second stint) ===
On August 5, 2019, Bunche was signed by the New York Giants. He was waived on August 31, 2019.

=== Washington Redskins ===
On October 8, 2019, Bunche was signed to the Washington Redskins practice squad. Three days later Bunche was released.

=== DC Defenders ===
On November 22, 2019, Bunche was drafted by the DC Defenders in the 2020 XFL Supplemental Draft. He had his contract terminated when the league suspended operations on April 10, 2020.

=== San Antonio Brahmas ===
On November 17, 2022, Bunche was drafted by the San Antonio Brahmas of the XFL. He signed with the team on February 21, 2023. He was released on August 3, 2023.
