= Kiko Alonso =

American football player (born 1990)

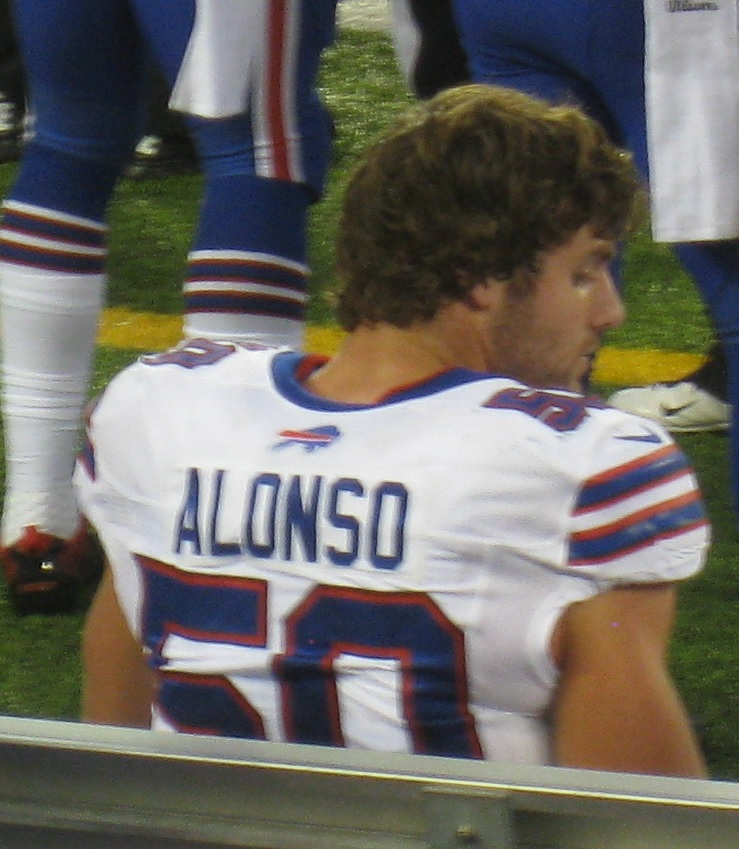
- Alonso with the Buffalo Bills in 2013

No. 50, 47, 54
- Position: Linebacker

Personal information
- Born: August 14, 1990 (age 36); Newton, Massachusetts, U.S.
- Listed height: 6 ft 3 in (1.91 m)
- Listed weight: 239 lb (108 kg)

Career information
- High school: Los Gatos (Los Gatos, California)
- College: Oregon (2008–2012)
- NFL draft: 2013: 2nd round, 46th overall pick

Career history
- Buffalo Bills (2013–2014); Philadelphia Eagles (2015); Miami Dolphins (2016–2018); New Orleans Saints (2019–2020); San Francisco 49ers (2020); New Orleans Saints (2022)*
- * Offseason or practice squad member only

Awards and highlights
- PFWA NFL Defensive Rookie of the Year (2013); PFWA All-Rookie Team (2013); Second-team All-Pac-12 (2012)

Career NFL statistics
- Total tackles: 588
- Sacks: 3
- Forced fumbles: 7
- Fumble recoveries: 7
- Interceptions: 10
- Defensive touchdowns: 1
- Stats at Pro Football Reference

Kristian "Kiko" Alonso (born August 14, 1990) is an American former professional football player who was a linebacker in the National Football League (NFL). He played college football for the Oregon Ducks and was selected by the Buffalo Bills in the second round of the 2013 NFL draft. He was traded four times in his NFL career, which is tied with Eric Dickerson and Brandin Cooks for an NFL record.

After being named the 2013 PFWA Defensive Rookie of the Year with the Bills, Alonso missed his second season due to a torn anterior cruciate ligament (ACL) and was then traded to the Philadelphia Eagles in 2015. Following an inconsistent season with the Eagles, he was traded to the Miami Dolphins, becoming entrenched as a starter for three years. He was traded again to the Saints in 2019, with whom he was primarily a reserve player. Following another ACL injury during the 2019 playoffs, he was traded to the 49ers in 2020, but was released later that season without ever playing a game.

== Early life ==
Kiko Alonso's father, Carlos, was born in Cuba but raised in Puerto Rico. His mother, Monica Alonso, is from Colombia. Kiko was born in Newton, Massachusetts. He has an older brother Carlos and a younger brother Lucas.

Kiko attended Los Gatos High School in Los Gatos, California. He led the De Anza League and Central Coast Section in tackles his senior year with 150 stops (81 unassisted). He also tallied double figures in tackles in 10 of 12 games, finished third on the team in quarterback sacks, and led the Wildcats in receiving (35 catches, 559 yards). He led Central Coast's sixth-ranked team to the league title (10–1–1) in 2007, with its lone loss his final year coming against Gilroy (40–34) in the sectional semifinals.

Rated a three-star recruit by Rivals.com, he was rated the No. 47 inside linebacker in the class of 2008, behind Etienne Sabino (No. 1), Dont'a Hightower (No. 15), and Stevenson Sylvester (No. 26). He accepted a scholarship offer from Oregon over a scholarship offer from Utah.

== College career ==
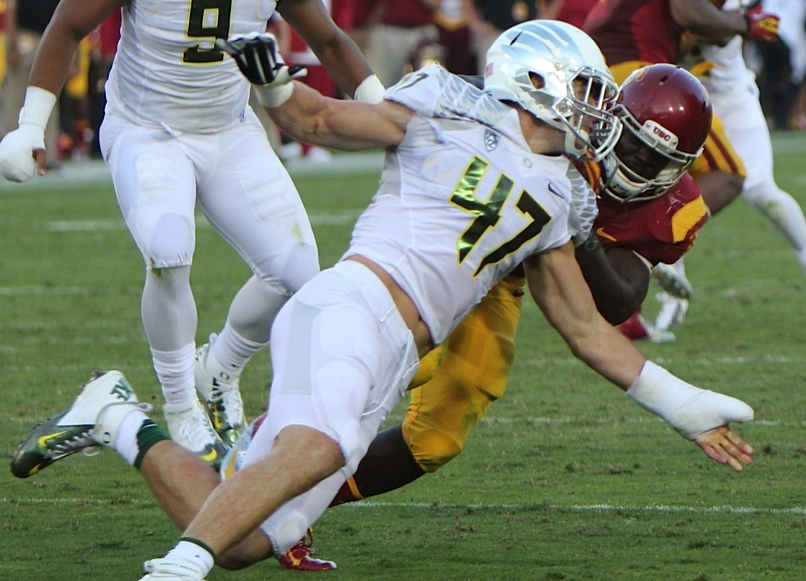
Alonso (47) with the Oregon Ducks in 2012

Alonso attended the University of Oregon, where he played for the Ducks football team from 2008 to 2012. After redshirting in 2008, he spent the 2009 season as the Ducks' primary reserve middle linebacker. He appeared in the final twelve games, accumulating 13 of his 16 tackles unassisted. In 2010, he spent the entire season suspended from the team for a DUI and other legal troubles. He returned the following season and was Oregon's eighth-leading tackler ranked fourth among linebackers with 46 stops, including 6 tackles for loss and 2.5 sacks. He was also named the 2012 Rose Bowl Defensive Player of the Game with one interception and five tackles, including career-highs of 1.5 sacks and 2.5 tackles for loss. In his final season, he started in all 13 games and earned second-team all-conference honors. He recorded 87 total tackles (62 solo, 25 assisted), including 16 tackles for loss, a sack, four interceptions, seven pass deflections and two forced fumbles.

=== Suspension ===
On February 19, 2010, Alonso was arrested and charged with a DUI. He was suspended for the 2010 season. Alonso was arrested again in May 2011 on charges of burglary, criminal trespassing and mischief. The charges stemmed from a woman who called 911 to report that Alonso banged on her door and demanded to let him in to her home. According to sources close to him, it is believed Alonso thought he was breaking into his own house. He pleaded guilty to all of the charges. He received two years of probation, and was ordered to undergo 200 hours of community service along with alcohol treatment programs. He was re-instated to the Ducks football team in early September 2011 after completing over community service and an alcoholic awareness program.

== Professional career ==
Pre-draft measurables
Height	Weight	Arm length	Hand span	40-yard dash	10-yard split	20-yard split	20-yard shuttle	Three-cone drill	Vertical jump	Broad jump
6 ft 3 3/8 in (1.91 m)	238 lb (108 kg)	32 1/8 in (0.82 m)	9 3/4 in (0.25 m)	4.74 s	1.66 s	2.71 s	4.18 s	6.96 s	30.5 in (0.77 m)	9 ft 9 in (2.97 m)
All values from NFL Combine.

=== Buffalo Bills ===
==== 2013 ====
The Buffalo Bills selected Alonso in the second round (46th overall) of the 2013 NFL draft. Alonso was the fifth linebacker drafted in 2013.

External videos
- Bills draft Kiko Alonso 46th overall
- 2013 NFL Draft Profile: Kiko Alonso

On May 14, 2013, the Bills signed Alonso to a four-year, $4.30 million contract that includes $2.46 million guaranteed and a signing bonus of $1.57 million.

Alonso was selected as a replacement for Nick Barnett and entered training camp as the starting middle linebacker. Head coach Doug Marrone named Alonso the starting middle linebacker to begin the regular season, alongside outside linebackers Nigel Bradham and Manny Lawson.

He made his professional regular season debut and first career start in the Buffalo Bills' season-opener against the New England Patriots and recorded nine combined tackles during their 23–21 loss. On September 15, 2013, Alonso recorded ten combined tackles, deflected a pass, made his first career sack, and made his first career interception during a 24–23 win against the Carolina Panthers in Week 2. Alonso intercepted a pass by Panthers' quarterback Cam Newton, that was originally intended for fullback Mike Tolbert, during the first quarter. In Week 3, Alonso recorded eight combined tackles and intercepted a pass by Jets' quarterback Geno Smith as the Bills lost 27–20 at the New York Jets. He became the first Bills' player to record an interception in back to back games since Jairus Byrd in 2009. On September 29, 2013, Alonso made five combined tackles and intercepted two passes by Ravens' quarterback Joe Flacco in a 23–20 win against the Baltimore Ravens in Week 4. On October 3, 2013, Alonso was named the NFL Defensive Rookie of the Month for the month of September. In Week 6, Alonso recorded a season-high 22 combined tackles (nine solo) during a 27–24 loss against the Cincinnati Bengals. Alonso started in all 16 games as a rookie in 2013 and recorded 159 combined tackles, four interceptions, four pass deflections, two sacks, and one forced fumble. Alonso finished with the third most tackles among all players in 2013, behind Vontaze Burfict and Paul Posluszny. Alonso was the only defensive player nominated for PFWA Rookie of the Year in 2013. On January 14, 2014, Alonso was named PFWA Defensive Rookie of the Year. Alonso was also named to the NFL's All-Under-25 Team for 2014. He was named to the PFWA All-Rookie Team.

==== 2014 ====
Bills General Manager Doug Whaley announced that Alonso would be shifted to the weakside linebacker position for the 2014–15 NFL season. Shortly after however, Alonso tore his anterior cruciate ligament while working out in Oregon and missed the entire 2014 season, as a seven to nine-month recovery was expected. On August 26, 2014, the Buffalo Bills placed Alonso on the reserve/non-football injury.

=== Philadelphia Eagles ===
On March 10, 2015, the Buffalo Bills traded Alonso to the Philadelphia Eagles in exchange for running back LeSean McCoy. The trade reunited Alonso with Philadelphia Eagles' head coach Chip Kelly, who was his head coach at Oregon.

During training camp, Alonso competed against Mychal Kendricks and DeMeco Ryans for a job as a starting inside linebacker. Head coach Chip Kelly named Alonso a backup inside linebacker to begin the regular season, behind DeMeco Ryans and Mychal Kendricks.

During the second quarter of a Week 2 contest against the Dallas Cowboys on September 20, 2015, Alonso suffered a Grade II sprain – a partial tear – of his repaired left anterior cruciate ligament. Alonso was inactive for the next five games (Weeks 3–7). In Week 17, he collected a season-high nine combined tackles during the Eagles' 35–30 victory at the New York Giants. He finished the season with 43 combined tackles (30 solo), one interception, and one pass deflection in 11 games and one start.

=== Miami Dolphins ===
==== 2016 ====
On March 9, 2016, the Philadelphia Eagles traded Alonso, cornerback Byron Maxwell, and a first round draft pick (13th overall) in the 2016 NFL draft to the Miami Dolphins in exchange for the Dolphins' first round draft pick (8th overall) in the 2016 NFL Draft. Alonso entered training camp slated as the starting middle linebacker. Head coach Adam Gase named Alonso the starting middle linebacker to begin the regular season, alongside Koa Misi and Jelani Jenkins.

In Week 5, he collected a season-high 12 combined tackles (eight solo) during a 30–17 loss against the Tennessee Titans. On November 13, 2016, Alonso made four solo tackles, broke up a pass, and returned an interception for his first career touchdown during a 31–24 win at the San Diego Chargers in Week 10. Alonso intercepted a pass by Chargers' quarterback Philip Rivers, that was intended for wide receiver Tyrell Williams, and returned it for a 60-yard touchdown during the fourth quarter. Alonso was inactive for the Dolphins' Week 14 victory against the Arizona Cardinals due to a hamstring injury. Alonso finished his first season as a member of the Miami Dolphins with 115 combined tackles (69 solo), four pass deflections, two interceptions, and one touchdown in 15 games and 15 starts.

The Miami Dolphins finished second in the AFC East with a 10–6 record and earned a playoff berth. On January 8, 2017, Alonso started his first career playoff game and recorded six combined tackles during their 30–12 loss at the Pittsburgh Steelers in the AFC Wildcard Game.

==== 2017 ====
On March 9, 2017, the Miami Dolphins placed a first-round tender on Alonso as a restricted free agent. On March 21, 2017, the Miami Dolphins signed Alonso to a four-year, $28.91 million contract that includes $18.50 million guaranteed and a signing bonus of $7.05 million.

Alonso entered training camp slated as a starting outside linebacker. Head coach Adam Gase named Alonso the starting weakside linebacker to begin the regular season. He started alongside strongside linebacker Lawrence Timmons and middle linebacker Mike Hull.

In Week 8, Alonso drew criticism for a hit on Baltimore Ravens quarterback Joe Flacco, which put Flacco in concussion protocol. The league conducted an investigation to determine if Alonso should be suspended, but decided not to suspend him. On November 3, 2017, Alonso was fined $9,115 by the league for his hit on Flacco. On December 24, 2017, Alonso collected a season-high 11 combined tackles (eight solo) during a 29–13 loss at the Kansas City Chiefs in Week 16. Alonso started in all 16 games in 2017 and recorded 115 combined tackles (79 solo), one pass deflection, and one sack.

==== 2018 ====
Alonso was named the starting strongside linebacker to begin the regular season in 2018. He started alongside rookie starting weakside linebacker Jerome Baker and middle linebacker Raekwon McMillan.

In Week 2, Alonso collected a season-high 13 solo tackles in the Dolphins' 20–12 win at the New York Jets. The following week, Alonso made 15 combined tackles (seven solo) during a 28–2 victory against the Oakland Raiders in Week 3.

Alonso once again received criticism for late hits on quarterbacks. He received a personal foul penalty and subsequent fine after colliding with a sliding Andrew Luck during a week 12 loss to the Indianapolis Colts. After a similar hit on Josh Allen during a week 17 tilt against the Buffalo Bills, Alonso was ejected from that game after a scuffle broke out between the Bills and Dolphins. In total he played for 5 different nfl teams.

=== New Orleans Saints (first stint) ===
On September 1, 2019, Alonso was traded to the New Orleans Saints in exchange for linebacker Vince Biegel. As a reserve linebacker, Alonso totaled 31 combined tackles on the season. He suffered another anterior cruciate ligament injury during the Saints' playoff game against the Minnesota Vikings. He was placed on the active/physically unable to perform list (PUP) at the start of training camp on August 1, 2020. He was moved to the reserve/PUP list at the start of the regular season on September 5, 2020.

=== San Francisco 49ers ===
On November 2, 2020, Alonso was traded to the San Francisco 49ers with a conditional fifth-round pick in the 2021 NFL draft in exchange for LB Kwon Alexander. Alonso was eligible to practice with the Saints and 49ers since October 19, 2020, but the 49ers declined to activate him from the PUP list by November 14, 2020, and he was ineligible to return during the season. He was released with a failed physical designation on November 23.

=== New Orleans Saints (second stint) ===
On August 5, 2022, Alonso signed with the Saints. However, the following day, Alonso announced his retirement from professional football.

== NFL career statistics ==
Year	Team	Games		Tackles				Fumbles				Interceptions					
Year	Team	GP	GS	Cmb	Solo	Ast	Sck	FF	FR	Yds	TD	PD	Int	Yds	Avg	Lng	TD
2013	BUF	16	16	159	87	72	2.0	1	2	13	0	4	4	38	9.5	32	0
2014	BUF	0	0	Did not play due to injury													
2015	PHI	11	1	43	30	13	0.0	0	0	0	0	1	1	0	0.0	0	0
2016	MIA	15	15	115	69	46	0.0	1	4	2	0	4	2	70	35.0	60T	1
2017	MIA	16	16	115	79	36	1.0	2	0	0	0	1	0	0	0.0	0	0
2018	MIA	15	15	125	79	46	0.0	3	1	0	0	6	3	30	10.0	15	0
2019	NO	13	4	31	25	6	0.0	0	0	0	0	1	0	0	0.0	0	0
Career		86	67	588	369	219	3.0	7	7	15	0	17	10	138	13.8	60T	1
