= Najee Goode =

American football player (born 1989)

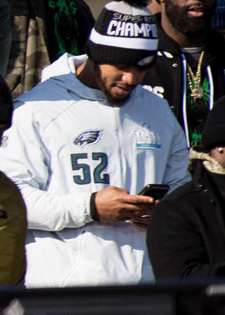
- Goode at the Eagles’ Super Bowl parade in 2018

No. 52, 53, 51
- Position: Linebacker

Personal information
- Born: June 4, 1989 (age 37); Cleveland, Ohio, U.S.
- Listed height: 6 ft 0 in (1.83 m)
- Listed weight: 244 lb (111 kg)

Career information
- High school: Benedictine (Cleveland)
- College: West Virginia
- NFL draft: 2012: 5th round, 140th overall pick

Career history
- Tampa Bay Buccaneers (2012); Philadelphia Eagles (2013–2017); Indianapolis Colts (2018); Jacksonville Jaguars (2019); Indianapolis Colts (2020)*
- * Offseason or practice squad member only

Awards and highlights
- Super Bowl champion (LII); First-team All-Big East (2011)

Career NFL statistics
- Total tackles: 107
- Sacks: 2
- Fumble recoveries: 1
- Interceptions: 1
- Total touchdowns: 2
- Stats at Pro Football Reference

Najee Goode (born June 4, 1989) is an American former professional football player who was a linebacker in the National Football League (NFL). He played college football for the West Virginia Mountaineers and was selected by the Tampa Bay Buccaneers in the fifth round of the 2012 NFL draft. He also played with the Philadelphia Eagles, with whom he won Super Bowl LII.

== Early life ==
Goode attended Benedictine High School where he lettered in football and track & field. In football, he was a dual-threat quarterback as well as a linebacker. He was named the Most Valuable Player (MVP) of the Cuyahoga County East-West high school All-star game. In track & field, he won the Division II state championship in the discus throw with a school record of 172’1".

He then attended West Virginia University (WVU) where he majored in industrial engineering. While at West Virginia, in 2011, he tied for fourth on the single season list for tackles-for-loss with 15.

== Professional career ==
=== Tampa Bay Buccaneers ===
After being selected by the Tampa Bay Buccaneers, Goode took part in their rookie mini-camp. On May 14, 2012, Buccaneers.com announced Goode had signed a four-year deal to become an official member of their NFL roster, the same day as college roommate, and Buccaneers teammate Keith Tandy signed his rookie deal.

He was released on September 1, 2013, when the Buccaneers trimmed their roster to 53 players.

=== Philadelphia Eagles ===
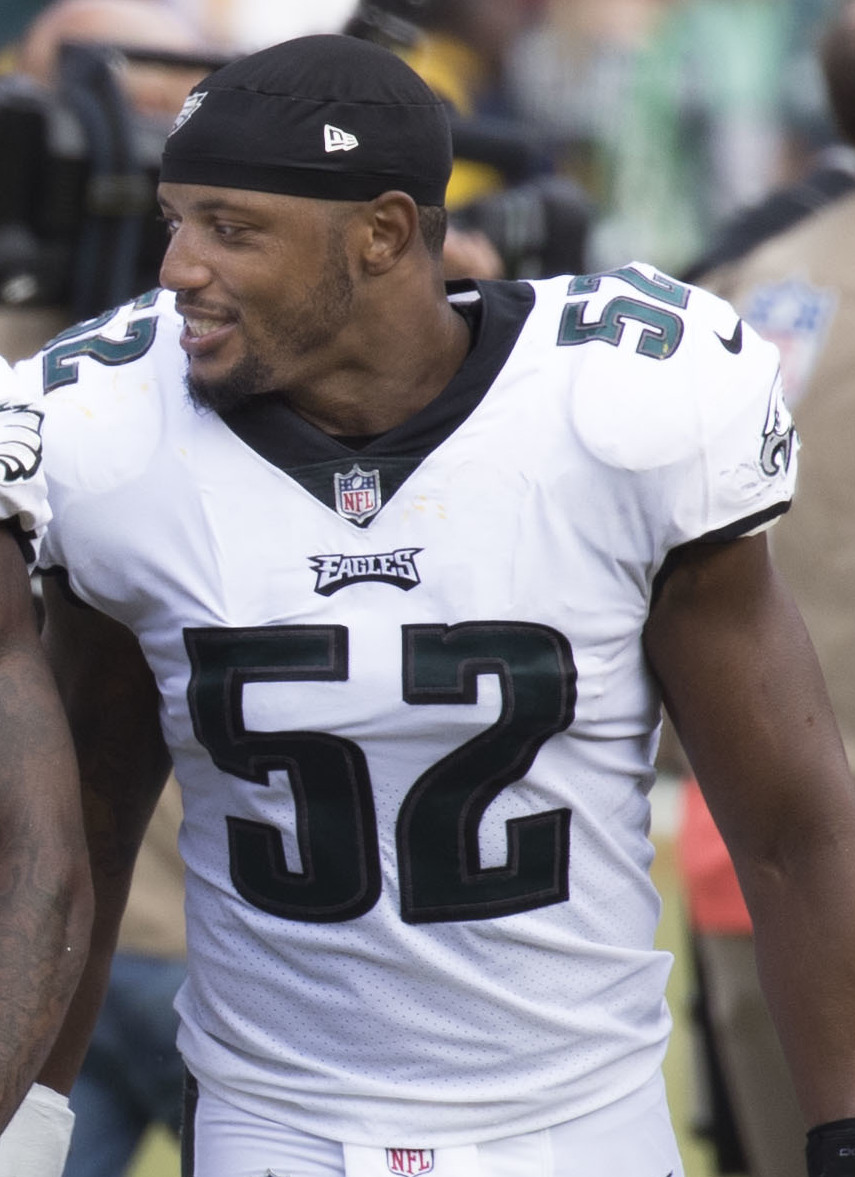
Goode with the Philadelphia Eagles in 2017

Goode was signed by the Philadelphia Eagles on September 2, 2013. On October 27, against the New York Giants, Goode scored his first career touchdown when a snap went over Giants punter Steve Weatherford's head which Goode recovered and ran two yards for the score.

On September 9, 2014, Goode was placed on injured reserve after injuring his pectoral muscle in the season opening win against the Jacksonville Jaguars.

Goode was released by the Eagles on September 5, 2015, for final roster cuts. He was re-signed on September 22. On December 6, Goode scored his second career touchdown on a blocked punt by Chris Maragos. The Eagles won over the New England Patriots, 35–28.

On February 10, 2016, Goode re-signed with the Eagles. On September 3, Goode was released by the Eagles during final cuts. On September 10, he was re-signed by the Eagles.

On March 8, 2017, Goode signed a one-year contract extension with the Eagles. Goode finished the 2017 season with 22 tackles and won Super Bowl LII when the Eagles defeated the New England Patriots 41–33. He had two tackles in the game.

=== Indianapolis Colts (first stint) ===
On April 4, 2018, Goode signed with the Indianapolis Colts.

=== Jacksonville Jaguars ===
On May 1, 2019, Goode signed with the Jacksonville Jaguars. He played in 10 games before being placed on injured reserve on November 26. Goode finished the season with a career-high 27 tackles, one sack, and two passes defensed.

=== Indianapolis Colts (second stint) ===
On October 8, 2020, Goode was signed to the Colts practice squad. He was released on October 27.

=== NFL statistics ===
NFL career statistics
Year	Team	GP	GS	Comb	Total	Solo	Sack	Int	PD	FF	FR
2012	TB	3	0	0	0	0	0.0	0	0	0	0
2013	PHI	14	1	21	15	6	1.0	0	4	0	1
2014	PHI	1	0	0	0	0	0.0	0	0	0	0
2015	PHI	14	0	11	9	2	0.0	0	0	0	0
2016	PHI	16	0	10	9	1	0.0	0	0	0	0
2017	PHI	16	3	22	18	4	0.0	0	0	0	0
2018	IND	16	0	16	6	9	0.0	1	1	0	0
2019	JAX	10	4	27	21	6	1.0	0	2	0	0
Career		90	8	107	79	28	2.0	1	7	0	1

== Personal life ==
He is the son of Fatimah and John Goode. Goode had a daughter born in June 2016. He was married on July 6, 2019 on Jekyll Island, Georgia.
