= 2016 Philadelphia Eagles season =

84th season in franchise history; first with Doug Pederson and Carson Wentz

- Owner: Jeffrey Lurie
- General manager: Howie Roseman
- Head coach: Doug Pederson
- Home stadium: Lincoln Financial Field

Results
- Record: 7–9
- Division place: 4th NFC East
- Playoffs: Did not qualify
- All-Pros: EDGE Brandon Graham (2nd team)
- Pro Bowlers: 4: DT Fletcher Cox; OT Jason Peters; RB Darren Sproles; C Jason Kelce

Uniform
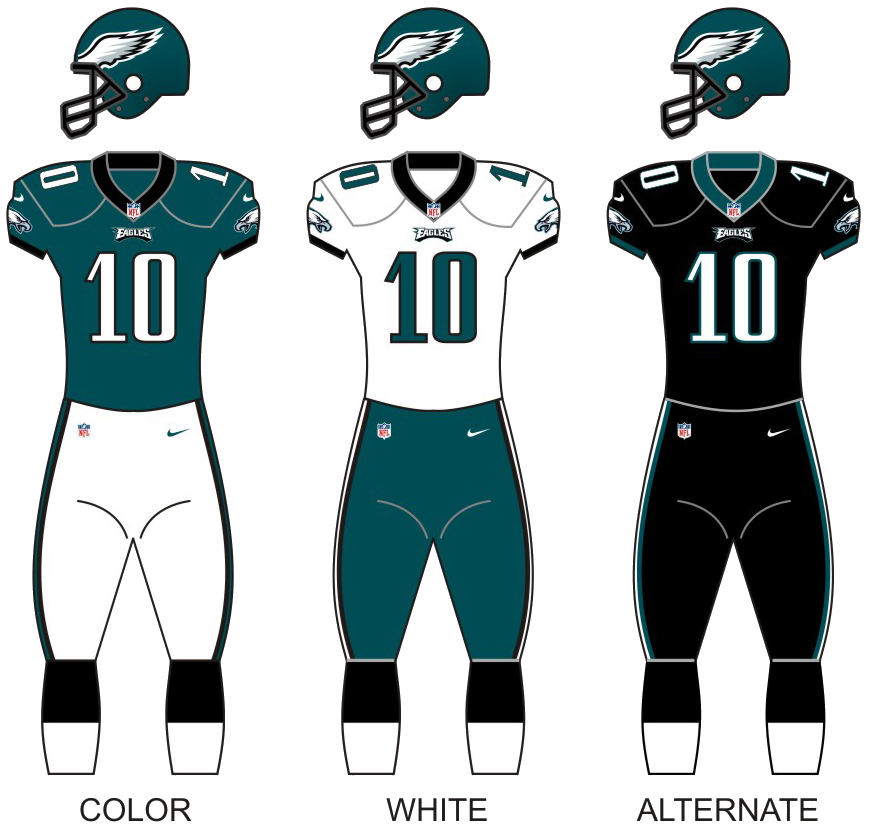

The 2016 season was the Philadelphia Eagles' 84th in the National Football League (NFL) and their first under head coach Doug Pederson. The Eagles named 2nd overall pick Carson Wentz the starting quarterback for Week 1 against the Cleveland Browns. The Eagles started 3–0 including a 34–3 win over their intrastate rivals, the Pittsburgh Steelers. Following their Week 4 bye, the Eagles went 4–9, including a 2–4 record against their divisional rivals. Following a 27–26 loss to the Baltimore Ravens in Week 15, the Eagles were eliminated from playoff contention for the third consecutive season and the fourth time in five seasons and suffered back-to-back losing seasons for the first time since 1998 and 1999. This was the last season the Eagles missed the playoffs until 2020. It was also the last season where they finished last in the division until then.

== Roster changes ==
=== Free agents ===
Position	Player	Tag	2016 Team	Notes
WR	Seyi Ajirotutu	UFA	TBD	
CB	E.J. Biggers	UFA	New England Patriots	Signed 1-year deal
QB	Sam Bradford	UFA	Philadelphia Eagles	Signed 2-year deal/$36 million deal
CB	Nolan Carroll	UFA	Philadelphia Eagles	Signed 1-year deal
DE	Vinny Curry	UFA	Philadelphia Eagles	Signed 5-year deal/$47.25 million deal
ILB	Najee Goode	UFA	Philadelphia Eagles	Signed 1-year deal
QB	Thad Lewis	UFA	San Francisco 49ers	Signed 1-year deal
C	David Molk	RFA	None	Player Retired
DE	Cedric Thornton	UFA	Dallas Cowboys	Signed 4-year/$18 million deal
S	Walter Thurmond	UFA	None	Player Retired
OT	Matt Tobin	RFA	Philadelphia Eagles	Signed 1-year /$1.6 million deal

Player re-signed by the Eagles

=== Free agent signings ===
Position	Player	Tag	2015 Team	Date signed	Notes
RB	Ross Scheuerman	UFA	Free Agent	January 21	Signed
WR	Xavier Rush	UFA	None	February 18	
CB	Aaron Grymes	UFA	Edmonton Eskimos	February 18	
QB	McLeod Bethel-Thompson	UFA	San Francisco 49ers	February 18	Signed
CB	Leodis McKelvin	UFA	Buffalo Bills	March 8	Signed 2 year/$6 million deal
S	Rodney McLeod	UFA	St. Louis Rams	March 9	Signed 5 year/$37 million deal
QB	Chase Daniel	UFA	Kansas City Chiefs	March 9	Signed 3 year/$21 million deal
OG	Brandon Brooks	UFA	Houston Texans	March 9	Signed 5 year/$40 million deal
LB	Nigel Bradham	UFA	Buffalo Bills	March 9	Signed 2-year deal
CB	Ron Brooks	UFA	Buffalo Bills	March 9	Signed 3-year deal
WR	Chris Givens	UFA	Baltimore Ravens	March 16	Signed 1-year deal
WR	Rueben Randle	UFA	New York Giants	March 23	Signed 1-year deal
C	Stefen Wisniewski	UFA	Jacksonville Jaguars	April 4	Signed 1-year deal
P	Ryan Quigley	UFA	New York Jets	April 18	Signed 1-year deal
WR	T. J. Graham	UFA	New Orleans Saints	April 22	Signed 1-year deal

=== Trades ===
- On March 9, the Eagles traded cornerback Byron Maxwell, linebacker Kiko Alonso, and the 13th overall pick in the 2016 NFL draft to the Miami Dolphins for the 8th overall draft pick.
- On March 9, the Eagles traded running back DeMarco Murray and their 4th round draft pick to the Tennessee Titans for their 4th round draft pick.
- On March 11, the Eagles traded quarterback Mark Sanchez to the Denver Broncos for a conditional 7th-round pick in 2017 NFL draft— predicated upon Sanchez making the Broncos' 2016 Week 1 roster.
- On April 20, the Eagles traded their 2016 1st, 3rd, and 4th-round picks, along with their 2017 1st-round pick and their 2018 2nd-round pick to the Cleveland Browns for the 2nd overall pick the 2016 NFL Draft.
- On August 16, the Eagles traded offensive tackle Dennis Kelly to the Tennessee Titans for wide receiver Dorial Green-Beckham.
- On September 4, The Eagles traded Sam Bradford to the Minnesota Vikings for their 2017 1st-round pick and their 2018 conditional 4th-round pick.
- On September 7, The Eagles traded Eric Rowe to the New England Patriots for their 2018 conditional 4th-round pick.

=== Roster changes ===
The Eagles cut wide receiver Riley Cooper on February 8, 2016. They later cut veteran linebacker DeMeco Ryans on February 24, 2016.

== Draft ==
2016 Philadelphia Eagles draft
Round	Pick	Player	Position	College	Notes
1	2	Carson Wentz *	QB	North Dakota State	From Cleveland
3	79	Isaac Seumalo	OG	Oregon State	
5	153	Wendell Smallwood	RB	West Virginia	
5	164	Halapoulivaati Vaitai	OT	TCU	From Pittsburgh
6	196	Blake Countess	CB	Auburn	from Houston via New England, Miami and Minnesota
7	233	Jalen Mills	S	LSU	
7	240	Alex McCalister	DE	Florida	from Buffalo via Minnesota
7	251	Joe Walker	LB	Oregon	from Arizona
Made roster † Pro Football Hall of Fame * Made at least one Pro Bowl during career

Notes

- The Eagles traded their second-round selection, along with a 2015 fourth-round selection and quarterback Nick Foles to the St. Louis Rams in exchange for the Rams' 2015 fifth-round selection and quarterback Sam Bradford.
- The Eagles acquired an additional third-round selection in a trade that sent their 2015 fourth-round selection to the Detroit Lions.
- The Eagles conditionally acquired an additional fifth-round selection in a trade that sent cornerback Brandon Boykin to the Pittsburgh Steelers; the condition could have upgraded to a fourth-rounder if Boykin played at least 60% of the snaps with the Steelers during the 2015 season, but he did not.
- The Eagles conditionally acquired an additional seventh-round selection in a trade that sent quarterback Matt Barkley to the Arizona Cardinals; the Eagles were to only receive this selection if Barkley was on the Cardinals' 2015 roster for at least six games, which was fulfilled on October 17, 2015.

=== Undrafted free agents ===
Position	Player	College
LB	Quentin Gause	Rutgers
DT	Connor Wujciak	Boston College
WR	Hunter Sharp	Utah State
DE	Aziz Shittu	Stanford
CB	CJ Smith	North Dakota State
DT	Destiny Vaeao	Washington State
RB	Byron Marshall	Oregon
RB	Cedric O'Neal	Valdosta State
LB	Myke Tavarres	Incarnate Word
WR	Cayleb Jones	Arizona
C	Bruce Johnson	Maine
OG	Darrell Greene	San Diego State
LS	John DePalma	West Virginia
TE	Dillon Gordon	LSU
WR	Marcus Johnson	Texas

== Staff ==
2016 Philadelphia Eagles staff
Front office: Chairman/CEO – Jeffrey Lurie; President – Don Smolenski; Executive vice president of football operations – Howie Roseman; Senior football advisor – Tom Donahoe; Vice president of player personnel – Joe Douglas (American football); Assistant director of player personnel – Andy Weidl; Vice president of football operations and strategy – Alec Halaby; Senior director of college scouting – Anthony Patch; Director of college scouting – Trey Brown; Assistant director of college scouting – Mike Bradway; Director of pro scouting – Dwayne Joseph; Director of personnel operations – Joe Pannunzio; Director of scouting administration/personnel scout – Chris Shea; Director of football administration – Jake Rosenberg; Player personnel executive – Rick Mueller; Football operations executive – Brian Dawkins; Head coaches: Head coach – Doug Pederson; Offensive coaches: Offensive coordinator – Frank Reich; Quarterbacks – John DeFilippo; Running backs – Duce Staley; Wide receivers – Greg Lewis; Tight ends – Justin Peelle; Offensive line – Jeff Stoutland; Assistant offensive line/tight ends/run game – Eugene Chung; Offensive quality control/assistant quarterbacks – Press Taylor; Offensive quality control/assistant wide receivers – Joe D'Orazio	Defensive coaches: Defensive coordinator – Jim Schwartz; Defensive line – Chris Wilson; Linebackers – Ken Flajole; Secondary – Cory Undlin; Safeties – Tim Hauck; Defensive quality control/assistant defensive line – Phillip Daniels; Defensive quality control/assistant secondary – Dino Vasso; Special teams coaches: Special teams coordinator – Dave Fipp; Assistant special teams – Matthew Harper; Strength and conditioning: Head strength and conditioning – Josh Hingst; Assistant strength and conditioning – Ben Wagner; Assistant strength and conditioning – Keith Gray; Director of sports science and reconditioning – Shaun Huls

== Final roster ==
2016 Philadelphia Eagles roster
Quarterbacks (QB): 10 Chase Daniel; 11 Carson Wentz; Running backs (RB): 39 Byron Marshall; 43 Darren Sproles; 35 Terrell Watson; Wide receivers (WR): 17 Nelson Agholor; 18 Dorial Green-Beckham; 81 Jordan Matthews; 16 Bryce Treggs; 19 Paul Turner; Tight ends (TE): 47 Trey Burton; 87 Brent Celek; 86 Zach Ertz	Offensive linemen (OL): 68 Josh Andrews G; 76 Allen Barbre G/T; 79 Brandon Brooks G; 69 Dillon Gordon G; 62 Jason Kelce C; 65 Lane Johnson T; 71 Jason Peters T; 73 Isaac Seumalo G/T; 72 Halapoulivaati Vaitai T; 61 Stefen Wisniewski G; Defensive linemen (DL): 94 Beau Allen DT; 98 Connor Barwin DE; 91 Fletcher Cox DT; 75 Vinny Curry DE; 55 Brandon Graham DE; 77 Taylor Hart DT; 96 Bennie Logan DT; 51 Steven Means DE; 90 Marcus Smith DE; 97 Destiny Vaeao DT	Linebackers (LB): 53 Nigel Bradham OLB; 56 Bryan Braman OLB; 52 Najee Goode MLB; 54 Kamu Grugier-Hill OLB; 58 Jordan Hicks MLB; 95 Mychal Kendricks OLB; 50 Stephen Tulloch OLB; Defensive backs (DB): 29 Terrence Brooks SS; 22 Nolan Carroll CB; 36 Dwayne Gratz CB; 27 Malcolm Jenkins FS; 42 Chris Maragos SS; 21 Leodis McKelvin CB; 23 Rodney McLeod SS; 31 Jalen Mills CB; 37 C. J. Smith CB; 26 Jaylen Watkins FS; Special teams (ST): 8 Donnie Jones P; 45 Rick Lovato LS; 6 Caleb Sturgis K	Practice squad: 48 Don Cherry MLB; 82 Anthony Denham TE; 78 Darrell Greene G; 38 Aaron Grymes CB; 84 Marcus Johnson WR; 2 Aaron Murray QB; 74 Aaron Neary C; 93 Aziz Shittu DT; 14 David Watford WR; Reserve: 33 Ron Brooks CB (IR); 34 Kenjon Barner RB (IR); 46 Jon Dorenbos LS (IR); 24 Ryan Mathews RB (IR); 57 Alex McCalister OLB (IR); 28 Wendell Smallwood RB (IR); 64 Matt Tobin T (IR); 59 Joe Walker MLB (IR); Rookies in italics 53 active, 8 reserve, 9 practice squad

== Schedule ==
=== Preseason ===
Week	Date	Opponent	Result	Record	Venue	Recap
1	August 11	Tampa Bay Buccaneers	**W** 17–9	1–0	Lincoln Financial Field	Recap
2	August 18	at Pittsburgh Steelers	**W** 17–0	2–0	Heinz Field	Recap
3	August 27	at Indianapolis Colts	**W** 33–23	3–0	Lucas Oil Stadium	Recap
4	September 1	New York Jets	**W** 14–6	4–0	Lincoln Financial Field	Recap

=== Regular season ===
Week	Date	Opponent	Result	Record	Venue	Recap
1	September 11	Cleveland Browns	**W** 29–10	1–0	Lincoln Financial Field	Recap
2	September 19	at Chicago Bears	**W** 29–14	2–0	Soldier Field	Recap
3	September 25	Pittsburgh Steelers	**W** 34–3	3–0	Lincoln Financial Field	Recap
4	Bye					
5	October 9	at Detroit Lions	**L** 23–24	3–1	Ford Field	Recap
6	October 16	at **Washington Redskins**	**L** 20–27	3–2	FedExField	Recap
7	October 23	Minnesota Vikings	**W** 21–10	4–2	Lincoln Financial Field	Recap
8	October 30	at **Dallas Cowboys**	**L** 23–29 (OT)	4–3	AT&T Stadium	Recap
9	November 6	at **New York Giants**	**L** 23–28	4–4	MetLife Stadium	Recap
10	November 13	Atlanta Falcons	**W** 24–15	5–4	Lincoln Financial Field	Recap
11	November 20	at Seattle Seahawks	**L** 15–26	5–5	CenturyLink Field	Recap
12	November 28	Green Bay Packers	**L** 13–27	5–6	Lincoln Financial Field	Recap
13	December 4	at Cincinnati Bengals	**L** 14–32	5–7	Paul Brown Stadium	Recap
14	December 11	**Washington Redskins**	**L** 22–27	5–8	Lincoln Financial Field	Recap
15	December 18	at Baltimore Ravens	**L** 26–27	5–9	M&T Bank Stadium	Recap
16	December 22	**New York Giants**	**W** 24–19	6–9	Lincoln Financial Field	Recap
17	January 1	**Dallas Cowboys**	**W** 27–13	7–9	Lincoln Financial Field	Recap

Note: Intra-division opponents are in bold text.

=== Game summaries ===
==== Week 1: vs. Cleveland Browns ====
Week One: Cleveland Browns at Philadelphia Eagles – Game summary

Quarter	1	2	3	4	Total
Browns	0	7	3	0	**10**
**Eagles**	7	6	9	7	**29**

at Lincoln Financial Field, Philadelphia, Pennsylvania

- Date: September 11
- Game time: 1:00 p.m. EDT
- Game weather: 85 °F (29 °C), partly cloudy
- Game attendance: 69,596
- Referee: Walt Anderson
- TV announcers (CBS): Greg Gumbel, Trent Green and Jamie Erdahl
- Recap, Gamebook

Game information

**First quarter**

- PHI – Jordan Matthews 19-yard pass from Carson Wentz (Caleb Sturgis kick), 9:50. Eagles 7–0. **Drive: 9 plays, 75 yards, 5:10.**

**Second quarter**

- PHI – Caleb Sturgis 22-yard field goal, 12:30. Eagles 10–0. **Drive: 5 plays, 31 yards, 2:14.**
- CLE – Isaiah Crowell 2-yard run (Patrick Murray kick), 9:11. Eagles 10–7. **Drive: 7 plays, 75 yards, 3:19.**
- PHI – Caleb Sturgis 38-yard field goal, 0:27. Eagles 13–7. **Drive: 11 plays, 60 yards, 3:16.**

**Third quarter**

- CLE – Patrick Murray 35-yard field goal, 13:57. Eagles 13–10. **Drive: 5 plays, 58 yards, 1:03.**
- PHI – Cameron Erving fumble out of bounds in end zone for a safety, 10:49. Eagles 15–10.
- PHI – Nelson Agholor 35-yard pass from Carson Wentz (Caleb Sturgis kick), 6:17. Eagles 22–10. **Drive: 9 plays, 73 yards, 4:32.**

**Fourth quarter**

- PHI – Ryan Mathews 1-yard run (Caleb Sturgis kick), 1:12. Eagles 29–10. **Drive: 5 plays, 15 yards, 2:24.**

**Top passers**

- CLE – Robert Griffin III – 12/26, 190 yards, INT
- PHI – Carson Wentz – 22/37, 278 yards, 2 TD

**Top rushers**

- CLE – Isaiah Crowell – 12 rushes, 62 yards, TD
- PHI – Ryan Mathews – 22 rushes, 77 yards, TD

**Top receivers**

- CLE – Corey Coleman – 2 receptions, 69 yards
- PHI – Jordan Matthews – 7 receptions, 114 yards, TD

The Eagles kicked off the 2016 season against the Cleveland Browns. 2nd Overall pick Carson Wentz made his debut. The Eagles started off well. Wentz threw his 1st career TD to Jordan Matthews. Caleb Sturgis missed a field goal in the 1st Quarter but did made one early in the 2nd Quarter to extend the lead to 10–0. The Browns would respond early in the 2nd quarter with an Isaiah Crowell 1-yard TD to cut the Eagles lead to 10–7. The Eagles only managed to kick another Sturgis field goal in the 2nd Quarter which resulted in a 13–7 lead at halftime. The Browns then kicked another field goal to change the score to 13–10. Midway through the 3rd Quarter, a bad snap by Browns center Cameron Erving went over the head of Quarterback Robert Griffin III and into the end zone for a safety and it extended the Eagles lead to 15–10. Following that drive, Wentz and the offense went back to work. Wentz threw his 2nd TD to Nelson Agholor to change the score to 22–10. The Eagles mainly burned out the clock in the 4th quarter to weaken the Browns hopes of a comeback. Ryan Mathews sealed the game with a 1-yard TD to make the final score 29–10.

With the win, the Eagles opened the season 1–0.

==== Week 2: at Chicago Bears ====
Week Two: Philadelphia Eagles at Chicago Bears – Game summary

Quarter	1	2	3	4	Total
**Eagles**	3	6	13	7	**29**
Bears	0	7	0	7	**14**

at Soldier Field, Chicago, Illinois

- Date: September 19
- Game time: 8:30 p.m. EDT/7:30 p.m. CDT
- Game weather: 84 °F (29 °C), mostly cloudy
- Game attendance: 62,268
- Referee: Jeff Triplette
- TV announcers (ESPN): Sean McDonough, Jon Gruden and Lisa Salters
- Recap, Gamebook

Game information

**First quarter**

- PHI – Caleb Sturgis 25-yard field goal, 6:11. Eagles 3–0. **Drive: 13 plays, 47 yards, 7:26.**

**Second quarter**

- CHI – Jeremy Langford 1-yard run (Connor Barth kick), 11:16. Bears 7–3. **Drive: 6 plays, 65 yards, 3:44.**
- PHI – Caleb Sturgis 29-yard field goal, 2:27. Bears 7–6. **Drive: 11 plays, 77 yards, 5:11.**
- PHI – Caleb Sturgis 53-yard field goal, 0:03. Eagles 9–7. **Drive: 8 plays, 38 yards, 1:35.**

**Third quarter**

- PHI – Ryan Mathews 3-yard run (Caleb Sturgis kick), 0:53. Eagles 16–7. **Drive: 8 plays, 68 yards, 4:31.**
- PHI – Trey Burton 2-yard pass from Carson Wentz (kick failed, hit left upright), 0:32. Eagles 22–7. **Drive: 1 play, 2 yards, 0:04.**

**Fourth quarter**

- PHI – Ryan Mathews 1-yard run (Caleb Sturgis kick), 10:36. Eagles 29–7. **Drive: 6 plays, 46 yards, 3:05.**
- CHI – Eddie Royal 65-yard punt return (Connor Barth kick), 5:09. Eagles 29–14.

**Top passers**

- PHI – Carson Wentz – 20/33, 183 yards, TD
- CHI – Jay Cutler – 12/17, 157 yards, INT

**Top rushers**

- PHI – Darren Sproles – 12 rushes, 40 yards
- CHI – Jeremy Langford – 11 rushes, 28 yards, TD

**Top receivers**

- PHI – Jordan Matthews – 6 receptions, 71 yards
- CHI – Alshon Jeffery – 5 receptions, 96 yards

Following their big win at home, the Eagles trailed to Illinois to square off Jay Cutler and the Bears in Soldier Field. The Bears scored a touchdown early in the 2nd Quarter by Jeremy Langford. The Eagles only got away with 3 field goals throughout the first half, leading 9–7 at the half. However, things turned around in the 2nd half. Cutler fumbled early in the 3rd quarter, setting up a Ryan Mathews 3-yard touchdown to increase the Eagles lead to 16–7. On the Bears' next drive, Cutler threw an interception to Linebacker Nigel Bradham to set up a touchdown from Carson Wentz to tight end Trey Burton to increase their lead to 22–7. (Kicker Caleb Sturgis missed the extra point.) Cutler left the game with a thumb injury. Backup Brian Hoyer came to relieve him. Early in the 4th quarter, Jeremy Langford fumbled, giving the Eagles the ball at the Bears 47-yard line. The Eagles mainly burned out the clock throughout the 4th quarter. Mathews ran for another touchdown to extend their lead to 29–7. Eddie Royal returned a punt for a touchdown with 5 minutes to go in the 4th quarter. However, the Eagles pulled away the game to end their chances.

With the win, the Eagles moved to 2–0 and tied the New York Giants for first place in the NFC East.

==== Week 3: vs. Pittsburgh Steelers ====
Week Three: Pittsburgh Steelers at Philadelphia Eagles – Game summary

Quarter	1	2	3	4	Total
Steelers	0	3	0	0	**3**
**Eagles**	3	10	21	0	**34**

at Lincoln Financial Field, Philadelphia, Pennsylvania

- Date: September 25
- Game time: 4:25 p.m. EDT
- Game weather: 73 °F (23 °C), sunny
- Game attendance: 69,596
- Referee: Brad Allen
- TV announcers (CBS): Jim Nantz, Phil Simms and Tracy Wolfson
- Recap, Gamebook

Game information

**First quarter**

- PHI – Caleb Sturgis 29-yard field goal, 5:29. Eagles 3–0. **Drive: 7 plays, 63 yards, 3:20.**

**Second quarter**

- PHI – Jordan Matthews 12-yard pass from Carson Wentz (Caleb Sturgis kick), 12:04. Eagles 10–0. **Drive: 12 plays, 82 yards, 6:06.**
- PIT – Chris Boswell 40-yard field goal, 7:40. Eagles 10–3. **Drive: 8 plays, 61 yards, 4:24.**
- PHI – Caleb Sturgis 38-yard field goal, 2:25. Eagles 13–3. **Drive: 10 plays, 58 yards, 5:15.**

**Third quarter**

- PHI – Darren Sproles 73-yard pass from Carson Wentz (Caleb Sturgis kick), 12:54. Eagles 20–3. **Drive: 3 plays, 75 yards, 2:06.**
- PHI – Wendell Smallwood 1-yard run (Caleb Sturgis kick), 5:45. Eagles 27–3. **Drive: 7 plays, 67 yards, 4:58.**
- PHI – Kenjon Barner 8-yard run (Caleb Sturgis kick), 1:52. Eagles 34–3. **Drive: 3 plays, 41 yards, 1:24.**

**Fourth quarter**

- No scoring plays

**Top passers**

- PIT – Ben Roethlisberger – 24/44, 257 yards, INT
- PHI – Carson Wentz – 23/31, 301 yards, 2 TD

**Top rushers**

- PIT – DeAngelo Williams – 8 rushes, 21 yards
- PHI – Wendell Smallwood – 17 rushes, 79 yards, TD

**Top receivers**

- PIT – Antonio Brown – 12 receptions, 140 yards
- PHI – Darren Sproles – 6 receptions, 128 yards, TD

The Eagles returned home to face their long time state rivals, the Pittsburgh Steelers. The Eagles blocked a Chris Boswell field goal to deny 3 points. The Eagles drew first blood with a Caleb Strugis field goal to make the score 3–0. Early in the 2nd quarter, Rookie Quarterback Carson Wentz threw a 12-yard touchdown to Jordan Matthews to add to their lead. The Steelers finally got on board with a Chris Boswell field goal which turned out to be the only scoring play for the Steelers. Strugis notched another field goal to extend their lead to 13–3 at the half. Then, early in the 2nd Half, Wentz threw a 73-yard touchdown to running back Darren Sproles to extend their lead to 20–3. After a Steelers 3 and out, rookie running back Wendell Smallwood scored his first career rushing touchdown and it extend to Eagles lead to 27–3. On the Steelers next drive, veteran quarterback Ben Roethlisberger fumbled the football which the Eagles recovered. The Eagles would score a Kenjon Barner rushing touchdown to create a stunning 31 point lead. The Eagles defense shut down the Steelers offense. Roethlisberger threw an interception to Rodney McLeod late in the game as the Eagles pulled away a huge 34–3 win.

With their 9th win at home against Pittsburgh since 1965, The Eagles headed into their bye week with a commanding 3–0 record and 1st place in NFC East. (The Giants lost to the Redskins earlier in the day.)

==== Week 5: at Detroit Lions ====
Week Five: Philadelphia Eagles at Detroit Lions – Game summary

Quarter	1	2	3	4	Total
Eagles	0	10	10	3	**23**
**Lions**	14	7	0	3	**24**

at Ford Field, Detroit, Michigan

- Date: October 9
- Game time: 1:00 p.m. EDT
- Game weather: Played indoors (dome stadium)
- Game attendance: 58,047
- Referee: Pete Morelli
- TV announcers (Fox): Thom Brennaman, Charles Davis, Chris Spielman and Peter Schrager
- Recap, Gamebook

Game information

**First quarter**

- DET – Theo Riddick 1-yard pass from Matthew Stafford (Matt Prater kick), 9:37. Lions 7–0. **Drive: 11 plays, 75 yards, 5:23.**
- DET – Theo Riddick 17-yard pass from Matthew Stafford (Matt Prater kick), 0:53. Lions 14–0. **Drive: 9 plays, 80 yards, 5:09.**

**Second quarter**

- PHI – Ryan Mathews 1-yard pass from Carson Wentz (Caleb Sturgis kick), 10:21. Lions 14–7. **Drive: 9 plays, 75 yards, 5:32.**
- DET – Marvin Jones 1-yard pass from Matthew Stafford (Matt Prater kick), 3:08. Lions 21–7. **Drive: 12 plays, 75 yards, 7:13.**
- PHI – Caleb Sturgis 50-yard field goal, 0:00. Lions 21–10. **Drive: 11 plays, 43 yards, 3:08.**

**Third quarter**

- PHI – Josh Huff 1-yard pass from Carson Wentz (Caleb Sturgis kick), 9:18. Lions 21–17. **Drive: 9 plays, 75 yards, 5:42.**
- PHI – Caleb Sturgis 33-yard field goal, 6:47. Lions 21–20. **Drive: 4 plays, 2 yards, 1:00.**

**Fourth quarter**

- PHI – Caleb Sturgis 49-yard field goal, 6:40. Eagles 23–21. **Drive: 11 plays, 49 yards, 5:21.**
- DET – Matt Prater 29-yard field goal, 1:29. Lions 24–23. **Drive: 7 plays, 34 yards, 1:06.**

**Top passers**

- PHI – Carson Wentz – 25/32, 238 yards, 2 TD, INT
- DET – Matthew Stafford – 18/24, 153 yards, 3 TD

**Top rushers**

- PHI – Darren Sproles – 5 rushes, 45 yards
- DET – Theo Riddick – 11 rushes, 49 yards

**Top receivers**

- PHI – Jordan Matthews – 4 receptions, 65 yards
- DET – Anquan Boldin – 4 receptions, 48 yards

==== Week 6: at Washington Redskins ====
Week Six: Philadelphia Eagles at Washington Redskins – Game summary

Quarter	1	2	3	4	Total
Eagles	0	14	0	6	**20**
**Redskins**	7	14	3	3	**27**

at FedExField, Landover, Maryland

- Date: October 16
- Game time: 1:00 p.m. EDT
- Game weather: 69 °F (21 °C), sunny
- Game attendance: 78,934
- Referee: John Parry
- TV announcers (Fox): Kenny Albert, John Lynch and Pam Oliver
- Recap, Gamebook

Game information

**First quarter**

- WAS – Jamison Crowder 16-yard pass from Kirk Cousins (Dustin Hopkins kick), 0:51. Redskins 7–0. **Drive: 3 plays, 71 yards, 1:31.**

**Second quarter**

- WAS – Vernon Davis 13-yard pass from Kirk Cousins (Dustin Hopkins kick), 7:48. Redskins 14–0. **Drive: 9 plays, 90 yards, 5:31.**
- PHI – Wendell Smallwood 86-yard kickoff return (Caleb Sturgis kick), 7:37. Redskins 14–7. **Drive: 0 plays, 0 yards, 0:11.**
- PHI – Malcolm Jenkins 62-yard interception return (Caleb Sturgis kick), 3:55. Tied 14–14.
- WAS – Matt Jones 1-yard run (Dustin Hopkins kick), 0:06. Redskins 21–14. **Drive: 13 plays, 75 yards, 3:49.**

**Third quarter**

- WAS – Dustin Hopkins 32-yard field goal, 8:40. Redskins 24–14. **Drive: 12 plays, 65 yards, 6:20.**

**Fourth quarter**

- PHI – Caleb Sturgis 38-yard field goal, 12:57. Redskins 24–17. **Drive: 9 plays, 70 yards, 3:50.**
- WAS – Dustin Hopkins 50-yard field goal, 9:43. Redskins 27–17. **Drive: 7 plays, 58 yards, 3:13.**
- PHI – Caleb Sturgis 28-yard field goal, 5:20. Redskins 27–20. **Drive: 8 plays, 69 yards, 4:23.**

**Top passers**

- PHI – Carson Wentz – 11/22, 179 yards
- WAS – Kirk Cousins – 18/34, 263 yards, 2 TD, INT

**Top rushers**

- PHI – Ryan Mathews – 9 rushes, 60 yards
- WAS – Matt Jones – 16 rushes, 135 yards, TD

**Top receivers**

- PHI – Jordan Matthews – 3 receptions, 75 yards
- WAS – Pierre Garçon – 6 receptions, 77 yards

==== Week 7: vs. Minnesota Vikings ====
Week Seven: Minnesota Vikings at Philadelphia Eagles – Game summary

Quarter	1	2	3	4	Total
Vikings	0	3	0	7	**10**
**Eagles**	0	11	7	3	**21**

at Lincoln Financial Field, Philadelphia, Pennsylvania

- Date: October 23
- Game time: 1:00 p.m. EDT
- Game weather: 62 °F (17 °C), clear
- Game attendance: 69,596
- Referee: John Hussey
- TV announcers (Fox): Thom Brennaman, Troy Aikman and Erin Andrews
- Recap, Gamebook

Game information

**First quarter**

- None

**Second quarter**

- MIN – Blair Walsh 48-yard field goal, 9:01. Vikings 3–0. **Drive: 12 plays, 50 yards, 4:57.**
- PHI – Josh Huff 98-yard kick return (Carson Wentz run), 8:48. Eagles 8–3. **Drive: 0 plays, 0 yards, 0:13.**
- PHI – Caleb Sturgis 35-yard field goal, 0:07. Eagles 11–3. **Drive: 10 plays, 35 yards, 2:35.**

**Third quarter**

- PHI – Dorial Green-Beckham 5-yard pass from Carson Wentz (Caleb Sturgis kick), 5:45. Eagles 18–3. **Drive: 9 plays, 77 yards, 5:51.**

**Fourth quarter**

- PHI – Caleb Sturgis 21-yard field goal, 6:09. Eagles 21–3. **Drive: 9 plays, 47 yards, 5:20.**
- MIN – Cordarrelle Patterson 14-yard pass from Sam Bradford (Blair Walsh kick), 0:34. Eagles 21–10. **Drive: 11 plays, 56 yards, 3:56.**

**Top passers**

- MIN – Sam Bradford – 24/41, 224 yards, TD, INT
- PHI – Carson Wentz – 16/28, 138 yards, TD, 2 INT

**Top rushers**

- MIN – Matt Asiata – 12 rushes, 55 yards
- PHI – Ryan Mathews – 14 rushes, 56 yards

**Top receivers**

- MIN – Cordarrelle Patterson – 7 receptions, 67 yards, TD
- PHI – Josh Huff – 4 receptions, 39 yards

This was the Eagles first blackout game of the year.

==== Week 8: at Dallas Cowboys ====
Week Eight: Philadelphia Eagles at Dallas Cowboys – Game summary

Quarter	1	2	3	4	OT	Total
Eagles	3	10	7	3	0	**23**
**Cowboys**	7	3	3	10	6	**29**

at AT&T Stadium, Arlington, Texas

- Date: October 30
- Game time: 8:30 p.m. EDT/7:30 p.m. CDT
- Game weather: 84 °F (29 °C), clear skies — retractable roof open
- Game attendance: 93,103
- Referee: Jerome Boger
- TV announcers (NBC): Al Michaels, Cris Collinsworth and Michele Tafoya
- Recap, Gamebook

Game information

**First quarter**

- PHI – Caleb Sturgis 30-yard field goal, 6:39. Eagles 3–0. **Drive: 10 plays, 50 yards, 5:11.**
- DAL – Dak Prescott 7-yard run (Dan Bailey kick), 4:41. Cowboys 7–3. **Drive: 5 plays, 75 yards, 1:58.**

**Second quarter**

- DAL – Dan Bailey 38-yard field goal, 14:50. Cowboys 10–3. **Drive: 8 plays, 52 yards, 3:20.**
- PHI – Ryan Mathews 1-yard run (Caleb Sturgis kick), 3:45. Tied 10–10. **Drive: 9 plays, 45 yards, 5:05.**
- PHI – Caleb Sturgis 55-yard field goal, 0:00. Eagles 13–10. **Drive: 8 plays, 43 yards, 1:26.**

**Third quarter**

- PHI – Jordan Matthews 5-yard pass from Carson Wentz (Caleb Sturgis kick), 6:20. Eagles 20–10. **Drive: 12 plays, 69 yards, 4:10.**
- DAL – Dan Bailey 23-yard field goal, 0:56. Eagles 20–13. **Drive: 12 plays, 70 yards, 5:24.**

**Fourth quarter**

- PHI – Caleb Sturgis 34-yard field goal, 14:09. Eagles 23–13. **Drive: 6 plays, 29 yards, 1:47.**
- DAL – Dan Bailey 49-yard field goal, 11:34. Eagles 23–16. **Drive: 4 plays, 5 yards, 1:24.**
- DAL – Dez Bryant 22-yard pass from Dak Prescott (Dan Bailey kick), 3:04. Tied 23–23. **Drive: 11 plays, 90 yards, 3:22.**

**Overtime**

- DAL – Jason Witten 5-yard pass from Dak Prescott, 7:48. Cowboys 29–23. **Drive: 12 plays, 75 yards, 7:12.**

**Top passers**

- PHI – Carson Wentz – 32/43, 202 yards, TD
- DAL – Dak Prescott – 19/39, 287 yards, 2 TD, INT

**Top rushers**

- PHI – Darren Sproles – 15 rushes, 86 yards
- DAL – Ezekiel Elliott – 22 rushes, 96 yards

**Top receivers**

- PHI – Jordan Matthews – 11 receptions, 65 yards, TD
- DAL – Dez Bryant – 4 receptions, 113 yards, TD

==== Week 9: at New York Giants ====
Week Nine: Philadelphia Eagles at New York Giants – Game summary

Quarter	1	2	3	4	Total
Eagles	3	7	7	6	**23**
**Giants**	14	7	7	0	**28**

at MetLife Stadium, East Rutherford, New Jersey

- Date: November 6
- Game time: 1:00 p.m. EST
- Game weather: 56 °F (13 °C), partly cloudy
- Game attendance: 80,309
- Referee: Bill Vinovich
- TV announcers (Fox): Joe Buck, Troy Aikman and Erin Andrews
- Recap, Gamebook

Game information

**First quarter**

- NYG – Odell Beckham Jr. 26-yard pass from Eli Manning (Robbie Gould kick), 12:27. Giants 7–0. **Drive: 2 plays, 31 yards, 0:50.**
- NYG – Roger Lewis 30-yard pass from Eli Manning (Robbie Gould kick), 9:43. Giants 14–0. **Drive: 3 plays, 30 yards, 1:12.**
- PHI – Caleb Sturgis 34-yard field goal, 5:51. Eagles 14–3. **Drive: 10 plays, 59 yards, 3:52.**

**Second quarter**

- PHI – Ryan Mathews 8-yard rush (Caleb Sturgis kick), 12:11. Giants 14–10. **Drive: 3 plays, 70 yards, 1:33.**
- NYG – Odell Beckham Jr. 1-yard pass from Eli Manning (Robbie Gould kick), 9:28. Giants 21–10. **Drive: 6 plays, 86 yards, 2:43.**

**Third quarter**

- PHI – Kenjon Barner 3-yard rush (Caleb Sturgis kick), 12:17. Giants 21–17. **Drive: 6 plays, 70 yards, 2:43.**
- NYG – Sterling Shepard 32-yard pass from Eli Manning (Robbie Gould kick), 7:41. Giants 28–17. **Drive: 10 plays, 75 yards, 4:36.**

**Fourth quarter**

- PHI – Caleb Sturgis 26-yard field goal, 12:01. Giants 28–20. **Drive: 14 plays, 80 yards, 7:26.**
- PHI – Caleb Sturgis 38-yard field goal, 3:51. Giants 28–23. **Drive: 8 plays, 26 yards, 3:12.**

**Top passers**

- PHI – Carson Wentz – 27/47, 364 yards, 2 INT
- NYG – Eli Manning – 22/36, 257 yards, 4 TD, 2 INT

**Top rushers**

- PHI – Darren Sproles – 13 rushes, 57 yards
- NYG – Paul Perkins – 11 rushes, 32 yards

**Top receivers**

- PHI – Zach Ertz – 8 receptions, 97 yards
- NYG – Sterling Shepard – 3 receptions, 50 yards, TD

After a heartbreaking overtime loss in Dallas, the Eagles traveled to MetLife Stadium to take on the Giants. The Eagles started off slow. Wentz threw 2 interceptions and the defense allowed 2 touchdowns by Eli Manning to Odell Beckham Jr and to Roger Lewis. The Eagles defense struggled all day especially Leodis McKelvin until the 4th quarter when the Eagles intercepted Manning twice. But, they weren't able to comeback as the Eagles failed to score a touchdown. The loss dropped the Eagles to 4–4 and 4th place in the NFC East. After this loss, the Eagles would not lose to New York again until Week 10 of 2020 (November 15, 2020), after 8 consecutive wins.

==== Week 10: vs. Atlanta Falcons ====
Week Ten: Atlanta Falcons at Philadelphia Eagles – Game summary

Quarter	1	2	3	4	Total
Falcons	0	6	3	6	**15**
**Eagles**	7	0	3	14	**24**

at Lincoln Financial Field, Philadelphia, Pennsylvania

- Date: November 13
- Game time: 1:00 p.m. EST
- Game weather: 58 °F (14 °C), sunny
- Game attendance: 69,596
- Referee: Craig Wrolstad
- TV announcers (Fox): Kevin Burkhardt, John Lynch and Pam Oliver
- Recap, Gamebook

Game information

**First quarter**

- PHI – Ryan Mathews 4-yard run (Caleb Sturgis kick), 4:17. Eagles 7–0. **Drive: 12 plays, 81 yards, 7:14.**

**Second quarter**

- ATL – Matt Bryant 38-yard field goal, 9:36. Eagles 7–3. **Drive: 6 plays, 46 yards, 3:04.**
- ATL – Matt Bryant 43-yard field goal, 2:59. Eagles 7–6. **Drive: 9 plays, 50 yards, 4:36.**

**Third quarter**

- PHI – Caleb Sturgis 29-yard field goal, 8:16. Eagles 10–6. **Drive: 14 plays, 70 yards, 6:44.**
- ATL – Matt Bryant 46-yard field goal, 4:46. Eagles 10–9. **Drive: 8 plays, 47 yards, 3:30.**

**Fourth quarter**

- PHI – Caleb Sturgis 25-yard field goal, 13:50. Eagles 13–9. **Drive: 10 plays, 59 yards, 5:56.**
- ATL – Taylor Gabriel 76-yard pass from Matt Ryan (kick failed, hit left upright), 13:15. Falcons 15–13. **Drive: 2 plays, 75 yards, 0:35.**
- PHI – Ryan Mathews 5-yard run (Ryan Mathews run), 6:49. Eagles 21–15. **Drive: 8 plays, 76 yards, 3:36.**
- PHI – Caleb Sturgis 48-yard field goal, 1:57. Eagles 24–15. **Drive: 4 plays, 8 yards, 0:22.**

**Top passers**

- ATL – Matt Ryan – 18/31, 267 yards, TD, INT
- PHI – Carson Wentz – 25/36, 231 yards

**Top rushers**

- ATL – Devonta Freeman – 12 rushes, 49 yards
- PHI – Ryan Mathews: 18 rushes, 108 yards, 2 TD

**Top receivers**

- ATL – Julio Jones – 10 receptions, 134 yards
- PHI – Jordan Matthews – 6 receptions, 73 yards

==== Week 11: at Seattle Seahawks ====
Week Eleven: Philadelphia Eagles at Seattle Seahawks – Game summary

Quarter	1	2	3	4	Total
Eagles	0	7	0	8	**15**
**Seahawks**	6	10	7	3	**26**

at CenturyLink Field, Seattle, Washington

- Date: November 20
- Game time: 4:25 p.m. EST/1:25 p.m. PST
- Game weather: 54 °F (12 °C), rain
- Game attendance: 69,190
- Referee: Carl Cheffers
- TV announcers (CBS): Jim Nantz, Phil Simms and Tracy Wolfson
- Recap, Gamebook

Game information

**First quarter**

- SEA – C. J. Prosise 72-yard run (kick blocked), 11:02. Seahawks 6–0. **Drive: 2 plays, 80 yards, 0:48.**

**Second quarter**

- PHI – Zach Ertz 4-yard pass from Carson Wentz (Caleb Sturgis kick), 14:13. Eagles 7–6. **Drive: 13 plays, 68 yards, 7:35.**
- SEA – Jimmy Graham 35-yard pass from Russell Wilson (Steven Hauschka kick), 8:20. Seahawks 13–7. **Drive: 10 plays, 92 yards, 5:53.**
- SEA – Steven Hauschka 21-yard field goal, 3:47. Seahawks 16–7. **Drive: 6 plays, 74 yards, 1:45.**

**Third quarter**

- SEA – Russell Wilson 15-yard pass from Doug Baldwin (Steven Hauschka kick), 7:31. Seahawks 23–7. **Drive: 6 plays, 59 yards, 2:16.**

**Fourth quarter**

- SEA – Steven Hauschka 35-yard field goal, 13:34. Seahawks 26–7. **Drive: 8 plays, 24 yards, 2:42.**
- PHI – Dorial Green-Beckham 5-yard pass from Carson Wentz (Carson Wentz–Nelson Agholor pass), 3:42. Seahawks 26–15. **Drive: 10 plays, 66 yards, 3:33.**

**Top passers**

- PHI – Carson Wentz – 23/45, 218 yards, 2 TD, 2 INT
- SEA – Russell Wilson – 18/31, 272 yards, TD

**Top rushers**

- PHI – Wendell Smallwood – 13 rushes, 48 yards
- SEA – C. J. Prosise – 4 rushes, 76 yards, TD

**Top receivers**

- PHI – Jordan Matthews – 5 receptions, 59 yards
- SEA – Doug Baldwin – 4 receptions, 104 yards

==== Week 12: vs. Green Bay Packers ====
Week Twelve: Green Bay Packers at Philadelphia Eagles – Game summary

Quarter	1	2	3	4	Total
**Packers**	7	7	3	10	**27**
Eagles	7	3	3	0	**13**

at Lincoln Financial Field, Philadelphia, Pennsylvania

- Date: November 28
- Game time: 8:30 p.m. EST
- Game weather: 47 °F (8 °C), cloudy
- Game attendance: 69,596
- Referee: Terry McAulay
- TV announcers (ESPN): Sean McDonough, Jon Gruden and Lisa Salters
- Recap, Gamebook

Game information

**First quarter**

- GB – Davante Adams 12-yard pass from Aaron Rodgers (Mason Crosby kick), 9:56. Packers 7–0. **Drive: 10 plays, 75 yards, 5:09.**
- PHI – Carson Wentz 1-yard run (Caleb Sturgis kick), 3:49. 7–7. **Drive: 11 plays, 81 yards, 6:11.**

**Second quarter**

- GB – Davante Adams 20-yard pass from Aaron Rodgers (Mason Crosby kick), 15:00. Packers 14–7. **Drive: 9 plays, 75 yards, 3:47.**
- PHI – Caleb Sturgis 48-yard field goal, 0:20. Packers 14–10. **Drive: 13 plays, 69 yards, 3:03.**

**Third quarter**

- GB – Mason Crosby 33-yard field goal, 8:51. Packers 17–10. **Drive: 5 plays, 57 yards, 2:32.**
- PHI – Caleb Sturgis 50-yard field goal, 5:26. Packers 17–13. **Drive: 11 plays, 43 yards, 3:27.**

**Fourth quarter**

- GB – Aaron Ripkowski 1-yard run (Mason Crosby kick), 13:56. Packers 24–13. **Drive: 13 plays, 75 yards, 6:28.**
- GB – Mason Crosby 32-yard field goal, 2:00. Packers 27–13. **Drive: 17 plays, 78 yards, 8:21.**

**Top passers**

- GB – Aaron Rodgers – 30/39, 313 yards, 2 TD
- PHI – Carson Wentz – 24/36, 254 yards, INT

**Top rushers**

- GB – James Starks – 17 rushes, 41 yards
- PHI – Wendell Smallwood – 9 rushes, 37 yards

**Top receivers**

- GB – Davante Adams – 5 receptions, 113 yards, 2 TD
- PHI – Dorial Green-Beckham – 6 receptions, 82 yards

==== Week 13: at Cincinnati Bengals ====
Week Thirteen: Philadelphia Eagles at Cincinnati Bengals – Game summary

Quarter	1	2	3	4	Total
Eagles	0	0	7	7	**14**
**Bengals**	10	9	10	3	**32**

at Paul Brown Stadium, Cincinnati, Ohio

- Date: December 4
- Game time: 1:00 p.m. EST
- Game weather: 42 °F (6 °C), cloudy
- Game attendance: 55,456
- Referee: Jeff Triplette
- TV announcers (Fox): Thom Brennaman, Charles Davis and Peter Schrager
- Recap, Gamebook

Game information

**First quarter**

- CIN – Mike Nugent 32-yard field goal, 10:22. Bengals 3–0. **Drive: 8 plays, 39 yards, 3:43.**
- CIN – Jeremy Hill 2-yard run (Mike Nugent kick), 1:32. Bengals 10–0. **Drive: 8 plays, 81 yards, 4:12.**

**Second quarter**

- CIN – Mike Nugent 33-yard field goal, 6:23. Bengals 13–0. **Drive: 7 plays, 44 yards, 2:46.**
- CIN – Tyler Eifert 13-yard pass from Andy Dalton (kick failed, wide right), 0:07. Bengals 19–0. **Drive: 12 plays, 93 yards, 3:07.**

**Third quarter**

- CIN – Brandon LaFell 8-yard pass from Andy Dalton (Mike Nugent kick), 11:21. Bengals 26–0. **Drive: 8 plays, 77 yards, 3:39.**
- CIN – Mike Nugent 26-yard field goal, 4:07. Bengals 29–0. **Drive: 10 plays, 78 yards, 4:53.**
- PHI – Zach Ertz 13-yard pass from Carson Wentz (Caleb Sturgis kick), 2:30. Bengals 29–7. **Drive: 6 plays, 38 yards, 1:37.**

**Fourth quarter**

- PHI – Darren Sproles 2-yard run (Caleb Sturgis kick), 6:53. Bengals 29–14. **Drive: 15 plays, 61 yards, 6:04.**
- CIN – Mike Nugent 38-yard field goal, 2:50. Bengals 32–14. **Drive: 4 plays, 0 yards, 1:02.**

**Top passers**

- PHI – Carson Wentz – 36/60, 308 yards, TD, 3 INT
- CIN – Andy Dalton – 23/31, 332 yards, 2 TD

**Top rushers**

- PHI – Wendell Smallwood – 8 rushes, 19 yards
- CIN – Rex Burkhead – 8 rushes, 38 yards

**Top receivers**

- PHI – Paul Turner – 6 receptions, 80 yards
- CIN – Brandon LaFell – 5 receptions, 95 yards, TD

With the loss, the Eagles fell to 5–7. They also fell to 0-4-1 all time in Cincinnati.

==== Week 14: vs. Washington Redskins ====
Week Fourteen: Washington Redskins at Philadelphia Eagles – Game summary

Quarter	1	2	3	4	Total
**Redskins**	0	7	14	6	**27**
Eagles	3	10	0	9	**22**

at Lincoln Financial Field, Philadelphia, Pennsylvania

- Date: December 11
- Game time: 1:00 p.m. EST
- Game weather: 35 °F (2 °C), cloudy
- Game attendance: 69,596
- Referee: Tony Corrente
- TV announcers (Fox): Kevin Burkhardt, John Lynch and Pam Oliver
- Recap, Gamebook

Game information

**First quarter**

- PHI – Caleb Sturgis 45-yard field goal, 9:46. Eagles 3–0. **Drive: 10 plays, 46 yards, 5:14.**

**Second quarter**

- PHI – Caleb Sturgis 36-yard field goal, 10:29. Eagles 6–0. **Drive: 10 plays, 53 yards, 5:36.**
- WAS – Robert Kelley 22-yard run (Dustin Hopkins kick), 4:11. Redskins 7–6. **Drive: 10 plays, 69 yards, 6:18.**
- PHI – Darren Sproles 4-yard pass from Carson Wentz (Caleb Sturgis kick), 0:28. Eagles 13–7. **Drive: 12 plays, 77 yards, 3:43.**

**Third quarter**

- WAS – DeSean Jackson 80-yard pass from Kirk Cousins (Dustin Hopkins kick), 9:14. Redskins 14–13. **Drive: 2 plays, 81 yards, 0:43.**
- WAS – Pierre Garçon 15-yard pass from Kirk Cousins (Dustin Hopkins kick), 0:07. Redskins 21–13. **Drive: 6 plays, 54 yards, 3:14.**

**Fourth quarter**

- PHI – Leodis McKelvin 29-yard interception return (pass failed), 13:11. Redskins 21–19.
- PHI – Caleb Sturgis 41-yard field goal, 4:59. Eagles 22–21. **Drive: 11 plays, 37 yards, 6:28.**
- WAS – Chris Thompson 25-yard run (pass failed), 1:53. Redskins 27–22. **Drive: 8 plays, 77 yards, 3:06.**

**Top passers**

- WAS – Kirk Cousins – 14/21, 234 yards, 2 TD, INT
- PHI – Carson Wentz – 32/46, 314 yards, TD, INT

**Top rushers**

- WAS – Robert Kelley – 16 rushes, 63 yards, TD
- PHI – Ryan Mathews – 15 rushes, 60 yards

**Top receivers**

- WAS – DeSean Jackson – 3 receptions, 102 yards, TD
- PHI – Zach Ertz – 10 receptions, 112 yards

==== Week 15: at Baltimore Ravens ====
Week Fifteen: Philadelphia Eagles at Baltimore Ravens – Game summary

Quarter	1	2	3	4	Total
Eagles	3	11	0	12	**26**
**Ravens**	10	10	0	7	**27**

at M&T Bank Stadium, Baltimore, Maryland

- Date: December 18
- Game time: 1:00 p.m. EST
- Game weather: 62 °F (17 °C), cloudy
- Game attendance: 71,223
- Referee: Craig Wrolstad
- TV announcers (Fox): Kenny Albert, Daryl Johnston and Laura Okmin
- Recap, Gamebook

Game information

**First quarter**

- BAL – Kamar Aiken 5-yard pass from Joe Flacco (Justin Tucker kick), 11:38. Ravens 7–0. **Drive: 5 plays, 36 yards, 1:54.**
- PHI – Caleb Sturgis 45-yard field goal, 4:42. Ravens 7–3. **Drive: 6 plays, 16 yards, 2:47.**
- BAL – Justin Tucker 53-yard field goal, 1:55. Ravens 10–3. **Drive: 7 plays, 53 yards, 2:47.**

**Second quarter**

- PHI – Ryan Mathews 4-yard run (Ryan Mathews run), 14:38. Eagles 11–10. **Drive: 1 play, 8 yards, 0:06.**
- BAL – Justin Tucker 47-yard field goal, 9:21. Ravens 13–11. **Drive: 10 plays, 47 yards, 5:17.**
- PHI – Caleb Sturgis 34-yard field goal, 1:39. Eagles 14–13. **Drive: 17 plays, 59 yards, 7:42.**
- BAL – Steve Smith Sr. 34-yard pass from Joe Flacco (Justin Tucker kick), 0:09. Ravens 20–14. **Drive: 8 plays, 65 yards, 1:30.**

**Third quarter**

- No scoring plays

**Fourth quarter**

- PHI – Caleb Sturgis 27-yard field goal, 14:48. Ravens 20–17. **Drive: 13 plays, 79 yards, 6:59.**
- BAL – Kenneth Dixon 16-yard run (Justin Tucker kick), 11:06. Ravens 27–17. **Drive: 8 plays, 69 yards, 3:42.**
- PHI – Caleb Sturgis 29-yard field goal, 2:22. Ravens 27–20. **Drive: 11 plays, 49 yards, 3:50.**
- PHI – Carson Wentz 4-yard run (pass failed), 0:04. Ravens 27–26. **Drive: 9 plays, 59 yards, 1:35.**

**Top passers**

- PHI – Carson Wentz – 22/42, 170 yards, INT
- BAL – Joe Flacco – 16/30, 206 yards, 2 TD, INT

**Top rushers**

- PHI – Ryan Mathews – 13 rushes, 77 yards
- BAL – Terrance West – 20 rushes, 128 yards, TD

**Top receivers**

- PHI – Zach Ertz – 6 receptions, 80 yards
- BAL – Mike Wallace – 2 receptions, 60 yards

The loss knocked the Eagles out of playoff contention for the third consecutive year. Despite a rushing touchdown by Carson Wentz in the final seconds, they failed the 2-point conversion; sealing a fifth straight loss and a playoff elimination.

==== Week 16: vs. New York Giants ====
Week Sixteen: New York Giants at Philadelphia Eagles – Game summary

Quarter	1	2	3	4	Total
Giants	3	10	3	3	**19**
**Eagles**	14	7	0	3	**24**

at Lincoln Financial Field, Philadelphia, Pennsylvania

- Date: December 22
- Game time: 8:30 p.m. EST
- Game weather: 40 °F (4 °C), partly cloudy
- Game attendance: 69,596
- Referee: Clete Blakeman
- TV announcers (NBC/NFLN/Twitter): Mike Tirico, Cris Collinsworth and Heather Cox
- Recap, Gamebook

Game information

**First quarter**

- PHI – Darren Sproles 25-yard run (Caleb Sturgis kick), 9:48. Eagles 7–0. **Drive: 7 plays, 78 yards, 4:13.**
- PHI – Malcolm Jenkins 34-yard interception return (Caleb Sturgis kick), 8:20. Eagles 14–0.
- NYG – Robbie Gould 35-yard field goal, 0:10. Eagles 14–3. **Drive: 12 plays, 80 yards, 5:48.**

**Second quarter**

- NYG – Robbie Gould 35-yard field goal, 7:28. Eagles 14–6. **Drive: 9 plays, 39 yards, 4:00.**
- PHI – Nelson Agholor 40-yard pass from Carson Wentz (Caleb Sturgis kick), 4:59. Eagles 21–6. **Drive: 5 plays, 75 yards, 2:29.**
- NYG – Sterling Shepard 13-yard pass from Eli Manning (Robbie Gould kick), 0:33. Eagles 21–13. **Drive: 12 plays, 84 yards, 4:26.**

**Third quarter**

- NYG – Robbie Gould 29-yard field goal, 9:09. Eagles 21–16. **Drive: 10 plays, 56 yards, 4:08.**

**Fourth quarter**

- PHI – Caleb Sturgis 41-yard field goal, 8:47. Eagles 24–16. **Drive: 7 plays, 33 yards, 3:10.**
- NYG – Robbie Gould 41-yard field goal, 5:17. Eagles 24–19. **Drive: 10 plays, 52 yards, 3:30.**

**Top passers**

- NYG – Eli Manning – 38/63, 356 yards, TD, 3 INT
- PHI – Carson Wentz – 13/24, 152 yards, TD, INT

**Top rushers**

- NYG – Paul Perkins – 15 rushes, 68 yards
- PHI – Ryan Mathews – 18 rushes, 46 yards

**Top receivers**

- NYG – Odell Beckham Jr. – 11 receptions, 150 yards
- PHI – Nelson Agholor – 2 receptions, 47 yards

After a heartbreaking loss that knocked the Eagles out of the playoffs, they came back home to square off the New York Giants for round 2. Prior to this game, the Eagles were 0–4 against division rivals. Playing with pride, the Eagles knocked off the Giants including a pick 6 by Malcolm Jenkins. With the win, the Eagles snapped their 5-game losing streak and won against the Giants at home for the 3rd consecutive season. The win allowed the Cowboys to clinch the NFC East. This started an 8-game winning streak for the Eagles against the Giants, ending Week 10 of 2020.

==== Week 17: vs. Dallas Cowboys ====
Week Seventeen: Dallas Cowboys at Philadelphia Eagles – Game summary

Quarter	1	2	3	4	Total
Cowboys	0	10	3	0	**13**
**Eagles**	3	7	7	10	**27**

at Lincoln Financial Field, Philadelphia, Pennsylvania

- Date: January 1, 2017
- Game time: 1:00 p.m. EST
- Game weather: 50 °F (10 °C), sunny
- Game attendance: 69,596
- Referee: Walt Coleman
- TV announcers (Fox): Kevin Burkhardt, John Lynch and Pam Oliver
- Recap, Gamebook

Game information

**First quarter**

- PHI – Caleb Sturgis 22-yard field goal, 3:57. Eagles 3–0. **Drive: 14 plays, 79 yards, 8:18.**

**Second quarter**

- DAL – Dan Bailey 49-yard field goal, 14:51. Tied 3–3. **Drive: 9 plays, 44 yards, 4:06.**
- DAL – Terrance Williams 3-yard pass from Tony Romo (Dan Bailey kick), 10:11. Cowboys 10–3. **Drive: 6 plays, 81 yards, 2:49.**
- PHI – Zach Ertz 6-yard pass from Carson Wentz (Caleb Sturgis kick), 0:07. Tied 10–10. **Drive: 9 plays, 49 yards, 1:50.**

**Third quarter**

- DAL – Dan Bailey 23-yard field goal, 9:18. Cowboys 13–10. **Drive: 7 plays, 66 yards, 3:21.**
- PHI – Zach Ertz 20-yard pass from Carson Wentz (Caleb Sturgis kick), 4:56. Eagles 17–13. **Drive: 10 plays, 89 yards, 4:22.**

**Fourth quarter**

- PHI – Caleb Sturgis 33-yard field goal, 2:18. Eagles 20–13. **Drive: 14 plays, 75 yards, 7:51.**
- PHI – Terrell Watson 1-yard run (Caleb Sturgis kick), 1:23. Eagles 27–13. **Drive: 3 plays, 7 yards, 0:16.**

**Top passers**

- DAL – Mark Sanchez – 9/17, 85 yards, 2 INT
- PHI – Carson Wentz – 27/43, 245 yards, 2 TD

**Top rushers**

- DAL – Darren McFadden – 7 rushes, 28 yards
- PHI – Byron Marshall – 10 rushes, 42 yards

**Top receivers**

- DAL – Cole Beasley – 3 receptions, 49 yards
- PHI – Zach Ertz – 13 receptions, 139 yards, 2 TD

With the win, the Eagles finished the year at 7–9. Furthermore, they won their first game against the Cowboys at Lincoln Financial Field since 2011.

== Standings ==
=== Division ===
NFC East
	W	L	T	PCT	DIV	CONF	PF	PA	STK
^{(1)} Dallas Cowboys	13	3	0	.813	3–3	9–3	421	306	L1
^{(5)} New York Giants	11	5	0	.688	4–2	8–4	310	284	W1
Washington Redskins	8	7	1	.531	3–3	6–6	396	383	L1
Philadelphia Eagles	7	9	0	.438	2–4	5–7	367	331	W2

=== Conference ===
NFC
#	Team	Division	W	L	T	PCT	DIV	CONF	SOS	SOV	STK
Division leaders
1	Dallas Cowboys	East	13	3	0	.813	3–3	9–3	.471	.440	L1
2	Atlanta Falcons	South	11	5	0	.688	5–1	9–3	.480	.452	W4
3	Seattle Seahawks	West	10	5	1	.656	3–2–1	6–5–1	.441	.425	W1
4	Green Bay Packers	North	10	6	0	.625	5–1	8–4	.508	.453	W6
Wild Cards
5	New York Giants	East	11	5	0	.688	4–2	8–4	.486	.455	W1
6 (Note: Detroit finished ahead of Tampa Bay for the No. 6 seed and qualified for the last playoff spot based on record vs. common opponents—Detroit's cumulative record against Chicago, Dallas, Los Angeles and New Orleans was 3–2, while Tampa Bay's cumulative record against the same four teams was 2–3.)	Detroit Lions	North	9	7	0	.563	3–3	7–5	.475	.392	L3
Did not qualify for the postseason
7	Tampa Bay Buccaneers	South	9	7	0	.563	4–2	7–5	.492	.434	W1
8	Washington Redskins	East	8	7	1	.531	3–3	6–6	.516	.430	L1
9	Minnesota Vikings	North	8	8	0	.500	2–4	5–7	.492	.457	W1
10	Arizona Cardinals	West	7	8	1	.469	4–1–1	6–5–1	.463	.366	W2
11 (Note: New Orleans finished ahead of Philadelphia based on better record vs. conference opponents.)	New Orleans Saints	South	7	9	0	.438	2–4	6–6	.523	.393	L1
12	Philadelphia Eagles	East	7	9	0	.438	2–4	5–7	.559	.518	W2
13	Carolina Panthers	South	6	10	0	.375	1–5	5–7	.518	.354	L2
14	Los Angeles Rams	West	4	12	0	.250	2–4	3–9	.504	.500	L7
15	Chicago Bears	North	3	13	0	.188	2–4	3–9	.521	.396	L4
16	San Francisco 49ers	West	2	14	0	.125	2–4	2–10	.504	.250	L1
Tiebreakers (Note: When breaking ties for three or more teams under the NFL's rules, they are first broken within divisions, then comparing only the highest-ranked remaining team from each division.)
