= Eastern Christian Academy =

Private Christian school in Elkton, Maryland, US

Eastern Christian Academy was a private Christian school with a football training program located in Elkton, Maryland. Established in 2012, it enrolled students in grades 6 through 12 participating in an online curriculum administered by Connections Academy. The school was founded by Delaware-based commercial contractor David Sills IV, whose goal was to use athletics to provide opportunities for at-risk students to get financial aid and a college education.

Virtually all of the students enrolled were boys, all of whom were on the football team, whose mascot was the honey badger, named after the viral video. The Maryland Public Secondary Schools Athletic Association initially refused to sanction Eastern Christian Academy, causing many of their opponents to drop them from their 2012 schedule. The Maryland State Department of Education voiced concerns with the school including the power and influence of the football program at the school. In 2013, their schedule included regional powers Calvert Hall College High School, St. Edward High School (Lakewood, Ohio), Saint Ignatius High School (Cleveland), and St. Peter's Preparatory School. The team posted a 9–3 record, finishing number 9 in the Maryland/Washington D.C. rankings. According to sports website MaxPreps, the Honey Badgers played the toughest schedule in the country in 2014. Their record was 3–9. Eastern Christian Academy ended the 2015 season with a 2–6 record. The school closed its doors prior to the start of the 2016 football season.

== Notable attendees ==
- David Sills V, West Virginia University wide receiver
- Wendell Smallwood, Philadelphia Eagles running back
- Brandon Rusnak, Jacksonville Jaguars cornerback
