= C. J. Smith =

C. J. Smith may refer to:

- C. J. Smith (American football) (born 1993), American football cornerback
- C. J. Smith (ice hockey) (born 1994), American ice hockey left winger
- C. J. Smith (soccer) (born 1998), Canadian soccer player
