= Brandon Rusnak =

American football player (born 1995)

Profile
- Position: Cornerback

Personal information
- Born: July 11, 1995 (age 31); Wilmington, Delaware, U.S.
- Listed height: 5 ft 11 in (1.80 m)
- Listed weight: 198 lb (90 kg)

Career information
- High school: Eastern Christian Academy (Elkton, Maryland)
- College: Michigan
- NFL draft: 2019: undrafted

Career history
- Jacksonville Jaguars (2019–2021); Arlington Renegades (2023–2024)

Awards and highlights
- XFL champion (2023)

Career NFL statistics
- Total tackles: 30
- Stats at Pro Football Reference

Brandon Rusnak (born Brandon Watson, July 11, 1995) is an American football cornerback. He played college football for University of Michigan.

== Professional career ==
=== Jacksonville Jaguars ===
Rusnak signed with the Jacksonville Jaguars as an undrafted free agent after he was not selected in the 2019 NFL draft. He was later signed to the practice squad before being promoted to the active roster.

On August 31, 2021, Rusnak was waived by the Jaguars and re-signed to the practice squad the next day. He was promoted to the active roster on December 28.

On August 29, 2022, Rusnak was waived by the Jaguars.

=== Arlington Renegades ===
Rusnak signed with the Arlington Renegades of the XFL on March 7, 2023. He re-signed with the team on January 22, 2024. Rusnak was released on May 1.

== Personal ==
Rusnak was born Brandon Watson, but legally changed his name to Brandon Rusnak in November 2020.
