= Wendell Smallwood =

American football player (born 1994)

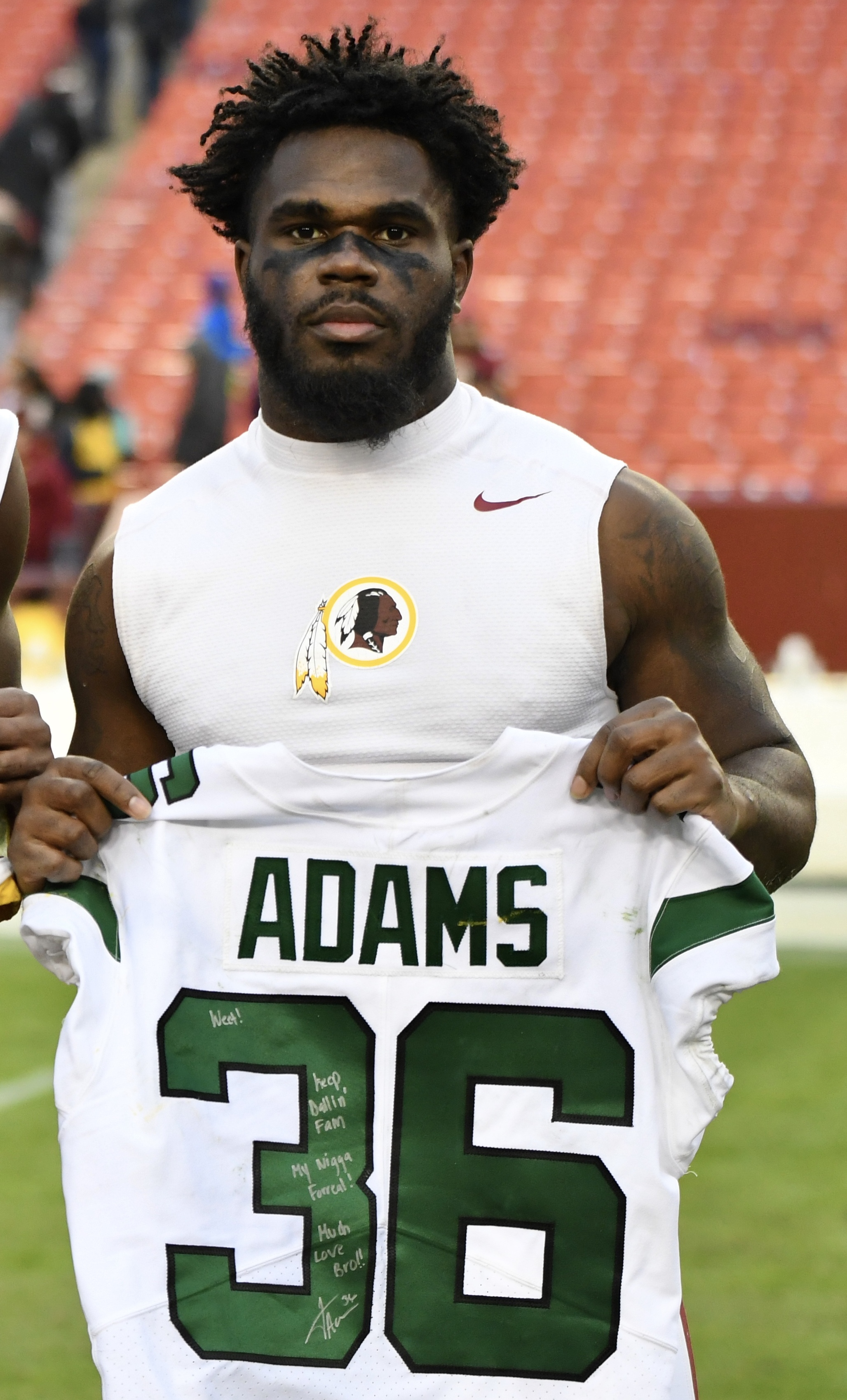
- Smallwood with the Washington Redskins in 2019, holding Josh Adams's jersey

No. 28, 34, 29, 38,4
- Position: Running back

Personal information
- Born: January 20, 1994 (age 32); Wilmington, Delaware, U.S.
- Listed height: 5 ft 10 in (1.78 m)
- Listed weight: 208 lb (94 kg)

Career information
- High school: Eastern Christian Academy (Elkton, Maryland)
- College: West Virginia
- NFL draft: 2016: 5th round, 153rd overall pick

Career history
- Philadelphia Eagles (2016–2018); Washington Redskins (2019); Pittsburgh Steelers (2020); Jacksonville Jaguars (2021)*; Washington Football Team (2021)
- * Offseason or practice squad member only

Awards and highlights
- Super Bowl champion (LII); Second-team All-Big 12 (2015)

Career NFL statistics
- Rushing yards: 956
- Rushing average: 4.0
- Receptions: 60
- Receiving yards: 474
- Return yards: 401
- Total touchdowns: 8
- Stats at Pro Football Reference

Wendell Lynn Smallwood Jr. (born January 20, 1994) is an American former professional football player who was a running back in the National Football League (NFL). He played college football for the West Virginia Mountaineers and was selected in the fifth round of the 2016 NFL draft by the Philadelphia Eagles. Smallwood was also a member of the Washington Redskins, Pittsburgh Steelers, and Jacksonville Jaguars.

== Early life ==
Smallwood attended Red Lion Christian Academy in Bear, Delaware, before transferring to Eastern Christian Academy in Elkton, Maryland, for his senior year. He was rated by Rivals.com as a three-star recruit. He received offers from West Virginia, Boston College, Connecticut, Hawaii, Rutgers, and Temple. He chose to commit to West Virginia University (WVU) to play college football.

== College career ==
As a true freshman at West Virginia in 2013, Smallwood played in 12 games and rushed for 221 yards on 39 carries with one touchdown. He also served as a kick returner, returning 30 kickoffs for a total of 541 yards. As a sophomore, he played in all 13 games and made nine starts. He had 722 rushing yards on 148 carries and two touchdowns. He also recorded 31 receptions, fifth most in school history for a single season. As a junior in 2015, Smallwood rushed for a Big 12 Conference-leading 1,519 yards on 238 carries with nine touchdowns. With 2,462 rushing yards in his collegiate career, he finished ninth in school history. After the season, he decided to forego his senior season and entered the 2016 NFL draft. While at West Virginia, he majored in criminology with a minor in communications.

=== Career statistics ===
Season	Team	GP	GS	Rushing					Receiving				
Season	Team	GP	GS	Att	Yds	Avg	Lng	TD	Rec	Yds	Avg	Lng	TD
2013	WVU	12	1	39	221	5.7	38	1	11	132	12.0	30	0
2014	WVU	13	9	148	722	4.9	35	2	31	326	10.5	50	0
2015	WVU	13	12	238	1,519	6.4	52	9	26	160	6.2	15	0
Career		38	22	425	2,462	5.8	52	12	68	618	9.1	50	0

== Professional career ==
Pre-draft measurables
Height	Weight	Arm length	Hand span	Wingspan	40-yard dash	10-yard split	20-yard split	20-yard shuttle	Three-cone drill	Vertical jump	Broad jump	Bench press
5 ft 10 1/2 in (1.79 m)	208 lb (94 kg)	30 1/2 in (0.77 m)	9 1/4 in (0.23 m)	6 ft 2 5/8 in (1.90 m)	4.41 s	1.53 s	2.59 s	4.28 s	6.83 s	33.5 in (0.85 m)	10 ft 0 in (3.05 m)	18 reps
All values from NFL Combine/Pro Day

=== Philadelphia Eagles ===
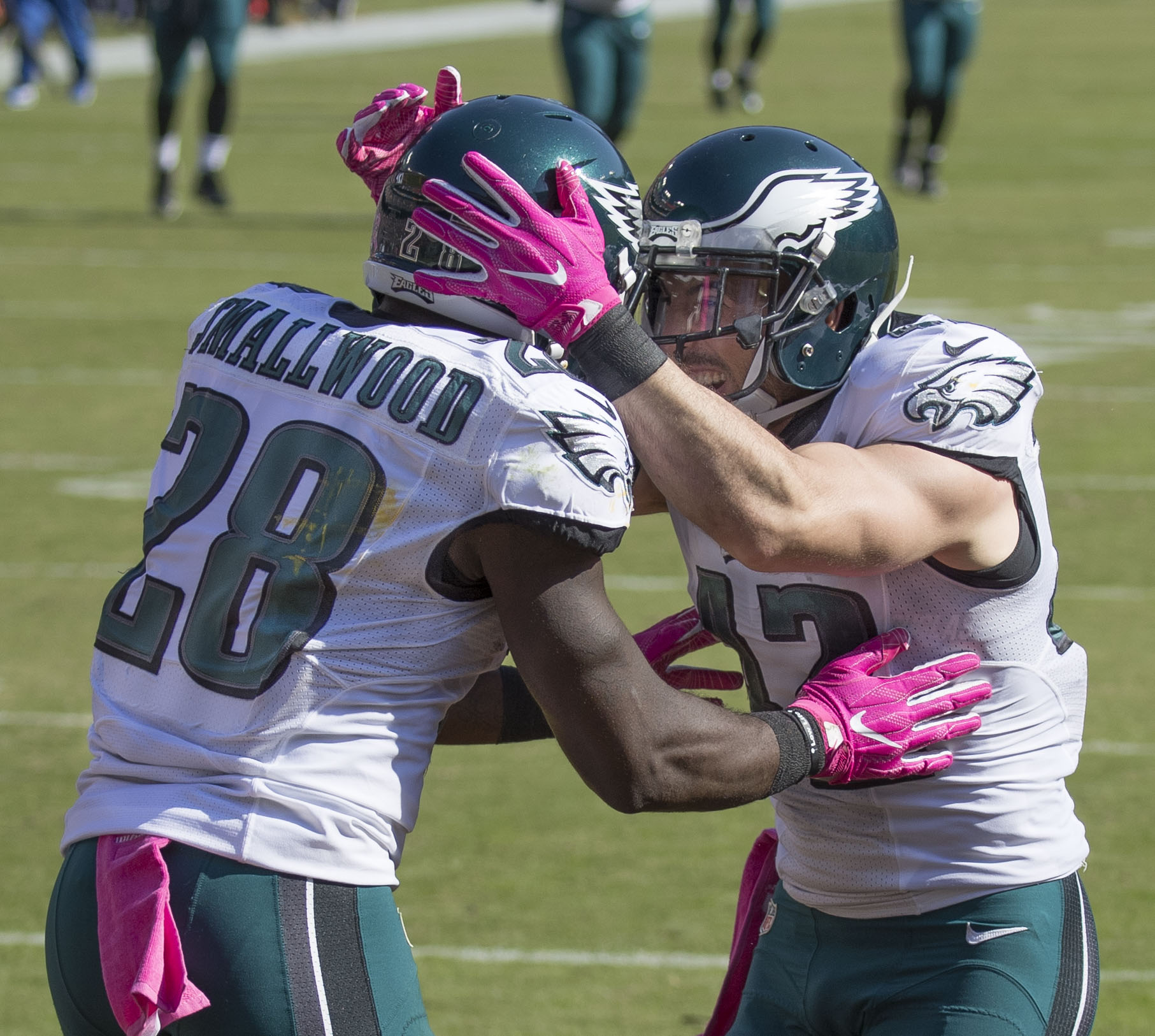
Smallwood (left) celebrates a touchdown with teammate Chris Maragos

Smallwood was selected by the Philadelphia Eagles in the fifth round of the 2016 NFL draft with the 153rd overall pick. He signed his rookie four-year contract on May 4, 2016.

On September 25, 2016, Smallwood scored his first career rushing touchdown in a 34–3 win against the Pittsburgh Steelers. Due to an ankle injury limiting starter Ryan Mathews to only two carries, Smallwood was the featured back for the Eagles, recording 89 yards and the touchdown on 17 carries. In Week 6 against the Washington Redskins, he scored his first kickoff return touchdown and the NFL's first kickoff return touchdown of the season. He was placed on injured reserve on December 12, 2016, finishing his rookie season with 312 rushing yards and a touchdown.

In the 2017 season, Smallwood finished with 174 rushing yards, one rushing touchdown, 13 receptions, and 103 receiving yards. During his second year in the NFL, the Eagles defeated the New England Patriots by a score of 41–33, giving them their first Super Bowl championship in franchise history.

In the 2018 season, Smallwood continued to share a deep backfield. In Week 3, he scored his first rushing touchdown of the season against the Indianapolis Colts. Overall, he finished the 2018 season with 364 rushing yards, three rushing touchdowns, 28 receptions, 230 receiving yards, and two receiving touchdowns. The Eagles made the playoffs as the #6-seed. In the Wild Card Round against the Chicago Bears, he had 20 rushing yards and 20 receiving yards in the 16–15 victory. In the Divisional Round against the New Orleans Saints, he had 33 rushing yards and a six-yard reception in the 20–14 loss.

Smallwood was waived during final roster cuts on August 31, 2019.

=== Washington Redskins (first stint) ===
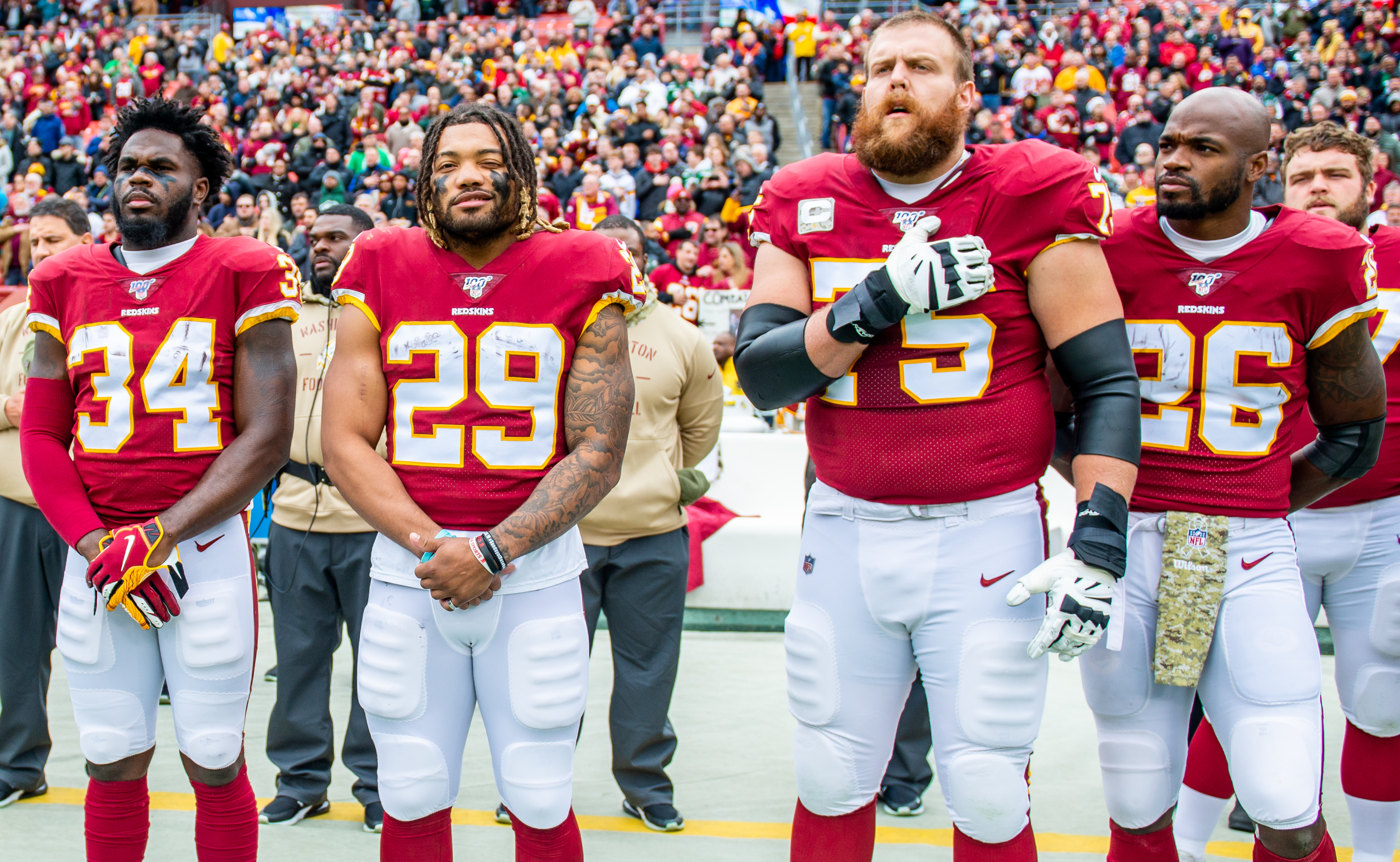
Smallwood alongside his teammates in a game against the New York Jets

On September 1, 2019, Smallwood was claimed off waivers by the Washington Redskins. In the 2019 season, he appeared in 15 games and recorded 22 carries for 81 rushing yards to go along with nine receptions for 64 receiving yards.

=== Pittsburgh Steelers ===
On July 28, 2020, Smallwood signed with the Pittsburgh Steelers. He was waived on September 5, 2020, and re-signed to the practice squad two days later. He was elevated to the active roster on December 2 for the team's week 12 game against the Baltimore Ravens, and reverted to the practice squad after the game. His practice squad contract with the team expired after the season on January 18, 2021.

=== Jacksonville Jaguars ===
On October 6, 2021, Smallwood was signed by the Jacksonville Jaguars to the practice squad. He was released on October 12.

=== Washington Football Team (second stint) ===
On November 2, 2021, Smallwood was signed to the Washington Football Team's practice squad.

== NFL career statistics ==
Year	Team	Games		Rushing					Receiving					Kick return			
Year	Team	GP	GS	Att	Yds	Avg	Lng	TD	Rec	Yds	Avg	Lng	TD	Att	Yds	Lng	TD
2016	PHI	13	1	77	312	4.1	19	1	6	55	9.2	18	0	9	261	86T	1
2017	PHI	8	3	47	174	3.7	26	1	13	103	7.9	24	0	4	93	28	0
2018	PHI	16	6	87	364	4.2	15	3	28	230	8.2	36	2	2	33	17	0
2019	WAS	15	0	22	81	3.7	17	0	9	64	7.1	18	0	1	14	14	0
2020	PIT	1	0	0	0	0.0	0	0	0	0	0.0	0	0	0	0	0	0
Career		53	12	233	931	4.0	26	5	56	452	8.1	36	2	16	401	86T	1

== Personal life ==
Smallwood is the son of Nichelle Barber and Wendell Smallwood. Growing up, he was a Philadelphia Eagles fan, his favorite player being Duce Staley, who became his position coach upon Smallwood being drafted by the Eagles. Smallwood and his wife, Autumn, have one daughter.

In July 2014, Smallwood was arrested in Delaware on charges of witness tampering. Smallwood was accused of trying to get a witness to recant statements they made implicating a friend of Smallwood's, Zakee Lloyd, charged with first-degree murder. The same day, the charges against Smallwood were dropped when prosecutors claimed Smallwood agreed to cooperate and testify at trial, Lloyd pleaded guilty to second-degree murder.

In November 2024, Smallwood was charged with wire fraud, conspiracy to commit wire fraud, and conspiracy to defraud the Internal Revenue Service. He pleaded guilty to defrauding the federal government's COVID relief programs of over $645,000 while taking full responsibility. On September 18, 2025 Smallwood was sentenced to serve 18 months in prison and repay the stolen funds. Smallwood, who is finishing a bachelors degree at West Virginia University, was ordered to report to federal prison in mid-December after his schooling. Smallwood also pleaded guilty to second-degree unlawful possession of an assault firearm for possessing an AR-15 rifle in the state of New Jersey and was sentenced to three years in state prison, concurrent to his federal sentence, with a requirement he remained incarcerated for at least one year. On August 7, 2026, Gloucester County Superior Court granted Smallwood's motion to withdraw a guilty plea he made previously to the unlawful possession of an assault firearm, which would allow for his early release that same month in order for Smallwood to be with his daughter during her last days due to her battle with cancer after an unsuccessful chemotherapy treatment.
