= Vinny Curry =

American football player (born 1988)

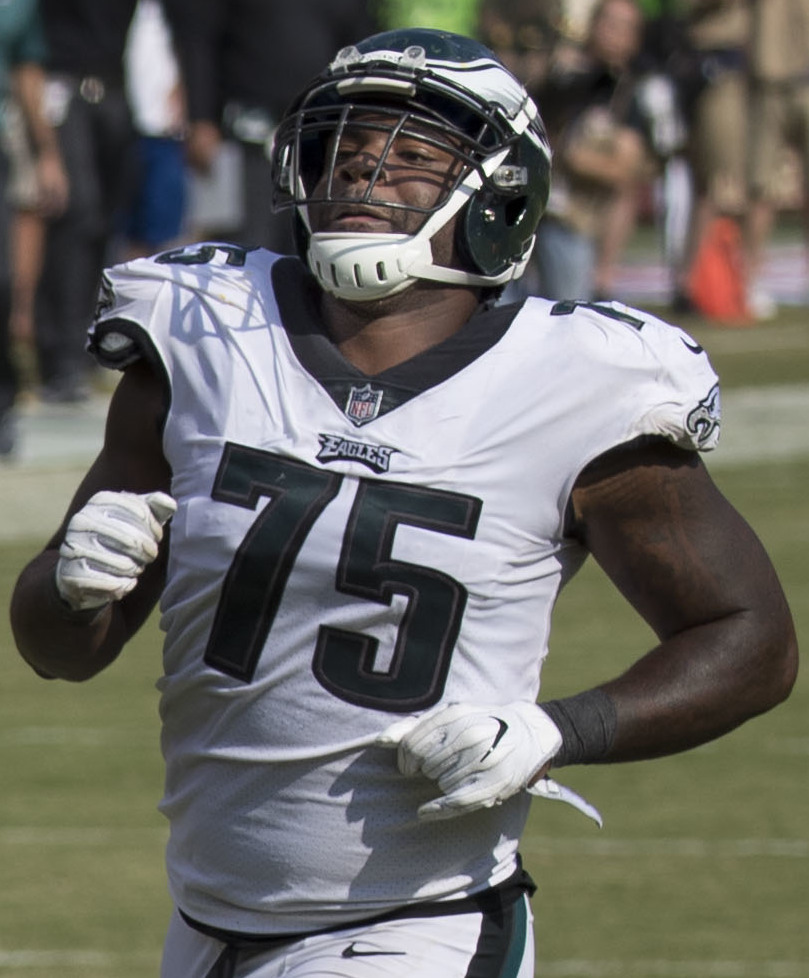
- Curry with the Philadelphia Eagles in 2017

No. 75, 97, 99
- Position: Defensive end

Personal information
- Born: June 30, 1988 (age 38); Neptune Township, New Jersey, U.S.
- Listed height: 6 ft 3 in (1.91 m)
- Listed weight: 279 lb (127 kg)

Career information
- High school: Neptune
- College: Marshall (2007–2011)
- NFL draft: 2012: 2nd round, 59th overall pick

Career history
- Philadelphia Eagles (2012–2017); Tampa Bay Buccaneers (2018); Philadelphia Eagles (2019–2020); New York Jets (2021–2022)

Awards and highlights
- Super Bowl champion (LII); First-team All-American (2011); C-USA Defensive Player of the Year (2011); 2× First-team All-C-USA (2010, 2011)

Career NFL statistics
- Total tackles: 209
- Sacks: 32.5
- Forced fumbles: 5
- Fumble recoveries: 2
- Stats at Pro Football Reference

Vincent Curry (born June 30, 1988) is an American former professional football player who was a defensive end for 11 seasons in the National Football League (NFL). After playing college football for the Marshall Thundering Herd, he was selected by the Philadelphia Eagles in the second round of the 2012 NFL draft, with whom he won Super Bowl LII.

== College career ==
Curry had his breakout season in 2010, as a junior where he had a career high 12 sacks. As a senior in 2011, Curry had 74 tackles, 11 sacks, and 6 forced fumbles. The 11 sacks were the sixth most in the nation and the 6 forced fumbles were second. Curry became the first Marshall player to win C-USA Defensive Player of the Year since Albert McClellan in 2006.

== Professional career ==
Pre-draft measurables
Height	Weight	Arm length	Hand span	Wingspan	40-yard dash	10-yard split	20-yard split	20-yard shuttle	Three-cone drill	Vertical jump	Broad jump	Bench press
6 ft 3 1/8 in (1.91 m)	266 lb (121 kg)	32 3/4 in (0.83 m)	9 1/4 in (0.23 m)	6 ft 5 5/8 in (1.97 m)	4.69 s	1.58 s	2.72 s	4.40 s	6.90 s	35.0 in (0.89 m)	9 ft 3 in (2.82 m)	28 reps
All values from NFL Combine/Pro Day

=== Philadelphia Eagles (first stint) ===
Curry was selected by the Philadelphia Eagles in the second round (59th overall) of the 2012 NFL draft. He was the highest selected player from Marshall since Darius Watts in 2004. He chose to wear number 75 with the Eagles out of respect for the 75 people lost in the crash of Southern Airways Flight 932, a Marshall charter flight in 1970. Curry signed a four-year contract with the team on May 9, 2012. His first year was uneventful: He played 6 games, started zero, and finished with 9 combined tackles. He was given an increased role in his second year, finishing with 17 tackles, 5 assists, 4 sacks, and 2 pass deflections. Curry had a breakout season in 2014, where he played all 16 games. Although he did not start a game and he only recorded 17 tackles and 2 assists, he recorded 9 sacks, second on the team only to Connor Barwin, and led the team in forced fumbles, with 4. In a disappointing 2015 season, Curry was moved to outside linebacker and struggled to find a groove, totaling 12 tackles and 3.5 sacks in 16 games and no starts.

Although there was speculation that Curry could leave the Eagles in free agency, the arrival of new defensive coordinator Jim Schwartz and the transition back into a 4-3 defense cemented his return to Philadelphia. On February 2, 2016, Curry signed a five-year, $47.5 million contract extension with the Eagles with $23 million guaranteed. The Eagles won Super Bowl LII against the New England Patriots 41–33. Curry recorded four tackles in the victory.

On March 16, 2018, two years into his five-year contract, Curry was released by the Eagles after declining to take a pay cut.

=== Tampa Bay Buccaneers ===
On March 19, 2018, Curry signed a three-year, $23 million contract with the Tampa Bay Buccaneers.

On February 12, 2019, after one season, Curry was released by the Buccaneers.

=== Philadelphia Eagles (second stint) ===
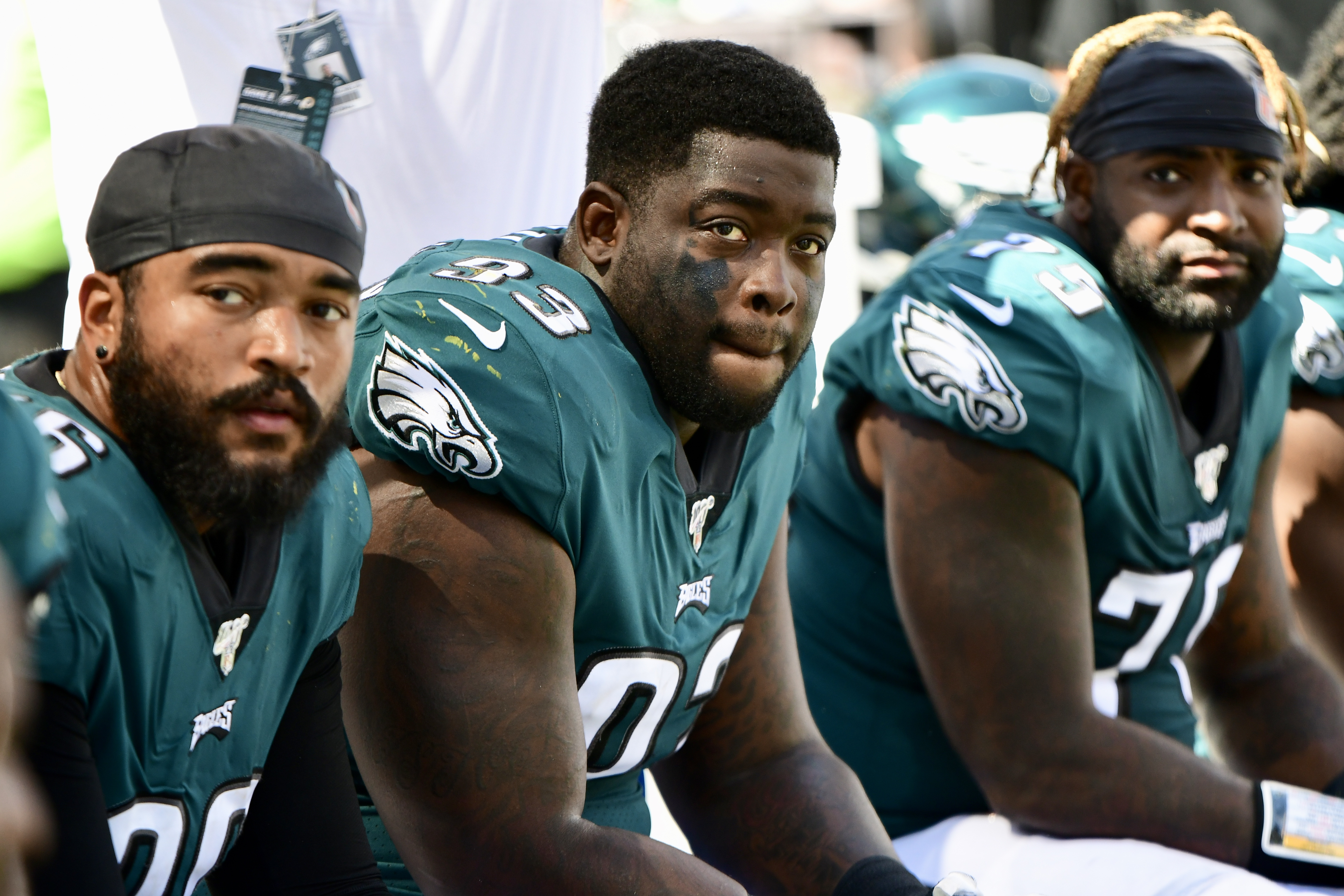
Curry (right) in a game against the Washington Redskins

On March 21, 2019, after one season away from the Eagles, Curry was re-signed on a one-year deal.

On August 10, 2020, Curry re-signed with the Eagles on a one-year deal. He was placed on injured reserve on September 15, 2020. He was designated to return from injured reserve on October 7, and began practicing with the team again. He was activated on October 17. He was placed on the reserve/COVID-19 list by the team on November 19, 2020, and activated on November 27.

=== New York Jets ===
Curry signed with the New York Jets on March 24, 2021.

On August 25, 2021, Curry announced that he was diagnosed with a rare blood disorder that required the removal of his spleen. He still hoped to return but was required to go on blood thinners after blood clots formed. This led to Curry being ruled out for the entire 2021 NFL season. He was released on January 7, 2022.

On April 20, 2022, Curry re-signed with the Jets. He was placed on injured reserve on September 1, 2022. He was activated on October 15.

On November 14, 2024, Curry officially retired as a member of the Philadelphia Eagles and served as the team's honorary captain for their game against the Washington Commanders that night.

== NFL career statistics ==
Legend
**Bold**	Career high

Year	Team	GP	Tackles				Fumbles			Interceptions					
Year	Team	GP	Cmb	Solo	Ast	Sck	FF	FR	Yds	Int	Yds	Avg	Lng	TD	PD
2012	PHI	6	9	8	1	0.0	0	0	0	0	0	0.0	0	0	0
2013	PHI	14	22	17	5	4.0	0	0	0	0	0	0.0	0	0	**2**
2014	PHI	16	19	17	2	**9.0**	**4**	**1**	0	0	0	0.0	0	0	0
2015	PHI	16	12	9	3	3.5	0	0	0	0	0	0.0	0	0	0
2016	PHI	16	26	18	8	2.5	0	0	0	0	0	0.0	0	0	0
2017	PHI	16	**42**	**25**	**17**	3.0	1	0	0	0	0	0.0	0	0	0
2018	TB	12	21	15	6	2.5	0	0	0	0	0	0.0	0	0	0
2019	PHI	16	27	20	7	5.0	0	0	0	0	0	0.0	0	0	0
2020	PHI	11	16	12	4	3.0	0	**1**	0	0	0	0.0	0	0	0
2021	NYJ	0	Did not play due to injury												
2022	NYJ	11	15	9	6	0.0	0	0	0	0	0	0.0	0	0	0
Career		134	209	150	59	32.5	5	2	0	0	0	0.0	0	0	2
