= David Sills (American football) =

American football player (born 1996)

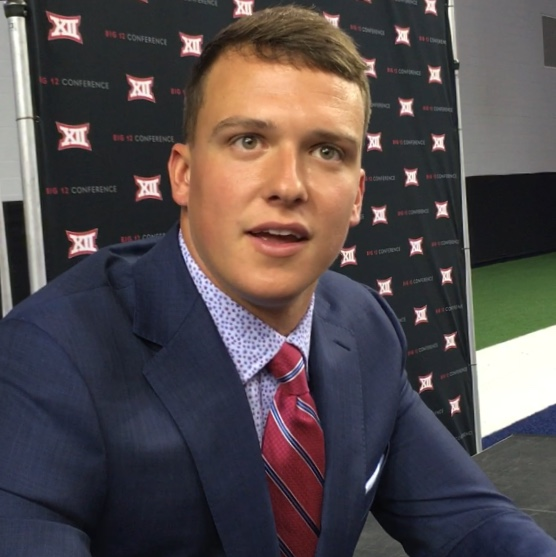
- Sills at 2018 Big 12 Media Days

No. 80 – Tampa Bay Buccaneers
- Position: Wide receiver
- Roster status: Practice squad

Personal information
- Born: May 29, 1996 (age 30); Wilmington, Delaware, U.S.
- Listed height: 6 ft 3 in (1.91 m)
- Listed weight: 211 lb (96 kg)

Career information
- High school: Eastern Christian Academy (Elkton, Maryland)
- College: West Virginia (2015, 2017–2018); El Camino (2016)
- NFL draft: 2019: undrafted

Career history
- Buffalo Bills (2019)*; New York Giants (2019–2022); Denver Broncos (2023–2024); Atlanta Falcons (2025); Tampa Bay Buccaneers (2026–present)
- * Offseason or practice squad member only

Awards and highlights
- First-team All-American (2017); Second-team All-American (2018); 2× First-team All-Big 12 (2017, 2018); FBS touchdown receptions leader (2017)

Career NFL statistics as of 2025
- Receptions: 31
- Receiving yards: 314
- Receiving touchdowns: 2
- Stats at Pro Football Reference

David Sills V (born May 29, 1996) is an American professional football wide receiver for the Tampa Bay Buccaneers of the National Football League (NFL).

As a seventh-grade quarterback in 2010, he garnered national attention when he verbally committed to play football at the University of Southern California. In 2014, Sills decommitted from USC and eventually signed a national letter of intent to play at West Virginia University. Sills began his college career as a quarterback, but moved to wide receiver as a freshman. After spending his freshman year playing for the West Virginia Mountaineers, Sills transferred to El Camino College, but transferred back to West Virginia in 2017. He led the nation that season in touchdown receptions and was a first-team 2017 College Football All-America Team selection by Sporting News, Sports Illustrated and CBS Sports for the 2017 West Virginia Mountaineers. He led the 2018 Big 12 Conference in touchdowns and was named 2018 All-Big 12 Conference football team first-team selection as well as a Second-team 2018 College Football All-American by the Walter Camp Football Foundation and American Football Coaches Association.

== Early life ==
Sills was born in 1996. His parents are Denise and David Sills IV. He has two older sisters, Emma and Abby. His father is a commercial developer and contractor, who played cornerback for the Virginia Military Institute. He began playing youth football at age six and began training at age nine with quarterback trainer Steve Clarkson.

Lane Kiffin offered Sills a scholarship to play college football at USC in 2010. Sills gave USC a non-binding verbal commitment in 2010. Sills was among the youngest football players to receive a scholarship offer from a major football program.

As a high school freshman, Sills was the starting quarterback for Red Lion Christian Academy, a private Delaware school for grades K-12. Sports Illustrated hailed him as one of the greatest prospects ever, and Bloomberg News described him as the "best arm money can buy". At Red Lion in 2010, he accumulated 1,355 passing yards and nine touchdowns against five interceptions in eight games. In 2011, he totalled 2,340 yards and 28 touchdowns in what was his second year as a varsity quarterback. He was named a MaxPreps.com U.S. Air Force second-team freshman All-American.

As a sophomore, Sills became the quarterback for Eastern Christian Academy (ECA) of Elkton, Maryland. The move was controversial because the school was a newly-formed online school. All enrolled boys were on the 46-man football team established by David Sills IV to showcase their talents to college scouts. Eastern Christian Academy was only able to play in three games in 2012 due to the school's failure to gain accreditation from the state. As a junior, Sills injured his knuckle and his delivery was impacted forever.

Lane Kiffin, who had originally offered Sills a scholarship back in 2010, was fired by USC in 2013. He was replaced by Ed Orgeron on an interim basis. Eventually, USC would hire Steve Sarkisian to become the new head coach. According to Sills' father, Sarkisian told his son that USC would honor their scholarship offer. While receiving reassurance from Sarkisian, the Sillses got the feeling that David wasn't USC's first option. USC had offered and eventually signed two highly ranked quarterbacks in the same class, Sam Darnold and Ricky Town. Sills decommitted from USC in June 2014.

College recruiting
Name	Hometown	School	Height	Weight	40^{‡}	Commit date
David Sills; QB	Elkton, Maryland	Red Lion (DE) (FR.); Eastern Christian Academy (MD)	6 ft 4 in (1.93 m)	210 lb (95 kg)	NA	
David Sills; QB	Recruit ratings: Scout: Rivals: (79)					
Overall recruit ranking: Scout: 29 (QB) Rivals: 14 (QB, prostyle), 8, (MD) ESPN: 17 (QB, pocket passer), 8, (MD)
‡ Refers to 40-yard dash; Note: In many cases, Scout, Rivals, 247Sports, On3, and ESPN may conflict in their listings of height, weight and 40 time.; In these cases, the average was taken. ESPN grades are on a 100-point scale.; Sources: "West Virginia Commit List for 2015". Rivals.; "Scout.com Football Recruiting: West Virginia". Scout.; "RecruitTracker 2015: West Virginia". ESPN.; "Scout.com Team Recruiting Rankings". Scout.; "2015 Team Ranking". Rivals.com.

== College career ==
=== West Virginia ===
On July 16, 2014, Sills announced his commitment to West Virginia University via Twitter. Sills was one of West Virginia's early enrollees from the 2015 recruiting class. As a result, he was able to participate in spring practice. He battled fellow quarterbacks Skyler Howard, William Crest Jr. and Chris Chugunov for the starting quarterback spot. Howard was eventually named the starting quarterback. Sills earned playing time as a wide receiver after impressing coaches with his performance on the scout team. On October 17, 2015, Sills made his collegiate debut against the Baylor Bears. He finished the game with two receptions for 64 yards. His second collegiate reception was a 35-yard touchdown. He made the game-winning touchdown reception in the 2016 Cactus Bowl against Arizona State and ended the season with seven receptions for 131 yards.

During spring drills in 2016, Sills split time between quarterback and wide receiver. After West Virginia's 2016 spring game, West Virginia head coach Dana Holgorsen stated that Howard solidified his position as the starting quarterback and that Crest and Chugunov would continue to battle for the backup quarterback spot. With several quarterbacks ahead of him on the depth chart and former Florida starting quarterback Will Grier scheduled to become eligible to play for the Mountaineers in 2017, it appeared unlikely Sills would ever get an opportunity to play quarterback at West Virginia.

=== El Camino College ===
On June 23, 2016, Sills announced he would transfer to El Camino College. He spent seven months on the couch of high school friend Khaliel Rodgers who was on the USC roster as an offensive lineman at the time. In his lone season playing for the Warriors, Sills played quarterback and threw for 1,636 yards and 15 touchdowns.

=== Return to West Virginia ===
On December 15, 2016, West Virginia football announced on Twitter that Sills would be returning to West Virginia. In West Virginia's 2017 spring game, Sills lined up at wide receiver and caught six passes for 98 yards from Will Grier. In the September 3 season opener for the 2017 West Virginia Mountaineers against the 21st-ranked Virginia Tech Hokies Sills posted nine receptions for 94 yards and two touchdowns in a losing effort against the Hokies. On September 9, Sills posted seven catches for a career-high 153 yards and a career-high three touchdowns against East Carolina. He then tallied 130 yards and two touchdowns against Kansas on September 23. Following the Kansas game and a bye week Sills was tied for the national lead in touchdown receptions with seven in his first four games and then he added two touchdown receptions on October 7 against TCU, bringing his total to nine. Sills added three more touchdown receptions on October 14 against Texas Tech extending his national lead. Sills' three receiving touchdowns on October 21 in a 38–36 victory over Baylor gave sills a total of 15 for the season, which continued to lead the nation. Sills made his 17th and 18th touchdown catches of the season on November 11 against Kansas State. However, in the following game, starting quarterback Grier was lost for the season, and Sills finished the season with 18 touchdowns.

As a junior, Sills received numerous honors. On November 13, he was one of three 2017 Big 12 Conference football wide receivers named as a semifinalist for the Biletnikoff Award (along with James Washington and Keke Coutee). A week later he was named as one of three finalists for the award (along with Washington and Michael Gallup). On November 30, Sills was the only member of the 2017 West Virginia Mountaineers football team named to the 2017 All-Big 12 Conference football first team. Sills finished the season as the NCAA Division I Football Bowl Subdivision touchdown receptions leader with 18 (tied with Anthony Miller). Sills earned 2017 College Football All-America Team first-team recognition from Sports Illustrated, Sporting News and CBS Sports. Sills also earned several second-team All-American honors, including Associated Press, Walter Camp Football Foundation, SB Nation, College Football News, and American Football Coaches Association. Sills decided to return to play his senior season with Grier.

Sills entered the season on watchlists for the Maxwell Award, Fred Biletnikoff Award, and Walter Camp Award. With Grier back for their senior seasons, Sills opened up the season with a seven-catch, 140-yard, two-touchdown effort in a victory over Tennessee. The Mountaineers schedule was cut short one game when Hurricane Florence caused a cancellation of the September 15 game at NC State. On September 22, Sills tallied three touchdowns against Kansas State. Sills also had 2-touchdown performances against Baylor (139 yards) on October 25, Texas on November 3, and Oklahoma (131 yards) on November 23. Sills' 15 touchdowns led the Big 12. Following the season, he was a 2018 All-Big 12 Conference football team first-team selection. Sills earned 2018 College Football All-America Team second-team recognition by the Walter Camp Football Foundation and, American Football Coaches Association. He earned third-team recognition from the Associated Press.

== Professional career ==
Pre-draft measurables
Height	Weight	Arm length	Hand span	Wingspan	40-yard dash	10-yard split	20-yard split	20-yard shuttle	Three-cone drill	Vertical jump	Broad jump	Bench press
6 ft 3 1/4 in (1.91 m)	211 lb (96 kg)	32 in (0.81 m)	9 in (0.23 m)	6 ft 3 5/8 in (1.92 m)	4.57 s	1.51 s	2.67 s	4.28 s	6.97 s	37.5 in (0.95 m)	10 ft 0 in (3.05 m)	14 reps
All values from NFL Combine/Pro Day

=== Buffalo Bills ===
Sills signed with the Buffalo Bills as an undrafted free agent on April 27, 2019. He was waived by the Bills on August 31.

=== New York Giants ===
On September 1, 2019, Sills was signed to the practice squad of the New York Giants. On December 17, Sills was promoted to the active roster.

Sills was placed on the reserve/COVID-19 list by the Giants on July 28, 2020, and activated from the list on August 4. On September 4, Sills was placed on the injured reserve list after fracturing his foot during training camp. He was placed on the reserve/COVID-19 list by the team on December 30, and moved back to injured reserve on January 7, 2021. Sills signed a contract extension with the team on January 7 through the 2021 season.

On August 31, 2021, Sills was waived by the Giants and re-signed to their practice squad the next day. On October 23, Sills was signed to the active roster. He was waived on October 26, and re-signed to the practice squad. On January 8, 2022, Sills was promoted to the active roster.

On March 11, 2022, Sills re-signed with the Giants. He surpassed 100 career receiving yards in Week 7 against the Jacksonville Jaguars, when he recorded a 19-yard reception that increased his career total from 99 to 118 receiving yards. Sills was released on December 31. He re-signed with the team's practice squad on January 3, 2023.

Sills signed a reserve/future contract on January 26, 2023. He was waived as part of final roster cuts on August 29.

=== Denver Broncos ===
On August 31, 2023, Sills was signed to the Denver Broncos' practice squad. He signed a reserve/future contract with Denver on January 8, 2024.

On August 27, 2024, Sills was released by the Broncos. The next day, he was re-signed to the practice squad.

=== Atlanta Falcons ===
On January 21, 2025, Sills signed a reserve/future contract with the Atlanta Falcons. He made the Falcons' initial 53-man roster before being released on September 5 and re-signed to the practice squad the following day. He was promoted to the active roster on September 13. In Week 12 against the New Orleans Saints, Sills caught the first touchdown of his NFL career on a nine-yard pass from Kirk Cousins in a 24–10 victory. He caught his second career touchdown the following week against the New York Jets. In Week 15 against the Tampa Bay Buccaneers, Sills recorded career highs with six receptions for 78 yards, including a diving 21-yard catch on fourth-and-14 in the final minute that set up Zane Gonzalez's game-winning 43-yard field goal in a 29–28 comeback victory. He appeared in all 17 games, making four starts, and finished the season with career highs of 18 receptions for 191 yards and two touchdowns.

=== Tampa Bay Buccaneers ===
On April 7, 2026, Sills signed with the Tampa Bay Buccaneers on a one-year contract. He was placed on injured reserve due to a hamstring injury on August 30. He was activated on October 22. On November 10, Sills was released. On November 16, he was re-signed to the practice squad.

== Career statistics ==
=== NFL ===
Year	Team	Games		Receiving				
Year	Team	GP	GS	Rec	Yds	Avg	Lng	TD
2019	NYG	0	0	DNP				
2020	NYG	0	0	DNP				
2021	NYG	4	1	2	17	8.5	12	0
2022	NYG	9	5	11	106	9.6	24	0
2023	DEN	3	1	0	0	0.0	0	0
2024	DEN	0	0	DNP				
2025	ATL	17	4	18	191	10.6	21	2
Career		33	11	31	314	10.6	24	2

=== College ===
Season	Team	Games			Passing								Rushing			
Season	Team	GP	GS	Record	Cmp	Att	Pct	Yds	Y/A	TD	Int	Rtg	Att	Yds	Avg	TD
2016	El Camino	10	10	4–6	127	238	53.4	1,636	6.9	15	7	126.0	96	258	2.7	5
Career		10	10	4−6	127	238	53.4	1,636	6.9	15	7	126.0	96	258	2.7	5

Year	Team	Games		Receiving			
Year	Team	GP	GS	Rec	Yds	Avg	TD
2015	West Virginia	8	1	7	131	18.7	2
2017	West Virginia	13	13	60	980	16.3	18
2018	West Virginia	12	12	65	986	15.2	15
Career		33	26	132	2,097	15.9	35

== See also ==
- 2017 College Football All-America Team
