= Alec Halaby =

American football executive

Personal information
- Born: 1986 or 1987 (age 39–40)

Career information
- High school: Madison Memorial (Madison, Wisconsin)
- College: Harvard

Career history
- Philadelphia Eagles (2007, 2009) Intern; Philadelphia Eagles (2010–2011) Player personnel analyst; Philadelphia Eagles (2012–2015) Special assistant to the general manager; Philadelphia Eagles (2016–2021) Vice president of football operations and strategy; Philadelphia Eagles (2022–2025) Assistant general manager

Awards and highlights
- Super Bowl champion (LII, LIX)

Alec Halaby (born 1986 or 1987) is an American professional football executive. He attended Harvard University and began his career with the Philadelphia Eagles in 2007, working with them until 2026.

== Early life ==
Halaby is from Madison, Wisconsin, and was born in 1987. He attended Madison Memorial High School where he played for the football team as a quarterback, being a starter as a senior. He later studied English at Harvard University, where he graduated in 2009.

== Executive career ==
Halaby became interested in analytics after a stint with the website Football Outsiders. While in college, he emailed all 32 National Football League (NFL) teams looking for a job, and he received a response from Howie Roseman of the Philadelphia Eagles. He joined the team as an intern in 2007. Working with the football operations department, he returned for a second year as an intern in 2009, then was hired full-time in 2010 to the position of player personnel analyst. He then was promoted to the title of special assistant to the general manager in 2012.

Halaby was described as an "instrumental figure in the front office at implementing data-driven principles." Roseman called Halaby a "safeguard" and said he often went to him for advice and research on players to potentially sign. His biography on the team website notes that he "has focused on player evaluation, roster management, and resource allocation, with a particular emphasis on integrating traditional and analytical methods in decision-making."

Halaby was given the position of vice president of football operations and strategy in 2016. He won a Super Bowl title in the 2017 season when the Eagles defeated the New England Patriots in Super Bowl LII. He received another promotion in 2022, to assistant general manager. Halaby stepped down following the 2026 NFL draft on April 29, 2026.

Halaby has been interviewed by several teams as a general manager candidate, including the Carolina Panthers and Washington Commanders in 2024, and the New York Jets in 2025.
