= Paul Turner (wide receiver) =

American football player (born 1993)

Charlotte 49ers
- Title: Wide receivers coach & pass game coordinator

Personal information
- Born: May 10, 1993 (age 33); West Monroe, Louisiana, U.S.
- Listed height: 5 ft 10 in (1.78 m)
- Listed weight: 193 lb (88 kg)

Career information
- High school: West Monroe
- College: Louisiana Tech
- NFL draft: 2016: undrafted

Career history

Playing
- Philadelphia Eagles (2016); Philadelphia Eagles (2017)*; New Orleans Saints (2018)*; New England Patriots (2018)*; New Orleans Saints (2018)*
- * Offseason or practice squad member only

Coaching
- Louisiana Tech (2020–2022); Graduate assistant (2020); Defensive analyst (2021); Safeties coach (2022); LSU (2023–2024) Lead offensive analyst; Charlotte (2025–present) Wide receivers coach & pass game coordinator

Career NFL statistics
- Receptions: 9
- Receiving yards: 126
- Stats at Pro Football Reference

Paul Turner (born May 10, 1993) is an American former professional football player who was a wide receiver in the National Football League (NFL). He played college football for the Louisiana Tech Bulldogs. He is currently in his 3rd year of coaching for his alma mater.

== Professional career ==
=== Philadelphia Eagles ===
Turner signed with the Philadelphia Eagles as an undrafted free agent in 2016. On September 4, 2016, Turner was waived by the Eagles and was signed to the Eagles practice squad the next day. He was promoted to the active roster on November 21, 2016.

On September 1, 2017, Turner was waived by the Eagles.

=== New Orleans Saints ===
On January 5, 2018, Turner signed a reserve/future contract with the New Orleans Saints. He was waived on June 21, 2018.

=== New England Patriots ===
On July 27, 2018, Turner signed with the New England Patriots. He was waived on August 31, 2018.

=== New Orleans Saints (second stint) ===
On January 16, 2019, Turner was signed to the New Orleans Saints practice squad, but was released three days later.

== Coaching ==
Turner returned to his alma mater Louisiana Tech as a graduate assistant coach in 2020, moving to defensive analyst in 2021. When Sonny Cumbie was hired as the new head coach, he made Turner into a full-time assistant coach, coaching the Bulldogs' safeties.

Turner joined Tim Albin's staff at Charlotte in January 2025 as wide receivers coach and pass game coordinator.
