= Darrell Greene =

American football player (born 1992)

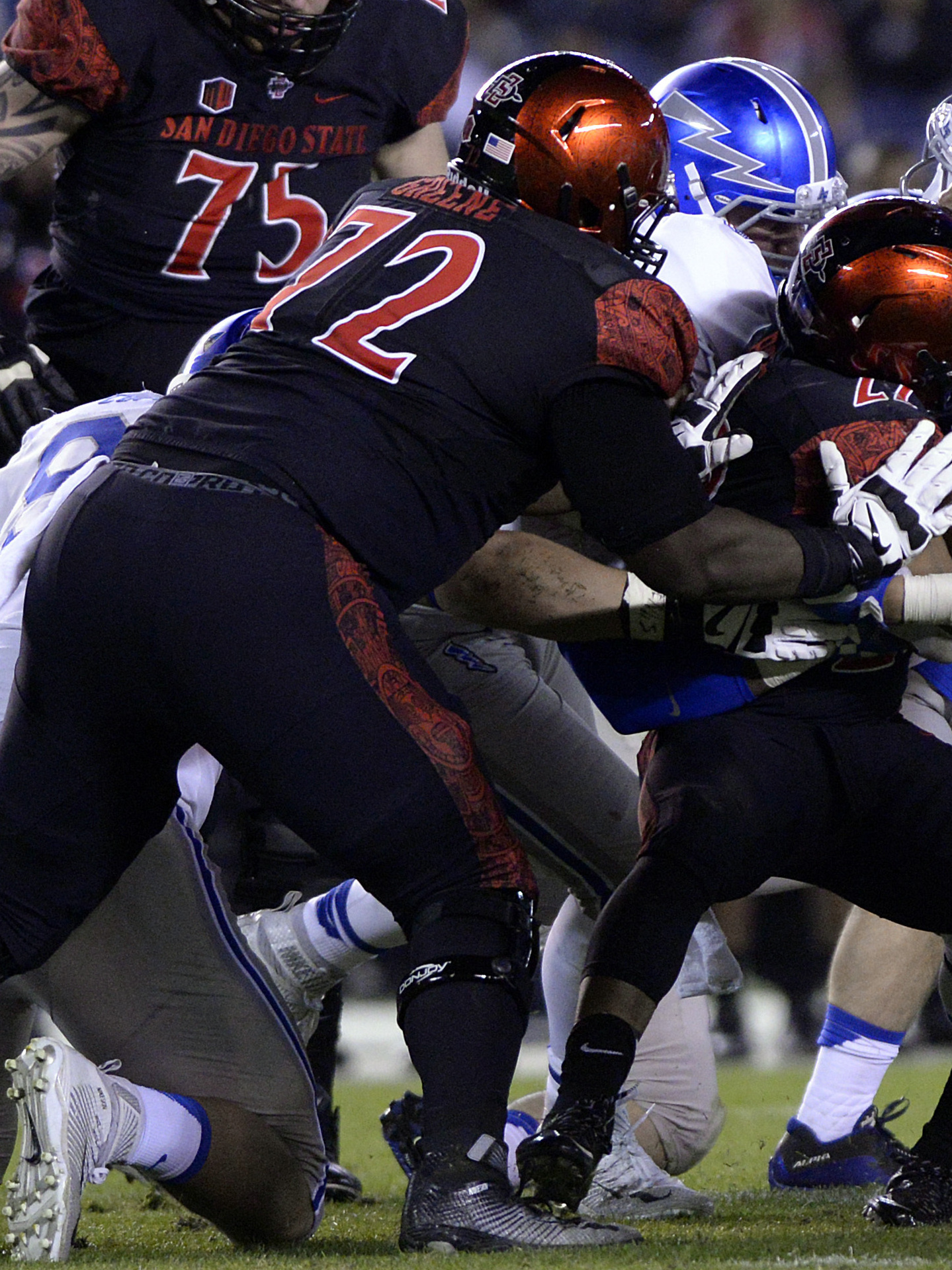
- Greene with San Diego State in the 2015 Mountain West Conference Football Championship Game

No. 78, 72, 69
- Position: Offensive guard

Personal information
- Born: October 29, 1992 (age 34); Decatur, Georgia, U.S.
- Listed height: 6 ft 4 in (1.93 m)
- Listed weight: 325 lb (147 kg)

Career information
- High school: Freedom (Oakley, California)
- College: San Diego State (2011–2015)
- NFL draft: 2016: undrafted

Career history
- Philadelphia Eagles (2016)*; Green Bay Packers (2017)*; Philadelphia Eagles (2017)*; San Diego Fleet (2019); Calgary Stampeders (2019)*
- * Offseason or practice squad member only

Awards and highlights
- Super Bowl champion (LII)
- Stats at Pro Football Reference
- Stats at CFL.ca

Darrell Greene (born October 29, 1992) is an American former football offensive guard. He played college football at San Diego State. He was on the practice squads of the Philadelphia Eagles and Green Bay Packers of the National Football League (NFL), winning Super Bowl LII with the Eagles. He also played for the San Diego Fleet of the Alliance of American Football (AAF).

== Early life ==
Darrell Greene was born on October 29, 1992, in Decatur, Georgia. He played high school football at Freedom High School in Oakley, California, earning first-team All-Bay Valley Athletic League (BVAL) and BVAL lineman of the year honors his senior year. He also played basketball in high school, leading the team in rebounds as a senior while garnering all-league recognition.

== College career ==
Greene played college football for the San Diego State Aztecs of San Diego State University from 2012 to 2015. He was redshirted in 2011, and played in two games in 2012. He appeared in all 13 games, starting 12, during the 2013 season. Greene started all 13 games at right guard in 2014 and was named honorable mention All-Mountain West. He missed the first six games of his senior year due to a marijuana suspension imposed by the NCAA. He then returned to start the final seven games of his senior year. He majored in social science at San Diego State. Greene was invited to the NFLPA Collegiate Bowl after his senior season.

== Professional career ==
Pre-draft measurables
Height	Weight	Arm length	Hand span	40-yard dash	10-yard split	20-yard split	20-yard shuttle	Three-cone drill	Vertical jump	Broad jump	Bench press
6 2 3/4	321 lb (146 kg)	31 5/8	9 5/8	5.20 s	1.83 s	3.02 s	4.98 s	8.07 s	21.5 in (0.55 m)	8 ft 2 in (2.49 m)	28 reps
All values from NFL Combine.

=== Philadelphia Eagles (first stint) ===
Greene had private workouts with the Cleveland Browns, Philadelphia Eagles, Indianapolis Colts, San Francisco 49ers, and Houston Texans prior to the 2016 NFL draft. After going undrafted, Greene signed with the Eagles. His deal with the Eagles was reported to be the biggest guarantee to any undrafted free agent in the NFL at $105,000. After failing to make the active roster, he was signed to the Eagles practice squad on September 27, 2016. He was signed and cut by the Eagles twice more before signing a reserves/futures contract with the organization on January 2, 2017. Greene was later released on September 2, 2017.

=== Green Bay Packers ===
Greene was signed to the Green Bay Packers practice squad on September 13, 2017. He was released by the Packers on October 30, 2017.

=== Philadelphia Eagles (second stint) ===
Greene was re-signed to the Eagles practice squad on December 8, 2017, and was on the practice squad when the Eagles defeated the New England Patriots in Super Bowl LII, giving Greene his first Super Bowl. He was released on September 1, 2018.

=== San Diego Fleet ===
Greene was signed to the San Diego Fleet of the Alliance of American Football (AAF) on October 26, 2018. He played in two games for the Fleet during the 2019 season. He was let go by the Fleet when the AAF folded operations in April 2019.

=== Calgary Stampeders ===
Greene signed with Calgary Stampeders of the Canadian Football League on May 10, 2019, but was released before the Stampeders finished the 2019 preseason.
