= C. J. Smith (American football) =

American football player (born 1993)

No. 35, 37
- Position: Cornerback

Personal information
- Born: May 10, 1993 (age 33); Savage, Minnesota, U.S.
- Listed height: 5 ft 11 in (1.80 m)
- Listed weight: 189 lb (86 kg)

Career information
- High school: Burnsville (Burnsville, Minnesota)
- College: North Dakota State
- NFL draft: 2016: undrafted

Career history
- Philadelphia Eagles (2016–2017); Cleveland Browns (2017); Denver Broncos (2018)*; Salt Lake Stallions (2019)
- * Offseason or practice squad member only

Awards and highlights
- 5× FCS national champion (2011–2015)

Career NFL statistics
- Total tackles: 2
- Stats at Pro Football Reference

C. J. Smith (born May 10, 1993) is an American former professional football player who was a cornerback in the National Football League (NFL). He was signed by the Philadelphia Eagles as an undrafted free agent following the 2016 NFL draft after playing college football for the North Dakota State Bison. He has also played for the Cleveland Browns and Denver Broncos.

== Professional career ==
=== Philadelphia Eagles ===
Smith signed with the Philadelphia Eagles after going undrafted in the 2016 NFL draft. On September 4, 2016, he was released by the Eagles. The next day, he was signed to the Eagles' practice squad. He was promoted to the active roster on October 13, 2016.

On September 2, 2017, Smith was waived by the Eagles and was signed to the practice squad the next day. He was released on September 12, 2017.

=== Cleveland Browns ===
On September 15, 2017, Smith was signed to the Cleveland Browns' practice squad. He was promoted to the active roster on December 16, 2017.

On March 19, 2018, the Browns traded Smith to the Seattle Seahawks in exchange for a conditional 2020 seventh-round pick. However three days later, the trade was nullified after Smith failed his physical with Seattle, sending him back to Cleveland. He was waived by the Browns on April 12, 2018.

=== Denver Broncos ===
On April 13, 2018, Smith was claimed off waivers by the Denver Broncos. He was waived on September 1, 2018.

=== Salt Lake Stallions ===
In 2019, Smith joined the Salt Lake Stallions of the Alliance of American Football. The league ceased operations in April 2019.

In October 2019, Smith was drafted by the XFL to play for the Dallas Renegades.
