= 2016 Seattle Seahawks season =

American football team season

- Owner: Paul Allen
- General manager: John Schneider
- Head coach: Pete Carroll
- Home stadium: CenturyLink Field

Results
- Record: 10–5–1
- Division place: 1st NFC West
- Playoffs: Won Wild Card Playoffs (vs. Lions) 26–6; Lost Divisional Playoffs (at Falcons) 20–36
- All-Pros: 2: LB Bobby Wagner (1st team); KR Tyler Lockett (2nd team)
- Pro Bowlers: 7: WR Doug Baldwin; TE Jimmy Graham; DE Cliff Avril; DE Michael Bennett; OLB K. J. Wright; MLB Bobby Wagner; CB Richard Sherman

Uniform
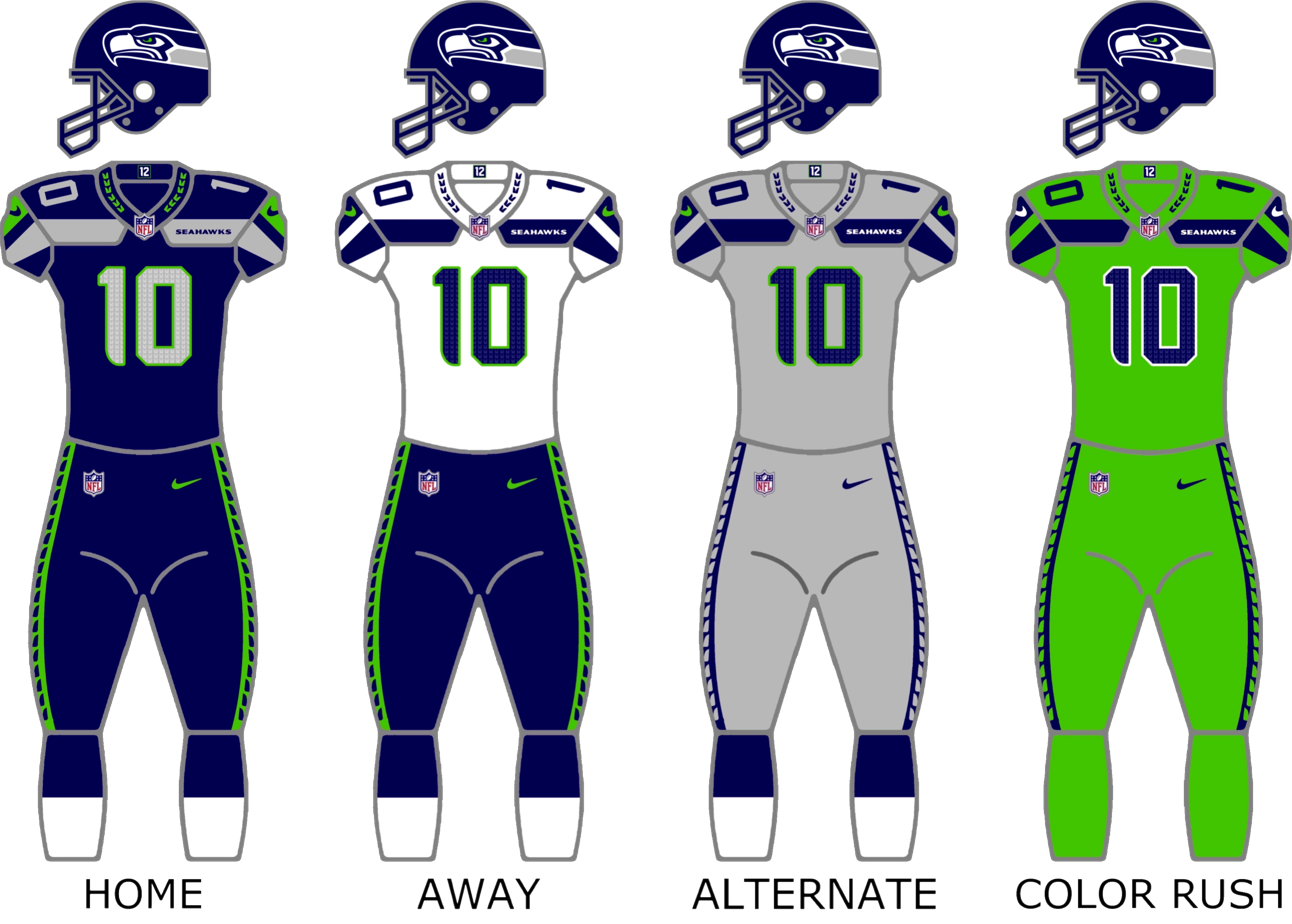

The 2016 season was the Seattle Seahawks' 41st in the National Football League (NFL) and their seventh under head coach Pete Carroll. On October 23, the team played the Arizona Cardinals in a game that ended in a 6–6 tie, the Seahawks' first tie in franchise history. With their win against the Los Angeles Rams in Week 15, the Seahawks claimed their third NFC West title in the last four years. The Seahawks defeated the Detroit Lions in the Wild Card Round but lost 36–20 to the eventual NFC champion Atlanta Falcons in the Divisional Round.

For the first time since trading for him in 2010, Marshawn Lynch did not play for the Seahawks as he retired in the offseason. Lynch would later come out of retirement to play for his hometown team Oakland Raiders before their relocation to Las Vegas. He ultimately rejoined the Seahawks in December 2019.

== Roster changes ==
=== Free agents ===
Position	Player	Tag	2016 team	Notes
G/T	Alvin Bailey	RFA	Cleveland Browns	Signed with the Browns on March 11
RB	Bryce Brown	UFA	TBD	
CB	Marcus Burley	ERFA	Seattle Seahawks	Signed tender on April 19
TE	Chase Coffman	UFA	Indianapolis Colts	Signed with the Colts on July 26
FB	Derrick Coleman	RFA	TBD	
DE	Demarcus Dobbs	UFA	TBD	
DT	A. J. Francis	ERFA	Seattle Seahawks	Signed tender on April 18
TE	Cooper Helfet	RFA	Seattle Seahawks	Signed tender on April 18
LB	Bruce Irvin	UFA	Oakland Raiders	Signed with the Raiders on March 9
RB	Fred Jackson	UFA	TBD	
QB	Tarvaris Jackson	UFA	TBD	
C	Lemuel Jeanpierre	UFA	Detroit Lions	Signed with the Lions on August 17
WR	Jermaine Kearse	UFA	Seattle Seahawks	Re-signed on March 10
CB	Jeremy Lane	UFA	Seattle Seahawks	Re-signed on March 9
C	Patrick Lewis	RFA	Seattle Seahawks	Signed tender on April 18
WR	Ricardo Lockette	UFA	Retired	Retired on May 12
TE	Anthony McCoy	UFA	TBD	
DT	Brandon Mebane	UFA	San Diego Chargers	Signed with the Chargers on March 9
RB	Christine Michael	RFA	Seattle Seahawks	Re-signed on March 17
LB	Nick Moody	RFA	TBD	
LB	Mike Morgan	UFA	Seattle Seahawks	Re-signed on March 19
T	Russell Okung	UFA	Denver Broncos	Signed with the Broncos on March 17
LB	Eric Pinkins	ERFA	Seattle Seahawks	Re-signed on March 16
DT	Ahtyba Rubin	UFA	Seattle Seahawks	Re-signed on March 7
P	Jon Ryan	UFA	Seattle Seahawks	Re-signed on March 11
CB	Mohammed Seisay	ERFA	Seattle Seahawks	Signed tender on April 18
CB	DeShawn Shead	ERFA	Seattle Seahawks	Signed tender on April 14
G	J. R. Sweezy	UFA	Tampa Bay Buccaneers	Signed with the Buccaneers on March 9
S	Steven Terrell	ERFA	Seattle Seahawks	Signed tender on April 18
FB	Will Tukuafu	UFA	Seattle Seahawks	Re-signed on August 20

=== Signings ===
Position	Player	2015 Team	Notes
WR	Jeff Fuller	Calgary Stampeders (CFL)	Signed February 11, waived June 28
RB	Cameron Marshall	Winnipeg Blue Bombers (CFL)	Signed February 11, waived May 4, signed August 4, waived August 15
DT	Sealver Siliga	New England Patriots	Signed March 14, placed on injured reserve August 29, released on September 3
OT	Bradley Sowell	Arizona Cardinals	Signed March 14
OT	J'Marcus Webb	Oakland Raiders	Signed March 15
LS	Drew Ferris	None	Signed March 23, waived August 4
DE	Chris Clemons	Jacksonville Jaguars	Signed April 1, retired July 28
CB	Brandon Browner	New Orleans Saints	Signed April 17, released August 29
DE	Tavaris Barnes	New Orleans Saints	Signed April 28
TE	Brandon Williams	Miami Dolphins	Signed April 28
QB	Jake Heaps	None	Signed May 2, waived on September 3
LB	Khairi Fortt	None	Signed May 16, released June 28
SS	Keenan Lambert	Oakland Raiders	Signed August 4, waived on September 3
RB	Jonathan Amosa	None	Signed August 6, waived August 20
WR	Uzoma Nwachukwu	BC Lions (CFL)	Signed August 6, waived on September 3
G	Jahri Evans	New Orleans Saints	Signed August 6, released on September 3
LB	Quayshawn Nealy	Tampa Bay Buccaneers	Signed August 15, waived August 30
DT	Tony McDaniel	Tampa Bay Buccaneers	Signed August 16
DT	Garrison Smith	San Francisco 49ers	Signed off waivers September 4

Indicates that the player was a free agent at the end of his respective team's 2015 season.

=== Departures ===
Position	Player	Notes
LS	Clint Gresham	Released March 16
DT	Jesse Williams	Waived March 8
LS	Andrew East	Waived March 24
QB	Phillip Sims	Waived April 28
C	Drew Nowak	Waived May 4
TE	Ronnie Shields	Waived May 4
DE	Josh Shirley	Waived May 4, signed August 9, placed on injured reserve August 30, waived on September 5
WR	Tyler Slavin	Waived May 4
OT	Kona Schwenke	Waived August 6
WR	Deshon Foxx	Placed on injured reserve August 30, waived on September 6
DE	DeAngelo Tyson	Waived August 29
RB	Zac Brooks	Waived August 30
RB	George Farmer	Placed on injured reserve August 30, waived on September 3
C	Patrick Lewis	Waived August 30
CB	Trovon Reed	Placed on injured reserve August 30, waived on September 3
G	Kristjan Sokoli	Waived August 30
WR	Kevin Smith	Placed on injured reserve August 30, waived on September 3
CB	Marcus Burley	Waived on September 3
WR	Antwan Goodley	Waived on September 3
WR	Kenny Lawler	Waived on September 3
WR	Douglas McNeil	Waived on September 3
C	Will Pericak	Waived on September 3
DE	Ryan Robinson	Waived on September 3
CB	Tye Smith	Waived on September 3
FB	Will Tukuafu	Released on September 3
WR	Kasen Williams	Waived on September 3
DT	Justin Hamilton	Waived on September 4

=== Trades ===
- September 3: The Seahawks acquired strong safety Dewey McDonald in a trade that sent a conditional 7th-round draft pick to the Oakland Raiders.

=== Draft ===
2016 Seattle Seahawks draft
Round	Selection	Player	Position	College	Trades
1	31	Germain Ifedi	G	Texas A&M	(Note: The Seahawks traded their first-round selection (No. 26 overall) to the Denver Broncos in exchange for the Broncos' first- and third-round selections (Nos. 31 and 94 overall, respectively).)
2	49	Jarran Reed	DT	Alabama	(Note: The Seahawks traded their second- and fourth-round selections (Nos. 56 and 124 overall, respectively) to the Chicago Bears in exchange for the Bears' second-round selection (No. 49 overall).)
3	90	C. J. Prosise	RB	Notre Dame	
3	94	Nick Vannett	TE	Ohio State	
3	97 *	Rees Odhiambo	G	Boise State	
4	None				
5	147	Quinton Jefferson	DT	Maryland	(Note: The Seahawks acquired the No. 147 and 243 overall selections (fifth- and seventh-rounds, respectively) in a trade that sent one of their seventh-round selections (No. 225 overall — previously acquired in a 2015 trade that sent running back Christine Michael to the Dallas Cowboys) and a 2017 fourth-round selection to the New England Patriots.) (Note: The Seahawks traded their original fifth-round selection (No. 162 overall) to the Kansas City Chiefs in exchange for safety Kelcie McCray.)
5	171 *	Alex Collins	RB	Arkansas	(Note: The Seahawks acquired the No. 147 and 243 overall selections (fifth- and seventh-rounds, respectively) in a trade that sent one of their seventh-round selections (No. 225 overall — previously acquired in a 2015 trade that sent running back Christine Michael to the Dallas Cowboys) and a 2017 fourth-round selection to the New England Patriots.) (Note: The Seahawks traded their original fifth-round selection (No. 162 overall) to the Kansas City Chiefs in exchange for safety Kelcie McCray.)
6	215 *	Joey Hunt	C	TCU	(Note: The Seahawks traded their original sixth-round selection (No. 202 overall) to the Detroit Lions in exchange for cornerback Mohammed Seisay.)
7	243	Kenny Lawler	WR	California	
7	247	Zac Brooks	RB	Clemson	

*	Compensatory selection

Draft trades

=== Undrafted free agents ===
All undrafted free agents were signed after the 2016 NFL draft concluded on April 30, unless noted otherwise.

Position	Player	College	Notes
QB	Trevone Boykin	TCU	
FB/DT	Brandin Bryant	Florida Atlantic	waived September 3
LB	Kyle Coleman	Arkansas–Pine Bluff	signed June 2, waived August 29
TE	Clayton Echard	Missouri	signed July 31, waived September 3
CB	DeAndre Elliott	Colorado State	
TE	George Fant	Western Kentucky	
LB	Christian French	Oregon	placed on injured reserve May 18, waived August 11
LS	Nolan Frese	Houston	signed June 28
DE	Tylor Harris	Wake Forest	signed August 11, waived September 3
WR	Montario Hunter	Elizabeth City State	signed July 29, waived August 29
DT	Lars Koht	Florida International	waived May 9
LB	Steve Longa	Rutgers	waived September 3
RB	Tre Madden	USC	placed on injured reserve August 7
OT	Lene Maiava	Arizona	waived July 29
CB	Jamal Marshall	North Texas	signed May 9, waived June 1
WR	Tanner McEvoy	Wisconsin	
DE	Montese Overton	East Carolina	waived August 11
LB	Kache Palacio	Washington State	signed August 6, waived September 3
DE	David Perkins	Illinois State	placed on injured reserve August 7, waived September 5
RB	Troymaine Pope	Jacksonville State	signed August 6, waived September 3
S	Tyvis Powell	Ohio State	
LB	Pete Robertson	Texas Tech	signed May 9, waived August 30
TE	Joe Sommers	Wisconsin–Oshkosh	signed August 6
FB	Taniela Tupou	Washington	signed May 9, waived September 3, signed September 5

== Personnel ==
=== Staff / Coaches ===
2016 Seattle Seahawks staff
**Front office**: Chairman – Paul Allen; President – Peter McLoughlin; Executive vice president/general manager – John Schneider; Vice president of football administration – Matt Thomas; Co-director of player personnel – Scott Fitterer; Co-director of player personnel – Trent Kirchner; Director of college scouting – Matt Berry; Director of pro personnel – Dan Morgan; Senior personnel executive – Ed Dodds; **Head coaches**: Head coach/executive vice president of football operations – Pete Carroll; Assistant head coach/offensive line – Tom Cable; Assistant head coach/defense – Rocky Seto; **Offensive coaches**: Offensive coordinator – Darrell Bevell; Quarterbacks – Carl Smith; Assistant quarterbacks – Will Harriger; Running backs – Sherman Smith; Wide receivers – Dave Canales; Assistant wide receivers – Nate Carroll; Tight ends – Pat McPherson; Assistant offensive line – Pat Ruel; Assistant offensive line – Brennan Carroll	**Defensive coaches**: Defensive coordinator – Kris Richard; Defensive line – Travis Jones; Assistant defensive line – Dwaine Board; Linebackers – Micheal Barrow; Assistant linebackers – Lofa Tatupu; Defensive backs – Andre Curtis; Assistant defensive backs – Ricky Manning Jr.; Defensive assistant – John Glenn; **Special teams coaches**: Special teams coordinator – Brian Schneider; Assistant special teams/assistant running backs – Chad Morton; Assistant special teams/assistant defensive backs – Nick Sorensen; **Strength and conditioning**: Head strength and conditioning – Chris Carlisle; Assistant strength and conditioning – Mondray Gee; Assistant strength and conditioning – Jamie Yancher

=== Final roster ===
2016 Seattle Seahawks roster
**Quarterbacks (QB)**: 2 Trevone Boykin; **3** Russell Wilson; **Running backs (RB)**: 36 Alex Collins; 26 Terrence Magee; 30 J. D. McKissic; 22 C. J. Prosise; **34** Thomas Rawls; 44 Marcel Reece FB; **Wide receivers (WR)**: **89** Doug Baldwin; **15** Jermaine Kearse; 19 Tanner McEvoy; 10 Paul Richardson; 18 Kasen Williams; **Tight ends (TE)**: **88** Jimmy Graham; 81 Nick Vannett; 86 Brandon Williams; 82 Luke Willson	**Offensive linemen (OL)**: **68** Justin Britt C; **74** George Fant T; **79** Garry Gilliam T; **63** Mark Glowinski G; 53 Joey Hunt C; **76** Germain Ifedi G; 70 Rees Odhiambo G; 78 Bradley Sowell T; **Defensive linemen (DL)**: **56** Cliff Avril DE; **72** Michael Bennett DE; 55 Frank Clark DE; **93** Tony McDaniel DT; 90 Jarran Reed DT; **77** Ahtyba Rubin DT; 92 John Jenkins DT	**Linebackers (LB)**: 52 Brock Coyle OLB; 91 Cassius Marsh OLB; 41 Dewey McDonald MLB; 57 Mike Morgan OLB; 58 Kevin Pierre-Louis OLB; 59 Ronald Powell OLB; **54** Bobby Wagner MLB; **50** K. J. Wright OLB; **Defensive backs (DB)**: **31** Kam Chancellor SS; 21 DeAndre Elliott CB; 32 Jeron Johnson FS; **20** Jeremy Lane CB; 33 Kelcie McCray SS; 40 Tyvis Powell SS; **35** DeShawn Shead CB; **25** Richard Sherman CB; 23 Steven Terrell FS; 27 Neiko Thorpe CB; **Special teams (ST)**: 48 Nolan Frese LS; 4 Stephen Hauschka K; 9 Jon Ryan P	**Practice squad**: 66 Ross Burbank C; 28 Pierre Desir CB; 39 George Farmer RB; 94 Justin Hamilton DT; 64 Tylor Harris DE (PS/I); 67 Shaneil Jenkins DE; 46 Malcolm Johnson FB; 11 Kenny Lawler WR; 85 Marcus Lucas TE; 62 Robert Myers G (PS/I); 49 Kache Palacio MLB (PS/I); 75 Will Pericak G; 37 Kelvin Taylor RB; **Reserve**: 95 Tavaris Barnes DE (IR); 42 Brandon Cottom FB (IR); 30 Stanley Jean-Baptiste CB (IR); 99 Quinton Jefferson DT (IR); **16** Tyler Lockett WR (IR); 38 Tre Madden RB (IR); 97 Damontre Moore DE (IR); 43 Troymaine Pope RB (IR); -- Mohammed Seisay CB (IR); 87 Ronnie Shields TE (IR); 13 Tyler Slavin WR (IR); 98 Garrison Smith DT (IR); 40 Joe Sommers TE (IR); **29** Earl Thomas FS (IR); 46 Will Tukuafu FB (IR); Rookies in italics 53 active, 18 reserve, 10 practice squad

- Starters in bold.
- (*) denotes players that were selected to the 2017 Pro Bowl.

== Preseason ==
The Seahawks' preliminary preseason schedule was announced on April 7. Exact dates and times were finalized on April 14, when the regular season schedule was announced.

Week	Date	Opponent	Result	Record	Venue	Recap
1	August 13	at Kansas City Chiefs	W 17–16	1–0	Arrowhead Stadium	Recap
2	August 18	Minnesota Vikings	L 11–18	1–1	CenturyLink Field	Recap
3	August 25	Dallas Cowboys	W 27–17	2–1	CenturyLink Field	Recap
4	September 1	at Oakland Raiders	W 23–21	3–1	Oakland Alameda Coliseum	Recap

== Regular season ==
=== Schedule ===
Divisional matchups: the NFC West played the NFC South and the AFC East.

Week	Date	Opponent	Result	Record	Venue	Recap
1	September 11	Miami Dolphins	**W** 12–10	1–0	CenturyLink Field	Recap
2	September 18	at **Los Angeles Rams**	**L** 3–9	1–1	Los Angeles Memorial Coliseum	Recap
3	September 25	**San Francisco 49ers**	**W** 37–18	2–1	CenturyLink Field	Recap
4	October 2	at New York Jets	**W** 27–17	3–1	MetLife Stadium	Recap
5	Bye					
6	October 16	Atlanta Falcons	**W** 26–24	4–1	CenturyLink Field	Recap
7	October 23	at **Arizona Cardinals**	**T** 6–6 (OT)	4–1–1	University of Phoenix Stadium	Recap
8	October 30	at New Orleans Saints	**L** 20–25	4–2–1	Mercedes-Benz Superdome	Recap
9	November 7	Buffalo Bills	**W** 31–25	5–2–1	CenturyLink Field	Recap
10	November 13	at New England Patriots	**W** 31–24	6–2–1	Gillette Stadium	Recap
11	November 20	Philadelphia Eagles	**W** 26–15	7–2–1	CenturyLink Field	Recap
12	November 27	at Tampa Bay Buccaneers	**L** 5–14	7–3–1	Raymond James Stadium	Recap
13	December 4	Carolina Panthers	**W** 40–7	8–3–1	CenturyLink Field	Recap
14	December 11	at Green Bay Packers	**L** 10–38	8–4–1	Lambeau Field	Recap
15	December 15	**Los Angeles Rams**	**W** 24–3	9–4–1	CenturyLink Field	Recap
16	December 24	**Arizona Cardinals**	**L** 31–34	9–5–1	CenturyLink Field	Recap
17	January 1, 2017	at **San Francisco 49ers**	**W** 25–23	10–5–1	Levi's Stadium	Recap

Note: Intra-division opponents are in bold text.

=== Game summaries ===
==== Week 1: vs. Miami Dolphins ====
Week One: Miami Dolphins at Seattle Seahawks – Game summary

Quarter	1	2	3	4	Total
Dolphins	0	3	0	7	**10**
**Seahawks**	3	3	0	6	**12**

at CenturyLink Field, Seattle, Washington

- Date: September 11
- Game time: 1:05 p.m. PDT
- Game weather: 61 °F (16 °C), sunny
- Game attendance: 69,012
- Referee: John Hussey
- TV announcers (CBS): Ian Eagle, Dan Fouts and Evan Washburn
- Recap, Gamebook

Game information

**First quarter**

- SEA – Steven Hauschka 39-yard field goal, 5:11. Seahawks 3–0. **Drive: 12 plays, 46 yards, 6:08.**

**Second quarter**

- MIA – Andrew Franks 41-yard field goal, 8:45. Tied 3–3. **Drive: 6 plays, 19 yards, 2:06.**
- SEA – Steven Hauschka 38-yard field goal, 0:00. Seahawks 6–3. **Drive: 10 plays, 72 yards, 1:52.**

**Third quarter**

- No scoring plays

**Fourth quarter**

- MIA – Ryan Tannehill 2-yard run (Andrew Franks kick), 4:08. Dolphins 10–6. **Drive: 7 plays, 86 yards, 3:01.**
- SEA – Doug Baldwin 2-yard pass from Russell Wilson (kick blocked), 0:31. Seahawks 12–10. **Drive: 14 plays, 75 yards, 3:37.**

**Top passers**

- MIA – Ryan Tannehill – 16/29, 186 yards
- SEA – Russell Wilson – 27/43, 258 yards, TD, INT

**Top rushers**

- MIA – Arian Foster – 13 rushes, 38 yards
- SEA – Christine Michael – 15 rushes, 66 yards

**Top receivers**

- MIA – Jarvis Landry – 7 receptions, 59 yards
- SEA – Doug Baldwin – 9 receptions, 92 yards, TD

==== Week 2: at Los Angeles Rams ====
Week Two: Seattle Seahawks at Los Angeles Rams – Game summary

Quarter	1	2	3	4	Total
Seahawks	0	3	0	0	**3**
**Rams**	3	3	0	3	**9**

at Los Angeles Memorial Coliseum, Los Angeles, California

- Date: September 18
- Game time: 1:05 p.m. PDT
- Game weather: 88 °F (31 °C), sunny
- Game attendance: 91,046
- Referee: Jerome Boger
- TV announcers (Fox): Joe Buck, Troy Aikman and Erin Andrews
- Recap, Gamebook

Game information

**First quarter**

- LA – Greg Zuerlein 39-yard field goal, 10:38. Rams 3–0. **Drive: 9 plays, 54 yards, 4:22.**

**Second quarter**

- SEA – Steven Hauschka 23-yard field goal, 14:45. Tied 3–3. **Drive: 14 plays, 76 yards, 7:08.**
- LA – Greg Zuerlein 28-yard field goal, 1:04. Rams 6–3. **Drive: 9 plays, 70 yards, 3:15.**

**Third quarter**

- No scoring plays

**Fourth quarter**

- LA – Greg Zuerlein 47-yard field goal, 14:10. Rams 9–3. **Drive: 9 plays, 58 yards, 4:28.**

**Top passers**

- SEA – Russell Wilson – 22/35, 254 yards
- LA – Case Keenum – 18/30, 239 yards

**Top rushers**

- SEA – Christine Michael – 10 rushes, 60 yards
- LA – Todd Gurley – 19 rushes, 51 yards

**Top receivers**

- SEA – Tyler Lockett – 4 receptions, 99 yards
- LA – Kenny Britt – 6 receptions, 94 yards

==== Week 3: vs. San Francisco 49ers ====
Week Three: San Francisco 49ers at Seattle Seahawks – Game summary

Quarter	1	2	3	4	Total
49ers	0	3	0	15	**18**
**Seahawks**	14	10	6	7	**37**

at CenturyLink Field, Seattle, Washington

- Date: September 25
- Game time: 1:05 p.m. PDT
- Game weather: 66 °F (19 °C), sunny
- Game attendance: 69,010
- Referee: Jeff Triplette
- TV announcers (Fox): Kevin Burkhardt, John Lynch and Pam Oliver
- Recap, Gamebook

Game information

**First quarter**

- SEA – Christine Michael 41-yard run (Steven Hauschka kick), 14:24. Seahawks 7–0. **Drive: 3 plays, 75 yards, 0:43.**
- SEA – Christine Michael 4–yard run (Steven Hauschka kick), 4:11. Seahawks 14–0. **Drive: 14 plays, 62 yards, 8:24.**

**Second quarter**

- SF – Phil Dawson 22-yard field goal, 9:44. Seahawks 14–3. **Drive: 5 plays, 26 yards, 1:58.**
- SEA – Jimmy Graham 18-yard pass from Russell Wilson (Steven Hauschka kick), 8:00. Seahawks 21–3. **Drive: 4 plays, 73 yards, 1:48.**
- SEA – Steven Hauschka 33-yard field goal, 1:16. Seahawks 24–3. **Drive: 7 plays, 42 yards, 2:39.**

**Third quarter**

- SEA – Steven Hauschka 33-yard field goal, 6:56. Seahawks 27–3. **Drive: 6 plays, 12 yards, 4:08.**
- SEA – Steven Hauschka 22-yard field goal, 2:32. Seahawks 30–3. **Drive: 7 plays, 16 yards, 3:34.**

**Fourth quarter**

- SEA – Doug Baldwin 16-yard pass from Trevone Boykin (Steven Hauschka kick), 12:59. Seahawks 37–3. **Drive: 7 plays, 58 yards, 3:37.**
- SF – Carlos Hyde 8-yard run (Phil Dawson kick), 7:53. Seahawks 37–10. **Drive: 11 plays, 75 yards, 5:03.**
- SF – Carlos Hyde 8-yard run (Carlos Hyde run), 1:01. Seahawks 37–18. **Drive: 8 plays, 47 yards, 2:44.**

**Top passers**

- SF – Blaine Gabbert – 14/25, 119 yards, INT
- SEA – Russell Wilson – 15/23, 243 yards, TD

**Top rushers**

- SF – Carlos Hyde – 21 rushes, 103 yards, 2 TD
- SEA – Christine Michael – 20 rushes, 106 yards, 2 TD

**Top receivers**

- SF – Torrey Smith – 3 receptions, 35 yards
- SEA – Doug Baldwin – 8 receptions, 164 yards, TD

==== Week 4: at New York Jets ====
Week Four: Seattle Seahawks at New York Jets – Game summary

Quarter	1	2	3	4	Total
**Seahawks**	0	14	3	10	**27**
Jets	3	7	0	7	**17**

at MetLife Stadium, East Rutherford, New Jersey

- Date: October 2
- Game time: 1:00 p.m. EDT/10:00 a.m. PDT
- Game weather: 61 °F (16 °C), cloudy
- Game attendance: 78,160
- Referee: Carl Cheffers
- TV announcers (Fox): Kevin Burkhardt, John Lynch and Pam Oliver
- Recap, Gamebook

Game information

**First quarter**

- NYJ – Nick Folk 34-yard field goal, 6:27. Jets 3–0. **Drive: 14 plays, 62 yards, 8:33.**

**Second quarter**

- SEA – C. J. Spiller 8-yard pass from Russell Wilson (Steven Hauschka kick), 11:34. Seahawks 7–3. **Drive: 7 plays, 92 yards, 3:32.**
- SEA – Tanner McEvoy 42-yard pass from Russell Wilson (Steven Hauschka kick), 3:44. Seahawks 14–3. **Drive: 7 plays, 85 yards, 3:58.**
- NYJ – Brandon Marshall 17-yard pass from Ryan Fitzpatrick (Nick Folk kick), 0:13. Seahawks 14–10. **Drive: 10 plays, 75 yards, 3:31.**

**Third quarter**

- SEA – Steven Hauschka 33-yard field goal, 4:13. Seahawks 17–10. **Drive: 9 plays, 41 yards, 3:30.**

**Fourth quarter**

- SEA – Christine Michael 6-yard pass from Russell Wilson (Steven Hauschka kick), 12:20. Seahawks 24–10. **Drive: 4 plays, 61 yards, 2:07.**
- SEA – Steven Hauschka 53-yard field goal, 4:04. Seahawks 27–10. **Drive: 4 plays, −15 yards, 1:38.**
- NYJ – Charone Peake 42-yard fumble recovery (Nick Folk kick), 2:15. Seahawks 27–17. **Drive: 7 plays, 75 yards, 1:49.**

**Top passers**

- SEA – Russell Wilson – 23/32, 309 yards, 3 TD
- NYJ – Ryan Fitzpatrick – 23/41, 261 yards, TD, 3 INT

**Top rushers**

- SEA – Christine Michael – 18 rushes, 58 yards
- NYJ – Matt Forte – 14 rushes, 27 yards

**Top receivers**

- SEA – Jimmy Graham – 6 receptions, 113 yards
- NYJ – Brandon Marshall – 4 receptions, 89 yards, TD

==== Week 6: vs. Atlanta Falcons ====
Week Six: Atlanta Falcons at Seattle Seahawks – Game summary

Quarter	1	2	3	4	Total
Falcons	0	3	21	0	**24**
**Seahawks**	7	10	0	9	**26**

at CenturyLink Field, Seattle, Washington

- Date: October 16
- Game time: 1:25 p.m. PDT
- Game weather: 54 °F (12 °C), rain
- Game attendance: 69,071
- Referee: Tony Corrente
- TV announcers (Fox): Chris Myers, Ronde Barber and Jennifer Hale
- Recap, Gamebook

Game information

**First quarter**

- SEA – Christine Michael 9-yard run (Steven Hauschka kick), 2:02. Seahawks 7–0. **Drive: 1 play, 9 yards, 0:05.**

**Second quarter**

- ATL – Matt Bryant 33-yard field goal, 8:38. Seahawks 7–3. **Drive: 12 plays, 52 yards, 4:37.**
- SEA – Alex Collins 2-yard run (Steven Hauschka kick), 4:32. Seahawks 14–3. **Drive: 8 plays, 75 yards, 4:06.**
- SEA – Steven Hauschka 42-yard field goal, 0:42. Seahawks 17–3. **Drive: 5 plays, 22 yards, 1:16.**

**Third quarter**

- ATL – Julio Jones 36-yard pass from Matt Ryan (Matt Bryant kick), 11:01. Seahawks 17–10. **Drive: 9 plays, 75 yards, 3:59.**
- ATL – Mohamed Sanu 10-yard pass from Matt Ryan (Matt Bryant kick), 6:11. Tied 17–17. **Drive: 8 plays, 79 yards, 3:23.**
- ATL – Levine Toilolo 46-yard pass from Matt Ryan (Matt Bryant kick), 0:17. Falcons 24–17. **Drive: 6 plays, 97 yards, 3:27.**

**Fourth quarter**

- SEA – Christine Michael 1-yard run (kick blocked), 4:43. Falcons 24–23. **Drive: 9 plays, 70 yards, 3:51.**
- SEA – Steven Hauschka 44-yard field goal, 1:57. Seahawks 26–24. **Drive: 7 plays, 24 yards, 1:51.**

**Top passers**

- ATL – Matt Ryan – 27/42, 335 yards, 3 TD, INT
- SEA – Russell Wilson – 25/37, 270 yards

**Top rushers**

- ATL – Devonta Freeman – 12 rushes, 40 yards
- SEA – Christine Michael – 18 rushes, 64 yards, 2 TD

**Top receivers**

- ATL – Julio Jones – 7 receptions, 139 yards, TD
- SEA – Jimmy Graham – 6 receptions, 89 yards

==== Week 7: at Arizona Cardinals ====
Week Seven: Seattle Seahawks at Arizona Cardinals – Game summary

Quarter	1	2	3	4	OT	Total
Seahawks	0	0	0	3	3	**6**
Cardinals	0	3	0	0	3	**6**

at University of Phoenix Stadium, Glendale, Arizona

- Date: October 23
- Game time: 5:30 p.m. PDT
- Game weather: Played indoors (retractable roof closed)
- Game attendance: 65,089
- Referee: Terry McAulay
- TV announcers (NBC): Al Michaels, Cris Collinsworth and Michele Tafoya
- Recap, Gamebook

Game information

**First quarter**

- No scoring plays

**Second quarter**

- ARI – Chandler Catanzaro 46-yard field goal, 3:11. Cardinals 3–0. **Drive: 15 plays, 53 yards, 8:24.**

**Third quarter**

- No scoring plays

**Fourth quarter**

- SEA – Steven Hauschka 40-yard field goal, 4:00. Tied 3–3. **Drive: 4 plays, 0 yards, 0:33.**

**Overtime**

- ARI – Chandler Catanzaro 45-yard field goal, 11:23. Cardinals 6–3. **Drive: 9 plays, 48 yards, 3:37.**
- SEA – Steven Hauschka 36-yard field goal, 6:42. Tied 6–6. **Drive: 9 plays, 57 yards, 4:41.**

**Top passers**

- SEA – Russell Wilson – 24/37, 225 yards
- ARI – Carson Palmer – 29/49, 342 yards

**Top rushers**

- SEA – Christine Michael – 16 rushes, 52 yards
- ARI – David Johnson – 33 rushes, 113 yards

**Top receivers**

- SEA – Doug Baldwin – 6 receptions, 69 yards
- ARI – J. J. Nelson – 3 receptions, 84 yards

Chandler Catanzaro and Steven Hauschka both missed chip-shot field goals in overtime as the Seahawks and Cardinals played to a 6–6 draw, the first tie in Seattle Seahawks history.

==== Week 8: at New Orleans Saints ====
Week Eight: Seattle Seahawks at New Orleans Saints – Game summary

Quarter	1	2	3	4	Total
Seahawks	7	7	3	3	**20**
**Saints**	0	13	3	9	**25**

at Mercedes-Benz Superdome, New Orleans, Louisiana

- Date: October 30
- Game time: 12:00 p.m. CDT/10:00 a.m. PDT
- Game weather: Played indoors (dome stadium)
- Game attendance: 73,188
- Referee: Ed Hochuli
- TV announcers (Fox): Justin Kutcher, Charles Davis, Chris Spielman and Peter Schrager
- Recap, Gamebook

Game information

**First quarter**

- SEA – Earl Thomas 34-yard fumble return (Steven Hauschka kick), 7:53. Seahawks 7–0.

**Second quarter**

- NO – Wil Lutz 22-yard field goal, 11:33. Seahawks 7–3. **Drive: 15 plays, 83 yards, 7:00.**
- SEA – Christine Michael 2-yard run (Steven Hauschka kick), 9:53. Seahawks 14–3. **Drive: 4 plays, 75 yards, 1:40.**
- NO – Wil Lutz 53-yard field goal, 5:15. Seahawks 14–6. **Drive: 10 plays, 40 yards, 4:38.**
- NO – Drew Brees 1-yard run (Wil Lutz kick), 0:49. Seahawks 14–13. **Drive: 9 plays, 37 yards, 4:13.**

**Third quarter**

- SEA – Steven Hauschka 44-yard field goal, 8:56. Seahawks 17–13. **Drive: 11 plays, 49 yards, 6:04.**
- NO – Wil Lutz 21-yard field goal, 3:14. Seahawks 17–16. **Drive: 11 plays, 74 yards, 5:42.**

**Fourth quarter**

- NO – Brandin Cooks 2-yard pass from Drew Brees (pass failed), 12:24. Saints 22–17. **Drive: 9 plays, 71 yards, 4:27.**
- SEA – Steven Hauschka 21-yard field goal, 6:38. Saints 22–20. **Drive: 13 plays, 72 yards, 5:46.**
- NO – Wil Lutz 41-yard field goal, 1:57. Saints 25–20. **Drive: 11 plays, 52 yards, 4:41.**

**Top passers**

- SEA – Russell Wilson – 22/34, 253 yards, INT
- NO – Drew Brees – 27/35, 265 yards, TD

**Top rushers**

- SEA – Christine Michael – 10 rushes, 40 yards, TD
- NO – Tim Hightower – 26 rushes, 102 yards

**Top receivers**

- SEA – C. J. Prosise – 4 receptions, 80 yards
- NO – Michael Thomas – 6 receptions, 63 yards

==== Week 9: vs. Buffalo Bills ====
Week Nine: Buffalo Bills at Seattle Seahawks – Game summary

Quarter	1	2	3	4	Total
Bills	14	3	0	8	**25**
**Seahawks**	7	21	0	3	**31**

at CenturyLink Field, Seattle, Washington

- Date: November 7
- Game time: 5:30 p.m. PST
- Game weather: 61 °F (16 °C), cloudy
- Game attendance: 69,084
- Referee: Walt Anderson
- TV announcers (ESPN): Sean McDonough, Jon Gruden and Lisa Salters
- Recap, Gamebook

Game information

**First quarter**

- BUF – Tyrod Taylor 3-yard run (Dan Carpenter kick), 13:32. Bills 7–0. **Drive: 1 play, 3 yards, 0:04.**
- SEA – Russell Wilson 3-yard run (Steven Hauschka kick), 12:21. Tied 7–7. **Drive: 3 plays, 58 yards, 1:11.**
- BUF – Justin Hunter 5-yard pass from Tyrod Taylor (Dan Carpenter kick), 2:21. Bills 14–7. **Drive: 17 plays, 75 yards, 10:00.**

**Second quarter**

- SEA – Jimmy Graham 17-yard pass from Russell Wilson (Steven Hauschka kick), 14:54. Tied 14–14. **Drive: 5 plays, 65 yards, 2:27.**
- BUF – Dan Carpenter 31-yard field goal, 9:32. Bills 17–14. **Drive: 12 plays, 62 yards, 5:22.**
- SEA – Christine Michael 3-yard run (Steven Hauschka kick), 4:29. Seahawks 21–17. **Drive: 3 plays, 40 yards, 1:42.**
- SEA – Jimmy Graham 18-yard pass from Russell Wilson (Steven Hauschka kick), 1:00. Seahawks 28–17. **Drive: 6 plays, 68 yards, 1:19.**

**Third quarter**

- No scoring plays

**Fourth quarter**

- BUF – Mike Gillislee 1-yard run (Tyrod Taylor run), 14:26. Seahawks 28–25. **Drive: 13 plays, 82 yards, 6:49.**
- SEA – Steven Hauschka 49-yard field goal, 9:49. Seahawks 31–25. **Drive: 8 plays, 44 yards, 4:37.**

**Top passers**

- BUF – Tyrod Taylor – 27/38, 289 yards, TD, INT
- SEA – Russell Wilson – 20/26, 282 yards, 2 TD

**Top rushers**

- BUF – LeSean McCoy – 21 rushes, 85 yards
- SEA – Tyler Lockett – 1 rush, 13 yards

**Top receivers**

- BUF – Robert Woods – 10 receptions, 162 yards
- SEA – Jimmy Graham – 8 receptions, 103 yards, 2 TD

With the win, the Seahawks have now recorded at least one victory at CenturyLink Field against each of the 31 other franchises.

==== Week 10: at New England Patriots ====
Week Ten: Seattle Seahawks at New England Patriots – Game summary

Quarter	1	2	3	4	Total
**Seahawks**	6	13	3	9	**31**
Patriots	7	7	7	3	**24**

at Gillette Stadium, Foxborough, Massachusetts

- Date: November 13
- Game time: 8:30 p.m. EST/5:30 p.m. PST
- Game weather: 43 °F (6 °C), clear and cool
- Game attendance: 66,829
- Referee: Gene Steratore
- TV announcers (NBC): Al Michaels, Cris Collinsworth and Michele Tafoya
- Recap, Gamebook

Game information

**First quarter**

- NE – LeGarrette Blount 1-yard run (Stephen Gostkowski kick), 10:19. Patriots 7–0. **Drive: 9 plays, 75 yards, 4:41.**
- SEA – Steven Hauschka 27-yard field goal, 7:10. Patriots 7–3. **Drive: 8 plays, 52 yards, 3:09.**
- SEA – Steven Hauschka 31-yard field goal, 1:33. Patriots 7–6. **Drive: 10 plays, 66 yards, 4:13.**

**Second quarter**

- SEA – Doug Baldwin 6-yard pass from Russell Wilson (kick blocked), 10:52. Seahawks 12–7. **Drive: 10 plays, 65 yards, 4:10.**
- NE – LeGarrette Blount 1-yard run (Stephen Gostkowski kick), 1:05. Patriots 14–12. **Drive: 11 plays, 81 yards, 4:59.**
- SEA – Doug Baldwin 18-yard pass from Russell Wilson (Steven Hauschka kick), 0:06. Seahawks 19–14. **Drive: 7 plays, 75, 0:50.**

**Third quarter**

- NE – LeGarrette Blount 13-yard run (Stephen Gostkowski kick), 7:52. Patriots 21–19. **Drive: 10 plays, 91 yards, 5:34.**
- SEA – Steven Hauschka 41-yard field goal, 2:52. Seahawks 22–21. **Drive: 9 plays, 52 yards, 5:00.**

**Fourth quarter**

- NE – Stephen Gostkowski 30-yard field goal, 13:00. Patriots 24–22. **Drive: 10 plays, 63 yards, 4:52.**
- SEA – Steven Hauschka 23-yard field goal, 8:56. Seahawks 25–24. **Drive: 8 plays, 58 yards, 4:04.**
- SEA – Doug Baldwin 15-yard pass from Russell Wilson (pass failed), 4:24. Seahawks 31–24. **Drive: 8 plays, 48 yards, 4:05.**

**Top passers**

- SEA – Russell Wilson – 25/37, 348 yards, 3 TD
- NE – Tom Brady – 23/32, 316 yards, INT

**Top rushers**

- SEA – C. J. Prosise – 17 rushes, 66 yards
- NE – LeGarrette Blount – 21 rushes, 69 yards, 3 TD

**Top receivers**

- SEA – C. J. Prosise – 7 receptions, 87 yards
- NE – Martellus Bennett – 7 receptions, 102 yards

Over one and half year after Super Bowl XLIX, the Seahawks were trying to get their revenge against the Patriots after the heartbreaking interception. They successfully got their revenge by stopping the Patriots from getting into the end zone, and won the game 31-24. The Seahawks were the only team to defeat the Patriots under Tom Brady during this season (their one other loss, against the Buffalo Bills in Week 4, happened during Brady's suspension for the Deflategate scandal). This also marked Pete Carroll's first game in New England in 17 years after he got fired from the Patriots organization. It was also Seattle's first game in New England since 2004.

==== Week 11: vs. Philadelphia Eagles ====
Week Eleven: Philadelphia Eagles at Seattle Seahawks – Game summary

Quarter	1	2	3	4	Total
Eagles	0	7	0	8	**15**
**Seahawks**	6	10	7	3	**26**

at CenturyLink Field, Seattle, Washington

- Date: November 20
- Game time: 1:25 p.m. PST
- Game weather: 54 °F (12 °C), rain
- Game attendance: 69,190
- Referee: Carl Cheffers
- TV announcers (CBS): Jim Nantz, Phil Simms and Tracy Wolfson
- Recap, Gamebook

Game information

**First quarter**

- SEA – C. J. Prosise 72-yard run (kick blocked), 11:02. Seahawks 6–0. **Drive: 2 plays, 80 yards, 0:48.**

**Second quarter**

- PHI – Zach Ertz 4-yard pass from Carson Wentz (Caleb Sturgis kick), 14:13. Eagles 7–6. **Drive: 13 plays, 68 yards, 7:35.**
- SEA – Jimmy Graham 35-yard pass from Russell Wilson (Steven Hauschka kick), 8:20. Seahawks 13–7. **Drive: 10 plays, 92 yards, 5:53.**
- SEA – Steven Hauschka 21-yard field goal, 3:47. Seahawks 16–7. **Drive: 6 plays, 74 yards, 1:45.**

**Third quarter**

- SEA – Russell Wilson 15-yard pass from Doug Baldwin (Steven Hauschka kick), 7:31. Seahawks 23–7. **Drive: 6 plays, 59 yards, 2:16.**

**Fourth quarter**

- SEA – Steven Hauschka 35-yard field goal, 13:34. Seahawks 26–7. **Drive: 8 plays, 24 yards, 2:42.**
- PHI – Dorial Green-Beckham 5-yard pass from Carson Wentz (Carson Wentz–Nelson Agholor pass), 3:42. Seahawks 26–15. **Drive: 10 plays, 66 yards, 3:33.**

**Top passers**

- PHI – Carson Wentz – 23/45, 218 yards, 2 TD, 2 INT
- SEA – Russell Wilson – 18/31, 272 yards, TD

**Top rushers**

- PHI – Wendell Smallwood – 13 rushes, 48 yards
- SEA – C. J. Prosise – 4 rushes, 76 yards, TD

**Top receivers**

- PHI – Jordan Matthews – 5 receptions, 59 yards
- SEA – Doug Baldwin – 4 receptions, 104 yards

==== Week 12: at Tampa Bay Buccaneers ====
Week Twelve: Seattle Seahawks at Tampa Bay Buccaneers – Game summary

Quarter	1	2	3	4	Total
Seahawks	0	5	0	0	**5**
**Buccaneers**	14	0	0	0	**14**

at Raymond James Stadium, Tampa, Florida

- Date: November 27
- Game time: 4:05 p.m. EST/1:05 p.m. PST
- Game weather: 81 °F (27 °C), cloudy
- Game attendance: 63,674
- Referee: Bill Vinovich
- TV announcers (Fox): Kenny Albert, Daryl Johnston and Laura Okmin
- Recap, Gamebook

Game information

**First quarter**

- TB – Mike Evans 3-yard pass from Jameis Winston (Roberto Aguayo kick), 7:41. Buccaneers 7–0. **Drive: 14 plays, 78 yards, 7:26.**
- TB – Mike Evans 23-yard pass from Jameis Winston (Roberto Aguayo kick), 3:00. Buccaneers 14–0. **Drive: 5 plays, 62 yards, 3:01.**

**Second quarter**

- SEA – Penalty on Luke Stocker enforced in the end zone for a safety, 13:29. Buccaneers 14–2.
- SEA – Steven Hauschka 43-yard field goal, 10:43. Buccaneers 14–5. **Drive: 8 plays, 47 yards, 2:44.**

**Third quarter**

- No scoring plays

**Fourth quarter**

- No scoring plays

**Top passers**

- SEA – Russell Wilson – 17/33, 151 yards, 2 INT
- TB – Jameis Winston – 21/28, 220 yards, 2 TD, INT

**Top rushers**

- SEA – Russell Wilson – 8 rushes, 80 yards
- TB – Doug Martin – 23 rushes, 87 yards

**Top receivers**

- SEA – Jimmy Graham – 6 receptions, 67 yards
- TB – Mike Evans – 8 receptions, 104 yards, 2 TD

==== Week 13: vs. Carolina Panthers ====
Week Thirteen: Carolina Panthers at Seattle Seahawks – Game summary

Quarter	1	2	3	4	Total
Panthers	0	7	0	0	**7**
**Seahawks**	10	13	7	10	**40**

at CenturyLink Field, Seattle, Washington

- Date: December 4
- Game time: 5:30 p.m. PST
- Game weather: 37 °F (3 °C), partly cloudy
- Game attendance: 69,104
- Referee: John Parry
- TV announcers (NBC): Al Michaels, Cris Collinsworth and Michele Tafoya
- Recap, Gamebook

Game information

**First quarter**

- SEA – Steven Hauschka 23-yard field goal, 13:23. Seahawks 3–0. **Drive: 4 plays, 3 yards, 1:23.**
- SEA – Thomas Rawls 8-yard run (Steven Hauschka kick), 6:42. Seahawks 10–0. **Drive: 9 plays, 92 yards, 3:55.**

**Second quarter**

- CAR – Ted Ginn Jr. 55-yard pass from Cam Newton (Graham Gano kick), 10:32. Seahawks 10–7. **Drive: 3 plays, 48 yards, 1:26.**
- SEA – Thomas Rawls 45-yard run (Steven Hauschka kick), 9:44. Seahawks 17–7. **Drive: 2 plays, 57 yards, 0:48.**
- SEA – Steven Hauschka 37-yard field goal, 1:45. Seahawks 20–7. **Drive: 11 plays, 56 yards, 5:43.**
- SEA – Steven Hauschka 31-yard field goal, 0:07. Seahawks 23–7. **Drive: 9 plays, 72 yards, 1:12.**

**Third quarter**

- SEA – Tyler Lockett 75-yard run (Steven Hauschka kick), 14:48. Seahawks 30–7. **Drive: 1 play, 75 yards, 0:12.**

**Fourth quarter**

- SEA – Jimmy Graham 1-yard pass from Russell Wilson (Steven Hauschka kick), 11:09. Seahawks 37–7. **Drive: 10 plays, 84 yards, 5:15.**
- SEA – Steven Hauschka 28-yard field goal, 3:28. Seahawks 40–7. **Drive: 11 plays, 70 yards, 6:00.**

**Top passers**

- CAR – Cam Newton – 14/32, 182 yards, TD
- SEA – Russell Wilson – 26/36, 277 yards, TD, INT

**Top rushers**

- CAR – Jonathan Stewart – 11 rushes, 50 yards
- SEA – Thomas Rawls – 15 rushes, 106 yards, 2 TD

**Top receivers**

- CAR – Ted Ginn Jr. – 5 receptions, 80 yards, TD
- SEA – Jermaine Kearse – 5 receptions, 68 yards

Sunday Night Football featured a Divisional Playoff rematch from 2015 as the Seattle Seahawks faced the Carolina Panthers in CenturyLink field. Russell Wilson threw for 277 yards with one touchdown and one interception while Cam Newton was held to 182 yards and one touchdown. This was the first time that Seattle had scored 40 points in a regular season game since the 2013 season. Seattle improved their record to 8-3-1 of season. The win was not without cost, however, as star safety Earl Thomas broke his leg early in the second quarter, knocking him out for the rest of the season.

==== Week 14: at Green Bay Packers ====
Week Fourteen: Seattle Seahawks at Green Bay Packers – Game summary

Quarter	1	2	3	4	Total
Seahawks	3	0	0	7	**10**
**Packers**	7	14	7	10	**38**

at Lambeau Field, Green Bay, Wisconsin

- Date: December 11
- Game time: 3:25 p.m. CST/1:25 p.m. PST
- Game weather: 26 °F (−3 °C), cloudy
- Game attendance: 78,057
- Referee: Walt Coleman
- TV announcers (Fox): Joe Buck, Troy Aikman and Erin Andrews
- Recap, Gamebook

Game information

**First quarter**

- GB – Davante Adams 66-yard pass from Aaron Rodgers (Mason Crosby kick), 13:41. Packers 7–0. **Drive: 3 plays, 75 yards, 1:30.**
- SEA – Steven Hauschka 28-yard field goal, 6:19. Packers 7–3. **Drive: 13 plays, 64 yards, 7:14.**

**Second quarter**

- GB – Ty Montgomery 1-yard run (Mason Crosby kick), 9:41. Packers 14–3. **Drive: 4 plays, 26 yards, 2:17.**
- GB – Jordy Nelson 9-yard pass from Aaron Rodgers (Mason Crosby kick), 5:21. Packers 21–3. **Drive: 5 plays, 48 yards, 2:44.**

**Third quarter**

- GB – Jordy Nelson 3-yard pass from Aaron Rodgers (Mason Crosby kick), 4:31. Packers 28–3. **Drive: 7 plays, 32 yards, 3:16.**

**Fourth quarter**

- GB – Mason Crosby 38-yard field goal, 10:12. Packers 31–3. **Drive: 5 plays, 19 yards, 1:15.**
- SEA – Tanner McEvoy 21-yard pass from Russell Wilson (Steven Hauschka kick), 8:26. Packers 31–10. **Drive: 7 plays, 75 yards, 2:10.**
- GB – Jeff Janis 19-yard run (Mason Crosby kick), 5:50. Packers 38–10. **Drive: 1 plays, 19 yards, 0:07.**

**Top passers**

- SEA – Russell Wilson – 22/39, 240 yards, TD, 5 INT
- GB – Aaron Rodgers – 18/23, 246 yards, 3 TD

**Top rushers**

- SEA – Thomas Rawls – 12 rushes, 67 yards
- GB – Ty Montgomery – 9 rushes, 41 yards, TD

**Top receivers**

- SEA – Doug Baldwin – 6 receptions, 46 yards
- GB – Davante Adams – 4 receptions, 104 yards, TD

Russell Wilson had his worst game of his career, throwing only one touchdown and a career-high five picks against a red-hot Packers team, causing the Seahawks to fall to their worst loss in the last six years. Seattle's defense was without safety Earl Thomas, who was out for the year with a broken leg. They only managed one sack on the final play in the third quarter, ending a streak of 10 consecutive quarters without a sack. Aaron Rodgers, with a 3:0 TD-INT ratio, posted a 150.8 passer rating in this game, the highest allowed by the Seattle defense since Pete Carroll became head coach in 2010.

==== Week 15: vs. Los Angeles Rams ====
Week Fifteen: Los Angeles Rams at Seattle Seahawks – Game summary

Quarter	1	2	3	4	Total
Rams	0	3	0	0	**3**
**Seahawks**	0	10	7	7	**24**

at CenturyLink Field, Seattle, Washington

- Date: December 15
- Game time: 5:25 p.m. PST
- Game weather: 36 °F (2 °C), partly cloudy
- Game attendance: 69,067
- Referee: Brad Allen
- TV announcers (NBC/NFLN/Twitter): Al Michaels, Cris Collinsworth and Heather Cox
- Recap, Gamebook

Game information

**First quarter**

- No scoring plays

**Second quarter**

- SEA – Luke Willson 8-yard pass from Russell Wilson (Steven Hauschka kick), 12:21. Seahawks 7–0. **Drive: 13 plays, 93 yards, 6:47.**
- SEA – Steven Hauschka 48-yard field goal, 8:45. Seahawks 10–0. **Drive: 4 plays, 0 yards, 2:03.**
- LA – Greg Zuerlein 36-yard field goal, 0:55. Seahawks 10–3. **Drive: 8 plays, 51 yards, 3:39.**

**Third quarter**

- SEA – Doug Baldwin 1-yard pass from Russell Wilson (Steven Hauschka kick), 3:12. Seahawks 17–3. **Drive: 8 plays, 62 yards, 4:37.**

**Fourth quarter**

- SEA – Tyler Lockett 57-yard pass from Russell Wilson (Steven Hauschka kick), 14:49. Seahawks 24–3. **Drive: 5 plays, 67 yards, 1:43.**

**Top passers**

- LA – Jared Goff – 13/25, 135 yards
- SEA – Russell Wilson – 19/26, 229 yards, 3 TD, INT

**Top rushers**

- LA – Todd Gurley – 14 rushes, 38 yards
- SEA – Thomas Rawls – 21 rushes, 34 yards

**Top receivers**

- LA – Kenny Britt – 4 receptions, 50 yards
- SEA – Tyler Lockett – 7 receptions, 130 yards, TD

With their 24–3 victory over the Rams, the Seahawks moved to 9–4–1 and clinched the NFC West title.

==== Week 16: vs. Arizona Cardinals ====
Week Sixteen: Arizona Cardinals at Seattle Seahawks – Game summary

Quarter	1	2	3	4	Total
**Cardinals**	7	7	0	20	**34**
Seahawks	0	3	7	21	**31**

at CenturyLink Field, Seattle, Washington

- Date: December 24
- Game time: 1:25 p.m. PST
- Game weather: 39 °F (4 °C), partly cloudy
- Game attendance: 69,050
- Referee: Ronald Torbert
- TV announcers (Fox): Kevin Burkhardt, John Lynch and Pam Oliver
- Recap, Gamebook

Game information

**First quarter**

- ARI – David Johnson 2-yard run (Chandler Catanzaro kick), 7:52. Cardinals 7–0. **Drive: 5 plays, 23 yards, 2:54.**

**Second quarter**

- ARI – J. J. Nelson 80-yard pass from Carson Palmer (Chandler Catanzaro kick), 3:53. Cardinals 14–0. **Drive: 3 plays, 91 yards, 1:30.**
- SEA – Steven Hauschka 27-yard field goal, 0:15. Cardinals 14–3. **Drive: 4 plays, 0 yards, 0:17.**

**Third quarter**

- SEA – Jermaine Kearse 2-yard pass from Russell Wilson (Steven Hauschka kick), 8:20. Cardinals 14–10. **Drive: 13 plays, 66 yards, 6:40.**

**Fourth quarter**

- ARI – David Johnson 1-yard run (Chandler Catanzaro kick), 13:32. Cardinals 21–10. **Drive: 9 plays, 61 yards, 4:59.**
- SEA – Doug Baldwin 42-yard pass from Russell Wilson (Russell Wilson–Marcel Reece pass), 8:49. Cardinals 21–18. **Drive: 9 plays, 75 yards, 4:43.**
- ARI – David Johnson 1-yard run (Chandler Catanzaro kick), 6:47. Cardinals 28–18. **Drive: 4 plays, 75 yards, 2:02.**
- ARI – Chandler Catanzaro 42-yard field goal, 4:10. Cardinals 31–18. **Drive: 4 plays, 6 yards, 0:59.**
- SEA – Jimmy Graham 37-yard pass from Russell Wilson (Steven Hauschka kick), 2:48. Cardinals 31–25. **Drive: 6 plays, 75 yards, 1:22.**
- SEA – Paul Richardson 5-yard pass from Russell Wilson (kick failed, wide left), 1:00. Tied 31–31. **Drive: 6 plays, 45 yards, 1:22.**
- ARI – Chandler Catanzaro 43-yard field goal, 0:00. Cardinals 34–31. **Drive: 8 plays, 50 yards, 1:00.**

**Top passers**

- ARI – Carson Palmer – 16/26, 284 yards, TD
- SEA – Russell Wilson – 29/45, 350 yards, 4 TD

**Top rushers**

- ARI – David Johnson – 28 rushes, 95 yards, 3 TD
- SEA – Russell Wilson – 10 rushes, 36 yards

**Top receivers**

- ARI – J. J. Nelson – 3 receptions, 132 yards, TD
- SEA – Doug Baldwin – 13 receptions, 171 yards, TD

==== Week 17: at San Francisco 49ers ====
Week Seventeen: Seattle Seahawks at San Francisco 49ers – Game summary

Quarter	1	2	3	4	Total
**Seahawks**	3	16	3	3	**25**
49ers	7	7	2	7	**23**

at Levi's Stadium, Santa Clara, California

- Date: January 1, 2017
- Game time: 1:25 p.m. PST
- Game weather: 54 °F (12 °C), clear
- Game attendance: 70,178
- Referee: Tony Corrente
- TV announcers (Fox): Joe Davis, Brady Quinn and Holly Sonders
- Recap, Gamebook

Game information

**First quarter**

- SEA – Steven Hauschka 31-yard field goal, 13:03. Seahawks 3–0. **Drive: 4 plays, 8 yards, 1:16.**
- SF – Shaun Draughn 1-yard run (Phil Dawson kick), 9:35. 49ers 7–3. **Drive: 7 plays, 75 yards, 3:28.**

**Second quarter**

- SF – Shaun Draughn 1-yard run (Phil Dawson kick), 14:56. 49ers 14–3. **Drive: 14 plays, 79 yards, 8:10.**
- SEA – Steven Hauschka 32-yard field goal, 10:32. 49ers 14–6. **Drive: 9 plays, 46 yards, 4:24.**
- SEA – Luke Willson 11-yard pass from Russell Wilson (Steven Hauschka kick), 6:55. 49ers 14–13. **Drive: 2 plays, 15 yards, 0:49.**
- SEA – Thomas Rawls 1-yard run (kick blocked), 3:00. Seahawks 19–14. **Drive: 5 plays, 91 yards, 1:50.**

**Third quarter**

- SEA – Steven Hauschka 33-yard field goal, 8:14. Seahawks 22–14. **Drive: 6 plays, 44 yards, 1:47.**
- SF – Nolan Frese fumble out of bounds in the end zone for a safety, 5:04. Seahawks 22–16.

**Fourth quarter**

- SEA – Steven Hauschka 28-yard field goal, 14:08. Seahawks 25–16. **Drive: 9 plays, 62 yards, 3:58.**
- SF – Garrett Celek 9-yard pass from Colin Kaepernick (Phil Dawson kick), 5:42. 49ers 25–23. **Drive: 4 plays, 35 yards, 2:22.**

**Top passers**

- SEA – Russell Wilson – 19/32, 258 yards, TD
- SF – Colin Kaepernick – 17/22, 215 yards, TD

**Top rushers**

- SEA – Alex Collins – 7 rushes, 55 yards
- SF – Shaun Draughn – 21 rushes, 41 yards, 2 TD

**Top receivers**

- SEA – Jimmy Graham – 4 receptions, 64 yards
- SF – Jeremy Kerley – 6 receptions, 61 yards

== Postseason ==
=== Schedule ===
Round	Date	Opponent (seed)	Result	Record	Venue	Recap
Wild Card	January 7, 2017	Detroit Lions (6)	W 26–6	1–0	CenturyLink Field	Recap
Divisional	January 14, 2017	at Atlanta Falcons (2)	L 20–36	1–1	Georgia Dome	Recap

=== Game summaries ===
==== NFC Wild Card Playoffs: vs. (6) Detroit Lions ====
NFC Wild Card Playoffs: (6) Detroit Lions at (3) Seattle Seahawks – Game summary

Quarter	1	2	3	4	Total
Lions	0	3	3	0	6
Seahawks	0	10	0	16	26

at CenturyLink Field, Seattle, Washington

- Date: January 7, 2017
- Game time: 5:15 p.m. PST
- Game weather: 38 °F (3 °C), cloudy
- Game attendance: 68,788
- Referee: Brad Allen
- TV announcers (NBC): Al Michaels, Cris Collinsworth, Michele Tafoya and Heather Cox
- Recap, Gamebook

Game information

First quarter

- No scoring plays

Second quarter

- SEA – Paul Richardson 2-yard pass from Russell Wilson (Steven Hauschka kick), 7:07. Seahawks 7–0. Drive: 14 plays, 60 yards, 7:45.
- SEA – Steven Hauschka 43-yard field goal, 1:55. Seahawks 10–0. Drive: 7 play, 51 yards, 2:53.
- DET – Matt Prater 51-yard field goal, 0:20. Seahawks 10–3. Drive: 7 play, 42 yards, 1:35.

Third quarter

- DET – Matt Prater 53-yard field goal, 4:03. Seahawks 10–6. Drive: 10 play, 61 yards, 5:33.

Fourth quarter

- SEA – Steven Hauschka 27-yard field goal, 14:12. Seahawks 13–6. Drive: 10 play, 66 yards, 4:51.
- SEA – Thomas Rawls 4-yard run (kick failed, hit right upright), 8:49. Seahawks 19–6. Drive: 8 plays, 82 yards, 4:08.
- SEA – Doug Baldwin 13-yard pass from Russell Wilson (Steven Hauschka kick), 3:36. Seahawks 26–6. Drive: 11 plays, 84 yards, 4:15.

Top passers

- DET – Matthew Stafford – 18/32, 205 yards
- SEA – Russell Wilson – 23/30, 224 yards, 2 TD

Top rushers

- DET – Zach Zenner – 11 rushes, 34 yards
- SEA – Thomas Rawls – 27 rushes, 161 yards, TD

Top receivers

- DET – Zach Zenner – 6 receptions, 54 yards
- SEA – Doug Baldwin – 11 receptions, 104 yards, TD

Seahawks go to the NFC Divisional Round to the Falcons and lost 36-20.

==== NFC Divisional Playoffs: at (2) Atlanta Falcons ====
NFC Divisional Playoffs: (3) Seattle Seahawks at (2) Atlanta Falcons – Game summary

Quarter	1	2	3	4	Total
Seahawks	7	3	3	7	20
Falcons	0	19	7	10	36

at Georgia Dome, Atlanta, Georgia

- Date: January 14, 2017
- Game time: 4:35 p.m. EST/1:35 p.m. PST
- Game weather: Played indoors (dome stadium)
- Game attendance: 71,155
- Referee: Gene Steratore
- TV announcers (Fox): Kevin Burkhardt, John Lynch, Pam Oliver and Peter Schrager
- Recap, Gamebook

Game information

First quarter

- SEA – Jimmy Graham 7-yard pass from Russell Wilson (Steven Hauschka kick), 6:26. Seahawks 7–0. Drive: 14 plays, 89 yards, 8:34.

Second quarter

- ATL – Julio Jones 7-yard pass from Matt Ryan (Matt Bryant kick), 14:14. Tied 7–7. Drive: 13 plays, 75 yards, 7:12.
- SEA – Steven Hauschka 33-yard field goal, 11:20. Seahawks 10–7. Drive: 6 plays, 40 yards, 2:54.
- ATL – Russell Wilson sacked in endzone by Ben Garland for a safety, 9:22. Seahawks 10–9.
- ATL – Matt Bryant 35-yard field goal, 6:06. Falcons 12–10. Drive: 5 plays, 40 yards, 3:16.
- ATL – Tevin Coleman 14-yard pass from Matt Ryan (Matt Bryant kick), 0:53. Falcons 19–10. Drive: 9 plays, 99 yards, 2:55.

Third quarter

- ATL – Devonta Freeman 1-yard run (Matt Bryant kick), 9:12. Falcons 26–10. Drive: 13 plays, 75 yards, 5:48.
- SEA – Steven Hauschka 26-yard field goal, 3:03. Falcons 26–13. Drive: 14 plays, 80 yards, 6:09.

Fourth quarter

- ATL – Matt Bryant 31-yard field goal, 14:57. Falcons 29–13. Drive: 7 plays, 62 yards, 3:06.
- ATL – Mohamed Sanu 3-yard pass from Matt Ryan (Matt Bryant kick), 3:40. Falcons 36–13. Drive: 8 plays, 46 yards, 4:36.
- SEA – Doug Baldwin 31-yard pass from Russell Wilson (Steven Hauschka kick), 3:21. Falcons 36–20. Drive: 1 plays, 31 yards, 0:19.

Top passers

- SEA – Russell Wilson – 17/30, 225 yards, 2 TD, 2 INT
- ATL – Matt Ryan – 26/37, 338 yards, 3 TD

Top rushers

- SEA – Russell Wilson – 6 rushes, 49 yards
- ATL – Tevin Coleman – 11 rushes, 57 yards

Top receivers

- SEA – Doug Baldwin – 5 receptions, 80 yards, TD
- ATL – Julio Jones – 6 receptions, 67 yards, TD

This was the final game in Seattle for longtime Seahawks Jermaine Kearse and Steven Hauschka. Seahawks revenge was in 2017 but missed the playoffs by the Rams 9-7.

== Standings ==
=== Division ===
NFC West
	W	L	T	PCT	DIV	CONF	PF	PA	STK
^{(3)} Seattle Seahawks	10	5	1	.656	3–2–1	6–5–1	354	292	W1
Arizona Cardinals	7	8	1	.469	4–1–1	6–5–1	418	362	W2
Los Angeles Rams	4	12	0	.250	2–4	3–9	224	394	L7
San Francisco 49ers	2	14	0	.125	2–4	2–10	309	480	L1

=== Conference ===
NFC
#	Team	Division	W	L	T	PCT	DIV	CONF	SOS	SOV	STK
Division leaders
1	Dallas Cowboys	East	13	3	0	.813	3–3	9–3	.471	.440	L1
2	Atlanta Falcons	South	11	5	0	.688	5–1	9–3	.480	.452	W4
3	Seattle Seahawks	West	10	5	1	.656	3–2–1	6–5–1	.441	.425	W1
4	Green Bay Packers	North	10	6	0	.625	5–1	8–4	.508	.453	W6
Wild Cards
5	New York Giants	East	11	5	0	.688	4–2	8–4	.486	.455	W1
6 (Note: Detroit finished ahead of Tampa Bay for the No. 6 seed and qualified for the last playoff spot based on record vs. common opponents—Detroit's cumulative record against Chicago, Dallas, Los Angeles and New Orleans was 3–2, while Tampa Bay's cumulative record against the same four teams was 2–3.)	Detroit Lions	North	9	7	0	.563	3–3	7–5	.475	.392	L3
Did not qualify for the postseason
7	Tampa Bay Buccaneers	South	9	7	0	.563	4–2	7–5	.492	.434	W1
8	Washington Redskins	East	8	7	1	.531	3–3	6–6	.516	.430	L1
9	Minnesota Vikings	North	8	8	0	.500	2–4	5–7	.492	.457	W1
10	Arizona Cardinals	West	7	8	1	.469	4–1–1	6–5–1	.463	.366	W2
11 (Note: New Orleans finished ahead of Philadelphia based on better record vs. conference opponents.)	New Orleans Saints	South	7	9	0	.438	2–4	6–6	.523	.393	L1
12	Philadelphia Eagles	East	7	9	0	.438	2–4	5–7	.559	.518	W2
13	Carolina Panthers	South	6	10	0	.375	1–5	5–7	.518	.354	L2
14	Los Angeles Rams	West	4	12	0	.250	2–4	3–9	.504	.500	L7
15	Chicago Bears	North	3	13	0	.188	2–4	3–9	.521	.396	L4
16	San Francisco 49ers	West	2	14	0	.125	2–4	2–10	.504	.250	L1
Tiebreakers (Note: When breaking ties for three or more teams under the NFL's rules, they are first broken within divisions, then comparing only the highest-ranked remaining team from each division.)
