= Nick Vannett =

American football player (born 1993)

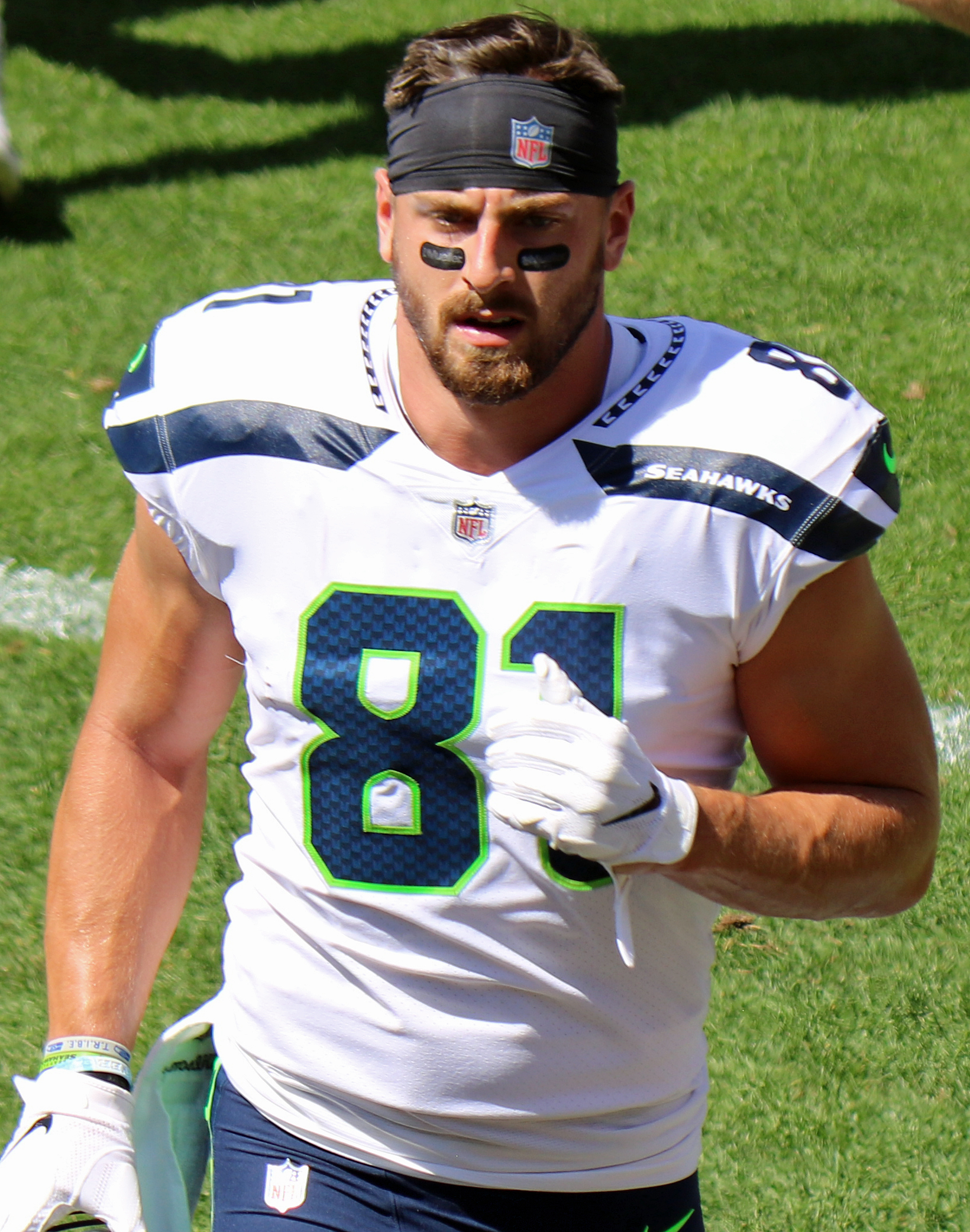
- Vannett with the Seattle Seahawks in 2018

No. 87 – Baltimore Ravens
- Position: Tight end
- Roster status: Practice squad

Personal information
- Born: March 6, 1993 (age 33); Westerville, Ohio, U.S.
- Listed height: 6 ft 6 in (1.98 m)
- Listed weight: 261 lb (118 kg)

Career information
- High school: Westerville Central
- College: Ohio State (2011–2015)
- NFL draft: 2016: 3rd round, 94th overall pick

Career history
- Seattle Seahawks (2016–2019); Pittsburgh Steelers (2019); Denver Broncos (2020); New Orleans Saints (2021–2022); New York Giants (2022); Houston Texans (2023)*; Los Angeles Chargers (2023); Tennessee Titans (2024); Minnesota Vikings (2025); Los Angeles Rams (2025); Seattle Seahawks (2026)*; Baltimore Ravens (2026–present)
- * Offseason or practice squad member only

Awards and highlights
- CFP national champion (2015)

Career NFL statistics as of Week 10, 2026
- Receptions: 108
- Receiving yards: 1,012
- Receiving touchdowns: 9
- Stats at Pro Football Reference

Nick Vannett (/ˈvænɛt/ VAN-eht; born March 6, 1993) is an American professional football tight end for the Baltimore Ravens of the National Football League (NFL). He played college football for the Ohio State Buckeyes and was a member of the Buckeyes team that won the 2015 College Football Playoff National Championship. Vannett was selected by the Seattle Seahawks in the third round of the 2016 NFL draft. He has played for an NFL-record ten teams (tied with Tillie Voss and Shayne Graham). In addition to the Seahawks, he has also played for the Pittsburgh Steelers, Denver Broncos, New Orleans Saints, New York Giants, Los Angeles Chargers, Tennessee Titans, Minnesota Vikings, and Los Angeles Rams.

== Early life ==
Vannett attended Westerville Central High School in Westerville, Ohio, where he graduated in 2011. Vannett played high school football for the Warhawks football team. He achieved all-metro, all-OCC, and all-district selections in recognition of his contributions on the field. Vannett had 47 receptions for 606 yards and eight touchdowns as a senior. He also played baseball in his youth but did not pursue the sport into college.

== College career ==
Vannett committed to Ohio State on June 30, 2010, and signed his letter of intent on February 2, 2011. He redshirted his first year at Ohio State but played in the next four seasons playing in 53 games totaling 55 receptions for 585 yards and six touchdowns. Vannett played a key role in Ohio State’s run to their first national championship win since 2002. In the first quarter, he caught a one-yard touchdown, giving the Buckeyes a 14–7 lead in the contest where they ultimately prevailed 42–20 against the Oregon Ducks. Prior to his senior season, Vannett was ranked as the best tight end prospect by ESPN NFL Draft analyst Todd McShay.

== Professional career ==
=== Pre-draft ===
On December 8, 2015, it was reported that Vannett had accepted his invitation to play in the 2016 Senior Bowl. The week leading up to the Senior Bowl, he impressed many scouts and analysts during practice with many surprised by his blocking skills and receiving ability. Vannett was described as a physically imposing receiver with strong hands and ability to concentrate on contested catches. On January 30, 2016, he caught three passes for 58-yards as a part of Dallas Cowboys head coach Jason Garrett's North team who lost 16–27 to the South. Vannett was one of 15 tight ends who received an invitation to the NFL Combine and one of 14 players from Ohio state. A back injury prevented him from completing all of the combine drills, including the 40-yard dash, 20-yard dash, and 10-yard dash. Vannett's performance was described by scouts as mediocre as he finished eighth in the bench press and seventh in the vertical jump. His best performances were in the short shuttle, where he tied for second, and tied South Carolina State's Temarrick Hemingway for first in the 60-yard shuttle. On March 11, 2016, Vannett attended Ohio State's Pro Day, along with Cardale Jones, Pat Elflein, Eli Apple, Marshon Lattimore, Braxton Miller, Michael Thomas, Joey Bosa, Vonn Bell, Darron Lee, Taylor Decker, Ezekiel Elliott, Joshua Perry, Jalin Marshall, Adolphus Washington, and Tyvis Powell. Along with positional drills, Vannett performed the 40-yard dash, 20-yard dash, 20-yard dash, vertical jump (29½"), and broad jump (9'5"). He performed well for the collection of over 122 team representatives and scouts, that included head coaches Mike Mularkey (Tennessee Titans), Mike Zimmer (Minnesota Vikings, Mike Tomlin (Pittsburgh Steelers), Sean Payton (New Orleans Saints), and Marvin Lewis (Cincinnati Bengals). At the end of the pre-draft process, Vannett was projected to be a third or fourth round pick by the majority of NFL draft experts and analysts. He was ranked the second-best tight end prospect in the draft by Sports Illustrated, the third best tight end prospect by NFLDraftScout.com, and was ranked the fourth best tight end by NFL analyst Mike Mayock.

Pre-draft measurables
Height	Weight	Arm length	Hand span	Wingspan	40-yard dash	10-yard split	20-yard split	20-yard shuttle	Three-cone drill	Vertical jump	Broad jump	Bench press	Wonderlic
6 ft 6 in (1.98 m)	257 lb (117 kg)	34 1/4 in (0.87 m)	10 in (0.25 m)	6 ft 9 1/8 in (2.06 m)	4.89 s	1.72 s	2.81 s	4.20 s	7.05 s	30.5 in (0.77 m)	9 ft 5 in (2.87 m)	17 reps	34
All values from NFL Combine/Ohio State's Pro Day

=== Seattle Seahawks (first stint) ===
==== 2016 ====
On April 29, 2016, Vannett was selected by the Seattle Seahawks in the third round with the 94th overall pick in the 2016 NFL draft. He was the third tight end selected, behind Hunter Henry (second round, 35th overall) and Austin Hooper (third round, 81st overall). Head coach Pete Carroll and general manager John Schneider stated that they originally drafted Vannett to be a traditional Y tight end that is more focused on blocking. He became more of a complete tight end after surprising Carroll and Schneider with his receiving skills in off season workouts. On May 6, the Seahawks signed Vannett to a four-year, $3.05 million contract that included a signing bonus of $656,880.

Vannett entered his first training camp for the Seattle Seahawks competing against Luke Willson, Cooper Helfet, Ronnie Shields, and Brandon Williams for the job as the second tight end. Head coach Pete Carroll named Vannett the third tight end to begin the regular season, behind veterans Jimmy Graham and Luke Willson.

During the Seahawks' second preseason game against the Vikings, Vannett caught one pass for a 15-yard gain, but suffered an ankle injury and was unable to finish the 18–11 loss. He missed the last two preseason games and the first four regular season games due to the high ankle sprain. On October 16, 2016, Vannett made his professional regular season debut during a narrow 26–24 victory over the Atlanta Falcons. He played three offensive snaps and two on special teams in his debut. During the game, Seahawks' tight end Luke Willson left after sustaining a knee injury that would require surgery to repair damaged cartilage and stretched ligaments. Vannett moved up on the depth chart to take his place during Willson's absence. Two weeks later, Vannett made his first career reception during a 25–20 loss to the Saints. He caught his first career reception from a pass from Russell Wilson and gained seven yards before being tackled by Saints cornerback De'Vante Harris. During a Week 10 matchup at the New England Patriots, Vannett made his first career start as the Seahawks defeated the Patriots 31–24. Three weeks later, he earned his second career start and caught a season-high two passes for 25 yards as the Seahawks routed the Carolina Panthers 40–7. Vannett was a healthy scratch through Weeks 16–17 and throughout the postseason as head coach Pete Carroll decided to instead play Jimmy Graham, Luke Willson and Brandon Williams. He completed the 2016 season with a total of three receptions for 32 yards and played in nine games with two starts.

==== 2017 ====
Vannett was slated to be the third tight end on the Seahawks' depth chart to begin the 2017 season after Brandon Williams departed for the Indianapolis Colts in free agency.

Vannett played in the season-opener at the Green Bay Packers and had one reception for a 10-yard gain during the 17–9 loss. On November 26, 2017, Vannett caught two passes for 29 yards and scored his first career touchdown in a 24–13 road victory over the San Francisco 49ers. His first career touchdown came in the third quarter as he beat 49ers' linebacker Eli Harold and caught a pass from Russell Wilson to score a 27-yard touchdown to help the Seahawks gain a 13–6 lead. The following week, Vannett started his second game of the season and made a season-high three receptions for 40 yards in a 24–10 victory over the Philadelphia Eagles. He finished the 2017 season with 12 receptions for 124 yards and a touchdown.

==== 2018 ====
In the 2018 season, Vannett recorded 29 receptions for 269 yards and three touchdowns in 15 games and nine starts.

=== Pittsburgh Steelers ===
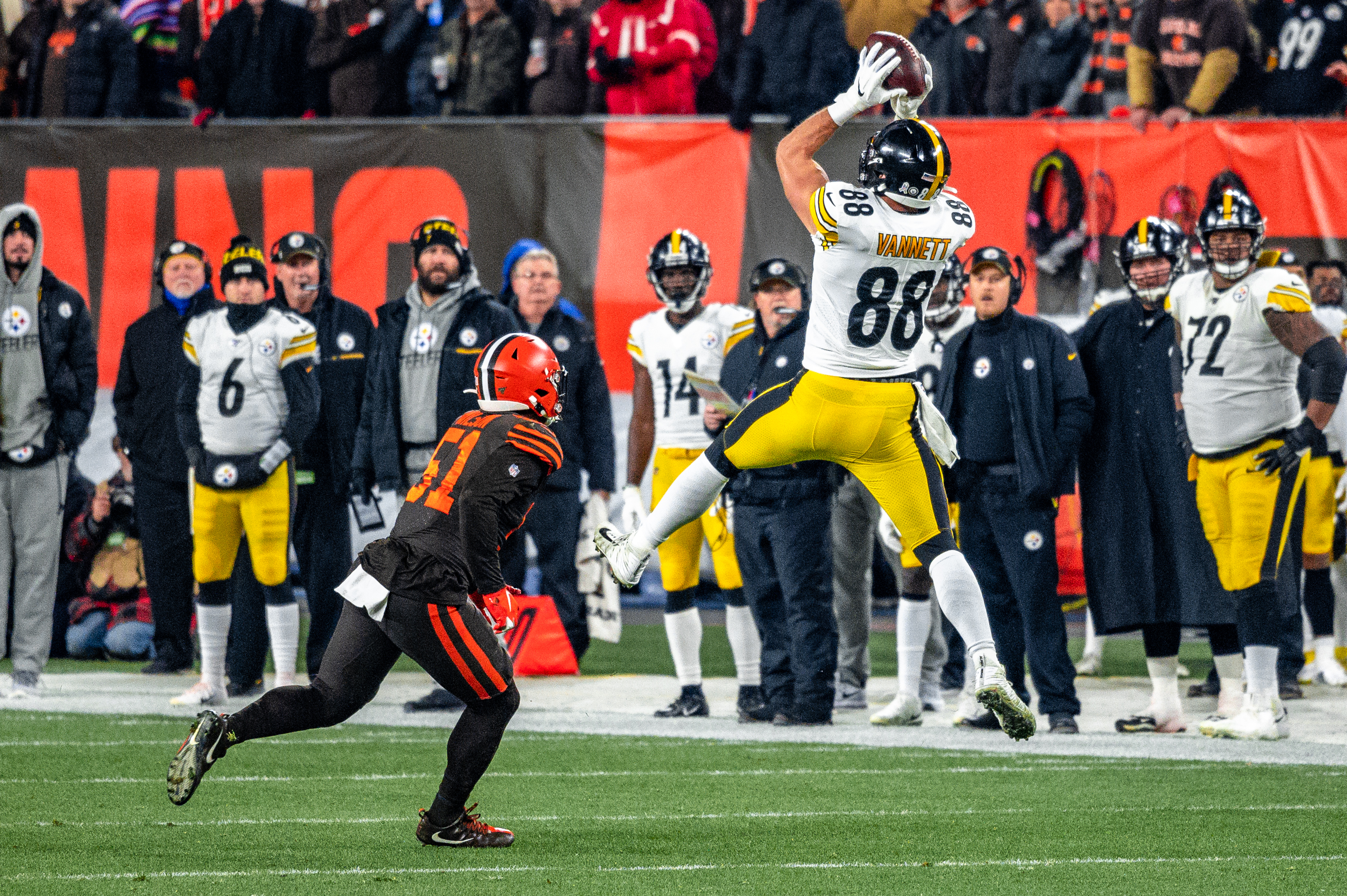
Vannett in a game against the Cleveland Browns in 2019

On September 24, 2019, Vannett was traded to the Steelers for a 2020 fifth-round pick. In the 2019 season, he finished with 17 receptions for 166 yards in 16 games and seven starts.

=== Denver Broncos ===
On April 2, 2020, the Denver Broncos signed Vannett to a two-year, $5.7 million contract. In the regular season, Vannett had 14 receptions for 95 yards and one touchdown over 15 games (11 starts).

Vannett was released by the Broncos on March 23, 2021.

=== New Orleans Saints ===
On March 29, 2021, Vannett signed a three-year contract with the Saints. He was placed on injured reserve due to a knee injury on September 6. Vannett was activated on November 11. In the regular season, Vannett recorded nine receptions for 133 yards and a touchdown across seven appearances (including two starts).

Vannett played in three games for New Orleans during the 2022 season, recording two receptions for 13 scoreless yards. Vannett was released by the Saints on November 19, 2022.

=== New York Giants ===
On November 22, 2022, the New York Giants signed Vannett to their practice squad. He was promoted to the active roster on December 3.

=== Houston Texans ===
On August 2, 2023, Vannett signed with the Houston Texans. He was released on August 29.

=== Los Angeles Chargers ===
On August 31, 2023, Vannett was signed to the Los Angeles Chargers' practice squad. On November 1, he was signed to the active roster. Vannett played eight games during the 2023 season.

=== Tennessee Titans ===
On May 13, 2024, Vannett signed with the Tennessee Titans, reuniting him with quarterback Mason Rudolph, who also played for the Steelers in 2019. He played all 17 games (10 starts) of the 2024 season, finishing with 17 receptions for 135 yards and a career-high three touchdowns.

=== Minnesota Vikings ===
On August 4, 2025, Vannett signed with the Minnesota Vikings. He was released on August 26 as part of final roster cuts. He was signed to the practice squad the next day. On September 11, Vannett was signed to the active roster. He was released on October 6 and re-signed to the practice squad three days later.

=== Los Angeles Rams ===
On November 26, 2025, the Los Angeles Rams signed Vannett to their active roster off of the Vikings' practice squad. Vannett played in six regular season games and one playoff game as the Rams reached the NFC Championship Game.

=== Seattle Seahawks (second stint) ===
On July 24, 2026, the Seattle Seahawks announced that they had re-signed Vannett. He was released by the Seahawks on August 30 as a part of final roster cuts.

=== Baltimore Ravens ===
On September 2, 2026, the Baltimore Ravens signed Vannett to their practice squad. On October 7, he was signed to the active roster. On November 10, Vannett was released and re-signed to the practice squad the next day.

== Personal life ==
Vannett graduated from Ohio State with a degree in sports industry.

== See also ==
- List of NFL players by most teams played for
