= DeShawn Shead =

American football player and coach (born 1989)

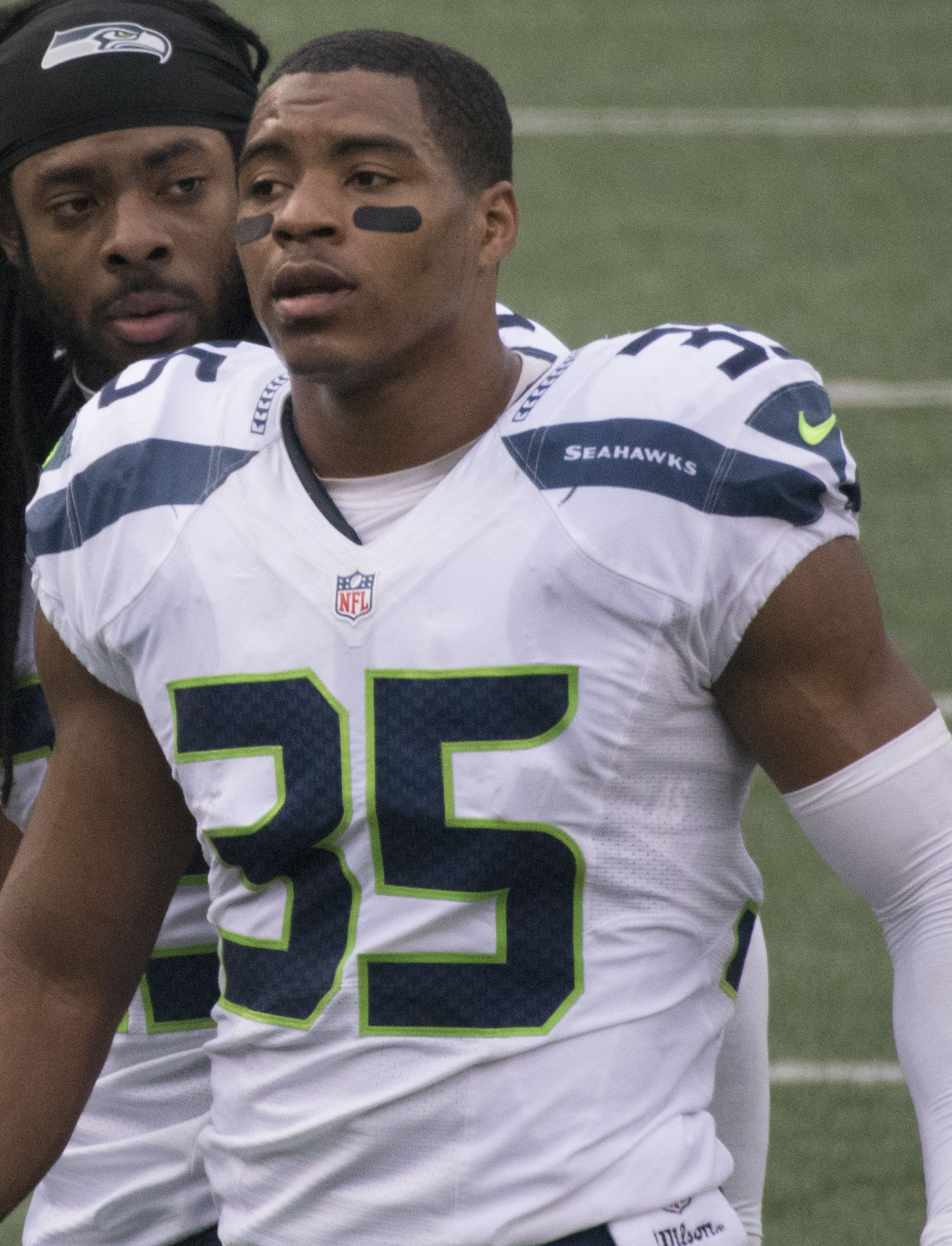
- Shead with Richard Sherman in 2015

Miami Dolphins
- Title: Assistant defensive backs coach

Personal information
- Born: June 28, 1989 (age 37); Palmdale, California, U.S.
- Listed height: 6 ft 2 in (1.88 m)
- Listed weight: 216 lb (98 kg)

Career information
- Position: Cornerback (No. 35, 26)
- High school: Highland (Palmdale, California)
- College: Portland State
- NFL draft: 2012: undrafted

Career history

Playing
- Seattle Seahawks (2012–2017); Detroit Lions (2018); Seattle Seahawks (2019)*; New Orleans Saints (2019)
- * Offseason or practice squad member only

Coaching
- Seattle Seahawks (2021–2023) Defensive assistant & assistant defensive backs coach; Miami Dolphins (2024–present) Assistant defensive backs coach

Awards and highlights
- Super Bowl champion (XLVIII)

Career NFL statistics
- Total tackles: 171
- Sacks: 1.0
- Forced fumbles: 4
- Pass deflections: 24
- Interceptions: 2
- Stats at Pro Football Reference

DeShawn Anthony Shead (born June 28, 1989) is an American former professional football cornerback and coach who is the assistant defensive backs coach for the Miami Dolphins of the National Football League (NFL). He signed with the Seahawks as an undrafted free agent in 2012, and became a member of the Legion of Boom. He also won Super Bowl XLVIII with the Seahawks over the Denver Broncos. Shead spent the 2018 season with the Detroit Lions, before re-signing with the Seahawks in 2019.

== Early life ==
Born and raised in Palmdale, California, Shead attended Highland High School and was a two-time All-Conference and All-CIF Southern Section defensive back. He was named the winner of the 2006 National Football Foundation Scholar Athlete award. He also competed in track and field at Highland, and still holds the school pole vault record.

== College career ==
Shead played college football at Portland State; he redshirted as a true freshman in 2007, and was named PSU Most Outstanding Defensive Back for the next four seasons. He was second-team All-Big Sky Conference as a junior and was on the first-team as a senior in 2011. He also competed in the decathlon on the Vikings track team.

== Professional career ==
Pre-draft measurables
Height	Weight	40-yard dash	10-yard split	20-yard split	20-yard shuttle	Three-cone drill	Vertical jump	Broad jump	Bench press
6 ft 1 1/8 in (1.86 m)	220 lb (100 kg)	4.53 s	1.59 s	2.71 s	4.23 s	6.76 s	38.0 in (0.97 m)	10 ft 1 in (3.07 m)	24 reps
All values from Pro Day

=== Seattle Seahawks (first stint) ===
On April 29, 2012, Shead signed with the Seahawks as an undrafted free agent. On August 31, he was released, then was signed to the practice squad the following day. On November 27, 2013, Shead was promoted to the active roster from the practice squad, and participated in Super Bowl XLVIII in February 2014, as the Seahawks defeated the Denver Broncos 43–8.

After Seattle's loss in Super Bowl XLIX in February 2015, cornerback Byron Maxwell left for Philadelphia in free agency, leaving a starting position open opposite All-Pro CB Richard Sherman. The Seahawks signed Cary Williams in the offseason, but he was benched in Week 12 and later released. With Jeremy Lane and Tharold Simon still recovering from injuries, Shead was inserted as the second cornerback against Pittsburgh in place of Williams, and played well enough to earn the starting job full-time.

In Week 17, Shead recorded his first interception against the Arizona Cardinals, picking off quarterback Drew Stanton in the endzone. He finished the game with an interception, a tackle, and a pass deflection.

In the divisional round of the 2016 playoffs, Shead suffered a torn ACL in the 36–20 loss to the Atlanta Falcons. He re-signed with the Seahawks on March 17, 2017, and was placed on the physically unable to perform list to start the season. He was activated off the PUP list on December 23, 2017.

On March 12, 2018, Shead was released by the Seahawks.

=== Detroit Lions ===
On March 14, 2018, the Detroit Lions signed Shead to a one-year contract worth $3.5 million, with an additional $3 million in incentives. Despite being projected by many analysts to be one of the team's starting cornerbacks for the 2018 season, Shead did not make the 53-man roster and was released on September 1, 2018. He was re-signed on September 19, 2018. He played in 12 games before being placed on injured reserve on December 29, 2018.

=== Seattle Seahawks (second stint) ===
On July 27, 2019, Shead signed with the Seahawks. He was released on August 31, 2019.

=== New Orleans Saints ===
On December 24, 2019, Shead was signed by the New Orleans Saints, but was released four days later.

== NFL career statistics ==
Legend
**Bold**	Career high

=== Regular season ===
Year	Team	Games		Tackles					Interceptions					Fumbles			
Year	Team	GP	GS	Cmb	Solo	Ast	Sck	TFL	Int	Yds	TD	Lng	PD	FF	FR	Yds	TD
2013	SEA	5	0	2	2	0	0.0	0	0	0	0	0	0	0	0	0	0
2014	SEA	**16**	1	13	11	2	0.0	0	0	0	0	0	2	0	0	0	0
2015	SEA	**16**	6	55	43	12	**1.0**	**3**	**1**	**40**	0	**40**	8	**2**	0	0	0
2016	SEA	15	**15**	**81**	**57**	**24**	0.0	0	**1**	2	0	2	**14**	1	0	0	0
2017	SEA	2	0	2	2	0	0.0	0	0	0	0	0	0	0	0	0	0
2018	DET	12	1	18	13	5	0.0	0	0	0	0	0	0	1	0	0	0
		66	23	171	128	43	1.0	3	2	42	0	40	24	4	0	0	0

=== Playoffs ===
Year	Team	Games		Tackles					Interceptions					Fumbles			
Year	Team	GP	GS	Cmb	Solo	Ast	Sck	TFL	Int	Yds	TD	Lng	PD	FF	FR	Yds	TD
2013	SEA	**3**	0	2	1	1	0.0	0	0	0	0	0	0	0	0	0	0
2014	SEA	**3**	0	3	2	1	0.0	0	0	0	0	0	0	0	0	0	0
2015	SEA	2	1	**9**	**6**	**3**	0.0	0	0	0	0	0	0	0	0	0	0
2016	SEA	2	**2**	2	1	1	0.0	0	0	0	0	0	**4**	0	0	0	0
		10	3	16	10	6	0.0	0	0	0	0	0	4	0	0	0	0

== Coaching career ==
=== Seattle Seahawks ===
Shead was hired by the Seattle Seahawks as a defensive assistant / defensive backs coach on March 3, 2021.

=== Miami Dolphins ===
On February 13, 2024, Shead was hired by the Miami Dolphins as assistant defensive backs coach.
