= Ari Seth Cohen =

American photographer, filmmaker, and fashion blogger

- Born: San Diego, California, U.S.
- Education: San Diego Jewish Academy
- Alma mater: University of Washington
- Occupations: Photographer, filmmaker, fashion blogger
- Years active: 2008–present
- Known for: Advanced Style blog; Advanced Style (2014 film); Books highlighting fashion of seniors
- Notable work: Advanced Style, Advanced Love

Ari Seth Cohen is an American photographer, filmmaker, and fashion blogger. He is the founder of "Advanced Style", which produces media including a blog, a book, and a film about fashion in people over the age of 60.

== Early life and education ==
Cohen was raised in San Diego and attended San Diego Jewish Academy. He majored in art history at University of Washington. He developed a close relationship to his grandmothers Helen Cohen and Bluma Levine. After graduating he spent several years working various jobs in art sales, counseling, and retail management while helping to take care of his grandmother Levine.

== Advanced Style ==
He first began photographing after his maternal grandmother, Levine, died in 2008. She encouraged Cohen to move to New York City where she had completed graduate school at Barnard College in the 1930s. To cope with the loss, Cohen began street photography of people over the age of 60. This led to the creation of his Advanced Style blog in 2008. He features the style, creativity, and wisdom of fashion-minded individuals over the age of 60. In July 2015, Cohen relocated to Los Angeles. He has released three books featuring portraits and interviews and a coloring book as well. In 2014 Cohen released the Advanced Style documentary, which he made with director Lina Plioplyte, featuring the lives and style of many of his New York muses. The film played in theaters internationally and eventually on Netflix for several years after. Cohen has been invited to speak about his work all around the world, including a Ted X Amsterdam talk in 2014 and the Chicago Humanities Festival in 2020. Designer, Marc Jacobs cited Advanced Style for being the inspiration behind his fall 2012 collection and New York Times fashion director, Vanessa Friedman credited Cohen with starting a movement towards more inclusion of older models in the fashion industry. His 2018 book, Advanced Love, includes 40 profiles of elderly couples.

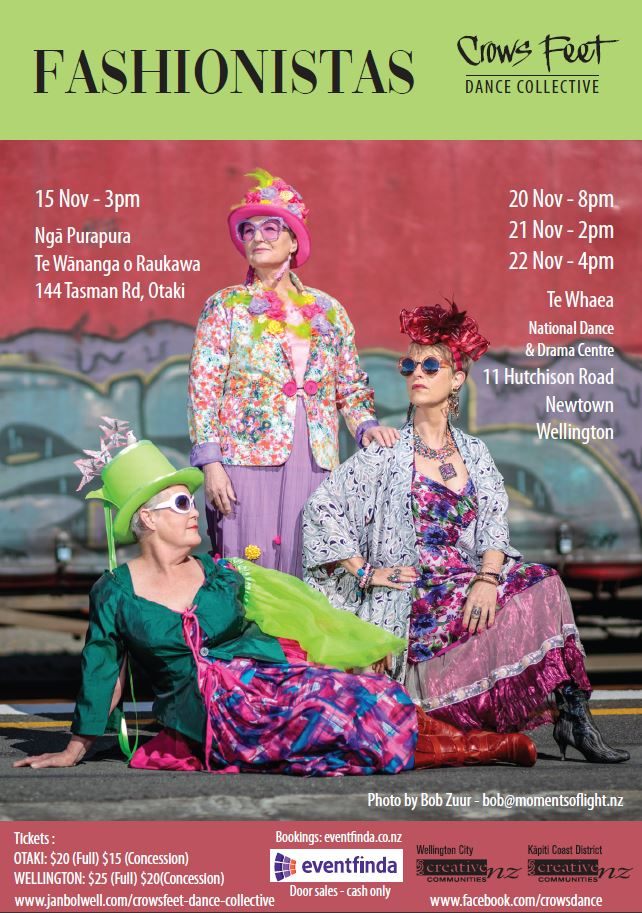
"The Crows Feet Dance Collective's 'Fashionistas' performance, inspired by the fashion of older women like Iris Apfel and Dame Anna Wintour, celebrates style and confidence. The event draws from Ari Seth Cohen's 'Advanced Style' series."

== Publications ==
- Cohen, Ari Seth (2012). Advanced Style. powerHouse Books. ISBN 978-1-57687-631-2.
- Cohen, Ari Seth (2016). Advanced Style: Older & Wiser. powerHouse Books. ISBN 978-1-57687-797-5.
- Cohen, Ari Seth (2018). Advanced Love. Abrams. ISBN 978-1-68335-412-3.
