= Nolan Frese =

American football player (born 1992)

No. 48
- Position: Long snapper

Personal information
- Born: July 29, 1992 (age 34); Fullerton, California, U.S.
- Listed height: 6 ft 2 in (1.88 m)
- Listed weight: 233 lb (106 kg)

Career information
- High school: Keller (TX)
- College: Houston
- NFL draft: 2016: undrafted

Career history
- Seattle Seahawks (2016)

Career NFL statistics
- Games played: 16
- Tackles: 3
- Forced fumbles: 1
- Stats at Pro Football Reference

Nolan Frese (born July 29, 1992) is an American former professional football player who was a long snapper in the National Football League (NFL). He played college football for the Houston Cougars.

== Early life ==
Nolan Frese was born in Fullerton but was raised in Roanoke, Texas and attended Keller High School before attending the University of Houston.

== Professional career ==
Frese signed with the Seattle Seahawks as an undrafted free agent on June 28, 2016 for a 3 year $1.62 million dollar contract. He beat out Clint Gresham and Drew Ferris for the Seattle Seahawks long snapping spot. On his first snap, Steven Hauschka made a 39-yard field goal against the Miami Dolphins. He went on to play all 16 games as the team's long snapper before being placed on injured reserve on January 3, 2017 after suffering an ankle injury in Week 17.

On August 2, 2017, Frese was waived by the Seahawks.
