= Mohammed Seisay =

American football player (born 1990)

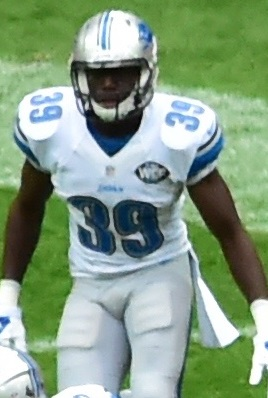
- Seisay with the Detroit Lions in 2014

No. 39, 21
- Position: Cornerback

Personal information
- Born: May 22, 1990 (age 36); Springfield, Virginia, U.S.
- Listed height: 6 ft 2 in (1.88 m)
- Listed weight: 202 lb (92 kg)

Career information
- High school: West Springfield
- College: Nebraska
- NFL draft: 2014: undrafted

Career history
- Detroit Lions (2014); Seattle Seahawks (2015–2016); Saskatchewan Roughriders (2017); Winnipeg Blue Bombers (2018)*; Memphis Express (2019); Seattle Dragons (2020)
- * Offseason or practice squad member only

Career NFL statistics
- Total tackles: 5
- Stats at Pro Football Reference

Mohammed Seisay (born May 22, 1990) is an American former professional football player who was a cornerback in the National Football League (NFL). He played college football for the Nebraska Cornhuskers. Seisay signed with the Detroit Lions as an undrafted free agent in 2014, and played for the Seattle Seahawks, Saskatchewan Roughriders, Memphis Express, and Seattle Dragons.

== Early life ==
Seisay attended West Springfield High School where he helped and contributed to his high school football team reach its first playoff appearance in fourteen years. He recorded 35 tackles, four interceptions, 10 pass defensed along with one forced fumble in 2007 and was named all-district first-team in high school.

== College career ==
Seisay started his collegiate career under Larry Porter at the University of Memphis. He later transferred to Nebraska, where he was named to the Nebraska Scholar-Athlete Honor Roll at Nebraska.

== Professional career ==
=== Detroit Lions ===
In 2014, Seisay was signed by the Detroit Lions as an undrafted free agent. On September 20, 2014, Seisay was promoted from the practice squad to the active roster.

=== Seattle Seahawks ===
On August 2, 2015, the Lions traded Seisay to the Seattle Seahawks in exchange for a 6th round draft pick in the 2016 NFL draft. Seisay joins the Legion of Boom, consisting of Richard Sherman, Earl Thomas, and Kam Chancellor and Jeremy Lane.

=== CFL, AAF, and XFL ===
Seisay signed with the Saskatchewan Roughriders of the Canadian Football League (CFL) on September 11, 2017, but was waived on September 26. He signed with the Winnipeg Blue Bombers on May 16, 2018, but was released before the start of the regular season on June 10. He signed with the Memphis Express of the Alliance of American Football on February 21, 2019, but was waived on February 27. On October 16, 2019, Seisay was selected by the Seattle Dragons in the XFL draft. He was placed on injured reserve on March 2, 2020. He had his contract terminated when the league suspended operations on April 10, 2020.

=== Statistics ===
Source: NFL.com

Year	Team	G	GS	Tackles					Interceptions						Fumbles	
Year	Team	G	GS	Total	Solo	Ast	Sck	SFTY	PDef	Int	Yds	Avg	Lng	TDs	FF	FR
Regular season
2014	DET	13	0	5	5	0	0.0	0	0	0	0	0.0	0	0	0	0
Total		13	0	5	5	0	0.0	0	0	0	0	0.0	0	0	0	0
