= Advanced Style (film) =

- Theatrical release poster
- Directed by: Lina Plioplyte
- Written by: Ari Seth Cohen; Lina Plioplyte
- Produced by: Ari Seth Cohen
- Starring: Lynn Dell Cohen; Ilona Royce Smithkin; Debra Rapoport; Tziporah Salamon; Jacquie Tajah Murdock; Joyce Carpati; Zelda Kaplan; Ari Seth Cohen; Iris Apfel; Dita Von Teese; Simon Doonan; Ricki Lake; Pat Taeb; Arianna Caprati; Stan Satlin; Marilyn Sokol; Sandy Cohen; Nancy King
- Cinematography: Lina Plioplyte
- Edited by: Yianna Dellatolla; Michael Carter; Hye Mee Na
- Music by: Kelli Scarr
- Production company: Dogwoof
- Distributed by: Bond/360
- Release dates: April 14, 2014 (Hot Docs Film Festival); September 26, 2014 (United States)
- Running time: 72 minutes
- Country: United States
- Language: English
- Box office: $207,231

Advanced Style is a 2014 American documentary film directed by Lina Plioplyte. The film details the history and values of the fashion blog of the same name, curated by street photographer Ari Seth Cohen, through the lives of seven unique New Yorkers whose style have guided their approach to ageing.

The film was released theatrically, digitally, and on DVD in the United States on September 26, 2014, by Bond/360.

== Synopsis ==
Seven New York City women, aged 62 to 95, are profiled in the film. All the women had been photographed by Cohen for his blog and through their fashion challenge convention ideas about beauty, ageing and obsession with youth. The film unpacks the private lives of its subjects and their personal philosophies on fashion, body image and self-confidence.

Advanced Style also documents the history of Cohen's blog, which had been originally started to cope with the loss of his maternal grandmother. Cohen explains that he believes beauty should not be the domain of the young, a statement agreed by Simon Doonan, Iris Apfel and Dita Von Teese who cameo in the documentary. The film also charts the women finding newfound fame due to Cohen's blog, which culminates with an appearance on The Ricki Lake Show.

== Reception ==
On Rotten Tomatoes, the film holds an approval rating of 89% based on 38 reviews, with an average rating of 6.90/10. The site's critics consensus reads: "Colorful, witty, and uplifting, Advanced Style celebrates life and pays tribute to those who flout convention." On Metacritic, it has a weighted average score of 66 out of 100, based on 11 reviews, indicating "generally favorable" reviews. Writing for the Los Angeles Times, Sheri Linden wrote, "The way the women occupy Cohen and Plioplyte's spotlight is a lesson in aging well, a lesson that begins with the refusal to play by the rule that says to grow older, especially for women, is to fade into the shadows."
