= San Diego Jewish Academy =

Coordinates: 32°56′04.04″N 117°13′33.71″W

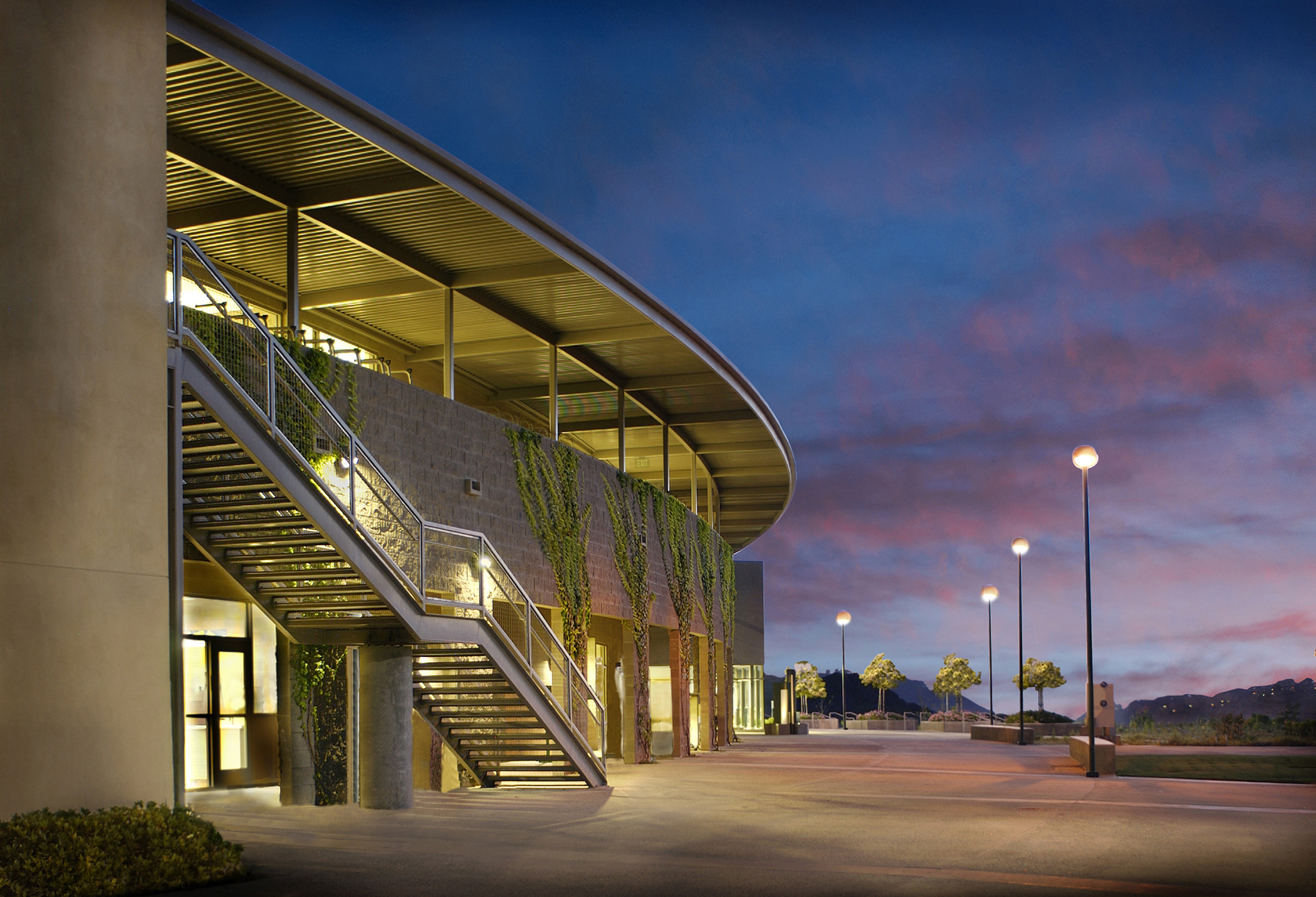

Location
- 11860 Carmel Creek Road; San Diego, California, United States

Information
- Type: Private, Co-ed
- Religious affiliation: Jewish
- Denomination: Pluralistic
- Established: 1979
- Head of school: Zvi Weiss
- Color: Blue/Gold
- Mascot: Lions
- Website: www.sdja.com

San Diego Jewish Academy (SDJA) is an independent Jewish day school in the Carmel Valley community of San Diego, California. The school is composed of three schools: SDJA Early Childhood Center, Golda Meir Lower School for grades K-5, and Maimonides Upper School for grades 6–12. SDJA is also home to Camp Carmel Creek, a K-5 summer camp that is open to the entire community.

As a pluralistic Jewish day school, SDJA is not affiliated with any one synagogue or movement of Judaism. SDJA is a pluralistic school and has "compacts" with several San Diego synagogues.

== History ==
SDJA began as a small neighborhood school in rented facilities on the property of Congregation Tifereth Israel in 1979.

In 1999, San Diego Jewish Academy built a 40-acre campus in Carmel Valley. The school is still located on this property, which has since been named the Jaffe Campus following a $7 million donation by the Jaffe family. As of 2013, SDJA is a 56-acre campus.

=== Football ===
In 2009, the San Diego Jewish Academy Lions were the first-ever Jewish football team in the United States. The team is made up of 11 players who have taken 25th place in their league and made an appearance in the CIF playoffs. In 2018, the Lions made it to the Finals of the CIF championship. In 2019, the Lions won the first league championship in school history and reached the CIF Finals for the second consecutive season. In 2021 SDJA’s Lions were undefeated and won both league and CIF division championships.

== Notable alumni ==
- Jacob Frank, Leadership roles at National Football League (NFL)
- Ari Seth Cohen, photographer and fashion blogger
- Drew Ferris (born 1992), football player for the Tampa Bay Buccaneers of the National Football League
- Lily Greenberg Call, political activist and former public servant
- David Schipper (born 1991), soccer player for Southland United of the New Zealand Football Championship
