= Garrison Smith =

American football player (born 1991)

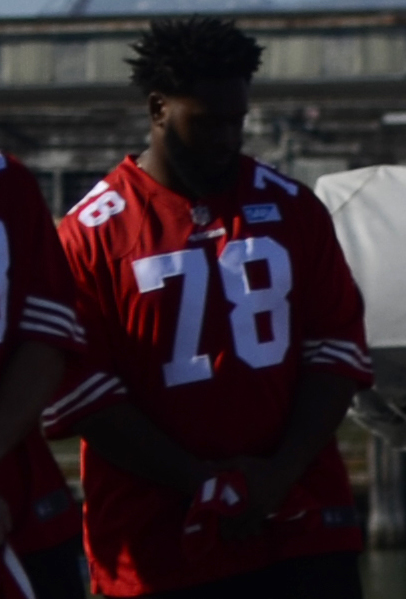
- Smith with the San Francisco 49ers in 2015

Arizona Wildcats
- Title: Graduate assistant

Personal information
- Born: October 9, 1991 (age 35); Atlanta, Georgia, U.S.
- Listed height: 6 ft 1 in (1.85 m)
- Listed weight: 295 lb (134 kg)

Career information
- High school: Douglass (Atlanta)
- College: Georgia
- NFL draft: 2014: undrafted

Career history

Playing
- Miami Dolphins (2014)*; New Orleans Saints (2014)*; San Francisco 49ers (2014–2016)*; Seattle Seahawks (2016–2017); Atlanta Falcons (2018)*; Arizona Cardinals (2018); Miami Dolphins (2018)*
- * Offseason or practice squad member only

Coaching
- Arizona (2021–present) Graduate assistant

Career NFL statistics
- Total tackles: 16
- Stats at Pro Football Reference

Garrison Smith (born October 9, 1991) is a former professional football player who was a defensive tackle in the National Football League (NFL). He played college football for the Georgia Bulldogs. He was signed as an undrafted free agent by the Miami Dolphins in 2014, and has also played for the New Orleans Saints, San Francisco 49ers, Seattle Seahawks, Atlanta Falcons, and Arizona Cardinals.

== Early life ==
Smith attended Douglass High School. As a junior recorded 108 total tackles, 27 tackles-for-loss and 14 sacks and seven forced fumbles. As a senior he recorded 80 tackles, 20 tackles-for-loss and 10 sacks. After the season, he was named to the 2009 PrepStar Top 150 Dream Team and SuperPrep Elite 50, All-America and All-Dixie teams as well as the Sporting News Top 100. He was also named to the Atlanta Journal-Constitution Top 50, Super 11 and Class AAAAA All-State First-team. He participated in the 2009 U.S. Army All-American Bowl. He was a Rivals.com four-star prospect, the third ranked defensive tackle nationally and ranked 79th overall nationally, fifth overall in Georgia. He was also a Scout.com four-star prospect, sixth defensive tackle in the nation 77th in the nation, seventh in the south. ESPNU.com ranked him the 15th best defensive tackle in the nation and 143rd overall in the nation. He was also named to the Press-Register Super Southeast 120.

== College career ==
Smith then attended Georgia where he majored in history.

As a freshman in 2010, he appeared in seven games. He recorded three tackles (two solo) and one tackle-for-loss. He was named to the SEC Honor roll. In 2011 as a sophomore, he appeared in 14 games with two starts. He recorded 22 tackles, three tackles-for-loss. As a junior in 2012 he appeared in 14 games with eight starts. He recorded 57 tackles, two tackles-for-loss and a fumble recovery. In 2013 as senior, he started all 13 games. He recorded 63 tackles (29 solo), 10 tackles-for-loss, six sacks, two forced fumbles.

=== Career statistics ===
College statistics
Year	Team	GP/GS	Tackles				Sacks	Pass defense		Fumbles		Safeties	TDs
Year	Team	GP/GS	Solo	Ast	Total	TFL	No	Int	PD	FF	FR	Safeties	TDs
2010	Georgia	7 / 0	2	1	3	1	0	0	0	0	0	0	0
2011	Georgia	14 / 2	11	11	22	3	0	0	0	0	0	0	0
2012	Georgia	14 / 8	27	30	57	1	1	0	0	0	1	0	0
2013	Georgia	13 / 13	29	34	63	10	6	0	0	2	0	0	0
Career		48 / 23	69	76	145	16	7	0	0	2	1	0	0

== Professional career ==
=== Miami Dolphins ===
After going unselected in the 2014 NFL draft, on May 12, 2014, Smith signed with the Miami Dolphins. He was cut on August 30. On September 1, he was signed to the Dolphins practice squad. However, he was released five days later.

=== New Orleans Saints ===
On November 27, he was signed by the New Orleans Saints. He was released by the Saints on December 16.

=== San Francisco 49ers ===
On December 23, he was signed to the San Francisco 49ers practice squad. He was signed to a futures contract a week later. He was released by the 49ers on September 5, 2015. The next day he was signed to the 49ers practice squad where spent the entire season. He re-signed with the 49ers on January 5, 2016. He was waived on September 3.

=== Seattle Seahawks ===
On September 4, 2016, Smith was claimed off waivers by the Seattle Seahawks. He was placed on injured reserve on October 18, 2016.

On September 2, 2017, Smith was waived by the Seahawks and was signed to the practice squad the next day. He was promoted to the active roster on September 19, 2017. He was waived by the Seahawks on November 28, 2017 and re-signed to the practice squad. He was promoted back to the active roster on December 12, 2017.

=== Atlanta Falcons ===
On April 17, 2018, Smith signed with the Atlanta Falcons. He was waived on September 1, 2018.

=== Arizona Cardinals ===
On September 2, 2018, Smith was claimed off waivers by the Arizona Cardinals. On September 18, 2018, Smith was released by the Cardinals.

=== Miami Dolphins ===
On October 2, 2018, Smith was signed to the Miami Dolphins' practice squad.

Smith was selected in the 9th round during phase three in the 2020 XFL draft by the New York Guardians.

=== Statistics ===
Year	Team	G	GS	Tackles					Interceptions						Fumbles	
Year	Team	G	GS	Total	Solo	Ast	Sck	SFTY	PDef	Int	Yds	Avg	Lng	TDs	FF	FR
2016	SEA	3	0	5	1	4	0.0	0	0	0	0	0.0	0	0	0	0
2017	SEA	8	0	9	6	3	0.0	0	0	0	0	0.0	0	0	0	0
Career		11	0	14	7	7	0.0	0	0	0	0	0.0	0	0	0	0

== Coaching career ==
In 2021 he joined the Arizona Wildcats as a graduate assistant.
