= Kache Palacio =

American football player and mixed martial artist

Profile
- Position: Linebacker

Personal information
- Born: January 30, 1994 (age 32); Gardena, California, U.S.
- Listed height: 6 ft 1 in (1.85 m)
- Listed weight: 237 lb (108 kg)

Career information
- High school: Junípero Serra (Gardena, California)
- College: Washington State
- NFL draft: 2016: undrafted

Career history
- Los Angeles Rams (2016)*; BC Lions (2016); Seattle Seahawks (2016–2017)*; Seattle Seahawks (2017); Inglewood Blackhawks (2021)
- * Offseason or practice squad member only
- Stats at Pro Football Reference

Kache Palacio (born January 30, 1994) is an American mixed martial artist and a former football linebacker. He played college football at Washington State University and was signed by the Los Angeles Rams as an undrafted free agent in 2016.

== Early life ==
Palacio was born in Los Angeles, California, grew up in a split family home with his father Emile Palacio in south central Los Angeles and mother Latinya Parker in Watts, California. He played linebacker for Westchester High School and Junípero Serra High School, where he was a three star recruit and rated 79th at his position nationwide.

== College career ==
In his time at Washington State, Palacio was able to rack up sacks, putting him 10th on the school's all-time list. He played in all 13 games for the Cougars in 2015, tallying 32 tackles, 10 for loss, with 5.0 sacks and two forced fumbles. In his WSU career, he recorded 26 TFLs, 17 sacks, and eight forced fumbles. Despite not being the most noticeable college prospect, he turned some heads at WSU's Pro Day, where he was asked to run drills as a fullback by teams such as the Indianapolis Colts, Seattle Seahawks, and Kansas City Chiefs

== Professional career ==
Palacio was not invited to the NFL Scouting Combine, so his pre-draft measurables were taken from Washington State's Pro Day. NFL Network analyst Gil Brandt reported that Palacio had an "overall good workout" and would be "top priority" undrafted free agent in the NFL.

Pre-draft measurables
Height	Weight	40-yard dash	Vertical jump	Broad jump	Bench press
6 ft 1 in (1.85 m)	237 lb (108 kg)	4.78 s	34 in (0.86 m)	9 ft 11 in (3.02 m)	21 reps

=== Los Angeles Rams ===
Palacio signed with the Los Angeles Rams as an undrafted free agent on May 4, 2016. He was released on May 18, 2016.

=== Seattle Seahawks ===
On August 7, 2016, Palacio signed with the Seattle Seahawks. He was waived on September 3, 2016, and was re-signed to the practice squad. He was released on December 27, 2016.

On April 17, 2017, Palacio re-signed with the Seahawks. He was waived on September 2, 2017. He was re-signed to the practice squad on November 22, 2017. He was promoted to the active roster on December 16, 2017. He was waived on December 19, 2017, and re-signed to the practice squad.

=== GDFL ===
In 2021 Palacio signed with the minor Gridiron Developmental Football League's Inglewood Blackhawks.

== Mixed martial arts career ==
Kache Palacio
- Height: 6 ft 2 in (1.88 m)
- Weight: 205 lb (93 kg)
- Division: Light heavyweight
- Reach: 73 in (185 cm)
- Fighting out of: Los Angeles, California
- Years active: 2020–present

Amateur record
- Total: 2
- Wins: 2
- By knockout: 1
- By decision: 1

Other information
- Mixed martial arts record from Sherdog

During his free agency, Palacio has been training mixed martial arts, and made his amateur debut on January 11, 2020. After two straight wins as an amateur, Palacio signed a contract with Lights Out Xtreme Fighting.

Palacio was expected to make his promotional debut at Lights Out Xtreme Fighting 5 on March 13, 2020. However, the event was tentatively rescheduled to be held on April 24, 2020, due to the COVID-19 pandemic.
