= Will Pericak =

American football player (born 1989)

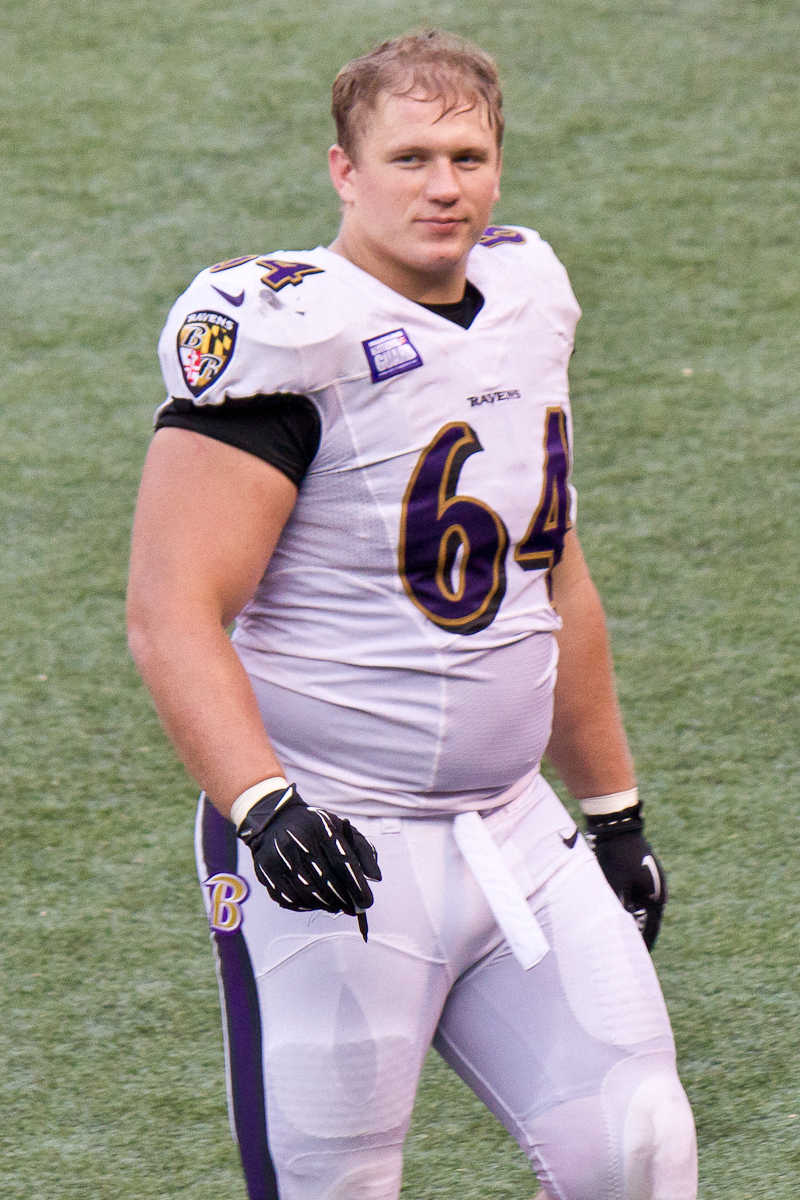
- Pericak at Ravens M&T Bank Stadium practice in August 2013

No. 64, 79, 69, 75, 63, 68, 73
- Position: Guard

Personal information
- Born: December 30, 1989 (age 36); Boulder, Colorado, U.S.
- Listed height: 6 ft 4 in (1.93 m)
- Listed weight: 300 lb (136 kg)

Career information
- High school: Boulder (Boulder, Colorado)
- College: Colorado
- NFL draft: 2013: undrafted

Career history
- Baltimore Ravens (2013)*; San Diego Chargers (2013)*; Jacksonville Jaguars (2013–2014)*; Denver Broncos (2014)*; Seattle Seahawks (2015–2017)*; Buffalo Bills (2017)*; Chicago Bears (2017–2018)*; San Diego Fleet (2019)
- * Offseason or practice squad member only
- Stats at Pro Football Reference

Will Pericak (born December 30, 1989) is an American former football guard. He played college football at Colorado.

== Professional career ==
=== Baltimore Ravens ===
Pericak was an undrafted free agent signed by the Baltimore Ravens. He was later released by the Ravens.

=== San Diego Chargers ===
Pericak was signed to the Chargers practice squad on September 2, 2013.

=== Jacksonville Jaguars ===
On December 23, 2013, he was signed to the Jacksonville Jaguars' practice squad. He was signed to the active roster at the conclusion of the 2013 regular season.

=== Denver Broncos ===
Pericak signed with the Denver Broncos during the 2014 offseason, but was waived by the Broncos on August 24, 2014.

=== Seattle Seahawks ===
On February 6, 2015, he signed a futures contract to the Seattle Seahawks. On September 6, 2015, Pericak was signed to the Seattle Seahawks practice squad.

On September 3, 2016, Pericak was released by the Seahawks as part of final roster cuts and was re-signed to the practice squad. He signed a reserve/future contract with the Seahawks on January 16, 2017.

On September 2, 2017, Pericak was waived by the Seahawks.

=== Buffalo Bills ===
On September 4, 2017, Pericak was signed to the Buffalo Bills' practice squad. He was released on November 6, 2017, but was re-signed five days later. He was released on November 27, 2017.

=== Chicago Bears ===
On December 5, 2017, Pericak was signed to the Chicago Bears' practice squad. He signed a reserve/future contract with the Bears on January 1, 2018. He was waived on September 1, 2018.

=== San Diego Fleet ===
On November 9, 2018, Pericak signed with the San Diego Fleet of the Alliance of American Football (AAF) for the 2019 season. He decided to retire after seeing how the league was set up.
