= Drew Ferris =

American football player (born 1992)

No. 46
- Position: Long snapper

Personal information
- Born: March 7, 1992 (age 34); Carlsbad, California, U.S.
- Listed height: 6 ft 0 in (1.83 m)
- Listed weight: 340 lb (154 kg)

Career information
- High school: San Diego Jewish Academy (CA)
- College: Florida
- NFL draft: 2015: undrafted

Career history
- New York Jets (2015)*; Seattle Seahawks (2016)*; Tampa Bay Buccaneers (2018)*; Orlando Apollos (2019)
- * Offseason or practice squad member only
- Stats at Pro Football Reference

Drew Ferris (born March 7, 1992) is an American former football long snapper. He played college football at the University of Florida.

== Early life ==
Ferris was born in Carlsbad, California, and is Jewish. His parents, Walt (a psychotherapist) and Pam Ferris (the chief executive officer of the non-profit Seacrest Village Retirement Community), did not allow him to play football until sixth grade. Ferris started high school attending La Costa Canyon High School in Carlsbad.

He finished his last two years at San Diego Jewish Academy in San Diego, California, graduating in 2010. While at San Diego Jewish Academy, Ferris was a two-way starter who played defensive end, offensive tackle, and middle linebacker in addition to first class water boy, he also played long snapping. On defense he had 77 tackles with 9.5 sacks and a fumble recovery, and on offense he ran six times for 21 yards and caught two balls for 13 yards. He was rated a 5-star long snapper and ranked 14th in the nation by Chris Rubio Long Snapping. He won the Coaches’ Award for hardest worker in Fall 2008, and was named to second-team All-Conference on offense and defense in Fall 2009. Ferris also earned varsity letters in basketball (his junior and senior years; he averaged 5.8 points, 6.3 rebounds, and 1.5 steals in 42 games) and baseball (his senior year). He was named to the San Diego Union Tribune All-Academic Team four times in high school.

Ferris completed a master's degree in the University of Florida's Master of Business Management program in December 2015.

== College career ==
Ferris initially enrolled at San José State University to play football as a walk-on. However, he then enrolled in September 2010 at the University of Florida in Gainesville, Florida, as a preferred walk-on where he was a member of coach Urban Meyer and coach Will Muschamp's Florida Gators football teams from 2010 to 2014, except that he missed all but one game in 2012 due to injury. He became the first Division-I male athlete from his high school. He was a long snapper in 38 games for the Gators.

In 2010, he red-shirted as a freshman. In 2011 he was the long snapper for both the field-goal and punt teams, playing in all 13 games, and was named to the Southeastern Conference (SEC) Academic Honor Roll. In September 2012 he suffered a season-ending injury to his left collar-bone in the first game of the season. In 2013 he was the team's primary snapper for punts and field goals, playing in all 12 games, and was again named to the SEC Academic Honor Roll. In 2014 he played in all 12 games as the Gators' longsnapper, recorded one tackle on special teams, and was again named to the SEC Academic Honor Roll.

== Professional career ==
Ferris went to rookie minicamp with the New York Jets in 2015.

=== Seattle Seahawks ===
On March 23, 2016, the Seattle Seahawks signed Ferris to their roster. The following day the Seahawks waived their former long snapper Andrew East. In May, the Seahawks signed Ferris to a three-year, $1.62 million contract. Ferris was on the Seahawks' roster in the summer of 2016, and was released on August 4, 2016.

=== Tampa Bay Buccaneers ===
On February 1, 2018, Ferris signed a reserve/futures contract with the Tampa Bay Buccaneers. He was waived on September 1, 2018.

=== Orlando Apollos ===
On October 15, 2018, Ferris joined the Orlando Apollos of the Alliance of American Football. He was waived on March 4, 2019.

== See also ==
- List of select Jewish football players
