= Ronnie Shields (American football) =

American football player (born 1991)

No. 48, 87
- Position: Tight end

Personal information
- Born: December 15, 1991 (age 34); Los Angeles, California
- Listed height: 6 ft 4 in (1.93 m)
- Listed weight: 245 lb (111 kg)

Career information
- High school: Stephenson (Stone Mountain, Georgia)
- College: Kentucky
- NFL draft: 2015: undrafted

Career history
- Seattle Seahawks (2016)
- Stats at Pro Football Reference

Ronnie Shields is an American football tight end who is currently retired. He played college football at Kentucky.

== Early life ==
Ronnie Shields was born in Los Angeles to Ron and Victoria Shields. Shields attended Stephenson high school in Stone Mountain and graduated in 2010. While at Stephenson high school Ronnie didn't begin playing football until his junior year.

== College career ==
Shields committed to University of Kentucky on October 30, 2009, and enrolled in June 2010. Shields was enrolled at Kentucky from 2010 to 2014.

== Professional career ==
Shields went undrafted in the 2015 NFL draft. Shields participated the Seattle Seahawks rookie minicamp in May but was not signed.

On January 4, 2016, Shields signed a futures contract with the Seattle Seahawks. On May 4, 2016, the Seahawks waived Shields. Shields was later re-signed May 9, 2016. On August 20, 2016, Shields was waived by the Seahawks with an injury designation.
