= Brandon Williams (tight end) =

American football player (born 1987)

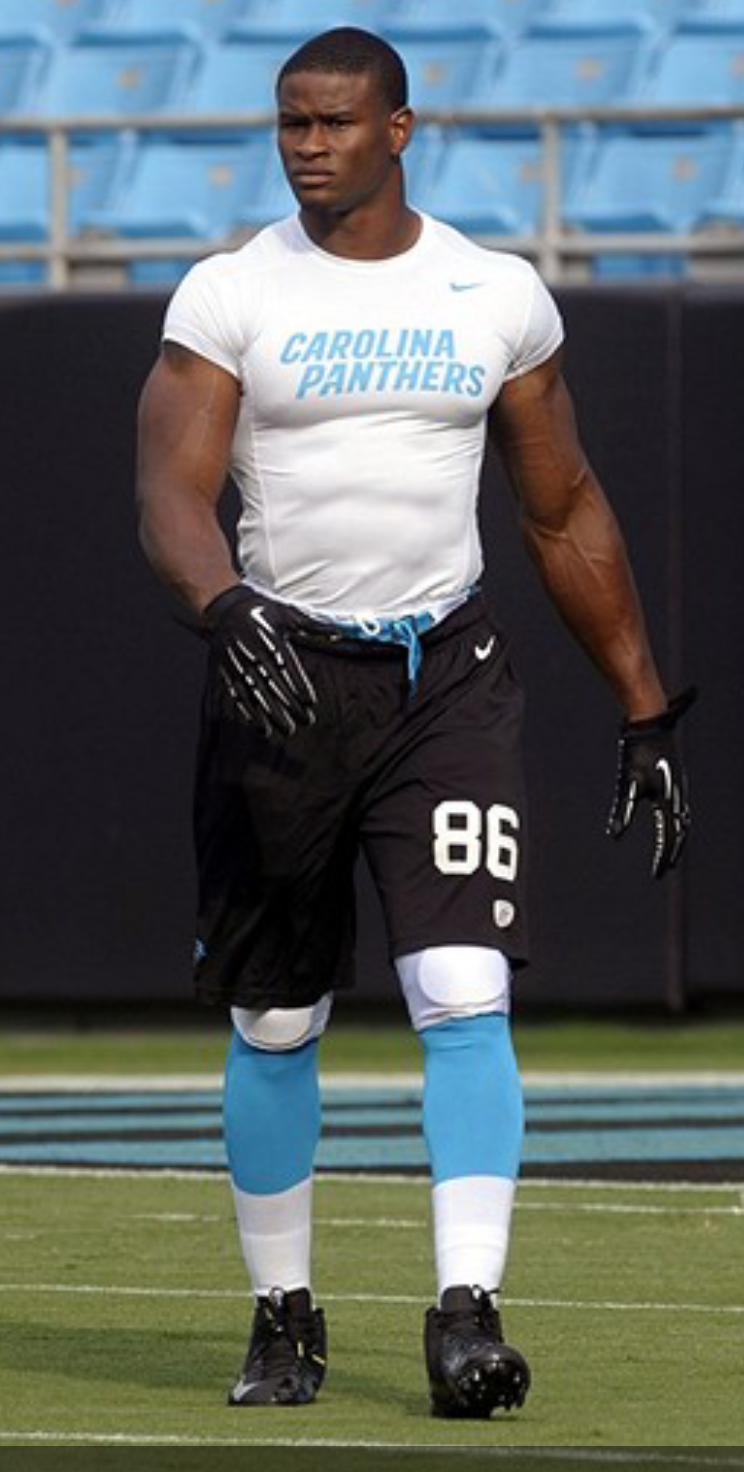

No. 85, 86, 88
- Position: Tight end

Personal information
- Born: October 12, 1987 (age 39); Chicago, Illinois, U.S.
- Listed height: 6 ft 3 in (1.91 m)
- Listed weight: 247 lb (112 kg)

Career information
- High school: Blue Island (IL) Eisenhower
- College: Oregon
- NFL draft: 2012: undrafted

Career history
- Carolina Panthers (2013–2015); Miami Dolphins (2015); Seattle Seahawks (2016); Indianapolis Colts (2017)

Career NFL statistics
- Receptions: 19
- Receiving yards: 201
- Stats at Pro Football Reference

Brandon Darnell Williams (born October 12, 1987) is an American former professional football player who was a tight end in the National Football League (NFL). He was signed by the Carolina Panthers as an undrafted free agent in 2012 after playing college football for the Oregon Ducks. He played basketball at Portland Bible College and won a Conference Championship in the 2013 season.

== Professional career ==
Pre-draft measurables
Height	Weight	40-yard dash	10-yard split	20-yard split	20-yard shuttle	Three-cone drill	Vertical jump	Broad jump	Bench press
6 ft 3 1/4 in (1.91 m)	248 lb (112 kg)	4.56 s	1.63 s	2.67 s	4.53 s	7.25 s	36.0 in (0.91 m)	10 ft 8 in (3.25 m)	26 reps
All values from Pro Day

=== Carolina Panthers ===
In 2012, after his basketball career at Portland Bible College, Williams entered the NFL draft. After going undrafted, he worked out for several teams and gained interest. He eventually signed with the Carolina Panthers in 2013.

On September 26, 2015, Williams was waived by the Panthers.

=== Miami Dolphins ===
On September 30, 2015, Williams was signed to the Miami Dolphins' practice squad. On December 5, 2015, Williams was waived. On December 8, 2015, he was signed to the active roster. On December 14, 2015, he was placed on injured reserve.

=== Seattle Seahawks ===
On April 28, 2016, Williams was signed by the Seattle Seahawks.

=== Indianapolis Colts ===
On March 20, 2017, Williams signed with the Indianapolis Colts. On September 3, 2017, he was released by the Colts, but was re-signed the next day after Erik Swoope was placed on injured reserve.

On September 17, 2017, in Week 2, Williams had his first reception as a member of the Colts, a 20-yard catch from quarterback Jacoby Brissett, in the 16–13 overtime loss to the Arizona Cardinals. In Week 15, Williams was hospitalized after suffering a serious head injury on a punt play. He was diagnosed with a concussion and was placed on injured reserve on December 22, 2017.
