= Jeremy Lane =

American football player (born 1990)

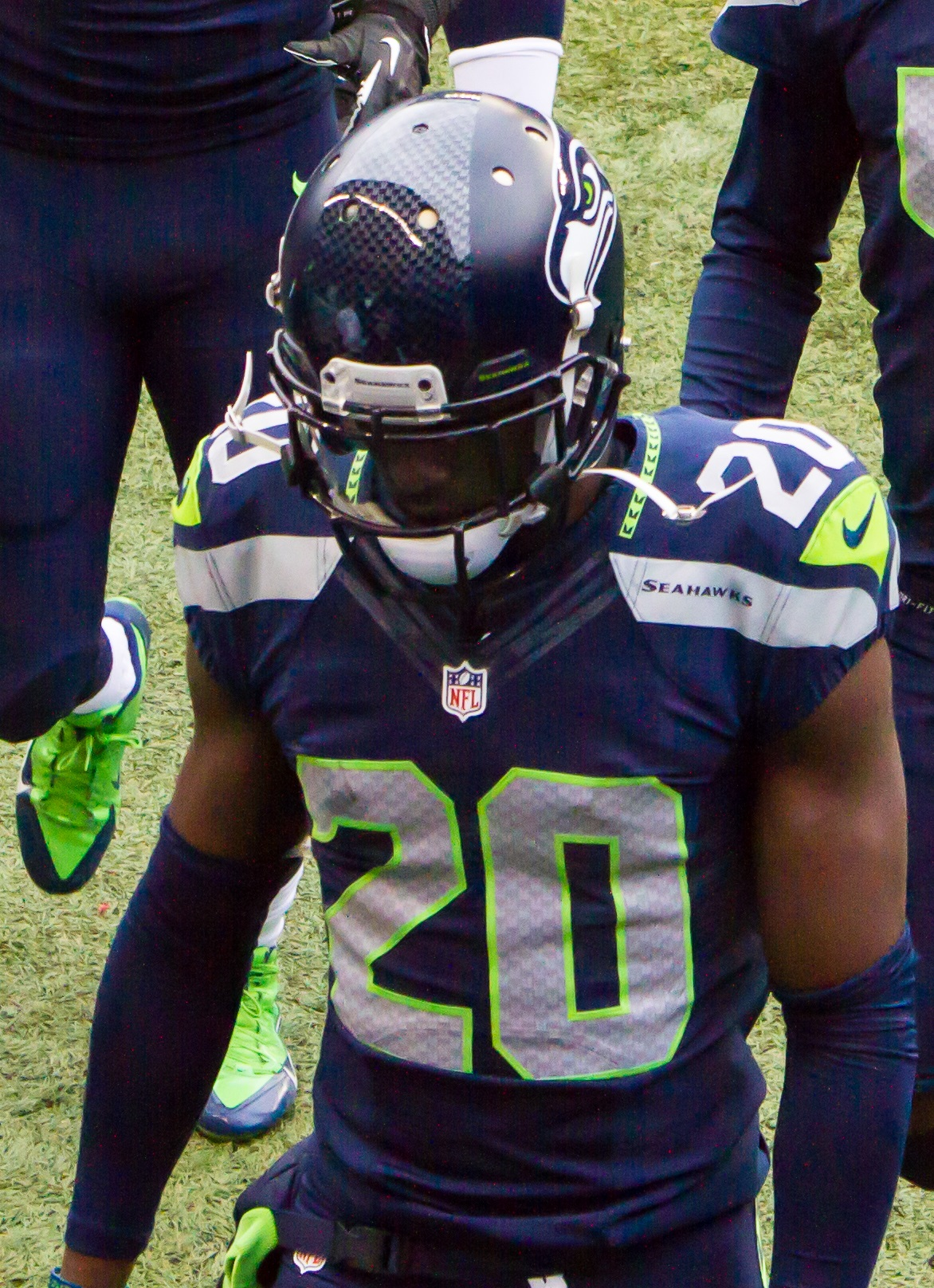
- Lane with the Seattle Seahawks in 2013

No. 20, 37
- Position: Cornerback

Personal information
- Born: July 14, 1990 (age 36); Tyler, Texas, U.S.
- Listed height: 6 ft 0 in (1.83 m)
- Listed weight: 190 lb (86 kg)

Career information
- High school: John Tyler (Tyler, Texas)
- College: Northwestern State
- NFL draft: 2012: 6th round, 172nd overall pick

Career history
- Seattle Seahawks (2012–2017)

Awards and highlights
- Super Bowl champion (XLVIII)

Career NFL statistics
- Total tackles: 146
- Forced fumbles: 1
- Pass deflections: 15
- Interceptions: 2
- Stats at Pro Football Reference

Jeremy Rashaad Lane (born July 14, 1990) is an American former professional football player who was a cornerback in the National Football League (NFL). He played college football for the Northwestern State Demons and was selected by the Seattle Seahawks in the sixth round of the 2012 NFL draft. He became a member of the Legion of Boom, and was part of Seattle's Super Bowl XLVIII-winning team.

== Professional career ==
Pre-draft measurables
Height	Weight	Arm length	Wingspan	40-yard dash	10-yard split	20-yard split	20-yard shuttle	Three-cone drill	Vertical jump	Broad jump	Bench press
6 ft 0 in (1.83 m)	190 lb (86 kg)	32 1/2 in (0.83 m)	6 ft 6 in (1.98 m)	4.48 s	1.58 s	2.59 s	4.14 s	7.02 s	42.0 in (1.07 m)	10 ft 10 in (3.30 m)	12 reps
All values from Pro Day

On April 28, 2012, Lane was selected by the Seattle Seahawks with the 172nd pick overall in the sixth round of the 2012 NFL draft. On May 7, 2012, he agreed to contract terms. During the 2013 NFL season, Lane won his first Super Bowl ring as a member of the Seahawks. In Super Bowl XLVIII, the Seahawks defeated the Denver Broncos by a score of 43–8. Lane suffered a groin injury in Week 1 of the 2014 season against the Green Bay Packers.

Lane recorded his first career interception in Super Bowl XLIX, picking off quarterback Tom Brady on a pass at the goal-line in the first quarter. The play proved costly as on the interception return, Lane suffered a severe arm injury and a torn ACL after being tackled by Julian Edelman during the return of the interception; he did not return to the game which they later lost 28–24 to the Patriots.

After missing the first 11 weeks of the 2015 season, Lane returned to the Seahawks in their Week 12 victory over the Pittsburgh Steelers. Lane recorded an interception in his first quarter, picking off backup quarterback Landry Jones on a fake field goal attempt.

On March 9, 2016, Lane re-signed with the Seahawks on a four-year contract.

On September 10, 2017, Lane was ejected from the Seahawks season opener against the Green Bay Packers during the first quarter in an incident with wide receiver Davante Adams.

On October 30, 2017, Lane was traded along with two draft picks (a 2018 fifth-rounder and a 2019 second-rounder) to the Houston Texans for offensive tackle Duane Brown. However, the following day, it was reported Lane had failed his physical and would no longer be part of the trade, and instead the Seahawks would send a third-rounder in 2018 (Martinas Rankin) and second-rounder in 2019 in exchange for Brown and a 2018 fifth round pick.

On March 9, 2018, Lane was released by the Seahawks, along with fellow cornerback Richard Sherman.

On July 25, 2019, he signed with the SoCal Coyotes, a professional developmental football program in Palm Springs, California, to "keep himself game-ready" for future NFL opportunities.

== NFL career statistics ==
Legend
**Bold**	Career high

=== Regular season ===
Year	Team	Games		Tackles					Interceptions					Fumbles			
Year	Team	GP	GS	Cmb	Solo	Ast	Sck	TFL	Int	Yds	TD	Lng	PD	FF	FR	Yds	TD
2012	SEA	13	3	15	8	7	0.0	**1**	0	0	0	0	0	0	0	0	0
2013	SEA	15	0	25	18	7	0.0	**1**	0	0	0	0	4	0	0	0	0
2014	SEA	7	1	13	9	4	0.0	**1**	0	0	0	0	2	**1**	0	0	0
2015	SEA	6	2	13	11	2	0.0	0	**2**	**60**	0	**54**	**6**	0	0	0	0
2016	SEA	**16**	**9**	**49**	**36**	**13**	0.0	0	0	0	0	0	3	0	0	0	0
2017	SEA	13	6	31	21	10	0.0	0	0	0	0	0	0	0	0	0	0
		70	21	146	103	43	0.0	3	2	60	0	54	15	1	0	0	0

=== Playoffs ===
Year	Team	Games		Tackles					Interceptions					Fumbles			
Year	Team	GP	GS	Cmb	Solo	Ast	Sck	TFL	Int	Yds	TD	Lng	PD	FF	FR	Yds	TD
2012	SEA	2	0	2	1	1	0.0	0	0	0	0	0	0	0	0	0	0
2013	SEA	**3**	0	4	2	2	0.0	0	0	0	0	0	0	0	0	0	0
2014	SEA	**3**	0	**10**	**7**	**3**	0.0	0	**1**	**14**	0	**14**	**1**	0	0	0	0
2015	SEA	2	**1**	4	2	2	0.0	0	0	0	0	0	**1**	0	0	0	0
2016	SEA	2	**1**	7	5	2	0.0	0	0	0	0	0	0	0	0	0	0
		12	2	27	17	10	0.0	0	1	14	0	14	2	0	0	0	0
