= Kris Richard =

American football player and coach (born 1979)

Stanford Cardinal
- Title: Defensive coordinator

Personal information
- Born: October 28, 1979 (age 47); Carson, California, U.S.
- Listed height: 5 ft 11 in (1.80 m)
- Listed weight: 190 lb (86 kg)

Career information
- High school: Junípero Serra (Gardena, California)
- College: USC (1998–2001)
- NFL draft: 2002: 3rd round, 85th overall pick

Career history

Playing
- Seattle Seahawks (2002–2004); Miami Dolphins (2005)*; San Francisco 49ers (2005–2006); Oakland Raiders (2007)*
- * Offseason or practice squad member only

Coaching
- USC (2008–2009) Graduate assistant; Seattle Seahawks (2010–2017); Assistant defensive backs coach (2010); Cornerbacks coach (2011); Defensive backs coach (2012–2014); Defensive coordinator (2015–2017); Dallas Cowboys (2018–2019) Defensive backs coach & passing game coordinator; New Orleans Saints (2021–2022); Defensive backs coach (2021); Co-defensive coordinator & secondary coach (2022); Jacksonville Jaguars (2024) Defensive backs coach; Stanford (2026–present) Defensive coordinator & defensive backs coach

Awards and highlights
- Super Bowl champion (XLVIII)

Career NFL statistics
- Total tackles: 54
- Sacks: 1.0
- Forced fumbles: 1
- Pass deflections: 2
- Stats at Pro Football Reference
- Coaching profile at Pro Football Reference

Kris Richard (born October 28, 1979) is an American football coach and former player who is the defensive coordinator for the Stanford Cardinal. He previously served as an assistant coach for the Jacksonville Jaguars, Dallas Cowboys, Seattle Seahawks, and New Orleans Saints.

== Playing career ==
=== High school ===
Richard prepped at Serra High School in Gardena, California.

=== College ===
Richard attended the University of Southern California, where he played college football as a cornerback under coach Paul Hackett and Pete Carroll from 1998 to 2001.

=== National Football League ===
Pre-draft measurables
Height	Weight	Arm length	Hand span	40-yard dash	10-yard split	20-yard split	20-yard shuttle	Vertical jump	Broad jump	Bench press
5 ft 11 in (1.80 m)	186 lb (84 kg)	29 1/8 in (0.74 m)	9 1/4 in (0.23 m)	4.42 s	1.55 s	2.54 s	4.15 s	39.5 in (1.00 m)	10 ft 0 in (3.05 m)	10 reps
All values from NFL Combine

He was drafted by the Seattle Seahawks in the 3rd round (85th overall) in the 2002 NFL draft. He played for the Seahawks for three seasons. He was traded to the Miami Dolphins for Ronald Flemons in 2005. He was signed by the San Francisco 49ers in 2005 and the Oakland Raiders in 2007.

== Coaching career ==
=== USC ===
Richard was hired in 2008 by Carroll as a graduate assistant coach for the USC secondary (defensive backs).

=== Seattle Seahawks ===
He followed Carroll to the NFL and joined his former team, the Seahawks, as secondary coach. Richard was instrumental to the formation of the Legion of Boom defensive secondary. He helped coach and develop players such as Richard Sherman, Earl Thomas, Kam Chancellor, Brandon Browner, Byron Maxwell and for his rookie season only, Shaquill Griffin. Bleacher Report described the Legion of Boom's accomplishments as a credit not only to Richard, but to Carroll, who was a safety himself in his playing days and began his coaching career as a secondary coach. He won his first Super Bowl title when the Seahawks defeated the Denver Broncos in Super Bowl XLVIII.

After losing Super Bowl XLIX, the Seahawks promoted Richard to defensive coordinator to replace Dan Quinn, who had left to become the head coach for the Atlanta Falcons.

As the defensive coordinator for the Seahawks, Richard's defense ranked first in points allowed for the 2015 season, third in 2016 and thirteenth in 2017.

Richard was relieved of his defensive coordinator duties following the 2017 season.

=== Dallas Cowboys ===
On January 22, 2018, Richard was hired by the Dallas Cowboys as their passing game coordinator and defensive backs coach. He was credited with the decision to move Byron Jones to cornerback fulltime, who went on to receive Pro Bowl honors. He was given the defensive play-calling duties from defensive coordinator Rod Marinelli. During his time with the Cowboys he was seen as a head coach candidate around the league and had interviews with 4 teams (Buccaneers, Jets, Dolphins and Giants). On January 13, 2020, it was reported that Richard would not be retained by Dallas following the removal of head coach Jason Garrett.

=== New Orleans Saints ===
On February 2, 2021, Richard was hired by the New Orleans Saints as their defensive backs coach under head coach Sean Payton, replacing Aaron Glenn, who departed to become the defensive coordinator for the Detroit Lions. On February 1, 2023, Richard parted ways with the Saints.

=== Jacksonville Jaguars ===
On February 22, 2024, Richard was named defensive backs coach for the Jacksonville Jaguars.

=== Stanford ===
On February 19, 2026, Richard was hired by Stanford as the defensive coordinator and defensive backs coach.
