= Legion of Boom =

Nickname for the early 2010s Seattle Seahawks defensive backfield

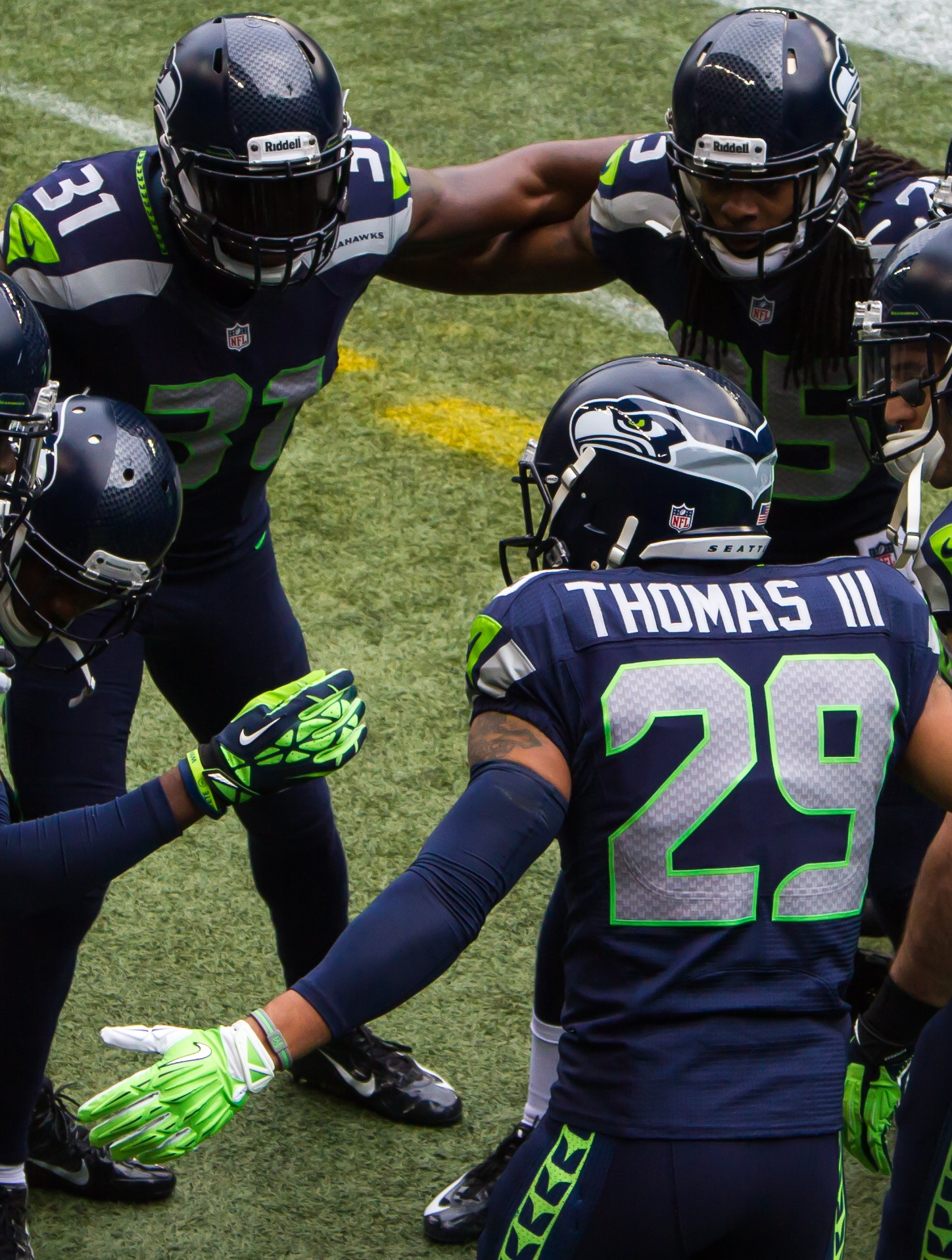
- The Legion of Boom (pictured here in 2013) included Chancellor (#31), Sherman (#25), and Thomas (#29)
- Abbreviation: LOB
- Formation: 2011–2018
- Members: Richard Sherman; Earl Thomas; Kam Chancellor; Brandon Browner; Byron Maxwell; Jeremy Lane; Walter Thurmond
- Parent organization: Seattle Seahawks

The Legion of Boom (LOB) was the nickname given to the Seattle Seahawks secondary in the 2010s. The original group that was nicknamed the Legion of Boom consisted of the starters in the Seahawks defensive backfield: Richard Sherman, Earl Thomas, Kam Chancellor, Brandon Browner, Walter Thurmond, and Byron Maxwell. Over time, the nickname grew to encompass the Seahawks defense as a whole, including prominent players such as Bobby Wagner, K. J. Wright, Michael Bennett, Cliff Avril, Malcolm Smith, Brandon Mebane, Frank Clark, Jarran Reed, Chris Clemons, Red Bryant, and Bruce Irvin. Other eventual starting members of the secondary included Jeremy Lane, DeShawn Shead, Tharold Simon, Marcus Burley, Bradley McDougald, Shaquill Griffin, and Justin Coleman.

During the Legion of Boom era, the Seahawks amassed six consecutive winning seasons, three division titles, two NFC championships, and a Super Bowl victory. They made the playoffs in five consecutive seasons (winning at least one game each appearance) and finished with five consecutive 10+ win seasons, a feat the franchise had never achieved in a consecutive season prior. They also appeared in back-to-back Super Bowls, winning once to secure the franchise's first ever championship.

During the 2012 to 2015 seasons, the Seahawks led the league in scoring defense, allowing the fewest points scored each year for four years straight. The only other team to accomplish this feat were the Cleveland Browns of the 1950s. The 2013 defense led the league in fewest points allowed (231), fewest yards allowed (4,378), and most takeaways (39), the first team to lead all three categories since the 1985 Chicago Bears. The 2013 unit is widely regarded as one of the best single-season defenses of all time.

Pete Carroll, with the help of defensive coordinators Gus Bradley and Dan Quinn and defensive backs coach Kris Richard, popularized the trend of Cover 3 defensive schemes during the LOB era. The defensive schemes they ran were fairly simple and relied on the athleticism and talent of the members of the secondary. During pregame warmups the players would often chant "Who's got my back? I got your back!" and "We all we got, we all we need!" The team's dominant, physical defensive play and blowout victories, particularly during the 2012 and 2013 seasons, made the defense feared amongst the league.

Some point out that the Legion of Boom forced the NFL to change certain defensive rules and that it changed what other teams look for when scouting talent at defensive back positions. The hard hitting tackling skills of strong safety Chancellor and the sideline-to-sideline, quick and maneuverable nature of free safety Thomas made them one of the most memorable safety duos in NFL history. Sherman was known for his loud trash talking and his highly intelligent ability to read offenses and force interceptions. Sherman was the NFL interceptions leader in 2013. Toward the latter part of Sherman's tenure with the franchise, many teams would avoid throwing to his side of the field entirely, in fear that Sherman may cause an interception. Maxwell had the ability to punch out footballs and force fumbles in a manner similar to cornerback Charles Tillman's signature "Peanut Punch".

== Background ==
Before the 2011 season, the Seahawks drafted cornerback Richard Sherman in the 5th round and cornerback Byron Maxwell in the 6th round of the 2011 NFL draft and signed cornerback Brandon Browner as a free agent from the Calgary Stampeders of the Canadian Football League (CFL), adding to 2010 draftees free safety Earl Thomas and strong safety Kam Chancellor. They first met during the 2011 NFL lockout at a charity basketball game put on by Jamal Crawford, and played good team defense together from the start. After an injury to Marcus Trufant and Walter Thurmond, Sherman earned his first career start on October 30, 2011, against the Cincinnati Bengals, marking the first time the four original members started a game together. The group's dominating play over the rest of the 2011 season would inspire the nickname. Browner, Thomas and Chancellor would all go on to make the Pro Bowl that year.

"It was a radio interview. The fans wanted to come up with a name for the group and we saw a bunch of names come across Twitter. None of them were catchy, but when we saw Legion of Boom, it jumped out."

— Kam Chancellor, explaining the origin of "Legion of Boom"

On August 2, 2012, safety Kam Chancellor was a guest on 710 ESPN Seattle's Bob and Groz show and asked fans to suggest a nickname for the Seattle Seahawks' secondary. The name "Legion of Boom" was suggested to the show by fans on Twitter and noting the way the secondary "brings the boom". It is also a play on the Legion of Doom supervillain group from DC Comics. Shortly thereafter, Google searches for the term skyrocketed. The term became commonly used in the media by the start of the 2012 season by sources like NFL.com and ESPN commentator Jon Gruden. Nike offered "Legion of Boom" branded apparel as the group grew in popularity. An ESPN feature found the "Legion of Boom" comparable to nicknamed great defenses such as the Purple People Eaters, Monsters of the Midway, Big Blue Wrecking Crew, Steel Curtain and the Doomsday Defense.

The unit's aggressive nature was notable in an era where the NFL had placed particular emphasis on player safety. Kris Richard, who served as defensive backs coach from 2012 to 2017 and as defensive coordinator from 2015 to 2017, helped build the Legion of Boom into a unit that hit hard while staying within the rules. During practice, the receivers ran routes with shields strapped to their chests that ran from neck to mid-thigh, and Richard taught the defensive backs to keep their hits within that area in order to limit penalties for blows to the head. Bleacher Report described the Legion of Boom as a monument both to Richard and head coach Pete Carroll, who was a safety himself in his playing days and a defensive backs coach in his early coaching career. Carroll also studied taller cornerback tandems like Mike Haynes and Lester Hayes when assembling the core of defensive backs.

Following the 2017 NFL season, the release of Richard Sherman and the career-ending injury of Kam Chancellor changed the Seahawks defense. Over seven seasons, the Legion of Boom's core had consisted of Sherman, Thomas and Chancellor, with the comings and goings of the cornerback opposite Sherman. At the start of the 2018 NFL season, only Thomas remained, but in a Week 4 win over the Arizona Cardinals, he suffered a season-ending broken leg (his second in three seasons), and would eventually sign with the Baltimore Ravens on March 13, 2019, ending the LOB era in Seattle.

== Super Bowl appearances ==
The Legion of Boom's crowning achievement was their team's 43–8 win in Super Bowl XLVIII, a blowout victory over the 2013 Denver Broncos, who were considered the best single season passing offense of all time and one of the best offenses in league history. The Seahawks became the fastest team to score in a Super Bowl when they had a safety 12 seconds into the game. They also became the first team to ever score with a safety, interception return for a touchdown and kickoff return for a touchdown in a Super Bowl. They led the game for 59 minutes, 48 seconds, which is the longest lead in Super Bowl history. It was the 3rd largest point difference in a Super Bowl (35 points) which was just one point less than the lead the Chicago Bears finished with in Super Bowl XX.

The season following the Seahawks' first Super Bowl victory, they made it back to Super Bowl XLIX but lost to the New England Patriots by four points when Patriots' rookie cornerback Malcolm Butler intercepted the ball with the Seahawks one yard from scoring the go-ahead touchdown and only 20 seconds remaining in the game. Former LOB starter Brandon Browner was playing for the opposing New England Patriots and was instrumental in jamming up the play and forcing the interception. Sherman, Thomas and Chancellor were all plagued by injuries before and during the game along with slot cornerback Jeremy Lane and defensive end Cliff Avril suffering injuries during the game.

== Members ==
=== Original LOB members ===
- Richard Sherman (2011–2017), at 6 ft 3 in, 205 lb, was the starting left cornerback, and most vocal member of the Legion of Boom. He started gaining notoriety in 2012 when he intercepted Tom Brady in an October 14, 2012, matchup that the Seahawks won 24–23. After the game, Sherman posted a picture of himself on Twitter looking at a seemingly dejected Tom Brady with the caption "U Mad Bro?". This encounter gave the Legion of Boom one of their first big wins and solidified the reputation of the defense for the first time. In 2013 Sherman led the league in interceptions (eight) and other teams started to take notice of his uncanny talent at cornerback. During the 2013 postseason, Sherman attained national attention after the 2013 NFC Championship Game when he made a game-saving pass deflection that was intercepted. After the game, he conducted a highly emotional interview with Fox Sports' Erin Andrews where he called out 49ers Receiver Michael Crabtree. The tipped ball Sherman caused that turned into an interception and won the game for Seattle became known as "The Tip" and is considered one of the most important moments in Seahawks fan history. Beyond Sherman's vocal personality, he was generally considered to be one of the best corners in football and was briefly the highest paid corner in football when he received his new contract from the Seahawks in 2014. Since coming into the league in 2011, Sherman had 30 regular-season interceptions (1st in NFL during that span), including 2 interceptions returned for touchdowns, 321 tackles, 89 passes defended, 1 sack, and 5 forced fumbles. He also recorded 2 interceptions in the playoffs (totaling 32 career interceptions). He had not missed a game in his NFL career until November 9, 2017, when he was out with an Achilles rupture. He was later released at the end of the season and signed with divisional rival San Francisco 49ers, with whom he made Super Bowl LIV (with a 31–20 loss to the Chiefs).
- Kam Chancellor (2010–2018), at 6 ft 3 in, 232 lb, was the tallest and heaviest safety in the NFL and was known for his hard-hitting tackles. He was taken with the 133rd overall pick in the 5th round of the 2010 NFL draft. During the Legion of Boom's run (2011–2018), strong safety Chancellor recorded 529 tackles, 12 interceptions, 41 passes defensed, 2 sacks, and 8 forced fumbles. Over that same span, he also has 3 postseason interceptions, including 1 returned for a touchdown. A 2017 neck injury sustained against the Arizona Cardinals (coincidentally in the same game where Sherman ruptured his Achilles) would end his playing career. After implying his retirement in July 2018 and missing the entire 2018 season, he was formally released in May 2019.
- Earl Thomas (2010–2018) was the shortest member of the Legion of Boom at 5'10", 202 lb. He was described by Sports Illustrated as "a great cover safety from anywhere to anywhere on the field, able to take ridiculous angles and read plays with microscopic precision". He was selected with the 14th overall pick in the 1st round of the 2010 NFL Draft. From 2011 to 2018, Thomas had 554 total tackles, 23 interceptions, including 1 interception returned for a touchdown, 56 passes defended, 9 forced fumbles, and 1 fumble recovery returned for a touchdown. Thomas also has 2 interceptions in the playoffs (totaling 25 career interceptions). He suffered a season-ending injury during a game on December 4, 2016, breaking his leg in a mid-air collision with teammate Chancellor. On September 30, 2018, Thomas suffered another fracture, in the same leg he broke in late 2016, after a touchdown by the Arizona Cardinals. It was then declared by Pete Carroll that his season was over. On his way back to the locker room on a cart, he proceeded to give the finger, seen as a comment towards the Seahawks organization, and indicating that his days as a Seahawk were over. Thomas would eventually sign with the Baltimore Ravens on March 13, 2019, as an unrestricted free agent, marking the official end of the Legion of Boom era.
- Brandon Browner (2011–2013), at 6 ft 4 in, 221 lb, signed with the Seahawks as a free agent in 2011 after a notable CFL career. He was the starting cornerback, along with Richard Sherman, in 2011–2013 and started in 36 games during that span for the Seahawks. Unfortunately, he was unable to play during the Seahawks' Super Bowl playoff run due to a suspension. Browner would leave the Seahawks and move to the New England Patriots in the 2014 season winning a Super Bowl against the Seahawks. The following season, Browner would join the New Orleans Saints. Browner briefly returned as a hybrid safety during the 2016 preseason, but was cut prior to the regular season.
- Byron Maxwell (2011–2014, 2017–2018), at 6 ft 1 in, 207 lb, Maxwell was drafted by the Seahawks in 2011 and was used primarily as a backup cornerback and on special teams from 2011 to 2012. He became an integral part of the secondary during the Seahawks' 2013 season and filled in for Brandon Browner during their playoff run which culminated in a victory in Super Bowl XLVIII. Maxwell started 17 games for the Seahawks and appeared in 47 before departing for the Philadelphia Eagles as a free agent in 2015. He returned to the Seahawks in 2017. Maxwell forced 12 fumbles in his NFL career (including playoffs), tied with Earl Thomas for most among LOB members.

=== Other featured ===
- Walter Thurmond (2010–2013), at 5 ft 11 in, 190 lb, was drafted by the Seahawks in the fourth round of the 2010 NFL draft. He primarily played nickelback for the Legion of Boom and started eight of 34 games for them during his four-year tenure with the team. Thurmond was an integral piece of the secondary during their Super Bowl season in 2013. After serving a four-game suspension, he returned and was tasked with defending the slot during the Seahawks' playoff run to the Super Bowl. Later in his career he switched to the safety position after leaving the Seahawks.
- DeShawn Shead (2012–2017), at 6 ft 2 in, 220 lb, signed with the Seahawks as an undrafted rookie free agent in 2012. Shead, a collegiate decathlon star, was a special-teams standout who excelled as the team's 'Swiss Army knife' multipurpose defensive back, and became the starter at right cornerback, opposite Sherman in 2014. He was a fast-and-physical player with elite body control, who displayed his prowess intuitively as a quick and reliable tackler against the run, and as a solid pass defender with excellent speed downfield. Shead demonstrated uncanny athleticism and had a knack for stripping the ball and forcing fumbles. When utilized as an additional weak-side 'bandit/hybrid' safety, or as a 'big nickel' defensive back, Shead matched up effectively against taller, larger and more physical receivers and tight ends. During the 2015 season, Shead started games at five different positions, designated as the primary backup at free- and strong-safety positions, both outside cornerback positions, and inside at nickelback, and ultimately earned the starting job at right cornerback.
- Jeremy Lane (2012–2017), at 6 ft 0 in, 190 lb, was drafted by the Seahawks in 2012, number 172 overall (6th round). Lane was a premier inside nickelback, possessing elite speed, quickness, and shadowing ability in coverage. His speed was well respected; he was one of the most dangerous gunners in special teams coverage, often double-teamed and deliberately forced out of bounds. Lane's skills as a defensive back afforded him advantages against smaller, quicker slot receivers and deep threats. Lane also recorded an interception in Super Bowl XLIX but was injured on the play. In his absence, backup cornerback Tharold Simon struggled mightily against slot receiver Julian Edelman, contributing to the Patriots' ability to make a fourth-quarter comeback. He was released along with fellow LOB member Richard Sherman in early 2018.
- Marcus Trufant (2003–2012), at 5 ft 11 in, 199 lb, was drafted by the Seahawks in 2003. Although only on the team for the Legion of Boom's infancy, he served a pivotal role in mentoring the team's young secondary from 2010 to 2012. He made the Pro Bowl for the Seahawks in 2007 and retired in 2013.

=== Post-LOB ===
The 2017 backups and starters included the Seahawks 3rd round pick out of UCF Shaquill Griffin, Justin Coleman whom the Seahawks acquired over a trade with the New England Patriots, returning veteran Byron Maxwell and Bradley McDougald, who was signed from free agency after leaving the Tampa Bay Buccaneers. Griffin and McDougald would prove to be very important players for the Seahawks defense that was without Richard Sherman and Kam Chancellor for the second half of the season.

Griffin, Coleman and McDougald all became starters for the Seahawks in 2018 with Sherman's departure to the San Francisco 49ers and the loss of Chancellor. Rookie cornerback Tre Flowers and safety Tedric Thompson also were brought in to fill in for former LOB players.

In 2019 (the first season without any original LOB members), the starters included Shaquill Griffin, Bradley McDougald, Tre Flowers, Quandre Diggs, Tedric Thompson as well as rookies Marquise Blair and Ugo Amadi. Griffin would go on to make the Pro Bowl.

In 2020 the Seahawks traded for safety Jamal Adams. Adams and Diggs would make the Pro Bowl that season, the first safety tandem to make the Pro Bowl together since Thomas and Chancellor in 2015. Adams would also set the NFL record for most sacks by a defensive back in a single season with 9.5 sacks while also being named second-team All-Pro. Other new 2020 players included cornerbacks D. J. Reed and Quinton Dunbar and safety Ryan Neal.

=== Backups ===
The other defensive backs on the Seahawks roster are also considered members of the Legion of Boom. Particularly following the suspensions of Brandon Browner in 2012 (four games) and 2013 (suspended indefinitely, but reinstated March 4, 2014), as well of that of Sherman (which he successfully appealed in December 2012), the term "Legion of Boom" has encompassed more than just the four original starters. At the Super Bowl parade in Seattle, Sherman called the Legion of Boom "more than the secondary, it's the linebackers, the defensive line, the entire defense."

The 2013 backups during their Super Bowl XLVIII-winning year were: Byron Maxwell (replacing injured starter Brandon Browner), Jeremy Lane, Walter Thurmond, Jeron Johnson and DeShawn Shead.

The 2014 backups during their subsequent Super Bowl XLIX year were: Jeremy Lane, Jeron Johnson, Tharold Simon, Marcus Burley, Steven Terrell and DeShawn Shead. After the 2014 season, Richard Sherman expressed his approval of two new Legion of Boom members: rookie Tye Smith, and veteran Cary Williams (who was subsequently released by the Seahawks after starting 10 games in the 2015 season).

Backups during the 2015 season were: DeShawn Shead, Jeremy Lane, Marcus Burley, Steven Terrell and Kelcie McCray. DeShawn Shead emerged as the starter at right cornerback.

The 2016 backups were: veterans Kelcie McCray and Steven Terrell, newcomers Dewey McDonald and Neiko Thorpe, and rookies DeAndre Elliott and Tyvis Powell. Terrell advanced to full-time starter at free safety after Earl Thomas suffered a broken leg during a game.

=== Linebackers ===
- Bobby Wagner (2012–2021, 2023), MLB
- K. J. Wright (2011–2020), OLB
- Malcolm Smith (2011–2014), OLB
- Bruce Irvin (2012–2015, 2020, 2022), OLB
- Heath Farwell (2011–2014), LB/ST
- Mike Morgan (2011–2016), OLB

=== Defensive linemen ===
- Michael Bennett (2013–2017), DE/DT
- Cliff Avril (2013–2017), DE
- Brandon Mebane (2007–2015), DT
- Jordan Hill (2013–2016), DT
- Frank Clark (2015–2018, 2023), DE
- Red Bryant (2008–2013), DT/DE
- Alan Branch (2011–2012), DT
- Kevin Williams (2014), DT
- Clinton McDonald (2011–2013), DT
- Chris Clemons (2010–2013), DE
- Tony McDaniel (2013–2014, 2016), DT
- Jarran Reed (2016–2020, 2023–present), DT
- Sheldon Richardson (2017), DT

== Accomplishments ==
=== Early success ===
The 2010 season saw the emergence of rookie safety tandem Earl Thomas and Kam Chancellor who were drafted in the first and fifth rounds respectively. Thomas would lead the team in interceptions with five. The Seahawks would win their division at 7–9 and host the defending Super Bowl champion New Orleans Saints. The game went on to be remembered as the Beast Quake game in NFL lore as the Seahawks upset the Saints 41–36. The following week they would go on to lose on the road to the Chicago Bears.

Following the 2011 season, Thomas, Chancellor, and Browner were named to the 2012 Pro Bowl. Thomas also earned AP All-Pro honors. Browner tied for fourth in the NFL with six interceptions. In every year thereafter, at least three members of the "Legion of Boom" have been named either AP All-Pro or voted to the Pro Bowl.

After the 2012 season, both Sherman and Thomas were named AP All-Pro. Sherman finished second in the league with eight interceptions. Despite this, he was snubbed from the Pro Bowl. Additionally, the team defense finished first in points allowed, and second in passing touchdowns allowed. The team would also go undefeated at home for the third time in franchise history. The team would make the playoffs with an 11–5 record and go on to beat the Washington Redskins on the road in the Wild Card round but would come up short the following week against the Atlanta Falcons in the Divisional round.

=== 2013 season ===
The Legion of Boom had a banner year in 2013. In the regular season, they allowed the fewest passing yards and passing touchdowns in the league while anchoring the league's best passing defense as well as overall defense. Sherman had eight interceptions for the second straight season, but this time it was good enough to lead the league in interceptions. Seattle finished the season with the most interceptions in the NFL. Sherman and Thomas were named first-team AP All-Pro, while Chancellor was named to the second team. Sherman, Chancellor, and Thomas were also named to the 2014 Pro Bowl, but did not play due to the Seahawks playing in Super Bowl XLVIII. In their rout of the Denver Broncos, they held Peyton Manning and the record-breaking Broncos offense to just eight points, intercepted Manning twice (including one by linebacker Malcolm Smith that was returned 69 yards for a touchdown), forcing two fumbles, and playing a major part in securing the first Super Bowl championship in franchise history.

In a Week 10 revenge game against the Atlanta Falcons, Seattle allowed 10 points and 226 yards in a 33–10 win. Thurmond would force and recover a fumble in the win.

Week 11 brought the Minnesota Vikings to Seattle, who managed 336 yards and 20 points, but committed 4 turnovers. Thurmond returned an interception 29 yards for a touchdown in the 41–20 win.

In Week 13, in a Monday Night Football game against the New Orleans Saints, the Seahawks faced off against the eventual #2 ranked passing attack in the league. They held the Saints to 188 yards in a 34–7 blowout.

In Week 15, the Seahawks shut the New York Giants out, winning 23–0. It was one of the best games of the season for the Legion of Boom, holding the Giants to just 181 yards of offense and intercepting Eli Manning 5 times. Byron Maxwell had two interceptions, as did Richard Sherman. Sherman also tipped a pass to Earl Thomas for an interception and recovered a fumble.

The next week, Seattle kept the Arizona Cardinals to 168 total yards and 17 points, and intercepted Carson Palmer 4 times (including two by Sherman). However, the Seahawks would fall 17–10, a late 31–yard touchdown pass from Palmer to Michael Floyd being the difference.

They would close the regular season strong, beating the St. Louis Rams 27–9 and allowing 158 total yards. Byron Maxwell would add an interception and the Rams would not score a touchdown until 4:18 remained in the game, with the game already decided.

In the divisional round, a rematch with the New Orleans Saints, the Saints did not score until early in the 4th quarter, although a late flurry got them 15 points and 409 offensive yards. Of note was the Seahawks holding tight end Jimmy Graham to a single catch for 8 yards. The Seahawks would win 23–15 off a botched lateral pass by Saints wide receiver Marques Colston on the game's final play.

For the third time that season, the Seahawks played the San Francisco 49ers. The Niners scored 17 points and gained 308 total yards, but Seattle survived 23–17 after forcing turnovers on all three of the 49ers' fourth-quarter possessions. Kam Chancellor picked off a pass to set up a field goal, and Richard Sherman tipped a pass to Malcolm Smith to clinch the game with less than 30 seconds left. This play and the immediate aftermath became infamous, for a brief shoving match between Sherman and 49ers wide receiver Michael Crabtree, Sherman's choke sign at QB Colin Kaepernick that he was later fined for, and his post-game rant in an interview with Erin Andrews.

The Seahawks saved their best for last with their performance in Super Bowl XLVIII, holding the Denver Broncos record-breaking offense to 306 yards and 8 points, forcing 4 turnovers and not allowing a score until the final play of the 3rd quarter. Kam Chancellor and Malcolm Smith each had an interception (Smith returned his 69 yards for a second-quarter touchdown), and Byron Maxwell forced a fumble. Smith won Super Bowl MVP, becoming the first defensive player to win the award since Dexter Jackson in Super Bowl XXXVII eleven years earlier.

The 2013 Seahawks allowed just one 300-yard passer, Matt Schaub in Week 5, and a second in the divisional round against Drew Brees. Eleven times in the regular season they held an opposing quarterback to less than 200 yards passing, then did it once more in the NFC Championship game. The team's 28 interceptions were most in the league, and 16 passing touchdowns allowed the second fewest.

On June 6, 2014, Richard Sherman won the Madden NFL 15 cover vote against Carolina Panthers quarterback Cam Newton. The rest of the LOB was featured on the games start menu.

=== 2014 season ===
During the 2014 season, the Legion of Boom helped their team reach their second straight Super Bowl, which ended in a loss to the New England Patriots, 28–24. Thomas, Chancellor, and Sherman were selected to the 2015 Pro Bowl, marking the second year in a row in which all three were named to the Pro Bowl together. Thomas and Sherman were again named first-team All-Pro while Chancellor was named to the second-team.

The Seahawks again allowed the fewest points in the NFL, the first NFL defense to accomplish this three seasons in a row since the 1969–1971 Minnesota Vikings. They also allowed the fewest yards, becoming the first defense since the 1985–1986 Chicago Bears to allow the fewest points and yards two seasons in a row. They allowed the fewest passing yards and passing touchdowns, though they ranked 20th in interceptions.

In Week 1, the Green Bay Packers scored 16 points and gained 255 yards in a 36–16 victory by the Seahawks. Byron Maxwell, now the full-time starter at left corner after Brandon Browner's departure, intercepted a pass by Aaron Rodgers in the game.

In Week 3, a rematch against the Denver Broncos, Seattle allowed 332 yards and 20 points, eventually winning 26–20 in overtime. Kam Chancellor forced a fumble and intercepted a pass by Peyton Manning.

In Week 8, another trip to play the Carolina Panthers saw the Seattle defense allow 9 points and 266 yards, just enough for the 13–9 win. Marcus Burley, a 5th corner forced into action due to injuries, was the key member of the Legion on the day with an interception off Cam Newton that he returned 24 yards.

In Week 9, the visiting Oakland Raiders scored 17 points on offense with 226 yards of total offense. Sherman intercepted his first pass of the season off rookie quarterback Derek Carr and also forced a fumble.

In Week 12, with the season on the line, the Seahawks beat the Arizona Cardinals 19–3. Allowing 3 points and 204 yards, the game featured a Byron Maxwell interception and Jeremy Lane forced fumble. This game began a six-game hot-streak for the Seahawks, particularly on defense, which would give up an average of 6.5 points for the remainder of the year and allow fewer than 250 total yards in all six games.

In Week 13, they allowed 3 points and 164 total yards in another 19–3 victory, this one against the San Francisco 49ers on Thanksgiving night. Sherman had two interceptions off Colin Kaepernick in the game.

In Week 14, against a Philadelphia Eagles offense that would eventually rank third in the league in points and fifth in yards, the Seahawks gave up 139 yards and 14 points. Tharold Simon picked off his first pass of the season and Earl Thomas recovered a fumble. The Seahawks won, 24–14.

In another tilt against the 49ers in Week 15, San Francisco had 245 yards and 7 points in the 17–7 loss.

In a game that would likely decide the NFC West division, the Seahawks traveled to play the Arizona Cardinals. The Seahawks won 35–6, holding Arizona to 216 yards and the 6 points. Sherman had the only turnover of the game, intercepting a pass by Ryan Lindley and returning it 53 yards.

To close out their run, the Seahawks beat the St. Louis Rams 20–6, giving up 245 yards. The game was sealed on an Earl Thomas forced fumble at the goal line.

==== 2014 postseason ====
Seattle surrendered 362 yards in the divisional-round game against the Carolina Panthers, as well as 17 points. Kam Chancellor sealed the game with an interception off Cam Newton that he took 90 yards for a touchdown. He also twice leaped over the center on field-goal tries in attempts to block the kick, although he missed the ball both times and both plays were whistled dead by a penalty. Richard Sherman recorded an interception as well, and Earl Thomas forced a fumble. Seattle won, 31–17.

In an improbable "miracle" comeback against the Green Bay Packers in the NFC Championship game, the Seahawks scored 15 points in the final 2:09 of regulation and winning on a 35-yard touchdown reception by Jermaine Kearse in overtime. The Seahawks defense held eventual 2014 NFL MVP Aaron Rodgers to just 178 yards passing and one touchdown pass with two interceptions (which went to Sherman and Maxwell). The Seahawks offense and special teams turned the ball over five times in the game, but the defense forced overtime, and the 28–22 victory sent the Seahawks to a second straight Super Bowl.

The 2014 Seahawks defense allowed one 300-yard passer in any game, regular season or postseason, heading into the Super Bowl. The sole instance came in the Seahawks' win over the Broncos when Peyton Manning threw for 303 yards. Ten times they held the opposing quarterback to under 200 yards passing, doing it an 11th time against Rodgers in the NFC Championship game.

The Legion of Boom returned to defend their title in Super Bowl XLIX, they recorded two interceptions facing Patriots quarterback Tom Brady, by cornerback Jeremy Lane and linebacker Bobby Wagner. However, as Lane was attempting to return the ball downfield, he was tackled awkwardly while attempting to brace himself for impact with the ground, severely fracturing his wrist and forearm, while simultaneously damaging the ACL in his knee. Unfortunately, backup nickelback Marcus Burley had been listed as inactive, so Lane was replaced by backup outside cornerback Tharold Simon for the remainder of the game. Simon, seemingly overmatched, was outplayed by slot receiver Julian Edelman and repeatedly targeted by Tom Brady, fostering an unlikely Patriots' 4th-quarter comeback. Lane later said he immediately was sent to surgery to fix his injury, and when he woke up he saw the Seahawks with the ball on the one yard line and witnessed the interception that followed. Defensive end Cliff Avril was also injured during the game, he left during the 3rd quarter due to a concussion and did not return. Despite having a torn ligament in his elbow sustained during the NFC Championship Game, Richard Sherman played the entire game, as did Earl Thomas, even though he dislocated his shoulder during the game. In addition, Kam Chancellor suffered a bruised knee during pre-game practice, but also played. Some point to all these injuries as the cause of the 28 points that the Seahawks allowed to the Patriots, which was unusual for a defense that only allowed an average of 15.9 points during the regular season (first in the NFL). The main focus following the game, however, was the coaching staff's decision to throw the ball on the one yard line instead of allowing Marshawn Lynch to run the ball. Lynch led the league (tied with DeMarco Murray) in running touchdowns that season and was fourth in total rushing yardage.

Their defeat in Super Bowl XLIX was the second time all season that the Legion of Boom allowed a 300-yard passer. It was only the second time that they allowed more than two passing touchdowns in one game, and the only time they allowed four passing touchdowns. The Legion of Boom has given up 300 or more passing yards in only six games since their inception with Richard Sherman's first start in 2011; of those six, two are their games against the New England Patriots. The LOB went 2–1 in their meeting with the Patriots with their only loss against them coming in the Super Bowl (wins in 2012 and 2016).

=== 2015 season ===
The Legion of Boom had a rocky start to the 2015 season, both on and off the field. Kam Chancellor did not attend training camp and missed the entire preseason, holding out in an effort to get the team to renegotiate his contract, which had three seasons remaining. The holdout continued into the regular season, with Chancellor not being a part of the team for the first two games. The Seahawks would lose both games, the defense allowing 27 points in both games. Dion Bailey, replacing Chancellor at strong safety in Week 1, fell down in coverage and allowed the game-tying touchdown with less than a minute left in the fourth quarter.

Chancellor would bring the Legion back together in Week 3 by ending his holdout without any contract concessions from the team. In that Week 3 game, the Seahawks surrendered 0 points and 146 total offensive yards.

The next week, the Seahawks defense allowed 3 points and 256 yards against the Lions. With less than two minutes remaining in the game and the Seahawks leading 13–10, Lions Wide Receiver Calvin Johnson caught a pass and was preparing to leap into the endzone for the go-ahead touchdown, but Kam Chancellor punched the ball out at the one-yard line, the forced fumble ultimately preserving the win. The play garnered more attention for what happened after the fumble, with K. J. Wright illegally batting the ball out of the back of the endzone for a touchback, which should have been a penalty that would have kept the ball in the possession of the Lions.

Against the Cincinnati Bengals in Week 5, the LOB recorded an interception from Andy Dalton, the first interception by the Seahawks in the 2015 season. In Week 6 against the Carolina Panthers, both Earl Thomas and Kam Chancellor recorded interceptions. Both games, however, would end in close losses for the Seahawks.

In Week 7, playing the San Francisco 49ers on the road, the Seahawks defense allowed just 142 offensive yards (the 49ers lowest output in a game since 2006) in a 20–3 victory. The following week, the Seahawks held the Dallas Cowboys to 220 total yards and 12 points on four field goals in a 13–12 victory.

Despite allowing a then-team record 456 passing yards to Pittsburgh Steelers' quarterback Ben Roethlisberger (since broken by Matt Schaub's 460 yards passing in 2019), the Legion of Boom recorded 4 interceptions (their most since Super Bowl XLVIII) in a crucial Week 12 game in Seattle (2 off of Roethlisberger, 2 off of backup Landry Jones). In addition, they held star wide receiver Antonio Brown to just 6 catches for 51 yards. The turnovers, especially the two by Sherman, would help lead Seattle to a 39–30 win. In Week 17, to close out another dominant year, the Legion of Boom dismantled the high-powered Arizona Cardinals offense in a 36–6 win. They held Arizona to only 236 yards and recorded 3 interceptions. It was the only time all year that the Cardinals would score fewer than 20 points and gain fewer than 350 yards at home.

Although they were not quite as dominant defensively as they were the last 3 years, 2015 marked the fourth straight season that the Seahawks led the NFL in points allowed, averaging 17.3 points per game. The Legion of Boom also held opponents to the second-fewest passing yards and the fewest passing touchdowns of any defensive secondary in the NFL. According to Football Outsiders' proprietary DVOA metric, Seattle's defense was ranked third against the pass and fourth overall, their lowest rankings in those respective categories since 2011.

=== Coaches ===
Several key Seahawks defensive coaches in the Carroll/Legion of Boom era have gone on to jobs elsewhere in the league. Defensive coordinator Gus Bradley became the head coach of the Jacksonville Jaguars between 2013 and 2016, was the defensive coordinator of the Los Angeles Chargers between 2017 and 2020, was the defensive coordinator of the Las Vegas Raiders in 2021 and then became defensive coordinator for the Indianapolis Colts between 2022 and 2024. His successor Dan Quinn was the head coach of the Atlanta Falcons from 2015 to 2020 and took his team to Super Bowl LI, he then became defensive coordinator for the Dallas Cowboys before getting another head coach promotion this time of the Washington Commanders. Quinn immediately took the Commanders to their first NFC Championship game since 1991 in his first season as head coach in 2024. Kris Richard was fired on January 10, 2018, after five seasons as a defensive back coach and three as defensive coordinator, and was hired by the Dallas Cowboys to fill in as their defensive backs coach and defensive play caller. Richard next became the New Orleans Saints co-defensive coordinator.

Linebackers coach Ken Norton Jr. was hired as the defensive coordinator of the Oakland Raiders and then returned to the Seahawks as their defensive coordinator in 2018 before being fired following the 2021 season. Defensive backs coach Jerry Gray, who coached the unit in 2010, became the defensive coordinator of the Tennessee Titans the following year and is the current assistant head coach of the Atlanta Falcons. Defensive line coach Todd Wash was the defensive coordinator of the Jacksonville Jaguars and helped lead his team to the 2017 AFC Championship Game primarily due to their stout Sacksonville defensive unit. Quality control coach Robert Saleh is the current defensive coordinator of the San Francisco 49ers, he helped lead them to Super Bowl LIV and is the former head coach of the New York Jets. Defensive assistant Marquand Manuel was the defensive coordinator of the Atlanta Falcons until the end of the 2018 season. Assistant special teams coach Jeff Ulbrich became the defensive coordinator for the Atlanta Falcons in the 2020 season and again in the 2025 season and served as the defensive coordinator and eventual interim head coach of the New York Jets. Defensive line coach and assistant head coach Clint Hurtt became defensive coordinator for the Seahawks before being fired after the 2023 season. Hurtt would go on to become the defensive line coach of the Philadelphia Eagles, helping them win Super Bowl LIX. Offensive coaches Dave Canales and Brian Schottenheimer would also go on to become head coaches for the Carolina Panthers and Dallas Cowboys.

Several front office personnel would also go on to become general managers for various teams. These included John Idzik Jr. (New York Jets), Scot McCloughan (Washington Redskins), Scott Fitterer (Carolina Panthers) and Dan Morgan (Carolina Panthers).

=== Accolades (with Seahawks) ===
- Richard Sherman: 4× Pro Bowl (2013–2016), 3× First-team All-Pro (2012–2014), Second-team All-Pro (2015), NFL interceptions leader (2013), 2010s All-Decade Team, Madden NFL 15 cover athlete
- Kam Chancellor: 4× Pro Bowl (2011, 2013–2015), 2× Second-team All-Pro (2013, 2014)
- Earl Thomas: 6× Pro Bowl (2011–2015, 2017), 3× First-team All-Pro (2012–2014), 2× Second-team All-Pro (2011, 2017), 2010s All-Decade Team
- Brandon Browner: Pro Bowl (2011)
- Bobby Wagner: 9× Pro Bowl (2014–2021, 2023), 6× First-team All-Pro (2014, 2016–2020), 3× Second-team All-Pro (2015, 2021, 2023), 3× NFL tackles leader (2016, 2019, 2023), 2010s All-Decade Team
- K. J. Wright: Pro Bowl (2016)
- Malcolm Smith: Super Bowl MVP (XLVIII)
- Michael Bennett: 3× Pro Bowl (2015–2017), Pro Bowl Defensive MVP (2015)
- Cliff Avril: Pro Bowl (2016)
- Pete Carroll: 2010s All-Decade Team

== Statistics ==
Passing Defense
Year	Passing Yards	Rank	Points Allowed	Rank	Passing Touchdowns	Rank	Interceptions	Rank
2011	3,518	11th	315	7th	18	6th	22	4th
2012	3,250	6th	245	1st	15	2nd	18	8th
2013	2,751	1st	231	1st	16	2nd	28	1st
2014	2,970	1st	254	1st	17	2nd	13	18th
2015	3,364	2nd	277	1st	14	1st	14	13th
2016	3,612	8th	292	3rd	16	3rd	11	21st
2017	3,347	6th	332	13th	19	7th	14	14th

- All statistics from Pro Football Reference

== See also ==
- The Dark Side
- Fearsome Foursome
- Sacksonville
- No Fly Zone
- Steel Curtain
- Purple People Eaters
- Monsters of the Midway
- Big Blue Wrecking Crew
- New York Sack Exchange
- Doomsday Defense
- 1985 Chicago Bears
- 2000 Baltimore Ravens
