= Bradley McDougald =

American football player (born 1990)

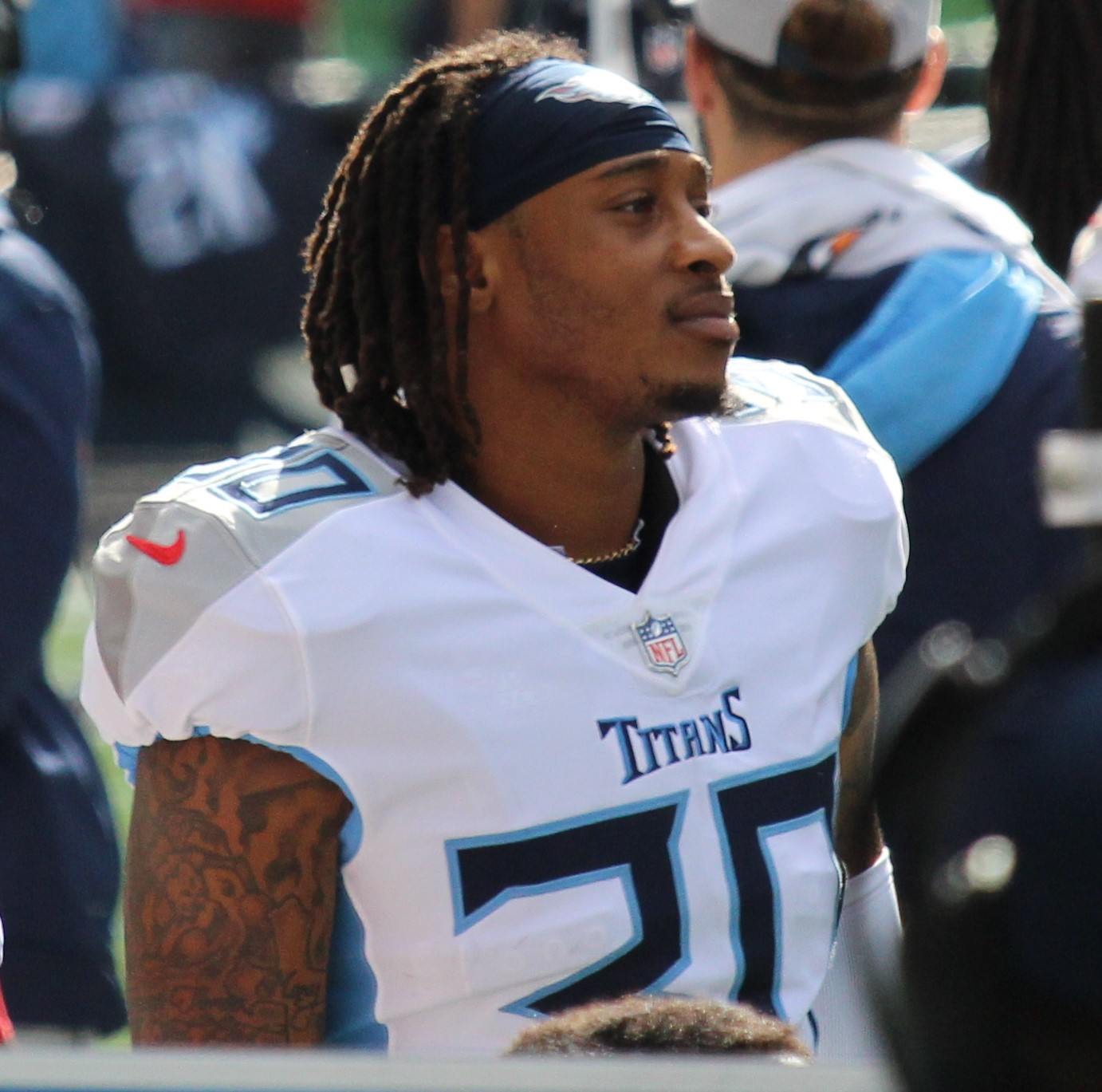
- McDougald with the Tennessee Titans in 2021

No. 48, 49, 30, 22
- Position: Safety

Personal information
- Born: November 15, 1990 (age 35); Dublin, Ohio, U.S.
- Listed height: 6 ft 1 in (1.85 m)
- Listed weight: 215 lb (98 kg)

Career information
- High school: Dublin Scioto
- College: Kansas (2009–2012)
- NFL draft: 2013: undrafted

Career history
- Kansas City Chiefs (2013); Tampa Bay Buccaneers (2013–2016); Seattle Seahawks (2017–2019); New York Jets (2020); Tennessee Titans (2021); Jacksonville Jaguars (2021)

Awards and highlights
- Second-team All-Big 12 (2012)

Career NFL statistics
- Total tackles: 492
- Forced fumbles: 4
- Fumble recoveries: 4
- Pass deflections: 43
- Interceptions: 10
- Stats at Pro Football Reference

Bradley McDougald (born November 15, 1990) is an American former professional football player who was a safety in the National Football League (NFL). He played college football for the Kansas Jayhawks and was signed by the Kansas City Chiefs as undrafted free agent in 2013. He has also played for the Tampa Bay Buccaneers, Seattle Seahawks, New York Jets, Tennessee Titans and Jacksonville Jaguars.

== College career ==
McDougald originally committed to Ohio State University out of Dublin Scioto High School as a wide receiver, but changed his commitment to the University of Kansas. Following his sophomore year, McDougald switched permanently to safety.

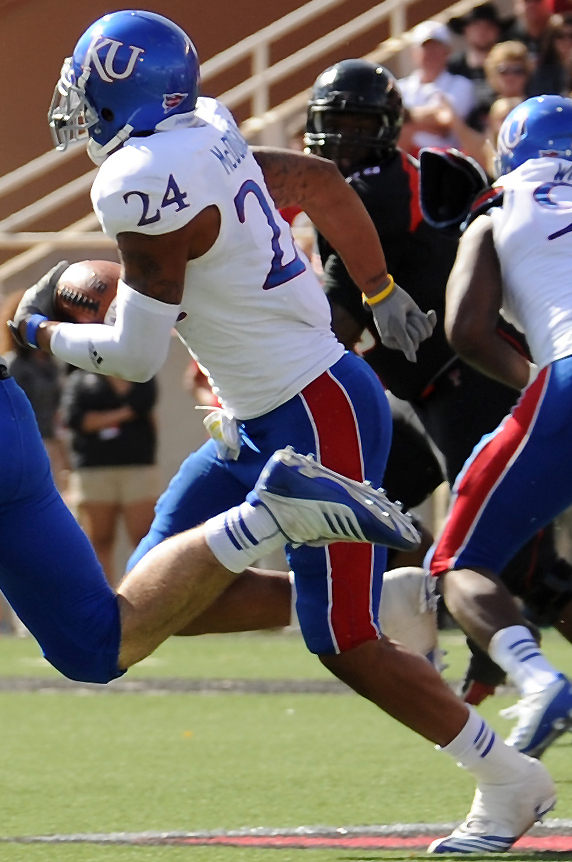
McDougald with Kansas in 2012

== Professional career ==
McDougald attended the NFL Scouting Combine and completed all of the combine and positional drills. His overall combine performance was underwhelming and described as rough. On March 15, 2013, McDougald participated at Illinois' pro day and attempted to improve his 40-yard dash (4.51s), 20-yard dash (2.62s), 10-yard dash (1.63s), vertical jump (33"), and short shuttle (4.33s). At the conclusion of the pre-draft process, McDougald was projected to be a seventh round pick or priority undrafted free agent. He was ranked as the 12th best free safety in the draft by DraftScout.com.

Pre-draft measurables
Height	Weight	Arm length	Hand span	40-yard dash	10-yard split	20-yard split	20-yard shuttle	Three-cone drill	Vertical jump	Broad jump	Bench press
6 ft 0 1/4 in (1.84 m)	215 lb (98 kg)	32 1/2 in (0.83 m)	9 1/8 in (0.23 m)	4.51 s	1.63 s	2.62 s	4.33 s	7.07 s	34.5 in (0.88 m)	10 ft 2 in (3.10 m)	19 reps
All values from NFL Combine/Pro Day

=== Kansas City Chiefs ===
==== 2013: Rookie year ====
On April 29, 2013, the Kansas City Chiefs signed McDougald to a three-year, $1.48 million contract after he went undrafted in the 2013 NFL draft.

Throughout training camp, McDougald competed for a roster spot as a backup safety against Quintin Demps, Husain Abdullah, Otha Foster, Tysyn Hartman, Greg Castillo, and Malcolm Bronson. McDougald had an impressive performance throughout the preseason and made 13 combined tackles (11 solo) and a pass deflection. On September 1, 2013, McDougald was released by the Kansas City Chiefs, but was re-signed two days later. Head coach Andy Reid named McDougald the fifth safety on the Chiefs' depth chart, behind Eric Berry, Kendrick Lewis, Husain Abdullah, and Quintin Demps.

On September 16, 2013, the Kansas City Chiefs waived McDougald and re-signed him to the practice squad two days later. On October 12, 2013, he was promoted to the Chiefs' active roster. The following day, McDougald made his professional regular season debut in the Chiefs' Week 3 victory against the Oakland Raiders. On November 5, 2013, McDougald was waived by the Chiefs. McDougald was inactive as a healthy scratch for five games and only appeared in one game during his stint with the Kansas City Chiefs.

=== Tampa Bay Buccaneers ===
On November 7, 2013, the Tampa Bay Buccaneers claimed McDougald off of waivers. The Buccaneers claimed him after starting free safety Dashon Goldson sustained a knee injury and was inactive for two games (Weeks 8–9). Head coach Greg Schiano named McDougald the backup free safety behind Kelcie McCray upon joining the Buccaneers. McDougald appeared in three games with the Buccaneers and appeared primarily on special teams. He was inactive as a healthy scratch for five of the seven regular season games. On December 30, 2013, the Tampa Bay Buccaneers fired head coach Greg Schiano and general manager Mark Dominik after they finished with a 4–12 record in 2013.

==== 2014 ====
During training camp, McDougald competed for a roster spot as a backup safety against Kelcie McCray and Keith Tandy. Head coach Lovie Smith named McDougald the backup strong safety to start the regular season, behind Mark Barron.

On September 18, 2014, McDougald made one solo tackle during a 56–14 loss at the Atlanta Falcons in Week 3. McDougald made his first career regular season tackle on running back Devonta Freeman after a three-yard gain in the fourth quarter. On October 28, 2014, the Tampa Bay Buccaneers traded starting strong safety Mark Barron to the St. Louis Rams for a fourth and a sixth round pick in the 2015 NFL draft. McDougald remained the backup strong safety behind Major Wright after the Buccaneers traded Mark Barron. On November 30, 2014, McDougald earned his first career start after Major Wright injured his ribs and was inactive. He made four solo tackles during the Buccaneers' 14–13 loss to the Cincinnati Bengals in Week 13. In Week 15, he collected a season-high 15 combined tackles (11 solo) during a 19–17 loss at the Carolina Panthers. On December 28, 2014, McDougald recorded four combined tackles, a season-high three pass deflections, and made his first career interception in a 23–20 loss to the New Orleans Saints in Week 17. McDougald intercepted a pass by Saints' quarterback Drew Brees. He finished the 2014 season with 50 combined tackles (40 solo), seven pass deflections, and an interception in 15 games and five starts.

==== 2015 ====
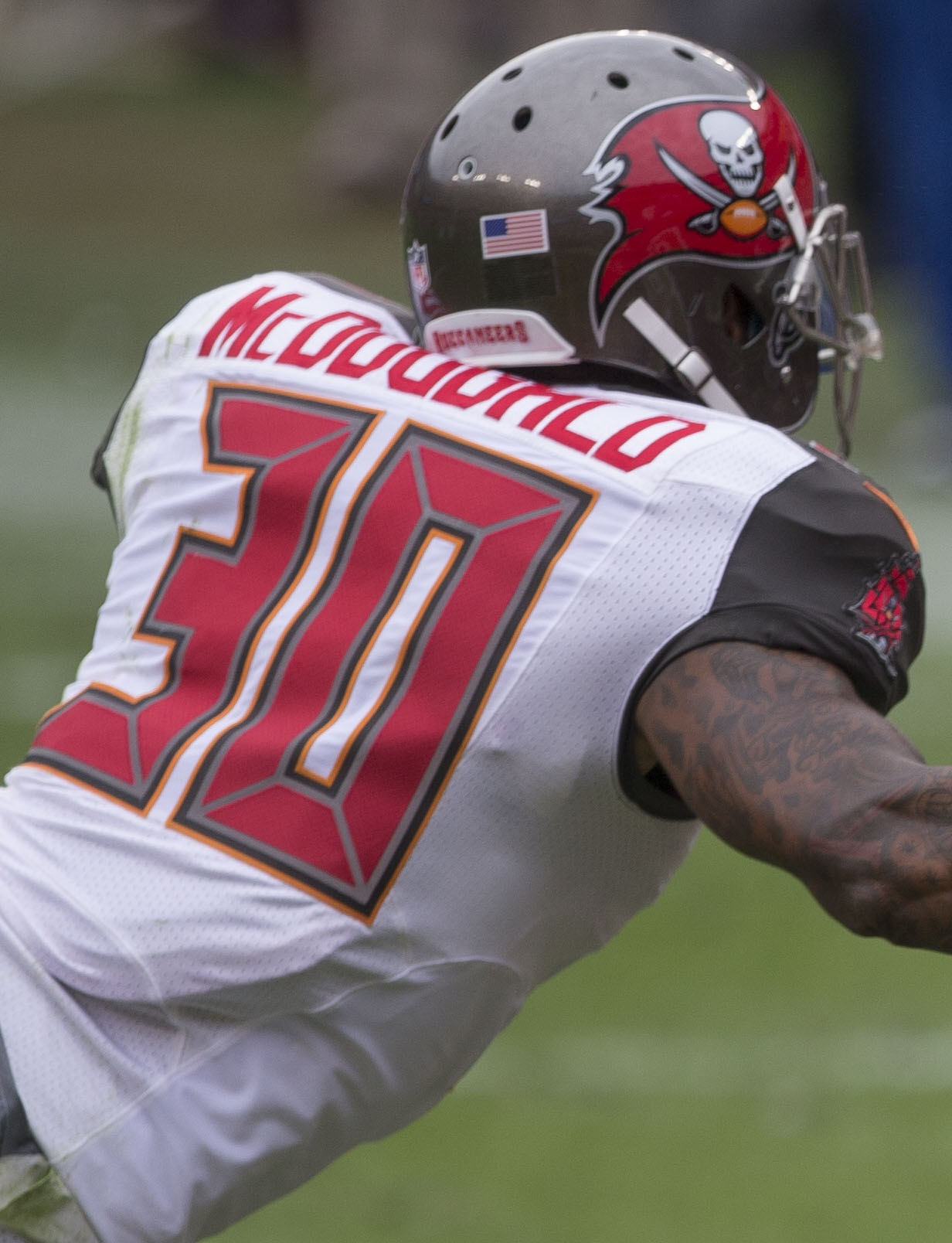
McDougald with the Buccaneers in 2015

On March 5, 2015, the Buccaneers extended a restricted free agent tender offers to McDougald. The Buccaneers signed McDougald to a one-year, $585,000 contract.

During training camp, McDougald competed to be the starting free safety against Chris Conte. Head coach Lovie Smith named McDougald the starting free safety to begin the 2015 regular season, alongside strong safety Major Wright.

On October 11, 2015, McDougald recorded three combined tackles, deflected a pass, and made an interception during a 38–31 victory against the Jacksonville Jaguars. McDougald intercepted a pass by Jaguars' quarterback Blake Bortles, that was originally intended for tight end Marcedes Lewis, during the second quarter. In Week 16, he collected a season-high 12 combined tackles (ten solo) in the Buccaneers' 26–21 loss to the Chicago Bears. He finished the 2015 season with 87 combined tackles (67 solo), four pass deflections, and two interceptions in 16 games and 15 starts.

==== 2016 ====
On January 6, 2016, the Tampa Bay Buccaneers fired head coach Lovie Smith after they finished with a 6–10 record in 2015. On March 9, 2016, the Tampa Bay Buccaneers assigned a second round tender to McDougald as a restricted free agent. On April 5, 2016, McDougald accepted his one-year, $2.55 million restricted free agent tender.

The Buccaneers promoted offensive coordinator Dirk Koetter to head coach and hired former Atlanta Falcons' head coach Mike Smith as their defensive coordinator. McDougald entered training camp slated as the starting free safety. Head coach Dirk Koetter officially named McDougald the starting free safety to start the season, alongside strong safety Chris Conte.

In Week 4, he collected a season-high eight solo tackles during a 27–7 loss to the Denver Broncos. On October 23, 2016, McDougald recorded seven combined tackles, deflected a pass, and made an interception in the Buccaneers' 34–17 victory at the San Francisco 49ers. The following week, he tied his season-high of eight solo tackles and broke up a pass during a 30–24 loss to the Oakland Raiders in Week 8. He started in all 16 games in 2016 and made a career-high 91 combined tackles (79 solo), ten pass deflections, and two interceptions. Defensive coordinator Mike Smith installed a multiple coverage defense that required McDougald to play both strong safety and free safety. Pro Football Focus gave McDougald an overall grade of 79.0 in 2016.

=== Seattle Seahawks ===
==== 2017 ====
On March 22, 2017, the Seattle Seahawks signed McDougald to a one-year, $2 million contract with $750,000 guaranteed.

Head coach Pete Carroll named McDougald the backup free safety, behind Earl Thomas, to start the regular season. In Week 9, McDougald started at free safety in place of Earl Thomas after Thomas sustained a hamstring injury that sidelined him for two games. He became the starting strong safety for the remainder of the season in Week 11 after Kam Chancellor sustained a neck injury and was subsequently placed on injured reserve. On December 3, 2017, McDougald collected a season-high 12 combined tackles (seven solo) and two pass deflections during a 24–10 victory against the Philadelphia Eagles in Week 13. He finished the season with 75 combined tackles (51 solo) and four pass deflections in 16 games and nine starts. Pro Football Focus gave McDougald an overall grade of 77.3, which ranked 47th among all safeties in 2017.

==== 2018 ====
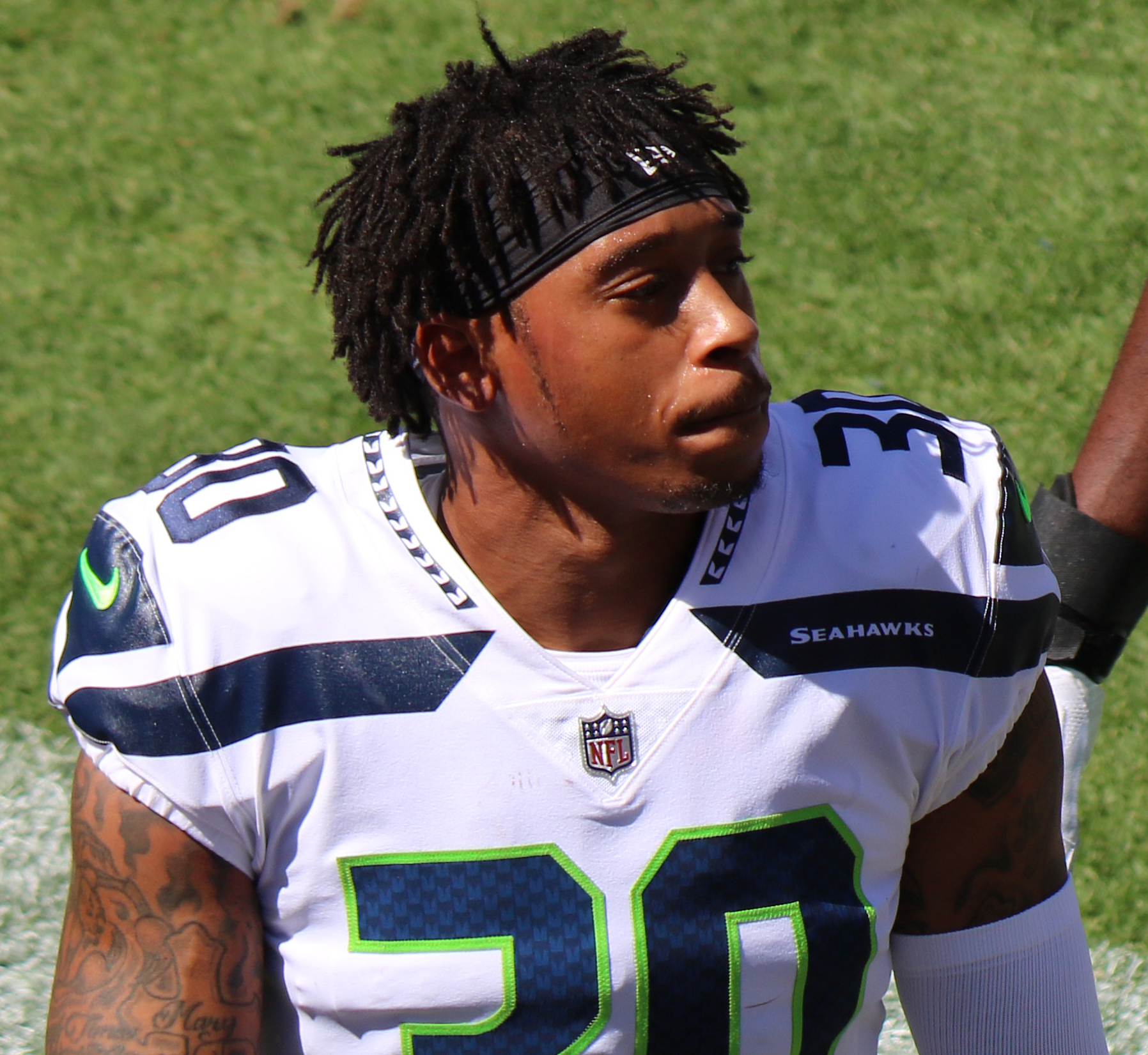
McDougald with the Seahawks in 2018

On March 12, 2018, the Seahawks re-signed McDougald to a three-year, $13.95 million contract with $6.50 million guaranteed and a signing bonus of $4 million. In the Seahawks' 27–24 loss to the Denver Broncos in the season opener, he recorded his first career game with two interceptions. He received an overall grade of 74.7 from Pro a Football Focus, which ranked 22nd among all qualified safeties in 2018.

==== 2019 ====
In week 2 against the Pittsburgh Steelers, McDougald recorded his first interception of the season off Mason Rudolph as the Seahawks won 28–26. In the NFC Wild Card game against the Philadelphia Eagles, McDougald recorded a team high 11 tackles and sacked Carson Wentz once during the 17–9 win.

=== New York Jets ===
On July 25, 2020, McDougald, along with first- and third-round picks in the 2021 NFL draft and a first-round selection in the 2022 NFL draft, was traded to the New York Jets in exchange for safety Jamal Adams and a fourth-round selection in the 2022 NFL Draft.

McDougald made his debut with the Jets in Week 1 against the Buffalo Bills. During the game, McDougald recorded 8 tackles and recovered a fumble in the 27–17 loss. He suffered a shoulder injury in Week 7 and was placed on injured reserve on October 31, 2020.

=== Tennessee Titans ===
On August 16, 2021, McDougald signed with the Tennessee Titans. He was released on September 7, and re-signed to the practice squad. He was promoted to the active roster on September 13, 2021. He was released on September 21, 2021.

=== Jacksonville Jaguars ===
On December 31, 2021, McDougald was signed to the Jacksonville Jaguars practice squad. He was promoted to the active roster on January 1, 2022 and returned to the practice squad on January 3, 2022.

== NFL career statistics ==
Legend
**Bold**	Career high

=== Regular season ===
Year	Team	Games		Tackles					Interceptions					Fumbles			
Year	Team	GP	GS	Cmb	Solo	Ast	Sck	TFL	Int	Yds	TD	Lng	PD	FF	FR	Yds	TD
2013	KAN	1	0	0	0	0	0.0	0	0	0	0	0	0	0	0	0	0
2013	TAM	3	0	0	0	0	0.0	0	0	0	0	0	0	0	0	0	0
2014	TAM	15	5	50	40	10	0.0	0	1	0	0	0	7	0	0	0	0
2015	TAM	**16**	15	87	67	20	0.0	2	2	1	0	1	4	0	0	0	0
2016	TAM	**16**	**16**	**91**	**79**	12	0.0	3	2	32	0	32	**10**	0	**1**	**6**	0
2017	SEA	**16**	9	75	51	**24**	0.0	3	0	0	0	0	4	0	0	0	0
2018	SEA	**16**	**16**	78	66	12	0.0	**4**	**3**	**39**	0	**39**	9	**3**	**1**	0	0
2019	SEA	15	14	70	52	18	**0.5**	1	2	0	0	0	6	1	**1**	0	0
2020	NYJ	7	7	36	23	13	0.0	0	0	0	0	0	3	0	**1**	-2	0
2021	TEN	2	1	3	3	0	0.0	0	0	0	0	0	0	0	0	0	0
2021	JAX	1	0	2	0	2	0.0	0	0	0	0	0	0	0	0	0	0
Career		108	83	492	381	111	0.5	13	10	72	0	39	43	4	4	4	0

=== Playoffs ===
Year	Team	Games		Tackles					Interceptions					Fumbles			
Year	Team	GP	GS	Cmb	Solo	Ast	Sck	TFL	Int	Yds	TD	Lng	PD	FF	FR	Yds	TD
2018	SEA	1	1	10	9	1	0.0	0	0	0	0	0	0	0	0	0	0
2019	SEA	**2**	**2**	**15**	**12**	**3**	**1.0**	**3**	0	0	0	0	**1**	0	0	0	0
Career		3	3	25	21	4	1.0	3	0	0	0	0	1	0	0	0	0
