= Marcus Burley =

American football player (born 1990)

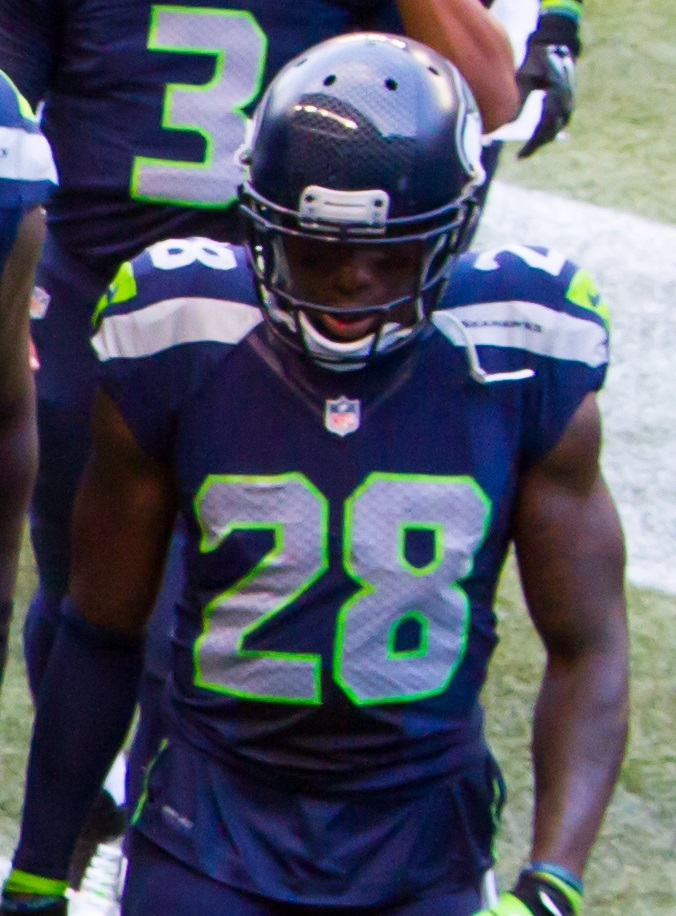
- Burley with the Seattle Seahawks in 2014

No. 20, 26, 28
- Position: Cornerback

Personal information
- Born: July 16, 1990 (age 36); Richmond, Virginia, U.S.
- Listed height: 5 ft 10 in (1.78 m)
- Listed weight: 190 lb (86 kg)

Career information
- High school: Highland Springs (Highland Springs, Virginia)
- College: Delaware
- NFL draft: 2013: undrafted

Career history
- Jacksonville Jaguars (2013); Philadelphia Eagles (2013)*; St. Louis Rams (2013)*; Indianapolis Colts (2013–2014)*; Seattle Seahawks (2014–2015); Cleveland Browns (2016); Houston Texans (2017)
- * Offseason or practice squad member only

Career NFL statistics
- Total tackles: 62
- Sacks: 2
- Pass deflections: 8
- Interceptions: 2
- Stats at Pro Football Reference

Marcus Burley (born July 16, 1990) is an American former professional football player who was a cornerback in the National Football League (NFL). He was signed by the Jacksonville Jaguars as an undrafted free agent after the 2013 NFL draft. He played college football for the Delaware Fightin' Blue Hens.

== Early life ==
Burley attended Highland Springs High School in Highland Springs, Virginia.

== Professional career ==
=== Jacksonville Jaguars ===
After going undrafted, Burley was signed to the Jacksonville Jaguars' active roster on September 14, 2013, after spending the first week of the season on the practice squad. He was released on September 16, 2013, and re-signed to the practice squad the next day. He was released from the practice squad on October 1, 2013.

=== Philadelphia Eagles ===
He was signed to the Philadelphia Eagles practice squad on October 9, 2013. He was later released.

=== Indianapolis Colts ===
He was signed by the Rams for the final two weeks of the regular season and then by the Colts shortly thereafter.

=== Seattle Seahawks ===
Burley was traded to the Seahawks on August 30, 2014, for a 6th-round pick in the 2015 NFL draft. With the trade Burley became a member of the Legion of Boom defensive.

In 2014 vs the Carolina Panthers, Burley recorded his first interception against Cam Newton. He finished the season with 35 tackles, one sack, five passes defensed and one interception.

In 2015 vs the Browns, Burley recorded both a sack and an interception on Johnny Manziel. He finished his second season with the Seahawks with 18 tackles, one sack, two passes defensed and one interception.

On September 3, 2016, he was released by the Seahawks.

=== Cleveland Browns ===
On September 4, 2016, Burley was claimed off waivers by the Browns.

On September 3, 2017, Burley was released by the Browns.

=== Houston Texans ===
On September 6, 2017, Burley was signed by the Houston Texans. He was waived on October 25, 2017.
