= Byron Maxwell =

American football player (born 1988)

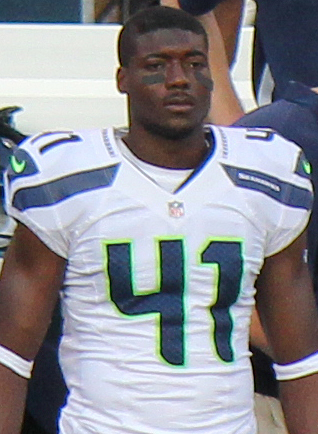
- Maxwell with the Seattle Seahawks in 2012

No. 41, 31
- Position: Cornerback

Personal information
- Born: February 23, 1988 (age 38); North Charleston, South Carolina, U.S.
- Listed height: 6 ft 1 in (1.85 m)
- Listed weight: 198 lb (90 kg)

Career information
- High school: Fort Dorchester (North Charleston)
- College: Clemson (2006–2010)
- NFL draft: 2011: 6th round, 173rd overall pick

Career history
- Seattle Seahawks (2011–2014); Philadelphia Eagles (2015); Miami Dolphins (2016–2017); Seattle Seahawks (2017)

Awards and highlights
- Super Bowl champion (XLVIII)

Career NFL statistics
- Total tackles: 245
- Forced fumbles: 11
- Fumble recoveries: 5
- Pass deflections: 58
- Interceptions: 11
- Stats at Pro Football Reference

Byron S. Maxwell (born February 23, 1988) is an American former professional football player who was a cornerback in the National Football League (NFL). He was selected by the Seattle Seahawks in the sixth round of the 2011 NFL draft, where he was a member of the Seahawks' defensive group known as the Legion of Boom. Maxwell also played for the Philadelphia Eagles and Miami Dolphins. He played college football for the Clemson Tigers.

== Early life ==
Maxwell attended Fort Dorchester High School in North Charleston, South Carolina, where he played football and ran track. As a junior cornerback, Maxwell had 60 total tackles, 19 pass breakups, led his team with 5 interceptions, returned for a total of 64 yards and 1 touchdown, and had 1 forced fumble. He also saw some time at kick return and punt return. In track & field, Maxwell was timed at 4.5 seconds in the 40-yard dash and 10.8 in the 100-meter dash. He also bench-pressed 275 pounds and squatted 350.

Despite suffering an ACL tear and missing his entire senior season, Maxwell had many offers to places like Georgia, Maryland, Clemson, Nebraska, Notre Dame, South Carolina, and Virginia Tech. Maxwell committed to Clemson University on June 8, 2005, and signed his letter of intent on February 1, 2006, where he majored in sociology.

== College career ==
Due to Maxwell's ACL tear during his senior year of high school, he redshirted his freshman year at Clemson. As a sophomore, he had 27 total tackles along with four pass breakups. He played as a reserve in the Gator Bowl against Nebraska with six tackles in 28 snaps including four special teams tackles. He earned the title special teams player of the week in games against N.C. State, Wake Forest, and Duke, and defensive player of the week at Virginia. He led the team in special teams tackles with 21 tackles. As a junior, Maxwell had 15 tackles on special teams plays, which again led the team. He played in 13 games with eight starts, recording 48 tackles, 3.5 tackles for loss, two interceptions, seven pass breakups, and tied for the team-high with three forced fumbles as a senior.

Maxwell played in four bowl games and had 16 combined tackles in those games. He earned team defensive player of the game against #16 Miami (Fla.) after totaling eight tackles and three pass breakups. Maxwell registered 165 tackles, 11.5 tackles for loss, a sack, four interceptions, 20 pass breakups, and six caused fumbles in a school record-tying 53 games (eight starts) in his career. He had 45 career special teams tackles, six careers forced fumbles, among the top-10 figures in Clemson history. Maxwell ultimately ended up attaining an ACC second place tie within the forced fumbles category during his tenure with the Tigers. He was noted as being one of the hardest hitting defensive backs in the ACC.

== Professional career ==
External videos
- Byron Maxwell's NFL Combine Workout

Pre-draft measurables
Height	Weight	Arm length	Hand span	Wingspan	40-yard dash	10-yard split	20-yard split	20-yard shuttle	Three-cone drill	Vertical jump	Broad jump	Bench press
6 ft 0 1/4 in (1.84 m)	202 lb (92 kg)	33 1/2 in (0.85 m)	9 1/2 in (0.24 m)	6 ft 5 1/2 in (1.97 m)	4.52 s	1.58 s	2.61 s	4.49 s	7.12 s	33 in (0.84 m)	10 ft 4 in (3.15 m)	24 reps
All values from NFL Combine/Clemson's Pro Day

=== Seattle Seahawks (first stint) ===
==== 2011 ====
The Seattle Seahawks selected Maxwell in the sixth round (173rd overall) of the 2011 NFL draft. Maxwell was the 26th cornerback drafted and was the second cornerback selected by Seahawks in 2011.

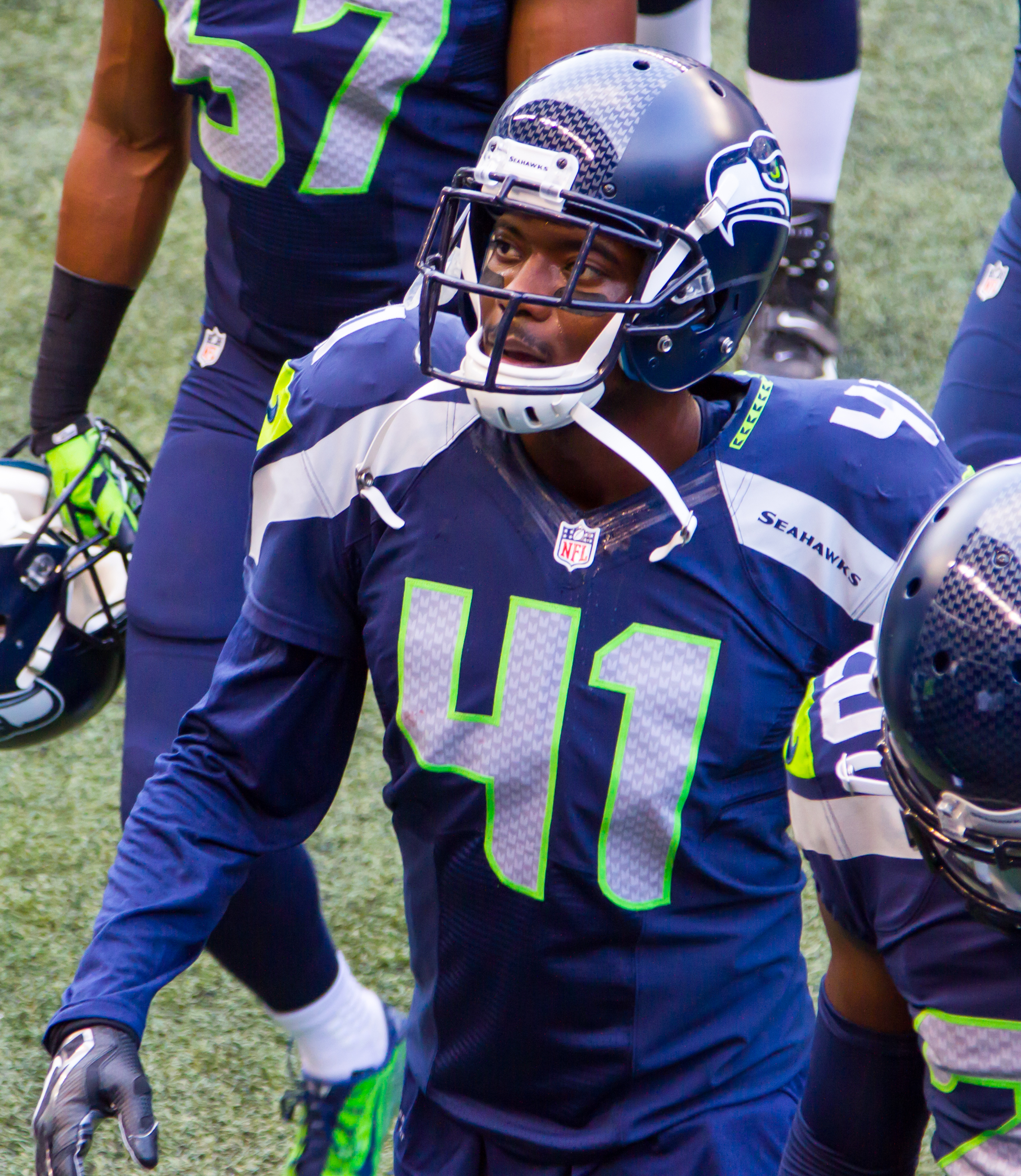
Maxwell in 2014 preseason

On July 29, 2011, the Seahawks signed Maxwell to a four-year, $2.15 million contract that included a signing bonus of $113,452.

Throughout training camp, Maxwell competed to be a starting cornerback against Walter Thurmond, Richard Sherman, Kelly Jennings, Brandon Browner, and Kennard Cox. Head coach Pete Carroll named Maxwell the fifth cornerback on the depth chart to begin the regular season, behind Marcus Trufant, Brandon Browner, Walter Thurmond, and Richard Sherman.

He made his professional regular season debut in the Seattle Seahawks' season-opening 33–17 loss at the San Francisco 49ers. Maxwell was inactive as a healthy scratch for five consecutive games (Week 2–7). On December 24, 2011, Maxwell recorded his first career tackle on wide receiver Kyle Williams, with teammate Michael Robinson during a 33-yard kick return in the third quarter of the Seahawks' 19–17 loss to the San Francisco 49ers. Maxwell finished his rookie season in 2011 with one tackle in nine games and zero starts. He was relegated to special teams throughout his rookie season.

==== 2012 ====
During training camp in 2012, Maxwell competed for a roster spot as a backup cornerback against Ron Parker, Jeremy Lane, Phillip Adams, Roy Lewis, and Coye Francies. Head coach Pete Carroll named Maxwell the fifth cornerback on the depth chart to start the season, behind Richard Sherman, Brandon Browner, Marcus Trufant, and Jeremy Lane.

Maxwell was inactive as a healthy scratch for six of the first nine regular season games in 2012. Maxwell earned minimal playing time on six of the last seven regular season games due to injuries to Marcus Trufant and Walter Thurmond. On December 9, 2012, he collected a season-high three solo tackles, deflected a pass, and forced a fumble during a 58–0 victory against the Arizona Cardinals in Week 14. He finished the 2012 season with 14 combined tackles (ten solo), four pass deflections, one forced fumble, and one fumble recovery in nine games and zero starts. The Seattle Seahawks finished second in the NFC West with an 11–5 record and earned a wildcard berth. On January 6, 2013, Maxwell appeared in his first career playoff game as the Seahawks defeated the Washington Redskins 24–14. They were eliminated from the playoffs the following week after losing 30–28 at the Atlanta Falcons in the NFC Divisional Round.

==== 2013 ====
Throughout training camp, Maxwell competed for a roster spot as a backup cornerback against Will Blackmon, DeShawn Shead, Tharold Simon, Ron Parker, Antoine Winfield, Walter Thurmond, and Jeremy Lane. Head coach Pete Carroll named Maxwell the third cornerback on the depth chart to start the 2013 season, behind Richard Sherman and Brandon Browner.

Maxwell earned his first career start in Week 13 after Brandon Browner was suspended and Walter Thurmond sustained an injury. He finished the Seattle Seahawks' victory against the New Orleans Saints with two combined tackles and two pass deflections. On December 8, 2013, Maxwell collected a season-high five solo tackles, three pass deflections, and made his first career interception during a 19–17 loss at the San Francisco 49ers. Maxwell intercepted a pass by 49ers' quarterback Colin Kaepernick, that was originally intended for wide receiver Michael Crabtree, and was tackled after a two-yard return in the third quarter. The following week, Maxwell recorded a solo tackle, broke up two passes, and made two interceptions off pass attempts by quarterback Eli Manning as the Seahawks defeated the New York Giants in Week 14. He finished the 2013 season with 28 combined tackles (23 solo), 12 pass deflections, and four interceptions in 16 games and five starts.

The Seattle Seahawks finished first in the NFC West with a 13–3 record and earned a first round bye. On January 11, 2014, Maxwell made his first postseason start and recorded five combined tackles during a 23–15 win against the New Orleans Saints in the NFC Divisional Round. The Seahawks advanced to the Super Bowl after defeating the San Francisco 49ers 23–17 in the NFC Championship Game. On February 2, 2014, Maxwell started in Super Bowl XLVIII and made four solo tackles and forced a fumble in the third quarter of the Seahawks' 43–8 victory against the Denver Broncos. Maxwell was a key member of the Seahawks' "Legion of Boom" secondary during the end of the season and their playoff run to their first Super Bowl victory in franchise history.

==== 2014 ====
Maxwell entered training camp slated as a starting cornerback after Brandon Browner departed for the New England Patriots during free agency. Head coach Pete Carroll officially named Maxwell and Richard Sherman the starting cornerbacks to start the season.

He started in the Seattle Seahawks' season-opener against the Green Bay Packers and made five combined tackles, two pass deflections, and an interception in their 36–16 victory. In Week 3, he collected a season-high 11 combined tackles (nine solo) and broke up a pass during a 26–20 victory against the Denver Broncos. He was inactive for three games (Weeks 7–9) after injuring his calf in Week 6. Maxwell was limited to 13 games and 12 starts in his first season as a designated starter and made 39 combined tackles (35 solo), 12 pass deflections, two interceptions, and a forced fumble.

The Seattle Seahawks finished atop the NFC West with a 12–4 record and earned a first round bye and home-field advantage throughout the playoffs. They defeated the Carolina Panthers 31–17 in the NFC Divisional Round. On January 18, 2015, Maxwell recorded six combined tackles, deflected a pass, and intercepted a pass by Aaron Rodgers in the Seahawks' 28–22 overtime victory against the Green Bay Packers in the NFC Championship Game. On February 1, 2015, Maxwell started in Super Bowl XLIX and recorded five combined tackles during the Seahawks 28–24 loss to the New England Patriots.

=== Philadelphia Eagles ===
On March 10, 2015, the Philadelphia Eagles signed Maxwell to a six-year, $63 million contract with $25 million guaranteed.

Head coach Chip Kelly named Maxwell the No. 1 cornerback on the depth chart to start the regular season, alongside Nolan Carroll.

He started the Philadelphia Eagles' season-opener at the Atlanta Falcons and collected a season-high ten combined tackles and a pass deflection in their 26–24 loss. Maxwell was tasked with covering wide receiver Julio Jones in his Eagles' debut and allowed ten receptions for 179 yards and two touchdowns on 11 targets. His two touchdown receptions allowed were the only two he allowed throughout the season. In Week 7, he made five combined tackles, two pass deflections, and made his first interception as a member of the Philadelphia Eagles during a 27–16 loss at the Carolina Panthers. He missed the last two games (Weeks 16–17) of the regular season after sustaining a shoulder injury in Week 15 during a loss to the Arizona Cardinals. Maxwell finished the season with 64 combined tackles (53 solo), ten pass deflections, two forced fumbles, and two interceptions in 14 games and 14 starts.

Maxwell is widely regarded as one of the biggest free agent busts in Eagles history.

=== Miami Dolphins ===
==== 2016 ====
On March 9, 2016, the Philadelphia Eagles traded Maxwell, linebacker Kiko Alonso, and a first round draft pick (13th overall) to the Miami Dolphins in exchange for the Dolphins' first round draft pick (eighth overall) of the 2016 NFL draft. The Miami Dolphins used the first round pick (13th overall) they received to draft offensive tackle Laremy Tunsil and the Eagles used their first round pick to trade up and draft quarterback Carson Wentz with the second overall pick.

Head coach Adam Gase named Maxwell and Xavien Howard the starting cornerbacks to start the 2016 regular season. In Week 3, he collected a season-high seven combined tackles and made three pass deflections during a 30–24 win against the Cleveland Browns. He was benched for the Dolphins' Week 4 loss to the Cincinnati Bengals and was inactive as a healthy scratch with Tony Lippett starting in his place. Maxwell returned as a starter in Week 6 after Xavien Howard was placed on injured reserve due to a torn meniscus. In Week 10, Maxwell had five solo tackles, two pass deflections, and made his first interception as a member of the Dolphins during a 31–24 victory at the San Diego Chargers. On December 17, 2016, Maxwell injured his ankle during the first half of a Week 15 victory at the New York Jets and was inactive for the last two games (Weeks 16–17) of the regular season. Maxwell finished the 2016 season with 53 combined tackles (43 solo), a career-high 15 passes defensed, four forced fumbles, and two interceptions in 13 games and 13 starts.

==== 2017 ====
Head coach Adam Gase retained Maxwell and Xavien Howard as the starting cornerbacks to begin the regular season in 2017.

Maxwell injured his foot and was sidelined for four games (Weeks 4–7). On October 24, 2017, the Miami Dolphins released Maxwell.

=== Seattle Seahawks (second stint) ===
On November 13, 2017, the Seahawks signed Maxwell to a one-year contract. Maxwell was signed as a replacement for Richard Sherman who was placed on injured reserve after rupturing his Achilles. Maxwell surpassed Jeremy Lane on the depth chart in Week 13 and recorded seven combined tackles, two pass deflections, and an interception during a 24–10 victory against the Philadelphia Eagles. He started alongside rookie Shaquill Griffin for the last six games of the regular season. The following week, Maxwell collected a career-high nine solo tackles and broke up a pass in the Seahawks' 30–24 loss at the Jacksonville Jaguars in Week 14. He finished the 2017 season with 46 combined tackles (39 solo), seven pass deflections, two forced fumbles, and an interception in nine games and eight starts.

On April 27, 2018, the Seahawks signed Maxwell to a one-year, $2 million contract with a $200,000 signing bonus. On September 1, 2018, Maxwell was placed on injured reserve. He was released with an injury settlement six days later.

== NFL career statistics ==
Legend
**Bold**	Career high

=== Regular season ===
Year	Team	Games		Tackles					Interceptions					Fumbles			
Year	Team	GP	GS	Cmb	Solo	Ast	Sck	TFL	Int	Yds	TD	Lng	PD	FF	FR	Yds	TD
2011	SEA	9	0	1	0	1	0.0	0	0	0	0	0	0	0	**1**	1	0
2012	SEA	9	0	14	10	4	0.0	0	0	0	0	0	2	1	**1**	**11**	0
2013	SEA	**16**	5	28	23	5	0.0	**1**	**4**	6	0	6	12	2	**1**	0	0
2014	SEA	13	12	39	35	4	0.0	0	2	23	0	21	12	0	**1**	0	0
2015	PHI	14	**14**	**64**	**53**	**11**	0.0	0	2	22	0	22	10	2	**1**	2	0
2016	MIA	13	13	53	43	10	0.0	**1**	2	**29**	0	**27**	**15**	**4**	0	0	0
2017	MIA	2	2	8	8	0	0.0	0	0	0	0	0	0	1	0	0	0
2017	SEA	7	6	38	31	7	0.0	0	1	0	0	0	7	1	0	0	0
Total		83	52	245	203	42	0.0	2	11	80	0	27	58	11	5	14	0

=== Playoffs ===
Year	Team	Games		Tackles					Interceptions					Fumbles			
Year	Team	GP	GS	Cmb	Solo	Ast	Sck	TFL	Int	Yds	TD	Lng	PD	FF	FR	Yds	TD
2012	SEA	1	0	0	0	0	0.0	0	0	0	0	0	0	0	0	0	0
2013	SEA	**3**	**3**	**12**	8	**4**	0.0	0	0	0	0	0	**2**	**1**	0	0	0
2014	SEA	**3**	2	11	**10**	1	0.0	0	**1**	**5**	0	**5**	1	0	0	0	0
Total		7	5	23	18	5	0.0	0	1	5	0	5	3	1	0	0	0
