= Kelcie McCray =

American football player (born 1988)

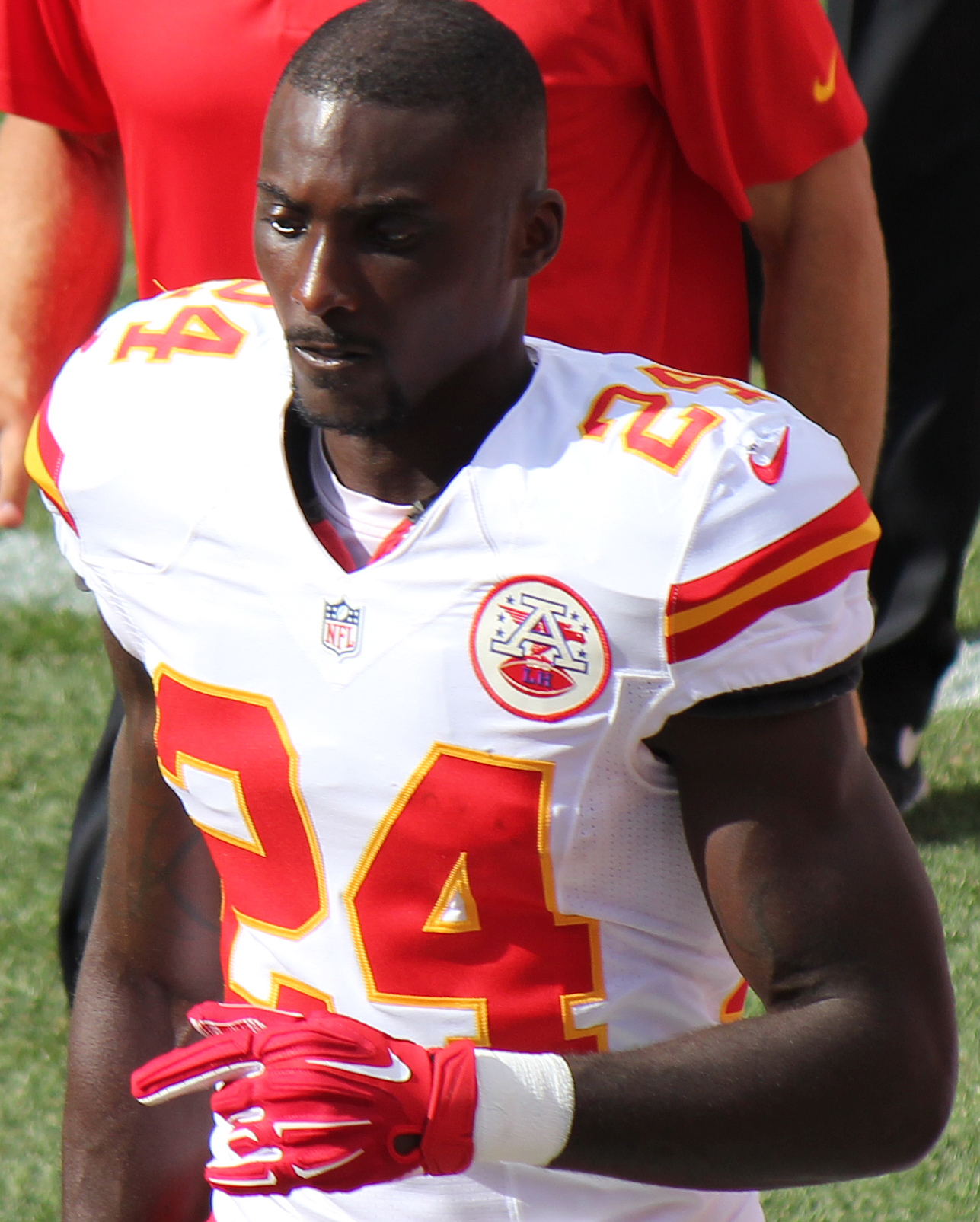
- McCray with the Kansas City Chiefs in 2014

No. 37, 35, 24, 33
- Position: Safety

Personal information
- Born: September 21, 1988 (age 38); Columbus, Georgia, U.S.
- Listed height: 6 ft 2 in (1.88 m)
- Listed weight: 202 lb (92 kg)

Career information
- High school: Hardaway (Columbus)
- College: Arkansas State
- NFL draft: 2012: undrafted

Career history
- Miami Dolphins (2012–2013); Tampa Bay Buccaneers (2013); Kansas City Chiefs (2014); Seattle Seahawks (2015–2016); Buffalo Bills (2018)*
- * Offseason or practice squad member only

Awards and highlights
- All-Pro (2014); First-team All-Sun Belt (2011)

Career NFL statistics
- Total tackles: 99
- Fumble recoveries: 1
- Pass deflections: 4
- Stats at Pro Football Reference

Kelcie Jerome McCray (born September 21, 1988) is an American former professional football player who was a safety in the National Football League (NFL). He was signed by the Miami Dolphins as an undrafted free agent in 2012. He played college football for the Arkansas State Red Wolves.

McCray has also played for the Tampa Bay Buccaneers, Kansas City Chiefs, Seattle Seahawks, and Buffalo Bills.

== Professional career ==
Pre-draft measurables
Height	Weight	Arm length	Hand span	40-yard dash	20-yard shuttle	Three-cone drill	Vertical jump	Broad jump	Bench press
6 ft 1 3/4 in (1.87 m)	202 lb (92 kg)	32 1/4 in (0.82 m)	8 7/8 in (0.23 m)	4.54 s	4.29 s	7.00 s	30.5 in (0.77 m)	10 ft 2 in (3.10 m)	12 reps
All values from NFL Combine

=== Miami Dolphins ===
On May 2, 2012, McCray signed with the Miami Dolphins as an undrafted free agent. On July 31, 2012, he had scheduled surgery on his broken foot. On August 26, 2012, he was placed on Injured reserve due to a broken foot, causing him to miss the entire 2012 NFL season.

=== Tampa Bay Buccaneers ===
On October 2, 2013, he was claimed off waivers by the Tampa Bay Buccaneers.

=== Kansas City Chiefs ===
On August 21, 2014, McCray was traded to the Kansas City Chiefs for guard Rishaw Johnson. On March 13, 2015, he re-signed with the Chiefs.

=== Seattle Seahawks ===
On September 5, 2015, McCray was traded to the Seattle Seahawks for a fifth round draft pick. With the trade McCray joined the defensive unit nicknamed the Legion of Boom.

In Week 12 vs the 8-3 Vikings, he had 5 special team tackles. In Week 15 against the Cleveland Browns, McCray played his first game as a starter for the Seattle Seahawks, as teammate Kam Chancellor was injured. He recorded 8 tackles and 1 pass defended.

McCray would start again in Week 16 against the St. Louis Rams, and again in Week 17 at the Arizona Cardinals, recording 10 tackles and 1 pass defended against the Rams, and 3 tackles against the Cardinals. He finished his first season with the Seahawks with 36 tackles and 2 pass deflections.

=== Buffalo Bills ===
On January 17, 2018, McCray signed a reserve/future contract with the Buffalo Bills. He was released on September 1, 2018.
