= Malcolm Butler =

American football player (born 1990)

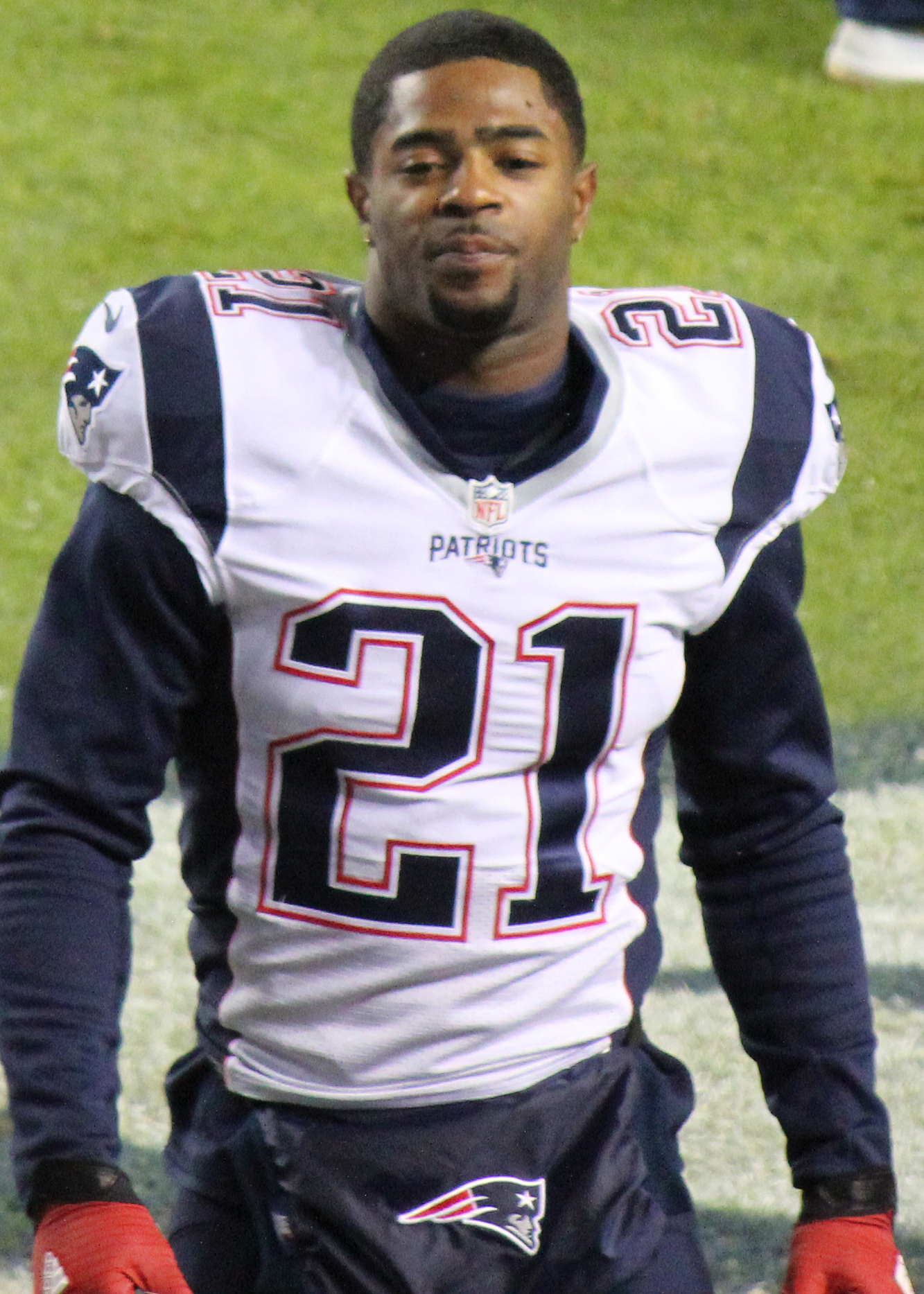
- Butler with the New England Patriots in 2015

No. 21
- Position: Cornerback

Personal information
- Born: March 2, 1990 (age 36); Vicksburg, Mississippi, U.S.
- Listed height: 5 ft 11 in (1.80 m)
- Listed weight: 190 lb (86 kg)

Career information
- High school: Vicksburg
- College: Hinds (2009, 2011); West Alabama (2012–2013)
- NFL draft: 2014: undrafted

Career history
- New England Patriots (2014–2017); Tennessee Titans (2018–2020); Arizona Cardinals (2021)*; New England Patriots (2022)*
- * Offseason or practice squad member only

Awards and highlights
- 2× Super Bowl champion (XLIX, LI); Second-team All-Pro (2016); Pro Bowl (2015); New England Patriots All-2010s Team; 2× First-team All-GSC (2012, 2013)

Career NFL statistics
- Tackles: 406
- Sacks: 3.0
- Forced fumbles: 5
- Fumble recoveries: 2
- Pass deflections: 82
- Interceptions: 17
- Defensive touchdowns: 2
- Stats at Pro Football Reference

Malcolm Terel Butler (born March 2, 1990) is an American former professional football cornerback who played in the National Football League (NFL) for seven seasons. He played college football at Hinds Community College and West Alabama Tigers before signing with the New England Patriots as an undrafted free agent in 2014. Butler was also a member of the Tennessee Titans and Arizona Cardinals.

A two-time Super Bowl champion and Pro Bowl selection during his Patriots tenure, Butler is best known for his goal line interception in the final seconds of Super Bowl XLIX. His interception, which prevented a go-ahead touchdown and effectively ensured the Patriots' victory, is regarded as one of the greatest plays in NFL history.

== Early life ==
Butler was born on March 2, 1990, in Vicksburg, Mississippi, and has four siblings. He graduated from Vicksburg High School in 2009. As a senior, Butler averaged five tackles per game. Despite only playing football in his freshman and senior years at Vicksburg, he earned a scholarship to Hinds Community College in Raymond, Mississippi. Butler also participated in track and field at Vicksburg, competing in sprints and jumps. He had personal bests of 12.07 seconds in the 100-meter dash, 1.83 meters (6'0") in the high jump, and 6.92 meters (22'8.5") in the long jump.

== College career ==
As a freshman at Hinds Community College in 2009, Butler recorded 22 tackles and an interception, but was kicked off the team after the fifth game of the season. He transferred to Alcorn State University before being invited back to Hinds Community College in 2011, and as a sophomore, Butler had 43 tackles, three interceptions, and 12 pass deflections.

In 2012, Butler enrolled at the University of West Alabama, majoring in physical education. He started all 12 games that fall for the Division II Tigers. Butler finished the season with 49 tackles, 43 solo, five interceptions (including three in a game against West Georgia), and averaged a team-leading 29.8 yards per kickoff return.

In 2013, Butler was named a Beyond Sports Network All-American after recording 45 tackles, two interceptions, and a blocked field goal, and averaging 27.9 yards on kickoff returns during the season. He played in the 2014 Medal of Honor Bowl, a postseason all-star game, registering a solo tackle and an interception.

== Professional career ==
Pre-draft measurables
Height	Weight	Arm length	Hand span	40-yard dash	10-yard split	20-yard split	20-yard shuttle	Three-cone drill	Vertical jump	Broad jump	Bench press
5 ft 9 3/4 in (1.77 m)	187 lb (85 kg)	31 1/8 in (0.79 m)	9 1/2 in (0.24 m)	4.62 s	1.62 s	2.75 s	4.27 s	7.20 s	33.5 in (0.85 m)	9 ft 10 in (3.00 m)	13 reps
All values are from Alabama’s Pro Day

=== New England Patriots ===
==== 2014 season ====
Butler received an invitation to attend the New England Patriots' rookie minicamp, and after impressing coaches with his performance, Butler was signed to a three-year, $1.53 million contract on May 19, 2014. During training camp, he competed for a roster spot against Dax Swanson, Justin Green, and Jemea Thomas. Butler had an impressive preseason and earned a roster spot as the sixth cornerback on the Patriots’ depth chart. Head coach Bill Belichick named Butler the sixth cornerback, behind Darrelle Revis, Alfonzo Dennard, Logan Ryan, Kyle Arrington, and Brandon Browner.

Butler made his NFL debut during the season opener against the Miami Dolphins and finished the 33–20 road loss with two solo tackles. In the next game against the Minnesota Vikings, Butler recorded a solo tackle during the 30–7 road victory. He was inactive for three games as a healthy scratch (Weeks 5–7) after Alfonzo Dennard returned from injury.

During a Week 9 43–21 victory over the Denver Broncos, Butler had a season-high four solo tackles and a pass deflection. He was inactive for another two games (Weeks 12–13) as a healthy scratch. During Week 15 against the Dolphins, Butler earned his first NFL start and recorded two combined tackles (one solo) in the 41–13 victory. In the regular-season finale against the Buffalo Bills, Butler had a season-high five combined tackles (four solo) during the 17–9 loss.

Butler finished his rookie year with 15 combined tackles (14 solo) and three pass deflections in 11 games and one start. The Patriots finished atop the AFC East with a 12–4 record and qualified for the playoffs as the #1-seed. In the Divisional Round against the Baltimore Ravens, Butler made his postseason debut, but recorded no statistics during the 35–31 victory. During the AFC Championship Game against the Indianapolis Colts, Butler had a solo tackle in the 45–7 victory as the Patriots advanced to Super Bowl XLIX.

===== Super Bowl XLIX =====
Butler began the Super Bowl as the fifth cornerback on the Patriots' depth chart. He entered the game in the third quarter at nickelback after Kyle Arrington struggled to cover Chris Matthews. When Butler was inserted in the line-up, Seattle had scored on four straight offensive possessions. He was assigned to cover Jermaine Kearse with Brandon Browner covering Chris Matthews. On a first down, Seattle handed off to Marshawn Lynch; Butler made the initial tackle, and Lynch was held to two yards. On the next play, Russell Wilson completed a pass to Kearse, and Butler made the tackle, holding the Seahawks to a five-yard gain. On 3rd-and-3, Wilson threw deep to Kearse and Butler broke up the pass, forcing Seattle to punt. Seattle did not score again.

With under a minute left in the fourth quarter, Butler continued to cover wide receiver Jermaine Kearse and deflected a 33-yard pass by Russell Wilson. The deflected ball landed on Kearse as he fell to the ground and allowed him to juggle the ball and to complete the reception in what was described as one of the greatest catches in Super Bowl history. After recognizing that Kearse had made the catch and was not down by contact, Butler pushed Kearse out of bounds at the five-yard line.

Two plays later, with 20 seconds remaining and the Seahawks in position to score on the Patriots' one-yard line, Butler intercepted a pass intended for wide receiver Ricardo Lockette at the goal line, returning possession to the Patriots and maintaining the Patriots' 28–24 lead. Butler said that he had guessed correctly that Wilson would throw to Lockette, having read the Seahawks two-receiver stack formation. Butler stated, "From preparation, I remembered the formation they were in ... I just beat him to the route and made the play." He gave credit to Patriots defensive coordinator Matt Patricia for preparing players well for the game. The interception was the first of Butler's NFL career. It was the only interception of a pass attempt from the one-yard line during the 2014 NFL season, out of 109 such attempts. Patriots quarterback Tom Brady, who received a 2015 Chevrolet Colorado as part of his Super Bowl XLIX MVP Award, said that he planned to give the truck to Butler. At the request of Brady, Chevrolet awarded the truck directly to Butler.

==== 2015 season ====
Following the departures of Darrelle Revis, Brandon Browner, and Kyle Arrington, Butler was promoted to a starting cornerback position at the start of the 2015 season.

Butler began the season recording five combined tackles (three solo) in the season-opening 28–21 victory over the Pittsburgh Steelers. In the next game against the Bills, he had six combined tackles (four solo), a pass deflection, and his first regular-season interception during the 40–32 road victory. The following week against the Jacksonville Jaguars, Butler recorded four solo tackles and three pass deflections in the 51–17 victory.

Following a Week 4 bye, the Patriots went on the road to face the Dallas Cowboys. Butler finished the 30–6 victory with a solo tackle and a pass deflection. In the next game against the Colts, he recorded a season-high eight combined tackles (seven solo) and two pass deflections during the 34–27 road victory. Three weeks later against the Washington Redskins, Butler had five combined tackles (four solo) and a pass deflection in the 27–10 victory.

During a narrow Week 10 27–26 road victory over the New York Giants, Butler had two solo tackles and tied his season-high of three pass deflections as he was matched up against Odell Beckham Jr., who made four receptions for 104 yards and a touchdown on 12 targets. Butler made a strip of Beckham in the end zone when it looked like Beckham had secured possession of the football for a touchdown. The touchdown, which would have given the Giants the lead with 1:45 to play, was nullified by the officials and helped the Patriots hold the Giants to a field goal, after which Stephen Gostkowski kicked a game-winning 54-yard field goal. In the next game against the Bills on Monday Night Football, Butler recorded three solo tackles and held wide receiver Sammy Watkins to 39 yards on three receptions during the 20–13 victory. The following week against the Denver Broncos on Sunday Night Football, Butler had seven solo tackles and a pass deflection in the 30–24 overtime road loss.

During Week 13 against the Philadelphia Eagles, Butler recorded a solo tackle and an interception in the 35–28 loss. In the next game against the Houston Texans on Sunday Night Football, he once again had a solo tackle and a pass deflection during the 27–6 road victory. The following week against the Tennessee Titans, Butler recorded five combined tackles (three solo), a pass deflection, and an interception in the 33–16 victory.

On December 22, 2015, Butler was named to the 2016 Pro Bowl. He finished his second professional season with 67 combined tackles (56 solo), 15 pass deflections, and two interceptions in 16 games and starts. Butler led all Patriots in total snaps, and was the only Patriot defensive player to play more than 90 percent of defensive snaps in 2015. As a result of his high snap count and low salary, Butler received a performance-based pay bonus of $319,282.65, the highest of any Patriot in 2015 and the fifth-highest in the league. The Patriots finished atop the AFC East with a 12–4 record and qualified for the playoffs as the #2-seed. In the Divisional Round against the Kansas City Chiefs, Butler had five combined tackles (four solo) and a pass deflection during the 27–20 victory. During the AFC Championship Game against the Broncos, he recorded seven combined tackles (six solo) and two pass deflections in the narrow 20–18 road loss.

==== 2016 season ====
During the season-opener against the Arizona Cardinals on Sunday Night Football, Butler had four combined tackles (three solo) and two pass deflections in the 23–21 road victory. In the next game against the Dolphins, he recorded eight combined tackles (seven solo) and a pass deflection during the 31–24 victory. The following week against the Texans on Thursday Night Football, Butler had four combined tackles (two solo) and a pass deflection in the 27–0 shutout victory.

During Week 6 against the Cincinnati Bengals, Butler recorded three combined tackles (two solo) and a season-high four pass deflections in the 35–17 victory. In the next game against the Steelers, he had six combined tackles (three solo), three pass deflections, and his first interception of the season off a pass from backup quarterback Landry Jones intended for wide receiver Antonio Brown during the 27–16 road victory. Three weeks later against the Seahawks on Sunday Night Football, Butler recorded a season-high nine combined tackles (seven solo) in the 31–24 loss.

During a Week 11 30–17 road victory over the San Francisco 49ers, Butler had two solo tackles and his first NFL sack on Colin Kaepernick. In the next game against the New York Jets, Butler recorded five solo tackles, a forced fumble, and a fumble recovery during the 22–17 road victory. The following week against the Los Angeles Rams, he had a solo tackle, three pass deflections, and his second interception of the season off of rookie quarterback Jared Goff.

During Week 14 against the Ravens on Monday Night Football, Butler recorded four combined tackles (three solo) and a pass deflection in the 30–23 victory. Two weeks later against the Jets on Christmas Eve, he had the first multi-interception game of his career after picking off both Bryce Petty and Ryan Fitzpatrick while also deflecting two passes and recovering a fumble during the 41–3 blowout victory.

Butler finished the 2016 season with 63 combined tackles (48 solo), 17 pass deflections, four interceptions, a sack, a forced fumble, and two fumble recoveries in 16 games and starts. He was named second-team All-Pro by Pro Football Focus and the Associated Press. The Patriots finished atop the AFC East with a 14–2 record and qualified for the playoffs as the #1-seed. In the Divisional Round against the Texans, Butler had five solo tackles during the 34–16 victory. During the AFC Championship Game against the Steelers, he recorded four combined tackles (three solo) and a pass deflection in the 36–17 victory as the Patriots advanced to Super Bowl LI. In the Super Bowl against the Atlanta Falcons, Butler had two combined tackles (one solo) during the 34–28 comeback overtime victory.

Butler was ranked 99th by his fellow players on the NFL Top 100 Players of 2017.

==== 2017 season ====
Set to be a restricted free agent, the Patriots gave Butler a first-round tender worth $3.91 million on March 7, 2017. On April 18, he officially signed his tender with the Patriots. After the Patriots signed former Bills' cornerback Stephon Gilmore to a five-year, $65 million contract in free agency, Butler was demoted to the No. 2 starting cornerback after sitting atop the depth chart the previous two seasons.

During the season-opening 42–27 loss to the Chiefs, Butler recorded four solo tackles. In the next game against the New Orleans Saints, he had two solo tackles and a pass deflection during the 36–20 road victory. Two weeks later against the Carolina Panthers, Butler recorded a season-high eight combined tackles (seven solo), a pass deflection, and his first interception of the season off a pass from Cam Newton in the 33–30 loss.

During a Week 5 19–14 road victory over the Tampa Bay Buccaneers on Thursday Night Football, Butler had four combined tackles (three solo) and a pass deflection. In the next game against the Jets, he recorded four solo tackles, three pass deflections, a forced fumble, and an interception during the 24–17 victory. The following week against the Falcons on Sunday Night Football, Butler had six solo tackles and a pass deflection in the 23–7 victory.

During Week 10 against the Broncos on Sunday Night Football, Butler recorded three solo tackles and a pass deflection in the 41–16 road victory. In the next game against the Oakland Raiders at Estadio Azteca, he had two solo tackles and a pass deflection during the 33–8 victory. The following week against the Dolphins, Butler recorded four combined tackles (three solo), two pass deflections, and a forced fumble in the 35–17 victory.

During a Week 13 23–3 road victory over the Bills, Butler tied his season-high of eight combined tackles (seven solo). Three weeks later against the Bills, Butler had three solo tackles, a pass deflection, and a strip-sack on Tyrod Taylor in the 37–16 victory.

Butler finished the 2017 season with 60 combined tackles (55 solo), 12 pass deflections, a sack, two interceptions, and three forced fumbles in 16 games and 15 starts. The Patriots finished atop the AFC East with a 13–3 record and qualified for the playoffs as the #1-seed. In the Divisional Round against the Titans, Butler had four solo tackles during the 35–14 victory. During the AFC Championship Game against the Jaguars, he recorded six combined tackles (four solo) and a pass deflection in the 24–20 comeback victory as the Patriots advanced to Super Bowl LII. In the Super Bowl against the Eagles, Butler did not play any defensive snaps as he only came in for a single play on special teams during the 41–33 loss.

After the game, Patriots head coach Bill Belichick said his lack of playing time was a "coach's decision," not due to disciplinary issues. When asked about the benching, Butler stated: "I don't know what it was. I guess I wasn't playing good or they didn't feel comfortable. I don't know. But I could have changed that game." By the next morning, reports claimed that Belichick acknowledged a "much longer discussion" could occur regarding Butler's absence on defense from the game. Patriots beat writer Kevin Duffy revealed that Butler was demoted in practice during the Wild Card round of the playoffs, during which the Patriots had a bye week. Later in the week, Butler released a statement regarding his benching for the game. It was also revealed that owner Robert Kraft was not informed ahead of time regarding Butler being benched.

=== Tennessee Titans ===
==== 2018 season ====
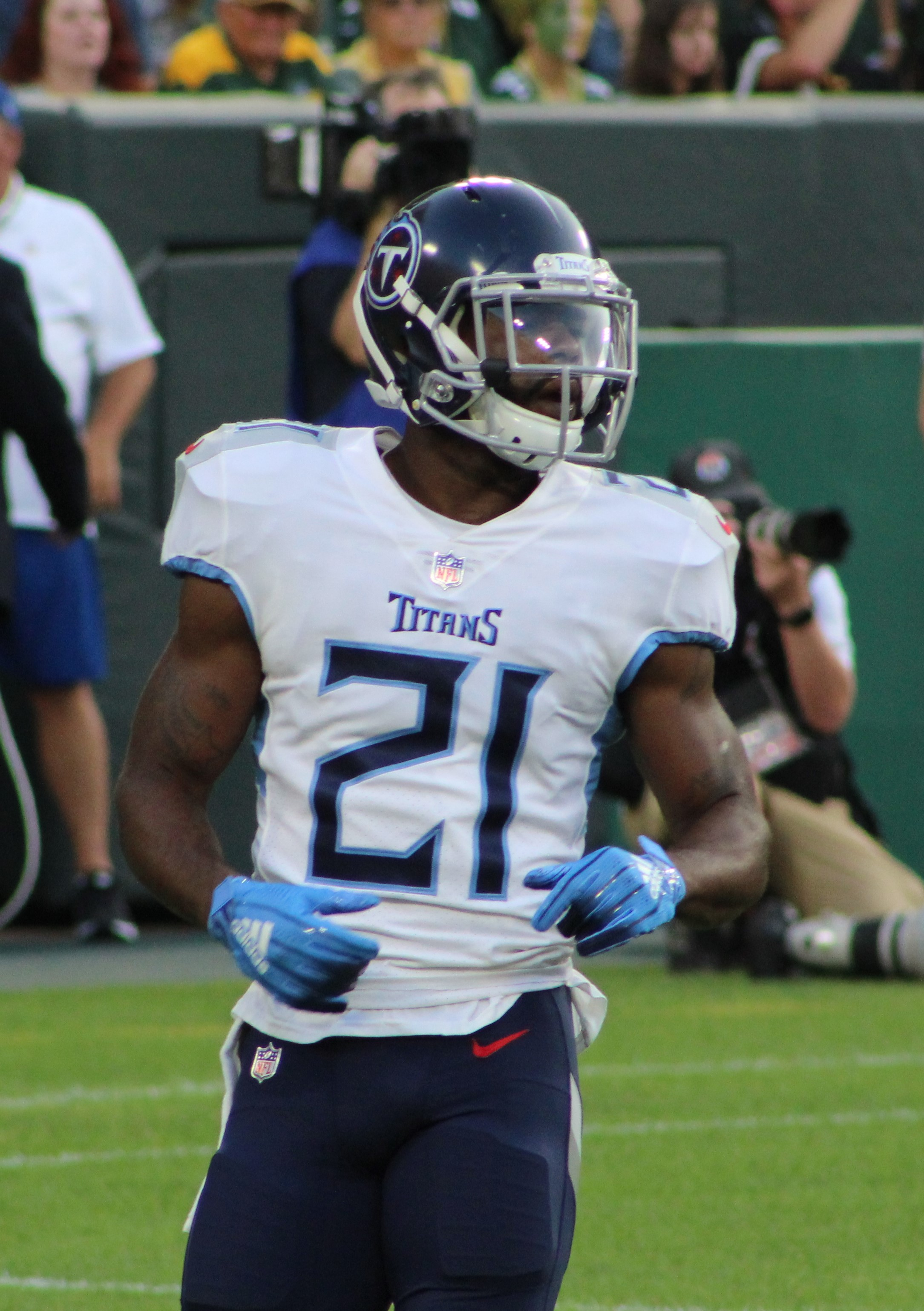
Butler in 2018

On March 15, 2018, Butler signed a five-year, $61 million contract with the Tennessee Titans with $30 million guaranteed, reuniting him with former Patriots teammate Logan Ryan.

Butler made his Titans debut during the season-opener against the Dolphins and finished the 27–20 road loss with five combined tackles (four solo), two pass deflections, and his first interception of the season off of Ryan Tannehill. In the next game against the Texans, Butler recorded seven solo tackles and two pass deflections during the 20–17 victory. Two weeks later against the Eagles, Butler had a season-high 10 combined tackles (nine solo) and his first sack of the season on Carson Wentz in the 26–23 overtime victory. Overall, Butler struggled mightily in the first half of the season, but he got better as the season progressed.

During a Week 11 38–10 road loss to the Colts, Butler recorded three solo tackles and a pass deflection. Two weeks later against the Jets, he had six combined tackles (three solo), a pass deflection, and an interception. His interception came in the final seconds of the game and sealed the 26–22 victory for the Titans. In the next game against the Jaguars on Thursday Night Football, Butler recorded four solo tackles and two pass deflections during the 30–9 victory.

During Week 16 against the Redskins, Butler had five solo tackles, a pass deflection, and scored his first NFL touchdown after he intercepted Josh Johnson and returned it 56 yards on the final play of the 25–16 victory. In the regular-season finale against the Colts, Butler recorded six combined tackles (five solo) and two pass deflections during the 33–17 loss.

Butler finished his first season with the Titans with a career-high 69 combined tackles (nine solo), 12 pass deflections, three interceptions, a sack, and a touchdown in 16 games and 11 starts.

==== 2019 season ====
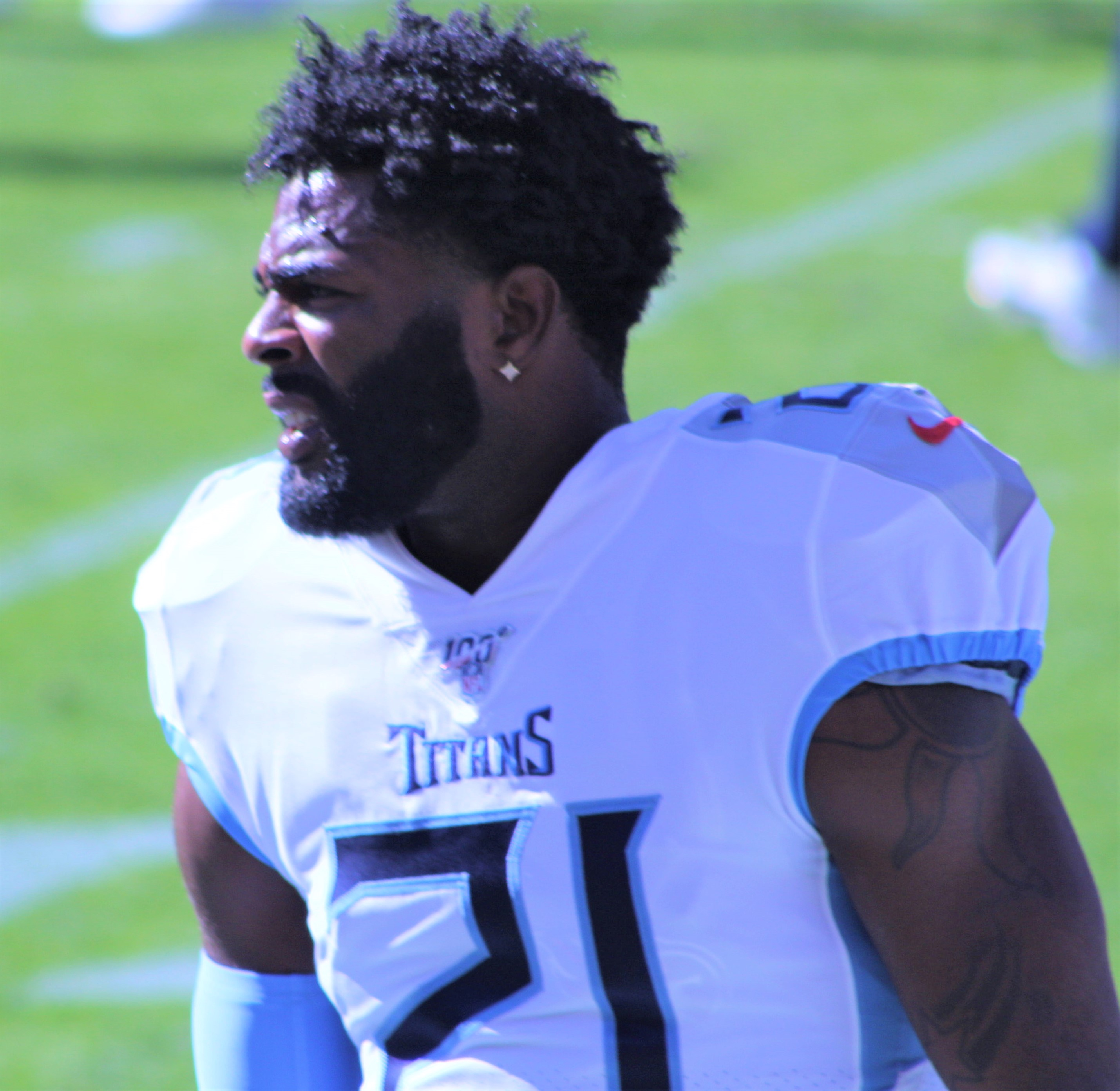
Butler in 2019

During the season-opening 43–13 road victory over the Cleveland Browns, Butler recorded two solo tackles, a pass deflection, and his first interception of the season off of Baker Mayfield and returned it for a 38-yard touchdown. In the next game against the Colts, Butler had a season-high six combined tackles (five solo) and a pass deflection during the narrow 19–17 loss. The following week against the Jaguars on Thursday Night Football, he recorded five combined tackles (four solo) and a pass deflection in the 20–7 road loss.

During Week 4 against the Falcons, Butler tied his season-high of six combined tackles (five solo) in the 24–10 road victory. Two weeks later against the Broncos, he had a tackle and two pass deflections in the 16–0 shutout road loss. In the next game against the Los Angeles Chargers, Butler once again tied his season-high of six combined tackles (three solo) while also deflecting a pass during the 23–20 victory.

During Week 8 against the Tampa Bay Buccaneers, Butler recorded two solo tackles, a pass deflection, and his second interception of the season by picking off Jameis Winston in the 27–23 victory. In the next game against the Panthers, Butler had two pass deflections before leaving the eventual 30–20 road loss during the second quarter with a wrist injury. Butler was placed on injured reserve on November 5, 2019. Without Butler, the Titans finished 9–7 for the fourth consecutive year and lost to the Chiefs in the AFC Championship Game.

Butler finished the 2019 season with 32 combined tackles (25 solo), nine pass deflections, two interceptions, and a touchdown in nine games and starts.

==== 2020 season ====
Butler returned from his injury in time for the season-opener against the Broncos on Monday Night Football and finished the narrow 16–14 victory with three solo tackles. In the next game against the Jaguars, Butler had a season-high 11 combined tackles (eight solo) and two pass deflections during the 33–30 victory. The following week against the Vikings, he recorded four solo tackles and two pass deflections in the narrow 31–30 road victory.

Following a Week 4 bye, the Titans returned home to face the Bills on Tuesday Night Football. Butler finished the 42–16 victory with seven solo tackles, two pass deflections, and two interceptions off of Josh Allen. In the next game against the Texans, Butler recorded eight solo tackles and a pass deflection during the 42–36 victory. The following week against the Steelers, he had a team-high eight combined tackles (tied with Jayon Brown) in the 27–24 loss.

During a Week 8 31–20 road loss against the Bengals, Butler had eight combined tackles (four solo) and a pass deflection. In the next game against the Chicago Bears, Butler had four combined tackles (three solo) and two pass deflections during the 24–17 victory. The following week against the Colts on Thursday Night Football, he recorded seven combined tackles (five solo) and a pass deflection in the 34–17 loss.

During Week 14 against the Jaguars, Butler had three solo tackles, two pass deflections, and his third interception of the season off of Mike Glennon in the 31–10 road victory. Two weeks later against the Green Bay Packers on Sunday Night Football, Butler recorded six solo tackles, a pass deflection, and his fourth interception of the season off of Aaron Rodgers during the 14–40 loss.

Butler finished the 2020 season with a career-high 100 combined tackles (86 solo), four interceptions, and 14 pass deflections in 16 games and starts. The Titans finished atop the AFC South with an 11–5 record and qualified for the playoffs as the #4-seed. During the Wild Card Round against the Ravens, Butler had five tackles, two pass deflections, and an interception off of Lamar Jackson in the 20–13 loss.

On March 10, 2021, the Titans released Butler, shoring up $10 million in cap space.

=== Arizona Cardinals ===
On March 30, 2021, Butler signed a one-year contract with the Arizona Cardinals. On August 31, he decided to retire for personal reasons, and the Cardinals placed Butler on the reserve/retired list that same day.

On February 18, 2022, the Cardinals formally released Butler.

=== New England Patriots (second stint) ===
On March 24, 2022, Butler came out of retirement and signed a two-year contract to return to the Patriots. He was placed on injured reserve on August 16, and was released nine days later.

=== Retirement ===
Butler announced his retirement from professional football on March 9, 2024.

== NFL career statistics ==
Legend
	Won the Super Bowl
**Bold**	Career high

=== Regular season ===
Year	Team	Games		Tackles				Interceptions						Fumbles	
Year	Team	GP	GS	Cmb	Solo	Ast	Sck	PD	Int	Yds	Avg	Lng	TD	FF	FR
2014	NE	11	1	15	14	1	0.0	4	0	0	0.0	0	0	0	0
2015	NE	**16**	**16**	67	56	11	0.0	15	2	9	4.5	9	0	0	0
2016	NE	**16**	**16**	63	48	**15**	**1.0**	**17**	**4**	28	7.0	21	0	1	**2**
2017	NE	**16**	15	60	55	5	**1.0**	12	2	−1	−.5	1	0	**3**	0
2018	TEN	**16**	11	69	60	9	**1.0**	12	3	90	30.0	56T	**1**	1	0
2019	TEN	9	9	32	25	7	0.0	9	2	61	**30.5**	38T	**1**	0	0
2020	TEN	**16**	**16**	**100**	**86**	14	0.0	14	**4**	**111**	27.8	**68**	0	0	0
Career		100	84	406	344	62	3.0	82	17	298	17.5	68	2	5	2

=== Postseason ===
Year	Team	Games		Tackles				Interceptions						Fumbles	
Year	Team	GP	GS	Cmb	Solo	Ast	Sck	PD	Int	Yds	Avg	Lng	TD	FF	FR
2014	NE	**3**	0	4	3	0	0.0	**3**	**1**	**3**	**3.0**	**3**	0	0	0
2015	NE	2	2	**12**	**10**	**2**	0.0	**3**	0	0	0.0	0	0	0	0
2016	NE	**3**	**3**	11	9	**2**	0.0	1	0	0	0.0	0	0	0	0
2017	NE	**3**	2	10	8	**2**	0.0	1	0	0	0.0	0	0	0	0
2019	TEN	0	0	Did not play due to injury											
2020	TEN	1	1	5	4	1	0.0	2	**1**	0	0.0	0	0	0	0
Career		12	8	42	35	7	0.0	10	2	3	1.5	3	0	0	0

== Film ==
In February 2017, The Hollywood Reporter published an article stating that the production company Narrative Capital had acquired the rights to the story of Butler and his agent Derek Simpson for a film tentatively titled The Secondary.

== Legal issues ==
Butler was arrested in North Providence, Rhode Island on March 16, 2024, and charged with one count of driving under the influence five days later. The arresting officer reported that he had observed a "strong odor of alcoholic beverages coming from his breath." According to the police report, Butler was also "sweating profusely" and had "extremely slurred and delayed speech along with severely bloodshot watery eyes." When asked if he had been drinking, Butler replied "Just take me to jail" and refused to take either a field sobriety test or breathalyzer.
