= Brandon Browner =

American football player (born 1984)

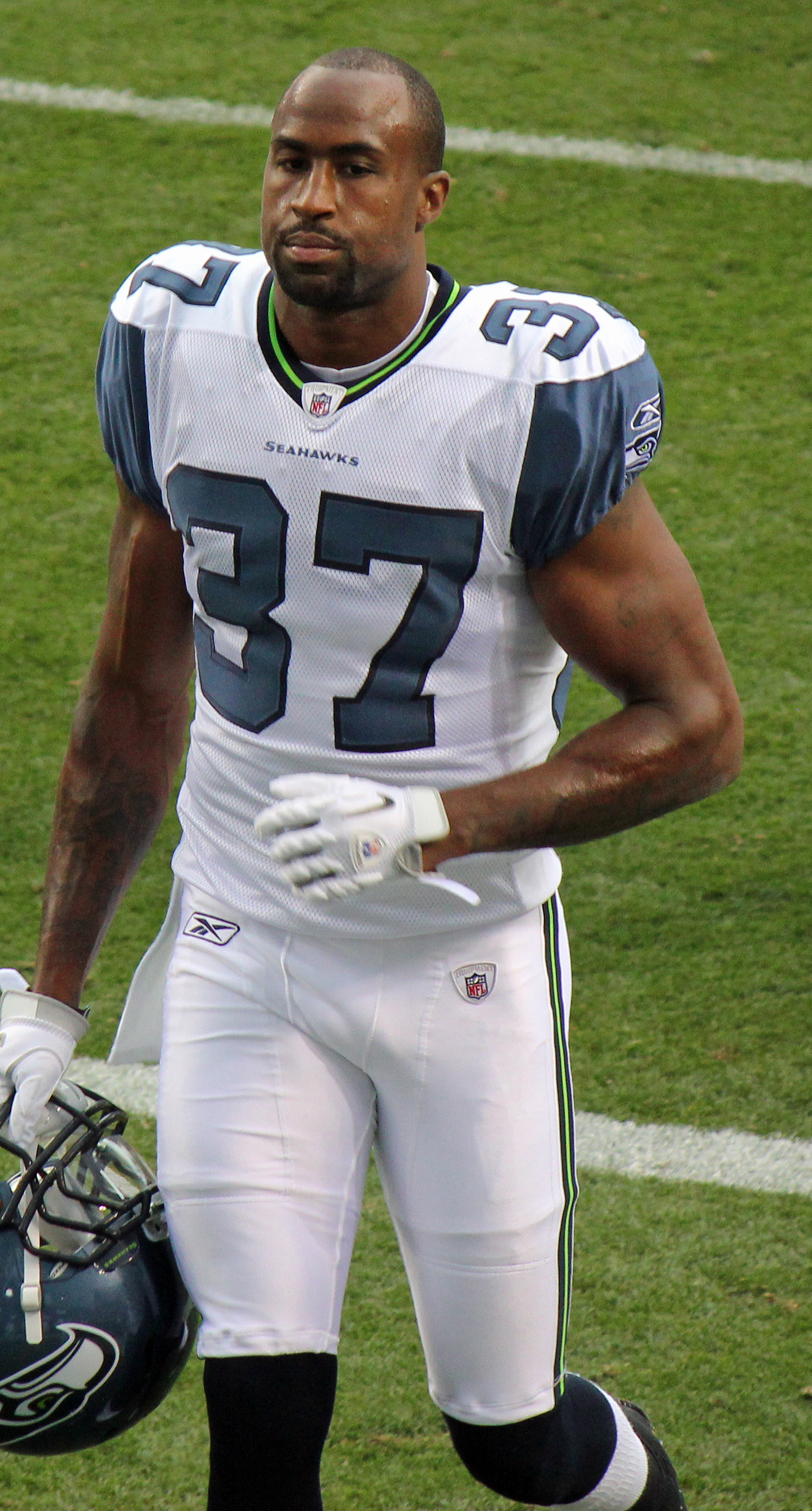
- Browner with the Seattle Seahawks in 2011

No. 27, 39
- Position: Cornerback

Personal information
- Born: August 2, 1984 (age 42); Los Angeles, California, U.S.
- Listed height: 6 ft 4 in (1.93 m)
- Listed weight: 221 lb (100 kg)

Career information
- High school: Sylmar (Sylmar, California)
- College: Oregon State (2002–2004)
- NFL draft: 2005: undrafted

Career history
- Denver Broncos (2005); Calgary Stampeders (2006–2010); Seattle Seahawks (2011–2013); New England Patriots (2014); New Orleans Saints (2015); Seattle Seahawks (2016)*
- * Offseason or practice squad member only

Awards and highlights
- 2× Super Bowl champion (XLVIII, XLIX); Pro Bowl (2011); Grey Cup champion (2008); 3× CFL All-Star (2008–2010); 3× CFL West All-Star (2008–2010); Second-team All-Pac-10 (2004); Pac-10 Freshman of the Year (2003)

Career NFL statistics
- Total tackles: 218
- Forced fumbles: 3
- Fumble recoveries: 2
- Pass deflections: 57
- Interceptions: 12
- Defensive touchdowns: 2
- Stats at Pro Football Reference

Career CFL statistics
- Games played: 68
- Total tackles: 196
- Interceptions: 12
- Forced fumbles: 8
- Stats at CFL.ca

Brandon Kemar Browner (born August 2, 1984) is an American former professional football player who was a cornerback in the National Football League (NFL) for the Seattle Seahawks, New England Patriots, and New Orleans Saints, and in the Canadian Football League (CFL) for the Calgary Stampeders. He played college football for the Oregon State Beavers before signing with the Denver Broncos as an undrafted free agent in 2005.

Browner spent four seasons with the Stampeders in the CFL, where he was a three-time CFL All-Star and won a Grey Cup championship in 2008. He signed with the Seattle Seahawks prior to the 2011 season, where he became a founding member of the Legion of Boom defense. In 2011 he led the Seahawks with six interceptions and made the 2012 Pro Bowl, the only one of his career. After winning the Super Bowl with Seattle in 2013 and the New England Patriots in 2014, Browner became one of the few players to win consecutive Super Bowls as a member of two different teams.

In 2018, Browner was arrested for attempted murder, for which he was sentenced to eight years in prison.

== Early life ==
Browner was a Prep Star West All-Region and All-Valley Mission League selection at Sylmar High School (northern area of Los Angeles) as a senior. He also earned Mission League MVP honors. As a junior, Browner played at James Monroe High School in North Hills, Los Angeles. During his prep career, he competed as a receiver where he accounted for 1,726 career yards and 24 touchdowns, and on defense as a cornerback where he recorded 16 career interceptions. As a senior, he also returned three punts for touchdowns. Browner also lettered in track and field at James Monroe, competing in the high jump, triple jump and 200 meters.

== College career ==
Browner played in college for Oregon State University. Browner redshirted in 2002 at Oregon State. He then went on to start in every game he played in for the Beavers. Browner was named to the Freshman All-America teams by the Football Writers Association and The Sporting News in 2003. He was chosen Pac-10 Conference Freshman of the Year and was a member of the All-Pac-10 second-team. He ranked ninth in the nation with six interceptions and recorded 43 tackles (37 solo) with six pass breakups, two forced fumbles and three stops for losses as a redshirt freshman. He helped the program weather the 2002 departures of Dennis Weathersby, Calvin Carlyle and Terrell Roberts.

Browner added All-America and All-Pac-10 Conference honors from The NFL Draft Report in 2004. Lining up at right cornerback, he regularly faced the opponent's top receiver. Browner recorded 44 tackles (37 solo) with a sack, nine pass deflections and a blocked kick in 2004. He finished his two-year collegiate career with 87 tackles (74 solo), a 2-yard sack, five stops for losses of 16 yards, two forced fumbles, 15 pass deflections, six interceptions for 74 yards in returns, and a touchdown.

== Professional career ==
Pre-draft measurables
Height	Weight	Arm length	Hand span	Wingspan	40-yard dash	10-yard split	20-yard split	20-yard shuttle	Three-cone drill	Vertical jump	Broad jump	Bench press
6 ft 3 1/2 in (1.92 m)	221 lb (100 kg)	32 3/4 in (0.83 m)	9 1/8 in (0.23 m)	6 ft 8 in (2.03 m)	4.68 s	1.67 s	2.77 s	4.24 s	7.20 s	36.5 in (0.93 m)	10 ft 3 in (3.12 m)	13 reps
All values from NFL Combine

=== Denver Broncos ===
Browner was signed as an undrafted free agent by the Denver Broncos in 2005. However, Browner fractured his left forearm August 20 against San Francisco, was placed on injured reserve on August 25, 2005, and he missed the entire 2005 season before being waived on July 24, 2006.

=== Calgary Stampeders ===
Browner signed with the Calgary Stampeders in 2006. His speed and competitive effort made him a fan favorite in his time with the team. He won the 2008 Grey Cup with Calgary and was named a CFL All-Star for the season. Browner was also selected to the CFL All-Star team after the 2009 season.

=== Seattle Seahawks (first stint) ===
Browner signed with the Seattle Seahawks and started every game of the 2011 season. Highlights of that season included a Seattle-record 94-yard interception return against the New York Giants in a Week 5 victory and two interceptions in a win against Vince Young and the Philadelphia Eagles on December 1, 2011. Browner was suspended for four games in 2012 for violating the NFL's performance-enhancing drug policy for using a prescription drug. Despite this setback, Browner was added to the 2012 Pro Bowl roster as a replacement for an injured Carlos Rogers.

On December 18, 2013, the NFL erroneously reported Browner was facing an indefinite suspension for again violating the NFL's performance-enhancing drug rules. The suspension kept him from playing in Super Bowl XLVIII against the Denver Broncos. Without Browner, the Seahawks won the Super Bowl 43–8 to give the franchise their first championship.

The suspension was later changed to reflect a substance abuse issue related to missing drug tests during the time Browner was unsigned by an NFL team and played football in the CFL, prior to the Seahawks contract. On March 4, 2014, he was officially reinstated by the NFL. His suspension was reduced to the first four games of the 2014 season.

=== New England Patriots ===
On March 14, 2014, Browner signed with the New England Patriots on a three-year, $17 million contract. After serving his 4-game suspension, Browner was inactive for the next 2 games. He made his season debut in week 7 against the New York Jets, where Browner recorded a tackle. Browner finished the season with 25 tackles and an interception in 9 games. He helped the Patriots win Super Bowl XLIX over his former team, the Seattle Seahawks 28–24. In the Super Bowl, Browner recorded three tackles. With 26 seconds left, he blocked Jermaine Kearse on a pick play on second and goal from the one yard line, enabling Malcolm Butler to make the game-sealing interception.

At the start of free agency, the Patriots did not pick up a $2 million roster bonus due to him, making him a free agent eligible to sign with any team.

=== New Orleans Saints ===
On March 12, 2015, Browner signed with the New Orleans Saints. In September, he was elected as one of the defensive team captains (along with Cameron Jordan). Browner finished with 76 tackles and 1 interception. Browner's year in New Orleans was not a successful one: he ended the season rated as one of the least effective cornerbacks in the league, and received more penalties for the season than any player in the league since this statistic began tracking in 1999. On February 2, 2016, Browner tweeted that the Saints were going to release him. On March 10, Browner was released. In late May 2016, Browner received attention when he responded to criticism from a Saints fan on Instagram about his performance and salary, stating that he "took that few millions (and) ran with it" when he left the Saints.

=== Seattle Seahawks (second stint) ===
On April 17, 2016, Browner signed a one-year deal for the veteran minimum salary ($760,000) with his former team, the Seattle Seahawks, reforming the original Legion of Boom. Seahawks head coach Pete Carroll stated Browner would play a different role than the previous stint with the Seahawks as a hybrid corner/safety/linebacker in the nickel package. However, the Seahawks released Browner on August 29, after the team's third preseason game.

=== Flag football ===
In 2018, Browner was a member of the Roadrunners led by retired quarterback Michael Vick as part of the American Flag Football League.

== NFL career statistics ==
Legend
	Won the Super Bowl
**Bold**	Career high

Year	Team	Games		Tackles				Fumbles			Interceptions					
Year	Team	GP	GS	Cmb	Solo	Ast	Sck	FF	FR	TD	Int	Yds	Avg	Lng	TD	PD
2011	SEA	16	16	54	51	3	0.0	0	0	0	6	220	36.7	94	2	23
2012	SEA	12	12	44	35	9	0.0	3	1	0	3	39	13.0	35	0	6
2013	SEA	8	8	19	18	1	0.0	0	0	0	1	49	49.0	49	0	10
2014	NE	9	9	25	20	5	0.0	0	0	0	1	32	32.0	32	0	6
2015	NO	16	16	76	63	13	0.0	0	1	0	1	0	0.0	0	0	10
Career		61	61	218	187	31	0.0	3	2	0	12	340	28.3	94	2	55

In 2015 Browner led the NFL in penalties committed during the regular season, and was 2nd in 2011 and 2014.

== Career highlights ==
=== Awards and honors ===
NFL

- 2× Super Bowl champion (XLVIII, XLIX)
- Pro Bowl (2011)

CFL

- Grey Cup champion (2008)
- 3× CFL All-Star (2008–2010)
- 3× CFL West All-Star (2008–2010)

College

- Second-team All-Pac-10 (2004)
- Pac-10 Freshman of the Year (2003)

=== Seahawks franchise records ===
- Most interception yards returned (season): 220 (2011)

== Legal issues ==
On May 25, 2017, Browner was arrested by Los Angeles police for possession of cocaine and being under the influence.

On September 11, 2017, La Verne police arrested Browner for felony suspicion of making criminal threats.

On July 8, 2018, Browner was arrested by La Verne police for breaking and entering into the residence of a woman with whom he once had a relationship, and fleeing the scene after stealing a Rolex within the home. Two days later, he was officially charged with attempted murder and three other felonies. On December 4, 2018, Browner was sentenced to eight years in prison after pleading no contest to an attempted murder charge. He became eligible for parole in November 2023.
