= 2015 Seattle Seahawks season =

American football team season

- Owner: Paul Allen
- General manager: John Schneider
- Head coach: Pete Carroll
- Offensive coordinator: Darrell Bevell
- Defensive coordinator: Kris Richard
- Home stadium: CenturyLink Field

Results
- Record: 10–6
- Division place: 2nd NFC West
- Playoffs: Won Wild Card Playoffs (at Vikings) 10–9; Lost Divisional Playoffs (at Panthers) 24–31
- All-Pros: 3: KR Tyler Lockett (1st team); MLB Bobby Wagner (2nd team); CB Richard Sherman (2nd team)
- Pro Bowlers: 7: QB Russell Wilson; DE Michael Bennett; MLB Bobby Wagner; CB Richard Sherman; FS Earl Thomas; SS Kam Chancellor; RS Tyler Lockett

Uniform
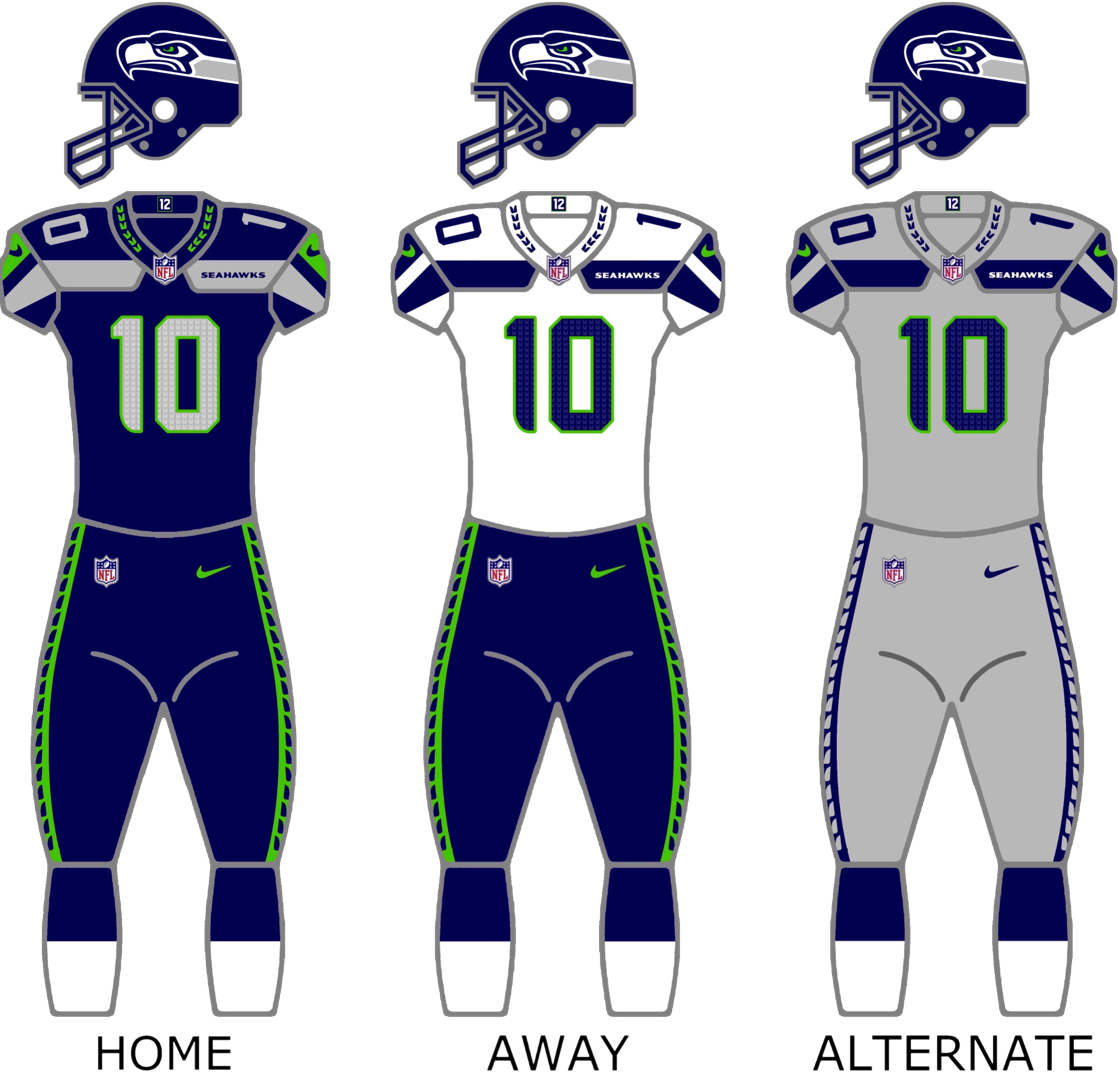

The 2015 season was the Seattle Seahawks' 40th in the National Football League (NFL) and their sixth under head coach Pete Carroll.

The Seahawks started the season 2–4, after blowing a number of fourth quarter leads, but they then proceeded to win eight of their last ten games, finishing the season 10–6 and clinching the #6 seed in the NFC playoffs. This marked the fourth consecutive season in which the Seahawks secured double digit wins. However, after a Week 10 loss to the Arizona Cardinals, the Seahawks failed to improve on their 12–4 record from 2014. Additionally, the Seahawks failed to win their third consecutive NFC West title after the Cardinals' Week 15 win over the Philadelphia Eagles. During their winning streak, the team clinched a playoff spot with a Week 15 win over the Cleveland Browns. In a five-game winning streak between Weeks 10 and 15, quarterback Russell Wilson posted a passer rating of over 120 in each game, the longest such streak in league history. Wilson led the NFL in passer rating for the season.

The Seahawks defeated the Minnesota Vikings in the Wild Card round after the Vikings blew a potential game-winning field goal attempt. In the Divisional round, the Seahawks fell behind 31–0 to the Carolina Panthers at halftime and ultimately lost 31–24, ending their hopes of becoming the first team since the 1990–1993 Buffalo Bills to appear in three consecutive Super Bowls.

This season marked the fourth year in a row that Seattle's defense ranked first in scoring defense. The only other team to accomplish this feat were the Cleveland Browns of the 1950s.

== 2015 draft class ==
2015 Seattle Seahawks draft
Round	Selection	Player	Position	College
2	63	Frank Clark	DE	Michigan
3	69	Tyler Lockett	WR	Kansas State
4	130	Terry Poole	OT	San Diego State
4	134	Mark Glowinski	G	West Virginia
5	170	Tye Smith	CB	Towson
6	209	Obum Gwacham	DE	Oregon State
6	214	Kristjan Sokoli	G	Buffalo
7	248	Ryan Murphy	CB	Oregon State

Compensatory selection

Draft trades

- The Seahawks traded their first-round selection (No. 31 overall) and center Max Unger to the New Orleans Saints in exchange for the Saints' fourth-round selection (No. 112 overall) and tight end Jimmy Graham.
- The Seahawks acquired an additional sixth-round selection (No. 181 overall) in a trade that sent wide receiver Percy Harvin to the Jets.
- The Seahawks traded their original sixth-round selection (No. 207 overall) to the Indianapolis Colts in exchange for cornerback Marcus Burley.
- The Seahawks traded their third-round selection (No. 95 overall), fourth-round selection acquired from the Saints (No. 112 overall), fifth-round selection (No. 167 overall), and sixth-round selection acquired from the Jets (No. 181 overall) for the Washington Redskins' third-round selection (No. 69 overall), used to draft wide receiver Tyler Lockett.

== Personnel ==
=== Staff / Coaches ===
2015 Seattle Seahawks staff
**Front office**: Chairman – Paul Allen; President – Peter McLoughlin; Executive vice president/general manager – John Schneider; Senior vice president of football administration – Matt Thomas; Director of team operations – Tag Ribary; Director of college scouting – Matt Berry; Co-director of player personnel – Scott Fitterer; Co-director of player personnel – Trent Kirchner; Director of pro personnel – Dan Morgan; Director of football communications – Lane Gammel; Senior personnel executive – Ed Dodds; **Head coaches**: Head coach/executive vice president of football operations – Pete Carroll; Assistant head coach/offensive line – Tom Cable; Assistant head coach/defense – Rocky Seto; **Offensive coaches**: Offensive coordinator – Darrell Bevell; Quarterbacks – Carl Smith; Running backs – Sherman Smith; Wide receivers – Dave Canales; Assistant wide receivers – Nate Carroll; Tight ends – Pat McPherson; Assistant offensive line – Pat Ruel; Assistant offensive line – Brennan Carroll; Offensive assistant – Will Harriger	**Defensive coaches**: Defensive coordinator – Kris Richard; Defensive line – Travis Jones; Assistant defensive line – Dwaine Board; Linebackers – Micheal Barrow; Assistant linebackers – Lofa Tatupu; Assistant Secondary (Cornerbacks) – Chris Cash; Assistant Secondary (Safeties) – Andre Curtis; Defensive assistant – John Glenn; **Special teams coaches**: Special teams coordinator – Brian Schneider; Assistant special teams – Chad Morton; Assistant special teams – Nick Sorensen; **Strength and conditioning**: Head strength and conditioning – Chris Carlisle; Assistant strength and conditioning – Mondray Gee; Assistant strength and conditioning – Jamie Yancher

=== Final roster ===
2015 Seattle Seahawks roster
**Quarterbacks (QB)**: 7 Tarvaris Jackson; **3** Russell Wilson; **Running backs (RB)**: 36 Bryce Brown; 40 Derrick Coleman FB; 22 Fred Jackson; **24** Marshawn Lynch; 32 Christine Michael; 46 Will Tukuafu FB; **Wide receivers (WR)**: **89** Doug Baldwin; **15** Jermaine Kearse; **16** Tyler Lockett; 17 Kevin Smith; 18 Kasen Williams; **Tight ends (TE)**: 86 Chase Coffman; 84 Cooper Helfet; 82 Luke Willson	**Offensive linemen (OL)**: 78 Alvin Bailey T; **68** Justin Britt G; **79** Garry Gilliam T; 63 Mark Glowinski G; 61 Lemuel Jeanpierre C; **65** Patrick Lewis C; **76** Russell Okung T; 67 Kristjan Sokoli G; **64** J. R. Sweezy G; **Defensive linemen (DL)**: **56** Cliff Avril DE; **72** Michael Bennett DE; 55 Frank Clark DE; 95 Demarcus Dobbs DE; 99 A. J. Francis DT; 97 Jordan Hill DT; 91 Cassius Marsh DE; **92** Brandon Mebane DT; **77** Ahtyba Rubin DT	**Linebackers (LB)**: 52 Brock Coyle MLB; **51** Bruce Irvin OLB; 57 Mike Morgan OLB; 58 Kevin Pierre-Louis OLB; 47 Eric Pinkins OLB; **54** Bobby Wagner MLB; **50** K. J. Wright OLB; **Defensive backs (DB)**: 28 Marcus Burley CB; **31** Kam Chancellor SS; 20 Jeremy Lane CB; 33 Kelcie McCray SS; **35** DeShawn Shead CB; **25** Richard Sherman CB; 21 Tye Smith CB; 23 Steven Terrell FS; **29** Earl Thomas FS; **Special teams (ST)**: 49 Clint Gresham LS; 4 Stephen Hauschka K; 9 Jon Ryan P	**Practice squad**: 42 Brandon Cottom FB; 41 George Farmer CB; 1 Deshon Foxx WR; 14 Antwan Goodley WR; 98 Justin Hamilton DT; 30 Stanley Jean-Baptiste CB; 19 Douglas McNeil WR; 62 Drew Nowak C; 75 Will Pericak G; 69 Terry Poole T (PS/I); 37 Trovon Reed CB; **Reserve**: **88** Jimmy Graham TE (IR); 83 Ricardo Lockette WR (IR); 85 Anthony McCoy TE (IR); 53 Nick Moody MLB (IR); 34 Thomas Rawls RB (IR); 10 Paul Richardson WR (IR); 44 Ryan Robinson DE (IR); 53 Kona Schwenke T (IR); 39 Mohammed Seisay CB (IR); 27 Tharold Simon CB (IR); 90 Jesse Williams DT (NF-Inj.); Rookies in italics 53 active, 12 reserve, 10 practice squad

- Starters in bold.
- (*) Denotes players that were selected for the 2016 Pro Bowl.

== Schedule ==
=== Preseason ===
Week	Date	Opponent	Result	Record	Venue	Recap
1	August 14	Denver Broncos	**L** 20–22	0–1	CenturyLink Field	Recap
2	August 21	at Kansas City Chiefs	**L** 13–14	0–2	Arrowhead Stadium	Recap
3	August 29	at San Diego Chargers	**W** 16–15	1–2	Qualcomm Stadium	Recap
4	September 3	Oakland Raiders	**W** 31–21	2–2	CenturyLink Field	Recap

=== Regular season ===
Divisional matchups: the NFC West played the NFC North and the AFC North.

Week	Date	Opponent	Result	Record	Venue	Recap
1	September 13	at **St. Louis Rams**	**L** 31–34 (OT)	0–1	Edward Jones Dome	Recap
2	September 20	at Green Bay Packers	**L** 17–27	0–2	Lambeau Field	Recap
3	September 27	Chicago Bears	**W** 26–0	1–2	CenturyLink Field	Recap
4	October 5	Detroit Lions	**W** 13–10	2–2	CenturyLink Field	Recap
5	October 11	at Cincinnati Bengals	**L** 24–27 (OT)	2–3	Paul Brown Stadium	Recap
6	October 18	Carolina Panthers	**L** 23–27	2–4	CenturyLink Field	Recap
7	October 22	at **San Francisco 49ers**	**W** 20–3	3–4	Levi's Stadium	Recap
8	November 1	at Dallas Cowboys	**W** 13–12	4–4	AT&T Stadium	Recap
9	Bye					
10	November 15	**Arizona Cardinals**	**L** 32–39	4–5	CenturyLink Field	Recap
11	November 22	**San Francisco 49ers**	**W** 29–13	5–5	CenturyLink Field	Recap
12	November 29	Pittsburgh Steelers	**W** 39–30	6–5	CenturyLink Field	Recap
13	December 6	at Minnesota Vikings	**W** 38–7	7–5	TCF Bank Stadium	Recap
14	December 13	at Baltimore Ravens	**W** 35–6	8–5	M&T Bank Stadium	Recap
15	December 20	Cleveland Browns	**W** 30–13	9–5	CenturyLink Field	Recap
16	December 27	**St. Louis Rams**	**L** 17–23	9–6	CenturyLink Field	Recap
17	January 3, 2016	at **Arizona Cardinals**	**W** 36–6	10–6	University of Phoenix Stadium	Recap

Note: Intra-division opponents are in bold text.

=== Postseason ===
Round	Date	Opponent (seed)	Result	Record	Venue	Recap
Wild Card	January 10, 2016	at Minnesota Vikings (3)	**W** 10–9	1–0	TCF Bank Stadium	Recap
Divisional	January 17, 2016	at Carolina Panthers (1)	**L** 24–31	1–1	Bank of America Stadium	Recap

== Game summaries ==
=== Regular season ===
==== Week 1: at St. Louis Rams ====
Week One: Seattle Seahawks at St. Louis Rams – Game summary

Quarter	1	2	3	4	OT	Total
Seahawks	7	3	3	18	0	31
Rams	0	10	14	7	3	34

at Edward Jones Dome, St. Louis, Missouri

- Date: September 13
- Game time: 12:00 p.m. CDT/10:00 a.m. PDT
- Game weather: Played indoors (dome stadium)
- Game attendance: 51,792
- Referee: Jeff Triplette
- TV announcers (Fox): Kenny Albert, Daryl Johnston and Laura Okmin
- Recap, Gamebook

Game information

First quarter

- SEA – Tyler Lockett 57-yard punt return (Steven Hauschka kick), 4:31
  (SEA 7–0)

Second quarter

- STL – Tavon Austin 16-yard run (Greg Zuerlein kick), 14:55 (Tied 7–7)
- STL – Greg Zuerlein 33-yard field goal, 7:31 (STL 10-7)
- SEA – Steven Hauschka 25-yard field goal, 0:00 (Tied 10–10)

Third quarter

- SEA – Steven Hauschka 27-yard field goal, 9:40 (SEA 13–10)
- STL – Nick Foles 1-yard run (Greg Zuerlein kick), 6:10 (STL 17–13)
- STL – Tavon Austin 75-yard punt return (Greg Zuerlein kick), 4:30 (STL 24–13)

Fourth quarter

- SEA – Jimmy Graham 7-yard pass from Russell Wilson (2-pt PAT: Marshawn Lynch run), 12:04 (STL 24–21)
- SEA – Steven Hauschka 35-yard field goal, 4:46 (Tied 24–24)
- SEA – Cary Williams 8-yard fumble return (Steven Hauschka kick), 4:39 (SEA 31–24)
- STL – Lance Kendricks 37-yard pass from Nick Foles (Greg Zuerlein kick), 0:53 (Tied 31–31)

Overtime

- STL – Greg Zuerlein 37-yard field goal, 12:06 (STL 34–31)

Top passers

- SEA – Russell Wilson: 32/41, 251 yds, 1 TD, 1 INT
- STL – Nick Foles: 18/27, 297 yds, 1 TD

Top rushers

- SEA – Marshawn Lynch: 18 car, 73 yds
- STL – Benny Cunningham: 16 car, 45 yds

Top receivers

- SEA – Jermaine Kearse: 8 rec, 76 yds
- STL – Jared Cook: 5 rec, 85 yds

Top tacklers

- SEA – Earl Thomas: 6 solo, 3 asst, ff
- STL – Lamarcus Joyner: 7 solo, sack

Team – pass – rush – total – to

- SEA – 219 – 124 – 343 – 1
- STL – 276 – 76 – 352 – 3

The Seahawks opened the season in St. Louis to take on the Rams. In the first quarter, rookie Tyler Lockett returned a punt for 57 yards for a touchdown to give the Seahawks the game's first points. Jimmy Graham made his Seahawks debut, catching a pass for 7 yards for a touchdown, as the Seahawks were now trailing the Rams, 24–21, in the 3rd quarter. However, without safety Kam Chancellor, Seattle's defense struggled all game. The loss of their defensive captain was too steep to overcome as they would go on to lose in overtime, 34–31, after Greg Zuerlein hit a 37-yard field goal with 12:06 remaining.

With the loss, the Seahawks dropped to 0–1.

==== Week 2: at Green Bay Packers ====
Week Two: Seattle Seahawks at Green Bay Packers – Game summary

Quarter	1	2	3	4	Total
Seahawks	3	0	14	0	17
Packers	10	3	3	11	27

at Lambeau Field, Green Bay, Wisconsin

- Date: September 20
- Game time: 7:30 p.m. CDT/5:30 p.m. PDT
- Game weather: 62 °F (17 °C), clear
- Game attendance: 78,433
- Referee: Gene Steratore
- TV announcers (NBC): Al Michaels, Cris Collinsworth and Michele Tafoya
- Recap, Gamebook

Game information

First quarter

- GB – James Jones 29-yard pass from Aaron Rodgers (Mason Crosby kick), 10:45 (GB 7–0)
- GB – Mason Crosby 54-yard field goal, 6:52 (GB 10-0)
- SEA – Steven Hauschka 54-yard field goal, 3:13 (GB 10–3)

Second quarter

- GB – Mason Crosby 18-yard field goal, 0:02 (GB 13-3)

Third quarter

- SEA – Fred Jackson 5-yard pass from Russell Wilson (Steven Hauschka kick), 9:57 (GB 13–10)
- SEA – Doug Baldwin 13-yard pass from Russell Wilson (Steven Hauschka kick), 6:48 (SEA 17–13)
- GB – Mason Crosby 44-yard field goal, 3:12 (SEA 17–16)

Fourth quarter

- GB – Richard Rodgers 5-yard pass from Aaron Rodgers, (2-pt PAT: Richard Rodgers pass from Aaron Rodgers), 9:28 (GB 24–17)
- GB – Mason Crosby 21-yard field goal, 1:56 (GB 27–17)

Top passers

- SEA – Russell Wilson: 19/30, 206 yds, 2 TD, 1 INT
- GB – Aaron Rodgers: 25/33, 249 yds, 2 TD

Top rushers

- SEA – Russell Wilson: 10 car, 78 yds
- GB – James Starks: 20 car, 95 yds

Top receivers

- SEA – Doug Baldwin: 7 rec, 92 yds, 1 TD
- GB – Randall Cobb: 8 rec, 116 yds

Top tacklers

- SEA – Bobby Wagner: 6 solo, 6 asst, pd
- GB – Ha Ha Clinton-Dix: 7 solo, 2 asst

Team – pass – rush – total – to

- SEA – 205 – 119 – 324 – 2
- GB – 234 – 127 – 361 – 1

After a tough opening loss to the St. Louis Rams, the Seahawks traveled to Green Bay to take on the Packers. The Packers struck first blood, scoring the game's first 10 points. Then, the Seahawks and Packers traded field goals, and the Packers led 13–3 at halftime. The Seahawks scored two unanswered touchdowns to take a 17–13 lead in the third quarter. However, the Packers proceeded to score the final 14 points of the game and won, 27–17, sending the Seahawks to their second consecutive loss of the young season.

With the loss, the Seahawks dropped to 0–2. It was the first double digit loss for the Seahawks in the Wilson era and tied their largest loss since Week 9 of the 2011 season, when they lost by 10 points to the Dallas Cowboys.

==== Week 3: vs. Chicago Bears ====
Week Three: Chicago Bears at Seattle Seahawks – Game summary

Quarter	1	2	3	4	Total
Bears	0	0	0	0	0
Seahawks	3	3	14	6	26

at CenturyLink Field, Seattle, Washington

- Date: September 27
- Game time: 1:25 p.m. PDT
- Game weather: 60 °F (16 °C), sunny
- Game attendance: 69,002
- Referee: Carl Cheffers
- TV announcers (CBS): Jim Nantz, Phil Simms and Tracy Wolfson
- Recap, Gamebook

Game information

First quarter

- SEA – Steven Hauschka 31-yard field goal, 5:16 (SEA 3–0)

Second quarter

- SEA – Steven Hauschka 21-yard field goal, 0:00 (SEA 6–0)

Third quarter

- SEA – Tyler Lockett 105-yard kickoff return (Steven Hauschka kick), 14:48 (SEA 13–0)
- SEA – Jimmy Graham 30-yard pass from Russell Wilson (Steven Hauschka kick), 4:28 (SEA 20–0)

Fourth quarter

- SEA – Steven Hauschka 45-yard field goal, 14:03 (SEA 23–0)
- SEA – Steven Hauschka 48-yard field goal, 6:16 (SEA 26–0)

Top passers

- CHI – Jimmy Clausen: 9/17, 63 yds
- SEA – Russell Wilson: 20/30, 235 yds, 1 TD

Top rushers

- CHI – Matt Forte: 20 car, 74 yds
- SEA – Thomas Rawls: 16 car, 104 yds

Top receivers

- CHI – Martellus Bennett: 4 rec, 15 yds
- SEA – Jimmy Graham: 7 rec, 83 yds, 1 TD

Top tacklers

- CHI – Antrel Rolle: 7 solo, 3 asst
- SEA – K. J. Wright: 5 solo, 5 asst

Team – pass – rush – total – to

- CHI – 48 – 98 – 146 – 0
- SEA – 212 – 159 – 371 – 0

After playing (and losing) their first two games of the season on the road, the Seahawks went home to face the winless Chicago Bears, hoping to avoid an 0–3 start. The game saw the return of Kam Chancellor after his holdout. Marshawn Lynch, for the most part, was not a factor, and he finished with just five carries. He left the game with a pulled hamstring. The Seahawks got a boost from their special teams. Tyler Lockett returned the second half kickoff 105 yards for a touchdown to give Seattle a 13–0 lead. Also, Richard Sherman was used as a punt returner and returned it for 67 yards. In the end, the Seahawks dominated the Bears, 26–0, thereby avoiding an 0–3 start.

With the win, the Seahawks earned their first win of the season and improved to 1–2.

==== Week 4: vs. Detroit Lions ====
Week Four: Detroit Lions at Seattle Seahawks – Game summary

Quarter	1	2	3	4	Total
Lions	0	3	0	7	10
Seahawks	0	10	3	0	13

at CenturyLink Field, Seattle, Washington

- Date: October 5
- Game time: 5:30 p.m. PDT
- Game weather: 74 °F (23 °C), sunny
- Game attendance: 69,005
- Referee: Tony Corrente
- TV announcers (ESPN): Mike Tirico, Jon Gruden and Lisa Salters
- Recap, Gamebook

Game information

First quarter

- No scoring plays

Second quarter

- SEA – Doug Baldwin 13-yard pass from Russell Wilson (Steven Hauschka kick), 10:56 (SEA 7–0)
- DET – Matt Prater 41-yard field goal, 5:16 (SEA 7-3)
- SEA – Steven Hauschka 51-yard field goal, 1:00 (SEA 10-3)

Third quarter

- SEA – Steven Hauschka 52-yard field goal, 11:11 (SEA 13-3)

Fourth quarter

- DET – Caraun Reid 27-yard fumble return (Matt Prater kick), 8:32 (SEA 13–10)

Top passers

- DET – Matthew Stafford: 24/35, 203 yds
- SEA – Russell Wilson: 20/26, 287 yds, 1 TD

Top rushers

- DET – Ameer Abdullah: 13 car, 33 yds
- SEA – Thomas Rawls: 17 car, 48 yds

Top receivers

- DET – Calvin Johnson: 7 rec, 56 yds
- SEA – Jermaine Kearse: 2 rec, 84 yds

Top tacklers

- DET – James Ihedigbo: 7 solo, 1 asst, sack, ff
- SEA – Bobby Wagner: 4 solo, 4 asst

Team – pass – rush – total – to

- DET – 203 – 53 – 256 – 1
- SEA – 235 – 110 – 345 – 3

After easily defeating the Bears, the Seahawks remained at home to face the winless Detroit Lions. The Seahawks led 13–3 heading into the 4th quarter. Wilson was sacked and fumbled, and the Lions defense ran it back for a touchdown, cutting the deficit to 13–10. After the Seahawks' offense had a 3 and out, the Lions had the ball at their 10-yard line. They reached the red zone a few minutes later. On 3rd and 1, Stafford completed a pass to Calvin Johnson, who reached the Seahawks' 1 yard line and attempted to reach out and score the go ahead touchdown. As Johnson was brought down, Kam Chancellor stripped the ball from him. K.J. Wright then knocked the ball out of the back of the end zone. The referees ruled it a touchback, giving the Seahawks the ball back on their 20-yard line. The Seahawks ran two plays, forcing the Lions to burn their timeouts. On 3rd and 2, Wilson completed a pass to Kearse, gaining the first down. With no timeouts remaining, the Seahawks kneeled, ran out the clock, and ended the game, winning 13–10. As a result, the Lions dropped to 0–4. Wright's bat play caused controversy afterwards. Minutes after the game ended, the NFL VP of officiating ruled that Wright illegally batted the ball out of the back of endzone. Had the call been made, a penalty would have been assessed that gave the Lions a 1st down at the spot of the fumble, plus half the distance to the goal (6–inch line). The officiating crew was heavily criticized by analysts, fans, and players following the missed call. Several comparisons were immediately made to the Seahawks' controversial victory over the Green Bay Packers in Week 3 of the 2012 season, which also happened on Monday Night Football. In the postgame press conference, Carroll admitted that Wright intentionally batted the ball out of the back of the endzone, and Wright confirmed it. Chancellor said that he did not see the controversial play.

The Seahawks improved to 2–2.

==== Week 5: at Cincinnati Bengals ====
Week Five: Seattle Seahawks at Cincinnati Bengals – Game summary

Quarter	1	2	3	4	OT	Total
Seahawks	7	3	14	0	0	24
Bengals	7	0	0	17	3	27

at Paul Brown Stadium, Cincinnati, Ohio

- Date: October 11
- Game time: 1:00 p.m. EDT/10:00 a.m. PDT
- Game weather: 66 °F (19 °C), sunny
- Game attendance: 65,004
- Referee: John Parry
- TV announcers (Fox): Joe Buck, Troy Aikman and Erin Andrews
- Recap, Gamebook

Game information

First quarter

- CIN – Tyler Eifert 44-yard pass from Andy Dalton (Mike Nugent kick), 12:00 (CIN 7–0)
- SEA – Jermaine Kearse 30-yard pass from Russell Wilson (Steven Hauschka kick), 6:39 (Tied 7–7)

Second quarter

- SEA – Steven Hauschka 24-yard field goal, 0:02 (SEA 10–7)

Third quarter

- SEA – Thomas Rawls 69-yard run (Steven Hauschka kick), 8:51 (SEA 17–7)
- SEA – Bobby Wagner 23-yard fumble return (Steven Hauschka kick), 6:47 (SEA 24–7)

Fourth quarter

- CIN – Tyler Eifert 10-yard pass from Andy Dalton (Mike Nugent kick), 12:13 (SEA 24–14)
- CIN – Andy Dalton 5-yard run (Mike Nugent kick), 3:41 (SEA 24–21)
- CIN – Mike Nugent 31-yard field goal, 0:03 (Tied 24–24)

Overtime

- CIN – Mike Nugent 42-yard field goal, 3:42 (CIN 27–24)

Top passers

- SEA – Russell Wilson: 15/23, 213 yds, 1 TD, 1 INT
- CIN – Andy Dalton: 30/44, 331 yds, 2 TD, 1 INT

Top rushers

- SEA – Thomas Rawls: 23 car, 169 yds, 1 TD
- CIN – Giovani Bernard: 15 car, 80 yds

Top receivers

- SEA – Doug Baldwin: 3 rec, 70 yds
- CIN – Tyler Eifert: 8 rec, 90 yds, 2 TD

Top tacklers

- SEA – Kam Chancellor: 8 solo, 1 asst
- CIN – Vincent Rey: 6 solo, 7 asst

Team – pass – rush – total – to

- SEA – 197 – 200 – 397 – 1
- CIN – 310 – 109 – 419 – 2

After defeating the Bears and Lions (both winless teams) at home to get to .500, the Seahawks traveled to Cincinnati to take on the 4–0 Bengals. In the 3rd quarter, a 23-yard fumble returned for a touchdown by Bobby Wagner allowed the Seahawks to take a commanding 24–7 lead. The Seahawks, however, allowed the Bengals to score the final 20 points of the game, capped by Bengals kicker Mike Nugent kicking the game-winning field goal in overtime. It's the first time since 2004 that the Seahawks blew a 17–point lead. During that stretch, they were 71–0 when holding a 17–point lead.

With the loss, the Seahawks dropped to 2–3. Additionally, they dropped to 0–2 in overtime games (losing both by game–winning field goals).

==== Week 6: vs. Carolina Panthers ====
Week Six: Carolina Panthers at Seattle Seahawks – Game summary

Quarter	1	2	3	4	Total
Panthers	0	7	7	13	27
Seahawks	3	7	10	3	23

at CenturyLink Field, Seattle, Washington

- Date: October 18
- Game time: 1:05 p.m. PDT
- Game weather: 61 °F (16 °C), cloudy
- Game attendance: 69,020
- Referee: Terry McAulay
- TV announcers (Fox): Sam Rosen, John Lynch and Pam Oliver
- Recap, Gamebook

Game information

First quarter

- SEA – Steven Hauschka 30-yard field goal, 5:41 (SEA 3-0)

Second quarter

- CAR – Cam Newton 2-yard run (Graham Gano kick), 13:34 (CAR 7-3)
- SEA – Marshawn Lynch 1-yard run (Steven Hauschka kick), 8:02 (SEA 10-7)

Third quarter

- SEA – Ricardo Lockette 40-yard pass from Russell Wilson (Steven Hauschka kick), 11:36 (SEA 17-7)
- SEA – Steven Hauschka 50-yard field goal, 8:54 (SEA 20-7)
- CAR – Jonathan Stewart 1-yard run (Graham Gano kick), 3:39 (SEA 20-14)

Fourth quarter

- SEA – Steven Hauschka 43-yard field goal, 11:51 (SEA 23-14)
- CAR – Jonathan Stewart 1-yard run (kick is no good), 3:58 (SEA 23-20)
- CAR – Greg Olsen 26-yard pass from Cam Newton (Graham Gano kick), :36 (CAR 27-23)

Top passers

- CAR – Cam Newton: 20/36, 269 yds, 1 TD, 2 INT
- SEA – Russell Wilson: 18/30, 241 yds, 1 TD

Top rushers

- CAR – Jonathan Stewart: 20 car, 78 yds, 2 TD
- SEA – Marshawn Lynch: 17 car, 54 yds, 1 TD

Top receivers

- CAR – Greg Olsen: 7 rec, 131 yds, 1 TD
- SEA – Jimmy Graham: 8 rec, 140 yds

Top tacklers

- CAR – Luke Kuechly: 5 solo, 9 asst
- SEA – Kam Chancellor: 6 solo, 4 asst

Team – pass – rush – total – to

- CAR – 248 – 135 – 383 – 2
- SEA – 219 – 115 – 334 – 0

After losing a heartbreaker in Cincinnati to the Bengals, the Seahawks returned home to face their second undefeated team in a row, the 4–0 Carolina Panthers. With 11:51 remaining in the 4th quarter, the Seahawks led the Panthers, 23–14. However, for the fourth time this season, the Seahawks failed to win while holding a 4th quarter lead. The Panthers went on to score the final 13 points of the game, winning 27–23. The Seahawks lost only their third home game since the team drafted Wilson (28–3 home record), having lost to the Cardinals in Week 16 of the 2013 season and the Cowboys in Week 6 of the 2014 season.

With the loss, the Seahawks dropped to 2–4.

Up to this point, they were in 3rd place in the NFC West (due to tiebreakers).

==== Week 7: at San Francisco 49ers ====
Week Seven: Seattle Seahawks at San Francisco 49ers – Game summary

Quarter	1	2	3	4	Total
Seahawks	7	10	0	3	20
49ers	0	0	3	0	3

at Levi's Stadium, Santa Clara, California

- Date: October 22
- Game time: 5:25 p.m. PDT
- Game weather: 75 °F (24 °C), mostly sunny
- Game attendance: 70,799
- Referee: Walt Anderson
- TV announcers (CBS/NFLN): Jim Nantz, Phil Simms and Tracy Wolfson
- Recap, Gamebook

Game information

First quarter

- SEA – Marshawn Lynch 1-yard run (Steven Hauschka kick), 7:01 (SEA 7–0)

Second quarter

- SEA – Steven Hauschka 49-yard field goal, 9:37 (SEA 10–0)
- SEA – Tyler Lockett 43-yard pass from Russell Wilson (Steven Hauschka kick), 2:44 (SEA 17–0)

Third quarter

- SF – Phil Dawson 35-yard field goal, 1:21 (SEA 17–3)

Fourth quarter

- SEA – Steven Hauschka 46-yard field goal, 9:23 (SEA 20–3)

Top passers

- SEA – Russell Wilson: 18/24, 235 yds, 1 TD, 2 INT
- SF – Colin Kaepernick: 13/24, 124 yds

Top rushers

- SEA – Marshawn Lynch: 27 car, 122 yds, 1 TD
- SF – Carlos Hyde: 11 car, 40 yds

Top receivers

- SEA – Tyler Lockett: 5 rec, 79 yds, 1 TD
- SF – Vernon Davis: 4 rec, 61 yds

Top tacklers

- SEA – Bobby Wagner: 5 solo
- SF – Michael Wilhoite: 9 solo, 4 asst

Team – pass – rush – total – to

- SEA – 212 – 176 – 388 – 2
- SF – 81 – 61 – 142 – 0

After blowing four 4th quarter leads and only winning against two teams with losing records, the Seahawks traveled to Santa Clara to take on the 49ers. The Seahawks easily defeated their former arch-rivals, 20–3. Seahawks running back Marshawn Lynch compiled 122 rushing yards and 1 rushing touchdown on 27 carries. 49ers quarterback Colin Kaepernick struggled once again against the vaunted Legion of Boom, going 13-24 with 124 passing yards, 0 passing touchdowns, and 0 interceptions. Seahawks quarterback Russell Wilson was efficient again, completing 18 passes out of 24 attempts for 235 passing yards with 1 passing touchdown and 2 interceptions.

With the win, the Seahawks improved to 3–4. Additionally, Wilson improved to 6–2 against the 49ers (including postseason), extending his winning streak against them to four games.

==== Week 8: at Dallas Cowboys ====
Week Eight: Seattle Seahawks at Dallas Cowboys – Game summary

Quarter	1	2	3	4	Total
Seahawks	3	7	0	3	13
Cowboys	3	3	3	3	12

at AT&T Stadium, Arlington, Texas

- Date: November 1
- Game time: 3:25 p.m. CST/1:25 p.m. PST
- Game weather: Played indoors (retractable roof closed)
- Game attendance: 91,486
- Referee: Carl Cheffers
- TV announcers (Fox): Thom Brennaman, Troy Aikman and Peter Schrager
- Recap, Gamebook

Game information

First quarter

- SEA – Steven Hauschka 26-yard field goal, 8:51. Seahawks 3–0. Drive: 12 plays, 72 yards, 6:13.
- DAL – Dan Bailey 33-yard field goal, 0:48. Tied 3–3. Drive: 15 plays, 65 yards, 8:04.

Second quarter

- SEA – Luke Willson 22-yard pass from Russell Wilson (Steven Hauschka kick), 5:33. Seahawks 10–3. Drive: 7 plays, 65 yards, 3:38.
- DAL – Dan Bailey 35-yard field goal, 1:38. Seahawks 10–6. Drive: 10 plays, 63 yards, 3:55.

Third quarter

- DAL – Dan Bailey 52-yard field goal, 8:56. Seahawks 10–9. Drive: 12 plays, 46 yards, 6:09.

Fourth quarter

- DAL – Dan Bailey 27-yard field goal, 14:32. Cowboys 12-10. Drive: 4 plays, 7 yards, 0:48.
- SEA – Steven Hauschka 24-yard field goal, 1:10. Seahawks 13–12. Drive: 17 plays, 79 yards, 5:35.

Top passers

- SEA – Russell Wilson – 19/30, 210 yards, TD, INT
- DAL – Matt Cassel – 13/25, 97 yards

Top rushers

- SEA – Marshawn Lynch – 21 rushes, 71 yards
- DAL – Darren McFadden – 20 rushes, 64 yards

Top receivers

- SEA – Jimmy Graham – 7 receptions, 75 yards
- DAL – Darren McFadden – 6 receptions, 49 yards

Top tacklers

- SEA – K. J. Wright - 6 tackles, 3 assists
- DAL – Sean Lee - 5 tackles, 6 assists

Team – pass – rush – total – to

- SEA – 210 – 113 – 323 – 1
- DAL – 91 – 129 – 220 – 0

After dominating the 49ers in California, the Seahawks traveled to Dallas to take on the Cowboys. Seattle's only touchdown was a 22-yard pass from Russell Wilson to Luke Willson to give Seattle a 10–3 lead. Late in the second quarter, Ricardo Lockette left the game with an apparent injury after taking a brutal hit by Jeff Heath. Steven Hauschka hit the game-winning field goal for the 13–12 Seahawks' victory.

A day later, the Seahawks announced that Ricardo Lockette underwent season-ending neck surgery and miss the rest of the season. This injury proved to be career-ending.

With the win, the Seahawks improved to 4–4.

At this point, all of their wins have come against teams with losing records.

==== Week 9: Bye week ====
No game. Seattle had a bye week.

==== Week 10: vs. Arizona Cardinals ====
Week Ten: Arizona Cardinals at Seattle Seahawks – Game summary

Quarter	1	2	3	4	Total
Cardinals	0	22	3	14	39
Seahawks	0	7	10	15	32

at CenturyLink Field, Seattle, Washington

- Date: November 15
- Game time: 5:30 p.m. PST
- Game weather: 49 °F (9 °C), partly cloudy
- Game attendance: 69,005
- Referee: Clete Blakeman
- TV announcers (NBC): Al Michaels, Cris Collinsworth and Michele Tafoya
- Recap, Gamebook

Game information

First quarter

- No scoring plays

Second quarter

- ARI – Chandler Catanzaro 33-yard field goal, 12:52 (ARI 3–0)
- ARI – Russell Wilson tackled by Frostee Rucker in end zone for Safety, 12:14 (ARI 5–0)
- ARI – Michael Floyd 27-yard pass from Carson Palmer (Chandler Catanzaro kick), 6:41 (ARI 12–0)
- ARI – Michael Floyd 35-yard pass from Carson Palmer (Chandler Catanzaro kick), 4:02 (ARI 19–0)
- SEA – Will Tukuafu 1-yard run (Steven Hauschka kick), 1:52 (ARI 19–7)
- ARI – Chandler Catanzaro 43-yard field goal, 0:00 (ARI 22–7)

Third quarter

- SEA – Steven Hauschka 31-yard field goal, 11:18 (ARI 22–10)
- ARI – Chandler Catanzaro 43-yard field goal, 6:29 (ARI 25–10)
- SEA – Doug Baldwin 32-yard pass from Russell Wilson (Steven Hauschka kick), 4:52 (ARI 25–17)

Fourth quarter

- SEA – Marshawn Lynch 3-yard run (PAT failed), 14:44 (ARI 25–23)
- SEA – Bobby Wagner 22-yard fumble return (PAT failed), 13:00 (SEA 29–25)
- ARI – Jermaine Gresham 14-yard pass from Carson Palmer (Chandler Catanzaro kick), 8:41 (ARI 32–29)
- ARI – Andre Ellington 48-yard run (Chandler Catanzaro kick), 1:58 (ARI 39–29)
- SEA – Steven Hauschka 46-yard field goal, 0:58 (ARI 39–32)

Top passers

- ARI – Carson Palmer: 29/48, 363 yds, 3 TD, 1 INT
- SEA – Russell Wilson: 14/32, 240 yds, 1 TD, 1 INT

Top rushers

- ARI – Chris Johnson: 25 car, 48 yds
- SEA – Marshawn Lynch: 8 car, 42 yds, 1 TD

Top receivers

- ARI – Larry Fitzgerald: 10 rec, 130 yds
- SEA – Doug Baldwin: 7 rec, 134 yds, 1 TD

Top tacklers

- ARI – Deone Bucannon: 4 solo, 3 asst, 1 sack
- SEA – Kam Chancellor: 5 solo, 12 asst

Team – pass – rush – total – to

- ARI – 334 – 117 – 451 – 3
- SEA – 228 – 115 – 343 – 1

After the bye week, the Seahawks hosted the Arizona Cardinals in their second Sunday Night Football game of the season.

Late in the first quarter, Earl Thomas intercepted Carson Palmer in the end zone as Palmer attempted to give Arizona the game's first points. This was Thomas' third interception of the season.

Early in the second quarter, Russell Wilson recovered a fumble to give the Cardinals a safety after the ball bounced to the back of the end zone and Wilson being able to recover it after a bad snap. Trailing 19–0 late in the second quarter, the Seahawks turned to fullback Will Tukuafu to give Seattle the first touchdown of the game. This was Tukuafu's first NFL touchdown.

The Seahawks defense struggled to stop the Cardinals offense all game, especially the running game in the fourth quarter. The Seahawks defense allowed 39 total points. It was the most points they allowed in a game since November 28, 2010 against the Kansas City Chiefs.

This was the first time that the Seahawks lost two home games in a season in the Wilson era. Over the previous three seasons, the Seahawks had not lost more than one home game in each season.

With the loss, the Seahawks dropped to 4–5. This marked the fifth time this season that the Seahawks could not hold on to a 4th quarter lead.

==== Week 11: vs. San Francisco 49ers ====
Week Eleven: San Francisco 49ers at Seattle Seahawks – Game summary

Quarter	1	2	3	4	Total
49ers	0	7	6	0	13
Seahawks	13	7	3	6	29

at CenturyLink Field, Seattle, Washington

- Date: November 22
- Game time: 1:25 p.m. PST
- Game weather: 46 °F (8 °C), sunny
- Game attendance: 68,993
- Referee: Ed Hochuli
- TV announcers (Fox): Chris Myers, Ronde Barber and Jennifer Hale
- Recap, Gamebook

Game information

First quarter

- SEA – Tyler Lockett 24-yard pass from Russell Wilson (Steven Hauschka kick), 9:55 (SEA 7–0)
- SEA – Thomas Rawls 2-yard run (Steven Hauschka kick is no good), 3:04 (SEA 13–0)

Second quarter

- SEA – Tyler Lockett 11-yard pass from Russell Wilson (Steven Hauschka kick), 7:15 (SEA 20–0)
- SF – Vance McDonald 19-yard pass from Blaine Gabbert (Phil Dawson kick), 0:09 (SEA 20–7)

Third quarter

- SF – Phil Dawson 26-yard field goal, 9:44 (SEA 20–10)
- SEA – Steven Hauschka 26-yard field goal, 5:01 (SEA 23–10)
- SF – Phil Dawson 26-yard field goal, 0:07 (SEA 23–13)

Fourth quarter

- SEA – Thomas Rawls 31-yard pass from Russell Wilson (Steven Hauschka kick blocked), 12:32 (SEA 29–13)

Top passers

- SF – Blaine Gabbert: 22/34, 264 yds, 1 TD
- SEA – Russell Wilson: 24/29, 260 yds, 3 TD

Top rushers

- SF – Shaun Draughn: 12 car, 37 yds
- SEA – Thomas Rawls: 30 car, 209 yds, 1 TD

Top receivers

- SF – Shaun Draughn: 8 rec, 40 yds
- SEA – Doug Baldwin: 6 rec, 60 yds

Top tacklers

- SF – Eric Reid: 6 solo, 4 asst
- SEA – Bobby Wagner: 3 solo, 5 asst, pd

Team – pass – rush – total – to

- SF – 247 – 59 – 306 – 0
- SEA – 253 – 255 – 508 – 0

After blowing yet another 4th quarter lead, the Seahawks hosted the San Francisco 49ers. Blaine Gabbert was now the 49ers' starting quarterback, replacing Colin Kaepernick, who was placed on IR. Although Marshawn Lynch did not play, the Seahawks relied on Thomas Rawls. He finished the game with 255 total yards. All four of the Seahawks' touchdowns were scored by rookies as Tyler Lockett and Thomas Rawls both put up a pair of touchdowns in the win. Again, Russell Wilson was efficient, going 24–29 with 260 passing yards and 3 passing touchdowns.

With the win, the Seahawks improved to 5–5. Additionally, Wilson improved to 7–2 against the 49ers (including postseason), extending his winning streak against them to five games.

==== Week 12: vs. Pittsburgh Steelers ====
Week Twelve: Pittsburgh Steelers at Seattle Seahawks – Game summary

Quarter	1	2	3	4	Total
Steelers	3	15	3	9	30
Seahawks	0	14	6	19	39

at CenturyLink Field, Seattle, Washington

- Date: November 29
- Game time: 1:25 p.m. PST
- Game weather: 38 °F (3 °C), cloudy
- Game attendance: 69,055
- Referee: Walt Anderson
- TV announcers (CBS): Jim Nantz, Phil Simms and Tracy Wolfson
- Recap, Gamebook

Game information

First quarter

- PIT – Chris Boswell 44-yard field goal, 5:32 (PIT 3–0)

Second quarter

- SEA – Doug Baldwin 16-yard pass from Russell Wilson (Steven Hauschka kick), 12:18 (SEA 7–3)
- PIT – Martavis Bryant 11-yard run (Chris Boswell kick), 8:39 (PIT 10–7)
- SEA – Jermaine Kearse 12-yard pass from Russell Wilson (Steven Hauschka kick), 2:10 (SEA 14–10)
- PIT – DeAngelo Williams 6-yard run (2-pt PAT: Ben Roethlisberger pass to Jesse James), 0:56 (PIT 18–14)

Third quarter

- PIT – Chris Boswell 25-yard field goal, 5:51 (PIT 21–14)
- SEA – Thomas Rawls 1-yard run (Steven Hauschka kick is no good), 3:00 (PIT 21–20)

Fourth quarter

- SEA – Jermaine Kearse 9-yard pass from Russell Wilson (2-pt PAT: Russell Wilson pass incomplete), 12:17 (SEA 26–21)
- PIT – Markus Wheaton 69-yard pass from Ben Roethlisberger (2-pt PAT: Ben Roethlisberger pass incomplete), 11:40 (PIT 27–26)
- SEA – Doug Baldwin 30-yard pass from Russell Wilson (2-pt PAT: Thomas Rawls run short), 8:12 (SEA 32–27)
- PIT – Chris Boswell 22-yard field goal, 3:00 (SEA 32–30)
- SEA – Doug Baldwin 80-yard pass from Russell Wilson (Steven Hauschka kick), 2:01 (SEA 39–30)

Top passers

- PIT – Ben Roethlisberger: 36/55, 456 yds, 1 TD, 2 INT
- SEA – Russell Wilson: 21/30, 345 yds, 5 TD

Top rushers

- PIT – DeAngelo Williams: 8 car, 29 yds, 1 TD
- SEA – Thomas Rawls: 21 car, 81 yds, 1 TD

Top receivers

- PIT – Markus Wheaton: 9 rec, 201 yds, 1 TD
- SEA – Doug Baldwin: 6 rec, 145 yds, 3 TD

Top tacklers

- PIT – Mike Mitchell: 6 solo, 2 asst
- SEA – Bobby Wagner: 7 solo, 5 asst, ff, pd

Team – pass – rush – total – to

- PIT – 480 – 58 – 538 – 4
- SEA – 336 – 100 – 436 – 0

After handling the 49ers at home, the Seahawks hosted the Pittsburgh Steelers for the first time since the 2003 season. Richard Sherman, who has not intercepted a pass in the first 12 games of the season, recorded his first in the third quarter. The game was a shootout as Russell Wilson, playing on his 27th birthday, passed for 345 yards and threw five touchdown passes (three of them to wide receiver Doug Baldwin). Steelers quarterback Ben Roethlisberger passed for 456 yards against the Seahawks' defense, which were the most passing yards the Seahawks have ever allowed to an opposing quarterback until Matt Schaub's 460 yards passing surpassed it in 2019.

With the win, the Seahawks improved to 6–5 and earned their first win of the season against a team with a winning record.

The victory was bittersweet, however, as Jimmy Graham suffered an apparent leg injury in the third quarter. It was later revealed that Graham tore the patellar tendon in his knee. The Seahawks announced afterwards that Graham would undergo surgery and miss the rest of the season.

==== Week 13: at Minnesota Vikings ====
Week Thirteen: Seattle Seahawks at Minnesota Vikings – Game summary

Quarter	1	2	3	4	Total
Seahawks	7	14	14	3	38
Vikings	0	0	7	0	7

at TCF Bank Stadium, Minneapolis, Minnesota

- Date: December 6
- Game time: 12:00 p.m. CST/10:00 a.m. PST
- Game weather: 37 °F (3 °C), cloudy
- Game attendance: 52,430
- Referee: Terry McAulay
- TV announcers (Fox): Kevin Burkhardt, John Lynch and Pam Oliver
- Recap, Gamebook

Game information

First quarter

- SEA – Thomas Rawls 5-yard run (Steven Hauschka kick), 3:36 (SEA 7–0)

Second quarter

- SEA – Russell Wilson 8-yard run (Steven Hauschka kick), 2:04 (SEA 14–0)
- SEA – Doug Baldwin 20-yard pass from Russell Wilson (Steven Hauschka kick), 1:04 (SEA 21–0)

Third quarter

- SEA – Fred Jackson 5-yard pass from Russell Wilson (Steven Hauschka kick), 9:12 (SEA 28–0)
- SEA – Doug Baldwin 53-yard pass from Russell Wilson (Steven Hauschka kick), 1:01 (SEA 35–0)
- MIN – Cordarrelle Patterson 101-yard kickoff return (Blair Walsh kick), 0:48 (SEA 35–7)

Fourth quarter

- SEA – Steven Hauschka 23-yard field goal, 8:00 (SEA 38–7)

Top passers

- SEA – Russell Wilson: 21/27, 274 yds, 3 TD
- MIN – Teddy Bridgewater: 17/28, 118 yds, INT

Top rushers

- SEA – Thomas Rawls: 21 car, 81 yds, 1 TD
- MIN – Adrian Peterson: 8 car, 18 yds

Top receivers

- SEA – Doug Baldwin: 5 rec, 94 yds, 2 TD
- MIN – Mike Wallace: 2 rec, 43 yds

Top tacklers

- SEA – K. J. Wright: 9 solo, 1 asst
- MIN – Robert Blanton: 7 solo, 2 asst

Team – pass – rush – total – to

- SEA – 260 – 173 – 433 – 1
- MIN – 94 – 31 – 125 – 1

Coming off huge home wins against the 49ers and Steelers, the Seahawks traveled to Minneapolis to take on the Minnesota Vikings. Despite being without both Marshawn Lynch and Jimmy Graham, the Seahawks dominated the Vikings 38–7. Going into the game, the Vikings were previously 8–3 and leading the NFC North, led the NFL in team rushing yards, and Adrian Peterson was the NFL's leading rusher. The Seahawks defense held Peterson to only 18 yards and the Vikings' offense failed to score (their only points coming on a special-teams kickoff return), while Russell Wilson and the Seattle offense racked up 433 yards, five total touchdowns, and no interceptions.

==== Week 14: at Baltimore Ravens ====
Week Fourteen: Seattle Seahawks at Baltimore Ravens – Game summary

Quarter	1	2	3	4	Total
Seahawks	7	7	7	14	35
Ravens	0	6	0	0	6

at M&T Bank Stadium, Baltimore, Maryland

- Date: December 13
- Game time: 1:00 p.m. EST/10:00 a.m. PST
- Game weather: 67 °F (19 °C), cloudy
- Game attendance: 71,179
- Referee: Walt Coleman
- TV announcers (Fox): Thom Brennaman, Charles Davis and Tony Siragusa
- Recap, Gamebook

Game information

First quarter

- SEA – Tyler Lockett 8-yard pass from Russell Wilson (Steven Hauschka kick), 5:08 (SEA 7–0)

Second quarter

- BAL – Justin Tucker 28-yard field goal, 13:39 (SEA 7–3)
- SEA – Doug Baldwin 14-yard pass from Russell Wilson (Steven Hauschka kick), 0:38 (SEA 14–3)
- BAL – Justin Tucker 30-yard field goal, 0:00 (SEA 14–6)

Third quarter

- SEA – Doug Baldwin 22-yard pass from Russell Wilson (Steven Hauschka kick), 8:54 (SEA 21–6)

Fourth quarter

- SEA – Tyler Lockett 49-yard pass from Russell Wilson (Steven Hauschka kick), 14:53 (SEA 28–6)
- SEA – Doug Baldwin 16-yard pass from Russell Wilson (Steven Hauschka kick), 8:55 (SEA 35–6)

Top passers

- SEA – Russell Wilson: 23/32, 292 yds, 5 TD
- BAL – Jimmy Clausen: 23/40, 274 yds, 1 INT

Top rushers

- SEA – DuJuan Harris: 18 car, 42 yds
- BAL – Javorius Allen: 8 car, 14 yds

Top receivers

- SEA – Tyler Lockett: 6 rec, 104 yds, 2 TD
- BAL – Kamar Aiken: 5 rec, 90 yds

Top tacklers

- SEA – K. J. Wright: 5 solo, 3 asst
- BAL – Shareece Wright: 7 solo, 2 asst

Team – pass – rush – total – to

- SEA – 301 – 123 – 424 – 1
- BAL – 274 – 28 – 302 – 2

After easily handling the Vikings in Minneapolis, the Seahawks traveled to Baltimore to take on the Ravens. Russell Wilson's streak of games with greater than a 135 passer rating continued as he again tied the franchise mark of five touchdown passes to go with zero interceptions. Doug Baldwin's success over the same span also continued as he hauled in three passes for touchdowns. Early in the game, running back Thomas Rawls and safety Kam Chancellor left the game with injuries. With Rawls now out for the year with a broken left ankle, the Seahawks turned to DuJuan Harris. Harris was limited to just 42 rushing yards on 18 carries.

With the win, the Seahawks improved to 8–5. Furthermore, the Seahawks' all–time franchise regular season win–loss record improved to 313–312–0. This marks the first time ever in team history that the Seahawks have had an overall winning regular season win–loss record (a win–loss record above .500).

==== Week 15: vs. Cleveland Browns ====
Week Fifteen: Cleveland Browns at Seattle Seahawks – Game summary

Quarter	1	2	3	4	Total
Browns	7	3	0	3	13
Seahawks	7	13	0	10	30

at CenturyLink Field, Seattle, Washington

- Date: December 20
- Game time: 1:05 p.m. PST
- Game weather: 47 °F (8 °C), cloudy
- Game attendance: 69,002
- Referee: Gene Steratore
- TV announcers (Fox): Thom Brennaman, Charles Davis and Tony Siragusa
- Recap, Gamebook

Game information

First quarter

- CLE – Gary Barnidge 7-yard pass from Johnny Manziel (Travis Coons kick), 8:13. Browns 7–0. Drive: 15 plays, 80 yards, 6:53.
- SEA – Doug Baldwin 3-yard pass from Russell Wilson (Steven Hauschka kick), 0:47. Tied 7–7. Drive: 14 plays, 69 yards, 7:24.

Second quarter

- SEA – Doug Baldwin 6-yard pass from Russell Wilson (Steven Hauschka kick), 10:01. Seahawks 14–7. Drive: 8 plays, 57 yards, 3:52.
- CLE – Travis Coons 34-yard field goal, 6:35. Seahawks 14–10. Drive: 8 plays, 36 yards, 3:25.
- SEA – Steven Hauschka 49-yard field goal, 1:00. Seahawks 17–10. Drive: 12 plays, 57 yards, 5:36.
- SEA – Steven Hauschka 27-yard field goal, 0:00. Seahawks 20–10. Drive: 4 plays, 64 yards, 0:16.

Third quarter

- No scoring plays

Fourth quarter

- SEA – Tyler Lockett 27-yard pass from Russell Wilson (Steven Hauschka kick), 15:00. Seahawks 27–10. Drive: 10 plays, 96 yards, 6:00.
- CLE – Travis Coons 37-yard field goal, 9:07. Seahawks 27–13. Drive: 9 plays, 61 yards, 5:52.
- SEA – Steven Hauschka 30-yard field goal, 3:37. Seahawks 30–13. Drive: 13 plays, 68 yards, 5:28.

Top passers

- CLE – Johnny Manziel – 19/32, 161 yards, TD, INT
- SEA – Russell Wilson – 21/30, 249 yards, 3 TD

Top rushers

- CLE – Duke Johnson – 4 rushes, 46 yards
- SEA – Christine Michael – 16 rushes, 84 yards

Top receivers

- CLE – Duke Johnson – 5 receptions, 39 yards
- SEA – Jermaine Kearse – 7 receptions, 110 yards

Top tacklers

- CLE – Karlos Dansby – 4 tackles, 6 assists
- SEA – Kelcie McCray – 5 tackles, 3 assists, 1 pass defended

Team – pass – rush – total – to

- CLE – 136 – 94 – 230 – 1
- SEA – 241 – 182 – 423 – 0

After a huge win against the Ravens in Baltimore, the Seahawks returned home to host the Cleveland Browns. Russell Wilson's streak continued: Over the last five games he threw for 19 touchdowns and zero interceptions. Doug Baldwin compiled 10 touchdowns over the last four games, which has only been achieved one other time (Jerry Rice in 1987). With the injury of Thomas Rawls the week prior Derrick Coleman got the start at running back but Christine Michael took the majority of the carries.

With the win, the Seahawks improved to 9–5 and clinched a playoff spot after winning five straight games. Furthermore, the Seahawks' all–time franchise regular season win–loss record improved to 314–312–0. This marks the first time ever in team history that the Seahawks have had an overall regular season win–loss record of at least two games above .500.

==== Week 16: vs. St. Louis Rams ====
Week Sixteen: St. Louis Rams at Seattle Seahawks – Game summary

Quarter	1	2	3	4	Total
Rams	10	6	0	7	23
Seahawks	0	3	7	7	17

at CenturyLink Field, Seattle, Washington

- Date: December 27
- Game time: 1:25 p.m. PST
- Game weather: 37 °F (3 °C), cloudy
- Game attendance: 69,080
- Referee: John Hussey
- TV announcers (Fox): Chris Myers, Ronde Barber and Holly Sonders
- Recap, Gamebook

Game information

First quarter

- STL – Greg Zuerlein 42-yard field goal, 8:10 (STL 3–0)
- STL – Akeem Ayers 45-yard fumble return (Greg Zuerlein kick), 6:34 (STL 10–0)

Second quarter

- STL – Kenny Britt 28-yard pass from Case Keenum (Greg Zuerlein kick is no good), 6:43 (STL 16–0)
- SEA – Steven Hauschka 26-yard field goal, 0:15 (STL 16–3)

Third quarter

- SEA – Doug Baldwin 25-yard pass from Russell Wilson (Steven Hauschka kick), 8:23 (STL 16–10)

Fourth quarter

- STL – Todd Gurley 2-yard run (Greg Zuerlein kick), 10:34 (STL 23–10)
- SEA – Jermaine Kearse 18-yard pass from Russell Wilson (Steven Hauschka kick), 0:17 (STL 23–17)

Top passers

- STL – Case Keenum: 14/23, 103 yds, 1 TD
- SEA – Russell Wilson: 25/41, 289 yds, 2 TD, 1 INT

Top rushers

- STL – Todd Gurley: 19 car, 85 yds, 1 TD
- SEA – Russell Wilson: 6 car, 39 yds

Top receivers

- STL – Kenny Britt: 3 rec, 49 yds, 1 TD
- SEA – Doug Baldwin: 8 rec, 118 yds, 1 TD

Top tacklers

- STL – William Hayes: 7 solo, 2 asst, 3 sacks
- SEA – Bobby Wagner: 9 solo, 2 asst, pd

Team – pass – rush – total – to

- STL – 103 – 104 – 207 – 0
- SEA – 253 – 60 – 313 – 3

After easily defeating the Cleveland Browns at home, the Seahawks remained at home to host the St. Louis Rams. Doug Baldwin's touchdown reception in the third quarter surpasses Daryl Turner's mark set in 1985 for the most receiving touchdowns by a Seahawk in a single season with 14.

With the loss, the Seahawks drop to 9–6, snapping a five-game winning streak. The Rams have swept the season series for the first time since 2004.

This marks the first time in 71 games (including postseason) the Seahawks have not held the lead at any point during the game. This is also the first such instance during the Wilson era. Prior to this game, the Seahawks have held the lead at least once during the game for an NFL-record 70 consecutive games (including postseason). Additionally, the Seahawks' 25-game streak of having 100 rushing yards as a team (another NFL record) came to an end.

==== Week 17: at Arizona Cardinals ====
Week Seventeen: Seattle Seahawks at Arizona Cardinals – Game summary

Quarter	1	2	3	4	Total
Seahawks	10	20	6	0	36
Cardinals	0	6	0	0	6

at University of Phoenix Stadium, Glendale, Arizona

- Date: January 3, 2016
- Game time: 2:25 p.m. MST/1:25 p.m. PST
- Game weather: Played indoors (retractable roof closed)
- Game attendance: 64,646
- Referee: Brad Allen
- TV announcers (Fox): Joe Buck, Troy Aikman and Erin Andrews
- Recap, Gamebook

Game information

First quarter

- SEA – Bryce Brown 1-yard run (Steven Hauschka kick), 5:22 (SEA 7–0)
- SEA – Steven Hauschka 52-yard field goal, 3:08 (SEA 10–0)

Second quarter

- ARI – Larry Fitzgerald 17-yard pass from Carson Palmer (Chandler Catanzaro kick is no good), 11:59 (SEA 10–6)
- SEA – Will Tukuafu 7-yard pass from Russell Wilson (Steven Hauschka kick), 6:02 (SEA 17–6)
- SEA – Chase Coffman 8-yard pass from Russell Wilson (Steven Hauschka kick), 3:51 (SEA 24–6)
- SEA – Jermaine Kearse 24-yard pass from Russell Wilson (Steven Hauschka kick is no good), 2:08 (SEA 30–6)

Third quarter

- SEA – Steven Hauschka 33-yard field goal, 9:39 (SEA 33–6)
- SEA – Steven Hauschka 52-yard field goal, 4:49 (SEA 36–6)

Fourth quarter

- No scoring plays

Top passers

- SEA – Russell Wilson: 19/28, 197 yds, 3 TD
- ARI – Carson Palmer: 12/25, 129 yds, 1 TD, 1 INT

Top rushers

- SEA – Christine Michael: 17 car, 102 yds
- ARI – David Johnson: 11 car, 25 yds

Top receivers

- SEA – Doug Baldwin: 5 rec, 46 yds
- ARI – Larry Fitzgerald: 6 rec, 55 yds, 1 TD

Top tacklers

- SEA – K. J. Wright: 5 solo, 1 asst
- ARI – Deone Bucannon: 8 solo, 1 asst

Team – pass – rush – total – to

- SEA – 209 – 145 – 354 – 0
- ARI – 205 – 27 – 232 – 3

In their final game of the regular season, the Seahawks routed the Arizona Cardinals 36–6, holding the Cardinals' then number one scoring offense to only six points, allowing the Seahawks to finish as the number one scoring defense for the fourth consecutive season, an NFL record. During the game, Russell Wilson set two franchise records passing: 4,024 yards in a season, topping Matt Hasselbeck's 3,966 yards set in 2007, and 34 touchdowns through the air, surpassing Dave Krieg's 32 touchdowns in 1984. Helping Wilson get the franchise record for passing touchdowns in a season was Doug Baldwin, as he was the co-leader for touchdown receptions in the 2015 season with 14 touchdowns.

=== Postseason ===
Seattle entered the postseason as the #6 seed in the NFC.

==== NFC Wild Card Playoffs: at #3 Minnesota Vikings ====
NFC Wild Card Playoffs: #6 Seattle Seahawks at #3 Minnesota Vikings – Game summary

Quarter	1	2	3	4	Total
Seahawks	0	0	0	10	10
Vikings	3	0	6	0	9

at TCF Bank Stadium, Minneapolis, Minnesota

- Date: January 10, 2016
- Game time: 12:05 p.m. CST/10:05 a.m. PST
- Game weather: −6 °F (−21 °C), clear
- Game attendance: 52,090
- Referee: Walt Coleman
- TV announcers (NBC): Al Michaels, Cris Collinsworth and Michele Tafoya
- Recap, Gamebook

Game information

First quarter

- MIN – Blair Walsh 22-yard field goal, 1:01 (MIN 3–0)

Second quarter

- No scoring plays

Third quarter

- MIN – Blair Walsh 43-yard field goal, 7:04 (MIN 6–0)
- MIN – Blair Walsh 47-yard field goal, 0:02 (MIN 9–0)

Fourth quarter

- SEA – Doug Baldwin 3-yard pass from Russell Wilson (Steven Hauschka kick), 11:37 (MIN 9–7)
- SEA – Steven Hauschka 46-yard field goal, 8:04 (SEA 10–9)

Top passers

- SEA – Russell Wilson: 13/26, 142 yds, 1 TD, 1 INT
- MIN – Teddy Bridgewater: 17/24, 146 yds

Top rushers

- SEA – Christine Michael: 21 car, 70 yds
- MIN – Adrian Peterson: 23 car, 45 yds

Top receivers

- SEA – Doug Baldwin: 5 rec, 42 yds, 1 TD
- MIN – Stefon Diggs: 4 rec, 26 yds

Top tacklers

- SEA – Bobby Wagner: 6 solo, 2 asst, 1 sack
- MIN – Eric Kendricks: 4 solo, 4 asst, 2 pd

Team – pass – rush – total – to

- SEA – 129 – 97 – 226 – 1
- MIN – 125 – 58 – 183 – 1

The #6 seeded Seahawks traveled to Minnesota to face the #3 seeded Vikings in a game that was the third coldest in NFL history as the two teams squared off in subzero temperatures. The field goal filled contest came down to a Vikings 27-yard field goal with 26 seconds left in the fourth quarter but the kick went wide-left giving the Seahawks the victory.

==== NFC Divisional Playoffs: at #1 Carolina Panthers ====
NFC Divisional Playoffs: #6 Seattle Seahawks at #1 Carolina Panthers – Game summary

Quarter	1	2	3	4	Total
Seahawks	0	0	14	10	24
Panthers	14	17	0	0	31

at Bank of America Stadium, Charlotte, North Carolina

- Date: January 17, 2016
- Game time: 1:05 p.m. EST/10:05 a.m. PST
- Game weather: 43 °F (6 °C), partly cloudy
- Game attendance: 74,287
- Referee: Tony Corrente
- TV announcers (Fox): Joe Buck, Troy Aikman, Erin Andrews and Chris Myers
- Recap, Gamebook

Game information

First quarter

- CAR – Jonathan Stewart 4-yard run (Graham Gano kick), 12:30 (CAR 7-0)
- CAR – Luke Kuechly 14-yard interception return (Graham Gano kick), 11:38 (CAR 14-0)

Second quarter

- CAR – Jonathan Stewart 1-yard run (Graham Gano kick), 14:18 (CAR 21-0)
- CAR – Graham Gano 48-yard field goal, 12:37 (CAR 24-0)
- CAR – Greg Olsen 19-yard pass from Cam Newton (Graham Gano kick), 6:26 (CAR 31-0)

Third quarter

- SEA – Jermaine Kearse 13-yard pass from Russell Wilson (Steven Hauschka kick), 13:27 (CAR 31-7)
- SEA – Tyler Lockett 33-yard pass from Russell Wilson (Steven Hauschka kick), 7:40 (CAR 31-14)

Fourth quarter

- SEA – Jermaine Kearse 3-yard pass from Russell Wilson (Steven Hauschka kick), 6:04 (CAR 31-21)
- SEA – Steven Hauschka 36-yard field goal, 1:12 (CAR 31-24)

Top passers

- SEA – Russell Wilson: 31/48, 366 yds, 3 TD, 2 INT
- CAR – Cam Newton: 16/22, 161 yds, 1 TD

Top rushers

- SEA – Marshawn Lynch: 6 car, 20 yds
- CAR – Jonathan Stewart: 19 car, 106 yds, 2 TD

Top receivers

- SEA – Jermaine Kearse: 11 rec, 110 yds, 2 TD
- CAR – Greg Olsen: 6 rec, 77 yds, 1 TD

Top tacklers

- SEA – K. J. Wright: 6 solo, 8 asst
- CAR – Luke Kuechly: 3 solo, 8 asst, 1 int, 2 pd

Team – pass – rush – total – to

- SEA – 325 – 78 – 403 – 2
- CAR – 151 – 144 – 295 – 0

The Seahawks traveled to Charlotte to face the #1 seeded Carolina Panthers. The Panthers scored early and often in the first half, going into halftime with a 31–0 lead. The Seahawks fought back aggressively in the second half, cutting the lead to only one possession and holding the Panthers from scoring in the second half, but fell short of a victory after the Panthers successfully recovered an onside kick and kneeled out the clock, with a final score of 31–24.

It was Marshawn Lynch's final game as he announced his retirement on February 7, 2016. He was held to just 20 rushing yards. However, Lynch would return to the NFL in April 2017 as a member of the Oakland Raiders before returning to the Seahawks in December 2019.

== Standings ==
=== Division ===
NFC West
	W	L	T	PCT	DIV	CONF	PF	PA	STK
^{(2)} Arizona Cardinals	13	3	0	.813	4–2	10–2	489	313	L1
^{(6)} Seattle Seahawks	10	6	0	.625	3–3	7–5	423	277	W1
St. Louis Rams	7	9	0	.438	4–2	6–6	280	330	L1
San Francisco 49ers	5	11	0	.313	1–5	4–8	238	387	W1

=== Conference ===
NFC
#	Team	Division	W	L	T	PCT	DIV	CONF	SOS	SOV	STK
Division Leaders
1	Carolina Panthers	South	15	1	0	.938	5–1	11–1	.441	.438	W1
2	Arizona Cardinals	West	13	3	0	.813	4–2	10–2	.477	.457	L1
3	Minnesota Vikings	North	11	5	0	.688	5–1	8–4	.504	.449	W3
4	Washington Redskins	East	9	7	0	.563	4–2	8–4	.465	.403	W4
Wild Cards
5 (Note: Green Bay finished ahead of Seattle based on head-to-head victory.)	Green Bay Packers	North	10	6	0	.625	3–3	7–5	.531	.450	L2
6	Seattle Seahawks	West	10	6	0	.625	3–3	7–5	.520	.431	W1
Did not qualify for the postseason
7	Atlanta Falcons	South	8	8	0	.500	1–5	5–7	.480	.453	L1
8 (Note: St. Louis and Detroit finished ahead of Philadelphia and New Orleans based on conference record. St. Louis finished ahead of Detroit based on head-to-head victory. Detroit finished ahead of Philadelphia and New Orleans based on head-to-head sweep, while Philadelphia finished ahead of New Orleans based on head-to-head victory.)	St. Louis Rams	West	7	9	0	.438	4–2	6–6	.527	.482	L1
9	Detroit Lions	North	7	9	0	.438	3–3	6–6	.535	.429	W3
10	Philadelphia Eagles	East	7	9	0	.438	3–3	4–8	.508	.473	W1
11	New Orleans Saints	South	7	9	0	.438	3–3	5–7	.504	.402	W2
12 (Note: The New York Giants and Chicago each finished ahead of Tampa Bay based on head-to-head victory, while the Giants finished ahead of Chicago based on conference record.)	New York Giants	East	6	10	0	.375	2–4	4–8	.500	.396	L3
13	Chicago Bears	North	6	10	0	.375	1–5	3–9	.547	.469	L1
14	Tampa Bay Buccaneers	South	6	10	0	.375	3–3	5–7	.484	.406	L4
15	San Francisco 49ers	West	5	11	0	.313	1–5	4–8	.539	.463	W1
16	Dallas Cowboys	East	4	12	0	.250	3–3	3–9	.531	.438	L4
Tiebreakers (Note: When breaking ties for three or more teams under the NFL's rules, they are first broken within divisions, then comparing only the highest-ranked remaining team from each division.)
