= Kam Chancellor =

American football player (born 1988)

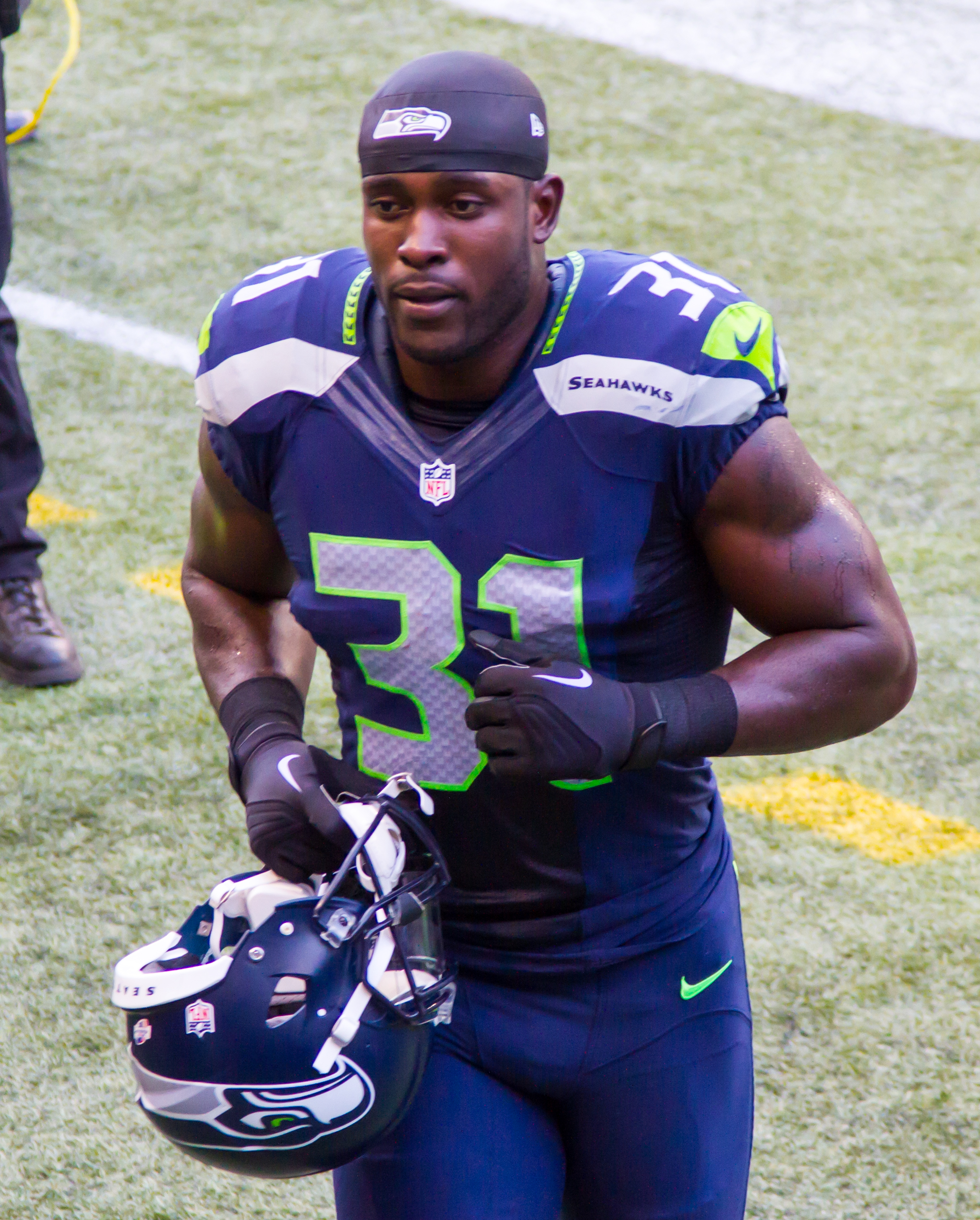
- Chancellor with the Seattle Seahawks in 2013

No. 31
- Position: Safety

Personal information
- Born: April 3, 1988 (age 38); Norfolk, Virginia, U.S.
- Listed height: 6 ft 3 in (1.91 m)
- Listed weight: 225 lb (102 kg)

Career information
- High school: Maury (Norfolk)
- College: Virginia Tech (2006–2009)
- NFL draft: 2010: 5th round, 133rd overall pick

Career history
- Seattle Seahawks (2010–2018)

Awards and highlights
- Super Bowl champion (XLVIII); 2× Second-team All-Pro (2013, 2014); 4× Pro Bowl (2011, 2013–2015); Seattle Seahawks Top 50 players; Second-team All-ACC (2009)

Career NFL statistics
- Total tackles: 607
- Sacks: 2.0
- Forced fumbles: 9
- Fumble recoveries: 3
- Interceptions: 12
- Stats at Pro Football Reference

Kameron Darnel Chancellor (born April 3, 1988), nicknamed "Bam Bam Kam", is an American former professional football safety who spent his entire nine-year career with the Seattle Seahawks of the National Football League (NFL). He played college football for the Virginia Tech Hokies prior to being selected by the Seahawks in the fifth round of the 2010 NFL draft. A four-time Pro Bowler, he was one of the key members of their Legion of Boom secondary. He also helped lead the Seahawks to victory in Super Bowl XLVIII. Chancellor retired following complications from a neck injury he suffered in 2017.

== Early life ==
Chancellor was born in Norfolk, Virginia on April 3, 1988. He attended Matthew Fontaine Maury High School where he played basketball and football as a quarterback and safety for the Commodores athletic teams. As a senior in 2005, he recorded more than 2,000 passing yards and 500 rushing yards and led his team to a 10–2 record and an appearance in the Group AAA Division 5 playoffs. Chancellor was named the team's most valuable player, and he was also placed on the All-Eastern District first-team as well as The Virginian-Pilot All-Tidewater second-team. Rivals.com assessed him as the 27th-ranked pro-style quarterback prospect in the nation and the 20th-ranked player in the state of Virginia. SuperPrep and The Roanoke Times rated him the 21st-ranked player in the state. The 247Sports recruiting site assessed Chancellor as a three-star recruit and he accepted a scholarship offer from Virginia Tech.

College recruiting
Name	Hometown	School	Height	Weight	40^{‡}	Commit date
Kameron Chancellor strong safety	Norfolk, Virginia	Maury High School	6 ft 2 in (1.88 m)	200 lb (91 kg)	4.6	Dec 5, 2005
Kameron Chancellor strong safety	Recruit ratings: Scout: Rivals:					
Overall recruit ranking: Scout: NR (QB) Rivals: – National, 27 (QB), 20 (Vir)
‡ Refers to 40-yard dash; Note: In many cases, Scout, Rivals, 247Sports, On3, and ESPN may conflict in their listings of height, weight and 40 time.; In these cases, the average was taken. ESPN grades are on a 100-point scale.; Sources: "Virginia Tech Football Commitments". Rivals.; "2006 Virginia Tech Football Recruiting Commits". Scout.; "Scout.com Team Recruiting Rankings". Scout.; "2006 Team Ranking". Rivals.com.

== College career ==
Chancellor enrolled at Virginia Tech in 2006 to study human development. He worked out as a quarterback before eventually being moved to the cornerback position prior to the start of the season. He saw action that year as a true freshman in all 13 games, and recorded nine tackles, two broken up passes, and one interception.

In 2007, he was moved to the rover position as the starter and also played on special teams. He started in all 14 games and recorded 79 tackles, seven broken-up passes, three quarterback hurries, and one interception as a sophomore.

Before the 2008 season, Chancellor was moved to the free safety position, his third position change in three of four years at Virginia Tech. Chancellor started in all 14 games and recorded 52 tackles, of which 27 were solo, two interceptions, five broken-up passes, seven pass deflections, one forced fumble, and two fumble recoveries. After the season, he considered entering the 2009 NFL draft a year early, but decided to remain at Virginia Tech for his senior season.

Before his senior season in 2009, Hokies' defensive backs coach, Torrian Gray said that Chancellor could be "the greatest safety in Virginia Tech history. In his senior season, Chancellor recorded two interceptions, one fumble return, 68 total tackles, three tackles-for-loss, and four broken-up passes. Chancellor has said that he attempts to emulate the late Washington Redskins safety Sean Taylor, and said, "[He was a] big safety, the prototype guy for the position. I'm a big safety, too, and I've just always wanted to be just like him. I don't necessarily say I can be Sean Taylor before it's over, but I think I can be just as good." Also, before games and when he needs motivation, Chancellor says he watched the highlights of Sean Taylor on YouTube. He says it motivated him to do better, strive for greater things, and took him to a darker place which makes him play better. The CBS Sports-affiliated NFL Draft Scout considered Chancellor the third-ranked of the 126 free safeties available for the 2010 NFL draft and projected him as a third-round selection.

Chancellor was elected to the Virginia Tech Sports Hall of Fame in 2022.

== Professional career ==
External videos
- Kam Chancellor's NFL Combine workout

Pre-draft measurables
Height	Weight	Arm length	Hand span	Wingspan	40-yard dash	10-yard split	20-yard split	20-yard shuttle	Three-cone drill	Vertical jump	Broad jump	Bench press
6 ft 3 1/4 in (1.91 m)	231 lb (105 kg)	33 in (0.84 m)	9 1/2 in (0.24 m)	6 ft 4 1/2 in (1.94 m)	4.59 s	1.61 s	2.67 s	4.41 s	7.36 s	32 in (0.81 m)	9 ft 8 in (2.95 m)	22 reps
All values from NFL Combine/Pro Day

=== 2010 ===
The Seattle Seahawks selected Chancellor in the fifth round (133rd overall) of the 2010 NFL draft. He became the second safety drafted by the Seahawks in 2010, following first round pick (14th overall) Earl Thomas. Chancellor was the ninth safety drafted in 2010.

On June 2, 2010, the Seattle Seahawks signed Chancellor to a four-year, $2 million contract that included a signing bonus of $213,000.

Throughout training camp, he competed for a job at strong safety against Lawyer Milloy, Kevin Ellison, and Jordan Babineaux. Head coach Pete Carroll named Chancellor the third strong safety on the depth chart to start the regular season, behind veterans Milloy and Babineaux.

He made his professional regular season debut in the Seattle Seahawks' season-opening 31–6 victory against the San Francisco 49ers. On September 26, 2010, Chancellor recorded his first career tackle on Darren Sproles after Sproles returned a kickoff for 22 yards. Chancellor forced a fumble that was recovered by Dexter Davis. He finished their 27–20 victory with two solo tackles and one forced fumble. On October 31, 2010, Chancellor recorded two solo tackles and had his first career sack on quarterback Jason Campbell for a three-yard loss during a 33–3 loss at the Oakland Raiders. The following week, he set a season-high with seven combined tackles (five solo) during a 41–7 loss to the New York Giants. He finished his rookie season with 23 combined tackles (17 solo), a pass deflection, a sack, and a forced fumble in 16 games and no starts.

=== 2011 ===
He entered training camp slated to takeover as the starting strong safety following the departures of Lawyer Milloy and Jordan Babineaux. Defensive coordinator Gus Bradley named Chancellor the starting strong safety to begin the regular season, pairing him with free safety Earl Thomas.

On September 11, 2011, Chancellor earned his first career start in the Seattle Seahawks' season-opener at the San Francisco 49ers and set a season-high with ten solo tackles as they lost 33–17. On September 25, 2011, Chancellor collected five combined tackles, two pass deflections, and made his first career interception off a pass attempt by quarterback Kevin Kolb during their 13–10 victory against the Arizona Cardinals. He missed the following game (Week 4), after sustaining a quadriceps injury. On December 24, 2011, Chancellor tied his season-high of ten solo tackles during a 19–17 loss to the San Francisco 49ers. He finished his first season as a starter with 97 combined tackles (75 solo), a career-high 13 pass deflections, four interceptions, and a sack in 15 games and 15 starts. Chancellor ranked second for the Seahawks in both tackles and interceptions. On January 25, 2012, it was announced that Chancellor was added to the 2012 Pro Bowl roster as a replacement for Dashon Goldson of the San Francisco 49ers.

=== 2012 ===
Defensive coordinator Gus Bradley retained Chancellor and Thomas as the starting safeties to start the 2012 regular season. On October 14, 2012, he recorded a season-high 11 combined tackles (seven solo) during a 24–23 victory against the New England Patriots. In Week 11, Chancellor tied his season-high with 11 combined tackles (eight solo) in the Seahawks' 28–24 loss at the Detroit Lions. He finished his third season with a career-high 101 combined tackles (75 solo) and four pass deflections in 16 games and 16 starts.

=== 2013 ===
On April 22, 2013, the Seattle Seahawks signed Chancellor to a four-year, $28 million contract that included $17 million guaranteed and a $5 million signing bonus.

New defensive coordinator Dan Quinn retained Chancellor and Thomas as the starting safeties to begin the regular season. In Week 2, Chancellor recorded five combined tackles, broke up a pass, and intercepted a pass by Colin Kaepernick during the Seahawks' 29–3 victory against the San Francisco 49ers. On December 22, 2013, he collected a season-high 11 combined tackles (six solo), two pass deflections, and an interception as they lost 17–10 to the Arizona Cardinals. He finished the 2013 season with 99 combined tackles (65 solo), six pass, and three interceptions in 16 games and 16 starts. He was named to his second Pro Bowl.

The Seattle Seahawks finished the season atop the NFC West with a 13–3 record and clinched a playoff berth and a first round bye. On January 11, 2014, Chancellor started his first career playoff game and recorded 14 combined tackles (four solo) and two pass deflections during the Seahawks' 23–15 victory against the New Orleans Saints in the NFC Divisional Round. The Seahawks defeated the San Francisco 49ers 23–17 in the NFC Championship and went on to Super Bowl XLVIII. On February 2, 2014, Chancellor made ten combined tackles (six solo), deflected two passes, and intercepted a pass by quarterback Peyton Manning as the Seahawks won Super Bowl XLVIII 43–8 against the Denver Broncos. He was ranked 65th by his fellow players on the NFL Top 100 Players of 2014.

=== 2014 ===
Chancellor began the season being selected as a team captain by his teammates, along with Russell Wilson, Jon Ryan, and Steven Hauschka. He started the Seattle Seahawks' season-opener against the Green Bay Packers and recorded a season-high 11 combined tackles (eight solo) during a 36–16 victory. On September 21, 2014, in a Super Bowl XLVIII rematch with the Denver Broncos, Chancellor recorded nine tackles, an interception, a forced fumble, and two passes defended in a 26–20 victory, winning the NFC Defensive Player of the Week Award. Chancellor earned another NFC Defensive Player of the Week nomination for his Week 12 game against the Arizona Cardinals. At the end of the regular season he was selected for the third Pro Bowl of his career and voted in the Second-team All-Pro by the Associated Press.

In the Seahawks' Divisional Round game against the Carolina Panthers, Chancellor had a career game in which he recorded nine solo tackles, two assists, and an interception, which was returned 87 yards for a touchdown. It was his third straight postseason game with an interception. Chancellor also vaulted the Panthers' offensive line twice in attempt to block a field goal at the end of the half, though neither attempt counted due to penalties. In the NFC Championship against the Green Bay Packers, Chancellor had four tackles in the 28–22 overtime victory. In Super Bowl XLIX, Chancellor recorded 10 tackles as the Seahawks failed to repeat as Super Bowl champions. They fell to the New England Patriots 28–24. He was ranked 41st by his fellow players on the NFL Top 100 Players of 2015.

=== 2015 ===
One year into his five-year extension, Chancellor requested a new contract. As of September 14, 2015, there had been no new contract talks between Chancellor and the Seahawks. Chancellor missed the first two games of the 2015 NFL season, a 31–34 overtime loss to the St. Louis Rams and a 17–27 loss to the Green Bay Packers. Chancellor returned to the 0–2 Seahawks in Week 3. The Seahawks went 10–4 since Chancellor's return. For his play in the 2015 season, he earned a trip to the 2016 Pro Bowl.

In the Wild Card Round of the postseason for the 2015 season, Chancellor would force a fourth quarter fumble of running back Adrian Peterson in a game against the Minnesota Vikings. The Seahawks would recover, and ultimately kick a field goal on the subsequent drive, giving the Seahawks a 10–9 lead, which would end up being the final score of the game after Blair Walsh missed a potential game-winning field goal in the final seconds. The Seahawks went on to lose in the Divisional Round to the eventual NFC Champion Carolina Panthers by a score of 31–24. He was ranked 32nd by his fellow players on the NFL Top 100 Players of 2016.

=== 2016 ===
Starting the 2016 season, Chancellor was named defensive team captain for the second time in his career, joining Russell Wilson, Jon Ryan, and cornerback DeShawn Shead as the four Seahawk captains. Chancellor earned NFC Defensive Player of the Week for his performance against the New England Patriots.

In the 2016 season, Chancellor had 47 tackles and two interceptions. The Seahawks would return to the playoffs. In the Wild Card Round victory against the Detroit Lions, Chancellor had six tackles. In the Divisional Round loss to the Atlanta Falcons, Chancellor had six tackles for the second consecutive playoff game. After the season, he was ranked 34th by his fellow players on the NFL Top 100 Players of 2017.

=== 2017 ===
On August 1, 2017, Chancellor signed a three-year, $36 million contract extension with $25 million guaranteed with the Seahawks. On November 18, it was revealed that Chancellor would miss the rest of the season after suffering a neck injury in Week 10. He was officially placed on injured reserve on December 16, 2017. Despite missing the final six games of the season due to that injury, Chancellor was named a Pro Bowl alternate at safety. Had he been able to play in the game he would have received the honor. Despite only playing in nine games, he was still ranked 75th by his peers on the NFL Top 100 Players of 2018.

=== 2018 ===
In a series of tweets on July 1, 2018, Chancellor said that the neck injury he had suffered in 2017 had not healed enough to allow him to return for the 2018 season. Although he never used the word "retirement," he strongly hinted that it was unlikely he would ever be medically cleared to play again. "To walk away from the game by choice is one thing," he tweeted. "To walk away from the game because of the risk of paralysis is another." Even before then, Carroll had said that Chancellor would have difficulty playing football again due to the severity of the injury. He was placed on the team's physically unable to perform list on July 26, 2018.

Chancellor remained on the Seahawks roster as his contract called for him to get $6.8 million of guaranteed money in 2018 and a $5.2 million injury guarantee in 2019; he could have potentially forfeited the money had he formally retired. Chancellor had the honor of raising the 12th Man flag for the Seahawks 2018 home opener and later revealed that he had spinal stenosis and bone spurs in his neck. On May 9, 2019, the Seahawks terminated Chancellor's contract after he had failed a physical.

== NFL career statistics ==
Legend
	Won the Super Bowl
**Bold**	Career high

=== Regular season ===
Year	Team	GP	Tackles				Fumbles			Interceptions					
Year	Team	GP	Cmb	Solo	Ast	Sck	FF	FR	Yds	Int	Yds	Avg	Lng	TD	PD
2010	SEA	16	23	17	6	**1**	1	0	0	0	0	0.0	0	0	1
2011	SEA	15	97	**75**	22	**1**	**2**	1	0	**4**	27	6.8	9	0	**12**
2012	SEA	16	**101**	**75**	26	0	1	**2**	0	0	0	0.0	0	0	4
2013	SEA	16	99	65	34	0	1	0	0	3	**78**	26.0	32	0	**12**
2014	SEA	14	78	60	18	0	1	0	0	1	52	**52.0**	**52**	**1**	7
2015	SEA	11	74	44	30	0	1	0	0	2	6	3.0	6	0	4
2016	SEA	12	85	50	**35**	0	1	0	0	2	5	2.5	5	0	8
2017	SEA	9	49	34	15	0	1	0	0	0	0	0.0	0	0	2
2018	SEA	0	Did not play due to injury												
Career		109	606	420	186	2	11	3	0	12	258	21.5	52	1	44

=== Postseason ===
Year	Team	GP	Tackles				Fumbles			Interceptions					
Year	Team	GP	Cmb	Solo	Ast	Sck	FF	FR	Yds	Int	Yds	Avg	Lng	TD	PD
2010	SEA	2	0	0	0	0	0	0	0	0	0	0.0	0	0	1
2012	SEA	2	9	4	5	0	0	0	0	0	0	0.0	0	0	0
2013	SEA	3	**35**	15	**20**	0	0	0	0	**2**	2	1.0	2	0	**6**
2014	SEA	3	26	**20**	6	0	0	0	0	1	**90**	**90.0**	**90**	**1**	1
2015	SEA	2	9	5	4	0	**1**	0	0	0	0	0.0	0	0	1
2016	SEA	2	16	13	3	0	0	0	0	0	0	0.0	0	0	0
Career		14	95	57	38	0	1	0	0	3	92	30.7	90	1	9

== Personal life ==
Chancellor and his wife Tiffany have a son born in July 2019. As a child, Chancellor often visited the Boys and Girls club. Along with his wife, and under the Marc Nolan brand, Chancellor launched a line of luxury footwear called "the Chancellor Collection".

Chancellor's nephew KeAndre Lambert-Smith plays in the NFL as a wide receiver for the Los Angeles Chargers.
