= Christine Michael =

American football player (born 1990)

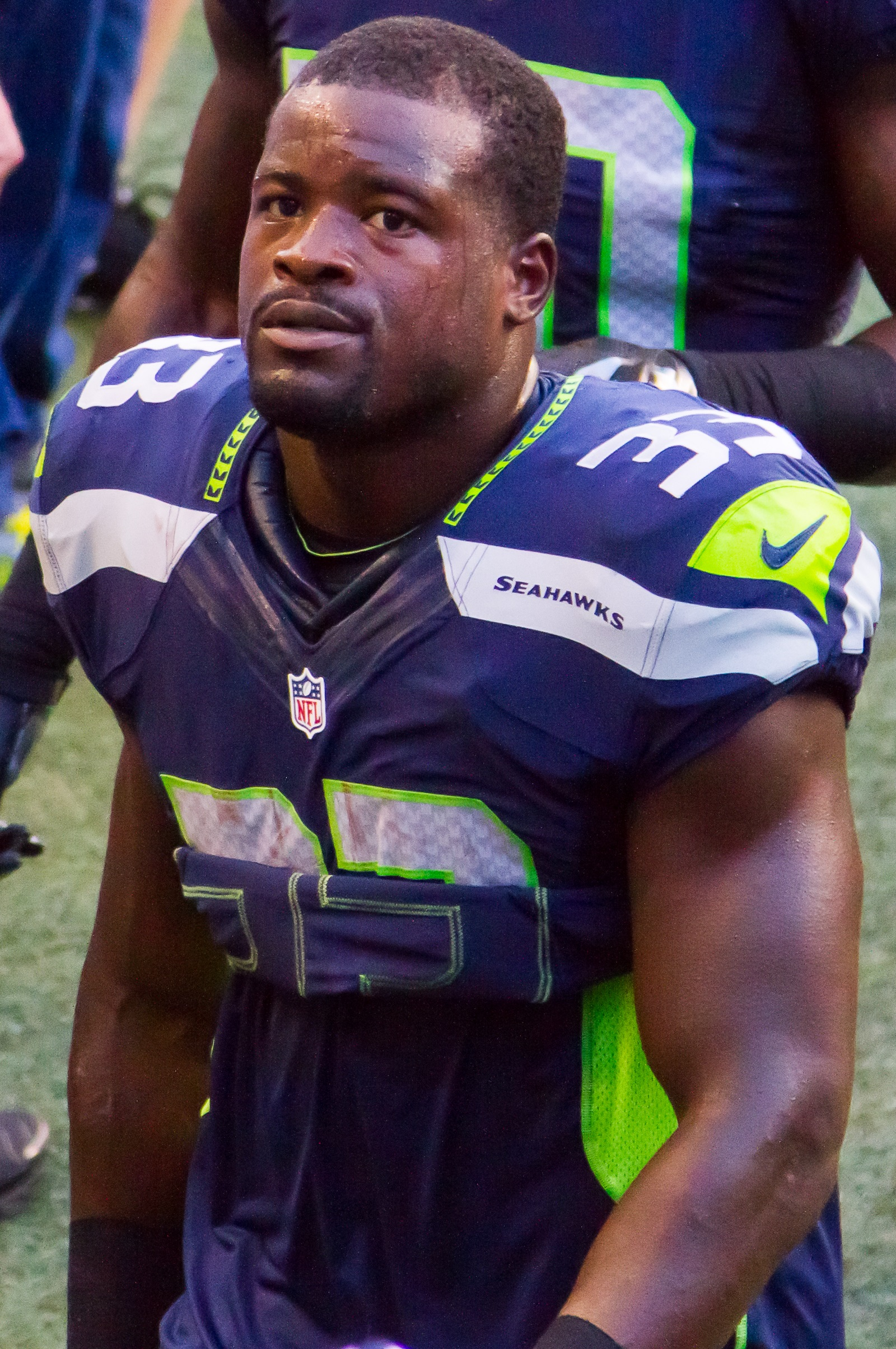
- Michael with the Seattle Seahawks in 2015

No. 33, 30, 32, 38
- Position: Running back

Personal information
- Born: November 9, 1990 (age 36); Beaumont, Texas, U.S.
- Listed height: 5 ft 10 in (1.78 m)
- Listed weight: 220 lb (100 kg)

Career information
- High school: West Brook (Beaumont)
- College: Texas A&M (2009–2012)
- NFL draft: 2013: 2nd round, 62nd overall pick

Career history
- Seattle Seahawks (2013–2014); Dallas Cowboys (2015); Washington Redskins (2015)*; Seattle Seahawks (2015–2016); Green Bay Packers (2016); Indianapolis Colts (2017–2018); St. Louis BattleHawks (2020)
- * Offseason or practice squad member only

Awards and highlights
- Super Bowl champion (XLVIII); Big 12 Offensive Freshman of the Year (2009)

Career NFL statistics
- Rushing yards: 1,089
- Rushing average: 4.3
- Rushing touchdowns: 7
- Receptions: 26
- Receiving yards: 135
- Receiving touchdowns: 1
- Stats at Pro Football Reference

Christine Lynn Michael Sr. (/ˈkrɪstɪn/; born November 9, 1990) is an American former professional football player who was a running back in the National Football League (NFL). He played college football for the Texas A&M Aggies and was selected by the Seattle Seahawks in the second round of the 2013 NFL draft.

== Early life ==
A native of Beaumont, Texas, Michael attended West Brook Senior High School in Beaumont and played high school football for the West Brook Bruins. He rushed for 4,234 yards on 501 carries. He was also named the District 21-5A Offensive MVP as a junior in 2007. He won the 2009 Walter Payton Trophy for the best high school football athlete. He participated in the 2009 U.S. Army All-American Bowl and was a finalist for the 2008 Hall Trophy for the best player in the nation.

Michael was also on the West Brook Senior High School track team, where he competed as a sprinter. He was timed at 11.02 seconds in the 100 meters as a junior. He was also a member of the 4 × 100m (42.00) and 4 × 200m (1:28.45) relay squads.

Considered a five-star recruit by Rivals.com, Michael was listed the third best running back prospect in the nation (behind Hall Trophy winner and fellow US Army All-American Bryce Brown and Alabama's Trent Richardson).

== College career ==
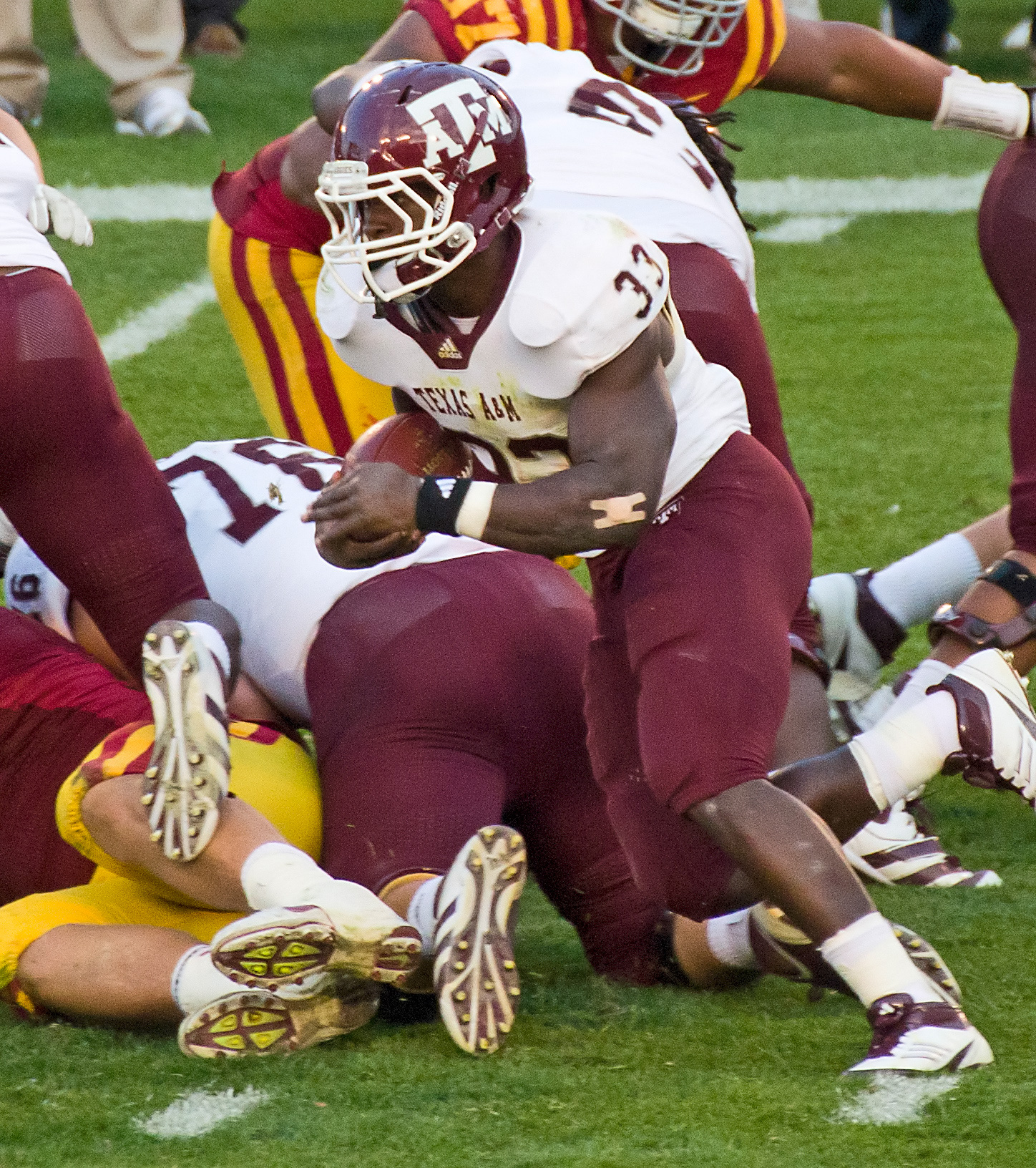
Michael with Texas A&M in 2011

Michael accepted an athletic scholarship to attend Texas A&M University, where he played for the Texas A&M Aggies football team from 2009 to 2012. In 2009, after posting 844 total rushing yards on 166 carries, Michael received Offensive Freshman of the Year honors from the Big 12 Conference.

Michael underwent season-ending surgery during the 2010 season due to a cracked right tibia. He compiled 631 total yards for four touchdowns.

== Professional career ==
Pre-draft measurables
Height	Weight	Arm length	Hand span	40-yard dash	10-yard split	20-yard split	20-yard shuttle	Three-cone drill	Vertical jump	Broad jump	Bench press	Wonderlic
5 ft 10 in (1.78 m)	220 lb (100 kg)	31 1/2 in (0.80 m)	9 3/8 in (0.24 m)	4.54 s	1.49 s	2.51 s	4.02 s	6.69 s	43 in (1.09 m)	10 ft 5 in (3.18 m)	27 reps	11
All values from NFL Combine

=== Seattle Seahawks (first stint) ===
Michael was selected in the second round (62nd overall) by the Seattle Seahawks in the 2013 NFL draft. During his first two seasons, Michael saw limited action as the third running back behind Pro-Bowl veteran Marshawn Lynch and backup Robert Turbin. The Seahawks won Super Bowl XLVIII over the Denver Broncos and made an appearance in Super Bowl XLIX against the New England Patriots during that time. Michael was traded to the Dallas Cowboys on September 6, 2015, after the Seahawks signed veteran Fred Jackson. In exchange for Michael, the Seahawks received a conditional seventh-round draft pick (number 225, Devin Lucien).

=== Dallas Cowboys ===
Michael was acquired to help improve their depth at running back with the departure of DeMarco Murray via free agency. After being inactive the first three weeks, it was rumored during the Cowboys bye week that the coaching staff would possibly name him the starter. Instead Michael played in five games as a backup. On November 17, 2015, he was waived to make room for former Seahawks teammate Robert Turbin.

=== Washington Redskins ===
On November 19, 2015, Michael was signed to the Washington Redskins practice squad. He was released by the team on December 15, 2015.

=== Seattle Seahawks (second stint) ===
On December 16, 2015, the Seahawks signed Michael after injuries to Marshawn Lynch and Thomas Rawls. In his first game back with the Seahawks, Michael rushed for a career-high 84 yards against the Cleveland Browns. Michael rushed a new career-high of 102 rushing yards, including a 45-yard run, against the Arizona Cardinals two weeks later.

Michael received his first start in a playoff game in Seattle's Wild Card match up against the Minnesota Vikings and finished the 10–9 victory with 70 rushing yards and 14 receiving yards.

On March 17, 2016, Michael signed a one-year contract with the Seattle Seahawks.

In Week 3 of the 2016 season, Michael had a then career game after rushing for 106 yards and two touchdowns against the San Francisco 49ers.

On November 15, 2016, the Seahawks released Michael, despite being their starting running back for seven games and leading the team in rushing yards and attempts. After much speculation, head coach Pete Carroll cited that his release was due to the return of Thomas Rawls and the emergence of rookie running back C. J. Prosise alongside Michael's significant reduction in effectiveness on the field.

=== Green Bay Packers ===
Michael was claimed off waivers by the Green Bay Packers on November 16, 2016.

On March 23, 2017, Michael re-signed with the Packers on a one-year deal worth $800,000. On May 1, 2017, Michael was released by the Packers after the team drafted three running backs in the 2017 NFL draft.

=== Indianapolis Colts ===
On June 1, 2017, Michael signed with the Indianapolis Colts. He was placed on injured reserve on June 15, 2017.

On March 21, 2018, Michael re-signed with the Colts. He was released on September 24, 2018.

=== St. Louis BattleHawks ===
In October 2019, Michael was drafted by the St. Louis BattleHawks in the 2020 XFL draft. In March, amid the COVID-19 pandemic, the league announced that it would be cancelling the rest of the season. Playing in all 5 games, he had 59 rushes for 178 yards and a touchdown. He had his contract terminated when the league suspended operations on April 10, 2020.

== NFL career statistics ==
=== Regular season ===
Season	Team	Games		Rushing					Receiving					Fumbles	
Season	Team	GP	GS	Att	Yds	Avg	Lng	TD	Rec	Yds	Avg	Lng	TD	Fum	Lost
2013	SEA	4	0	18	79	4.4	13	0	0	0	0	0	0	0	0
2014	SEA	10	0	34	175	5.1	45	0	1	12	12.0	12	0	1	0
2015	DAL/SEA	8	2	54	243	4.5	45	0	3	16	5.3	11	0	0	0
2016	SEA/GB	15	7	148	583	3.9	42	7	22	107	4.9	13	1	2	1
2018	IND	1	0	2	9	4.5	8	0	0	0	0	0	0	0	0
	Total	38	9	256	1,089	4.3	45	7	26	135	5.2	13	1	3	1
Source: NFL.com

=== Postseason ===
Season	Team	Games		Rushing					Receiving					Fumbles	
Season	Team	GP	GS	Att	Yds	Avg	Lng	TD	Rec	Yds	Avg	Lng	TD	Fum	Lost
2015	SEA	2	1	21	70	3.3	13	0	1	14	14.0	14	0	0	0
2016	GB	3	0	16	58	3.6	10	0	1	3	3.0	3	0	0	0
	Total	5	1	37	128	3.5	13	0	2	17	8.5	14	0	0	0
Source: pro-football-reference.com

== Personal life ==
Michael's first name, which is unusual for a male, is pronounced KRIS-tin /ˈkrɪstɪn/. His mother told him she wanted her first child to be a girl, so she chose the name before she knew the baby's gender; she likened the name to the character in the Johnny Cash song "A Boy Named Sue." In May 2016, he fathered a son named Christine Michael, Jr. and has since started wearing "Michael Sr." on the back of his practice and game jerseys.
