= Thomas Rawls =

American football player (born 1993)

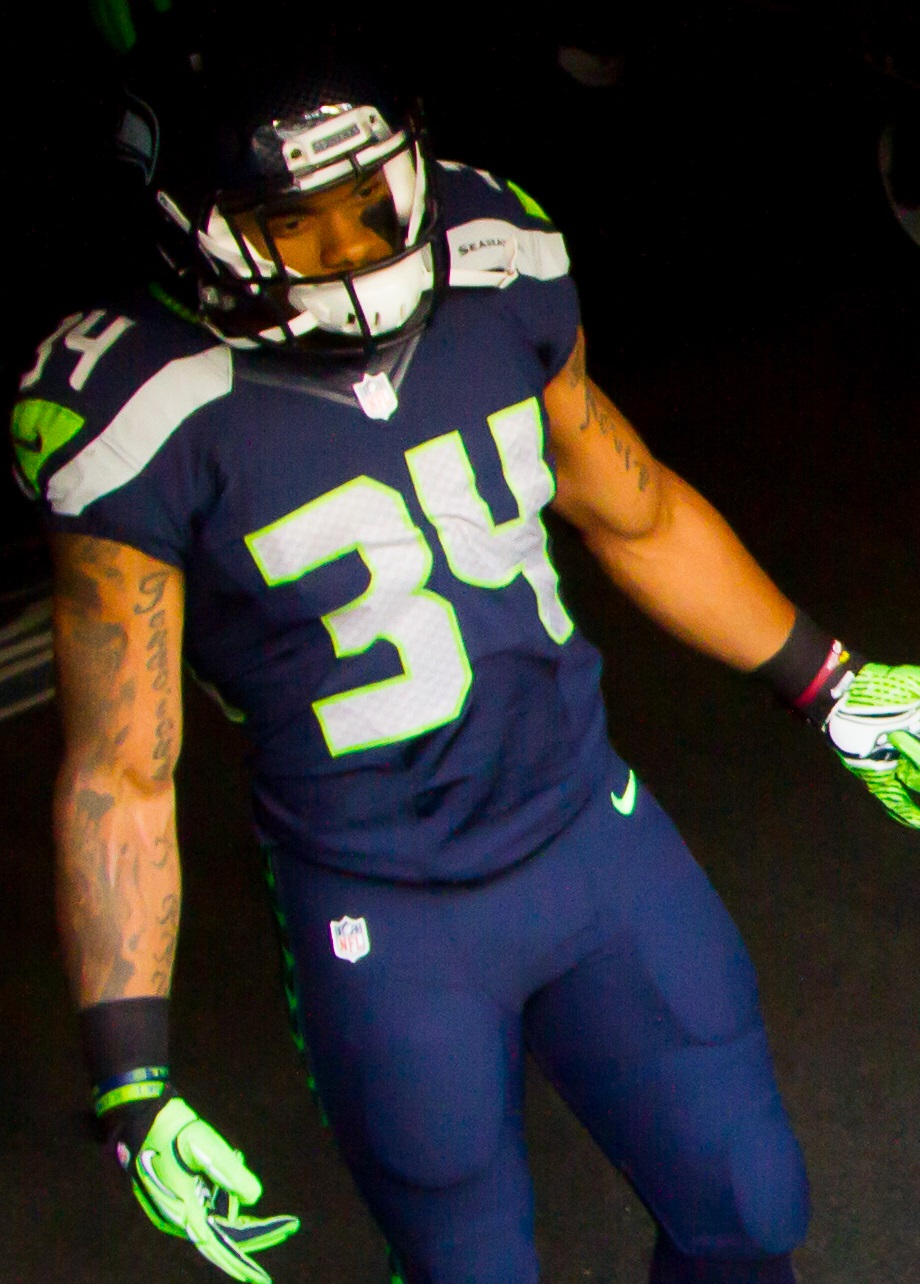
- Rawls with the Seattle Seahawks in 2015

No. 34, 31
- Position: Running back

Personal information
- Born: August 3, 1993 (age 33); Flint, Michigan, U.S.
- Listed height: 5 ft 9 in (1.75 m)
- Listed weight: 215 lb (98 kg)

Career information
- High school: Flint Northern (Flint)
- College: Michigan (2011–2013); Central Michigan (2014)
- NFL draft: 2015: undrafted

Career history
- Seattle Seahawks (2015–2017); New York Jets (2018)*; Cincinnati Bengals (2018); Jacksonville Jaguars (2019)*
- * Offseason or practice squad member only

Awards and highlights
- PFWA All-Rookie Team (2015); Second-team All-MAC (2014)

Career NFL statistics
- Rushing yards: 1,336
- Rushing average: 4.3
- Rushing touchdowns: 7
- Receptions: 31
- Receiving yards: 266
- Receiving touchdowns: 1
- Stats at Pro Football Reference

Thomas Tyrell Rawls (born August 3, 1993) is an American former professional football player who was a running back in the National Football League (NFL). He was signed by the Seattle Seahawks as an undrafted free agent in 2015. He played college football for the Michigan Wolverines and Central Michigan Chippewas. Rawls currently holds the Seahawks' record for the most single game rushing yards by a rookie running back (209) and the most rushing yards by an undrafted rookie in his first 6 games (711). He also holds the Seahawks' record for most yards in a postseason game (161), accomplished in the 2016–17 Wild Card Round against the Detroit Lions.

== Early life ==
Rawls graduated from Flint Northern High School in Flint, Michigan, where his coaches nicknamed him "The Train". As a running back, he averaged more than 10 yards per carry, totaling 1,585 yards on 150 carries with 19 touchdowns in his senior season. He rushed for a record 458 yards and eight touchdowns against Bay City Western, breaking a Flint record set by Heisman Trophy winner, Mark Ingram II. He was a unanimous All-State selection, was named Most Valuable Player in the Saginaw Valley League, Player of the Year on The Flint Journal's All-Area Team, he had offers from University of Michigan, Central Michigan, Toledo and Cincinnati Rawls also lettered in track & field at Flint Northern; at the 2010 Regional Meet, he placed second in the 100-meter dash with a time of 10.8 seconds. He posted a personal-best time of 10.7 seconds in the 100-meter dash and ran the 40-yard dash in 4.50 seconds as a senior.

== College career ==
=== Michigan ===
Rawls committed to the University of Michigan on February 1, 2011. In announcing his commitment, Rawls said he hoped to break Mike Hart's rushing records at Michigan: "Mike Hart, he was my favorite player. Honestly, I want to play early like he did. I want to play as a true freshman running back. I know I am going to make an impact. Also, Mike Hart holds a lot of records at Michigan, and with all due respect to Mike, I want to shatter those records."

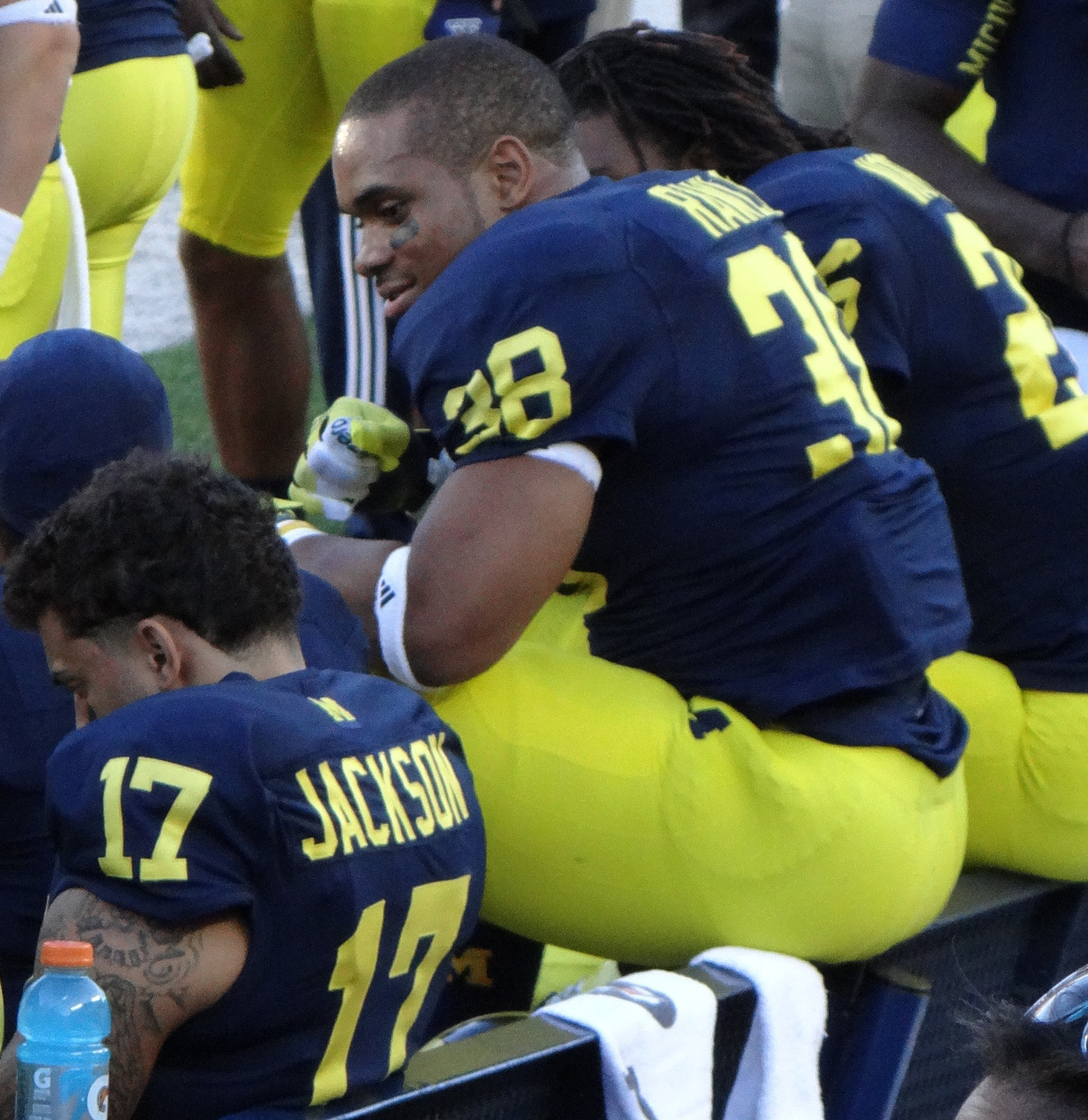
Rawls with Michigan in October 2012

As a freshman, he appeared in 10 games for the Michigan football team and had a season-high 73 rushing yards against Minnesota on October 1, 2011. After a good showing in his freshman season, Rawls was picked by Michael Rothstein of ESPN.com as one of five Michigan players likely to surprise in 2012. However, Rawls's playing time was minimal in both the 2012 and 2013 seasons, having only three carries in the entire 2013 season.

=== Central Michigan ===
In January 2014, it was announced that Rawls was transferring to Central Michigan University to play his senior season for the Chippewas. On September 6, 2014, Rawls rushed for 155 yards and two touchdowns in Central Michigan's 38–17 victory over Purdue. After the game, Rawls told reporters, "I felt like the game was on me. I want that pressure. It excites me and boosts me to run even harder. The coaching staff put their trust in me."

On September 13, 2014, Rawls was held out of a game against the Syracuse Orange for unknown reasons but Rawls had a career game upon his return. He ran the ball 40 times for 229 yards against Ohio, then another 40 times against Northern Illinois for a career-high 270 yards. The Chippewas' offense was centered around Rawls to set up the passing attack. Rawls finished the season with 1,103 rushing yards and 10 touchdowns, despite playing in seven of the team's 13 games due to suspension and injury. Rawls was viewed as a late-round draft pick going into the 2015 NFL draft.

== Professional career ==
Pre-draft measurables
Height	Weight	Arm length	Hand span	Wingspan	40-yard dash	10-yard split	20-yard split	20-yard shuttle	Three-cone drill	Vertical jump	Broad jump	Bench press
5 ft 9 in (1.75 m)	215 lb (98 kg)	30 3/4 in (0.78 m)	9 1/2 in (0.24 m)	6 ft 1 7/8 in (1.88 m)	4.46 s	1.63 s	2.62 s	4.37 s	7.10 s	35.5 in (0.90 m)	9 ft 8 in (2.95 m)	15 reps
All values from NFL Combine and Pro Day

=== Seattle Seahawks ===
==== 2015 season ====
After going undrafted in the 2015 NFL draft, Rawls signed with the Seattle Seahawks on May 2, 2015. He was behind Robert Turbin and Christine Michael on the depth chart, but after the Seahawks traded Michael to the Dallas Cowboys and Turbin suffered an injury and was subsequently waived from the team, Rawls made his way onto the roster. He began as a backup along with Fred Jackson to starter Marshawn Lynch and saw his first game action in the season opener for Seattle against the St. Louis Rams. Lynch underwent surgery later in the season, moving Rawls to a starting role.

On September 27, 2015, Rawls saw his first meaningful playing time in a game, rushing for 104 yards in relief of an injured Lynch. It was the first time any Seattle running back beside Lynch had gained 100 yards since 2012.

Continuing to fill-in for the injured Lynch, Rawls rushed for 169 yards on October 11, 2015, including a 69-yard touchdown run in a game against the undefeated Cincinnati Bengals. However, the Seahawks would give up a 17-point fourth quarter lead to lose the game, curiously not using Rawls once during overtime.

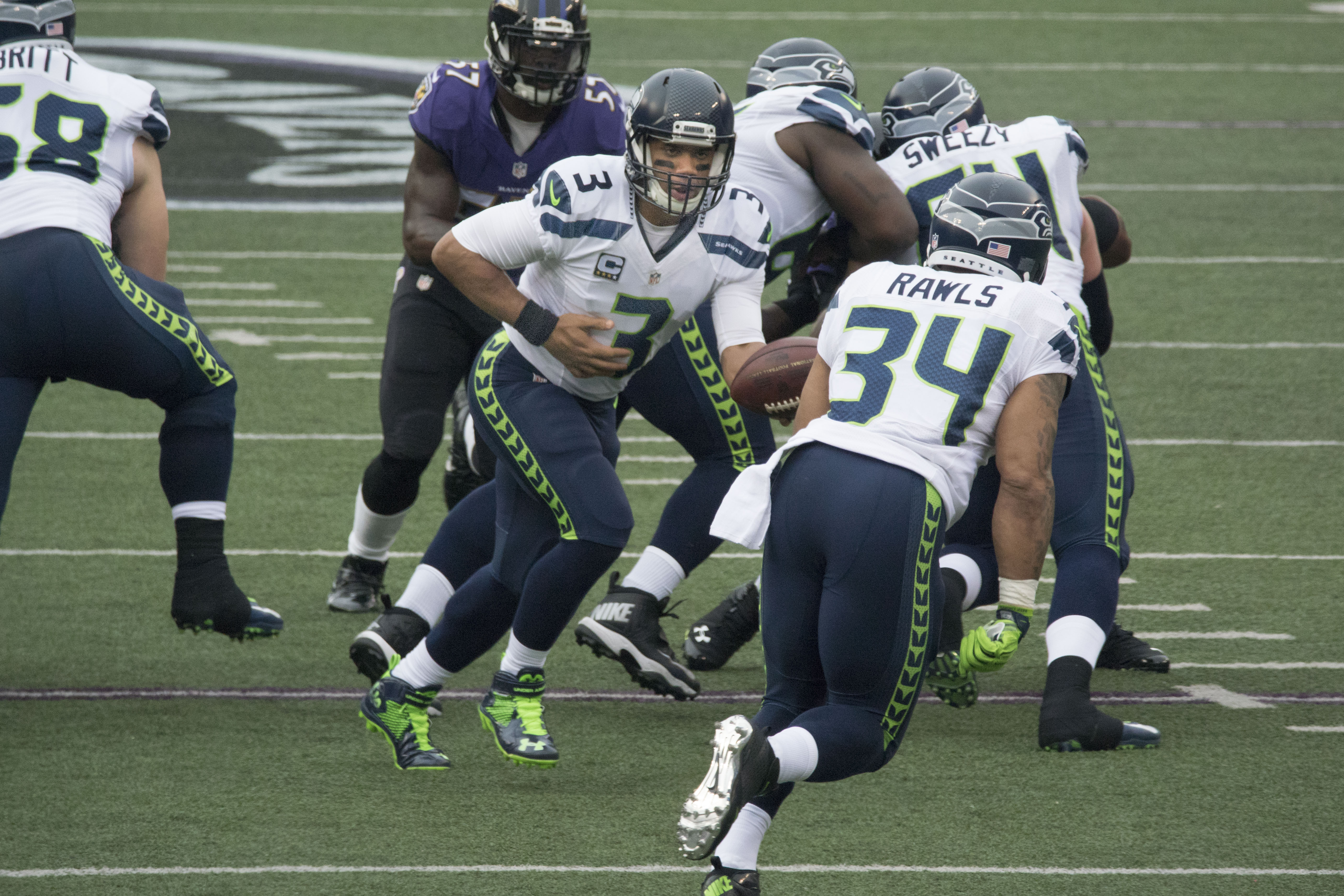
Rawls (#34) with the Seahawks in 2015

With Lynch again sidelined with an abdomen injury, Rawls started his third career game, this time against the Seahawks' division rival San Francisco 49ers, on November 22, 2015. He ran for 209 yards on 30 carries and had 255 total yards and 2 touchdowns, the first time a Seahawk eclipsed 200 rushing yards since former NFL MVP Shaun Alexander in 2006. At this point in the season, Rawls had run for three 100-yard games, while incumbent starter Marshawn Lynch had run for over 75 yards only once.

On November 22, 2015, Rawls broke the Seahawks franchise rookie record for rushing yards (209). Rawls also made NFL history as the first player with 250-plus scrimmage yards, a rushing touchdown and a receiving touchdown in the same game. Rawls continued his breakout campaign with touchdowns against the Pittsburgh Steelers and Minnesota Vikings in Weeks 12 and 13, respectively. With the performance vs the Vikings earning Rawls the Pepsi NFL Rookie of the Week honors.

On December 13, 2015, Rawls' successful rookie season was cut short after suffering a fractured ankle on the Seahawks opening drive against the Baltimore Ravens that forced Rawls to be out for the season. Rawls had 6 carries for 44 yards before he was injured. Rawls had 147 carries for 830 yards and 4 rushing touchdowns and 1 receiving touchdown in his successful rookie season. On December 15, 2015, Rawls was placed on Injured Reserve. He was voted to be in the PFWA All-Rookie Team (2015).

==== 2016 season ====
In Week 2, Rawls left the game after suffering a fractured fibula and finished the loss with 7 rushing attempts for −7 yards against the Los Angeles Rams. He helped win a game on Sunday, December 4 against the Carolina Panthers, as the Seahawks manhandled the Panthers with a final score of 40–7. He finished the 2016 regular season with 349 rushing yards and three rushing touchdowns. He holds the Seahawks' record for most yards in a postseason game (161), accomplished on January 7, 2017, versus the Detroit Lions in the Wild Card Round in the 26–6 victory.

==== 2017 season ====
Rawls regressed for the second straight season in 2017. The Seahawks as a whole suffered through one of the least efficient offensive line units and an inconsistent backfield. He finished the season with 157 rushing yards on 58 carries to go along with nine receptions for 94 yards.

=== New York Jets ===
On March 30, 2018, Rawls signed with the New York Jets. He was released by the Jets as a part of final roster cuts on September 1.

=== Cincinnati Bengals ===
On September 19, 2018, Rawls was signed by the Cincinnati Bengals. He was released by the Bengals on October 9. Rawls appeared in one game for the Bengals in the 2018 season.

=== Jacksonville Jaguars ===
On January 9, 2019, Rawls signed a futures contract with the Jacksonville Jaguars. He was released by the Jaguars during final roster cuts on August 30.

== Personal life ==
Rawls was arrested in the spring of 2014 for an April 8 incident in which he and two companions were charged with stealing a 62-year-old woman's purse from a casino. His arrest led to his indefinite suspension from Central Michigan University's football team. He was reinstated a week later, after accepting a plea deal and missing two games. In October 2014, Rawls pled guilty to a misdemeanor charge of attempted larceny and was sentenced to a year's probation and 104 hours of community service. He later publicly denied his guilt, declining to further elaborate.

In 2023, he shared that he is married with a son.
