= Will Tukuafu =

American football player (born 1984)

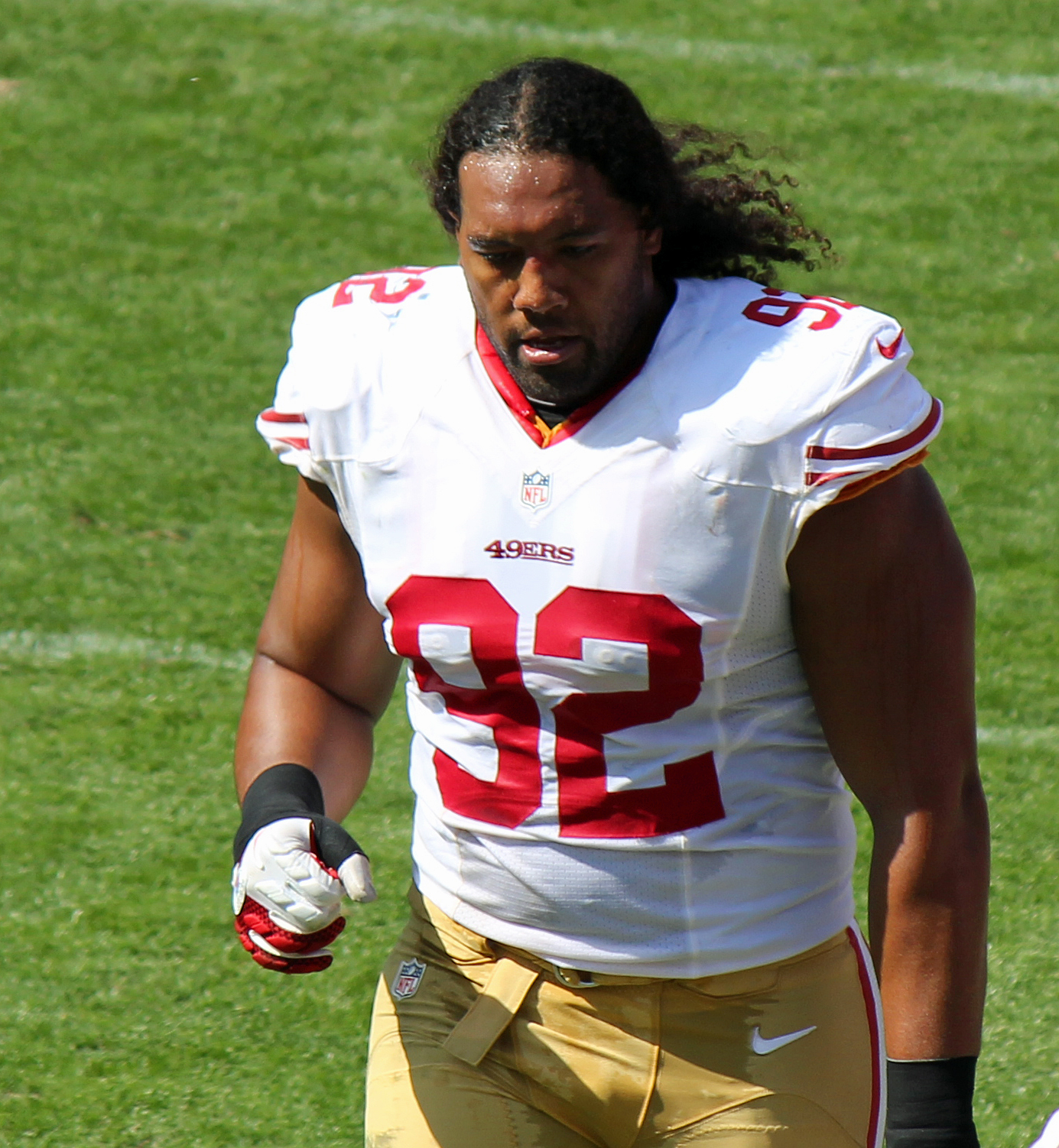
- Tukuafu with the San Francisco 49ers in 2012

Personal information
- Born: January 3, 1984 (age 42); Salt Lake City, Utah, U.S.
- Listed height: 6 ft 2 in (1.88 m)
- Listed weight: 280 lb (127 kg)

Career information
- Positions: Nose tackle and fullback (No. 92, 48, 46)
- High school: Salt Lake City (UT) East
- College: Oregon
- NFL draft: 2010: undrafted

Career history

Playing
- Seattle Seahawks (2010); San Francisco 49ers (2010–2014); Seattle Seahawks (2014–2016)

Coaching
- Seattle Seahawks (2022–2023) Defensive quality control coach; Los Angeles Chargers (2024) Assistant defensive line coach

Awards and highlights
- Second-team All-Pac-10 (2009)

Career NFL statistics
- Rushing yards: 5
- Rushing touchdowns: 1
- Receptions: 2
- Receiving yards: 11
- Receiving touchdowns: 1
- Stats at Pro Football Reference

William T. Tukuafu (born January 3, 1984) is an American football coach and former fullback. He was signed by the Seattle Seahawks as an undrafted free agent originally in 2010. He also played for the San Francisco 49ers.

Tukuafu was born in Salt Lake City, Utah. He graduated from East High School, attended Scottsdale Community College in Scottsdale, Arizona, then transferred to the University of Oregon.

== College career ==
Tukuafu played in 39 games (37 starts) for the Ducks, registering 131 tackles, 32.5 tackles-for-loss, 14.5 sacks, four forced fumbles, five fumble recoveries, and four passes defensed. As a senior, he was named Second-team All-Pac-10 by the coaches. He also earned Oregon's Schaffeld Award and the Gonyea Award.

== Professional career ==
Pre-draft measurables
Height	Weight	40-yard dash	10-yard split	20-yard split	20-yard shuttle	Three-cone drill	Vertical jump	Broad jump	Bench press
6 ft 2 5/8 in (1.90 m)	266 lb (121 kg)	5.00 s	1.66 s	2.85 s	4.50 s	7.28 s	32.0 in (0.81 m)	9 ft 5 in (2.87 m)	25 reps
All values from Pro Day

=== Seattle Seahawks ===
Tukuafu was signed by the Seattle Seahawks as an undrafted free agent on June 8, 2010, and was released on June 22.

=== San Francisco 49ers ===
Tukuafu was signed by the San Francisco 49ers on August 12, 2010. He was released on September 3, and was re-signed to the practice squad two days later. Tukuafu was promoted to the 49ers' active roster on December 18.

Tukuafu made NFL debut and recorded his first career fumble recovery on his first career play from scrimmage against the Seattle Seahawks on September 11, 2011. During his tenure in San Francisco, he saw action in 20 games from 2011 to 2013 and additionally six career playoff appearances (including two starts). Tukuafu's versatility allowed him to play fullback, defensive line, and on special teams.

At the end of the 2012 season, Tukuafu and the 49ers appeared in Super Bowl XLVII. He appeared in the game on offense, defense, and special teams, but the 49ers fell to the Baltimore Ravens by a score of 34–31.

=== Seattle Seahawks (second stint) ===
Tukuafu was signed by the Seattle Seahawks on October 29, 2014. He was released on September 3, 2016, and re-signed again on September 13, only to be released again the following week. On October 26, Tukuafu was re-signed by the Seahawks. He was placed on injured reserve on December 13, after suffering a concussion in Week 13.
