= 2014 Seattle Seahawks season =

American football team season

- Owner: Paul Allen
- General manager: John Schneider
- Head coach: Pete Carroll
- Offensive coordinator: Darrell Bevell
- Defensive coordinator: Dan Quinn
- Home stadium: CenturyLink Field

Results
- Record: 12–4
- Division place: 1st NFC West
- Playoffs: Won Divisional Playoffs (vs. Panthers) 31–17; Won NFC Championship (vs. Packers) 28–22 (OT); Lost Super Bowl XLIX (vs. Patriots) 24–28
- All-Pros: 5: MLB Bobby Wagner (1st team); CB Richard Sherman (1st team); S Earl Thomas (1st team); RB Marshawn Lynch (2nd team); S Kam Chancellor (2nd team)
- Pro Bowlers: 6: Selected but did not participate due to participation in Super Bowl XLIX: QB Russell Wilson; RB Marshawn Lynch; MLB Bobby Wagner; CB Richard Sherman; FS Earl Thomas; SS Kam Chancellor

Uniform
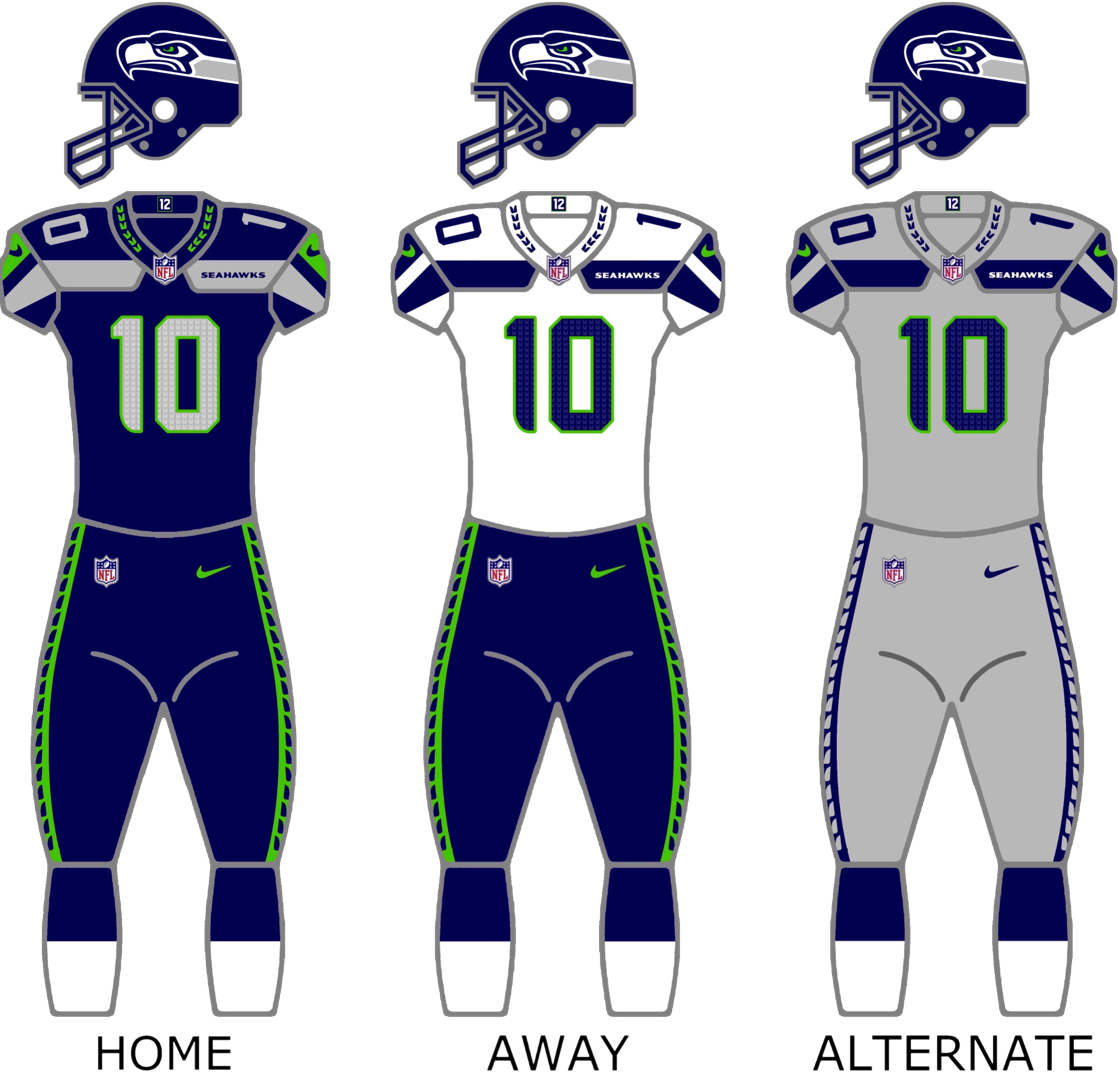

The 2014 season was the Seattle Seahawks' 39th in the National Football League (NFL) and their fifth under head coach Pete Carroll. The Seahawks started the season as the defending Super Bowl champions for the first time in franchise history.

The season began with a 36–16 victory over the Green Bay Packers in their first meeting since the controversial Fail Mary Game. After struggling to a 3–3 record, which included a rare home loss to the Dallas Cowboys, they went on a 9–1 run to finish the season, which included a sweep of their division rivals, the Arizona Cardinals, who battled with them the whole season. They repeated as NFC West champions and finished in a three-way tie with the Packers and Cowboys for the NFC's best record, but they earned the No. 1 seed based on intra-conference tiebreaker, securing home-field advantage for the second consecutive season. Not only are they first defending Super Bowl champion to do so since the 1990 San Francisco 49ers, but also the first NFC team to repeat as the No. 1 seed in the conference since the 2004 Philadelphia Eagles, and the first team to do so since the 2013 Denver Broncos.

The Seahawks fielded the #1 rushing attack in the league with Marshawn Lynch finishing the year with 1,306 yards and a league-leading 13 rushing touchdowns. In addition to Lynch, Russell Wilson had one of the most prolific running quarterback seasons ever with a career high 849 rushing yards and 6 rushing touchdowns along with a league-leading 7.2 yards per attempt.

The Seahawks opened the playoffs with a win over the Carolina Panthers in the Divisional round, becoming the first defending champion since the 2005 New England Patriots to win a playoff game the following season. In one of the greatest comebacks in NFL history, the Seahawks advanced to Super Bowl XLIX by defeating the Green Bay Packers 28–22 in overtime after trailing 16–0 at halftime and 19–7 with less than three minutes left in regulation. In doing so, they became the first team since the 2004 New England Patriots to repeat as conference champions, the first NFC team since the 1997 Green Bay Packers to repeat as NFC Champions, the first team to go to consecutive Super Bowls as the No. 1 seed in the playoffs since the 1990–1991 Buffalo Bills, and the first NFC team to go to consecutive Super Bowls as the No. 1 seed in the playoffs since the 1982–1983 Washington Redskins. In Super Bowl XLIX, the Seahawks were defeated by the New England Patriots 28–24, thereby being dethroned and failed to become the first back-to-back champion since the 2004 New England Patriots, as well as the first NFC team to do so since the 1993 Dallas Cowboys. This was also the first time head coach Pete Carroll met his former team, the Patriots, and his successor, Bill Belichick in the Super Bowl, as Carroll was the Patriots head coach from 1997 to 1999, the last head coach before Belichick was hired in 2000.

This was also the most recent time that the Seahawks acquired the number one seed in the NFC until 2025 (where they eventually won the Super Bowl by successfully revenging the Patriots that they lost to them). It also currently remains the latest season where a team in the NFC repeated as conference champions from the previous season.

== Roster changes ==
=== Free agents ===
Position	Player	Tag	2014 Team	Notes
CB	Brandon Browner	UFA	New England Patriots	Signed 3 year/$16.8 million deal
WR	Arceto Clark	UFA	Seattle Seahawks	Signed 2 year/$930 thousand deal
TE	Kellen Davis	UFA	Detroit Lions	Signed 1 year/$730 thousand deal
OT	Breno Giacomini	UFA	New York Jets	Signed 4 year/$18 million deal
K	Steven Hauschka	UFA	Seattle Seahawks	Signed 3 year/$12.15 million deal
QB	Tarvaris Jackson	UFA	Seattle Seahawks	Signed 1 year/$1.25 million deal
S	Chris Maragos	UFA	Philadelphia Eagles	Signed 3 year/$4 million deal
DT	Clinton McDonald	UFA	Tampa Bay Buccaneers	Signed 4 year/$12 million deal
G	Paul McQuistan	UFA	Cleveland Browns	Signed 2 year/$3 million deal
WR	Sidney Rice	UFA	Retired	
FB	Michael Robinson	NONE	Retired	
WR	Golden Tate	UFA	Detroit Lions	Signed 5 year/$31 million deal
CB	Walter Thurmond	UFA	New York Giants	Signed 1 year/$3 million deal
WR	Bryan Walters	UFA	Seattle Seahawks	Signed 1 year/$570 thousand deal

== Draft ==
2014 Seattle Seahawks draft
Round	Pick	Player	Position	College	Notes
2	45	Paul Richardson	WR	Colorado	Pick from DET^{[b]}
2	64	Justin Britt	OT	Missouri	
4	108	Cassius Marsh	DE	UCLA	Pick from MIN^{[a]}
4	123	Kevin Norwood	WR	Alabama	Pick from CIN^{[d]}
4	132	Kevin Pierre-Louis	OLB	Boston College	
5	172	Jimmy Staten	DT	Middle Tennessee St	
6	199	Garrett Scott	OT	Marshall	Pick from CIN^{[d]}
6	208	Eric Pinkins	S	San Diego St	
7	227	Kiero Small	FB	Arkansas	Pick from DET^{[b]}
Made roster † Pro Football Hall of Fame * Made at least one Pro Bowl during career

Notes

^{^[a]} The Seahawks traded their first-round selection (No. 32 overall) to Minnesota in exchange for their second- and fourth-round selection (Nos. 40 and 108 overall).
^{^[a]} The Seahawks traded the second-round selection (No. 40 overall) that they received from Minnesota, and their fifth-round selection (No. 146 overall) to Detroit in exchange for their second-, fourth-, and seventh-round selection (Nos. 45, 111, and 227 overall).
^{^[c]} The Seahawks traded their third-round selection (No. 96 overall), along with their 2013 first- and seventh-round selections to the Minnesota Vikings in exchange for wide receiver Percy Harvin.
^{^[d]} The Seahawks traded the fourth-round selection (No. 111 overall) that they received from Detroit, to Cincinnati in exchange for their fourth- and sixth-round selection (Nos. 123 and 199 overall).
^{^[e]} The Seahawks acquired an additional fifth-round selection (No. 146 overall) in a trade that sent quarterback Matt Flynn to the Oakland Raiders.
^{^[f]} The Seahawks traded their seventh-round selection (No. 247 overall) to the Oakland Raiders in exchange for quarterback Terrelle Pryor.

=== Undrafted free agents ===
Position	Player	College
S	Dion Bailey	USC
LB	Brock Coyle	Montana
TE	Chase Dixon	UCA
OT	Garry Gilliam	Penn State
OG	Bronson Irwin	Oklahoma
DE	Jackson Jeffcoat	Texas
CB	Jimmy Legree	South Carolina
DT	Andru Pulu	EWU

== Personnel ==
=== Staff / Coaches ===
2014 Seattle Seahawks staff
**Front office**: Chairman – Paul Allen; President – Peter McLoughlin; Executive vice president/general manager – John Schneider; Senior vice president of football administration – Matt Thomas; Director of Team Operations– Tag Ribary; Director of college scouting – Scott Fitterer; Director of pro personnel – Trent Kirchner; Assistant director of pro personnel – Dan Morgan; Director of football communications – Lane Gammel; **Head coaches**: Executive vice president of football operations/head coach – Pete Carroll; Assistant head coach/offensive line – Tom Cable; **Offensive coaches**: Offensive coordinator – Darrell Bevell; Quarterbacks – Carl Smith; Running backs – Sherman Smith; Wide receivers – Kippy Brown; Assistant wide receivers – Nate Carroll; Tight ends – Pat McPherson; Assistant offensive line – Chris Morgan; Assistant offensive line – Pat Ruel; Offensive assistant – Will Harriger; Offensive quality control/assistant quarterbacks – Dave Canales; Quality control/offense – Keith Carter	**Defensive coaches**: Defensive coordinator – Dan Quinn; Pass game coordinator – Rocky Seto; Defensive line – Travis Jones; Linebackers – Ken Norton, Jr.; Defensive backs – Kris Richard; Defensive assistant – Marquand Manuel; **Special teams coaches**: Special teams coordinator – Brian Schneider; Assistant special teams – Chad Morton; Assistant special teams – Nick Sorensen; **Strength and conditioning**: Head strength and conditioning – Chris Carlisle; Assistant strength and conditioning – Mondray Gee; Assistant strength and conditioning – Jamie Yancher

=== Final roster ===
2014 Seattle Seahawks roster
**Quarterbacks (QB)**: **3** Russell Wilson; 7 Tarvaris Jackson; **Running backs (RB)**: **24** Marshawn Lynch; 33 Christine Michael; 22 Robert Turbin; 46 Will Tukuafu FB; **Wide receivers (WR)**: **89** Doug Baldwin; **15** Jermaine Kearse; 83 Ricardo Lockette; 13 Chris Matthews; 81 Kevin Norwood; **10** Paul Richardson; 19 Bryan Walters; **Tight ends (TE)**: 84 Cooper Helfet; 88 Tony Moeaki; **82** Luke Willson	**Offensive linemen (OL)**: 78 Alvin Bailey G/T; **68** Justin Britt T; **77** James Carpenter G; 79 Garry Gilliam T; 61 Lemuel Jeanpierre C; 65 Patrick Lewis C; 66 Keavon Milton T; **76** Russell Okung T; **64** J. R. Sweezy G/C; **60** Max Unger C; **Defensive linemen (DL)**: **56** Cliff Avril DE; **72** Michael Bennett DE; 95 Demarcus Dobbs DE; 97 Jordan Hill DT; 70 David King DE; **99** Tony McDaniel DT; 93 O'Brien Schofield DE; 94 Kevin Williams DT	**Linebackers (LB)**: 52 Brock Coyle MLB; **51** Bruce Irvin OLB; 57 Mike Morgan OLB; 53 Malcolm Smith OLB; **54** Bobby Wagner MLB; **50** K. J. Wright OLB; **Defensive backs (DB)**: 28 Marcus Burley CB; **31** Kam Chancellor SS; 23 Jeron Johnson SS; 20 Jeremy Lane CB; **41** Byron Maxwell CB; 35 DeShawn Shead CB; **25** Richard Sherman CB; 27 Tharold Simon CB; **29** Earl Thomas FS; **Special teams (ST)**: 49 Clint Gresham LS; 4 Stephen Hauschka K; 9 Jon Ryan P	**Practice squad**: 87 RaShaun Allen TE; 37 Dion Bailey S; 59 Allen Bradford LB; 30 Demitrius Bronson RB (IR); 5 B. J. Daniels QB; 69 Nate Isles G; 16 Douglas McNeil WR; 62 Drew Nowak G; 44 Ryan Robinson DE; 67 Jimmy Staten DT; 26 Steven Terrell S; 74 Julius Warmsley DE (IR); **Reserve**: 40 Derrick Coleman FB (IR); 55 Heath Farwell MLB (IR); 6 David Gilreath WR (IR); 91 Cassius Marsh DE (IR); 85 Anthony McCoy TE (IR); **92** Brandon Mebane DT (IR); 86 Zach Miller TE (IR); 58 Kevin Pierre-Louis OLB (IR); 39 Eric Pinkins S (NF-Inj.); 63 Stephen Schilling G (IR); 75 Garrett Scott T (NF-Ill.); 98 Greg Scruggs DE (IR); 75 D'Anthony Smith DT (IR); 46 Mike Taylor LB (IR); 90 Jesse Williams DT (IR); Rookies in italics 52 active, 17 reserve, 10 practice squad

- Starters in bold.

== Schedule ==
=== Preseason ===
Week	Date	Opponent	Result	Record	Venue	Attendance	Recap
1	August 7	at Denver Broncos	**L** 16–21	0–1	Sports Authority Field at Mile High	75,593	Recap
2	August 15	San Diego Chargers	**W** 41–14	1–1	CenturyLink Field	67,615	Recap
3	August 22	Chicago Bears	**W** 34–6	2–1	CenturyLink Field	67,608	Recap
4	August 28	at Oakland Raiders	**L** 31–41	2–2	O.co Coliseum	50,831	Recap

=== Regular season ===
Divisional matchups: the NFC West played the NFC East and the AFC West.

Week	Date	Opponent	Result	Record	Venue	Attendance	Recap
1	September 4	Green Bay Packers	**W** 36–16	1–0	CenturyLink Field	68,424	Recap
2	September 14	at San Diego Chargers	**L** 21–30	1–1	Qualcomm Stadium	67,916	Recap
3	September 21	Denver Broncos	**W** 26–20 (OT)	2–1	CenturyLink Field	68,447	Recap
4	Bye						
5	October 6	at Washington Redskins	**W** 27–17	3–1	FedExField	79,522	Recap
6	October 12	Dallas Cowboys	**L** 23–30	3–2	CenturyLink Field	68,432	Recap
7	October 19	at **St. Louis Rams**	**L** 26–28	3–3	Edward Jones Dome	57,855	Recap
8	October 26	at Carolina Panthers	**W** 13–9	4–3	Bank of America Stadium	74,042	Recap
9	November 2	Oakland Raiders	**W** 30–24	5–3	CenturyLink Field	68,337	Recap
10	November 9	New York Giants	**W** 38–17	6–3	CenturyLink Field	68,352	Recap
11	November 16	at Kansas City Chiefs	**L** 20–24	6–4	Arrowhead Stadium	76,463	Recap
12	November 23	**Arizona Cardinals**	**W** 19–3	7–4	CenturyLink Field	68,327	Recap
13	November 27	at **San Francisco 49ers**	**W** 19–3	8–4	Levi's Stadium	70,799	Recap
14	December 7	at Philadelphia Eagles	**W** 24–14	9–4	Lincoln Financial Field	69,596	Recap
15	December 14	**San Francisco 49ers**	**W** 17–7	10–4	CenturyLink Field	68,526	Recap
16	December 21	at **Arizona Cardinals**	**W** 35–6	11–4	University of Phoenix Stadium	63,806	Recap
17	December 28	**St. Louis Rams**	**W** 20–6	12–4	CenturyLink Field	68,453	Recap

Bold indicates division opponents.
Source: 2014 NFL season results

=== Postseason ===
Round	Date	Opponent (seed)	Result	Record	Venue	Attendance	Recap
Wild Card	First-round bye						
Divisional	January 10, 2015	Carolina Panthers (4)	**W** 31–17	1–0	CenturyLink Field	68,524	Recap
NFC Championship	January 18, 2015	Green Bay Packers (2)	**W** 28–22 (OT)	2–0	CenturyLink Field	68,538	Recap
Super Bowl XLIX	February 1, 2015	vs. New England Patriots (A1)	**L** 24–28	2–1	University of Phoenix Stadium	70,288	Recap

== Standings ==
=== Division ===
NFC West
	W	L	T	PCT	DIV	CONF	PF	PA	STK
^{(1)} Seattle Seahawks	12	4	0	.750	5–1	10–2	394	254	W6
^{(5)} Arizona Cardinals	11	5	0	.688	3–3	8–4	310	299	L2
San Francisco 49ers	8	8	0	.500	2–4	7–5	306	340	W1
St. Louis Rams	6	10	0	.375	2–4	4–8	324	354	L3

=== Conference ===
NFC
#	Team	Division	W	L	T	PCT	DIV	CONF	SOS	SOV	STK
Division leaders
1 (Note: Seattle, Green Bay and Dallas were ranked in seeds 1–3 based on conference record.)	Seattle Seahawks	West	12	4	0	.750	5–1	10–2	.525	.513	W6
2	Green Bay Packers	North	12	4	0	.750	5–1	9–3	.482	.440	W2
3	Dallas Cowboys	East	12	4	0	.750	4–2	8–4	.445	.422	W4
4	Carolina Panthers	South	7	8	1	.469	4–2	6–6	.490	.357	W4
Wild Cards
5 (Note: Arizona defeated Detroit head-to-head (Week 11, 14–6).)	Arizona Cardinals	West	11	5	0	.688	3–3	8–4	.523	.477	L2
6	Detroit Lions	North	11	5	0	.688	5–1	9–3	.471	.392	L1
Did not qualify for the postseason
7	Philadelphia Eagles	East	10	6	0	.625	4–2	6–6	.490	.416	W1
8	San Francisco 49ers	West	8	8	0	.500	2–4	7–5	.527	.508	W1
9 (Note: New Orleans defeated Minnesota head-to-head (Week 3, 20–9).)	New Orleans Saints	South	7	9	0	.438	3–3	6–6	.486	.415	W1
10	Minnesota Vikings	North	7	9	0	.438	1–5	6–6	.475	.308	W1
11 (Note: The NY Giants defeated both Atlanta and St. Louis head-to-head (Atlanta: Week 5, 30–20; St. Louis: Week 16, 37–27), while Atlanta finished ahead of St. Louis based on conference record.)	New York Giants	East	6	10	0	.375	2–4	4–8	.512	.323	L1
12	Atlanta Falcons	South	6	10	0	.375	5–1	6–6	.482	.380	L1
13	St. Louis Rams	West	6	10	0	.375	2–4	4–8	.531	.427	L3
14	Chicago Bears	North	5	11	0	.313	1–5	4–8	.529	.338	L5
15	Washington Redskins	East	4	12	0	.250	2–4	2–10	.496	.422	L1
16	Tampa Bay Buccaneers	South	2	14	0	.125	0–6	1–11	.486	.469	L6
Tiebreakers (Note: When breaking ties for three or more teams under the NFL's rules, they are first broken within divisions, then comparing only the highest-ranked remaining team from each division.)

== Game summaries ==
=== Preseason ===
==== Week P1: at Denver Broncos ====
Preseason Week One: Seattle Seahawks at Denver Broncos – Game summary

Quarter	1	2	3	4	Total
Seahawks	0	10	3	3	16
Broncos	7	0	7	7	21

at Sports Authority Field at Mile High, Denver, Colorado

- Date: August 7
- Game time: 7:05pm local
- Game weather: partly cloudy, 75 °F (24 °C), 41% humidity, wind S 3 miles per hour (4.8 km/h)
- Game attendance: 75,593
- Referee: Tony Corrente
- TV: KCPQ
- Gamecenter, Gamebook

==== Week P2: vs. San Diego Chargers ====
Preseason Week Two: Seattle Seahawks vs. San Diego Chargers – Game summary

Quarter	1	2	3	4	Total
Chargers	0	7	7	0	14
Seahawks	10	14	3	14	41

at CenturyLink Field, Seattle, Washington

- Date: August 15
- Game time: 7:05pm local
- Game weather: cloudy, 72 °F (22 °C), 67% humidity, wind NNW 4 miles per hour (6.4 km/h)
- Game attendance: 67,615
- Referee: Pete Morelli
- TV: KCPQ
- Gamecenter, Gamebook

==== Week P3: vs. Chicago Bears ====
Preseason Week Three: Seattle Seahawks vs. Chicago Bears – Game summary

Quarter	1	2	3	4	Total
Bears	0	0	0	6	6
Seahawks	14	17	3	0	34

at CenturyLink Field, Seattle, Washington

- Date: August 22
- Game time: 7:06pm local
- Game weather: clear, 73 °F (23 °C), 49% humidity, wind NW 7 miles per hour (11 km/h)
- Game attendance: 67,608
- Referee: Bill Leavy
- TV: NFLN, KCPQ
- Gamecenter, Gamebook

==== Week P4: at Oakland Raiders ====
Preseason Week Four: Seattle Seahawks at Oakland Raiders – Game summary

Quarter	1	2	3	4	Total
Seahawks	7	14	0	10	31
Raiders	21	14	3	3	41

at O.co Coliseum, Oakland, California

- Date: August 28
- Game time: 7:08pm local
- Game weather: clear, 70 °F (21 °C), 64% humidity, wind W 16 miles per hour (26 km/h)
- Game attendance: 50,831
- Referee: Ed Hochuli
- TV: NFLN, KCPQ
- Gamecenter, Gamebook

=== Regular season ===
==== Week 1: vs. Green Bay Packers ====
NFL Kickoff game

Week One: Green Bay Packers at Seattle Seahawks – Game summary

Quarter	1	2	3	4	Total
Packers	7	3	0	6	16
Seahawks	3	14	5	14	36

at CenturyLink Field, Seattle, Washington

- Date: September 4
- Game time: 5:42pm local
- Game weather: clear, 71 °F (22 °C), 52% humidity, wind NW 11 miles per hour (18 km/h)
- Game attendance: 68,424
- Referee: John Parry
- TV announcers (NBC): Al Michaels, Cris Collinsworth & Michele Tafoya
- Gamecenter, Gamebook

Game information

First quarter

- SEA – Steven Hauschka 35-yard field goal, 6:03. Seahawks 3–0. Drive: 11 plays, 48 yards, 5:50.
- GB – John Kuhn 2-yard run (Mason Crosby kick), 1:25. Packers 7–3. Drive: 6 plays, 34 yards, 3:07.

Second quarter

- SEA – Ricardo Lockette 33-yard pass from Russell Wilson (Steven Hauschka kick), 13:00. Seahawks 10–7. Drive: 6 plays, 80 yards, 3:25.
- GB – Mason Crosby 23-yard field goal, 6:52. Tied 10–10. Drive: 12 plays, 79 yards, 6:08.
- SEA – Marshawn Lynch 9-yard run (Steven Hauschka kick), 3:41. Seahawks 17–10. Drive: 6 plays, 70 yards, 3:11.

Third quarter

- SEA – Steven Hauschka 20-yard field goal, 10:28. Seahawks 20–10. Drive: 4 plays, 6 yards, 1:26.
- SEA – Safety, Derek Sherrod tackled by Tony McDaniel in end zone, 4:42. Seahawks 22–10.

Fourth quarter

- SEA – Marshawn Lynch 3-yard run (Steven Hauschka kick), 14:55. Seahawks 29–10. Drive: 9 plays, 53 yards, 4:47.
- GB – Randall Cobb 3-yard pass from Aaron Rodgers (pass failed), 9:31. Seahawks 29–16. Drive: 10 plays, 82 yards, 5:24.
- SEA – Derrick Coleman 15-yard pass from Russell Wilson (Steven Hauschka kick), 2:31. Seahawks 36–16. Drive: 13 plays, 80 yards, 7:00.

Top passers

- GB – Aaron Rodgers: 23/33, 189 yds, 1 TD, 1 INT
- SEA – Russell Wilson: 19/28, 191 yds, 2 TD

Top rushers

- GB – James Starks: 7 car, 37 yds
- SEA – Marshawn Lynch: 20 car, 110 yds, 2 TD

Top receivers

- GB – Jordy Nelson: 9 rec, 83 yds
- SEA – Percy Harvin: 7 rec, 59 yds

Top tacklers

- GB – Morgan Burnett: 5 solo, 3 asst
- SEA – Bobby Wagner: 6 solo, 8 asst, tfl

Team – pass – rush – total – to

- GB – 175 – 80 – 255 – 1
- SEA – 191 – 207 – 398 – 1

The Seahawks started their 2014 season at home against the Packers, the first meeting since the controversial 'Fail Mary' game in 2012. With the win, they became the first defending Super Bowl champion team since 2011 (also Packers) to win their regular season opening game for a 1–0 start.

This is the first game in NFL history to end in a score of 36–16. In all five years that Pete Carroll was head coach of the Seahawks, so far, he has had at least one game end in a score never before achieved.

==== Week 2: at San Diego Chargers ====
Week Two: Seattle Seahawks at San Diego Chargers – Game summary

Quarter	1	2	3	4	Total
Seahawks	7	7	7	0	21
Chargers	3	17	7	3	30

at Qualcomm Stadium, San Diego, California

- Date: September 14
- Game time: 1:05pm local
- Game weather: clear, 94 °F (34 °C), 33% humidity, wind W 8 miles per hour (13 km/h)
- Game attendance: 67,916
- Referee: Pete Morelli
- TV announcers (Fox): Thom Brennaman, David Diehl & Laura Okmin
- Gamecenter, Gamebook

Game information

First quarter

- SD – Nick Novak 50-yard field goal, 2:52. Chargers 3–0. Drive: 14 plays, 48 yards, 8:01.
- SEA – Percy Harvin 51-yard run (Steven Hauschka kick), 1:27. Seahawks 7–3. Drive: 3 plays, 60 yards, 1:25.

Second quarter

- SD – Antonio Gates 8-yard pass from Philip Rivers (Nick Novak kick), 12:05. Chargers 10–7. Drive: 9 plays, 80 yards, 4:22.
- SD – Nick Novak 43-yard field goal, 4:40. Chargers 13–7. Drive: 10 plays, 31 yards, 5:08.
- SD – Antonio Gates 8-yard pass from Philip Rivers (Nick Novak kick), 1:04. Chargers 20–7. Drive: 6 plays, 28 yards, 3:30.
- SEA – Robert Turbin 3-yard pass from Russell Wilson (Steven Hauschka kick), 0:12. Chargers 20–14. Drive: 5 plays, 69 yards, 0:52.

Third quarter

- SD – Antonio Gates 21-yard pass from Philip Rivers (Nick Novak kick), 3:01. Chargers 27–14. Drive: 12 plays, 75 yards, 6:24.
- SEA – Marshawn Lynch 14-yard pass from Russell Wilson (Steven Hauschka kick), 0:03. Chargers 27–21. Drive: 8 plays, 70 yards, 2:58.

Fourth quarter

- SD – Nick Novak 28-yard field goal, 0:16. Chargers 30–21. Drive: 4 plays, −5 yards, 1:30.

Top passers

- SEA – Russell Wilson: 17/25, 202 yds, 2 TD
- SD – Philip Rivers: 28/37, 284 yds, 3 TD

Top rushers

- SEA – Percy Harvin: 2 car, 45 yds, 1 TD
- SD – Danny Woodhead: 8 car, 32 yds

Top receivers

- SEA – Jermaine Kearse: 4 rec, 61 yds
- SD – Antonio Gates: 7 rec, 96 yds, 3 TD

Top tacklers

- SEA – Bobby Wagner: 9 solo, 1 asst
- SD – Shareece Wright: 5 solo, 2 asst, tfl, pd

Team – pass – rush – total – to

- SEA – 180 – 108 – 288 – 1
- SD – 276 – 101 – 377 – 0

==== Week 3: vs. Denver Broncos ====
Week Three: Denver Broncos at Seattle Seahawks – Game summary

Quarter	1	2	3	4	OT	Total
Broncos	3	0	0	17	0	20
Seahawks	3	14	0	3	6	26

at CenturyLink Field, Seattle, Washington

- Date: September 21
- Game time: 1:25pm local
- Game weather: clear, 70 °F (21 °C), 67% humidity, wind SSE 7 miles per hour (11 km/h)
- Game attendance: 68,447
- Referee: Bill Vinovich
- TV announcers (CBS): Jim Nantz, Phil Simms & Tracy Wolfson
- Gamecenter, Gamebook

Game information

First quarter

- SEA – Steven Hauschka 20-yard field goal, 10:33. Seahawks 3–0. Drive: 5 plays, 21 yards, 2:50.
- DEN – Brandon McManus 24-yard field goal, 3:27. Tied 3–3. Drive: 15 plays, 75 yards, 7:06.

Second quarter

- SEA – Ricardo Lockette 39-yard pass from Russell Wilson (Steven Hauschka kick), 3:05. Seahawks 10–3. Drive: 4 plays, 73 yards, 2:22.
- SEA – Marshawn Lynch 5-yard pass from Russell Wilson (Steven Hauschka kick), 0:12. Seahawks 17–3. Drive: 10 plays, 68 yards, 2:26.

Third quarter

- No scoring plays.

Fourth quarter

- DEN – Safety, Nate Irving and T. J. Ward tackled Marshawn Lynch in end zone, 13:07. Seahawks 17–5.
- DEN – Julius Thomas 3-yard pass from Peyton Manning (Brandon McManus kick), 9:20. Seahawks 17–12. Drive: 5 plays, 19 yards, 1:42.
- SEA – Steven Hauschka 28-yard field goal, 0:59. Seahawks 20–12. Drive: 5 plays, 25 yards, 1:13.
- DEN – Jacob Tamme 26-yard pass from Peyton Manning (Demaryius Thomas pass from Peyton Manning), 0:18. Tied 20–20. Drive: 6 plays, 80 yards, 0:41.

Overtime

- SEA – Marshawn Lynch 6-yard run, 9:14. Seahawks 26–20. Drive: 13 plays, 80 yards, 5:46.

Top passers

- DEN – Peyton Manning: 31/49, 303 yds, 2 TD, 1 INT
- SEA – Russell Wilson: 24/34, 258 yds, 2 TD, 1 INT

Top rushers

- DEN – Montee Ball: 14 car, 38 yds
- SEA – Marshawn Lynch: 26 car, 88 yds, 1 TD

Top receivers

- DEN – Emmanuel Sanders: 11 rec, 149 yds
- SEA – Doug Baldwin: 4 rec, 56 yds

Top tacklers

- DEN – Nate Irving: 2 solo, 11 asst, tfl
- SEA – Byron Maxwell: 9 solo, 2 asst, pd

Team – pass – rush – total – to

- DEN – 296 – 36 – 332 – 2
- SEA – 255 – 129 – 384 – 1

This would be the first Super Bowl rematch (Super Bowl opponents in the previous year who face each other again in the current year) since 1997. Although the Broncos would rally in the 4th quarter to send the game into overtime, the Seahawks scored a touchdown in overtime to win. They entered their bye week at 2–1.

==== Week 5: at Washington Redskins ====
Week Five: Seattle Seahawks at Washington Redskins – Game summary

Quarter	1	2	3	4	Total
Seahawks	7	10	0	10	27
Redskins	0	7	3	7	17

at FedExField, Landover, Maryland

- Date: October 6
- Game time: 8:30pm local
- Game weather: clear, 67 °F (19 °C), 47% humidity, wind SE4 miles per hour (6.4 km/h)
- Game attendance: 79,522
- Referee: Jeff Triplette
- TV announcers (ESPN): Mike Tirico, Jon Gruden & Lisa Salters
- Gamecenter, Gamebook

Game information

First quarter

- SEA – Jermaine Kearse 15-yard pass from Russell Wilson (Steven Hauschka kick), 12:44. Seahawks 7–0. Drive: 6 plays, 65 yards, 2:16.

Second quarter

- SEA – Steven Hauschka 40-yard field goal, 9:04. Seahawks 10–0. Drive: 8 plays, 31 yards, 4:49.
- SEA – Russell Wilson 9-yard run (Steven Hauschka kick), 4:37. Seahawks 17–0. Drive: 5 plays, 70 yards, 2:44.
- WAS – DeSean Jackson 60-yard pass from Kirk Cousins (Kai Forbath kick), 2:32. Seahawks 17–7. Drive: 4 plays, 80 yards, 2:05.

Third quarter

- WAS – Kai Forbath 27-yard field goal, 10:41. Seahawks 17–10. Drive: 7 plays, 71 yards, 4:19.

Fourth quarter

- SEA – Marshawn Lynch 9-yard pass from Russell Wilson (Steven Hauschka kick), 6:31. Seahawks 24–10. Drive: 12 plays, 53 yards, 7:33.
- WAS – Andre Roberts 6-yard pass from Kirk Cousins (Kai Forbath kick), 3:35. Seahawks 24–17. Drive: 11 plays, 80 yards, 2:56.
- SEA – Steven Hauschka 43-yard field goal, 0:21. Seahawks 27–17. Drive: 8 plays, 55 yards, 3:14.

Top passers

- SEA – Russell Wilson: 18/24, 201 yds, 2 TD
- WAS – Kirk Cousins: 21/36, 283 yds, 2 TD

Top rushers

- SEA – Russell Wilson: 11 car, 122 yds, 1 TD
- WAS – Alfred Morris: 13 car, 29 yds

Top receivers

- SEA – Doug Baldwin: 4 rec, 50 yds
- WAS – DeSean Jackson: 5 rec, 157 yds, 1 TD

Top tacklers

- SEA – Bobby Wagner: 5 solo, 3 asst, sack, 3 tfl, 2 pd
- WAS – Perry Riley: 7 solo, 3 asst

Team – pass – rush – total – to

- SEA – 178 – 225 – 403 – 0
- WAS – 275 – 32 – 307 – 0

Percy Harvin had three touchdowns in this game negated by penalties. This was his penultimate game with the Seahawks.

==== Week 6: vs. Dallas Cowboys ====
Week Six: Dallas Cowboys at Seattle Seahawks – Game summary

Quarter	1	2	3	4	Total
Cowboys	7	10	3	10	30
Seahawks	10	0	10	3	23

at CenturyLink Field, Seattle, Washington

- Date: October 12
- Game time: 1:26pm local
- Game weather: partly cloudy, 60 °F (16 °C), 81% humidity, wind S 6 miles per hour (9.7 km/h)
- Game attendance: 68,432
- Referee: Bill Leavy
- TV announcers (Fox): Thom Brennaman, Troy Aikman & Charissa Thompson
- Gamecenter, Gamebook

Game information

First quarter

- SEA – Steven Hauschka 33-yard field goal, 10:06. Seahawks 3–0. Drive: 10 plays, 64 yards, 4:54.
- SEA – Mike Morgan 25-yard blocked punt return (Steven Hauschka kick), 7:13. Seahawks 10–0.
- DAL – Gavin Escobar 2-yard pass from Tony Romo (Dan Bailey kick), 2:34. Seahawks 10–7. Drive: 9 plays, 80 yards, 4:39.

Second quarter

- DAL – Dan Bailey 42-yard field goal, 5:15. Tied 10–10. Drive: 15 plays, 71 yards, 9:45.
- DAL – Jason Witten 3-yard pass from Tony Romo (Dan Bailey kick), 0:16. Cowboys 17–10. Drive: 10 plays, 80 yards, 2:48.

Third quarter

- SEA – Russell Wilson 9-yard run (Steven Hauschka kick), 6:19. Tied 17–17. Drive: 2 plays, 14 yards, 0:38.
- SEA – Steven Hauschka 33-yard field goal, 3:20. Seahawks 20–17. Drive: 4 plays, 5 yards, 1:26.
- DAL – Dan Bailey 56-yard field goal, 1:04. Tied 20–20. Drive: 5 plays, 43 yards, 2:16.

Fourth quarter

- SEA – Steven Hauschka 48-yard field goal, 8:16. Seahawks 23–20. Drive: 7 plays, 12 yards, 2:28.
- DAL – DeMarco Murray 15-yard run (Dan Bailey kick), 3:16. Cowboys 27–23. Drive: 9 plays, 80 yards, 5:00.
- DAL – Dan Bailey 31-yard field goal, 1:09. Cowboys 30–23. Drive: 4 plays, 10 yards, 1:26.

Top passers

- DAL – Tony Romo: 21/32, 250 yds, 2 TD
- SEA – Russell Wilson: 14/28, 126 yds, 1 INT

Top rushers

- DAL – DeMarco Murray: 28 car, 115 yds, 1 TD
- SEA – Marshawn Lynch: 10 car, 61 yds

Top receivers

- DAL – Terrance Williams: 2 rec, 70 yds
- SEA – Jermaine Kearse: 3 rec, 62 yds

Top tacklers

- DAL – Justin Durant: 3 solo, 6 asst, pd
- SEA – Marcus Burley: 6 solo, 2 asst

Team – pass – rush – total – to

- DAL – 239 – 162 – 401 – 2
- SEA – 126 – 80 – 206 – 1

The Cowboys defeated the Seahawks 30–23. The Seahawks suffered only their second home loss since Russell Wilson became the starting quarterback at the start of the 2012 season (the other loss was to the Cardinals in Week 16 of the 2013 season). Wilson struggled mightily, going 14/28 for only 126 yards with 1 rushing touchdown, 0 touchdown passes, and a game sealing interception. The defense also gave up several big plays, including a 3rd and 20 first down conversion in the 4th quarter. The conversion eventually led to a touchdown that put the Cowboys up 27–23. The 30 points that were allowed by the Seahawks were the most they allowed in any home game in the Wilson era. With the loss, the Seahawks fell to 3–2 on the season.

==== Week 7: at St. Louis Rams ====
Week Seven: Seattle Seahawks at St. Louis Rams – Game summary

Quarter	1	2	3	4	Total
Seahawks	3	3	7	13	26
Rams	7	14	0	7	28

at Edward Jones Dome, St. Louis, Missouri

- Date: October 19
- Game time: 12:00pm local
- Game weather: indoors
- Game attendance: 57,855
- Referee: Brad Allen
- TV announcers (Fox): Kenny Albert, Daryl Johnston & Tony Siragusa
- Gamecenter, Gamebook

Game information

First quarter

- SEA – Steven Hauschka 24-yard field goal, 9:01. Seahawks 3–0. Drive: 9 plays, 68 yards, 4:06.
- STL – Tre Mason 6-yard run (Greg Zuerlein kick), 5:19. Rams 7–3. Drive: 6 plays, 31 yards, 3:42.

Second quarter

- STL – Benny Cunningham 5-yard pass from Austin Davis (Greg Zuerlein kick), 13:12. Rams 14–3. Drive: 8 plays, 74 yards, 5:09.
- STL – Stedman Bailey 90-yard punt return (Greg Zuerlein kick), 7:05. Rams 21–3.
- SEA – Steven Hauschka 35-yard field goal, 0:07. Rams 21–6. Drive: 9 plays, 41 yards, 1:48.

Third quarter

- SEA – Russell Wilson 19-yard run (Steven Hauschka kick), 4:22. Rams 21–13. Drive: 12 plays, 82 yards, 6:06.

Fourth quarter

- SEA – Cooper Helfet 19-yard pass from Russell Wilson (pass failed), 9:44. Rams 21–19. Drive: 9 plays, 91 yards, 5:10.
- STL – Lance Kendricks 4-yard pass from Austin Davis (Greg Zuerlein kick), 5:36. Rams 28–19. Drive: 8 plays, 80 yards, 4:08.
- SEA – Doug Baldwin 9-yard pass from Russell Wilson (Steven Hauschka kick), 3:18. Rams 28–26. Drive: 8 plays, 80 yards, 2:18.

Top passers

- SEA – Russell Wilson: 23/36, 313 yds, 2 TD
- STL – Austin Davis: 17/20, 155 yds, 2 TD

Top rushers

- SEA – Russell Wilson: 7 car, 106 yds, 1 TD
- STL – Tre Mason: 18 car, 85 yds, 1 TD

Top receivers

- SEA – Doug Baldwin: 7 rec, 123 yds, 1 TD
- STL – Benny Cunningham: 5 rec, 46 yds, 1 TD

Top tacklers

- SEA – Malcolm Smith: 10 solo
- STL – Janoris Jenkins: 7 solo, 2 asst, pd

Team – pass – rush – total – to

- SEA – 292 – 171 – 463 – 0
- STL – 170 – 102 – 272 – 0

==== Week 8: at Carolina Panthers ====
Week Eight: Seattle Seahawks at Carolina Panthers – Game summary

Quarter	1	2	3	4	Total
Seahawks	0	3	3	7	13
Panthers	3	3	0	3	9

at Bank of America Stadium, Charlotte, North Carolina

- Date: October 26
- Game time: 1:04pm local
- Game weather: clear, 77 °F (25 °C), 38% humidity, wind W 9 miles per hour (14 km/h)
- Game attendance: 74,042
- Referee: Walt Coleman
- TV announcers (CBS): Ian Eagle, Dan Fouts & Jenny Dell
- Gamecenter, Gamebook

Game information

First quarter

- CAR – Graham Gano 31-yard field goal, 6:21. Panthers 3–0. Drive: 11 plays, 58 yards, 6:26.

Second quarter

- CAR – Graham Gano 26-yard field goal, 13:23. Panthers 6–0. Drive: 12 plays, 46 yards, 6:21.
- SEA – Steven Hauschka 58-yard field goal, 11:00. Panthers 6–3. Drive: 5 plays, 13 yards, 2:23.

Third quarter

- SEA – Steven Hauschka 29-yard field goal, 7:13. Tied 6–6. Drive: 12 plays, 29 yards, 6:00.

Fourth quarter

- CAR – Graham Gano 46-yard field goal, 4:37. Panthers 9–6. Drive: 9 plays, 64 yards, 4:56.
- SEA – Luke Willson 23-yard pass from Russell Wilson (Steven Hauschka kick), 0:47. Seahawks 13–9. Drive: 9 plays, 80 yards, 3:50.

Top passers

- SEA – Russell Wilson: 20/32, 199 yds, 1 TD, 1 INT
- CAR – Cam Newton: 12/22, 171 yds, 1 INT

Top rushers

- SEA – Marshawn Lynch: 14 car, 62 yds
- CAR – Jonathan Stewart: 16 car, 79 yds

Top receivers

- SEA – Doug Baldwin: 6 rec, 61 yds
- CAR – Kelvin Benjamin: 4 rec, 94 yds

Top tacklers

- SEA – Earl Thomas: 4 solo, 5 asst, tfl
- CAR – Thomas Davis: 4 solo, 6 asst

Team – pass – rush – total – to

- SEA – 191 – 119 – 310 – 2
- CAR – 152 – 114 – 266 – 2

This was the first Seahawks road game to be televised by CBS since 2001, their last year in the AFC West.

==== Week 9: vs. Oakland Raiders ====
Week Nine: Oakland Raiders at Seattle Seahawks – Game summary

Quarter	1	2	3	4	Total
Raiders	3	0	14	7	24
Seahawks	14	10	0	6	30

at CenturyLink Field, Seattle, Washington

- Date: November 2
- Game time: 1:26pm local
- Game weather: rain, 54 °F (12 °C), 80% humidity, wind S 9 miles per hour (14 km/h)
- Game attendance: 68,337
- Referee: Ed Hochuli
- TV announcers (CBS): Kevin Harlan & Rich Gannon
- Gamecenter, Gamebook

Game information

First quarter

- OAK – Sebastian Janikowski 48-yard field goal, 9:10. Raiders 3–0. Drive: 12 plays, 50 yards, 5:50.
- SEA – Marshawn Lynch 3-yard run (Steven Hauschka kick), 4:07. Seahawks 7–3. Drive: 8 plays, 72 yards, 5:03.
- SEA – Bruce Irvin 35-yard interception return (Steven Hauschka kick), 0:00. Seahawks 14–3.

Second quarter

- SEA – Steven Hauschka 34-yard field goal, 12:24. Seahawks 17–3. Drive: 4 plays, 2 yards, 0:59.
- SEA – Marshawn Lynch 5-yard run (Steven Hauschka kick), 0:54. Seahawks 24–3. Drive: 11 plays, 78 yards, 2:56.

Third quarter

- OAK – Brice Butler recovered blocked punt in end zone (Sebastian Janikowski kick), 13:52. Seahawks 24–10.
- OAK – Mychal Rivera 1-yard pass from Derek Carr (Sebastian Janikowski kick), 2:58. Seahawks 24–17. Drive: 5 plays, 30 yards, 2:16.

Fourth quarter

- SEA – Steven Hauschka 30-yard field goal, 14:50. Seahawks 27–17. Drive: 9 plays, 68 yards, 3:08.
- SEA – Steven Hauschka 40-yard field goal, 9:19. Seahawks 30–17. Drive: 7 plays, 25 yards, 3:52.
- OAK – Mychal Rivera 1-yard pass from Derek Carr (Sebastian Janikowski kick), 1:52. Seahawks 30–24. Drive: 9 plays, 64 yards, 2:22.

Top passers

- OAK – Derek Carr: 24/41, 194 yds, 2 TD, 2 INT
- SEA – Russell Wilson: 17/35, 179 yds

Top rushers

- OAK – Darren McFadden: 13 car, 20 yds
- SEA – Marshawn Lynch: 21 car, 67 yds, 2 TD

Top receivers

- OAK – Darren McFadden: 4 rec, 47 yds
- SEA – Marshawn Lynch: 5 rec, 76 yds

Top tacklers

- OAK – Sio Moore: 8 solo, 3 asst, sack, tfl
- SEA – K. J. Wright: 10 solo, 3 asst, pd

Team – pass – rush – total – to

- OAK – 189 – 37 – 226 – 3
- SEA – 177 – 149 – 326 – 0

==== Week 10: vs. New York Giants ====
Week Ten: New York Giants at Seattle Seahawks – Game summary

Quarter	1	2	3	4	Total
Giants	7	10	0	0	17
Seahawks	7	7	3	21	38

at CenturyLink Field, Seattle, Washington

- Date: November 9
- Game time: 1:26pm local
- Game weather: cloudy, 50 °F (10 °C), 88% humidity, wind calm
- Game attendance: 68,352
- Referee: Pete Morelli
- TV announcers (Fox): Joe Buck, Troy Aikman & Erin Andrews
- Gamecenter, Gamebook

Game information

First quarter

- SEA – Marshawn Lynch 1-yard run (Steven Hauschka kick), 10:23. Seahawks 7–0. Drive: 6 plays, 80 yards, 3:19.
- NYG – Preston Parker 6-yard pass from Eli Manning (Josh Brown kick), 4:32. Tied 7–7. Drive: 5 plays, 24 yards, 1:37.

Second quarter

- NYG – Andre Williams 3-yard run (Josh Brown kick), 13:38. Giants 14–7. Drive: 5 plays, 80 yards, 2:23.
- SEA – Marshawn Lynch 2-yard run (Steven Hauschka kick), 1:57. Tied 14–14. Drive: 15 plays, 85 yards, 8:25.
- NYG – Josh Brown 41-yard field goal, 0:00. Giants 17–14. Drive: 11 plays, 57 yards, 1:57.

Third quarter

- SEA – Steven Hauschka 28-yard field goal, 4:13. Tied 17–17. Drive: 8 plays, 70 yards, 3:55.

Fourth quarter

- SEA – Marshawn Lynch 3-yard run (Steven Hauschka kick), 12:47. Seahawks 24–17. Drive: 7 plays, 58 yards, 2:52.
- SEA – Marshawn Lynch 16-yard run (Steven Hauschka kick), 7:47. Seahawks 31–17. Drive: 7 plays, 53 yards, 3:28.
- SEA – Russell Wilson 1-yard run (Steven Hauschka kick), 5:19. Seahawks 38–17. Drive: 2 plays, 46 yards, 0:27.

Top passers

- NYG – Eli Manning: 29/44, 283 yds, 1 TD, 1 INT
- SEA – Russell Wilson: 10/17, 172 yds, 2 INT

Top rushers

- NYG – Andre Williams: 13 car, 33 yds
- SEA – Marshawn Lynch: 21 car, 140 yds, 4 TD

Top receivers

- NYG – Odell Beckham Jr.: 7 rec, 108 yds
- SEA – Jermaine Kearse: 3 rec, 70 yds

Top tacklers

- NYG – Jameel McClain: 5 solo, 7 asst, tfl, ff
- SEA – Jeron Johnson: 5 solo, 3 asst, pd

Team – pass – rush – total – to

- NYG – 270 – 54 – 324 – 2
- SEA – 160 – 350 – 510 – 3

==== Week 11: at Kansas City Chiefs ====
Week Eleven: Seattle Seahawks at Kansas City Chiefs – Game summary

Quarter	1	2	3	4	Total
Seahawks	0	13	7	0	20
Chiefs	7	7	3	7	24

at Arrowhead Stadium, Kansas City, Missouri

- Date: November 16
- Game time: 12:04pm local
- Game weather: cloudy, 21 °F (−6 °C), 65% humidity, wind NE 8 miles per hour (13 km/h)
- Game attendance: 76,463
- Referee: Bill Leavy
- TV announcers (Fox): Kenny Albert, Daryl Johnston & Tony Siragusa
- Gamecenter, Gamebook

Game information

First quarter

- KC – Jamaal Charles 1-yard run (Cairo Santos kick), 4:22 (KC 7–0)

Second quarter

- SEA – Doug Baldwin 7-yard pass from Russell Wilson (Steven Hauschka kick), 10:22 (Tied 7–7)
- KC – Jamaal Charles 16-yard run (Cairo Santos kick), 8:09 (KC 14–7)
- SEA – Steven Hauschka 24-yard field goal, 1:39 (KC 14–10)
- SEA – Steven Hauschka 27-yard field goal, 0:00 (KC 14–13)

Third quarter

- KC – Cairo Santos 23-yard field goal, 7:39 (KC 17–13)
- SEA – Tony Moeaki 1-yard pass from Russell Wilson (Steven Hauschka kick), 0:23 (SEA 20–17)

Fourth quarter

- KC – Knile Davis 4-yard run (Cairo Santos kick), 13:41 (KC 24–20)

Top passers

- SEA – Russell Wilson: 24/32, 178 yds, 2 TD
- KC – Alex Smith: 11/16, 108 yds

Top rushers

- SEA – Marshawn Lynch: 24 car, 124 yds
- KC – Jamaal Charles: 20 car, 159 yds, 2 TD

Top receivers

- SEA – Jermaine Kearse: 5 rec, 54 yds
- KC – Travis Kelce: 3 rec, 37 yds

Top tacklers

- SEA – Earl Thomas: 10 solo, 1 asst, pd, 2 ff
- KC – Ron Parker: 11 solo

Team – pass – rush – total – to

- SEA – 168 – 204 – 372 – 0
- KC – 108 – 190 – 298 – 2

==== Week 12: vs. Arizona Cardinals ====
Week Twelve: Arizona Cardinals at Seattle Seahawks – Game summary

Quarter	1	2	3	4	Total
Cardinals	0	3	0	0	3
Seahawks	3	6	10	0	19

at CenturyLink Field, Seattle, Washington

- Date: November 23
- Game time: 1:06pm local
- Game weather: clear, 51 °F (11 °C), 79% humidity, wind SSW 10 miles per hour (16 km/h)
- Game attendance: 68,327
- Referee: Gene Steratore
- TV announcers (Fox): Kevin Burkhardt, John Lynch & Pam Oliver
- Gamecenter, Gamebook

Game information

First quarter

- SEA – Steven Hauschka 27-yard field goal, 8:45 (SEA 3–0)

Second quarter

- SEA – Steven Hauschka 32-yard field goal, 12:52 (SEA 6–0)
- SEA – Steven Hauschka 52-yard field goal, 10:09 (SEA 9–0)
- ARI – Chandler Catanzaro 23-yard field goal, 0:14 (SEA 9–3)

Third quarter

- SEA – Steven Hauschka 40-yard field goal, 8:34 (SEA 12–3)
- SEA – Cooper Helfet 20-yard pass from Russell Wilson (Steven Hauschka kick), 0:52 (SEA 19–3)

Fourth quarter

- No scoring plays

Top passers

- ARI – Drew Stanton: 14/26, 149 yds, 1 INT
- SEA – Russell Wilson: 17/22, 211 yds, 1 TD

Top rushers

- ARI – Andre Ellington: 10 car, 24 yds
- SEA – Russell Wilson: 10 car, 73 yds

Top receivers

- ARI – John Brown: 3 rec, 61 yds
- SEA – Ricardo Lockette: 1 rec, 48 yds

Top tacklers

- ARI – Rashad Johnson: 6 solo, 3 asst
- SEA – Kam Chancellor: 7 solo, 1 asst

Team – pass – rush – total – to

- ARI – 140 – 64 – 204 – 1
- SEA – 169 – 124 – 293 – 0

==== Week 13: at San Francisco 49ers ====
Thanksgiving Day game

Week Thirteen: Seattle Seahawks at San Francisco 49ers – Game summary

Quarter	1	2	3	4	Total
Seahawks	7	6	3	3	19
49ers	0	0	3	0	3

at Levi's Stadium, Santa Clara, California

- Date: November 27
- Game time: 5:31pm local
- Game weather: clear, 58 °F (14 °C), 45% humidity, wind calm
- Game attendance: 70,799
- Referee: Tony Corrente
- TV announcers (NBC): Al Michaels, Cris Collinsworth & Michele Tafoya
- Gamecenter, Gamebook

Game information

First quarter

- SEA – Robert Turbin 13-yard pass from Russell Wilson (Steven Hauschka kick), 1:29 (SEA 7–0)

Second quarter

- SEA – Steven Hauschka 21-yard field goal, 11:07 (SEA 10–0)
- SEA – Steven Hauschka 36-yard field goal, 5:40 (SEA 13–0)

Third quarter

- SEA – Steven Hauschka 35-yard field goal, 8:05 (SEA 16–0)
- SF – Phil Dawson 40-yard field goal, 1:06 (SEA 16–3)

Fourth quarter

- SEA – Steven Hauschka 46-yard field goal, 10:11 (SEA 19–3)

Top passers

- SEA – Russell Wilson: 15/22, 236 yds, 1 TD
- SF – Colin Kaepernick: 16/29, 121 yds, 2 INT

Top rushers

- SEA – Marshawn Lynch: 20 car, 104 yds
- SF – Frank Gore: 10 car, 28 yds

Top receivers

- SEA – Tony Moeaki: 1 rec, 63 yds
- SF – Carlos Hyde: 3 rec, 38 yds

Top tacklers

- SEA – Bobby Wagner: 9 solo, 1 asst, 2 tfl
- SF – Chris Borland: 15 solo, tfl

Team – pass – rush – total – to

- SEA – 222 – 157 – 379 – 0
- SF – 100 – 64 – 164 – 3

==== Week 14: at Philadelphia Eagles ====
Week Fourteen: Seattle Seahawks at Philadelphia Eagles – Game summary

Quarter	1	2	3	4	Total
Seahawks	0	10	14	0	24
Eagles	7	0	7	0	14

at Lincoln Financial Field, Philadelphia, Pennsylvania

- Date: December 7
- Game time: 4:25pm local
- Game weather: clear, 45 °F (7 °C), 32% humidity, wind NNE 15 miles per hour (24 km/h)
- Game attendance: 69,596
- Referee: Bill Vinovich
- TV announcers (Fox): Joe Buck, Troy Aikman & Erin Andrews
- Gamecenter, Gamebook

Game information

First quarter

- PHI – Jeremy Maclin 1-yard pass from Mark Sanchez (Cody Parkey kick), 3:37 (PHI 7–0)

Second quarter

- SEA – Russell Wilson 26-yard run (Steven Hauschka kick), 14:17 (Tied 7–7)
- SEA – Steven Hauschka 44-yard field goal, 0:02 (SEA 10–7)

Third quarter

- SEA – Marshawn Lynch 15-yard pass from Russell Wilson (Steven Hauschka kick), 14:03 (SEA 17–7)
- PHI – Zach Ertz 35-yard pass from Mark Sanchez (Cody Parkey kick), 12:09 (SEA 17–14)
- SEA – Doug Baldwin 23-yard pass from Russell Wilson (Steven Hauschka kick), 9:01 (SEA 24–14)

Fourth quarter

- No scoring plays

Top passers

- SEA – Russell Wilson: 22/37, 263 yds, 2 TD
- PHI – Mark Sanchez: 10/20, 96 yds, 2 TD, 1 INT

Top rushers

- SEA – Marshawn Lynch: 23 car, 86 yds
- PHI – LeSean McCoy: 17 car, 50 yds

Top receivers

- SEA – Doug Baldwin: 5 rec, 97 yds, 1 TD
- PHI – Zach Ertz: 2 rec, 39 yds, 1 TD

Top tacklers

- SEA – Bobby Wagner: 7 solo
- PHI – Fletcher Cox: 8 solo, 3 asst, tfl

Team – pass – rush – total – to

- SEA – 252 – 188 – 440 – 2
- PHI – 82 – 57 – 139 – 2

==== Week 15: vs. San Francisco 49ers ====
Week Fifteen: San Francisco 49ers at Seattle Seahawks – Game summary

Quarter	1	2	3	4	Total
49ers	0	7	0	0	7
Seahawks	3	0	7	7	17

at CenturyLink Field, Seattle, Washington

- Date: December 14
- Game time: 1:26pm local
- Game weather: clear, 46 °F (8 °C), 74% humidity, wind NW 4 miles per hour (6.4 km/h)
- Game attendance: 68,526
- Referee: Ed Hochuli
- TV announcers (Fox): Joe Buck, Troy Aikman & Erin Andrews
- Gamecenter, Gamebook

Game information

First quarter

- SEA – Steven Hauschka 38-yard field goal, 3:40 (SEA 3–0)

Second quarter

- SF – Frank Gore 10-yard run (Phil Dawson kick), 13:22 (SF 7–3)

Third quarter

- SEA – Marshawn Lynch 4-yard run (Steven Hauschka kick), 2:19 (SEA 10–7)

Fourth quarter

- SEA – Paul Richardson 10-yard pass from Russell Wilson (Steven Hauschka kick), 13:20 (SEA 17–7)

Top passers

- SF – Colin Kaepernick: 11/19, 141 yds
- SEA – Russell Wilson: 12/24, 168 yds, 1 TD, 1 INT

Top rushers

- SF – Carlos Hyde: 6 car, 55 yds
- SEA – Marshawn Lynch: 21 car, 91 yds, 1 TD

Top receivers

- SF – Bruce Miller: 4 rec, 56 yds
- SEA – Jermaine Kearse: 5 rec, 78 yds

Top tacklers

- SF – Chris Borland: 3 solo, 3 asst
- SEA – Bobby Wagner: 9 solo, 1 asst, sack, 2, tfl

Team – pass – rush – total – to

- SF – 105 – 140 – 245 – 0
- SEA – 138 – 152 – 290 – 1

This marked the first time the Seahawks swept the 49ers since 2007.

==== Week 16: at Arizona Cardinals ====
Week Sixteen: Seattle Seahawks at Arizona Cardinals – Game summary

Quarter	1	2	3	4	Total
Seahawks	0	14	0	21	35
Cardinals	0	3	3	0	6

at University of Phoenix Stadium, Glendale, Arizona

- Date: December 21
- Game time: 6:30pm local
- Game weather: indoors
- Game attendance: 63,806
- Referee: Walt Anderson
- TV announcers (NBC): Al Michaels, Cris Collinsworth & Michele Tafoya
- Gamecenter, Gamebook

Game information

First quarter

- No scoring plays

Second quarter

- ARI – Chandler Catanzaro 27-yard field goal, 7:55 (ARI 3–0)
- SEA – Luke Willson 80-yard pass from Russell Wilson (Steven Hauschka kick), 7:03 (SEA 7–3)
- SEA – Marshawn Lynch 6-yard run (Steven Hauschka kick), 3:41 (SEA 14–3)

Third quarter

- ARI – Chandler Catanzaro 32-yard field goal, 0:59 (SEA 14–6)

Fourth quarter

- SEA – Luke Willson 20-yard pass from Russell Wilson (Steven Hauschka kick), 11:59 (SEA 21–6)
- SEA – Marshawn Lynch 79-yard run (Steven Hauschka kick), 10:14 (SEA 28–6)
- SEA – Russell Wilson 5-yard run (Steven Hauschka kick), 4:40 (SEA 35–6)

Top passers

- SEA – Russell Wilson: 20/31, 339 yds, 2 TD
- ARI – Ryan Lindley: 18/44, 216 yds, 1 INT

Top rushers

- SEA – Marshawn Lynch: 10 car, 113 yds, 2 TD
- ARI – Stepfan Taylor: 11 car, 19 yds

Top receivers

- SEA – Luke Willson: 3 rec, 139 yds, 2 TD
- ARI – John Brown: 3 rec, 54 yds

Top tacklers

- SEA – Bobby Wagner: 8 solo, 1 asst
- ARI – Rashad Johnson: 7 solo, 1 asst

Team – pass – rush – total – to

- SEA – 329 – 267 – 596 – 0
- ARI – 187 – 29 – 216 – 1

==== Week 17: vs. St. Louis Rams ====
Week Seventeen: St. Louis Rams at Seattle Seahawks – Game summary

Quarter	1	2	3	4	Total
Rams	3	3	0	0	6
Seahawks	0	0	6	14	20

at CenturyLink Field, Seattle, Washington

- Date: December 28
- Game time: 1:27pm local
- Game weather: cloudy, 43 °F (6 °C), 81% humidity, wind SE 5 miles per hour (8.0 km/h)
- Game attendance: 68,453
- Referee: Ron Torbert
- TV announcers (Fox): Gus Johnson, Charles Davis & Molly McGrath
- Gamecenter, Gamebook

Game information

First quarter

- STL – Greg Zuerlein 33-yard field goal, 6:25 (STL 3–0)

Second quarter

- STL – Greg Zuerlein 52-yard field goal, 4:18 (STL 6–0)

Third quarter

- SEA – Steven Hauschka 42-yard field goal, 11:13 (STL 6–3)
- SEA – Steven Hauschka 45-yard field goal, 4:45 (Tied 6–6)

Fourth quarter

- SEA – Marshawn Lynch 5-yard run (Steven Hauschka kick), 12:07 (SEA 13–6)
- SEA – Bruce Irvin 49-yard interception return (Steven Hauschka kick), 9:50 (SEA 20–6)

Top passers

- STL – Shaun Hill: 26/37, 243 yds, 2 INT
- SEA – Russell Wilson: 17/25, 239 yds, 1 INT

Top rushers

- STL – Tre Mason: 11 car, 28 yds
- SEA – Marshawn Lynch: 14 car, 60 yds, 1 TD

Top receivers

- STL – Benny Cunningham: 7 rec, 57 yds
- SEA – Paul Richardson: 5 rec, 60 yds

Top tacklers

- STL – James Laurinaitis: 4 solo, 5 asst
- SEA – Earl Thomas: 11 solo, 1 asst, ff

Team – pass – rush – total – to

- STL – 203 – 42 – 245 – 3
- SEA – 222 – 132 – 354 – 2

With the win, the Seahawks clinched the NFC West, a first-round bye and home-field advantage throughout the playoffs for the second consecutive season.

=== Postseason ===
Seattle entered the postseason as the #1 seed in the NFC.

==== NFC Divisional Playoff: vs. #4 Carolina Panthers ====
NFC Divisional Playoff: #4 Carolina Panthers at #1 Seattle Seahawks – Game summary

Quarter	1	2	3	4	Total
Panthers	0	10	0	7	17
Seahawks	7	7	0	17	31

at CenturyLink Field, Seattle, Washington

- Date: January 10, 2015
- Game time: 5:21pm local
- Game weather: cloudy, 48 °F (9 °C), 89% humidity, wind calm
- Game attendance: 68,524
- Referee: Terry McAulay
- TV announcers (Fox): Kevin Burkhardt, John Lynch & Pam Oliver
- Gamecenter, Gamebook

Game information

First quarter

- SEA – Doug Baldwin 16-yard pass from Russell Wilson (Steven Hauschka kick), 0:56 (SEA 7–0) Drive: 4 plays, 28 yards, 1:26

Second quarter

- CAR – Kelvin Benjamin 7-yard pass from Cam Newton (Graham Gano kick), 7:44 (Tied 7–7) Drive: 14 plays, 79 yards, 8:12
- SEA – Jermaine Kearse 63-yard pass from Russell Wilson (Steven Hauschka kick), 4:54 (SEA 14–7) Drive: 5 plays, 77 yards, 2:50
- CAR – Graham Gano 35-yard field goal, 0:00 (SEA 14–10) Drive: 13 plays, 62 yards, 4:54

Third quarter

- No scoring plays

Fourth quarter

- SEA – Steven Hauschka 37-yard field goal, 14:55 (SEA 17–10) Drive: 12 plays, 69 yards, 6:32
- SEA – Luke Willson 25-yard pass from Russell Wilson (Steven Hauschka kick), 10:26 (SEA 24–10) Drive: 6 plays, 58 yards, 2:27
- SEA – Kam Chancellor 90-yard interception return (Steven Hauschka kick), 5:55 (SEA 31–10)
- CAR – Kelvin Benjamin 15-yard pass from Cam Newton (Graham Gano kick), 2:34 (SEA 31–17) Drive: 8 plays, 83 yards, 3:21

Top passers

- CAR – Cam Newton: 23/36, 246 yds, 2 TD, 2 INT
- SEA – Russell Wilson: 15/22, 268 yds, 3 TD

Top rushers

- CAR – Jonathan Stewart: 13 car, 70 yds
- SEA – Marshawn Lynch: 14 car, 59 yds

Top receivers

- CAR – Kelvin Benjamin: 7 rec, 75 yds, 2 TD
- SEA – Jermaine Kearse: 3 rec, 129 yds, 1 TD

Top tacklers

- CAR – Thomas Davis: 6 solo, 3 asst, sack, tfl
- SEA – Earl Thomas: 5 solo, 6 asst, 2 pd, ff

Team – pass – rush – total – to

- CAR – 230 – 132 – 362 – 3
- SEA – 248 – 100 – 348 – 0

The Seahawks defeated the Panthers 31–17, becoming the first defending Super Bowl champion to win a playoff game since the 2005 Patriots, and advanced to their second consecutive NFC Championship Game.

==== NFC Championship Game: vs. #2 Green Bay Packers ====
NFC Championship Game: #2 Green Bay Packers at #1 Seattle Seahawks – Game summary

Quarter	1	2	3	4	OT	Total
Packers	13	3	0	6	0	22
Seahawks	0	0	7	15	6	28

at CenturyLink Field, Seattle, Washington

- Date: January 18, 2015
- Game time: 12:06pm local
- Game weather: rain, 52 °F (11 °C), 70% humidity, wind SSW 15 miles per hour (24 km/h)
- Game attendance: 68,538
- Referee: Tony Corrente
- TV announcers (Fox): Joe Buck, Troy Aikman, Erin Andrews & Chris Myers
- Gamecenter, Gamebook

Game information

First quarter

- GB – Mason Crosby 18-yard field goal, 8:07 (GB 3–0)
- GB – Mason Crosby 19-yard field goal, 5:07 (GB 6–0)
- GB – Randall Cobb 13-yard pass from Aaron Rodgers, Mason Crosby kick, 0:00 (GB 13–0)

Second quarter

- GB – Mason Crosby 40-yard field goal, 9:37 (GB 16–0)

Third quarter

- SEA – Garry Gilliam 19-yard pass from Jon Ryan, Steven Hauschka kick, 4:44 (GB 16–7)

Fourth quarter

- GB – Mason Crosby 48-yard field goal, 10:53 (GB 19–7)
- SEA – Russell Wilson 1-yard run (Steven Hauschka kick), 2:09 (GB 19–14)
- SEA – Marshawn Lynch 24-yard run (2pt-PAT: Luke Willson pass from Russell Wilson), 1:25 (SEA 22–19)
- GB – Mason Crosby 48-yard field goal, 0:14 (Tied 22–22)

Overtime

- SEA – Jermaine Kearse 35-yard pass from Russell Wilson, 11:41 (SEA 28–22)

Top passers

- GB – Aaron Rodgers: 19/34, 178 yds, 1 TD, 2 INT
- SEA – Russell Wilson: 14/29, 209 yds, 1 TD, 4 INT

Top rushers

- GB – Eddie Lacy: 21 car, 73 yds
- SEA – Marshawn Lynch: 25 car, 157 yds, 1 TD

Top receivers

- GB – Jordy Nelson: 5 rec, 71 yds
- SEA – Doug Baldwin: 6 rec, 106 yds

Top tacklers

- GB – Morgan Burnett: 8 solo, 2 asst, 2 sacks, 3 tfl, INT, pd
- SEA – Bobby Wagner: 2 solo, 8 asst

Team – pass – rush – total – to

- GB – 171 – 135 – 306 – 2
- SEA – 203 – 194 – 397 – 5

After trailing 16–0 in the 3rd quarter and 19–7 with just over 2 minutes remaining, Russell Wilson, who threw 4 interceptions in the game, rallied Seattle to a much needed touchdown to bring the score to 19–14 with 2:09 left in regulation. The Seahawks then recovered an onside kick to re-gain possession of the football. After a relatively quick drive, Marshawn Lynch scored on a 24-yard touchdown run, making the score 22–19 after a successful 2-point conversion with 1:25 left. Aaron Rodgers then drove the Packers to the Seattle 30 yard line, where Mason Crosby kicked a 48-yard field goal to tie and send the game into overtime. Seattle then won the coin toss and drove 87 yards in 6 plays, capped by consecutive 35 yard completions, the first on 3rd-and-6 from the Seahawks own 30 yard line to Doug Baldwin, and the second a touchdown pass from Wilson to Jermaine Kearse to win the game 28–22. With the win, the Seahawks became the first defending champion to return to the Super Bowl since the 2004 Patriots. This would be the Seahawks last appearance or win in the NFC Championship until 2025.

==== Super Bowl XLIX: vs. #A1 New England Patriots ====
Super Bowl XLIX: #A1 New England Patriots vs. #N1 Seattle Seahawks – Game summary

Quarter	1	2	3	4	Total
Patriots	0	14	0	14	28
Seahawks	0	14	10	0	24

at University of Phoenix Stadium, Glendale, Arizona

- Date: February 1, 2015
- Game time: 4:30pm local
- Game weather: clear, 66 °F (19 °C), 49% humidity, wind S 6 miles per hour (9.7 km/h)
- Game attendance: 70,288
- Referee: Bill Vinovich
- TV announcers (NBC): Al Michaels, Cris Collinsworth & Michele Tafoya
- Gamecenter, Gamebook

Game information

First quarter

- No scoring plays

Second quarter

- NE – Brandon LaFell 11-yard pass from Tom Brady (Stephen Gostkowski kick), 9:47 (NE 7–0) Drive: 9 plays, 65 yards, 4:10
- SEA – Marshawn Lynch 3-yard run (Steven Hauschka kick), 2:16 (Tied 7–7) Drive: 8 plays, 70 yards, 4:51
- NE – Rob Gronkowski 22-yard pass from Tom Brady (Stephen Gostkowski kick), 0:31 (NE 14–7) Drive: 8 plays, 80 yards, 1:45
- SEA – Chris Matthews 11-yard pass from Russell Wilson (Steven Hauschka kick), 0:02 (Tied 14–14) Drive: 5 plays, 80 yards, 0:29

Third quarter

- SEA – Steven Hauschka 27-yard field goal, 11:09 (SEA 17–14) Drive: 7 plays, 72 yards, 3:51
- SEA – Doug Baldwin 3-yard pass from Russell Wilson (Steven Hauschka kick), 4:54 (SEA 24–14) Drive: 6 plays, 50 yards, 3:13

Fourth quarter

- NE – Danny Amendola 4-yard pass from Tom Brady (Stephen Gostkowski kick), 7:55 (SEA 24–21) Drive: 9 plays, 68 yards, 4:15
- NE – Julian Edelman 3-yard pass from Tom Brady (Stephen Gostkowski kick), 2:02 (NE 28–24) Drive: 10 plays, 64 yards, 4:50

Top passers

- NE – Tom Brady: 37/50, 328 yds, 4 TD, 2 INT
- SEA – Russell Wilson: 12/21, 247 yds, 2 TD, 1 INT

Top rushers

- NE – LeGarrette Blount: 14 car, 40 yds
- SEA – Marshawn Lynch: 24 car, 102 yds, 1 TD

Top receivers

- NE – Julian Edelman: 9 rec, 109 yds, 1 TD
- SEA – Chris Matthews: 4 rec, 109 yds, 1 TD

Top tacklers

- NE – Jamie Collins: 6 solo, 2 asst
- SEA – Bobby Wagner: 10 solo, 2 asst, INT, pd

Team – pass – rush – total – to

The game was a back and forth battle, but best remembered for Russell Wilson throwing a game-sealing interception at the one-yard line on 2nd and 1 instead of going for a Marshawn Lynch rushing touchdown. The decision was highly scrutinized; Pete Carroll stated "You've trained your players to do the right thing, and I trust them to do right." This marked both their last Super Bowl appearance until 2025, and their most recent loss to the Patriots.
