= St. Thomas of Villanova (disambiguation) =

St. Thomas of Villanova (1488–1555) was a Spanish Augustinian friar.

St. Thomas of Villanova may also refer to:

- St. Thomas of Villanova College in King City, Ontario, Canada
- St. Thomas of Villanova Catholic Secondary School, in LaSalle, Ontario, Canada
- St. Thomas of Villanova Church on the campus of Villanova University in Villanova, Pennsylvania
