= Luke Willson =

Canadian gridiron football player (born 1990)

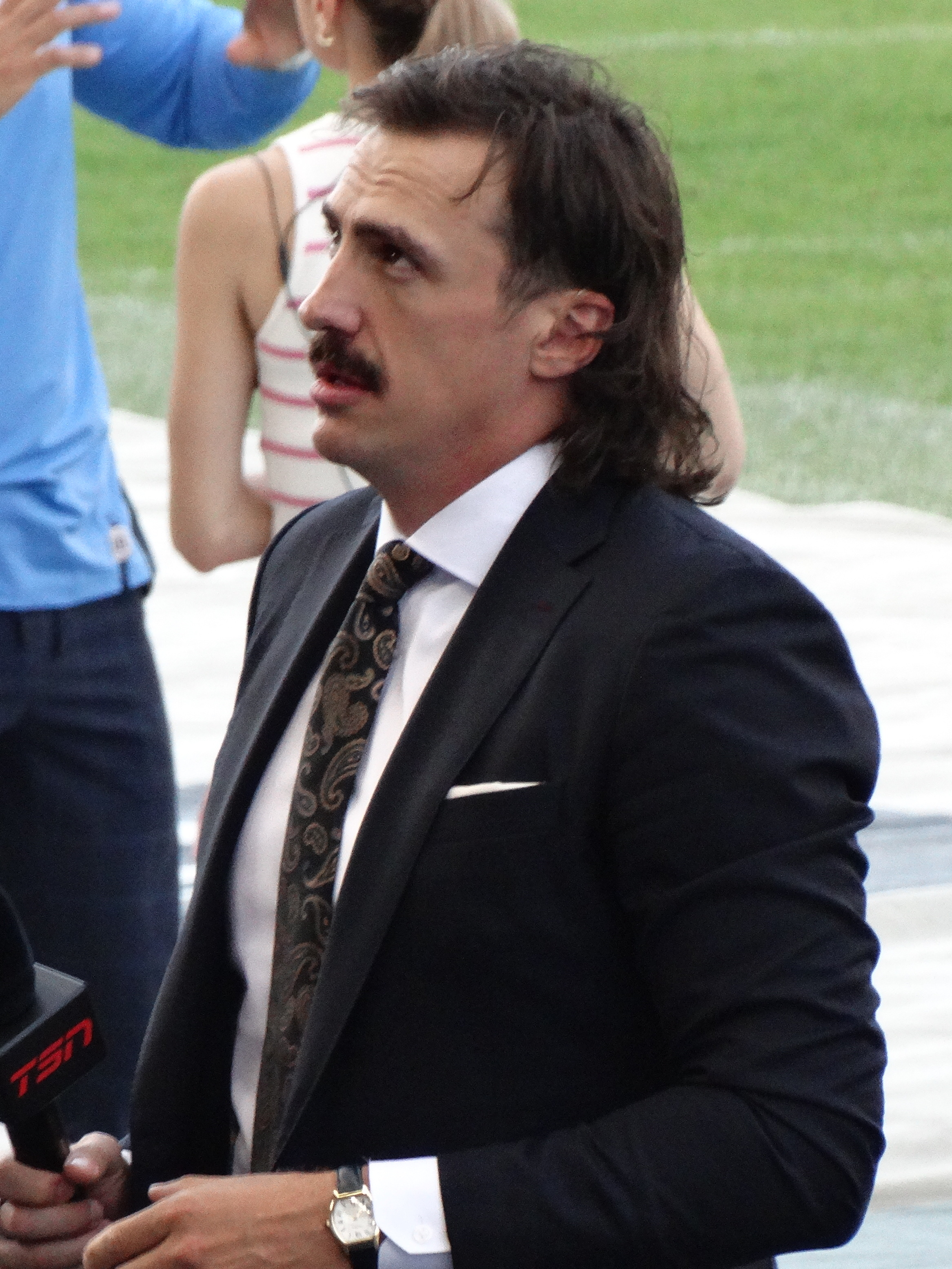
- Willson in 2025

Personal information
- Born: January 15, 1990 (age 36); LaSalle, Ontario, Canada
- Listed height: 6 ft 5 in (1.96 m)
- Listed weight: 255 lb (116 kg)

Career information
- Position: Tight end (No. 82)
- High school: St. Thomas of Villanova (LaSalle, Ontario)
- College: Rice (2008–2012)
- NFL draft: 2013: 5th round, 158th overall pick
- CFL draft: 2012: 5th round, 32nd overall pick

Career history
- Seattle Seahawks (2013–2017); Detroit Lions (2018); Oakland Raiders (2019)*; Seattle Seahawks (2019–2020); Baltimore Ravens (2020); Seattle Seahawks (2020)
- * Offseason or practice squad member only

Awards and highlights
- Super Bowl champion (XLVIII)

Career NFL statistics
- Receptions: 111
- Receiving yards: 1,307
- Receiving touchdowns: 11
- Stats at Pro Football Reference

Luke Michael Willson (born January 15, 1990) is a Canadian former professional football player who was a tight end in the National Football League (NFL).

Willson played his first five seasons in the NFL for the Seattle Seahawks where he won Super Bowl XLVIII. After spending the 2018 season with the Detroit Lions, Willson then had an offseason stint with the Oakland Raiders in 2019 before rejoining the Seahawks during the regular season. In 2020, Willson played for the Baltimore Ravens for part of the regular season before joining the Seahawks for the third time near the end of the season. Despite signing an extension with the Seahawks, he retired during the 2021 offseason.

Willson played with the Canadian Junior National baseball team in 2008. In 2011, he signed with the Toronto Blue Jays organization, but decided to return to football.

== Early life ==
Willson attended St. Thomas of Villanova Catholic Secondary School in LaSalle, Ontario, near Windsor, and was all-conference three times in football. He had 29 receptions for 638 receiving yards along with eight receiving touchdowns in his senior season. Willson was selected as the school's athlete of the year in both his junior and senior seasons, and graduated in 2008.

== College career ==
Willson played as a tight end for Rice University each year from 2009 through 2012. His position coach at Rice was former Detroit Lions tight end David Sloan. After reporting late to camp in 2008 due to his baseball commitments in Canada, Willson redshirted as a true freshman.

=== Freshman season ===
Willson finished his redshirt freshman year with 7 receptions for 122 receiving yards and one receiving touchdown.

=== Sophomore season ===
He finished his sophomore season in 2010 with a total of 33 receptions, 425 receiving yards, and 3 receiving touchdowns.

=== Junior season ===
In 2011, he was selected to Phil Steele's midseason All-Conference USA team as tight end. He was selected to the Consensus first-team preseason All C-USA and also was selected to the first-team of Dave Campbell's Texas Football All-Texas College preseason team before his junior season. He finished his junior season with 29 receptions, 313 receiving yards, and 3 receiving touchdowns.

Willson was selected by the Toronto Argonauts in the 2012 CFL draft, but did not sign.

=== Senior season ===
Willson finished his senior season in 2012 with a total of nine receptions for 126 receiving yards and two receiving touchdowns, which earned him a spot in the NFLPA Collegiate Bowl.

== Professional career ==
Pre-draft measurables
Height	Weight	Arm length	Hand span	40-yard dash	10-yard split	20-yard split	20-yard shuttle	Three-cone drill	Vertical jump	Broad jump	Bench press
6 ft 5 3/8 in (1.97 m)	251 lb (114 kg)	32 5/8 in (0.83 m)	9 1/2 in (0.24 m)	4.51 s	1.53 s	2.57 s	4.29 s	7.08 s	38.0 in (0.97 m)	10 ft 2 in (3.10 m)	23 reps
All values from Pro Day

=== Seattle Seahawks (first stint) ===
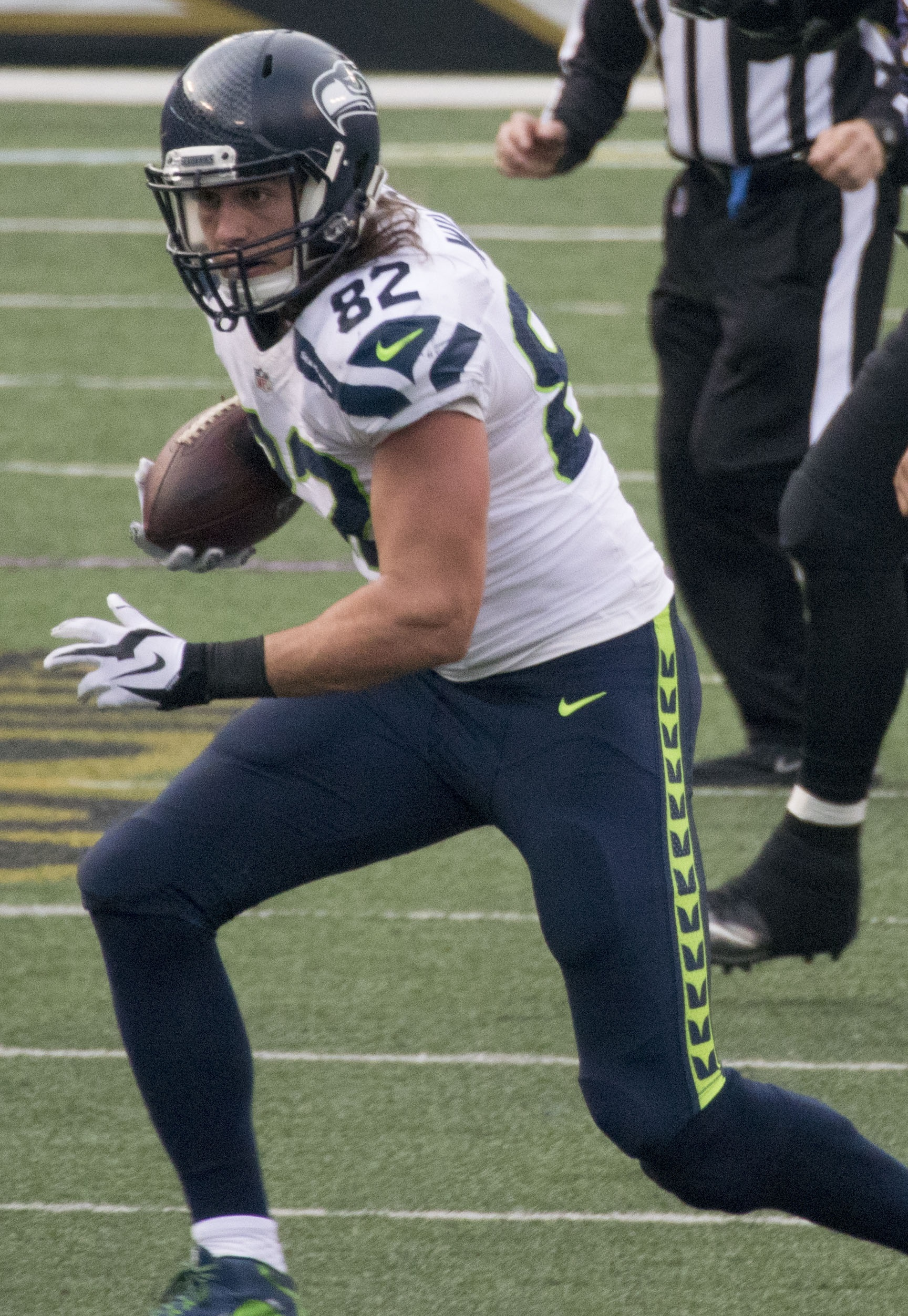
Willson with the Seahawks in 2015

He was selected by the Seattle Seahawks in the fifth round of the 2013 NFL draft out of Rice University. Willson played in every game for Seattle in 2013 and scored his first touchdown against the San Francisco 49ers. At the end of the regular season, Willson was graded as the second most valuable rookie tight end by Football Outsiders, despite being the eighth tight end selected in the 2013 NFL draft.

Willson's rookie season was capped with a blowout win in Super Bowl XLVIII; he caught two passes for 17 yards in the Seahawks' 43–8 victory over the Denver Broncos.

Willson's second season in 2014 saw an increased role when starting tight end Zach Miller was injured after a Week 4 Super Bowl rematch against Denver, eventually ending up on injured reserve. Willson caught a game-winning 23 yard touchdown pass with less than a minute left in week 8 against the Carolina Panthers. He later starred in a week 16 game against the Arizona Cardinals, catching three passes for 139 yards and two touchdowns. Willson ended the season with 22 catches for 362 yards and three touchdowns.

In that season's playoffs, Willson caught four passes for 68 yards and a touchdown in a divisional round game against the Carolina Panthers. A week later, he caught a key two-point conversion in the NFC Championship Game against the Green Bay Packers, as the Seahawks rallied to defeat the Packers 28–22 to reached consecutive Super Bowls. In Super Bowl XLIX, Willson had no catches as the Seahawks failed to repeat as champions, defeated 28–24 by the New England Patriots, who rallied in the fourth quarter behind quarterback Tom Brady.

On March 17, 2017, Willson re-signed with the Seahawks.

=== Detroit Lions ===
After five years in Seattle, Willson signed a one-year, $2.5 million contract with the Detroit Lions on March 21, 2018.

=== Oakland Raiders ===
On March 29, 2019, Willson was signed by the Oakland Raiders, but was released during final roster cuts on August 30.

=== Seattle Seahawks (second stint) ===
On September 25, 2019, Willson was signed by the Seahawks after they traded tight end Nick Vannett to the Pittsburgh Steelers.

Willson re-signed with the Seahawks on April 21, 2020, and was released on November 3.

=== Baltimore Ravens ===
On November 17, 2020, Willson was signed to the Baltimore Ravens' practice squad. He was elevated to the active roster on November 21 for the team's week 11 game against the Tennessee Titans, and reverted to the practice squad after the game. He was elevated to the active roster on December 2 for the team's week 12 game against the Pittsburgh Steelers, and reverted to the practice squad after the game. He was promoted to the active roster on December 4, and waived on December 19.

=== Seattle Seahawks (third stint) ===
On December 30, 2020, Willson signed with the practice squad of the Seahawks. He was promoted to the active roster on January 6, 2021.

Willson re-signed with the Seahawks on August 24, 2021. He announced his retirement the next day, citing a heart-related condition.

== Personal life ==
Willson has attributed his success in life to being a part of the Catholic Church.

Willson had a Tuesday guest spot with BJ & Migs Mornings on 99.9 KISW "The Rock of Seattle" radio station titled "The End Zone with Luke Willson."

He has also appeared several times as an NFL analyst on Canadian sports television network TSN during the 2022-23 season and playoffs. In 2025, Willson joined the CFL on TSN as a sideline analyst and he continues to make appearances on TSN as an in-studio analyst on SportsCentre, SC with Jay Onrait, OverDrive and CTV/TSN’s NFL broadcasts.

In October 2025, Willson's podcast, "Film Never Lies", debuted. The weekly podcast covers his life in professional football with guests from across sports and pop culture, including former teammates Marshawn Lynch and Jimmy Graham, Alphonso Davies, Michael Saunders and Tyrone Crawford.

In 2026, Willson joined the coaching staff of the University of Guelph Gryphons, as a halfback and tight ends coach.
