= Cooper Helfet =

American football player (born 1989)

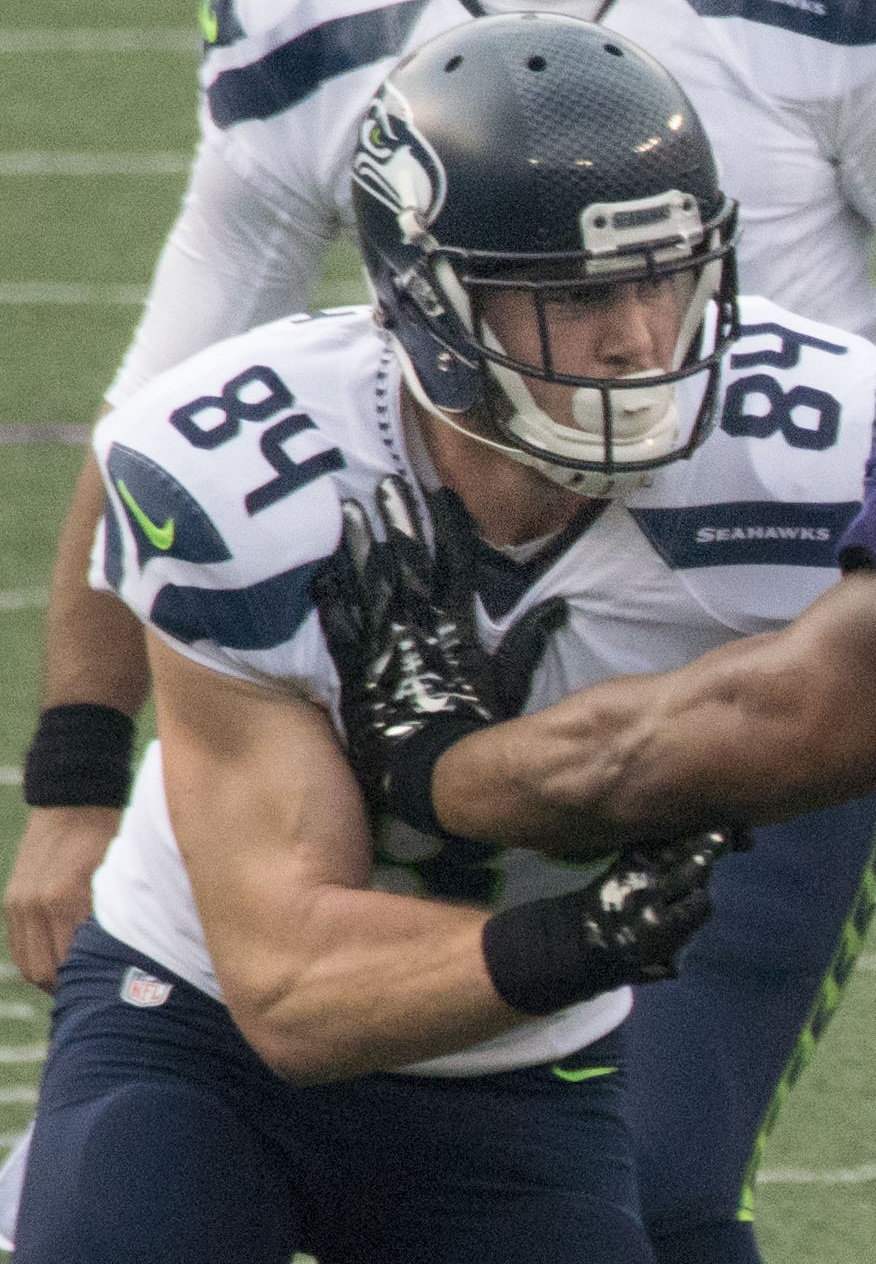
- Helfet with the Seattle Seahawks in 2015

No. 84
- Position: Tight end

Personal information
- Born: June 2, 1989 (age 37); Kentfield, California, U.S.
- Listed height: 6 ft 3 in (1.91 m)
- Listed weight: 239 lb (108 kg)

Career information
- High school: Redwood (Larkspur, California)
- College: Duke
- NFL draft: 2012: undrafted

Career history
- Seattle Seahawks (2012–2015); Oakland Raiders (2016–2017)*
- * Offseason or practice squad member only

Awards and highlights
- Super Bowl champion (XLVIII)

Career NFL statistics
- Receptions: 25
- Receiving yards: 315
- Receiving touchdowns: 2
- Stats at Pro Football Reference

Cooper Winston Helfet (born June 2, 1989) is an American former professional football player who was a tight end in the National Football League (NFL). He played college football for the Duke Blue Devils and was signed by the Seattle Seahawks as an undrafted free agent in 2012.

== Early life ==
Helfet attended Mark Day School for elementary and middle school and Redwood High School, where he played football, basketball, and lacrosse. As a senior, he recorded 42 receptions for 811 yards and earned first-team all-conference honors. He was lightly recruited by college football scouts, only receiving attention from FCS football programs including the University of San Diego and various Ivy League programs. However, he committed to Johns Hopkins University on a full lacrosse scholarship.

== College career ==
=== Johns Hopkins University ===
Helfet accepted a full lacrosse scholarship to Johns Hopkins University, where he played lacrosse for the Blue Jays in the fall of 2007. After one semester at Johns Hopkins, Helfet transferred to Santa Rosa Junior College with hopes of pursuing a football career.

=== Santa Rosa Junior College ===
Helfet started his collegiate career at Santa Rosa Junior College in Santa Rosa, California. He was one of the very few junior college players ever to transfer to Duke University.

=== Duke University ===
In his junior year, which was his first season at Duke, he was named as an honorable mention All-ACC. In his senior season, he was among the players named to the 33-member watch list for the John Mackey Award. He was selected to the pre-season All-ACC by both Lindy's Sports second-team and Athlon Sports third-team also prior to his senior season.

== Professional career ==
Pre-draft measurables
Height	Weight	40-yard dash	10-yard split	20-yard split	20-yard shuttle	Three-cone drill	Vertical jump	Broad jump	Bench press
6 ft 3 3/8 in (1.91 m)	240 lb (109 kg)	4.71 s	1.63 s	2.69 s	4.22 s	6.82 s	32.0 in (0.81 m)	9 ft 11 in (3.02 m)	24 reps
All values from Pro Day

=== Seattle Seahawks ===
On May 16, 2012, Helfet signed with the Seattle Seahawks as an undrafted free agent. On August 31, he was released by Seattle as a part of final roster cuts.

On January 17, 2013, Helfet re-signed with the Seahawks on a reserve/futures contract. On August 31, he was released by the Seahawks during final roster cuts. On September 2, Helfet was re-signed to the team's practice squad.

On February 5, 2014, Helfet was signed to a reserve/future contract with Seattle. He would remain on the Seahawks for the 2015 season and part of the 2016 season.

=== Oakland Raiders ===
On October 11, 2016, Helfet was signed to the Oakland Raiders' practice squad. He signed a reserve/future contract with the Raiders on January 9, 2017. On July 25, the Raiders placed Helfet on the Non-Football Injury list. He was released by Oakland on September 2.
