= Dion Bailey =

American football player (born 1992)

No. 34, 37
- Position: Safety

Personal information
- Born: March 2, 1992 (age 34); Carson, California, U.S.
- Listed height: 6 ft 0 in (1.83 m)
- Listed weight: 211 lb (96 kg)

Career information
- High school: Lakewood (Lakewood, California)
- College: USC
- NFL draft: 2014: undrafted

Career history
- Seattle Seahawks (2014–2015); New York Jets (2015)

Awards and highlights
- 2× Second-team All-Pac-12 (2011, 2013); Pac-12 Defensive Freshman of the Year (2011)

Career NFL statistics
- Total tackles: 22
- Sacks: 0.5
- Pass deflections: 2
- Stats at Pro Football Reference

Dion Bailey (born March 2, 1992) is an American former professional football player who was a safety in the National Football League (NFL). He was signed by the Seattle Seahawks as an undrafted free agent in 2014. He played college football at USC.

== College career ==
Bailey attended the University of Southern California from 2010 to 2013. After redshirting as a freshman in 2010, he switched to linebacker, where he started as a freshman and sophomore. As a freshman, he was the Pac-12 Defensive Freshman of the Year. He finished the season with 81 tackles, two sacks and two interceptions. As a sophomore, he started all 13 games, recording 80 tackles, four interceptions and a sack. As a junior, he moved back to safety. He finished his junior season with 61 tackles and five interceptions. After the season, at the recommendation of his agent Joey "SSF" Ingraham, he announced that he would forgo his senior season and enter the 2014 NFL draft.

== Professional career ==
Pre-draft measurables
Height	Weight	Arm length	Hand span	40-yard dash	10-yard split	20-yard split	20-yard shuttle	Three-cone drill	Vertical jump	Broad jump
6 ft 0 in (1.83 m)	201 lb (91 kg)	32 in (0.81 m)	9 1/2 in (0.24 m)	4.66 s	1.64 s	2.64 s	4.15 s	6.97 s	34.0 in (0.86 m)	9 ft 5 in (2.87 m)
All values from NFL Combine.

=== Seattle Seahawks ===
Bailey signed with the Seattle Seahawks after going unselected in the 2014 NFL draft. The Seahawks waived/injured him on August 5, 2014, but was placed on the team's injured reserve after clearing waivers the next day. He was later released with an injury settlement. Bailey was signed to the Seahawks' practice squad on October 4, 2014. He was waived on September 26, 2015.

=== New York Jets ===
Bailey was claimed off waivers by the New York Jets on September 28, 2015.

Bailey was waived/injured by the New York Jets on August 30, 2016. After going unclaimed on waivers, Bailey reverted to the team's injured reserve list. After reaching an injury settlement with the Jets, Bailey was released from the reserve list on September 2, 2016.
