= Garrett Scott =

American football player (born 1991)

No. 75
- Position: Offensive tackle

Personal information
- Born: November 14, 1991 (age 34); Douglas, Georgia, U.S.
- Listed height: 6 ft 5 in (1.96 m)
- Listed weight: 294 lb (133 kg)

Career information
- High school: Coffee (Douglas, Georgia)
- College: Marshall
- NFL draft: 2014: 6th round, 199th overall pick

Career history
- Seattle Seahawks (2014)

Awards and highlights
- Second-team All-C-USA (2013)
- Stats at Pro Football Reference

Garrett Scott (born November 14, 1991) is an American former football offensive tackle. He was selected by the Seattle Seahawks in the sixth round of the 2014 NFL draft. He played college football at Marshall.

== Professional career ==
Scott was selected with the 199th overall pick in the sixth round of the 2014 NFL draft by the Seattle Seahawks.

On May 22, 2014, Scott signed a rookie contract with the Seahawks. However, he was released the next day as a result of a rare heart condition. Despite being cut by the Seahawks, Scott was still paid his $100,000 signing bonus in full.
