= St. Thomas of Villanova Catholic Secondary School =

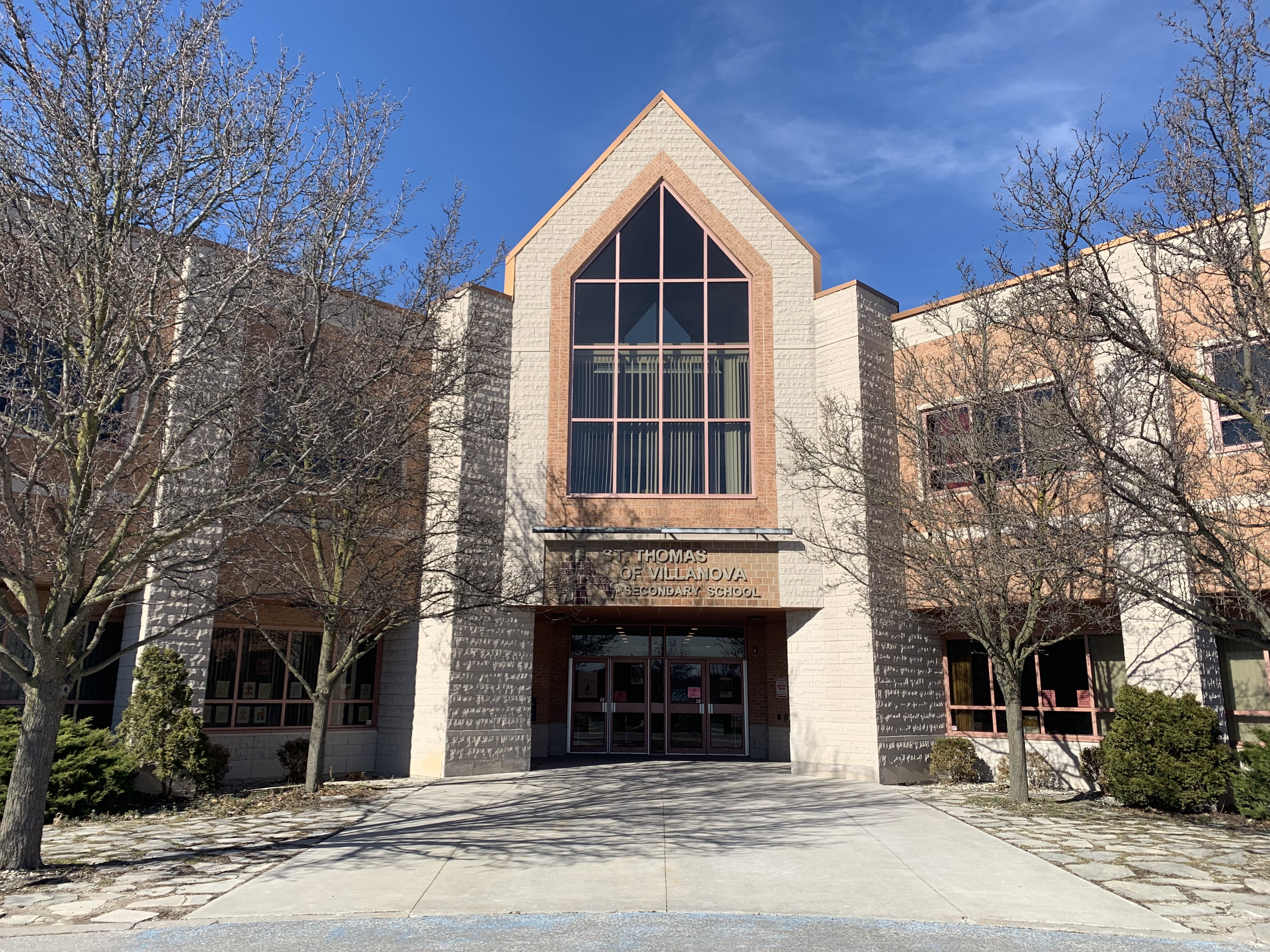
- St. Thomas of Villanova Catholic High School, in 2021

Location
- 2800 County Road #8; LaSalle, Ontario, N9A 6Z6; Canada; 42.1863°N 83.0397°W

Information
- School type: High school
- Religious affiliation: Roman Catholic
- School board: Windsor-Essex Catholic District School Board
- Superintendent: John Ulicny
- Area trustee: Frank DiTomasso
- School number: 864170
- Principal: Danielle Desjardins
- Grades: 9-12
- Enrollment: 1319
- Language: English
- Colours: Powder Blue, Silver
- Team name: Wildcats
- Website: www.wecdsb.on.ca/232/ villywildcats.wixsite.com/home
- Last updated: August 6, 2024

St. Thomas of Villanova Catholic Secondary School is a publicly funded high school in LaSalle, Ontario, Canada. It is operated by the Windsor-Essex Catholic District School Board and serves as the primary Catholic secondary school in the LaSalle, Amherstburg, and River Canard areas of Essex County. It is located on the border between LaSalle and Amherstburg. The school's mascot is the Wildcat. Villanova's Men's Baseball team has captured numerous titles at both the OFSAA-level and MHSAA-level. The school also offers other sports teams, including football, wrestling, soccer, volleyball, basketball, swimming, many of which compete at the provincial level. The Vocal, Drama, and Music programs collaboratively put on productions annually.

== Notable alumni ==
- Michael DiPietro, NHL drafted goaltender
- Luke Willson, NFL tight end with the Baltimore Ravens
- Zack Kassian, NHL player with the Edmonton Oilers

== See also ==
- Education in Ontario
- List of secondary schools in Ontario
