= Miracle at the New Meadowlands =

2010 notable punt return in American football

The Miracle at the New Meadowlands
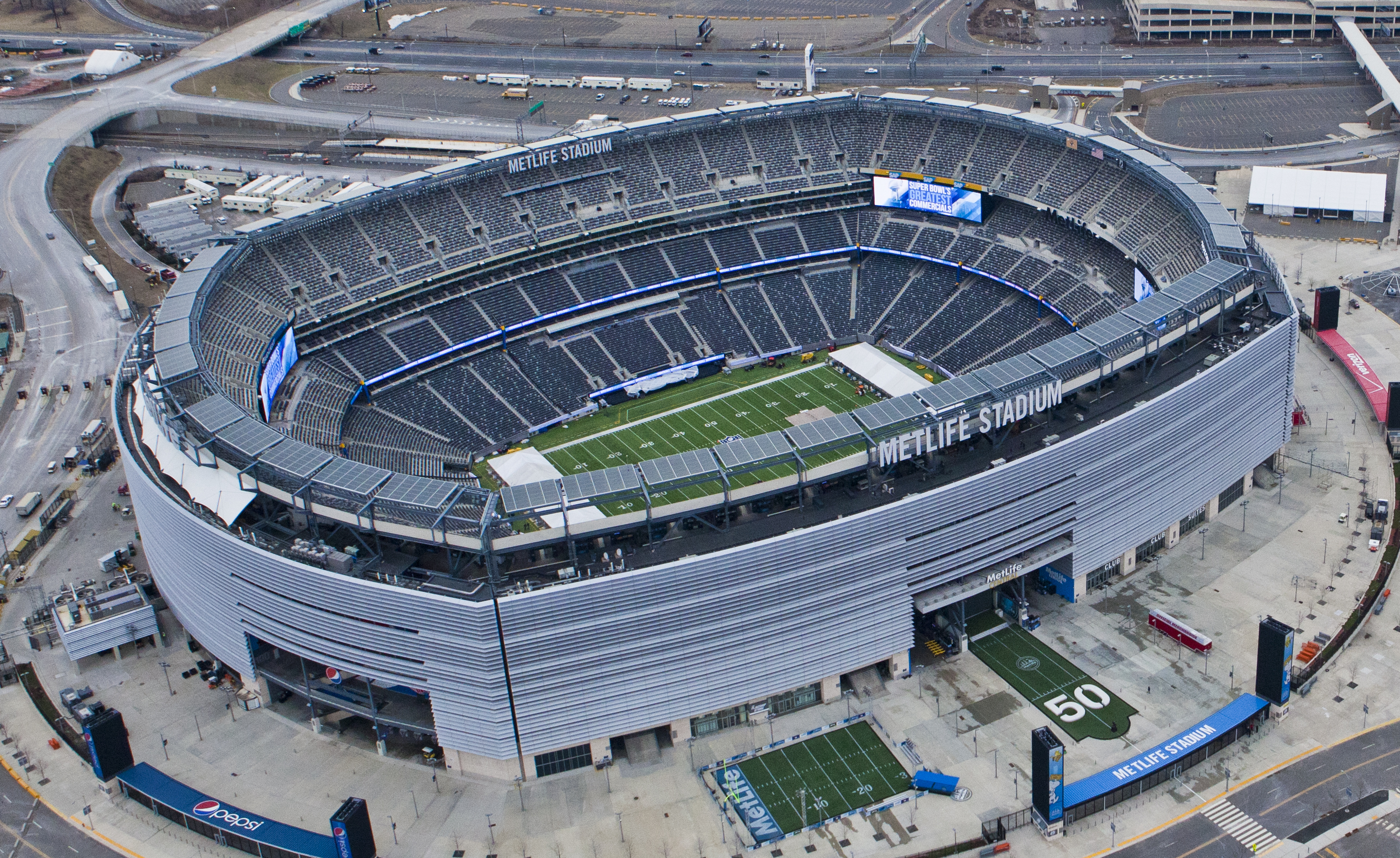
- MetLife Stadium, then named New Meadowlands Stadium, where the game took place in 2010
Philadelphia Eagles (9–4)	New York Giants (9–4)
38	31
Head coach: Andy Reid	Head coach: Tom Coughlin
	1	2	3	4	Total
PHI	0	3	7	28	38
NYG	7	17	0	7	31
- Date: December 19, 2010
- Stadium: New Meadowlands Stadium; East Rutherford, New Jersey
- Favorite: Giants by 3
- Referee: John Parry
- Attendance: 81,223

TV in the United States
- Network: Fox
- Announcers: Joe Buck, Troy Aikman and Pam Oliver

The Miracle at the New Meadowlands, also called "New Miracle at the New Meadowlands" and "Miracle at the Meadowlands II" was an improbable come-from-behind win by the Philadelphia Eagles over the New York Giants at New Meadowlands Stadium on December 19, 2010. The game was a crucial one in the context of the season, played between two divisional rivals in Week 15 of the 2010 NFL season. With just over eight minutes to play in the fourth quarter, the Eagles trailed the Giants by 21 points. They went on to score four unanswered touchdowns in the final seven minutes and 28 seconds of play, including a punt returned for a touchdown by DeSean Jackson as time expired. Jackson became the first player in NFL history to win a game by scoring on a punt return as time expired. The win allowed the Eagles to progress to the 2010 NFL playoffs by head-to-head tiebreaker over the Giants, where they lost to the eventual Super Bowl champion Green Bay Packers. The Giants did not qualify for the playoffs despite achieving a 10–6 record, losing the final wild-card spot to the Packers, a team they would lose to the very next week.

The game was ranked No. 1 of the 2010 NFL regular season by the NFL, and on April 9, 2013, NFL.com readers voted Jackson's game-winning punt return the greatest play of all time.

This game is also known as "The Punt" by Giants fans, in a similar way that the Miracle at the Meadowlands is known as "The Fumble".

== Game summary ==
=== First quarter ===
The Giants won the toss and chose to receive, but their first possession resulted in a punt after going three-and-out. The Eagles offense took the field for the first time, with the ball spotted at their own 29-yard line. After an incomplete pass, quarterback Michael Vick threw a pass intended for wide receiver DeSean Jackson, but it was picked off by cornerback Corey Webster who returned it to the Eagles 42-yard line. The Giants were unable to capitalize on the turnover, as linebacker Moise Fokou sacked quarterback Eli Manning putting them out of field goal range and forcing them to punt. After the Eagles failed to get anything going on the ensuing drive, the Giants put together a 71-yard scoring drive that ended with Manning finding wide receiver Mario Manningham for a 35-yard touchdown pass to put the Giants on the board, leading 7–0. Near the end of the quarter, safety Quintin Mikell picked off Manning's pass to wide receiver Derek Hagan and ran it back to the Giants 45-yard line. The final play of the first quarter resulted in a run by Vick for 11 yards and a personal foul called on tackle Jonathan Goff which moved the ball to the Giants 19-yard line.

=== Second quarter ===
The Eagles' drive carried over from the previous quarter. A completed pass and a run moved the Eagles to the 12-yard line. But on third down, Vick was sacked for a 4-yard loss by defensive tackle Rocky Bernard, forcing the Eagles to settle for a 34-yard field goal from kicker David Akers. The Giants received the ball and started at their own 21-yard line, whereupon they put together an 8-play, 79-yard drive. Running back Ahmad Bradshaw ran three times for 24 yards. The drive ended on Manning's second touchdown pass to Manningham, this one for 33 yards putting the Giants in the driver's seat, 14–3. The Giants once again stopped the Eagles on their next drive and received the ball. Two passes to Hagan for 27 yards and 11-yard run by Bradshaw helped the Giants get to the Eagles 7-yard line. The Giants were unable to score on third down because of an incomplete pass to tight end Kevin Boss. The Giants settled for a 25-yard field goal from kicker Lawrence Tynes to make the score 17–3. The Eagles tried to get something going on the next drive and it appeared they did when Vick found wide receiver Jeremy Maclin, but the ball came loose before he hit the ground. Safety Kenny Phillips recovered it and ran it to the Eagles 8-yard line. The Eagles called a timeout to try to get the replay assistant to take a look at the play since it was now under two minutes in the half, but the play was reviewed and it was determined to be a fumble. The Giants took advantage of this and on the next play, Manning found wide receiver Hakeem Nicks for an 8-yard touchdown pass putting the Giants in total control at halftime 24–3.

=== Third quarter ===
After the first drives of the quarter by both teams failed, the Eagles received the ball and tried to drive downfield. They got to the Giants' 42 before two costly penalties on tight end Brent Celek forced them to punt. On the next drive, Manning found Manningham but the ball came loose and defensive tackle Mike Patterson recovered it for the Eagles on the Giants 25-yard line. After a run and a pass, Vick threw an 8-yard touchdown pass to Maclin to make the score 24–10 and keep the Eagles in the game.

=== Fourth quarter ===
Both teams punted once in the opening minutes of the fourth quarter, giving the Eagles the ball with 12:48 remaining in the game. With first down at the 20-yard line, Vick dropped back and passed to Jackson, who advanced to the Eagles' 49-yard line before losing the football as he hit the ground. The Giants' Kenny Phillips picked up the loose ball and advanced it to the Eagles' 47-yard line. Replays showed that linebacker Jonathan Goff touched Jackson's jersey as he was falling, meaning that the call on the field of a fumble was incorrect. However, Eagles head coach Andy Reid neglected to challenge the call on the field and the Giants took possession. On third down and 4 from the Eagles' 8-yard line, Manning hit Boss in the back of the end zone to give the Giants a 31–10 lead with 8:17 remaining in the game.

Prior to the ensuing kickoff, the Giants stadium public address system played the Eagles' fight song, "Eye of the Tiger" as a means of mocking the Eagles.

After opening up the next drive with a pass to Maclin that brought the Eagles to their own 35-yard line, Vick dropped back and completed a pass downfield to Celek, who blew by a missed tackle from Phillips and made his way into the end zone for a 65-yard touchdown that brought the score to 31–17 with 7:28 left in the game.

On the ensuing kickoff, after both teams lined up in regular kickoff formations, Akers placed an onside kick on the left side of the field, which was caught by wide receiver Riley Cooper and advanced to the Eagles' 43-yard line. Particularly noteworthy about the play was that the Eagles only had 10 men on the field – four to Akers' right and five to his left – and that the Giants' front line of blockers on the return was lined up 15 yards away from the tee, rather than the usual 10. It was unclear whether the Eagles intentionally had only 10 men on the field, as Giants special teams captain Chase Blackburn stated after the game that he believed it was on purpose. On the second play of the ensuing drive, Vick escaped a New York blitz and rushed all the way down to the Giants' six-yard line. After two incomplete passes, with an offsides on Tuck in between, Vick ran the ball into the end zone on third and goal from the four-yard line, making the score 31–24 with 5:28 left in the game.

A short kickoff by Akers and a good runback by return man DJ Ware gave the Giants the ball on their own 35-yard line, and a pass from Manning to Manningham and three straight runs by Bradshaw gave the Giants two first downs, forcing the Eagles to use all three of their timeouts. However, on second and six from the Eagles 38-yard line, tackle David Diehl committed a false start penalty, backing the Giants up to second and 11. A three-yard run by Bradshaw and an incomplete pass by Manning on third down left the Giants just outside Tynes' range for a field goal and forced the Giants to punt. The ensuing fair catch by Maclin gave the Eagles the ball at their own 12-yard line with 3:01 remaining in the game.

After two incomplete passes to begin the drive, Vick escaped a blitz by scrambling to his left for 33 yards before stepping out of bounds at the Eagles' 45-yard line. A pass to Avant and another scramble by Vick set the Eagles up at the 20-yard line at the two-minute warning. Facing second and three from the 13-yard line, Vick passed to Maclin on the left side, and Maclin shook a tackle from cornerback Terrell Thomas and reached the end zone, tying the game at 31–31 with 1:16 remaining.

Once again, Akers' kick and Ware's return placed the Giants in good field position, with Manning beginning the drive at the Giants 36-yard line with 1:10 left. However, the drive began with two incomplete passes, and after a third-down sack by defensive tackle Trevor Laws put the Giants at their own 29-yard line, the Giants called a timeout as the play clock was about to expire on fourth down with 12 seconds left. Officials then ruled to reset the game clock to 14 seconds as the Giants' punt team and the Eagles' punt return team came onto the field.

=== The play ===
The snap from long snapper Zak DeOssie to punter Matt Dodge was high, and Dodge hastily kicked a line drive punt to Jackson rather than kicking the ball out of bounds. Jackson received the ball at the Eagles 35-yard line and immediately muffed the catch before picking the ball up and backpedaling to the 30-yard line. (This was later claimed by some to cause the Giants' coverage to collapse, ironically assisting Jackson.) Jackson ran through a group of Giants and made it to midfield before receiving a huge block by wide receiver Jason Avant on DeOssie, leaving no one in front of Jackson on the way to the end zone (Avant actually gave himself a concussion on the block, and both players were left lying on the field for the rest of the play). Ware followed Jackson but could not catch him. After the clock hit 0:00, Jackson ran parallel to the goal line across most of the width of the field—according to Jackson after the game, because he wanted to be sure the clock had expired – before advancing into the end zone for the game-winning touchdown. With no flags on the field, Jackson threw the ball into the New Meadowlands stands in celebration as the team gathered around him near the end zone. Giants head coach Tom Coughlin was so livid he threw his play sheet and notes onto the ground and ran onto the field before Jackson even reached the end zone, yelling at Dodge for not punting the ball out of bounds. Per NFL rules at the time, Akers came out to kick the extra point and the Eagles won the game 38–31.

=== Scoring summary ===
Week 15: Philadelphia Eagles at New York Giants – Game summary

Quarter	1	2	3	4	Total
Eagles	0	3	7	28	38
Giants	7	17	0	7	31

at New Meadowlands Stadium, East Rutherford, New Jersey

- Date: December 19
- Game time: 1:00 pm. EST
- Game weather: 33 °F (1 °C), Partly Cloudy
- Game attendance: 81,223
- Referee: John Parry
- TV announcers (Fox): Joe Buck, Troy Aikman and Pam Oliver
- Game Book, NFL Network Gameday highlights Recap

Game information

First quarter

- NYG – Mario Manningham 35-yard pass from Eli Manning (Lawrence Tynes kick), Giants 7–0, Drive: 9 plays, 71 yards, 4:17.

Second quarter

- PHI – David Akers 34-yard field goal, Giants 7–3, Drive: 5 plays, 29 yards, 2:12.
- NYG – Mario Manningham 33-yard pass from Eli Manning (Lawrence Tynes kick), Giants 14–3, Drive: 8 plays, 73 yards, 4:45.
- NYG – Lawrence Tynes 25-yard field goal, Giants 17–3, Drive: 12 plays, 55 yards, 3:23.
- NYG – Hakeem Nicks 8-yard pass from Eli Manning (Lawrence Tynes kick), Giants 24–3, Drive: 1 plays, 8 yards, 0:04.

Third quarter

- PHI – Jeremy Maclin 8-yard pass from Michael Vick (David Akers kick), Giants 24–10, Drive: 3 plays, 25 yards, 1:04.

Fourth quarter

- NYG – Kevin Boss 8-yard pass from Eli Manning (Lawrence Tynes kick), Giants 31–10, Drive: 7 plays, 47 yards, 4:17.
- PHI – Brent Celek 65-yard pass from Michael Vick (David Akers kick), Giants 31–17, Drive: 2 plays, 75 yards, 0:49.
- PHI – Michael Vick 4-yard run (David Akers kick), Giants 31–24, Drive: 5 plays, 57 yards, 2:00.
- PHI – Jeremy Maclin 13-yard pass from Michael Vick (David Akers kick), Tied 31–31, Drive: 8 plays, 88 yards, 1:45.
- PHI – DeSean Jackson 65-yard punt return (David Akers kick), Eagles 38–31.

Top passers

- PHI – Michael Vick – 21/35, 242 yards, 3 touchdowns, 1 interception
- NYG – Eli Manning – 23/39, 289 yards, 4 touchdowns, 1 interception

Top rushers

- PHI – Michael Vick – 10 rushes, 130 yards, 1 touchdown
- NYG – Ahmad Bradshaw – 19 rushes, 66 yards

Top receivers

- PHI – Brent Celek – 2 receptions, 72 yards, 1 touchdown
- NYG – Mario Manningham – 8 receptions, 113 yards, 2 touchdowns

Top tacklers

- PHI – Jamar Chaney – 12 tackles, 4 assists, 1 forced fumble
- NYG – Justin Tuck – 6 tackles, 1 assist, 1.5 sack

== Calls on the last play ==
And DeSean Jackson, who has averaged, 14th-best in the NFL, 8.7 yards per return, has not returned one for a touchdown this year...waits. (Dodge gets the snap, slightly above his head, and kicks to Jackson) And it's a line drive kick. (Jackson drops the ball at the 35-yard line, picks it up, and backpedals to the 30) Jackson...bobbles it, and now has to try and recover. (Jackson breaks through a group of Giants to the Eagles' 45-yard line) DeSean Jackson... (Jackson reaches midfield, at which point Avant blocks DeOssie at the Giants' 46-yard line) GETS A BLOCK! ARE YOU KIDDING! DeSean Jackson... (Jackson runs down the sideline, arm in the air, before running parallel to the goal line, looking over his shoulder, and stepping into the end zone) ...still not in and now in for the touchdown, no flags! Un-believable! No time left! Eagles win!

— Fox's Joe Buck calling the final play of the game

Reese: Fourteen seconds to go. 31–31. Matt Dodge to punt, gets a high snap, gets it away, it's a knuckler. Jackson takes it at the 35, fumbles it, picks it up, looks for running room. He's at the 40, he's at the 45, midfield...
Quick: OH!
Reese: He's at the 40.
Quick: OH!
Reese: He's going to go! DeSean Jackson!
Quick: OH!
Reese: I don't care if he jumps, dives, he's running around and he's in the end zone, and there's no time, and the Eagles win! The Eagles win!
Quick: This is Miracle at the Meadowlands Number 2!
Reese: He ran around until all the zeros were on the clock, and the Giants fans can't believe it, and the Eagles have just pulled off the most remarkable win I have ever seen!

— Eagles broadcasters Merrill Reese and Mike Quick calling the same play for WYSP-FM in Philadelphia

== Statistics ==
Source:	Philadelphia Eagles	New York Giants
First downs	19	20
Third down efficiency	4/11	8/17
Fourth down efficiency	0/0	0/0
Total yards	418	364
Passing yards	221	264
Passing – completions/attempts	21/35	23/39
Rushing yards	197	100
Rushing attempts	21	31
Yards per rush	9.4	3.2
Penalties–yards	5–30	4–35
Sacks against–yards	3–21	2–25
Fumbles–lost	3–2	2–1
Interceptions thrown	1	1
Time of possession	26:31	33:29

=== Individual leaders ===
Philadelphia Passing
	C/ATT^{*}	Yds	TD	INT
Michael Vick	21/35	242	3	1
Philadelphia Rushing
	Car^{a}	Yds	TD	LG^{b}
Michael Vick	10	130	1	35
LeSean McCoy	10	64	0	20
Jerome Harrison	1	3	0	3
Philadelphia Receiving
	Rec^{c}	Yds	TD	LG^{b}
Brent Celek	2	72	1	65
Jeremy Maclin	7	59	2	13
DeSean Jackson	3	52	0	30
Jason Avant	3	35	0	18
LeSean McCoy	4	13	0	5
Jerome Harrison	1	7	0	7
Clay Harbor	1	4	0	4
Philadelphia Defense
	Tak/Ast/Tot^{t}	Int	Ff^{g}	Sck
Jamar Chaney	12/4/16	0	1	0.0
Moise Fokou	6/1/7	0	0	1.0
Dimitri Patterson	6/1/7	0	0	0.0
Kurt Coleman	4/0/4	0	0	0.0
Trent Cole	3/7/10	0	0	0.0
Quintin Mikell	3/4/7	1	0	0.0
Juqua Parker	3/1/4	0	0	0.0
Mike Patterson	3/0/3	0	0	0.0
Asante Samuel	2/0/2	0	0	0.0
Ernie Sims	2/0/2	0	0	0.0
Nate Allen	1/2/3	0	0	0.0
Colt Anderson	1/0/1	0	0	0.0
Brodrick Bunkley	1/0/1	0	0	0.0
Antonio Dixon	1/1/2	0	0	0.0
Joselio Hanson	1/0/1	0	0	0.0
Akeem Jordan	1/0/1	0	0	0.0
Trevor Laws	1/0/1	0	0	1.0
Darryl Tapp	1/0/1	0	0	0.0

New York Passing
	C/ATT^{*}	Yds	TD	INT
Eli Manning	23/39	289	4	1
New York Rushing
	Car^{a}	Yds	TD	LG^{b}
Ahmad Bradshaw	19	66	0	9
Brandon Jacobs	12	34	0	11
New York Receiving
	Rec^{c}	Yds	TD	LG^{b}
Mario Manningham	8	113	2	35
Hakeem Nicks	6	63	1	22
Kevin Boss	3	59	1	36
Derek Hagan	3	36	0	16
Ahmad Bradshaw	2	14	0	11
Travis Beckum	1	4	0	4
New York Defense
	Tak/Ast/Tot^{t}	Int	Ff^{g}	Sck
Michael Boley	6/1/7	0	0	0.0
Terrell Thomas	6/1/7	0	1	0.0
Justin Tuck	6/1/7	0	0	1.5
Keith Bulluck	3/1/4	0	0	0.0
Kenny Phillips	3/1/4	0	0	0.0
Jason Pierre-Paul	3/0/3	0	0	0.5
Osi Umenyiora	2/0/2	0	0	0.0
Corey Webster	2/0/2	1	0	0.0
Rocky Bernard	1/0/1	0	0	1.0
Chris Canty	1/0/1	0	0	0.0
Barry Cofield	1/0/1	0	0	0.0
Jonathan Goff	1/1/2	0	0	0.0
Deon Grant	1/1/2	0	0	0.0
Aaron Ross	1/1/2	0	0	0.0

^{*}Completions/Attempts ^{a}Carries ^{b}Long play ^{c}Receptions ^{t}Tackles ^{g}Forced Fumble

== Starting lineups ==
Philadelphia	Position	Position	New York Giants
OFFENSE
Jeremy Maclin	WR		Hakeem Nicks
Jason Peters	LT		David Diehl
Todd Herremans	LG		Rich Seubert
Mike McGlynn	C		Shaun O'Hara
Max Jean-Gilles	RG		Chris Snee
King Dunlap	RT		Kareem McKenzie
Brent Celek	TE		Kevin Boss
DeSean Jackson	WR		Derek Hagan
Michael Vick	QB		Eli Manning
LeSean McCoy	RB		Brandon Jacobs
Clay Harbor	TE	FB	Bear Pascoe
DEFENSE
Juqua Parker	LE		Justin Tuck
Mike Patterson	LDT		Barry Cofield
Antonio Dixon	RDT		Chris Canty
Trent Cole	RE		Osi Umenyiora
Ernie Sims	WLB		Michael Boley
Jamar Chaney	MLB		Jonathan Goff
Moise Fokou	SLB	DB	Deon Grant
Asante Samuel	LCB		Corey Webster
Dimitri Patterson	RCB		Terrell Thomas
Quintin Mikell	SS		Kenny Phillips
Nate Allen	FS		Antrel Rolle

== Game time and weather conditions ==
- Kickoff was at 1:03 p.m. EST (18:03 UTC).
- Weather at kickoff was 33 °F (1 °C), partly cloudy.
- Game length was 3 hrs. 16 min.

== Aftermath ==
The win allowed the Atlanta Falcons, who would beat the Seattle Seahawks 34–18 later that day, to clinch a playoff spot.

The day after, newspapers in New York had pictures of Eli Manning and other players on the Giants following the epic collapse on their covers. New York Post put on the front page cover, "GIANTS DOG IT Epic Collapse against Vick and the Eagles", in reference to Vick's conviction for participating in an illegal dog-fighting ring. The Post also printed a photo of Eagles quarterback Michael Vick and two dogs superimposed on Giants players' faces behind him. It was also discussed on morning news shows, including American Morning. Commentators in both New York and Philadelphia also held up the morning newspapers in their cities, both of which had the headline about the Eagles beating the Giants.

The result of the game would ultimately help decide the division for the Eagles. In the following week, the Green Bay Packers defeated the Giants, 45–17, enabling Philadelphia to clinch the NFC East division title. Though the Giants won their week 17 matchup against the Washington Redskins, they failed to qualify for the playoffs since the Packers, who also finished the season at 10–6, won the strength of victory tiebreaker, and went on to win Super Bowl XLV against the Pittsburgh Steelers.

Before Week 1 of the following season, Matt Dodge was released from the Giants as the team signed former New York Jets punter Steve Weatherford to take his place the following season. The Giants would struggle to a 9–7 record in 2011, yet qualify for the playoffs as the NFC's #4 seed by virtue of winning the NFC East division and would eventually win Super Bowl XLVI against the New England Patriots. Dodge himself would never punt again in the NFL.

== See also ==
- Eagles–Giants rivalry
- Miracle at the Meadowlands
- List of nicknamed NFL games and plays
