= 2010 New York Giants season =

86th season in franchise history; first in New Meadowlands Stadium

- Owner: John Mara; Steve Tisch
- General manager: Jerry Reese
- Head coach: Tom Coughlin
- Home stadium: New Meadowlands Stadium

Results
- Record: 10–6
- Division place: 2nd NFC East
- Playoffs: Did not qualify
- All-Pros: S Antrel Rolle (2nd team); OG Chris Snee (2nd team); DE Justin Tuck(2nd team); DE Osi Umenyiora (2nd team)
- Pro Bowlers: C Shaun O'Hara; LS Zak DeOssie; S Antrel Rolle; OG Chris Snee; DE Justin Tuck

Uniform
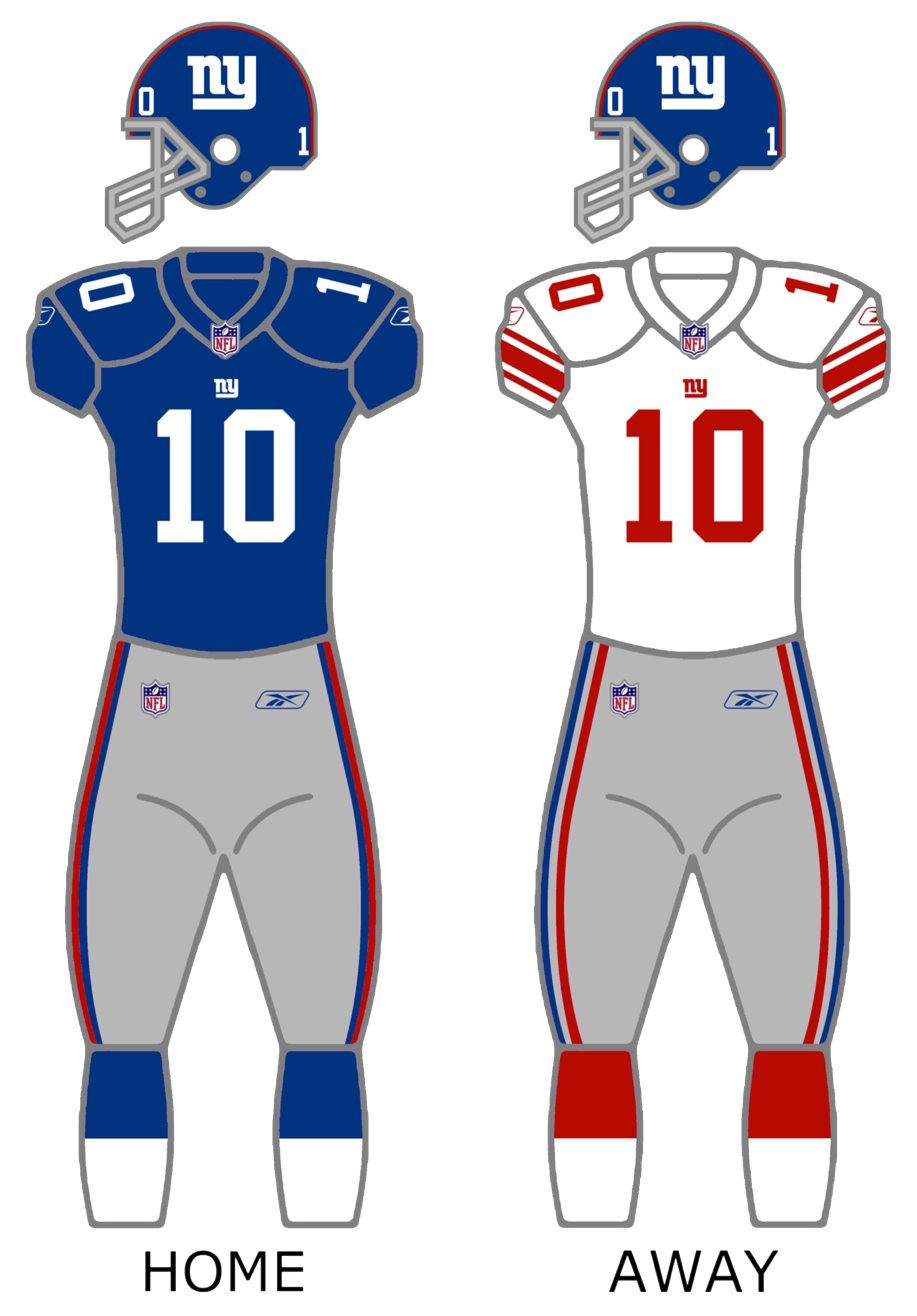

The 2010 season was the New York Giants' 86th in the National Football League (NFL) and their first season playing home games at New Meadowlands Stadium. This was the Giants' seventh season under head coach Tom Coughlin. The Giants were looking to improve on their 8–8 finish in 2009 and to return to the playoffs after missing the postseason. Although New York was able to improve on their record and finish 10–6, the team was eliminated from postseason contention on the regular season's final day. The Giants dedicated their 2010 season to the memory of Bob Sheppard, the team's public address announcer from 1956 to 2005, who died on July 11, 2010.

== Offseason ==
=== Transactions ===
With the upcoming uncapped season in the NFL, several Giants players who expected to become unrestricted free agents will be restricted free agents. The first move of the team in the offseason was to renew some of the contracts of players who were on the practice squad. Also in the beginning of the offseason the team signed three new players: defensive back Courtney Brown, fullback Jerome Johnson and kicker Sam Swank. Swank will provide competition for Lawrence Tynes, the regular kicker of the team. On January 19 the team added tight end Carson Butler who was signed after being dismissed by the Cincinnati Bengals. The Giants continued to add players when on February 8 the team was awarded offensive tackle Herb Taylor via waivers. They released starting inside linebacker and defensive team captain Antonio Pierce on February 11. The team began to offer tenders to their restricted free agents in late February when all of them with the exception of cornerback Kevin Dockery and tight end Darcy Johnson were offered them. On March 5 the Giants made the biggest free agency acquisition of the year so far with the signing of safety Antrel Rolle to a five-year, 37 million dollar contract making him one of the highest paid safeties in NFL history. Following the signing of Rolle the team waived safeties Aaron Rouse and Londen Fryar. In early March the Giants lost their backup quarterback David Carr to the San Francisco 49ers and veteran defensive tackle Fred Robbins to the St. Louis Rams.

On March 9 the team signed quarterback Jim Sorgi to a one-year deal. Sorgi was the backup for Eli Manning's brother, Peyton, in Indianapolis since 2004 and was released in early March. On March 18 the Giants signed Australian punter Jy Bond. On March 22 the team lost another two players to the St. Louis Rams: tight end Darcy Johnson and cornerback Kevin Dockery signed with the team. On April 1, punter Jeff Feagles signed a one-year deal with the Giants making this his 7th season with the Giants and his 23rd season in the NFL. On the same day the Giants signed free-agent safety Deon Grant and because of it they withdrew the tender they offer to restricted free-agent C.C. Brown. On April 30, punter Jeff Feagles retired from the NFL as one of the greatest punters ever only after a month after renewing his contract. After the Rookie Minicamp, on early May, the Giants signed undrafted linebacker Micah Johnson to fill the 80-men roster for the offseason. On May 7 the team released undrafted quarterback Dominic Randolph and signed Riley Skinner to the spot as the fourth quarterback on the roster. On June 11 the team signed their first rookie, the safety Chad Jones, drafted in the third round of the Draft. To open space in the roster the team released the kicker Sam Swank.

=== Free agents ===
Position	Player	Free agency tag	Date signed/released	2010 team
S	Vince Anderson	Released	June 21, 2010	
P	Jy Bond	Released	June 21, 2010	Hartford Colonials (UFL)
OG/OT	Kevin Boothe	RFA	April 1, 2010	New York Giants
TE	Carson Butler	Released	June 21, 2010	New England Patriots
S	C. C. Brown	RFA	May 10, 2010	Detroit Lions
DT	Anthony Bryant	Released	April 12, 2010	Washington Redskins
LB	Lee Campbell	Released	June 21, 2010	
QB	David Carr	UFA	March 7, 2010	San Francisco 49ers
TE	Scott Chandler	ERFA	March 16, 2010	New York Giants
LB	Danny Clark	UFA	May 11, 2010	Houston Texans
DT	Barry Cofield	RFA	May 14, 2010	New York Giants
CB	Kevin Dockery	RFA	March 22, 2010	St. Louis Rams
P	Jeff Feagles	UFA	April 1, 2010	New York Giants
CB	Londen Fryar	Released		
WR	Derek Hagan	RFA	May 10, 2010	New York Giants
WR	Domenik Hixon	RFA	April 16, 2010	New York Giants
CB	D. J. Johnson	ERFA	April 16, 2010	New York Giants
TE	Darcy Johnson	RFA	March 22, 2010	St. Louis Rams
LB	Micah Johnson	Released	June 21, 2010	
WR	Sinorice Moss	RFA	April 14, 2010	New York Giants
LB	Antonio Pierce	Released	February 11, 2010	retired
DT	Fred Robbins	UFA	March 8, 2010	St. Louis Rams
S	Aaron Rouse	Released	March 6, 2010	Omaha Nighthawks (UFL)
K	Sam Swank	Released		
DE	Dave Tollefson	RFA	March 24, 2010	New York Giants
RB	DJ Ware	ERFA	March 15, 2010	New York Giants
OT	Guy Whimper	RFA	April 12, 2010	New York Giants
LB	Gerris Wilkinson	RFA	April 28, 2010	New York Giants
RFA: Restricted free agent, UFA: Unrestricted free agent, ERFA: Exclusive rights free agent

=== 2010 NFL draft ===
After finishing the 2009 season with an 8–8 record, the Giants hold the 15th selection in the 2010 NFL draft. The team wasn't awarded with any compensatory pick for the past offseason. In the first round of the Draft, after seeing his top targets being picked by other teams, the Giants selected DE Jason Pierre-Paul with the 15th pick of the round, adding depth to the position. In the second day of the Draft the Giants bolstered even more his defensive line by drafting defensive tackle Linval Joseph with the 46th pick in the second round. Then in the third round, with the pick 76 the Giants drafted safety Chad Jones. In the third and final day of the Draft the team drafted four players. In the fourth round the Giants drafted linebacker Phillip Dillard, supplying the biggest need in the team after the departure of Antonio Pierce. In the fifth round the Giants drafted offensive guard Mitch Petrus, their only offensive player of the whole process. In the sixth round the Giants drafted Adrian Tracy, a versatile player who can play either as defensive end and linebacker. In the final round the team picked punter Matt Dodge after some reports saying that veteran punter Jeff Feagles is in the verge of retiring himself.

2010 New York Giants draft
Round	Pick	Player	Position	College	Notes
1	15	Jason Pierre-Paul *	Defensive end	South Florida	
2	46	Linval Joseph *	Defensive tackle	East Carolina	
4	115	Phillip Dillard	Linebacker	Nebraska	
5	147	Mitch Petrus	Offensive guard	Arkansas	
6	184	Adrian Tracy	Linebacker	William & Mary	
7	221	Matt Dodge	Punter	East Carolina	
Made roster † Pro Football Hall of Fame * Made at least one Pro Bowl during career

==== Undrafted free agents ====
Following the 2010 NFL Draft the New York Giants signed with twelve undrafted free agents. They were:

- WR Duke Calhoun (Memphis)
- DT Nate Collins (Virginia)
- DE Ayanga Okpokowuruk (Duke)
- C Jim Cordle (Ohio State)
- TE Jake Ballard (Ohio State)
- S Michael Greco (Central Florida)
- WR Victor Cruz (Massachusetts)
- OT Dennis Landolt (Penn State)
- QB Dominic Randolph (Holy Cross)
- WR Tim Brown (Rutgers)
- LB Lee Campbell (Minnesota)
- CB Seth Williams (Richmond)

== Roster ==
2010 New York Giants roster
Quarterbacks (QB): 10 Eli Manning; 18 Sage Rosenfels; Running backs (RB): 44 Ahmad Bradshaw; 27 Brandon Jacobs; 28 DJ Ware; Wide receivers (WR): 84 Duke Calhoun; 83 Michael Clayton; 85 Derek Hagan; 82 Mario Manningham; 88 Hakeem Nicks; 15 Darius Reynaud; 81 Devin Thomas; Tight ends (TE): 48 Jake Ballard; 47 Travis Beckum; 89 Kevin Boss; 86 Bear Pascoe	Offensive linemen (OL): 73 Shawn Andrews T; 65 Will Beatty T; 77 Kevin Boothe G; 66 David Diehl G/T; 67 Kareem McKenzie T; 79 Jamon Meredith T; 60 Shaun O'Hara C; 62 Mitch Petrus G; 69 Rich Seubert G/C; 76 Chris Snee G; Defensive linemen (DL): 95 Rocky Bernard DT; 99 Chris Canty DT; 96 Barry Cofield DT; 93 Alex Hall DE; 97 Linval Joseph DT; 90 Jason Pierre-Paul DE; 91 Justin Tuck DE; 71 Dave Tollefson DE; 72 Osi Umenyiora DE	Linebackers (LB): 57 Chase Blackburn OLB; 59 Michael Boley OLB; 53 Keith Bulluck OLB; 55 Phillip Dillard MLB; 54 Jonathan Goff MLB; 58 Gerris Wilkinson OLB; Defensive backs (DB): 37 Michael Coe CB; 34 Deon Grant SS; 22 Brian Jackson FS; 21 Kenny Phillips SS; 26 Antrel Rolle FS; 31 Aaron Ross CB; 24 Terrell Thomas CB; 23 Corey Webster CB; 29 Brian Witherspoon CB; Special teams (ST): 51 Zak DeOssie LS; 6 Matt Dodge P; 9 Lawrence Tynes K	Practice squad: 63 Jim Cordle C; 2 Sam Giguère WR; 41 Ben Hannula S; 74 Dwayne Hendricks DT; 43 Kenny Ingram LB; 70 Ayanga Okpokowuruk DE; 33 Charles Scott RB; 36 Woodny Turenne CB; Reserve: 13 Ramses Barden WR (IR); 30 Will Blackmon CB (IR); 37 Courtney Brown CB (IR); 80 Victor Cruz WR (IR); 39 Madison Hedgecock FB (IR); 87 Domenik Hixon WR (IR); 25 Bruce Johnson CB (IR); 20 Michael Johnson FS (IR); 35 Chad Jones SS (NF-Inj.); 94 Mathias Kiwanuka OLB (IR); 61 Adam Koets C (IR); 52 Clint Sintim OLB (IR); 12 Steve Smith WR (IR); 19 Jim Sorgi QB (IR); 98 Adrian Tracy OLB (IR); Rookies in italics 53 active, 15 reserve, 8 practice squad

== Staff ==
=== Staff changes ===
- On January 4, 2010, the Giants fired first-year defensive coordinator Bill Sheridan after the Giants defense slipped as the team dropped 8 of their last 11 games and allowed 40 points on five occasions. On January 14 the team signed Perry Fewell, former interim head coach of the Buffalo Bills.
- On January 6, 2010, the Giants fired defensive line coach Mike Waufle, after a disappointing season by the Giants defensive line. On January 27 the team hired Robert Nunn to the position. Nunn was working as co-defensive line coach at the Tampa Bay Buccaneers.
- On January 29, 2010 the Giants quarterbacks coach Chris Palmer retired from the NFL to become the new head coach of the Hartford Colonials in the UFL. On February 12 the team moved wide receivers coach Mike Sullivan to quarterbacks coach.
- On February 12, 2010 the Giants moved wide receivers coach Mike Sullivan to quarterbacks coach. With this the team promoted offensive quality control coach Sean Ryan to the position.
- On February 22, 2010 the Giants hired Kevin Gilbride, Jr. to offensive quality control coach.

=== Staff ===
2010 New York Giants staff
Front office: President/CEO – John Mara; Chairman/executive vice president – Steve Tisch; Senior vice president/general manager – Jerry Reese; Vice president of player evaluation – Chris Mara; Assistant general manager – Kevin Abrams; Director of pro personnel – David Gettleman; Director of college scouting – Marc Ross; Assistant director of pro personnel – Ken Sternfeld; Head coaches: Head coach – Tom Coughlin; Offensive coaches: Offensive coordinator – Kevin Gilbride; Quarterbacks – Mike Sullivan; Running backs – Jerald Ingram; Wide receivers – Sean Ryan; Tight ends – Mike Pope; Offensive line – Pat Flaherty; Offensive line – Jack Bicknell, Jr.; Offensive quality control – Kevin Gilbride, Jr.	Defensive coaches: Defensive coordinator – Perry Fewell; Defensive line – Robert Nunn; Linebackers – Jim Herrmann; Secondary/cornerbacks – Peter Giunta; Secondary/safeties – David Merritt; Defensive quality control – Al Holcomb; Pass rush consultant – Joe Kim; Special team coaches: Special teams coordinator – Tom Quinn; Assistant special teams – Thomas McGaughey; Strength and conditioning: Strength and conditioning – Jerry Palmieri; Assistant strength and conditioning – Markus Paul

== Schedule ==
=== Preseason ===
The Giants preseason schedule was announced on March 31, 2010. The exact dates and times of the remaining preseason games were announced on April 20, together with the regular season schedule.

Week	Date	Kickoff	Opponent	Results		Game site	NFL.com recap
Week	Date	Kickoff	Opponent	Final score	Team record	Game site	NFL.com recap
1	August 16	8:00 p.m. EDT	at New York Jets	**W** 31–16	1–0	New Meadowlands Stadium	Recap
2	August 21	7:00 pm. EDT	Pittsburgh Steelers	**L** 17–24	1–1	New Meadowlands Stadium	Recap
3	August 28	7:30 pm. EDT	at Baltimore Ravens	**L** 10–24	1–2	M&T Bank Stadium	Recap
4	September 2	7:00 pm. EDT	New England Patriots	**W** 20–17	2–2	New Meadowlands Stadium	Recap

=== Regular season ===
The Giants' 2010 schedule was announced on April 20, 2010.

Week	Date	Kickoff	Opponent	Results		Game site	NFL.com recap
Week	Date	Kickoff	Opponent	Final score	Team record	Game site	NFL.com recap
1	September 12	1:00 p.m. EDT	Carolina Panthers	**W** 31–18	1–0	New Meadowlands Stadium	Recap
2	September 19	8:20 pm. EDT	at Indianapolis Colts	**L** 14–38	1–1	Lucas Oil Stadium	Recap
3	September 26	1:00 pm. EDT	Tennessee Titans	**L** 10–29	1–2	New Meadowlands Stadium	Recap
4	October 3	8:20 pm. EDT	Chicago Bears	**W** 17–3	2–2	New Meadowlands Stadium	Recap
5	October 10	1:00 pm. EDT	at Houston Texans	**W** 34–10	3–2	Reliant Stadium	Recap
6	October 17	1:00 pm. EDT	Detroit Lions	**W** 28–20	4–2	New Meadowlands Stadium	Recap
7	October 25	8:30 pm. EDT	at **Dallas Cowboys**	**W** 41–35	5–2	Cowboys Stadium	Recap
8	Bye						
9	November 7	4:05 pm. EST	at Seattle Seahawks	**W** 41–7	6–2	Qwest Field	Recap
10	November 14	4:15 pm. EST	**Dallas Cowboys**	**L** 20–33	6–3	New Meadowlands Stadium	Recap
11	November 21	8:30 pm. EST	at **Philadelphia Eagles**	**L** 17–27	6–4	Lincoln Financial Field	Recap
12	November 28	1:00 pm. EST	Jacksonville Jaguars	**W** 24–20	7–4	New Meadowlands Stadium	Recap
13	December 5	1:00 pm. EST	**Washington Redskins**	**W** 31–7	8–4	New Meadowlands Stadium	Recap
14	December 13**	7:20 pm. EST**	at Minnesota Vikings	**W** 21–3	9–4	Ford Field**	Recap
15	December 19	1:00 pm. EST	**Philadelphia Eagles**	**L** 31–38	9–5	New Meadowlands Stadium	Recap
16	December 26	4:15 pm. EST	at Green Bay Packers	**L** 17–45	9–6	Lambeau Field	Recap
17	January 2	4:15 pm. EST	at **Washington Redskins**	**W** 17–14	10–6	FedExField	Recap

COLOR KEY & NOTES:

Bold indicates division games.
** Indicates that the game time was rescheduled from December 12 to December 13 and moved to Ford Field in Detroit due to inclement weather and the roof collapse of the Hubert H. Humphrey Metrodome.

== Standings ==
NFC East
	W	L	T	PCT	DIV	CONF	PF	PA	STK
^{(3)} Philadelphia Eagles	10	6	0	.625	4–2	7–5	439	377	L2
New York Giants	10	6	0	.625	3–3	8–4	394	347	W1
Dallas Cowboys	6	10	0	.375	3–3	4–8	394	436	W1
Washington Redskins	6	10	0	.375	2–4	4–8	302	377	L1

== Regular season results ==
=== Week 1: vs. Carolina Panthers ===
Week 1: Carolina Panthers at New York Giants – Game summary

Quarter	1	2	3	4	Total
Panthers	3	13	0	2	18
Giants	7	7	10	7	31

at New Meadowlands Stadium, East Rutherford, New Jersey

- Date: September 12
- Game time: 1:00 p.m. EDT
- Game weather: 64 °F (18 °C), Light Rain
- Game attendance: 77,245
- Referee: Jerome Boger
- TV announcers (FOX): Kenny Albert, Daryl Johnston and Tony Siragusa
- Game Book Recap

Game information

First quarter

- CAR – John Kasay 21-yard field goal, Panthers 3–0, Drive: 7 plays, 26 yards, 3:39.
- NYG – Hakeem Nicks 26-yard pass from Eli Manning (Lawrence Tynes kick), Giants 7–3, Drive: 7 plays, 68 yards, 3:40.

Second quarter

- CAR – John Kasay 52-yard field goal, Giants 7–6, Drive: 7 plays, 21 yards, 3:20.
- CAR – John Kasay 43-yard field goal, Panthers 9–7, Drive: 7 plays, 39 yards, 2:07.
- NYG – Hakeem Nicks 19-yard pass from Eli Manning (Lawrence Tynes kick), Giants 14–9, Drive: 7 plays, 80 yards, 1:01.
- CAR – Steve Smith 19-yard pass from Matt Moore (John Kasay kick), Panthers 16–14, Drive: 5 plays, 50 yards, 0:42.

Third quarter

- NYG – Lawrence Tynes 32-yard field goal, Giants 17–16, Drive: 11 plays, 60 yards, 5:57.
- NYG – Hakeem Nicks 5-yard pass from Eli Manning (Lawrence Tynes kick), Giants 24–16, Drive: 5 plays, 38 yards, 2:48.

Fourth quarter

- NYG – Ahmad Bradshaw 4-yard run (Lawrence Tynes kick), Giants 31–16, Drive: 6 plays, 52 yards, 3:24.
- CAR – Punt blocked by Greg Hardy out of bounds in end zone for a Safety, Giants 31–18.

Top passers

- CAR – Matt Moore – 14/33, 182 yards, 1 touchdown, 3 interceptions
- NYG – Eli Manning – 20/30, 263 yards, 3 touchdowns, 3 interceptions

Top rushers

- CAR – DeAngelo Williams – 16 rushes, 62 yards
- NYG – Ahmad Bradshaw – 20 rushes, 76 yards, 1 touchdown

Top receivers

- CAR – Steve Smith – 5 receptions, 75 yards, 1 touchdown
- NYG – Mario Manningham – 4 receptions, 85 yards

Top tacklers

- CAR – Dan Connor – 10 tackles, 3 assists, 1 sack
- NYG – Antrel Rolle – 7 tackles, 1 assist

The Giants opened their new home in search of revenge against the Panthers, who had soundly defeated them in the last game at Giants Stadium. In the first quarter, Carolina scored the stadium's first points as kicker John Kasay got a 21-yard field goal. New York would answer with the stadium's first touchdown as quarterback Eli Manning found wide receiver Hakeem Nicks from 26 yards out. The Panthers would retake the lead in the second quarter as Kasay made field goals from 52 and 43 yards. Manning found Nicks again on a 19-yard touchdown pass with less than a minute left in the first half, but Carolina quarterback Matt Moore completed a 19-yard touchdown pass to wide receiver Steve Smith with six seconds remaining.

The Giants would get back on top in the third quarter as kicker Lawrence Tynes nailed a 32-yard field goal, followed by Nicks' third touchdown of the game (a 6-yard catch). In the fourth quarter, the Giants added one more touchdown as running back Ahmad Bradshaw ran for a 4-yard score. Carolina's Greg Hardy blocked a Matt Dodge punt out of the end zone to round out the scoring with a safety.

The Giants' historic win had come with a price, however; tight end Kevin Boss left the game in the first quarter with a concussion, and Will Beatty, who filled in for Boss afterward, was benched with a broken foot. The Giants signed tight end Bear Pascoe from their practice squad to play against the Colts.

=== Week 2: at Indianapolis Colts ===
Week 2: New York Giants at Indianapolis Colts – Game summary

Quarter	1	2	3	4	Total
Giants	0	0	7	7	14
Colts	7	17	7	7	38

at Lucas Oil Stadium; Indianapolis, Indiana

- Date: September 19
- Game time: 8:20 pm EDT
- Game weather: 74 °F (23 °C), Clear
- Game attendance: 67,275
- Referee: Bill Leavy
- TV announcers (NBC): Al Michaels, Cris Collinsworth and Andrea Kremer
- Recap

Game information

First quarter

- IND – (8:21) Donald Brown 7-yard run (Adam Vinatieri kick), Drive: 12 plays, 80 yards, 6:44. (Colts 7–0)

Second quarter

- IND – (9:43) Dallas Clark 50-yard reception from Peyton Manning (Adam Vinatieri kick), Drive: 8 plays, 98 yards, 4:24. (Colts 14–0)
- IND – (5:05) Adam Vinatieri 38-yard field goal, Drive: 8 plays, 42 yards, 4:26. (Colts 17–0)
- IND – (0:14) Austin Collie 3-yard reception from Peyton Manning (Adam Vinatieri kick), Drive: 8 plays, 45 yards, 0:58. (Colts 24–0)

Third quarter

- NYG – (10:53) Mario Manningham 54-yard reception from Eli Manning (Lawrence Tynes kick), Drive: 8 plays, 87 yards, 4:16. (Colts 24–7)
- IND – (6:35) Fili Moala 1-yard fumble return (Adam Vinatieri kick), (Colts 31–7).

Fourth quarter

- IND – (9:18) Reggie Wayne 10-yard reception from Peyton Manning (Adam Vinatieri kick), Drive: 8 plays, 55 yards, 4:02. (Colts 38–7)
- NYG – (1:52) Hakeem Nicks 31-yard reception from Eli Manning (Lawrence Tynes kick), Drive: 1 plays, 31 yards, 0:00. (Colts 38–14)

Top passers

- NYG – Eli Manning – 13/24, 161 yards, 2 TD, 1 INT
- IND – Peyton Manning – 20/26, 255 yards, 3 TD, 0 INT

Top rushers

- NYG – Ahmad Bradshaw – 17 carries, 89 yards, 0 TD
- IND – Joseph Addai – 20 carries, 92 yards, 0 TD

Top receivers

- NYG – Mario Manningham – 4 receptions, 75 yards, 1 TD
- IND – Reggie Wayne – 7 receptions, 96 yards, 1 TD

Top tacklers

- NYG – Michael Boley (15)
- IND – Kelvin Hayden (8)

The second "Manning Bowl" was only the second time in NFL history that two brothers started opposite each other at quarterback, in a game which was expected to be an offensive struggle between Eli and his older brother Peyton. But the Giants didn't seem to have an answer for Peyton or the Colts' running game, which was led by Joseph Addai and Donald Brown.

The Giants were shut out at the half for the third time in their last four games (dating back to last year) after the Colts scored the first 24 points of the night. Brown recorded a 7-yard scoring run, and Dallas Clark and Austin Collie caught touchdown passes of 50 and 3 yards, respectively. The Colts defense held the Giants to 75 yards of offense in the first half, including just 17 passing yards for Eli. The Giants finally got on the board on the first drive of the second half, when Eli connected with Mario Manningham for a 54-yard strike. But on the Giants' next drive, an Eli fumble was picked up in the end zone by Fili Moala, effectively taking the Giants out of the game. Two additional scores occurred in the fourth quarter; Peyton connected with Reggie Wayne for a 10-yard score, and Eli threw a 31-yard touchdown to Week 1 star Nicks.

On a night when almost nothing went right for the Giants, Brandon Jacobs caused a stir by throwing his helmet into the stands in the third quarter, which he later claimed was a botched expression of frustration. The NFL fined Jacobs $10,000 for the incident.

=== Week 3: vs. Tennessee Titans ===
Week 3: Tennessee Titans at New York Giants – Game summary

Quarter	1	2	3	4	Total
Titans	3	7	9	10	29
Giants	0	10	0	0	10

at New Meadowlands Stadium, East Rutherford, New Jersey

- Date: September 26
- Game time: 12:00 pm. CDT
- Game weather: 70 °F (21 °C), Cloudy
- Game attendance: 79,386
- Referee: Tony Corrente
- TV announcers (CBS): Greg Gumbel and Dan Dierdorf
- Recap Game Book

Game information

First quarter

- TEN – Rob Bironas 48-yard field goal, Titans 3–0, Drive: 7 plays, 21 yards, 3:19.

Second quarter

- TEN – Chris Johnson 1-yard run (Rob Bironas kick), Titans 10–0, Drive: 10 plays, 57 yards, 5:23.
- NYG – Lawrence Tynes 50-yard field goal, Titans 10–3, Drive: 8 plays, 38 yards, 4:31.
- NYG – Ahmad Bradshaw 10-yard run (Lawrence Tynes kick), Tied 10–10, Drive: 9 plays, 63 yards, 2:12.

Third quarter

- TEN – Chop Block penalty on Ahmad Bradshaw enforced in endzone for a safety, Titans 12–10.
- TEN – Kenny Britt 13-yard pass from Vince Young (Rob Bironas kick), Titans 19–10, Drive: 6 plays, 51 yards, 2:56.

Fourth quarter

- TEN – Rob Bironas 22-yard field goal, Titans 22–10, Drive: 12 plays, 46 yards, 5:39.
- TEN – Chris Johnson 8-yard run (Rob Bironas kick), Titans 29–10, Drive: 5 plays, 65 yards, 1:54.

Top passers

- TEN – Vince Young – 10/16, 118 yards, 1 touchdown
- NYG – Eli Manning – 34/48, 386 yards, 2 interceptions

Top rushers

- TEN – Chris Johnson – 32 rushes, 125 yards, 2 touchdowns
- NYG – Ahmad Bradshaw – 15 rushes, 88 yards, 1 touchdown

Top receivers

- TEN – Justin Gage – 3 receptions, 39 yards
- NYG – Steve Smith – 9 receptions, 103 yards

Top tacklers

- TEN – Michael Griffin – 11 tackles, 1 assist, 1 forced fumble
- NYG – Kenny Phillips – 6 tackles, 3 assists

Giants miscues were the story of this game; as head coach Tom Coughlin would later comment, "[T]he first thing you have to do is keep from beating yourself before you can beat the opponent and we didn't do that." The Giants accumulated 417 yards of offense, including 26 first downs, but scored only twice on 8 trips inside Tennessee territory.

New York quickly found themselves in a 10–0 hole after their first three possessions ended in two interceptions—one in the end zone—and a missed 53-yard field goal by Tynes. Toward the end of the first half, Tynes made a 50-yard field goal which the Giants followed up with a 10-yard Bradshaw touchdown run. But on their first drive of the second half, Bradshaw committed a chop block penalty in the end zone for a Tennessee safety. Tennessee quarterback Vince Young connected with Kenny Britt for a 13-yard touchdown on the ensuing drive, and the Titans never looked back. The Giants' next two possessions ended in a Bradshaw fumble and another Tynes miss, this one from 44 yards. The Titans added a Rob Bironas field goal and a Chris Johnson touchdown on their way to victory.

=== Week 4: vs. Chicago Bears ===
Week 4: Chicago Bears at New York Giants – Game summary

Quarter	1	2	3	4	Total
Bears	0	0	0	3	3
Giants	3	0	7	7	17

at New Meadowlands Stadium, East Rutherford, New Jersey

- Date: October 3
- Game time: 8:20 pm. EDT
- Game weather: 59 °F (15 °C), Scattered Showers
- Game attendance: 77,716
- Referee: Carl Cheffers
- TV announcers (NBC): Al Michaels, Cris Collinsworth, and Andrea Kremer
- Game Book Recap

Game information

First quarter

- NYG – Lawrence Tynes 22-yard field goal, Giants 3–0, Drive: 11 plays, 76 yards, 5:08.

Second quarter

- No scoring plays

Third quarter

- NYG – Ahmad Bradshaw 3-yard run (Lawrence Tynes kick), Giants 10–0, Drive: 8 plays, 90 yards, 5:18.

Fourth quarter

- CHI – Robbie Gould 40-yard field goal, Giants 10–3, Drive: 4 plays, 7 yards, 0:52.
- NYG – Brandon Jacobs 2-yard run (Lawrence Tynes kick), Giants 17–3, Drive: 2 plays, 32 yards, 0:50.

Top passers

- CHI – Jay Cutler – 8/11, 42 yards, 1 interception
- NYG – Eli Manning – 18/30, 195 yards

Top rushers

- CHI – Matt Forte – 12 rushes, 26 yards
- NYG – Ahmad Bradshaw – 23 rushes, 129 yards, 1 touchdown

Top receivers

- CHI – Greg Olsen – 5 receptions, 39 yards
- NYG – Hakeem Nicks – 8 receptions, 110 yards

Top tacklers

- CHI – Danieal Manning – 8 tackles, 3 assists
- NYG – Jonathan Goff – 5 tackles, 5 assists, 0.5 sack

This Sunday night featured the introduction of the Giants' Ring of Honor, which included 30 historic players, coaches, and administrators. The presence of such defensive greats as Jessie Armstead and Michael Strahan in the stadium that night is credited with inspiring Perry Fewell's struggling defensive squad.

The New York defense held the Bears to zero points, two first downs, and 22 yards of total offense in the first half, and sacked Jay Cutler nine times before knocking him out of the game with a concussion. In total, the Bears put together only six first downs (one by penalty) and finished with the lowest final score of any Giants visitor since the Eagles in 2007. The Bears went on to lose backup quarterback Todd Collins to a hard Michael Boley tackle; third-string quarterback Caleb Hanie was called upon to play the fourth quarter. Justin Tuck and Osi Umenyiora were each responsible for three sacks on the night.

Manning and the Giants offense had their own difficulties putting points on the board, but second-half touchdowns by Bradshaw and Jacobs proved enough to win this defensive struggle. Nicks also had a notable day, catching eight passes for 110 yards.

=== Week 5: at Houston Texans ===
Week 5: New York Giants at Houston Texans – Game summary

Quarter	1	2	3	4	Total
Giants	14	10	3	7	34
Texans	0	3	7	0	10

at Reliant Stadium, Houston, Texas

- Date: October 10
- Game time: 12:00 pm. CDT
- Game weather: None (retractable roof closed)
- Game attendance: 71,110
- Referee: Walt Coleman
- TV announcers (FOX): Kenny Albert, Daryl Johnston and Tony Siragusa
- Recap

Game information

First quarter

- NYG – Hakeem Nicks 6-yard pass from Eli Manning (Lawrence Tynes kick), Giants 7–0, Drive: 8 plays, 85 yards, 4:32.
- NYG – Brandon Jacobs 1-yard run (Lawrence Tynes kick), Giants 14–0, Drive: 4 plays, 40 yards, 1:59.

Second quarter

- NYG – Hakeem Nicks 12-yard pass from Eli Manning (Lawrence Tynes kick), Giants 21–0, Drive: 6 plays, 55 yards, 2:58.
- HOU – Neil Rackers 38-yard field goal, Giants 21–3, Drive: 10 plays, 35 yards, 4:09.
- NYG – Lawrence Tynes 45-yard field goal, Giants 24–3, Drive: 12 plays, 70 yards, 4:09.

Third quarter

- HOU – Derrick Ward 1-yard run (Neil Rackers kick), Giants 24–10, Drive: 2 plays, 17 yards, 0:32.
- NYG – Lawrence Tynes 42-yard field goal, Giants 27–10, Drive: 11 plays, 47 yards, 5:38.

Fourth quarter

- NYG – Steve Smith 4-yard pass from Eli Manning (Lawrence Tynes kick), Giants 34–10, Drive: 9 plays, 73 yards, 5:12.

Top passers

- NYG – Eli Manning – 27/42, 297 yards, 3 touchdowns, 2 interceptions
- HOU – Matt Schaub – 16/34, 196 yards, 1 interception

Top rushers

- NYG – Ahmad Bradshaw – 16 rushes, 67 yards
- HOU – Arian Foster – 11 rushes, 25 yards

Top receivers

- NYG – Hakeem Nicks – 12 receptions, 130 yards, 2 touchdowns
- HOU – Andre Johnson – 5 receptions, 95 yards

Top tacklers

- NYG – Antrel Rolle, Terrel Thomas – 5 tackles, 1 assist
- HOU – DeMeco Ryans – 8 tackles, 3 assists

The upstart 3–1 Texans were slightly favored in this matchup, but the Giants took control of the game right away. They scored touchdowns on three consecutive drives in the first half, including two Nicks receptions of 6 and 12 yards. This was Nicks' second consecutive 100-yard receiving game, and he was now among the top 10 receivers league-wide in receptions, receiving yards, receptions of 20+ yards, and receiving touchdowns for the season. Jacobs also contributed a 1-yard touchdown run in the first quarter. In the third quarter, former Giant Derrick Ward provided Houston with their first touchdown of the day, but the newly dominant Giants defense did not allow any further damage. Smith's 4-yard reception late in the fourth quarter sealed the victory for the Giants.

=== Week 6: vs. Detroit Lions ===
Week 6: Detroit Lions at New York Giants – Game summary

Quarter	1	2	3	4	Total
Lions	7	3	0	10	20
Giants	7	7	7	7	28

at New Meadowlands Stadium, East Rutherford, New Jersey

- Date: October 17
- Game time: 1:00 pm. EDT
- Game weather: 63 °F (17 °C), Sunny
- Game attendance: 78,341
- Referee: Jeff Triplette
- TV announcers (Fox): Dick Stockton, Charles Davis & Laura Okmin
- Game Book Recap

Game information

First quarter

- DET – Nate Burleson 14-yard pass from Shaun Hill (Jason Hanson kick), Lions 7–0, Drive: 9 plays, 43 yards, 4:00.
- NYG – Brandon Jacobs 4-yard run (Shayne Graham kick), Tied 7–7, Drive: 5 plays, 40 yards, 2:23.

Second quarter

- NYG – Mario Manningham 33-yard pass from Eli Manning (Shayne Graham kick), Giants 14–7, Drive: 11 plays, 93 yards, 6:42.
- DET – Jason Hanson 50-yard field goal, Giants 14–10, Drive: 14 plays, 48 yards, 3:14.

Third quarter

- NYG – Travis Beckum 1-yard pass from Eli Manning (Shayne Graham kick), Giants 21–10, Drive: 8 plays, 57 yards, 4:25.

Fourth quarter

- DET – Calvin Johnson 87-yard pass from Drew Stanton (Jason Hanson kick), Giants 21–17, Drive: 3 plays, 87 yards, 1:36.
- NYG – Brandon Jacobs 6-yard run (Shayne Graham kick), Giants 28–17, Drive: 3 plays, 58 yards, 1:37.
- DET – Jason Hanson 50-yard field goal, Giants 28–20, Drive: 4 plays, 8 yards, 0:34.

Top passers

- DET – Drew Stanton – 19/34, 222 yards, 1 touchdown, 1 interception
- NYG – Eli Manning – 20/30, 177 yards, 2 touchdowns

Top rushers

- DET – Drew Stanton – 3 rushes, 30 yards
- NYG – Ahmad Bradshaw – 19 rushes, 133 yards

Top receivers

- DET – Calvin Johnson – 5 receptions, 146 yards, 1 touchdown
- NYG – Steve Smith – 6 receptions, 70 yards

Top tacklers

- DET – Ashlee Palmer – 9 tackles, 4 assists
- NYG – Deon Grant – 7 tackles, 3 assist, 1 forced fumble

Hoping to increase their winning streak the Giants played at home ground for an NFC duel with the Lions. In the first quarter the Giants trailed early as quarterback Shaun Hill made a 14-yard touchdown pass to wide receiver Nate Burleson. They replied when running back Brandon Jacobs got a 4-yard touchdown run. They took the lead with quarterback Eli Manning making a 33-yard touchdown pass to wide receiver Mario Manningham. The lead was cut when kicker Jason Hanson nailed a 50-yard field goal. The Giants continued to score in the third quarter with Manning finding tight end Travis Beckum on a 1-yard touchdown pass. The Lions responded in the fourth quarter with quarterback Drew Stanton completing an 87-yard touchdown pass to wide receiver Calvin Johnson, but the Giants pulled away with Jacobs making a 6-yard touchdown run. The Lions tried to rally but only came away with another 50-yard field goal by Hanson giving the Giants the win.

With the win, the Giants improved to 4–2.

=== Week 7: at Dallas Cowboys ===
Week 7: New York Giants at Dallas Cowboys – Game summary

Quarter	1	2	3	4	Total
Giants	7	17	14	3	41
Cowboys	10	10	0	15	35

at Cowboys Stadium, Arlington, Texas

- Date: October 25
- Game time: 8:30 pm EDT (7:30 pm CDT)
- Game attendance: 91,375
- Referee: John Parry
- TV announcers (ESPN): Mike Tirico, Ron Jaworski, and Jon Gruden
- recap

Game information

First quarter

- DAL – Jason Witten 3-yard pass from Tony Romo (David Buehler kick), Cowboys 7–0, Drive: 2 plays, 5 yards, 0:49.
- DAL – David Buehler 26-yard field goal, Cowboys 10–0, Drive: 6 plays, 10 yards, 2:54.
- NYG – Hakeem Nicks 7-yard pass from Eli Manning (Lawrence Tynes kick), Cowboys 10–7, Drive: 11 plays, 79 yards, 6:10.

Second quarter

- DAL – David Buehler 41-yard field goal, Cowboys 13–7, Drive: 5 plays, 20 yards, 2:10.
- DAL – Dez Bryant 93-yard punt return (David Buehler kick), Cowboys 20–7.
- NYG – Hakeem Nicks 8-yard pass from Eli Manning (Lawrence Tynes kick), Cowboys 20–14, Drive: 7 plays, 80 yards, 4:31.
- NYG – Steve Smith 14-yard pass from Eli Manning (Lawrence Tynes kick), Giants 21–20, Drive: 5 plays, 56 yards, 2:01.
- NYG – Lawrence Tynes 53-yard field goal, Giants 24–20, Drive: 5 plays, 9 yards, 0:34.

Third quarter

- NYG – Mario Manningham 25-yard pass from Eli Manning (Lawrence Tynes kick), Giants 31–20, Drive: 5 plays, 55 yards, 2:21.
- NYG – Brandon Jacobs 30-yard run (Lawrence Tynes kick), Giants 38–20, Drive: 6 plays, 70 yards, 3:49.

Fourth quarter

- DAL – Dez Bryant 15-yard pass from Jon Kitna (Jon Kitna – Jason Witten pass), Giants 38–28, Drive: 1 plays, 15 yards, 0:05.
- NYG – Lawrence Tynes 26-yard field goal, Giants 41–28, Drive: 5 plays, 31 yards, 1:22.
- DAL – Dez Bryant 15-yard pass from Jon Kitna (David Buehler kick), Giants 41–35, Drive: 8 plays, 73 yards, 1:15.

Top passers

- NYG – Eli Manning – 25/35, 306 yards, 4 touchdowns, 3 interceptions
- DAL – Jon Kitna – 16/33, 187 yards, 2 touchdowns

Top rushers

- NYG – Ahmad Bradshaw – 24 rushes, 126 yards
- DAL – Felix Jones – 9 rushes, 35 yards

Top receivers

- NYG – Hakeem Nicks – 9 receptions, 108 yards, 2 touchdowns
- DAL – Jason Witten – 9 receptions, 95 yards, 1 touchdown

Top tacklers

- NYG – Hakeem Nicks – 9 receptions, 108 yards, 2 touchdowns
- DAL – Jason Witten – 9 receptions, 95 yards, 1 touchdown

Turnovers had been a nagging problem for the Giants all year, and it seemed their first division game of 2010 would be no exception; their first two drives ended in interceptions off receivers' hands, giving the struggling Cowboys an early 10–0 lead. The Giants finally got on the board late in the first quarter courtesy of a 7-yard Nicks reception. Following a Giants fumble in the second quarter, Dallas quarterback Tony Romo was hit hard by linebacker Michael Boley and left the game with a clavicle fracture (Notably, Romo was the fifth quarterback the Giants defense knocked out of a game this year, after Moore, Cutler, Collins, and Hill). After Cowboys kick returner Dez Bryant returned a Dodge punt 93 yards for a touchdown, the Giants scored two consecutive touchdowns; an 8-yard pass to Nicks and a 14-yard pass to Smith.

The Giants opened the second half with two more back-to-back touchdowns; a 25-yard pass to Manningham and a 30-yard Jacobs run. The Dallas offense, now led by veteran quarterback Jon Kitna, showed signs of life in the fourth quarter as Bryant caught two 15-yard touchdown passes. But two failed onside kicks allowed the Giants to log their third straight win over their divisional foes and the fourth win of their current streak. New York went into their bye week tied for the best record in the NFC.

=== Week 9: at Seattle Seahawks ===
Week 9: New York Giants at Seattle Seahawks – Game summary

Quarter	1	2	3	4	Total
Giants	21	14	6	0	41
Seahawks	0	0	0	7	7

at Qwest Field, Seattle, Washington

- Date: November 7
- Game time: 4:05 pm. EST
- Game weather: 55 °F (13 °C), Partly Sunny
- Game attendance: 67,287
- Referee: Pete Morelli
- TV announcers (Fox): Joe Buck, Troy Aikman and Pam Oliver
- Game Book Recap

Game information

First quarter

- NYG – Ahmad Bradshaw 2-yard run (Lawrence Tynes kick), Giants 7–0, Drive: 7 plays, 52 yards, 3:37.
- NYG – Hakeem Nicks 46-yard pass from Eli Manning (Lawrence Tynes kick), Giants 14–0, Drive: 4 plays, 63 yards, 2:00.
- NYG – Ahmad Bradshaw 4-yard run (Lawrence Tynes kick), Giants 21–0, Drive: 1 plays, 4 yards, 0:05.

Second quarter

- NYG – Steve Smith, Giants 28–0, Drive: 11 plays, 73 yards, 5:31.
- NYG – Kevin Boss 5-yard pass from Eli Manning (Lawrence Tynes kick), Giants 35–0, Drive: 10 plays, 86 yards, 4:11.

Third quarter

- NYG – Lawrence Tynes 25-yard field goal, Giants 38–0, Drive: 5 plays, 40 yards, 1:20.
- NYG – Lawrence Tynes 20-yard field goal, Giants 41–0, Drive: 15 plays, 78 yards, 8:29.

Fourth quarter

- SEA – Ben Obomanu 36-yard pass from Charlie Whitehurst (Olindo Mare kick), Giants 41–7, Drive: 3 plays, 70 yards, 1:26.

Top passers

- NYG – Eli Manning – 21/32, 290 yards, 3 touchdowns
- SEA – Charlie Whitehurst – 12/23, 113 yards, 1 touchdown, 2 interceptions

Top rushers

- NYG – Brandon Jacobs – 11 rushes, 78 yards
- SEA – Marshawn Lynch – 11 rushes, 48 yards

Top receivers

- NYG – Hakeem Nicks – 6 receptions, 128 yards, 1 touchdown
- SEA – Ben Obomanu – 1 reception, 36 yards, 1 touchdown

Top tacklers

- NYG – Corey Webster – 4 tackles, 1 assist, 1 interception
- SEA – David Hawthorne – 9 tackles, 3 assists

Seattle quarterback Charlie Whitehurst's first career start was one to forget; the Giants defense held Matt Hasselbeck's backup to just 113 passing yards in New York's biggest win of the year to this point. The Giants scored 38 unanswered points in the first three-quarters, including touchdowns by four players; two Bradshaw runs, a 46-yard pass to Nicks, and short touchdown passes to Smith and Boss. Whitehurst finally recorded his first NFL touchdown pass in the fourth quarter, connecting on a 36-yard pass to receiver Ben Obomanu. But the Giants put together a 13-minute drive, in which all snaps were taken by Sage Rosenfels, to take nearly all the remaining time off the clock. The Giants had earned their first win at Seattle since 1981, and extended their winning streak to five games.

=== Week 10: vs. Dallas Cowboys ===
Week 10: Dallas Cowboys at New York Giants – Game summary

Quarter	1	2	3	4	Total
Cowboys	6	13	14	0	33
Giants	3	3	14	0	20

at New Meadowlands Stadium, East Rutherford, New Jersey

- Date: November 14
- Game time: 4:15 pm EST (3:15 pm CST)
- Game weather: 60 °F (16 °C), Clear
- Game attendance: 80,851
- Referee: Bill Leavy
- TV announcers (FOX): Joe Buck, Troy Aikman, and Pam Oliver
- Recap

Game information

First quarter

- NYG – Lawrence Tynes 43-yard field goal, Giants 3–0, 'Drive: 10 plays, 55 yards, 5:11.
- DAL – Dez Bryant 13-yard pass from Jon Kitna (kick blocked), Cowboys 6–3, 'Drive: 3 plays, 71 yards, 1:36.

Second quarter

- DAL – David Buehler 22-yard field goal, Cowboys 9–3, 'Drive: 3 plays, 71 yards, 1:36.
- DAL – Bryan McCann 101-yard interception return (David Buehler kick), Cowboys 16–3.
- DAL – David Buehler 23-yard field goal, Cowboys 19–3, 'Drive: 5 plays, 39 yards, 1:55.
- NYG – Lawrence Tynes 25-yard field goal, Cowboys 19–6, 'Drive: 7 plays, 67 yards, 1:40.

Third quarter

- DAL – Felix Jones 71-yard pass from Jon Kitna (David Buehler kick), Cowboys 26–6, 'Drive: 3 plays, 71 yards, 1:04.
- NYG – Mario Manningham 5-yard pass from Eli Manning (Lawrence Tynes kick), Cowboys 26–12, 'Drive: 8 plays, 58 yards, 5:00.
- DAL – Miles Austin 24-yard pass from Jon Kitna (David Buehler kick), Cowboys 33–12, 'Drive: 6 plays, 85 yards, 2:29.
- NYG – Kevin Boss 35-yard pass from Eli Manning (Lawrence Tynes kick), Cowboys 33–19, 'Drive: 2 plays, 73 yards, 1:08.

Fourth quarter

- No scoring plays

Top passers

- DAL – Jon Kitna – 13/22, 327 yards, 3 touchdowns, 1 interception
- NYG – Eli Manning – 33/48, 373 yards, 2 touchdowns, 2 interceptions

Top rushers

- DAL – Felix Jones – 14 rushes, 51 yards
- NYG – Ahmad Bradshaw – 20 rushes, 73 yards

Top receivers

- DAL – Dez Bryant – 3 receptions, 104 yards, 1 touchdowns
- NYG – Mario Manningham – 10 receptions, 91 yards, 1 touchdown

Top tacklers

- DAL – Bradie James – 7 tackles, 6 assists
- NYG – Terrell Thomas – 5 tackles, 3 assists

A power outage that disrupted play in the third quarter served as a fitting metaphor for the Giants' general lack of power on the field this night. Smith was sidelined by a torn pectoral muscle suffered during practice, and backup receiver Ramses Barden saw his season come to an end during this game by way of a torn Achilles tendon. Former Giant Jason Garrett was making his head coaching debut for a Cowboys team revitalized by the firing of head coach Wade Phillips one week earlier.

The Dallas defense held the Giants to just 6 points in the first half, aided by cornerback Bryan McCann's 101-yard "pick 6" from his own end zone. In a dimly lit third quarter, after a bank of lights went dark, Felix Jones extended the Cowboys' lead to 20 points on a 71-yard touchdown reception. Only after a total blackout caused an eight-minute play stoppage did Manning finally put the Giants' first touchdown on the board, in the form of a 5-yard pass to Manningham. The teams continued to trade touchdowns; a 24-yard pass from Kitna to Austin was followed by a 35-yard reception by Boss. But the Giants' turnover problem resurfaced in the fourth quarter, where a fumble and an interception ended up costing them any chance at a comeback.

=== Week 11: at Philadelphia Eagles ===
Week 11: New York Giants at Philadelphia Eagles – Game summary

Quarter	1	2	3	4	Total
Giants	0	3	7	7	17
Eagles	7	6	3	11	27

at Lincoln Financial Field, Philadelphia, Pennsylvania

- Date: November 21
- Game time: 8:20 pm. EST
- Game weather: 45 °F (7 °C), Partly Cloudy
- Game attendance: 69,144
- Referee: Ron Winter
- TV announcers (NBC): Al Michaels, Cris Collinsworth and Andrea Kremer
- Game Book Recap

Game information

First quarter

- PHI – Michael Vick 4-yard run (David Akers kick), Eagles 7–0, Drive: 13 plays, 68 yards, 7:09.

Second quarter

- NYG – Lawrence Tynes 24-yard field goal, Eagles 7–3, Drive: 14 plays, 74 yards, 8:06.
- PHI – David Akers 38-yard field goal, Eagles 10–3, Drive: 4 plays, 3 yards, 1:18.
- PHI – David Akers 24-yard field goal, Eagles 13–3, Drive: 4 plays, 7 yards, 1:33.

Third quarter

- PHI – David Akers 28-yard field goal, Eagles 16–3, Drive: 14 plays, 82 yards, 8:22.
- NYG – Travis Beckum 2-yard pass from Eli Manning (Lawrence Tynes kick), Eagles 16–10, Drive: 9 plays, 68 yards, 6:11.

Fourth quarter

- NYG – Derek Hagan 5-yard pass from Eli Manning (Lawrence Tynes kick), Giants 17–16, Drive: 2 plays, 27 yards, 0:40.
- PHI – LeSean McCoy 50-yard run (Michael Vick – Jason Avant pass), Eagles 24–17, Drive: 7 plays, 90 yards, 3:27.
- PHI – David Akers 30-yard field goal, Eagles 27–17, Drive: 6 plays, 48 yards, 2:29.

Top passers

- NYG – Eli Manning – 20/33, 147 yards, 2 touchdowns, 3 interceptions
- PHI – Michael Vick – 24/38, 258 yards

Top rushers

- NYG – Ahmad Bradshaw – 12 rushes, 29 yards
- PHI – LeSean McCoy – 14 rushes, 111 yards, 1 touchdown

Top receivers

- NYG – Hakeem Nicks – 6 receptions, 65 yards
- PHI – Jeremy Maclin – 9 receptions, 120 yards

Top tacklers

- NYG – Terrell Thomas – 9 tackles, 1 assist
- PHI – Dimitri Patterson – 6 tackles, 1 assist

The Eagles were coming off their highest-scoring game of the year, having put up 59 points against the Redskins on Monday night. By contrast, this Sunday night game was a defensive struggle in which the Giants held the normally speedy Michael Vick to 34 rushing yards and no passing touchdowns.

After Vick scored the first points of the game on a 4-yard run, the focus moved to the defenses and the kicking games. The Giants defense saved their offense from two-second-quarter turnovers by forcing several David Akers field goal attempts, blocking one to end the first half. After losing Ellis Hobbs to a neck injury sustained on the second-half kickoff, Philadelphia put together a drive that consumed more than eight minutes of clock, but were still held to another Akers field goal. The Giants' offense finally came to life on the next drive, as Manning connected with Beckum for a short touchdown. In the fourth quarter, Umenyiora forced the Eagles' first turnover of the year, stripping the ball away from Vick to set up backup receiver Derek Hagan's first touchdown catch of the year (Hagan had been cut by the Giants prior to the season, but was re-signed the week before, after the extent of Barden's injury became apparent). Later, on a fourth down play, Eagles rusher LeSean McCoy ran for a 50-yard touchdown, which wide receiver Jason Avant followed with a two-point conversion catch. Unfortunately, as was the case last week in East Rutherford, the Giants thwarted their own comeback attempt with turnovers, committing three in the last five minutes of the game (including an interception which Philadelphia's Asante Samuel fumbled right back to the Giants). The crusher was a fourth-down play on which Manning successfully rushed for the first down but fumbled while sliding headfirst; by rule, had he slid feet-first, the play would have been over and no fumble could have occurred. The Eagles turned the gift fumble into a game-clinching field goal.

=== Week 12: vs. Jacksonville Jaguars ===
Week 12: Jacksonville Jaguars at New York Giants – Game summary

Quarter	1	2	3	4	Total
Jaguars	7	10	0	3	20
Giants	3	3	3	15	24

at New Meadowlands Stadium, East Rutherford, New Jersey

- Date: November 28
- Game time: 1:00 pm. EST
- Game weather: 43 °F (6 °C), Sunny
- Game attendance: 78,533
- Referee: Terry McAulay
- TV announcers (CBS): Greg Gumbel and Dan Dierdorf
- Recap

Game information

First quarter

- NYG – Lawrence Tynes 22-yard field goal, Guants 3–0, Drive: 11 plays, 75 yards, 5:54.
- JAC – Rashad Jennings 5-yard run (Josh Scobee kick), Jaguars 7–3, Drive: 9 plays, 75 yards, 4:22.

Second quarter

- JAC – Josh Scobee 22-yard field goal, Jaguars 10–3, Drive: 15 plays, 85 yards, 8:57.
- NYG – Lawrence Tynes 29-yard field goal, Jaguars 10–6, Drive: 7 plays, 64 yards, 3:37.
- JAC – David Garrard 5-yard run (Josh Scobee kick), Jaguars 17–6, Drive: 13 plays, 71 yards, 5:15.

Third quarter

- NYG – Lawrence Tynes 28-yard field goal, Jaguars 17–9, Drive: 10 plays, 24 yards, 4:27.

Fourth quarter

- NYG – Mario Manningham 26-yard pass from Eli Manning (Ahmad Bradshaw run), Tied 17–17, Drive: 5 plays, 88 yards, 1:57.
- JAC – Josh Scobee 42-yard field goal, Jaguars 20–17, Drive: 10 plays, 42 yards, 5:16.
- NYG – Kevin Boss 32-yard pass from Eli Manning (Lawrence Tynes kick), Giants 24–20, Drive: 6 plays, 69 yards, 2:40.

Top passers

- JAC – David Garrard – 20/35, 162 yards, 1 interception
- NYG – Eli Manning – 14/24, 226 yards, 2 touchdowns

Top rushers

- JAC – Maurice Jones-Drew – 21 rushes, 113 yards
- NYG – Brandon Jacobs – 14 rushes, 87 yards

Top receivers

- JAC – Mike Sims-Walker – 4 receptions, 48 yards
- NYG – Kevin Boss – 3 receptions, 74 yards, 1 touchdown

Top tacklers

- JAC – Courtney Greene – 7 tackles, 4 assists
- NYG – Deon Grant – 8 tackles

Coach Coughlin's former team dominated the Giants in 2006, when he faced them for the first time. For this rematch, the Giants were without their two star receivers; Smith's pectoral injury caused him to miss his third game, while Nicks underwent treatment for compartment syndrome caused by a leg injury in Philadelphia. The Giants had signed Michael Clayton during the week to bolster their receiving situation, but he saw little action in this game.

For the first three-quarters, the Jaguars' defense held the Giants to three Tynes field goals; this was now the third straight game in which the Giants were held to 6 points or fewer in the first half. Rashad Jennings and David Garrard provided Jacksonville with two rushing touchdowns to take a 17–6 lead at halftime. The offense finally came to life at the end of the third quarter, when big plays by Jacobs and Boss set up a 26-yard Manningham touchdown reception followed by a two-point Bradshaw run. Later in the fourth quarter, Manning led the Giants down the field on a 6-play, 61-yard drive, culminating in a go-ahead 32-yard touchdown catch by Boss. The Jaguars threatened a comeback, and even made it into New York territory after the two-minute warning. But Justin Tuck, Antrel Rolle, Jason Pierre-Paul, and Terrell Thomas combined to sack Garrard on three consecutive plays, the last of which resulted in a fumble that was recovered by Rolle. The Giants had won their first turnover-free game of 2010, and tied the Eagles for the division lead.

=== Week 13: vs. Washington Redskins ===
Week 13: Washington Redskins at New York Giants – Game summary

Quarter	1	2	3	4	Total
Redskins	0	0	7	0	7
Giants	14	7	7	3	31

at New Meadowlands Stadium, East Rutherford, New Jersey

- Date: December 5
- Game time: 1:00 pm. EST
- Game weather: 33 °F (1 °C), Mostly Cloudy
- Game attendance: 78,861
- Referee: Walt Coleman
- TV announcers (Fox): Kenny Albert, Daryl Johnston and Tony Siragusa
- Game Book Recap

Game information

First quarter

- NYG – Brandon Jacobs 8-yard run (Lawrence Tynes kick), Giants 7–0, Drive: 7 plays, 59 yards, 3:34.
- NYG – Ahmad Bradshaw 4-yard run (Lawrence Tynes kick), Giants 14–0, Drive: 7 plays, 59 yards, 4:01.

Second quarter

- NYG – Ahmad Bradshaw 10-yard run (Lawrence Tynes kick), Giants 21–0, Drive: 5 plays, 39 yards, 2:24.

Third quarter

- NYG – Brandon Jacobs 28-yard run (Lawrence Tynes kick), Giants 28–0, Drive: 8 plays, 42 yards, 4:26.
- WAS – Anthony Armstrong 33-yard pass from Donovan McNabb (Graham Gano kick), Giants 28–7, Drive: 4 plays, 72 yards, 2:01.

Fourth quarter

- NYG – Lawrence Tynes 28-yard field goal, Giants 31–7, Drive: 4 plays, 3 yards, 1:35.

Top passers

- WAS – Donovan McNabb – 26/44, 296 yards, 1 touchdown, 2 interceptions
- NYG – Eli Manning – 15/25, 161 yards, 1 interception

Top rushers

- WAS – James Davis – 9 rushes, 40 yards
- NYG – Brandon Jacobs – 8 rushes, 103 yards, 2 touchdowns

Top receivers

- WAS – Anthony Armstrong – 6 receptions, 97 yards, 1 touchdown
- NYG – Derek Hagan – 7 receptions, 65 yards

Top tacklers

- WAS – Reed Doughty – 7 tackles, 3 assists
- NYG – Barry Cofield – 7 tackles

The Giants needed this division win to keep pace with the Eagles, and they had no trouble getting it. The rushing duo of Bradshaw and Jacobs combined for 200 yards and all four touchdowns (two each) as high winds discouraged Manning's passing game. For the first time this year, the Giants scored on each of their first two drives, taking a 14-point lead before the Redskins even managed a first down. From that point, the New York defense dominated, forcing six fumbles, recovering four, and intercepting two Donovan McNabb passes. Former Redskin Devin Thomas made an impact in his Giants debut by blocking a Hunter Smith punt to set up Tynes' field goal and wrap up a crucial win. Notably, the Giants now were 3–1 all-time against potential Hall of Fame coach Mike Shanahan.

=== Week 14: at Minnesota Vikings ===
Week 14: New York Giants at Minnesota Vikings – Game summary

Quarter	1	2	3	4	Total
Giants	0	14	7	0	21
Vikings	3	0	0	0	3

at Ford Field, Detroit, Michigan (moved from the Metrodome due to a roof collapse)

- Date: December 13 (rescheduled from December 12)
- Game time: 7:20 pm. EST
- Game weather: None (dome stadium)
- Game attendance: 45,910
- Referee: Jeff Triplette
- TV announcers (Fox): Joe Buck, Troy Aikman and Pam Oliver
- Game Book Recap

Game information

First quarter

- MIN – Ryan Longwell 21-yard field goal, Vikings 3–0, Drive: 10 plays, 31 yards, 4:35.

Second quarter

- NYG – Brandon Jacobs 1-yard run (Lawrence Tynes kick), Giants 7–3, Drive: 6 plays, 89 yards, 3:45.
- NYG – Kevin Boss 6-yard pass from Eli Manning (Lawrence Tynes kick), Giants 14–3, Drive: 9 plays, 71 yards, 1:40.

Third quarter

- NYG – Ahmad Bradshaw 48-yard run (Lawrence Tynes kick), Giants 21–3, Drive: 3 plays, 59 yards, 1:00.

Fourth quarter

- No scoring plays

Top passers

- NYG – Eli Manning – 22/37, 187 yards, 1 touchdown, 2 interceptions
- MIN – Tarvaris Jackson – 15/30, 118 yards, 1 interception

Top rushers

- NYG – Brandon Jacobs – 14 rushes, 116 yards, 1 touchdown
- MIN – Adrian Peterson – 14 rushes, 26 yards

Top receivers

- NYG – Hakeem Nicks – 7 receptions, 96 yards
- MIN – Sidney Rice – 5 receptions, 60 yards

Top tacklers

- NYG – Terrell Thomas – 5 tackles, 2 assists
- MIN – Asher Allen – 8 tackles, 3 assists, 1 interception

Originally scheduled for 1 pm. EST on Sunday, December 12, this game was moved to Monday night after severe blizzard conditions in the Minneapolis-St. Paul area that forced the Giants to spend the night in Kansas City after their flight was diverted, while the operators of the Hubert H. Humphrey Metrodome asked for more time to clear all the snow from the stadium's bubbled roof. The roof later collapsed, forcing the NFL to use Ford Field in Detroit as an alternate site. The game aired on WNYW in New York City, WXXA-TV in Albany, and KMSP-TV in Minneapolis-St. Paul, along with the Fox affiliates in Duluth, Mankato and Rochester. But even the disaster in Minneapolis was overshadowed by another major headline: Vikings quarterback Brett Favre was listed as inactive for this game, ending his historic streak of 297 consecutive starts. Tarvaris Jackson, who was 2–0 in his career against the Giants, started in Favre's place.

Once again, the Giants drew strength from their running game, as Jacobs and Bradshaw combined for 219 yards rushing and two touchdowns. In the second quarter, Jacobs created his longest play of the season, a 73-yard run that set up his own short touchdown. After a by-now-typical shaky start from Manning that involved two interceptions, Manning closed out the first half with a 6-yard touchdown pass to Boss (Incidentally, news about another streak was lost in the talk about Favre: Manning was making his 100th consecutive start tonight). Bradshaw's touchdown came in the third quarter, on a 48-yard run that was also his longest of the season. The New York defense had an especially memorable night, holding the normally dominant Adrian Peterson to his lowest rushing output of the year, a paltry 26 yards. Umeniyora, Barry Cofield, Rocky Bernard, Dave Tollefson, and Jonathan Goff combined for four sacks, and Keith Bulluck contributed an interception.

Unfortunately, the injury bug hit the Giants again in several key places. Special-teamer Clint Sintim's season ended with a torn ACL, and Bradshaw and Manningham both left the game early with injuries to the forearm and hip flexor, respectively. Diehl, Nicks, and Smith returned from their injuries, but Smith suffered a new injury to his hamstring. Whether these players will be available for the crucial division game in Week 15 has yet to be determined.

With this win, the Giants rose to 9–4 and ensured that they would improve on the previous season's record of 8–8.

=== Week 15: vs. Philadelphia Eagles ===
Week 15: Philadelphia Eagles at New York Giants – Game summary

Quarter	1	2	3	4	Total
Eagles	0	3	7	28	38
Giants	7	17	0	7	31

at New Meadowlands Stadium, East Rutherford, New Jersey

- Date: December 19
- Game time: 1:00 pm. EST
- Game weather: 33 °F (1 °C), Partly Cloudy
- Game attendance: 81,223
- Referee: John Parry
- TV announcers (Fox): Joe Buck, Troy Aikman and Pam Oliver
- Game Book, NFL Network Gameday highlights Recap

Game information

First quarter

- NYG – Mario Manningham 35-yard pass from Eli Manning (Lawrence Tynes kick), Giants 7–0, Drive: 9 plays, 71 yards, 4:17.

Second quarter

- PHI – David Akers 34-yard field goal, Giants 7–3, Drive: 5 plays, 29 yards, 2:12.
- NYG – Mario Manningham 33-yard pass from Eli Manning (Lawrence Tynes kick), Giants 14–3, Drive: 8 plays, 73 yards, 4:45.
- NYG – Lawrence Tynes 25-yard field goal, Giants 17–3, Drive: 12 plays, 55 yards, 3:23.
- NYG – Hakeem Nicks 8-yard pass from Eli Manning (Lawrence Tynes kick), Giants 24–3, Drive: 1 plays, 8 yards, 0:04.

Third quarter

- PHI – Jeremy Maclin 8-yard pass from Michael Vick (David Akers kick), Giants 24–10, Drive: 3 plays, 25 yards, 1:04.

Fourth quarter

- NYG – Kevin Boss 8-yard pass from Eli Manning (Lawrence Tynes kick), Giants 31–10, Drive: 7 plays, 47 yards, 4:17.
- PHI – Brent Celek 65-yard pass from Michael Vick (David Akers kick), Giants 31–17, Drive: 2 plays, 75 yards, 0:49.
- PHI – Michael Vick 4-yard run (David Akers kick), Giants 31–24, Drive: 5 plays, 57 yards, 2:00.
- PHI – Jeremy Maclin 13-yard pass from Michael Vick (David Akers kick), Tied 31–31, Drive: 8 plays, 88 yards, 1:45.
- PHI – DeSean Jackson 65-yard punt return (David Akers kick), Eagles 38–31.

Top passers

- PHI – Michael Vick – 21/35, 242 yards, 3 touchdowns, 1 interception
- NYG – Eli Manning – 23/39, 289 yards, 4 touchdowns, 1 interception

Top rushers

- PHI – Michael Vick – 10 rushes, 130 yards, 1 touchdown
- NYG – Ahmad Bradshaw – 19 rushes, 66 yards

Top receivers

- PHI – Brent Celek – 2 receptions, 72 yards, 1 touchdown
- NYG – Mario Manningham – 8 receptions, 113 yards, 2 touchdowns

Top tacklers

- PHI – Jamar Chaney – 12 tackles, 4 assists, 1 forced fumble
- NYG – Justin Tuck – 6 tackles, 1 assist, 1.5 sack

Coming off their win over the Vikings the Giants played on home ground for an NFC East rivalry rematch against the Eagles. The Giants suffered their worst loss of the season, blowing a 31-10 fourth-quarter lead and allowing a punt return for a touchdown as time expired in regulation.

In the first quarter the Giants took the early lead as quarterback Eli Manning completed a 35-yard touchdown pass to wide receiver Mario Manningham. The Eagles responded in the second quarter with kicker David Akers getting a 34-yard field goal, but the Giants extended their lead after Manning found Manningham on a 33-yard touchdown pass, followed by kicker Lawrence Tynes nailing a 25-yard field goal, then with Manning getting an 8-yard touchdown pass to wide receiver Hakeem Nicks. The Eagles cut the lead with quarterback Michael Vick making an 8-yard touchdown pass to wide receiver Jeremy Maclin, but the Giants scored with Manning finding tight end Kevin Boss on an 8-yard touchdown pass. However, they failed to maintain this lead with Vick making a 65-yard touchdown pass to tight end Brent Celek, followed by his 4-yard scramble for a touchdown and then his 13-yard touchdown pass to Maclin to tie the game at 31. After the Giants went three and out Matt Dodge's punt was returned 65 yards for a touchdown by DeSean Jackson, giving the Giants a loss, and thus bringing their record down to 9–5.

=== Week 16: at Green Bay Packers ===
Week 16: New York Giants at Green Bay Packers – Game summary

Quarter	1	2	3	4	Total
Giants	0	14	3	0	17
Packers	14	7	10	14	45

at Lambeau Field, Green Bay, Wisconsin

- Date: December 26
- Game time: 4:15 pm. EST
- Game weather: 25 °F (−4 °C), Partly Cloudy
- Game attendance: 70,649
- Referee: Walt Anderson
- TV announcers (Fox): Joe Buck, Troy Aikman and Pam Oliver
- Recap

Game information

First quarter

- GB – Jordy Nelson 80-yard pass from Aaron Rodgers (Mason Crosby kick), Packers 7–0, Drive: 1 plays, 80 yards, 0:11.
- GB – James Jones 3-yard pass from Aaron Rodgers (Mason Crosby kick), Packers 14–0, Drive: 10 plays, 44 yards, 4:59.

Second quarter

- NYG – Hakeem Nicks 36-yard pass from Eli Manning (Lawrence Tynes kick), Packers 14–7, Drive: 4 plays, 70 yards, 2:24.
- NYG – Mario Manningham 85-yard pass from Eli Manning (Lawrence Tynes kick), Tied 14–14, Drive: 1 plays, 85 yards, 0:12.
- GB – John Kuhn 8-yard run (Mason Crosby kick), Packers 21–14, Drive: 6 plays, 79 yards, 3:19.

Third quarter

- GB – Mason Crosby 31-yard field goal, Packers 24–14, Drive: 8 plays, 38 yards, 3:27.
- NYG – Lawrence Tynes 38-yard field goal, Packers 24–17, Drive: 6 plays, 46 yards, 2:46.
- GB – Donald Lee 1-yard pass from Aaron Rodgers (Mason Crosby kick), Packers 31–17, Drive: 4 plays, 70 yards, 2:26.

Fourth quarter

- GB – John Kuhn 5-yard pass from Aaron Rodgers (Mason Crosby kick), Packers 38–17, Drive: 5 plays, 46 yards, 2:49.
- GB – John Kuhn 1-yard run (Mason Crosby kick), Packers 45–17, Drive: 6 plays, 49 yards, 1:55.

Top passers

- NYG – Eli Manning – 17/33, 301 yards, 2 touchdowns, 4 interceptions
- GB – Aaron Rodgers – 25/37, 404 yards, 4 touchdowns

Top rushers

- NYG – Brandon Jacobs – 8 rushes, 47 yards
- GB – Brandon Jackson – 18 rushes, 39 yards

Top receivers

- NYG – Mario Manningham – 4 receptions, 132 yards, 1 touchdown
- GB – Greg Jennings – 7 receptions, 142 yards

Top tacklers

- NYG – Kenny Phillips – 6 tackles, 4 assists
- GB – Desmond Bishop – 7 tackles, 2 assists

Hoping to rebound from their loss to the Eagles the Giants flew to Lambeau Field for an NFC duel with the Packers. In the first quarter the Giants trailed early with quarterback Aaron Rodgers completing an 80 and a 3-yard touchdown pass to wide receiver Jordy Nelson and to wide receiver James Jones respectively. The Giants replied to tie the game with quarterback Eli Manning throwing a 36 and an 85-yard touchdown pass to wide receiver Hakeem Nicks and Mario Manningham. They had further problems with fullback John Kuhn getting an 8-yard touchdown run, followed by kicker Mason Crosby getting a 31-yard field goal. The Giants cut the lead with kicker Lawrence Tynes nailing a 38-yard field goal, but fell further behind with Rodgers completing a 1 and a 5-yard touchdown run to tight end Donald Lee and to Kuhn respectively. This was followed by Kuhn getting a 1-yard touchdown run.

With the loss, the Giants fell to 9–6.

=== Week 17: at Washington Redskins ===
Week 17: New York Giants at Washington Redskins – Game summary

Quarter	1	2	3	4	Total
Giants	3	7	7	0	17
Redskins	0	7	0	7	14

at FedExField, Landover, Maryland

- Date: January 2
- Game time: 4:15 pm. EST
- Game weather: 37 °F (3 °C), Rain
- Game attendance: 76,189
- Referee: Scott Green
- TV announcers (Fox): Sam Rosen and Tim Ryan
- Recap

Game information

First quarter

- NYG – Lawrence Tynes 20-yard field goal, Giants 3–0, Drive: 11 plays, 78 yards, 5:58.

Second quarter

- NYG – Brandon Jacobs 2-yard run (Lawrence Tynes kick), Giants 10–0, Drive: 9 plays, 69 yards, 4:54.
- WAS – Fred Davis 1-yard pass from Rex Grossman (Graham Gano kick), Giants 10–7, Drive: 7 plays, 80 yards, 2:44.

Third quarter

- NYG – Mario Manningham 92-yard pass from Eli Manning (Lawrence Tynes kick), Giants 17–7, Drive: 2 plays, 95 yards, 0:57.

Fourth quarter

- WAS – Anthony Armstrong 64-yard pass from Rex Grossman (Graham Gano kick), Giants 17–14, Drive: 1 plays, 64 yards, 0:10.

Top passers

- NYG – Eli Manning – 17/29, 243 yards, 1 touchdown, 1 interception
- WAS – Rex Grossman – 26/44, 336 yards, 2 touchdowns, 1 interception

Top rushers

- NYG – Brandon Jacobs – 13 rushes, 49 yards, 1 touchdown
- WAS – Ryan Torain – 18 rushes, 61 yards

Top receivers

- NYG – Mario Manningham – 4 receptions, 101 yards, 1 touchdown
- WAS – Anthony Armstrong – 2 receptions, 84 yards, 1 touchdown

Top tacklers

- NYG – Terrell Thomas – 7 tackles, 3 assists
- WAS – Phillip Buchanon – 4 tackles, 1 assist, 1 interception; DeAngelo Hall – 4 tackles, 2 assists; London Fletcher – 4 tackles, 5 assists

Hoping to clinch a playoff spot the Giants bused to FedExField for a division rivalry rematch against the Redskins. The Giants took the lead as kicker Lawrence Tynes hit a 20-yard field goal. This was followed by Brandon Jacobs getting a 2-yard touchdown run. The lead was narrowed when quarterback Rex Grossman threw a 1-yard touchdown pass to tight end Fred Davis, but the Giants extended their lead with quarterback Eli Manning connecting to Mario Manningham on a 92-yard touchdown pass. The lead was narrowed in the fourth quarter as Grossman completed a 64-yard touchdown pass to wide receiver Anthony Armstrong, but the Giants defense held them on for the win.

Despite the win, the Giants failed to make the playoffs after Green Bay defeated Chicago. The Giants finished their regular season with a 10–6 record.

John Mara announced Tom Coughlin would return as head coach next season.
