= Sean Ryan (American football coach) =

American football player and coach (born 1972)

Syracuse Orange
- Title: Quarterbacks coach

Personal information
- Born: May 1, 1972 (age 54); Hudson Falls, New York, U.S.

Career information
- Positions: Safety, linebacker
- High school: Hudson Falls (NY)
- College: Hamilton College

Career history
- Albany (1998–1999) Graduate assistant; Colgate (2000) Running backs coach; Boston College (2001–2002) Graduate assistant; Columbia (2003) Running backs coach & special teams coordinator; Columbia (2004) Quarterbacks coach; Harvard (2006) Running backs coach & recruiting coordinator; New York Giants (2007–2009) Offensive quality control coach; New York Giants (2010–2011) Wide receivers coach; New York Giants (2012–2013) Quarterbacks coach; New York Giants (2014–2015) Wide receivers coach; Houston Texans (2016) Wide receivers coach; Houston Texans (2017–2018) Quarterbacks coach; Detroit Lions (2019–2020) Quarterbacks coach; Carolina Panthers (2021–2022) Quarterbacks coach; South Carolina (2023) Offensive analyst; Miami Dolphins (2024) Defensive assistant; Syracuse (2026–present) Quarterbacks coach & passing game coordinator

Awards and highlights
- 2× Super Bowl champion (XLII, XLVI)

Sean Ryan (born May 1, 1972) is an American football coach currently serving as the quarterbacks coach for the Syracuse Orange. He has previously served as an assistant coach for the Detroit Lions, Houston Texans, New York Giants, and the Carolina Panthers all of the National Football League (NFL), and is often cited for his development of star players including Victor Cruz, Odell Beckham Jr., Matthew Stafford, Eli Manning, and Deshaun Watson.

== Early life and education ==
A native of Hudson Falls, New York, Ryan was a standout football, basketball, and baseball player at Hudson Falls High School.

Ryan played safety and outside linebacker at Hamilton College, where he graduated in 1994 with a degree in American studies. He also earned a master's degree in higher education administration from University at Albany.

== College coaching career ==
Ryan began his coaching career in 1997 as a quarterbacks coach at Siena College in Loudonville, NY. He then moved on to become a Graduate Assistant at the University of Albany from 1998 to 1999.

Ryan was the running backs coach at Colgate University in 2000.

Ryan spent two years as a graduate assistant at Boston College, where he worked primarily with the wide receivers. The Eagles won bowl games in each of those seasons, beating Georgia in the 2001 Music City Bowl and Toledo in the 2002 Motor City Bowl.

Ryan was as an assistant coach at Columbia University for three seasons. In 2003 and 2004, Ryan was the running backs coach and special teams coordinator. The following season, Ryan coached was promoted to quarterbacks coach.

In 2006, Ryan was the recruiting coordinator, running backs coach and head coach of the junior varsity squad at Harvard University.

== NFL coaching career ==
=== New York Giants ===
==== Offensive assistant and Super Bowl (2007–2010) ====
After his time at Harvard, Ryan joined Tom Coughlin's staff as an offensive quality control coach. In Ryan's first year with the Giants, the team secured the third Super Bowl victory in team history when the Giant's upset the unbeaten 2007 New England Patriots 17–14 in Super Bowl XLII, earning his first Super Bowl Ring.

==== Wide receivers coach and second Super Bowl (2010–2011) ====
In 2010, Ryan was promoted to wide receivers coach, a position he held for two seasons.

During his first stint as wide receiver's coach, Ryan is credited with the development of star players such as Hakeem Nicks, Mario Manningham and undrafted free agent Victor Cruz.

In 2011, the unit helped the Giants set a franchise record with 4,734 net passing yards en route to the team's second Super Bowl in four years when the Giants defeated the Patriots in Super Bowl XLVI.

==== Quarterbacks coach (2012–2014) ====
In 2012, he was promoted to Giants' quarterback coach and was put in charge of 2002 first overall pick David Carr and two-time Super Bowl MVP and 2004 first overall pick, Eli Manning.

In Ryan's first year as quarterbacks coach, Giant's quarterback Eli Manning finished the season with 26 touchdown passes, 15 interceptions, and 3,948 passing yards and made the 2012 Pro Bowl.

==== Second stint as wide receivers coach (2014–2015) ====
In 2014, Ryan was reassigned to coach the wide receivers when Ben McAdoo was named the offensive coordinator after Kevin Gilbride's retirement.

The Giants drafted Odell Beckham Jr twelfth overall in the 2014 out of LSU. Ryan was instrumental in the rapid development of Beckham Jr., who shattered all franchise rookie records with 91 passes for 1,305 yards and 12 touchdowns (in just 12 games). Under Ryan's tutelage, Beckham was selected to the 2015 Pro Bowl, the Associated Press' Offensive Rookie of the Year and was also awarded the 2014 Pro Football Writers NFL Offensive Rookie of the Year Award.

=== Houston Texans (2016–2018) ===
==== Wide receivers coach (2016) ====
On January 15, 2016, Ryan was hired by the Houston Texans as their wide receivers coach under head coach Bill O'Brien.

==== Quarterbacks coach (2017–2018) ====
On January 18, 2017, Ryan was promoted by the Texans to be their quarterbacks coach.

=== Detroit Lions (2019–2020) ===
On January 29, 2019, Ryan was hired by the Detroit Lions to be their quarterbacks coach under head coach Matt Patricia. He was the interim offensive play caller for the team's week 16 game in 2020 against the Tampa Bay Buccaneers due to interim head coach Darrell Bevell missing the game under COVID-19 protocols.

=== Carolina Panthers (2021–2022) ===
On January 20, 2021, Ryan was hired by the Carolina Panthers to be their quarterbacks coach under head coach Matt Rhule, replacing Jake Peetz, who left to become the offensive coordinator at Louisiana State University (LSU).
