= Jonathan Goff =

American football player (born 1985)

No. 54
- Position: Linebacker

Personal information
- Born: December 12, 1985 (age 40); Atlanta, Georgia, U.S.
- Listed height: 6 ft 2 in (1.88 m)
- Listed weight: 238 lb (108 kg)

Career information
- High school: St. John's Prep (Danvers, Massachusetts)
- College: Vanderbilt
- NFL draft: 2008: 5th round, 165th overall pick

Career history
- New York Giants (2008–2011); Washington Redskins (2012)*
- * Offseason or practice squad member only

Awards and highlights
- Super Bowl champion (XLVI); 2× Second-team All-SEC (2006, 2007)

Career NFL statistics
- Total tackles: 107
- Sacks: 2
- Forced fumbles: 1
- Fumble recoveries: 1
- Interceptions: 1
- Stats at Pro Football Reference

Jonathan Goff (born December 12, 1985) is an American former professional football player who was a linebacker in the National Football League (NFL). He played college football for the Vanderbilt Commodores and was selected by the New York Giants in the fifth round of the 2008 NFL draft. He was a member of the Super Bowl XLVI Giants, defeating the New England Patriots, though he remained on injured reserve for the entire season.

== Early life ==
Jonathan Goff was born to Gwendolyn Tyre and Tobie Goff in Atlanta, Georgia. He was raised by his mother in Stoneham, Massachusetts, with his older brother, Jason. Goff grew up swimming and playing soccer, tennis and basketball. Goff qualified for the Johns Hopkins Gifted and Talented student program based on SAT scores received when he was twelve years old. He began playing football in the 8th grade in the Wakefield (Massachusetts) Pop Warner League. Goff played high school football at St. John's Preparatory School in Danvers, Massachusetts, an academic and all-male private high school. During his career he started at many positions including safety, wide receiver, quarterback, running back, and linebacker. In football, he was a two-year captain and an All-conference selection in 2001 and 2002. He also played basketball and was captain of the track team, where he succeeded immensely, breaking a longstanding record in the discus. His senior year, he broke St. John's long standing discus record and later that season, he broke his own discus record.

== College career ==
Goff played college football at Vanderbilt University. He played in 46 games with 36 starts, recording 307 tackles, 15.5 tackles for losses, 6.5 sacks, three interceptions, three forced fumbles, and one blocked kick. As a senior in 2007, he was second-team All-Southeastern Conference, team captain, led the squad for the 2nd straight year with a career-high 113 tackles (61 solo), and ranked 4th in the conference with an average of 9.42 tackles per game. He had 3 sacks, 6.5 stops for losses, 6 quarterback pressures, and he deflected 5 passes and picked off 2 others for 12 yards in returns. In 2006 Goff was a defensive captain and started every game at middle linebacker, extending career consecutive start streak to 27 games. He was named Second-team All-Southeastern Conference. Goff topped Commodores with 67 solo tackles and 93 total tackles, and ranked among team leaders with four quarterback hurries (T-1st), six tackles for loss (T-5th), 2.5 quarterback sacks (5th), and two forced fumbles (T-3rd). In 2005, he concluded the season as team's third leading tackler with 47 solo stops and 63 total tackles including tackles for loss (3), quarterback hurries (2) and a sack. He also had two defended passes. In 2004, he played in every game, starting final four outings at middle linebacker. In 2003, he redshirted.

Goff graduated in December 2007 with a degree in Mechanical Engineering.

== Professional career ==
Pre-draft measurables
Height	Weight	40-yard dash	10-yard split	20-yard split	20-yard shuttle	Three-cone drill	Vertical jump	Broad jump	Bench press
6 ft 2 in (1.88 m)	245 lb (111 kg)	4.63 s	1.53 s	2.64 s	4.26 s	6.86 s	31 1/2 in (0.80 m)	9 ft 10 in (3.00 m)	28 reps
All values from NFL Combine.

=== New York Giants ===
Goff was selected by the New York Giants in the fifth round of the 2008 NFL draft with the 165th overall pick. On December 13, 2009, Goff recorded his first career interception on a pass by Donovan McNabb against the Philadelphia Eagles. In the Giants' game against the Washington Redskins the following week, Goff recorded his first career sack, against quarterback Jason Campbell. In 2010, he became the starting middle linebacker. He tore his right anterior cruciate ligament during practice prior to week 1, ending his 2011 season.

=== Washington Redskins ===
Goff signed with the Washington Redskins on April 30, 2012. He was expected to switch from the middle linebacker position from the Giants' 4-3 defense to an inside linebacker position for the Redskins' 3-4 defense. However, on July 28, 2012, Goff tore the same ACL that he tore in the 2011 season making him miss the entire 2012 season, as well as a consecutive second season. Two days later, the Redskins waived him.

== NFL career statistics ==
Legend
**Bold**	Career high

Year	Team	Games		Tackles					Interceptions					Fumbles			
Year	Team	GP	GS	Cmb	Solo	Ast	Sck	TFL	Int	Yds	TD	Lng	PD	FF	FR	Yds	TD
2008	NYG	5	0	2	2	0	0.0	0	0	0	0	0	0	0	0	0	0
2009	NYG	**16**	4	25	15	10	**1.0**	1	**1**	**5**	0	**5**	**2**	0	0	0	0
2010	NYG	**16**	**16**	**80**	**55**	**25**	**1.0**	**9**	0	0	0	0	**2**	**1**	**1**	**22**	0
		37	20	107	72	35	2.0	10	1	5	0	5	4	1	1	22	0
