= Michael Boley =

American football player (born 1982)

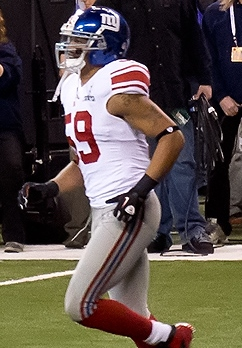
- Boley entering the field for Super Bowl XLVI

No. 59, 52, 53
- Position: Linebacker

Personal information
- Born: August 24, 1982 (age 44); Gadsden, Alabama, U.S.
- Listed height: 6 ft 3 in (1.91 m)
- Listed weight: 230 lb (104 kg)

Career information
- High school: Elkmont (AL)
- College: Southern Miss
- NFL draft: 2005: 5th round, 160th overall pick

Career history
- Atlanta Falcons (2005–2008); New York Giants (2009–2012); Cincinnati Bengals (2013)

Awards and highlights
- Super Bowl champion (XLVI); PFWA All-Rookie Team (2005); First-team All-American (2004); C-USA Defensive Player of the Year (2004); 3× First-team All-Conference USA (2002-2004); Conerly Trophy (2004)

Career NFL statistics
- Total tackles: 699
- Sacks: 9.5
- Forced fumbles: 8
- Fumble recoveries: 9
- Interceptions: 8
- Defensive touchdowns: 2
- Stats at Pro Football Reference

Michael Jerome Boley (born August 24, 1982) is an American former professional football player who was a linebacker in the National Football League (NFL). He played college football for the Southern Miss Golden Eagles and was selected by the Atlanta Falcons in the fifth round of the 2005 NFL draft.

Boley was also a member of the New York Giants and Cincinnati Bengals.

== Early life ==
Boley played high school football for Elkmont High School as a safety, wide receiver, and running back.

== College career ==
Boley played college football for Southern Mississippi. In 2004, he won the Conerly Trophy, which is awarded to the best college football player in the state of Mississippi. During his entire career he finished with 423 tackles, 28.5 sacks, nine forced fumbles and was a three-time First-team All-Conference USA selection. In Boley's last season at Southern Miss he was voted as the conference's defensive most valuable player. He was also a finalist for several national defensive awards, including the Butkus Award, the Bednarik Award and the Lott Impact Trophy. He made 125 tackles as a senior and recorded five forced fumbles, two interceptions, and nine sacks.

== Professional career ==
=== Atlanta Falcons ===
Boley was selected by the Atlanta Falcons in the fifth round of the 2005 NFL draft. He took over as a starter in his rookie year after Edgerton Hartwell went down with an Achilles tendon injury. In four years with the Falcons, he started 52 of 64 games, recording 330 tackles, six sacks, and five interceptions. He became a free agent after the 2008 season.

=== New York Giants ===
On February 27, 2009, Boley signed a five-year, $25 million deal with the New York Giants. He won his first championship ring with the Giants in Super Bowl XLVI against the New England Patriots.

On February 5, 2013, Boley was released by the New York Giants.

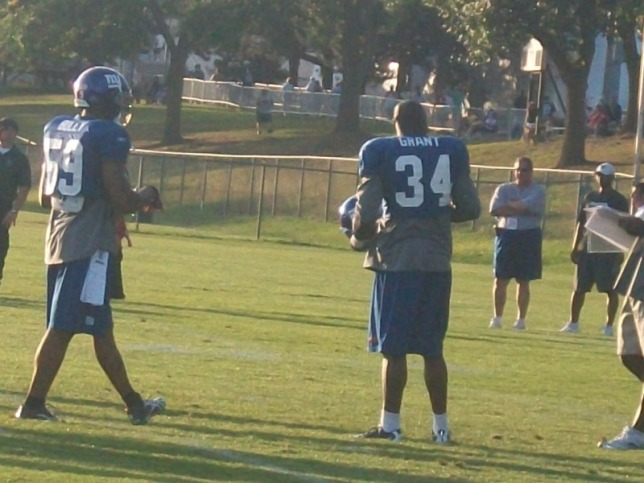
Michael Boley and Deon Grant

=== Cincinnati Bengals ===
On October 1, 2013, Boley signed with the Cincinnati Bengals.

== NFL career statistics ==
Legend
	Led the league
**Bold**	Career high

=== Regular season ===
Year	Team	Games		Tackles					Interceptions					Fumbles			
Year	Team	GP	GS	Cmb	Solo	Ast	Sck	TFL	Int	Yds	TD	Lng	PD	FF	FR	Yds	TD
2005	ATL	**16**	11	64	43	21	0.0	3	0	0	0	0	5	1	0	0	0
2006	ATL	**16**	13	88	69	19	**3.0**	7	2	44	0	40	7	1	**3**	0	0
2007	ATL	**16**	**16**	**110**	**93**	17	**3.0**	5	2	12	0	12	7	**4**	0	0	0
2008	ATL	**16**	12	73	63	10	0.0	2	1	16	0	16	**9**	0	1	0	0
2009	NYG	11	11	84	65	19	1.0	**9**	0	0	0	0	8	0	0	0	0
2010	NYG	**16**	15	85	63	22	1.0	3	0	0	0	0	1	1	0	0	0
2011	NYG	14	13	93	74	19	1.0	4	0	0	0	0	3	1	**3**	**78**	**1**
2012	NYG	**16**	11	92	65	**27**	0.5	4	**3**	**74**	0	**51**	4	0	2	70	**1**
2013	CIN	10	1	10	7	3	0.0	0	0	0	0	0	0	0	0	0	0
		131	103	699	542	157	9.5	37	8	146	0	51	44	8	9	148	2

=== Playoffs ===
Year	Team	Games		Tackles					Interceptions					Fumbles			
Year	Team	GP	GS	Cmb	Solo	Ast	Sck	TFL	Int	Yds	TD	Lng	PD	FF	FR	Yds	TD
2008	ATL	1	1	1	0	1	0.0	0	0	0	0	0	0	0	0	0	0
2011	NYG	**4**	**4**	**27**	**22**	**5**	**2.0**	**3**	0	0	0	0	**2**	0	0	0	0
2013	CIN	1	0	0	0	0	0.0	0	0	0	0	0	0	0	0	0	0
		6	5	28	22	6	2.0	3	0	0	0	0	2	0	0	0	0

== Personal life ==
In February 2013, Boley was arrested for child abuse.

Boley's son McKale Boley is an offensive tackle for the Virginia Cavaliers.
