= Ayanga Okpokowuruk =

American football player (born 1987)

No. 70, 95
- Position: Defensive end

Personal information
- Born: June 19, 1987 (age 39); Charlotte, North Carolina, U.S.
- Listed height: 6 ft 3 in (1.91 m)
- Listed weight: 260 lb (118 kg)

Career information
- High school: Chattanooga (TN) McCallie School
- College: Duke
- NFL draft: 2010: undrafted

Career history
- New York Giants (2010–2011)*; Spokane Shock (2011); Cleveland Browns (2011)*; Arizona Rattlers (2012–2013)*; Jacksonville Sharks (2013)
- * Offseason or practice squad member only
- Stats at Pro Football Reference

Ayanga Okpokowuruk (born June 19, 1987) is an American former professional football player. He played college football at Duke University and attended The McCallie School in Chattanooga, Tennessee. He was a member of the New York Giants, Spokane Shock, Cleveland Browns, Arizona Rattlers and Jacksonville Sharks.

== Early life ==
Okpokowuruk was a four-year letterman for The McCallie School Blue Tornadoes. He earned all-state and all-city honors his senior year in 2004 after recording 39 tackles and five sacks as the team went 8-3 and advanced to the state semifinals. He recorded 30 tackles and four sacks while catching 12 passes for 210 yards and one touchdown his junior season, being named honorable mention all-state as the Blue Tornadoes finished with a 7-5 record and state semifinal berth. Okpokowuruk also participated in basketball and track and field, placing fourth in the state in the shot put competition.

== College career ==
Okpokowuruk played for the Duke Blue Devils from 2005 to 2009. He played in 47 games, recording 108 tackles, 10.5 sacks and two forced fumbles.

== Professional career ==
Okpokowuruk signed with the New York Giants of the National Football League (NFL) on April 24, 2010 after going undrafted in the 2010 NFL draft. He was released by the Giants on July 30, 2010. He signed a future contracts with the Giants on January 13, 2011, and was released by the team on September 3, 2011.

Okpokowuruk was assigned to the Spokane Shock of the Arena Football League (AFL) on May 26, 2011. He appeared in six games for the Shock during the 2011 season, recording eight tackles and a sack.

On November 29, 2011, the Cleveland Browns of the NFL signed Okpokowuruk to the team's practice squad.

Okpokowuruk was assigned to the AFL's Arizona Rattlers on November 29, 2012.

Okpokowuruk was traded to the Jacksonville Sharks on March 16, 2013. He recorded 3.5 tackles for the Sharks in 2013.
