= Terrell Thomas =

American football player (born 1985)

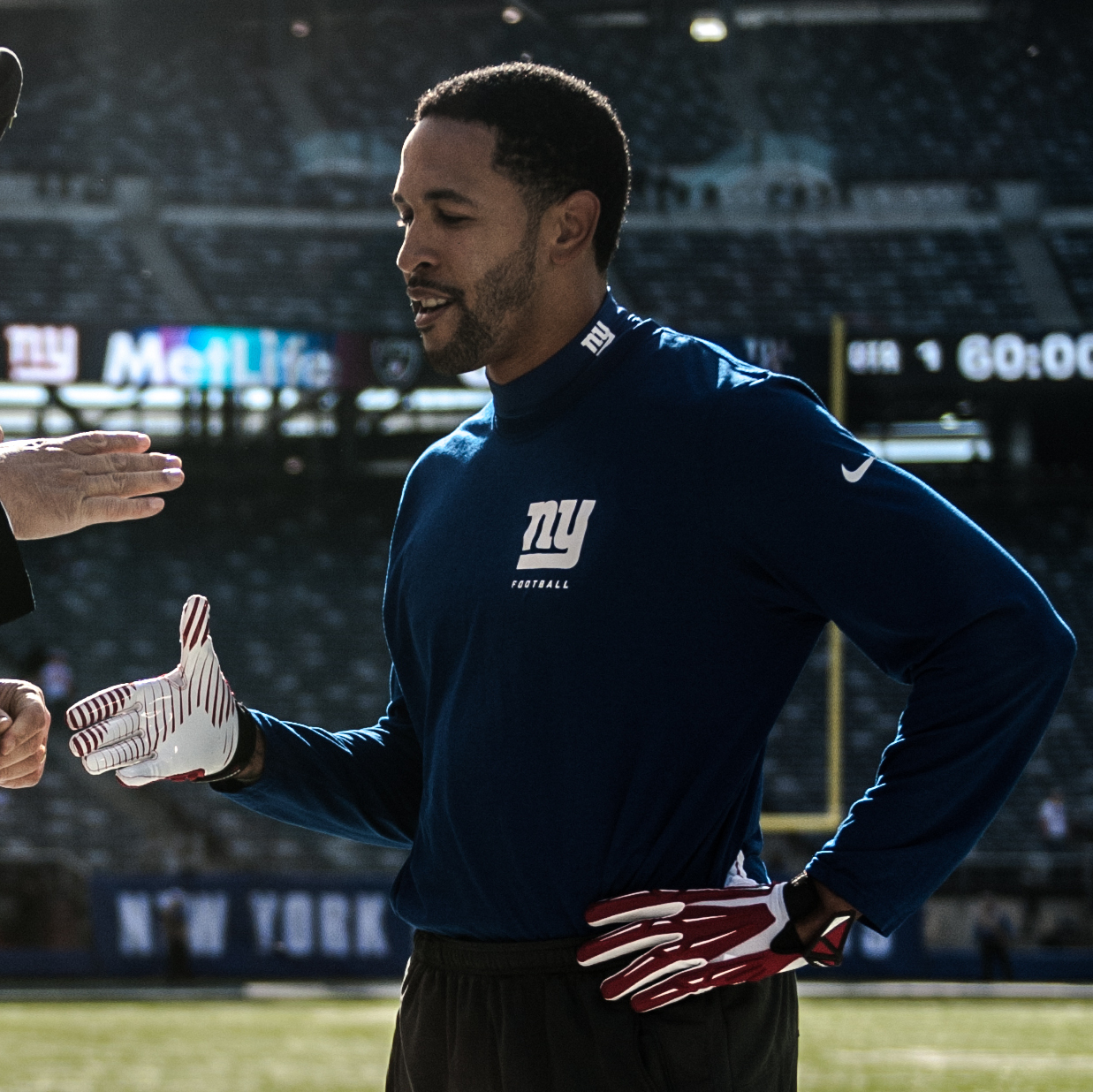
- Thomas with the New York Giants in 2013

No. 24
- Position: Cornerback

Personal information
- Born: January 8, 1985 (age 41); Pasadena, California, U.S.
- Listed height: 6 ft 1 in (1.85 m)
- Listed weight: 197 lb (89 kg)

Career information
- High school: Rancho Cucamonga (Rancho Cucamonga, California)
- College: USC
- NFL draft: 2008: 2nd round, 63rd overall pick

Career history
- New York Giants (2008–2013); Seattle Seahawks (2014)*
- * Offseason or practice squad member only

Awards and highlights
- Super Bowl champion (XLVI); Second-team All-Pac-10 (2006, 2007)

Career NFL statistics
- Total tackles: 298
- Sacks: 3.0
- Forced fumbles: 7
- Fumble recoveries: 2
- Interceptions: 12
- Defensive touchdowns: 1
- Stats at Pro Football Reference

Terrell R. Thomas (born January 8, 1985) is an American former professional football player who was a cornerback in the National Football League (NFL). He played college football for the USC Trojans. He was selected by the New York Giants in the second round of the 2008 NFL draft. He is also only the second player in NFL history, after linebacker Thomas Davis, to play a down in the league after suffering from three torn ACLs in the same knee.

== Early life ==
Thomas prepped at Rancho Cucamonga High School.

Received a scholarship offer from Oregon State and was labeled one of the most athletic players in the state after his sophomore year.

As a junior, he racked up 78 tackles and 5 interceptions, and had 15 catches for 250 yards and 6 touchdowns. Received All Baseline League honors for the second year in a row.

As a senior, he had 300 yards receiving to go with 5 touchdowns. He rushed for 1,300 yards and had 16 rushing touchdowns. He added 600 yards returning for a total of 2,200 yards of total offense. On the defensive side of the ball he had 115 tackles, 7 deflections, 4 forced fumbles and one fumble recovery. He was named the league's MVP and Area Offensive Player of the year. He was selected to the 2002 Super Prep All-American team, All CIF Division II first team, Tom Lemming All-West, LA Times All-Inland Empire First Team and Press Telegram's Best in the West First Team.

== College career ==
Thomas played college football at the University of Southern California under head coach Pete Carroll. He was named a 2007 third-team preseason All-American. He was also named to the 2007 Jim Thorpe Award Watch List.

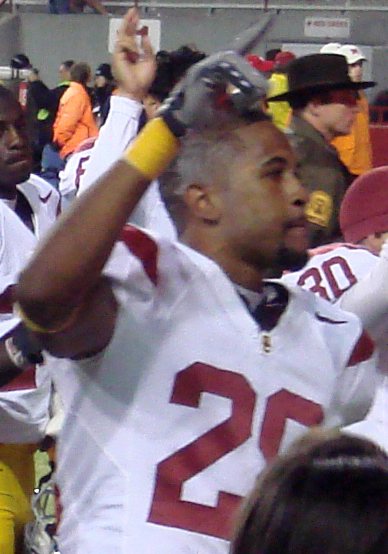
Thomas in 2007

As a senior at USC in 2007, he had 57 passes thrown his way, allowing only 29.8% of those passes to be completed. He gave up 17 catches for 149 yards and one touchdown. On average he gave up 8.76 yards per catch and allowed 2.61 yards per pass attempt. He also had four interceptions and was voted to his second straight All-Pac-10 second team. Prior to the start of 2007 spring drills, Thomas underwent surgery to repair a left shoulder dislocation. He returned to start all 13 games and again received All-Pac-10 second-team recognition. Thomas ranked ninth on the squad with 45 tackles (31 solo) and had a sack with 4.5 stops for losses. He forced three fumbles, recovered another and batted away seven passes. He also gained 44 yards on four interception returns. He was the senior member and leader of the secondary that held Brady Quinn to his lowest college completion percentage in a November 2006 game. He was a coaches and Rivals.com second-team all-Pac-10 in 2006.

In 2005, Thomas took over strong side (right) cornerback for the first two games of the 2005 season, but he suffered torn ligaments in his right knee against Arkansas, underwent surgery and was lost for the rest of the year. He finished with five solo tackles and a pass break-up. Thomas reclaimed his right cornerback job in 2006, earning All-Pac-10 Conference second-team honors. He ranked seventh on the team with 50 tackles (35 solo) and had three sacks for losses of 32 yards. He added two fumble recoveries, including one he returned for a touchdown. He also intercepted two passes and deflected 12 others. In 2004, Thomas played in 11 games as a reserve cornerback after moving over from free safety in spring drills; most of his playing time was in the dime packages and on special teams. He made nine tackles (seven solo), but also batted away a pair of passes and intercepted two others.

== Professional career ==
Pre-draft measurables
Height	Weight	40-yard dash	10-yard split	20-yard split	20-yard shuttle	Three-cone drill	Vertical jump	Broad jump	Bench press	Wonderlic
6 ft 1 in (1.85 m)	202 lb (92 kg)	4.45 s	1.45 s	2.54 s	X s	7.18 s	30.5 in (0.77 m)	10 ft 3 in (3.12 m)	14 reps	20
All values from NFL Combine

=== New York Giants ===
==== 2008 ====
Thomas was selected by the New York Giants in the second round of the 2008 NFL draft, after projecting to be a third-round pick. Thomas was the 63rd overall pick of the draft and the final pick of the second round.

Thomas missed games in his rookie season due to injuries. When he recovered from his injury he played behind Corey Webster and Aaron Ross. Thomas made the first interception of his NFL career against the Arizona Cardinals in week 12 of the 2008 NFL season, returning it 13 yards. Thomas ended his rookie season by playing in 12 games and starting two. He mostly played in nickel packages and contributed in special teams. He accounted for 45 tackles, one interception, four passes defended and one forced fumble.

==== 2009 ====
In the 2009 season, Thomas was once again behind Webster and Ross on the depth chart. During training camp Ross was hampered by a hamstring injury. This move allowed Thomas to take snaps as the second corner. Ross's inability to heal from his hamstring injury placed Thomas as the starting corner for the 2009 season. Thomas took advantage of the opportunity; before the bye, Thomas had 41 tackles, nine passes defended, three interceptions, one sack and one forced fumble. Aaron Ross was able to come back after the bye but Thomas held on firmly to his starting spot. Ross was asked to split time as free safety due to lack of depth at the position. When the Giants played the Washington Redskins, Thomas contributed four tackles, two passes defended, and one interception that was returned for a touchdown in a Giants' victory of 45–12. Thomas finished the season as the number one corner because of injuries to Corey Webster and Aaron Ross being placed on injured reserve. His stats were 85 tackles (the highest on the team), five interceptions, one sack, 18 passes defended and one forced fumble. He was tied for twelfth in interceptions in the league.

==== 2011 ====
On August 22, 2011, in a preseason game against the Chicago Bears, Thomas tore his ACL, ending his season. He was placed on injured reserve on August 23. On March 13, 2012, Thomas re-signed with the Giants.

==== 2012 ====
Thomas suffered an injury to his surgically repaired ACL early in training camp, but he expected to recover and return sometime during the 2012 season. On August 31, 2012, Thomas was placed on season-ending injured reserve.

==== 2013 ====
In 2013, Thomas became the second player to come back from three torn ACLs in the same knee, joining Carolina Panthers linebacker Thomas Davis, who tore his ACL in each year from 2009 to 2011. Thomas' production was largely speculated to severely decrease after the three ACL tears, yet Thomas quickly recovered from his injuries and totaled 67 tackles, one interception, and 16 games played over the course of his 2013 season.

=== Seattle Seahawks ===
On July 28, 2014, Thomas was signed by the Seattle Seahawks. Thomas was cut by the Seahawks on August 24, 2014.

On February 12, 2015, Thomas announced his retirement.

=== Statistics ===
Year	Team	Games	Combined tackles	Tackles	Assisted tackles	Sacks	Forced fumbles	Fumble recoveries	Fumble return yards	Interceptions	Interception return yards	Average Yards per Interception Return	Longest interception return	Interceptions returned for touchdown	Pass Defended	Stuffs	Stuff Yards	Kicks Blocked
2008	NYG	12	45	39	6	0.0	1	0	0	1	13	13	13	0	4	4	9	1
2009	NYG	16	85	70	15	1.0	1	0	0	5	87	17	33	1	13	6	21	0
2010	NYG	16	101	81	20	1.0	4	1	0	5	56	11	28	0	21	4	10	1
2013	NYG	16	67	58	9	1.0	1	0	0	1	65	65	65	0	7	1	2	0
Total	Total	60	298	248	50	3.0	7	1	0	12	221	18	65	1	45	15	42	2
