= Adrian Tracy =

American football player (born 1988)

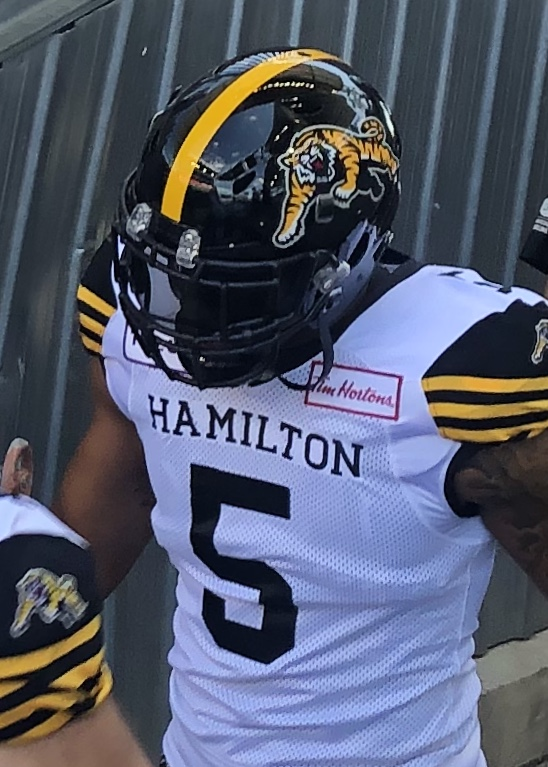
- Tracy with the Hamilton Tiger-Cats in 2019

No. 98
- Position: Defensive lineman

Personal information
- Born: April 6, 1988 (age 38); Fairfax, Virginia, U.S.
- Listed height: 6 ft 3 in (1.91 m)
- Listed weight: 248 lb (112 kg)

Career information
- High school: Potomac Falls (Sterling, Virginia)
- College: William & Mary
- NFL draft: 2010: 6th round, 184th overall pick

Career history
- New York Giants (2010–2012); Arizona Cardinals (2014)*; Hamilton Tiger-Cats (2015–2019); Montreal Alouettes (2020)*; Toronto Argonauts (2022)*
- * Offseason or practice squad member only

Awards and highlights
- Super Bowl champion (XLVI); 2× FCS All-American (2008, 2009)

Career NFL statistics
- Total tackles: 12
- Sacks: 1
- Forced fumbles: 1
- Stats at Pro Football Reference
- Stats at CFL.ca

Adrian D'Sean Tracy (born April 6, 1988) is an American former professional football player who was a defensive end in the National Football League (NFL) and Canadian Football League (CFL). He was selected by the New York Giants in the sixth round (184th overall) of the 2010 NFL draft. Tracy played college football for the William & Mary Tribe.

== Professional career ==
=== New York Giants ===
Tracy was signed to a multi-year deal with the Giants in June 2010, after being selected by them in the sixth round of the 2010 NFL Draft. In preseason, he suffered a dislocated elbow and was placed on IR for the remainder of the season. He was waived by the Giants on September 3, 2011, but was re-signed to the practice squad the next day.

=== Arizona Cardinals ===
Tracy was signed to a reserve/future contract with the Arizona Cardinals on January 9, 2014. The Cardinals released Tracy on August 30, 2014.

=== Hamilton Tiger-Cats ===
Tracy signed with the Hamilton Tiger-Cats on December 17, 2014. He played in regular season games over five years for the Tiger-Cats, recording 131 defensive tackles, 21 sacks, five forced fumbles, and two interceptions. He became a free agent on February 11, 2020.

=== Montreal Alouettes ===
On February 13, 2020, Tracy signed with the Montreal Alouettes. However, the 2020 CFL season was cancelled and he did not play in 2020. His contract expired on February 9, 2021, and he did not sign with a team in 2021.

=== Toronto Argonauts ===
On February 9, 2022, it was announced that Tracy had signed with the Toronto Argonauts. However, he was released with the final training camp cuts on June 5, 2022.

== Coaching career ==
=== Athletes Untapped ===
Tracy signed with Athletes Untapped as a private football coach on November 21, 2024.
