= Mario Manningham =

American football player (born 1986)

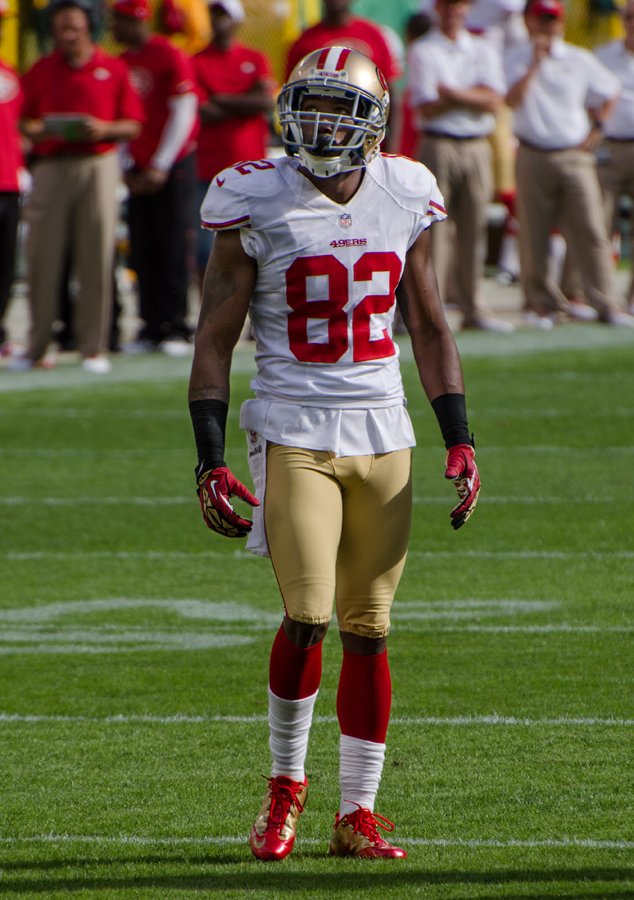
- Manningham with the San Francisco 49ers in 2012

No. 82, 86
- Position: Wide receiver

Personal information
- Born: May 25, 1986 (age 40); Warren, Ohio, U.S.
- Listed height: 5 ft 11 in (1.80 m)
- Listed weight: 185 lb (84 kg)

Career information
- High school: Warren G. Harding (Warren)
- College: Michigan (2005–2007)
- NFL draft: 2008: 3rd round, 95th overall pick

Career history
- New York Giants (2008–2011); San Francisco 49ers (2012–2013); New York Giants (2014)

Awards and highlights
- Super Bowl champion (XLVI); Second-team All-American (2007); 2× First-team All-Big Ten (2006, 2007)

Career NFL statistics
- Receptions: 211
- Receiving yards: 2,849
- Receiving touchdowns: 19
- Stats at Pro Football Reference

Mario Cashmere Manningham (born May 25, 1986) is an American former professional football player who was a wide receiver in the National Football League (NFL). He was an All-American college football player at the University of Michigan, and was selected by the New York Giants in the third round of the 2008 NFL draft. Manningham won Super Bowl XLVI with the Giants, defeating the New England Patriots, and catching a crucial 38-yard pass in the final minutes. He also played two seasons with the San Francisco 49ers.

== College career ==
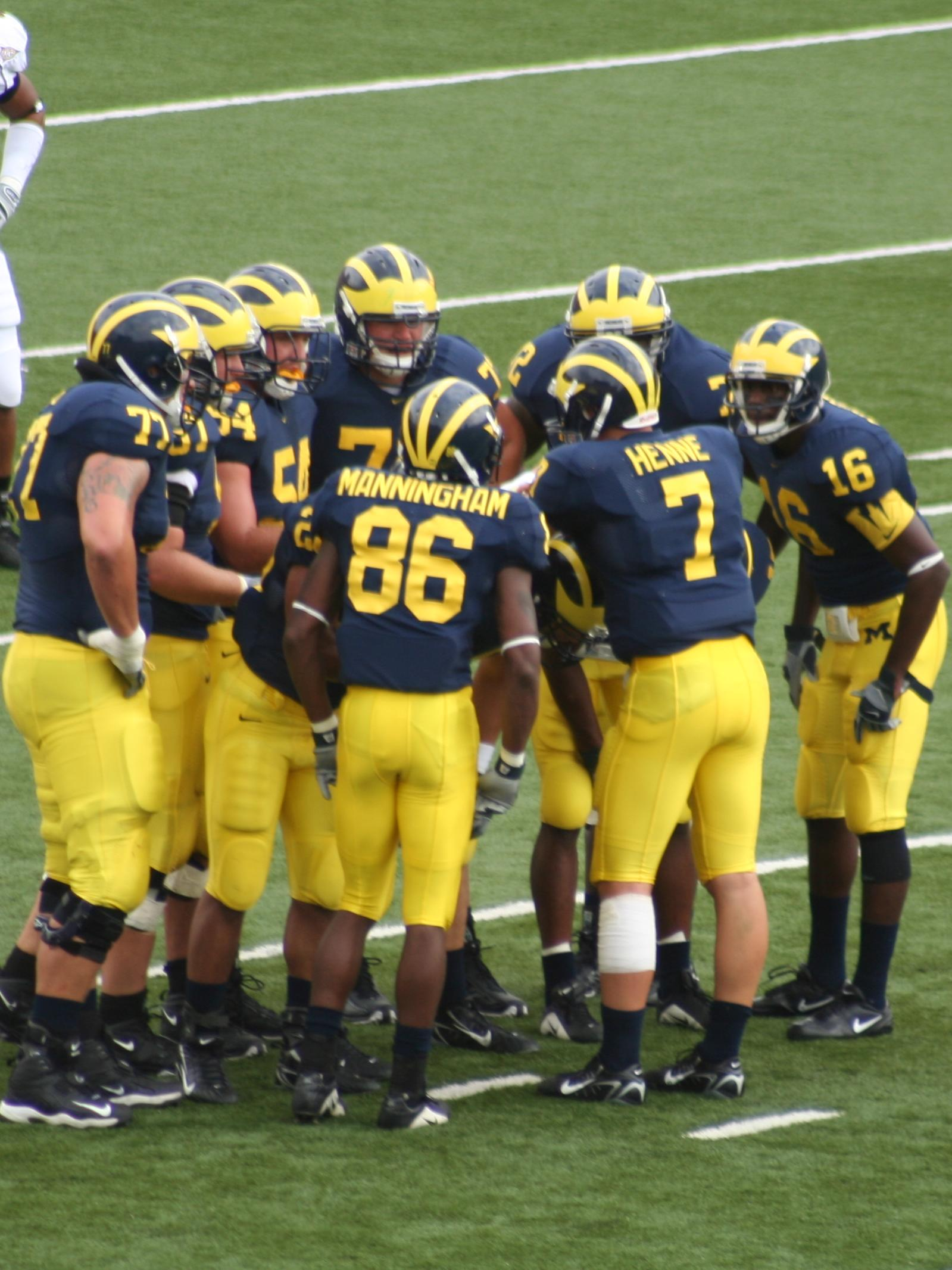
2006 Michigan Wolverines football team huddle with #86 Manningham, #7 Chad Henne, #16 Adrian Arrington, #72 Rueben Riley, #54 Mark Bihl, #77 Jake Long, #83 Mike Massey, #65 Justin Boren, #85 Carson Butler, and #52 Stephen Schilling against Central Michigan

In 2005, as a freshman, Manningham recorded 27 receptions for 433 yards and six touchdowns, including the game-winning touchdown catch as time expired in the game against Penn State on October 15, handing the Nittany Lions their only loss that season.

Manningham finished 2006 with a total 38 receptions 703 yards and nine touchdowns. He was named Big Ten Offensive Player of the Week two weeks in a row, first against Notre Dame and then against Wisconsin. During the sixth game of the season against Michigan State, Manningham injured his knee and underwent arthroscopic knee surgery on October 10. Manningham made his first game appearance after the injury as a reserve wide receiver on November 4 against Ball State.

Manningham had a total of 72 receptions for 1,174 yards and 12 touchdowns in 2007, and was named a second-team All-American.

After the 2007 season, Manningham opted to forgo his eligibility for his senior year and entered the 2008 NFL draft. He finished his career at Michigan with 137 receptions for 2,310 yards and 27 touchdowns. Those marks placed him fifth and fourth all-time in school history in touchdowns and yards.

== Professional career ==
=== Pre-draft ===
Pre-draft measurables
Height	Weight	Arm length	Hand span	40-yard dash	10-yard split	20-yard split	20-yard shuttle	Three-cone drill	Vertical jump	Broad jump	Bench press
5 ft 11 3/4 in (1.82 m)	181 lb (82 kg)	32 1/8 in (0.82 m)	9 in (0.23 m)	4.42 s	1.50 s	2.56 s	4.27 s	7.34 s	35.0 in (0.89 m)	9 ft 9 in (2.97 m)	16 reps
All values from NFL Combine/Pro Day

Manningham had reportedly been removed from "multiple teams'" draft boards due to alleged marijuana use in college. Mario denied testing positive initially, then sent a letter to all 32 teams admitting he lied. Manningham claims he failed two drug tests at Michigan. Bob McGinn of the Milwaukee Journal-Sentinel reported that Manningham scored a 6 out of 50 on the Wonderlic exam. This along with several other problems caused his draft value to drop.

=== New York Giants (first stint) ===
==== 2008 season ====
Manningham was selected in the third round (95th overall) of the 2008 NFL draft by the New York Giants. During rookie training camp, Manningham noted that he looked forward to playing with fellow former Michigan Wolverine Amani Toomer. Manningham signed a four-year deal worth up to $2.3 million. Manningham made his first reception on October 5, 2008, in a game against the Seattle Seahawks which the Giants won by a score of 44–6.

==== 2009 season ====
Manningham worked on his punt return abilities and competed for the punt returner spot in 2009.

Manningham kicked off the 2009 season by catching three passes for 58 yards and a touchdown en route to the Giants' 23–17 win over the Washington Redskins. He followed this up by catching 10 passes for 150 yards and a juggling sliding catch for a touchdown in the Giants' 33–31 win over the Dallas Cowboys.

Manningham became the starting wide receiver opposite Steve Smith after fellow receiver Domenik Hixon was injured in a Week 2 game against the Dallas Cowboys.

==== 2010 season ====
In the 2010 season, Manningham appeared in all 16 games of the Giants' 10–6 season. In Week 15, against the Philadelphia Eagles, he recorded eight receptions for 113 yards and two touchdowns in the 38–31 loss. The next week, he followed up with four receptions for 132 yards and a touchdown in a 45–17 loss to the Green Bay Packers. In the Giants' final game of the 2010 regular season, he recorded four receptions for 101 yards and a touchdown in a 17–14 win over the Washington Redskins. On the season, he recorded 60 receptions for 944 yards and nine touchdowns.

==== 2011 season ====
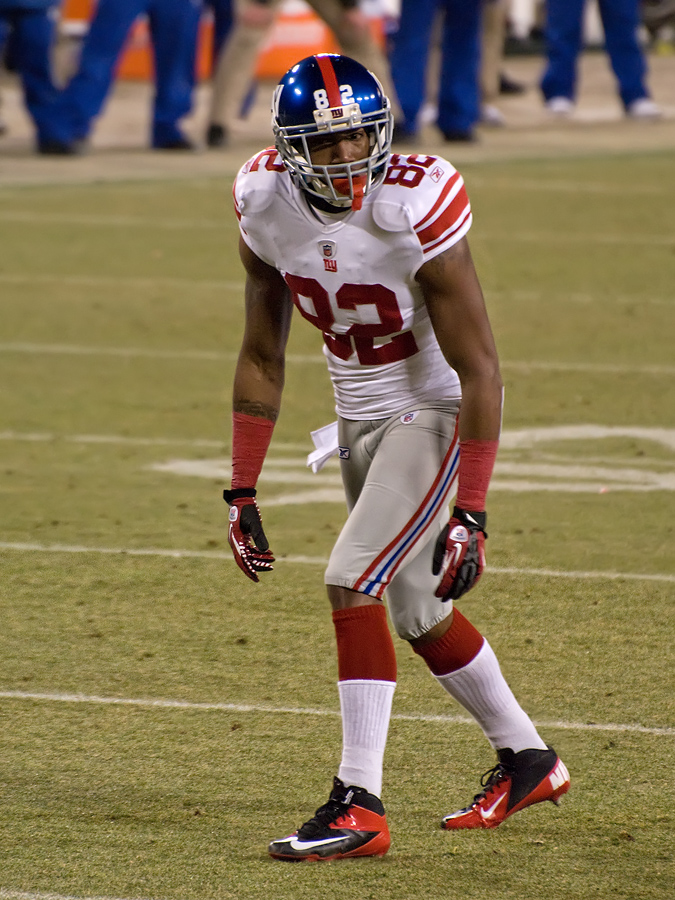
Mario Manningham on January 15, 2012, in a game against the Green Bay Packers.

In the 2011 regular season, Manningham recorded 39 receptions for 523 yards and four touchdowns. In Weeks 8–10, he recorded a touchdown in three consecutive games.

On February 5, 2012, Manningham made a catch in the fourth quarter of Super Bowl XLVI to set up the win against the New England Patriots. Trailing by 2 points with 3 minutes and 46 seconds remaining, the Giants started the winning drive. Eli Manning lofted a long pass down the left sideline to Manningham, who kept his feet in-bounds by a fraction of an inch with two defenders around him for a gain of 38 yards. The Giants went on to beat the Patriots by a score of 21–17. Manningham ended the game with 5 catches for 73 yards.

=== San Francisco 49ers ===
==== 2012 season ====
Manningham signed a two-year, $7.375 million contract with the San Francisco 49ers on March 22, 2012.

On September 9, he made his 49ers debut in the season opener against the Green Bay Packers. He had four receptions for 29 yards in the 30–22 victory. On October 7, in Week 5 against the Buffalo Bills, he recorded his first touchdown as a 49er, a 10-yard reception from quarterback Alex Smith.

On December 23, 2012, he tore his ACL and PCL in his left knee against division rival, the Seattle Seahawks, in a game the 49ers lost 42–13. The next day, the 49ers stated that Manningham would be out for the season. Even without Manningham, the 49ers reached Super Bowl XLVII, but lost to the Baltimore Ravens 34–31.

==== 2013 season ====
On August 27, 2013, the 49ers placed Manningham on the reserve/physically unable to perform list. Manningham was activated by the 49ers on November 4, 2013, after recovering from the injury sustained against the Seahawks. After seeing limited duty, Manningham was placed on the injured reserve list on December 27, 2013, ending his season. He finished the 2013 season with nine receptions for 85 yards.

=== New York Giants (second stint) ===
On March 18, 2014, Manningham signed a one-year contract to return to the New York Giants. After straining his calf in the last preseason game, he was placed on injured reserve and then released by the Giants.

== NFL career statistics ==
=== Regular season ===
Year	Team	Games		Receiving					Rushing					Fumbles	
Year	Team	GP	GS	Rec	Yds	Avg	Lng	TD	Att	Yds	Avg	Lng	TD	Fum	Lost
2008	NYG	7	0	4	26	6.5	11	0	1	-12	-12.0	-12	0	0	0
2009	NYG	14	10	57	822	14.4	49	5	—	—	—	—	—	1	1
2010	NYG	16	8	60	944	15.7	92T	9	1	2	2.0	2	0	1	1
2011	NYG	12	10	39	523	13.4	47T	4	—	—	—	—	—	0	0
2012	SF	11	9	41	449	11.0	40	1	3	64	21.3	29	0	1	0
2013	SF	6	3	9	85	9.4	14	0	—	—	—	—	—	0	0
Career		67	40	210	2,849	13.5	92	19	5	54	10.8	29	0	3	2

=== Postseason ===
Year	Team	Games		Receiving					Rushing					Fumbles	
Year	Team	GP	GS	Rec	Yds	Avg	Lng	TD	Att	Yds	Avg	Lng	TD	Fum	Lost
2011	NYG	4	2	13	189	14.5	38	3	—	—	—	—	—	0	0
Total		4	2	13	189	14.5	38	3	0	0	0.0	0	0	0	0

== See also ==
- Lists of Michigan Wolverines football receiving leaders
