= 2008 New York Giants season =

84th season in franchise history

- Owner: John Mara; Steve Tisch
- General manager: Jerry Reese
- Head coach: Tom Coughlin
- Offensive coordinator: Kevin Gilbride
- Defensive coordinator: Steve Spagnuolo
- Home stadium: Giants Stadium

Results
- Record: 12–4
- Division place: 1st NFC East
- Playoffs: Lost Divisional Playoffs (vs. Eagles) 11–23
- All-Pros: 6: G Chris Snee (1st team); DE Justin Tuck (1st team); FB Madison Hedgecock (2nd team); T David Diehl (2nd team); C Shaun O'Hara (2nd team); K John Carney (2nd team)
- Pro Bowlers: 7: QB Eli Manning; G Chris Snee; C Shaun O'Hara; DE Justin Tuck; K John Carney; P Jeff Feagles; LS Zak DeOssie

Uniform
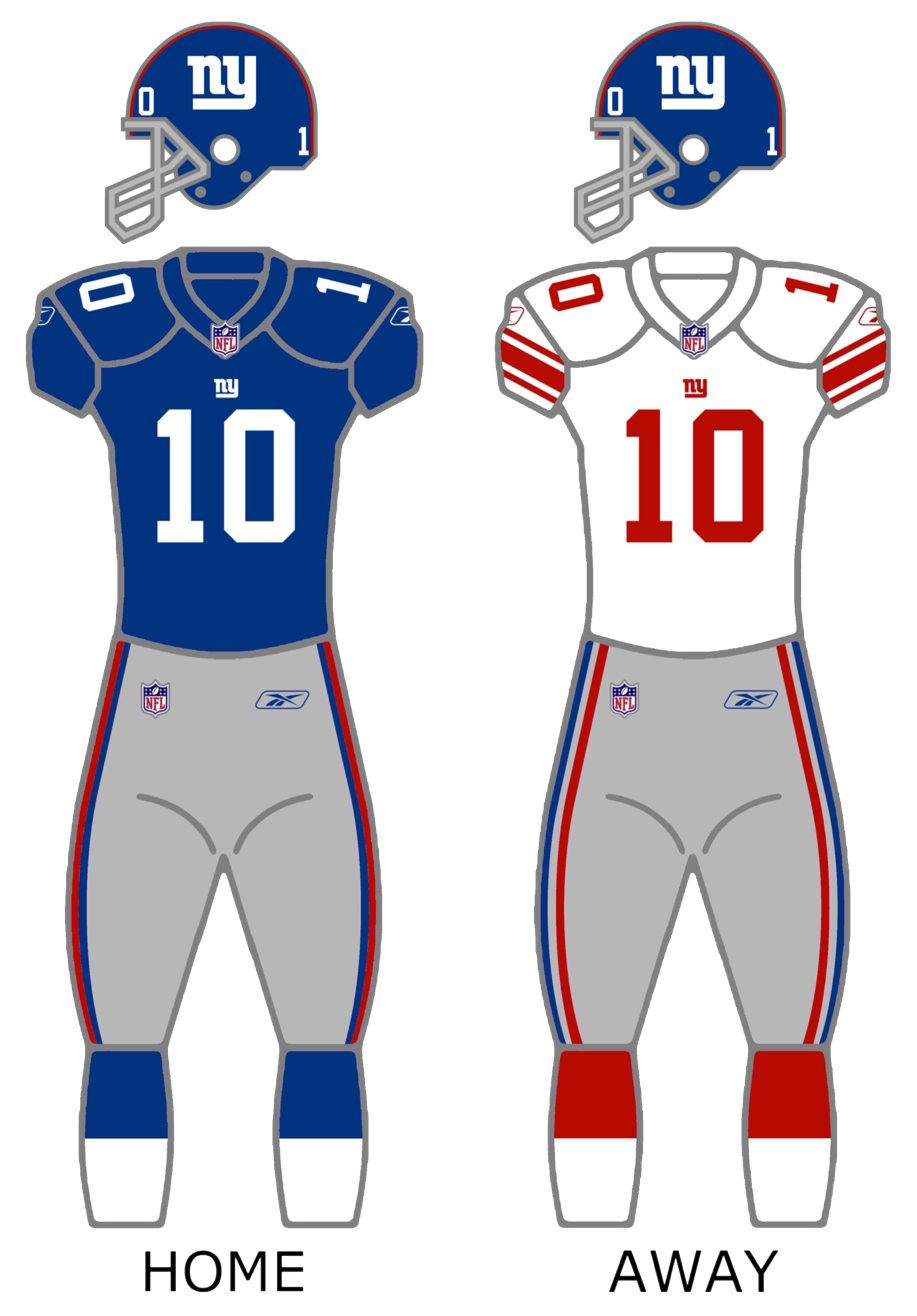

The 2008 New York Giants season was the franchise's 84th season in the National Football League (NFL) and their fifth under head coach Tom Coughlin. The team looked to defend its Super Bowl XLII title along with trying to become the first team since rival 2004 New England Patriots and the first NFC team since division rival 1993 Dallas Cowboys to win consecutive Super Bowls. They improved upon their 10–6 record from 2007, becoming NFC East champions and finished with the #1 seed in the NFC playoffs for the only time in the Tom Coughlin era. Despite a franchise best 11–1 start and clinching the number 1 seed for the first time in eight years, the Giants lost three of their last four games, including their first playoff game against the Eagles 23–11, ending their season. The Giants were the only NFC team from the 2007 playoffs to qualify for the 2008 playoffs.

For the first time since 1992, Michael Strahan was not on the opening day roster.

The 2008 season was the first and only time in franchise history the Giants qualified for the playoffs for the fourth consecutive season. This was also the first time that the Giants made the playoffs the year after making the Super Bowl, after missing the playoffs in 1987 (following win in Super Bowl XXI), 1991 (following win in Super Bowl XXV), and 2001 (following loss in Super Bowl XXXV).

The 2008 Giants led the NFL in rushing and set a franchise record with 2,518 rushing yards. Their running attack was headlined by the trio of Brandon Jacobs, Derrick Ward, and Ahmad Bradshaw, respectively nicknamed "Earth, Wind, and Fire." The Giants became the fifth team in NFL history with two players to rush for more than 1,000 yards: Jacobs (1,089) and Ward (1,025). Ward signed with the Tampa Bay Buccaneers after the season while Jacobs and Bradshaw won another Super Bowl with the Giants in 2011.

== Offseason ==
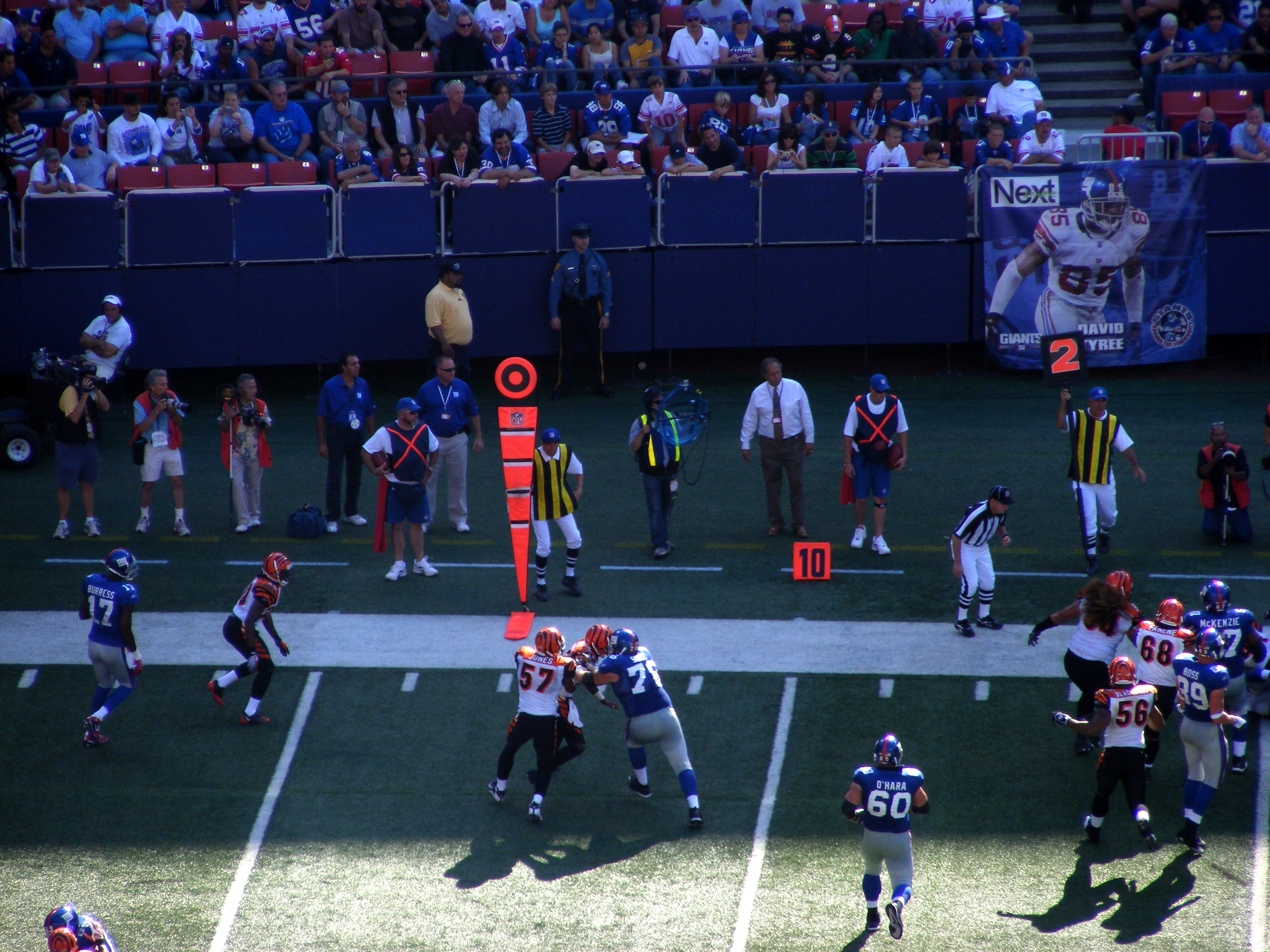
The Cincinnati Bengals visit Giants Stadium, September 21

=== Player and personnel moves ===
==== Releases and injuries ====
On February 29, the first day of free agency, Giants free agent linebacker Kawika Mitchell left the team to join the Buffalo Bills, safety Gibril Wilson went to the Oakland Raiders, and linebacker Reggie Torbor joined the Miami Dolphins.

On March 14, free agent defensive tackle William Joseph departed to join Wilson with the Raiders.

On April 10, defensive tackle Manuel Wright was released.

On June 9, 15-year veteran, and seven-time Pro-Bowler, Michael Strahan retired and joined the Fox NFL Sunday team.

On August 26, undrafted rookie free-agent Terrance Stringer was waived.

=== Draft class ===
Round	Selection	Player	Position	College
1	31	Kenny Phillips	Safety	Miami (Fla.)
2	63	Terrell Thomas	Cornerback	USC
3	95	Mario Manningham	Wide receiver	Michigan
4	123	Bryan Kehl	Outside linebacker	BYU
5	165	Jonathan Goff	Linebacker	Vanderbilt
6	198	Andre' Woodson	Quarterback	Kentucky
6	199	Robert Henderson	Defensive end	Southern Miss

NOTES:

The Giants move up one overall position in the first round due to the forfeiture of the New England Patriots first round draft pick.

- Giants traded RB Ryan Grant to the Green Bay Packers in exchange for a sixth round pick.
- Giants traded their 7th round pick to the Kansas City Chiefs in exchange for Placekicker Lawrence Tynes in the previous season.

== Staff ==
2008 New York Giants staff
Front office: President/CEO – John Mara; Chairman/Executive Vice President – Steve Tisch; Senior vice president/general manager – Jerry Reese; Vice president of player evaluation – Chris Mara; Assistant general manager – Kevin Abrams; Director of pro personnel – David Gettleman; Assistant director of pro personnel – Ken Sternfeld; Director of college scouting – Marc Ross; Head coaches: Head coach – Tom Coughlin; Offensive coaches: Offensive coordinator – Kevin Gilbride; Quarterbacks – Chris Palmer; Running backs – Jerald Ingram; Wide receivers – Mike Sullivan; Tight ends – Mike Pope; Offensive line – Pat Flaherty; Assistant offensive line – Robert Nickens; Offensive quality control – Sean Ryan	Defensive coaches: Defensive coordinator – Steve Spagnuolo; Linebackers- Bill Sheridan; Defensive line – Mike Waufle; Defensive backs – Peter Giunta; Secondary/safeties – David Merritt; Defensive quality control – Andre Curtis; Special Team coaches: Special teams coordinator – Tom Quinn; Assistant special teams – Thomas McGaughey; Strength and conditioning: Strength and conditioning – Jerry Palmieri; Assistant strength and conditioning – Markus Paul

== Final roster ==
New York Giants 2008 final roster
**Quarterbacks**: 8 David Carr; 10 **Eli Manning**; **Running backs**: 44 Ahmad Bradshaw; 39 Madison Hedgecock FB; 27 Brandon Jacobs; 34 Derrick Ward; 28 DJ Ware; **Wide receivers**: 80 Derek Hagan; 87 Domenik Hixon; 82 Mario Manningham; 83 Sinorice Moss; 12 Steve Smith; 81 Amani Toomer; **Tight ends**: 89 Kevin Boss; 84 Darcy Johnson; 88 Michael Matthews	**Offensive linemen**: 77 Kevin Boothe G/T; 66 David Diehl T; 61 Adam Koets T; 67 Kareem McKenzie T; 60 **Shaun O'Hara** C; 65 Grey Ruegamer C/G; 69 Rich Seubert G; 76 **Chris Snee** G; **Defensive linemen**: 93 Jay Alford DT; 73 Jeremy Clark DT; 96 Barry Cofield DT; 78 Leger Douzable DT; 97 Mathias Kiwanuka DE; 95 Jerome McDougle DE; 98 Fred Robbins DT; 71 Dave Tollefson DE; 91 **Justin Tuck** DE; 99 Renaldo Wynn DE	**Linebackers**: 57 Chase Blackburn OLB; 55 Danny Clark OLB; 53 Bryan Kehl OLB; 58 Antonio Pierce MLB; 52 Edmond Miles MLB; 59 Gerris Wilkinson OLB; **Defensive backs**: 37 James Butler SS; 35 Kevin Dockery CB; 20 Michael Johnson FS; 29 Sam Madison CB; 25 R. W. McQuarters CB; 21 Kenny Phillips SS; 31 Aaron Ross CB; 24 Terrell Thomas CB; 23 Corey Webster CB; **Special teams**: 5 **John Carney** K; 51 **Zak DeOssie** LS; 18 **Jeff Feagles** P; 9 Lawrence Tynes K	**Reserve lists**: 17 Plaxico Burress WR (NF-Inj.); 30 Craig Dahl S (IR); 22 Reuben Droughns RB (IR); 54 Jonathan Goff LB (IR); -- Kay-Jay Harris RB (IR); 90 Robert Henderson DE (IR); 26 Sammy Knight S (IR); 85 David Tyree WR (IR); 72 Osi Umenyiora DE (IR); 79 Guy Whimper OT (IR); 2 Anthony Wright QB (IR); **Practice squad**: 33 Rashad Barksdale CB; 19 Taye Biddle WR; 70 Mike Fladell G; 36 Travonti Johnson S; 68 Cliff Louis G; 86 Martrez Milner TE; 15 Micah Rucker WR; 3 Andre' Woodson QB; rookies in italics **Pro Bowlers in bold** 53 active, 11 inactive, 8 practice squad

== 2008 season ==
=== Preseason schedule ===
Week	Date	Time	Opponent	Result	Game site	Record	NFL Recap
1	August 7, 2008	7:00 P.M.	at Detroit Lions	L 10–13	Ford Field	0–1	Recap
2	August 18, 2008	8:00 P.M.	Cleveland Browns	W 37–34	Giants Stadium	1–1	Recap
3	August 23, 2008	7:00 P.M.	at New York Jets	L 7–10	Giants Stadium	1–2	Recap
4	August 28, 2008	7:00 P.M.	New England Patriots	W 19–14	Giants Stadium	2–2	Recap

=== Regular season ===
The Giants began their title defense in the traditional NFL Kickoff game like previous champions when they played the Washington Redskins at Giants Stadium. Traditionally, this game is usually played on the first Thursday following Labor Day in the United States. This day fell on September 4, 2008.

On March 26, the NFL, NBC, and the Republican National Committee agreed in principle to move the kickoff time of the opener to 7:00 pm EDT instead of 8:30 pm EDT to accommodate the 2008 Republican National Convention.

Week	Date	Time	Opponent	Result	Game site	Record	TV	NFL Recap
1	September 4	7:00 P.M.	Washington Redskins	W 16–7	Giants Stadium	1–0	NBC	Recap
2	September 14	1:00 P.M.	at St. Louis Rams	W 41–13	Edward Jones Dome	2–0	Fox	Recap
3	September 21	1:00 P.M.	Cincinnati Bengals	W 26–23 (OT)	Giants Stadium	3–0	CBS	Recap
4	Bye week							
5	October 5	1:00 P.M.	Seattle Seahawks	W 44–6	Giants Stadium	4–0	Fox	Recap
6	October 13	8:30 P.M.	at Cleveland Browns	L 14–35	Cleveland Browns Stadium	4–1	ESPN	Recap
7	October 19	1:00 P.M.	San Francisco 49ers	W 29–17	Giants Stadium	5–1	Fox	Recap
8	October 26	4:15 P.M.	at Pittsburgh Steelers	W 21–14	Heinz Field	6–1	Fox	Recap
9	November 2	4:15 P.M.	Dallas Cowboys	W 35–14	Giants Stadium	7–1	Fox	Recap
10	November 9	8:15 P.M.	at Philadelphia Eagles	W 36–31	Lincoln Financial Field	8–1	NBC	Recap
11	November 16	1:00 P.M.	Baltimore Ravens	W 30–10	Giants Stadium	9–1	CBS	Recap
12	November 23	4:15 P.M.	at Arizona Cardinals	W 37–29	University of Phoenix Stadium	10–1	Fox	Recap
13	November 30	1:00 P.M.	at Washington Redskins	W 23–7	FedExField	11–1	Fox	Recap
14	December 7	1:00 P.M.	Philadelphia Eagles	L 14–20	Giants Stadium	11–2	Fox	Recap
15	December 14	8:15 P.M.	at Dallas Cowboys	L 8–20	Texas Stadium	11–3	NBC	Recap
16	December 21	8:15 P.M.	Carolina Panthers	W 34–28 (OT)	Giants Stadium	12–3	NBC	Recap
17	December 28	1:00 P.M.	at Minnesota Vikings	L 19–20	Hubert H. Humphrey Metrodome	12–4	Fox	Recap

=== Standings ===
NFC East
	W	L	T	PCT	DIV	CONF	PF	PA	STK
^{(1)} New York Giants	12	4	0	.750	4–2	9–3	427	294	L1
^{(6)} Philadelphia Eagles	9	6	1	.594	2–4	7–5	416	289	W1
Dallas Cowboys	9	7	0	.563	3–3	7–5	362	365	L2
Washington Redskins	8	8	0	.500	3–3	7–5	265	296	L1

=== Week 1: vs. Washington Redskins ===
NFL Kickoff game

Quarter	1	2	3	4	Total
Redskins	0	7	0	0	7
Giants	10	6	0	0	16

at Giants Stadium, East Rutherford, New Jersey

- Game time: 7:00 pm EDT
- Game weather: 85 °F (29 °C), Cloudy & Humid
- Game attendance: 79,742
- Referee: Ed Hochuli
- TV announcers (NBC): Al Michaels, John Madden, & Andrea Kremer

With their Super Bowl championship title to defend, the Giants began their season in the annual kickoff game against their NFC East rivals, the Washington Redskins. In the first quarter, New York got off to a fast start as Super Bowl XLII MVP quarterback Eli Manning capped off the game's opening drive with a 1-yard touchdown run. Later in the quarter, kicker John Carney managed to get a 24-yard field goal. In the second quarter, the Giants increased their lead with Carney nailing a 25-yard and a 47-yard field goal. Near the end of the half, the Redskins managed to get on the board as quarterback Jason Campbell completed a 12-yard touchdown pass to wide receiver Santana Moss. New York's defense stiffened in the second half and allowed them to hold on for the victory.

With the win, not only did the Giants begin their season at 1–0, they also became the 9th-straight defending Super Bowl champion to win their season opener.

=== Week 2: at St. Louis Rams ===
Quarter	1	2	3	4	Total
Giants	7	6	7	21	41
Rams	0	6	0	7	13

at Edward Jones Dome, St. Louis, Missouri

- Game time: 1:00 pm EDT
- Game weather: None (Domed Stadium)
- Game attendance: 61,377
- Referee: Bill Leavy
- TV announcers (Fox): Joe Buck, Troy Aikman, & Pam Oliver

Coming off their divisional home win over the Redskins, the Giants flew to the Edward Jones Dome for a Week 2 duel with the St. Louis Rams. In the first quarter, the Giants drew first blood with quarterback Eli Manning completing a 33-yard touchdown pass to wide receiver Plaxico Burress. In the second quarter, the teams traded 2 field goals, and the Giants led 13–7 at halftime.

In the third quarter, New York increased its lead with Manning completing a 10-yard touchdown pass to wide receiver Amani Toomer. In the fourth quarter, the Rams tried to rally as quarterback Marc Bulger completed a 45-yard touchdown pass to wide receiver Torry Holt. Afterwards, the Giants pulled away with Manning's 18-yard touchdown pass to running back Ahmad Bradshaw, defensive end Justin Tuck's 41-yard interception return for a touchdown, and Bradshaw's 31-yard touchdown run.

With the win, not only did the Giants improve to 2–0, but they also picked up their 12th consecutive road win.

=== Week 3: vs. Cincinnati Bengals ===
Quarter	1	2	3	4	OT	Total
Bengals	3	10	0	10	0	23
Giants	0	10	3	10	3	26

at Giants Stadium, East Rutherford, New Jersey

- Game time: 1:00 pm EST
- Game weather: 76 °F (24 °C), Sunny
- Game attendance: 79,276
- Referee: Jeff Triplette
- TV announcers (CBS): Greg Gumbel & Dan Dierdorf

Coming off their road win over the Rams, the Giants went home for a Week 3 interconference duel with the Cincinnati Bengals. In the first quarter, the Giants trailed early as Bengals kicker Shayne Graham kicked a 22-yard field goal. In the second quarter, New York responded with running back Brandon Jacobs getting a 1-yard touchdown run. Cincinnati replied with running back Chris Perry getting a 25-yard touchdown run, yet the Giants managed to tie the game with kicker John Carney getting a 24-yard field goal. The Bengals ended the first half with Graham's 30-yard field goal.

In the third quarter, Big Blue responded with Carney's 46-yard field goal. In the fourth quarter, the Giants took the lead with Carney kicking a 26-yard field goal. Cincinnati took the lead again with quarterback Carson Palmer completing a 17-yard touchdown pass to wide receiver T.J. Houshmandzadeh. New York reclaimed the lead with quarterback Eli Manning completing a 4-yard touchdown pass to tight end Kevin Boss on 3rd and goal, yet the Bengals tied the game with Graham's 21-yard field goal as time expired. In overtime, after exchanging punts, Manning led the Giants on a 6 play, 66-yard game winning drive, with Carney kicking a 22-yard field goal.

With the win, the Giants entered the bye week at 3–0.

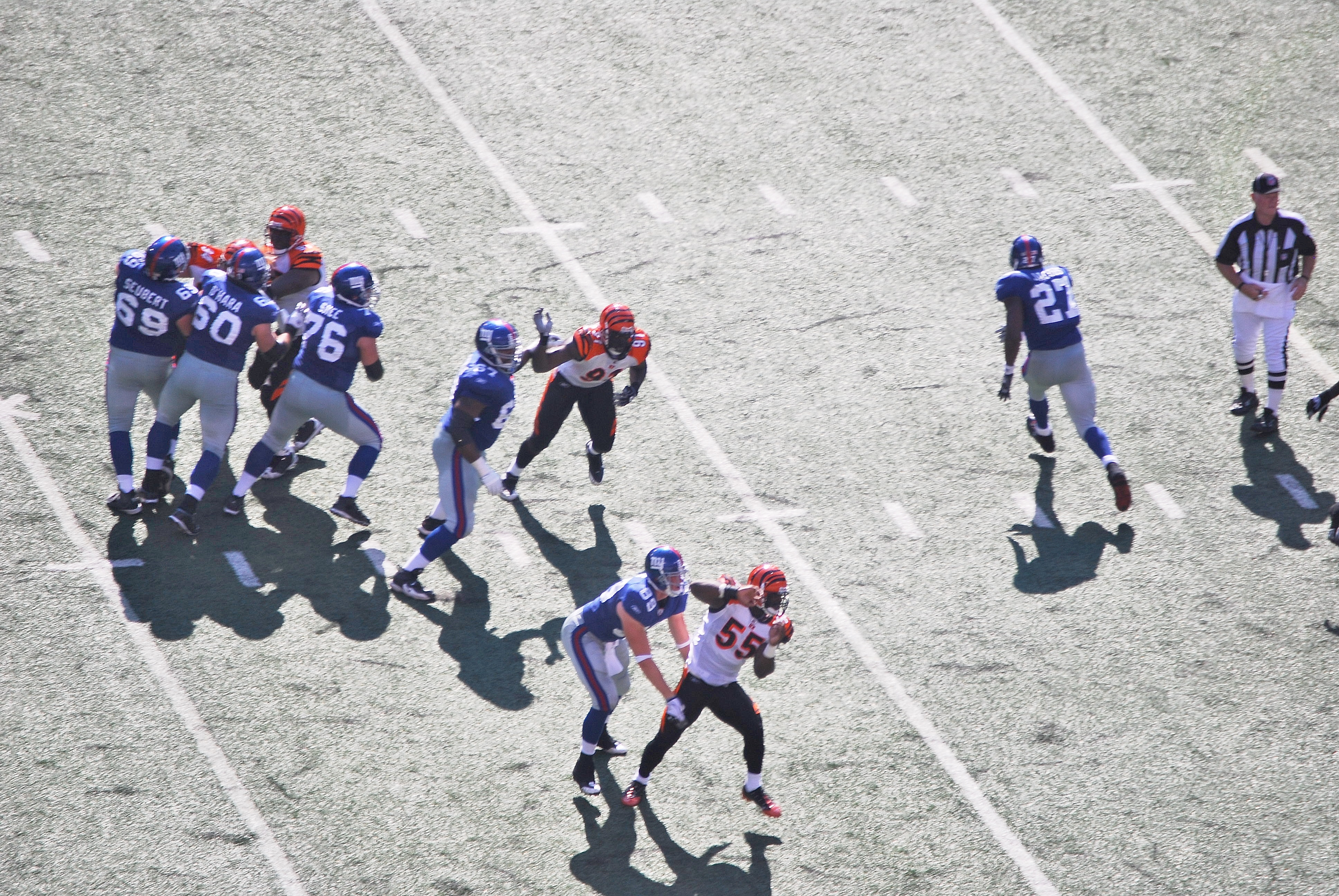
New York on offense in week 3

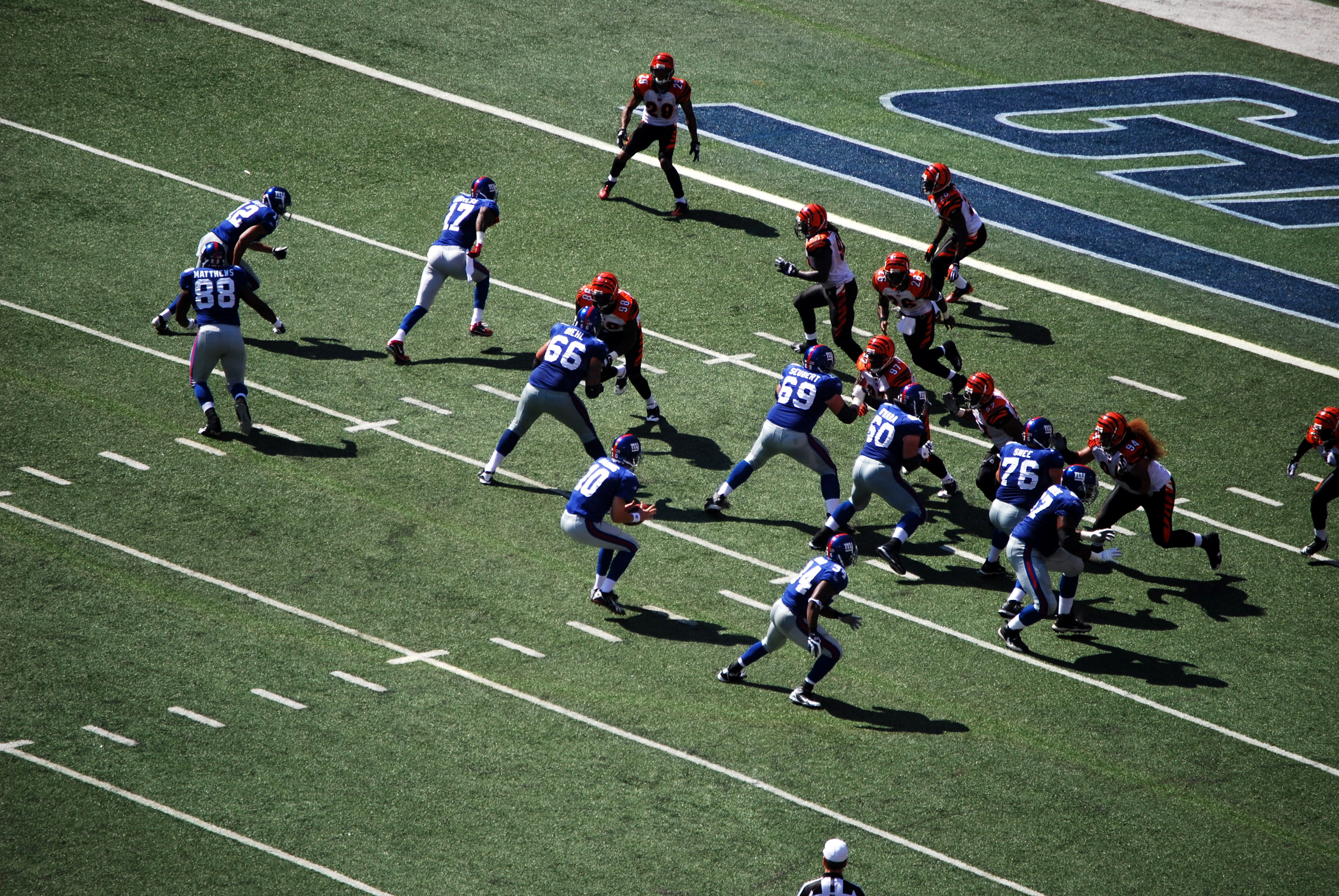
Eli Manning in the shotgun

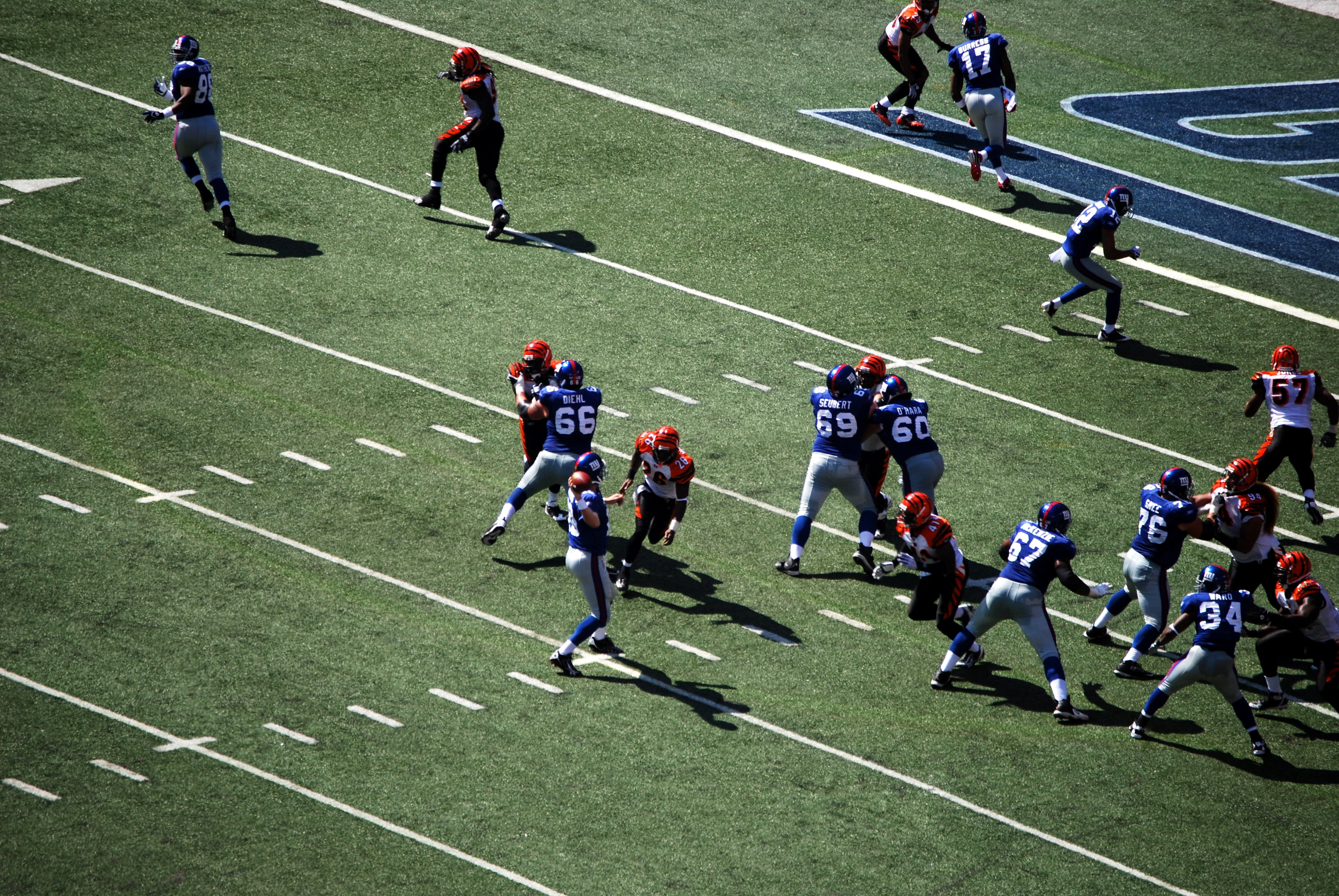
Manning passing against Cincinnati

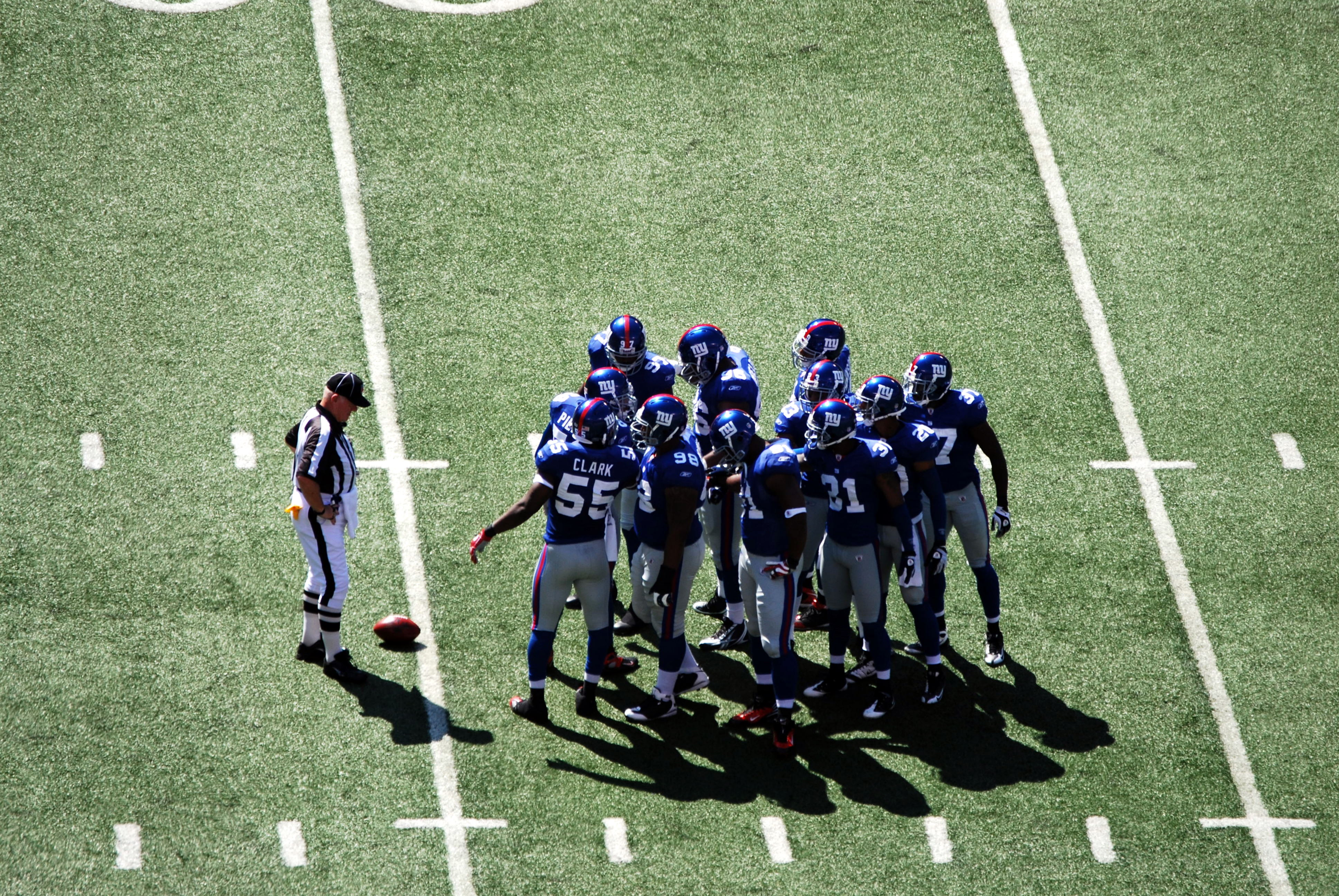
New York huddle against Cincinnati

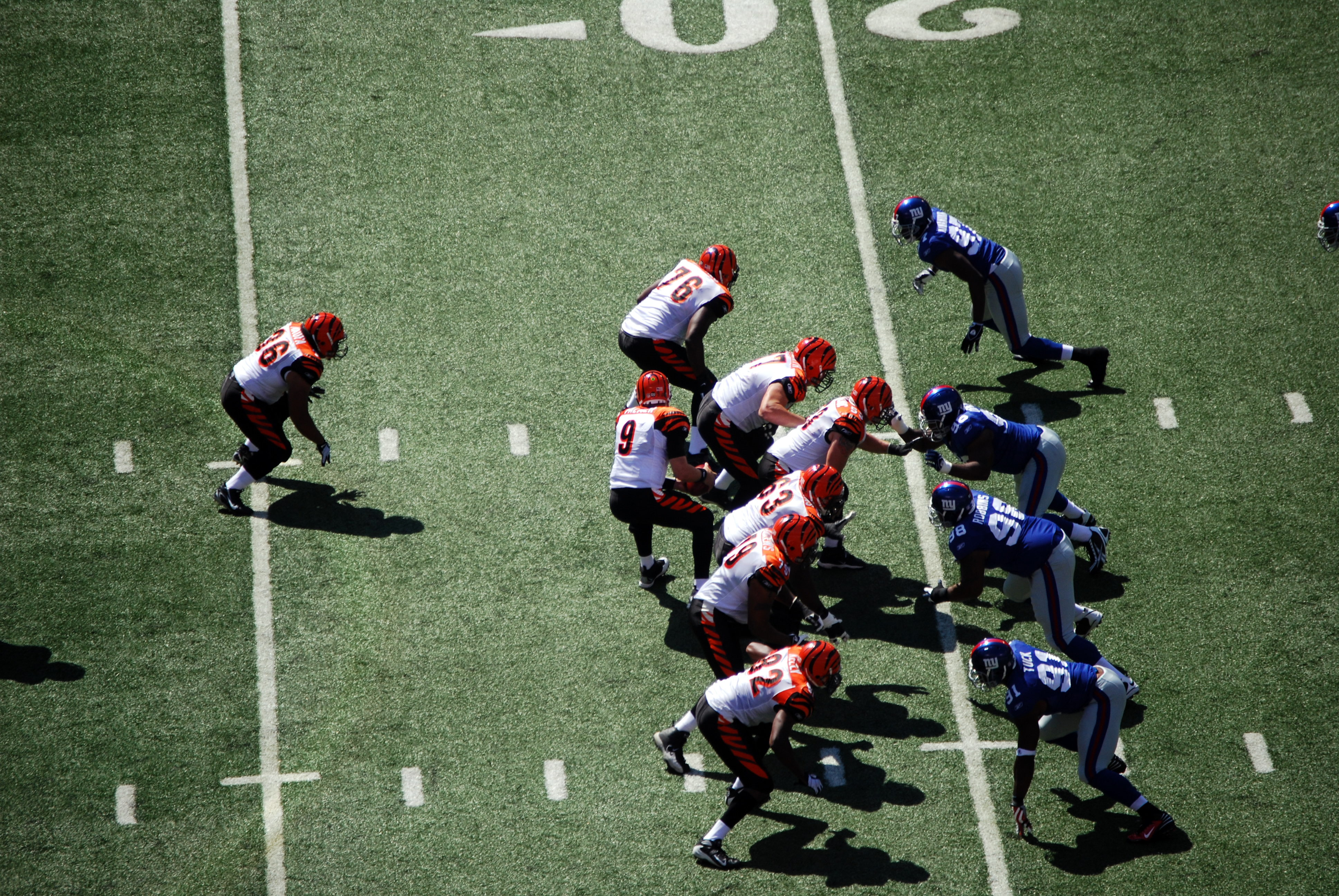
The Bengals on offense at New York

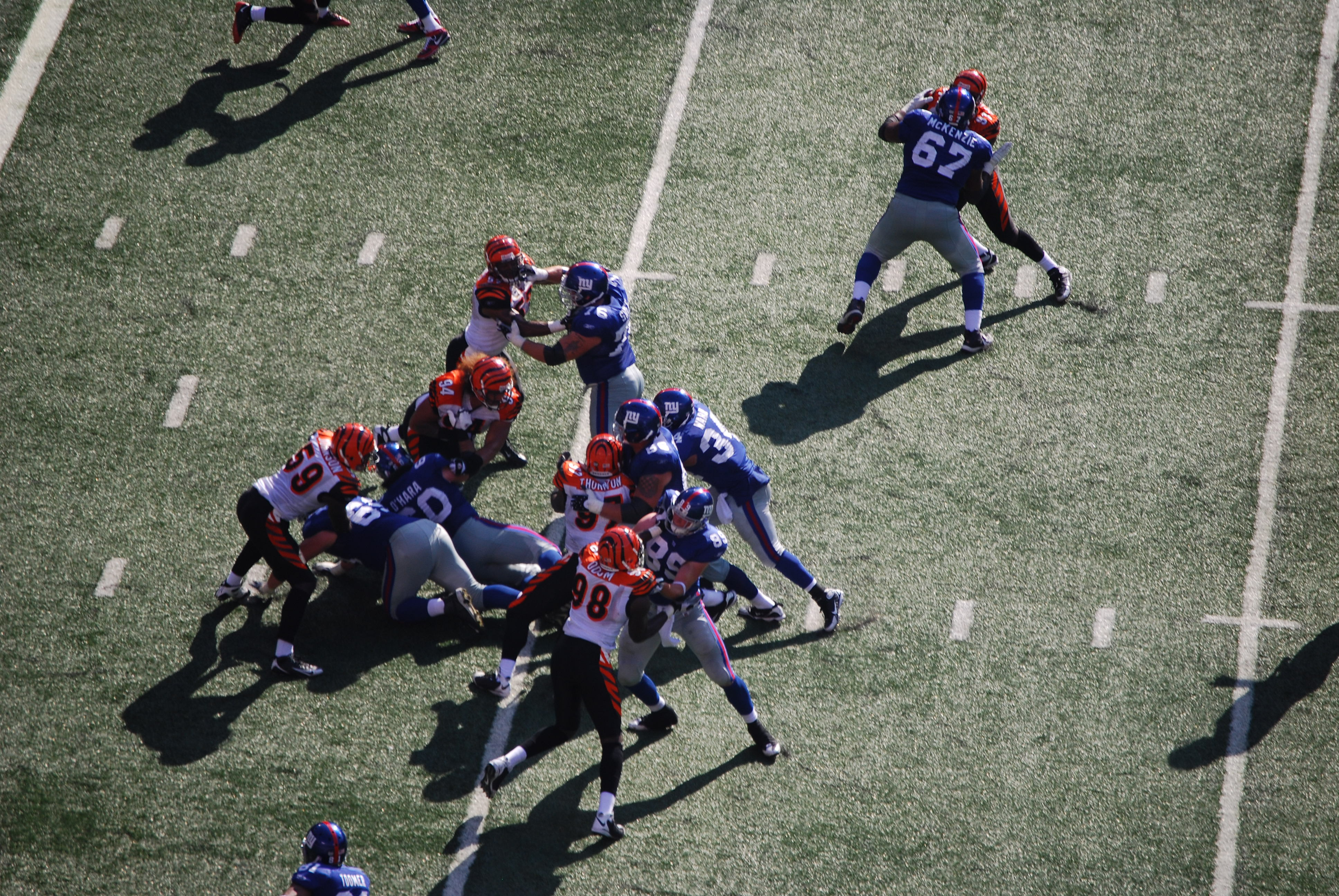
The Giants offensive line

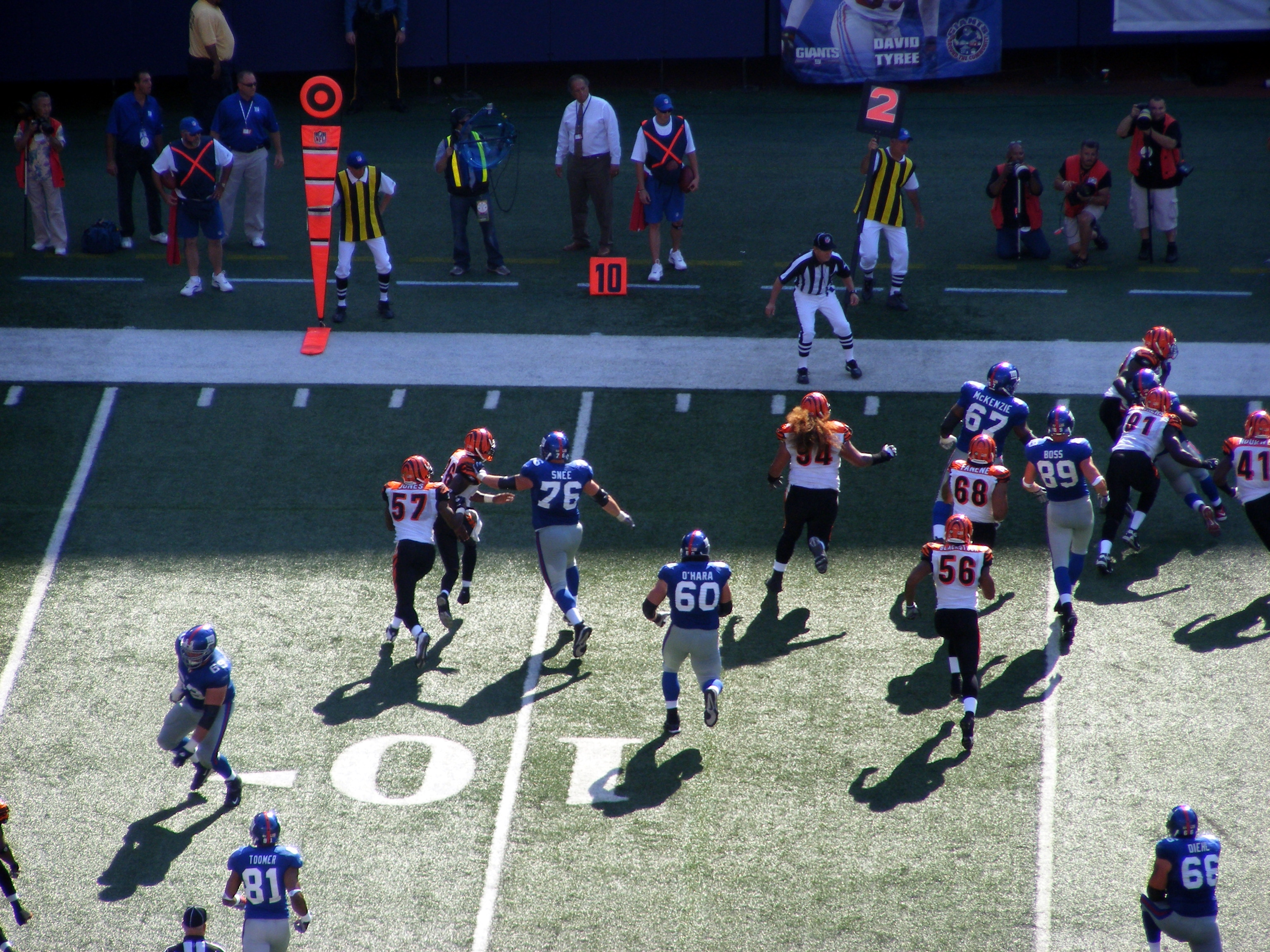
A New York 2nd down play

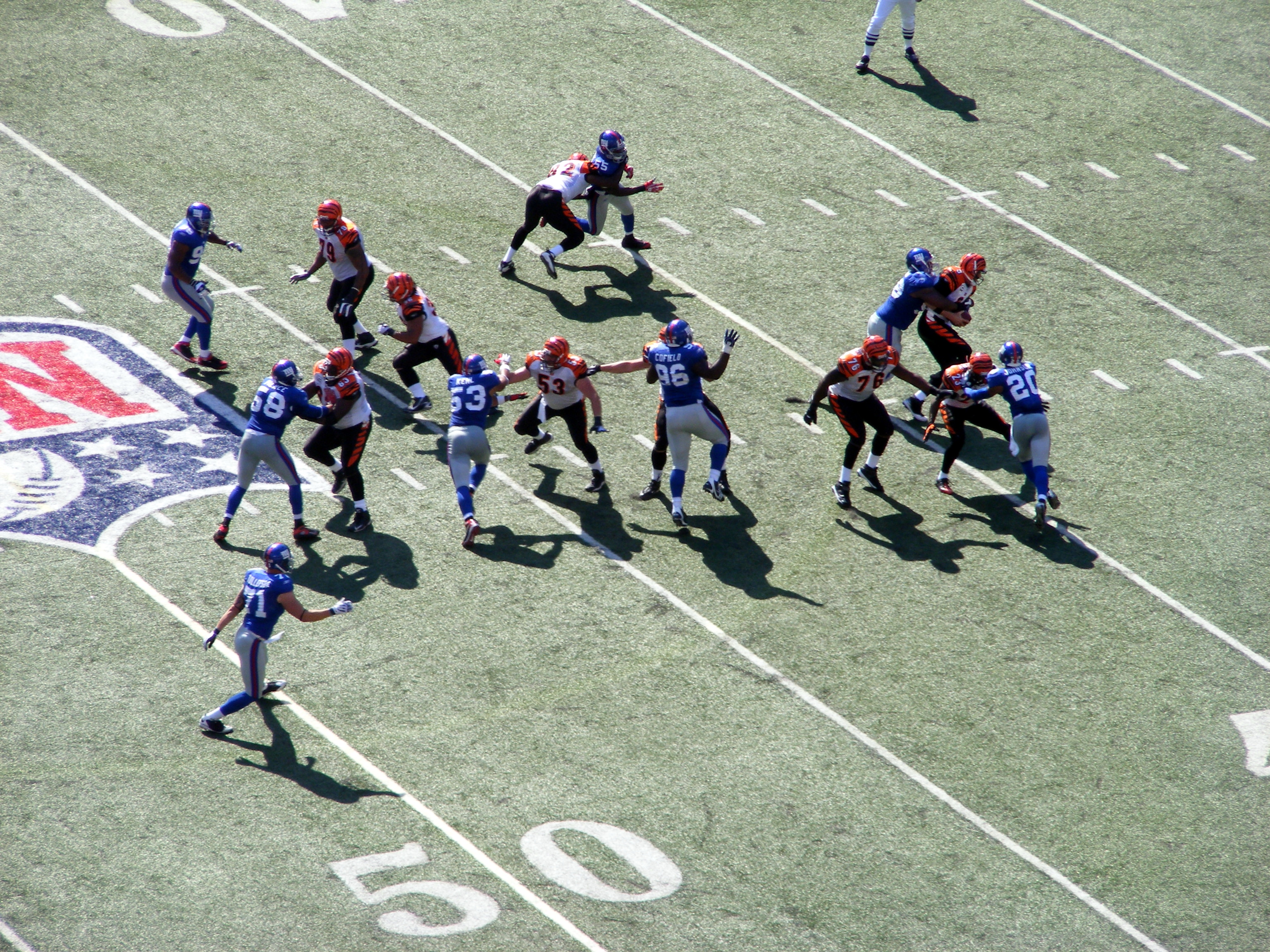
Carson Palmer is sacked

=== Week 5: vs. Seattle Seahawks ===
Quarter	1	2	3	4	Total
Seahawks	3	3	0	0	6
Giants	14	13	10	7	44

at Giants Stadium, East Rutherford, New Jersey

- Game time: 1:00 pm EST
- Game weather: 60 °F (16 °C), Cloudy
- Game attendance: 79,529
- Referee: Alberto Riveron
- TV announcers (Fox): Kenny Albert, Daryl Johnston, and Tony Siragusa

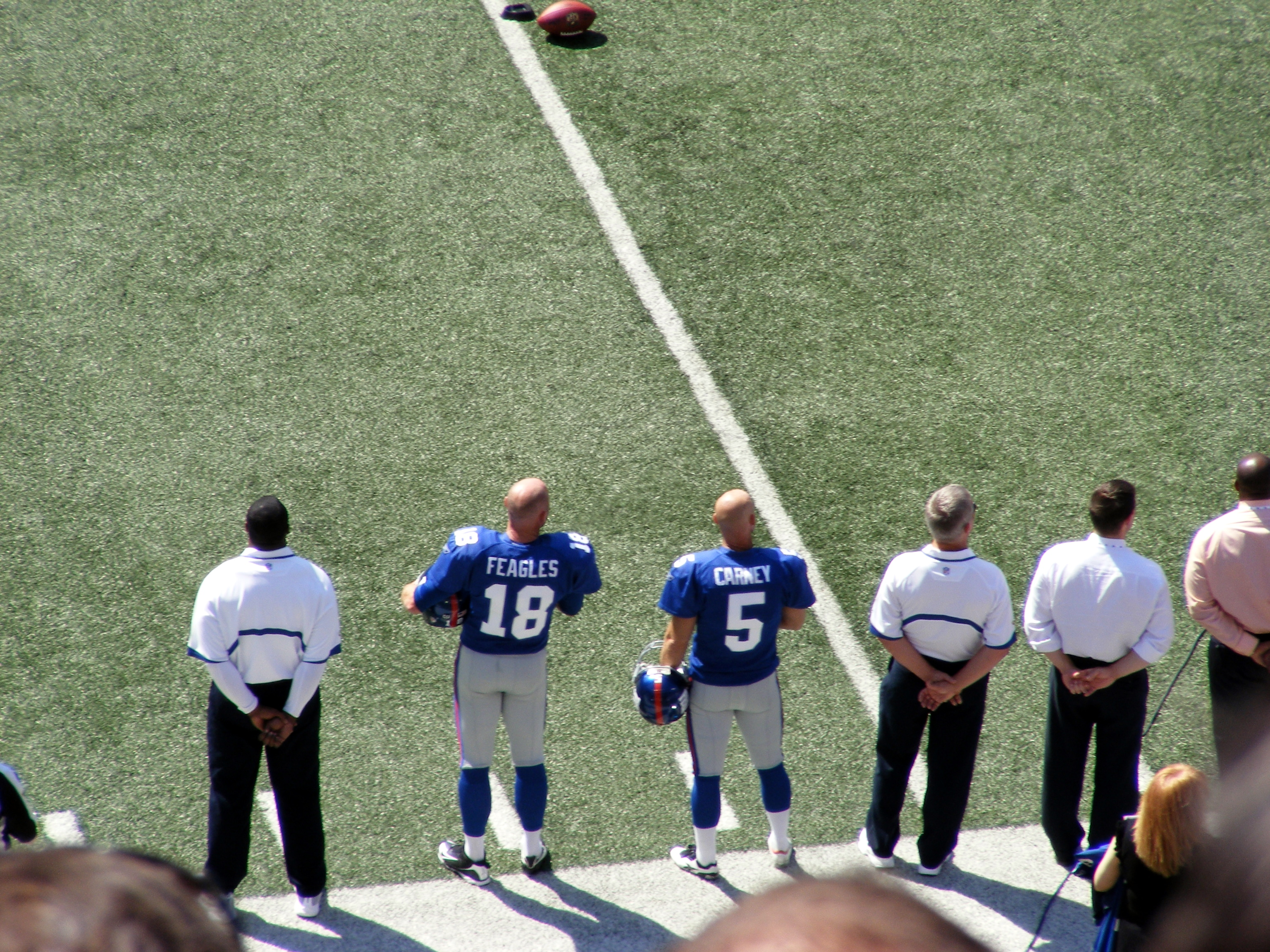
Jeff Feagles and John Carney on the Giants sideline during the Cincinnati game in week 3

Coming off their bye week, the Giants stayed at home for a Week 5 duel with the Seattle Seahawks. The game was notable for the fact that wide receiver Plaxico Burress was suspended for this game, due to a minor internal conflict.

In the first quarter, the Giants drew first blood as quarterback Eli Manning completed a 32-yard touchdown to wide receiver Domenik Hixon. The Seahawks responded with kicker Olindo Mare getting a 30-yard field goal. Afterwards, New York increased its lead with running back Brandon Jacobs getting a 3-yard touchdown run. In the second quarter, the Giants continued its run with kicker John Carney getting a 29-yard field goal, Jacobs getting a 1-yard touchdown run, and Carney kicking a 33-yard field goal. Seattle closed the half with Mare making a 29-yard field goal.

In the third quarter, the Giants continued their victory march as Manning completed a 23-yard touchdown pass to wide receiver Sinorice Moss, along with Carney nailing a 35-yard field goal. In the fourth quarter, New York completed its domination as backup quarterback David Carr completed a 5-yard touchdown pass to Moss.

The Giants racked up 523 yards in total offense, their most since collecting 524 yards against Green Bay on January 6, 2002, and limited Seattle to 187.

With their eighth-straight win, the Giants acquired their first 4–0 start since the franchise's Super Bowl XXV championship run of 1990.

The 38-point differential win marked New York's largest regular-season margin of victory since 1972. The Giants also led the NFL in point differential with +78 in four games. The second best point differential belonged to the Tennessee Titans, with +59, in five games.

=== Week 6: at Cleveland Browns ===
Quarter	1	2	3	4	Total
Giants	0	14	0	0	14
Browns	3	14	3	15	35

at Cleveland Browns Stadium, Cleveland, Ohio

- Game time: 8:15 pm EDT
- Game weather: 71 °F (22 °C), Clear Skies
- Game attendance: 73,102
- Referee: John Parry
- TV announcers (ESPN): Mike Tirico, Ron Jaworski, Tony Kornheiser, Michele Tafoya, & Suzy Kolber

Coming off their dominating home win over the Seahawks, the Giants flew to Cleveland Browns Stadium for a Week 6 interconference duel with the Cleveland Browns on Monday Night Football. Also the first time Tom Coughlin returned to Cleveland since the 2001 Bottlegate incident.

In the first quarter, New York trailed early as Browns kicker Phil Dawson got a 28-yard field goal. In the second quarter, the Giants took the lead as running back Brandon Jacobs got a 7-yard touchdown run. Cleveland regained the lead as running back Jamal Lewis got a 4-yard touchdown run, along with quarterback Derek Anderson completing a 22-yard touchdown pass to tight end Darnell Dinkins. The Giants closed out the half with quarterback Eli Manning completing a 3-yard touchdown pass to wide receiver Plaxico Burress.

In the third quarter, the Browns added on to their lead as Dawson nailed a 26-yard field goal. In the fourth quarter, Cleveland pulled away as Anderson completed an 11-yard touchdown pass to wide receiver Braylon Edwards and cornerback Eric Wright returned an interception 94 yards for a touchdown.

With the loss, not only did the Giants fall to 4–1, but their 12-game road winning streak was snapped.

=== Week 7: vs. San Francisco 49ers ===
Quarter	1	2	3	4	Total
49ers	3	7	7	0	17
Giants	7	10	7	5	29

at Giants Stadium, East Rutherford, New Jersey

- Game time: 1:00 pm EST/10:00 am PST
- Game weather: 51 °F (11 °C), Sunny
- Game attendance: 78,676
- Referee: Walt Anderson
- TV announcers (Fox): Dick Stockton, Troy Aikman, & Pam Oliver

Hoping to rebound from their Monday Night road loss to the Browns, the Giants went home for a Week 7 duel with the San Francisco 49ers. In the first quarter, New York drew first blood as running back Brandon Jacobs got a 26-yard touchdown run. The 49ers responded with kicker Joe Nedney getting a 40-yard field goal. In the second quarter, the Giants increased their lead as Jacobs got a 2-yard touchdown run. San Francisco answered with quarterback J.T. O'Sullivan completing a 30-yard touchdown pass to wide receiver Josh Morgan. The Giants would close out the half with kicker John Carney getting a 21-yard field goal.

In the third quarter, New York added onto their lead as quarterback Eli Manning completed a 6-yard touchdown pass to wide receiver Plaxico Burress. The 49ers would reply as cornerback Nate Clements returned a blocked field goal 74 yards for a touchdown. In the fourth quarter, the Giants pulled away as Carney nailed a 48-yard field goal, along with defensive end Justin Tuck forcing an O'Sulivan fumble that would roll towards the 49ers' endzone, causing Morgan to kick the ball out of the back of the endzone, giving New York a safety.

With the win, the Giants improved to 5–1.

=== Week 8: at Pittsburgh Steelers ===
Quarter	1	2	3	4	Total
Giants	3	6	0	12	21
Steelers	7	0	7	0	14

at Heinz Field, Pittsburgh, Pennsylvania

- Game time: 4:15 pm EDT
- Game weather: 62 °F (17 °C), Sunny
- Game attendance: 64,991
- Referee: Bill Carollo
- TV announcers (Fox): Dick Stockton, Troy Aikman, & Pam Oliver

Coming off their home win over the 49ers, the Giants flew to Heinz Field for a Week 8 interconference duel with the Pittsburgh Steelers. In the first quarter, New York trailed early as Steelers running back Mewelde Moore got a 32-yard touchdown run. The Giants would respond with kicker John Carney getting a 26-yard field goal. In the second quarter, the Giants took the lead as Carney got a 35-yard and a 25-yard field goal.

In the third quarter, Pittsburgh regained the lead with quarterback Ben Roethlisberger completing a 65-yard touchdown pass to wide receiver Nate Washington. In the fourth quarter, New York pulled within two points as Carney nailed a 24-yard field goal. Afterwards, the Giants tied the game as linebacker James Harrison (who took over the Steelers' long snapper position after their normal long snapper Greg Warren was injured during the game) accidentally snapped the ball high over punter Mitch Berger and it rolled into the back of the endzone for a safety. Afterwards, New York finished its rally as quarterback Eli Manning completed a 2-yard touchdown pass to tight end Kevin Boss.

With the win, the Giants improved to 6–1.

=== Week 9: vs. Dallas Cowboys ===
Quarter	1	2	3	4	Total
Cowboys	0	7	0	7	14
Giants	14	7	7	7	35

at Giants Stadium, East Rutherford, New Jersey

- Game time: 4:15 pm EDT
- Game weather: 48 °F (9 °C), Partly Cloudy
- Game attendance: 78,826
- Referee: Jerome Boger
- TV announcers (Fox): Joe Buck, Troy Aikman, & Pam Oliver

Coming off their huge road win over the Steelers, the Giants went home for a Week 9 NFC East duel against the rival Dallas Cowboys. In the first quarter, the Giants drew first blood as quarterback Eli Manning completed a 13-yard touchdown pass to tight end Kevin Boss and a 5-yard touchdown pass to wide receiver Steve Smith. In the second quarter, the Cowboys responded with cornerback Mike Jenkins returning an interception 23 yards for a touchdown. New York would end the half with Manning completing an 11-yard touchdown pass to wide receiver Amani Toomer.

In the third quarter, the Giants increased their lead as running back Brandon Jacobs got a 12-yard touchdown run. In the fourth quarter, Dallas tried to rally as quarterback Brooks Bollinger completed an 8-yard touchdown pass to wide receiver Terrell Owens. Afterwards, New York pulled away as running back Derrick Ward got a 17-yard touchdown run.

With the win, the Giants improved to 7–1.

=== Week 10: at Philadelphia Eagles ===
Quarter	1	2	3	4	Total
Giants	10	10	7	9	36
Eagles	7	10	7	7	31

at Lincoln Financial Field, Philadelphia, Pennsylvania

- Game time: 8:15 pm EDT
- Game weather: 48 °F (9 °C), Clear
- Game attendance: 69,144
- Referee: Terry McAulay
- TV announcers (NBC): Al Michaels, John Madden and Andrea Kremer

Coming off their home win over the Cowboys, the Giants flew to Lincoln Financial Field for a Week 10 NFC East duel with the Philadelphia Eagles on Sunday Night Football. In the first quarter, New York trailed early as Eagles wide receiver DeSean Jackson got a 9-yard touchdown run. The Giants responded with quarterback Eli Manning completing a 17-yard touchdown pass to wide receiver Plaxico Burress, along with kicker John Carney getting a 27-yard field goal. In the second quarter, the Giants increased their lead as Manning completed a 1-yard touchdown pass to tight end Kevin Boss. Philadelphia responded with quarterback Donovan McNabb completing a 10-yard touchdown pass to wide receiver Jason Avant. New York answered right back as Carney got a 26-yard field goal. The Eagles would close out the half as kicker David Akers got a 29-yard field goal.

In the third quarter, Philadelphia took the lead as McNabb completed a 7-yard touchdown pass to wide receiver Hank Baskett. The Giants replied with running back Brandon Jacobs getting a 3-yard touchdown run. New York increased their lead as Carney nailed a 28-yard field goal, along with Jacobs getting another 3-yard touchdown run (with a failed 2-point conversion). The Eagles tried to come back as McNabb completed a 2-yard touchdown pass to wide receiver Kevin Curtis. Big Blue's defense managed to prevent any possible comeback, preserving the lead.

With the win, the Giants improved to 8–1.

=== Week 11: vs. Baltimore Ravens ===
Quarter	1	2	3	4	Total
Ravens	0	3	7	0	10
Giants	13	7	7	3	30

at Giants Stadium, East Rutherford, New Jersey

- Game time: 1:00 pm EDT
- Game weather: 49 °F (9 °C), Cloudy
- Game attendance: 78,849
- Referee: Ron Winter
- TV announcers (CBS): Greg Gumbel & Dan Dierdorf

Coming off their divisional road win over the Eagles, the Giants went home for a Week 11 interconference duel with the Baltimore Ravens. In the first quarter, the Giants drew first blood as running back Brandon Jacobs got two 1-yard touchdown runs (with a failed extra point on the latter). In the second quarter, New York increased their lead as quarterback Eli Manning completed a 1-yard touchdown pass to tight end Darcy Johnson. The Ravens would respond with kicker Matt Stover getting a 38-yard field goal.

In the third quarter, Baltimore tried to rally as quarterback Joe Flacco completed a 10-yard touchdown pass to fullback Le'Ron McClain. The Giants would answer with cornerback Aaron Ross returning an interception 50 yards for a touchdown. In the fourth quarter, New York pulled away as kicker Lawrence Tynes nailed a 19-yard field goal.

With the win, the Giants improved to 9–1.

=== Week 12: at Arizona Cardinals ===
Quarter	1	2	3	4	Total
Giants	0	17	7	13	37
Cardinals	3	9	7	10	29

at University of Phoenix Stadium, Glendale, Arizona

- Game time: 4:15 pm EDT
- Game weather: None (Dome Closed)
- Game attendance: 64,541
- Referee: Peter Morelli
- TV announcers (Fox): Kenny Albert, Daryl Johnston & Tony Siragusa

Coming off their home win over the Ravens, the Giants flew to the University of Phoenix Stadium for a Week 12 duel with the Arizona Cardinals. In the first quarter, New York trailed early as Cardinals kicker Neil Rackers got a 34-yard field goal. In the second quarter, the Giants responded with running back Derrick Ward getting a 1-yard touchdown run. Arizona would answer with running back Tim Hightower getting a 4-yard touchdown run (with a failed extra-point attempt). New York replied with kicker John Carney getting a 33-yard field goal, yet the Cardinals got the lead again as Rackers made a 20-yard field goal. The Giants would regain the lead prior to halftime as quarterback Eli Manning completed a 12-yard touchdown pass to wide receiver Amani Toomer.

In the third quarter, the Giants increased their lead as Manning completed a 2-yard TD pass to FB Madison Hedgecock. Arizona would answer with Hightower's 1-yard touchdown run. In the fourth quarter, New York greatly increased their lead as Manning completed a 10-yard touchdown pass to tight end Kevin Boss. Following an interception by Terrell Thomas, John Carney got a 27-yard field goal. Arizona would respond with quarterback Kurt Warner completing a 5-yard touchdown pass to wide receiver Anquan Boldin, yet the Giants answered with Carney getting a 33-yard field goal. The Cardinals tried to come back as Rackers nailed a 44-yard field goal. Fortunately, New York recovered the following onside kick and prevailed.

With the win, the Giants improved to 10–1.

==== Plaxico Burress shooting ====
On Friday, November 28, 2008, Giants wide receiver Plaxico Burress suffered an accidental self-inflicted gunshot wound to the right thigh in a New York City nightclub when his gun, tucked in the waistband of his sweatpants, began sliding down his leg. The injury was not life-threatening and he was released from an area hospital the next afternoon. The following Monday, Burress turned himself in to police to face charges of criminal possession of a handgun. Burress had an expired concealed carry (CCW) license from Florida, but no New York license.

On December 2, 2008, Burress posted bail of $100,000. He was scheduled to return to court on March 31, 2009, to enter a plea. Later in the day, Burress reported to Giants Stadium as per team policy for injured but active players, and was told he would be suspended without pay.

Burress would later be released by the Giants on April 3, 2009.

=== Week 13: vs. Washington Redskins ===
Quarter	1	2	3	4	Total
Giants	10	3	7	3	23
Redskins	0	7	0	0	7

at FedExField, Landover, Maryland

- Game time: 1:00 pm EDT
- Game weather: 40 °F (4 °C), Rainy
- Game attendance: 85,912
- Referee: Tony Corrente
- TV announcers (Fox): Kenny Albert, Daryl Johnston & Tony Siragusa

Coming off their road win over the Cardinals, the Giants flew to FedExField for a Week 13 NFC East rematch with the Washington Redskins. In the first quarter, New York scored first as quarterback Eli Manning completed a 40-yard touchdown pass to wide receiver Amani Toomer, along with kicker John Carney getting a 31-yard field goal. In the second quarter, the Giants increased their lead as Carney got a 38-yard field goal. The Redskins would close out the half with wide receiver Devin Thomas getting a 29-yard touchdown run.

In the third quarter, New York began to pull away as running back Brandon Jacobs got a 1-yard touchdown run. In the fourth quarter, the Giants sealed the deal with Carney connecting on a 39-yard field goal.

With the season-sweep, the Giants improved to 11–1, exceeding the 1986 and 1990 teams (both started 10–2 and eventually won the Super Bowl) for the best 12-game record in franchise history.

=== Week 14: vs. Philadelphia Eagles ===
Quarter	1	2	3	4	Total
Eagles	3	7	7	3	20
Giants	0	7	0	7	14

at Giants Stadium, East Rutherford, New Jersey

- Game time: 1:00 pm EDT
- Game weather: 35 °F (2 °C), Mostly Cloudy
- Game attendance: 79,003
- Referee: Gene Steratore
- TV announcers (Fox): Kenny Albert, Daryl Johnston, & Tony Siragusa

Philadelphia would score first in the game with a 51-yard David Akers field goal. Then in the second quarter, the Eagles Brian Westbrook scored on a 30-yard touchdown run that gave Philadelphia a 10–0 lead. With 7 seconds left in the 1st half, the Eagles attempted to go up 13–0 with a field goal, instead, the kick was blocked and returned 71 yards by Kevin Dockery for a Giants touchdown. That cut the lead to 10–7.

Early in the third quarter, Donovan McNabb found Brian Westbrook for a 40-yard Eagles touchdown that increased their lead to 17–7. Philadelphia would score again in the 3rd with a 34-yard field goal by David Akers. The Giants would score on a 1-yard pass from Eli Manning to Darcy Johnson with 20 seconds left in the game, but couldn't recover an onside kick and the Eagles won the game.

Despite falling to 11–2, the Giants clinched the NFC East title when the Dallas Cowboys lost to the Pittsburgh Steelers 20–13.

=== Week 15: at Dallas Cowboys ===
Quarter	1	2	3	4	Total
Giants	0	3	0	5	8
Cowboys	0	7	0	13	20

at Texas Stadium, Irving, Texas

- Game time: 8:15 pm EDT
- Game weather: 71 °F (22 °C)
- Game attendance: 63,776
- Referee: Walt Anderson
- TV announcers (NBC): Al Michaels, John Madden, & Andrea Kremer

The second-to-last NFL game ever to be played at Texas Stadium was a defensive struggle that featured the Giants' weakest offensive showing of the year. Brandon Jacobs was sidelined with a knee injury, crippling New York's running game; Derrick Ward started in his place.

The Cowboys scored first, on a 34-yard touchdown pass from Tony Romo to Patrick Crayton early in the second quarter. The Giants answered with a 34-yard John Carney field goal on the ensuing drive. The next scoring came in the fourth quarter, when Romo threw fullback Deon Anderson his first career touchdown. On the Cowboys' next drive, deep in their own territory, Mathias Kiwanuka sacked Romo and forced a fumble in the end zone, which resulted in a safety. But the Giants could only put up another field goal, and Tashard Choice's 38-yard touchdown run with 2:24 to play sealed the victory for the Cowboys. Eli Manning was sacked a season-high eight times to Romo's four.

The Giants had now lost two consecutive games for the first time since Weeks 1–2 of 2007, and fell to 11–3.

=== Week 16: vs. Carolina Panthers ===
Quarter	1	2	3	4	OT	Total
Panthers	7	14	0	7	0	28
Giants	3	10	7	8	6	34

at Giants Stadium, East Rutherford, New Jersey

- Game time: 8:15 pm EDT
- Game weather: 34 °F (1 °C), Clear
- Game attendance: 78,653
- Referee: Walt Coleman
- TV announcers (NBC): Al Michaels, John Madden, & Andrea Kremer

The Giants snapped their two-game losing streak and clinched home field advantage throughout the NFC playoffs by defeating the Panthers. With the loss Carolina failed to clinch the NFC South. The Giants had already clinched a first round bye by virtue of Minnesota's loss to Atlanta earlier in the day.

New York won the toss and scored on their opening drive on a 32-yard John Carney field goal. Carolina responded by scoring a touchdown on their first drive, a thirteen-yard run by DeAngelo Williams.

The Giants scored on their second drive as well, going 74 yards in 13 plays and ending with a Brandon Jacobs touchdown from the Carolina 2. The Panthers responded with another Williams touchdown run, this time five yards, and a 14–10 lead. After forcing the Giants to punt Carolina scored again, as Williams scored his third touchdown of the game on a one-yard run. The drive went four plays for 65 yards, 60 of which came on a deep pass from Jake Delhomme to Muhsin Muhammad. Williams' touchdown came two plays after Steve Smith appeared to have scored on a short pass, but a replay challenge was upheld.

After the teams traded punts the Giants scored with 0:55 remaining in the half as Carney added his second field goal of the game. Then on their second drive of the second half, Eli Manning threw a short touchdown to Kevin Boss to cut the deficit to 21–20 with 1:07 remaining in the third quarter. Carolina scored on their very next drive, with Williams scoring for the fourth time on a thirty-yard run.

New York tied the game with 3:24 remaining as Jacobs scored on a one-yard touchdown run, after starting the drive in Panther territory. The Giants converted the two-point conversion on a pass from Manning to Domenik Hixon. Carolina then drove down the field and faced fourth and five from the Giants 32-yard line, but John Kasay missed the potential game-winning field goal from 50 yards out.

On their second possession of the overtime period the Giants started at their own 13-yard line. On the first play of the drive Derrick Ward ran for 51 yards and pushed the ball into Carolina territory. Ward added a fourteen-yard run two plays later and a seventeen-yard run the play following that, pushing his rushing total to 215 yards (a career-high) and leaving the Giants two yards from the endzone. On the next play Jacobs scored on a run, his third score of the game, and New York won the game.

The Giants rushed for 301 yards in the game compared to 158 for the Panthers. Jacobs added 87 yards to Ward's 215. Williams rushed for 108 yards on 24 carries, including his four touchdowns. Delhomme finished 11–19 for 185 yards and Manning 17–27 for 181 and a touchdown.

Ward's 14.3-yard rushing average was a single game Giants record. Manning became the first Giants quarterback to throw at least 3,000 passing yards in a season for four consecutive seasons.

While the gametime temperature was 34°, the wind chill being -28 made the game feel like it was only 6° at kickoff. Both teams emphasized their running games, 7 of the 8 touchdowns scored were on the ground.

=== Week 17: at Minnesota Vikings ===
Quarter	1	2	3	4	Total
Giants	0	9	7	3	19
Vikings	0	10	0	10	20

at Hubert H. Humphrey Metrodome, Minneapolis, Minnesota

- Game time: 1:00 pm EDT
- Game weather: None (Domed Stadium)
- Game attendance: 63,761
- Referee: Terry McAulay
- TV announcers (Fox): Dick Stockton, Brian Baldinger, and Laura Okmin

The Giants lost their final game of the 2008 regular season in Minneapolis, their first loss to the Vikings in the Metrodome since the 2001 season. Minnesota clinched the NFC North division crown with the win. New York rested most of their starters in the second half and Brandon Jacobs, Kevin Boss, Aaron Ross, and Barry Cofield were held out of the game due to injuries.

After a scoreless first quarter the Vikings jumped out to a 10–0 lead early in the second quarter, with a Ryan Longwell field goal and a 67-yard touchdown run by Adrian Peterson coming 3:27 apart. Three field goals by John Carney cut the Vikings' lead to 10–9 at the half.

The Giants took their first lead in the third quarter as David Carr hit Domenik Hixon for a 23-yard touchdown pass and extended the lead to nine with 11:25 remaining in the game as Carney added his fourth field goal. Minnesota scored a touchdown on a long pass from Tarvaris Jackson to Bernard Berrian on their next drive, cutting the Giants lead to 19–17. The Giants then had a chance to extend the lead and force Minnesota to score a touchdown to win, but Carney missed from 48 yards with 3:17 to go. Jackson then led the Vikings into field goal range and Longwell hit from 50 yards out to win the game as time expired.

Eli Manning, who started for the Giants but was pulled in the third quarter, led the team with 119 yards passing on 11-for-19, and Carr added 110 yards on 8-for-11. Halfback Derrick Ward rushed for 77 yards on 15 carries, eclipsing 1,000 yards for the season (1,025), joining Jacobs in the 1,000-yard club and making the Giants the fourth team in NFL history (joining the 1971 Dolphins, 1976 Steelers, and 1985 Browns) with two 1,000-yard running backs.

=== Transactions ===
==== September ====
- 1 – Signed defensive end Jerome McDougle
- 1 – Signed defensive tackle Jeremy Clark to practice squad
- 1 – Signed defensive end Wallace Gilberry to practice squad
- 1 – Signed offensive tackle Na'Shan Goddard to practice squad
- 1 – Signed wide receiver Marcus Monk to practice squad
- 1 – Signed cornerback Geoffrey Pope to practice squad
- 1 – Signed offensive guard Kurt Quarterman to practice squad
- 1 – Signed quarterback Andre Woodson to practice squad
- 1 – Signed corerback Rashad Barksdale (Chiefs) to practice squad
- 1 – Placed defensive tackle Rodney Leisle on waivers
- 2 – Placed defensive tackle Rodney Leisle on reserve/injured
- 2 – Signed tight end Eric Butler to practice squad
- 2 – Released cornerback Geoffrey Pope from practice squad
- 8 – Signed wide receiver Taye Biddle (Detroit) to practice squad
- 8 – Released wide receiver Marcus Monk from practice squad
- 11 – Signed defensive tackle Leger Douzable (Vikings) to practice squad
- 11 – Released offensive guard Kurt Quarterman from practice squad
- 23 – Released tight end Eric Butler from practice squad
- 24 – Suspended wide receiver Plaxico Burress for 2 weeks
- 24 – Activated wide receiver Taye Biddle from practice squad
- 24 – Signed wide receiver John Broussard to practice squad

==== October ====
- 7 – Placed wide receiver Taye Biddle on waivers
- 7 – Released John Broussard from practice squad
- 9 – Signed wide receiver Taye Biddle to practice squad
- 21 – Signed offensive tackle Cliff Louis to practice squad
- 21 – Released cornerback Rashad Barksdale from practice squad
- 23 – Signed cornerback Rashad Barksdale to practice squad
- 23 – Released quarterback Andre Woodson from practice squad
- 27 – Signed quarterback Andre Woodson to practice squad
- 27 – Released offensive tackle Cliff Louis from practice squad

==== November ====
- 5 – Signed offensive tackle Cliff Louis to practice squad
- 5 – Released defensive end Wallace Gilberry from practice squad
- 29 – Placed safety Sammy Knight on injured reserve
- 29 – Activated defensive tackle Jeremy Clark from practice squad

==== December ====
- 2 – Signed safety Travonti Johnson to practice squad
- 3 – Suspended wide receiver Plaxico Burress for rest of season
- 3 – Activated defensive tackle Leger Douzable from practice squad
- 3 – Offensive tackle Na'Shan Goddard claimed by Seattle Seahawks
- 3 – Signed offensive guard Mike Fladell to practice squad
- 3 – Signed wide receiver Micah Rucker (Chiefs) to practice squad
- 16 – Placed running back Reuben Droughns on injured reserve
- 16 – Signed wide receiver Derek Hagan (Dolphins)
- 17 – Placed linebacker Jonathan Goff on injured reserve
- 17 – Signed linebacker Edmond Miles (Dolphins)
- 29 – Wide receiver Plaxico Burress's suspension lifted, placed on reserve/injured
- 30 – Placed cornerback Sam Madison on injured reserve
- 30 – Activated cornerback Rashad Barksdale from practice squad
- 30 – Signed linebacker Rich Scanlon
- 30 – Placed linebacker Edmond Miles on waivers
- 31 – Signed wide receiver Paul Raymond (Lions) to practice squad

== Playoffs ==
=== NFC Divisional Round: vs. Philadelphia Eagles ===
Quarter	1	2	3	4	Total
Eagles	7	3	3	10	23
Giants	3	5	3	0	11

at Giants Stadium, East Rutherford, New Jersey

- Game time: 1:00 p.m. EST
- Game weather: 30 °F (−1 °C), Partly Cloudy
- Game attendance: 79,193
- Referee: Mike Carey
- TV announcers (Fox): Joe Buck (play-by-play), Troy Aikman (color commentator), Pam Oliver and Chris Myers (sideline reporters)

Entering the postseason as the NFC's top seed, the Giants began their postseason run at home in the NFC Divisional round against their NFC East rival, the #6 Philadelphia Eagles, in Round 3 of 2008's series.

New York got the early first quarter lead as kicker John Carney got a 22-yard field goal. The Eagles would respond with quarterback Donovan McNabb getting a 1-yard touchdown run. The Giants would answer in the second quarter as the defense forced McNabb into an intentional grounding penalty from his own endzone, giving them a safety. Afterwards, Carney would give New York the lead with a 34-yard field goal. However, Philadelphia would get the halftime lead as kicker David Akers got a 25-yard field goal.

The Giants would regain the lead in the third quarter as Carney made a 36-yard field goal, but the Eagles got the lead again as Akers kicked a 35-yard field goal. In the fourth quarter, Philadelphia took control as McNabb completed a 1-yard touchdown pass to tight end Brent Celek, followed by Akers nailing a 20-yard field goal. New York tried to rally, but the Eagles' defense would shut down any last attempt at a comeback.

With the loss, the Giants' season ended with an overall record of 12–5. This would be the final playoff game at Giants Stadium, as the Giants would move to New Meadowlands Stadium in 2010 after missing the playoffs in 2009. The Philadelphia Eagles became the first, and ultimately only, team to beat the Giants twice in the same season in Giants Stadium – the Giants were 7–2 at home this season and both losses were to the Eagles. It was also the first game in NFL history with a final score of 23–11, thus making it a scorigami.

== Statistics ==
=== Passing ===
Player	G	QB Rat.	Comp.	Att.	Pct.	Yards	TD	INT	Long	Sack
Eli Manning	16	86.4	289	479	60.3	3238	21	10	48	26
David Carr	5	144.1	9	12	75.0	115	2	0	22	1

=== Rushing ===
Player	G	Att.	Yards	Y/G	Avg.	Long	TD	Fum	FumL
Brandon Jacobs	13	219	1089	83.8	5.0	44	15	3	1
Derrick Ward	16	182	1025	64.1	5.6	51	2	2	0
Ahmad Bradshaw	15	67	355	23.7	5.3	77	1	3	0
Domenik Hixon	15	2	26	1.7	13.0	15	0	0	0
Danny Ware	5	2	15	3.0	7.5	9	0	0	0
David Carr	5	8	10	2.0	1.3	7	0	0	0
Eli Manning	16	20	10	.5	.5	13	1	3	2
Madison Hedgecock	16	1	0	0.0	0.0	0	0	0	0
Mario Manningham	8	1	−12	−1.5	−12.0	−12	0	0	0

=== Receiving ===
Player	G	Rec.	Yards	Y/G	Avg.	Long	TD
Steve Smith	16	57	574	35.9	10.1	30	1
Amani Toomer	16	48	580	36.3	12.1	40	4
Domenik Hixon	15	43	596	39.7	13.9	41	2
Derrick Ward	16	41	384	24.0	9.4	48	0
Plaxico Burress	11	35	454	41.3	13.0	33	4
Kevin Boss	14	33	384	27.4	11.6	28	6
Sinorice Moss	10	12	153	15.3	12.8	23	2
Madison Hedgecock	16	8	52	3.3	6.5	13	1
Brandon Jacobs	13	6	36	2.8	6.0	9	0
Ahmad Bradshaw	15	5	42	2.8	8.4	18	1
Darcy Johnson	16	4	46	2.9	11.5	26	2
Mario Manningham	8	4	26	3.3	6.5	11	0
Michael Matthews	14	2	26	1.9	13.0	15	0

=== Defensive ===
Player	G	Tackles	Solo	Assts	Sacks	Int	Int yards	Int avg.	Int TD	Fum. rec	Fum. rec TD
Antonio Pierce	11	65	50	15	1.0	0	0	0	0	0	0
Justin Tuck	12	49	41	8	11.5	1	41	41.0	1	0	0
Aaron Ross	12	49	43	6	0.0	3	58	19.3	1	0	0
Michael Johnson	12	48	28	20	0.0	2	18	9.0	0	1	0
Kenny Phillips	12	48	41	7	0.0	1	0	0	0	0	0
Danny Clark	12	48	27	21	0.0	0	0	0	0	0	0
James Butler	11	47	35	12	0.0	2	15	7.5	0	1	0
Corey Webster	12	36	35	1	1.0	3	65	21.7	0	0	0
Barry Cofield	11	34	27	7	3.0	0	0	0	0	0	0
Mathias Kiwanuka	12	31	22	9	7.0	0	0	0	0	2	0
Chase Blackburn	12	27	18	9	1.0	0	0	0	0	1	0
Kevin Dockery	9	26	23	3	0.0	1	44	44.0	0	0	0
Fred Robbins	11	23	21	2	5.5	0	0	0.0	0	0	0
Bryan Kehl	12	22	15	7	0.0	1	17	17.0	0	0	0
Terrell Thomas	8	19	17	2	0.0	1	13	13.0	0	0	0
Renaldo Wynn	12	16	13	3	1.0	0	0	0.0	0	0	0
Dave Tollefson	9	15	12	3	3.5	0	0	0.0	0	0	0
Jay Alford	11	9	4	5	1.5	0	0	0.0	0	0	0
Sammy Knight	8	8	8	0	0.0	0	0	0.0	0	0	0
Gerris Wilkinson	6	7	3	1	0.0	0	0	0.0	0	0	0
Sam Madison	6	4	3	1	0.0	1	21	21.0	0	0	0
R. W. McQuarters	6	2	1	1	0.0	0	0	0.0	0	0	0
Jeremy Clark	1	2	0	2	0.0	0	0	0.0	0	0	0
Jerome McDougle	8	8	8	0	0.0	0	0	0.0	0	0	0

=== Kicking ===
Player	G	0–19	20–29	30–39	40–49	50+	FGM	FGA	Pct.	Long	XPM	XPA
John Carney	14	0–0	14–14	13–14	4–5	0–0	31	33	93.9	48	37	37
Lawrence Tynes	1	1–1	0–0	0–0	0–0	0–0	1	1	100.0	19	3	3

=== Punting ===
Player	G	Punt	Yards	Avg.	In20	In10	TB	Long
Jeff Feagles	15	60	2621	43.7	22	3	5	61

== See also ==
- List of New York Giants seasons
