= Bryan Kehl =

American football player (born 1984)

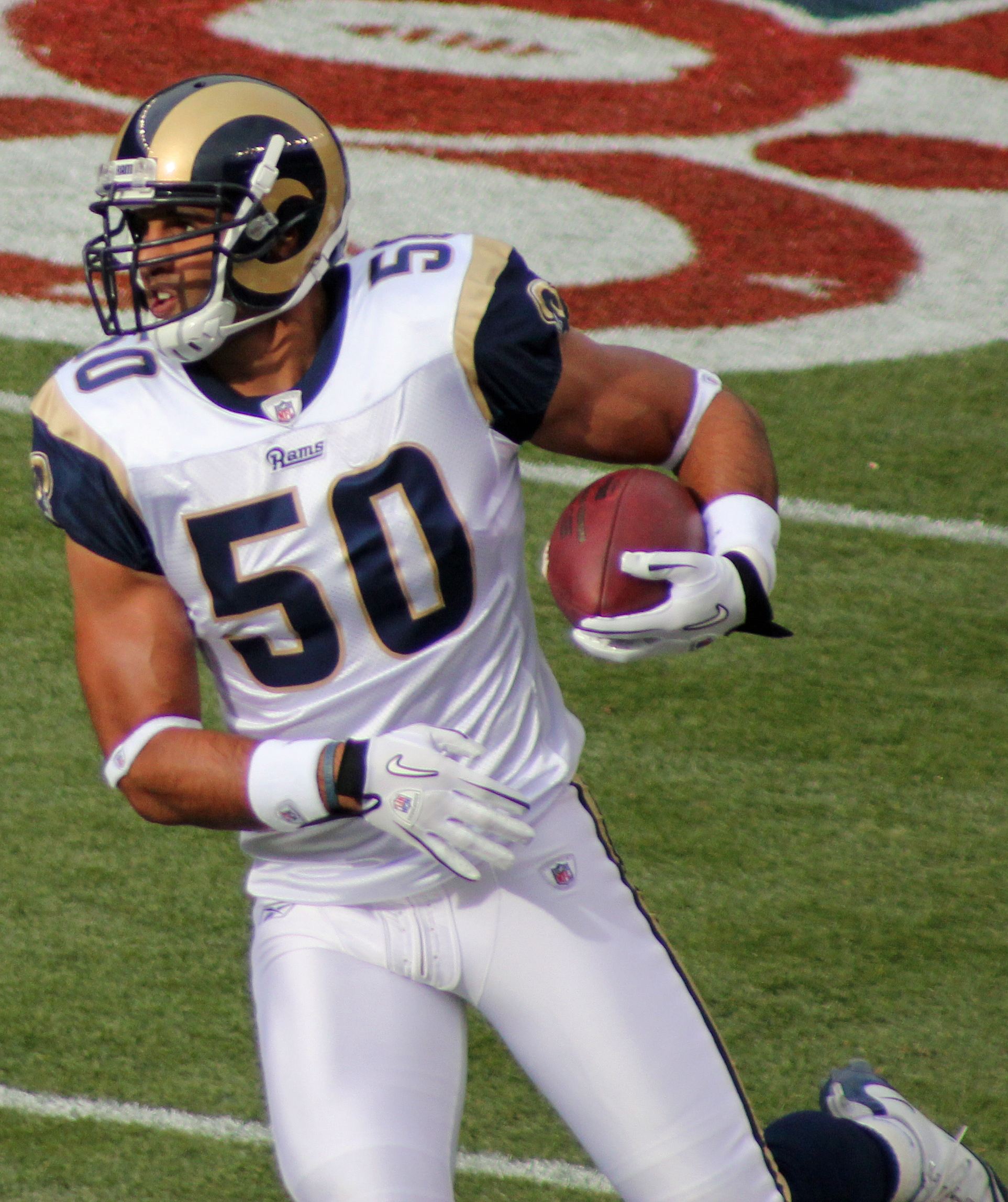
- Kehl with the St. Louis Rams in 2010

No. 53, 55, 50
- Position: Linebacker

Personal information
- Born: June 16, 1984 (age 42); Salt Lake City, Utah, U.S.
- Listed height: 6 ft 2 in (1.88 m)
- Listed weight: 243 lb (110 kg)

Career information
- High school: Brighton (Salt Lake City)
- College: Brigham Young
- NFL draft: 2008: 4th round, 123rd overall pick

Career history
- New York Giants (2008–2010); St. Louis Rams (2010–2011); Washington Redskins (2012)*; Kansas City Chiefs (2012); Washington Redskins (2012–2013)
- * Offseason or practice squad member only

Awards and highlights
- First-team All-MW (2007)

Career NFL statistics
- Total tackles: 122
- Sacks: 1
- Pass deflections: 1
- Interceptions: 1
- Stats at Pro Football Reference

Bryan Kehl (born June 16, 1984) is an American former professional football player who was a linebacker in the National Football League (NFL). He was selected by the New York Giants in the fourth round of the 2008 NFL draft. He played college football for the BYU Cougars.

He was also a member of the St. Louis Rams, Washington Redskins, and Kansas City Chiefs.

== Early life ==
Kehl's biological mother, Amy Evans (married name Smith), found out she was pregnant in 1983 while attending Utah State, where she dated Turner. She loved Turner, but marriage was not in their plans. Evans decided to give up Kehl for adoption to experienced foster parents, Gary and Nancy Kehl.

Kehl's biological father, Maurice Turner, is a former NFL running back. Kehl's half-brother, Billy Turner, plays offensive tackle for the New York Jets.

== College career ==
As a freshman Bryan was recruited by Utah, Oregon, Utah State, Harvard, Yale, Penn, BYU, and Idaho State. He eventually decided to play his college ball at Brigham Young University in 2002 while majoring in mechanical engineering and business. He played his freshman year as a reserve right outside linebacker before taking time off from school and football to participate in an LDS Church mission to Toronto for two years. His freshman year, he recorded 14 tackles, 6 of which were solo tackles in 11 games. He also earned the "prep team defensive player of the week award" versus Utah State along with letterman honors. In 2005 when he returned for his second year of college, Bryan played in 11 games as a backup right outside linebacker. He recorded 30 tackles, 15 of which were solo and received letterman honors. Some of these tackles included 4 which were in the Las Vegas Bowl against California. He also blocked a punt that propelled BYU to its only score against Boston College.

In 2006 when Bryan was a junior, he started as BYU's weakside linebacker. This season he was ranked third on the team with 70 total tackles, 30 of which were solo and 8 tackles for a total loss. He also had three sacks, a recovered fumble, and led BYU linebackers during the season with 6 pass break-ups. He was an honorable mention All-Mountain West and Academic All-Mountain West Conference honors recipient. In 2007 as a senior, Kehl received First-team All-Mountain West Conference honors. He was named the team's defensive MVP, one of the captains, and earned the Strength and Conditioning Award. He ended his senior year with a career-high 91 tackles, 52 of which were solo. He put up 11.5 stops behind the line of scrimmage and caused and recovered a fumble during his senior year. He deflected four passes and had an interception in three consecutive games, one of which was returned for a touchdown.

== Professional career ==
Pre-draft measurables
Height	Weight	Arm length	Hand span	40-yard dash	10-yard split	20-yard split	20-yard shuttle	Three-cone drill	Vertical jump	Broad jump	Bench press
6 ft 2 1/4 in (1.89 m)	242 lb (110 kg)	32 3/4 in (0.83 m)	9 1/2 in (0.24 m)	4.56 s	1.54 s	2.62 s	4.18 s	6.54 s	35 in (0.89 m)	10 ft 2 in (3.10 m)	26 reps
All values from NFL Combine/Pro Day.

=== New York Giants ===
Kehl was selected in the fourth round of the 2008 NFL draft by the New York Giants. The Giants traded up (from 130 to 123 overall) by swapping picks with the Pittsburgh Steelers and giving up one of their sixth round picks (194 overall). He was placed second on the depth chart as weak side linebacker behind Gerris Wilkinson. Kehl made his first NFL start on October 26 for the injured Gerris Wilkinson when the Giants beat the Steelers in Pittsburgh. Bryan got his first interception of his NFL career in this game. He picked off Steelers quarterback Ben Roethlisberger and ran it back for 17 yards.

Kehl was waived by the Giants on September 14, 2010.

=== St. Louis Rams ===
Kehl was claimed off waivers by the St. Louis Rams on September 15, 2010.

=== Washington Redskins (first stint) ===
On April 23, 2012, Kehl signed with the Washington Redskins. For the team's 3-4 defensive scheme, he switched from an outside linebacker to an inside linebacker to play a backup role to London Fletcher and Perry Riley. Kehl was cut on August 31, 2012, for final cuts before the start of the 2012 season.

=== Kansas City Chiefs ===
On October 2, 2012, Kehl was signed by the Chiefs. On November 27, 2012, Kehl was waived by the Chiefs after playing only 3 games for the team.

=== Washington Redskins (second stint) ===
On November 28, 2012, Kehl was claimed off waivers by the Redskins. Set to be a free agent again for the 2013 season, the Redskins re-signed him to another one-year contract on March 14, 2013. In the Week 6 game against the Dallas Cowboys, he tore the ACL in his left knee and was placed on injured reserve the next day.

== NFL career statistics ==
Legend
**Bold**	Career high

=== Regular season ===
Year	Team	Games		Tackles					Interceptions					Fumbles			
Year	Team	GP	GS	Cmb	Solo	Ast	Sck	TFL	Int	Yds	TD	Lng	PD	FF	FR	Yds	TD
2008	NYG	**16**	**2**	**35**	25	**10**	**1.0**	2	**1**	**17**	0	**17**	**1**	0	0	0	0
2009	NYG	14	1	22	16	6	0.0	0	0	0	0	0	0	0	**2**	0	0
2010	NYG	1	0	3	2	1	0.0	0	0	0	0	0	0	0	0	0	0
2010	STL	14	1	**35**	**28**	7	0.0	**4**	0	0	0	0	0	0	0	0	0
2011	STL	14	1	15	14	1	0.0	2	0	0	0	0	0	0	0	0	0
2012	KAN	3	0	0	0	0	0.0	0	0	0	0	0	0	0	0	0	0
2012	WAS	5	0	6	5	1	0.0	0	0	0	0	0	0	0	0	0	0
2013	WAS	5	0	6	5	1	0.0	0	0	0	0	0	0	0	0	0	0
		72	5	122	95	27	1.0	8	1	17	0	17	1	0	2	0	0

=== Playoffs ===
Year	Team	Games		Tackles					Interceptions					Fumbles			
Year	Team	GP	GS	Cmb	Solo	Ast	Sck	TFL	Int	Yds	TD	Lng	PD	FF	FR	Yds	TD
2008	NYG	**1**	0	**1**	**1**	0	0.0	0	0	0	0	0	0	0	0	0	0
2012	WAS	**1**	0	0	0	0	0.0	0	0	0	0	0	0	0	0	0	0
		2	0	1	1	0	0.0	0	0	0	0	0	0	0	0	0	0
