= Cliff Louis =

American gridiron football player (born 1984)

No. 63, 58, 55, 65
- Position: Guard / Offensive tackle

Personal information
- Born: August 24, 1984 (age 42); Brooklyn, New York, U.S.
- Listed height: 6 ft 8 in (2.03 m)
- Listed weight: 315 lb (143 kg)

Career information
- High school: Stamford (CT) Westhill
- College: Morgan State
- NFL draft: 2007: undrafted

Career history
- Cleveland Browns (2007–2008)*; New York Giants (2008)*; Jacksonville Jaguars (2008)*; New York Giants (2008)*; Florida Tuskers (2009)*; Arizona Cardinals (2009)*; Edmonton Eskimos (2010)*; New York Giants (2010)*; Detroit Lions (2010)*; Dallas Cowboys (2010)*; Hartford Colonials (2010); Cleveland Gladiators (2011); Edmonton Eskimos (2013)
- * Offseason or practice squad member only

Awards and highlights
- Second-team All-MEAC (2006)
- Stats at Pro Football Reference

Clifford Louis (born August 24, 1984) is a former gridiron football guard and offensive tackle. He was signed by the Cleveland Browns as an undrafted free agent in 2007. He played college football at Morgan State.

Louis has also been a member of the Jacksonville Jaguars, New York Giants, Florida Tuskers, Arizona Cardinals, Detroit Lions, and Dallas Cowboys.

== Early life ==
Louis attended Westhill High School in Stamford, Connecticut.

== College career ==
Louis played college football at Morgan State University in Baltimore, Maryland.

== Professional career ==
=== Cleveland Browns ===
Louis was signed by the Cleveland Browns as an undrafted rookie free agent on May 8, 2007. He was waived on August 14, 2008.

=== First stint with Giants ===
Louis was claimed off waivers by the New York Giants on August 15, 2008. He was released on August 30 during final cuts.

=== Jacksonville Jaguars ===
On September 2, 2008, Louis was signed to the practice squad of the Jacksonville Jaguars. He was released on September 9.

=== Second stint with Giants ===
Louis was re-signed to the practice squad of the New York Giants on October 22, 2008, after the team released cornerback Rashad Barksdale. He was released on October 28, but re-signed on November 6 after defensive end Wallace Gilberry was signed by the Kansas City Chiefs.

Following the season, Louis was re-signed to a future contract on January 12, 2009. He was waived on September 5, 2009.

=== Florida Tuskers ===
Louis attended 2009 training camp with the Florida Tuskers of the United Football League. He was released on September 29.

=== Arizona Cardinals ===
Louis was signed to the Arizona Cardinals' practice squad on December 22, 2009. He was released two days later on December 24.

=== Edmonton Eskimos ===
Louis signed with the Edmonton Eskimos on April 20, 2010.

=== Third stint with Giants ===
Louis signed with the New York Giants on August 7, 2010. He was waived on August 20.

=== Detroit Lions ===
Louis signed with the Detroit Lions on August 23, 2010. He was waived on September 4, 2010.

=== Dallas Cowboys ===
Louis was signed to the Dallas Cowboys' practice squad after he was waived by Detroit. He was cut on September 17, 2010.

=== Cleveland Gladiators ===
He was picked up by the Cleveland Gladiators in 2011, and has helped them to the playoffs.
