= Maurice Turner (American football) =

American football player (born 1960)

No. 24, 20, 42
- Position: Running back

Personal information
- Born: September 10, 1960 (age 66); Salt Lake City, Utah, U.S.
- Listed height: 5 ft 11 in (1.80 m)
- Listed weight: 200 lb (91 kg)

Career information
- High school: Layton (Layton, Utah)
- College: Utah State
- NFL draft: 1983: 12th round, 325th overall pick

Career history
- Minnesota Vikings (1984–1985); Green Bay Packers (1985); Minnesota Vikings (1986)*; New York Jets (1987)
- * Offseason or practice squad member only

Career NFL statistics
- Returns yards: 82
- Stats at Pro Football Reference

Maurice Antoine Turner (born September 10, 1960) is an American former professional football player who was a running back in the National Football League (NFL). He played college football for the Utah State Aggies. Turner was selected by the Minnesota Vikings in the twelfth round of the 1983 NFL draft and would play with the team during the 1984 NFL season before splitting the following season between the Vikings and the Green Bay Packers. After a year away from the NFL, he was a member of the New York Jets during the 1987 NFL season.

His youngest son, Billy Turner, was an All-American offensive lineman at North Dakota State, and played as an offensive tackle for the New York Jets. His oldest son, Bryan Kehl, is a former NFL linebacker.
