= Barry Cofield =

American football player (born 1984)

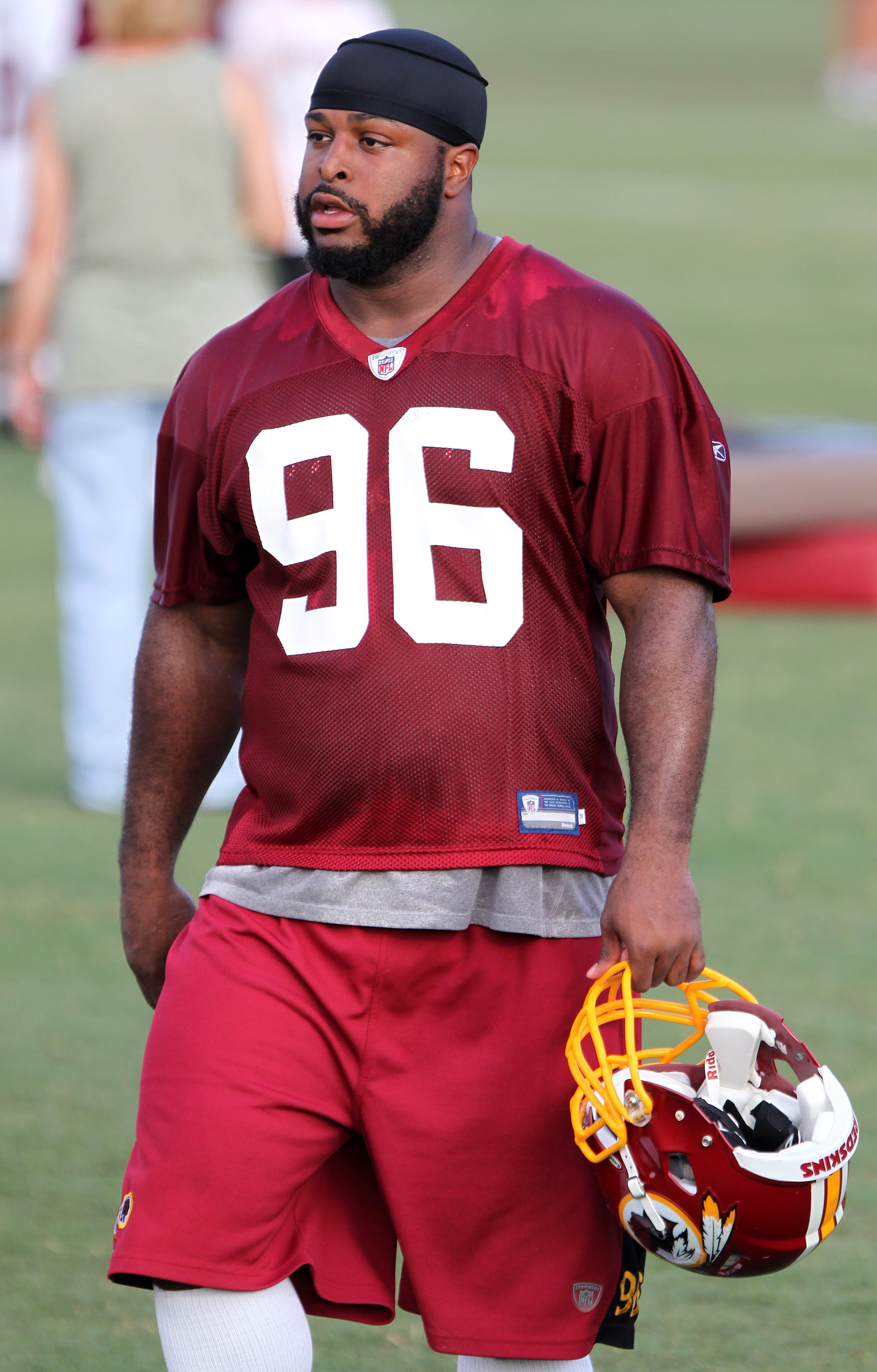
- Cofield with the Washington Redskins in 2011

No. 96, 98
- Position: Defensive tackle

Personal information
- Born: March 19, 1984 (age 42); Cleveland, Ohio, U.S.
- Listed height: 6 ft 4 in (1.93 m)
- Listed weight: 303 lb (137 kg)

Career information
- High school: Cleveland Heights (Cleveland Heights, Ohio)
- College: Northwestern (2002–2005)
- NFL draft: 2006: 4th round, 124th overall pick

Career history
- New York Giants (2006–2010); Washington Redskins (2011–2014); New York Giants (2015)

Awards and highlights
- Super Bowl champion (XLII); PFWA All-Rookie Team (2006); Second-team All-Big Ten (2005)

Career NFL statistics
- Total tackles: 311
- Sacks: 19.5
- Forced fumbles: 4
- Fumble recoveries: 3
- Pass deflections: 25
- Stats at Pro Football Reference

Barry Joseph Cofield Jr. (born March 19, 1984) is an American former professional football player who was a defensive tackle for 10 seasons in the National Football League (NFL). He was selected in the fourth round by the New York Giants in the 2006 NFL draft and also played for the Washington Redskins. He played college football at Northwestern University.

== Early life ==
Cofield attended Cleveland Heights High School where he was a letterman in football, basketball, baseball, and track. In football, as a senior, he was named as an All-Midwest Region selection by SuperPrep, was a second-team All-State selection, was a first-team All-Lake Erie selection, and an All-District selection. In basketball, he was an All-League selection and an All-District Honorable Mention selection.

Regarded as a three-star prospect, Cofield was listed as the No. 50 strongside defensive end in his class by Rivals.com. He chose Northwestern over Vanderbilt, and also had offers from Georgia Tech, Indiana, and Pittsburgh.

Barry Cofield is among the Cleveland Heights High alumni featured in the book Every Tiger Has a Tale.

== College career ==
He played college football at Northwestern University playing in 49 games with 36 starts and starting 36 of his last 37 games. A versatile player, Cofield started at right defensive tackle, left defensive end and left defensive tackle during his career. He finished with 197 tackles (88 solo), 6.5 sacks, and 15.5 stops for losses and registered 18 quarterback pressures with 8 pass deflections and a 16-yard interception return. He also recovered 3 fumbles and forced 4 others. He posted 5.5 of his 6.5 sacks and 11.5 of his 15.5 stops behind the line of scrimmage in his last 2 years. He played in every game as a true freshman in 2002 and registered 36 tackles (14 solo) with 2 stops for losses while causing and recovering a fumble in 12 contests. He earned a starting job at left defensive end as a sophomore and had 46 tackles (19 solo) in 13 contests. He added 1 sack, 2 stops for losses, 6 quarterback pressures, a forced fumble and a fumble recovery. He played right defensive tackle in 2004, when he started 11 games, collected 52 tackles with 3.5 sacks and 5 stops behind the line of scrimmage. Cofield added 5 pressures and batted away 3 passes. He earned Second-team All-Big Ten honors as a senior in 2005, when he lined up at left defensive tackle and recorded a career-high 63 tackles (24 solo) and had 2 sacks with 6.5 stops for losses and 7 pressures. He forced 2 fumbles, recovered another, deflected 5 passes and returned an interception 16 yards.

== Professional career ==
=== Pre-draft ===
Projected as a mid-third-round draft selection, Cofield was described by Sports Illustrated as an "athletic prospect who flashes ability" and "offers potential at defensive tackle or as a two-gap lineman."

Pre-draft measurables
Height	Weight	Arm length	Hand span	40-yard dash	10-yard split	20-yard split	20-yard shuttle	Three-cone drill	Vertical jump	Broad jump	Bench press	Wonderlic
6 ft 4 in (1.93 m)	304 lb (138 kg)	31 1/2 in (0.80 m)	9 3/4 in (0.25 m)	4.95 s	1.68 s	2.88 s	4.35 s	7.43 s	34 in (0.86 m)	8 ft 9 in (2.67 m)	35 reps	27
All values from NFL Combine

Cofield had a 465-pound bench press, a 660-pound squat.

=== New York Giants (first stint) ===
Cofield was selected by the New York Giants as the 124th pick in 2006 NFL draft. As a rookie in 2006, he started all 16 regular season games and the NFC Wild Card Game at nose tackle and led the defensive line with 67 tackles (43 solo). He also had 22 QB pressures, 3 quarterback hits and 1.5 sacks. In 2007, played in all 16 regular season games with 15 starts and started all 4 postseason games and finished with 41 tackles (21 solo), 1 sack, 6 quarterback hurries, 4 quarterback hits and 1 pass defensed. In 2008 Cofield started 15 games, made 43 tackles and 3 sacks and forced a fumble. In 2010, his last season with the Giants, Cofield became famous for his 'taser' dance that he would perform after sacking the opposing quarterback.

=== Washington Redskins ===
On July 27, 2011, Cofield agreed to a six-year deal with the Washington Redskins that paid him $12.5 million in guaranteed money. Cofield, originally being a defensive tackle in the Giants' 4-3 defense, was converted to a nose tackle in Redskins' 3-4 defense. He received praise for how well his transition to his new position went due to the short amount time he had to learn how to play the position caused by the 2011 NFL lockout. Cofield would end up starting in all 16 games of the 2011 season and recorded 25 combined tackles, three sacks, and a new career high of eight pass deflections.

On November 14, 2012, during the Redskins' bye week in the 2012 season, Cofield was made a co-defensive captain after a team vote.

Cofield was placed on injured reserve designated for return on September 9, 2014, after suffering a high ankle sprain. The Redskins placed him back on the active roster on November 11, 2014. He was released on February 27, 2015.

=== New York Giants (second stint) ===
On December 17, 2015, Cofield re-signed with the Giants.

== NFL career statistics ==
Legend
**Bold**	Career high

=== Regular season ===
Year	Team	Games		Tackles					Interceptions					Fumbles			
Year	Team	GP	GS	Cmb	Solo	Ast	Sck	TFL	Int	Yds	TD	Lng	PD	FF	FR	Yds	TD
2006	NYG	**16**	**16**	44	32	12	1.5	5	0	0	0	0	3	0	0	0	0
2007	NYG	**16**	15	34	29	5	1.0	3	0	0	0	0	1	0	0	0	0
2008	NYG	15	15	44	32	12	3.0	6	0	0	0	0	1	1	0	0	0
2009	NYG	**16**	**16**	35	23	12	1.0	5	0	0	0	0	2	0	0	0	0
2010	NYG	**16**	**16**	**54**	**40**	14	**4.0**	**8**	0	0	0	0	4	**2**	**1**	0	0
2011	WAS	**16**	**16**	25	15	10	3.0	5	0	0	0	0	**8**	0	**1**	**3**	0
2012	WAS	**16**	**16**	36	15	**21**	2.5	5	0	0	0	0	5	1	0	0	0
2013	WAS	**16**	**16**	32	17	15	2.5	5	0	0	0	0	1	0	**1**	0	0
2014	WAS	8	3	7	5	2	1.0	2	0	0	0	0	0	0	0	0	0
2015	NYG	3	0	0	0	0	0.0	0	0	0	0	0	0	0	0	0	0
		138	129	311	208	103	19.5	44	0	0	0	0	25	4	3	3	0

=== Playoffs ===
Year	Team	Games		Tackles					Interceptions					Fumbles			
Year	Team	GP	GS	Cmb	Solo	Ast	Sck	TFL	Int	Yds	TD	Lng	PD	FF	FR	Yds	TD
2006	NYG	1	1	**5**	**5**	0	0.0	**1**	0	0	0	0	0	0	0	0	0
2007	NYG	**4**	**4**	3	2	1	0.0	0	0	0	0	0	0	0	0	0	0
2008	NYG	1	1	5	2	**3**	0.0	0	0	0	0	0	0	0	0	0	0
2012	WAS	1	1	1	1	0	0.0	0	0	0	0	0	0	**1**	0	0	0
		7	7	14	10	4	0.0	1	0	0	0	0	0	1	0	0	0

== Personal life ==
Cofield's sack celebration was ranked number one in recent NFL history by Bleacher Report.
