= List of NFL 1,000-yard rushing duos =

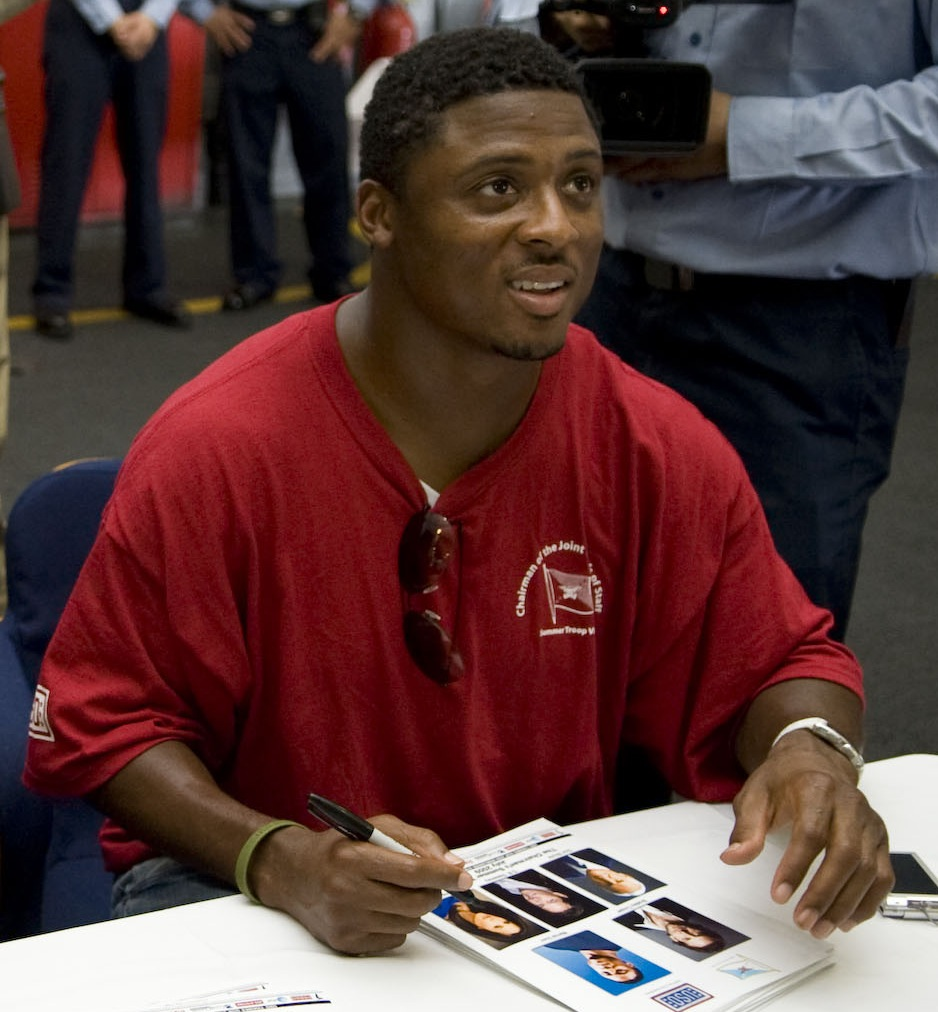
Atlanta Falcons halfback Warrick Dunn recorded 1,140 rushing yards in 2006, the second most yards of any member of a 1,000-yard rushing duo and the most by a halfback.

In American football, running (also referred to as rushing) is, along with passing, one of the two main methods of advancing the ball down the field. A running play generally occurs when the quarterback hands or tosses the ball backwards to the running back, but other players, such as the quarterback, can run with the ball. In the National Football League (NFL), there have been seven pairs of teammates that have each recorded 1,000 rushing yards in the same season. Five of these duos consisted of running backs, and two of them consisted of a running back and a quarterback.

The first 1,000-yard duo consisted of fullback Larry Csonka and halfback Mercury Morris. Csonka and Morris accomplished the feat as members of the Miami Dolphins during their 1972 season, when the team finished undefeated and won the Super Bowl. Morris finished with an even 1,000 yards; he had initially been credited with only 991 yards after the end of the regular season due to a statistician's error that incorrectly removed nine yards from his total. The second 1,000-yard tandem occurred four years later in 1976, when fullback Franco Harris and halfback Rocky Bleier both surpassed 1,000 yards playing for the Pittsburgh Steelers. Fullback Kevin Mack and halfback Earnest Byner became the third 1,000-yard duo, accomplishing the feat during the 1985 Cleveland Browns season.

In 2006, halfback Warrick Dunn and quarterback Michael Vick became the fourth duo with 1,000 rushing yards in the same season, and the first NFC team with such a duo. Vick also became the first quarterback to rush for over 1,000 yards in a single season, while Dunn's 1,140 yards are the most by any player in a 1,000-yard duo. Brandon Jacobs and Derrick Ward of the New York Giants were the fifth duo to accomplish the feat, doing so in 2008. In 2009, Carolina Panthers running backs DeAngelo Williams and Jonathan Stewart became the sixth 1,000 yard rushing duo and the first 1,100 yard rushing duo. Quarterback Lamar Jackson and running back Mark Ingram II of the Baltimore Ravens are the most recent players to have accomplished the feat, having done so in 2019. Jackson broke Vick's single season record for most rushing yards by a quarterback as well as Dunn's record for the most rushing yards of a member of a 1,000-yard rushing duo.

The 1978 Chicago Bears came the closest to having a 1000-yard duo without succeeding, when Walter Payton finished with 1,305 yards but Roland Harper fell 8 yards short of 1,000 with 992. That would have made them the first NFC team with a 1,000 yard rushing duo. The 1973 Cincinnati Bengals came almost as close without having even one 1,000 yard rusher, with Essex Johnson finishing with 997 yards and Boobie Clark finishing with 988 yards.

== 1,000-yard rushing duos ==
Key
Symbol	Meaning
No.	nth duo to have 1,000 rushing yards each
Position	The player's position
GP	Games played
Yds.	Rushing yards
Y/A	Yards per rushing attempt
TDs	Rushing touchdowns
^{^}	Super Bowl champions
†	Pro Bowl player
‡	Pro Football Hall of Fame member
^{*}	Active NFL player

List of teammates with at least 1,000 rushing yards each
No.	Season	Team	Leading rusher	Position	Games	Yds.	Y/A	TDs	Second-leading rusher	Position	Games	Yds.	Y/A	TDs	Ref(s).
1	1972	Miami Dolphins^{^}	Larry Csonka†‡	Fullback	14	1,117	5.2	6	Mercury Morris†	Halfback	14	1,000	5.3	12	
2	1976	Pittsburgh Steelers	Franco Harris†‡	Fullback	14	1,128	3.9	14	Rocky Bleier	Halfback	14	1,036	4.7	5	
3	1985	Cleveland Browns	Kevin Mack†	Fullback	16	1,104	5.0	7	Earnest Byner†	Halfback	16	1,002	4.1	8	
4	2006	Atlanta Falcons	Warrick Dunn†	Halfback	16	1,140	4.0	4	Michael Vick†	Quarterback	16	1,039	8.4	2	
5	2008	New York Giants	Brandon Jacobs	Halfback	13	1,089	5.0	15	Derrick Ward	Halfback	16	1,025	5.6	2	
6	2009	Carolina Panthers	Jonathan Stewart	Halfback	16	1,133	5.1	10	DeAngelo Williams†	Halfback	13	1,117	5.2	7	
7	2019	Baltimore Ravens	Lamar Jackson †*	Quarterback	15	1,206	6.9	7	Mark Ingram II †*	Halfback	15	1,018	5.0	10	
