= Derrick Ward =

American football player (born 1980)

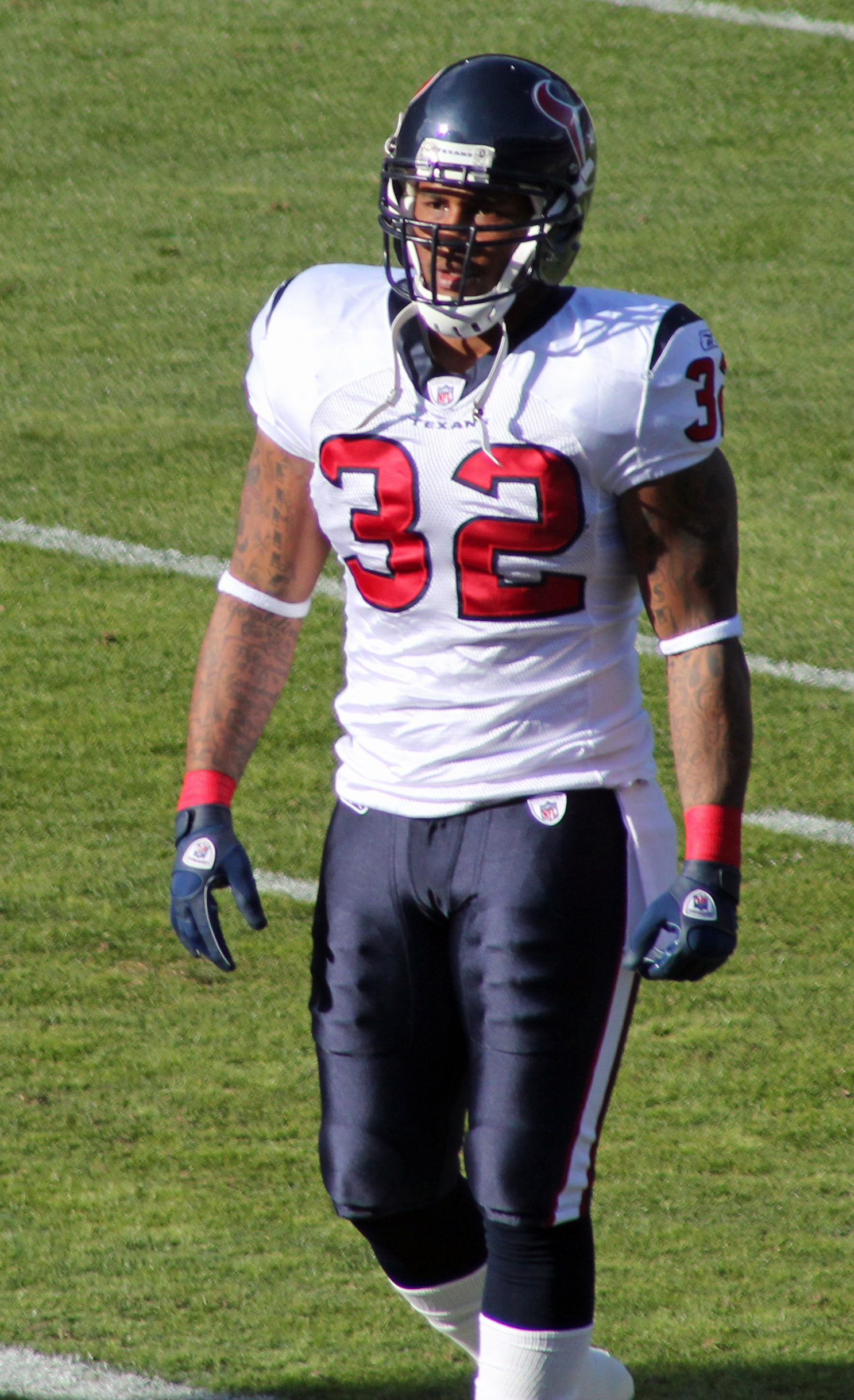
- Ward with the Houston Texans in 2010

No. 44, 34, 28, 32
- Position: Running back

Personal information
- Born: August 30, 1980 (age 46); Los Angeles, California, U.S.
- Listed height: 5 ft 11 in (1.80 m)
- Listed weight: 240 lb (109 kg)

Career information
- High school: Valley View (Moreno Valley, California)
- College: Fresno State (1998–2002); Ottawa (2003)
- NFL draft: 2004: 7th round, 235th overall pick

Career history
- New York Jets (2004)*; New York Giants (2004–2008); Tampa Bay Buccaneers (2009); Houston Texans (2010–2011)
- * Offseason or practice squad member only

Awards and highlights
- Super Bowl champion (XLII)

Career NFL statistics
- Rushing attempts: 551
- Rushing yards: 2,628
- Rushing touchdowns: 12
- Receptions: 96
- Receiving yards: 787
- Receiving touchdowns: 3
- Stats at Pro Football Reference

Derrick Laron Ward (born August 30, 1980) is an American former professional football player who was a running back in the National Football League (NFL). He was selected by the New York Jets in the seventh round of the 2004 NFL draft and played for the New York Giants, Tampa Bay Buccaneers and Houston Texans. He played college football for Fresno State Bulldogs and Ottawa Braves.

Ward earned a Super Bowl ring with the Giants in Super Bowl XLII. He is the cousin of former Patriots running back J.R. Redmond.

== Early life ==
Ward attended Valley View High School in Moreno Valley, California, and was a letterman in football. In football, as a senior, he posted 1,100 rushing yards, 973 receiving yards, and 17 touchdowns, was an All-Riverside County choice, won All-CIF honors, was the Team Co/MVP, and was named the Sun Belt League Offensive MVP.

== College career ==
For his collegiate career, he rushed 460 times for 3,152 yards (6.9-yard avg.) and 39 touchdowns and caught seven passes for 96 yards (13.7-yard avg.).

=== Fresno State ===
He gained 1,091 yards with 11 touchdowns on 197 carries (5.5-yard avg.) and caught three passes for 49 yards (16.3-yard avg.) in 20 games at California State University, Fresno. Ward was ruled academically ineligible to play at Fresno State in 1998, he earned Freshman All-America honors the following year despite playing with a broken right hand. He was limited to only seven games for the Bulldogs in 2000 due to a knee injury. His Fresno State career ended when he was again ruled ineligible to play in 2001 and 2002 due to academics.

=== Ottawa ===
Ward transferred to Ottawa University in Kansas for his final year in 2003, when he set NAIA single-season records with 2,061 rushing yards, 28 touchdowns and 7.8 yards per carry. He also recorded 47 yards on four receptions, in ten games at Ottawa.

== Professional career ==
=== New York Jets ===
Ward was selected by the New York Jets in the seventh round of the 2004 NFL draft with the 235th overall pick.

On September 5, 2004, Ward was released by the Jets.

=== New York Giants ===
Ward would be picked up by the New York Giants during the 2004 season.

In 2007, Ward rushed for 602 yards on 125 touches, averaging 4.8 yards per carry and scoring three touchdowns. On March 14, 2008, Ward was re-signed by the Giants.

Because of their success in the backfield during the 2008 season, Ward and his teammates Brandon Jacobs and Ahmad Bradshaw were jokingly referred to as Earth (Jacobs), Wind (Ward) and Fire (Bradshaw). On December 21, 2008, Ward led the Giants' rushing attack with 215 rushing yards in a 34–28 overtime victory over the Carolina Panthers to clinch homefield advantage throughout the 2008–09 NFL playoffs. He finished the 2008 season with 1,025 yards, making him and Brandon Jacobs the fifth pair of teammates to rush for 1,000 yards in a single season. The strong performance by both running backs is credited to high grade run blocking by the Giants offensive line.

While playing with the Giants, Ward was a resident of Weehawken, New Jersey.

=== Tampa Bay Buccaneers ===
Ward was signed by the Tampa Bay Buccaneers on March 2, 2009. He signed a four-year contract worth $17 million. In the 2009 season for the Buccaneers he rushed 114 times for 409 yards and 1 touchdown. Ward was cut from the team on August 31, 2010.

=== Houston Texans ===
On September 4, 2010, Ward was signed by the Houston Texans. On July 3, 2012, Ward announced his retirement via Twitter.

== NFL career statistics ==
Legend
| | Led the league |
| **Bold** | Career high |

=== Regular season ===
| Year | Team | Games | | Rushing | | | | | Receiving | | | | |
| Year | Team | GP | GS | Att | Yds | Avg | Lng | TD | Rec | Yds | Avg | Lng | TD |
|---|---|---|---|---|---|---|---|---|---|---|---|---|---|
| 2004 | NYG | 5 | 0 | 0 | 0 | 0.0 | 0 | 0 | 0 | 0 | 0.0 | 0 | 0 |
| 2005 | NYG | 14 | 0 | 35 | 123 | 3.5 | 12 | 0 | 2 | 13 | 6.5 | 8 | 0 |
| 2006 | NYG | 8 | 0 | 0 | 0 | 0.0 | 0 | 0 | 0 | 0 | 0.0 | 0 | 0 |
| 2007 | NYG | 8 | 5 | 125 | 602 | 4.8 | 44 | 3 | 26 | 179 | 6.9 | 17 | 1 |
| 2008 | NYG | 16 | 3 | **182** | **1,025** | 5.6 | **51** | 2 | **41** | **384** | **9.4** | **48** | 0 |
| 2009 | TAM | 14 | 1 | 114 | 409 | 3.6 | 28 | 1 | 20 | 150 | 7.5 | 38 | **2** |
| 2010 | HOU | 16 | 0 | 50 | 315 | **6.3** | 38 | **4** | 7 | 61 | 8.7 | 12 | 0 |
| 2011 | HOU | 12 | 1 | 45 | 154 | 3.4 | 15 | 2 | 0 | 0 | 0.0 | 0 | 0 |
| | | 93 | 10 | 551 | 2,628 | 4.8 | 51 | 12 | 96 | 787 | 8.2 | 48 | 3 |

=== Postseason ===
| Year | Team | Games | | Rushing | | | | | Receiving | | | | |
| Year | Team | GP | GS | Att | Yds | Avg | Lng | TD | Rec | Yds | Avg | Lng | TD |
|---|---|---|---|---|---|---|---|---|---|---|---|---|---|
| 2008 | NYG | 1 | 0 | **12** | **46** | **3.8** | **14** | 0 | **5** | **24** | **4.8** | **8** | 0 |
| 2011 | HOU | 2 | 0 | 0 | 0 | 0.0 | 0 | 0 | 0 | 0 | 0.0 | 0 | 0 |
| | | 3 | 0 | 12 | 46 | 3.8 | 14 | 0 | 5 | 24 | 4.8 | 8 | 0 |
