= Darcy Johnson =

American football player (born 1983)

No. 48, 84, 87
- Position: Tight end

Personal information
- Born: February 11, 1983 (age 43); St. Augustine, Florida, U.S.
- Listed height: 6 ft 5 in (1.96 m)
- Listed weight: 267 lb (121 kg)

Career information
- College: UCF
- NFL draft: 2006: undrafted

Career history
- New York Giants (2006–2009); St. Louis Rams (2010); Virginia Destroyers (2011)

Awards and highlights
- Super Bowl champion (XLII); Second-team All-Conference USA (2005)

Career NFL statistics
- Receptions: 9
- Receiving yards: 78
- Receiving touchdowns: 2
- Stats at Pro Football Reference

Darcy Johnson (born February 11, 1983) is an American former professional football player who was a tight end in the National Football League (NFL). He played college football for the UCF Golden Knights. Johnson was signed by the New York Giants as an undrafted free agent in 2006. He also played for the St. Louis Rams.

== College career ==
He played in 48 games with 35 starts at the University of Central Florida. He caught 81 passes for 919 yards (11.3-yard avg.) and scored 6 touchdowns while recording 14 tackles (8 solo) on special teams, also had a 22-yard kickoff return. Johnson earned All-Conference USA 2nd-team honors in 2005 as a senior, he was ranked 3rd on the squad with 36 catches for 435 yards (12.1-yard avg.) and 2 touchdowns. He graduated in May 2005 with a degree in criminal justice

== Professional career ==
=== New York Giants ===
An undrafted rookie, Johnson was a member of the Giants' practice squad for the 2006 season. He signed with the active roster on December 26, 2006.

Johnson was placed on the injured reserve, ending his 2007 season. Darcy suffered a partial tear of his ACL and underwent surgery to repair it.

Johnson's first career reception was a 1-yard touchdown catch thrown by Eli Manning against the Baltimore Ravens November 16, 2008.

Johnson was placed on injured reserve by the Giants on December 23, 2009.

=== St. Louis Rams ===
Johnson signed with the St. Louis Rams on March 22, 2010. He was placed on the injured reserve list on October 12.

=== Virginia Destroyers ===
Johnson was signed by the Virginia Destroyers of the United Football League on September 1, 2011.

== Personal ==
Johnson graduated from Palatka High School, located in Palatka Florida, in 2001. As a senior, he finished the season with 30 receptions for 611 yards and nine touchdowns. His performance garnered him all-state, all-county, and all-district honors. Johnson played in the Florida-Georgia All-Star Game and was rated the No. 60 prospect in the state of Florida by the Orlando Sentinel.

His brother Willie Offord played four seasons as a defensive back with the Minnesota Vikings.
