= Micah Rucker =

American football player (born 1985)

No. 88
- Position: Wide receiver

Personal information
- Born: January 4, 1985 (age 41); Bonita Springs, Florida, U.S.
- Listed height: 6 ft 6 in (1.98 m)
- Listed weight: 219 lb (99 kg)

Career information
- High school: Estero (Estero, Florida)
- College: Minnesota (2004–2005); Eastern Illinois (2006–2007)

Career history
- Pittsburgh Steelers (2008)*; Kansas City Chiefs (2008)*; New York Giants (2008–2009)*; Orlando Predators (2010)*; Chicago Rush (2011); New Orleans VooDoo (2012)*
- * Offseason or practice squad member only

Awards and highlights
- 2× First-team All-OVC (2006–2007)
- Stats at ArenaFan.com

Micah Rucker (born January 4, 1985) is an American former football wide receiver. He was signed by the Pittsburgh Steelers as an undrafted free agent in 2008. He played college football at Eastern Illinois.

== College ==
Rucker started his college career at Minnesota before transferring to Eastern Illinois. At EIU, Rucker caught 49 passes for 966 yards and 11 touchdowns in 2006. In 2007, he caught 55 passes for 777 yards and seven scores.

== NFL ==
Rucker was also a member of the Kansas City Chiefs and the New York Giants. The Giants cut him on July 30, 2009, to make room for incoming draft picks.

== Arena Football League ==
Rucker signed with the Orlando Predators of the Arena Football League during the 2010 offseason. Before the season, Rucker was traded to the Chicago Rush for wide receiver Robert Quiroga and became one of Chicago's three starting wide receivers, catching 18 passes, 161 yards and four touchdowns through four games.
