= Mike Fladell =

American football player (born 1985)

No. 72
- Position: Offensive tackle

Personal information
- Born: October 5, 1985 (age 41); Queens, New York, U.S.
- Listed height: 6 ft 7 in (2.01 m)
- Listed weight: 334 lb (151 kg)

Career information
- College: Rutgers

Career history
- New York Giants (2008–2009)*; New York Jets (2009)*; New York Sentinels (2009); Omaha Nighthawks (2010)*
- * Offseason or practice squad member only

Mike Fladell (born October 5, 1985) is an American former football offensive tackle. He was signed by the New York Giants as an undrafted free agent in 2008. He played college football at Rutgers. Fladell was also a member of the New York Jets, New York Sentinels and Omaha Nighthawks.
