= Na'Shan Goddard =

American gridiron football player (born 1983)

No. 70, 76
- Position: Offensive tackle

Personal information
- Born: April 23, 1983 (age 43); Dayton, Ohio, U.S.
- Listed height: 6 ft 6 in (1.98 m)
- Listed weight: 315 lb (143 kg)

Career information
- High school: Dunbar (Dayton)
- College: South Carolina
- NFL draft: 2006: undrafted

Career history
- New York Giants (2006); New York Jets (2006); New York Giants (2007–2008)*; Seattle Seahawks (2008–2009); New Orleans Saints (2009–2010)*; Florida Tuskers (2010); Virginia Destroyers (2011); Calgary Stampeders (2012)
- * Offseason or practice squad member only

Awards and highlights
- 2× Super Bowl champion (XLII, XLIV); UFL champion (2011); Freshman All-American (2002); All-SEC (2005); Sporting News Freshman All-SEC (2002); Outback Bowl champion (2002); Celebration Bowl champion (2021); Grey Cup (2012)

Career NFL statistics
- Games played: 2
- Stats at Pro Football Reference

Na'Shan Goddard (born April 23, 1983) is an American former professional football player who was an offensive tackle in the National Football League (NFL). He played college football for the South Carolina Gamecocks. He was signed by the New York Giants as an undrafted free agent in 2006. He was the offensive line coach at South Carolina State, where he won three MEAC titles. He spent time as the offensive line coach at the University of West Georgia and Mercer University. He is now the offensive line assistant coach at LSU.

Goddard was a member of the New York Jets, Seattle Seahawks, New Orleans Saints, New York Giants, Florida Tuskers, Virginia Destroyers, and Calgary Stampeders.
