= Eric Butler (American football) =

American football player (born 1984)

No. 49
- Position: Tight end

Personal information
- Born: September 13, 1984 (age 42); Pascagoula, Mississippi, U.S.
- Listed height: 6 ft 2 in (1.88 m)
- Listed weight: 255 lb (116 kg)

Career information
- College: Mississippi State
- NFL draft: 2008: undrafted

Career history
- New York Giants (2008)*; Indianapolis Colts (2008)*; St. Louis Rams (2009); Oakland Raiders (2010)*
- * Offseason or practice squad member only

Awards and highlights
- Freshman All-SEC (2004)

Michael Eric Butler (born September 13, 1984) is an American former football tight end. He was signed by the New York Giants as an undrafted free agent in 2008. He played college football at Mississippi State.

Butler was also a member of the Indianapolis Colts, St. Louis Rams, and Oakland Raiders.

== College career ==
Butler played in 45 games with 23 starts in four years at tight end for Mississippi State and recorded 50 receptions for 635 yards (12.7-yard avg.) and eight touchdowns. As a senior, played in 13 games with five starts and caught eight passes for 71 yards. He became MSU’s career touchdown leader for a tight end as a sophomore. He became Bulldogs’ single-season touchdown receptions leader for a tight end as a freshman. Butler was named to the SEC All-Freshman and The Sporting News 2004 Freshman All-SEC team.

== Professional career ==
Pre-draft measurables
Height	Weight
6 ft 2 1/2 in (1.89 m)	255 lb (116 kg)
Values from Pro Day

=== New York Giants ===
After going undrafted in the 2008 NFL draft, Butler signed with the New York Giants as an undrafted free agent on April 29, 2008. He was waived by the team during final cuts on August 30.

=== Indianapolis Colts ===
Butler was signed to the practice squad of the Indianapolis Colts on November 14, 2008. He was released by the Colts on November 19.

=== St. Louis Rams ===
Butler was signed by the St. Louis Rams on March 16, 2009. He was waived on November 29. He was re-signed to the practice squad on December 3, 2009. He signed again with the St. Louis Rams on January 13, 2010.

=== Oakland Raiders ===
Butler signed with the Oakland Raiders on August 20, 2010. He was released on August 31.
