= Rashad Barksdale =

American football player (born 1984)

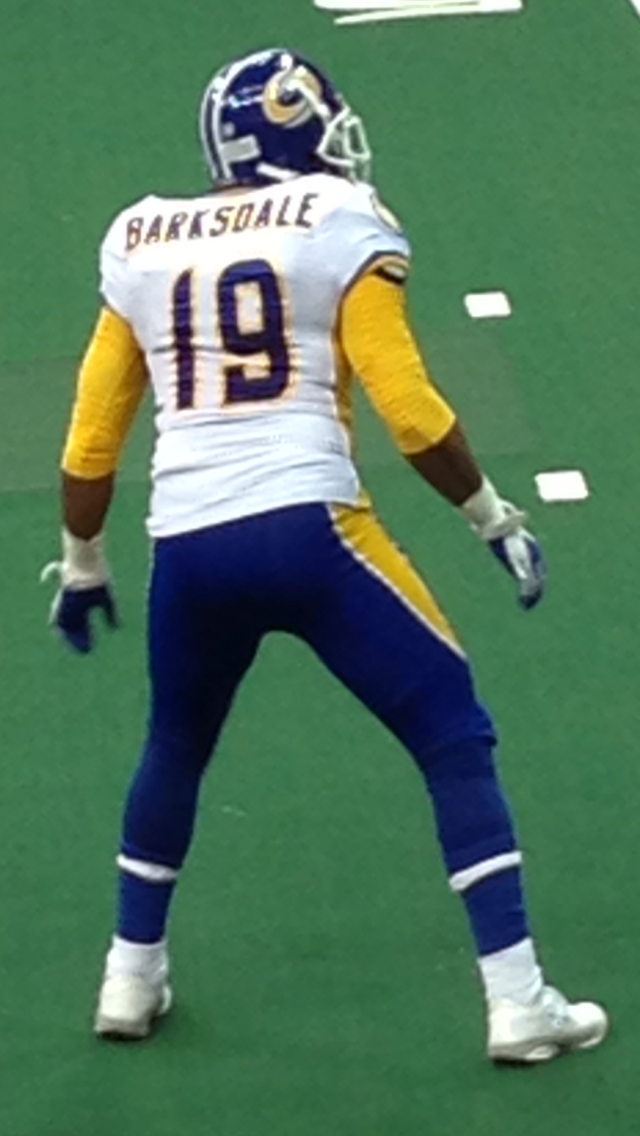
- Barksdale with the Tampa Bay Storm in 2013

No. 31, 35, 25, 23, 21, 19
- Position: Cornerback

Personal information
- Born: May 11, 1984 (age 42); Hudson, New York, U.S.
- Listed height: 6 ft 0 in (1.83 m)
- Listed weight: 208 lb (94 kg)

Career information
- High school: Hudson
- College: Albany
- NFL draft: 2007: 6th round, 201st overall pick

Career history
- Philadelphia Eagles (2007)*; Kansas City Chiefs (2007); New York Giants (2008); New York Jets (2009)*; Arizona Cardinals (2009–2010)*; Calgary Stampeders (2011); Kansas City Command (2011–2012); Tampa Bay Storm (2013); Cleveland Gladiators (2014)
- * Offseason or practice squad member only

Career NFL statistics
- Total tackles: 8
- Stats at Pro Football Reference

Career AFL statistics
- Total tackles: 224
- Interceptions: 5
- Pass deflections: 5
- Forced fumbles: 3
- Fumble recoveries: 6
- Stats at ArenaFan.com

Rashad Emmanuel Unique Barksdale (born May 11, 1984) is an American former professional football player who was a cornerback, primarily in the Arena Football League (AFL). He played college football for the Albany Great Danes and was selected by the Philadelphia Eagles in the sixth round of the 2007 NFL draft.

Barksdale was also a member of the Kansas City Chiefs, New York Giants, New York Jets and Arizona Cardinals, and also played for the Calgary Stampeders of the Canadian Football League (CFL).

== College career ==
At the University at Albany, he led the Great Danes in interceptions and punt returns in 2006.

== Professional career ==
=== Philadelphia Eagles ===
Barksdale was selected by the Philadelphia Eagles in the sixth round (201st overall) of the 2007 NFL draft. He is the second player in Albany history to be drafted into the NFL. He was released by the Eagles on September 1, 2007 during the preseason.

=== Kansas City Chiefs ===
The next day, Barksdale signed a contract to play for the Kansas City Chiefs, which made Barksdale the first player in the history of the SUNY Albany to make an NFL 53-man roster.

Barksdale made his NFL regular season debut on October 7, 2007, making him the first UAlbany player to appear in an NFL regular season game when he took the field on special teams for the opening kickoff. He also played on the punt cover and punt return units and made a fourth-quarter tackle with 6:08 remaining.

Barksdale was released by the Chiefs during final cuts on August 30, 2008.

=== New York Giants ===
Barksdale was signed to the practice squad of the New York Giants on September 1, 2008. He was promoted to the active roster on December 30 when cornerback Sam Madison was placed on injured reserve. He was waived on June 20, 2009.

=== New York Jets ===
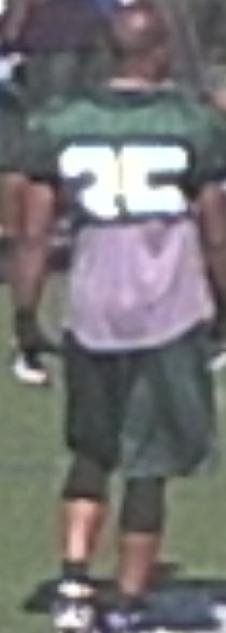
Barksdale with the New York Jets.

Barksdale was claimed off waivers by the New York Jets on June 25, 2009. He was waived on September 5, 2009.

=== Arizona Cardinals ===
The Arizona Cardinals signed Barksdale to their practice squad on September 8. He was re-signed to a future contract on January 18, 2010.

Barksdale was waived on August 6, 2010.

=== Calgary Stampeders ===
In March 2011 Barksdale was signed by the Calgary Stampeders.

=== Kansas City Command ===
In 2011, Barksdale signed to play with the Kansas City Command in the Arena Football League

=== Tampa Bay Storm ===
Barksdale was assigned to the Tampa Bay Storm in 2013. On September 17, 2013, Barksdale was replaced on retirement by the Storm.

=== Cleveland Gladiators ===
Barksdale came out of retirement in July 2014 to help the Cleveland Gladiators in their ArenaBowl attempt.
