= Gerris Wilkinson =

American football player (born 1983)

No. 58, 59
- Position: Linebacker

Personal information
- Born: April 5, 1983 (age 43); Oakland, California, U.S.
- Listed height: 6 ft 3 in (1.91 m)
- Listed weight: 231 lb (105 kg)

Career information
- High school: Skyline (Oakland)
- College: Georgia Tech
- NFL draft: 2006: 3rd round, 96th overall pick

Career history
- New York Giants (2006–2010); Jacksonville Jaguars (2011)*
- * Offseason or practice squad member only

Awards and highlights
- Super Bowl champion (XLII); 2× Second-team All-ACC (2004, 2005)

Career NFL statistics
- Total tackles: 73
- Forced fumbles: 2
- Stats at Pro Football Reference

Gerris Vernard Bowers Wilkinson (born April 5, 1983) is an American former professional football player who was a linebacker in the National Football League (NFL). He was selected by the New York Giants in the third round of the 2006 NFL draft. He played college football for the Georgia Tech Yellow Jackets.

He was also a member of the Jacksonville Jaguars.

== Early life ==
Wilkinson was a SuperPreps First-team All-America and a Second-team All-state and First-team All-city and All-East Bay. He made 127 tackles as a senior with six sacks, four forced fumbles, and three fumble recoveries. He added 85 tackles and eight sacks as a junior.

== College career ==
He played in 50 games with 37 starts for the Yellow Jackets and recorded 253 tackles (121 solo), 12.5 sacks, 38 tackles for losses. He also recorded a forced fumble and two fumble recoveries, and he also deflected six passes and gained 46 yards on three interception returns. He was a two-time team captain and led the squad in tackles in his last two years. He was also the two-time Second-team All-Atlantic Coast Conference selection and began his career as an outside linebacker before starting his final two seasons at middle linebacker. As a strongside defensive end in 2003, he earned Academic All-ACC honors while starting every game. He also collected 47 tackles (24 solo) with four sacks, 12 stops for losses. Wilkinson also recovered two fumbles and batted away a pair of passes. In 2004, he was a Second-team All-Atlantic Coast Conference selection after making 119 tackles. In 2005, Wilkinson became only the third player in the last 15 years to lead the team in tackles in back-to-back seasons. He was also the Second-team All-ACC pick and amassed 85 tackles (42 solo) and had four sacks with nine stops for losses. He also intercepted two passes and deflected two others. He earned his degree in Management on May 7, 2005, and then played his final season while working on a second degree in International Affairs.

== Professional career ==
Pre-draft measurables
Height	Weight	Arm length	Hand span	40-yard dash	10-yard split	20-yard split	20-yard shuttle	Three-cone drill	Vertical jump	Broad jump	Bench press
6 ft 3 in (1.91 m)	233 lb (106 kg)	33 5/8 in (0.85 m)	9 5/8 in (0.24 m)	4.62 s	1.55 s	2.71 s	4.08 s	7.21 s	41.0 in (1.04 m)	10 ft 11 in (3.33 m)	20 reps
All values from NFL Combine/Pro Day

=== New York Giants ===
Wilkinson was selected in the third round of the 2006 NFL draft by the New York Giants with the 96th overall pick. He signed a four-year, $1.7 million contract with the Giants on July 26, 2006. As a rookie in 2006, he played in all 16 regular season games with two starts at weakside linebacker and finished with 15 tackles (ten solo), two passes deflected, two forced fumbles and seven special teams tackles. In 2007, he played in 13 regular season games with no starts and in four postseason games with one start. He finished the regular season with five tackles (three solo), one pass deflected and seven special teams tackles. In his first career start vs. the Houston Texans he contributed three tackles and a forced fumble. His fourth quarter hit on Jameel Cook forced a fumble that was recovered by Corey Webster and ended the Texans’ final drive. In his second season in 2007, he was a key defensive force in winning the 2007 NFC wild card game against the Tampa Bay Buccaneers, starting for the injured Kawika Mitchell and compiling a total of eight tackles.

Wilkinson became the starting weakside linebacker for the Giants in 2008 after Mitchell left as a free agent. In 2008, he played in 8 regular season games with 5 starts before injuring a knee that caused him to sit out the remainder of the season and finished with 11 tackles, of which four were solo, and 2 special teams tackles.

Following the 2010 season, he became an unrestricted free agent.

=== Jacksonville Jaguars ===
On August 13, 2011, Wilkinson signed with the Jacksonville Jaguars. He was waived by the team on August 29.
