= 2009 New York Giants season =

85th season in franchise history

- Owner: John Mara; Steve Tisch
- General manager: Jerry Reese
- Head coach: Tom Coughlin
- Home stadium: Giants Stadium

Results
- Record: 8–8
- Division place: 3rd NFC East
- Playoffs: Did not qualify
- All-Pros: OG Chris Snee (2nd team)
- Pro Bowlers: C Shaun O'Hara; WR Steve Smith; OG Chris Snee; OT David Diehl

Uniform
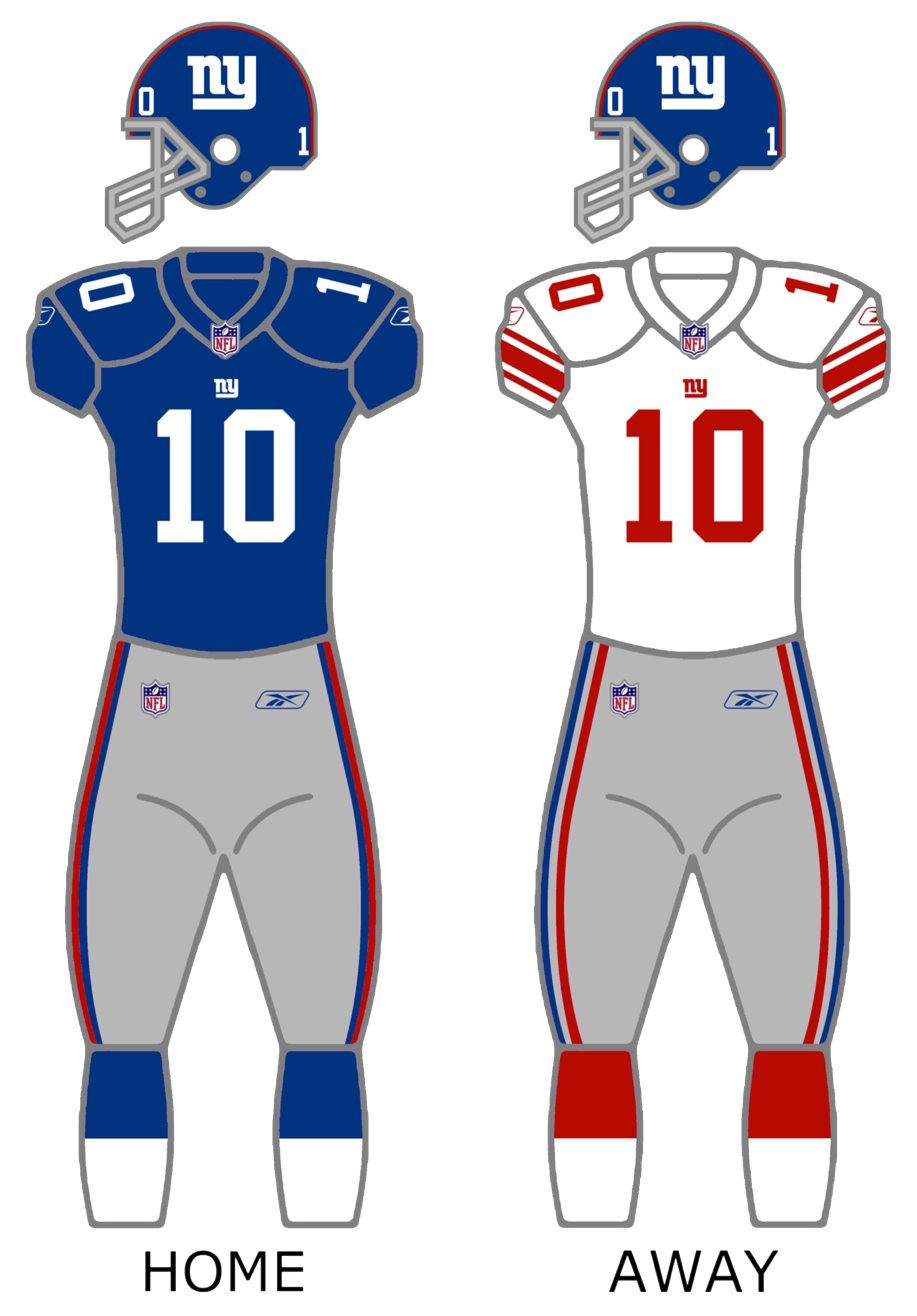

The 2009 New York Giants season was the 85th season for the team in the National Football League (NFL). It was the team's final season in Giants Stadium; in 2010, the Giants moved into New Meadowlands Stadium. The Giants hoped to improve upon their 12–4 record from 2008, avenge their divisional round loss to the Philadelphia Eagles and make the playoffs for the fifth straight year. Despite starting 5–0 to begin the season, they went 3–8 in their next 11 games and finished 3rd in the NFC East.

They were eliminated from playoff contention for the first time since 2004 in Week 16, after the Green Bay Packers and Dallas Cowboys both won. They played teams from the NFC South and AFC West as per the schedule rotation, as well as their regular games with their NFC East rivals. For head coach Tom Coughlin, this was his 6th season as the coach of the Giants. This season also saw the Giants play on Thanksgiving Day for the first time since 1992. They lost to the Denver Broncos 26–6.

== Players ==
=== Movement ===
The Giants signed free-agent defensive end Chris Canty, formerly of the Dallas Cowboys, on March 1, 2009. Canty moved to defensive tackle in the Giants' 4–3 scheme. On April 3, 2009, the Giants released wide receiver Plaxico Burress.

=== Free agents ===
Position	Player	Free agency tag	Date signed	2009 team
WR	Plaxico Burress	Suspended		
SS	James Butler	UFA	March 9, 2009	St. Louis Rams
PK	John Carney	UFA	August 15, 2009	New Orleans Saints
QB	David Carr	UFA	February 9, 2009	New York Giants
S	Craig Dahl	UFA	March 17, 2009	St. Louis Rams
CB	Kevin Dockery	RFA	April 13, 2009	New York Giants
DT	Leger Douzable	ERFA	February 24, 2009	New York Giants
RB	Reuben Droughns	Released		
RB	Kay-Jay Harris	UFA		
RB	Brandon Jacobs	Franchised	February 25, 2009	New York Giants
TE	Darcy Johnson	ERFA	February 24, 2009	New York Giants
FS	Sammy Knight	Released		
CB	Sam Madison	Released		
DE	Jerome McDougle	UFA		
CB	R. W. McQuarters	UFA		
OG	Grey Ruegamer	UFA		
DE	Dave Tollefson	ERFA	February 24, 2009	New York Giants
WR	Amani Toomer	UFA	August 4, 2009	Kansas City Chiefs
RB	Derrick Ward	UFA	March 2, 2009	Tampa Bay Buccaneers
RB	DJ Ware	ERFA	March 26, 2009	New York Giants
QB	Anthony Wright	UFA		
DE	Renaldo Wynn	UFA	March 16, 2009	Washington Redskins
RFA: Restricted free agent, UFA: Unrestricted free agent, ERFA: Exclusive rights free agent

=== 2009 NFL draft ===
After finishing the 2008 season with a 12–4 record, the Giants held the 29th selection in the 2009 NFL draft. With the pick they closed the gap left by Plaxico Burress in the roster, selecting wide receiver Hakeem Nicks of North Carolina. Then in the second round, they selected linebacker Clint Sintim of Virginia with the 45th pick and offensive tackle William Beatty of Connecticut with the 60th pick. Early in the second day of the draft, the Giants traded picks 91 of Round 3 and 164 of Round 5 to Philadelphia Eagles for their pick 85 of Round 3. With this pick the Giants selected another wide receiver, Ramses Barden of Cal Poly. In the same round they selected tight end Travis Beckum of Wisconsin with the 100th pick of the draft. In the following rounds they selected running back Andre Brown of North Carolina State with the 129th pick in fourth round, quarterback Rhett Bomar of Sam Houston State with the 151st pick in the fifth round, defensive back DeAndre Wright of New Mexico with the 200th pick in the sixth round and with their final pick in the seventh round they selected another defensive back, Stoney Woodson of South Carolina with pick 238.

2009 New York Giants Draft
Round	Selection	Player	Position	College	Notes
1	29	Hakeem Nicks	WR	North Carolina	
2	45	Clint Sintim	LB	Virginia	
2	60	William Beatty	OT	Connecticut	
3	85	Ramses Barden	WR	Cal Poly-S.L.O.	
3	100	Travis Beckum	TE	Wisconsin	Compensatory pick
4	129	Andre Brown	RB	North Carolina State	
5	151	Rhett Bomar	QB	Sam Houston State	
6	200	DeAndre Wright	CB	New Mexico	
7	238	Stoney Woodson	CB	South Carolina	

NOTES:

- Pick 100 is a compensatory selection awarded by the league.
- The Giants received the second and fifth-round selections of the New Orleans Saints for tight end Jeremy Shockey.
- The Giants traded Pick 91, Round 3 and Pick 164, Round 5 to Philadelphia for Pick 85, Round 3.

==== Undrafted free agents ====
Following the 2009 NFL Draft, the Giants signed 9 undrafted free agents. They were:

- SS Vince Anderson (Webber International)
- C Alex Derenthal (Temple University)
- DE Maurice Evans (Penn State)
- DE Alex Field (Virginia)
- DT Dwayne Hendricks (Miami)
- DE Tommie Hill (Colorado State)
- OLB Kenny Ingram (Florida State)
- CB Bruce Johnson (Miami)
- FS Sha'reff Rashad (Central Florida)

=== Training Camp Roster ===
2009 New York Giants training camp roster
Quarterbacks: 5 Rhett Bomar; 8 David Carr; 10 Eli Manning; 3 Andre' Woodson; Running backs: 44 Ahmad Bradshaw; 22 Andre Brown; 39 Madison Hedgecock FB; 27 Brandon Jacobs; 28 DJ Ware; 30 Dwayne Wright; Wide receivers: 13 Ramses Barden; 19 Taye Biddle; 2 Shaun Bodiford RS; 80 Derek Hagan; 87 Domenik Hixon RS; 82 Mario Manningham; 83 Sinorice Moss; 18 Hakeem Nicks; 12 Steve Smith; 85 David Tyree; Tight ends: 47 Travis Beckum; 89 Kevin Boss; 84 Darcy Johnson; 88 Michael Matthews; 86 Martez Milner; 49 Lee Vickers; 48 George Wrighster	Offensive linemen: 65 William Beatty T; 77 Kevin Boothe G; 62 Andrew Carnahan T; 66 David Diehl T; 61 Adam Koets C; 67 Kareem McKenzie T; 60 Shaun O'Hara C; 74 Terrence Pennington T; 69 Rich Seubert G; 76 Chris Snee G; 79 Guy Whimper T; Defensive linemen: 93 Jay Alford DT; 95 Rocky Bernard DT; 75 Anthony Bryant DT; 99 Chris Canty DT; 73 Jeremy Clark DT; 96 Barry Cofield DT; 78 Douzable Leger DT; 90 Robert Henderson DE; 97 Mathias Kiwanuka DE; 98 Fred Robbins DT; 71 Dave Tollefson DE; 91 Justin Tuck DE; 72 Osi Umenyiora DE	Linebackers: 57 Chase Blackburn; 52 Michael Boley OLB; 55 Danny Clark OLB; 51 Zak DeOssie OLB/LS; 54 Jonathan Goff ILB; 53 Bryan Kehl OLB; 58 Antonio Pierce ILB; 97 Clint Sintim OLB; 48 Kelvin Smith ILB; 59 Gerris Wilkinson OLB; Defensive backs: 33 Rashad Barksdale CB; 41 C. C. Brown SS; 38 Steve Cargile S; 35 Kevin Dockery CB; 20 Michael Johnson FS; 21 Kenny Phillips S; 31 Aaron Ross CB; 24 Terrell Thomas CB; 23 Corey Webster CB; 29 Stoney Woodson CB; 26 DeAndre White CB; Special teams: 18 Jeff Feagles P; 9 Lawrence Tynes

=== Final roster ===
2009 New York Giants roster
Quarterbacks (QB): 5 Rhett Bomar; 8 David Carr; 10 Eli Manning; Running backs (RB): 44 Ahmad Bradshaw; 39 Madison Hedgecock; 33 Gartrell Johnson; 28 DJ Ware; Wide receivers (WR): 13 Ramses Barden; 80 Derek Hagan; 87 Domenik Hixon RS; 82 Mario Manningham; 83 Sinorice Moss; 88 Hakeem Nicks; 12 Steve Smith; Tight ends (TE): 47 Travis Beckum; 89 Kevin Boss; 85 Scott Chandler; 86 Bear Pascoe	Offensive linemen (OL): 65 Will Beatty T; 77 Kevin Boothe G; 66 David Diehl T; 61 Adam Koets C; 67 Kareem McKenzie T; 60 Shaun O'Hara C; 69 Rich Seubert G; 76 Chris Snee G; 79 Guy Whimper T; Defensive linemen (DL): 95 Rocky Bernard DT; 99 Chris Canty DT; 96 Barry Cofield DT; 94 Mathias Kiwanuka DE; 98 Fred Robbins DT; 71 Dave Tollefson DE; 91 Justin Tuck DE; 72 Osi Umenyiora DE	Linebackers (LB): 57 Chase Blackburn MLB; 52 Michael Boley OLB; 55 Danny Clark OLB; 54 Jonathan Goff MLB; 53 Bryan Kehl OLB; 97 Clint Sintim OLB; Defensive backs (DB): 41 C. C. Brown FS/SS; 35 Kevin Dockery CB; 25 Bruce Johnson CB; 29 D. J. Johnson CB/S; 20 Michael Johnson FS/SS; 30 Sha'reff Rashad FS; 26 Aaron Rouse FS; 24 Terrell Thomas CB; 23 Corey Webster CB; Special teams (ST): 51 Zak DeOssie LS; 18 Jeff Feagles P; 9 Lawrence Tynes K	Practice squad: 45 Vince Anderson S (IR); 78 Jacob Bender G; 36 Nehemiah Broughton FB; 75 Anthony Bryant DT (IR); 73 Jeremy Clark DT; 19 Bruce Francis WR; 34 Londen Fryar CB; 74 Dwayne Hendricks DT; 43 Kenny Ingram LB; 64 Rueben Riley G; Reserve: 93 Jay Alford DT (IR); 22 Andre Brown RB (IR); 27 Brandon Jacobs RB (IR); 84 Darcy Johnson TE (IR); 58 Antonio Pierce LB (IR); 21 Kenny Phillips S (IR); 31 Aaron Ross CB (IR); 59 Gerris Wilkinson LB (IR); Rookies in italics 53 active, 10 reserve, 8 practice squad

== Staff ==
=== Staff changes ===
- On January 19, 2009, after 4 years as linebackers coach, the Giants promoted Bill Sheridan to defensive coordinator as replacement to Steve Spagnuolo who was hired by the St. Louis Rams as their new head coach two days earlier.
- On January 22, 2009, the Giants hired Jim Herrmann as new linebackers coach. He spent the last three years at the same position in the New York Jets. Herrmann is the replacement of Bill Sheridan, who was promoted to defensive coordinator.
- On January 23, 2009, the Giants hired Jack Bicknell, Jr. as new assistant offensive line coach. He spent the last two years as offensive line coach for Boston College. Bicknell succeeds Dave DeGuglielmo, coach between 2005 and 2008, who left the Giants to become the new offensive line coach of the Miami Dolphins.
- On February 9, 2009, the Giants hired Al Holcomb as the new defensive quality control coach. He spent the last three years as defensive line coach in the Lafayette College. Holcomb succeeds Andre Curtis, who left the Giants to become the new safeties coach in the staff of Steve Spagnuolo at the St. Louis Rams.

=== Staff ===
2009 New York Giants staff
Front office: President/CEO – John Mara; Chairman/executive vice president – Steve Tisch; Senior vice president/general manager – Jerry Reese; Vice president of player evaluation – Chris Mara; Assistant general manager – Kevin Abrams; Director of pro personnel – David Gettleman; Assistant director of pro personnel – Ken Sternfeld; Director of college scouting – Marc Ross; Head coaches: Head coach – Tom Coughlin; Offensive coaches: Offensive coordinator – Kevin Gilbride; Quarterbacks – Chris Palmer; Running backs – Jerald Ingram; Wide receivers – Mike Sullivan; Tight ends – Mike Pope; Offensive line – Pat Flaherty; Asst. offensive line – Jack Bicknell, Jr.; Offensive quality control – Sean Ryan	Defensive coaches: Defensive coordinator – Bill Sheridan; Defensive line – Mike Waufle; Linebackers – Jim Herrmann; Secondary/corners – Peter Giunta; Secondary/safeties – David Merritt; Defensive quality control – Al Holcomb; Special team coaches: Special teams coordinator – Tom Quinn; Assistant special teams – Thomas McGaughey; Strength and conditioning: Strength and conditioning – Jerry Palmieri; Assistant strength and conditioning – Markus Paul

== Schedule ==
=== Preseason ===
Week	Date	Opponent	Result	Record	Venue	Recap
1	August 17	Carolina Panthers	W 24–17	1–0	Giants Stadium	Recap
2	August 22	at Chicago Bears	L 3–17	1–1	Soldier Field	Recap
3	August 29	New York Jets	L 25–27	1–2	Giants Stadium	Recap
4	September 3	at New England Patriots	L 27–38	1–3	Gillette Stadium	Recap

=== Regular season ===
Week	Date	Opponent	Result	Record	Venue	Recap
1	September 13	Washington Redskins	W 23–17	1–0	Giants Stadium	Recap
2	September 20	at Dallas Cowboys	W 33–31	2–0	Cowboys Stadium	Recap
3	September 27	at Tampa Bay Buccaneers	W 24–0	3–0	Raymond James Stadium	Recap
4	October 4	at Kansas City Chiefs	W 27–16	4–0	Arrowhead Stadium	Recap
5	October 11	Oakland Raiders	W 44–7	5–0	Giants Stadium	Recap
6	October 18	at New Orleans Saints	L 27–48	5–1	Louisiana Superdome	Recap
7	October 25	Arizona Cardinals	L 17–24	5–2	Giants Stadium	Recap
8	November 1	at Philadelphia Eagles	L 17–40	5–3	Lincoln Financial Field	Recap
9	November 8	San Diego Chargers	L 20–21	5–4	Giants Stadium	Recap
10	Bye					
11	November 22	Atlanta Falcons	W 34–31 (OT)	6–4	Giants Stadium	Recap
12	November 26	at Denver Broncos	L 6–26	6–5	Invesco Field at Mile High	Recap
13	December 6	Dallas Cowboys	W 31–24	7–5	Giants Stadium	Recap
14	December 13	Philadelphia Eagles	L 38–45	7–6	Giants Stadium	Recap
15	December 21	at Washington Redskins	W 45–12	8–6	FedExField	Recap
16	December 27	Carolina Panthers	L 9–41	8–7	Giants Stadium	Recap
17	January 3	at Minnesota Vikings	L 7–44	8–8	Hubert H. Humphrey Metrodome	Recap

== Standings ==
NFC East
	W	L	T	PCT	DIV	CONF	PF	PA	STK
^{(3)} Dallas Cowboys	11	5	0	.688	4–2	9–3	361	250	W3
^{(6)} Philadelphia Eagles	11	5	0	.688	4–2	9–3	429	337	L1
New York Giants	8	8	0	.500	4–2	6–6	402	427	L2
Washington Redskins	4	12	0	.250	0–6	2–10	266	336	L3

== Regular season results ==
=== Week 1: vs. Washington Redskins ===
Quarter	1	2	3	4	Total
Redskins	0	7	3	7	17
Giants	3	14	0	6	23

at Giants Stadium, East Rutherford, New Jersey

- Game time: 4:15 pm EDT
- Game weather: 80 °F (27 °C), Sunny
- Game attendance: 78,206
- Referee: Terry McAulay
- TV announcers (Fox): Joe Buck, Troy Aikman, & Pam Oliver

The Giants' season began on a down note, as punt returner/running back DJ Ware dislocated his elbow returning the opening kickoff. The injury bug would later notably strike first-round draft pick Hakeem Nicks, who suffered a sprained foot in the fourth quarter and was carted off the field.

Wide receiver Mario Manningham caught the game's first touchdown in the second quarter; the 30-yard strike was worth more yardage than Manningham had totalled in the entire 2008 season. Later in the quarter, Giants defensive end Osi Umenyiora returned a Jason Campbell fumble 37 yards for a touchdown, his first major play since returning from the knee injury that benched him for all of 2008. Just before halftime, Redskins punter Hunter Smith ran a fake field goal into the end zone to bring the halftime score to 17–7. The Giants did not score a touchdown in the second half, but two Lawrence Tynes field goals ensured that Campbell's late touchdown pass to Chris Cooley would not spoil the Giants' final home opener at Giants Stadium.

The victory served as a sort of going-away party for the Giants, who now faced a rare three-game roadtrip for the first time since 1994.

=== Week 2: at Dallas Cowboys ===
Quarter	1	2	3	4	Total
Giants	10	10	0	13	33
Cowboys	7	10	7	7	31

at Cowboys Stadium, Arlington, Texas

- Game time: 8:20 pm EDT
- Game weather: 84 °F (29 °C), Partly Cloudy
- Game attendance: 105,121
- Referee: Mike Carey
- TV announcers (NBC): Al Michaels, Cris Collinsworth, & Andrea Kremer

In contrast to the teams' previous meeting, the grand opening of Cowboys Stadium (in front of the largest regular-season crowd in NFL history) was a fast-paced shootout. The first points in the Cowboys' new home were scored by Tynes, whose 30-yard field goal in the first quarter was his first of four on the night. The Cowboys responded by scoring their first points on the ensuing drive—a 2-yard run by running back Marion Barber.

Giants rookie cornerback Bruce Johnson scored his first career points returning a Tony Romo interception 34 yards. Cowboys tight end Jason Witten responded with a 1-yard touchdown pass in the second quarter. Later, Giants safety Kenny Phillips caught an odd interception off Witten's foot, setting up quarterback Eli Manning's 100th career touchdown pass—a 22-yard strike to Manningham. Romo ran a quarterback sneak to open the scoring in the second half, but the Giants sent wide receiver Steve Smith into the end zone in the fourth quarter. The Cowboys punched in one more touchdown on a 7-yard Felix Jones run, but Tynes' 37-yard field goal as time expired was enough to postpone the Cowboys' first home win in Arlington and boost the Giants to 2–0.

The Giants lost two more notable players to injuries; defensive end Justin Tuck suffered a sprained shoulder and wide receiver Domenik Hixon sprained a knee. During the week, Phillips' season was brought to an end, as he was placed on injured reserve with patellofemoral arthritis.

=== Week 3: at Tampa Bay Buccaneers ===
Quarter	1	2	3	4	Total
Giants	7	7	3	7	24
Buccaneers	0	0	0	0	0

at Raymond James Stadium, Tampa, Florida

- Game time: 1:00 pm EDT
- Game weather: 88 °F (31 °C), Cloudy
- Game attendance: 63,689
- Referee: Jeff Triplette
- TV announcers (Fox): Kenny Albert, Daryl Johnston, & Tony Siragusa

Playing in hot, humid Florida weather, the Giants scored on their first possession for the third week in a row. Jacobs' 6-yard run was also the Giants' first red zone touchdown in eight trips this year. After that, the Giants never looked back. They held the Buccaneers to 18 total yards of offense and 0 first downs in the first half. Smith contributed with a 4-yard touchdown catch on the first play of the second quarter. In the fourth quarter, Sinorice Moss' first reception of the year was good for an 18-yard touchdown. The game ended with David Carr at quarterback for the Giants and Josh Johnson relieving Tampa Bay quarterback Byron Leftwich, whom the Giants' defense held to just 22 passing yards on the day. The Giants had pitched their first shutout on the road since 1983.

=== Week 4: at Kansas City Chiefs ===
Quarter	1	2	3	4	Total
Giants	7	10	3	7	27
Chiefs	3	0	0	13	16

at Arrowhead Stadium, Kansas City, Missouri

- Game time: 1:00 pm EDT
- Game weather: 59 °F (15 °C), Sunny
- Game attendance: 69,238
- Referee: Jerome Boger
- TV announcers (Fox): Kenny Albert, Daryl Johnston, & Tony Siragusa

The Giants were in control of the winless Chiefs from the opening kickoff, which Bryan Kehl recovered after a Jamaal Charles fumble. The Giants proceeded to score on their first possession for the fourth straight week, this time on a short pass to Smith. Smith himself went on to have a busy day, with 11 catches for 134 yards and a 25-yard touchdown in the second quarter as well. Nicks returned from his Week 1 injury and scored his first career touchdown, a 54-yard pass from Manning, in the fourth quarter. Late in the game, the Chiefs put up a brief flurry of offense; quarterback Matt Cassel threw touchdowns to tight end Sean Ryan and wide receiver Bobby Wade within a span of about five minutes. But the comeback fell short, and the Giants improved to 4–0.

Manning suffered a heel injury in the fourth quarter, and was forced to leave the game early. Initially concerned about a possible Achilles tendon injury, he was later diagnosed with plantar fasciitis; his start against the Raiders was to be a game-time decision.

=== Week 5: vs. Oakland Raiders ===
Quarter	1	2	3	4	Total
Raiders	0	7	0	0	7
Giants	14	17	10	3	44

at Giants Stadium, East Rutherford, New Jersey

- Game time: 1:00 pm EDT
- Game weather: 61 °F (16 °C), Sunny
- Game attendance: 79,012
- Referee: John Parry
- TV announcers (CBS): Greg Gumbel & Dan Dierdorf

Manning ended up playing until late in the second quarter before handing over the reins—and another Giants blowout lead—to Carr. The Giants extended their first-possession scoring streak to five games, sending Ahmad Bradshaw into the end zone for his first touchdown of the year. The Giants proceeded to score touchdowns on each of their next three drives as well: Bradshaw scored again on a 19-yard rush; Manningham caught a 30-yard touchdown pass to open the second quarter; and, following a red zone fumble by Oakland quarterback JaMarcus Russell, Nicks added a 9-yard touchdown reception. In the third quarter, Carr himself ran 12 yards for his first rushing touchdown since leaving the Houston Texans. The Raiders were held to just 7 first downs on the day, their only touchdown coming on the heels of a muffed punt by Moss.

The win handed the Giants their first 5–0 start since their Super Bowl-winning year of 1990.

=== Week 6: at New Orleans Saints ===
Quarter	1	2	3	4	Total
Giants	3	14	0	10	27
Saints	14	20	7	7	48

at Louisiana Superdome, New Orleans, Louisiana

- Game time: 1:00 pm EDT
- Game weather: None (Dome)
- Game attendance: 70,011
- Referee: Ed Hochuli
- TV announcers (Fox): Thom Brennaman, Troy Aikman, & Pam Oliver

The Giants' first loss of the year came in this much-anticipated "clash of unbeatens" against a 4–0 New Orleans team. Manning's first NFL game in his hometown of New Orleans was also Saints tight end Jeremy Shockey's first game against his former team.

The Giants' defense, which entered the game as the best in the NFL, gave up 493 total yards and 7 touchdowns to seven different Saints, including Shockey. Scoring touchdowns for the Giants were: Bradshaw, on a 10-yard run in the second quarter; Manningham, who caught a 15-yard pass later in the quarter; and Nicks, whose 37-yard reception from Carr earned him his first career 100-yard receiving game. But the Giants were unable to overcome their highest-scoring opponent since 1999.

=== Week 7: vs. Arizona Cardinals ===
Quarter	1	2	3	4	Total
Cardinals	0	10	14	0	24
Giants	0	14	0	3	17

at Giants Stadium, East Rutherford, New Jersey

- Game time: 8:20 pm EDT
- Game weather: 57 °F (14 °C), Clear
- Game attendance: 78,299
- Referee: Alberto Riveron
- TV announcers (NBC): Al Michaels, Cris Collinsworth, & Andrea Kremer

Led by former Giant Kurt Warner, the defending NFC champions took the field at Giants Stadium against a Giants team still reeling from their bad loss in New Orleans. The Giants scored first, sending Jacobs in for a 4-yard touchdown run following a Terrell Thomas interception. Later, Arizona running back Beanie Wells scored his first career touchdown on a 13-yard rush. Manning responded by throwing a 62-yard touchdown to Nicks for his longest reception of the year. In the second half, the Cardinals' Tim Hightower and Jason Wright scored touchdowns. But it was turnovers that decided this game; Manning's 3 interceptions were as many as he had thrown all season. The Giants scored only 3 points in the second half, ending the game on an interception to Antrel Rolle.

The Giants notable streak of 38 consecutive starts by the same offensive line unit was ended here, as offensive tackle Kareem McKenzie missed the game with a groin injury. McKenzie returned the following week.

With the loss, The Giants fell to 5–2.

=== Week 8: at Philadelphia Eagles ===
Quarter	1	2	3	4	Total
Giants	0	7	10	0	17
Eagles	13	17	3	7	40

at Lincoln Financial Field, Philadelphia, Pennsylvania

- Game time: 1:00 pm EST
- Game weather: 56 °F (13 °C), Cloudy
- Game attendance: 69,144
- Referee: Carl Cheffers
- TV announcers (Fox): Kenny Albert, Daryl Johnston, & Tony Siragusa

This game was originally scheduled at 4:15 pm; however, because the Philadelphia Phillies were hosting Game 4 of the World Series that night the NFL moved the start time to 1:00 pm.

Trying to end a two-game losing streak, the Giants went into Lincoln Financial Field for a crucial Week 8 game with the Philadelphia Eagles, as the divisional lead was up for grabs.

New York trailed greatly in the first quarter as Eagles fullback Leonard Weaver got a 41-yard touchdown run, followed by quarterback Donovan McNabb's 17-yard touchdown pass to tight end Brent Celek (with a blocked PAT). Philadelphia would add onto their lead in the second quarter with a 30-yard field goal from kicker David Akers. The Giants would get on the board as quarterback Eli Manning found tight end Kevin Boss on an 18-yard touchdown pass, but the Eagles continued their scoring as McNabb completed a 54-yard touchdown pass to wide receiver DeSean Jackson and a 23-yard touchdown pass to wide receiver Jeremy Maclin.

Philadelphia would begin the third quarter with an increase to their lead as Akers nailed a 35-yard field goal. New York tried to rally as kicker Lawrence Tynes booted a 35-yard field goal, followed by running back Ahmad Bradshaw. However, the Eagles would seal the win in the fourth quarter as running back LeSean McCoy got a 66-yard touchdown run.

With their third-straight loss, the Giants fell to 5–3.

=== Week 9: vs. San Diego Chargers ===
Quarter	1	2	3	4	Total
Chargers	0	7	7	7	21
Giants	0	7	0	13	20

at Giants Stadium, East Rutherford, NJ

- Game time: 4:15 pm EST
- Game weather: 71 °F (22 °C), Sunny
- Game attendance: 78,774
- Referee: Walt Anderson
- TV announcers (CBS): Jim Nantz & Phil Simms
- Game Book

Game information

- SD – Vincent Jackson 10-yard pass from Philip Rivers (Nate Kaeding kick)
- NYG – Steve Smith 6-yard pass from Eli Manning (Lawrence Tynes kick)
- SD – Kris Wilson 2-yard pass from Philip Rivers (Nate Kaeding kick)
- NYG – Lawrence Tynes 38-yard field goal
- NYG – Kevin Boss 8-yard pass from Eli Manning (Lawrence Tynes kick)
- NYG – Lawrence Tynes 22-yard field goal
- SD – Vincent Jackson 18-yard pass from Philip Rivers (Nate Kaeding kick)

Passing

- SD – Philip Rivers 24/36, 209 yards, 2 INT
- NYG – Eli Manning 25/33, 215 yards

Rushing

- SD – LaDainian Tomlinson 12–22, Philip Rivers 1–15, Darren Sproles 1–1, Vincent Jackson 1-(−4)
- NYG – Brandon Jacobs 11–67, Ahmad Bradshaw 14–39, Danny Ware 2–9, Hakeem Nicks 1–9, Jeff Feagles 1-(−8)

Receiving

- SD – Antonio Gates 5–67, Vincent Jackson 5–58, Malcom Floyd 3–29, Darren Sproles 5–22, Legedu Naanee 3–20, LaDainian Tomlinson 2–8, Jacob Hester 1–3, Kris Wilson 1–2
- NYG – Steve Smith 8–57, Mario Manningham 6–52, Hakeem Nicks 3–39, Ahmad Bradshaw 3–27, Kevin Boss 2–17, Darcy Johnson 1–14, Domenik Hixon 1–8, Brandon Jacobs 1–1

Defense

- SD – Stephen Cooper 13 tackles, Shaun Phillips 1.0 sack, 2 Forced Fum, Jacques Cesaire 1.0 sack, Shawne Merriman 2.0 sacks, Fum Rec, Alfonso Boone 1.0 sack
- NYG – Terrell Thomas 9 tackles, INT, Fred Robbins 1.0 sack, Osi Umenyiora 1.0 sack, Forced Fum

Scoring summary

Quarter	Time	Drive			Team	Scoring information	Score	
Quarter	Time	Plays	Yards	TOP	Team	Scoring information	Chargers	Giants
2	14:55		45	3:04	Chargers	Vincent Jackson 10-yard touchdown reception from Philip Rivers, Nate Kaeding kick good	7	0
2	4:20		76	10:35	Giants	Steve Smith 6-yard touchdown reception from Eli Manning, Lawrence Tynes kick good	7	7
3	3:51		51	3:03	Chargers	Kris Wilson 2-yard touchdown reception from Philip Rivers, Nate Kaeding kick good	14	7
4	14:09		60	4:42	Giants	38-yard field goal by Lawrence Tynes	14	10
4	8:58		39	3:25	Giants	Kevin Boss 8-yard touchdown reception from Eli Manning, Lawrence Tynes kick good	14	17
4	22		0	1:07	Giants	22-yard field goal by Lawrence Tynes	14	20
4	:21		80	1:46	Chargers	Vincent Jackson 18-yard touchdown reception from Philip Rivers, Nate Kaeding kick good	21	20
"TOP" = time of possession. For other American football terms, see Glossary of American football.							21	20

This game was the much-hyped first-ever meeting between Manning and Philip Rivers, the two quarterbacks drafted, then traded, during the 2004 NFL draft.

The Chargers struck first, as Rivers connected with Vincent Jackson in the end zone to open the second quarter. Manning responded with a 6-yard touchdown pass to Smith that capped off a 16-play, 10:35 drive. In the third quarter, Rivers found tight end Kris Wilson in the end zone for Wilson's first touchdown since 2007. The Giants responded with a Tynes field goal and then an 8-yard touchdown to Boss. After a defensive stop by the Chargers that held the Giants to a field goal from the 4-yard line, Rivers led his team 80 yards in the final two minutes and threw Jackson the winning score with twenty-one seconds remaining on the clock. The Giants had lost despite controlling the ball for 37:47 and holding the Chargers to 34 rushing yards.

The 5–4 Giants had dropped four straight for the first time since 2006, and headed into their bye week.

=== Week 11: vs. Atlanta Falcons ===
Quarter	1	2	3	4	OT	Total
Falcons	0	7	10	14	0	31
Giants	3	14	7	7	3	34

at Giants Stadium, East Rutherford, New Jersey

- Game time: 1:00 pm EST
- Game weather: 53 °F (12 °C), Sunny
- Game attendance: 78,491
- Referee: Gene Steratore
- TV announcers (Fox): Kenny Albert, Daryl Johnston, & Tony Siragusa

The Giants had not beaten the Falcons at home in five tries since 1979, but it was a must-win game this time. The Giants were missing veteran linebacker Antonio Pierce, who was nursing a bulging disc in his neck, and the Falcons' star running back Michael Turner was also out with a high ankle sprain.

The Giants took an early lead on Tynes' first-quarter field goal, but the Falcons responded with third-string running back Jason Snelling's 7-yard touchdown run. Boss caught two touchdown passes in the second quarter, one of them from 28 yards out. In the third quarter, Snelling and Jacobs traded short touchdown runs. Giants fullback Madison Hedgecock opened the scoring in the fourth quarter by catching his first touchdown of the season, but Falcons receiver Eric Weems caught his second of the year on the ensuing drive. In a sort of déjà vu moment for the Giants, another opponent's comeback took them right up until the final minute; tight end Tony Gonzalez caught the tying touchdown with 35 seconds left in regulation. The Giants won the overtime coin toss, and then drove 45 yards to set up Tynes' winning field goal, ending the Giants' skid at 4 games.

=== Week 12: at Denver Broncos ===
Quarter	1	2	3	4	Total
Giants	0	0	6	0	6
Broncos	3	13	0	10	26

at INVESCO Field at Mile High, Denver, Colorado

- Game time: 8:20 pm EST
- Game weather: 57 °F (14 °C), Mostly Clear
- Game attendance: 74,896
- Referee: Tony Corrente
- TV announcers (NFLN): Bob Papa & Matt Millen

Coming off their overtime win to the Falcons, the Giants flew for a Week 12 interconference game against the Denver Broncos, their first Thanksgiving game since 1992.

In the first quarter the Giants trailed early with kicker Matt Prater making a 26-yard field goal and then a 32-yard field goal in the second quarter. The Broncos kept on top with RB Knowshon Moreno making a 1-yard touchdown run. After that Matt Prater made a 47-yard field goal to end the half. In the third quarter the Giants replied with kicker Lawrence Tynes nailing a 39 then a 52-yard field goal. In the fourth quarter New York fell further behind with QB Kyle Orton making a 17-yard touchdown pass to WR Brandon Stokley, and Prater making a 24-yard field goal.

With the loss, the Giants fell to 6–5.

=== Week 13: vs. Dallas Cowboys ===
Quarter	1	2	3	4	Total
Cowboys	0	10	7	7	24
Giants	0	14	7	10	31

at Giants Stadium, East Rutherford, New Jersey

- Game time: 4:15 pm EST
- Game weather: 37 °F (3 °C), Clear
- Game attendance: 79,244
- Referee: Bill Leavy
- TV announcers (Fox): Joe Buck, Troy Aikman, & Pam Oliver

The rematch of these division rivals was a must-win game for the Giants in a season where every game was quickly becoming a must-win game for the Giants. A win would keep alive the Giants' hopes of winning the NFC East.

Dallas receiver Roy Williams scored the game's first touchdown in the second quarter, on a 4-yard pass from Romo. Manning responded with a 21-yard shot to Nicks on the ensuing drive. On the Cowboys' next possession, Umenyiora picked up a Marion Barber fumble, which Jacobs later turned into a 1-yard touchdown run. In the third quarter, Romo found Williams in the end zone again, this time for 5 yards. But on the next play from scrimmage, Jacobs caught a 74-yard touchdown for the longest reception of his career. Another Giant set a personal record in the fourth quarter; Hixon's 79-yard punt return was the longest of his career, and it resulted in his second career return touchdown. In a late rally by the Cowboys, Miles Austin caught a 22-yard touchdown pass from Romo, but the ensuing onside kick resulted in a penalty on Sam Hurd for illegal touching and the Giants ran out the clock. The Giants had swept the Cowboys for the first time since 2004, and were now only one game behind in the division standings.

=== Week 14: vs. Philadelphia Eagles ===
Quarter	1	2	3	4	Total
Eagles	14	16	7	8	45
Giants	3	14	14	7	38

at Giants Stadium, East Rutherford, New Jersey

- Game time: 8:20 pm EST
- Game weather: 42 °F (6 °C), Cloudy
- Game attendance: 78,780
- Referee: John Parry
- TV announcers (NBC): Al Michaels, Cris Collinsworth, & Andrea Kremer

The winner of this Sunday Night showdown would assume first place in the NFC East (the Eagles outright, the Giants on tiebreakers). With two games against opponents with losing records approaching, it was crucial for the Giants to escape this one with a win.

The Eagles started things off right away, putting 14 points on the board before the Giants had run their fifth play from scrimmage. McNabb connected with Celek for a touchdown, and Sheldon Brown returned a Brandon Jacobs fumble for six points on the ensuing drive. In the second quarter, Nicks caught the longest reception of his short career for a 68-yard touchdown. After DeSean Jackson responded by returning a Jeff Feagles punt 72 yards for a touchdown, the Giants were able to send Bradshaw into the end zone from the 3. Eagles backup quarterback Michael Vick was able to sneak in one more rushing touchdown before halftime. Jacobs opened the scoring in the second half with a 1-yard rush. After the teams traded turnovers, Manning got the ball into Hixon's hands for a 61-yard touchdown. But the Eagles responded on the very next play with a 60-yard touchdown to Jackson. Jackson's 176 receiving yards amounted to the best individual receiving performance against the Giants since 2002. The Eagles struck again in the fourth quarter, this time on a run by fullback Leonard Weaver and a two-point conversion pass to Jason Avant. The Giants put another touchdown on the board (courtesy of Boss) in the last two minutes of the game, and got the ball back with 28 seconds left. But defensive end Darren Howard sacked Manning and forced a fumble, sealing the Eagles' first sweep of the Giants since 2004.

The Giants had given up 85 points to the Eagles this year, the most they had ever given up to the Eagles in a single season in franchise history, including four playoff years where they met the Eagles a third time. The Giants' 38 points were also the most scored by a losing team since Week 2 of 2008.

=== Week 15: at Washington Redskins ===
Quarter	1	2	3	4	Total
Giants	7	17	14	7	45
Redskins	0	0	12	0	12

at FedExField, Landover, Maryland

- Game time: 8:30 pm EST
- Game weather: 38 °F (3 °C), Cloudy
- Game attendance: 78,359
- Referee: Walt Coleman
- TV announcers (ESPN): Mike Tirico, Ron Jaworski, & Jon Gruden

The Giants needed wins to keep their playoff hopes alive, and this Monday night matchup against the Redskins seemed like an opportunity.

The Giants' first two possessions ended in touchdown runs by Bradshaw of 3 and 4 yards. Later in the second quarter, Manning found Smith in the end zone for a 6-yard score. The normally-lackluster Giants defense succeeded in holding the Redskins to 2 first downs and no points in the first half. The Redskins opened the scoring in the second half with an 11-yard touchdown strike from Campbell to tight end Fred Davis, but Graham Gano's extra point was blocked by Fred Robbins. Manning responded by throwing receiver Derek Hagan his first touchdown as a Giant, a 23-yard pass. On the next play from scrimmage, Thomas intercepted a Campbell pass and returned it 14 yards for a touchdown. Quinton Ganther, starting at running back in place of the injured Clinton Portis, gave the Redskins another touchdown late in the third quarter, but could not get into the end zone on the two-point conversion attempt. Manning threw one more touchdown pass to Manningham in the fourth quarter, which boosted the Giants to their highest point total on the road since 1954. The Giants were still very much in the playoff picture, and hoping for losses by the Cowboys and Packers.

=== Week 16: vs. Carolina Panthers ===
Quarter	1	2	3	4	Total
Panthers	3	21	10	7	41
Giants	0	0	3	6	9

at Giants Stadium, East Rutherford, New Jersey

- Game time: 1:00 pm EST
- Game weather: 50 °F (10 °C), Sunny
- Game attendance: 78,809
- Referee: Scott Green
- TV announcers (Fox): Joe Buck, Troy Aikman, & Pam Oliver

This was the last game the Giants would ever play at the moribund Giants Stadium.

The Panthers, starting Matt Moore at quarterback in place of the injured Jake Delhomme, quickly took control of the game, scoring on their first four possessions (a 38-yard John Kasay field goal; a 29-yard Jonathan Stewart touchdown run; a 22-yard Muhsin Muhammad touchdown catch; and a 2-yard catch for tight end Jeff King). Meanwhile, the Giants turned the ball over 3 times in the first half, and were shut out at halftime for the second time this season. In the third quarter, Carolina picked up where they left off, as Moore connected with Carolina's Steve Smith for a 27-yard score. The Giants finally got on the board on the ensuing drive, courtesy of a 40-yard Tynes field goal. In the fourth quarter, the Giants' Smith caught a 2-yard touchdown pass from Manning, but a subsequent 2-point try failed. Carolina fullback Brad Hoover's 1-yard scoring run later in the fourth sealed the game for the Panthers. The Giants left Giants Stadium the same way they had opened it 33 years earlier; with a demoralizing loss.

The loss, along with wins by the Cowboys and Packers this week, mathematically eliminated the Giants from the postseason, breaking their streak of 4 consecutive playoff appearances. Curiously, the last NFL game at Giants Stadium would not be a Giants game, but a Jets game; the Jets would play the Cincinnati Bengals at home on Sunday night in Week 17.

=== Week 17: at Minnesota Vikings ===
Quarter	1	2	3	4	Total
Giants	0	0	0	7	7
Vikings	7	24	13	0	44

at Hubert H. Humphrey Metrodome, Minneapolis, Minnesota

- Game time: 1:00 pm EST
- Game weather: None (Dome)
- Game attendance: 63,854
- Referee: Terry McAulay
- TV announcers (Fox): Kenny Albert, Daryl Johnston, & Tony Siragusa

The Giants wrapped up their 2009 campaign against Brett Favre, a quarterback they last saw on their way to Super Bowl XLII. This time, however, Favre led a convincing rout of the Giants, as they allowed 40 points to an opponent for the fifth time this season. Scoring touchdowns for Minnesota were former Giant Visanthe Shiancoe, Pro Bowlers Adrian Peterson and Sidney Rice (twice), and fullback Naufahu Tahi. A 1-yard touchdown run by Ware in the fourth quarter prevented the Giants from being shut out. Center Shaun O'Hara was named to the Pro Bowl in the week leading up to the game.

The 2009 Giants became the eighth team since the 1970 AFL-NFL merger to miss the playoffs after starting the season 5–0, and the first NFC team since the Vikings in 2003.
