= Holcomb (surname) =

Origin
- Meaning: "from (a place called) Holcombe"; Anglo-Saxon origin
- Region of origin: Devon and other English counties

Other names
- Variant forms: Holcombe, Halcombe and other variant spellings

Holcomb is a surname, originating in a number of English villages with the name Holcombe. Early examples are recorded as de Holcombe, and the final e has been dropped from many family names, particularly in the USA. Notable people with the surname Holcomb include:

- Al Holcomb, American football coach
- Amasa Holcomb, American farmer, surveyor, civil engineer, businessman, and manufacturer of surveying instruments
- Benjamin Harrison Holcomb, American, one-time oldest living man
- Bob Holcomb, American politician and attorney
- Bobby Holcomb, American artist and musician
- Charles Holcomb, American judge
- Charlie Holcomb, American-born English cricketer
- Cole Holcomb, American football player
- Corey Holcomb, American stand-up comedian, radio host, and actor
- David Holcomb, American State Senator from Ohio
- Doug Holcomb, American basketball player
- Drew Holcomb, American singer and songwriter
- Eric Holcomb, American politician, Governor of Indiana
- Jeff Holcomb, American politician from Florida
- John Noble Holcomb, American soldier
- Kelly Holcomb, American football player
- Marcus H. Holcomb, American politician and Governor of Connecticut
- Mark Holcomb, American guitarist and songwriter, Periphery
- Mike Holcomb, American Christian singer
- Randy Holcomb, American basketball player
- Richard Holcomb, American commercial sex worker specialist, street outreach worker and HIV prevention counselor
- Robin Holcomb, American singer, songwriter and pianist
- Rod Holcomb, American television director and producer
- Roscoe Holcomb, American musician
- Sarah Holcomb, American actress
- Silas A. Holcomb, American lawyer and politician
- Steven Holcomb (1980–2017), American bobsled driver
- Stu Holcomb, American college football coach
- Thomas Holcomb, Commandant of the US Marine Corps
- William F. Holcomb, founder of Holcomb Valley, California

== See also ==
- Holcombe (surname)
