= Holcomb =

Holcomb may refer to:

== Places ==
In the United States:

- Holcomb, Illinois
- Holcomb, Kansas
- Holcomb, Mississippi
- Holcomb, Missouri
- Holcomb, New York
- Holcomb, Washington
- Holcomb, West Virginia
- Holcomb Creek Falls in Georgia
- Holcomb Valley near Big Bear Lake, California
- Holcomb Gardens on the Butler University campus in Indianapolis
- Holcomb Observatory and Planetarium at Butler University

== Other uses ==
- Holcomb (surname)

== See also ==
- Holcombe (disambiguation)
- Justice Holcomb (disambiguation)
