= Holcombe =

Holcombe may refer to:

== Places ==
=== In England ===
- Holcombe, Greater Manchester, a village
- Holcombe, East Devon, a hamlet
- Holcombe, Somerset, a village and civil parish
- Holcombe, Teignbridge, a village in Devon
- Holcombe Burnell, a Devon parish
- Holcombe Brook railway station, Greater Manchester
- Holcombe Manor, Chatham, Kent
- Holcombe House, Painswick, Gloucestershire
- Holcombe Rogus, Devon, a village and civil parish
  - Holcombe Court, Devon
- Great Holcombe, Oxfordshire, a hamlet

=== In the United States ===
- Holcombe, Wisconsin, unincorporated community
- Lake Holcombe, Wisconsin, town
- Holcombe Flowage, recreation area, Wisconsin
- Holcombe Site, aka Holcombe Beach, Michigan archeological site

== People with a forename Holcombe ==
(in order of last name)

- Charles Holcombe Dare, Royal Navy officer
- Holcombe Ingleby, English solicitor, MP for King's Lynn
- Lyle Holcombe Miller, US Marine Corps officer
- Lucy Petway Holcombe Pickens, 19th-century US landowner
- Holcombe Read, English cricketer
- Holcombe Rucker, US recreation ground director
- Henry Holcombe Tucker, US university chancellor
- Holcombe Waller, US singer and composer
- Holcombe Ward, US tennis player
- Michael Holcombe Wilson, Canadian politician

== Other uses ==
- Holcombe (surname)
- Holcombe Grammar School, Chatham, Kent
- Holcombe Hockey Club, Rochester, Kent
- Holcombe Legion, a unit in the Confederate States Army during the American Civil War
- HMS Holcombe, British Royal Navy destroyer, launched 1942

== See also ==
- Holcomb (disambiguation)
