= Michael Johnson (safety) =

American football player (born 1984)

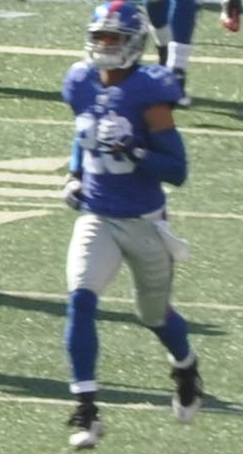
- Johnson with the New York Giants in 2009

No. 43, 20, 45
- Position: Safety

Personal information
- Born: May 9, 1984 (age 42); Austin, Texas, U.S.
- Listed height: 6 ft 2 in (1.88 m)
- Listed weight: 207 lb (94 kg)

Career information
- High school: Pflugerville (Pflugerville, Texas)
- College: Arizona
- NFL draft: 2007: 7th round, 224th overall pick

Career history
- New York Giants (2007–2010); Detroit Lions (2011)*
- * Offseason or practice squad member only

Awards and highlights
- Super Bowl champion (XLII); Second-team All-Pac-10 (2006)

Career NFL statistics
- Total tackles: 159
- Sacks: 2
- Forced fumbles: 1
- Fumble recoveries: 2
- Interceptions: 3
- Stats at Pro Football Reference

Michael Johnson (born May 9, 1984) is an American former professional football player who was a safety in the National Football League (NFL). He was selected by the New York Giants in the seventh round of the 2007 NFL draft and was also a member of the Detroit Lions. He played college football for the Arizona Wildcats.

== College career ==
Johnson played in 21 games with 14 starts at the University of Arizona after transferring from Tyler Junior College. Was credited with 107 tackles (75 solo) and had 5 interceptions, 5.5 tackles for losses, a forced fumble and 2 fumble recoveries. In 2006, started all 10 games in which he played at strong safety, he earned All-Pac-10 2nd-team honors and finished 5th on the team with 47 tackles (35 solo), including 1 stop for a 7-yard loss. He caused and recovered 1 fumble, deflected 4 passes and intercepted another.

== Professional career ==
Pre-draft measurables
Height	Weight	Arm length	Hand span	40-yard dash	10-yard split	20-yard split	20-yard shuttle	Three-cone drill	Vertical jump	Broad jump	Bench press
6 ft 2 5/8 in (1.90 m)	205 lb (93 kg)	32 in (0.81 m)	9 1/2 in (0.24 m)	4.53 s	1.53 s	2.61 s	4.11 s	7.04 s	35.5 in (0.90 m)	9 ft 9 in (2.97 m)	18 reps
All values from NFL Combine/Pro Day

=== New York Giants ===
Johnson was a seventh round (224th pick overall) draft choice by the Giants in 2007, and wore jersey number 43. He joined Aaron Ross, Steve Smith, Jay Alford, Zak DeOssie, Kevin Boss, Adam Koets, and Ahmad Bradshaw as 2007 Giants draft choices who contributed in their rookie season for the Giants Super Bowl XLII win. In the NFC Championship that season against the Green Bay Packers, Johnson made a critically important play late in the 4th quarter: Fellow Giant R. W. McQuarters fumbled a punt return, and as Packer Jarrett Bush wrapped his hands around the ball to recover it, Johnson dove in and punched the ball out of Bush's hands. The fumble was eventually recovered by fellow Giant Domenik Hixon, and they went on to win the game in overtime.

In 2008, Johnson switched to number 20. Originally sought to be a temporary holder of the free safety position until first rounder Kenny Phillips was ready, Johnson held on to a starting spot all season, playing games at both free safety and strong safety. He finishing the regular season second on the team with 88 total tackles and two interceptions.

Johnson became an unrestricted free agent following the 2010 season, picked up by the Detroit Lions.

=== Detroit Lions ===
On August 10, 2011, Johnson signed with the Detroit Lions. He was released on August 29, 2011.

== NFL career statistics ==
Legend
**Bold**	Career high

=== Regular season ===
Year	Team	Games		Tackles					Interceptions					Fumbles			
Year	Team	GP	GS	Cmb	Solo	Ast	Sck	TFL	Int	Yds	TD	Lng	PD	FF	FR	Yds	TD
2007	NYG	**16**	5	25	23	2	0.0	3	0	0	0	0	2	**1**	0	0	0
2008	NYG	**16**	**16**	**72**	**47**	**25**	**1.0**	2	**2**	**18**	0	**18**	**4**	0	**1**	0	0
2009	NYG	15	14	59	46	13	**1.0**	**6**	1	0	0	0	**4**	0	**1**	0	0
2010	NYG	2	0	3	1	2	0.0	0	0	0	0	0	0	0	0	0	0
		49	35	159	117	42	2.0	11	3	18	0	18	10	1	2	0	0

=== Playoffs ===
Year	Team	Games		Tackles					Interceptions					Fumbles			
Year	Team	GP	GS	Cmb	Solo	Ast	Sck	TFL	Int	Yds	TD	Lng	PD	FF	FR	Yds	TD
2007	NYG	**4**	0	4	3	**1**	0.0	0	0	0	0	0	**2**	0	0	0	0
2008	NYG	1	**1**	**5**	**5**	0	0.0	**2**	0	0	0	0	0	0	0	0	0
		5	1	9	8	1	0.0	2	0	0	0	0	2	0	0	0	0

== Personal life ==
Born in Austin, Texas, Johnson attended Pflugerville High School. He is the younger brother of former Detroit Lions linebacker Reggie Brown.
