= Dudley Carleton (diplomat) =

English courtier (c. 1599–1654)

Sir Dudley Carleton (c. 1599–1654) was a minor diplomat and Clerk of the Council. He was the younger son of George and Catharine Carleton née Harrison of Huntercombe Oxfordshire and lived at Clerkenwell and Holcombe, Oxfordshire.

== Career ==
Carleton was secretary to his uncle Dudley Carleton, Viscount Dorchester (1573–1632) and from him inherited Imber Court Surrey.

He was sworn one of the clerks of His Majesty's Council Extraordinary, 21 August 1623 and was knighted at Newmarket on 1 March 1629–30, being the next knight made by Charles I after Sir Peter Paul Rubens. He acted as the King's agent returning to and from the Hague, where he was joined with William Boswell in a special mission in August, 1632, and returned to England on 9 November following.

Carleton married Barbara, daughter of Adriaen Duyck, lord ("heer") of Oudkarspel and Koedijk in Holland, and secretary of the States of Holland, and widow of Nicholas Throckmorton, and, second, Lucy, daughter of Sir Herbert Croft of Croft Castle and sister of Herbert Croft, Bishop of Hereford and dean of the Chapels Royal, but had no male heir.

== Posterity ==
He was grandfather of:

from his first marriage:

- Dorothy Ferrers (died 1716) Countess of Arran and her brother
- Sir Humphrey Ferrers (1652–1678) of Tamworth Castle whose only child, Anne, took the Ferrers estates to the Shirley family. Robert Shirley then obtained the termination of the abeyance of the title of Baron Ferrers of Chartley and in 1711 was created Earl Ferrers

from his second marriage:

- Sir John Vanbrugh (1664–1726) and his brother
- Philip Vanbrugh (1681–1753) RN, commodore governor of Newfoundland
- Lieutenant General Edward Pearce (1658–1715), father of Edward Lovett Pearce
- Lieutenant General Thomas Pearce (1670–1739), governor of the castle and city of Limerick
- Lucy Pearce (c. 1664–1727), Mrs Thomas Claxton of Dublin, mother-in-law of: James Johnston secretary of State for Scotland, Richard Parsons Earl of Rosse, Robert, Viscount Jocelyn, lord chancellor of Ireland and Thomas Carter Irish politician
- Elizabeth Pearce (1667–1740), wife of George Eglesfield of Queen's College, Philadelphia and Cape May

== Sources ==
- Contemporary publications; Pedigree of Sir Dudley Carleton, subsequently created Viscount Dorchester, by Thomas William King, York Herald, F.S.A.
