= DeOssie =

DeOssie is a surname. Notable people with the surname include:

- Steve DeOssie (born 1962), American football player
- Zak DeOssie (born 1984), American football player, son of Steve
