= Will Beatty =

American football player (born 1985)

William Beatty
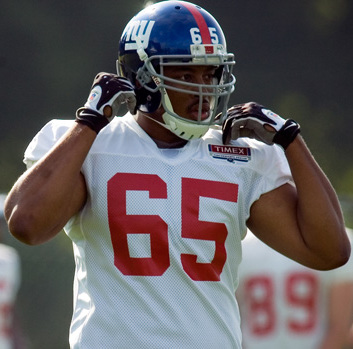
- Beatty with the New York Giants in 2009

No. 65, 66
- Position: Offensive tackle

Personal information
- Born: March 2, 1985 (age 41); York, Pennsylvania, U.S.
- Listed height: 6 ft 6 in (1.98 m)
- Listed weight: 291 lb (132 kg)

Career information
- High school: William Penn (York)
- College: Connecticut
- NFL draft: 2009: 2nd round, 60th overall pick

Career history
- New York Giants (2009–2016); Philadelphia Eagles (2017)

Awards and highlights
- 2× Super Bowl champion (XLVI, LII); 2008 First-team All-Big East

Career NFL statistics
- Games played: 89
- Games started: 63
- Stats at Pro Football Reference

William Keith Beatty (born March 2, 1985) is an American former professional football player who was an offensive tackle in the National Football League (NFL). He played college football for the Connecticut Huskies, and was selected by the New York Giants in the second round of the 2009 NFL draft. He won two Super Bowl rings, one with the Giants when they won Super Bowl XLVI and one with the Eagles when they won Super Bowl LII, both over the New England Patriots.

== Professional career ==
=== Pre-draft ===
Beatty participated in the 2009 NFL Combine in Indianapolis. He wore the OL2 jersey. He was a top performer in the 40-yard dash, the Vertical Jump, the Broad Jump, and the 3 Cone Drill. Beatty did 27 reps of 225 lbs at the Combine, but elected to re-do the Bench at the UCONN Pro-Day, where he did 30 reps of 225 lbs.

Pre-draft measurables
Height	Weight	40-yard dash	Three-cone drill	Vertical jump	Broad jump	Bench press
6 ft 6 in (1.98 m)	307 lb (139 kg)	5.12 s	7.62 s	33.5 in (0.85 m)	8 ft 11 in (2.72 m)	30 reps

=== New York Giants ===
==== 2009 season ====
Beatty was selected with the 28th pick of the second round (#60 overall) by the New York Giants in the 2009 NFL draft. On July 30, 2009, the Giants announced that they had signed Beatty to a 4-year contract worth $2.67 million.

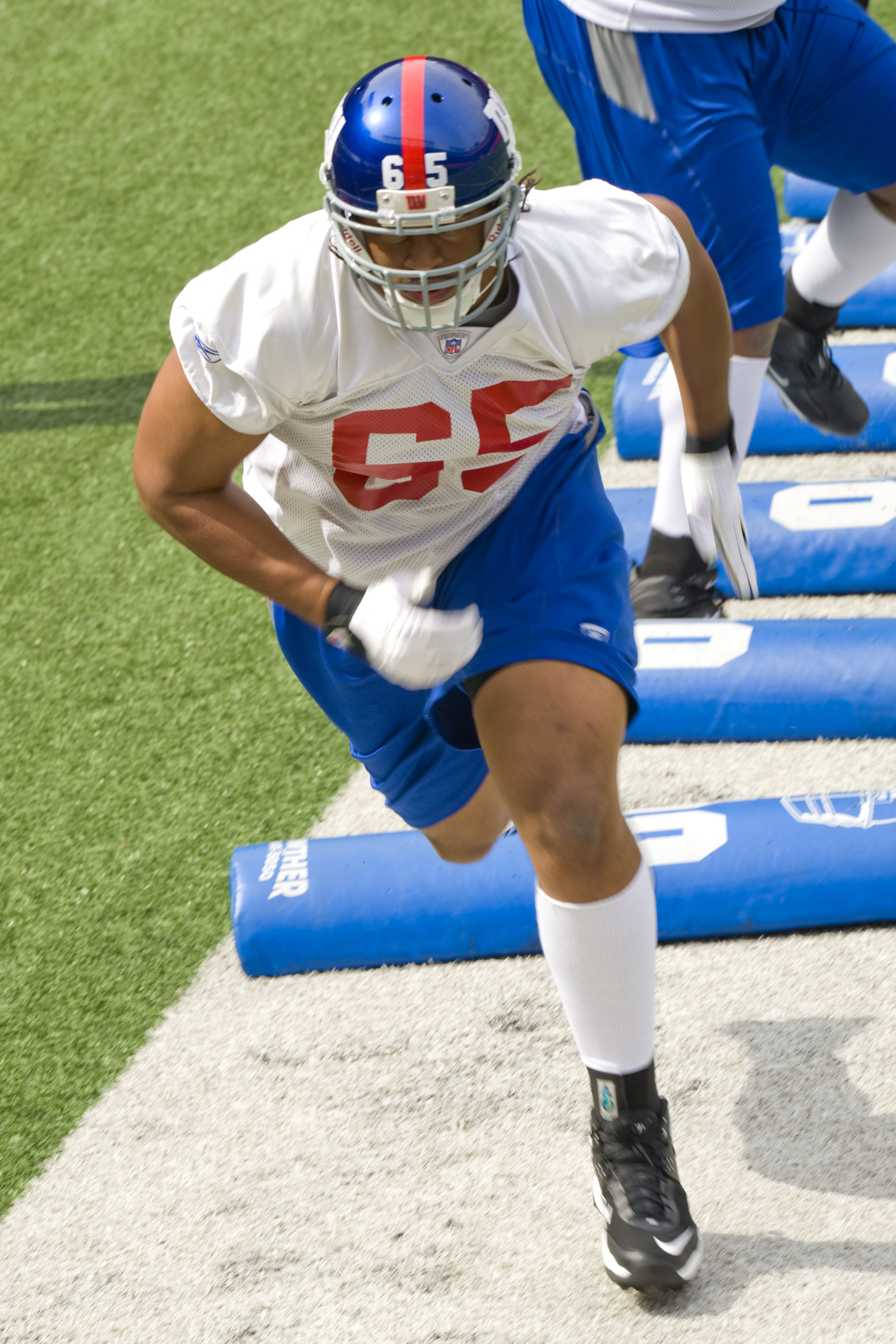
Beatty in 2009

In his rookie season, Beatty played in all 16 games. He began the season as a special teams player and situational tight end when the Giants wanted to use an extra blocking tight end. Beatty started 4 games in his rookie campaign at Right Tackle, replacing the injured Kareem McKenzie. His first career start came against the Arizona Cardinals on Sunday Night Football on NBC on October 25, 2009. This ended the current streak of 38 consecutive starts by the offensive line unit. Not until the final 3 games of the regular season did Beatty get the opportunity to start again as McKenzie went down with another injury. Beatty started against the Washington Redskins on Monday Night Football on December 21, 2009; the Carolina Panthers on December 27, 2009; and the Minnesota Vikings on January 3, 2010. In all of the final 3 games Beatty went up against premier defensive ends including Washington's Brian Orakpo, Carolina's Julius Peppers, and Minnesota's Jared Allen. The Giants failed to make the playoffs in 2009 despite winning their first 5 games of the year.

==== 2010 season ====
The 2010 offseason had much speculation about Beatty becoming the starting left tackle. Beatty began the regular season as an extra tight end and special teams contributor. In the first game of the 2010 season, Beatty suffered a foot injury that sidelined him for 8 weeks. He was able to return and started two games at Left Tackle for the injured David Diehl. During this season, Beatty did not give up any sacks. He defines his role with the Giants succinctly: "Keeping Eli clean is my job."

==== 2011 season ====
During the lockout of the 2011 offseason, Beatty gained 19 pounds and reported to camp at 319 pounds. In training camp, Beatty won the starting Left Tackle job. The offensive line underwent significant change as veteran offensive linemen Shaun O'Hara and Rich Seubert were both released. In the first preseason game against the Carolina Panthers, Beatty did not give up any sacks. Beatty gained media attention in the week following the game for his tough practicing against Jason Pierre-Paul, who had 2 sacks in the Carolina Preseason game and veteran Osi Umenyiora. Beatty wrote on his Twitter page, "Today I showed a vet, Osi Umenyiora #NYG how much I have grown and prepared this off season. I'm glad to have the opportunity to practice my skill on a great pass rusher in the NFL." The following day he added, "We had open practice today and all I can say is, if you missed practice you missed a good show." This smack-talking was well received by Giants fans who originally thought that Beatty was too soft and mild-mannered to play in the NFL. Beatty started the first 10 games at Left Tackle for the Giants in 2011.

==== Detached retina ====
On November 23, Beatty discovered that he had a detached retina after playing the Philadelphia Eagles. Beatty had emergency surgery the next day on Thanksgiving Day in New York City to fix the issue. He missed the Monday Night Football game (loss) against the New Orleans Saints. While his eye had been 100% fully reattached, he would not be ready for full contact this season. He was placed on the injured reserve on November 30 with the Giants record being 6-5. The Giants won the Super Bowl this season. Beatty became the first Connecticut football player to win an NFL Super Bowl.

==== 2011 offseason ====
In the offseason, during a lifting session, Beatty disrupted the sciatic nerve in his back. The nerve injury sidelined Beatty from OTA's.

==== 2012 season ====
While allowing his Sciatic nerve to fully heal, Beatty sat out the majority of the pre-season. Due to the detached retina he sustained in the previous season, Beatty received a new helmet, with a shaded visor and a 5 bar facemask to prevent injury and glare.

Beatty was declared "healed" by the medical staff prior to week 1 of the regular season, but in attempt to ease Beatty back into the flow of the game, the coaching staff used Beatty as a 3rd TE in their jumbo package against the Cowboys. Veteran tackle Sean Locklear got the start for Beatty in the season opener. The Giants lost to the Cowboys.

In the second game of the season against the Tampa Bay Buccaneers, Locklear also got the start over Beatty. Beatty started the game as the 3rd TE in the jumbo package. In the first half of the game, Eli Manning threw a red zone pass just behind a wide open Beatty, who missed the catch. Beatty poked fun at himself on his Twitter page, "I had a moment to show the world how versatile O Line men can be..... Sorry fellows for not finishing the play." He also include a video of the missed catch on his page. Also during the 1st half, RT David Diehl went down with a knee injury. Locklear then moved to RT, and Beatty moved into the LT spot. He and the rest of the offensive line worked cohesively to protect Eli Manning while he manufactured a fourth quarter comeback.

The third game of the season was a Thursday Night game against the Carolina Panthers. Beatty started the game at LT. The offensive line blocked well in pass protection and run blocking. 4th year RB Andre Brown, in his first career start, ran for 113 yards and 2 touchdowns. This game was arguably Beatty's finest game as a pro to date.

Beatty started the remaining games of the 2012 season at Left Tackle for the Giants. For the 3rd time in his four-year career, the Giants failed to make the playoffs. They finished with a 9-7 record.

For the 2012 NFL season, Pro Football Focus ranked Beatty as the #2 overall LT in the NFC with a 22.3 rating, behind Pro-Bowler Joe Staley. Pro Football Focus also ranked Beatty as the #3 Pass Blocking LT in the NFC, and #2 Run Blocking LT in the NFC (#5 in the NFL), making him one of the most balanced and productive LT in the NFL. His low score could mostly be attributed to his 11 penalties.

==== 2012 offseason ====
On February 27, 2013, Beatty re-signed with the New York Giants. Will signed a 5-year contract worth up to $38.75 million, with $19 million guaranteed and a $12.5 million signing bonus.

"It's good to be home," Beatty said. "It's a great feeling. You could be going through free agency, but when that happens a lot of stuff is going through your mind. That feeling is no longer there. You're settled in with a great team, a team I love playing for. I know the coaching staff. I'm looking forward to getting back in it and moving forward."

"I'm glad I don't have any of those free agency jitters to deal with. It's settled, we're done and we're moving on. The contract is behind you – you just have to make sure you're out there on the field and being a leader out there."

Giants GM Jerry Reese commented that "We are very pleased to get a new deal done with Will. We believe he is one of the ascending left tackles in the NFL."

==== 2013 season ====
Beatty started every game at Left Tackle for the Giants. Beatty broke his leg in the final game of the season vs the Washington Redskins, when DeAngelo Hall upended Beatty in frustration. Hall was fined $7,875 for slamming Beatty's head into the ground while Beatty laid on the ground with a fractured leg.

==== 2014 season ====
Despite breaking his leg, Beatty did not miss any training camp or pre-season. Beatty started the 2014 season, his first under new Offensive Coordinator Ben McAdoo, as the #1 Offensive Tackle as ranked by Pro Football Focus. He remained #1 on the list until a Week 7 PFF score of -6.3 dropped him in the rankings. Beatty leveled off to finish as PFF's 11th best Overall Left Tackle and in their top 10 in run blocking. Beatty started every game in 2014. His third consecutive season playing every game.

==== 2015 season ====
On May 20, 2015, during a lifting session, Beatty suffered a torn pectoral injury which required surgery, sidelining him for 5–6 months. On September 1, 2015, Beatty was placed on the reserve/physically unable to perform list by the Giants, which forced him sit out the first six games of the 2015 season. On November 12, 2015, Giants head coach Tom Coughlin announced that Beatty needed shoulder surgery for a torn rotator cuff and would not return during the 2015 season. Beatty injured his rotator cuff while rehabilitating his pectoral muscle.

==== 2016 season ====
On February 10, 2016, Beatty was released by the New York Giants. He was re-signed by the Giants on August 30, 2016.

=== Philadelphia Eagles ===
On November 14, 2017, Beatty signed a one-year contract with the Philadelphia Eagles. Beatty won his second Super Bowl ring when the Eagles defeated the New England Patriots 41-33.

== Personal life ==
Will graduated with a degree in Human Development and Family Studies and has garnered national attention in the New York Times and York Daily Record for his ability to sew, cook, clean, draw and play the piano. Married to Rebecca Helwig. The two were married on February 11, 2012 in West Orange. In 2013, Helwig gave birth to their first child, a girl named Victoria Zoe. In 2014, a second daughter, Alessandra Chloe, was born. Beatty also owns a clothing line, The William Beatty Apparel Company.
