= Holcombe (surname) =

Origin
- Meaning: "from (a place called) Holcombe"; Anglo-Saxon origin
- Region of origin: Devon and other English counties

Other names
- Variant forms: Holcomb, Halcombe and other variant spellings

Holcombe is a surname, originating in a number of English villages with the name. Early examples are recorded as de Holcombe, and the final e has been dropped from many family names. Notable people with the surname Holcombe (with an e) include:

- Alex Holcombe (born 1969), American basketball player
- Brett Holcombe, Australian paralympic athlete
- Brian Holcombe (born 1941), former Australian Rules footballer
- Carven Holcombe (born 1964), American basketball player
- Ken Holcombe (1918–2010), Major League Baseball pitcher
- Randall G. Holcombe (born 1950), American economist

== See also ==
- Holcomb (surname)
