= DeAndre Wright =

American football player (born 1986)

No. 2
- Position: Cornerback

Personal information
- Born: April 13, 1986 (age 40); Washington, D.C., U.S.
- Listed height: 5 ft 11 in (1.80 m)
- Listed weight: 198 lb (90 kg)

Career information
- College: New Mexico
- NFL draft: 2009: 6th round, 200th overall pick

Career history
- New York Giants (2009)*; Detroit Lions (2009)*; Minnesota Vikings (2009–2010)*; Cleveland Browns (2010)*; Minnesota Vikings (2010)*; New Mexico Stars (2012–2014); Duke City Gladiators (2015); New Mexico Stars (2016); Duke City Gladiators (2017)*
- * Offseason or practice squad member only

Awards and highlights
- First-team All-MW (2007); 2× Second-team All-MW (2006, 2008)
- Stats at Pro Football Reference

DeAndre Scott Wright (born April 13, 1986) is an American former professional football cornerback. He was selected by the New York Giants in the sixth round of the 2009 NFL draft. He played college football at New Mexico.

Wright was also a member of the Detroit Lions, Minnesota Vikings and Cleveland Browns. He now coaches the stars defence.

== Professional career ==
=== New York Giants ===
Selected by the Giants in the sixth round, Wright did not make it past final cuts for the 2009 season.

=== Minnesota Vikings (first stint) ===
Picked up as a free agent after failing to make the Giants, Wright was signed to the Vikings Practice Squad after the 2009 season got underway. Wright was released by the Vikings as part of final cuts on September 4, 2010, prior to the beginning of the 2010 NFL season.

=== Cleveland Browns ===
The Browns signed Wright to their practice squad before deleting him in the latter half of the 2010 season.

=== Minnesota Vikings (second stint) ===
Wright was once again signed to the Vikings Practice Squad late in the season due to the promotion of Marcus Sherels to make up for injuries in their secondary. Wright's practice team contract expired and was not renewed at the end of the 2010 season. DeAndre Wright is now an unrestricted free agent.

=== New Mexico Stars ===
Wright spent the 2012 through 2014 season on the New Mexico Stars of both the Indoor Football League and Lone Star Football League.

=== Return to Duke City ===
On January 1, 2017, Wright re-signed with the Duke City Gladiators. On March 1, 2017, Wright was released.
