= Dwayne Hendricks =

American football player (born 1986)

No. 74, 73
- Position: Defensive tackle

Personal information
- Born: March 17, 1986 (age 40); Millville, New Jersey, U.S.
- Listed height: 6 ft 3 in (1.91 m)
- Listed weight: 305 lb (138 kg)

Career information
- High school: Millville Senior
- College: Miami (Fla.)
- NFL draft: 2009: undrafted

Career history
- New York Giants (2009–2011); Virginia Destroyers (2012); Arizona Rattlers (2013)

Awards and highlights
- Super Bowl champion (XLVI)

Career NFL statistics
- Games played: 1
- Stats at Pro Football Reference

Career AFL statistics
- Total tackles: 1
- Stats at ArenaFan.com

Dwayne Hendricks (born March 17, 1986) is an American former professional football player who was a defensive tackle in the National Football League (NFL). He played college football for the Miami Hurricanes before being signed by the New York Giants as an undrafted free agent in 2009. He stayed with the team during the 2011 season. Hendricks was on the suspended list of the Arizona Rattlers during their ArenaBowl XXVI championship.
