= Kenny Phillips =

American football player (born 1986)

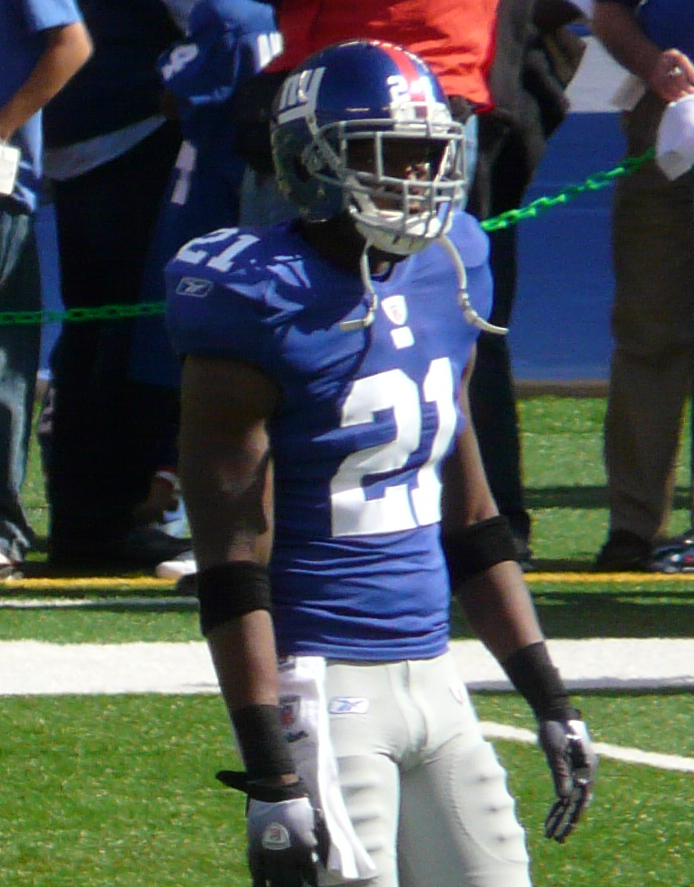
- Phillips with the New York Giants in 2010

No. 21, 38
- Position: Safety

Personal information
- Born: November 24, 1986 (age 39); Miami, Florida, U.S.
- Listed height: 6 ft 2 in (1.88 m)
- Listed weight: 217 lb (98 kg)

Career information
- High school: Miami Carol City (Miami Gardens, Florida)
- College: Miami (FL) (2005–2007)
- NFL draft: 2008: 1st round, 31st overall pick

Career history
- New York Giants (2008–2012); Philadelphia Eagles (2013)*; New Orleans Saints (2015)
- * Offseason or practice squad member only

Awards and highlights
- Super Bowl champion (XLVI); PFWA All-Rookie Team (2008); Third-team All-American (2007); Freshman All-American (2005); First-team All-ACC (2007); Second-team All-ACC (2006); Sporting News Freshman All-ACC (2005)

Career NFL statistics
- Total tackles: 275
- Forced fumbles: 1
- Fumble recoveries: 3
- Pass deflections: 26
- Interceptions: 8
- Stats at Pro Football Reference

Kenneth Phillips (born November 24, 1986) is an American former professional football player who was a safety in the National Football League (NFL). He was selected by the New York Giants 31st overall in the 2008 NFL draft and won Super Bowl XLVI with the team. He played college football at the University of Miami. He was also a member of the Philadelphia Eagles and New Orleans Saints.

== Early life ==
Phillips attended Miami Carol City Senior High in Miami, Florida, where he played safety. As a senior in 2004, played free safety and finished with 84 tackles, six interceptions, three fumble recoveries, four defensive touchdowns and three punt returns for touchdowns. Phillips intercepted 16 passes during his high school career. He also played in the prestigious U.S. Army All-American Bowl.

In 2004, Phillips was the nation's top safety prospect and USA Today Defensive Player of the Year. Phillips was a Parade All-American and was selected to the PrepStar Top 100 Dream Team. He was rated the nation's No. 1 safety prospect by leading college recruiting magazines Rivals and Scout and the No. 12 and No. 10 overall prospect by Rivals and Scout respectively. He was considered the No. 1 prospect in Dade County by The Miami Herald and the No. 1 prospect in the state by the Orlando Sentinel.

== College career ==
Phillips chose to attend the University of Miami over Tennessee, Florida State and North Carolina State.

In his freshman year, Phillips was named to the All-ACC Freshman Team after starting 11 games at free safety. He ranked third on the team with 67 tackles (40 solo), recovered two fumbles, broke up four passes and recorded one interception. Phillips interception came against the Clemson Tigers in triple overtime and sealed the win for the Hurricanes.

As a sophomore, Phillips was named to the All-ACC 1st Team and 2nd team All-American by Rivals.com. He started 10 games out of 10 at strong safety, missing only three games due to a torn ACL. He ranked fourth on the team in tackles with 54 total, broke up 6 passes, and recorded 4 interceptions. Phillips earned "ACC Defensive Back of the Week" honors for his play against Duke in which he tied a University of Miami record with three interceptions in one game.

Phillips was also named to the 2006 All-ACC Academic Football Team.

As a junior, Phillips was named to the All-ACC 1st Team for a second straight year, and 2nd team All-American for a second straight year. He started 12 games out of 12 at safety. Phillips ranked second on the team with a career-high 83 tackles(54 solo), made 6.5 tackles for loss, forced three fumbles, broke up 5 passes, and intercepted 2 passes.

After the season, Phillips declared for the NFL draft.

== Professional career ==
Pre-draft measurables
| Height | Weight | 40-yard dash | 10-yard split | 20-yard split | 20-yard shuttle | Three-cone drill | Vertical jump | Broad jump | Bench press |
|---|---|---|---|---|---|---|---|---|---|
| 6 ft 2 1/4 in (1.89 m) | 212 lb (96 kg) | 4.48 s | 1.47 s | 2.53 s | 4.27 s | 6.97 s | 32 1/2 in (0.83 m) | 10 ft 1 in (3.07 m) | 19 reps |
All values from NFL Combine

=== New York Giants ===
Phillips was selected in the first round (31st overall) by the New York Giants in the 2008 NFL draft. Many experts claimed there were no safeties in the draft worth a 1st-round pick, aside from Phillips; as expected, he was the only safety drafted in the 1st-round. His selection also continued the remarkable streak of University of Miami safeties selected in the 1st-round, the last being Brandon Meriweather, who was selected 24th overall by the New England Patriots in 2007. Prior to the draft, The Sporting News compared Phillips to Deon Grant.

Entering mini-camp, Phillips chose to wear the number 21 as a tribute to the late Sean Taylor, who, like Phillips, played safety at the University of Miami and wore the number 21 when he played for the Washington Redskins. On July 22, Phillips agreed to a five-year contract worth up to $11.15 million.

At the end of the 2008 preseason, Phillips was slated at the #2 spot on the depth chart at the free safety position behind Michael Johnson.

While not a starter, Phillips split time at the free safety position with Johnson and also played on special teams. He made the first interception of his career in week 8 against the Pittsburgh Steelers, coming with only minutes left in the 4th quarter, sealing a 21-14 victory for the Giants. Phillips got his first start of the season against the Eagles while James Butler was out with an injury. He remained the starter when Butler returned from his injury. As the season continued, Phillips' play showed marked improvement.

As no University of Miami player was selected in the first round of the 2009 NFL draft, Kenny Phillips' selection in 2008 marks the end of a fourteen-year streak during which at least one Miami Hurricane football player was taken each year. In 2015, for the first time since Phillips in 2008, a Miami Hurricane, wide receiver Phillip Dorsett, was taken in the first round.

On September 24, Phillips was placed on injured reserve with an "unhealthy left knee". Phillips was diagnosed with patellofemoral arthritis in his left knee before the season, and the condition worsened through the first two games of the 2009 season. Following microfracture surgery, it is unclear whether Phillips will be able to return to the level of play he exhibited before the injury.

Microfracture surgery has so far been seen as a success by doctors and Phillips himself. Phillips believed he would be ready for week one of the 2010 season for the Giants opener against the Carolina Panthers. If Phillips was not ready to go at the beginning of the season, he would be replaced by former Seattle Seahawk Deon Grant. Once ready to play, Phillips would team up with fellow University of Miami Hurricane Antrel Rolle in the Giants backfield for the first time. On September 12, Phillips made his long-awaited return to the Giants as a starter alongside Rolle in the Giants' season opener against the Carolina Panthers. He managed to intercept a pass from Panthers quarterback Matt Moore in the Giants' 31-18 victory.

For the 2011 regular season, Phillips recorded personal career-high statistics in three defensive categories: interceptions (4), pass deflections (11), and tackles (82).

At the end of the 2011 season, Phillips and the Giants appeared in Super Bowl XLVI. He started in the game as the Giants defeated the New England Patriots by a score of 21–17.

=== Philadelphia Eagles ===
Phillips signed with the Philadelphia Eagles on March 14, 2013. On August 25, 2013, Phillips was released by the Eagles.

=== New Orleans Saints ===
On December 31, 2014, Phillips signed a reserve/future contract with the New Orleans Saints. On September 6, 2015, Phillips was released by the Saints. He re-signed on September 14, 2015, due to the loss of teammate, Rafael Bush to a season-ending injury in a 31–19 loss against the Arizona Cardinals. Phillips made his first appearance on September 20, 2015, against the Tampa Bay Buccaneers, his first NFL game since 2012. The Saints released him on October 6.

=== Retirement ===
Phillips announced his retirement on July 6, 2016, citing injuries as the reason for his retirement.

=== Statistics ===
| | | Tackles | | | | | | Interceptions | | | | | Fumbles | |
| Year | Team | G | GS | Total | Solo | Sck | Sfty | Int | Yds | Avg | Lng | TD | FF | FR |
|---|---|---|---|---|---|---|---|---|---|---|---|---|---|---|
| 2008 | NYG | 16 | 3 | 67 | 55 | 0 | 0 | 1 | 0 | 0.0 | 0 | 0 | 0 | 0 |
| 2009 | NYG | 2 | 2 | 13 | 9 | 0 | 0 | 2 | 22 | 11.0 | 22 | 0 | 0 | 0 |
| 2010 | NYG | 16 | 16 | 77 | 60 | 0 | 0 | 1 | 0 | 0.0 | 0 | 0 | 0 | 0 |
| 2011 | NYG | 15 | 15 | 82 | 59 | 0 | 0 | 4 | 50 | 12.5 | 31 | 0 | 1 | 0 |
| Total | | 49 | 36 | 239 | 183 | 0 | 0 | 8 | 72 | 9.0 | 31 | 0 | 1 | 0 |
