= Sha'reff Rashad =

American football player (born 1986)

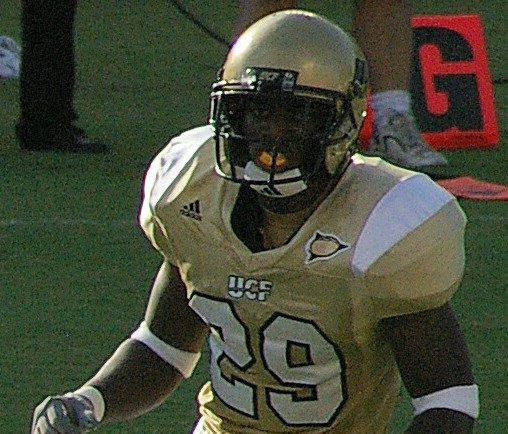
- Rashad at UCF in 2006

Profile
- Position: Safety

Personal information
- Born: October 6, 1989 (age 37); Summerville, South Carolina, U.S.
- Listed height: 6 ft 0 in (1.83 m)
- Listed weight: 198 lb (90 kg)

Career information
- High school: Episcopal (Jacksonville, Florida)
- College: UCF
- NFL draft: 2009: undrafted

Career history
- New York Giants (2009); Washington Redskins (2010); Utah Blaze (2012)

Awards and highlights
- First-team All-Conference USA (2011); Second-team All-Conference USA (2010)

Career NFL statistics
- Games played: 1
- Stats at Pro Football Reference

Career AFL statistics
- Tackles: 75
- Interceptions: 3
- Stats at ArenaFan.com

Sha'reff Rashad, Jr. (born October 6, 1986) is an American former professional football player who was a safety in the National Football League (NFL). He was signed by the New York Giants as an undrafted free agent in 2009. He played college football for the UCF Knights. In 2012, Sha'reff was signed as a DB by the Utah Blaze, an Arena Football team.

He also played for the Washington Redskins.
