= Stoney Woodson =

American football player (born 1985)

Profile
- Position: Cornerback

Personal information
- Born: October 11, 1985 (age 41); Tampa, Florida, U.S.
- Listed height: 5 ft 10 in (1.78 m)
- Listed weight: 198 lb (90 kg)

Career information
- College: South Carolina
- NFL draft: 2009: 7th round, 238th overall pick

Career history
- New York Giants (2009)*; Philadelphia Eagles (2009)*; Tampa Bay Buccaneers (2009–2010)*; Tri-Cities Fever (2012)*; Jacksonville Sharks (2012)*
- * Offseason or practice squad member only

Stoney Woodson (born October 11, 1985) is an American former football cornerback. He was selected by the New York Giants in the seventh round in the 2009 NFL draft. He played college football at South Carolina.

Woodson was also a member of the Philadelphia Eagles and Tampa Bay Buccaneers.

He attended George S. Middleton High School in Tampa, FL, and played for the Middleton High School Tigers high school football team.

== Professional career ==
Woodson was selected by the New York Giants in the seventh round of the 2009 NFL draft. He suffered an ankle injury prior to the start of the 2009 season and was placed on injured reserve. The Giants gave him an injury settlement on September 6, 2009.

Woodson was signed to the Philadelphia Eagles practice squad on October 13, 2009. He was released from the practice squad on October 22. He was re-signed to the practice squad on November 11 after cornerback Jack Ikegwuonu was promoted to the active roster. He was released on December 8.

Woodson was signed to the Tampa Bay Buccaneers' practice squad on December 9, 2009. On January 5, 2010, he signed a reserve future contract. He was waived on April 26, 2010.

Woodson signed with the Tri-Cities Fever of the Indoor Football League for the 2012 season. He was later let out of his contract to pursue a higher level.

Woodson with the Jacksonville Sharks of the Arena Football League on September 29, 2011. He was released by the Sharks on March 7, 2012.
