= Bruce Johnson (gridiron football) =

American gridiron football player (born 1987)

No. 25
- Position: Cornerback

Personal information
- Born: December 18, 1987 (age 38); Live Oak, Florida, U.S.
- Listed height: 5 ft 11 in (1.80 m)
- Listed weight: 182 lb (83 kg)

Career information
- College: Miami (FL)
- NFL draft: 2009: undrafted

Career history
- New York Giants (2009–2012); Winnipeg Blue Bombers (2014–2017)

Awards and highlights
- Super Bowl champion (XLVI); First defensive touchdown scored in the new Cowboys Stadium. (9/20/09)

Career NFL statistics
- Total tackles: 51
- Sacks: 1
- Pass deflections: 8
- Interceptions: 2
- Defensive touchdowns: 1
- Stats at Pro Football Reference
- Stats at CFL.ca

Bruce Johnson (born December 18, 1987) is a former American American football and Canadian football cornerback. He played for the New York Giants of the National Football League (NFL) and the Winnipeg Blue Bombers of the Canadian Football League (CFL). He played college football at the University of Miami and high school football at Suwannee High School in Live Oak.

== High school ==
As a senior in 2004, Johnson played cornerback and wide receiver, making 44 solo tackles along with 17 assisted tackle, one forced fumble, and two interceptions, along with 39 receptions for 546 yards and three touchdowns, and was named District Player of the Year. Out of high school he was ranked the 20th best cornerback by Scout.com. He chose Miami over Auburn and Clemson.

== Professional career ==
Pre-draft measurables
| Height | Weight | Arm length | Hand span | 40-yard dash | 10-yard split | 20-yard split | 20-yard shuttle | Three-cone drill | Vertical jump | Broad jump | Bench press |
|---|---|---|---|---|---|---|---|---|---|---|---|
| 5 ft 9 1/2 in (1.77 m) | 170 lb (77 kg) | 32 in (0.81 m) | 8 5/8 in (0.22 m) | 4.42 s | 1.55 s | 2.64 s | 4.03 s | 6.71 s | 38.5 in (0.98 m) | 10 ft 5 in (3.18 m) | 6 reps |
All values from NFL Combine/Pro Day

=== New York Giants ===
After going undrafted in the 2009 NFL draft, Johnson was signed as an undrafted free agent by the New York Giants. On September 20, 2009, he returned a Tony Romo interception 34 yards for a touchdown against the Dallas Cowboys. On December 21, 2009, he recorded his second interception of the season for 49 yards against the Washington Redskins on Monday Night Football. The Redskins ran the Swinging Gate on that play before halftime with punter Hunter Smith at Quarterback which resulted in Johnson getting the interception. He ended his rookie season with 46 total tackles, 1.0 sacks, 2 forced fumbles, 8 passes defended, 2 interceptions and a touchdown.

After a promising rookie season, only played in 6 games in 2010 after undergoing arthroscopic knee surgery.

Johnson missed the entire 2011 season with a ruptured Achilles tendon that he suffered before the season even began.

== Personal ==
Johnson is the nephew of former Miami Hurricane teammate Kelly Jennings.
