= Charlie Holcomb =

American-born English cricketer

Personal information
- Full name: Charlie Alan Holcomb
- Born: 4 March 1980 (age 46); Oklahoma, USA
- Batting: Right-handed
- Bowling: Right-arm off break

Domestic team information
- Years: Team
- 1999–2003: Dorset

Career statistics
Competition	List A
Matches	1
Runs scored	1
Batting average	1.00
100s/50s	0/0
Top score	1
Catches/stumpings	0/–
- Source: Cricinfo, 18 March 2010

Charlie Alan Holcomb (born 4 March 1980) is a former American-born English cricketer. Holcomb was a right-handed batsman who bowled right-arm off break.

In 1999, Holcomb made a single List-A appearance for Dorset against Scotland in the 2nd round of the 1999 NatWest Trophy. Holcomb scored just 1 run, before being bowled by Gregor Maiden.

In 2003, Holcomb made his debut for Dorset in the Minor Counties Championship, playing 2 matches against Shropshire and Berkshire.
