= Anthony Bryant (American football) =

American football player (born 1981)

No. 64, 71, 62, 76
- Position: Nose tackle

Personal information
- Born: November 6, 1981 (age 44); Greensboro, Alabama, U.S.
- Listed height: 6 ft 3 in (1.91 m)
- Listed weight: 360 lb (163 kg)

Career information
- High school: Newbern (AL) Sunshine
- College: Alabama
- NFL draft: 2005: 6th round, 178th overall pick

Career history
- Tampa Bay Buccaneers (2005); Detroit Lions (2006); Atlanta Falcons (2007)*; Baltimore Ravens (2007)*; Miami Dolphins (2007); New York Giants (2009–2010)*; Washington Redskins (2010)
- * Offseason or practice squad member only

Career NFL statistics
- Total tackles: 19
- Fumble recoveries: 1
- Stats at Pro Football Reference

Anthony Bryant (born November 6, 1981) is an American former professional football player who was a defensive tackle in the National Football League (NFL). He played college football for the Alabama Crimson Tide.

== Professional career ==
Pre-draft measurables
| Height | Weight | 40-yard dash | 10-yard split | 20-yard split | 20-yard shuttle | Three-cone drill | Vertical jump | Broad jump | Bench press |
|---|---|---|---|---|---|---|---|---|---|
| 6 ft 3 in (1.91 m) | 337 lb (153 kg) | 4.98 s | 1.81 s | 2.97 s | 4.72 s | 7.80 s | 31 1/2 in (0.80 m) | 8 ft 10 in (2.69 m) | 23 reps |
All values from NFL Combine

Projected as a mid-seventh round pick, Bryant was selected by the Tampa Bay Buccaneers in the sixth round of the 2005 NFL draft with the 178th overall pick.

Bryant was also member of the Detroit Lions, Atlanta Falcons, Baltimore Ravens, Miami Dolphins, New York Giants, and Washington Redskins.
