= Mike Holcomb =

Southern Gospel bass singer (born 1954)

Michael Terry Holcomb (born February 2, 1954) is a Southern Gospel bass singer and Evangelist, best known for his forty plus years of work with The Inspirations.

== Biography ==
Holcomb was born in Pickens County, Georgia, on February 2, 1954, to Alfred Carl Holcomb Jr. and Sarah Piccola Padgett. He began singing at the age of 4 in church. He attended Tate Elementary School grades 1–5 and then moved to Jasper, Georgia, where he attended the Jasper Elementary School. in the 6th grade and Talking Rock Elementary in the 7th grade. Holcomb was saved on Wednesday, July 22, 1964, at Price Creek Baptist Church. He then attended Pickens County High School from the 8th grade through to the 12th grade and graduated from high school in 1972. Along the way he had sung bass in groups such as the Happy Harmony Quartet and the Deliverance Quartet. He had begun at a vocational college but dropped out in September 1972 to join The Inspirations. The group he attained success in the Southern Gospel genre with such songs as "Shouting Time In Heaven", "When I Wake Up To Sleep No More", "A Rose Among The Thorns" and "We Need To Thank God", "Jesus Is Coming Soon" and have sold over a million records. Mike has been featured on several top southern gospel songs including the following:"Hide me Rock of Ages", "I Get Happy", "Everybody will be happy", "The Son Came Down", "I'll have a New Life" "If You Only Knew", "God Makes No Mistakes" "Talk about Dying" and many many more. He married Bavaria Lynn Mitchell on April 25, 1976. He has two children Jeremy Nathan (born 1977) and Olivia Niccole (born 1979). Holcomb has two grandchildren; Aubrey is the daughter of Niccole and Nathan Pierce. The newest addition to the Holcomb family is Jackson Holcomb, son of Nathan and Brandy Holcomb. He resides in Bryson City, North Carolina.

== See also ==
- J.D. Sumner
- Tim Storms
