= Kevin Dockery =

American football player (born 1984)

No. 35
- Position: Cornerback

Personal information
- Born: January 8, 1984 (age 42); Hernando, Mississippi, U.S.
- Listed height: 5 ft 8 in (1.73 m)
- Listed weight: 188 lb (85 kg)

Career information
- High school: Hernando
- College: Mississippi State
- NFL draft: 2006: undrafted

Career history
- New York Giants (2006–2009); St. Louis Rams (2010); Pittsburgh Steelers (2011)*
- * Offseason or practice squad member only

Awards and highlights
- Super Bowl champion (XLII)

Career NFL statistics
- Total tackles: 171
- Forced fumbles: 2
- Fumble recoveries: 2
- Pass deflections: 30
- Interceptions: 4
- Defensive touchdowns: 1
- Stats at Pro Football Reference

Kevin Dockery (born January 8, 1984) is an American former professional football player who was a cornerback in the National Football League (NFL). He was signed by the New York Giants as an undrafted free agent in 2006. He played college football for the Mississippi State Bulldogs.

Dockery was also a member of the St. Louis Rams and Pittsburgh Steelers. He earned a Super Bowl ring with the Giants in Super Bowl XLII against the New England Patriots.

== College career ==
Dockery played in 44 games with 37 starts at cornerback for the Bulldogs and was credited with 195 tackles (117 solo) he also had 6 interceptions, 22 pass breakups and 2 sacks.

== Professional career ==
=== New York Giants ===
Dockery signed with the New York Giants as an undrafted free agent in 2006. His first career interception was a 96-yard return for a touchdown against the Dallas Cowboys in week 7 of the 2006 NFL season. He finished his rookie season with 35 tackles, two interceptions, and seven pass deflections in 14 games.

Dockery missed three games in 2007 with injuries, but in 13 games played he recorded 46 tackles, eight passes defended and a forced fumble.

In his third season in 2008, Dockery recorded his third career interception. In a game against the Philadelphia Eagles, he recovered a field goal blocked by Justin Tuck and returned it 71 yards for his second career touchdown.

A restricted free agent in the 2009 offseason, Dockery signed his one-year, $1.545 million tender offer on April 13.

=== St. Louis Rams ===
Dockery signed with the St. Louis Rams on March 22, 2010.

=== Pittsburgh Steelers ===
On August 17, 2011, Dockery signed with the Pittsburgh Steelers. He was released on August 28, 2011.
