= Kenny Ingram =

American gridiron football player (born 1986)

No. 46, 91
- Position: Linebacker

Personal information
- Born: February 27, 1986 (age 40)
- Listed height: 6 ft 5 in (1.96 m)
- Listed weight: 239 lb (108 kg)

Career information
- College: Florida State
- NFL draft: 2009: undrafted

Career history
- New York Giants (2009–2010)*; Hartford Colonials (2010); New York Giants (2010–2011)*; Virginia Destroyers (2011); Montreal Alouettes (2012)
- * Offseason or practice squad member only
- Stats at Pro Football Reference

Kenny Ingram (born February 27, 1986) is an American former football linebacker-Edge rusher. He was signed by the New York Giants as an undrafted free agent in 2009.

Ingram also played for the Hartford Colonials and the Virginia Destroyers of the United Football League.

== Early life ==
Ingram went to Edgewater High School, was a three-star player by Rivals.com and the No. 14 rated safety in the nation. He was a two-sport athlete who also played basketball and helped lead his team to the 6A state championship in 2003. He totaled 60 tackles and five interceptions as a senior, and as a junior he recorded 60 tackles (35 unassisted tackles and 25 assisted) along with six interceptions. He also played tight end in high school.

== College career ==
In 2008 Ingram played in a career-high 13 games and made the first five starts of his career and recorded a single-season career-high 22 tackles and 3.5 tackles for loss. In 2007, he re-joined the Seminoles after earning his eligibility back during the summer of 2007. He spent the summer of 2006 at Tallahassee Community College and the entire 2006–07 academic year at East Central Community College in Decatur, Miss. In 2007, he played in nine games and recorded five tackles as a special teams player. As a freshman in 2005 he appeared in 12 of Florida State's 13 games and finished with 10 tackles as he earned playing time in the defensive backfield and on special teams. He redshirted in 2004.

== Professional career ==
=== New York Giants ===
Ingram was signed as an undrafted free agent by the New York Giants following the 2009 NFL draft. He played safety in college but was converted to linebacker by the Giants. He was waived on September 5, 2009. On December 1, he was signed to their practice squad. On January 5, 2010 Ingram was signed to a reserved/future contract. Released by the Giants on July 30, 2010. After spending some time with the Hartford Colonials of the UFL, Ingram returned to the Giants, signing to the team's practice squad on December 15, 2010. He was waived on August 24, 2011.

=== Montreal Alouettes ===
On May 7, 2012, Ingram signed with the Montreal Alouettes of the Canadian Football League.
