= Vince Anderson (American football) =

American gridiron football player (born 1984)

No. 37, 16
- Position: Defensive back

Personal information
- Born: December 8, 1984 (age 41); Lake City, Florida, U.S.
- Listed height: 6 ft 2 in (1.88 m)
- Listed weight: 205 lb (93 kg)

Career information
- High school: Columbia (Lake City, Florida)
- College: Webber International
- NFL draft: 2009: undrafted

Career history
- New York Giants (2009–2010)*; Tampa Bay Buccaneers (2010); Montreal Alouettes (2012)*
- * Offseason or practice squad member only

Career NFL statistics
- Tackles: 1
- Interceptions: 0
- Sacks: 0
- Stats at Pro Football Reference

Vincent Anderson (born December 8, 1984) is a former gridiron football defensive back. He was signed by the New York Giants as an undrafted free agent in 2009. He played college football at Webber International.

Anderson was also a member of the Tampa Bay Buccaneers.

== Professional career ==
=== New York Giants ===
Anderson was signed by the New York Giants as an undrafted free agent following the 2009 NFL draft on April 29, 2009. He was waived on September 5 during final cuts, but was re-signed to the team's practice squad on September 6. He was placed on the practice squad injured reserve on December 8. He was signed to a reserve/future contract on January 4, 2010, but was waived on June 21 before the start of training camp.

=== Tampa Bay Buccaneers ===
Anderson was signed by the Tampa Bay Buccaneers on August 10, 2010. He was waived during final cuts on September 4, but was re-signed to the team's practice squad on September 5. He was promoted to the active roster on November 30. He was waived on August 29, 2011.
