= Justice Holcomb =

Justice Holcomb may refer to:

- Oscar Raymond Holcomb (1869–1948), associate justice and chief justice of the Washington Supreme Court
- Silas A. Holcomb (1858–1920), associate justice and chief justice of the Nebraska Supreme Court
