= Andre Brown (running back) =

American football player (born 1986)

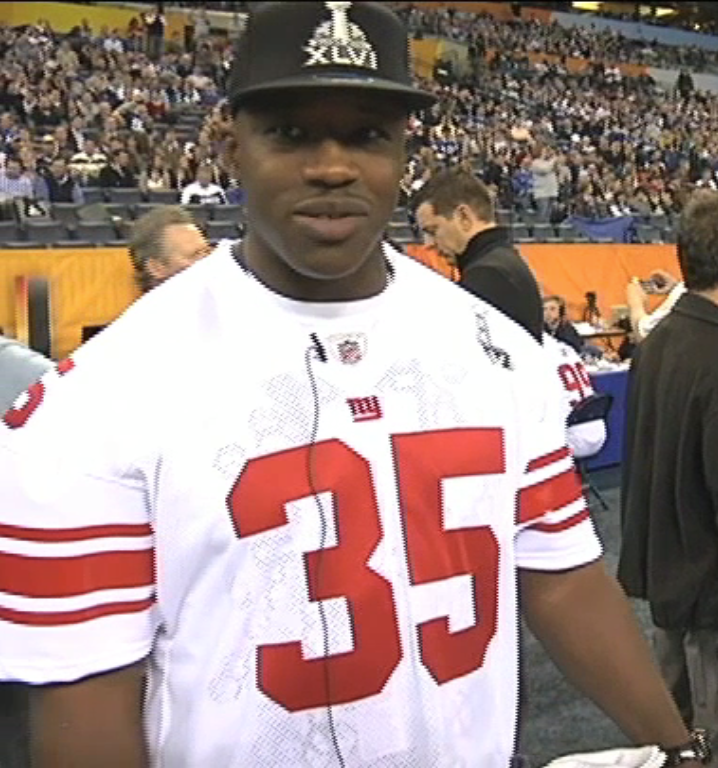
- Brown at Super Bowl XLVI media day

No. 22, 35, 33, 29
- Position: Running back

Personal information
- Born: December 15, 1986 (age 39); Baltimore, Maryland, U.S.
- Listed height: 6 ft 0 in (1.83 m)
- Listed weight: 227 lb (103 kg)

Career information
- High school: J.H. Rose (Greenville, North Carolina)
- College: NC State (2004–2008)
- NFL draft: 2009: 4th round, 129th overall pick

Career history
- New York Giants (2009); Denver Broncos (2010); Indianapolis Colts (2010); Carolina Panthers (2010); Washington Redskins (2010); New York Giants (2011–2013); Houston Texans (2014)*
- * Offseason or practice squad member only

Awards and highlights
- Super Bowl champion (XLVI)

Career NFL statistics
- Rushing attempts: 214
- Rushing yards: 876
- Receptions: 32
- Receiving yards: 189
- Total touchdowns: 11
- Stats at Pro Football Reference

Andre Brown (born December 15, 1986) is an American former professional football player who was a running back in the National Football League (NFL). He played college football for the NC State Wolfpack and was selected by the New York Giants in the fourth round of the 2009 NFL draft.

Brown was also a member of the Denver Broncos, Indianapolis Colts, Carolina Panthers, Washington Redskins and Houston Texans.

== College career ==
Brown played four seasons for the NC State, rushing for 2,539 yards and 22 touchdowns on 523 carries. He rushed for 767 yards and seven touchdowns (both career highs) as a senior in 2008.

== Professional career ==
=== New York Giants (first stint) ===
Brown was selected by the New York Giants in the fourth round (129th overall) of the 2009 NFL draft. He suffered a ruptured Achilles tendon during training camp on August 14, which forced him to miss his rookie season. He was placed on injured reserve on September 1, 2009. Brown was waived by the Giants on September 4, 2010.

=== Denver Broncos ===
On September 5, 2010, Brown was claimed off waivers by the Denver Broncos, waived on September 15, and then signed to the Broncos' practice squad on September 17, 2010. On September 21, 2010 Brown was signed to the active roster, and Lance Ball was waived. Brown himself was waived on October 16, 2010. In four regular season games with the Broncos, Brown played in three but only amassed statistics in one (two rushes for a total of minus one yard in a 31-17 road loss to the Baltimore Ravens on October 10, 2010).

=== Indianapolis Colts ===
Brown was claimed off waivers by the Indianapolis Colts on October 18, 2010. Brown was moved to the Colts active roster on November 6, 2010, then waived on November 9, 2010. Brown did not amass any statistics in his only game with the Colts, a 26-24 road loss to the Philadelphia Eagles on November 7, 2010.

=== Carolina Panthers ===
Brown was claimed off waivers by the Carolina Panthers on November 9, 2010, and then waived on November 16, 2010. Brown did not play in his only game with the Panthers, a 31-16 road loss to the Tampa Bay Buccaneers on November 14, 2010.

=== Washington Redskins ===
On November 24, 2010, Brown was signed by the Washington Redskins and added to their active roster. He was released on July 28, 2011.

=== New York Giants (second stint) ===
On August 3, 2011, Brown re-signed with the Giants. He was waived on September 3, but re-signed the next day to the practice squad. On February 5, 2012, Brown and the Giants won Super Bowl XLVI against the New England Patriots. After the game Brown became known for his celebratory song, "I got a ring", he and his teammates sang on the plane ride home and at the parade the following week.

In March 2012, Brown was hit with a four-game suspension by the NFL for violating the league's substance abuse policy. He later claimed it was a result of Adderall use and eventually won an appeal, having his suspension lifted.

On September 16, after starter Ahmad Bradshaw was knocked out of the game with a neck injury, Brown rushed for 71 yards on 13 carries, converting a two-point conversion and scoring the game-winning touchdown against the Tampa Bay Buccaneers.

On September 20, Brown stepped in as the starter for the Giants against the Carolina Panthers on Thursday Night Football. Brown rushed for 113 yards on 20 carries, scoring two rushing touchdowns. He also had 3 receptions for 17 yards.

On November 25, he suffered a broken fibula in the fourth quarter on a Sunday Night Football game against the Green Bay Packers at MetLife Stadium, effectively ending his season. He ended the season, where he participated in 10 games, with 73 carries for 385 yards, with a 5.3 yard per carry average, after only 2 carries in the previous 3 seasons. He was eventually placed on injured reserve.

In 2013, Brown injured his leg in the final preseason game for the New York Giants. He was expected back by week 10. He did return week 10 to face the Oakland Raiders, where he accumulated 115 yards rushing and one rushing touchdown in his 2013 debut.

=== Houston Texans ===
On April 7, 2014, Brown signed a one-year contract with the Houston Texans. He was released on August 11.
