= Brian Holcombe =

Australian rules footballer

Personal information
- Full name: Brian Holcombe
- Born: 28 July 1941 (age 85)
- Original team: Mildura Imperials
- Height: 185 cm (6 ft 1 in)
- Weight: 76 kg (168 lb)

Playing career^{1}
Years	Club	Games (Goals)
1961	Carlton	1 (0)
- ^{1} Playing statistics correct to the end of 1961.

Brian Holcombe (born 28 July 1941) is a former Australian rules footballer who played with Carlton in the Victorian Football League (VFL).
