= Kareem McKenzie =

American football player (born 1979)

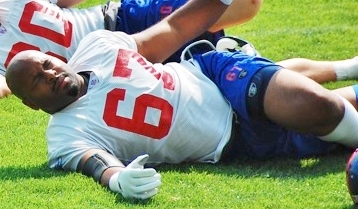
- McKenzie with the New York Giants in 2007

No. 67
- Position: Offensive tackle

Personal information
- Born: May 24, 1979 (age 47); Trenton, New Jersey, U.S.
- Listed height: 6 ft 6 in (1.98 m)
- Listed weight: 328 lb (149 kg)

Career information
- High school: Willingboro (NJ)
- College: Penn State
- NFL draft: 2001: 3rd round, 79th overall pick

Career history
- New York Jets (2001–2004); New York Giants (2005–2011)

Awards and highlights
- 2× Super Bowl champion (XLII, XLVI); 82nd greatest New York Giant of all-time; First-team All-Big Ten (1999); 2× Second-team All-Big Ten (1998, 2000)

Career NFL statistics
- Games played: 161
- Games started: 153
- Fumble recoveries: 11
- Stats at Pro Football Reference

Kareem Michael McKenzie (born May 24, 1979) is an American former professional football player who was an offensive tackle in the National Football League (NFL). As a member of the New York Giants, he won Super Bowl XLII and Super Bowl XLVI, twice against the New England Patriots. He played college football for the Penn State Nittany Lions.

== Early life and college career ==
McKenzie played only two years of high school football at Willingboro High School in Willingboro Township, New Jersey. McKenzie played college football at Penn State University.

== Professional career ==
Pre-draft measurables
| Height | Weight | 40-yard dash | 10-yard split | 20-yard split | 20-yard shuttle | Three-cone drill | Vertical jump | Broad jump | Bench press |
|---|---|---|---|---|---|---|---|---|---|
| 6 ft 6 in (1.98 m) | 328 lb (149 kg) | 5.33 s | 1.90 s | 3.10 s | 4.80 s | 7.87 s | 33 in (0.84 m) | 8 ft 7 in (2.62 m) | 20 reps |
Measurables are from the 2001 NFL Scouting Combine.

=== New York Jets (2001–2004) ===
McKenzie was drafted in the third round (79th overall) of the 2001 NFL draft by the New York Jets, and established himself as a premier run blocker over his first four seasons as a professional. McKenzie anchored the right tackle position and helped Curtis Martin achieve three straight 1,000-yard rushing seasons from 2002 to 2004, including an NFL best 1,697 yards in 2004.

=== New York Giants (2005–2012) ===
Before the 2005 season, McKenzie joined the New York Giants as a free agent. He suffered a hamstring injury in week 13 of the 2005 season against Giants rival, the Dallas Cowboys. McKenzie made an immediate impact as right tackle for the Giants in the 2005 season, paving the way for Tiki Barber in rushing for a franchise-record of 1,860 yards.

McKenzie was an integral part of the Giants' success in 2007 and won his first Super Bowl ring in Super Bowl XLII. He earned another ring with the Giants in Super Bowl XLVI. Following the season, he became a free agent and the Giants announced he would not be re-signed. After his time with the Giants, he did not sign with another team.

== Personal life ==
In May 2023, McKenzie graduated from Kean University with a Ph.D. in counseling and supervision.
