= Great Holcombe =

Hamlet in Oxfordshire, England

Coordinates: 51.6638°N 1.1208°W

- Location within Oxfordshire
- OS grid reference: SU572962
- Civil parish: Newington
- District: South Oxfordshire
- Shire county: Oxfordshire
- Region: South East
- Country: England
- Sovereign state: United Kingdom
- Post town: Wallingford
- Postcode district: OX10
- Dialling code: 01865
- Police: Thames Valley
- Fire: Oxfordshire
- Ambulance: South Central
- UK Parliament: Wantage

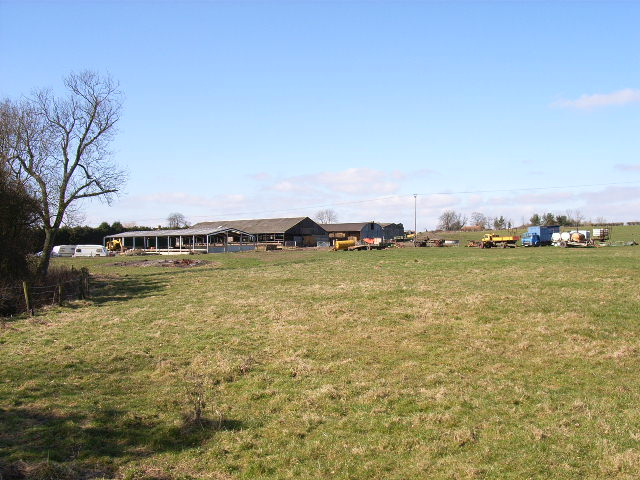
Great Holcombe Farm

Great Holcombe is a hamlet in Newington civil parish in South Oxfordshire, about 4.5 miles (7.2 km) north of Wallingford.
