= Al Holcomb =

American football coach (born 1970)

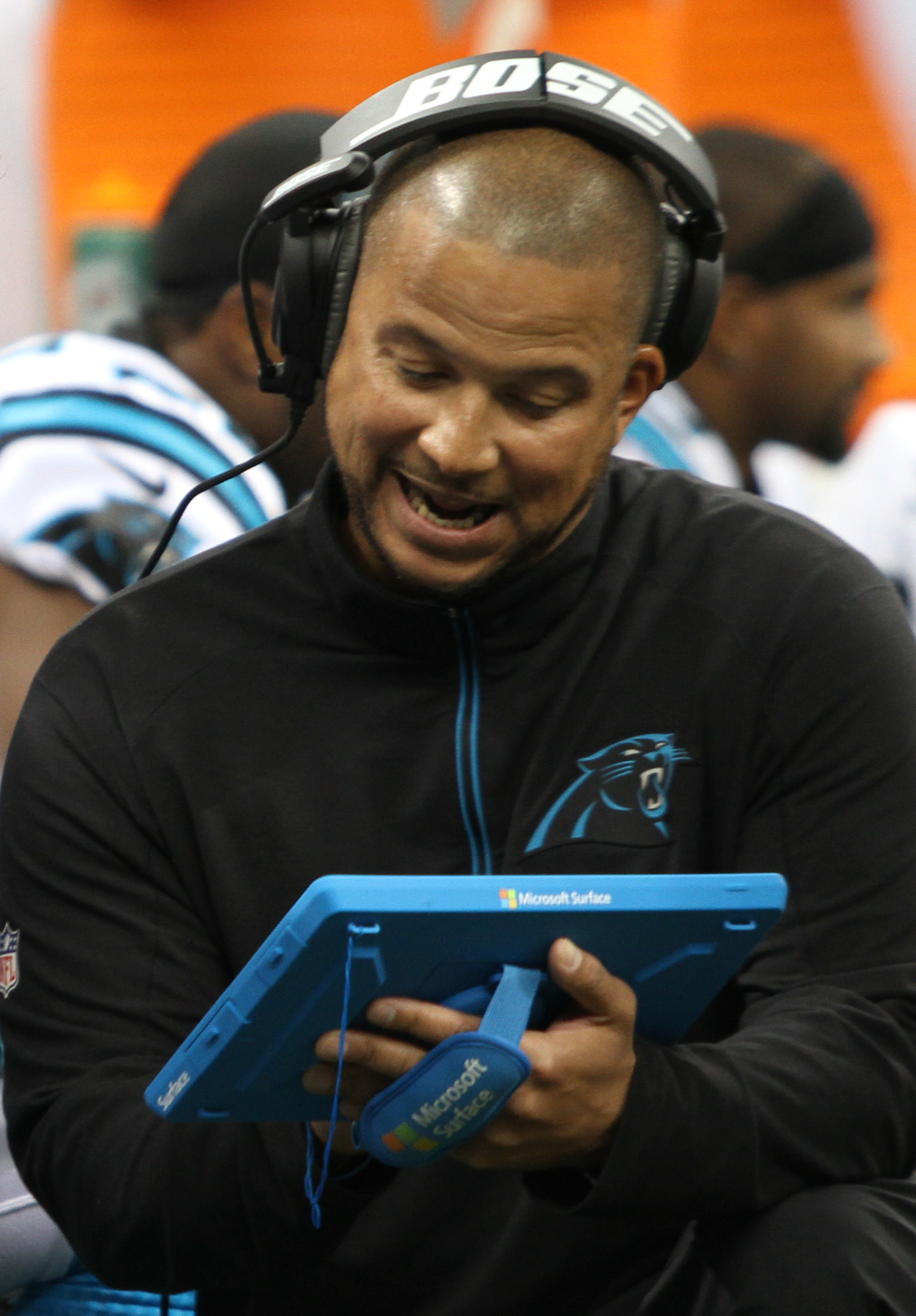
- Holcomb with the Carolina Panthers in 2015

Las Vegas Raiders
- Title: Senior defensive assistant

Personal information
- Born: October 22, 1970 (age 56); New York, New York, U.S.

Career information
- College: West Virginia

Career history
- Temple (1995–1996) Graduate assistant; Colby (1997) Linebackers coach; Bloomsburg (1998–2003) Linebackers coach & special teams coordinator; Kutztown (2004–2005) Defensive coordinator & defensive backs coach; Lafayette (2006–2008) Defensive line coach; New York Giants (2009–2010) Defensive quality control coach; New York Giants (2011–2012) Defensive assistant; Carolina Panthers (2013–2017) Linebackers coach; Arizona Cardinals (2018) Defensive coordinator & assistant head coach; Cleveland Browns (2019) Linebackers coach & run game coordinator; Carolina Panthers (2020–2022) Interim defensive coordinator/Assistant head coach, Defense; Buffalo Bills (2023) Senior defensive assistant; Buffalo Bills (2024–2025) Linebackers coach; Las Vegas Raiders (2026–present) Senior Defensive Assistant

Awards and highlights
- Super Bowl champion (XLVI)
- Coaching profile at Pro Football Reference

Al Holcomb (born October 22, 1970) is an American football coach who is the Senior Defensive Assistant for the Las Vegas Raiders of the National Football League (NFL). He previously served as the interim defensive coordinator for the Carolina Panthers and as an assistant coach for the Cleveland Browns, Arizona Cardinals, New York Giants, and Buffalo Bills.

== Early career ==
Holcomb started his coaching career as a graduate assistant at Temple from 1995 to 1996, helping with linebackers. Holcomb worked as linebackers coach, assistant track coach and physical education instructor at Colby College in 1997.

Holcomb spent six years from 1998 to 2003 at Bloomsburg University as linebackers coach and special teams coordinator. From 2004 to 2005, he coached at Kutztown University, serving as the defensive coordinator and defensive backs coach in addition to being the interim head coach in the winter of 2005.

Holcomb oversaw the defensive line at Lafayette from 2006 to 2008. Under his tutelage, five different defensive linemen claimed All-Patriot League honors. During his final season in 2008, the Leopards led the conference in several defensive categories, including total defense and scoring defense. In his first season in 2006, Holcomb contributed to a unit that finished first in the Football Championship Subdivision in total defense, fourth in rushing defense and eighth in scoring defense.

== Professional coaching career ==
=== New York Giants ===
In 2009, Holcomb joined the New York Giants as the defensive quality control coach. Two years later, he was promoted to defensive assistant to Perry Fewell and won a Super Bowl ring with the Giants in Super Bowl XLVI.

=== Carolina Panthers (first stint) ===
On January 26, 2013, Holcomb was hired as the linebackers coach for the Carolina Panthers. He was Pro Football Focus's first runner-up to their Linebackers Coach of the Year award.

In the 2015 season, Holcomb and the Panthers reached Super Bowl 50, but the Panthers fell to the Denver Broncos by a score of 24–10.

=== Arizona Cardinals ===
On January 26, 2018, Holcomb was hired as defensive coordinator for the Arizona Cardinals. He was fired on December 31, 2018, along with head coach Steve Wilks.

=== Cleveland Browns ===
On January 16, 2019, Holcomb was hired as linebackers coach and run game coordinator by the Cleveland Browns.

=== Carolina Panthers (second stint) ===
On January 19, 2020, Holcomb returned to the Panthers and was hired as their defensive run game coordinator.

The Panthers were selected to coach in the 2021 Senior Bowl, but linebackers coach Mike Siravo missed the game due to COVID-19 protocols, so Holcomb took over his duties in the game.

=== Buffalo Bills ===
On February 8, 2023, the Buffalo Bills hired Holcomb as a senior defensive assistant. On February 2, 2024, he was appointed as linebackers coach.

=== Las Vegas Raiders ===
On February 18, 2026, the Raiders hired Holcomb as a senior defensive assistant under new head coach Klint Kubiak.
