= David Diehl =

American football player

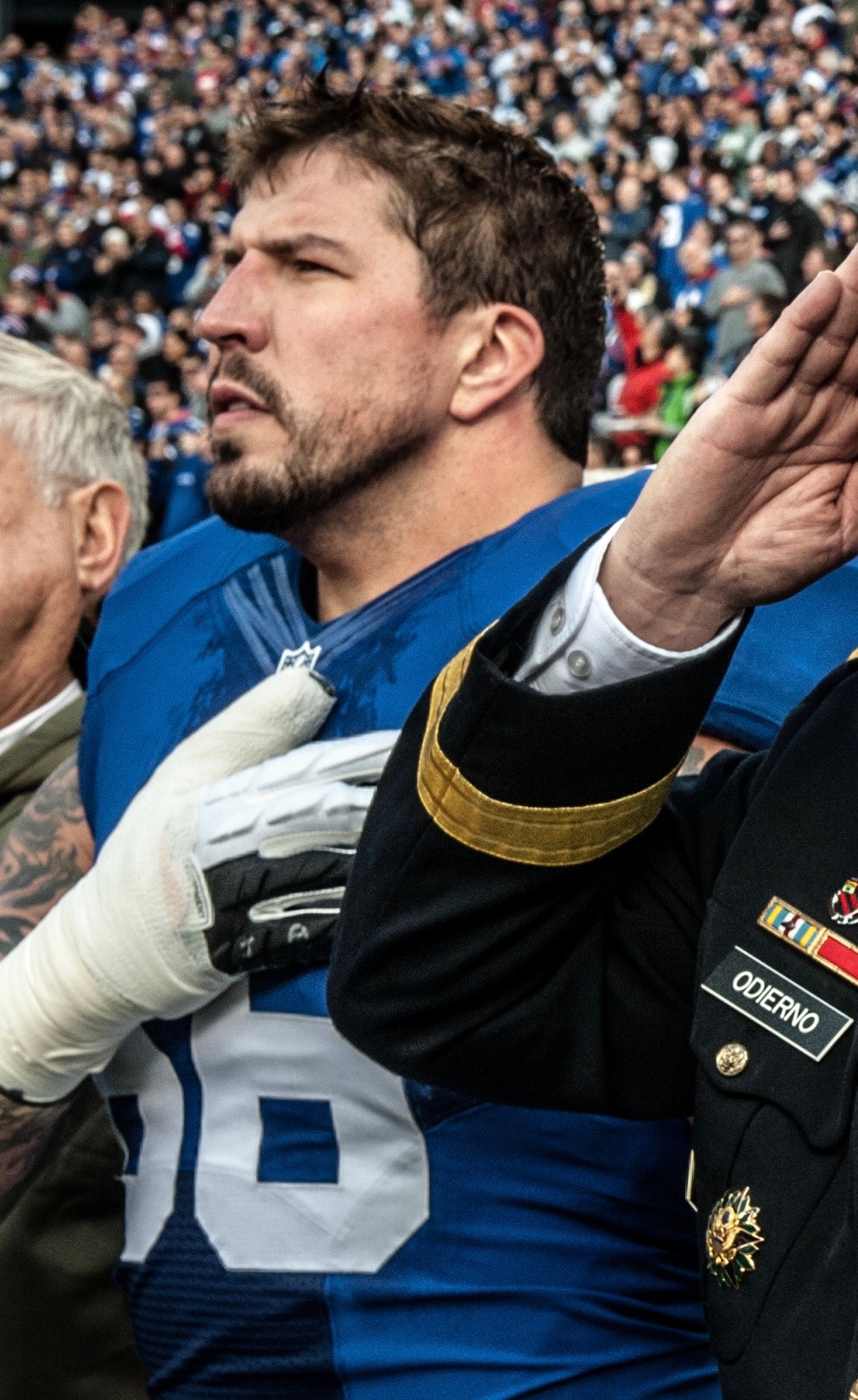
- Diehl with the New York Giants in 2013

Memphis Tigers
- Title: Assistant offensive line coach

Personal information
- Born: September 15, 1980 (age 46); Chicago, Illinois, U.S.
- Listed height: 6 ft 6 in (1.98 m)
- Listed weight: 310 lb (141 kg)

Career information
- High school: Brother Rice (Chicago)
- College: Illinois (1998–2002)
- NFL draft: 2003: 5th round, 160th overall pick

Career history

Playing
- New York Giants (2003–2013)

Coaching
- Memphis (2022–2023) Offensive quality control coach; Memphis (2024–present) Assistant offensive line coach

Awards and highlights
- 2× Super Bowl champion (XLII, XLVI); Second-team All-Pro (2008); Pro Bowl (2009); 52nd greatest New York Giant of all-time; Second-team All-Big Ten (2002)

Career NFL statistics
- Games played: 164
- Games started: 160
- Fumble recoveries: 11
- Stats at Pro Football Reference

David Michael Diehl (/ˈdiːl/; born September 15, 1980) is a Croatian-German college football coach and former professional player who spent his entire career as an offensive lineman with the New York Giants of the National Football League (NFL). He is the assistant offensive line coach for the University of Memphis, a position he has held since 2024. He was the Giants starting left tackle on two Super Bowl championship teams. He played college football for the Illinois Fighting Illini. The Giants selected him in the fifth round of the 2003 NFL draft.

== Early life ==
Diehl was born in Chicago, Illinois, on September 15, 1980. He is of Croatian descent on his mother's side, and of German descent on his father's side. When he was younger Diehl and his family frequently visited local Croatian churches and clubs in Chicago. He strengthened his Croatian-American ties after he moved to New Jersey, where the local Croatian community often have him as a visitor. He has the Croatian coat of arms as well as "neuništiv", the Croatian word for indestructible, tattooed on his left arm.

Diehl attended Catholic schools, including St. Linus Grammar School in Oak Lawn, Illinois, and Brother Rice High School in Chicago, where he starred on the football, wrestling, and track teams.

== College career ==
Diehl attended the University of Illinois at Urbana–Champaign, where he played for the Illinois Fighting Illini football team. He became a second-team All-Big Ten Conference selection as a senior in 2002. Recipient of the Wright Commitment to Excellence Award, presented to the Illinois player who has dedicated himself to academic excellence despite obstacles faced during his collegiate career. Started every game at left offensive guard, registering 91 knockdowns for an offense that featured its first 1,000-yard rusher (Antoineo Harris) and 1,000-yard receiver (Brandon Lloyd) in the same season since 1984. Helped offense total 5,356 yards. In 2001, saw action at both guard and tackle. Registered 56 knockdowns as he participated in 385 plays for an offense that gained 5,041 yards as the line allowed only 16 quarterback sacks (second in the Big Ten). In 2000, was valuable reserve, seeing action in every game at right guard. Made 15 knockdowns as he participated in 43 plays. In 1999: Played in 6 games on the field goal and extra point protection units. He was redshirted as a freshman in 1998.

== Professional career ==
Pre-draft measurables
Height	Weight	Arm length	Hand span	40-yard dash	10-yard split	20-yard split	20-yard shuttle	Three-cone drill	Vertical jump	Broad jump	Bench press
6 ft 5 3/4 in (1.97 m)	310 lb (141 kg)	33 3/4 in (0.86 m)	11 1/4 in (0.29 m)	5.32 s	1.83 s	3.07 s	4.97 s	8.10 s	28.0 in (0.71 m)	8 ft 0 in (2.44 m)	22 reps
All values from NFL Combine

Diehl was drafted by the Giants in the fifth round of the 2003 NFL draft with the 160th overall selection.

In his rookie season, Diehl started all 16 games, becoming the first Giants rookie to do so since Mark Bavaro in 1985. He was one of 14 NFL rookies to start all 16 games in 2003 and was the only rookie to start at the same position (right guard) each game during the 2003 season.

In 2005, Diehl played another position, starting 15 regular season games at left guard and 1 game at right tackle. That season, Tiki Barber rushed for a franchise-record 1,860 yards, and Eli Manning passed for 3,762 yards, the 5th-highest total in franchise history.

The Giants signed Diehl to a six-year, $31 million contract in May 2008.

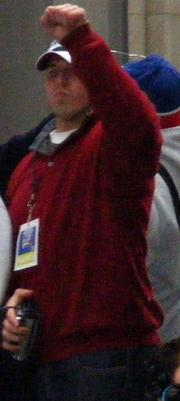
Diehl at the Super Bowl Parade in February 2008

At the end of the 2009 season, Diehl was elected to the 2010 Pro Bowl as a Super Bowl Participant replacement.

Diehl moved from left tackle to right tackle following the release of Rich Seubert and Shaun O'Hara and the signing of David Baas. He had started every game of his NFL career until 2010, when he tore his hamstring and suffered a partially dislocated hip.

At the end of the 2011 season, Diehl and the Giants appeared in Super Bowl XLVI. He started in the game as the Giants defeated the New England Patriots by a score of 21–17.

On August 21, 2013, the New York Giants announced that Diehl will undergo surgery to repair his injured right thumb. The recovery time was expected to be approximately six weeks. On January 24, 2014, Diehl announced his retirement after 11 seasons.

== Broadcasting ==
On August 6, 2014, it was announced Diehl had been hired to work as a color analyst for NFL games on Fox. He teamed with Thom Brennaman as the number #4 team on these telecasts for 2014. During the 2015 season, Diehl worked fewer regular season games because former lead college football on Fox analyst Charles Davis took his place alongside Brennaman. (It was supposed to be Donovan McNabb, but he was arrested for a DUI in July 2015, leading Fox to make this change. Joel Klatt replaced Davis on college football telecasts with Davis's former partner, Gus Johnson). Diehl would move two spots down to the number #6 team to team with Dick Stockton and replacing Stockton's former partners Brady Quinn, Kirk Morrison, and McNabb. For the 2016 and 2017 seasons, Diehl moved down to the #7 crew, where he was teamed with Sam Rosen. In 2017, Diehl joined CBS Sports Network as a college football analyst.

== Coaching career ==
In May 2022, Diehl announced that he would be joining the coaching staff at Memphis, working for head coach Ryan Silverfield as an offensive analyst. This is Diehl's first collegiate coaching position.

== Personal life ==
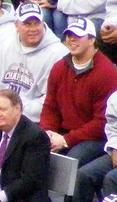
Diehl during the Giants Super Bowl XLII rally at Giants stadium.

Diehl is of mixed German and Croatian descent. His Croat origins are from his maternal grandparents. His grandmother, Lucija Semanic (born Lucia Šamanić) was born in the US to parents from Krk in Croatia, while his grandfather, Ante Bekavac, emigrated to United States from Lovreć. He has a tattoo of the Croatian coat of arms on his left arm. Diehl stated his favorite tattoo is his Croatian coat of arms. He visited Croatia in June and July 2011, in search of his roots.

Diehl played at the University of Illinois, and is a fan of the university's former symbol, Chief Illiniwek. During player introductions on TV, he states his school as "University of Chief Illiniwek." He also has an image of Chief Illiniwek tattooed on his arm.

Diehl received the Wellington Mara NFL Man of the Year Award May 22, 2012, at the annual Boys Hope Girls Hope Dinner.

On the morning of June 11, 2012, Diehl was arrested for suspicion of drunk driving after hitting several parked cars. Diehl was purportedly watching a Croatian soccer game with friends at a bar in Astoria, Queens, NY.
