= Zak DeOssie =

American football player (born 1984)

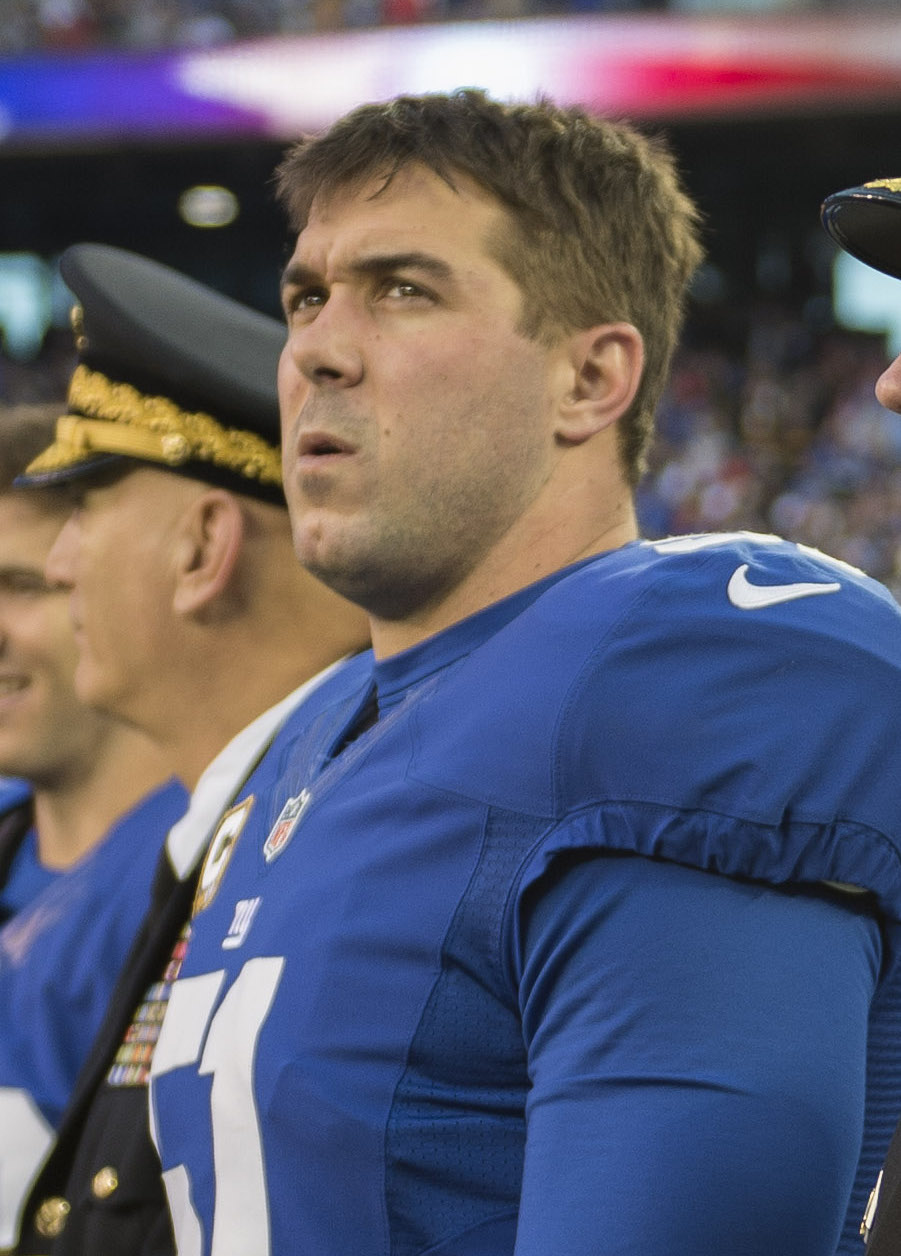
- DeOssie with the New York Giants in 2012

No. 51
- Position: Long snapper

Personal information
- Born: May 25, 1984 (age 42); North Andover, Massachusetts, U.S.
- Listed height: 6 ft 4 in (1.93 m)
- Listed weight: 248 lb (112 kg)

Career information
- High school: Phillips (Andover, Massachusetts)
- College: Brown (2003–2006)
- NFL draft: 2007: 4th round, 116th overall pick

Career history
- New York Giants (2007–2019)

Awards and highlights
- 2× Super Bowl champion (XLII, XLVI); 2× Pro Bowl (2008, 2010); 3× First-team All-Ivy League (2004–2006)

Career NFL statistics
- Games played: 199
- Total tackles: 87
- Forced fumbles: 1
- Fumble recoveries: 1
- Stats at Pro Football Reference

Zackary Robert DeOssie (dee-AH-see; born May 25, 1984) is an American former professional football player who was a long snapper for the New York Giants of the National Football League (NFL). DeOssie played college football for the Brown Bears as a linebacker, which was the position he was selected as by the Giants during the fourth round of the 2007 NFL draft. DeOssie would change positions after the team needed an emergency long snapper midway during his rookie season and remained there for the rest of his career. DeOssie was a two-time Pro Bowl selection and two-time Super Bowls champion with the Giants in Super Bowl XLII and Super Bowl XLVI, both against the New England Patriots. He is the son of former NFL linebacker Steve DeOssie; the two hold the distinction of being the first father-son duo to win Super Bowls with the same franchise.

== Early life ==
DeOssie attended Phillips Academy Andover in Massachusetts where he was named to the All-New England Prep Team. He also lettered in basketball and captained both the varsity basketball and football teams during his senior year.

== College career ==
DeOssie played in 36 games with 29 starts at Brown and recorded 315 tackles (187 solos) with 10.5 sacks, 36.5 stops for losses, 5 quarterback pressures, 5 forced fumbles, 11 deflected passes and 1 blocked kick and 4 interceptions for 60 yards in returns. He was a two-time I-AA All-American at Brown and was twice among the finalists for the Buck Buchanan Award, which goes to the nation's top FCS defensive player. As a senior in 2006, was a First-team All-America by The NFL Draft Report, earning 3rd-team honors from the Associated Press. As a senior, he was a First-team All-Ivy League for the third consecutive season, he started all 10 games at strongside inside linebacker and he led the Bears with a career-high 110 tackles including 68 solo stops. As a junior, he led Brown with 80 tackles, 12 tackles for a loss, 5 quarterback sacks, one interception, one blocked kick and three forced fumbles despite missing three games and was a First-team All-Ivy League selection. The prior year, as a sophomore, he was a First-Team All-Ivy selection. He made 98 tackles and intercepted a pass.

== Professional career ==
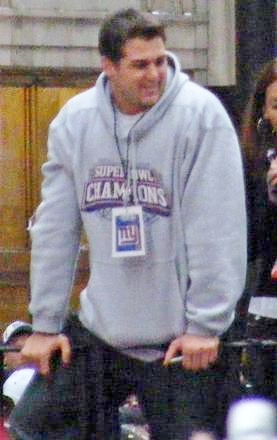
DeOssie at Super Bowl XLII victory parade

DeOssie became the first player in Brown's history to be invited to NFL Scouting Combine in 2007 and was the only Ivy league player invited that season. His 4.58-second 40-yard dash was eighth-fastest among all linebackers - a factor that significantly boosted his draft stock. His 26 repetitions of 225 pounds on the bench press was the fifth-best for a linebacker. He had a 34½" vertical leap, a 10'2" broad jump, a 4.00 in the short shuttle, and a 6.89 in the three-cone drill and scored a 24 on the Wonderlic.

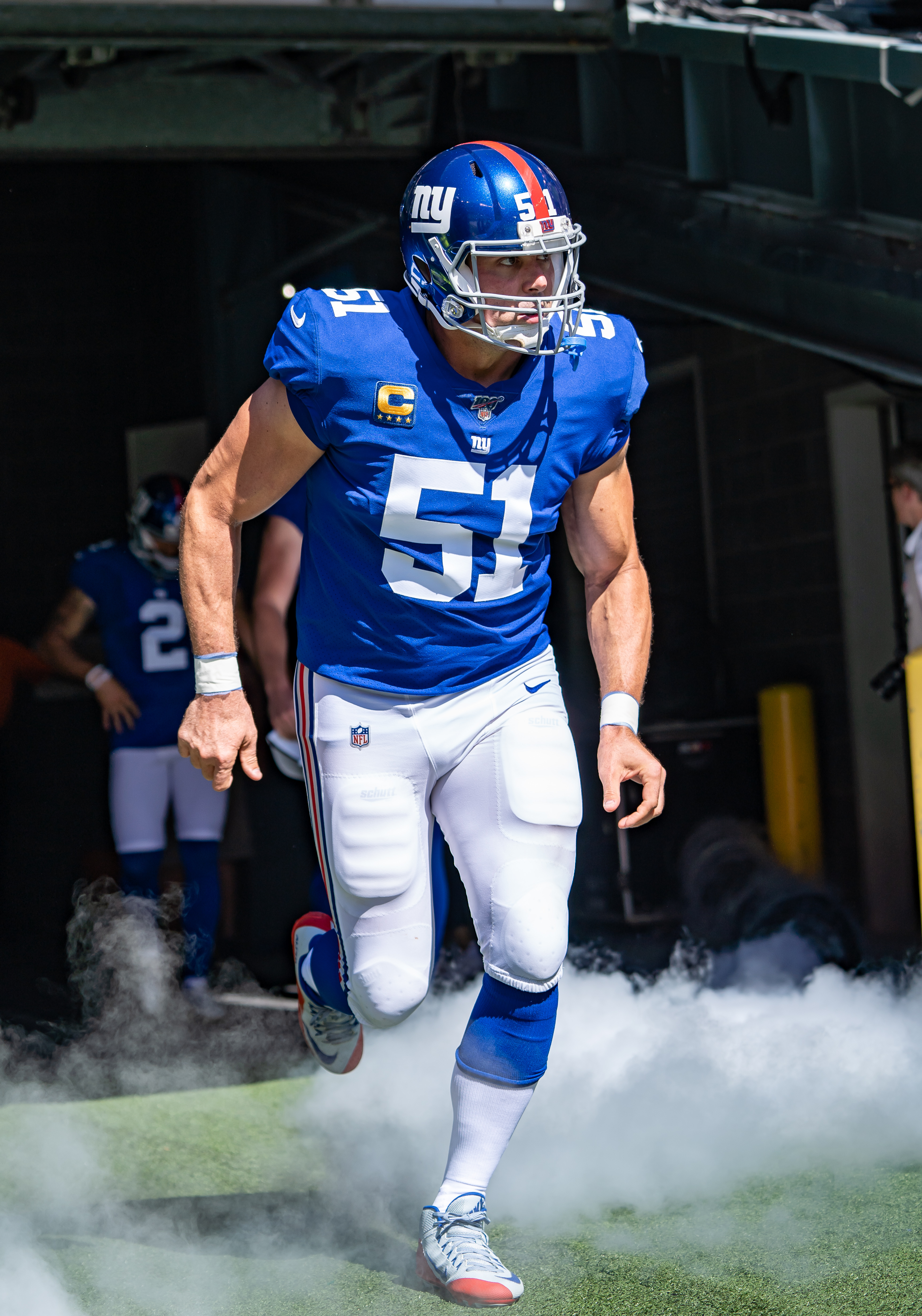
DeOssie in a game against the Washington Redskins

DeOssie was selected in the fourth round (116th overall) of the 2007 NFL draft by the New York Giants. He mostly played on special teams during his rookie season, taking over as the long snapper when starter Ryan Kuehl was placed on injured reserve midway through the year. He finished with six tackles for the season as the Giants won Super Bowl XLII. DeOssie played an extended role on defense in 2008 after Mathias Kiwanuka moved from outside linebacker to defensive end. He continued to share the long snapping duties with Jay Alford and was chosen by Philadelphia Eagles head coach Andy Reid as a need player in the 2009 Pro Bowl.

In 2008, DeOssie played in all 16 games and the NFC Divisional Playoff Game against Philadelphia. He served as the long snapper and finished 3rd on the team in special team tackles with 13. For the 2011 season, he, was selected as the special teams captain. On January 22, 2012, the Giants won the National Conference title with an overtime win against the San Francisco 49ers on a field goal breaking the 17–17 tie. They defeated the New England Patriots in Super Bowl XLVI in Indianapolis. On September 2, 2012, he was chosen as one of the three captains for the Giants.

On December 8, 2015, DeOssie was placed on season-ending injured reserve due to a wrist injury. Prior to being placed on injured reserve, he had played in 140 consecutive games for the Giants, having not missed a single game since being drafted in 2007.

On February 24, 2017, DeOssie signed a two-year contract extension with the Giants.

On March 12, 2019, DeOssie re-signed with the Giants. He was placed on injured reserve on November 30, 2019.

On August 7, 2020, DeOssie announced his retirement from the NFL after 13 seasons.

== Personal life ==
DeOssie is the son of Dianna and Steve DeOssie. His father is a former NFL player who was a member of the Giants' Super Bowl XXV-winning team. As a result of the Giants' win in Super Bowl XLII, the DeOssies became the first father-son duo to win a Super Bowl as members of the same franchise. Growing up in North Andover, Massachusetts, DeOssie was a New England Patriots fan and served as a ball boy.

Zak has a twin sister, Christina, who works at the Dana–Farber Cancer Institute, as well as an older sister, Nichole, who is a regional manager for pet retailer Hollywood Feed. He is married to Kate Hammond DeOssie, whom he met at Brown. The couple live in Summit, New Jersey and have two sons, Lukas and Blake.
