= 2006 Tennessee Titans season =

47th season in franchise history

- Owner: Bud Adams
- General manager: Floyd Reese
- Head coach: Jeff Fisher
- Home stadium: LP Field

Results
- Record: 8–8
- Division place: 2nd AFC South
- Playoffs: Did not qualify
- All-Pros: none
- Pro Bowlers: QB Vince Young

The 2006 Tennessee Titans season was the franchise's 47th season overall, 37th with the National Football League (NFL), and tenth in Tennessee. The season began with the Titans trying to improve on the 4–12 record from their 2005 season. The team improved to 8–8, but missed the playoffs for the third consecutive season.

The Titans signed Pittsburgh Steelers safety Chris Hope, Indianapolis Colts linebacker David Thornton, New England Patriots wide receiver David Givens, New York Jets center Kevin Mawae, Oakland Raiders quarterback Kerry Collins, and brought back defensive tackle Robaire Smith after he was released by the Houston Texans.

The Titans, with the third 2006 overall pick, chose Vince Young, star quarterback out of the University of Texas, and with their second round pick, picked USC running back LenDale White. Then, they used the rest of their picks on Penn St. Safety Calvin Lowry, North Carolina St. LB Stephen Tulloch, Miami University (OH) LB Terna Nande, Tennessee DT Jesse Mahelona, Wisconsin WR Jonathan Orr, Samford corner Cortland Finnegan, Utah LB Spencer Toone, and Utah RB Quinton Ganther.

However, the Titans were winless for five consecutive games before winning their first game against the Redskins in week 6.

This was also the final season where Floyd Reese was general manager for the Titans as he resigned following the season.

== Offseason ==
=== NFL draft ===
2006 Tennessee Titans draft
Round	Pick	Player	Position	College	Notes
1	3	Vince Young *	Quarterback	Texas	
2	45	LenDale White	Running back	USC	from Philadelphia
4	102	Calvin Lowry	Safety	Penn State	
4	116	Stephen Tulloch	Linebacker	NC State	from Philadelphia via Dallas
5	137	Terna Nande	Linebacker	Miami (OH)	
5	169	Jesse Mahelona	Defensive tackle	Tennessee	
6	172	Jonathan Orr	Wide receiver	Wisconsin	
7	125	Cortland Finnegan *	Cornerback	Samford	
7	245	Spencer Toone	Linebacker	Utah	
7	246	Quinton Ganther	Running back	Utah	
Made roster * Made at least one Pro Bowl during career

=== Undrafted free agents ===
2006 undrafted free agents of note
Player	Position	College
Ahmard Hall	Fullback	Texas
Colin Allred	Linebacker	Baylor
Sean Conover	Defensive end	Bucknell
Jamie Petrowski	Tight end	Indiana State

== Personnel ==
=== Staff ===
2006 Tennessee Titans staff
Front office: Founder/owner/chairman of the board/president/CEO – Bud Adams; Executive VP/general manager/director of football operations – Floyd Reese; Director of player personnel – Rich Snead; Director of college scouting – Mike Ackerley; National coordinator of college scouting – C. O. Brocato; Director of pro scouting – Al Smith; Head coaches: Executive vice president/head coach – Jeff Fisher; Assistant head coach/linebackers – Dave McGinnis; Offensive coaches: Offensive coordinator – Norm Chow; Quarterbacks – Craig Johnson; Running backs – Sherman Smith; Wide receivers – Ray Sherman; Offensive line – Mike Munchak; Offensive assistant/quality control – Ned James	Defensive coaches: Defensive coordinator – Jim Schwartz; Defensive line - Jim Washburn; Defensive backs – Everett Withers; Safeties and nickel backs – Chuck Cecil; Special teams coaches: Special teams – Alan Lowry; Assistant special teams – Marty Galbraith; Strength and conditioning: Strength and conditioning – Steve Watterson

=== Roster ===
2006 Tennessee Titans roster
Quarterbacks (QB): 5 Kerry Collins; 10 Vince Young; Running backs (RB): 29 Chris Brown; 48 Casey Cramer FB; 45 Ahmard Hall FB; 20 Travis Henry; 25 LenDale White; Wide receivers (WR): 83 Drew Bennett; 81 Brandon Jones; 14 Jonathan Orr; 82 Courtney Roby; 19 Bobby Wade; 86 Roydell Williams; Tight ends (TE): 47 Ben Hartsock; 80 Bo Scaife; 89 Cooper Wallace	Offensive linemen (OL): 54 Eugene Amano C; 60 Jacob Bell G; 73 Justin Geisinger G; 68 Kevin Mawae C; 75 Benji Olson G; 71 Michael Roos T; 76 David Stewart T; 72 Seth Wand T; Defensive linemen (DL): 97 Tony Brown DT; 77 Sean Conover DE; 92 Albert Haynesworth DT; 91 Travis LaBoy DE; 94 Jesse Mahelona DT; 95 Josh Savage DE; 96 Robaire Smith DT; 90 Randy Starks DT; 93 Kyle Vanden Bosch DE	Linebackers (LB): 52 Colby Bockwoldt OLB; 53 Keith Bulluck OLB; 57 Terna Nande OLB; 59 Peter Sirmon MLB; 50 David Thornton OLB; 55 Stephen Tulloch MLB; 49 LeVar Woods OLB; Defensive backs (DB): 31 Cortland Finnegan CB; 22 Vincent Fuller FS; 21 Reynaldo Hill CB; 24 Chris Hope SS; 32 Adam Jones CB; 30 Eric King CB; 37 Calvin Lowry FS; 23 Donnie Nickey SS; 28 Lamont Thompson FS; 26 Andre Woolfolk CB; Special teams (ST): 58 Ken Amato LS; 2 Rob Bironas K; 15 Craig Hentrich P	Practice squad: 35 Quinton Ganther RB; 41 Antoine Harris CB; 8 Matt Mauck QB; 85 Jamie Petrowski TE; 16 Richie Ross WR; 61 Isaac Snell G; 56 Spencer Toone OLB; Reserve: 87 David Givens WR (IR); 88 Erron Kinney TE (IR); 99 Rien Long DT (IR); 70 Daniel Loper OT (IR); 98 Antwan Odom DE (IR); 69 Zach Piller G (IR); 51 Robert Reynolds LB (IR); 84 Ben Troupe TE (IR); 36 Michael Waddell CB (NF-Inj.); 79 Marcus White DT (IR); Rookies in italics 53 active, 10 reserve, 7 practice squad

== Schedule ==
=== Preseason ===
Week	Date	Opponent	Result	Record
1	August 12	New Orleans Saints	**L** 16–19	0–1
2	August 19	at Denver Broncos	**L** 10–35	0–2
3	August 26	Atlanta Falcons	**L** 6–20	0–3
4	September 1	at Green Bay Packers	**W** 35–21	1–3

=== Regular season ===
Apart from their regular games with AFC South division rivals, the Titans played against the AFC East and NFC East according to the NFL's schedule rotation, and also played against the Ravens and the Chargers, who in 2005 had like the Titans each finished third in their division.

Week	Date	Opponent	Result	Record	Attendance
1	September 10	New York Jets	L 16–23	0–1	69,143
2	September 17	at San Diego Chargers	L 7–40	0–2	64,344
3	September 24	at Miami Dolphins	L 10–13	0–3	72,733
4	October 1	Dallas Cowboys	L 14–45	0–4	69,143
5	October 8	at **Indianapolis Colts**	L 13–14	0–5	57,021
6	October 15	at Washington Redskins	W 25–22	1–5	88,550
7	Bye				
8	October 29	**Houston Texans**	W 28–22	2–5	69,143
9	November 5	at **Jacksonville Jaguars**	L 7–37	2–6	66,524
10	November 12	Baltimore Ravens	L 26–27	2–7	69,143
11	November 19	at Philadelphia Eagles	W 31–13	3–7	69,232
12	November 26	New York Giants	W 24–21	4–7	69,143
13	December 3	**Indianapolis Colts**	W 20–17	5–7	69,143
14	December 10	at **Houston Texans**	W 26–20 (OT)	6–7	70,760
15	December 17	**Jacksonville Jaguars**	W 24–17	7–7	69,143
16	December 24	at Buffalo Bills	W 30–29	8–7	54,765
17	December 31	New England Patriots	L 23–40	8–8	69,143

Note: Intra-division opponents are in bold text.

== Standings ==
AFC South
	W	L	T	PCT	DIV	CONF	PF	PA	STK
^{(3)} Indianapolis Colts	12	4	0	.750	3–3	9–3	427	360	W1
Tennessee Titans	8	8	0	.500	4–2	5–7	324	400	L1
Jacksonville Jaguars	8	8	0	.500	2–4	5–7	371	274	L3
Houston Texans	6	10	0	.375	3–3	6–6	267	366	W2

== Regular season ==
=== Week 1: vs. New York Jets ===
	1	2	3	4	Total
Jets	0	13	3	7	23
Titans	0	0	0	16	16

at LP Field, Nashville, Tennessee

The Titans opened the regular season at home against the New York Jets on September 10. After a scoreless first quarter, the Titans started to seriously trail as opposing RB Kevan Barlow scored on a one-yard TD run (extra point attempt was good) and an 8-yard TD pass to opposing WR Jerricho Cotchery (extra point attempt failed). In the third quarter, things didn't get any better, as opposing kicker Mike Nugent kicked an 18-yard field goal to make Tennessee trail 16–0. In the fourth quarter, the Titans made a valiant attempt to come back, as RB Travis Henry got a 3-yard and a 1-yard TD run, which were both followed by successful two-point conversions. However, the Jets were just too much as opposing TE Chris Baker caught a 12-yard TD to put the game away. With the loss, the Titans began their season 0–1.

=== Week 2: at San Diego Chargers ===
	1	2	3	4	Total
Titans	0	0	0	7	7
Chargers	3	17	6	14	40

at Qualcomm Stadium, San Diego, California

In Week 2, the Titans played their first road game of the year against the San Diego Chargers. From the get-go, the Titans trailed as opposing kicker Nate Kaeding kicked a 28-yard field goal in the first quarter. Things only got worse in the second quarter, as San Diego unleashed their ultimate weapon, RB LaDainian Tomlinson, as he got a 4-yard and an 8-yard TD run and Kaeding got a 31-yard field goal to give Tennessee a 20–0 halftime deficit. Things weren't any better in the third quarter, as Kaeding got a 35 and a 44-yard field goal for San Diego. In the fourth quarter, the game was put well out of reach as opposing QB Philip Rivers completed a 12-yard TD pass to WR Vincent Jackson. By this time, QB Kerry Collins was taken out and rookie QB Vince Young came in to complete an 18-yard pass to WR Drew Bennett. However, the Chargers delivered one more blow as opposing QB Charlie Whitehurst ran 14 yards for the game's final TD. With the loss, the Titans fell to 0–2.

=== Week 3: at Miami Dolphins ===
	1	2	3	4	Total
Titans	0	7	3	0	10
Dolphins	3	0	7	3	13

at Dolphin Stadium, Miami Gardens, Florida

Staying on the road, the Titans traveled to Dolphin Stadium for a Week 3 contest against the Miami Dolphins. From the get-go, the Titans trailed as kicker Olindo Mare got a 40-yard field goal. The Titans took the lead before halftime as QB Kerry Collins completed a 27-yard TD pass to TE Bo Scaife in the second quarter. However, in the third quarter, the Dolphins retook the lead as QB Daunte Culpepper got a touchdown on a 5-yard QB sneak. Titans kicker Rob Bironas tied the game up on a 22-yard field goal. In the fourth quarter, the Dolphins walked away with their first win as Mare booted a 39-yard field goal to drop the Titans to 0–3.

=== Week 4: vs. Dallas Cowboys ===
	1	2	3	4	Total
Cowboys	7	7	14	17	45
Titans	3	3	8	0	14

at LP Field, Nashville, Tennessee |Weather=82 °F or 27.8 °C (Sunny)

Back at home, the Dallas Cowboys traveled to Nashville to face off against the Titans. The Titans started their rookie quarterback Vince Young after veteran Kerry Collins produced dismal results after the first 3 games of the season. The Titans were able to score with a field goal on their opening drive making it the first time this season that they were able to score in the first quarter. The Titans were held to two field goals in the first half while the Cowboys had a lead at halftime with two 13-yard TD passes from Drew Bledsoe to WR Terry Glenn to put them up 14–6.

The Cowboys continued to drive up the score during the 3rd quarter with a 5-yard touchdown run by RB Julius Jones. During this play Titans' DT Albert Haynesworth stepped on the face of Cowboys center Andre Gurode. Haynesworth was flagged for Unsportsmanlike Conduct and ejected from the game. He protested his ejection by taking off his helmet and throwing it on the ground. He was then flagged again with another Unsportsmanlike Conduct penalty. Gurode left the field with an ice pack to his face and required stitched above his left eye. He did not return to the field. Head Coach Jeff Fisher as well as Haynesworth later apologized for his actions. Vince Young connected for his second touchdown of the year to TE Ben Troupe. During the 4th quarter, the Cowboys scored on a field goal by Mike Vanderjagt. LB Brady James intercepted Vince Young's pass intended for Ben Troupe and returned it for a touchdown. The Cowboys sealed the win with a 7-yard TD run by Tyson Thompson with a final score of 45 to 14. The Cowboys moved to 2 and 1 while the Titans continued to losing streak dropping to 0–4.

=== Week 5: at Indianapolis Colts ===
	1	2	3	4	Total
Titans	7	3	3	0	13
Colts	0	0	7	7	14

at the RCA Dome, Indianapolis, Indiana

Hoping to get their first win of the year, the Titans traveled to the RCA Dome for Week 5, as they played an AFC South match-up with the Indianapolis Colts. The Titans got off to a surprising start, as QB Vince Young ran 19 yards for a touchdown. Tennessee followed it up in the second quarter, as kicker Rob Bironas kicked a 22-yard field goal to give the Titans a 10–0 halftime lead. In the third quarter, Tennessee got an unpleasant wake-up call, as Colts QB Peyton Manning completed a 13-yard TD pass to WR Marvin Harrison. The Titans got another field goal, as Bironas kicked a 47-yarder. Tennessee remained winless on the year, as Manning completed a 2-yard TD pass to WR Reggie Wayne in the fourth quarter. With their loss, the Titans continued to stay at the bottom of the AFC South at 0–5.

=== Week 6: at Washington Redskins ===
	1	2	3	4	Total
Titans	3	10	9	3	25
Redskins	7	7	0	8	22

at FedExField, Landover, Maryland

The Titans won their first game of the year, and Vince Young earned his first NFL win in a game against the Washington Redskins at FedExField.

The Titans got on the board first as K Rob Bironas connected on a 32-yard field goal five minutes into the game. The Skins responded with a 10-yard touchdown run by RB Clinton Portis. On the first play of the second quarter, Skins QB Mark Brunell hit TE Chris Cooley with a 24-yard touchdown pass. Titans K Bironas converted a 26-yard field goal, and Young hit WR Brandon Jones with a 3-yard touchdown near the end of the first half, to pull the Titans to within one going into halftime. Titans RB Travis Henry rushed for a career-high 178 yards and scored on a 2-yard run in the third quarter. On the Skins next possession, Titans FB Casey Cramer blocked a Derrick Frost punt out of the end zone for a safety. Skins RB Portis ran for his second touchdown early in the fourth quarter, and Brunell hit WR Santana Moss for the two-point conversion to tie the game at 22. Titans K Bironas kicked a field goal from 30 yards out with 5 minutes left to give them a 25–22 lead. The Skins had one last chance but Brunell threw an interception to S Lamont Thompson to seal the deal for the Titans. With the win, the Titans went into their bye week at 1–5.

=== Week 8: vs. Houston Texans ===
	1	2	3	4	Total
Texans	0	3	7	12	22
Titans	0	14	7	7	28

at LP Field, Nashville, Tennessee |Weather=74 °F or 23.3 °C (Sunny)

Coming off their Bye Week, the Titans went home for an AFC South battle with the Houston Texans. After a scoreless first quarter, Titans QB Vince Young started the scoring with a 20-yard TD run. Afterwards, Texans kicker Kris Brown kicked a 27-yard field goal. Tennessee struckback with DE Tony Brown returning a fumble 40 yards for a touchdown. In the third quarter, Young completed a 20-yard TD pass to WR Bobby Wade, while Houston QB Sage Rosenfels (who replaced starting QB David Carr early in the quarter) completed a 10-yard TD pass to WR Andre Johnson. In the fourth quarter, Adam "Pacman" Jones helped the Titans boost their lead by returning a punt 53 yards for a touchdown. The Texans fought back, as Rosenfels completed a 1-yard TD pass to rookie TE Owen Daniels (Extra Point Attempt Failed) and a 2-yard TD pass to Daniels (2-Point Attempt Failed). In the end, Tennessee had consecutive victories, and improved to 2–5.

=== Week 9: at Jacksonville Jaguars ===
	1	2	3	4	Total
Titans	0	0	0	7	7
Jaguars	14	6	17	0	37

at Alltel Stadium, Jacksonville, Florida

Hoping to build on their recent victory over the Texans, the Titans flew to Alltel Stadium for an AFC South fight with the Jacksonville Jaguars. From the get-go, the Titans fell behind, as Jags QB David Garrard completed an 11-yard TD pass to WR Ernest Wilford and a 14-yard TD pass to TE George Wrighster in the first quarter. In the second quarter, Jaguars kicker Josh Scobee kicked a 47-yard and a 21-yard field goal in the second quarter, giving Jacksonville a 20–0 lead over Tennessee at halftime. In the third quarter, the Titans woes continued as Garrard hooked up with Wilford again on a 22-yard TD strike. Then, DB Scott Starks returned an interception 55 yards for a touchdown. Finally, Scobee kicked a 39-yard field goal, putting the game out of reach. In the fourth quarter, Tennessee got their only score of the game, as QB Vince Young completed a 32-yard TD pass to WR Drew Bennett. With the loss, the Titans fell to 2–6.

=== Week 10: vs. Baltimore Ravens ===
	1	2	3	4	Total
Ravens	7	10	0	10	27
Titans	12	14	0	0	26

at LP Field, Nashville, Tennessee |Weather=47 °F or 8.3 °C (Sunny)

Hoping to rebound from their road loss to the Jaguars, the Titans went home for a Week 10 fight, as QB Vince Young went up against his predecessor (Steve McNair) and the Baltimore Ravens. In the first quarter, the Titans scored first on a 21-yard field goal by kicker Rob Bironas. Afterward, McNair completed a 65-yard TD pass to WR Mark Clayton to give Baltimore the lead. Afterwards, Young got a 2-yard TD run to give Tennessee the lead, while DE Tony Brown sacked McNair in the end zone for a safety. In the second quarter, the Titans increased its lead with TE Bo Scaife getting a 13-yard TD run and RB Travis Henry getting a 1-yard TD run. However, the Ravens responded with McNair completing a 30-yard TD pass to FB Ovie Mughelli, followed up by kicker Matt Stover's 27-yard field goal. After a scoreless third quarter, Baltimore wrapped things up against Tennessee with Stover getting a 40-yard field goal and McNair completing an 11-yard TD pass to WR Derrick Mason. With the loss, the Titans fell to 2–7.

=== Week 11: at Philadelphia Eagles ===
	1	2	3	4	Total
Titans	7	3	14	7	31
Eagles	3	3	0	7	13

at Lincoln Financial Field, Philadelphia, Pennsylvania

Hoping to end their two-game skid, the Titans flew to Lincoln Financial Field for a Week 11 fight with the Philadelphia Eagles. In the first quarter, the Titans drew first blood as QB Vince Young completed a 14-yard TD pass to TE Ben Troupe. The Eagles responded with kicker David Akers making a 42-yard field goal. In the second quarter, Akers kicked a 38-yard field goal for Philadelphia, while kicker Rob Bironas got a 36-yard field goal for Tennessee as time ran out on the half. In the third quarter, the Titans offense went into overdrive, as RB Travis Henry ran 70-yards for a touchdown, while CB Pacman Jones returned a punt 90 yards for a touchdown. In the fourth quarter, even though QB Jeff Garcia completed a 5-yard touchdown pass to TE L.J. Smith, Tennessee managed to seal the deal with OLB Keith Bulluck returning a fumble 16 yards for a touchdown. With the win, the Titans improved to 3–7.

=== Week 12: vs New York Giants ===
	1	2	3	4	Total
Giants	7	14	0	0	21
Titans	0	0	0	24	24

at LP Field, Nashville, Tennessee |Weather=70 °F or 21.1 °C (Mostly Cloudy)

Trying to build on their road win over the Eagles, the Titans went home for a Week 12 fight with the New York Giants. In the first quarter, Tennessee trailed early as QB Eli Manning completed a 3-yard TD pass to WR Plaxico Burress for the only score of the period. In the second quarter, Giants RB Brandon Jacobs got a 10-yard and 4-yard TD run to give the Giants a seemingly comfy 21–0 halftime. After a scoreless third quarter, the Titans' improbable comeback began in the fourth quarter with 10 minutes remaining. QB Vince Young completed a TD pass to TE Bo Scaife. Afterwards, Young followed it up with a 1-yard TD run. The key play of the game came on a 4th and 10 from Tennessee's 24-yard line, when Giants DE Mathias Kiwanuka had Young in his grasp, but he let go thinking the quarterback had thrown the ball. Not wanting a roughing the passer penalty, it allowed Young to dash away for the first down. Four plays later, he completed a 14-yard TD pass to WR Brandon Jones. Afterwards, after Manning got intercepted for the second time by CB Pacman Jones, kicker Rob Bironas nailed a game-winning field goal it from 49 yards out. With the win, the Titans improved to 4–7.

=== Week 13: vs Indianapolis Colts ===
	1	2	3	4	Total
Colts	7	7	0	3	17
Titans	0	10	0	10	20

at LP Field, Nashville, Tennessee |Weather=41 °F or 5 °C (Mostly Cloudy)

After scratching off one Manning in one thriller, the Titans stayed at home for an AFC South rematch with their archrival Indianapolis Colts. In the first quarter, the Colts struck first with QB Peyton Manning completing a 68-yard TD pass to WR Marvin Harrison for the only score of the period. In the second quarter, Indianapolis increased its lead with RB Dominic Rhodes getting a 2-yard TD run. The Titans started to creep back into the game, with kicker Rob Bironas getting a 25-yard field goal, while QB Vince Young completed a 20-yard TD pass to WR Drew Bennett. After a scoreless third quarter, Tennessee took the lead with Young completing a 9-yard TD pass to WR Brandon Jones. The Colts tied the game with kicker Adam Vinatieri completing a 20-yard field goal. The Titans got the win on Bironas' 60-yard field goal, sealing the victory after lasting out the clock. The win boosted the Titans to an improbable possible playoff berth and ended Indianapolis' winning streak against the Titans at 7 games spanning 4 years. With wins over both Manning brothers, Tennessee improved to 5–7.

=== Week 14: at Houston Texans ===
	1	2	3	4	OT	Total
Titans	3	3	7	7	6	26
Texans	0	7	7	6	0	20

at Reliant Stadium, Houston, Texas

In Week 14, the Titans traveled to Reliant Stadium for an AFC South rematch with the Houston Texans in a homecoming for QB Vince Young. The Titans struck first, notching 6 points on two field goals by kicker Rob Bironas. The Texans scored next, however, when RB Ron Dayne plunged into the endzone from one-yard out for his first TD as a Texan. Dayne found the endzone again in the third quarter on a two-yard run to expand the lead to 8 points. Late in the same quarter, RB Travis Henry added his own rushing score and the Titans pulled to within one. Following a Young interception by CB Demarcus Faggins, kicker Kris Brown connected on a 49-yarder. Tennessee recaptured the lead on Henry's second score, but Brown tied the game with a 46 yarder forcing overtime. The Titans won the coin toss in overtime, and Young ended the game in dramatic fashion with a 39-yard TD run on a 3rd-and-14 early in the extra period. The Titans improved to 6–7 and remained mathematically eligible for a wildcard playoff berth.

=== Week 15: vs Jacksonville Jaguars ===
	1	2	3	4	Total
Jaguars	7	3	0	7	17
Titans	7	0	17	0	24

at LP Field, Nashville, Tennessee |Weather=72 °F or 22.2 °C (Sunny)

Titans got their fifth straight win as they play at home against the Jacksonville Jaguars.

In the first quarter, Pacman Jones intercepted a pass at Tennessee's 17-yard line and returns it 83 yards for a touchdown, bringing the Titans up 7–0. Later, Maurice Jones-Drew runs the ball 12 yards for a touchdown, tying the score 7–7.

In the second quarter, Jaguars kicker Josh Scobee made a 43-yard field goal, putting the Jaguars up 10–7 at halftime.

In the third quarter, the Titans managed to score 17 points and keep the Jaguars scoreless for that quarter. Kicker Rob Bironas made a field goal from 27 yards out. Later, Cortland Finnegan returned a loose ball 92 yards for a touchdown. Later, Chris Hope intercepted the ball and returned it 61 yards for another touchdown. At the end of the third quarter, the Titans were up by 14 points.

In the fourth quarter, WR Matt Jones caught a 3-yard pass from Jaguars quarterback David Garrard. The final score was 24–17, Titans. With the win, the Titans improved to 7–7.

=== Week 16: at Buffalo Bills ===
	1	2	3	4	Total
Titans	7	13	0	10	30
Bills	10	9	10	0	29

at Ralph Wilson Stadium, Buffalo, New York

The Titans (7–7) faced the Buffalo Bills (7–7) at Ralph Wilson Stadium on December 24, 2006. The Titans won 30–29 to improve to 8–7 and stay alive in the playoff chase, although their chances of making the tournament were slim. It was the first time the Titans had been above .500 in December since 2003 and assured that 2006 was not a losing season.

=== Week 17: vs. New England Patriots ===
	1	2	3	4	Total
Patriots	9	10	7	14	40
Titans	3	7	13	0	23

at LP Field, Nashville, Tennessee |Weather=62 °F or 16.7 °C (Light Rain)

Needing one more win to get into the playoffs, the Titans (8–7) wrapped up the regular season at home against the New England Patriots. In the first quarter, Tennessee scored first with kicker Rob Bironas getting a 25-yard field goal. The Patriots responded when kicker Stephen Gostkowski hit a 28-yard field goal, and then took the lead after RB Corey Dillon scored a 21-yard TD run, though the subsequent extra point attempt failed. New England continued their scoring with Gostkowski's 26-yard field goal and another touchdown from Dillon to go up 19–3. The Titans managed to score before halftime as CB Pacman Jones returned a punt 81 yards for a touchdown. In the third quarter, Tennessee inched closer on Bironas' 27-yard field goal. However, the Patriots extended their lead as QB Tom Brady completed a 62-yard touchdown pass to WR Reche Caldwell. The Titans responded with another 27-yard field goal from Bironas, followed by rookie QB Vince Young running 28 yards for a touchdown to bring the Titans to within three points. However, in the fourth quarter, New England essentially put the game away on RB Laurence Maroney’s one-yard TD run, followed by backup QB Vinny Testaverde completing a 6-yard TD pass to WR Troy Brown, making the final margin 40–23 in the Patriots' favor. With the loss, Tennessee ended their six-game winning streak, finished the season at 8–8, and was eliminated from the playoff race.
