= 2006 New York Giants season =

NFL team season

- General manager: Ernie Accorsi
- Head coach: Tom Coughlin
- Offensive coordinator: John Hufnagel
- Defensive coordinator: Tim Lewis
- Home stadium: Giants Stadium

Results
- Record: 8–8
- Division place: 3rd NFC East
- Playoffs: Lost Wild Card Playoffs (at Eagles) 20–23
- Pro Bowlers: 3: RB Tiki Barber; TE Jeremy Shockey; MLB Antonio Pierce

Uniform
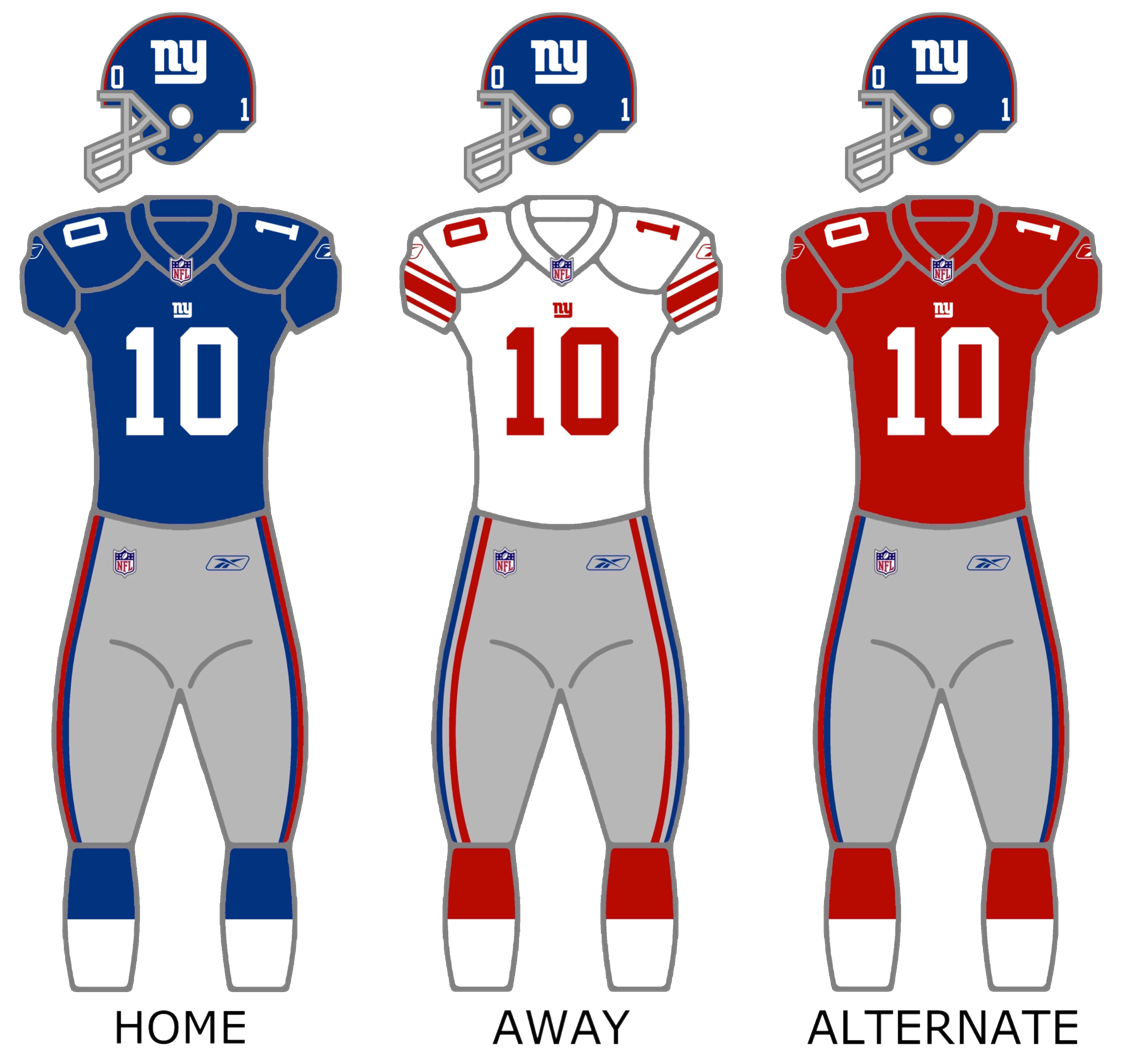

The 2006 New York Giants season was the franchise's 82nd season in the National Football League (NFL) and their third under head coach Tom Coughlin.

The season began with the team trying to improve on their 11–5 record from 2005, which saw them win the NFC East. They did not win the NFC East or improve on that record, falling to 8–8 on the season after starting 6–2. However, Coughlin became the first Giants head coach since Bill Parcells in 1989 and 1990 to lead the team to consecutive playoff berths as the team qualified as one of two NFC wild card teams. This was Tiki Barber's final season in the NFL.

== Offseason ==
In the 2006 off-season, the Giants acquired 3 time Pro Bowl linebacker LaVar Arrington as a free agent. Arrington previously played for the Redskins for six seasons. The Giants also acquired cornerback Sam Madison as a free agent. Madison played nine seasons with the Dolphins and went to the Pro Bowl four straight times from 1999 to 2002. Other notable free agent signings for the Giants included free safety Will Demps from the Ravens, cornerback R. W. McQuarters from the Lions, and linebacker Brandon Short from the Panthers.

In the 2006 NFL draft, the Giants used their first pick (acquired from the Pittsburgh Steelers) on Boston College DE Mathias Kiwanuka. They then used their next pick (acquired from the Baltimore Ravens) on University of Miami(FL) WR Sinorice Moss. The rest of their picks included Georgia Tech LB Gerris Wilkinson, Northwestern University DT Barry Cofield, East Carolina OT Guy Whimper, Alabama Safety Charlie Peprah, and Maryland CB Gerrick McPhearson.

The Giants posted a 4–0 record in the preseason, their first undefeated preseason since 1990, the same season they won Super Bowl XXV.

=== Draft Class ===
Round	Selection	Player	Position	College
1	32	Mathias Kiwanuka	Defensive end	Boston College
2	44	Sinorice Moss	Wide receiver	Miami (FL)
3	96	Gerris Wilkinson	Inside Linebacker	Georgia Tech
4	124	Barry Cofield	Defensive tackle	Northwestern
4	129	Guy Whimper	Offensive tackle	East Carolina
5	158	Charlie Peprah	Safety	Alabama
7	232	Gerrick McPhearson	Cornerback	Maryland

== Results ==
The Giants opened the season with a 6–2 record, but went 2–6 in the final half, barely making the playoffs. Inconsistent play by the whole team hurt the organization all season long and fans and sports analysts became irate with coach Tom Coughlin, calling for his firing. The team won five consecutive games following a 1–2 start to gain a two-game advantage in the NFC Eastern Division, but key injuries to the offense and defense took their toll. Tiki Barber had created controversy in the middle of the season by announcing his retirement to start a career in the media, which apparently was a distraction for many Giants players. The most embarrassing loss was a 24–21 defeat by Tennessee, in which the team surrendered a 21-point fourth quarter advantage, and which could have been averted had Mathias Kiwanuka finished tackling Titans QB Vince Young rather than letting him go and run for a first down. Following a season ending win at Washington, the Giants claimed a wild card berth in the NFC playoffs, but were eliminated in the first round by Philadelphia on a last second field goal.

Barber led the Giants with 1,662 yards and over 2,000 yards from scrimmage again, Eli Manning threw for 3,244 yards and 24 touchdowns, and Jeremy Shockey led the team in receptions. Defensively the team struggled all season long with pass defense (28th in the league).

== Roster ==
2006 New York Giants roster
Quarterbacks (QB): 8 Tim Hasselbeck; 12 Jared Lorenzen; 10 Eli Manning; Running backs (RB): 21 Tiki Barber; 24 Robert Douglas; 20 Jim Finn FB; 27 Brandon Jacobs; 30 James Sims; Wide receivers (WR): 17 Plaxico Burress; 84 Tim Carter; 15 Michael Jennings; 83 Sinorice Moss KR; 85 David Tyree; 19 Darius Watts; Tight ends (TE): 48 Darcy Johnson; 82 Visanthe Shiancoe; 80 Jeremy Shockey	Offensive linemen (OL): 66 David Diehl G; 73 Steve Edwards G/T; 67 Kareem McKenzie T; 60 Shaun O'Hara C; 65 Grey Ruegamer G/T; 69 Rich Seubert C/G; 76 Chris Snee G; 79 Guy Whimper G/T; 70 Bob Whitfield T; Defensive linemen (DL): 62 Titus Adams DT; 95 Adrian Awasom DE; 96 Barry Cofield DT; 94 William Joseph DE/DT; 97 Mathias Kiwanuka DE; 98 Fred Robbins DT; 75 Jonas Seawright DT; 72 Osi Umenyiora DE	Linebackers (LB): 57 Chase Blackburn MLB; 51 Carlos Emmons OLB; 58 Antonio Pierce MLB; 53 Reggie Torbor OLB; 54 Brandon Short OLB; 48 Tyson Smith OLB; 59 Gerris Wilkinson OLB; Defensive backs (DB): 33 Jason Bell CB/SS; 37 James Butler SS; 47 Will Demps FS; 35 Kevin Dockery CB; 25 R. W. McQuarters CB; 22 Sam Madison CB; 41 Frank Walker CB; 23 Corey Webster CB; 28 Gibril Wilson SS; Special teams (ST): 18 Jeff Feagles P; 2 Jay Feely K; 90 Ryan Kuehl LS	Practice squad: 36 R. J. Cobbs CB; 71 Jon Dunn T; 63 Todd Londot C; 93 Patrick Massey DE; 38 Gerrick McPhearson CB (IR); 89 Anthony Mix WR; 45 Jason Randall TE; 74 Matt Tarullo G; Reserve: 55 LaVar Arrington LB (IR); -- Ryan Grant RB (NF-Inj.); 61 Lewis Kelly G/T (IR); -- Matt Lentz G (IR); 29 Chad Morton RB/RS (IR); 77 Luke Petitgout T (IR); 92 Michael Strahan DE (IR); 81 Amani Toomer WR (IR); 91 Justin Tuck DE (IR); -- E. J. Underwood CB (IR); 34 Derrick Ward RB/KR (IR); Rookies in italics 53 active, 12 reserve, 7 practice squad

== Staff ==
2006 New York Giants staff
Front office: President/CEO – John Mara; Chairman/executive vice president – Steve Tisch; Senior vice president/general manager – Ernie Accorsi; Vice president of player evaluation – Chris Mara; Assistant general manager – Kevin Abrams; Director of player personnel – Jerry Reese; Director of pro personnel – David Gettleman; Assistant director of pro personnel – Ken Sternfeld; Director of college scouting – Marc Ross; Head coaches: Head coach – Tom Coughlin; Offensive coaches: Offensive coordinator – John Hufnagel; Quarterbacks – Kevin Gilbride; Running backs – Jerald Ingram; Wide receivers – Mike Sullivan; Tight ends – Mike Pope; Offensive line – Pat Flaherty; Assistant offensive line – Dave DeGuglielmo; Offensive quality control – John DeFilippo	Defensive coaches: Defensive coordinator – Tim Lewis; Defensive line – Mike Waufle; Linebackers- Bill Sheridan; Defensive backs – Peter Giunta; Secondary/safeties – David Merritt; Defensive quality control – Andre Curtis; Special team coaches: Special teams coordinator – Mike Sweatman; Assistant special teams – Tom Quinn; Strength and conditioning: Strength and conditioning – Jerry Palmieri; Assistant strength and conditioning – Andy Barnettl

== Preseason ==
Week	Date	Opponent	Result	Record	Venue
1	August 11	at Baltimore Ravens	W 17–16	1–0	M&T Bank Stadium
2	August 17	Kansas City Chiefs	W 17–0	2–0	Giants Stadium
3	August 25	at New York Jets	W 13–7	3–0	Giants Stadium
4	August 31	New England Patriots	W 31–23	4–0	Giants Stadium

== Regular season ==
Week	Date	Opponent	Result	Record	Venue	Recap
1	September 10	Indianapolis Colts	L 21–26	0–1	Giants Stadium	Recap
2	September 17	at Philadelphia Eagles	W 30–24 (OT)	1–1	Lincoln Financial Field	Recap
3	September 24	at Seattle Seahawks	L 30–42	1–2	Qwest Field	Recap
4	Bye					
5	October 8	Washington Redskins	W 19–3	2–2	Giants Stadium	Recap
6	October 15	at Atlanta Falcons	W 27–14	3–2	Georgia Dome	Recap
7	October 23	at Dallas Cowboys	W 36–22	4–2	Texas Stadium	Recap
8	October 29	Tampa Bay Buccaneers	W 17–3	5–2	Giants Stadium	Recap
9	November 5	Houston Texans	W 14–10	6–2	Giants Stadium	Recap
10	November 12	Chicago Bears	L 20–38	6–3	Giants Stadium	Recap
11	November 20	at Jacksonville Jaguars	L 10–26	6–4	Alltel Stadium	Recap
12	November 26	at Tennessee Titans	L 21–24	6–5	LP Field	Recap
13	December 3	Dallas Cowboys	L 20–23	6–6	Giants Stadium	Recap
14	December 10	at Carolina Panthers	W 27–13	7–6	Bank of America Stadium	Recap
15	December 17	Philadelphia Eagles	L 22–36	7–7	Giants Stadium	Recap
16	December 24	New Orleans Saints	L 7–30	7–8	Giants Stadium	Recap
17	December 30	at Washington Redskins	W 34–28	8–8	FedExField	Recap

== Standings ==
NFC East
	W	L	T	PCT	DIV	CONF	PF	PA	STK
^{(3)} Philadelphia Eagles	10	6	0	.625	5–1	9–3	398	328	W5
^{(5)} Dallas Cowboys	9	7	0	.563	2–4	6–6	425	350	L2
^{(6)} New York Giants	8	8	0	.500	4–2	7–5	355	362	W1
Washington Redskins	5	11	0	.313	1–5	3–9	307	376	L2

== Regular season ==
=== Week 1: vs. Indianapolis Colts ===
Quarter	1	2	3	4	Total
Colts	3	13	0	10	26
Giants	0	7	7	7	21

at Giants Stadium East Rutherford New Jersey

- Game time: 8:15 pm EDT
- Game weather: 71 °F or 21.7 °C, Cloudy
- Game attendance: 78,622
- Referee: Walt Anderson
- TV announcers (NBC): Al Michaels and John Madden

The Giants opened the regular season against the Indianapolis Colts on Sunday night, September 10. In a highly anticipated matchup that was nicknamed "Manning Bowl I", quarterback Eli Manning had to lead his Giants against his older brother, quarterback Peyton Manning, and the Colts. The Giants fell behind early as Peyton led the Colts on a 17-play, 58-yard drive that ate up 8:53, ending with kicker Adam Vinatieri hitting a 26-yard field goal. In the second quarter, the Colts built their lead with a 32-yard Vinatieri field goal, and after Jay Feely missed a 40-yard field goal wide left for the Giants, Peyton Manning found tight end Dallas Clark on a 2-yard touchdown pass. Down 13–0, and starting at their own 14-yard line with 2:18 to play in the half, the Giants' offense woke up, with Eli completing a 34-yard touchdown pass to wide receiver Plaxico Burress with 40 seconds to play in the half. But that was a little too much time left on the clock: The Colts ended the first half with Vinatieri kicking a 48-yard field goal.

On the opening drive of the second half, the Giants continued their momentum from the first half, as Eli completed a 15-yard touchdown pass to tight end Jeremy Shockey, completing an 11-play, 69-yard drive that ate up 7:50. After the teams traded punts, Peyton Manning was intercepted by R. W. McQuarters, but Eli Manning fumbled, and the ball was recovered by Robert Mathis. On the ensuing drive, running back Dominic Rhodes scored from 1 yard out to open up a 23–14 lead with 13:21 to play. Undaunted, the Giants responded with a 1-yard touchdown run of their own from running back Brandon Jacobs. The Giants forced a punt on the next possession, but longtime Indianapolis punter Hunter Smith pinned the Giants at their own 7 with 4:58 to go. On that drive, Tim Carter was whistled for a questionable pass-interference call, negating a 19-yard reception for a first down. On the next play, Eli Manning was picked off by Nick Harper. Vinatieri kicked a 32-yard field goal with 1:16 to play to cap the scoring.

With the loss, the Giants started the season at 0–1.

=== Week 2: at Philadelphia Eagles ===
Quarter	1	2	3	4	OT	Total
Giants	7	0	0	17	6	30
Eagles	7	10	7	0	0	24

at Lincoln Financial Field

- Game time: 1:00 pm EDT
- Game weather: 79 °F or 26.1 °C, Sunny
- Game attendance: 69,241
- Referee: Bill Carollo
- TV announcers (Fox): Joe Buck and Troy Aikman

In a Week 2 road matchup that pitted the Giants against the Philadelphia Eagles (the former NFC East champs), this game turned out to be a close one. The Giants drew first blood when Eli Manning threw a 37-yard touchdown pass to wide receiver Amani Toomer. The Eagles tied the game up when running back Brian Westbrook ran 12 yards for a touchdown. This was followed by a 20-yard touchdown pass to Donte' Stallworth and a 37-yard field goal by kicker David Akers, and the Giants trailed 17–7 at halftime. The Eagles' offense continued to pound the Giants as quarterback Donovan McNabb threw a 23-yard touchdown pass to wide receiver Reggie Brown to open up a 24–7 lead with 10:55 to play in the third quarter.

However, the momentum suddenly turned in the Giants' favor in the fourth quarter. It started with Manning completing a 23-yard pass to wide receiver Plaxico Burress, who fumbled the ball after being hit by Brian Dawkins; fortunately, wide receiver Tim Carter recovered the ball in the Eagles' end zone for a touchdown. The teams traded possessions, with Manning being intercepted by Jeremiah Trotter, and then the Giants' defense made a huge stop when they stopped Correll Buckhalter on a 4th-and-1 from the New York 38-yard line with 8:49 to play. Gibril Wilson made the stop there, and after the Giants punted, Wilson came up big again, forcing a fumble from Westbrook that was snatched up by Will Demps.

Manning then completed a 22-yard touchdown pass to Toomer with 3:33 to play, cutting the deficit to 24–21. After the Giants forced the Eagles to punt two minutes later, the Giants got the ball back at their own 20-yard line with 58 seconds left in regulation. With 15 seconds to play and the Giants on the Philadelphia 40-yard line, Manning completed a pass to Jeremy Shockey, who was run out of bounds at the Eagles' 32 for an eight-yard gain. However, after the play, Eagles lineman Trent Cole drew a personal foul for kneeing Giants tackle Kareem McKenzie in the groin, moving the ball to the Philadelphia 17. Jay Feely was sent in to tie the game, 24–24, with a 35-yard field goal. The Giants had completed an amazing comeback, scoring 17 points in under fourteen minutes to tie the game.

After the teams traded punts, the Giants took over at their own 15 with 9:55 to play in overtime. Manning completed a 13-play, 85-yard drive with a 31-yard strike to Burress with 3:18 to play, and the Giants had the miracle victory.

Manning completed 31 of 43 passes for 371 yards, three touchdowns and one interception. He completed 21 of his last 26 passes in the fourth quarter and in overtime, including all eight of his passes in overtime. Manning was selected the NFC Offensive Player of the Week for his outstanding performance against the Eagles.

With the win, the Giants improved to 1–1.

=== Week 3: at Seattle Seahawks ===
Quarter	1	2	3	4	Total
Giants	0	3	0	27	30
Seahawks	21	14	7	0	42

at Qwest Field

- Game time: 4:15 pm EDT/1:15 pm PDT
- Game weather: 65 °F or 18.3 °C, Sunny
- Game attendance: 68,161
- Referee: Mike Carey
- TV announcers (Fox): Joe Buck and Troy Aikman

In a rematch of a bitter 2005 loss for the Giants, when kicker Jay Feely missed three game-winning field goal attempts at the end of regulation and overtime in a 24–21 loss, the Seahawks made sure this game wasn't as close. After trading interceptions, with Corey Webster picking Matt Hasselbeck and Ken Hamlin intercepting Manning, the Seahawks jumped out to a 7–0 lead on a 2-yard touchdown run by Shaun Alexander. After forcing a punt, Hasselbeck tossed a 12-yard touchdown to Nate Burleson. Manning was intercepted again by Hamlin on the ensuing drive, leading to a 4-yard touchdown pass from Hasselbeck to Darrell Jackson, and in eleven minutes, Seattle had a 21–0 lead.

Manning had the ball on his own 43 with 10:43 left in the half when he threw his third pick of the game, this time to Michael Boulware. The Seahawks converted, going on a 12-play, 63-yard drive, capped off by a ten-yard touchdown pass from Hasselbeck to Will Heller. The game got worse for the Giants, as Plaxico Burress fumbled following a reception, with Leroy Hill recovering for Seattle. Hasselbeck then threw his fourth touchdown pass of the first half, this one going 21 yards to Bobby Engram. The Giants finally got on the board with a 46-yard field goal by Jay Feely as time expired.

Seattle pushed the lead to 42–3 in the third quarter with a 17-play, 70-yard drive that ate up 9:58, capped by a 12-yard touchdown pass from Hasselbeck to Jackson. The Giants' offense, dormant all game, finally sprang to life in the fourth quarter. Manning found Amani Toomer on a 13-yard touchdown strike. After Fred Robbins intercepted Hasselbeck, Manning wasted no time finding Tim Carter on a 25-yard touchdown pass. When R. W. McQuarters intercepted Hasselbeck for a 27-yard touchdown return, the once-enormous Seattle lead was suddenly cut to 42–24, with 9:30 to play. The Giants inched closer after forcing a punt, and Manning found David Tyree on a 9-yard touchdown pass, cutting the lead down to 42–30. The two-point conversion failed, however, and Seattle recovered the ensuing onside kick with less than three minutes remaining, effectively ending the game.

With the loss, the Giants fell to 1–2.

=== Week 5: vs. Washington Redskins ===
Quarter	1	2	3	4	Total
Redskins	3	0	0	0	3
Giants	0	9	7	3	19

at Giants Stadium

- Game time: 1:00 pm EDT
- Game weather: 66 °F or 18.9 °C, Sunny
- Game attendance: 78,653
- Referee: Larry Nemmers
- TV announcers (Fox): Dick Stockton, Daryl Johnston, and Tony Siragusa

The Giants' defense was trashed by the media during Week 4, their bye week, as they had allowed a whopping 92 points in their first three games. After forcing a punt, the Giants drove to the Washington 29, but Jay Feely was wide left on a 47-yard attempt. Aided by a William Joseph roughing-the-passer penalty on a 3rd-and-11 pass that was incomplete, Mark Brunell drove the Redskins to the Giants' 21, where John Hall nailed a 39-yard field goal. Manning was unfazed, finding Amani Toomer on a 44-yard completion to move the ball to the Washington 10, and apparently finding him for a touchdown pass of 5 yards three plays later, but the score was nullified by a Jeremy Shockey pass-interference penalty. Feely knocked in a chip shot of 24 yards to tie the score, 3–3, early in the second quarter.

Manning again used the big play to help the Giants to their next score, finding Plaxico Burress on a 46-yard completion that gave the Giants the ball at the Redskins' 22. Soon after, Feely hit a 34-yard field goal to give the Giants their first lead since Week 2. After forcing a punt, Manning led the Giants on a 14-play, 84-yard drive, capped by a 32-yard field goal by Feely, his third of the quarter and half. The Giants' offense finally ground into gear on the first possession of the second half, going on a 15-play, 69-yard drive that ate up 8:05 of the clock, capped by a 2-yard touchdown toss from Manning to Burress. The Redskins could muster only one scoring opportunity the rest of the way (Hall missed a 42-yard field goal wide left the possession after Burress' touchdown), and Feely added a 40-yard field goal with 2:58 to play, capping the scoring.

With the win the Giants went 2–2

=== Week 6: at Atlanta Falcons ===
Quarter	1	2	3	4	Total
Giants	0	3	14	10	27
Falcons	0	7	7	0	14

at Georgia Dome

- Game time: 1:00 pm EDT
- Game weather: Dome
- Game attendance: 70,840
- Referee: Walt Coleman
- TV announcers (Fox): Kenny Albert and Daryl Johnston

The Giants and Falcons got off to a rough start, as each team turned the ball over twice in the first quarter. After Atlanta punted to start the game, Manning was intercepted by Demorrio Williams, but two minutes later, Michael Vick was intercepted by Sam Madison. After forcing a Giants punt, Vick fumbled, with Madison recovering. Manning threw another pick on the next drive, this time to DeAngelo Hall.

Looking to break the game open in the second half, the Falcons turned to Warrick Dunn, who busted through a huge hole en route to a 90-yard touchdown run, the longest in Atlanta history. The score put the Falcons up 14–3, but Big Blue took command after that. Seizing control, the Giants used the legs of Barber and some fine passing from Manning to get back into the game. An 84-yard drive was finished with a two-yard plunge by Brandon Jacobs. After an Atlanta three and out, the Giants again drove the length of the field, with Barber leading the charge. Eli Manning finished off the 91 yard scamper with a short play-action touchdown to tight end Jeremy Shockey.

The Giants utilized a heavy pass rush to force the Falcons to punt again and after a Jay Feely field goal from 39 yards, the offense put the game away. Manning hit Shockey on another touchdown late, finishing off the Falcons. For the day, Manning was 17 of 30 for 180 yards, two touchdowns and two interceptions. Barber rushed for 185 yards and Jacobs added 53. Shockey re-emerged in this game with six receptions, including the two touchdowns. Defensively, the Giants recorded seven sacks including two from Osi Umenyiora and linebacker Brandon Short. Cornerback Sam Madison who had a rough start to the season had the interception against Vick and recovered his fumble in the first quarter. The constant pressure and containment on Vick was the key to the Giants 27–14 victory.

- On a side note, the Giants and Falcons set an NFL record as the visitor won in the series for the 11th consecutive time.

=== Week 7: at Dallas Cowboys ===
Quarter	1	2	3	4	Total
Giants	9	3	14	10	36
Cowboys	0	7	0	15	22

at Texas Stadium

- Game time: 8:30 pm EDT
- Game weather: 63 °F or 17.2 °C, Clear
- Game attendance: 63,512
- Referee: Peter Morelli
- TV announcers (ESPN): Mike Tirico, Joe Theismann, and Tony Kornheiser

The Giants started off hot right away against the Cowboys on Monday Night Football. Eli Manning hit Plaxico Burress deep down the field for a touchdown and linebacker Lavar Arrington sacked quarterback Drew Bledsoe for a safety and a 9–0 lead. However, Arrington was lost for the season, tearing his Achilles tendon in the 2nd quarter. The Cowboys got back into the game on a one-yard run by Bledsoe, but gave the momentum back as cornerback Sam Madison made a big play, intercepting Bledsoe at the goalline late in the half, keeping the Giants ahead 12–7.

In the second half, Bill Parcells relieved Bledsoe with young backup Tony Romo. The Giants intercepted Romo right away as linebacker Antonio Pierce caught a deflected ball. The Giants cashed in as Manning hooked up with Jeremy Shockey for a short touchdown. Following a Brandon Jacobs touchdown run on 4th down, the Giants opened up a 26–7 lead. Although the Cowboys threatened, the defense preserved the victory as reserve cornerback Kevin Dockery intercepted Romo and ran 96 yards for the clinching score. The Giants also held Terrell Owens to under 100 yards receiving.

The Giants defense was the story however, notching six more sacks including two from Strahan, and one apiece from Arrington and Osi Umenyiora. On offense, Tiki Barber shined again, rushing for 114 yards, while Brandon Jacobs added 40 yards. Quarterback Eli Manning maintained his poise to overcome a shaky game to throw for 189 yards and two touchdowns. The win moves the Giants to 4–2 and one half a game ahead of the Philadelphia Eagles.

The game drew the biggest audience in the history of cable television with an average viewership of 16,028,000, besting the previous high-water mark set during a 1993 the North American Free Trade Agreement (NAFTA) debate between vice president Al Gore and presidential hopeful H. Ross Perot. Also notably, DE Michael Strahan managed to tie with the legendary LB Lawrence Taylor for the most official sacks in franchise history (132.5).

=== Week 8: vs. Tampa Bay Buccaneers ===
Quarter	1	2	3	4	Total
Buccaneers	0	3	0	0	3
Giants	7	7	0	3	17

at Giants Stadium

- Game time: 1:00 pm EST
- Game weather: 53 °F or 11.7 °C, Partly Cloudy
- Game attendance: 78,647
- Referee: Jeff Triplette
- TV announcers (FOX): Sam Rosen and Tim Ryan

The Giants and Bucs were confronted with winds greater than 40 mph at the Meadowlands, but the Giants' defense dominated early and often. The Giants were able to hold the Bucs to six three and outs in their first seven possessions. On offense, Eli Manning and Tiki Barber were effective if not spectacular. Near the end of the first quarter, the Giants started a 54-yard drive, culminating on a seven-yard touchdown pass from Manning to Plaxico Burress.

Midway through the second quarter, the defense struck again as Cadillac Williams fumbled a pitch and tackle Fred Robbins recovered for New York at the Bucs' 28. The Giants then used a deep pass to Burress and hard-nosed running to extend their lead to 14–0. The touchdown was scored on a one-yard plunge by Brandon Jacobs. Tampa Bay had chances to get back into the game over the next 20 minutes, but several dropped passes and questionable fourth down plays doomed them. Overall, rookie quarterback Bruce Gradkowski played well for Tampa Bay, but it wasn't enough. The Giants clinched the win late in the fourth quarter with some power running from Jacobs and Barber. Jay Feely added a 31-yard field goal to provide the final points in the 17–3 win.

Rookie defensive end Mathias Kiwanuka had his first ever sack and six tackles, middle linebacker Reggie Torbor added a sack, and Fred Robbins continued his fine season with the fumble recovery. On offense, Barber and Jacobs rushed for over 100 yards combined, Burress notched seven receptions, and Manning completed 16 of 31 passes for 154 yards and the touchdown to Burress. The key was his ability to avoid the mistakes in the blustery conditions.

Note: The two offensive touchdowns scored by the Giants in this game were the first two offensive touchdowns scored against the Bucs since Tiki and Ronde Barber met for the first time during the 1997 season.

=== Week 9: vs. Houston Texans ===
Quarter	1	2	3	4	Total
Texans	0	3	7	0	10
Giants	7	0	0	7	14

at Giants Stadium

- Game time: 1:00 pm EDT
- Game weather: 46 °F or 7.8 °C, Partly Cloudy
- Game attendance: 78,485
- Referee: Bill Vinovich
- TV announcers (CBS): Kevin Harlan and Rich Gannon

The New York Giants defeated the Houston Texans 14–10 at Giants Stadium, despite a lackluster performance on both sides of the ball. The Giants got a break early as Texans place-kicker Kris Brown missed a 42-yard field goal. The Giants responded with a methodical 68-yard drive. RB Tiki Barber scored his first touchdown of the season on a 16-yard scamper. He finished the game with 115 rushing yards and 155 total yards from scrimmage.

Houston fought back in the second quarter with a long drive culminating in a Brown field goal. The Giants put together an excellent drive at the end of the first half, but a holding penalty and two sacks forced them to punt. In the third quarter, Houston continued its fine play, putting together an 18-play scoring drive finished by a David Carr quarterback draw. Carr was outstanding on the day completing 21 of 30 passes for 176 yards. He was not pressured all day, due to injuries to Osi Umenyiora, Justin Tuck, and Michael Strahan (the star defensive ends).

Trailing 10–7 in the fourth, the Giants offense finally came alive as QB Eli Manning led an outstanding 66-yard scoring drive utilizing the two-minute offense. Tight end Jeremy Shockey finished the drive on a three-yard play-action toss from Manning putting New York ahead 14–10. The defense preserved the lead by forcing a Houston fumble late in the game. The running game then gained two first downs and WR Amani Toomer caught an Eli Manning third down pass to end the game.

Jeremy Shockey led the Giants with eight receptions for 66 yards and Manning threw for 179 yards and one touchdown, along with an interception (at the end of the first half). Mathias Kiwanuka had the only sack of the day for New York.

=== Week 10: vs. Chicago Bears ===
Quarter	1	2	3	4	Total
Bears	3	7	14	14	38
Giants	7	6	7	0	20

at Giants Stadium

- Game time: 8:15 pm EST
- Game weather: 48 °F or 8.9 °C, Intermittent Rain
- Game attendance: 78,641
- Referee: Ed Hochuli
- TV announcers (NBC): Al Michaels and John Madden

The Chicago Bears met the Giants in a highly anticipated showdown of NFC powerhouses. Since both teams were leading their respective divisions at the time, NBC took advantage of the NFL's new flexible scheduling policy and made this matchup the first to ever be moved to primetime from Sunday afternoon.

The Giants got off to a good start when Bears quarterback Rex Grossman was intercepted by Mathias Kiwanuka, returning the ball to the Chicago one-yard line. Running back Brandon Jacobs plowed in for a 7–0 lead. After forcing two Chicago turnovers, kicker Jay Feely atoned for an early miss (33 yards) with two long field goals giving New York a 13–3 lead late in the first half.

The Bears responded making the first of several game-turning plays. On third and 22, with the Giants likely to get another possession before half's end, running back Thomas Jones ran practically untouched for a first down. A few plays later, Grossman hit Mark Bradley on a 29-yard strike putting the Bears within three. At the start of the second half, the Bears used excellent field position and soft coverage to make big plays, getting inside the Giants 10-yard line. Grossman hit a strike to Muhsin Muhammad for a 17–13 lead. Following a forced fumble, the Bears broke the game open on a Grossman two-yard pass to tight end Desmond Clark.

The Giants did not fold; running back Tiki Barber (19 carries, 141 yards) broke a 46-yard run to put the Giants inside the Chicago 10. Jacobs capped off the drive with his second touchdown run, getting New York within four. After a Bears punt, kick return star Devin Hester broke the Giants' backs. Facing a long 51-yard field goal into swirling winds, Jay Feely's kick fell well short and into Hester's hands in the end zone. Seeing the Giants' players not paying attention, Hester scampered up the sideline with the ball for a 108-yard touchdown return to put their lead back to eleven and effectively put the game out of reach. A late touchdown run by Thomas Jones closed the scoring and gave the Bears a 38–20 victory.

For the Giants, Plaxico Burress and David Tyree finished with four catches, and Fred Robbins and R. W. McQuarters had sacks. Eli Manning in his worst performance of the season, threw for 121 yards and two interceptions in the defeat.

=== Week 11: at Jacksonville Jaguars ===
Quarter	1	2	3	4	Total
Giants	3	0	7	0	10
Jaguars	3	7	6	10	26

at Alltel Stadium, Jacksonville, Florida

- Game time: 8:30 pm EST
- Game weather: 45 °F or 7.2 °C, Cloudy
- Game attendance: 67,164
- Referee: Ron Winter
- TV announcers (ESPN/WWOR): Mike Tirico, Joe Theismann, and Tony Kornheiser

Former head coach Tom Coughlin returned to Alltel Stadium on Monday night to play against the Jaguars, the team that he led to two conference title games in his tenure there, but it did not go well as the Giants laid an egg, losing 26–10. After Jacksonville muffed a handoff and punted, the Giants had the ball at the Jacksonville 30 but could only muster a field goal. Jacksonville answered with a Josh Scobie field goal near the quarter's end.

The Jaguars then moved ahead for good with a 10-play, 57-yard drive capped off by a Fred Taylor touchdown run. Taylor however fumbled at the Giants goalline near the half's end and the score remained 10–3. Meanwhile, the Giants offense was held to two first downs in the first half and could not generate any threats. Utilizing a short field in the second half, the Jaguars went ahead 13–3 on a Scobie field goal. After a forced fumble was overturned by a penalty, Eli Manning and the Giants finally awakened, going 70 yards in 11 plays culminating on a 24-yard catch and run by Plaxico Burress.

The Giants were in a great position to stop the Jaguars but David Garrard spun out of a sure sack and rushed for a first down, leading to another Scobie field goal. On their next possession, the Giants defense got burned again, as wideout Matt Jones caught a pass from Garrard on third and long for 49 yards. Maurice Jones-Drew scored from three yards out and the Giants were done.

Garrard was outstanding on the day completing 19 of 32 passes for over 240 yards and the Jaguars rushed for better than 150 yards. For the Giants, Jeremy Shockey led the team with seven catches and Tiki Barber was held to only 20 yards rushing in the defeat. New York's second straight defeat moves them into a first place tie in the tough NFC East with the resurgent Dallas Cowboys and their quarterback Tony Romo. The loss was the Giants' second consecutive.

=== Week 12: at Tennessee Titans ===
Quarter	1	2	3	4	Total
Giants	7	14	0	0	21
Titans	0	0	0	24	24

at LP Field, Nashville, Tennessee

- Game time: 4:15 pm EST
- Game weather: 69 °F or 20.6 °C, Sunny
- Game attendance: 69,143
- Referee: Larry Nemmers
- TV announcers (Fox): Kenny Albert and Brian Baldinger

What started as a dominating performance ended with one of the most monumental collapses in franchise history as the Giants lost to the Tennessee Titans 24–21 after leading 21–0 with nine minutes remaining. After stopping the Titans early in the first quarter, the Giants drove 52 yards in nine plays, mixing up the run and pass. The drive culminated in a three-yard touchdown from Eli Manning to Plaxico Burress. After a second Titans fumble, the Giants extended the margin with a 10-yard touchdown run by Brandon Jacobs. The Giants opened up a 21-point lead when Jacobs scored again on a short run, late in the first half.

The Giants continued to lead 21–0 until midway through the fourth quarter. With the running game and short passing game moving the ball well, the Giants made the first of several mistakes. Manning threw long to Burress and was intercepted. After Vince Young was stopped on fourth down, the Giants committed a personal foul that kept the drive alive. Young then threw a score to Bo Scaife bringing the Titans within 14. After a Giants punt and big punt return from Adam "Pacman" Jones, Young struck again, this time on a one-yard bootleg. New York was forced to punt again. After the defense held on the first three plays, Young got away on a fluke after Giants' pass rusher Mathias Kiwanuka, thinking the play was dead, unbelievably let go of Vince Young on a sack-to-be, leading to a first down. Six plays later, the Titans were back in the end zone when Brandon Jones caught a Young pass to tie the game with less than a minute remaining.

Although the game appeared to be headed to overtime, Manning attempted to lead a furious drive into field goal range. Instead, he threw an ill-advised sideline pass, which was intercepted at the 50-yard line. Two passes from Young was enough to set up a 49-yard field goal, which kicker Rob Bironas connected on as time expired, giving the Titans the improbable victory. Manning finished 18 for 28 for 143 yards, a touchdown and two interceptions. Tiki Barber had 85 yards rushing and Jeremy Shockey had five catches in the devastating defeat.

=== Week 13: vs. Dallas Cowboys ===
Quarter	1	2	3	4	Total
Cowboys	7	3	3	10	23
Giants	7	0	3	10	20

at Giants Stadium

- Game time: 4:15 pm EDT
- Game weather: 45 °F or 7.2 °C, Clear
- Game attendance: 78,666
- Referee: Walt Coleman
- TV announcers (Fox): Joe Buck and Troy Aikman

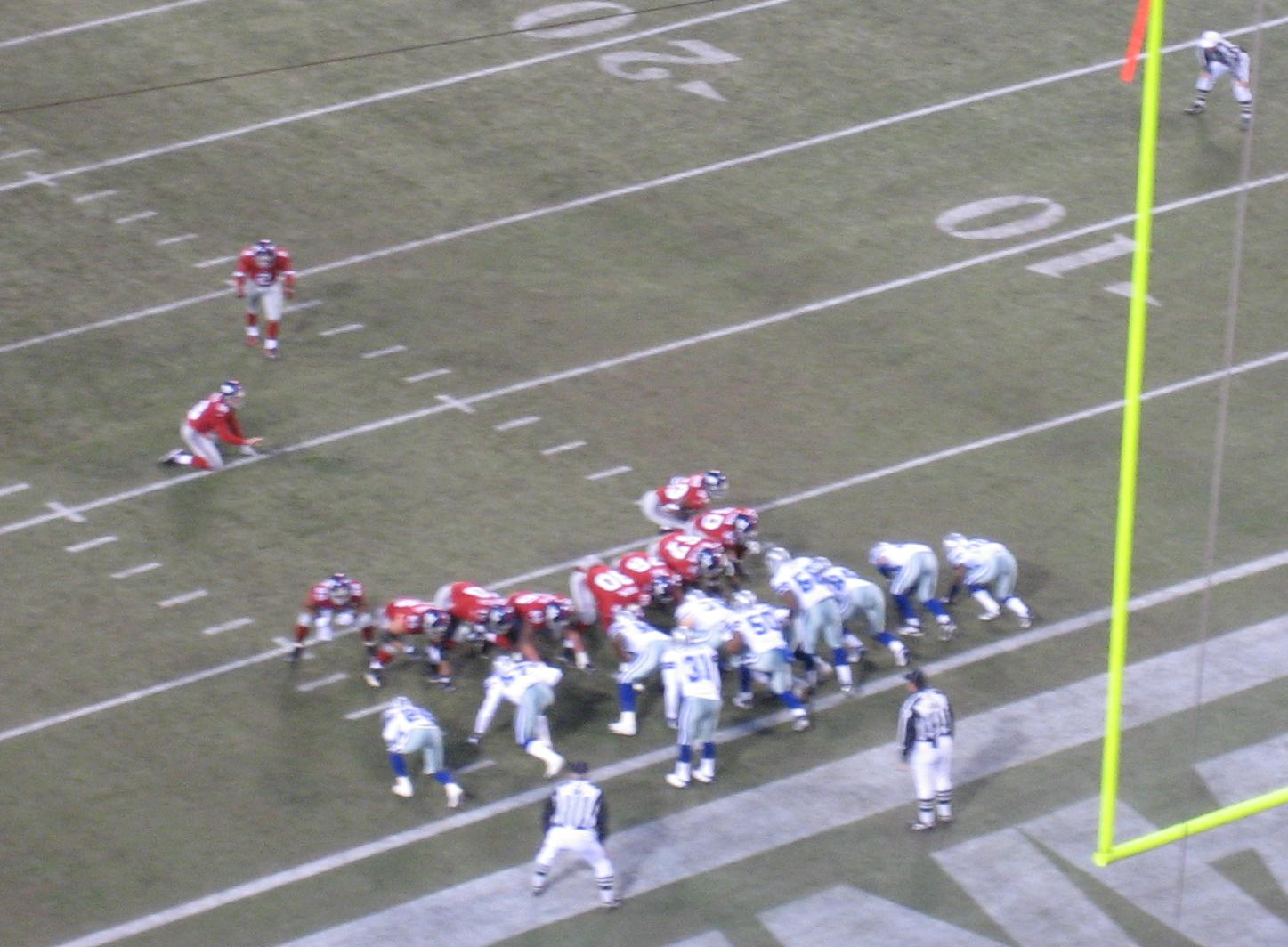
The Giants attempt an extra point in their week 13 matchup with the Dallas Cowboys.

The Giants have been victims of their own self-inflicted wounds during the past three games and today's game against the Cowboys yielded no exception as the Giants made mistakes, leading to their defeat. Tony Romo threw to tight end Jason Witten for a big play with only about 50 seconds remaining. Newly acquired kicker Martin Gramatica then hit a 46-yard field goal to give Dallas a 23–20 win and a two-game lead in the NFC Eastern Division. It was a hard-fought game from start to finish, but several mistakes by the Giants, including four personal foul penalties, a fumble after an interception, terrible play calling in the redzone and questionable timeout with 1:43 remaining, cost the team dearly.

The Giants began well with Eli Manning playing one of his best games in weeks. The Giants traveled 66 yards in 10 plays. Using a combination of good running and pass mixture, Eli Manning hit an open Jeremy Shockey for a 17-yard touchdown. Romo then threw his first of two interceptions, to defensive end Mathias Kiwanuka, who fumbled the ball as he ran, leading to a Dallas recovery. Three plays later, Dallas was in the endzone as Marion Barber scored. Late in the first half with the Giants moving, New York made another critical mistake. With fourth and inches at the Dallas 21, the Giants called a long handoff that was stuffed. Dallas then went ahead with a field goal for a 10–7 halftime lead.

New York had several opportunities to put the Cowboys on the ropes in the second half, but poor play-calling following long drives hurt them. After traveling to the Dallas five late in the period, a poor pass by Manning, a run for nothing, and another dangerous pass forced the Giants to tie the game with a field goal. After Dallas made a field goal to take a 13–10 lead, Manning again led the Giants downfield. This time, while inside the 10, running back Brandon Jacobs was unthinkably removed from the ball game despite his ability to pound the football. The Giants had to tie the game at 13.

With nine minutes left, Romo led the Cowboys to a 20–13 lead by converting on several crucial first downs on a 12-play, 66-yard drive. On one third down, safety Gibril Wilson nearly intercepted Romo. However, in a trend of mistakes, he did not make the play, and the pass was complete for a first down. Down by seven with minutes to play, Eli Manning led the Giants downfield using a no-huddle offense. Following a long screen pass to Tiki Barber, the Giants committed another mistake; they called a timeout to keep an additional 40 seconds on the clock. Manning capped off the 63 yard march with a seven-yard strike to Plaxico Burress to tie it at 20–20.

But the Giants had no answer on defense for Tony Romo's confidence or late game heroics. The bad timeout came back to haunt the Giants as Romo found Jason Witten open downfield and Gramatica kicked the game-winner. Manning was 24–36 for 270 yards and two touchdowns, and Tiki Barber rushed for 90 yards. Shockey led the Giants with six receptions. The differences in the game were once again the questionable playcalls and poor execution at crucial times in the game. Romo for the day was exceptional, finishing 20 of 34 for 257 passing yards, with two interceptions.

=== Week 14: at Carolina Panthers ===
Quarter	1	2	3	4	Total
Giants	3	14	10	0	27
Panthers	0	10	0	3	13

at Bank of America Stadium, Charlotte, North Carolina

- Game time: 1:00 pm EST
- Game weather: 47 °F or 8.3 °C, Sunny
- Game attendance: 73,702
- Referee: Terry McAulay
- TV announcers (Fox): Joe Buck and Troy Aikman

A 27–13 victory over the Carolina Panthers boosted New York to 7–6 and an inside track to an NFC Wildcard spot. In a refreshing change of pace, the Giants did not make any major mistakes and the defense forced three second half turnovers to hold off a potential Panther rally. With RB Tiki Barber running well early, the Giants jumped out to a 10–0 lead, courtesy of a Jay Feely 32-yard field goal and a 28-yard touchdown from QB Eli Manning to WR Plaxico Burress. The Giants surrendered the lead however as Panthers' backup quarterback Chris Weinke hit WR Drew Carter on a 36-yard strike and John Kasay kicked a field goal. Right before halftime, Manning and the Giants went to the two-minute drill, driving right down the field. The drive included an important third down completion from Manning to TE Jeremy Shockey. Shockey then caught a two-yard rollout from Manning for a 17–10 halftime lead.

The Giants took control in the third quarter as Weinke was intercepted for the first of three times, two by safety Gibril Wilson. Feely added his second field goal making it 20–10. After Wilson's second forced interception, the Giants extended the lead with some excellent running from Barber and RB Brandon Jacobs. A slip-screen to Barber from Manning, pushed the ball inside the five and Manning then hit WR David Tyree on a three-yard touchdown to put Big Blue up 17. Although Weinke threw for over 400 yards, the defense made the key plays in critical moments. Rookie DB Kevin Dockery recorded his second interception of the season late in the game. Tiki Barber rushed for 112 yards on 20 carries, Burress led the Giants with 77 yards receiving on four catches, and Manning despite a shaky start, finished 17 of 33 for 172 yards while throwing three touchdowns and no interceptions in the Giants win. The win also saw the potential emergence of rookie wide receiver Sinorice Moss who showed good speed on catching quick-outs from Manning. Moss had two receptions on the day. With the win, the G-Men also snapped their four-game losing skid.

Tiki Barber became the first Giant running back in franchise history to gain over 10,000 career rushing yards and also became the third player in NFL history to gain more than 10,000 rushing yards and 5,000 receiving yards in an NFL career, joining Marshall Faulk and Marcus Allen.

=== Week 15: vs. Philadelphia Eagles ===
Quarter	1	2	3	4	Total
Eagles	7	7	0	22	36
Giants	7	3	3	9	22

at Giants Stadium

- Game time: 4:15 pm EST
- Game weather: 56 °F or 13.3 °C, Cloudy
- Game attendance: 78,657
- Referee: Gerry Austin
- TV announcers (Fox): Joe Buck and Troy Aikman

The Giants hosted the Philadelphia Eagles in a match crucial to their playoff and divisional title hopes. The Giants started off well, stopping the Eagles quickly. Chad Morton then returned a punt to the Eagle 21 and Tiki Barber scored from 11 yards out giving New York an early lead. After Philadelphia converted a third and 11, quarterback Jeff Garcia drove his team the length of field and Correll Buckhalter tied the game. The Giants offense, although moving well, was hurt by several penalties and fumbles by Visanthe Shiancoe and Brandon Jacobs. The Eagles went ahead 14–7 with a one-yard run by Brian Westbrook on fourth down, and the Giants added a Jay Feely field goal to make it 14–10 at the recess.

The Giants had several opportunities to take command in the second half, but red zone difficulties, similar to those experienced against the Cowboys in week 13, hurt their chances. Eli Manning hit Plaxico Burress in stride for a big gain to get inside the 10, but were forced to settle for a field goal. After forcing a fumble on the ensuing Eagles possession, the Giants had the ball first and goal from the seven-yard line, but two runs and a pass yielded zero yards and Feely kicked another short field goal, putting the Giants ahead 16–14.

The Eagles came right back as Reno Mahe returned the ensuing kick 64 yards for Philadelphia. Westbrook then ran through a gaping hole 28 yards for a touchdown. The Eagles' next drive ended with an interception by Giants cornerback Will Demps. The Giants took advantage on a drive culminating with a Jacobs score from one yard out. After the score, the Giants went for the two-point conversion, but were denied on a draw play, leaving the score 22–21 with seven minutes remaining. Garcia responded swiftly by driving his squad 80 yards in eight plays; an 18-yard strike to Reggie Brown and a conversion put the Eagles up seven. Manning was then intercepted on the following drive for an insurance touchdown by Trent Cole, ostensibly putting the game away for Philadelphia.

For the game, the Eagles 31st-ranked rush defense held the Giants to 88 net running yards, Manning threw for 282 yards on 28 of 40 passing, Burress recorded 120 receiving yards and Jeremy Shockey had eight receptions for 70 yards. Carlos Emmons and Will Demps recorded the only sacks for the Giants. For Philadelphia, Jeff Garcia continued his surprising rebirth, completing 19 of 28 passes for 237 yards and one touchdown (along with one interception), and Brian Westbrook gained over 140 total yards while scoring a touchdown.

=== Week 16: vs. New Orleans Saints ===
Quarter	1	2	3	4	Total
Saints	3	10	7	10	30
Giants	7	0	0	0	7

at Giants Stadium

- Game time: 1:00 pm EST
- Game weather: 52 °F or 11.1 °C, Sunny
- Game attendance: 78,539
- Referee: Bill Carollo
- TV announcers (Fox): Dick Stockton and Troy Aikman

In Tiki Barber's final home game as a Giant, New York seemingly (but not officially) needed a victory to keep their playoff hopes alive. The game started well for the Giants with Eli Manning throwing a 55-yard touchdown to Plaxico Burress touchdown on the Giants' opening possession. After stopping the Saints, returner Chad Morton fumbled a punt, resulting in a Saints field goal. After a second field goal, the Saints marched downfield again, orchestrating an 18-play drive for a touchdown. Twice, the Saints converted on fourth down, including a two-yard touchdown from Drew Brees to Marques Colston for a 13–7 lead.

In the second half, the Saints took command of the game, as the Saints running game frustrated the Giants defense. Reggie Bush added a one-yard touchdown to put the Saints up 20–7. Deuce McAllister later scored a nine-yard touchdown and John Carney hit his third field goal to close out the scoring in a 30–7 loss for the Giants, their sixth in seven games. In his final home game, Barber was held to 71 rushing yards, the Giants dropped eight passes, and Manning missed on 16 of his final 19 pass attempts. Towards the end of the third quarter, a chant of "Fire Coughlin" rained down from the rafters of Giants Stadium from fans disgruntled with the Giants' play in the second half of the season. Amazingly, the Giants were still mathematically alive for the NFC's final wild card spot, tied with four other teams at 7–8.

=== Week 17: at Washington Redskins ===
Quarter	1	2	3	4	Total
Giants	3	17	7	7	34
Redskins	7	0	7	14	28

at FedExField, Landover, Maryland

- Game time: 8:00 pm EST
- Game weather: 48 °F or 8.9 °C, Clear
- Game attendance: 86,141
- Referee: Walt Anderson
- TV announcers (NFLN): Bryant Gumbel and Cris Collinsworth

Quarterback Coach Kevin Gilbride took over the play calling this week, and the Giants went back to what worked in 2005, the running game. Tiki Barber, in his final regular season game as a Giant, played the best game of his career, rushing for a franchise-record 234 yards on 23 carries, including three touchdowns to help spark New York to a 34–28 win over the Washington Redskins. At 8–8, the Giants, despite a 2–6 second half of the season, were able to qualify as a wild card team in the NFC playoffs.

The defense made the first big play of the game as Fred Robbins picked up a Ladell Betts fumble and ran 67 yards to the Redskins' 12. Jay Feely hit a short field goal for a 3–0 lead. After Washington took a 7–3 lead on a touchdown pass from Antwaan Randle El to Santana Moss, Barber took control. He ran straight through the Washington front four to score from 15 yards out for a 10–7, then added a 55-yard spectacular run for a 17–7 lead. Feely added another field goal for a 20–7 halftime lead.

The Giants defense set the tone for the third quarter as backup safety Jason Bell intercepted Jason Campbell. Eli Manning, despite a mediocre performance, tossed a perfect six-yard play action pass to wide receiver Tim Carter extending New York's lead to 20. However, the Giants defense, which has been susceptible to giving up leads this season allowed Washington to get back into the game. After Osi Umenyiora missed a sack on Campbell, the Redskins quarterback hit Betts on fourth down for a touchdown. After a Giants punt, T. J. Duckett closed the lead to six with a one-yard plunge.

Barber extended the lead by ripping off another big run, this time from 50 yards for a 34–21 lead. But the Redskins didn't go away. A lack of pass rush added to poor coverage in the secondary allowed the Redskins to move 68 yards in eight plays for another touchdown. At last, on fourth-and-10 late in the game, safety Gibril Wilson broke up a pass intended for Randle El, and the Giants ran out the clock. Barber's 234 rushing yards were the most ever by a Giant in a single game. For the season, he rushed for 1,662 yards. And Tiki Barber became the third active player in NFL history to have four 2,000 total yard seasons, joining Marshall Faulk and Dante Hall. Manning, despite throwing for only 101 yards, did not make any crucial mistakes and finished the season with 3,244 passing yards with 24 touchdowns. The big improvement however was in his completion percentage. For the year, he hit on 57.7% of his passes, a near five percent improvement from 2005.

Because the St. Louis Rams, the Carolina Panthers and the Houston Texans won their games the following day, the Giants clinched the strength of victory tiebreaker over the Green Bay Packers to clinch the final playoff spot in the NFC. The Giants became the eighth team in NFL history to make the playoffs with an 8–8 record.

== Playoffs ==
Playoff round	Date	Opponent (seed)	Result	Record	Venue	Recap
Wild Card	January 7, 2007	at Philadelphia Eagles (3)	L 20–23	0–1	Lincoln Financial Field	Recap

=== NFC Wild Card Round: at Philadelphia Eagles ===
Quarter	1	2	3	4	Total
Giants	7	3	0	10	20
Eagles	0	17	3	3	23

at Lincoln Financial Field

- Game time: 4:39 pm EST
- Game weather: 52 °F or 11.1 °C, Mostly Cloudy
- Game attendance: 69,094
- Referee: Pete Morelli
- TV announcers (Fox): Joe Buck, Troy Aikman, Pam Oliver, Chris Myers

The Giants were defeated on a last second, 38-yard field goal by the Philadelphia Eagles' David Akers in their first round playoff game to finish the 2006 season. The 23–20 defeat officially ended the Giants' season and Tiki Barber's career. Quarterback Eli Manning, despite an 0–2 postseason record was far better this time around as compared to last year's matchup versus the Carolina Panthers. He got off to a fast start against the Philadelphia Eagles today.

Taking the opening kickoff, Manning used some solid passes and Barber running to move right down the field. The 67-yard drive was culminated in a 17-yard strike from Manning to Plaxico Burress. However, after the opening drive, the offense missed several opportunities to break the game open in the first half as the defense stuffed the Eagles' attack, yielding good field position. Three separate times the Giants started at their own 47 or better, but could not get any more points. The Eagles finally got going in the second quarter as Giant killer Brian Westbrook ran 49 yards to tie the game at 7–7. Philadelphia extended their lead to 10–7 with a short Akers field goal after the defense tightened up at the goalline.

New York responded with an 11 play drive to get inside the Philadelphia 5-yard line, but in a recurring theme this season, the offense could not score a touchdown. Brandon Jacobs was taken out of the game and the move was questioned by analysts and fans alike. Jay Feely's field goal tied the game at 10–10, but the Eagles moved 80 yards in 10 plays to take a 17–10 halftime lead. Jeff Garcia who was held in check for most of the game, hit Donte' Stallworth on a 28-yard pass to score the touchdown.

The Eagles extended their lead to 20–10 with a 48-yard field goal in the third quarter before the Giants responded with a 65-yard drive to cut the lead to 20–13. However, the Giants after getting inside the 10 again, could not convert and Feely was summoned for the kick. The Giants' defense, tough all day stopped Philadelphia again and then Eli Manning led a tremendous 13 play, 80-yard drive to tie the game at 20–20. On the drive, the Giants converted three third downs, including a 3rd and 12 after the Giants had 1st and 30. Burress converted the final third down, then Manning hit him with a bullet for a touchdown to the tie the score. However, Westbrook's tough running and safe passes from Garcia got David Akers in position for the game winning kick as the clock ran out.

For the day, Manning completed 16 of 27 passes for 161 yards, 2 touchdowns and an interception. Barber in his final game rushed for 137 yards and Burress led the Giants with five receptions for 89 yards in the postseason defeat as the Giants finished their season with an overall record of 8–9.

== See also ==
- History of the New York Giants (1994-present)
- List of New York Giants seasons
