= Stephen Tulloch =

American football player (born 1985)

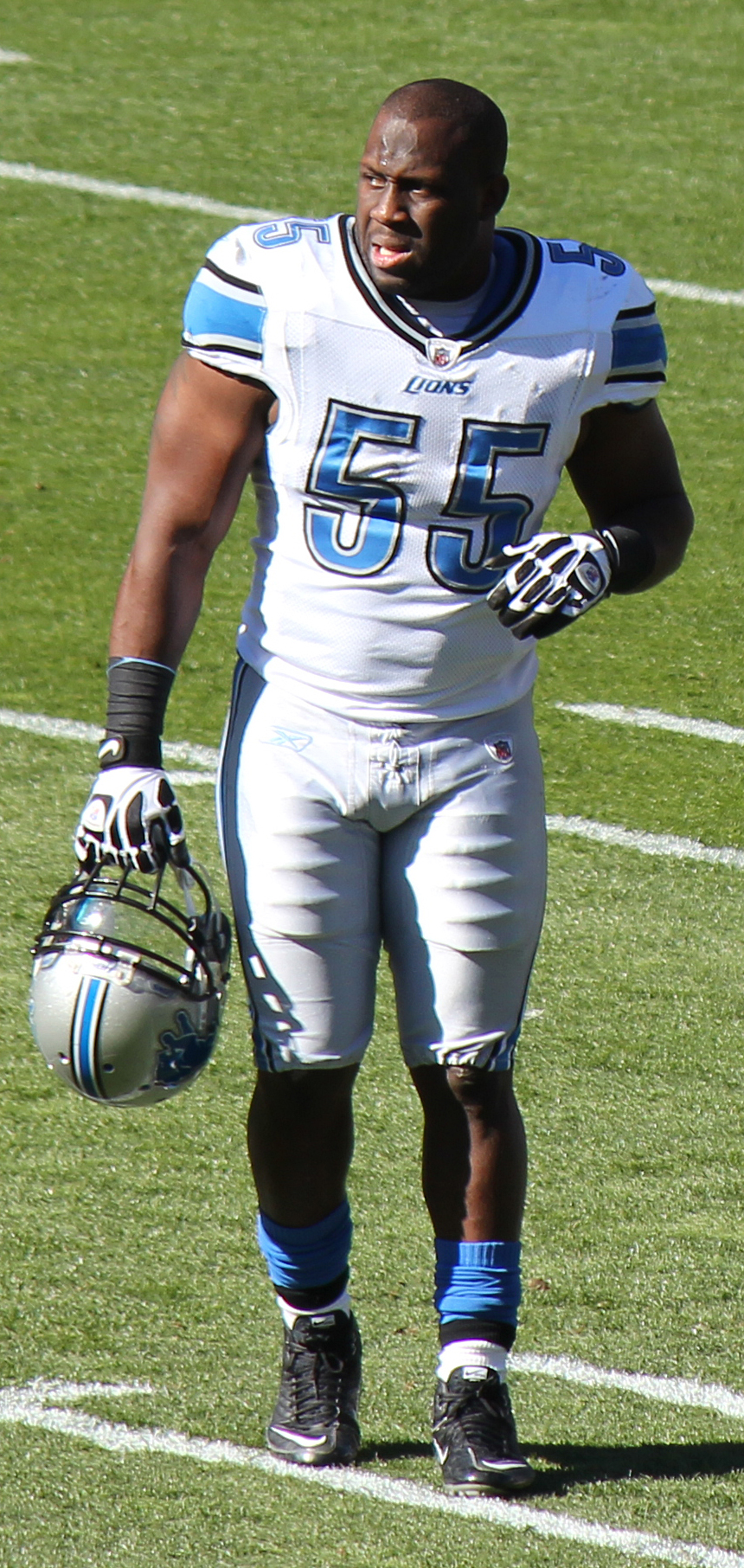
- Tulloch with the Detroit Lions in 2011

No. 55, 54, 50
- Position: Linebacker

Personal information
- Born: January 1, 1985 (age 41); Miami, Florida, U.S.
- Listed height: 5 ft 11 in (1.80 m)
- Listed weight: 245 lb (111 kg)

Career information
- High school: Miami Killian (Kendall, Florida)
- College: NC State (2003–2005)
- NFL draft: 2006: 4th round, 116th overall pick

Career history
- Tennessee Titans (2006–2010); Detroit Lions (2011–2015); Philadelphia Eagles (2016)

Awards and highlights
- First-team All-ACC (2005)

Career NFL statistics
- Total tackles: 959
- Sacks: 14.5
- Forced fumbles: 3
- Fumble recoveries: 12
- Interceptions: 5
- Defensive touchdowns: 1
- Stats at Pro Football Reference

Stephen Michael Tulloch (born January 1, 1985) is an American former professional football player who was a linebacker in the National Football League (NFL). He was selected by the Tennessee Titans in the fourth round of the 2006 NFL draft. He played college football for the NC State Wolfpack. He was also a member of the Detroit Lions and Philadelphia Eagles.

== College career ==
After graduating from Miami Killian High School, Tulloch played college football at North Carolina State and was the MVP of the Meineke Car Care Bowl in a 2005 victory over the University of South Florida. After his junior season, he announced that he would forgo his senior season and enter the 2006 NFL draft.

== Professional career ==
Pre-draft measurables
Height	Weight	Arm length	Hand span	40-yard dash	10-yard split	20-yard split	20-yard shuttle	Three-cone drill	Vertical jump	Broad jump	Bench press
5 ft 10 3/4 in (1.80 m)	241 lb (109 kg)	30 3/4 in (0.78 m)	9 1/2 in (0.24 m)	4.86 s	1.69 s	2.83 s	4.15 s	7.19 s	33.5 in (0.85 m)	9 ft 5 in (2.87 m)	27 reps
All values from NFL Combine

=== Tennessee Titans ===
The Tennessee Titans selected Tulloch in the fourth round (116th overall) of the 2006 NFL draft. He played for them from 2006 to 2010, recording 457 tackles, 4.5 sacks and two interceptions.

=== Detroit Lions ===
Tulloch signed with the Detroit Lions on July 31, 2011. During his first year with the Lions he started all 16 games, recording 111 tackles, three sacks and two interceptions. One of his sacks was against Tim Tebow where he celebrated the sack by tebowing. He re-signed to a five-year contract with the Lions on March 20, 2012. In 2012, Tulloch was named recipient of the Detroit Lions-Detroit Sports Broadcasters Association/Pro Football Writers Association's Media-Friendly "Good Guy Award" for his interactions with the media in Detroit. On September 21, 2014, Tulloch tore his ACL while celebrating a sack of Aaron Rodgers in the first quarter of the week 3 game against the Green Bay Packers. He was placed on season-ending injured reserve on September 22, 2014.

On July 5, 2016, Tulloch was released by the Lions.

=== Philadelphia Eagles ===
On August 21, 2016, Tulloch signed a one-year, $3 million contract with the Philadelphia Eagles, reuniting him with defensive coordinator Jim Schwartz, whom he played for in Tennessee, from 2006 to 2008, and Detroit, from 2011 to 2013.

On April 18, 2017, Tulloch announced his retirement from the NFL after 11 seasons. He has remained active in the Detroit community following his retirement, and attends Lions alumni events with his former team.

== NFL career statistics ==
Legend
**Bold**	Career high

=== Regular season ===
Year	Team	Games		Tackles					Interceptions					Fumbles			
Year	Team	GP	GS	Cmb	Solo	Ast	Sck	TFL	Int	Yds	TD	Lng	PD	FF	FR	Yds	TD
2006	TEN	**16**	3	54	32	22	0.5	5	1	0	0	0	3	0	1	0	0
2007	TEN	**16**	1	49	36	13	0.0	2	0	0	0	0	0	0	0	0	0
2008	TEN	**16**	12	83	63	20	1.0	4	0	0	0	0	2	0	2	**4**	0
2009	TEN	**16**	13	121	94	27	2.0	**9**	0	0	0	0	1	0	1	0	0
2010	TEN	**16**	**16**	**160**	**111**	**49**	1.0	6	1	**18**	0	**18**	**6**	0	1	0	0
2011	DET	**16**	**16**	111	84	27	3.0	8	**2**	9	0	9	5	**1**	**3**	**4**	**1**
2012	DET	**16**	**16**	112	74	38	0.5	6	0	0	0	0	**6**	**1**	2	0	0
2013	DET	**16**	**16**	135	93	42	**3.5**	7	1	0	0	0	3	0	0	0	0
2014	DET	3	3	20	15	5	2.0	4	0	0	0	0	0	0	0	0	0
2015	DET	**16**	**16**	107	74	33	1.0	**9**	0	0	0	0	1	**1**	2	0	0
2016	PHI	12	1	7	7	0	0.0	0	0	0	0	0	0	0	0	0	0
Career		159	113	959	683	276	14.5	60	5	27	0	18	27	3	12	8	1

=== Playoffs ===
Year	Team	Games		Tackles					Interceptions					Fumbles			
Year	Team	GP	GS	Cmb	Solo	Ast	Sck	TFL	Int	Yds	TD	Lng	PD	FF	FR	Yds	TD
2007	TEN	**1**	**1**	7	6	1	0.0	**2**	0	0	0	0	0	0	0	0	0
2008	TEN	**1**	**1**	3	0	3	0.0	0	0	0	0	0	0	0	0	0	0
2011	DET	**1**	**1**	**15**	**8**	**7**	0.0	1	0	0	0	0	**2**	**1**	0	0	0
Career		3	3	25	14	11	0.0	3	0	0	0	0	2	1	0	0	0
