= Mathias Kiwanuka =

American football player (born 1983)

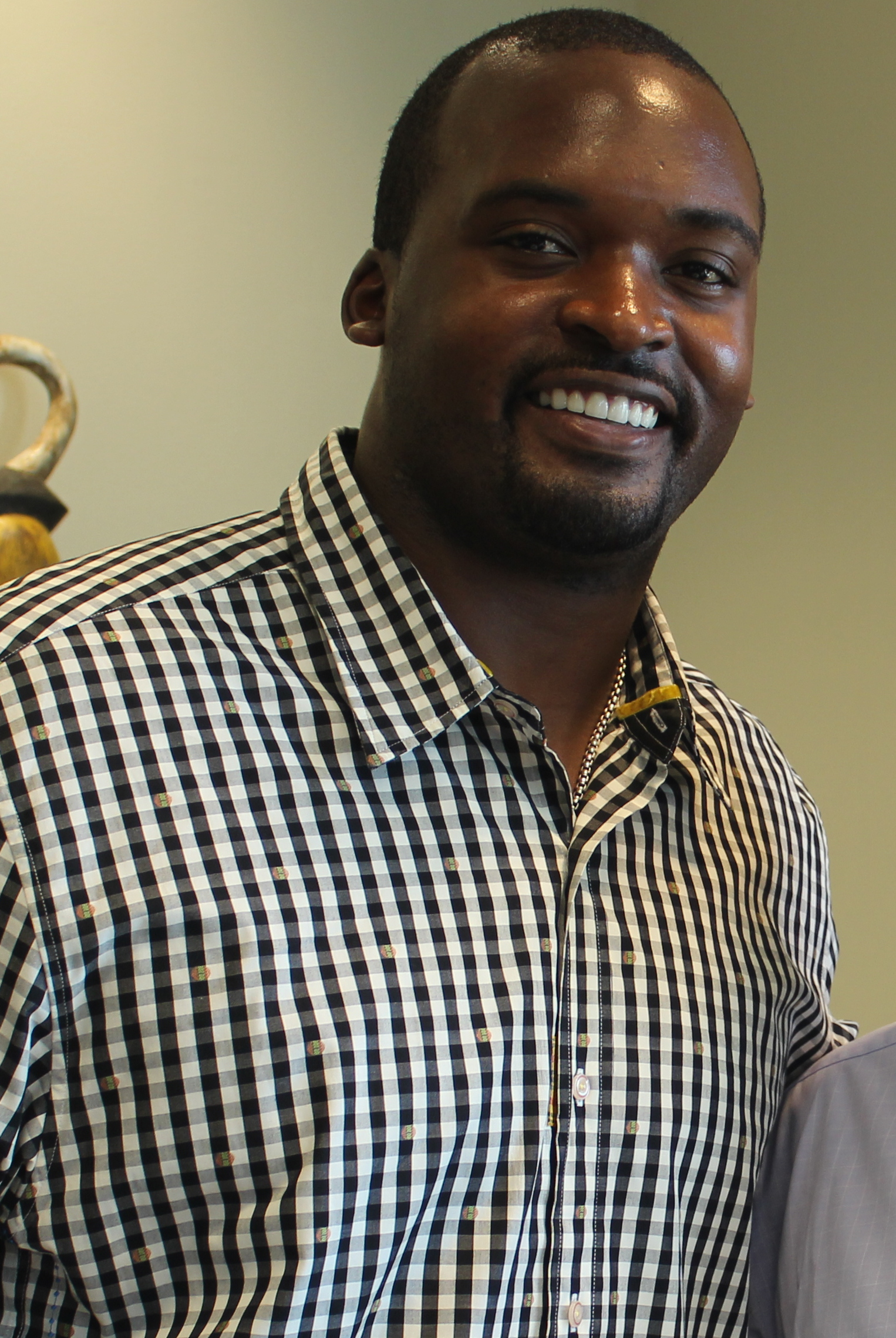
- Kiwanuka in 2013

No. 97, 94
- Position: Defensive end

Personal information
- Born: March 8, 1983 (age 43); Indianapolis, Indiana, U.S.
- Listed height: 6 ft 6 in (1.98 m)
- Listed weight: 267 lb (121 kg)

Career information
- High school: Cathedral (Indianapolis)
- College: Boston College (2001–2005)
- NFL draft: 2006: 1st round, 32nd overall pick

Career history
- New York Giants (2006–2014)

Awards and highlights
- 2× Super Bowl champion (XLII, XLVI); 2× First-team All-American (2004, 2005); Big East Defensive Player of the Year (2004); 2× First-team All-Big East (2003, 2004); First-team All-ACC (2005)

Career NFL statistics
- Total tackles: 412
- Sacks: 38.5
- Forced fumbles: 13
- Fumble recoveries: 3
- Interceptions: 3
- Stats at Pro Football Reference

Mathias Kagimu Kiwanuka (born March 8, 1983) is an American former professional football player who was a defensive end in the National Football League (NFL). He was selected 32nd overall in the 2006 NFL draft. He played college football for the Boston College Eagles. He won two Super Bowls with the Giants in Super Bowl XLII and Super Bowl XLVI, beating the New England Patriots twice.

== Early life ==
Kiwanuka was born in Indianapolis, Indiana and attended St. Simon the Apostle elementary/middle school and Cathedral High School, where he led the team to 3 straight IHSAA state championships and a national #5 ranking. At Cathedral he played tight end and linebacker and played with future NFL player OT Jeremy Trueblood.

== College career ==
Kiwanuka played in 49 games with 38 starts for Boston College and recorded 245 tackles (155 solo) and set school records with 37.5 sacks and 64.5 stops for losses. Also, he recovered 2 fumbles, including 1 for a 49-yard score, and had 3 forced fumbles. Also deflected 13 passes and intercepted 3 others, returning one 32 yards for a touchdown. Kiwanuka, who was widely regarded as one of the best pass rushing defensive ends in college, led the Big East Conference in sacks during the 2003 and 2004 seasons with 11.5 each season. He was an All-American in 2005. He finished his senior season with 51 tackles (34 solo) with 9.5 sacks and 16.5 tackles for losses. In 2005, he was involved in an incident with Virginia offensive tackle Brad Butler, who hit Kiwanuka with a chop-block in the back of his leg several seconds after the whistle. Butler was suspended by his own team for the following week's game because of his conduct on this play. Kiwanuka was forced to miss Boston College's next game because of injury, and Butler received a one-game suspension. Kiwanuka was later ejected from the game for throwing a punch. He was a First-team All-American in 2004 and was named Big East Defensive Player of the Year in 2004, as he produced 11.5 sacks, 24.5 stops for losses and 67 tackles (36 solo). Kiwanuka also picked off 2 passes, returning one 32 yards for a touchdown. In 2003, he earned All-Big East honors while leading the conference with 11.5 sacks. As a redshirt freshman in 2002, he appeared in every game, starting the first 2 at left defensive end. He made 44 tackles (27 solo) with 5 sacks and 7.5 stops for losses.

== Professional career ==
Pre-draft measurables
| Height | Weight | Arm length | Hand span | 40-yard dash | 10-yard split | 20-yard split | 20-yard shuttle | Three-cone drill | Vertical jump | Broad jump | Bench press | Wonderlic |
|---|---|---|---|---|---|---|---|---|---|---|---|---|
| 6 ft 5 3/4 in (1.97 m) | 266 lb (121 kg) | 34 3/4 in (0.88 m) | 9 7/8 in (0.25 m) | 4.72 s | 1.63 s | 2.79 s | 4.13 s | 7.27 s | 32 in (0.81 m) | 10 ft 0 in (3.05 m) | 17 reps | 29 |
All values from NFL Combine

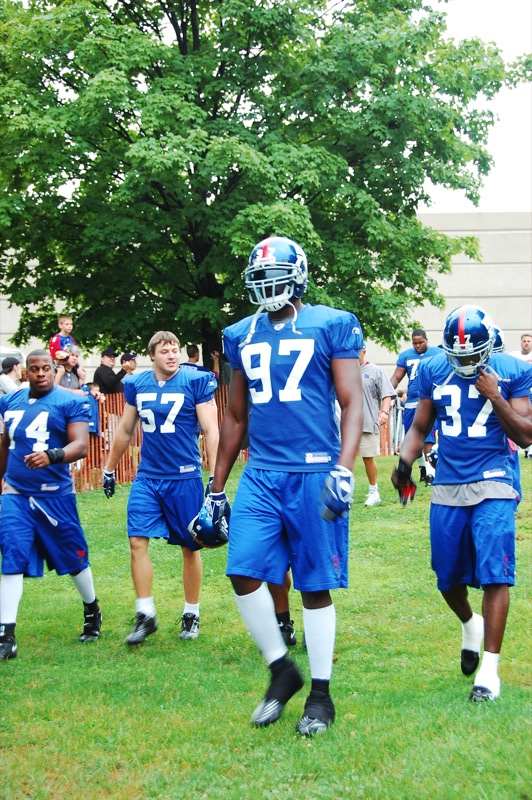
Kiwanuka (97) in 2007

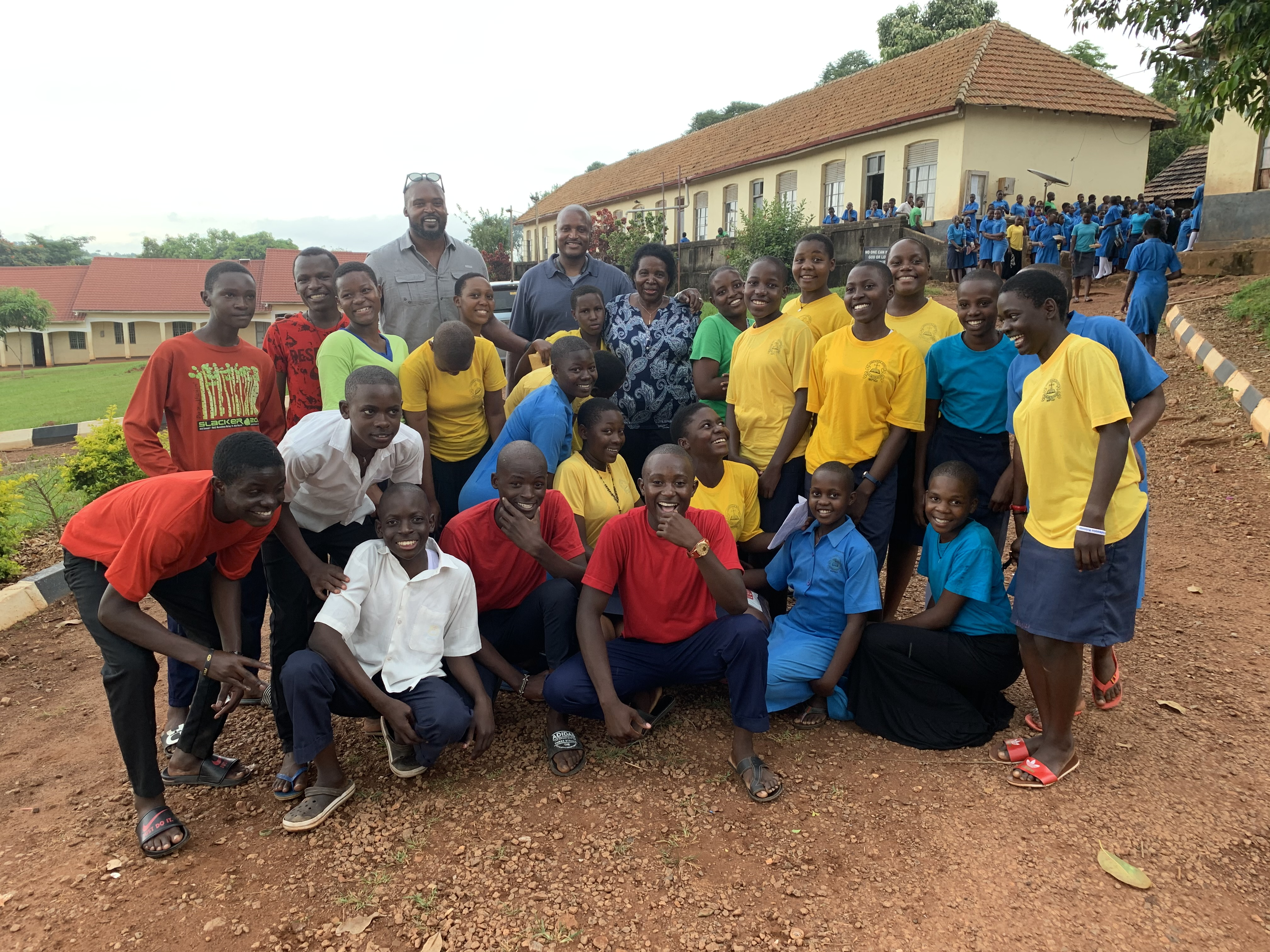
Kiwanuka is pictured with students from St. Joseph's (Konge), during the dedication of his most recent gift to the school. His mother, who was taught by her father is a graduate.

Kiwanuka was selected with the 32nd overall pick of the 2006 NFL draft by the New York Giants. On July 25, 2006, he signed a five-year $10 million contract with $5 million guaranteed. In his first season, he played defensive end and played in all 16 regular season games with 9 starts and finished the season with 55 tackles (41 solo), 4 sacks, 2 interceptions and 2 forced fumbles. In 2007, he won the starting strongside linebacker position after spending the entire offseason learning the new position following a rookie year spent at defensive end. On September 30, 2007, Kiwanuka recorded 7 tackles and 3 sacks in a 16–3 victory over the Philadelphia Eagles. Kiwanuka's season ended at Detroit on November 18, 2007, when he suffered a fractured left fibula. He had surgery to stabilize his leg and ankle the following morning and was placed on Injured Reserve, ending his 2007 season. He started all 10 games in which he played and finished the season with 47 tackles (24 solo), 4.5 sacks, 4 passes defensed, 1 forced fumble. Meanwhile, the Giants went on to win the Super Bowl.

In 2008, Kiwanuka entered training camp as the starting strongside linebacker, but returned to defensive end when Osi Umenyiora suffered a season-ending knee injury during the preseason. On December 14, 2008, Kiwanuka recorded a safety, recorded 5 tackles, and forced a fumble in a loss against the Dallas Cowboys. He started all 16 games and the NFC Divisional Playoff game at right defensive end and finished the season with 59 tackles (28 solo), 8.0 sacks, 13 tackles for loss, 2 passes defensed, 2 forced fumbles and 2 fumble recoveries.

Through the 2008 season, Kiwanuka had played in 42 regular season games with 35 starts – 25 starts at defensive end and 10 starts at strongside linebacker. He has also started 2 postseason games at defensive end. In 3 seasons, he has 161 tackles (93 solo), 16.5 sacks, 2 interceptions and 5 forced fumbles.

Kiwanuka was placed on injured reserve on October 28, 2010, due to a herniated disc.

On April 27, 2012, the Giants extended Kiwanuka's contract, giving him $16.5 million over 3 years with $10.5 million guaranteed.

While playing with the Giants, Kiwanuka was a resident of Hoboken, New Jersey.

On February 21, 2013, the Giants and Kiwanuka agreed on a restructured contract. The restructured deal, converted $1.5 million of Kiwanuka's 2013 guaranteed base salary into a signing bonus. The new deal saved the Giants approximately $1 million towards their 2013 salary cap, but slightly increased his cap number in both 2014 and 2015. On February 24, 2015, Kiwanuka was released.

== NFL career statistics ==
Legend
| **Bold** | Career high |

=== Regular season ===
| Year | Team | Games | | Tackles | | | | | Interceptions | | | | | Fumbles | | | |
| Year | Team | GP | GS | Cmb | Solo | Ast | Sck | TFL | Int | Yds | TD | Lng | PD | FF | FR | Yds | TD |
|---|---|---|---|---|---|---|---|---|---|---|---|---|---|---|---|---|---|
| 2006 | NYG | **16** | 9 | 53 | 44 | 9 | 4.0 | 6 | **2** | **44** | 0 | **32** | **4** | **2** | 0 | 0 | 0 |
| 2007 | NYG | 10 | 9 | 46 | 34 | 12 | 4.5 | 8 | 0 | 0 | 0 | 0 | **4** | 1 | 0 | 0 | 0 |
| 2008 | NYG | **16** | **16** | 51 | 34 | 17 | **8.0** | 12 | 0 | 0 | 0 | 0 | 1 | **2** | **2** | 0 | 0 |
| 2009 | NYG | **16** | 6 | 61 | 46 | 15 | 3.0 | 10 | 0 | 0 | 0 | 0 | 1 | **2** | 0 | 0 | 0 |
| 2010 | NYG | 3 | 1 | 11 | 9 | 2 | 4.0 | 4 | 0 | 0 | 0 | 0 | 0 | 1 | 0 | 0 | 0 |
| 2011 | NYG | **16** | 15 | **84** | **62** | **22** | 3.5 | **14** | 1 | 9 | 0 | 9 | 2 | 1 | 1 | 0 | 0 |
| 2012 | NYG | **16** | 5 | 37 | 27 | 10 | 3.0 | 5 | 0 | 0 | 0 | 0 | 0 | 0 | 0 | 0 | 0 |
| 2013 | NYG | **16** | 10 | 41 | 25 | 16 | 6.0 | 8 | 0 | 0 | 0 | 0 | 2 | **2** | 0 | 0 | 0 |
| 2014 | NYG | 11 | 11 | 28 | 20 | 8 | 2.5 | 2 | 0 | 0 | 0 | 0 | 0 | **2** | 0 | 0 | 0 |
| | | 120 | 82 | 412 | 301 | 111 | 38.5 | 69 | 3 | 53 | 0 | 32 | 14 | 13 | 3 | 0 | 0 |

=== Playoffs ===
| Year | Team | Games | | Tackles | | | | | Interceptions | | | | | Fumbles | | | |
| Year | Team | GP | GS | Cmb | Solo | Ast | Sck | TFL | Int | Yds | TD | Lng | PD | FF | FR | Yds | TD |
|---|---|---|---|---|---|---|---|---|---|---|---|---|---|---|---|---|---|
| 2006 | NYG | 1 | **1** | **7** | **5** | **2** | 0.0 | 0 | 0 | 0 | 0 | 0 | 0 | 0 | 0 | 0 | 0 |
| 2008 | NYG | 1 | **1** | 0 | 0 | 0 | 0.0 | 0 | 0 | 0 | 0 | 0 | 0 | 0 | 0 | 0 | 0 |
| 2011 | NYG | **4** | **1** | 5 | 3 | **2** | **0.5** | 0 | 0 | 0 | 0 | 0 | 0 | 0 | 0 | 0 | 0 |
| | | 6 | 3 | 12 | 8 | 4 | 0.5 | 0 | 0 | 0 | 0 | 0 | 0 | 0 | 0 | 0 | 0 |

== Personal life ==
He is the grandson of Benedicto Kiwanuka, the first Prime Minister of Uganda. He is the youngest of three children. He is the younger brother of Ben Kiwanuka of Indianapolis, Indiana, and Mary Kiwanuka, a federal government attorney.

== See also ==
- Ugandan Americans
