= Jesse Mahelona =

American football player (1983–2009)

No. 69, 94
- Position: Defensive tackle

Personal information
- Born: April 7, 1983; Honolulu, Hawaii, U.S.
- Died: September 5, 2009 (aged 26); Kealakekua, Hawaii, U.S.
- Listed height: 6 ft 0 in (1.83 m)
- Listed weight: 311 lb (141 kg)

Career information
- High school: Kealakehe (HI)
- College: Tennessee
- NFL draft: 2006: 5th round, 169th overall pick

Career history
- Tennessee Titans (2006–2007); Miami Dolphins (2007); Atlanta Falcons (2007); Jacksonville Jaguars (2008)*
- * Offseason or practice squad member only

Awards and highlights
- First-team All-American (2004); Third-team All-American (2005); First-team All-SEC (2004)

Career NFL statistics
- Total tackles: 20
- Sacks: 1
- Stats at Pro Football Reference

Jesse Steven Kahuanani Mahelona (April 7, 1983 – September 5, 2009) was an American professional football player who was a defensive tackle in the National Football League (NFL). He played college football for the Tennessee Volunteers and was selected by the Tennessee Titans in the fifth round of the 2006 NFL draft.

In addition, Mahelona was a member of the Miami Dolphins, Atlanta Falcons, and Jacksonville Jaguars.

== College career ==
Mahelona attended and played college football at the University of Tennessee under head coach Phillip Fulmer. He contributed in the 2004 and 2005 seasons as a junior college transfer from Orange Coast College in Costa Mesa, California.

== Professional career ==
Pre-draft measurables
Height	Weight	Arm length	Hand span	40-yard dash	20-yard shuttle	Three-cone drill	Vertical jump	Broad jump	Bench press
6 ft 0 1/2 in (1.84 m)	311 lb (141 kg)	31 1/8 in (0.79 m)	9 1/8 in (0.23 m)	5.37 s	4.84 s	7.63 s	27.0 in (0.69 m)	7 ft 6 in (2.29 m)	27 reps
All values from NFL Combine/Pro Day

=== Tennessee Titans ===
He was selected by the Tennessee Titans in the fifth round of the 2006 NFL draft. He played ten games for the Titans in the 2006 season, and was released on September 11, 2007.

=== Miami Dolphins ===
On October 24, 2007, Mahelona was waived by the Miami Dolphins.

=== Atlanta Falcons ===
Mahelona was signed by the Atlanta Falcons on November 20 when Rod Coleman was placed on injured reserve. He was cut on December 29, 2007.

=== Jacksonville Jaguars ===
Mahelona was signed by the Jacksonville Jaguars on August 7, 2008, after defensive tackle Tywain Myles was waived. He was cut August 30. He did not make the opening day roster.

== Death ==
Mahelona was killed in an automobile accident in Hawaii early on the morning of September 5, 2009. Mahelona's vehicle collided with construction equipment. Police reported that speed and alcohol were factors in the crash.
