= Terna Nande =

American football player (born 1983)

No. 57
- Position: Linebacker

Personal information
- Born: June 17, 1983 (age 43); Grand Rapids, Michigan, U.S.
- Listed height: 6 ft 0 in (1.83 m)
- Listed weight: 230 lb (104 kg)

Career information
- High school: Creston (Grand Rapids)
- College: Miami (OH)
- NFL draft: 2006: 5th round, 137th overall pick

Career history
- Tennessee Titans (2006); Indianapolis Colts (2007)*; San Diego Chargers (2007–2008)*; BC Lions (2008–2009)
- * Offseason or practice squad member only

Awards and highlights
- First-team All-MAC (2004); Second-team All-MAC (2003)

Career NFL statistics
- Total tackles: 1
- Stats at Pro Football Reference
- Stats at CFL.ca (archive)

Terna Nande (born June 17, 1983) is an American former professional football player who was a linebacker in the National Football League (NFL) and Canadian Football League (CFL). He was selected by the Tennessee Titans in the fifth round of the 2006 NFL draft after becoming the first and only non-lineman and the lightest person (232 lbs.) in NFL history to bench press over 40 reps at the NFL Combine. He played college football for the Miami RedHawks.

Nande was also a member of the Indianapolis Colts and San Diego Chargers of the NFL and the BC Lions of the Canadian Football League (CFL).

Nande's parents, David and Veronica, came to the United States from Nigeria to pursue an education.

Pre-draft measurables
Height	Weight	Arm length	Hand span	40-yard dash	10-yard split	20-yard split	20-yard shuttle	Three-cone drill	Vertical jump	Broad jump	Bench press
6 ft 0 1/8 in (1.83 m)	232 lb (105 kg)	32 1/2 in (0.83 m)	9 5/8 in (0.24 m)	4.53 s	1.58 s	2.63 s	4.11 s	6.97 s	39.0 in (0.99 m)	10 ft 4 in (3.15 m)	41 reps
All values from NFL Combine
