= Guy Whimper =

American football player (born 1983)

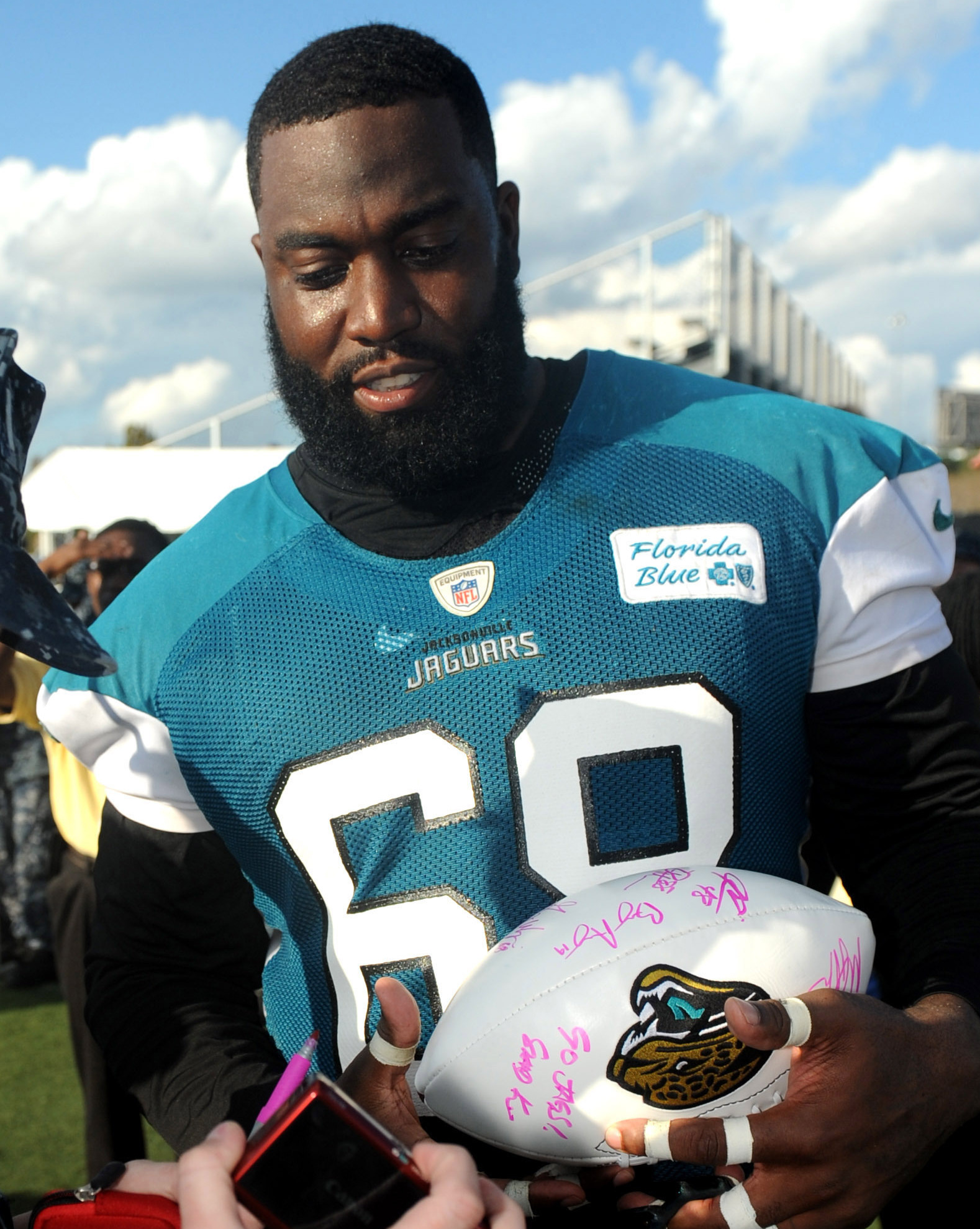
- Whimper with the Jacksonville Jaguars in 2012

No. 79, 68, 78
- Position: Offensive tackle

Personal information
- Born: May 21, 1983 (age 43); Honolulu, Hawaii, U.S.
- Listed height: 6 ft 5 in (1.96 m)
- Listed weight: 315 lb (143 kg)

Career information
- High school: Havelock (Havelock, North Carolina)
- College: East Carolina
- NFL draft: 2006: 4th round, 129th overall pick

Career history
- New York Giants (2006–2009); Jacksonville Jaguars (2010–2012); Pittsburgh Steelers (2013)

Awards and highlights
- Super Bowl champion (XLII)

Career NFL statistics
- Games played: 78
- Games started: 24
- Receptions: 3
- Receiving yards: 28
- Receiving touchdowns: 1
- Stats at Pro Football Reference

Guy Whimper (born May 21, 1983) is an American former professional football player who was an offensive tackle in the National Football League (NFL). He was selected in the fourth round (129th overall) of the 2006 NFL draft by the New York Giants. Whimper played college football for the East Carolina Pirates.

Whimper was also a member of the Jacksonville Jaguars and Pittsburgh Steelers.

== Professional career ==
Pre-draft measurables
Height	Weight	Arm length	Hand span	40-yard dash	10-yard split	20-yard split	20-yard shuttle	Three-cone drill	Vertical jump	Broad jump	Bench press
6 ft 4 3/4 in (1.95 m)	304 lb (138 kg)	34 1/8 in (0.87 m)	10 in (0.25 m)	4.96 s	1.74 s	2.88 s	4.59 s	7.38 s	29.0 in (0.74 m)	8 ft 6 in (2.59 m)	26 reps
All values from NFL Combine

=== New York Giants ===
Whimper was waived by the New York Giants on September 4, 2010.

=== Jacksonville Jaguars ===
Whimper was signed by the Jacksonville Jaguars on November 2, 2010.

On October 28, 2012, Whimper was made an eligible receiver and successfully caught a pass for a touchdown against the Green Bay Packers.

Whimper was released by the Jaguars on February 27, 2013.

=== Pittsburgh Steelers ===
On May 6, 2013, Whimper was signed by the Pittsburgh Steelers.

On March 17, 2014, the Steelers re-signed Whimper to a one-year contract.
