= Sean Conover =

American football player (born 1984)

No. 77
- Position: Defensive end

Personal information
- Born: July 31, 1984 (age 42); Brockton, Massachusetts, U.S.
- Listed height: 6 ft 5 in (1.96 m)
- Listed weight: 275 lb (125 kg)

Career information
- College: Bucknell
- NFL draft: 2006: undrafted

Career history
- Tennessee Titans (2006–2007); Atlanta Falcons (2008)*; Baltimore Ravens (2008)*; New York Jets (2009)*; Detroit Lions (2009)*; St. Louis Rams (2009–2010)*; Hartford Colonials (2010)*
- * Offseason or practice squad member only

Awards and highlights
- Second-team Little All-American (2004); 2× All-Patriot League (2004-2005); Patriot League Defensive P.O.Y. (2004)

Career NFL statistics
- Total tackles: 10
- Pass deflections: 1
- Stats at Pro Football Reference

Sean Wayne Conover (born July 31, 1984) is an American former professional football player who was a defensive end in the National Football League (NFL). He was signed by the Tennessee Titans as an undrafted free agent in 2006. He played college football for the Bucknell Bison.

Conover was also a member of the Atlanta Falcons, Baltimore Ravens, New York Jets, Detroit Lions, St. Louis Rams and Hartford Colonials.

== Early life ==
Conover graduated from Whitman-Hanson Regional High School, where he earned three varsity letters each in football and basketball, and one in baseball. The football team captured league championships in 2000 and 2001 and were Division 3 state champs in 2001 and runner-up in 2000. He was an All-league selection and the WATD Distinguished Player of the Year. Additionally, he was a Shriner's All-Star selection and a two-time All-league performer and team captain in basketball, leading the league in scoring as a senior.

== College career ==
Conover played college football at Bucknell University. In his four-year career with the Bison, he played in 36 games and made 34 consecutive starts. Finished career with 142 tackles, 33 tackles for loss, 17.5 sacks (fifth in school history), nine fumbles forced, three fumble recoveries and nine passes defensed.

Conover, as senior, started all 11 games and repeated as First-team All-Patriot League selection. He also earned George Rieu Award as team's top defensive lineman for second year and received Pete Pedrick Award as most improved Bucknell athlete in senior class (in any sport). He completed senior season with 44 tackles, nine tackles for loss and three sacks. He also played tight end and hauled in seven receptions for 102 yards. As junior, Conover started all 11 games and named Patriot League Defensive Player of the Year. He also earned Second-team All-America honors from Associated Press. Also earned First-team All-Patriot League, George Rieu Award as Bucknell's top defensive lineman and Tom Gadd Coaches' Award. For the year he recorded career-highs in tackles (55), sacks (10.5), tackles for loss (18), forced fumbles (5) and passes defensed (4).

As a sophomore Conover was impressive in his debut on defense as one of five defensive players to start all 12 games. He finished with 43 tackles (20 solo) and led team with 4.0 sacks and had six tackles for loss and forced team-high three fumbles and batted down three passes. He earned Tom Gadd Coaches' Award at season's end, given in recognition of a player's commitment to the Bucknell football program . In 2002 as a Freshman he played tight end and made two varsity appearances on special teams. He caught five passes for 61 yards and made six special teams tackles for the junior varsity squad.

== Professional career ==
=== Pre-draft ===
Conover measured 6 ft 5 1/8 in (1.959 m) and 275 lb (125 kg) and ran a 40 yd (37 m) dash in 4.81 seconds.

=== Tennessee Titans ===
Conover was signed as an undrafted free agent by the Tennessee Titans. As a rookie in 2006, he played six games with two starts and totaled 21 tackles, one tackle for loss and two quarterback pressures after spending the first 11 weeks of season on practice squad.

By playing for the Titans, Conover became the 40th member of the Bucknell Bison to play in the NFL. He played the 2007 season with the Titans as a backup and totaled one tackle in five games before being released.

=== St. Louis Rams ===
Conover was signed to the St. Louis Rams' practice squad on November 28, 2009. He was signed to a future contract on January 6, 2010.
