= Sinorice Moss =

American gridiron football player (born 1983)

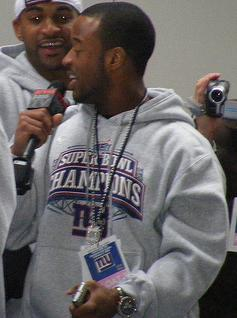
- Moss at the New York Giants' Super Bowl parade in 2008

No. 83
- Position: Wide receiver

Personal information
- Born: December 28, 1983 (age 42); Miami, Florida, U.S.
- Listed height: 5 ft 8 in (1.73 m)
- Listed weight: 185 lb (84 kg)

Career information
- High school: Miami Carol City (Miami Gardens, Florida)
- College: Miami (FL) (2002–2005)
- NFL draft: 2006: 2nd round, 44th overall pick

Career history
- New York Giants (2006–2010); Philadelphia Eagles (2011)*; Saskatchewan Roughriders (2012)
- * Offseason or practice squad member only

Awards and highlights
- Super Bowl champion (XLII)

Career NFL statistics
- Receptions: 39
- Receiving yards: 421
- Receiving touchdowns: 3
- Stats at Pro Football Reference
- Stats at CFL.ca (archive)

Sinorice Travonce Moss (born December 28, 1983) is an American former professional football player who was a wide receiver in the National Football League (NFL) and Canadian Football League (CFL). He was selected by the New York Giants in the second round of the 2006 NFL draft. He also played in the CFL for the Saskatchewan Roughriders. Moss played college football at the University of Miami.

Moss's older brother, Santana, is a former wide receiver who played in the NFL for 14 seasons as a member of the New York Jets and Washington Redskins. His younger cousin, Zack Moss, is currently a free agent running back, most recently playing for the Cincinnati Bengals.

== College career ==
Moss played college football for the University of Miami Hurricanes, where he was a standout wide receiver. Before being drafted in the 2nd round of the 2006 NFL Draft by the New York Giants, Moss was rewarded MVP of the 2006 Senior Bowl.

Moss was also a track star at the University of Miami, where he recorded personal bests of 6.42 seconds in the 55 meters and 10.50 seconds in the 100 meters.

Personal bests

Event	Time (seconds)	Venue	Date
55 meters	6.42	Gainesville, Florida	January 17, 2004
100 meters	10.50	Coral Springs, Florida	May 11, 2002

== Professional career ==
Pre-draft measurables
Height	Weight	Arm length	Hand span	40-yard dash	10-yard split	20-yard split	Vertical jump	Broad jump
5 ft 8 in (1.73 m)	185 lb (84 kg)	29 1/8 in (0.74 m)	9 in (0.23 m)	4.38 s	1.51 s	2.58 s	42 in (1.07 m)	10 ft 3 in (3.12 m)
All values from NFL Combine/Central Florida Pro Day.

=== New York Giants ===
Moss was selected by the New York Giants with the 44th overall pick in the second round of the 2006 NFL draft out of the University of Miami.

The Giants expected to groom Moss to be their slot receiver in 2006 but his progress was marred by a recurring quadriceps injury, which caused him to miss training camp and limited him to five receptions during his rookie season in six games. In 2007, Moss played in 13 games, the year of Giants' Super Bowl XLII victory.

After two seasons with the Giants that produced only 26 receptions for 230 yards and no touchdowns, Moss vowed to improve in the 2008 campaign. However, Mario Manningham and Hakeem Nicks, quickly surpassed Moss on the depth chart.

Prior to the 2010 season, Domenik Hixon, who had taken the return job away from Moss during the 2009 season, tore his ACL and was placed on injured reserve. During the preseason, Moss competed for the return specialist job, but suffered from a sports hernia and on August 31, 2010, was placed on season-ending injured reserve. Moss was officially waived by the Giants on November 9, 2010, after reaching an injury settlement. Primarily because of injuries, he departed New York after a five-year career that included just three touchdowns.

=== Philadelphia Eagles ===
Moss was signed by the Philadelphia Eagles to a future contract on January 10, 2011. He was released on September 3 during final roster cuts.

=== Saskatchewan Roughriders ===
On April 24, 2012, Moss was signed by the Saskatchewan Roughriders. After playing in only two regular season games, Moss was released during the following off-season on March 8, 2013.

== Personal life ==
Since retiring from football, Moss has quietly begun pursuing a career as an actor. He has one son, Sinorice Moss Jr.
