= Brandon Jones (wide receiver) =

American football player (born 1982)

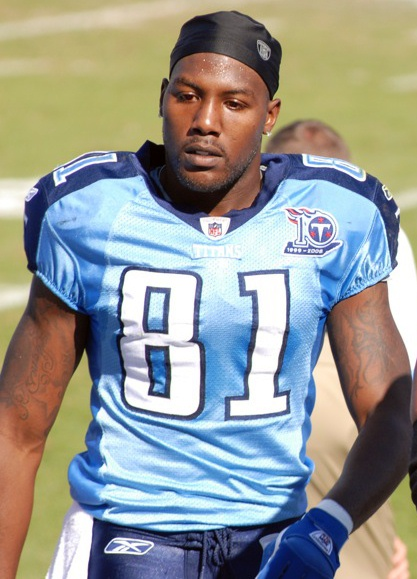
- Jones with the Tennessee Titans in 2008

No. 17, 81
- Position: Wide receiver

Personal information
- Born: October 6, 1982 (age 44); Texarkana, Texas, U.S.
- Listed height: 6 ft 1 in (1.85 m)
- Listed weight: 212 lb (96 kg)

Career information
- High school: Liberty-Eylau (Texarkana)
- College: Oklahoma
- NFL draft: 2005: 3rd round, 96th overall pick

Career history
- Tennessee Titans (2005–2008); San Francisco 49ers (2009); Seattle Seahawks (2010)*; Baltimore Ravens (2011)*
- * Offseason or practice squad member only

Career NFL statistics
- Receptions: 113
- Receiving yards: 1,398
- Receiving touchdowns: 9
- Stats at Pro Football Reference

Brandon Cornell Jones (born October 6, 1982) is an American former professional football player who was a wide receiver in the National Football League (NFL). He played college football for the Oklahoma Sooners. He was selected by the Tennessee Titans in the third round of the 2005 NFL draft. Jones also played for the San Francisco 49ers.

== Baseball career ==
Jones was drafted by the New York Yankees in the 28th Round (845th overall pick) of June 2001 amateur entry draft; however, he did not sign.

== Football career ==
Pre-draft measurables
Height	Weight	Arm length	Hand span	40-yard dash	10-yard split	20-yard split	20-yard shuttle	Three-cone drill	Vertical jump	Broad jump
6 ft 1 3/8 in (1.86 m)	208 lb (94 kg)	33 1/8 in (0.84 m)	10 in (0.25 m)	4.42 s	1.59 s	2.61 s	4.09 s	7.03 s	37.0 in (0.94 m)	9 ft 6 in (2.90 m)
All values from NFL Combine/Pro Day

=== Tennessee Titans ===
Jones was selected in the third round (96th overall) of the 2005 NFL Draft behind teammates Mark Clayton and Mark Bradley by the Tennessee Titans.

=== San Francisco 49ers ===
On February 28, 2009, he was signed by the San Francisco 49ers to a five-year, $16.5 million contract with $5.4 million in guaranteed money. He finished the season playing in eight games, recording his only reception of the season during the 49ers' week 13 loss to the Seattle Seahawks for 18 yards.

On August 18, 2010, he was released by the 49ers.

=== Seattle Seahawks ===
On August 22, 2010, he was signed by the Seattle Seahawks.

=== Baltimore Ravens ===
On February 12, 2011, he was signed by the Baltimore Ravens. He was released on September 3, 2011.
