= Palmyra (disambiguation) =

Palmyra is the ancient Greek name for the Syrian city of Tadmur.

For the modern city of Palmyra (near ancient Palmyra) see Palmyra (modern city)

Palmyra may also refer to:

== Places ==
=== Australia ===
- Palmyra, Queensland, a locality in the Mackay Region
- Palmyra, Western Australia

=== United Kingdom ===
- Palmyra Square, part of the cultural quarter, location of Parr Hall in the town of Warrington, Cheshire

=== United States ===
- Palmyra, Georgia
- Palmyra, Illinois
- Palmyra, Edwards County, Illinois, ghost town
- Palmyra, Lee County, Illinois
- Palmyra, Indiana
- Palmyra, Maine
- Palmyra, Michigan
- Palmyra, Missouri
- Palmyra, Nebraska
- Palmyra, New Jersey
  - Palmyra station, a River Line station in Palmyra, New Jersey
- Palmyra (town), New York
- Palmyra (village), New York
- Palmyra, Knox County, Ohio
- Palmyra Township, Portage County, Ohio
- Palmyra, Pennsylvania
- Palmyra, Tennessee
- Palmyra, Utah
- Palmyra, Virginia
- Palmyra, Wisconsin, village
- Palmyra (town), Wisconsin
- Palmyra Township (disambiguation), multiple locations
- North Palmyra Township, Macoupin County, Illinois
- South Palmyra Township, Macoupin County, Illinois

==== Other places ====
- Palmyra Atoll in the Pacific Ocean, United States
- Palmyra Peak, a summit in Colorado, U.S.

== Other uses ==
- Palmyra High School (disambiguation)
- Palmyra Palm (Borassus), a genus of palm tree
- Borassus flabellifer, a species of palm tree known as Palmyra palm
- Tacony–Palmyra Bridge, across the Delaware River
- SS Palmyra, a number of steamships with this name
- Palmyra, a low code application development framework provided by Vermeg
- Battle of Palmyra (disambiguation), various battles of Palmyra such as:
  - Palmyra offensive (2024), military offensive

== See also ==
- Palmira (disambiguation)
- Palmyra offensive (disambiguation)
- Tadmor (planet)
