= 2014 Philadelphia Eagles season =

82nd season in franchise history

- Owner: Jeffrey Lurie
- General manager: Howie Roseman
- Head coach: Chip Kelly
- Home stadium: Lincoln Financial Field

Results
- Record: 10–6
- Division place: 2nd NFC East
- Playoffs: Did not qualify
- All-Pros: 4: OT Jason Peters (2nd team); DE Fletcher Cox (2nd team); OLB Connor Barwin (2nd team); RS Darren Sproles (2nd team)
- Pro Bowlers: 9: RB LeSean McCoy; WR Jeremy Maclin; T Jason Peters; G Evan Mathis; C Jason Kelce; OLB Connor Barwin; K Cody Parkey; RS Darren Sproles; LS Jon Dorenbos

Uniform
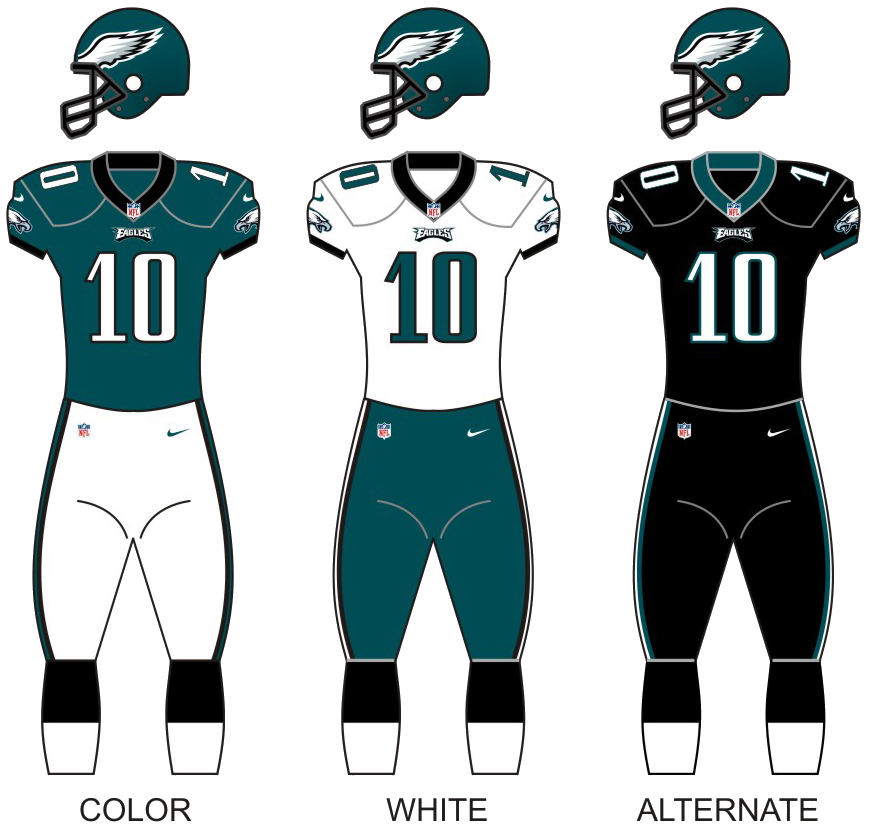

The 2014 season was the Philadelphia Eagles' 82nd in the National Football League (NFL) and their second under head coach Chip Kelly. The Eagles led the NFC East for most of the year, but were eliminated from playoff contention when the Dallas Cowboys defeated the Indianapolis Colts in week 16.

Quarterback Nick Foles led them to a 6–2 start, despite struggling with turnovers more so than he did in 2013, where he threw only two interceptions and lost one fumble. Foles was injured in week 9, causing backup Mark Sanchez to take over as starting quarterback. The Eagles then went 4–4 in the last eight games with two losses against their division rivals, the Cowboys and Redskins.

Despite missing the playoffs, they had nine selections for the 2015 Pro Bowl, second only to the Denver Broncos, who had 11.

== Roster changes ==
=== Free agents ===
Position	Player	Tag	2014 Team	Notes
S	Nate Allen	UFA	Philadelphia Eagles	1 year/$2 million deal
S	Colt Anderson	UFA	Indianapolis Colts	
S	Kurt Coleman	UFA	Minnesota Vikings	
WR	Riley Cooper	UFA	Philadelphia Eagles	Signed 5-year/$22.5 million deal
DE	Clifton Geathers	UFA	Washington Redskins	
OLB	Phillip Hunt	RFA	Indianapolis Colts	
P	Donnie Jones	UFA	Philadelphia Eagles	Signed 3-year/$5.5 million deal
WR	Jeremy Maclin	UFA	Philadelphia Eagles	Signed 1 year/$5.5 million deal
DE	Cedric Thornton	ERFA	Philadelphia Eagles	Signed 1-year deal
QB	Michael Vick	UFA	New York Jets	Signed 1 year/$5 million deal

Player re-signed by the Eagles

==== Signings ====
Position	Player	Tag	2013 Team	Date signed	Notes and references
S	Malcolm Jenkins	UFA	New Orleans Saints	March 11	Signed 3-year/$15.5 million deal
S	Chris Maragos	UFA	Seattle Seahawks	March 12	Signed 3-year/$4 million deal
OLB	Bryan Braman	UFA	Houston Texans	March 12	Signed 2-year/$3.15 million deal
CB	Nolan Carroll	UFA	Miami Dolphins	March 13	Signed 2-year/$3.65 million deal
QB	Mark Sanchez	UFA	New York Jets	March 27	Signed 1 Year/$2.25 million deal

==== Trades ====
- On March 13, the Eagles traded their fifth round selection from the New England Patriots to the New Orleans Saints for running back Darren Sproles.
- On May 10, the Eagles traded running back Bryce Brown and a 2014 seventh-round pick (No. 237 overall) to Buffalo for a 2014 seventh-round pick (No. 224 overall) and either a 2015 fourth-round pick or a 2016 third-round pick or a 2016 fourth-round pick.
- On August 19, the Eagles Acquired RB Kenjon Barner from the Carolina Panthers in exchange for a conditional seventh-round draft pick in 2015. Barner was later cut and the Panthers would receive no compensation.
- On August 20, the Eagles Acquired kicker Cody Parkey from the Indianapolis Colts in exchange for RB David Fluellen. Parkey would later win the starting kicker position.

=== Roster changes ===
On March 28, 2014, after what was the statistically best season in his career, the Eagles released wide receiver DeSean Jackson. As a free agent, he signed with the Eagles' division rival, the Washington Redskins, on April 2, 2014. The team made headlines when, on May 5, they signed Alejandro Villanueva, who is an Army Ranger, having served three tours of duty in Afghanistan, and has not played football since 2009.

== 2014 draft class ==
2014 Philadelphia Eagles Draft
Round	Selection	Player	Position	College
1	26 (Note: The Eagles traded their original first-round selection (No. 22 overall) to the Cleveland Browns in exchange for the Browns' first- and third-round selections – Nos. 26 and 83 overall, respectively. The Eagles later traded the No. 83 overall selection to the Houston Texans in exchange for the Texans' fourth- and fifth-round selections (Nos. 101 and 141 overall, respectively).)	Marcus Smith	OLB	Louisville
2	42 (Note: The Eagles traded their original second- and fourth-round selections (Nos. 54 and 122 overall, respectively) to the Tennessee Titans in exchange for the Titans' second-round selection (No. 42 overall).)	Jordan Matthews	WR	Vanderbilt
3	86	Josh Huff	WR	Oregon
4	101	Jaylen Watkins	CB	Florida
5 (Note: The Eagles traded their sixth-round selection (No. 198 overall) and defensive tackle Isaac Sopoaga to the New England Patriots in exchange for the Patriots' fifth-round selection – No. 169 overall. The Eagles later traded the No. 169 selection to the New Orleans Saints in exchange for running back Darren Sproles.)	141	Taylor Hart	DE	Oregon
5	162	Ed Reynolds	S	Stanford
6	None			
7	224 (Note: The Eagles traded running back Bryce Brown and their original seventh-round selection (No. 237 overall) to the Buffalo Bills in exchange for the Bills' seventh-round selection (No. 224 overall). The trade also includes a conditional future draft selection, which the Eagles could receive from the Bills in either 2015 or 2016. If Brown hits undisclosed statistical rushing targets with the Bills in 2014, the Eagles will receive the Bills' 2016 third-round selection, otherwise, the Eagles could receive the Bills' 2015 fourth-round selection, which the Bills conditionally acquired in a trade that sent wide receiver Stevie Johnson to the San Francisco 49ers. However, if Johnson does not meet certain statistical receiving targets with the 49ers in 2014, the Bills' trade with the 49ers will be voided, and if Brown does not meet certain statistical rushing targets with the Bills in 2014, the Eagles will not receive a future draft selection from the Bills.)	Beau Allen	NT	Wisconsin

Draft trades

=== Undrafted free agents ===
Position	Player	College	Notes
K	Carey Spear	Vanderbilt	
WR	Quron Pratt	Rutgers	
WR	Kadron Boone	LSU	
CB	John Fulton	Alabama	
RB	Henry Josey	Missouri	
S	Daytawion Lowe	Oklahoma State	
RB	David Fluellen	Toledo	
TE	Trey Burton	Florida	
DE	Frank Mayes	Florida A&M	
G/C	Josh Andrews	Oregon State	
G	Karim Barton	Morgan State	
NT	Wade Keliikipi	Oregon	
OT	Kevin Graf	USC	
G	Donald Hawkins	Texas	
TE	Blake Annen	Cincinnati	

== Personnel ==
=== Staff / Coaches ===
2014 Philadelphia Eagles staff
Front office: Chairman/CEO – Jeffrey Lurie; President – Don Smolenski; general manager – Howie Roseman; Vice president of player personnel – Tom Gamble; Director of college scouting – Anthony Patch; Director of pro personnel – Rick Mueller; Senior football advisor – Tom Donahoe; Assistant director of player personnel – Ed Marynowitz; Assistant director of college scouting – Michael Bradway; Head coaches: Head coach – Chip Kelly; Assistant head coach/defensive line – Jerry Azzinaro; Offensive coaches: Offensive coordinator – Pat Shurmur; Quarterbacks – Bill Musgrave; Running backs – Duce Staley; Wide receivers – Bob Bicknell; Tight ends – Ted Williams; Assistant tight ends – Justin Peelle; Offensive line – Jeff Stoutland; Assistant offensive line – Greg Austin; Offensive quality control – Press Taylor	Defensive coaches: Defensive coordinator – Bill Davis; Assistant defensive line – Mike Dawson; Outside linebackers – Bill McGovern; Inside linebackers – Rick Minter; Defensive backs – John Lovett; Assistant defensive backs – Todd Lyght; Defensive quality control – Michael Clay; Special teams coaches: Special teams coordinator – Dave Fipp; Assistant special teams – Matthew Harper; Strength and conditioning: Director of sports science and reconditioning – Shaun Huls; Strength and conditioning – Josh Hingst; Assistant strength and conditioning – Quadrian Banks; Assistant strength and conditioning – Keith Gray

== Final roster ==
2014 Philadelphia Eagles roster
Quarterbacks (QB): 2 Matt Barkley; 9 Nick Foles; 3 Mark Sanchez; Running backs (RB): 25 LeSean McCoy; 32 Chris Polk; 43 Darren Sproles PR; Wide receivers (WR): 14 Riley Cooper; 11 Josh Huff KR; 18 Jeremy Maclin; 88 Jeff Maehl; 81 Jordan Matthews; 16 Brad Smith; Tight ends (TE): 47 Trey Burton; 85 James Casey; 87 Brent Celek; 86 Zach Ertz	Offensive linemen (OL): 66 Andrew Gardner G/T; 69 Evan Mathis G; 65 Lane Johnson T; 62 Jason Kelce C; 67 Dennis Kelly G; 63 David Molk C; 71 Jason Peters T; 64 Matt Tobin T; 61 Julian Vandervelde C; Defensive linemen (DL): 94 Beau Allen NT; 93 Brandon Bair DE; 91 Fletcher Cox DE; 75 Vinny Curry DE; 97 Taylor Hart DE; 96 Bennie Logan NT; 72 Cedric Thornton DE	Linebackers (LB): 51 Emmanuel Acho ILB; 98 Connor Barwin OLB; 56 Bryan Braman OLB; 58 Trent Cole OLB; 55 Brandon Graham OLB; 95 Mychal Kendricks ILB; 50 Casey Matthews ILB; 90 Marcus Smith OLB; Defensive backs (DB): 29 Nate Allen SS; 22 Brandon Boykin CB; 23 Nolan Carroll CB; 21 Jerome Couplin FS; 24 Bradley Fletcher CB; 27 Malcolm Jenkins FS; 42 Chris Maragos FS; 33 Chris Prosinski SS; 37 Jaylen Watkins CB; 26 Cary Williams CB; Special teams (ST): 46 Jon Dorenbos LS; 8 Donnie Jones P; 1 Cody Parkey K	Practice squad: 68 Josh Andrews G; 41 Kenjon Barner RB; 77 Kevin Graf T; 54 Brandon Hepburn LB; 74 Wade Keliikipi NT; 4 G. J. Kinne QB; 84 Will Murphy WR; 10 Quron Pratt WR; 30 Ed Reynolds S; 39 Matthew Tucker RB; Reserve: 76 Allen Barbre T (IR); 53 Najee Goode ILB (IR); 79 Todd Herremans G (IR); 57 Travis Long OLB (IR); 59 DeMeco Ryans ILB (IR); 28 Earl Wolff SS (IR); Rookies in italics 53 active, 6 reserve, 10 practice squad

== Schedule ==
=== Preseason ===
Week	Date	Opponent	Result	Record	Venue	Recap
1	August 8	at Chicago Bears	**L** 28–34	0–1	Soldier Field	Recap
2	August 15	at New England Patriots	**L** 35–42	0–2	Gillette Stadium	Recap
3	August 21	Pittsburgh Steelers	**W** 31–21	1–2	Lincoln Financial Field	Recap
4	August 28	New York Jets	**W** 37–7	2–2	Lincoln Financial Field	Recap

=== Regular season ===
Week	Date	Opponent	Result	Record	Venue	Recap
1	September 7	Jacksonville Jaguars	**W** 34–17	1–0	Lincoln Financial Field	Recap
2	September 15	at Indianapolis Colts	**W** 30–27	2–0	Lucas Oil Stadium	Recap
3	September 21	**Washington Redskins**	**W** 37–34	3–0	Lincoln Financial Field	Recap
4	September 28	at San Francisco 49ers	**L** 21–26	3–1	Levi's Stadium	Recap
5	October 5	St. Louis Rams	**W** 34–28	4–1	Lincoln Financial Field	Recap
6	October 12	**New York Giants**	**W** 27–0	5–1	Lincoln Financial Field	Recap
7	Bye					
8	October 26	at Arizona Cardinals	**L** 20–24	5–2	University of Phoenix Stadium	Recap
9	November 2	at Houston Texans	**W** 31–21	6–2	NRG Stadium	Recap
10	November 10	Carolina Panthers	**W** 45–21	7–2	Lincoln Financial Field	Recap
11	November 16	at Green Bay Packers	**L** 20–53	7–3	Lambeau Field	Recap
12	November 23	Tennessee Titans	**W** 43–24	8–3	Lincoln Financial Field	Recap
13	November 27	at **Dallas Cowboys**	**W** 33–10	9–3	AT&T Stadium	Recap
14	December 7	Seattle Seahawks	**L** 14–24	9–4	Lincoln Financial Field	Recap
15	December 14	**Dallas Cowboys**	**L** 27–38	9–5	Lincoln Financial Field	Recap
16	December 20	at **Washington Redskins**	**L** 24–27	9–6	FedExField	Recap
17	December 28	at **New York Giants**	**W** 34–26	10–6	MetLife Stadium	Recap

Note: Intra-division opponents are in bold text.

=== Game summaries ===
==== Week 1: vs. Jacksonville Jaguars ====
Week One: Jacksonville Jaguars at Philadelphia Eagles – Game summary

Quarter	1	2	3	4	Total
Jaguars	14	3	0	0	**17**
**Eagles**	0	0	14	20	**34**

at Lincoln Financial Field, Philadelphia, Pennsylvania

- Date: September 7
- Game time: 1:00 p.m. EDT
- Game weather: 79 °F (26 °C), (Sunny)
- Game attendance: 69,596
- Referee: Jeff Triplette
- TV announcers (CBS): Andrew Catalon, Steve Beuerlein and Steve Tasker
- Recap, Gamebook

Game information

**First quarter**

- JAX – 9:00 Allen Hurns 34-yard TD pass from Chad Henne, Josh Scobee kick. Drive: 4 plays, 44 yards, 1:58. (JAX 7–0)
- JAX – 6:50 Allen Hurns 21-yard TD pass from Chad Henne, Josh Scobee kick. Drive: 2 plays, 21 yards, 0:10. (JAX 14–0)

**Second quarter**

- JAX – 14:14 Josh Scobee 49-yard FG. Drive: 7 plays, 68 yards, 2:13. (JAX 17–0)

**Third quarter**

- PHI – 11:44 Darren Sproles 49-yard run, Cody Parkey kick. Drive: 10 plays, 80 yards, 3:16. (JAX 17–7)
- PHI – 7:19 Zach Ertz 25-yard TD pass from Nick Foles, Cody Parkey kick. Drive: 6 plays, 40 yards, 2:10. (JAX 17–14)

**Fourth quarter**

- PHI – 10:55 Cody Parkey 51-yard FG. Drive: 12 plays, 55 yards, 4:10. (Tie 17–17)
- PHI – 6:59 Jeremy Maclin 68-yard TD pass from Nick Foles, Cody Parkey kick. Drive: 1 plays, 68 yards, 0:11. (PHI 24–17)
- PHI – 1:57 Cody Parkey 28-yard FG. Drive: 7 plays, 20 yards, 3:59. (PHI 27–17)
- PHI – 1:23 Fletcher Cox 17-yard fumble return, Cody Parkey kick. (PHI 34–17)

**Top passers**

- JAX – Chad Henne: 24/43, 266 yards, 2 TD, 1 lost fumble
- PHI – Nick Foles: 27/45, 322 yards, 2 TD, 1 INT, 2 lost fumbles

**Top rushers**

- JAX – Toby Gerhart: 18 rushes, 42 yards
- PHI – LeSean McCoy: 21 rushes, 74 yards

**Top receivers**

- JAX – Allen Hurns: 4 receptions, 110 yards, 2 TDs
- PHI – Jeremy Maclin: 4 receptions, 97 yards, 1 TD

**Top tacklers**

- JAX – Paul Posluszny: 11 tackles, 1 assist
- PHI – Mychal Kendricks and Fletcher Cox: 6 tackles each

The Eagles started their season at home against the Jacksonville Jaguars. The Jaguars dominated the first half 17–0 with quarterback Chad Henne throwing two touchdown passes to rookie wide receiver, Allen Hurns. The Jaguars defense forced two fumbles on quarterback Nick Foles . In the second quarter after a Josh Scobee 49-yard field goal, Foles threw an interception in the end zone to Alan Ball. The ensuing drive led to a Scobee field goal that was blocked by the Eagles. The Eagles scored on their opening drive in the second half after veteran running back, Darren Sproles rushed 49 yards for a touchdown in his first game as an Eagle. Then, Foles threw a 25-yard touchdown pass to Tight End, Zach Ertz on the next Eagles drive. Then on the first Eagles drive in the fourth quarter, Cody Parkey kicked a 51-yard field goal to tie the game up at 17. Then on the first play of the next Eagles drive, Foles threw a 68-yard touchdown pass to a wide open Jeremy Maclin to give the Eagles the first lead of the game, 24–17. Then, after stopping the Jaguars on fourth down, the Eagles marched down the field which led to a Parkey 28-yard field goal, bringing the lead to 27–17. On the next Jaguars drive, Trent Cole forced Chad Henne to fumble and Fletcher Cox picked it up and returned it for a touchdown. The Eagles won the game 34–17. With the win, the Eagles were 1–0.

==== Week 2: at Indianapolis Colts ====
Week Two: Philadelphia Eagles at Indianapolis Colts – Game summary

Quarter	1	2	3	4	Total
**Eagles**	3	3	14	10	**30**
Colts	7	10	3	7	**27**

at Lucas Oil Stadium, Indianapolis, Indiana

- Date: September 15
- Game time: 8:30 pm. EDT
- Game weather: Played indoors (retractable roof closed)
- Game attendance: 64,871
- Referee: Terry McAulay
- TV announcers (ESPN): Mike Tirico, Jon Gruden and Lisa Salters
- Recap, Gamebook

Game information

**First quarter**

- PHI - 9:52 Cody Parkey 31-yard FG (PHI 3-0)
- IND - 5:22 Ahmad Bradshaw 1-yard TD pass from Andrew Luck, Adam Vinatieri kick (IND 7-3)

**Second quarter**

- IND - 13:23 Adam Vinatieri 46-yard FG (IND 10-3)
- PHI - 6:39 Cody Parkey 23-yard FG (IND 10-6)
- IND - 1:20 Jack Doyle 2-yard TD pass from Andrew Luck, Adam Vinatieri kick (IND 17-6)

**Third quarter**

- IND - 6:47 Adam Vinatieri 27-yard FG (IND 20-6)
- PHI - 4:42 LeSean McCoy 1-yard TD run, Cody Parkey kick (IND 20-13)
- PHI - 2:52 Darren Sproles 19-yard TD run, Cody Parkey kick (Tie 20-20)

**Fourth quarter**

- IND - 11:54 Ahmad Bradshaw 7-yard TD pass from Andrew Luck, Adam Vinatieri kick (IND 27-20)
- PHI - 3:30 Jeremy Maclin 6-yard TD pass from Nick Foles, Cody Parkey kick (Tie 27-27)
- PHI - 0:00 Cody Parkey 36-yard FG (PHI 30-27)

**Top passers**

- PHI – Nick Foles: 21/37, 331 yards, 1 TD, 1 INT
- IND – Andrew Luck: 20/34, 172 yards, 3 TD, 1 INT

**Top rushers**

- PHI – LeSean McCoy: 20 rushes, 79 yards, 1 TD
- IND – Trent Richardson: 21 rushes, 79 yards

**Top receivers**

- PHI – Darren Sproles: 7 receptions, 152 yards
- IND – T. Y. Hilton: 6 receptions, 65 yards

**Top tacklers**

- PHI – DeMeco Ryans: 7 tackles, 3 assists
- IND – Mike Adams: 8 tackles

==== Week 3: vs. Washington Redskins ====
Week Three: Washington Redskins at Philadelphia Eagles – Game summary

Quarter	1	2	3	4	Total
Redskins	14	6	7	7	**34**
**Eagles**	7	14	6	10	**37**

at Lincoln Financial Field, Philadelphia, Pennsylvania

- Date: September 21
- Game time: 1:00 pm. EDT
- Game weather: 78 °F (26 °C), (Sunny)
- Game attendance: 69,596
- Referee: Tony Corrente
- TV announcers (Fox): Joe Buck, Troy Aikman and Erin Andrews
- Recap, Gamebook

Game information

**First quarter**

- WAS - 8:47 Darrel Young 4-yard TD pass from Kirk Cousins, Kai Forbath kick good (WAS 7-0)
- PHI - 8:29 Chris Polk 102-yard kick return for a TD, Cody Parkey kick good (Tie 7-7)
- WAS - 2:13 Pierre Garçon 4-yard TD pass from Kirk Cousins, Kai Forbath kick good (WAS 14-7)

**Second quarter**

- WAS - 8:54 Kai Forbath 49-yard FG (WAS 17-7)
- PHI - 5:52 Jordan Matthews 11-yard TD pass from Nick Foles, Cody Parkey kick good (WAS 17-14)
- WAS - 1:19 Kai Forbath 44-yard FG (WAS 20-14)
- PHI - 0:13 Jordan Matthews 11-yard TD pass from Nick Foles, Cody Parkey kick good (PHI 21-20)

**Third quarter**

- PHI - 12:07 Cody Parkey 38-yard FG (PHI 24-20)
- PHI - 8:07 Cody Parkey 33-yard FG (PHI 27-20)
- WAS - 2:13 DeSean Jackson 81-yard TD pass from Kirk Cousins, Kai Forbath kick good (Tie 27-27)

**Fourth quarter**

- PHI - 7:39 Jeremy Maclin 27-yard TD pass from Nick Foles, Cody Parkey kick good (PHI 34-27)
- PHI - 6:00 Cody Parkey 51-yard FG (PHI 37-27)
- WAS - 4:19 Roy Helu 1-yard TD run, Kai Forbath kick good (PHI 37-34)

**Top passers**

- WAS – Kirk Cousins: 30/48, 427 yards, 3 TD, 1 INT
- PHI – Nick Foles: 27/41, 325 yards, 3 TD

**Top rushers**

- WAS – Alfred Morris: 23 rushes, 77 yards
- PHI – LeSean McCoy: 19 rushes, 22 yards

**Top receivers**

- WAS – Pierre Garçon: 11 receptions, 138 yards, 1 TD
- PHI – Jeremy Maclin: 8 receptions, 154 yards, 1 TD

**Top tacklers**

- WAS – Brandon Meriweather: 5 tackles, 1 assist
- PHI – Bradley Fletcher: 9 tackles

This was DeSean Jackson's first game against his former team. The Eagles improved to 3–0 with this win.

==== Week 4: at San Francisco 49ers ====
Week Four: Philadelphia Eagles at San Francisco 49ers – Game summary

Quarter	1	2	3	4	Total
Eagles	7	14	0	0	**21**
**49ers**	3	10	10	3	**26**

at Levi's Stadium, Santa Clara, California

- Date: September 28
- Game time: 4:25 pm. EDT/1:25 p.m. PDT
- Game weather: 72 °F (22 °C), sunny
- Game attendance: 70,799
- Referee: Ed Hochuli
- TV announcers (Fox): Joe Buck, Troy Aikman and Erin Andrews
- Recap, Gamebook

Game information

**First quarter**

- PHI - 12:19 Andy Lee punt blocked and returned 0 yards by Brad Smith for a TD, Cody Parkey kick good (PHI 7-0)
- SF - 3:32 Phil Dawson 29-yard FG (PHI 7-3)

**Second quarter**

- SF - 14:45 Frank Gore 55-yard TD pass from Colin Kaepernick, Phil Dawson kick good (SF 10-7)
- PHI - 12:02 Malcolm Jenkins 53-yard interception return for a TD, Cody Parkey kick good (PHI 14-10)
- PHI - 8:49 Darren Sproles 82-yard punt return for a TD, Cody Parkey kick good (PHI 21-10)
- SF - 0:59 Phil Dawson 51-yard FG (PHI 21-13)

**Third quarter**

- SF - 8:06 Stevie Johnson 12-yard TD pass from Colin Kaepernick, Phil Dawson kick good (PHI 21-20)
- SF - 3:33 Phil Dawson 46-yard FG (SF 23-21)

**Fourth quarter**

- SF - 6:35 Phil Dawson 31-yard FG (SF 26-21)

**Top passers**

- PHI – Nick Foles: 21/43, 195 yards, 2 INTs
- SF – Colin Kaepernick: 17/30, 218 yards, 2 TDs, 1 INT

**Top rushers**

- PHI – LeSean McCoy: 10 rushes, 17 yards
- SF – Frank Gore: 24 rushes, 119 yards

**Top receivers**

- PHI – Jeremy Maclin: 4 receptions, 57 yards
- SF – Anquan Boldin: 5 receptions, 62 yards

**Top tacklers**

- PHI – DeMeco Ryans: 7 tackles
- SF – Antoine Bethea: 7 tackles

==== Week 5: vs. St. Louis Rams ====
Week Five: St. Louis Rams at Philadelphia Eagles – Game summary

Quarter	1	2	3	4	Total
Rams	0	7	7	14	**28**
**Eagles**	13	7	14	0	**34**

at Lincoln Financial Field, Philadelphia, Pennsylvania

- Date: October 5
- Game time: 1:00 pm. EDT
- Game weather: 59 °F (15 °C), mostly sunny
- Game attendance: 69,596
- Referee: Bill Vinovich
- TV announcers (Fox): Kenny Albert, Daryl Johnston and Tony Siragusa
- Recap, Gamebook

Game information

**First quarter**

- PHI - 14:44 Johnny Hekker punt blocked and returned 10 yards by Chris Maragos for a TD, Cody Parkey kick good (PHI 7-0)
- PHI - 7:45 Cody Parkey 26-yard FG (PHI 10-0)
- PHI - 3:07 Cody Parkey 27-yard FG (PHI 13-0)

**Second quarter**

- STL - 3:32 Brian Quick 8-yard TD pass from Austin Davis, Greg Zuerlein kick good (PHI 13-7)
- PHI - 0:34 Riley Cooper 9-yard TD pass from Nick Foles, Cody Parkey kick good (PHI 20-7)

**Third quarter**

- PHI - 12:25 Cedric Thornton 5-yard fumble recovery for a TD, Cody Parkey kick good (PHI 27-7)
- PHI - 2:20 Jeremy Maclin 24-yard TD pass from Nick Foles, Cody Parkey kick good (PHI 34-7)
- STL - 0:08 Benny Cunningham 14-yard TD run, Greg Zuerlein kick good (PHI 34-14)

**Fourth quarter**

- STL - 9:10 Kenny Britt 30-yard TD pass from Austin Davis, Greg Zuerlein kick good (PHI 34-21)
- STL - 4:44 Brian Quick 5-yard TD pass from Austin Davis, Greg Zuerlein kick good (PHI 34-28)

**Top passers**

- STL – Austin Davis: 29/49, 375 yards, 3 TDs, 1 lost fumble
- PHI – Nick Foles: 24/37, 207 yards, 2 TDs, 1 INT

**Top rushers**

- STL – Benny Cunningham: 7 rushes, 47 yards, 1 TD
- PHI – LeSean McCoy: 24 rushes, 81 yards, 1 lost fumble

**Top receivers**

- STL – Brian Quick: 5 receptions, 87 yards, 2 TDs
- PHI – Jeremy Maclin: 5 receptions, 76 yards, 1 TD

**Top tacklers**

- STL – T. J. McDonald: 10 tackles, 1 assist
- PHI – DeMeco Ryans: 7 tackles, 1 assist

==== Week 6: vs. New York Giants ====
Week Six: New York Giants at Philadelphia Eagles – Game summary

Quarter	1	2	3	4	Total
Giants	0	0	0	0	**0**
**Eagles**	10	10	7	0	**27**

at Lincoln Financial Field, Philadelphia, Pennsylvania

- Date: October 12
- Game time: 8:30 pm. EDT
- Game weather: 54 °F (12 °C), (Clear)
- Game attendance: 69,596
- Referee: Clete Blakeman
- TV announcers (NBC): Al Michaels, Cris Collinsworth and Michele Tafoya
- Recap, Gamebook

Game information

**First quarter**

- PHI - 10:55 Cody Parkey 31-yard FG (PHI 3-0)
- PHI - 3:56 Zach Ertz 15-yard TD pass from Nick Foles, Cody Parkey kick (PHI 10-0)

**Second quarter**

- PHI - 9:10 James Casey 26-yard TD pass from Nick Foles, Cody Parkey kick (PHI 17-0)
- PHI - 4:25 Cody Parkey 45-yard FG (PHI 20-0)

**Third quarter**

- PHI - 5:26 Darren Sproles 15-yard TD run, Cody Parkey kick (PHI 27-0)

**Fourth quarter**

- No scoring plays

**Top passers**

- NYG – Eli Manning: 13/23, 151 yards
- PHI – Nick Foles: 21/34, 248 yards, 2 TDs, 2 INTs

**Top rushers**

- NYG – Andre Williams: 16 rushes, 58 yards
- PHI – LeSean McCoy: 22 rushes, 149 yards

**Top receivers**

- NYG – Rueben Randle: 5 receptions, 58 yards
- PHI – Riley Cooper: 5 receptions, 59 yards

**Top tacklers**

- NYG – Quintin Demps: 9 tackles, 1 assist
- PHI – Nate Allen: 5 tackles, 1 assist

This marked the first time the Eagles had shut out an opponent since they did so also against the Giants in 1996. Darren Sproles tore his MCL during the game. The Eagles also introduced their blackout uniform in this game.

==== Week 8: at Arizona Cardinals ====
Week Eight: Philadelphia Eagles at Arizona Cardinals – Game summary

Quarter	1	2	3	4	Total
Eagles	7	0	10	3	**20**
**Cardinals**	0	7	7	10	**24**

at University of Phoenix Stadium, Glendale, Arizona

- Date: October 26
- Game time: 4:05 pm. EDT/1:05 pm. Arizona time
- Game weather: Played indoors (retractable roof closed)
- Game attendance: 61,789
- Referee: Walt Anderson
- TV announcers (Fox): Chris Myers, Ronde Barber and Jennifer Hale
- Recap, Gamebook

Game information

**First quarter**

- PHI - 4:39 Jeremy Maclin 21-yard TD pass from Nick Foles, Cody Parkey kick (PHI 7-0)

**Second quarter**

- ARI - 13:45 Andre Ellington 1-yard TD run, Chandler Catanzaro kick (Tie 7-7)

**Third quarter**

- ARI - 14:07 Larry Fitzgerald 80-yard TD pass from Carson Palmer, Chandler Catanzaro kick (ARI 14-7)
- PHI - 7:19 Cody Parkey 54-yard FG (ARI 14-10)
- PHI - 2:22 Jeremy Maclin 54-yard TD pass from Nick Foles, Cody Parkey kick (PHI 17-14)

**Fourth quarter**

- ARI - 9:01 Chandler Catanzaro 28-yard FG (Tie 17-17)
- PHI - 1:56 Cody Parkey 20-yard FG (PHI 20-17)
- ARI - 1:21 John Brown 75-yard TD pass from Carson Palmer, Chandler Catanzaro kick (ARI 24-20)

**Top passers**

- PHI – Nick Foles: 36/61, 411 yards, 2 TDs, 2 INTs
- ARI – Carson Palmer: 20/42, 329 yards, 2 TDs

**Top rushers**

- PHI – LeSean McCoy: 19 rushes, 82 yards
- ARI – Andre Ellington: 23 rushes, 71 yards, 1 TD, 1 lost fumble

**Top receivers**

- PHI – Jeremy Maclin: 12 receptions, 187 yards, 2 TDs
- ARI – Larry Fitzgerald: 7 receptions, 160 yards, 1 TD

**Top tacklers**

- PHI – Malcolm Jenkins: 5 tackles
- ARI – Tony Jefferson: 9 tackles

Carson Palmer lofted a 75-yard touchdown pass to rookie John Brown with 1:21 to play to give the Arizona Cardinals a stunning 24–20 victory over the Philadelphia Eagles in a matchup of two of the NFL's four remaining one-loss teams.

The Cardinals (6–1) had a goal-line stand that forced the Eagles (5–2) to settle for a 20-yard field goal that put Philadelphia up 20–17 with 1:56 left. Then on third-and-five, Palmer - who also had an 80-yard TD pass to Larry Fitzgerald - heaved the ball deep, where the speedy Brown gathered it in and crossed the goal line just as he was being tackled. The Eagles drove to the Arizona 16. On the last play of the game, Jordan Matthews caught a pass from Nick Foles in the end zone but landed out of bounds.

==== Week 9: at Houston Texans ====
Week Nine: Philadelphia Eagles at Houston Texans – Game summary

Quarter	1	2	3	4	Total
**Eagles**	7	10	7	7	**31**
Texans	7	7	0	7	**21**

at NRG Stadium, Houston, Texas

- Date: November 2
- Game time: 1:00 pm. EST/12:00 p.m. CST
- Game weather: Played indoors (retractable roof closed)
- Game attendance: 71,780
- Referee: John Parry
- TV announcers (Fox): Kenny Albert, Daryl Johnston and Tony Siragusa
- Recap, Gamebook

Game information

**First quarter**

- PHI - 8:30 Jeremy Maclin 59-yard TD pass from Nick Foles, Cody Parkey kick good (PHI 7-0)
- HOU - 3:11 A. J. Bouye 51-yard interception return for a TD, Randy Bullock kick good (Tie 7-7)

**Second quarter**

- PHI - 10:41 Jordan Matthews 11-yard TD pass from Mark Sanchez, Cody Parkey kick good (PHI 14-7)
- HOU - 3:58 Arian Foster 56-yard TD pass from Ryan Fitzpatrick, Randy Bullock kick good (Tie 14-14)
- PHI - 0:00 Cody Parkey 45-yard FG (PHI 17-14)

**Third quarter**

- PHI - 2:40 Chris Polk 8-yard TD run, Cody Parkey kick good (PHI 24-14)

**Fourth quarter**

- HOU - 11:51 DeAndre Hopkins 7-yard TD pass from Ryan Fitzpatrick, Randy Bullock kick good (PHI 24-21)
- PHI - 3:50 Jeremy Maclin 8-yard TD pass from Mark Sanchez, Cody Parkey kick good (PHI 31-21)

**Top passers**

- PHI – Mark Sanchez: 15/22, 202 yards, 2 TDs, 2 INTs
- HOU – Ryan Fitzpatrick: 13/27, 203 yards, 2 TDs, 1 INT

**Top rushers**

- PHI – LeSean McCoy: 23 rushes, 117 yards
- HOU – Arian Foster: 15 rushes, 56 yards

**Top receivers**

- PHI – Jeremy Maclin: 6 receptions, 158 yards, 2 TDs
- HOU – DeAndre Hopkins: 6 receptions, 115 yards, 1 TD

**Top tacklers**

- PHI – Mychal Kendricks: 5 tackles, 7 assists
- HOU – Whitney Mercilus: 5 tackles, 4 assists

Mark Sanchez would play for the first time as an Eagle when Nick Foles was injured in the first quarter. Darren Sproles returned from injury.

==== Week 10: vs. Carolina Panthers ====
Week Ten: Carolina Panthers at Philadelphia Eagles – Game summary

Quarter	1	2	3	4	Total
Panthers	7	0	0	14	**21**
**Eagles**	17	14	7	7	**45**

at Lincoln Financial Field, Philadelphia, Pennsylvania

- Date: November 10
- Game time: 8:30 pm. EST
- Game weather: 47 °F (8 °C), (Clear)
- Game attendance: 69,596
- Referee: Gene Steratore
- TV announcers (ESPN): Mike Tirico, Jon Gruden and Lisa Salters
- Recap, Gamebook

Game information

**First quarter**

- PHI - 13:25 Cody Parkey 39-yard FG (PHI 3-0)
- PHI - 11:25 Darren Sproles 8-yard TD run, Cody Parkey kick (PHI 10-0)
- CAR - 6:00 Jonathan Stewart 1-yard TD run, Graham Gano kick (PHI 10-7)
- PHI - 3:29 Darren Sproles 65-yard punt return for a TD, Cody Parkey kick (PHI 17-7)

**Second quarter**

- PHI - 11:33 Jordan Matthews 13-yard TD pass from Mark Sanchez, Cody Parkey kick (PHI 24-7)
- PHI - 2:13 Bradley Fletcher 34-yard interception return for a TD, Cody Parkey kick (PHI 31-7)

**Third quarter**

- PHI - 7:40 LeSean McCoy 1-yard TD run, Cody Parkey kick (PHI 38-7)

**Fourth quarter**

- PHI - 11:43 Jordan Matthews 18-yard TD pass from Mark Sanchez, Cody Parkey kick (PHI 45-7)
- CAR - 9:05 Kelvin Benjamin 21-yard TD pass from Cam Newton, Graham Gano kick (PHI 45-14)
- CAR - 5:30 Kelvin Benjamin 40-yard TD pass from Cam Newton, Graham Gano kick (PHI 45-21)

**Top passers**

- CAR – Cam Newton: 25/40: 306 yards, 2 TDs, 3 INTs
- PHI – Mark Sanchez: 20/37: 332 yards, 2 TDs

**Top rushers**

- CAR – Jonathan Stewart: 11 rushes, 36 yards, 1 TD
- PHI – LeSean McCoy: 12 rushes, 15 yards, 1 TD

**Top receivers**

- CAR – Greg Olsen: 6 receptions, 119 yards
- PHI – Jordan Matthews: 7 receptions, 138 yards, 2 TDs

**Top tacklers**

- CAR – Thomas DeCoud: 8 tackles
- PHI – Mychal Kendricks: 8 tackles

==== Week 11: at Green Bay Packers ====
Week Eleven: Philadelphia Eagles at Green Bay Packers – Game summary

Quarter	1	2	3	4	Total
Eagles	0	6	7	7	**20**
**Packers**	17	13	9	14	**53**

at Lambeau Field, Green Bay, Wisconsin

- Date: November 16
- Game time: 4:25 pm. EST/3:25 pm. CST
- Game weather: 28 °F (−2 °C), cloudy
- Game attendance: 78,270
- Referee: Carl Cheffers
- TV announcers (Fox): Joe Buck, Troy Aikman and Erin Andrews
- Recap, Gamebook

Game information

**First quarter**

- GB - 12:58 Mason Crosby 27-yard FG (GB 3-0)
- GB - 3:33 Davante Adams 6-yard TD pass from Aaron Rodgers, Mason Crosby kick (GB 10-0)
- GB - 2:00 Micah Hyde 70-yard punt return for a TD, Mason Crosby kick (GB 17-0)

**Second quarter**

- PHI - 13:08 Cody Parkey 33-yard FG (GB 17-3)
- GB - 10:39 Jordy Nelson 27-yard TD pass from Aaron Rodgers, Mason Crosby kick (GB 24-3)
- GB - 2:00 Eddie Lacy 1-yard TD run, Mason Crosby kick no good (GB 30-3)
- PHI - 0:00 Cody Parkey 33-yard FG (GB 30-6)

**Third quarter**

- GB - 7:53 Mason Crosby 33-yard FG (GB 33-6)
- GB - 5:56 Julius Peppers 52-yard interception return for a TD, Mason Crosby kick blocked (GB 39-6)
- PHI - 2:21 Jordan Matthews 10-yard TD pass from Mark Sanchez, Cody Parkey kick (GB 39-13)

**Fourth quarter**

- GB - 14:40 Eddie Lacy 32-yard TD pass from Aaron Rodgers, Mason Crosby kick (GB 46-13)
- GB - 10:39 Casey Hayward 49-yard fumble recovery for a TD, Mason Crosby kick (GB 53-13)
- PHI - 7:20 Jeremy Maclin 20-yard TD pass from Mark Sanchez, Cody Parkey kick (GB 53-20)

**Top passers**

- PHI – Mark Sanchez: 26/44, 346 yards, 2 TDs, 2 INTs
- GB – Aaron Rodgers: 22/36, 341 yards, 3 TDs

**Top rushers**

- PHI – LeSean McCoy: 23 rushes, 88 yards
- GB – Eddie Lacy: 10 rushes, 69 yards, 1 TD

**Top receivers**

- PHI – Jordan Matthews: 5 receptions, 107 yards, 1 TD
- GB – Randall Cobb: 10 receptions, 129 yards

**Top tacklers**

- PHI – Cary Williams: 7 tackles
- GB – Morgan Burnett: 7 tackles, 2 assists

The Packers started hot and never looked back, cruising to an easy win over the Eagles, who were tied for the best record in the NFL.

The Packers took the ball and went 75 yards, with the big play being Aaron Rodgers hooking up with Jordy Nelson for 65 yards. However, two incomplete passes forced the Packers to settle for a 27-yard Mason Crosby field goal. After an Eagles punt, the Packers stormed 88 yards in 13 plays, taking 6:47 off the clock, ending with Rodgers connecting with DaVante Adams for a 6-yard touchdown pass. Rodgers continued to show that the Eagles' secondary was no match. The Eagles went three-and-out on their next drive, but this time Micah Hyde returned the punt 75 yards for a touchdown, extending the Packers lead to 17–0 in the first quarter. The Eagles finally managed points on their next drive, going 44 yards in 10 plays before Cody Parkey hit a 33-yard field goal with 13:08 remaining in the half. Unfortunately, for the Eagles, there was no stopping Aaron Rodgers. The Packers advanced 80 yards in only 6 plays, with Rodgers throwing for 60-yard on the drive, including the 27-yard touchdown pass to Jordy Nelson. The Eagles offense continued to sputter, punting on their next possession. The Packers continued their utter domination, moving to the Eagles 19-yard-line, but Malcolm Jenkins was flagged for pass interference in the end zone, moving the ball to the 1 yard-line. Eddie Lacy took it in on the very next play(the Packers two-point conversion attempt was unsuccessful) and the Packers led 30–3 with just 2:00 minutes left in the half. On their next drive, the Eagles managed to move 65 yards and Cody Parkey hit his second field goal of the half, trimming the score to 30–6 at halftime. The Eagles drove into Packer territory on their first possession of the second half, but Mark Sanchez lost a fumble that was recovered by Nick Perry. The Packers punted for the first time all night on their next drive, but the Eagles did nothing, punting themselves. The Packers proceeded to march 48 yards and Crosby was successful from 33 yards away, giving the Packers a 33–6 lead. On the following drive Mark Sanchez continued to give up the ball, with defensive end Julius Peppers returning an interception 52 yards for a touchdown making the score 39-6(Crosby's PAT was blocked). Sanchez drove the Eagles 80 yards, hitting Jordan Matthews 10 yards for a touchdown, closing the gap to 39–13. Rodgers responded by hitting Lacy 32 yards for a touchdown on a screen pass. Sanchez threw his second interception of the night on the next possession, but Crosby missed a field goal. Once again Sanchez turned it over (this time on a fumble), and Casey Hayward returned it 49 yards for a touchdown, making the score a humiliating, 53–13. Sanchez hit Jeremy Maclin for a 20-yard touchdown pass on the next Eagle possession, to close the scoring, giving the Packers a 53–20 blowout victory. The Packers outgained the Eagles 475–429, but four turnovers (all by Sanchez) buried the Eagles.

==== Week 12: vs. Tennessee Titans ====
Week Twelve: Tennessee Titans at Philadelphia Eagles – Game summary

Quarter	1	2	3	4	Total
Titans	0	17	0	7	**24**
**Eagles**	17	10	7	9	**43**

at Lincoln Financial Field, Philadelphia, Pennsylvania

- Date: November 23
- Game time: 1:00 pm. EST
- Game weather: 55 °F (13 °C), (Sunny)
- Game attendance: 69,596
- Referee: Jerome Boger
- TV announcers (CBS): Greg Gumbel, Trent Green and Evan Washburn
- Recap, Gamebook

Game information

**First quarter**

- PHI - 14:47 Josh Huff 107-yard kickoff return for a TD, Cody Parkey kick (PHI 7-0)
- PHI - 10:44 Darren Sproles 4-yard TD run, Cody Parkey kick (PHI 14-0)
- PHI - 3:25 Cody Parkey 36-yard FG (PHI 17-0)

**Second quarter**

- TEN - 14:51 Justin Hunter 40-yard TD pass from Zach Mettenberger, Ryan Succop kick (PHI 17-7)
- PHI - 11:29 Cody Parkey 26-yard FG (PHI 20-7)
- TEN - 8:22 Shonn Greene 2-yard TD run, Ryan Succop kick (PHI 20-14)
- PHI - 4:35 LeSean McCoy 2-yard TD run, Cody Parkey kick (PHI 27-14)
- TEN - 0:51 Ryan Succop 20-yard FG (PHI 27-17)

**Third quarter**

- PHI - 11:27 James Casey 14-yard TD pass from Mark Sanchez, Cody Parkey kick (PHI 34-17)

**Fourth quarter**

- PHI - 14:14 Cody Parkey 35-yard FG (PHI 37-17)
- PHI - 10:22 Cody Parkey 30-yard FG (PHI 40-17)
- TEN - 5:43 Dexter McCluster 6-yard TD pass from Zach Mettenberger, Ryan Succop kick (PHI 40-24)
- PHI - 2:26 Cody Parkey 50-yard FG (PHI 43-24)

**Top passers**

- TEN – Zach Mettenberger: 20/39, 345 yards, 2 TDs, 1 INT
- PHI – Mark Sanchez: 30/43, 307 yards, 1 TD, 2 INTs

**Top rushers**

- TEN – Bishop Sankey: 10 rushes, 37 yards
- PHI – LeSean McCoy: 21 rushes, 130 yards, 1 TD

**Top receivers**

- TEN – Delanie Walker: 5 receptions, 155 yards
- PHI – Jordan Matthews: 6 receptions, 77 yards

**Top tacklers**

- TEN – Michael Griffin: 11 tackles, 1 assist
- PHI – Mychal Kendricks: 7 tackles

This win marked the Eagles' first ever win against the Tennessee Titans, since they changed their name and city from the Houston Oilers. Also Josh Huff scored a 107-yard Touchdown on the opening kickoff

==== Week 13: at Dallas Cowboys ====
Thanksgiving Day game

Week Thirteen: Philadelphia Eagles at Dallas Cowboys – Game summary

Quarter	1	2	3	4	Total
**Eagles**	14	9	7	3	**33**
Cowboys	0	7	3	0	**10**

at AT&T Stadium, Arlington, Texas

- Date: November 27
- Game time: 4:30 pm. EST/3:30 pm. CST
- Game weather: Played indoors (retractable roof closed)
- Game attendance: 91,379
- Referee: Clete Blakeman
- TV announcers (Fox): Joe Buck, Troy Aikman and Erin Andrews
- Recap, Gamebook

Game information

**First quarter**

- PHI - 11:55 Mark Sanchez 2-yard TD run, Cody Parkey kick (PHI 7-0)
- PHI - 4:08 Jordan Matthews 27-yard TD pass from Mark Sanchez, Cody Parkey kick (PHI 14-0)

**Second quarter**

- DAL - 14:56 DeMarco Murray 1-yard TD run, Dan Bailey kick (PHI 14-7)
- PHI - 12:10 Cody Parkey 31-yard FG (PHI 17-7)
- PHI - 1:35 Cody Parkey 22-yard FG (PHI 20-7)
- PHI - 0:21 Cody Parkey 26-yard FG (PHI 23-7)

**Third quarter**

- DAL - 9:12 Dan Bailey 28-yard FG (PHI 23-10)
- PHI - 7:20 LeSean McCoy 38-yard TD run, Cody Parkey kick (PHI 30-10)

**Fourth quarter**

- PHI - 11:01 Cody Parkey 25-yard FG (PHI 33-10)

**Top passers**

- PHI – Mark Sanchez: 20/29, 217 yards, 1 TD
- DAL – Tony Romo: 18/29, 199 yards, 2 INTs

**Top rushers**

- PHI – LeSean McCoy: 25 rushes, 159 yards, 1 TD
- DAL – DeMarco Murray: 20 rushes, 73 yards, 1 TD

**Top receivers**

- PHI – Jeremy Maclin: 8 receptions, 108 yards
- DAL – Dez Bryant: 4 receptions, 73 yards

**Top tacklers**

- PHI – Mychal Kendricks: 6 tackles, 1 assist
- DAL – Anthony Hitchens: 10 tackles, 2 assists

With this win, the Eagles were not only the sole leaders of their division, but at 9–3, they tied the Broncos, Patriots, Cardinals, and Packers for the best record in the entire NFL.

==== Week 14: vs. Seattle Seahawks ====
Week Fourteen: Seattle Seahawks at Philadelphia Eagles – Game summary

Quarter	1	2	3	4	Total
**Seahawks**	0	10	14	0	**24**
Eagles	7	0	7	0	**14**

at Lincoln Financial Field, Philadelphia, Pennsylvania

- Date: December 7
- Game time: 4:25 pm. EST
- Game weather: 38 °F (3 °C), (Sunny)
- Game attendance: 69,596
- Referee: Bill Vinovich
- TV announcers (Fox): Joe Buck, Troy Aikman and Erin Andrews
- Recap, Gamebook

Game information

**First quarter**

- PHI - 3:37 Jeremy Maclin 1-yard TD pass from Mark Sanchez, Cody Parkey kick good (PHI 7-0)

**Second quarter**

- SEA - 14:17 Russell Wilson 26-yard TD run, Steven Hauschka kick good (Tie 7-7)
- SEA - 0:02 Steven Hauschka 44-yard FG (SEA 10-7)

**Third quarter**

- SEA - 14:03 Marshawn Lynch 15-yard TD pass from Russell Wlison, Steven Hauschka kick good (SEA 17-7)
- PHI - 12:09 Zach Ertz 35-yard TD pass from Mark Sanchez, Cody Parkey kick good (SEA 17-14)

**Fourth quarter**

- SEA - 9:01 Doug Baldwin 23-yard TD pass from Russell Wilson, Steven Hauschka kick good (SEA 24-14)

**Top passers**

- SEA – Russell Wilson: 23/37, 263 yards, 2 TD
- PHI – Mark Sanchez: 10/20, 96 yards, 2 TD, 1 INT

**Top rushers**

- SEA – Marshawn Lynch: 23 rushes, 86 yards
- PHI – LeSean McCoy: 17 rushes, 50 yards

**Top receivers**

- SEA – Doug Baldwin: 5 receptions, 97 yards, 1 TD
- PHI – Zach Ertz: 2 receptions, 39 yards, 1 TD

**Top tacklers**

- SEA – Bobby Wagner: 7 tackles
- PHI – Fletcher Cox: 8 tackles, 3 assists

The Eagles wore their blackout uniform in this game.

==== Week 15: vs. Dallas Cowboys ====
Week Fifteen: Dallas Cowboys at Philadelphia Eagles – Game summary

Quarter	1	2	3	4	Total
**Cowboys**	14	7	7	10	**38**
Eagles	0	10	14	3	**27**

at Lincoln Financial Field, Philadelphia, Pennsylvania

- Date: December 14
- Game time: 8:30 pm. EST
- Game weather: 44 °F (7 °C), (Cloudy)
- Game attendance: 69,596
- Referee: Terry McAulay
- TV announcers (NBC): Al Michaels, Cris Collinsworth and Michele Tafoya
- Recap, Gamebook

Game information

**First quarter**

- DAL - 12:46 DeMarco Murray 1-yard TD run, Dan Bailey kick good (DAL 7-0)
- DAL - 3:04 Dez Bryant 4-yard TD pass from Tony Romo, Dan Bailey kick good (DAL 14-0)

**Second quarter**

- DAL - 11:56 Dez Bryant 26-yard TD pass from Tony Romo, Dan Bailey kick good (DAL 21-0)
- PHI - 8:32 Chris Polk 5-yard TD run, Cody Parkey kick good (DAL 21-7)
- PHI - 1:48 Cody Parkey 47-yard FG (DAL 21-10)

**Third quarter**

- PHI - 8:48 Chris Polk 1-yard TD run, Cody Parkey kick good (DAL 21-17)
- PHI - 5:42 Darren Sproles 1-yard TD run, Cody Parkey kick good (PHI 24-21)
- DAL - 0:39 DeMarco Murray 2-yard TD run, Dan Bailey kick good (DAL 28-24)

**Fourth quarter**

- DAL - 12:48 Dez Bryant 25-yard TD pass from Tony Romo, Dan Bailey kick good (DAL 35-24)
- PHI - 10:45 Cody Parkey 43-yard FG (DAL 35-27)
- DAL - 4:37 Dan Bailey 49-yard FG (DAL 38-27)

**Top passers**

- DAL – Tony Romo: 22/31, 265 yards, 3 TD
- PHI – Mark Sanchez: 17/28, 252 yards, 2 INT

**Top rushers**

- DAL – DeMarco Murray: 31 rushes, 81 yards, 2 TD
- PHI – LeSean McCoy: 16 rushes, 64 yards

**Top receivers**

- DAL – Dez Bryant: 6 receptions, 114 yards, 3 TD
- PHI – Jeremy Maclin: 4 receptions, 98 yards

**Top tacklers**

- DAL – Barry Church: 6 tackles
- PHI – Malcolm Jenkins: 7 tackles

==== Week 16: at Washington Redskins ====
Week Sixteen: Philadelphia Eagles at Washington Redskins – Game summary

Quarter	1	2	3	4	Total
Eagles	7	7	0	10	**24**
**Redskins**	10	0	14	3	**27**

at FedExField, Landover, Maryland

- Date: December 20
- Game time: 4:30 pm. EST
- Game weather: 37 °F (3 °C), cloudy
- Game attendance: 78,897
- Referee: Carl Cheffers
- TV announcers (NFLN): Kevin Harlan, Rich Gannon and Stacey Dales
- Recap, Gamebook

Game information

**First quarter**

- WAS - 6:04 Kai Forbath 25-yard FG (WAS 3-0)
- PHI - 1:49 LeSean McCoy 11-yard TD run, Cody Parkey kick good (PHI 7-3)
- WAS - 0:19 Alfred Morris 28-yard TD run, Kai Forbath kick good (WAS 10-7)

**Second quarter**

- PHI - 3:39 Riley Cooper 3-yard TD pass from Mark Sanchez, Cody Parkey kick good (PHI 14-10)

**Third quarter**

- WAS - 6:46 Darrel Young 1-yard TD run, Kai Forbath kick good (WAS 17-14)
- WAS - 0:26 Darrel Young 1-yard TD run, Kai Forbath kick good (WAS 24-14)

**Fourth quarter**

- PHI - 10:33 Riley Cooper 16-yard TD pass from Mark Sanchez, Cody Parkey kick good (WAS 24-21)
- PHI - 6:17 Codey Parkey 22-yard FG (Tie 24-24)
- WAS - 0:05 Kai Forbath 26-yard FG (WAS 27-24)

**Top passers**

- PHI – Mark Sanchez: 37/50, 374 yards, 2 TD, 1 INT
- WAS – Robert Griffin III: 16/23, 220 yards, 1 INT

**Top rushers**

- PHI – LeSean McCoy: 22 rushes, 88 yards, 1 TD
- WAS – Alfred Morris: 21 rushes, 83 yards

**Top receivers**

- PHI – Zach Ertz: 15 receptions, 115 yards
- WAS – DeSean Jackson: 4 receptions, 126 yards

**Top tacklers**

- PHI – Mychal Kendricks: 7 tackles, 3 assists
- WAS – Ryan Clark: 13 tackles, 2 assists

Even though the Redskins were 3–11 and had a 6-game losing streak, the Eagles lost to their divisional rivals due to a 4th quarter interception by Mark Sanchez. With the loss, the Eagles fell to 9–6, and were officially eliminated from postseason contention for the first time since 2012, after the Cowboys defeated the Colts the following Sunday.

==== Week 17: at New York Giants ====
Week Seventeen: Philadelphia Eagles at New York Giants – Game summary

Quarter	1	2	3	4	Total
**Eagles**	14	3	7	10	**34**
Giants	10	6	3	7	**26**

at MetLife Stadium, East Rutherford, New Jersey

- Date: December 28
- Game time: 1:00 pm. EST
- Game weather: 48 °F (9 °C), cloudy
- Game attendance: 79,150
- Referee: Walt Coleman
- TV announcers (Fox): Kenny Albert, Daryl Johnston and Tony Siragusa
- Recap, Gamebook

Game information

**First quarter**

- NYG - 12:11 Andre Williams 1-yard TD run, Josh Brown kick good (NYG 7-0)
- PHI - 11:00 Jordan Matthews 44-yard TD pass from Mark Sanchez, Cody Parkey kick good (Tie 7-7)
- PHI - 6:12 Brent Celek 1-yard TD pass from Mark Sanchez, Cody Parkey kick good (PHI 14-7)
- NYG - 2:11 Josh Brown 38-yard FG (PHI 14-10)

**Second quarter**

- NYG - 7:26 Josh Brown 20-yard FG (PHI 14-13)
- NYG - 2:02 Josh Brown 36-yard FG (NYG 16-14)
- PHI - 0:00 Cody Parkey 32-yard FG (PHI 17-16)

**Third quarter**

- PHI - 12:21 Steve Weatherford punt blocked and returned 27 yards by Trey Burton for a TD, Cody Parkey kick good (PHI 24-16)
- NYG - 4:24 Josh Brown 53-yard FG (PHI 24-19)

**Fourth quarter**

- PHI - 13:08 Chris Polk 1-yard TD run, Cody Parkey kick good (PHI 31-19)
- NYG - 11:47 Odell Beckham Jr. 63-yard TD pass from Eli Manning, Josh Brown kick good (PHI 31-26)
- PHI - 7:56 Cody Parkey 39-yard FG (PHI 34-26)

**Top passers**

- PHI – Mark Sanchez: 23/36, 292 yards, 2 TD, 1 INT
- NYG – Eli Manning: 28/53, 429 yards, 1 TD, 1 INT

**Top rushers**

- PHI – LeSean McCoy: 17 rushes, 99 yards
- NYG – Andre Williams: 15 rushes, 43 yards, 1 TD

**Top receivers**

- PHI – Jordan Matthews: 8 receptions, 105 yards, 1 TD
- NYG – Odell Beckham Jr.: 12 receptions, 185 yards, 1 TD

**Top tacklers**

- PHI – Malcolm Jenkins: 7 tackles, 1 assist
- NYG – Mike Harris: 10 tackles

With the win, the Eagles finished their season 10–6 and barely missed out on the playoffs. The team also swept the Giants for the first time since 2010.

== Standings ==
=== Division ===
NFC East
	W	L	T	PCT	DIV	CONF	PF	PA	STK
^{(3)} Dallas Cowboys	12	4	0	.750	4–2	8–4	467	352	W4
Philadelphia Eagles	10	6	0	.625	4–2	6–6	474	400	W1
New York Giants	6	10	0	.375	2–4	4–8	380	400	L1
Washington Redskins	4	12	0	.250	2–4	2–10	301	438	L1

=== Conference ===
NFC
#	Team	Division	W	L	T	PCT	DIV	CONF	SOS	SOV	STK
Division leaders
1 (Note: Seattle, Green Bay and Dallas were ranked in seeds 1–3 based on conference record.)	Seattle Seahawks	West	12	4	0	.750	5–1	10–2	.525	.513	W6
2	Green Bay Packers	North	12	4	0	.750	5–1	9–3	.482	.440	W2
3	Dallas Cowboys	East	12	4	0	.750	4–2	8–4	.445	.422	W4
4	Carolina Panthers	South	7	8	1	.469	4–2	6–6	.490	.357	W4
Wild Cards
5 (Note: Arizona defeated Detroit head-to-head (Week 11, 14–6).)	Arizona Cardinals	West	11	5	0	.688	3–3	8–4	.523	.477	L2
6	Detroit Lions	North	11	5	0	.688	5–1	9–3	.471	.392	L1
Did not qualify for the postseason
7	Philadelphia Eagles	East	10	6	0	.625	4–2	6–6	.490	.416	W1
8	San Francisco 49ers	West	8	8	0	.500	2–4	7–5	.527	.508	W1
9 (Note: New Orleans defeated Minnesota head-to-head (Week 3, 20–9).)	New Orleans Saints	South	7	9	0	.438	3–3	6–6	.486	.415	W1
10	Minnesota Vikings	North	7	9	0	.438	1–5	6–6	.475	.308	W1
11 (Note: The NY Giants defeated both Atlanta and St. Louis head-to-head (Atlanta: Week 5, 30–20; St. Louis: Week 16, 37–27), while Atlanta finished ahead of St. Louis based on conference record.)	New York Giants	East	6	10	0	.375	2–4	4–8	.512	.323	L1
12	Atlanta Falcons	South	6	10	0	.375	5–1	6–6	.482	.380	L1
13	St. Louis Rams	West	6	10	0	.375	2–4	4–8	.531	.427	L3
14	Chicago Bears	North	5	11	0	.313	1–5	4–8	.529	.338	L5
15	Washington Redskins	East	4	12	0	.250	2–4	2–10	.496	.422	L1
16	Tampa Bay Buccaneers	South	2	14	0	.125	0–6	1–11	.486	.469	L6
Tiebreakers (Note: When breaking ties for three or more teams under the NFL's rules, they are first broken within divisions, then comparing only the highest-ranked remaining team from each division.)
