= Palmyra High School =

Palmyra High School may refer to:

- Palmyra High School, in Palmyra, Illinois
- Palmyra High School (Missouri), Marion County, Missouri
- Junior-Senior High School at Palmyra, a high school in Otoe County, Nebraska
- Palmyra High School (New Jersey), Palmyra, New Jersey
- Palmyra-Macedon High School, Palmyra, New York
- Palmyra Area High School, Palmyra, Pennsylvania
- Palmyra-Eagle High School, a high school in Palmyra, Wisconsin

== See also ==
- Palmyra (disambiguation)
