= Palmira (name) =

Palmira is a feminine given name. Notable people with the name are as follows:

- Palmira Barbosa (born 1961), Angolan Olympic athlete
- Palmira Bastos (1875–1967), Portuguese stage actor
- Palmira Brummett, American historian
- Palmira Pedro Francisco, Mozambican politician and sports official
- Palmira Jaquetti i Isant (1895–1963), Spanish folklorist and poet
- Palmira Maciel (born 1961), Portuguese politician
- Palmira Marçal (born 1984), Brazilian basketball player
- Palmira Omiccioli, known as Eleonora Rossi Drago (1925–2007), Italian film actress
- Palmira N. Ríos (born 1956), Afro-Puerto Rican academic
- Palmira Silva (died 2014), Italian woman who was beheaded in London

== Fictional characters ==
- Palmira, one of the major characters in Voltaire's play Mahomet

== See also ==
- Palmira (disambiguation), related disambiguation page
