= Palmyra offensive =

Palmyra offensive may refer to:

- Palmyra offensive (May 2015), a military operation launched during the Syrian Civil War by the Islamic State of Iraq and the Levant (ISIL)
- Palmyra offensive (July–August 2015), an operation by the Syrian Arab Army to recapture the area lost in the previous offensive, ended with limited achievements
- Palmyra offensive (March 2016), an operation by the Syrian Arab Army to recapture the city of Palmyra, which was previously lost to the Islamic State of Iraq and the Levant
- Palmyra offensive (December 2016), a military operation launched during the Syrian Civil War by the Islamic State of Iraq and the Levant (ISIL)
- Palmyra offensive (2017), a military operation launched by the Syrian Arab Army and its allies to recapture Palmyra from ISIL
- Palmyra offensive (2024), An attack by the United States-backed Syrian Free Army as part of the Syrian opposition offensive in 2024

== See also ==
- Battle of Palmyra (disambiguation)
- Palmyra (disambiguation)
