= Battle of Palmyra =

Battle of Palmyra may refer to:

- Battle of Palmyra (1941), a World War II battle in which the United Kingdom captured Palmyra from Vichy France.
- Palmyra offensive (May 2015), a Syrian Civil War battle in which the Islamic State captured Palmyra from the Syrian Government.
- Palmyra offensive (July–August 2015), a Syrian Civil War battle in which the Syrian government unsuccessfully attempted to capture Palmyra from the Islamic State.
- Palmyra offensive (March 2016), a Syrian Civil War battle in which the Syrian government recaptured Palmyra from the Islamic State.
- Palmyra offensive (December 2016), a Syrian Civil War battle in which the Islamic State recaptured Palmyra from the Syrian Government.
- Palmyra offensive (2017), a Syrian Civil War battle in which the Syrian Government recaptured Palmyra from the Islamic State a second time.
- Palmyra offensive (2024), Syrian Free Army takes over Palmyra, Syria in 2024

== See also ==
- Palmyra offensive
- Palmyra (disambiguation)
