= Clarence B. Jones =

American lawyer (1931–2026)

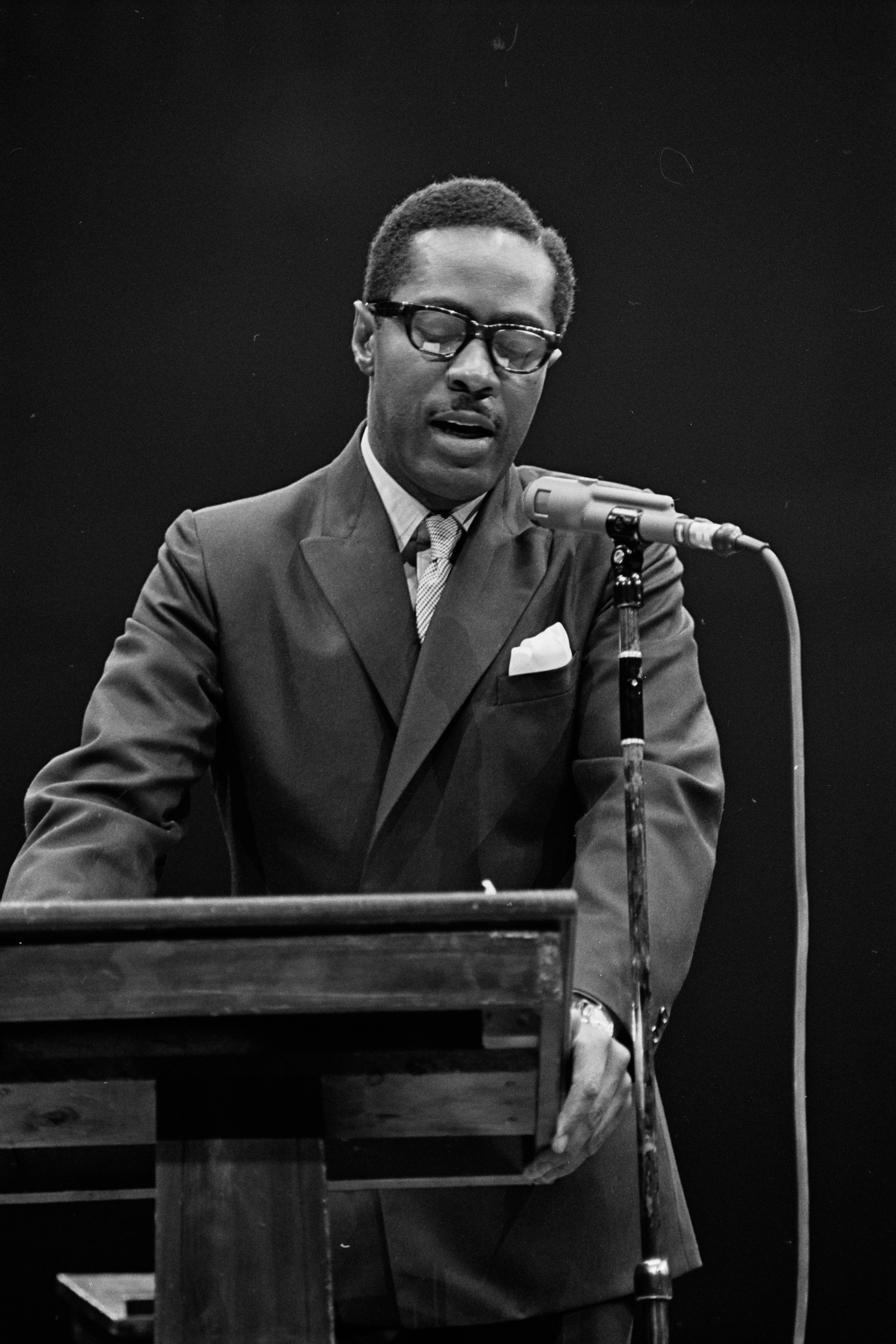
- Jones at a rally for Eugene McCarthy at Madison Square Garden in 1968.
- Born: Clarence Benjamin Jones; January 8, 1931; Philadelphia, Pennsylvania, U.S.
- Died: May 22, 2026 (aged 95); Cupertino, California, U.S.
- Education: Columbia University (BA); Boston University (LLB)
- Movement: Civil Rights Movement
- Relatives: Richard Schiff (stepson)

Clarence Benjamin Jones (January 8, 1931 – May 22, 2026) was an American lawyer and the personal counsel, advisor, draft speech writer and close friend of Martin Luther King Jr. He was a recipient of the Presidential Medal of Freedom, the nation's highest civilian honor. Jones was a scholar in residence at the Martin Luther King Jr. Institute at Stanford University. He was the author of What Would Martin Say? (HarperCollins, 2008) and Behind the Dream: The Making of the Speech that Transformed a Nation (Palgrave-Macmillan, 2011). His book Last of the Lions was released on August 1, 2023 (Redhawk Publications). Jones served as chairman of the non-profit Spill the Honey Foundation. Jones purpose as chairman of Spill the Honey Foundation was stated, "“An example of a current initiative to restore this coalition is the Spill the Honey Foundation in Detroit, MI. They seek to rebuild the historical coalition that existed between the African American and Jewish communities. Spill the Honey uses Holocaust education and ethical lessons learned from the Holocaust that contributed to the Civil Rights Movement.”

In 1962, Martin Luther King Jr. wrote a letter recommending his lawyer and advisor, Clarence B. Jones, to the New York State Bar, stating: "Ever since I have known Mr. Jones, I have always seen him as a man of sound judgment, deep insights, and great dedication. I am also convinced that he is a man of great integrity."

== Early life and education ==
Jones was born January 8, 1931, to parents who were domestic workers in Philadelphia. He was raised in a foster home and brought up in the Catholic religion; he attended a Sisters of the Blessed Sacrament boarding school in New England, as did his mother. Later he and his family moved to Palmyra, New Jersey; he graduated from Palmyra High School.

He earned a bachelor's degree from Columbia College in 1953. Following his graduation he was drafted into the United States Army in 1953 and spent nearly two years at Fort Dix when he declined to sign a loyalty oath.

== Legal and financial career ==
In 1956, he began attending Boston University School of Law, obtaining his Bachelor of Laws degree in 1959. He and his wife Anne moved to Altadena, California, where Jones established a practice in entertainment law.

In 1967, at age 36, Jones joined the investment banking and brokerage firm of Carter, Berlind & Weill where he worked alongside future Citigroup Chairman and CEO, Sanford I. Weill and Securities and Exchange Commission Chairman, Arthur Levitt. Jones was the first African-American to be named an allied member of the New York Stock Exchange.

== Martin Luther King Jr. ==
Jones joined the team of lawyers defending King in the midst of King's 1960 tax fraud trial; the case was resolved in King's favor in May 1960. Jones and his family relocated to New York to be close to the Harlem office of the Southern Christian Leadership Conference (SCLC), and he joined the firm of Lubell, Lubell, and Jones as a partner. In 1962, Jones became general counsel for the Gandhi Society for Human Rights, SCLC's fundraising arm.

Later 1962, Jones advised King to write President John F. Kennedy on the Cuban Missile Crisis. He urged King to make a statement because "your status as a leader requires that you not be silent about an event and issues so decisive to the world" (Jones, 1 November 1962).

He accompanied King, Wyatt Tee Walker, Stanley Levison, Jack O'Dell, and others to the SCLC training facility in Dorchester, Georgia, for an early January 1963 strategy meeting to plan the Birmingham Campaign. Following King's 12 April arrest in Birmingham for violating a related injunction against demonstrations, Jones secretly took from jail King's hand-written response to eight Birmingham clergymen who had denounced the protests in the newspaper. It was typed and circulated among the Birmingham clergy and later printed and distributed nationally as "Letter from Birmingham Jail". Jones helped secure bail money for King and the other jailed protesters by flying to New York to meet with New York Governor Nelson Rockefeller, who gave Jones the bail funds directly from his family's vault at Chase Manhattan Bank.

Jones continued to function as King's lawyer and advisor through the remainder of his life, assisting him in drafting the first portion of the 1963 "I Have a Dream" speech at Jones's house in Riverdale, Bronx, and preserving King's copyright of the momentous address; acting as part of the successful defense team for the SCLC in New York Times v. Sullivan; serving as part of King's inner circle of advisers, called the "research committee"; representing King at meetings (for example the Baldwin-Kennedy meeting); and contributing with Vincent Harding and Andrew Young to King's "Beyond Vietnam" address at New York's Riverside Church on 4 April 1967.

== After King ==
After King's death, Jones served as one of the negotiators during the 1971 prison riot at Attica, and was editor and part owner of the New York Amsterdam News from 1971 to 1974. In 1982, Jones was convicted of defrauding financial clients and shifted to a full-time business career.

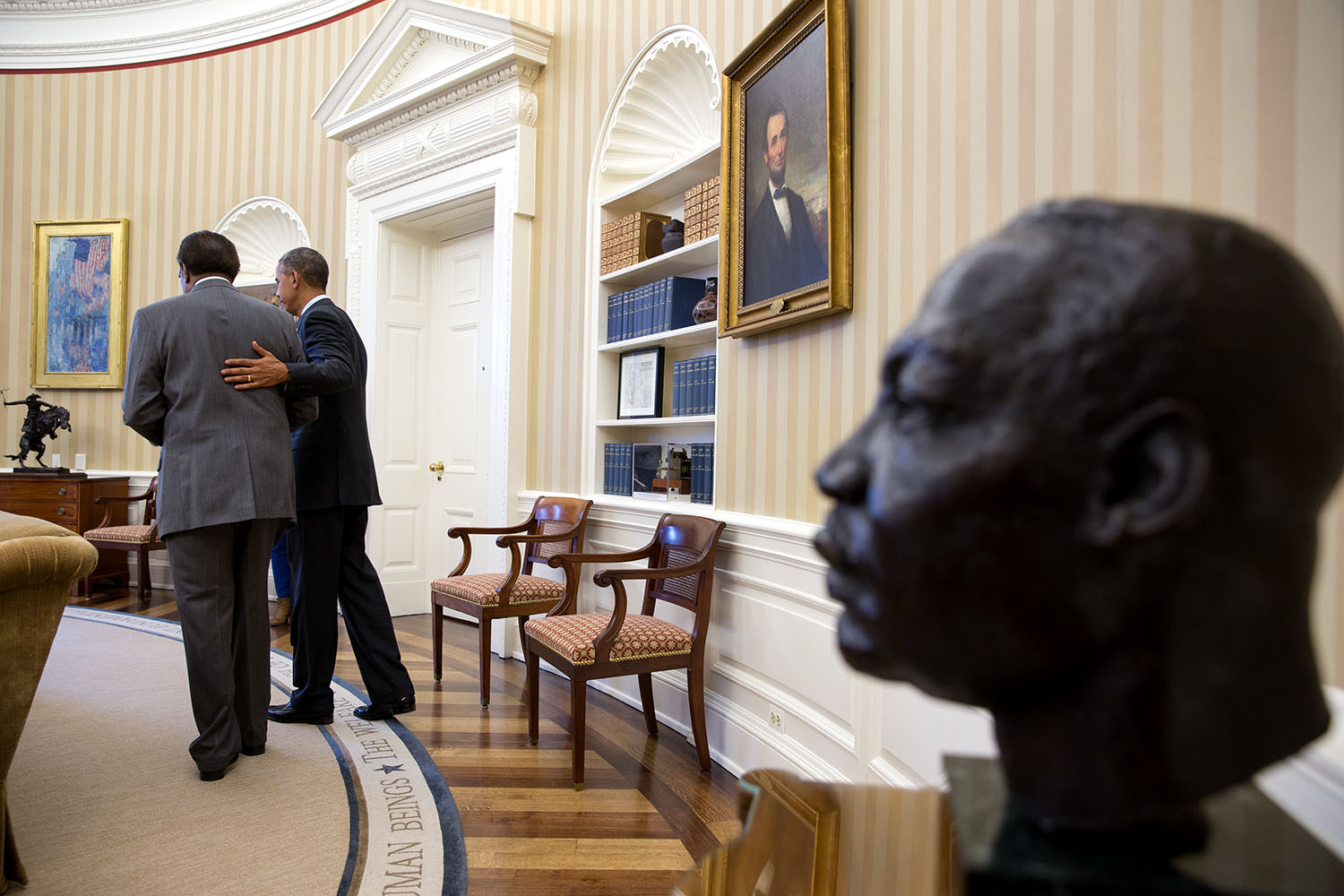
Jones (left) meeting President Barack Obama at the White House in 2015

In summing up his sentiments on King's life, Jones remarked in a 2007 interview:

Except for Abraham Lincoln and the Emancipation Proclamation of 1863, Martin Luther King Jr., in 12 years and 4 months from 1956 to 1968, did more to achieve justice in America than any other event or person in the previous 400 years.

In 2018 Jones and Jonathan D. Greenberg co-founded the University of San Francisco (USF) Institute for Nonviolence and Social Justice to disseminate the teachings of King and Mahatma Gandhi.

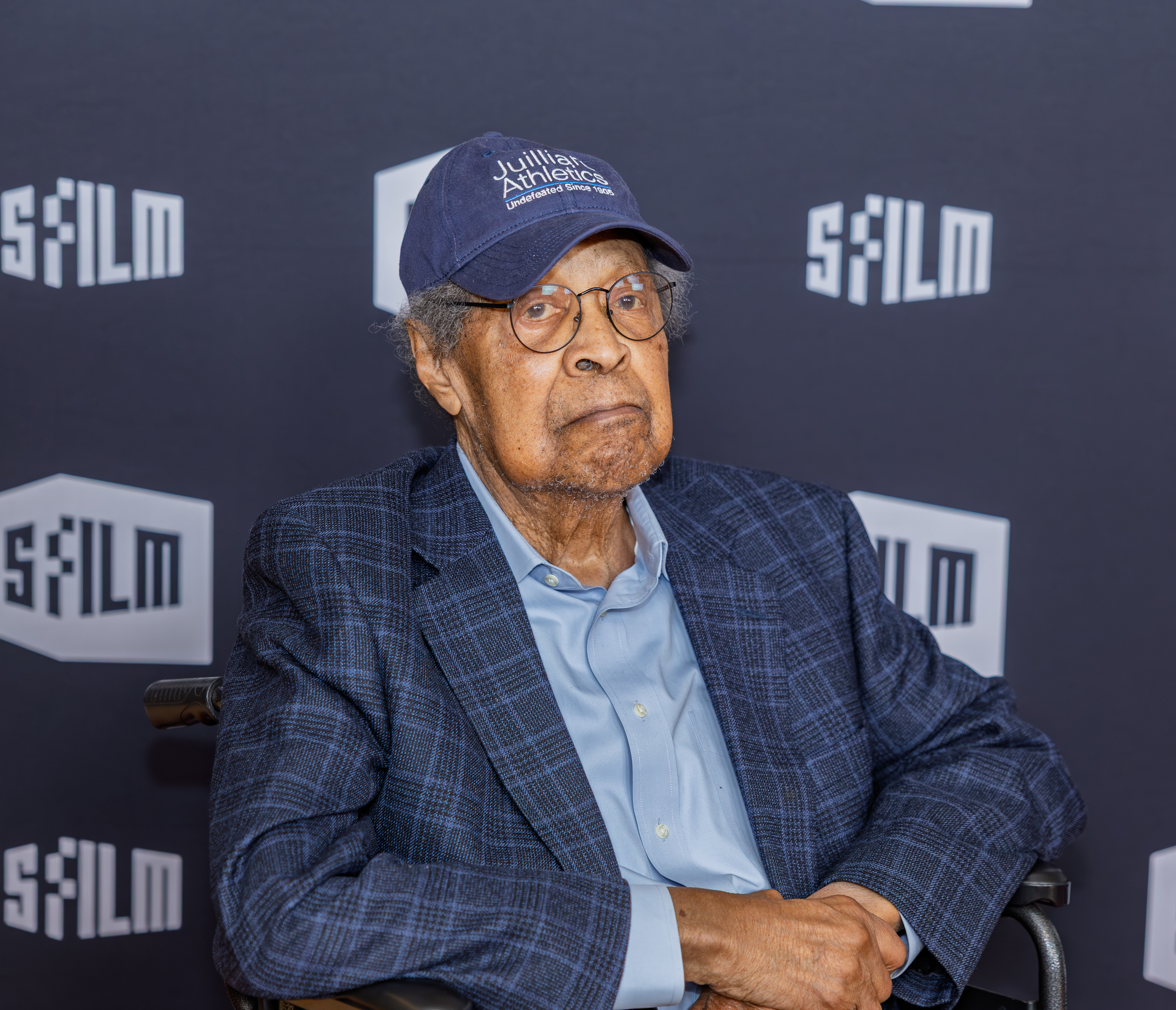
Jones at SFFILM in 2026

After Gov. Jerry Brown signed into law (in the fall of 2016) a mandate to develop an ethnic studies program for high schools in California, within a few years some experts were upset about the ESMC ("Ethnic Studies Model Curriculum") that had been proposed. Among those experts was Clarence Jones. Jones (in a letter he wrote to Gov. Gavin Newsom and the state's Instructional Quality Commission) called the ESMC a "perversion of history" for providing material referring to non-violent Black leaders as "passive" and "docile". Jones decried the "glorification" of violence and Black nationalism as "role models for the students", and rejected the proposed model curriculum as "morally indecent and deeply offensive".

== Personal life and death ==
Jones was married to his first wife Ann, the daughter of William Warder Norton, and they had two sons, Clarence Jr. and Dana, and two daughters, Christine and Alexia. They divorced in 1970. Jones later married Charlotte Schiff, and became the stepfather to actor and director Richard Schiff and producer Paul Schiff.

Jones died at an assisted living facility in Cupertino, California, on May 22, 2026, at the age of 95.

== Legacy ==
The Dr. Clarence B. Jones Institute for Social Advocacy was dedicated in his honor in June 2017 at Palmyra High School in New Jersey. In 2024, President Joe Biden awarded Jones the Presidential Medal of Freedom, the highest civilian honor in the U.S. In 2026, a playground on the Kidango East Palo Alto child care center was dedicated in Jones's name.
