= Palmira =

Palmira may refer to:

== Places ==
- Palmira, Mendoza, a town in San Martín Department, Mendoza, Argentina
- Santos Dumont, Minas Gerais, formerly named Palmira, a city and a municipality in Brazil
- Palmira, Valle del Cauca, a city and a municipality in Colombia
- Palmira, a village in Hojancha District, Costa Rica
- Palmira, Cuba
- Palmira, Chiriquí, Panama
- Palmira, Colón, Panama
- Palmira, Los Santos, Panama
- Palmira, Táchira, a town in Venezuela

== Other uses ==
- Palmira, regina di Persia, an opera
- FC Palmira Odesa, Ukrainian association football club
- MV Ocean Life or Palmira, a cruise ship

== People ==
- Palmira (name)

== See also ==
- Nueva Palmira a city in Colonia, Uruguay
- Palmyra (disambiguation)
