= Palmyra Township =

Palmyra Township may refer to:

- Palmyra Township, Lee County, Illinois
- Palmyra Township, Knox County, Indiana
- Palmyra Township, Warren County, Iowa, in Warren County, Iowa
- Palmyra Township, Douglas County, Kansas
- Palmyra Township, Michigan
- Palmyra Township, Renville County, Minnesota
- Palmyra Township, Halifax County, North Carolina, in Halifax County, North Carolina
- Palmyra Township, Portage County, Ohio
- Palmyra Township, Pike County, Pennsylvania
- Palmyra Township, Wayne County, Pennsylvania
- Palmyra Township, Brown County, South Dakota, in Brown County, South Dakota

== See also ==
- Palmyra (disambiguation)
- North Palmyra Township, Macoupin County, Illinois
- South Palmyra Township, Macoupin County, Illinois
