= Kelvin Harmon =

Liberian-born American football player (born 1997)

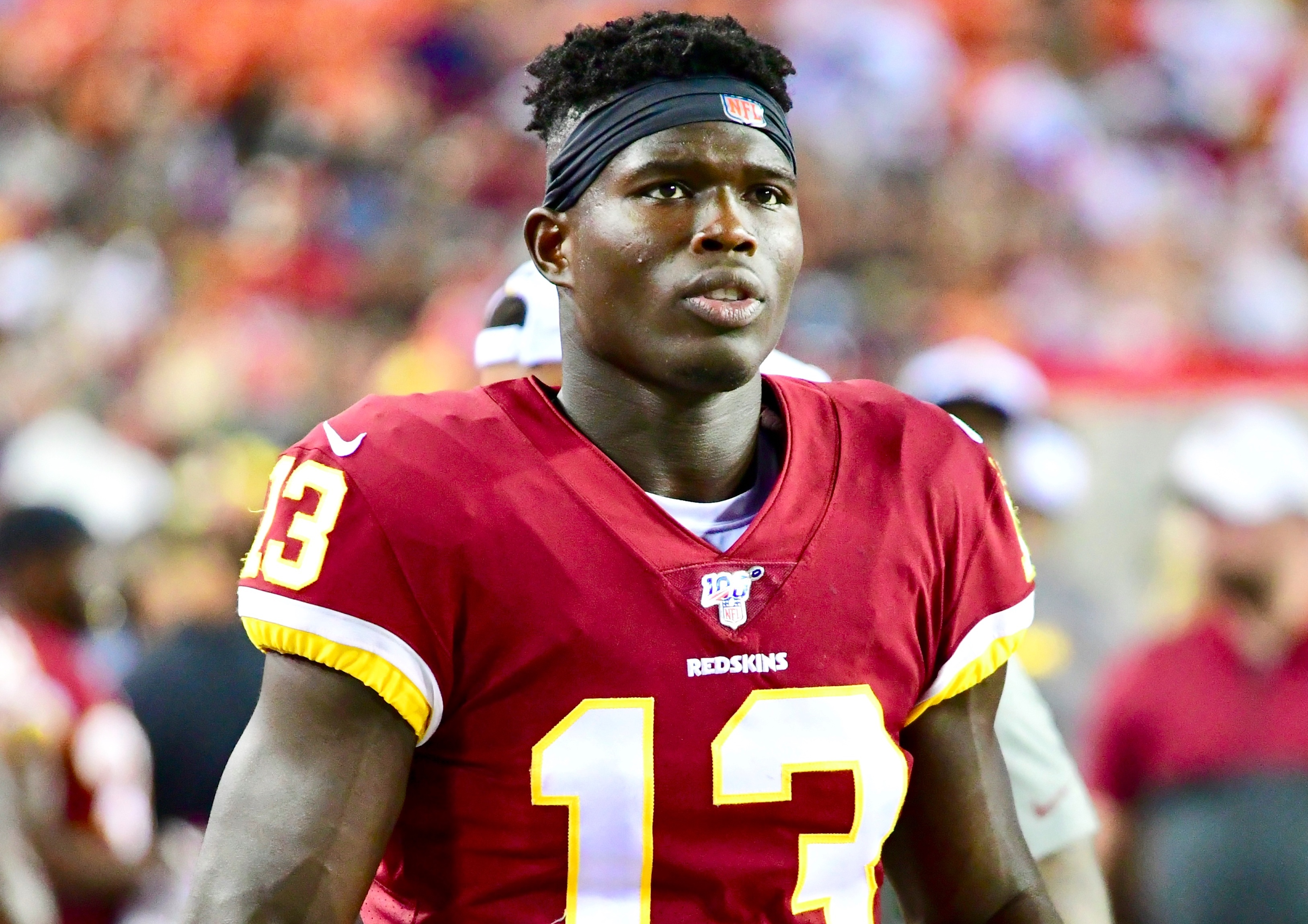
- Harmon with the Washington Redskins in 2019

Profile
- Position: Wide receiver

Personal information
- Born: December 15, 1996 (age 29); Monrovia, Liberia
- Listed height: 6 ft 2 in (1.88 m)
- Listed weight: 215 lb (98 kg)

Career information
- High school: Palmyra (Palmyra, New Jersey, U.S.)
- College: NC State (2016–2018)
- NFL draft: 2019: 6th round, 206th overall pick

Career history
- Washington Redskins / Football Team (2019–2021); Philadelphia Stars (2023)*; DC Defenders (2024); Dallas Cowboys (2024)*
- * Offseason or practice squad member only

Awards and highlights
- First-team All-ACC (2018); Second-team All-ACC (2017)

Career NFL statistics
- Receptions: 30
- Receiving yards: 365
- Stats at Pro Football Reference

Kelvin Harmon (born December 15, 1996) is a Liberian professional American football wide receiver. Born in Monrovia, he came to the United States at the age of four. Harmon played college football for the NC State Wolfpack and was selected by the Washington Redskins in the sixth round of the 2019 NFL draft.

== Early life ==
Harmon was born in Monrovia, the capital of Liberia, on December 15, 1996, and moved to Palmyra, New Jersey, in the United States when he was four. There, he attended Palmyra High School and had 165 receptions for 2,764 yards and 36 touchdowns. A 4-star recruit, he originally committed to South Carolina to play college football, but decommitted and attended NC State instead, over offers from Indiana, Miami, North Carolina, Rutgers, and West Virginia, among others.

== College career ==
As a freshman at NC State in 2016, Harmon had 27 receptions for 462 yards and five touchdowns. As a sophomore in 2017, he had 69 receptions for 1,017 yards and four touchdowns. He was the first NC State receiver to have 1,000 yards since 2003. As a junior in 2018, he had 81 receptions for 1,186 receiving yards and seven receiving touchdowns.

=== College statistics ===
| Year | Games | Rec | Yards | Avg | TDs |
|---|---|---|---|---|---|
| 2016 | 10 | 27 | 462 | 17.1 | 5 |
| 2017 | 13 | 69 | 1,017 | 14.7 | 4 |
| 2018 | 12 | 81 | 1,186 | 14.6 | 7 |
| Career | 35 | 177 | 2,665 | 15.1 | 16 |

== Professional career ==
Pre-draft measurables
| Height | Weight | Arm length | Hand span | Wingspan | 40-yard dash | 10-yard split | 20-yard split | 20-yard shuttle | Three-cone drill | Vertical jump | Broad jump | Bench press |
|---|---|---|---|---|---|---|---|---|---|---|---|---|
| 6 ft 2 1/2 in (1.89 m) | 221 lb (100 kg) | 32 1/2 in (0.83 m) | 9 1/2 in (0.24 m) | 6 ft 3 1/2 in (1.92 m) | 4.60 s | 1.54 s | 2.69 s | 4.32 s | 7.15 s | 32.5 in (0.83 m) | 9 ft 9 in (2.97 m) | 18 reps |
All values from NFL Combine

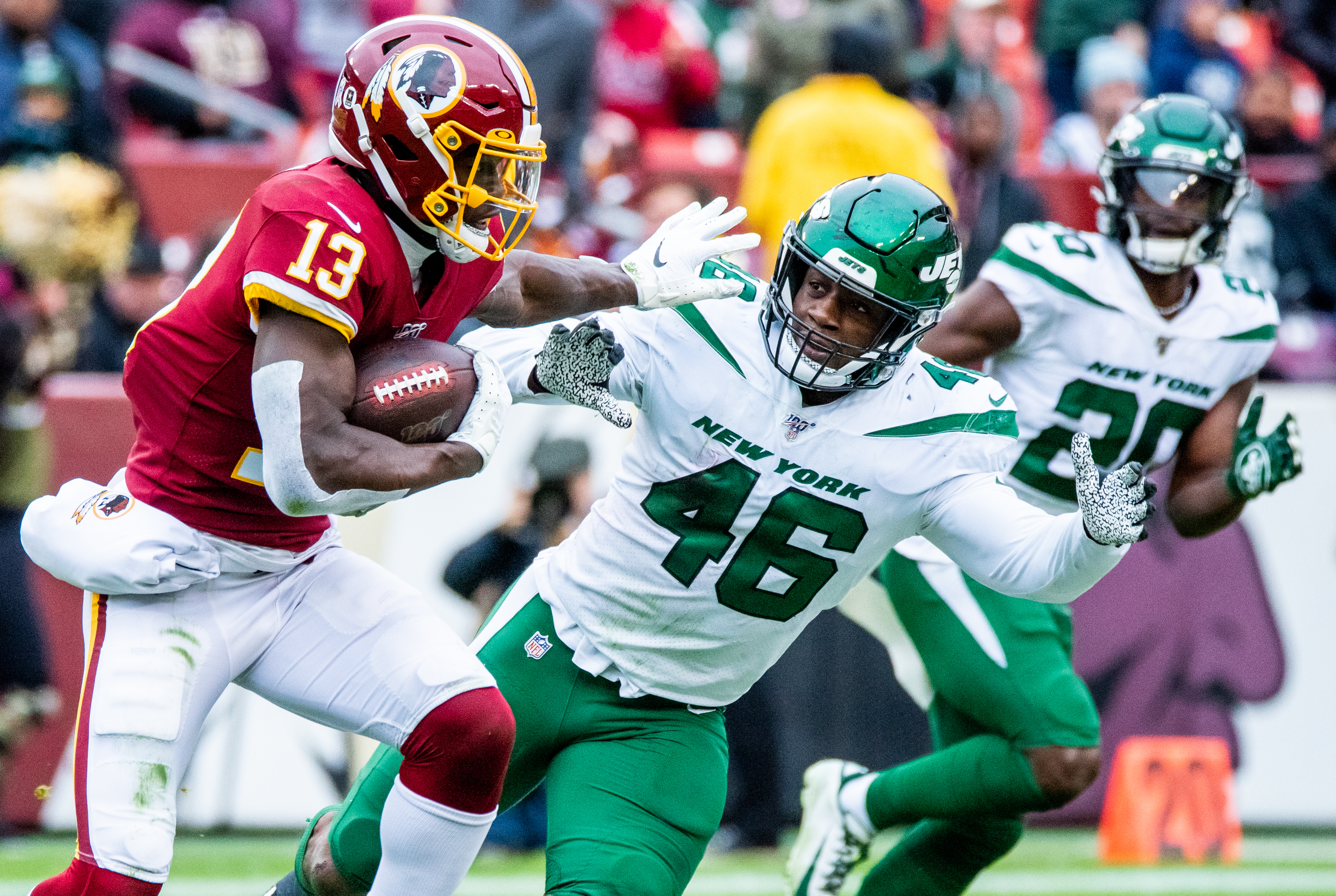
Harmon playing against the New York Jets in 2019

=== Washington Redskins / Football Team ===
In December 2018, Harmon announced that he would forgo his final year of eligibility and declared for the 2019 NFL draft, where he was drafted by the Washington Redskins in the sixth round with the 206th overall pick. In the Redskins' 2019 season opener against the Philadelphia Eagles, he had two receptions for 31 yards in his NFL debut. Overall, he appeared in all 16 games as a rookie and totaled 30 receptions for 365 yards.

In June 2020, Harmon suffered an ACL tear injury while training and was placed on the team's non-football injury list at the start of training camp the following month. He was moved to the reserve/non-football injury list on September 5, 2020. He was released on August 15, 2021, but re-signed to their practice squad on September 29, 2021. Harmon signed a reserve/futures contract with the team on January 10, 2022, but was waived on August 23, 2022.

=== Philadelphia Stars ===
Harmon signed with the Philadelphia Stars of the United States Football League on March 21, 2023. He was released on April 10.

=== DC Defenders ===
On October 19, 2023, Harmon signed with the DC Defenders of the XFL. He was placed on injured reserve on May 15.

=== Dallas Cowboys ===
On July 27, 2024, Harmon signed with the Dallas Cowboys. He was released during roster cuts on August 27, before re-signing with the team's practice squad the next day. Harmon signed a reserve/future contract with Dallas on January 6, 2025. On July 30, Harmon was waived by the Cowboys.
