= Allan Graf =

American athlete, actor, stuntman and director

- Born: Allan Lee Graf; Wichita, Kansas, U.S.
- Education: University of Southern California
- Occupations: Actor, Stunt coordinator, Film director
- Years active: 1976–current
- Height: 6 ft 2 in (188 cm)

Allan Lee Graf is an American athlete, actor, stuntman and director.

A high school All-American football player at San Fernando in Los Angeles, California, Graf played offensive guard for the undefeated national champion University of Southern California Trojans in 1972. After a brief experience playing professional football, Graf stumbled into stunt work, and over time has become a stunt coordinator in Hollywood, coordinating stunts in football movies like Any Given Sunday and Friday Night Lights. Graf likes to cast himself in onscreen stunt roles, and has appeared in many television shows and movies. Graf has become a second unit director, working on films such as Wayne's World, The Replacements, The Waterboy, We Were Soldiers, and Jerry Maguire.

== Early life and education ==
Allan Lee Graf was raised in Sylmar, California, but transferred to San Fernando High School in tenth grade. According to Graf, San Fernando was the best high school football program in the state in the 1970s. Though originally from mostly white Sylmar, Graf proved himself sufficiently as a defensive player at San Fernando to be elected captain of the more integrated Tigers team as a senior. In 1968, the San Fernando Tigers won the Los Angeles City High School football championship, going undefeated; Graf was selected L.A. City co-player of the year and a Parade Magazine All-American at defensive tackle.

Are the 1972 Trojans the greatest team of all time? How can you ask me that? I'm biased. I want to say this, if you ask guys who played in the pros; Batman Woods, Charles Anthony, any of those guys . . . Sam Cunningham will tell you the best team he ever played for was the '72 Trojans.

— Allan Graf, 2009, quoted by Steven Travers,

Heavily recruited by Pac-8 universities, Graf opted to stay in his native Los Angeles to play for John McKay and the University of Southern California Trojans. Graf was unhappy when line coach Rod Humenuik told him he'd be playing offensive tackle. Graf liked to tackle offensive ball carriers; with his natural aggressiveness, he felt he would play better on defense. Humenuik said: "With your speed you're a great pulling guard. You have a natural tendency to pull with your hips." Graf started three years at tackle for the Trojans. During USC's remarkable undefeated 1972 season, Graf played with Trojan legends Lynn Swann, Pat Haden and Sam Cunningham, helped Anthony Davis to get a record six touchdowns against rival Notre Dame, and won a national championship ring after defeating Ohio State in the 1973 Rose Bowl. The 1972 USC Trojans have sometimes been classed among the best college football teams of all time. Thirty three teammates on the 1972 roster would eventually be drafted by teams in the National Football League, including five first round picks.

== Career ==
=== Football ===
Unpicked in the 1973 NFL draft, Graf attended the Los Angeles Rams' 1973 fall training camp as a free agent. Playing behind All-Pro Tom Mack in camp, Graf asked to be traded or released, but was the last man cut from camp, leaving him without an NFL contract. Graf was one of several Trojan graduates to join the Portland Storm franchise in the new World Football League, but after the league folded in the middle of its second season, Graf thought his football career was behind him.

=== Film ===
While still playing for the Portland Storm, Graf had taken side work with Disney in Santa Clarita, acting as stunt double to Chicago Bears player Dick Butkus on a children's sports comedy Gus about a field goal-kicking mule. Butkus invited Graf to double for him on television projects several times in the following years, and soon Graf was getting stunt work on his own.

...Walter Hill gave me my opportunity to direct second unit on Johnny Handsome. I have been with Walter over 20 years. I worked with him on the pilot of Deadwood.

— Allan Graf, March 20, 2005,

Frequent collaborations with director Walter Hill gave Graf the experience and confidence to do more than just stunt work; in 1989 he was asked by Hill not only to coordinate stunts for his new film Johnny Handsome, but also to direct the film's second unit, a first for Graf.

Graf's stunt coordination received much attention in Walter Hill's 1990 film Another 48 Hrs., after he performed a "cannon-roll" using a school bus at speed, lifting the bus 17 feet (5.2 m) in the air with dynamite, and rolling it down the highway for 285 feet (87 m).

==== Sports films ====
Graf's special connection with sports has led him to be one of Hollywood's most capable and experienced football stunt coordinators. Starting with Gus, Graf has performed or coordinated stunts in over a dozen football-related films. For Friday Night Lights Graf personally interviewed over 900 candidates for a forty-man roster, including doubles for the actors involved. After deciding on talent, Graf put together a playbook and started the roster running plays, gradually working the actors into the practices. "My rule of thumb is we never hit an actor. We can't afford anyone to get hurt. When we did Any Given Sunday, we could do some controlled stuff, but it is very limited how much you can do." Graf is often called "Coach" on set. Referring to 2000's The Replacements reporter Liz Segal said, "Staging plays for Howard Deutch’s comedy about replacement players during the 1987 NFL strike gave Graf his biggest thrill ever. To get that real pro-football feel, some sequences had to be filmed during a Baltimore Ravens’ halftime."

Different directors want different things. The one thing I was happy about with Pete Berg with Friday Night Lights is that he wanted reality. That's what I really like. I like to make it very violent and very real. When I did Jerry Maguire, Cameron Crowe wanted it to look exactly like Monday Night Football and we did it just like that.

— Allan Graf, March 20, 2005

As the result of his experience coordinating stunts on sports movies, Graf has developed a regular "team" of stuntmen he can call on to get just the right look for the film. Graf's knowledge of the history of the game makes him especially useful. "for The Express: The Ernie Davis Story, based on Syracuse's Ernie Davis in 1961 becoming the first African-American to win the Heisman Trophy, [Graf] needed smaller players – and ones who could adopt that era's playing styles."

=== Second Unit Director ===
Graf has directed the second unit of photography on many sports-related motion pictures where his stunt coordination made him a key decision maker, but he has also directed second unit in many mainstream comedies, starting with Wayne's World in 1992. Especially in collaboration with Walter Hill, with whom he shares association in many movie projects, Graf's experience has grown in the action film genre, especially in the Western. In 2004, Graf helped Hill create and execute realistic stunts for the premiere of David Milch's Deadwood television series on HBO. Graf was himself cast as the bodyguard "Captain Joe Turner" of series antagonist George Hearst. In episode five of the third season, Graf's character and his camp rival Dan Dority (portrayed by William Earl Brown) engaged in a climactic and gritty five-minute bare-knuckle brawl which was described by one reviewer as "a bloody marvel."

== Personal life ==
Graf and wife Betty have three children, all USC alums or students: Derek, Nicole and Kevin. Graf's sons have played football as legacies at USC: Derek Graf played center and right offensive tackle for the 2002 squad, and Kevin Graf started at right offensive tackle for 37 games before graduation.
