= Palmyra High School (New Jersey) =

High school in Burlington County, New Jersey, US

Location
- 311 West 5th Street; Palmyra, Burlington County, New Jersey 08065; United States; 40.002526°N 75.02759°W

Information
- Type: Public high school
- Established: 1895
- School district: Palmyra Public Schools
- NCES School ID: 341239001188
- Principal: Daniel Licata
- Faculty: 29.8 FTEs
- Grades: 9-12
- Enrollment: 385 (as of 2024–25)
- Student to teacher ratio: 12.9:1
- Colors: Red and White
- Athletics conference: Burlington County Scholastic League (general); West Jersey Football League (football)
- Team name: Panthers
- Rival: Burlington City Blue Devils
- Website: phs.palmyraschools.com

Palmyra High School is a four-year comprehensive public high school that serves students in ninth through twelfth grades from Palmyra in Burlington County, in the U.S. state of New Jersey, operating as the lone secondary school of the Palmyra Public Schools. High school classes began shortly after the completion of the Spring Garden Street School in 1895, which is on the National Register of Historic Places. With increased enrollment, the school was moved to a former girls school, Berkeley Hall, in 1907, and to its own building in 1909. A large addition was completed in 1922. The 1909 structure was destroyed by fire in 1957, and after a vote that narrowly defeated establishing a regional high school, additions were made to the building in 1958 and 1961.

As of the 2024–25 school year, the school had an enrollment of 385 students and 29.8 classroom teachers (on an FTE basis), for a student–teacher ratio of 12.9:1. There were 146 students (37.9% of enrollment) eligible for free lunch and 26 (6.8% of students) eligible for reduced-cost lunch.

Students from Beverly and Riverton attend the district's high school as part of sending/receiving relationships. In past years, students from Cinnaminson Township, Delanco Township, Delran Township, Riverside Township, and the Delair portion of Pennsauken Township had also attended Palmyra High School.

== Awards, recognition, and rankings ==
The school was the 260th-ranked public high school in New Jersey out of 339 schools statewide in New Jersey Monthly magazine's September 2014 cover story on the state's "Top Public High Schools," using a new ranking methodology. The school had been ranked 222nd in the state of 328 schools in 2012, after being ranked 208th in 2010 out of 322 schools listed. The magazine ranked the school 224th in 2008 out of 316 schools. The school was ranked 275th in the magazine's September 2006 issue, which surveyed 316 schools across the state.

Schooldigger.com ranked the school 318th out of 381 public high schools statewide in its 2011 rankings (a decrease of 16 positions from the 2010 ranking) which were based on the combined percentage of students classified as proficient or above proficient on the mathematics (94.6%) and language arts literacy (97.9%) components of the High School Proficiency Assessment (HSPA).

In 2023, the school was awarded the Lighthouse Award by the Commissioner of Education, Angelica Allen-McMillan for "Increasing Equity in AP/IB Enrollment".

== Athletics ==
The Palmyra High School Panthers compete in the Freedom division of the Burlington County Scholastic League (BCSL), a sports association operating under the jurisdiction of the New Jersey State Interscholastic Athletic Association (NJSIAA) that is comprised of public and private high schools in Burlington, Mercer and Ocean counties in Central Jersey. With 309 students in grades 10–12, the school was classified by the NJSIAA for the 2022–24 school years as Group I South for most athletic competition purposes. The football team competes in the Classic Division of the 94-team West Jersey Football League superconference and was classified by the NJSIAA as Group I South for football for 2024–2026, which included schools with 185 to 482 students.

The school mascot is currently the Panther, but at the time of the school's inception, its teams were known as the Red Devils. This name was then changed to the Pals, which was used until the 1980s. The school colors have remained the same: red and white.

Students competed in track and field as early as 1903, and in football by 1908. Palmyra's overall record in football, through the 2023 season, is 559 wins, 466 losses, and 49 ties. The team was declared the South Jersey Group II champion in 1946, 1947, 1948, 1951, and 1953; the Group III title was won in 1963, and Group I honors were won in 1971 and 1972. The team won the South Jersey Group I state sectional playoffs in 1978. The Palmyra / Burlington City High School football rivalry for the Fred Wilbert Memorial Trophy, begun in 1908, is one of the oldest in South Jersey; Palmyra leads the series 57–50–12. The game was not played in 2020; the first interruption since 1934, as Burlington City cancelled their fall sports season due to the pandemic. Palmyra won the renewal game in 2021 by the score of 25–20. The Palmyra / Riverside High School rivalry dates from 1928, and Palmyra leads that series 65–23–3; after a 50–24 victory in 2022; Palmyra has won 22 consecutive games in the series (no game was played in 2023). The Palmyra High School football stadium was built by the Works Progress Administration in 1936 and was renovated to include lighting.

The boys track team won the Group II spring / outdoor track state championship in 1942–1945, 1950, 1951, 1954–1956, and won the Group I title in 1979 and 1980. The program's 11 state titles are tied for fifth-most in the state.

The boys' basketball team won the 1956 Group II state title, defeating runner-up Roselle Park High School by a score of 59–38 in the tournament final.

The baseball team won the Group I state championship in 1973, defeating Cedar Grove High School in the tournament final.

The Palmyra boys soccer team won their first South Jersey Group I state sectional championship in 1989 with a 1–0 win in double overtime against a Haddonfield Memorial High School team that came into the title game undefeated. The team was the 2009 State Group I co-champion with Jonathan Dayton High School after the title game ended in a 0–0 tie. The team won the South Jersey title, beating Pitman High School on penalty kicks in a 2–2 tie; they won the state semi-final in the same fashion, defeating Metuchen High School 4–1 on penalty kicks in a scoreless match. The boys won the 2023 South Jersey Group I championship by defeating Schalick, 2–1.

The 2006 girls' soccer team won the South Jersey, Group I state sectional title with a 1–0 win against Woodstown High School in the tournament final, the team's first-ever title.

The girls' basketball team won the 2007 South Jersey, Group I state sectional championship with a 46–37 win over Wildwood High School in the tournament final. The team won their semifinal game in the Group I state championship tournament, defeating Highland Park High School 49–43, before falling to University High School in the championship game.

The girls soccer team won the 2022 South Jersey Group I title, defeating Audubon High School in the tournament final by a score of 4–1 at the Palmyra stadium.

== Administration ==
The school's principal is Daniel Licata.

== Notable alumni ==
- Al Bunge (born 1937), National Basketball Association first-round pick (seventh pick overall) of the Philadelphia Warriors in the 1960 NBA draft
- Deron Cherry (born 1959, class of 1977), played in the NFL for the Kansas City Chiefs 1981-1991 and was a six-time Pro Bowler at Safety
- Kelvin Harmon (born 1997), wide receiver for the Washington Redskins
- Derek Holloway (born 1961, class of 1979), retired football player, who was a wide receiver in the NFL for the Washington Redskins and the Tampa Bay Buccaneers
- Clarence Benjamin Jones (born 1931, class of 1949), lawyer and former personal counsel, advisor, draft speech writer and close friend of Martin Luther King Jr. The Dr. Clarence B. Jones Institute for Social Advocacy was dedicated in his honor in June 2017
- Quron Pratt (born 1991, class of 2010), signed by the Philadelphia Eagles in 2014
- Earl Rowe (1920–2002, class of 1938), actor best known for playing Lt. Dave Barton in the 1958 film The Blob
- Ernest F. Schuck (1929–2009), politician who served for seven years as mayor of Barrington, New Jersey and eight years in the New Jersey General Assembly, from 1974 to 1982, where he represented the 5th Legislative District
- Hal Wagner (1915–1979, class of 1934), MLB catcher from 1937 to 1949
