= Palmyra, New Jersey =

Borough in Burlington County, New Jersey, US

- Borough
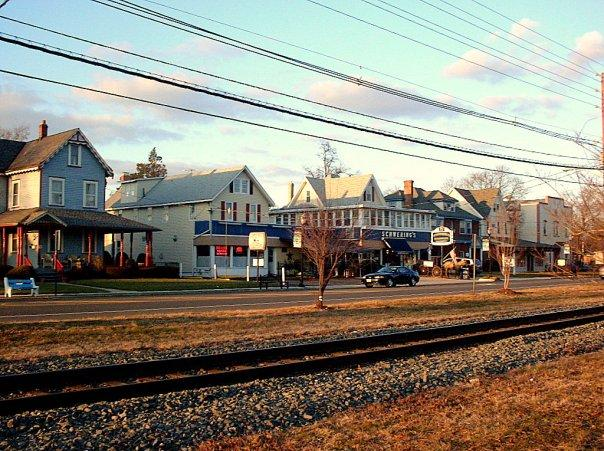
- East Broad Street near northern edge of the borough with River Line tracks in foreground

- Seal
- Motto: "A Place to Grow"
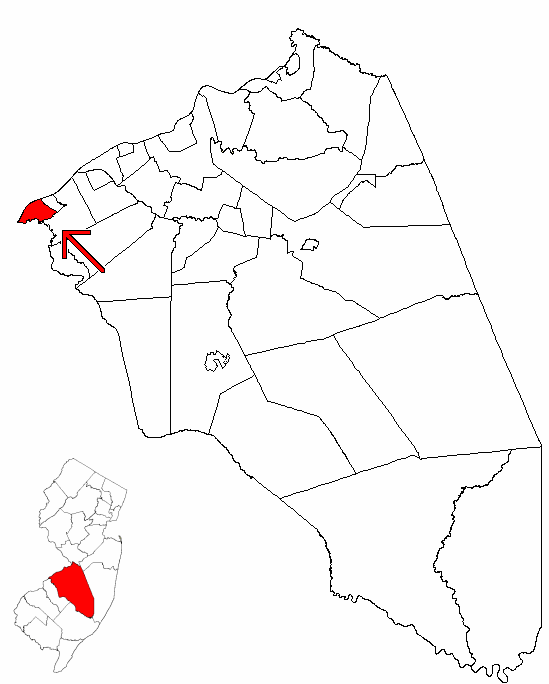
- Location of Palmyra in Burlington County highlighted in red (right). Inset map: Location of Burlington County in New Jersey highlighted in red (lower left).

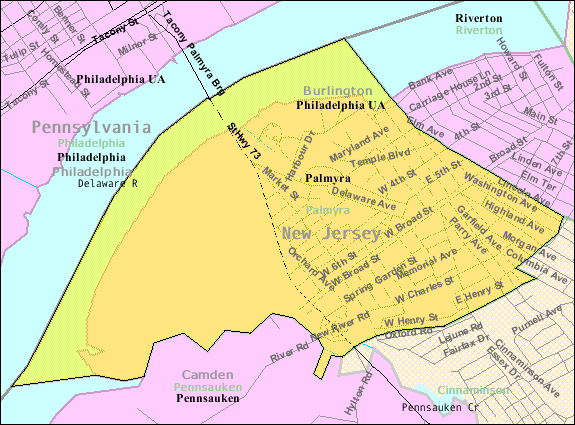
- Census Bureau map of Palmyra, New Jersey

- Location in Burlington County Location in New Jersey Location in the United States
- Coordinates: 40.002615°N 75.035273°W
- Country: United States
- State: New Jersey
- County: Burlington
- Incorporated: April 19, 1894
- Named for: Palmyra, Syria

Government
  - Type: Borough
  - Body: Borough Council
  - Mayor: Gina Ragomo Tait (D, term ends December 31, 2027)
  - Administrator: John J. Gural
  - Municipal clerk: Doretha (Rita) Jackson

Area
  - Total: 2.54 sq mi (6.58 km^{2})
  - Land: 1.85 sq mi (4.79 km^{2})
  - Water: 0.69 sq mi (1.79 km^{2}) 27.28%
  - Rank: 371st of 565 in state 32nd of 40 in county
- Elevation: 7 ft (2.1 m)

Population (2020)
  - Total: 7,438
  - Estimate (2023): 7,489
  - Rank: 308th of 565 in state 23rd of 40 in county
  - Density: 4,022.7/sq mi (1,553.2/km^{2})
  - Rank: 157th of 565 in state 7th of 40 in county
- Time zone: UTC– 05:00 (Eastern (EST))
  - Summer (DST): UTC– 04:00 (Eastern (EDT))
- ZIP Code: 08065
- Area code: 856 exchanges: 303, 726, 829, 786
- FIPS code: 3400555800
- GNIS feature ID: 0885339
- Website: www.boroughofpalmyra.com

Palmyra is a borough in Burlington County, in the U.S. state of New Jersey. As of the 2020 United States census, the borough's population was 7,438, an increase of 40 (+0.5%) from the 2010 census count of 7,398, which in turn reflected an increase of 307 (+4.3%) from the 7,091 counted in the 2000 census. The borough, and all of Burlington County, is a part of the Philadelphia metropolitan area.

Palmyra was originally incorporated as a township by an act of the New Jersey Legislature on April 19, 1894, from portions of Cinnaminson Township and Riverton. On February 20, 1923, Palmyra was reincorporated as a borough.

== History ==
The area that is now Palmyra was settled in the late 17th century by Swedes, marking the northernmost border of New Sweden. A farmhouse built in 1761 by the third generation of settlers still remains as the oldest house in Palmyra. Farming was the primary use of land in Palmyra and the surrounding area until after the construction of the Camden and Amboy Railroad in 1834 with a station in the area, after which railroad workers built homes on lots they purchased along the railroad right of way. The community was originally known as Texas, but a local landowner, Isaiah Toy, a descendant of the original Swedish settlers and a stockholder in the Camden and Amboy Railroad, who wanted to have a post office established in the community, convinced the railroad to change the name of the station in 1849 to Palmyra, which came from his love of ancient history. Palmyra was the name of an ancient trading center located in central Syria. The post office was established in 1851. Palmyra, along with the city of Burlington and the townships of Bordentown, Moorestown, and Mount Holly, established its high school in the late 1890s, making it one of the oldest high schools in Burlington County and in New Jersey.

The community was laid out in 1850, when Joseph Souder's land was broken up into building lots to pay his debts, with the street names matching those of Center City, Philadelphia—Market, Arch, Race, and Vine (from south to north), and Front Street and numbered streets from the Delaware River. What is now Palmyra was part of Chester Township (now Maple Shade Township), which was created in 1694 and was one of the original 104 townships in New Jersey incorporated in 1798. Palmyra became a part of Cinnaminson Township when that township was set off from Chester in 1860. Palmyra Township was set off from Cinnaminson in 1894, and Palmyra was incorporated as a borough in 1923.

== Geography ==
According to the United States Census Bureau, the borough had a total area of 2.54 square miles (6.58 km^{2}), including 1.85 square miles (4.79 km^{2}) of land and 0.69 square miles (1.79 km^{2}) of water (27.28%).

Unincorporated communities, localities and place names located partially or completely within the borough include West Palmyra.

The borough borders Cinnaminson Township and Riverton in Burlington County; Pennsauken Township in Camden County; and Philadelphia, across the Delaware River in Pennsylvania.

The borough is connected to the Tacony section of Philadelphia via Route 73 by the Tacony-Palmyra Bridge, which is named for the two communities connected by the bridge. The bridge was completed in 1929 at a cost of $4 million.

In 1999, a 250-acre (100 ha) nature park, Palmyra Nature Cove, was opened along the banks of the Delaware which borders Palmyra on the west; in addition to serving as a bird sanctuary, the park offers educational programs for schools and hiking trails for walkers. The park is open from dawn to dusk; no pets or bicycles are allowed.

== Demographics ==
Historical population
Census	Pop.	Note	%±
1880	571		—
1890	1,903		233.3%
1900	2,300		20.9%
1910	2,801		21.8%
1920	3,834		36.9%
1930	4,968		29.6%
1940	5,178		4.2%
1950	5,802		12.1%
1960	7,036		21.3%
1970	6,969		−1.0%
1980	7,085		1.7%
1990	7,056		−0.4%
2000	7,091		0.5%
2010	7,398		4.3%
2020	7,438		0.5%
2023 (est.)	7,489	▲	0.7%
Population sources: 1880–1890; 1900–2000 1900–1920; 1900–1910 1910–1930; 1940–2000 2000; 2010 2020

=== 2020 census ===
Palmyra is a borough located in Burlington County, New Jersey. Palmyra has a 2026 population of 7,708. Palmyra is currently growing at a rate of 0.57% annually and its population has increased by 3.59% since the most recent census, which recorded a population of 7,441 in 2020. The median age was 42.4 years. 17.5% of residents were under the age of 18 and 17.9% of residents were 65 years of age or older. For every 100 females there were 93.5 males, and for every 100 females age 18 and over there were 90.3 males age 18 and over.

100.0% of residents lived in urban areas, while 0.0% lived in rural areas.

There were 3,271 households in Palmyra, of which 23.4% had children under the age of 18 living in them. Of all households, 35.9% were married-couple households, 20.2% were households with a male householder and no spouse or partner present, and 34.3% were households with a female householder and no spouse or partner present. About 33.1% of all households were made up of individuals and 12.5% had someone living alone who was 65 years of age or older.

There were 3,458 housing units, of which 5.4% were vacant. The homeowner vacancy rate was 1.7% and the rental vacancy rate was 5.5%.

Racial composition as of the 2020 census
Race	Number	Percent
White	5,214	70.1%
Black or African American	1,050	14.1%
American Indian and Alaska Native	21	0.3%
Asian	167	2.2%
Native Hawaiian and Other Pacific Islander	8	0.1%
Some other race	286	3.8%
Two or more races	692	9.3%
Hispanic or Latino (of any race)	710	9.5%

=== 2010 census ===
The 2010 United States census counted 7,398 people, 3,156 households, and 1,938 families in the borough. The population density was 3,968.4 per square mile (1,532.2/km^{2}). There were 3,392 housing units at an average density of 1,819.5 per square mile (702.5/km^{2}). The racial makeup was 78.75% (5,826) White, 14.54% (1,076) Black or African American, 0.31% (23) Native American, 1.84% (136) Asian, 0.08% (6) Pacific Islander, 1.95% (144) from other races, and 2.53% (187) from two or more races. Hispanic or Latino people of any race were 5.37% (397) of the population.

Of the 3,156 households, 23.5% had children under the age of 18; 43.1% were married couples living together; 13.1% had a female householder with no husband present and 38.6% were non-families. Of all households, 31.5% were made up of individuals and 9.6% had someone living alone who was 65 years of age or older. The average household size was 2.34 and the average family size was 2.97.

19.5% of the population were under the age of 18, 7.4% from 18 to 24, 28.6% from 25 to 44, 31.3% from 45 to 64, and 13.2% who were 65 years of age or older. The median age was 41.0 years. For every 100 females, the population had 95.1 males. For every 100 females ages 18 and older there were 91.2 males.

The Census Bureau's 2006–2010 American Community Survey showed that (in 2010 inflation-adjusted dollars) median household income was $61,990 (with a margin of error of +/− $3,744) and the median family income was $74,265 (+/− $6,025). Males had a median income of $53,295 (+/− $6,313) versus $48,417 (+/− $6,580) for females. The per capita income for the borough was $30,361 (+/− $2,319). About 6.5% of families and 7.6% of the population were below the poverty line, including 16.0% of those under age 18 and 4.2% of those age 65 or over.

=== 2000 census ===
As of the 2000 United States census there were 7,091 people, 3,004 households, and 1,853 families residing in the borough. The population density was 3,586.9 inhabitants per square mile (1,384.9/km^{2}). There were 3,219 housing units at an average density of 1,628.3 per square mile (628.7/km^{2}). The racial makeup of the borough was 80.99% White, 14.34% African American, 0.30% Native American, 1.40% Asian, 0.04% Pacific Islander, 1.41% from other races, and 1.52% from two or more races. Hispanic or Latino people of any race were 3.23% of the population.

There were 3,004 households, out of which 26.7% had children under the age of 18 living with them, 45.1% were married couples living together, 12.5% had a female householder with no husband present, and 38.3% were non-families. 32.0% of all households were made up of individuals, and 10.1% had someone living alone who was 65 years of age or older. The average household size was 2.36 and the average family size was 3.02.

In the borough the population was spread out, with 22.3% under the age of 18, 6.9% from 18 to 24, 33.5% from 25 to 44, 23.7% from 45 to 64, and 13.5% who were 65 years of age or older. The median age was 38 years. For every 100 females, there were 93.2 males. For every 100 females age 18 and over, there were 87.8 males.

The median income for a household in the borough was $51,150, and the median income for a family was $57,192. Males had a median income of $42,910 versus $31,445 for females. The per capita income for the borough was $23,454. About 2.2% of families and 4.2% of the population were below the poverty line, including 7.2% of those under age 18 and 2.4% of those age 65 or over.

== Government ==
=== Local government ===
Palmyra is governed under the borough form of New Jersey municipal government, which is used in 218 municipalities (of the 564) statewide, making it the most common form of government in New Jersey. The governing body is comprised of a mayor and a borough council, with all positions elected at-large on a partisan basis as part of the November general election. A mayor is elected directly by the voters to a four-year term of office. The borough council includes six members elected to serve three-year terms on a staggered basis, with two seats coming up for election each year in a three-year cycle. The borough form of government used by Palmyra is a "weak mayor / strong council" government in which council members act as the legislative body with the mayor presiding at meetings and voting only in the event of a tie. The mayor can veto ordinances subject to an override by a two-thirds majority vote of the council. The mayor makes committee and liaison assignments for council members, and most appointments are made by the mayor with the advice and consent of the council.

As of 2025, the mayor of Palmyra Borough is Democrat Gina Ragomo Tait, whose term of office ends on December 31, 2027. Members of the Borough Council are Council President Timothy S. Howard (D, 2027), Natashia Latimore (D, 2025), John Liebe (D, 2025), Anthony Foster (D, 2026; appointed to serve an unexpired term), and Sean O'Connell (D, 2026). As of April 2025, a seat is vacant.

In February 2023, the borough council appointed Jessica O'Connor to fill the seat expiring in December 2023 that had been held by Brandon Allmond.

In April 2022, the borough council selected Natashia Latimore from a list of three names nominated by the Democratic municipal committee to fill the seat expiring in December 2022 that had been held by Farrah Jenkins until she resigned from office the precious month.

In February 2020, Laura Craig Cloud was sworn in to fill the seat expiring in December 2020 that was vacated by Gina Tait when she resigned her seat to take office as mayor the previous month. In February 2016, the borough council selected Edward Kearney from a list of three candidates nominated by the Republican municipal committee to fill the council seat expiring in December 2016 that became vacant when Michelle Arnold took office as mayor.

In October 2015, the borough council selected Bryan Norcross to fill the vacant seat expiring in December 2016 of Adam Nowicki, who had resigned from office the previous month.

Gina Ragomo Tait was appointed in February 2013 to serve until the November general election, filling the seat of Council President Kenneth Brahl, who had resigned during the previous month due to work and education obligations.

=== Federal, state and county representation ===
Palmyra is located in the 1st Congressional District and is part of New Jersey's 7th state legislative district.

For the 119th United States Congress, New Jersey's 1st congressional district is represented by Donald Norcross (D, Camden). New Jersey is represented in the United States Senate by Democrats Cory Booker (Newark, term ends 2027) and Andy Kim (Moorestown, term ends 2031).

For the 2026–2027 session, the 7th legislative district of the New Jersey Legislature is represented in the State Senate by Troy Singleton (D, Palmyra) and in the General Assembly by Carol A. Murphy (D, Mount Laurel) and Balvir Singh (D, Burlington Township).

Burlington County is governed by a Board of County Commissioners comprised of five members who are chosen at-large in partisan elections to serve three-year terms of office on a staggered basis, with either one or two seats coming up for election each year; at an annual reorganization meeting, the board selects a director and deputy director from among its members to serve a one-year term. As of 2026, Burlington County's Commissioners are: Director Felicia Hopson (D, Willingboro Township, term as commissioner ends December 31, 2027; term as director ends 2026), Deputy Director Allison Eckel (D, Medford, term as commissioner ends 2028; term as deputy director ends 2026), Randy Brolo (D, Lumberton, 2026; elected to an unexpired term), Tyler Burrell (D, Delran Township, 2027) and Tom Pullion (D, Edgewater Park, 2026).

Burlington County's constitutional officers are Clerk Joanne Schwartz (D, Southampton Township, 2028), Sheriff James H. Kostoplis (D, Bordentown, 2028) and Surrogate Brian J. Carlin (D, Burlington Township, 2026).

=== Politics ===
United States presidential election results for Palmyra 2024 2020 2016 2012 2008 2004
Year	Republican		Democratic		Third party(ies)	
Year	No.	%	No.	%	No.	%
2024	1,162	34.82%	2,144	64.25%	31	0.93%
2020	1,406	33.56%	2,729	65.13%	55	1.31%
2016	1,279	35.49%	2,189	60.74%	136	3.77%
2012	1,287	35.26%	2,308	63.23%	55	1.51%
2008	1,358	35.26%	2,429	63.07%	64	1.66%
2004	1,448	39.98%	2,138	59.03%	36	0.99%

As of March 2011, there were a total of 4,736 registered voters in Palmyra, of which 1,864 (39.4% vs. 33.3% countywide) were registered as Democrats, 972 (20.5% vs. 23.9%) were registered as Republicans and 1,892 (39.9% vs. 42.8%) were registered as Unaffiliated. There were 8 voters registered as Libertarians or Greens. Among the borough's 2010 Census population, 64.0% (vs. 61.7% in Burlington County) were registered to vote, including 79.6% of those ages 18 and over (vs. 80.3% countywide).

In the 2012 presidential election, Democrat Barack Obama received 2,308 votes here (62.7% vs. 58.1% countywide), ahead of Republican Mitt Romney with 1,287 votes (35.0% vs. 40.2%) and other candidates with 55 votes (1.5% vs. 1.0%), among the 3,679 ballots cast by the borough's 4,939 registered voters, for a turnout of 74.5% (vs. 74.5% in Burlington County). In the 2008 presidential election, Democrat Barack Obama received 2,429 votes here (62.5% vs. 58.4% countywide), ahead of Republican John McCain with 1,358 votes (35.0% vs. 39.9%) and other candidates with 64 votes (1.6% vs. 1.0%), among the 3,884 ballots cast by the borough's 4,790 registered voters, for a turnout of 81.1% (vs. 80.0% in Burlington County). In the 2004 presidential election, Democrat John Kerry received 2,138 votes here (58.3% vs. 52.9% countywide), ahead of Republican George W. Bush with 1,448 votes (39.5% vs. 46.0%) and other candidates with 36 votes (1.0% vs. 0.8%), among the 3,667 ballots cast by the borough's 4,770 registered voters, for a turnout of 76.9% (vs. 78.8% in the whole county).

Gubernatorial election results for Palmyra
Year	Republican		Democratic		Third party(ies)	
Year	No.	%	No.	%	No.	%
2025	993	32.90%	1,998	66.20%	27	0.89%
2021	924	38.95%	1,433	60.41%	15	0.63%
2017	724	34.44%	1,329	63.23%	49	2.33%
2013	1,327	59.06%	879	39.12%	41	1.82%
2009	969	42.15%	1,166	50.72%	164	7.13%
2005	844	37.26%	1,314	58.01%	107	4.72%

In the 2013 gubernatorial election, Republican Chris Christie received 1,327 votes here (57.6% vs. 61.4% countywide), ahead of Democrat Barbara Buono with 879 votes (38.2% vs. 35.8%) and other candidates with 41 votes (1.8% vs. 1.2%), among the 2,304 ballots cast by the borough's 4,902 registered voters, yielding a 47.0% turnout (vs. 44.5% in the county). In the 2009 gubernatorial election, Democrat Jon Corzine received 1,166 ballots cast (50.2% vs. 44.5% countywide), ahead of Republican Chris Christie with 969 votes (41.7% vs. 47.7%), Independent Chris Daggett with 132 votes (5.7% vs. 4.8%) and other candidates with 32 votes (1.4% vs. 1.2%), among the 2,321 ballots cast by the borough's 4,859 registered voters, yielding a 47.8% turnout (vs. 44.9% in the county).

United States Senate election results for Palmyra1
Year	Republican		Democratic		Third party(ies)	
Year	No.	%	No.	%	No.	%
2024	1,015	31.52%	2,135	66.30%	70	2.17%
2018	1,135	36.85%	1,746	56.69%	199	6.46%
2012	1,181	34.11%	2,234	64.53%	47	1.36%
2006	884	39.50%	1,299	58.04%	55	2.46%

United States Senate election results for Palmyra2
Year	Republican		Democratic		Third party(ies)	
Year	No.	%	No.	%	No.	%
2020	1,391	33.84%	2,670	64.95%	50	1.22%
2014	791	38.14%	1,240	59.79%	43	2.07%
2013	512	40.41%	738	58.25%	17	1.34%
2008	1,221	35.00%	2,171	62.22%	97	2.78%

== Education ==
The Palmyra Public Schools district serves students in pre-kindergarten through twelfth grade from Palmyra, along with those from Beverly and Riverton who attend the district's high school as part of sending/receiving relationships. Students from Beverly and Riverton attend the district's high school as part of sending/receiving relationships with both districts. As of the 2023–24 school year, the district, comprised of four schools, had an enrollment of 1,083 students and 90.8 classroom teachers (on an FTE basis), for a student–teacher ratio of 11.9:1. Schools in the district (with 2023–24 enrollment from the National Center for Education Statistics) are Palmyra Preschool with 56 students in PreK Charles Street Elementary School with 394 students in grades PreK–5 and Palmyra High and Middle School with 182 students in grades 6–8 and 407 in 9–12.

Students from Palmyra, and from all of Burlington County, are eligible to attend the Burlington County Institute of Technology, a countywide public school district that serves the vocational and technical education needs of students at the high school and post-secondary level at its campuses in Medford and Westampton.

== Transportation ==
=== Roads and highways ===
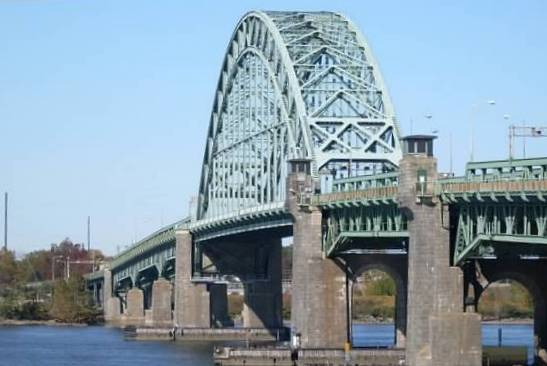
View of Tacony-Palmyra Bridge between Palmyra, NJ and Philadelphia, PA

As of May 2010, the borough had a total of 27.67 miles (44.53 km) of roadways, of which 23.04 miles (37.08 km) were maintained by the municipality, 3.11 miles (5.01 km) by Burlington County, 0.98 miles (1.58 km) by the New Jersey Department of Transportation and 0.54 miles (0.87 km) by the Burlington County Bridge Commission.

Route 73 traverses the borough, connecting to the Burlington County Bridge Commission-operated Tacony-Palmyra Bridge at the roadway's northern terminus and interchanging with County Route 543, most of which is called Broad Street within Palmyra.

=== Public transportation ===
The Palmyra station on NJ Transit's River Line light rail system is located on East Broad Street. The station opened on March 15, 2004. Southbound service from the station is available to Camden, including a transfer to the PATCO Speedline available at the Walter Rand Transportation Center. Northbound service is available to the Trenton Rail Station with connections to NJ Transit trains to New York City, SEPTA trains to Philadelphia, and Amtrak trains.

NJ Transit provides bus service in the borough on the 419 route that runs between Camden and Burlington.

== Notable people ==
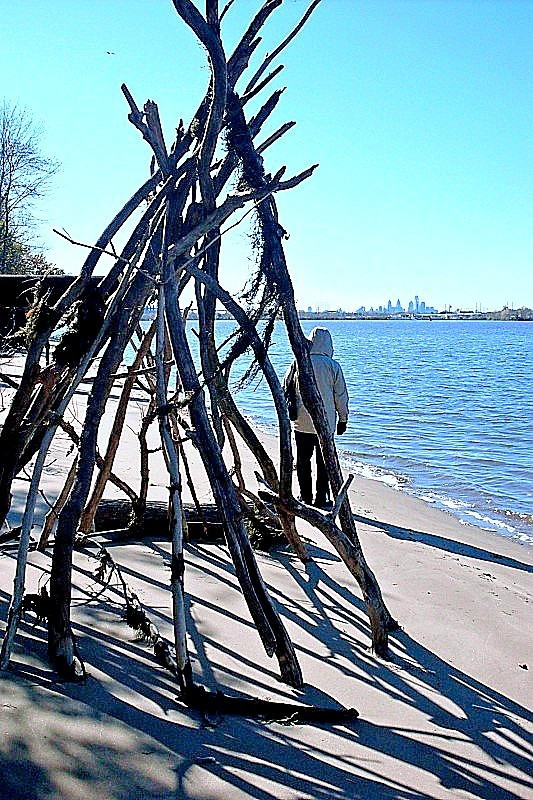
Driftwood along the banks of the Delaware River in Palmyra Nature Cove in Palmyra

People who were born in, residents of, or otherwise closely associated with Palmyra include:

- Jim Bailey (1949–2015), singer, film, television and stage actor, and female impersonator
- Lena Blackburne (1886–1968), major league baseball player and manager best known for his discovery of a mud in a tributary of the Delaware River near Palmyra which is still used to rub down baseballs, allowing pitchers to gain better control over the ball
- Jack Casey (1935–2019), member of the New Jersey Senate and General Assembly, who also served as mayor of Palmyra
- Deron Cherry (born 1959), former free safety for the Kansas City Chiefs
- Robert K. Crane (1919–2010), biochemist best known for his discovery of sodium-glucose cotransport
- Calvin T. Durgin (1893–1965), Vice Admiral who served in the U.S. Navy from 1916 until 1951, and was Deputy Chief of Naval Operations for Air in 1949
- Kelvin Harmon (born 1997), wide receiver for the Washington Commanders of the NFL
- Clarence B. Jones (born 1931), lawyer and former personal counsel, advisor, draft speech writer and close friend of Martin Luther King Jr. With Stanley Levison, Jones co-authored the I Have Dream speech.
- Frank A. Mathews Jr. (1904–1964), represented New Jersey's 4th congressional district in the United States House of Representatives from 1945 to 1949
- Quron Pratt (born 1991), former Philadelphia Eagles wide receiver
- A. Raymond Randolph (born 1943), federal judge on the United States Court of Appeals for the District of Columbia Circuit who was appointed to the court in 1990
- Justin Sherin (born 1981), playwright, screenwriter and political analyst
- Troy Singleton (born 1973), member of the New Jersey General Assembly since 2011
- Augustus Weikman, first-class barber on and survivor of the Titanic shipwreck; in the early 20th century Weikman was one of the largest landowners in Palmyra.

Preceded by Riverton	Bordering communities of Philadelphia	Succeeded by Pennsauken Township; Camden County
