= Palmira Pedro Francisco =

Mozambican politician, sports official, and activist

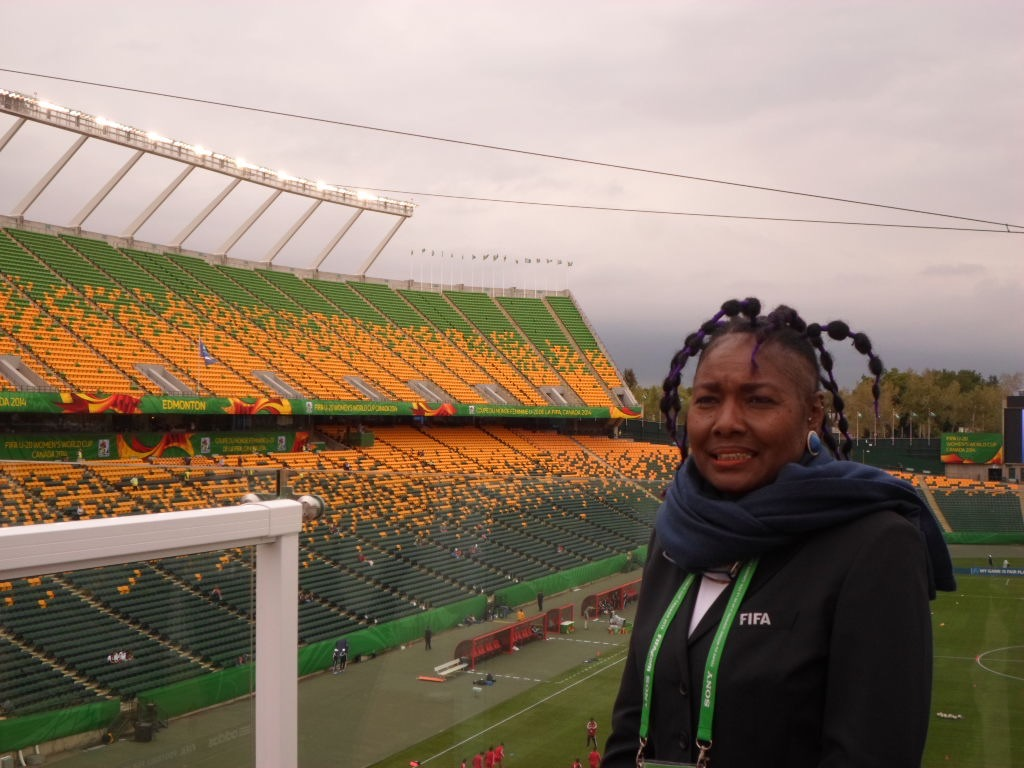
Francisco at Commonwealth Stadium during the 2014 FIFA U-20 Women's World Cup

Palmira Pedro Francisco is a Mozambican politician, sports official, and activist. She served as a member of the Assembly of the Republic of Mozambique from 1994 to 2009, representing Zambezia Province for the FRELIMO party. She has been recognized for her role in promoting women's football in Mozambique and for her involvement in international sports institutions.

== Biography ==
Palmira was born in Nacala, in northern Mozambique. The daughter of a nurse, she moved frequently across the country and completed secondary school in Nampula and Nacala. She joined FRELIMO in 1981, having started her political activism in the Mozambican Youth Organization (OJM) and the Mozambican Women's Organization (OMM) during the 1970s.

== Political career ==
Francisco was elected to Parliament in the 1994 legislative elections and served until 2009. She served on the parliamentary committees for Economic Activities and Services, as well as those for Sports, Gender, Social, and Environmental Affairs.

== Work in sports ==
From 1997 to 2012, she was the first president of the Women's Football Commission of the Mozambican Football Federation. From 2002 to 2021, she chaired the Sports and Environment Commission of the Mozambican Olympic Committee, and since 2021 she has led its Women and Sport Commission, also serving on its Executive Board.

Francisco was the first Mozambican woman to serve on the Women's Football Committee of the Confederation of African Football (CAF) and was also a member of the CAF Committee on Event Management and Protocol from 2010 to 2018. Between 2012 and 2016, she represented Mozambique on FIFA's U-20 Women's World Cup Organizing Committee.

Since 2002, she has served as a CAF and FIFA Match Commissioner in competitions including FIFA Women's World Cup qualifiers.

In 2023, she took part in the 3rd Conference of the Women in Sport Movement (MODESP), which addressed issues such as harassment and gender equality in Mozambican sport.

== Recognitions ==
In 2019, she was honored at the first National Sports Gala, organized by the Secretariat of State for Sports, for her contributions to the development of sport in Mozambique.

== Social activism ==
Since 2016, Francisco has served as an ambassador for World Vision Mozambique, promoting child welfare and campaigning against early marriage.
