= Quron Pratt =

American football player (born 1991)

No. 10
- Position: Wide receiver

Personal information
- Born: April 25, 1991 (age 35); Palmyra, New Jersey, U.S.
- Listed height: 6 ft 0 in (1.83 m)
- Listed weight: 195 lb (88 kg)

Career information
- High school: Palmyra (NJ)
- College: Rutgers
- NFL draft: 2014: undrafted

Career history
- Philadelphia Eagles (2014–2015)*
- * Offseason or practice squad member only
- Stats at Pro Football Reference

Quron Xavier Pratt (born April 25, 1991) is an American former football wide receiver. He was an undrafted free agent by the Eagles in 2014. He played college football at Rutgers.

== College career ==
Pratt was named the Rutgers' team MVP in 2013, and appeared in all 13 games (9 starts) as a senior. He tallied 516 yards on 32 catches also adding a blocked punt and a 99-yard kickoff return for a touchdown against Eastern Michigan. He was a 3x conference all-academic honoree and also was a semifinalist for the National Football Foundation Campbell Trophy. In his collegiate career, he appeared in 48 games (15 starts) while recording 87 catches for 1,087 yards and one touchdown.

== Professional career ==
Quron was signed by the Eagles on May 13, 2014 as an undrafted free agent. On September 4, 2015, Pratt was cut in the last round of preseason cuts. He was added to the practice squad two days later. Pratt was released from the Eagles practice squad on September 22, 2015 and signed quarterback Stephen Morris who was released from the Eagles roster so they could sign 27-year-old veteran Thad Lewis.

== Personal life ==
He is the son of Merrill and Robin Pratt. Has a twin sister, Javon, and an older sister, Lailah. While at Rutgers he doubled majored in labor studies and sociology.
