= Kevin Graf =

American football player (born 1991)

No. 77
- Position: Offensive tackle

Personal information
- Born: June 17, 1991 (age 35); Agoura Hills, California, U.S.
- Listed height: 6 ft 6 in (1.98 m)
- Listed weight: 309 lb (140 kg)

Career information
- High school: Agoura Hills (CA) Agoura
- College: USC
- NFL draft: 2014: undrafted

Career history
- Philadelphia Eagles (2014); Indianapolis Colts (2016)*; Atlanta Falcons (2016)
- * Offseason or practice squad member only
- Stats at Pro Football Reference

Kevin Graf (born June 17, 1991) is an American former football offensive tackle. He was signed by the Philadelphia Eagles as an undrafted free agent in 2014. He played college football at USC.

== College career ==
Graf played one season of football at Oaks Christian High School He played both Basketball and Football at Agoura High School. He graduated with a degree in communications and a minor in occupational therapy from the University of Southern California.

He started 39 games at right tackle for the Trojans in his sophomore year, receiving an honorable mention to the 2011 CollegeFootballNews.com sophomore team. He played 14 games as a senior, and received an honorable mention for All-Pac-12 Conference honors.

== Professional career ==
=== Philadelphia Eagles ===
Graf was signed by the Eagles on May 13, 2014 as an undrafted free agent. He played with the club for several weeks before being relegated to the practice squad. He was released by the Eagles on August 30, 2015.

=== Indianapolis Colts ===
On April 20, 2016, Graf signed with the Indianapolis Colts. On August 26, 2016, Graf was released from the Colts' injured reserve with an injury settlement.

=== Atlanta Falcons ===
On November 29, 2016, Graf was signed to the Atlanta Falcons' practice squad. He was promoted to the active roster on December 6, 2016. He was released on December 12, 2016 and re-signed back to the practice squad. He signed a reserve/future contract with the Falcons on February 7, 2017. He was waived on August 30, 2017.

== Personal life ==
Kevin is the son of Allan and Betty Graf. He has two siblings, a brother named Derek and a sister named Nicole. His father and brother both played for USC. His father was part of the 1972 National Championship team. He graduated from Agoura High School in 2009. Graf is married to Samantha Hansen, daughter of LA Angels hitting coach and former MLB infielder Dave Hansen.
