= SS Palmyra =

A number of steamships have been named Palmyra, including:

- SS Palmyra (1944), a Bock, Godeffroy & Co cargo ship in service 1957–62
- SS Palmyra (Flensburger, 1944), a Deutsche Levant Linie cargo ship in service 1944–45
