= Palmyra offensive (July–August 2015) =

2015 military operation of the Syrian Civil War

Coordinates: 34.5600°N 38.2672°E

- Part of the Syrian Civil War
Date	8 July – 4 August 2015 (3 weeks and 6 days)
Location	Tadmur District, Eastern Homs Governorate, Syria
Result	Indecisive: The Syrian Army comes within 3–5 kilometers of Palmyra city

Belligerents
Islamic State: Wilayat Homs	(Syria) Syrian Arab Republic: Syrian Armed Forces; National Defense Force; Syrian Arab Air Force; Hezbollah; Lions of Hussein Brigade

Commanders and leaders
Abu Laith al-Saoudy	(Syria) Talal al-Barazi (Governor of the Homs Governorate)

Units involved
Military of ISIS	18th Armored Division; Suqur al-Sahara

Strength
1,800–2,000+ (Palmyra city)	Unknown

Casualties and losses
30 killed and wounded (SOHR claim); 89 killed (Army claim)	12 killed (SOHR claim) 2 soldiers executed on video
- 21 civilians killed

The Palmyra offensive of July–August 2015 was a military operation launched during the Syrian Civil War by the Syrian Arab Army in July 2015, in an attempt to recapture the ISIL-held city of Tadmur, known in English as Palmyra.

== Background ==
In late May 2015, ISIL forces captured Palmyra and the surrounding countryside after a large-scale offensive.

Between 15 and 22 June, the Syrian Army recaptured the Jazal oil field, and reopened a transport route from the field towards Syrian government-held cities. The advance placed the Syrian Army 10 kilometers west of Palmyra; however, this was not the start of a large-scale offensive to retake the city. ISIL destroyed, by mining, some of the ruins of ancient Palmyra which are a UNESCO World Heritage Site.

== The offensive ==
On 8 July 2015, the Syrian Arab Army and National Defense Forces, supported by the Syrian Arab Air Force, began an offensive towards Palmyra and by the next day made advances, positioning themselves 4–5 kilometers from the city. The military seized around a 15 km area, west of Palmyra, and some of the locations they had reportedly captured over the previous 24 hours was Nuzl Hayal and the Tel al Marmala, about 10 km from Palmyra's city center.

Syrian government forces made further advances 11 July, as the death toll since the start of the offensive reached at least 30 ISIL fighters and 12 soldiers.

On 13 July, the Syrian Army's special forces unit, the Tiger Forces, captured the Ancient Quarries in the northwestern countryside of Palmyra after fierce clashes with ISIL. According to a Syrian Army source, Syrian Arab Army (SAA) units were less than 2 km from the Qassoun Checkpoint, leading to the Qassoun Mountains of Palmyra. Two days later, the SAA and National Defence Forces (NDF) reportedly managed to capture Al-Meshtal and Qasr Al-Hayr south of Tiyas Military Airbase. Over 15 and 16 July, fighting between ISIL and the Tiger Forces moved to the southeast of the Ancient Quarries, while the Syrian Army also reportedly advanced into the Wadi Al-Abyad (White Valley).

Fighting in the Palmyra countryside continued into 20 and 22 July. On 24 July, the SAA resumed operations towards the southern perimeter of the Ancient Quarries. On 26 July, Syrian government troops advanced, capturing some strategic hills that would allow them to survey ISIL forces inside of Palmyra City. On 27 July, the SAA and Hezbollah reportedly captured Palmyra Castle, after a three-hour gunfight. As a result, Syrian government forces were now a mere three kilometers from the ancient city. Footage also showed approximately 300 ISIL combatants fleeing in the direction of their capital Raqqa. On 1 August, SOHR reported that the Syrian Arab Air Force (SAAF) was still bombing Palmyra.

On 4 August, ISIL launched a counter-offensive, recapturing the territory north of the Ancient Quarries and south of the Jazal Mountains. However, the SAA managed to repel the ISIL assault and to recapture most of the lost territory.

== Aftermath ==
In March 2016, the Syrian Army, supported by the Russian Air Force, launched a new offensive with the aim of capturing Palmyra which turned out a success.

== See also ==
- Syrian Kurdish–Islamist conflict (2013–present)
