= List of 2015 NFL draft early entrants =

This list of 2015 NFL draft early entrants consists of college football players who forfeited remaining collegiate eligibility and were declared by the National Football League (NFL) as eligible to be selected in the 2015 NFL draft. This includes juniors and redshirt sophomores who completed high school at least three years prior to the draft. A player that meets these requirements can renounce his remaining NCAA eligibility and enter the draft. Players had until January 15, 2015, to declare their intention to forgo their remaining collegiate eligibility.

In addition to the 74 underclassmen, ten players who had already received degrees opted not to pursue an additional season of college eligibility for which they may have been eligible. These players are included in the list below, bringing the total number of players entering the draft with eligibility remaining to 84.

== Complete list of players ==
The following players were granted special eligibility to enter the 2015 draft:

= Sophomore	= Graduate

Name	Position	School	Drafted by	Draft pos.
Nelson Agholor	WR	USC	Philadelphia Eagles	20
Jay Ajayi	RB	Boise State	Miami Dolphins	149
Kwon Alexander	LB	LSU	Tampa Bay Buccaneers	124
Javorius Allen	RB	USC	Baltimore Ravens	125
Arik Armstead	DE	Oregon	San Francisco 49ers	17
Deion Barnes	DE	Penn State	—	—
Malcom Brown	DT	Texas	New England Patriots	32
Alex Carter	CB	Stanford	Detroit Lions	80
B. J. Catalon	RB	TCU	—	—
Sammie Coates	WR	Auburn	Pittsburgh Steelers	87
Tevin Coleman	RB	Indiana	Atlanta Falcons	73
Jalen Collins	CB	LSU	Atlanta Falcons	42
Landon Collins	S	Alabama	New York Giants	33
Amari Cooper	WR	Alabama	Oakland Raiders	4
Xavier Cooper	DT	Washington State	Cleveland Browns	96
Christian Covington	DT	Rice	Houston Texans	216
DaVaris Daniels	WR	Notre Dame	—	—
Ronald Darby	CB	Florida State	Buffalo Bills	50
Mike Davis	RB	South Carolina	San Francisco 49ers	126
Stefon Diggs	WR	Maryland	Minnesota Vikings	146
Zach D'Orazio	WR	Akron	—	—
Lorenzo Doss	CB	Tulane	Denver Broncos	164
Mario Edwards	DE	Florida State	Oakland Raiders	35
Durell Eskridge	S	Syracuse	—	—
George Farmer	WR	USC	—	—
Max Flores	LB	Northern Colorado	—	—
Ereck Flowers	OT	Miami	New York Giants	9
Dante Fowler	DE/OLB	Florida	Jacksonville Jaguars	3
Devin Funchess	WR	Michigan	Carolina Panthers	41
Charles Gaines	CB	Louisville	Cleveland Browns	189
Jacoby Glenn	DB	UCF	—	—
Eddie Goldman	DT	Florida State	Chicago Bears	39
Melvin Gordon	RB	Wisconsin	San Diego Chargers	15
Dorial Green-Beckham	WR	Missouri	Tennessee Titans	40
Deontay Greenberry	WR	Houston	—	—
Randy Gregory	DE	Nebraska	Dallas Cowboys	60
Todd Gurley	RB	Georgia	St. Louis Rams	10
Chris Hackett	S	TCU	—	—
Eli Harold	DE	Virginia	San Francisco 49ers	79
Chris Harper	WR	California	—	—
Dee Hart	RB	Colorado State	—	—
Braylon Heard	RB	Kentucky	—	—
Gerod Holliman	S	Louisville	Pittsburgh Steelers	239
D. J. Humphries	OT	Florida	Arizona Cardinals	24
Brett Hundley	QB	UCLA	Green Bay Packers	147
Danielle Hunter	DE	LSU	Minnesota Vikings	88
David Irving	DT	Iowa State	—	—
Jesse James	TE	Penn State	Pittsburgh Steelers	160
Duke Johnson	RB	Miami	Cleveland Browns	77
Matt Jones	RB	Florida	Washington Redskins	95
Nigel King	WR	Kansas	—	—
Tyler Kroft	TE	Rutgers	Cincinnati Bengals	85
Marcus Mariota	QB	Oregon	Tennessee Titans	2
Ellis McCarthy	DT	UCLA	—	—
Benardrick McKinney	LB	Mississippi State	Houston Texans	43
Patrick Miller	OT	Auburn	—	—
Tyler Moore	G	Florida	—	—
Rakeem Nuñez-Roches	DT	Southern Miss	Kansas City Chiefs	217
Andrus Peat	OT	Stanford	New Orleans Saints	13
Breshad Perriman	WR	UCF	Baltimore Ravens	26
Marcus Peters	CB	Washington	Kansas City Chiefs	18
Jordan Phillips	DT	Oklahoma	Miami Dolphins	52
Darius Philon	DT	Arkansas	San Diego Chargers	192
Bradley Pinion	P	Clemson	San Francisco 49ers	165
Jaquel Pitts	WR	Trinity	—	—
Jeremiah Poutasi	OT	Utah	Tennessee Titans	66
Darien Rankin	LB	North Carolina	—	—
Shane Ray	DE	Missouri	Denver Broncos	23
Josh Robinson	RB	Mississippi State	Indianapolis Colts	205
James Sample	S	Louisville	Jacksonville Jaguars	104
Jean Sifrin	TE	Massachusetts	—	—
Donovan Smith	OT	Penn State	Tampa Bay Buccaneers	34
Jaelen Strong	WR	Arizona State	Houston Texans	70
Tacoi Sumler	WR	Appalachian State	—	—
Shaq Thompson	LB	Washington	Carolina Panthers	25
Max Valles	LB	Virginia	Oakland Raiders	179
Easton Wahlstrom	LS	Arizona State	—	—
Trae Waynes	CB	Michigan State	Minnesota Vikings	11
Leonard Williams	DE	USC	New York Jets	6
Maxx Williams	TE	Minnesota	Baltimore Ravens	55
P. J. Williams	CB	Florida State	New Orleans Saints	78
Trey Williams	RB	Texas A&M	—	—
Jameis Winston	QB	Florida State	Tampa Bay Buccaneers	1
T. J. Yeldon	RB	Alabama	Jacksonville Jaguars	36

== Number of players granted special eligibility by year ==
Undergraduates admitted to the NFL draft each year:

Year	Number
2015	74
2014	98
2013	73
2012	65
2011	56
2010	53
2009	46
2008	53
2007	40
2006	52
2005	51
