= List of 2014 NFL draft early entrants =

This list of 2014 NFL draft early entrants consists of college football players who forfeited remaining collegiate eligibility and were declared by the National Football League (NFL) as eligible to be selected in the 2014 NFL draft. This includes juniors and redshirt sophomores who completed high school at least three years prior to the draft. A player that meets these requirements can renounce his remaining NCAA eligibility and enter the draft. Players had until January 15, 2014, to declare their intention to forgo their remaining collegiate eligibility. A total of 98 underclassmen were granted eligibility for the 2014 draft, eclipsing the previous record from 2013 of 73.

In addition to the 98 underclassmen, at least four players who had already received degrees opted not to pursue an additional season of college eligibility for which they may have been eligible: Dion Bailey, Carl Bradford, Teddy Bridgewater and Adrian Hubbard. These players are included in the list below, bringing the total number of players entering the draft with eligibility remaining to 102.

Fourteen underclassmen – plus Teddy Bridgewater who graduated with eligibility remaining – were selected in the draft's first round. Sixty-two of ninety-eight underclassmen (63.3%) – 64 of 102 (62.7%) if the graduates are included – were selected in the draft.

== Complete list of players ==
The following players were granted special eligibility to enter the 2014 draft:

= Sophomore	= Graduate

Name	Position	School	Drafted by	Draft pos.
Davante Adams	WR	Fresno State	Green Bay Packers	53
Nick Addison	DB	Bethune-Cookman	—	—
Jace Amaro	TE	Texas Tech	New York Jets	49
George Atkinson III	RB	Notre Dame	—	—
Dion Bailey	S	USC	—	—
Odell Beckham Jr.	WR	LSU	New York Giants	12
Kelvin Benjamin	WR	Florida State	Carolina Panthers	28
Kapri Bibbs	RB	Colorado State	—	—
Brendan Bigelow	RB	California	—	—
Alfred Blue	RB	LSU	Houston Texans	181
Russell Bodine	C	North Carolina	Cincinnati Bengals	111
Blake Bortles	QB	Central Florida	Jacksonville Jaguars	3
Chris Boyd	WR	Vanderbilt	—	—
Carl Bradford	OLB	Arizona State	Green Bay Packers	121
Bashaud Breeland	S	Clemson	Washington Redskins	102
Teddy Bridgewater	QB	Louisville	Minnesota Vikings	32
Martavis Bryant	WR	Clemson	Pittsburgh Steelers	118
Ka'Deem Carey	RB	Arizona	Chicago Bears	117
Ha Ha Clinton-Dix	S	Alabama	Green Bay Packers	21
Jadeveon Clowney	DE	South Carolina	Houston Texans	1
Brandon Coleman	WR	Rutgers	—	—
Brandin Cooks	WR	Oregon State	New Orleans Saints	20
Scott Crichton	DE	Oregon State	Minnesota Vikings	72
Isaiah Crowell	RB	Alabama State	—	—
Jonathan Dowling	S	Western Kentucky	Oakland Raiders	247
Kony Ealy	DE	Missouri	Carolina Panthers	60
Eric Ebron	TE	North Carolina	Detroit Lions	10
Bruce Ellington	WR	South Carolina	San Francisco 49ers	106
Mike Evans	WR	Texas A&M	Tampa Bay Buccaneers	7
Ego Ferguson	DT	LSU	Chicago Bears	51
Cameron Fleming	OT	Stanford	New England Patriots	140
Khairi Fortt	LB	California	New Orleans Saints	126
Austin Franklin	WR	New Mexico State	—	—
Devonta Freeman	RB	Florida State	Atlanta Falcons	103
Carlos Gray	DT	North Carolina State	—	—
Xavier Grimble	TE	USC	—	—
Terrance Hackney	T	Bethune-Cookman	—	—
Victor Hampton	CB	South Carolina	—	—
Jeremy Hill	RB	LSU	Cincinnati Bengals	55
Adrian Hubbard	DE	Alabama	—	—
Kameron Jackson	CB	California	—	—
Nic Jacobs	TE	McNeese State	—	—
Timmy Jernigan	DT	Florida State	Baltimore Ravens	48
Anthony Johnson	DT	LSU	—	—
Jamel Johnson	WR	Alabama State	—	—
Storm Johnson	RB	Central Florida	Jacksonville Jaguars	222
Henry Josey	RB	Missouri	—	—
Cyrus Kouandjio	OT	Alabama	Buffalo Bills	44
Jarvis Landry	WR	LSU	Miami Dolphins	63
Cody Latimer	WR	Indiana	Denver Broncos	56
DeMarcus Lawrence	DE	Boise State	Dallas Cowboys	34
Marqise Lee	WR	USC	Jacksonville Jaguars	39
A. C. Leonard	TE	Tennessee State	—	—
Albert Louis-Jean	DB	Boston College	—	—
Colt Lyerla	TE	Oregon	—	—
Aaron Lynch	DE	USF	San Francisco 49ers	150
Johnny Manziel	QB	Texas A&M	Cleveland Browns	22
Marcus Martin	G/C	USC	San Francisco 49ers	70
Tre Mason	RB	Auburn	St. Louis Rams	75
Chris McCain	DE	California	—	—
Terrance Mitchell	CB	Oregon	Dallas Cowboys	254
Viliami Moala	DT	California	—	—
Donte Moncrief	WR	Mississippi	Indianapolis Colts	90
Adam Muema	RB	San Diego State	—	—
Jake Murphy	TE	Utah	—	—
Troy Niklas	TE	Notre Dame	Arizona Cardinals	52
Louis Nix	DT	Notre Dame	Houston Texans	83
Jeoffrey Pagan	DT	Alabama	Houston Texans	177
Ronald Powell	DE	Florida	New Orleans Saints	169
Calvin Pryor	S	Louisville	New York Jets	18
Loucheiz Purifoy	CB	Florida	—	—
Kelcy Quarles	DT	South Carolina	—	—
Darrin Reaves	RB	Alabama-Birmingham	—	—
Ed Reynolds	S	Stanford	Philadelphia Eagles	162
Antonio Richardson	OT	Tennessee	—	—
Paul Richardson	WR	Colorado	Seattle Seahawks	45
Marcus Roberson	CB	Florida	—	—
Allen Robinson	WR	Penn State	Jacksonville Jaguars	61
Greg Robinson	OT	Auburn	St. Louis Rams	2
Bradley Roby	CB	Ohio State	Denver Broncos	31
Richard Rodgers	TE	California	Green Bay Packers	98
Bishop Sankey	RB	Washington	Tennessee Titans	54
Lache Seastrunk	RB	Baylor	Washington Redskins	186
Austin Seferian-Jenkins	TE	Washington	Tampa Bay Buccaneers	38
Ryan Shazier	LB	Ohio State	Pittsburgh Steelers	15
Yawin Smallwood	ILB	Connecticut	Atlanta Falcons	253
Brett Smith	QB	Wyoming	—	—
Jerome Smith	RB	Syracuse	—	—
Willie Snead	WR	Ball State	—	—
John Spooney	HB	Brown	—	—
Josh Stewart	WR	Oklahoma State	—	—
Xavier Su'a-Filo	OG	UCLA	Houston Texans	33
Vinnie Sunseri	S	Alabama	New Orleans Saints	167
De'Anthony Thomas	RB	Oregon	Kansas City Chiefs	124
Stephon Tuitt	DE	Notre Dame	Pittsburgh Steelers	46
Trai Turner	OG	LSU	Carolina Panthers	92
George Uko	DT	USC	—	—
Pierre Warren	S	Jacksonville State	—	—
Sammy Watkins	WR	Clemson	Buffalo Bills	4
Terrance West	RB	Towson	Cleveland Browns	94
James Wilder, Jr.	RB	Florida State	—	—
David Yankey	OT/G	Stanford	Minnesota Vikings	145

== Number of players granted special eligibility by year ==
Undergraduates admitted to the NFL draft each year:

Year	Number
2014	98
2013	73
2012	65
2011	56
2010	53
2009	46
2008	53
2007	40
2006	52
2005	51
