= List of 2013 NFL draft early entrants =

This list of 2013 NFL draft early entrants consists of college football players who were juniors or redshirt sophomores and were accepted by the National Football League (NFL) as eligible to be selected in the 2013 NFL draft. A college football player who completed high school at least three years prior can renounce his remaining NCAA eligibility and enter the draft. Players who met these requirements had until January 15, 2013, to declare their intention to forgo their remaining collegiate eligibility. A total of 73 underclassmen were granted eligibility for the 2013 draft, eclipsing the previous record from 2012 of 65. In addition to these underclassmen, at least six players who were considered seniors opted not to pursue an additional season of college eligibility for which they may have been eligible.

== Complete list of players ==
The following players were granted special eligibility to enter the 2013 draft:

= Sophomore	= Senior

Name	Position	School	Drafted by	Draft pos.
Keenan Allen	WR	California	San Diego	76
David Amerson	CB	NC State	Washington	51
Alvin Bailey	G	Arkansas	—	—
Stedman Bailey	WR	West Virginia	St. Louis	92
David Bakhtiari	OT	Colorado	Green Bay	109
Dwayne Beckford	LB	Purdue	—	—
Le'Veon Bell	RB	Michigan State	Pittsburgh	48
Giovani Bernard ^{[a]}	RB	North Carolina	Cincinnati	37
Josh Boyce ^{[b]}	WR	TCU	New England	102
Tyler Bray	QB	Tennessee	—	—
Terrence Brown	CB	Stanford	—	—
Duron Carter	WR	Florida Atlantic	—	—
Knile Davis	RB	Arkansas	Kansas City	96
Mike Edwards	CB	Hawaii	—	—
Matt Elam	S	Florida	Baltimore	32
Zach Ertz	TE	Stanford	Philadelphia	35
Gavin Escobar	TE	San Diego State	Dallas	47
Chris Faulk	OT	LSU	—	—
Sharrif Floyd	DT	Florida	Minnesota	23
Michael Ford	RB	LSU	—	—
Travis Frederick	C	Wisconsin	Dallas	31
Kwame Geathers	DT	Georgia	—	—
William Gholston	DE	Michigan State	Tampa Bay	126
Johnathan Hankins	DT	Ohio State	NY Giants	49
Jajuan Harley	S	Middle Tennessee	—	—
DeAndre Hopkins	WR	Clemson	Houston	27
Justin Hunter	WR	Tennessee	Tennessee	34
Jawan Jamison	RB	Rutgers	Washington	228
Stefphon Jefferson	RB	Nevada	—	—
Tony Jefferson	S	Oklahoma	—	—
Jelani Jenkins ^{[a]}	LB	Florida	Miami	104
Luke Joeckel	OT	Texas A&M	Jacksonville	2
Jarvis Jones	LB	Georgia	Pittsburgh	17
José José	DT	UCF	—	—
Brandon Kaufman ^{[b]}	WR	Eastern Washington	—	—
Joe Kruger	DE	Utah	Philadelphia	212
Eddie Lacy	RB	Alabama	Green Bay	61
Marcus Lattimore	RB	South Carolina	San Francisco	131
Corey Lemonier	DE	Auburn	San Francisco	88
Bennie Logan	DT	LSU	Philadelphia	67
Stansly Maponga	DE	TCU	Atlanta	153
Tyrann Mathieu	DB	LSU	Arizona	69
Dee Milliner	CB	Alabama	NY Jets	9
Barkevious Mingo	DE	LSU	Cleveland	6
Kevin Minter	LB	LSU	Arizona	45
Sam Montgomery	DE	LSU	Houston	95
Brandon Moore	DT	Texas	—	—
Damontre Moore	DE	Texas A&M	NY Giants	81
Alec Ogletree	LB	Georgia	St. Louis	30
Kyle Padron ^{[b]}	QB	Eastern Washington	—	—
Cordarrelle Patterson	WR	Tennessee	Minnesota	29
Justin Pugh ^{[b]}	OT	Syracuse	NY Giants	19
Bradley Randle	RB	UNLV	—	—
Joseph Randle	RB	Oklahoma State	Dallas	151
Jordan Reed	TE	Florida	Washington	85
Eric Reid	S	LSU	San Francisco	18
Greg Reid	DB	Florida State	—	—
Xavier Rhodes	CB	Florida State	Minnesota	25
Sheldon Richardson	DT	Missouri	NY Jets	13
Nickell Robey	CB	USC	—	—
Da'Rick Rogers ^{[b]}	WR	Tennessee Tech	—	—
Logan Ryan	CB	Rutgers	New England	83
Ace Sanders	WR	South Carolina	Jacksonville	101
Darrington Sentimore	DE	Tennessee	—	—
Tharold Simon	CB	LSU	Seattle	138
Dion Sims	TE	Michigan State	Miami	106
Akeem Spence	DT	Illinois	Tampa Bay	100
Kenny Stills	WR	Oklahoma	New Orleans	144
Levine Toilolo	TE	Stanford	Atlanta	133
Trabis Ward	RB	Tennessee State	—	—
Spencer Ware	RB	LSU	Seattle	194
Menelik Watson	OT	Florida State	Oakland	42
Björn Werner	DE	Florida State	Indianapolis	24
Steve Williams	CB	California	San Diego	145
Marquess Wilson	WR	Washington State	Chicago	236
Brad Wing ^{[a]}	P	LSU	—	—
Cierre Wood	RB	Notre Dame	—	—
Robert Woods	WR	USC	Buffalo	41
Tom Wort	LB	Oklahoma	—	—

Notes

^{a} This player was a third-year sophomore.
^{b} This player was not technically an underclassman, but he opted to forego a potential additional season of college eligibility.

== Number of players granted special eligibility by year ==
Undergraduates admitted to the NFL draft each year:

Year	Number
2013	73
2012	65
2011	56
2010	53
2009	46
2008	53
2007	40
2006	52
2005	51
2004	43
