= 2013 Philadelphia Eagles season =

81st season in franchise history; first under Chip Kelly

- Owner: Jeffrey Lurie
- General manager: Howie Roseman
- Head coach: Chip Kelly
- Offensive coordinator: Pat Shurmur
- Defensive coordinator: Billy Davis
- Home stadium: Lincoln Financial Field

Results
- Record: 10–6
- Division place: 1st NFC East
- Playoffs: Lost Wild Card Playoffs (vs. Saints) 24–26
- All-Pros: RB LeSean McCoy (1st team); OT Jason Peters (1st team); OG Evan Mathis (1st team)
- Pro Bowlers: QB Nick Foles; RB LeSean McCoy; WR DeSean Jackson; T Jason Peters; G Evan Mathis

Uniform
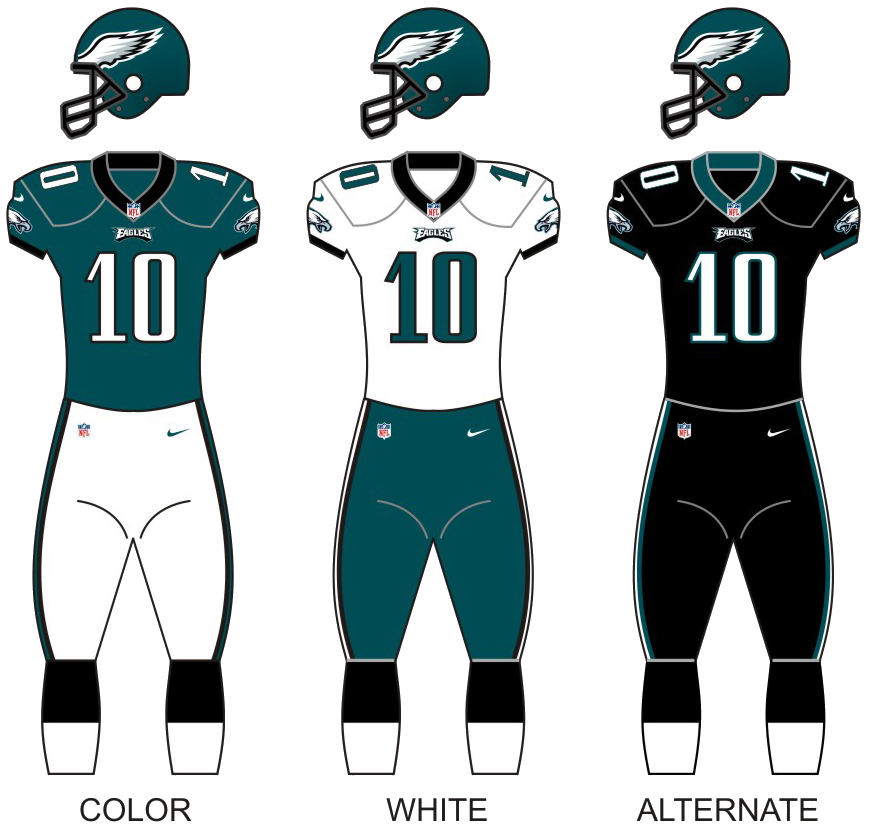

The 2013 season was the Philadelphia Eagles' 81st in the National Football League (NFL) and their first under head coach Chip Kelly. The Eagles improved on their 4–12 record from 2012, finishing 10–6 and clinching the NFC East division title and the playoffs for the first time since 2010, but after a close game, they lost on a last-second field goal to the New Orleans Saints in the Wild Card round of the playoffs, by a score of 26–24. The season was noted for LeSean McCoy winning the NFL rushing title, and the extremely successful season by Nick Foles where he produced 27 touchdowns to only 2 interceptions. Foles also threw seven touchdowns against the Oakland Raiders, tying an NFL record for most touchdowns in a single game.

This was the Eagles' first season since 1998 without long-time head coach Andy Reid, who was fired following the 2012 season, and would become the head coach of the Kansas City Chiefs after his dismissal. Reid made his first return to Philadelphia during Week 3, in which the Chiefs won 26–16.

The Eagles had a three-way quarterback competition with Nick Foles, Michael Vick and Matt Barkley, with Vick winning the job. After Vick got injured, however, Foles took over as quarterback and was eventually named the new starting quarterback despite Vick's return.

It took 62 weeks overall for the Eagles to win a home game; they continued the home losing streak that lasted throughout the rest of the 2012 season and extended it to 10 games, but they ended the streak by winning 24–16 against Washington at the Linc in Week 11.

== Personnel changes ==
On December 31, 2012, long time head coach Andy Reid was fired. On January 16, 2013, Chip Kelly was hired as the new head coach.

On January 20, Pat Shurmur accepted the offensive coordinator job. Billy Davis accepted the defensive coordinator position on February 7.

Tom Gamble was named Vice-president of Player Personnel on February 13, a position that had been vacant since Ryan Grigson left to become general manager of the Indianapolis Colts.

== Roster changes ==
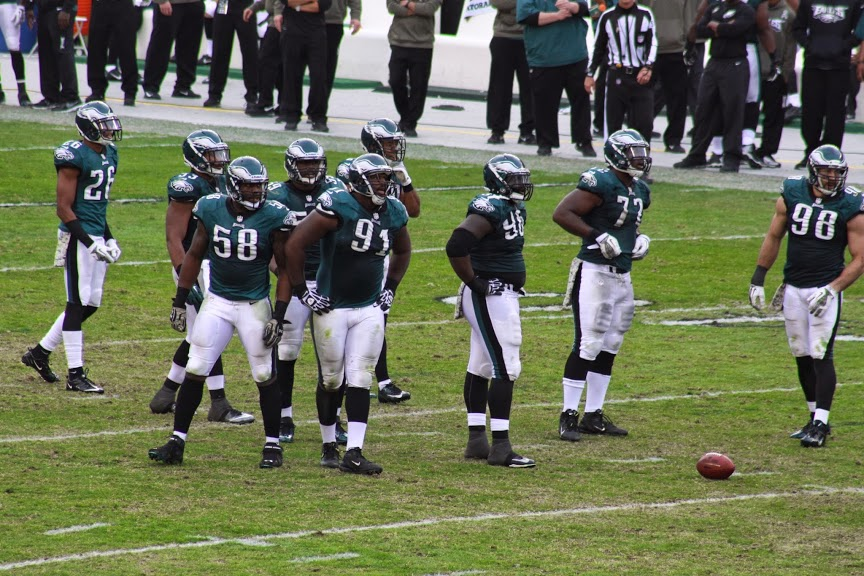
The Philadelphia Eagles defense on the field during the 2013 season.

=== Free agents ===
Position	Player	Tag	2013 Team	Notes
S	Colt Anderson	UFA	Philadelphia Eagles	
LS	Jon Dorenbos	UFA	Philadelphia Eagles	
OT	King Dunlap	UFA	San Diego Chargers	
LB	Akeem Jordan	UFA	Kansas City Chiefs	
DT	Derek Landri	UFA	Tampa Bay Buccaneers	
CB	Dominique Rodgers-Cromartie	UFA	Denver Broncos	
G	Jake Scott	UFA	Detroit Lions	
DE	Darryl Tapp	UFA	Washington Redskins	

Player re-signed by the Eagles

==== Signings ====
Position	Player	Tag	2012 Team	Date signed	Notes and references
TE	James Casey	UFA	Houston Texans	March 12	on active roster
S	Patrick Chung	UFA	New England Patriots	March 12	re-signed by New England Patriots
CB	Bradley Fletcher	UFA	St. Louis Rams	March 12	signed by New England Patriots
ILB	Jason Phillips	UFA	Carolina Panthers	March 12	on injured reserve
NT	Isaac Sopoaga	UFA	San Francisco 49ers	March 12	traded to New England
OLB	Connor Barwin	UFA	Houston Texans	March 14	on active roster
S	Kenny Phillips	UFA	New York Giants	March 14	waived
CB	Cary Williams	UFA	Baltimore Ravens	March 14	signed by Seattle Seahawks
P	Donnie Jones	UFA	Houston Texans	March 25	on active roster
RB	Felix Jones	UFA	Dallas Cowboys	May 14	traded to Pittsburgh

==== Trades ====
- On March 15, the Eagles traded their sixth round pick and a conditional 2014 pick to the Tampa Bay Buccaneers for wide receiver Arrelious Benn and the Bucs' 2013 seventh round pick.
- On March 28, the Eagles traded fullback Stanley Havili to the Indianapolis Colts in exchange for defensive end Clifton Geathers.
- On April 11, the Eagles traded running back Dion Lewis to the Cleveland Browns for linebacker Emmanuel Acho.
- On August 12, the Eagles traded offensive guard Nate Menkin to the Houston Texans for wide receiver Jeff Maehl.

== 2013 draft class ==
Round	Selection	Player	Position	College
1	4	Lane Johnson	OT	Oklahoma
2	35	Zach Ertz	TE	Stanford
3	67	Bennie Logan	DT	LSU
4	98^{[a]}	Matt Barkley	QB	USC
5	136	Earl Wolff	S	NC State
7^{[a]}	212^{[b]}	Joe Kruger	DE	Utah
7^{[a]}	218^{[c]}	Jordan Poyer	CB	Oregon State
7^{[a]}	239^{[d]}	David King	DT	Oklahoma

Notes

^{^[a]} The Eagles traded their original fourth- and seventh-round selections (101st and 210th overall) to the Jacksonville Jaguars in exchange for the Jaguars' fourth-round selection (98th overall).
^{^[b]} The Eagles traded their original sixth-round selection (173rd overall) to the Cleveland Browns in exchange for safety David Sims and the Browns' seventh-round selection (212th overall).
^{^[c]} The Eagles acquired an additional sixth-round selection (196th overall) in a 2011 trade that sent defensive tackle Brodrick Bunkley to the Denver Broncos; the Eagles later traded this selection along with a conditional 2014 selection to the Tampa Bay Buccaneers in exchange for wide receiver Arrelious Benn and the Buccaneers' 2013 seventh-round selection (218th overall).
^{^[d]} Compensatory selection.

== Personnel ==
=== Staff / Coaches ===
2013 Philadelphia Eagles staff
Front office: Chairman/CEO – Jeffrey Lurie; President – Don Smolenski; general manager – Howie Roseman; Senior football advisor – Tom Donahoe; Vice president of player personnel – Tom Gamble; Assistant director of player personnel – Ed Marynowitz; Director of college scouting – Anthony Patch; Player personnel executive – Rick Mueller; Head coaches: Head coach – Chip Kelly; Assistant head coach/defensive line – Jerry Azzinaro; Offensive coaches: Offensive coordinator – Pat Shurmur; Quarterbacks – Bill Lazor; Running backs – Duce Staley; Wide receivers – Bob Bicknell; Tight ends – Ted Williams; Assistant tight ends – Justin Peelle; Offensive line – Jeff Stoutland; Assistant offensive line – Greg Austin; Offensive quality control – Press Taylor	Defensive coaches: Defensive coordinator – Billy Davis; Assistant defensive line – Erik Chinander; Outside linebackers – Bill McGovern; Inside linebackers – Rick Minter; Defensive backs – John Lovett; Assistant defensive backs – Todd Lyght; Defensive quality control – Mike Dawson; Special teams coaches: Special teams coordinator – Dave Fipp; Assistant special teams – Mathew Harper; Strength and conditioning: Head strength and conditioning – Josh Hingst; Sports science coordinator – Shaun Huls

== Final roster ==
2013 Philadelphia Eagles roster
Quarterbacks (QB): 2 Matt Barkley; 9 Nick Foles; 7 Michael Vick; Running backs (RB): 34 Bryce Brown; 25 LeSean McCoy; 32 Chris Polk; 39 Matthew Tucker; Wide receivers (WR): 81 Jason Avant; 14 Riley Cooper; 10 DeSean Jackson; 13 Damaris Johnson; 88 Jeff Maehl; 16 Brad Smith; Tight ends (TE): 85 James Casey; 87 Brent Celek; 86 Zach Ertz	Offensive linemen (OL): 76 Allen Barbre G; 79 Todd Herremans G; 65 Lane Johnson T; 62 Jason Kelce C; 67 Dennis Kelly T; 69 Evan Mathis G; 71 Jason Peters T; 64 Matt Tobin T; 61 Julian Vandervelde C; Defensive linemen (DL): 91 Fletcher Cox DE; 75 Vinny Curry DE; 90 Clifton Geathers DE; 96 Bennie Logan NT; 77 Damion Square NT; 72 Cedric Thornton DE	Linebackers (LB): 98 Connor Barwin OLB; 58 Trent Cole OLB; 53 Najee Goode ILB; 55 Brandon Graham OLB; 95 Mychal Kendricks ILB; 54 Jake Knott ILB; 50 Casey Matthews OLB; 59 DeMeco Ryans ILB; Defensive backs (DB): 29 Nate Allen SS; 30 Colt Anderson SS; 22 Brandon Boykin CB; 21 Roc Carmichael CB; 23 Patrick Chung FS; 42 Kurt Coleman FS; 24 Bradley Fletcher CB; 38 Keelan Johnson SS; 31 Curtis Marsh CB; 26 Cary Williams CB; 28 Earl Wolff FS; Special teams (ST): 46 Jon Dorenbos LS; 6 Alex Henery K; 8 Donnie Jones P	Practice squad: 51 Emmanuel Acho LB; 93 Brandon Bair DE; 74 Michael Bamiro T; 89 B. J. Cunningham WR; 82 Emil Igwenagu TE; 4 G. J. Kinne QB; 57 Travis Long LB; 84 Will Murphy WR; Reserve: 17 Arrelious Benn WR (IR); 56 Phillip Hunt OLB (IR); 73 Joe Kruger DE (IR); 18 Jeremy Maclin WR (IR); 52 Jason Phillips ILB (IR); Rookies in italics 53 active, 5 reserve, 8 practice squad

== Preseason ==
Week	Date	Opponent	Result	Record	Venue	Recap
1	August 9	New England Patriots	L 22–31	0–1	Lincoln Financial Field	Recap
2	August 15	Carolina Panthers	W 14–9	1–1	Lincoln Financial Field	Recap
3	August 24	at Jacksonville Jaguars	W 31–24	2–1	EverBank Field	Recap
4	August 29	at New York Jets	L 20–27	2–2	MetLife Stadium	Recap

== Regular season ==
=== Schedule ===
Week	Date	Opponent	Result	Record	Venue	Recap
1	September 9	at **Washington Redskins**	**W** 33–27	1–0	FedExField	Recap
2	September 15	San Diego Chargers	**L** 30–33	1–1	Lincoln Financial Field	Recap
3	September 19	Kansas City Chiefs	**L** 16–26	1–2	Lincoln Financial Field	Recap
4	September 29	at Denver Broncos	**L** 20–52	1–3	Sports Authority Field at Mile High	Recap
5	October 6	at **New York Giants**	**W** 36–21	2–3	MetLife Stadium	Recap
6	October 13	at Tampa Bay Buccaneers	**W** 31–20	3–3	Raymond James Stadium	Recap
7	October 20	**Dallas Cowboys**	**L** 3–17	3–4	Lincoln Financial Field	Recap
8	October 27	**New York Giants**	**L** 7–15	3–5	Lincoln Financial Field	Recap
9	November 3	at Oakland Raiders	**W** 49–20	4–5	O.co Coliseum	Recap
10	November 10	at Green Bay Packers	**W** 27–13	5–5	Lambeau Field	Recap
11	November 17	**Washington Redskins**	**W** 24–16	6–5	Lincoln Financial Field	Recap
12	Bye					
13	December 1	Arizona Cardinals	**W** 24–21	7–5	Lincoln Financial Field	Recap
14	December 8	Detroit Lions	**W** 34–20	8–5	Lincoln Financial Field	Recap
15	December 15	at Minnesota Vikings	**L** 30–48	8–6	Mall of America Field	Recap
16	December 22	Chicago Bears	**W** 54–11	9–6	Lincoln Financial Field	Recap
17	December 29	at **Dallas Cowboys**	**W** 24–22	10–6	AT&T Stadium	Recap

Note: Intra-division opponents are in bold text.

=== Game summaries ===
==== Week 1: at Washington Redskins ====
Week One: Philadelphia Eagles at Washington Redskins – Game summary

Quarter	1	2	3	4	Total
**Eagles**	12	14	7	0	**33**
Redskins	7	0	7	13	**27**

at FedExField, Landover, Maryland

- Date: September 9
- Game time: 7:10 p.m. EDT
- Game weather: 80 °F (27 °C), cloudy
- Game attendance: 82,743
- Referee: Ron Winter
- TV announcers (ESPN): Mike Tirico, Jon Gruden and Lisa Salters
- Recap, Game book

Game information

**First quarter**

- WAS – DeAngelo Hall 75-yard fumble return (Kai Forbath kick), 11:54. Redskins 7–0.
- PHI – Alex Henery 48-yard field goal, 9:15. Redskins 7–3. **Drive: 9 plays, 51 yards, 2:39.**
- PHI – DeSean Jackson 25-yard pass from Michael Vick (Alex Henery kick), 8:59. Eagles 10–7. **Drive: 1 play, 25 yards, 0:08.**
- PHI – Alfred Morris tackled in the end zone by Trent Cole for a safety, 4:50. Eagles 12–7.

**Second quarter**

- PHI – Brent Celek 28-yard pass from Michael Vick (Alex Henery kick), 6:10. Eagles 19–7. **Drive: 5 plays, 62 yards, 2:07.**
- PHI – Michael Vick 3-yard run (Alex Henery kick), 0:58. Eagles 26–7. **Drive: 9 plays, 44 yards, 3:13.**

**Third quarter**

- PHI – LeSean McCoy 34-yard run (Alex Henery kick), 13:26. Eagles 33–7. **Drive: 2 plays, 30 yards, 0:34.**
- WAS – Alfred Morris 5-yard run (Kai Forbath kick), 0:06. Eagles 33–14. **Drive: 8 plays, 66 yards, 3:30.**

**Fourth quarter**

- WAS – Leonard Hankerson 10-yard pass from Robert Griffin III (pass failed), 12:24. Eagles 33–20. **Drive: 4 plays, 29 yards, 1:22.**
- WAS – Leonard Hankerson 24-yard pass from Robert Griffin III (Kai Forbath kick), 1:14. Eagles 33–27. **Drive: 9 plays, 89 yards, 2:28.**

**Top passers**

- PHI – Michael Vick – 15/25, 203 yards, 2 TD
- WAS – Robert Griffin III – 30/49, 329 yards, 2 TD, 2 INT

**Top rushers**

- PHI – LeSean McCoy – 31 rushes, 184 yards, TD
- WAS – Alfred Morris – 12 rushes, 45 yards, TD

**Top receivers**

- PHI – DeSean Jackson – 7 receptions, 104 yards, TD
- WAS – Leonard Hankerson – 5 receptions, 80 yards, 2 TD

The Eagles started their 2013 season with a Monday Night divisional clash on the road against the Washington Redskins. The Skins scored first when DeAngelo Hall returned a fumble 75 yards for a touchdown for a 7–0 lead. After this the Eagles dominated scoring 33 straight points as Alex Henery kicked a field goal from 48 yards out to come within four points for a 7–3 game. Next Michael Vick found DeSean Jackson on a 25-yard pass as the team took the lead 10–7. On the Skins' next possession, Alfred Morris was tackled in the end zone for a safety making the score 12–7. In the second quarter, the Eagles continued to increase their lead as Vick found Brent Celek on a 28-yard touchdown pass for a 19–7 lead. Later on in the quarter, Vick ran for a 3-yard touchdown bringing the halftime score to 26–7. In the third quarter, LeSean McCoy ran for a 34-yard touchdown bringing the score to 33–7. The Skins started their scoring again as Morris ran for a 5-yard touchdown making the score 33–14. In the fourth quarter, it was all Skins as RG3 found Leonard Hankerson on a 10-yard touchdown pass (with a failed two-point conversion) for a 33–20 game. Finally, the Skins came within six points as RG3 and Hankerson connected again this time on a 24-yard pass bringing the final score to 33–27.

With the win, the Eagles started their season 1–0.

==== Week 2: vs. San Diego Chargers ====
Week Two: San Diego Chargers at Philadelphia Eagles – Game summary

Quarter	1	2	3	4	Total
**Chargers**	3	10	7	13	**33**
Eagles	3	7	10	10	**30**

at Lincoln Financial Field, Philadelphia, Pennsylvania

- Date: September 15
- Game time: 1:00 pm. EDT
- Game weather: Sunny, 72 °F (22 °C)
- Game attendance: 69,144
- Referee: Terry McAulay
- TV announcers (CBS): Greg Gumbel and Dan Dierdorf
- Recap, Game book

Game information

**First quarter**

- SD – Nick Novak 49-yard field goal, 7:26. Chargers 3–0. **Drive: 8 plays, 59 yards, 4:25.**
- PHI – Alex Henery 25-yard field goal, 5:30. Tied 3–3. **Drive: 5 plays, 70 yards, 1:56.**

**Second quarter**

- SD – Eddie Royal 11-yard pass from Philip Rivers (Nick Novak kick), 14:07. Chargers 10–3. **Drive: 11 plays, 93 yards, 6:23.**
- SD – Nick Novak 44-yard field goal, 8:01. Chargers 13–3. **Drive: 7 plays, 53 yards, 3:37.**
- PHI – Riley Cooper 13-yard pass from Michael Vick (Alex Henery kick), 6:41. Chargers 13–10. **Drive: 4 plays, 75 yards, 1:20.**

**Third quarter**

- SD – Eddie Royal 24-yard pass from Philip Rivers (Nick Novak kick), 10:04. Chargers 20–10. **Drive: 11 plays, 80 yards, 4:56.**
- PHI – Alex Henery 48-yard field goal, 6:45. Chargers 20–13. **Drive: 8 plays, 49 yards, 3:19.**
- PHI – DeSean Jackson 61-yard pass from Michael Vick (Alex Henery kick), 4:42. Tied 20–20. **Drive: 2 plays, 65 yards, 0:26.**

**Fourth quarter**

- SD – Nick Novak 33-yard field goal, 10:47. Chargers 23–20. **Drive: 17 plays, 73 yards, 8:55.**
- PHI – Michael Vick 2-yard run (Alex Henery kick), 7:06. Eagles 27–23. **Drive: 10 plays, 76 yards, 3:41.**
- SD – Eddie Royal 15-yard pass from Philip Rivers (Nick Novak kick), 3:11. Chargers 30–27. **Drive: 7 plays, 39 yards, 3:55.**
- PHI – Alex Henery 32-yard field goal, 1:51. Tied 30–30. **Drive: 9 plays, 57 yards, 1:20.**
- SD – Nick Novak 46-yard field goal, 0:07. Chargers 33–30. **Drive: 9 plays, 51 yards, 1:44.**

**Top passers**

- SD – Philip Rivers – 36/47, 419 yards, 3 TD
- PHI – Michael Vick – 24/37, 428 yards, 2 TD

**Top rushers**

- SD – Ryan Mathews – 16 rushes, 73 yards
- PHI – LeSean McCoy – 11 rushes, 53 yards

**Top receivers**

- SD – Antonio Gates – 8 receptions, 124 yards
- PHI – DeSean Jackson – 9 receptions, 193 yards, TD

The Eagles punted on their first possession. The Chargers took the ball and marched to the Eagles 31, but had to settle for a 49 field goal. The Eagles took the ball next and stormed 75 yards in 5 plays, driving to the Chargers 2, but kicked a field goal.

==== Week 3: vs. Kansas City Chiefs ====
Week Three: Kansas City Chiefs at Philadelphia Eagles – Game summary

Quarter	1	2	3	4	Total
**Chiefs**	10	6	0	10	**26**
Eagles	6	0	3	7	**16**

at Lincoln Financial Field, Philadelphia, Pennsylvania

- Date: September 19
- Game time: 8:25 pm. EDT
- Game weather: Clear, 63 °F (17 °C)
- Game attendance: 69,144
- Referee: Walt Anderson
- TV announcers (NFLN): Brad Nessler, Mike Mayock and Alex Flanagan
- Recap, Game book

Game information

**First quarter**

- KC – Ryan Succop 33-yard field goal, 12:08. Chiefs 3–0. **Drive: 4 plays, −7 yards, 1:50.**
- KC – Eric Berry 38-yard interception return (Ryan Succop kick), 11:12. Chiefs 10–0.
- PHI – Jason Avant 22-yard pass from Michael Vick (run failed), 5:06. Chiefs 10–6. **Drive: 3 plays, 87 yards, 1:16.**

**Second quarter**

- KC – Ryan Succop 31-yard field goal, 8:21. Chiefs 13–6. **Drive: 8 plays, 69 yards, 3:07.**
- KC – Ryan Succop 34-yard field goal, 2:26. Chiefs 16–6. **Drive: 8 plays, 45 yards, 3:51.**

**Third quarter**

- PHI – Alex Henery 29-yard field goal, 6:29. Chiefs 16–9. **Drive: 10 plays, 70 yards, 3:05.**

**Fourth quarter**

- KC – Jamaal Charles 3-yard run (Ryan Succop kick), 12:57. Chiefs 23–9. **Drive: 8 plays, 62 yards, 4:45.**
- PHI – LeSean McCoy 41-yard run (Alex Henery kick), 11:36. Chiefs 23–16. **Drive: 5 plays, 78 yards, 1:21.**
- KC – Ryan Succop 38-yard field goal, 3:21. Chiefs 26–16. **Drive: 15 plays, 75 yards, 8:15.**

**Top passers**

- KC – Alex Smith – 22/35, 273 yards
- PHI – Michael Vick – 13/30, 201 yards, TD, 2 INT

**Top rushers**

- KC – Jamaal Charles – 20 rushes, 92 yards, TD
- PHI – LeSean McCoy – 20 rushes, 158 yards, TD

**Top receivers**

- KC – Donnie Avery – 7 receptions, 141 yards
- PHI – Jason Avant – 5 receptions, 87 yards, TD

This week marked the return of former Eagles head coach Andy Reid. The Eagles forced the Chiefs to a quick three-and-out, but the Eagles muffed the punt, and the Chiefs recovered at the Philadelphia 8. A few plays later, Ryan Succop kicked a 33-yard field goal. On Philadelphia's first possession, Michael Vick was intercepted by Eric Berry, on a pass intended for Brent Celek, who returned it 38 yards for a touchdown. After a Chiefs punt, Michael Vick busted off a 61-yard run, setting up his 22-yard touchdown pass to Jason Avant. Zach Ertz attempted to run in the two-point conversion, but failed, keeping the score 10–6. With less than a minute remaining in the first quarter the Eagles drove into Chiefs territory, but Vick was sacked by Justin Houston and fumbled. Two field goals by Ryan Succop was the only scoring of the second quarter, giving the Chiefs a 16–6 halftime lead. An Alex Henery field goal was the only score of the third quarter, giving the Chiefs a 16–9 lead entering the fourth quarter. On their first drive of the fourth quarter, Jamaal Charles capped off an eight-play, 62-yard drive with a 3-yard touchdown run, making the score 23–9. The Eagles immediately responded with a touchdown of their own, driving 78 yards with a 41-yard touchdown rush by LeSean McCoy, pulling to within 7. However, Kansas City struck the decisive blow with a 15-play, 73-yard drive, taking 8:15 off the clock and Ryan Succop adding his fourth field goals making the score 26–16. On their next drive, Michael Vick completed a 19-yard pass on third-and-10, but guard Todd Herremans was called for holding making it third-and-20 at their own 21. The Eagles turned the ball over on downs. The Chiefs did the same on their next drive. Finally, a strip sack by Justin Houston with recovering for Kansas City, sealed the deal. With the loss, the Eagles lost their second in a row, both being at home. The Eagles outgained Chiefs 431–394 and had more first downs, 21–19, but the Chiefs had almost twice as much time of possession and won the turnover battle 5–0.

==== Week 4: at Denver Broncos ====
Week Four: Philadelphia Eagles at Denver Broncos – Game summary

Quarter	1	2	3	4	Total
Eagles	3	10	0	7	**20**
**Broncos**	14	7	21	10	**52**

at Sports Authority Field at Mile High, Denver, Colorado

- Date: September 29
- Game time: 4:25 pm. EDT/2:25 p.m. MDT
- Game weather: 76 °F (24 °C), partly cloudy
- Game attendance: 77,002
- Referee: Pete Morelli
- TV announcers (Fox): Joe Buck, Troy Aikman and Pam Oliver
- Recap, Game book

Game information

**First quarter**

- DEN – Wes Welker 6-yard pass from Peyton Manning (Matt Prater kick), 10:19. Broncos 7–0. **Drive: 9 plays, 74 yards, 3:52.**
- PHI – Alex Henery 35-yard field goal, 6:03. Broncos 7–3. **Drive: 11 plays, 65 yards, 4:16.**
- DEN – Trindon Holliday 105-yard kickoff return (Matt Prater kick), 5:50. Broncos 14–3. **Drive: 0 plays, 0 yards, 0:13.**

**Second quarter**

- PHI – Alex Henery 25-yard field goal, 14:18. Broncos 14–6. **Drive: 15 plays, 73 yards, 6:32.**
- PHI – Chris Polk 4-yard run (Alex Henery kick), 11:06. Broncos 14–13. **Drive: 7 plays, 64 yards, 2:10.**
- DEN – Knowshon Moreno 4-yard run (Matt Prater kick), 5:05. Broncos 21–13. **Drive: 11 plays, 80 yards, 6:01.**

**Third quarter**

- DEN – Demaryius Thomas 1-yard pass from Peyton Manning (Matt Prater kick), 9:54. Broncos 28–13. **Drive: 10 plays, 80 yards, 5:06.**
- DEN – Demaryius Thomas 15-yard pass from Peyton Manning (Matt Prater kick), 5:10. Broncos 35–13. **Drive: 8 plays, 80 yards, 3:12.**
- DEN – Wes Welker 4-yard pass from Peyton Manning (Matt Prater kick), 0:22. Broncos 42–13. **Drive: 7 plays, 65 yards, 3:35.**

**Fourth quarter**

- DEN – Steven Johnson 17-yard return of blocked punt (Matt Prater kick), 13:54. Broncos 49–13.
- DEN – Matt Prater 53-yard field goal, 6:53. Broncos 52–13. **Drive: 7 plays, 30 yards, 3:49.**
- PHI – Jeff Maehl 6-yard pass from Nick Foles (Alex Henery kick), 4:35. Broncos 52–20. **Drive: 7 plays, 80 yards, 2:18.**

**Top passers**

- PHI – Michael Vick – 14/27, 248 yards
- DEN – Peyton Manning – 28/34, 327 yards, 4 TD

**Top rushers**

- PHI – LeSean McCoy – 16 rushes, 73 yards
- DEN – Knowshon Moreno – 12 rushes, 78 yards, TD

**Top receivers**

- PHI – Brent Celek – 3 receptions, 57 yards
- DEN – Eric Decker – 5 receptions, 88 yards

The Eagles visited Sports Authority Field in Denver to face the Broncos and their #1 offense. The Eagles received the ball first, but punted after only four plays. The Broncos took over and stormed 74 yards in only 9 plays to take the early lead. On the drive the Broncos converted three third downs on the drive including one on Peyton Manning's 6-yard touchdown pass to Wes Welker. The Eagles responded on their next drive by driving from their own 18 to the Broncos 17, but had to settle for Henery's 35-yard field goal. On the ensuing kickoff Trindon Holliday returned the kick 105 yards for a touchdown, extending the lead to 14–3. The Eagles then engineered a 15-play, 73-yard drive to the 7-yard line, but the Broncos kept them out of the end zone and Henery kicked a 25-yard field goal. After a Broncos three-and-out, the Eagles finally managed to reach the end zone. They needed only 7 plays to go 64 yards. A 35-yard completion to Bryce Brown on third-and-11 moved the ball to the Denver 4. Two plays later Chris Polk rushed for a 4-yard touchdown, trimming the score to 14–13. Denver responded by marching 80 yards in 11 plays in a drive that took over 6 minutes off the clock and increased the lead to 21–13 after a Knowshon Moreno 4-yard touchdown run. Both teams punted to close out the half. Denver started where they left off, driving 80 yards in one less play culminating in Manning's 1-yard touchdown pass to Demaryius Thomas. Manning threw for 44 yards on the drive. After an Eagles punt, the Broncos ate 80 more yards on another touchdown drive which. Manning continued to pick apart the Eagles secondary throwing for 58 yards on the drive which concluded with Manning once again connecting with Demaryius Thomas on a touchdown, this one for 15 yards, extending the lead to 35–13. The Eagles offense continued sputter as they punted again. The Broncos were completely the opposite, driving 65 yards for another touchdown, increasing the lead to 42–13. Manning added 56 more yards and a 4-yard touchdown pass to Welker. The Broncos forced the Eagles to punt again, but Steven Johnson blocked it and returned it 17 yards for a touchdown, making the score 49–13. The Eagles finally managed to avoid punting on their next drive, but Henery missed a 46-yard field goal. Matt Prater made one from 53 yards away on the Broncos next drive to make the score 52–13. The Eagles managed to march 80 yards on their next drive with Nick Foles hitting Jeff Maehl for a 6-yard touchdown pass to close the scoring. The Broncos held the ball for the final 4:35 to end the game. The Eagles lost their third in a row to fall to 1–3 on the season. This was their last loss to Denver until 2025.

==== Week 5: at New York Giants ====
Week Five: Philadelphia Eagles at New York Giants – Game summary

Quarter	1	2	3	4	Total
**Eagles**	3	16	3	14	**36**
Giants	7	0	14	0	**21**

at MetLife Stadium, East Rutherford, New Jersey

- Date: October 6
- Game time: 1:00 pm. EDT
- Game weather: 66 °F (19 °C), mostly cloudy
- Game attendance: 80,738
- Referee: Walt Coleman
- TV announcers (Fox): Thom Brennaman, Brian Billick and Laura Okmin
- Recap, Game book

Game information

**First quarter**

- NYG – David Wilson 5-yard run (Josh Brown kick), 11:37. Giants 7–0. **Drive: 5 plays, 62 yards, 2:24.**
- PHI – Alex Henery 40-yard field goal, 6:49. Giants 7–3. **Drive: 10 plays, 58 yards, 4:48.**

**Second quarter**

- PHI – Alex Henery 27-yard field goal, 10:40. Giants 7–6. **Drive: 8 plays, 51 yards, 3:21.**
- PHI – LeSean McCoy 1-yard run (Alex Henery kick), 8:11. Eagles 13–7. **Drive: 4 plays, 71 yards, 1:29.**
- PHI – Alex Henery 29-yard field goal, 2:38. Eagles 16–7. **Drive: 8 plays, 36 yards, 3:51.**
- PHI – Alex Henery 36-yard field goal, 0:00. Eagles 19–7. **Drive: 11 plays, 75 yards, 1:33.**

**Third quarter**

- NYG – Rueben Randle 26-yard pass from Eli Manning (Josh Brown kick), 6:58. Eagles 19–14. **Drive: 7 plays, 87 yards, 3:44.**
- NYG – Rueben Randle 6-yard pass from Eli Manning (Josh Brown kick), 3:46. Eagles 21–19. **Drive: 7 plays, 51 yards, 1:57.**
- PHI – Alex Henery 41-yard field goal, 1:04. Eagles 22–21. **Drive: 8 plays, 57 yards, 2:42.**

**Fourth quarter**

- PHI – Brent Celek 25-yard pass from Nick Foles (Alex Henery kick), 10:26. Eagles 29–21. **Drive: 1 play, 25 yards, 0:09.**
- PHI – DeSean Jackson 5-yard pass from Nick Foles (Alex Henery kick), 8:24. Eagles 36–21. **Drive: 4 plays, 38 yards, 1:38.**

**Top passers**

- PHI – Nick Foles – 16/25, 197 yards, 2 TD
- NYG – Eli Manning – 24/52, 334 yards, 2 TD, 3 INT

**Top rushers**

- PHI – Michael Vick – 7 rushes, 79 yards
- NYG – Brandon Jacobs – 11 rushes, 37 yards

**Top receivers**

- PHI – DeSean Jackson – 7 receptions, 132 yards, TD
- NYG – Hakeem Nicks – 9 receptions, 142 yards

==== Week 6: at Tampa Bay Buccaneers ====
Week Six: Philadelphia Eagles at Tampa Bay Buccaneers – Game summary

Quarter	1	2	3	4	Total
**Eagles**	7	7	7	10	**31**
Buccaneers	3	14	0	3	**20**

at Raymond James Stadium, Tampa, Florida

- Date: October 13
- Game time: 1:00 pm. EDT
- Game weather: 82 °F (28 °C), cloudy
- Game attendance: 62,505
- Referee: Clete Blakeman
- TV announcers (Fox): Dick Stockton, Ronde Barber and Kris Budden
- Recap, Game book

Game information

**First quarter**

- PHI – Nick Foles 4-yard run (Alex Henery kick), 11:46. Eagles 7–0. **Drive: 8 plays, 85 yards, 3:14.**
- TB – Rian Lindell 38-yard field goal, 6:30. Eagles 7–3. **Drive: 7 plays, 20 yards, 4:06.**

**Second quarter**

- TB – Vincent Jackson 24-yard pass from Mike Glennon (Rian Lindell kick), 14:46. Buccaneers 10–7. **Drive: 4 plays, 39 yards, 0:55.**
- PHI – DeSean Jackson 12-yard pass from Nick Foles (Alex Henery kick), 7:05. Eagles 14–10. **Drive: 8 plays, 54 yards, 3:20.**
- TB – Vincent Jackson 1-yard pass from Mike Glennon (Rian Lindell kick), 1:02. Buccaneers 17–14. **Drive: 10 plays, 79 yards, 6:03.**

**Third quarter**

- PHI – Riley Cooper 47-yard pass from Nick Foles (Alex Henery kick), 11:41. Eagles 21–17. **Drive: 5 plays, 66 yards, 1:58.**

**Fourth quarter**

- TB – Rian Lindell 27-yard field goal, 10:48. Eagles 21–20. **Drive: 16 plays, 90 yards, 7:57.**
- PHI – DeSean Jackson 36-yard pass from Nick Foles (Alex Henery kick), 9:32. Eagles 28–20. **Drive: 3 plays, 80 yards, 1:16.**
- PHI – Alex Henery 24-yard field goal, 2:34. Eagles 31–20. **Drive: 12 plays, 49 yards, 5:29.**

**Top passers**

- PHI – Nick Foles – 22/31, 296 yards, 3 TD
- TB – Mike Glennon – 26/43, 273 yards, 2 TD, INT

**Top rushers**

- PHI – LeSean McCoy – 25 rushes, 116 yards
- TB – Doug Martin – 16 rushes, 67 yards

**Top receivers**

- PHI – Riley Cooper – 4 receptions, 120 yards, TD
- TB – Vincent Jackson – 9 receptions, 114 yards, 2 TD

==== Week 7: vs. Dallas Cowboys ====
Week Seven: Dallas Cowboys at Philadelphia Eagles – Game summary

Quarter	1	2	3	4	Total
**Cowboys**	0	3	7	7	**17**
Eagles	0	0	0	3	**3**

at Lincoln Financial Field, Philadelphia, Pennsylvania

- Date: October 20
- Game time: 1:00 pm. EDT
- Game weather: Sunny, 63 °F (17 °C)
- Game attendance: 69,144
- Referee: John Parry
- TV announcers (Fox): Thom Brennaman, Troy Aikman and Pam Oliver
- Recap, Game book

Game information

**First quarter**

- No scoring plays.

**Second quarter**

- DAL – Dan Bailey 38-yard field goal, 3:17. Cowboys 3–0. **Drive: 8 plays, 44 yards, 3:42.**

**Third quarter**

- DAL – Philip Tanner 1-yard run (Dan Bailey kick), 9:17. Cowboys 10–0. **Drive: 10 plays, 66 yards, 5:43.**

**Fourth quarter**

- PHI – Alex Henery 31-yard field goal, 14:57. Cowboys 10–3. **Drive: 10 plays, 17 yards, 2:49.**
- DAL – Terrance Williams 9-yard pass from Tony Romo (Dan Bailey kick), 9:25. Cowboys 17–3. **Drive: 10 plays, 72 yards, 5:32.**

**Top passers**

- DAL – Tony Romo – 28/47, 317 yards, TD, 2 INT
- PHI – Matt Barkley – 11/20, 129 yards, 3 INT

**Top rushers**

- DAL – Joseph Randle – 19 rushes, 65 yards
- PHI – LeSean McCoy – 18 rushes, 55 yards

**Top receivers**

- DAL – Dez Bryant – 8 receptions, 110 yards
- PHI – Riley Cooper – 6 receptions, 88 yards

==== Week 8: vs. New York Giants ====
Week Eight: New York Giants at Philadelphia Eagles – Game summary

Quarter	1	2	3	4	Total
**Giants**	6	6	0	3	**15**
Eagles	0	0	0	7	**7**

at Lincoln Financial Field, Philadelphia, Pennsylvania

- Date: October 27
- Game time: 1:00 pm. EDT
- Game weather: Sunny, 59 °F (15 °C)
- Game attendance: 69,144
- Referee: Carl Cheffers
- TV announcers (Fox): Kenny Albert, Daryl Johnston and Tony Siragusa
- Recap, Game book

Game information

**First quarter**

- NYG – Josh Brown 40-yard field goal, 7:30. Giants 3–0. **Drive: 9 plays, 57 yards, 4:24.**
- NYG – Josh Brown 44-yard field goal, 2:59. Giants 6–0. **Drive: 7 plays, 45 yards, 3:04.**

**Second quarter**

- NYG – Josh Brown 33-yard field goal, 10:22. Giants 9–0. **Drive: 12 plays, 48 yards, 5:31.**
- NYG – Josh Brown 46-yard field goal, 2:24. Giants 12–0. **Drive: 9 plays, 53 yards, 5:08.**

**Third quarter**

- No scoring plays.

**Fourth quarter**

- NYG – Josh Brown 27-yard field goal, 12:23. Giants 15–0. **Drive: 9 plays, 32 yards, 5:58.**
- PHI – Najee Goode 2-yard fumble return (Alex Henery kick), 4:11. Giants 15–7.

**Top passers**

- NYG – Eli Manning – 25/39, 246 yards
- PHI – Matt Barkley – 17/26, 158 yards

**Top rushers**

- NYG – Peyton Hillis – 20 rushes, 70 yards
- PHI – LeSean McCoy – 15 rushes, 48 yards

**Top receivers**

- NYG – Victor Cruz – 7 receptions, 86 yards
- PHI – DeSean Jackson – 8 receptions, 63 yards

Nick Foles was injured again, so Michael Vick was reinserted into the starting role, but after a few series, Matt Barkley took his place. Despite the Eagles defense not allowing a touchdown all game, the offense was stymied throughout the contest. Philadelphia's lone score, and the game's only touchdown, occurred on a fumble recovery late in the fourth quarter; the Giants botched a snap for a punt, which was then recovered by Najee Goode in New York's endzone for a touchdown. With the 15-7 loss, the Eagles fell to 3–5. Until the 2026 season, this was Philadelphia's most recent home loss to the Giants.

==== Week 9: at Oakland Raiders ====
Week Nine: Philadelphia Eagles at Oakland Raiders – Game summary

Quarter	1	2	3	4	Total
**Eagles**	7	21	21	0	**49**
Raiders	3	10	0	7	**20**

at O.co Coliseum, Oakland, California

- Date: November 3
- Game time: 4:05 pm. EST/1:05 p.m. PST
- Game weather: 62 °F (17 °C), sunny, hazy skies
- Game attendance: 51,751
- Referee: Ed Hochuli
- TV announcers (Fox): Chris Myers, Tim Ryan and Jennifer Hale
- Recap, Game book

Game information

**First quarter**

- PHI – Brent Celek 2-yard pass from Nick Foles (Alex Henery kick), 5:18. Eagles 7–0. **Drive: 10 plays, 84 yards, 3:58.**
- OAK – Sebastian Janikowski 24-yard field goal, 2:02. Eagles 7–3. **Drive: 7 plays, 74 yards, 3:16.**

**Second quarter**

- PHI – Riley Cooper 17-yard pass from Nick Foles (Alex Henery kick), 14:17. Eagles 14–3. **Drive: 8 plays, 82 yards, 2:45.**
- PHI – Riley Cooper 63-yard pass from Nick Foles (Alex Henery kick), 11:17. Eagles 21–3. **Drive: 1 play, 63 yards, 0:09.**
- OAK – Rashad Jennings 8-yard run (Sebastian Janikowski kick), 7:34. Eagles 21–10. **Drive: 6 plays, 80 yards, 3:43.**
- PHI – Zach Ertz 15-yard pass from Nick Foles (Alex Henery kick), 4:03. Eagles 28–10. **Drive: 8 plays, 80 yards, 3:31.**
- OAK – Sebastian Janikowski 53-yard field goal, 0:03. Eagles 28–13. **Drive: 9 plays, 40 yards, 0:56.**

**Third quarter**

- PHI – LeSean McCoy 25-yard pass from Nick Foles (Alex Henery kick), 14:14. Eagles 35–13. **Drive: 4 plays, 61 yards, 0:46.**
- PHI – DeSean Jackson 46-yard pass from Nick Foles (Alex Henery kick), 11:13. Eagles 42–13. **Drive: 3 plays, 57 yards, 0:51.**
- PHI – Riley Cooper 5-yard pass from Nick Foles (Alex Henery kick), 4:28. Eagles 49–13. **Drive: 3 plays, 68 yards, 1:18.**

**Fourth quarter**

- OAK – Jeremy Stewart 2-yard run (Sebastian Janikowski kick), 0:52. Eagles 49–20. **Drive: 10 plays, 71 yards, 2:30.**

**Top passers**

- PHI – Nick Foles – 22/28, 406 yards, 7 TD
- OAK – Terrelle Pryor – 22/41, 288 yards

**Top rushers**

- PHI – Bryce Brown – 7 rushes, 54 yards
- OAK – Rashad Jennings – 15 rushes, 102 yards, TD

**Top receivers**

- PHI – DeSean Jackson – 5 receptions, 150 yards, TD
- OAK – Rod Streater – 5 receptions, 98 yards

Nick Foles tied an NFL record in this game with seven touchdown passes.

==== Week 10: at Green Bay Packers ====
Week Ten: Philadelphia Eagles at Green Bay Packers – Game summary

Quarter	1	2	3	4	Total
**Eagles**	7	3	17	0	**27**
Packers	0	3	7	3	**13**

at Lambeau Field, Green Bay, Wisconsin

- Date: November 10
- Game time: 1:00 pm. EST/12:00 p.m. CST
- Game weather: 45 °F (7 °C), mostly sunny
- Game attendance: 78,011
- Referee: Mike Carey
- TV announcers (Fox): Joe Buck, Troy Aikman and Pam Oliver
- Recap, Game book

Game information

**First quarter**

- PHI – DeSean Jackson 55-yard pass from Nick Foles (Alex Henery kick), 5:57. Eagles 7–0. **Drive: 2 plays, 57 yards, 0:25.**

**Second quarter**

- PHI – Alex Henery 25-yard field goal, 1:16. Eagles 10–0. **Drive: 9 plays, 60 yards, 1:38.**
- GB – Mason Crosby 26-yard field goal, 0:02. Eagles 10–3. **Drive: 9 plays, 72 yards, 1:14.**

**Third quarter**

- PHI – Riley Cooper 45-yard pass from Nick Foles (Alex Henery kick), 11:21. Eagles 17–3. **Drive: 3 plays, 84 yards, 0:51.**
- PHI – Alex Henery 41-yard field goal, 7:28. Eagles 20–3. **Drive: 5 plays, 21 yards, 1:39.**
- GB – Brandon Bostick 22-yard pass from Scott Tolzien (Mason Crosby kick), 3:22. Eagles 20–10. **Drive: 7 plays, 86 yards, 4:06.**
- PHI – Riley Cooper 32-yard pass from Nick Foles (Alex Henery kick), 0:10. Eagles 27–10. **Drive: 7 plays, 80 yards, 3:12.**

**Fourth quarter**

- GB – Mason Crosby 35-yard field goal, 12:19. Eagles 27–13. **Drive: 8 plays, 54 yards, 2:51.**

**Top passers**

- PHI – Nick Foles – 12/18, 228 yards, 3 TD
- GB – Scott Tolzien – 24/39, 280 yards, TD, 2 INT

**Top rushers**

- PHI – LeSean McCoy – 25 rushes, 155 yards
- GB – Eddie Lacy – 24 rushes, 73 yards

**Top receivers**

- PHI – Riley Cooper – 3 receptions, 102 yards, 2 TD
- GB – Jarrett Boykin – 8 receptions, 112 yards

==== Week 11: vs. Washington Redskins ====
Week Eleven: Washington Redskins at Philadelphia Eagles – Game summary

Quarter	1	2	3	4	Total
Redskins	0	0	0	16	**16**
**Eagles**	7	10	7	0	**24**

at Lincoln Financial Field, Philadelphia, Pennsylvania

- Date: November 17
- Game time: 1:00 pm. EST
- Game weather: Mostly cloudy, 68 °F (20 °C)
- Game attendance: 69,144
- Referee: Walt Coleman
- TV announcers (Fox): Kevin Burkhardt, John Lynch and Erin Andrews
- Recap, Game book

Game information

**First quarter**

- PHI – Nick Foles 4-yard run (Alex Henery kick), 2:48. Eagles 7–0. **Drive: 4 plays, 68 yards, 1:16.**

**Second quarter**

- PHI – LeSean McCoy 1-yard run (Alex Henery kick), 14:31. Eagles 14–0. **Drive: 6 plays, 69 yards, 1:48.**
- PHI – Alex Henery 24-yard field goal, 3:51. Eagles 17–0. **Drive: 8 plays, 83 yards, 3:53.**

**Third quarter**

- PHI – LeSean McCoy 1-yard run (Alex Henery kick), 9:41. Eagles 24–0. **Drive: 13 plays, 80 yards, 5:19.**

**Fourth quarter**

- WAS – Darrel Young 62-yard pass from Robert Griffin III (Robert Griffin III–Nick Williams pass), 12:56. Eagles 24–8. **Drive: 1 play, 62 yards, 0:12.**
- WAS – Aldrick Robinson 41-yard pass from Robert Griffin III (Robert Griffin III run), 5:57. Eagles 24–16. **Drive: 7 plays, 85 yards, 2:40.**

**Top passers**

- WAS – Robert Griffin III – 17/35, 264 yards, 2 TD, INT
- PHI – Nick Foles – 17/26, 298 yards

**Top rushers**

- WAS – Alfred Morris – 22 rushes, 93 yards
- PHI – LeSean McCoy – 20 rushes, 77 yards, 2 TD

**Top receivers**

- WAS – Pierre Garçon – 6 receptions, 68 yards
- PHI – DeSean Jackson – 4 receptions, 82 yards

A late game rally by Washington led them to the Eagles' 26-yard line. A shot to the end zone by Robert Griffin III was intercepted by Brandon Boykin, clinching an Eagles win. The Eagles moved to 6–5. Prior to this game, the Eagles hadn't won a game at home in 414 days since Week 4 of the 2012 season against the New York Giants, thus snapping a 10-game losing streak at home with this win.

==== Week 13: vs. Arizona Cardinals ====
Week Thirteen: Arizona Cardinals at Philadelphia Eagles – Game summary

Quarter	1	2	3	4	Total
Cardinals	0	7	7	7	**21**
**Eagles**	7	10	7	0	**24**

at Lincoln Financial Field, Philadelphia, Pennsylvania

- Date: December 1
- Game time: 1:00 pm. EST
- Game weather: Cloudy, 48 °F (9 °C)
- Game attendance: 69,144
- Referee: Tony Corrente
- TV announcers (Fox): Kenny Albert, Daryl Johnston and Tony Siragusa
- Recap, Game book

Game information

**First quarter**

- PHI – Zach Ertz 6-yard pass from Nick Foles (Alex Henery kick), 12:30. Eagles 7–0. **Drive: 4 plays, 25 yards, 0:56.**

**Second quarter**

- ARI – Larry Fitzgerald 43-yard pass from Carson Palmer (Jay Feely kick), 7:50. Tied 7–7. **Drive: 8 plays, 57 yards, 4:13.**
- PHI – Alex Henery 32-yard field goal, 3:59. Eagles 10–7. **Drive: 9 plays, 64 yards, 3:51.**
- PHI – Brent Celek 1-yard pass from Nick Foles (Alex Henery kick), 0:15. Eagles 17–7. **Drive: 9 plays, 78 yards, 2:07.**

**Third quarter**

- PHI – Zach Ertz 24-yard pass from Nick Foles (Alex Henery kick), 10:16. Eagles 24–7. **Drive: 13 plays, 80 yards, 4:44.**
- ARI – Michael Floyd 23-yard pass from Carson Palmer (Jay Feely kick), 5:14. Eagles 24–14. **Drive: 10 plays, 80 yards, 5:02.**

**Fourth quarter**

- ARI – Jim Dray 3-yard pass from Carson Palmer (Jay Feely kick), 4:45. Eagles 24–21. **Drive: 8 plays, 86 yards, 2:35.**

**Top passers**

- ARI – Carson Palmer – 24/41, 302 yards, 3 TD, 2 INT
- PHI – Nick Foles – 21/34, 237 yards, 3 TD

**Top rushers**

- ARI – Rashard Mendenhall – 18 rushes, 76 yards
- PHI – LeSean McCoy – 19 rushes, 79 yards

**Top receivers**

- ARI – Michael Floyd – 5 receptions, 99 yards, TD
- PHI – Zach Ertz – 5 receptions, 68 yards, 2 TD

==== Week 14: vs. Detroit Lions ====
Week Fourteen: Detroit Lions at Philadelphia Eagles – Game summary

Quarter	1	2	3	4	Total
Lions	0	8	6	6	**20**
**Eagles**	0	0	6	28	**34**

at Lincoln Financial Field, Philadelphia, Pennsylvania

- Date: December 8
- Game time: 1:00 pm. EST
- Game weather: Snow, 27 °F (−3 °C)
- Game attendance: 69,144
- Referee: Ed Hochuli
- TV announcers (Fox): Kevin Burkhardt, John Lynch and Molly McGrath
- Recap, Game book

Game information

**First quarter**

- No scoring plays.

**Second quarter**

- DET – Joique Bell 2-yard run (Matthew Stafford–Joique Bell pass), 10:02. Lions 8–0. **Drive: 5 plays, 20 yards, 2:04.**

**Third quarter**

- DET – Jeremy Ross 58-yard punt return (pass failed), 6:37. Lions 14–0.
- PHI – DeSean Jackson 19-yard pass from Nick Foles (pass failed), 4:05. Lions 14–6. **Drive: 5 plays, 74 yards, 2:32.**

**Fourth quarter**

- PHI – LeSean McCoy 40-yard run (Bryce Brown run), 14:34. Tied 14–14. **Drive: 4 plays, 80 yards, 0:50.**
- DET – Jeremy Ross 98-yard kickoff return (kick blocked), 14:20. Lions 20–14. **Drive: 0 plays, 0 yards, 0:14.**
- PHI – LeSean McCoy 57-yard run (Nick Foles–Riley Cooper pass), 13:13. Eagles 22–20. **Drive: 3 plays, 76 yards, 1:07.**
- PHI – Nick Foles 1-yard run (pass failed), 8:18. Eagles 28–20. **Drive: 7 plays, 71 yards, 4:02.**
- PHI – Chris Polk 38-yard run (run failed), 2:58. Eagles 34–20. **Drive: 6 plays, 60 yards, 4:17.**

**Top passers**

- DET – Matthew Stafford – 10/25, 151 yards
- PHI – Nick Foles – 11/22, 179 yards, TD, INT

**Top rushers**

- DET – Joique Bell – 23 carries, 69 yards, TD
- PHI – LeSean McCoy – 29 carries, 217 yards, 2 TDs

**Top receivers**

- DET – Joique Bell – 4 receptions, 58 yards
- PHI – Riley Cooper – 3 receptions, 74 yards

In a blinding snowstorm, with at least eight inches of snow on the field by the end of the game, LeSean McCoy broke the Eagles' single-game rushing record with 217 yards on the ground.

==== Week 15: at Minnesota Vikings ====
Week Fifteen: Philadelphia Eagles at Minnesota Vikings – Game summary

Quarter	1	2	3	4	Total
Eagles	3	6	13	8	**30**
**Vikings**	7	10	10	21	**48**

at Mall of America Field at the Hubert H. Humphrey Metrodome, Minneapolis, Minnesota

- Date: December 15
- Game time: 1:00 pm. EST/12:00 pm. CST
- Game weather: None (indoor stadium)
- Game attendance: 64,087
- Referee: Walt Anderson
- TV announcers (Fox): Kenny Albert, Daryl Johnston and Tony Siragusa
- Recap, Game book

Game information

**First quarter**

- MIN – Greg Jennings 57-yard pass from Matt Cassel (Blair Walsh kick), 6:18. Vikings 7–0. **Drive: 4 plays, 91 yards, 2:04.**
- PHI – Alex Henery 35-yard field goal, 2:35. Vikings 7–3. **Drive: 9 plays, 63 yards, 3:43.**

**Second quarter**

- MIN – Blair Walsh 21-yard field goal, 13:19. Vikings 10–3. **Drive: 10 plays, 59 yards, 4:16.**
- PHI – Alex Henery 51-yard field goal, 8:55. Vikings 10–6. **Drive: 10 plays, 47 yards, 4:24.**
- MIN – Matt Asiata 1-yard run (Blair Walsh kick), 1:06. Vikings 17–6. **Drive: 16 plays, 75 yards, 7:49.**
- PHI – Alex Henery 33-yard field goal, 0:00. Vikings 17–9. **Drive: 8 plays, 66 yards, 1:06.**

**Third quarter**

- MIN – Matt Cassel 6-yard run (Blair Walsh kick), 12:03. Vikings 24–9. **Drive: 4 plays, 52 yards, 1:38.**
- MIN – Blair Walsh 38-yard field goal, 4:43. Vikings 27–9. **Drive: 4 plays, 4 yards, 1:21.**
- PHI – DeSean Jackson 30-yard pass from Nick Foles (Alex Henery kick), 3:14. Vikings 27–16. **Drive: 6 plays, 70 yards, 1:29.**
- PHI – Zach Ertz 3-yard pass from Nick Foles (pass failed), 0:15. Vikings 27–22. **Drive: 3 plays, 45 yards, 1:03.**

**Fourth quarter**

- MIN – Matt Asiata 1-yard run (Blair Walsh kick), 13:01. Vikings 34–22. **Drive: 6 plays, 54 yards, 2:14.**
- MIN – Cordarrelle Patterson 5-yard pass from Matt Cassel (Blair Walsh kick), 6:54. Vikings 41–22. **Drive: 3 plays, 36 yards, 1:01.**
- PHI – Jason Avant 16-yard pass from Nick Foles (Nick Foles–Riley Cooper pass), 4:26. Vikings 41–30. **Drive: 7 plays, 80 yards, 2:28.**
- MIN – Matt Asiata 5-yard run (Blair Walsh kick), 1:09. Vikings 48–30. **Drive: 8 plays, 48 yards, 3:17.**

**Top passers**

- PHI – Nick Foles – 30/48, 428 yards, 3 TD, INT
- MIN – Matt Cassel – 26/35, 382 yards, 2 TD, INT

**Top rushers**

- PHI – Nick Foles – 5 rushes, 41 yards
- MIN – Matt Asiata – 30 rushes, 51 yards, 3 TD

**Top receivers**

- PHI – DeSean Jackson – 10 receptions, 195 yards, TD
- MIN – Greg Jennings – 11 receptions, 163 yards, TD

==== Week 16: vs. Chicago Bears ====
Week Sixteen: Chicago Bears at Philadelphia Eagles – Game summary

Quarter	1	2	3	4	Total
Bears	0	3	8	0	**11**
**Eagles**	21	3	9	21	**54**

at Lincoln Financial Field, Philadelphia, Pennsylvania

- Date: December 22
- Game time: 8:30 pm. EST
- Game weather: Clear, 63 °F (17 °C)
- Game attendance: 69,144
- Referee: Mike Carey
- TV announcers (NBC): Al Michaels, Cris Collinsworth and Michele Tafoya
- Recap, Game book

Game information

**First quarter**

- PHI – Riley Cooper 5-yard pass from Nick Foles (Alex Henery kick), 9:54. Eagles 7–0. **Drive: 6 plays, 43 yards, 2:59.**
- PHI – LeSean McCoy 1-yard run (Alex Henery kick), 7:44. Eagles 14–0. **Drive: 5 plays, 39 yards, 1:58.**
- PHI – Brent Celek 10-yard pass from Nick Foles (Alex Henery kick), 1:27. Eagles 21–0. **Drive: 10 plays, 72 yards, 4:33.**

**Second quarter**

- PHI – Alex Henery 49-yard field goal, 1:07. Eagles 24–0. **Drive: 9 plays, 60 yards, 3:59.**
- CHI – Robbie Gould 50-yard field goal, 0:00. Eagles 24–3. **Drive: 8 plays, 49 yards, 1:07.**

**Third quarter**

- PHI – Matt Forte tackled in the end zone by Cedric Thornton for a safety, 9:52. Eagles 26–3.
- PHI – LeSean McCoy 1-yard run (Alex Henery kick), 7:11 (PHI 33–3)
- CHI – Brandon Marshall 6-yard pass from Jay Cutler (Jay Cutler–Earl Bennett pass), 0:00. Eagles 33–11. **Drive: 11 plays, 70 yards, 5:21.**

**Fourth quarter**

- PHI – Chris Polk 11-yard run (Alex Henery kick), 11:19. Eagles 40–11. **Drive: 6 plays, 70 yards, 3:41.**
- PHI – Brandon Boykin 54-yard interception return (Alex Henery kick), 8:00. Eagles 47–11.
- PHI – Bryce Brown 65-yard run (Alex Henery kick), 6:14. Eagles 54–11. **Drive: 1 play, 65 yards, 0:10.**

**Top passers**

- CHI – Jay Cutler – 20/35, 222 yards, TD, INT
- PHI – Nick Foles – 21/25, 230 yards, 2 TD

**Top rushers**

- CHI – Matt Forte – 9 rushes, 29 yards
- PHI – LeSean McCoy – 18 rushes, 133 yards, 2 TD

**Top receivers**

- CHI – Martellus Bennett – 5 receptions, 85 yards
- PHI – Brent Celek – 3 receptions, 58 yards, TD

With the Dallas Cowboys defeating the Washington Redskins earlier in the day, their fate for the NFC East would have to wait to be decided the following week. However, that didn't stop the Eagles from routing the Chicago Bears 54–11 on Sunday Night Football to deny Chicago from clinching the NFC North. Nick Foles went 21/25 for 230 yards and two touchdowns. LeSean McCoy ran the ball 18 times for 133 yards and two touchdowns. Towards the end, the Eagles brought in bench players to finish the game. Bryce Brown ran for a 65-yard touchdown with 6:14 to go with Michael Vick at the quarterback helm. This was Michael Vick's final appearance as an Eagle. This was the first game in NFL history to end with a final score of 54–11.

With the convincing win, the Eagles improved to 9–6, and would face their archrivals, the Dallas Cowboys, the following Sunday night for the division title.

==== Week 17: at Dallas Cowboys ====
Week Seventeen: Philadelphia Eagles at Dallas Cowboys – Game summary

Quarter	1	2	3	4	Total
**Eagles**	3	14	0	7	**24**
Cowboys	0	10	6	6	**22**

at AT&T Stadium, Arlington, Texas

- Date: December 29
- Game time: 8:30 pm. EST/7:30 pm. CST
- Game weather: None (retractable roof closed)
- Game attendance: 91,166
- Referee: Gene Steratore
- TV announcers (NBC): Al Michaels, Cris Collinsworth and Michele Tafoya
- Recap, Game book

Game information

**First quarter**

- PHI – Alex Henery 46-yard field goal, 7:07. Eagles 3–0. **Drive: 7 plays, 48 yards, 3:35.**

**Second quarter**

- PHI – LeSean McCoy 3-yard pass from Nick Foles (Alex Henery kick), 14:13. Eagles 10–0. **Drive: 10 plays, 88 yards, 4:20.**
- DAL – Gavin Escobar 17-yard pass from Kyle Orton (Dan Bailey kick), 8:16. Eagles 10–7. **Drive: 6 plays, 66 yards, 2:51.**
- PHI – Brent Celek 14-yard pass from Nick Foles (Alex Henery kick), 1:19. Eagles 17–7. **Drive: 2 plays, 49 yards, 0:34.**
- DAL – Dan Bailey 44-yard field goal, 0:18. Eagles 17–10. **Drive: 8 plays, 54 yards, 1:01.**

**Third quarter**

- DAL – Dan Bailey 43-yard field goal, 8:59. Eagles 17–13. **Drive: 9 plays, 41 yards, 4:50.**
- DAL – Dan Bailey 36-yard field goal, 5:38. Eagles 17–16. **Drive: 4 plays, 2 yards, 2:06.**

**Fourth quarter**

- PHI – Bryce Brown 6-yard run (Alex Henery kick), 6:09. Eagles 24–16. **Drive: 11 plays, 60 yards, 5:37.**
- DAL – Dez Bryant 32-yard pass from Kyle Orton (pass failed), 3:50. Eagles 24–22. **Drive: 6 plays, 80 yards, 2:19.**

**Top passers**

- PHI – Nick Foles – 17/26, 263 yards, 2 TD
- DAL – Kyle Orton – 30/46, 358 yards, 2 TD, 2 INT

**Top rushers**

- PHI – LeSean McCoy – 27 rushes, 131 yards
- DAL – DeMarco Murray – 17 rushes, 51 yards

**Top receivers**

- PHI – Brent Celek – 3 receptions, 71 yards, TD
- DAL – Jason Witten – 12 receptions, 135 yards

This game ended when Kyle Orton threw an interception late in the fourth quarter. With the win, the Eagles improved to 10–6 and sealed the NFC East title and the #3 seed in the playoffs. They were also the third team in a row to defeat the Cowboys in the last game of the regular season on Sunday Night Football (Giants, 2011 and Redskins, 2012).

=== Standings ===
==== Division ====
NFC East
	W	L	T	PCT	DIV	CONF	PF	PA	STK
^{(3)} Philadelphia Eagles	10	6	0	.625	4–2	9–3	442	382	W2
Dallas Cowboys	8	8	0	.500	5–1	7–5	439	432	L1
New York Giants	7	9	0	.438	3–3	6–6	294	383	W2
Washington Redskins	3	13	0	.188	0–6	1–11	334	478	L8

==== Conference ====
NFC
#	Team	Division	W	L	T	PCT	DIV	CONF	SOS	SOV	STK
**Division winners**
1	Seattle Seahawks	West	13	3	0	.813	4–2	10–2	.490	.445	W1
2	Carolina Panthers	South	12	4	0	.750	5–1	9–3	.494	.451	W3
3	Philadelphia Eagles	East	10	6	0	.625	4–2	9–3	.453	.391	W2
4	Green Bay Packers	North	8	7	1	.531	3–2–1	6–5–1	.453	.371	W1
**Wild cards**
5	San Francisco 49ers	West	12	4	0	.750	5–1	9–3	.494	.414	W6
6	New Orleans Saints	South	11	5	0	.688	5–1	9–3	.516	.455	W1
**Did not qualify for the postseason**
7	Arizona Cardinals	West	10	6	0	.625	2–4	6–6	.531	.444	L1
8 (Note: Chicago defeated Dallas head-to-head (Week 14, 45–28).)	Chicago Bears	North	8	8	0	.500	2–4	4–8	.465	.469	L2
9	Dallas Cowboys	East	8	8	0	.500	5–1	7–5	.484	.363	L1
10 (Note: The NY Giants and Detroit finished with a better conference record than St. Louis.) (Note: The NY Giants defeated Detroit head-to-head (Week 16, 23–20 (OT)).)	New York Giants	East	7	9	0	.438	3–3	6–6	.520	.366	W2
11 (Note: Detroit finished with a better conference record than St. Louis.)	Detroit Lions	North	7	9	0	.438	4–2	6–6	.457	.402	L4
12	St. Louis Rams	West	7	9	0	.438	1–5	4–8	.551	.446	L1
13	Minnesota Vikings	North	5	10	1	.344	2–3–1	4–7–1	.512	.450	W1
14 (Note: Atlanta finished with a better conference record than Tampa Bay.)	Atlanta Falcons	South	4	12	0	.250	1–5	3–9	.553	.313	L2
15	Tampa Bay Buccaneers	South	4	12	0	.250	1–5	2–10	.574	.391	L3
16	Washington Redskins	East	3	13	0	.188	0–6	1–11	.516	.438	L8
**Tiebreakers** (Note: When breaking ties for three or more teams under the NFL's rules, they are first broken within divisions, then comparing only the highest-ranked remaining team from each division.)

== Postseason ==
=== Schedule ===
Week	Date	Opponent	Result	Record	Venue	Recap
Wild Card	January 4, 2014	New Orleans Saints (6)	L 24–26	0–1	Lincoln Financial Field	Recap

=== Game summaries ===
==== NFC Wild Card Playoffs: vs. (6) New Orleans Saints ====
NFC Wild Card Playoffs: (6) New Orleans Saints at (3) Philadelphia Eagles – Game summary

Quarter	1	2	3	4	Total
Saints	0	6	14	6	26
Eagles	0	7	7	10	24

at Lincoln Financial Field, Philadelphia, Pennsylvania

- Date: January 4, 2014
- Game time: 8:10 p.m. EST
- Game weather: Clear, 23 °F (−5 °C)
- Game attendance: 69,144
- Referee: Bill Vinovich
- TV announcers (NBC): Al Michaels, Cris Collinsworth and Michele Tafoya
- Recap, Game book

Game information

First quarter

- No scoring plays.

Second quarter

- NO – Shayne Graham 36-yard field goal, 8:37. Saints 3–0. Drive: 11 plays, 43 yards, 5:45.
- PHI – Riley Cooper 10-yard pass from Nick Foles (Alex Henery kick), 1:48. Eagles 7–3. Drive: 6 plays, 44 yards, 2:24.
- NO – Shayne Graham 46-yard field goal, 0:00. Eagles 7–6. Drive: 8 plays, 47 yards, 1:48.

Third quarter

- NO – Lance Moore 24-yard pass from Drew Brees (Shayne Graham kick), 10:08. Saints 13–7. Drive: 6 plays, 53 yards, 3:34.
- NO – Mark Ingram II 4-yard run (Shayne Graham kick), 3:54. Saints 20–7. Drive: 8 plays, 66 yards, 4:52.
- PHI – LeSean McCoy 1-yard run (Alex Henery kick), 0:32. Saints 20–14. Drive: 7 plays, 65 yards, 3:22.

Fourth quarter

- PHI – Alex Henery 31-yard field goal, 11:14. Saints 20–17. Drive: 7 plays, 28 yards, 2:59.
- NO – Shayne Graham 35-yard field goal, 8:04. Saints 23–17. Drive: 7 plays, 58 yards, 3:10.
- PHI – Zach Ertz 3-yard pass from Nick Foles (Alex Henery kick), 4:54. Eagles 24–23. Drive: 8 plays, 77 yards, 3:10.
- NO – Shayne Graham 32-yard field goal, 0:00. Saints 26–24. Drive: 10 plays, 34 yards, 4:54.

Top passers

- NO – Drew Brees – 20/30, 250 yards, TD, 2 INT
- PHI – Nick Foles – 23/33, 195 yards, 2 TD

Top rushers

- NO – Mark Ingram II – 18 rushes, 97 yards, TD
- PHI – LeSean McCoy – 21 rushes, 77 yards, TD

Top receivers

- NO – Jimmy Graham – 3 receptions, 44 yards
- PHI – Riley Cooper – 6 receptions, 68 yards, TD

The Eagles hosted the Saints in the Wild Card round. This was the first playoff game between the Saints and Eagles since the 2006 NFC Divisional Playoff game, which New Orleans won 26–24. The Saints had never won a road playoff game coming into this game in five previous attempts. Philadelphia led 24–23 with less than five minutes remaining. However, the Saints marched down the field to win it with a Shayne Graham field goal as time expired.

With the heartbreaking loss, the Eagles ended the season with an overall record of 10–7. This was their final appearance in the playoffs until 2017, when they went on to win Super Bowl LII.
