= Dave Kruger =

American football player (born 1990)

David Kruger
No. 69
- Position: Defensive end

Personal information
- Born: May 17, 1990 (age 36); Orem, Utah, U.S.
- Listed height: 6 ft 5 in (1.96 m)
- Listed weight: 285 lb (129 kg)

Career information
- College: Utah
- NFL draft: 2013: undrafted

Career history
- Cleveland Browns (2013)*
- * Offseason or practice squad member only

Dave Kruger (born May 17, 1990) is an American former professional football defensive end who is currently president of the Kruger Real Estate Group and advises individuals as a personal coach. He graduated from the University of Utah. He played college football at Utah, where he was on leadership committee for two years and captain in his senior year. He is the brother of Cleveland Browns outside linebacker Paul Kruger and Philadelphia Eagles defensive end Joe Kruger. He signed with the Cleveland Browns after the 2013 NFL draft as an undrafted free agent.

== Early life ==
Kruger attended Timpanogos High School in Orem, Utah. He was named to the All-State, All-Region and All-Valley in his senior season in high school. In his junior season at high school, he led the class 5A in sacks in the regular season, and he also had 13 sacks in his senior season. He also was ranked as the 48th prospect among defensive tackles in the nation by scout.com.

College recruiting
Name	Hometown	School	Height	Weight	40^{‡}	Commit date
David Kruger; Defensive tackle	Orem, Utah	Timpanogos High School	6 ft 5 in (1.96 m)	264 lb (120 kg)	5	Jan 18, 2008
David Kruger; Defensive tackle	Recruit ratings: Scout: Rivals:					
Overall recruit ranking: Scout: 48 (DT) Rivals: 25 (DT), 2 (UT)
‡ Refers to 40-yard dash; Note: In many cases, Scout, Rivals, 247Sports, On3, and ESPN may conflict in their listings of height, weight and 40 time.; In these cases, the average was taken. ESPN grades are on a 100-point scale.; Sources: "Utah Football Commitments". Rivals.; "2008 Utah Football Recruiting Commits". Scout.; "Scout.com Team Recruiting Rankings". Scout.; "2008 Team Ranking". Rivals.com.

== College career ==
He finished college with a total of 116 tackles, five sacks, and one forced fumble. In his freshman season, he was selected to the rivals.com second-team Freshman All-American team.

== Professional career ==
=== Cleveland Browns ===
On April 27, 2013, he signed Cleveland Browns as an undrafted free agent at the end of the 2013 NFL draft. He was waived on August 25, 2013.

== Personal life ==
He is the son of Paul and Jennifer Kruger, and has three brothers and two sisters. His brother Paul Kruger currently plays defensive end for the New Orleans Saints and his younger brother Joe Kruger is a defensive end for the Pittsburgh Steelers. He is now president of Kruger Real Estate Group and advises as personal coach for individuals.
