= Brent Celek =

American football player and executive (born 1985)

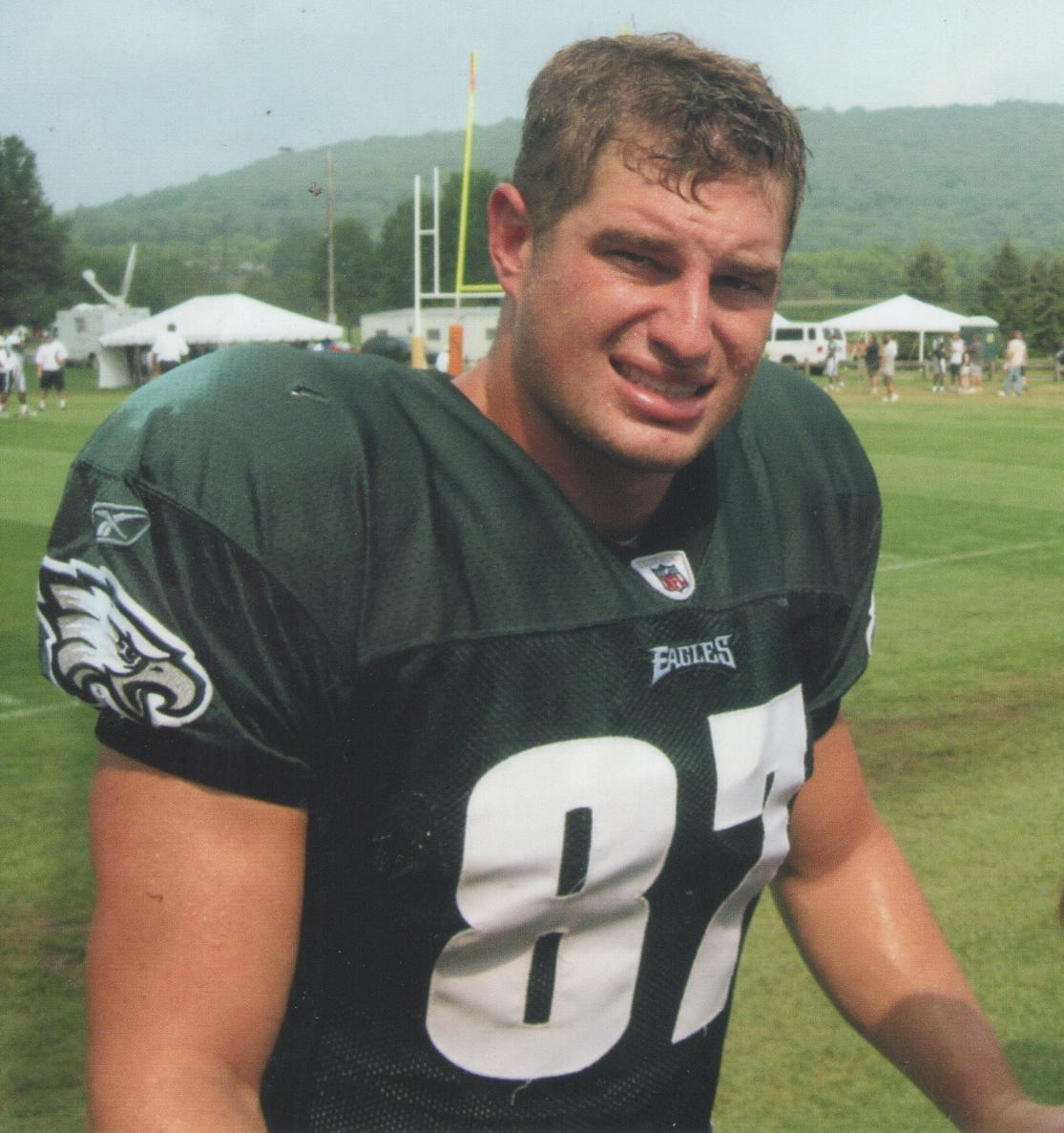
- Celek with the Philadelphia Eagles in 2011

Philadelphia Eagles
- Title: Personnel consultant

Personal information
- Born: January 25, 1985 (age 41); Cincinnati, Ohio, U.S.
- Listed height: 6 ft 4 in (1.93 m)
- Listed weight: 255 lb (116 kg)

Career information
- High school: La Salle (Cincinnati)
- College: Cincinnati (2003–2006)
- NFL draft: 2007: 5th round, 162nd overall pick

Career history

Playing
- Philadelphia Eagles (2007–2017)

Operations
- Philadelphia Eagles (2020–present) Personnel consultant

Awards and highlights
- As a player: Super Bowl champion (LII); As a staff member/executive: Super Bowl champion (LIX)

Career NFL statistics
- Receptions: 398
- Receiving yards: 4,998
- Receiving touchdowns: 31
- Stats at Pro Football Reference

Brent Steven Celek (/ˈsɛlɪk/; born January 25, 1985) is an American professional football executive and former tight end for the Philadelphia Eagles of the National Football League (NFL). He played college football for the Cincinnati Bearcats and was selected by the Eagles in the fifth round of the 2007 NFL draft. He played his entire 11-season career with the Eagles. Celek helped the Eagles win Super Bowl LII during the 2017 season; he subsequently retired that offseason.

== Early life ==
Celek played high school football at La Salle High School in Cincinnati, Ohio. He was named first-team all-district as both a junior and senior. He set a school record after catching a pass for 89 yards. He also lettered in track two years in the shot put and discus.

== College career ==
Celek played college football for the Cincinnati Bearcats, the first year under head coach Rick Minter and the following three seasons under Mark Dantonio. He won the UC Claude Rost Award (Most Valuable Player) and was a second-team All-Big East Conference selection. His four-year totals were 91 receptions for 1,135 yards (a 12.5 average) and 14 touchdowns, with the Bearcats earning victories his senior year in the International Bowl and his sophomore season in the Fort Worth Bowl.

== Professional career ==
Pre-draft measurables
Height	Weight	40-yard dash	10-yard split	20-yard split	20-yard shuttle	Three-cone drill	Vertical jump	Broad jump	Bench press
6 ft 3 7/8 in (1.93 m)	255 lb (116 kg)	4.79 s	1.64 s	2.75 s	4.31 s	7.20 s	33 in (0.84 m)	9 ft 4 in (2.84 m)	19 reps
All values from Pro Day

=== 2007 season ===
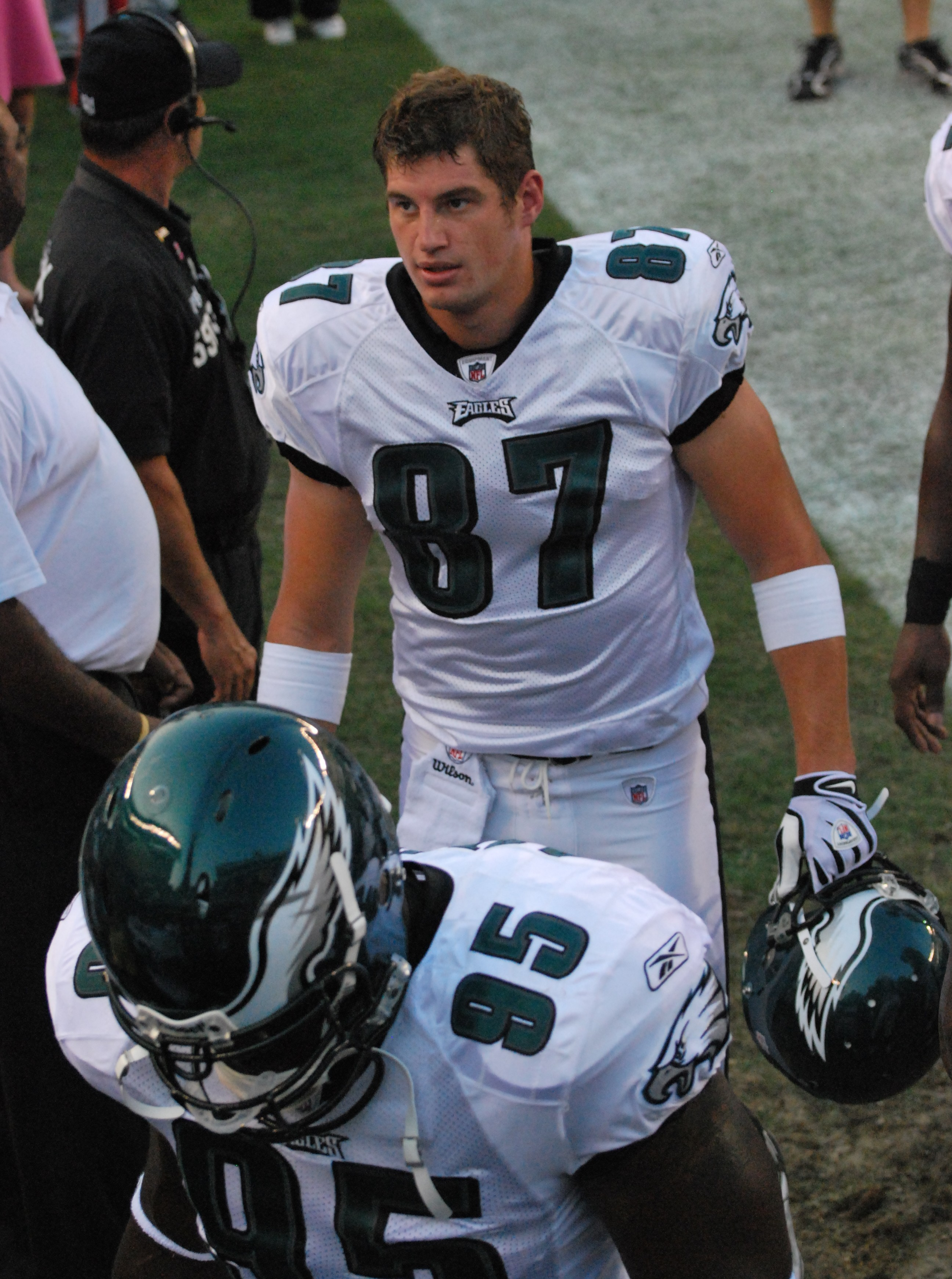
Celek in August 2009

After not having been invited to the 2007 NFL Scouting Combine, Celek was selected by the Philadelphia Eagles in the fifth round (162nd overall) of the 2007 NFL draft. He signed a four-year contract with the team on May 30, 2007.

=== 2008 season ===
In 2008, Celek set franchise records for yards in a game with 131 in week 9 and receptions in a playoff game with 10 in the NFC Championship game. He caught two touchdowns in a game against the Arizona Cardinals, and his 19 catches during the 2008–09 NFL playoffs were the third most in NFL history for a tight end.

=== 2009 season ===
Celek became the starting tight end for the Eagles after L. J. Smith departed via free agency to the Baltimore Ravens in 2009.

After scoring a touchdown in a week 9 game at home against the Dallas Cowboys, Celek was penalized for excessive celebration after teammate Jason Avant lifted his leg in order to impersonate the mascot for Captain Morgan rum. After the incident, the NFL quickly banned what turned out to be a covert ad campaign allegedly put on by the company, whereas any NFL player that is caught striking the "Captain Morgan" pose on camera during a regular-season game would result in a donation of $10,000 to the Gridiron Greats, a non-profit which helps retired NFL players with various hardships after leaving the game. The league chose not to penalize Celek, but stated that any future incident would be punished.

Celek signed six-year contract extension on December 1, 2009, to keep him under contract as an Eagle until after the 2016 season.

On December 27, 2009, in week 16 against the Denver Broncos, Celek made four catches for 121 yards and a touchdown, his third 100-yard game of the season. His 47-yard touchdown catch was the longest of his career.

After having a breakout year with 76 catches (a team high), 971 yards and eight touchdowns, Celek was named to the 2009 USA Today All-Joe Team.

=== 2010 season ===
In the 2010 season, Celek caught 42 passes for 511 yards and 4 touchdowns, including a then career-long 65-yard touchdown against the New York Giants in week 15, in the Miracle at the New Meadowlands.

=== 2011 season ===
Celek ended the season with 811 receiving yards, as quarterback Michael Vick's favorite target. He was one of three Eagle offensive players to start all 16 games, along with right tackle Todd Herremans and rookie center Jason Kelce. During the offseason, Celek was a passenger in a DUI car accident, where no one was hurt.

=== 2012 season ===
Celek finished the season with 57 receptions for 684 yards and one touchdown.

=== 2013 season ===
Celek finished the regular season with 32 receptions for 502 yards and six touchdowns after scoring a touchdown in each of the final two weeks. In the opening-round playoff loss to the New Orleans Saints, Celek caught two passes on three targets for 16 yards.

=== 2014 season ===
Going into the 2014 season, his eighth in the NFL, Celek stood second in Eagles team history in three tight end categories—all behind career leader Pete Retzlaff—in receiving yards (4,050), receptions (322), and touchdowns (26). Despite being the team's starter, Celek only had 90 yards in the team's first eight games (three of those games had no receptions), being used mostly for blocking. When Nick Foles went down due to injury, Celek saw more catches from backup Mark Sanchez. This was best showcased in a win over the Carolina Panthers, in which he caught 5 passes for 116 yards. He also caught his lone touchdown of the season from Sanchez, a 1-yard catch against the Giants in Week 17. Celek finished the season with 32 receptions for 340 yards and 1 touchdown, which was less than half of teammate Zach Ertz's total.

=== 2015 season ===
Celek remained the Eagles' starting tight end to start the 2015 season. Similarly to 2014, Celek had an uneventful start, only getting one catch on one target for six yards in three games. However, in a Week 4 divisional matchup against the Redskins, he scored his first touchdown of the season on a 10-yard catch and run from new quarterback Sam Bradford. Celek followed it up with 3 catches for 44 yards and another touchdown against the Saints. Celek only caught 2 passes for 11 yards in a game against the Panthers, and against the Cowboys he caught no passes. Celek did, however, make a crucial block on Dallas's defensive end Greg Hardy in overtime that allowed Bradford to throw the game-winning touchdown. Celek exploded onto the scene with 4 catches for 134 yards in a week 10 matchup against the Miami Dolphins, followed by 7 catches for 79 yards against the Buccaneers, and 2 catches for 10 yards and a touchdown against the Lions. Mark Sanchez started 2 of these games, and played in all 3, although Bradford threw 3 of Celek's 4 catches against Miami. Despite having only 35 targets, 8th on the team, Celek finished the year with 27 catches for 398 yards (3rd on the team) and 3 touchdowns (T-2nd on the team).

On January 26, 2016, Celek signed a three-year contract extension with the Eagles for $13 million, with $6 million guaranteed.

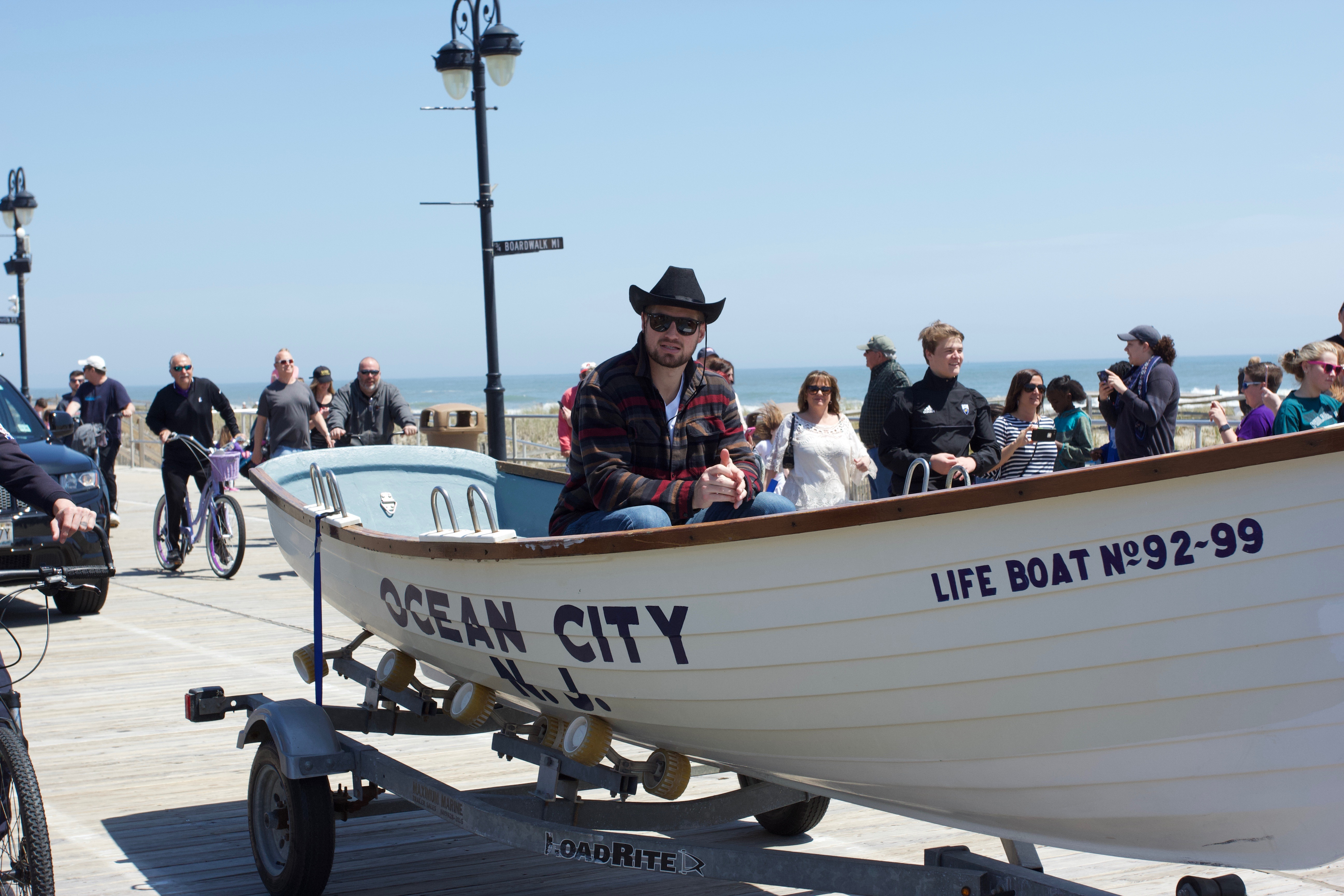
Celek in Ocean City, New Jersey

=== 2016 season ===
Celek played in all 16 games with 8 starts, recording 14 receptions for 155 yards. He was mainly used as a blocking specialist.

=== 2017 season ===
During the 2017 regular season, Celek recorded 13 receptions for 130 yards. Celek earned his first championship ring when the Eagles defeated the New England Patriots in Super Bowl LII by a score of 41–33; although he did not have any catches in the game, Celek did make a key block that allowed running back LeGarrette Blount to score a touchdown during the second quarter.

On March 13, 2018, Celek was released by the Eagles.

=== Retirement ===
On August 31, 2018, Celek announced his retirement from the NFL.

== NFL career statistics ==
Legend
**Bold**	Career high

=== Regular season ===
Year	Team	Games		Receiving					
Year	Team	GP	GS	Tgt	Rec	Yds	Avg	Lng	TD
2007	PHI	**16**	4	22	16	178	11.1	29	1
2008	PHI	**16**	7	38	27	318	11.8	44	1
2009	PHI	**16**	15	**112**	**76**	**971**	12.8	47	**8**
2010	PHI	**16**	15	79	42	511	12.2	65	4
2011	PHI	**16**	**16**	98	62	811	13.1	**73**	5
2012	PHI	15	14	88	57	684	12.0	34	1
2013	PHI	**16**	15	51	32	502	**15.7**	42	6
2014	PHI	**16**	15	51	32	340	10.6	37	1
2015	PHI	**16**	13	35	27	398	14.7	60	3
2016	PHI	**16**	8	19	14	155	11.1	24	0
2017	PHI	**16**	10	24	13	130	10.0	28	1
		175	132	617	398	4,998	12.6	73	31

=== Playoffs ===
Year	Team	Games		Receiving					
Year	Team	GP	GS	Tgt	Rec	Yds	Avg	Lng	TD
2008	PHI	**3**	**3**	**22**	**19**	**151**	7.9	**31**	**3**
2009	PHI	1	1	5	3	59	**19.7**	26	0
2010	PHI	1	1	4	2	25	12.5	16	0
2013	PHI	1	1	3	2	16	8.0	24	0
2017	PHI	**3**	1	2	1	6	6.0	6	0
		9	7	36	27	257	9.5	31	3

== Post-playing career ==
On February 7, 2020, Celek was hired as a personnel consultant in the Eagles' football operations department, alongside former teammate Darren Sproles. He is also working in real estate.

== Personal life ==
Celek is the son of Steve and Debbie Celek and the oldest of five children. Brent's younger brother, Garrett, played tight end at Michigan State under coach Mark Dantonio, who coached Brent when he played for Cincinnati. After going undrafted, Garrett signed with the San Francisco 49ers.
