= Riley Cooper =

American football player (born 1987)

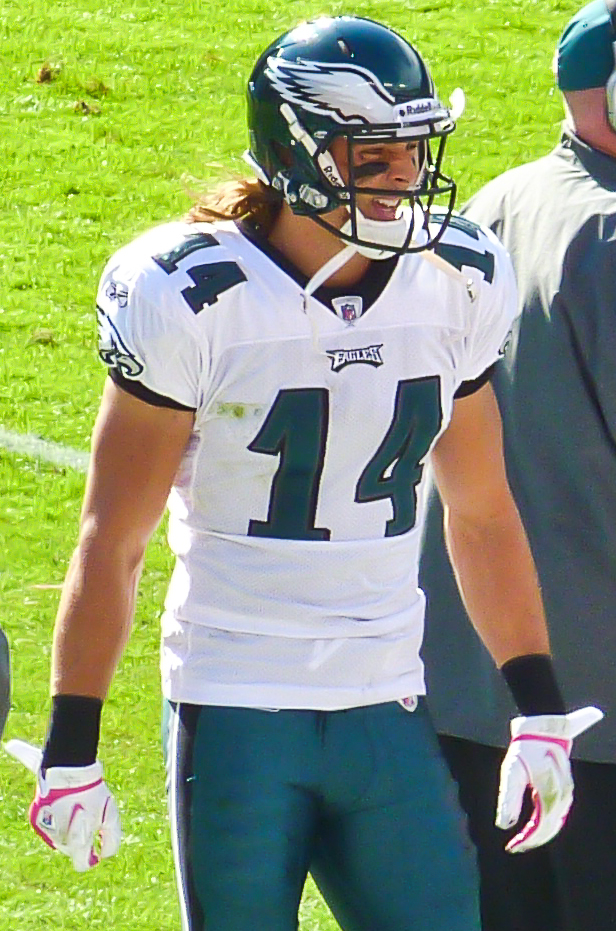
- Cooper with the Philadelphia Eagles in 2011

No. 14
- Position: Wide receiver

Personal information
- Born: September 9, 1987 (age 39); Oklahoma City, Oklahoma, U.S.
- Listed height: 6 ft 4 in (1.93 m)
- Listed weight: 230 lb (104 kg)

Career information
- High school: Clearwater Central Catholic (Clearwater, Florida)
- College: Florida (2006–2009)
- NFL draft: 2010: 5th round, 159th overall pick

Career history
- Philadelphia Eagles (2010–2015)

Awards and highlights
- 2× BCS national champion (2006, 2008); Second-team All-SEC (2009)

Career NFL statistics
- Receptions: 169
- Receiving yards: 2,418
- Receiving touchdowns: 18
- Stats at Pro Football Reference

Riley Cooper (born September 9, 1987) is an American former professional football player who was a wide receiver for six seasons with the Philadelphia Eagles of the National Football League (NFL). He played college football for the Florida Gators, where he was a member of two BCS National Championship teams. He was selected by the Eagles in the fifth round of the 2010 NFL draft.

== Early life ==
Cooper was born in Oklahoma City, Oklahoma, the son of Larry and Monica Cooper. He grew up in Clearwater, Florida, where he attended Clearwater Central Catholic High School and played high school football and baseball for the Central Catholic Marauders. Cooper was a three-time all-county selection, received all-state honors as wide receiver and free safety after his junior and senior seasons, and was his football team's captain as a senior. Rivals.com ranked him as the tenth-best athlete in the 2006 college football signing class. Cooper was selected by the Philadelphia Phillies in the 15th round (457 overall pick) of the 2006 Major League Baseball draft. He did not sign with the Phillies because he chose to attend the University of Florida to play football.

Cooper's younger sister, Lindsey, also attended the University of Florida, where she played for the Florida Gators women's soccer team. Lindsey is married to former University of Florida linebacker and current Tampa Bay Buccaneers linebacker Alex Anzalone.

== College career ==
Cooper accepted an athletic scholarship to attend the University of Florida in Gainesville, Florida, where he played for coach Urban Meyer's Gators football teams from 2006 to 2009.

During his freshman season in 2006, Cooper served as the "gunner" on special teams and played in 13 of the 14 games for the Gators. He established a then-career-high with three receptions (all touchdowns) in the romp over Western Carolina. Cooper was nominated SEC Freshman of the Week following his performance. He was the first Gator freshman wide receiver to have three touchdown catches in a game since Jabar Gaffney accomplished the feat in 2000. Cooper saw action in Florida's triumphs over Alabama, Tennessee and Kentucky, mostly on special teams. He made his collegiate debut with one reception for 10 yards against Central Florida. Cooper gained 92 yards on four receptions, three of which went for touchdowns, on the season.

As a sophomore, Cooper appeared in 10 games during the year with two starts in home contests against Tennessee and Auburn. He missed games against Georgia and Vanderbilt as a result of a broken finger suffered in the first quarter at Kentucky. He dressed but did not compete in the Capital One Bowl against Michigan, which the Gators lost. Cooper hauled in a career-high and team-best four catches for 122 yards and two touchdowns, including a career-long 59-yard grab in his 2007 debut against Western Kentucky. Cooper caught eight passes, gaining 182 yards and scoring two total touchdowns in 2007.

Cooper appeared in fourteen games for the Gators in his junior season, starting all but two (against Hawaii and Florida State). He hauled in a key touchdown, along with a season-high 51-yard reception, that put Florida in scoring position during the SEC Championship Game against Alabama. He totaled 28 yards on two receptions in the BCS National Championship Game, including a crucial 17-yard catch from Tim Tebow on 3rd-and-12. Cooper amassed 261 total yards on 18 receptions, three of which were touchdowns.

In his senior season, Cooper totaled 961 yards on 51 receptions, with nine touchdowns and an average of 18.8 yards per catch.

=== Baseball ===
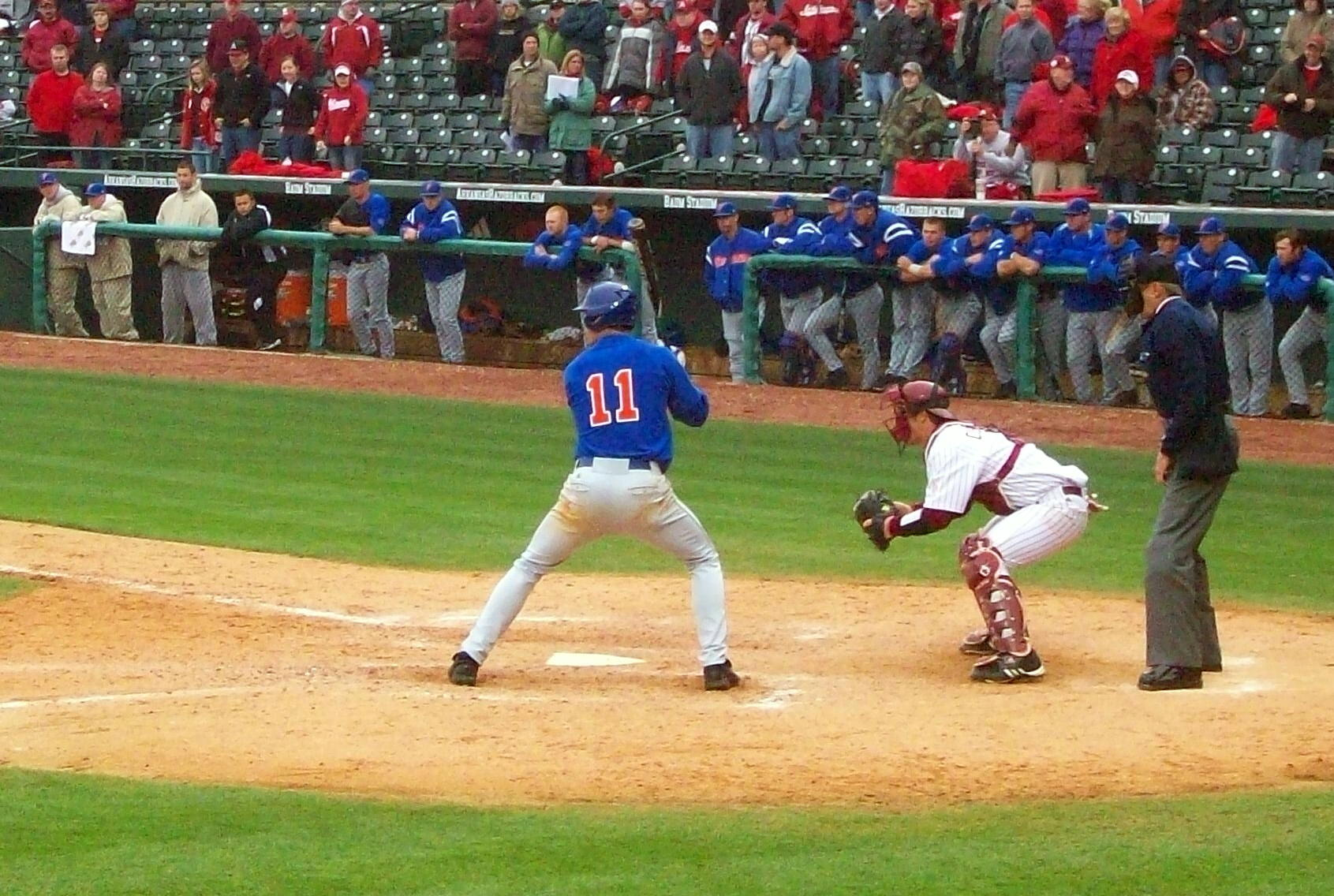
Cooper batting for the Florida Gators baseball team

Cooper was drafted by the Philadelphia Phillies out of high school in the 15th round of the 2006 MLB draft. Cooper passed on the contract and played college baseball for the Florida Gators baseball team as an outfielder. He was drafted again in 2009–in the 25th round, the 754th player chosen that year–after which he signed a deal to play baseball for the Texas Rangers of Major League Baseball but decided to delay his MLB career and returned to play football for the Gators football team in 2009. He was scheduled to get a physical and receive half of his $250,000 signing bonus on January 17, but declined and told the Rangers that his focus was football, thus voiding his baseball contract.

== Professional career ==
Pre-draft measurables
Height	Weight	Arm length	Hand span	40-yard dash	10-yard split	20-yard split	20-yard shuttle	Three-cone drill	Vertical jump	Broad jump
6 ft 3 3/8 in (1.91 m)	222 lb (101 kg)	32 5/8 in (0.83 m)	10 3/8 in (0.26 m)	4.56 s	1.60 s	2.64 s	4.15 s	6.73 s	33.0 in (0.84 m)	9 ft 6 in (2.90 m)
All values from NFL Combine/Pro Day

=== 2010 season ===
Cooper was selected by the Philadelphia Eagles in the fifth round (159th overall) of the 2010 NFL draft. He was signed to a four-year contract on July 13, 2010.

Cooper caught his first NFL touchdown in a game against the Tennessee Titans.

He ended his first season with 7 receptions for 116 yards and one touchdown.

=== 2011 season ===
He scored his second touchdown of his career against the New York Giants in week 10 of the 2011 NFL season on an 8-yard completion from Vince Young.

Coming off the bench, he posted 16 receptions for 315 yards and a touchdown.

=== 2012 season ===
Cooper broke his collarbone on July 28, 2012, and missed time, but returned mid-season. He made a one-handed catch for a touchdown against the Dallas Cowboys. He scored again in the second meeting of the season against the Cowboys, again on a one-handed catch.

While mostly a reserve, he ended the season with 23 receptions for 248 yards and 3 touchdowns.

=== 2013 season ===
Cooper had a breakout season during the last year of his rookie contract. He started the season used mostly for blocking, rather than for his receiving ability. In the first 5 weeks, he posted 8 catches for 93 yards and 1 touchdown with Michael Vick at quarterback.

Cooper had a career game in Week 9 against the Oakland Raiders, where he posted 5 receptions for 139 yards (27.8 avg) and 3 touchdowns.

After a slow start, Cooper put together a solid season with 47 receptions for 835 yards and 8 touchdowns, all career highs. He ended the season tied for third in the NFL with 17.8 yards per catch.

=== 2014 season ===
On February 27, Cooper signed an extension deal valued at $25 million over five years, with $8 million fully guaranteed. During the 2014 NFL season, Cooper caught 55 of 95 targets for 577 yards and 3 touchdowns.

=== 2015 season ===
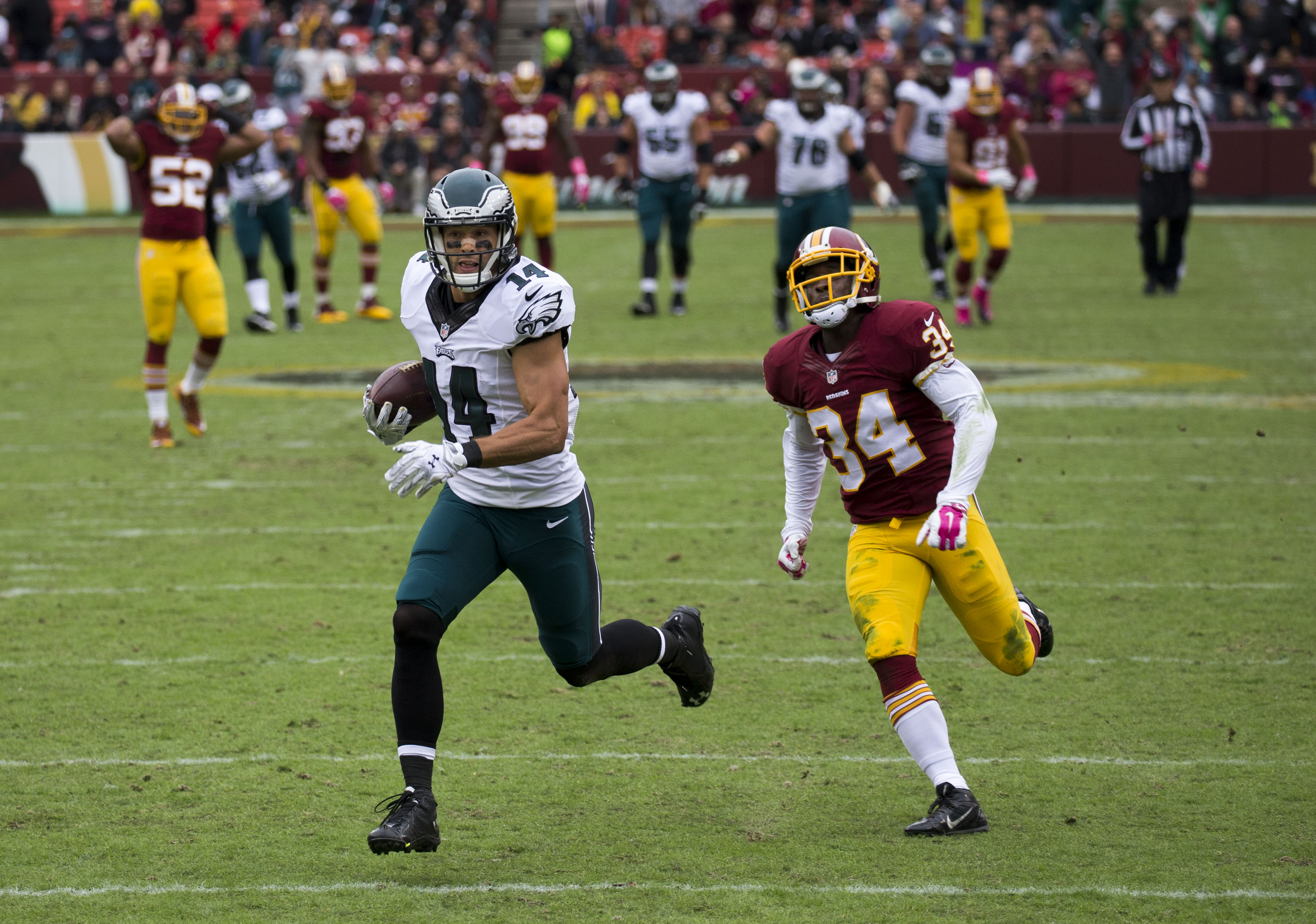
Cooper against the Washington Redskins on October 4, 2015

Cooper continued to play with the Eagles during the 2015 season. In a game against the Dallas Cowboys on November 9, Cooper left the game with a foot injury. Cooper finished the season with 21 receptions off 41 targets for 327 yards and 2 touchdowns. Cooper didn't record a single reception in 7 of 16 games.

He was released by the Eagles on February 8, 2016. Cooper then spent the entire 2016 season out of football.

On December 12, 2017, Cooper announced his retirement from the NFL via Twitter.

== NFL career statistics ==
Legend
**Bold**	Career high

=== Regular season ===
Year	Team	Games		Receiving					
Year	Team	GP	GS	Tgt	Rec	Yds	Avg	Lng	TD
2010	PHI	13	2	18	7	116	16.6	37	1
2011	PHI	**16**	3	35	16	315	**19.7**	58	1
2012	PHI	11	5	47	23	248	10.8	23	3
2013	PHI	**16**	15	84	47	**835**	17.8	**63**	**8**
2014	PHI	**16**	**16**	**95**	**55**	577	10.5	50	3
2015	PHI	**16**	13	41	21	327	15.6	62	2
		88	54	320	169	2,418	14.3	63	18

=== Playoffs ===
Year	Team	Games		Receiving					
Year	Team	GP	GS	Tgt	Rec	Yds	Avg	Lng	TD
2010	PHI	**1**	0	4	2	18	9.0	11	0
2013	PHI	**1**	**1**	**8**	**6**	**68**	**11.3**	**22**	**1**
		2	1	12	8	86	10.8	22	1

== Controversy ==
In July 2013, a video surfaced of Cooper being denied backstage access at a Kenny Chesney concert in the previous month. The video showed Cooper yelling a racial epithet at the bouncers who denied him backstage. In the dispute with a black security guard at the concert, Cooper said, "I will jump that fence and fight every nigger here." In the aftermath, the Philadelphia Eagles fined Cooper an undisclosed amount, but still allowed him to resume activities with the team.

== See also ==
- List of Florida Gators in the NFL draft
- List of Philadelphia Eagles players
