= Shaun Huls =

American sports performance coach and administrator

- Born: August 17, 1977 (age 49)
- Education: University of Nebraska; California University of Pennsylvania
- Occupations: Sports performance coach and administrator
- Employer: Virginia Tech (2026-present)
- Children: 2

Shaun Huls (born August 17, 1977) is an American sports performance coach and administrator who serves as Director of Sports Science for Virginia Tech Football. He previously served as Director of Performance for the Cleveland Browns of the National Football League (NFL) from 2020-2026 and spent seven seasons with the Philadelphia Eagles from 2013 to 2019, including the Eagles' first Super Bowl Championship season, Super Bowl LII. Prior to his NFL career, Huls worked with the U.S. Naval Special Warfare Command and collegiate athletics.

== Career ==
=== Collegiate athletics ===
Huls began his career at the University of Nebraska–Lincoln, supporting Husker Power's football strength and conditioning as a student assistant, while leading the baseball strength and conditioning program. Huls earned the 2001 Tom Heiser Award and Strength Coach of the Year Award. During his tenure, Nebraska won two baseball Big 12 Championships, two football Big 12 Championships, and the 1997 Football National Championship.

From 2002 to 2003, Huls was the head strength coach for baseball and assistant strength coach for football at the University of Nevada. He also coordinated performance nutrition across the university's athletics programs.

In 2003, Huls joined Hampton University, where he led the university's first interdisciplinary performance program as the Director of Athletic Performance. During his tenure, the Pirates won three Football MEAC Championship titles and back-to-back Black College National Championships in 2004 and 2005.

In 2026, Huls joined Virginia Tech Football as Director of Sports Science.

=== U.S. Naval Special Warfare Command ===
In 2006, Huls joined the U.S. Naval Special Warfare Command as Head Strength and Conditioning Coach and Combatives Coordinator, supporting SEAL Team operators through physical preparation, injury-prevention programming, and combative training during Global War on Terror deployments for seven years.

=== National Football League ===
In 2013, Huls was hired by the Philadelphia Eagles as the NFL's first Sports Science Coordinator under head coach Chip Kelly. He later served as Sports Science and Reconditioning Coordinator, and beginning 2016, he was named Director of High Performance, where he led the development of the sports science, player development, and return-to-play model. Huls remained on staff under head coach Doug Pederson. He contributed to two NFC East Championships and the Eagles' first Super Bowl Championship at Super Bowl LII in 2018.

In 2020, Huls was hired by the Cleveland Browns as Director of Performance. In this role, he led an integrated program across strength and conditioning, sport science, nutrition, player development, and coach development. Huls designed the Regen Center (2022) and Player Development & Performance Center (2024) at the Browns CrossCountry Mortgage Campus. He contributed to two AFC playoff bids in 2020 and 2023, and was the Cleveland Browns’ nominee for the 2024 NFL Salute to Service Award.

== Education ==
- Bachelor of Science in Health Science, University of Nebraska, 2000
- Master of Science in Exercise Science and Sport Psychology, California University of Pennsylvania, 2016

== Other ==
Huls is a faculty member for the Mission Critical Teams Institute. He is a published researcher and advisor. He has presented at academic and professional conferences hosted by Harvard, Wharton, USC, Notre Dame, and global performance summits. Outside of the profession, he has experience in mixed martial arts and Brazilian Jiu-Jitsu. Huls is married with two children.
