= Joe Kruger =

American football player (born 1992)

No. 73
- Position: Defensive end

Personal information
- Born: June 4, 1992 (age 34); Orem, Utah, U.S.
- Listed height: 6 ft 6 in (1.98 m)
- Listed weight: 269 lb (122 kg)

Career information
- High school: Pleasant Grove (UT)
- College: Utah
- NFL draft: 2013: 7th round, 212th overall pick

Career history
- Philadelphia Eagles (2013); San Diego Chargers (2014)*; Green Bay Packers (2014)*; Pittsburgh Steelers (2014–2015)*
- * Offseason or practice squad member only
- Stats at Pro Football Reference

Jonathan Wells Kruger (born June 4, 1992) is an American former professional football defensive end. He was selected by the Philadelphia Eagles in 2013. He played college football at Utah. He is the younger brother of outside linebacker Paul Kruger and defensive end Dave Kruger.

== Early life ==
He attended Pleasant Grove High School in Pleasant Grove, Utah. He was a first-team and all-conference in his senior season. He was ranked among the top 25 defensive end prospects by Rivals.com.

College recruiting
Name	Hometown	School	Height	Weight	40^{‡}	Commit date
Joe Kruger; Defensive end	Orem, Utah	Pleasant Grove High School	6 ft 7 in (2.01 m)	275 lb (125 kg)	4.83	Nov 18, 2008
Joe Kruger; Defensive end	Recruit ratings: Scout: Rivals:					
Overall recruit ranking: Scout: 95 (DE) Rivals: 23 (DE), NR (National), 3 (Utah)
‡ Refers to 40-yard dash; Note: In many cases, Scout, Rivals, 247Sports, On3, and ESPN may conflict in their listings of height, weight and 40 time.; In these cases, the average was taken. ESPN grades are on a 100-point scale.; Sources: "2010 Utah Utes Football Commitments". Rivals.; "2010 Utah Football Recruiting Commits". Scout.; "Scout.com Team Recruiting Rankings". Scout.; "2010 Team Ranking". Rivals.com.

== College career ==
He played college football at Utah. He finished college with a total of 69 tackles, 9 sacks, 3 forced fumbles and one interception. On January 3, 2013, Kruger announced he would skip his senior season to enter the 2013 NFL draft.

== Professional career ==
Pre-draft measurables
Height	Weight	Arm length	Hand span	40-yard dash	Vertical jump	Broad jump	Bench press
6 ft 7 in (2.01 m)	269 lb (122 kg)	34 3/8 in (0.87 m)	10 in (0.25 m)	4.83 s	34.0 in (0.86 m)	9 ft 9 in (2.97 m)	24 reps
All values from the NFL Combine

=== Philadelphia Eagles ===
Kruger was selected in the seventh round of the 2013 NFL draft, (212th overall), by the Philadelphia Eagles. He was placed on injured reserve on August 30, 2013, and missed the 2013 season. He was released on August 23, 2014.

=== San Diego Chargers ===
Kruger was signed by the San Diego Chargers on August 25, 2014. He was released on August 29, 2014.

=== Green Bay Packers ===
Kruger was signed to the Green Bay Packers practice squad on October 7, 2014. He was released on November 3, 2014.

=== Pittsburgh Steelers ===
Kruger was signed to the Pittsburgh Steelers practice squad on November 24, 2014. He was waived as a part of final roster cuts on September 3, 2015.

== Personal ==
He has two older brothers: Paul and Dave Kruger.
