= List of 2012 NFL draft early entrants =

This list of 2012 NFL draft early entrants consists of college football players who were juniors or redshirt sophomores and were declared eligible to be selected in the 2012 NFL draft. A college football player who completed high school at least three years prior can renounce his remaining NCAA eligibility and enter the draft. Players who met these requirements had until January 15, 2012, to declare their intention to forgo their remaining collegiate eligibility.

A total of 65 underclassmen were granted eligibility for the 2012 draft, eclipsing the previous record from 2011 of 56. In addition to these underclassmen, at least three players who were considered seniors opted not to pursue an additional season of college eligibility for which they may have been eligible.

== Complete list of players ==
The following players were granted special eligibility to enter the 2012 draft:

| Name | Position | School | Drafted by | Draft pos. |
|---|---|---|---|---|
| Alvester Alexander | RB | Wyoming | — | — |
| Dwayne Allen | DT | Clemson | Indianapolis Colts | 64 |
| Edwin Baker | RB | Michigan State | San Diego | 250 |
| Mike Ball | WR | Nevada | — | — |
| Jamison Berryhill | RB | Texas | — | — |
| Justin Blackmon | WR | Oklahoma State | Jacksonville | 5 |
| Michael Brockers^{[a]} | DT | LSU | St. Louis | 14 |
| Bryce Brown | RB | Kansas State | Philadelphia | 229 |
| Vontaze Burfict | LB | Arizona State | — | — |
| Orson Charles | TE | Georgia | Cincinnati | 116 |
| Morris Claiborne | CB | LSU | Dallas | 6 |
| Fletcher Cox | DT | Mississippi State | Philadelphia | 12 |
| David DeCastro | G | Stanford | Pittsburgh | 24 |
| Tiree Eure | TE | Minnesota | — | — |
| Marcus Forston | DT | Miami | — | — |
| Stephon Gilmore | CB | South Carolina | Buffalo | 10 |
| Chris Givens | WR | Wake Forest | St. Louis | 96 |
| Dorian Graham | WR | Syracuse | — | — |
| Robert Griffin III | QB | Baylor | Washington | 2 |
| Jewel Hampton | RB | Southern Illinois | — | — |
| Cliff Harris | CB | Oregon | — | — |
| Dont'a Hightower | LB | Alabama | New England | 25 |
| Stephen Hill | WR | Georgia Tech | NY Jets | 43 |
| Ronnie Hillman^{[a]} | RB | San Diego State | Denver | 67 |
| Max Holloway | DE | Boston College | — | — |
| Jayron Hosley | CB | Virginia Tech | NY Giants | 94 |
| Janzen Jackson | S | McNeese State | — | — |
| LaMichael James | RB | Oregon | San Francisco | 61 |
| Alshon Jeffery | WR | South Carolina | Chicago | 45 |
| Aldarius Johnson | WR | Miami | — | — |
| Damaris Johnson | WR | Tulsa | — | — |
| Chandler Jones | DE | Syracuse | New England | 21 |
| Matt Kalil | OT | USC | Minnesota | 4 |
| Dre Kirkpatrick | CB | Alabama | Cincinnati Bengals | 17 |
| Peter Konz | C | Wisconsin | Atlanta | 55 |
| Luke Kuechly | LB | Boston College | Carolina | 9 |
| Ronnell Lewis | LB | Oklahoma | Detroit | 125 |
| Andrew Luck | QB | Stanford | Indianapolis | 1 |
| Terrell Manning | LB | NC State | Green Bay | 163 |
| Jonathan Martin | OT | Stanford | Miami | 42 |
| Bobby Massie | OT | Ole Miss | Arizona | 112 |
| Whitney Mercilus | DE | Illinois | Houston | 26 |
| Lamar Miller^{[a]} | RB | Miami | Miami | 97 |
| Brock Osweiler | QB | Arizona State | Denver | 57 |
| Eric Page | WR | Toledo | — | — |
| Donte Paige-Moss | DE | North Carolina | — | — |
| Nick Perry | DE | USC | Green Bay | 28 |
| Bernard Pierce | RB | Temple | Baltimore | 84 |
| Ken Plue | G | Purdue | — | — |
| Dontari Poe | DT | Memphis | Kansas City | 11 |
| Chris Polk^{[b]} | RB | Washington | — | — |
| Rueben Randle | WR | LSU | NY Giants | 63 |
| Riley Reiff | OT | Iowa | Detroit | 23 |
| Trent Richardson | RB | Alabama | Cleveland | 3 |
| Josh Robinson | CB | UCF | Minnesota | 66 |
| Mohamed Sanu | WR | Rutgers | Cincinnati Bengals | 83 |
| Darrell Scott | RB | USF | — | — |
| Tommy Streeter | WR | Miami | Baltimore | 198 |
| Darron Thomas | QB | Oregon | — | — |
| Johnny Thomas | S | Oklahoma State | — | — |
| Phillip Thomas | S | Syracuse | — | — |
| Barrett Trotter | QB | Auburn | — | — |
| Robert Turbin^{[b]} | RB | Utah State | Seattle | 106 |
| Kenny Turner^{[b]} | RB | New Mexico State | — | — |
| Olivier Vernon | DE | Miami | Miami | 72 |
| Brandon Washington | G | Miami | Philadelphia | 200 |
| David Wilson | RB | Virginia Tech | NY Giants | 32 |
| Jerel Worthy | DT | Michigan State | Green Bay | 51 |

Notes

^{a} This player is a third-year sophomore.
^{b} This player in not technically an underclassman, but he has opted to forego an additional season of college eligibility.

== Number of players granted special eligibility by year ==
Undergraduates admitted to the NFL draft each year:

| Year | Number |
|---|---|
| 2012 | 65 |
| 2011 | 56 |
| 2010 | 53 |
| 2009 | 46 |
| 2008 | 53 |
| 2007 | 40 |
| 2006 | 52 |
| 2005 | 51 |
| 2004 | 43 |
| 2003 | 47 |
