= List of 2011 NFL draft early entrants =

This list of 2011 NFL draft early entrants consists of college football players who are juniors or redshirt sophomores who have been declared eligible to be selected in the 2011 NFL draft. A player can forfeit his remaining NCAA eligibility and declare for the draft. The deadline to declare for the 2011 draft was January 15, 2011.

== Complete list of players ==
A record 56 players were granted special eligibility in 2011:

Name	Position	School	Drafted by	Draft pos.
Darvin Adams	WR	Auburn	—	—
Marvin Austin	DT	North Carolina	New York Giants	52
Akeem Ayers	LB	UCLA	Tennessee	39
Jonathan Baldwin	WR	Pittsburgh	Kansas City	26
Da'Quan Bowers	DE	Clemson	Tampa Bay	51
DeAndre Brown	WR	Southern Miss	—	—
Brandon Burton	CB	Utah	Minnesota	139
Jurrell Casey	DT	USC	Tennessee	77
John Clay	RB	Wisconsin	—	—
Nick Claytor	OT	Georgia Tech	—	—
Randall Cobb	WR	Kentucky	Green Bay	64
Marcell Dareus	DE	Alabama	Buffalo	3
Tandon Doss	WR	Indiana	Baltimore	123
Darren Evans	RB	Virginia Tech	—	—
Nick Fairley	DT	Auburn	Detroit	13
Blaine Gabbert	QB	Missouri	Jacksonville	10
A. J. Green	WR	Georgia	Cincinnati	4
Tori Gurley	WR	South Carolina	—	—
Lawrence Guy	DT	Arizona State	Green Bay	233
Jamel Hamler	WR	Fresno State	—	—
Jamie Harper	RB	Clemson	Tennessee	130
Brandon Harris	CB	Miami	Houston	60
Will Hill	S	Florida	—	—
Justin Houston	LB	Georgia	Kansas City	70
Henry Hynoski	FB	Pittsburgh	—	—
Mark Ingram II	RB	Alabama	New Orleans	28
Julio Jones	WR	Alabama	Atlanta	6
Taiwan Jones	RB	Eastern Washington	Oakland	125
Thomas Keiser	LB	Stanford	—	—
Mikel Leshoure	RB	Illinois	Detroit	57
Dion Lewis	RB	Pittsburgh	Philadelphia	149
Javes Lewis	CB	Oregon	—	—
Greg Little	WR	North Carolina	Cleveland	59
Corey Liuget	DT	Illinois	San Diego	18
Ryan Mallett	QB	Arkansas	New England	74
Rahim Moore	CB	UCLA	Denver	45
Cam Newton	QB	Auburn	Carolina	1
Zane Parr	DE	Virginia	—	—
Patrick Peterson	CB	LSU	Arizona	5
Robert Quinn	DE	North Carolina	St. Louis	14
Stevan Ridley	RB	LSU	New England	73
Jacquizz Rodgers	RB	Oregon State	Atlanta	145
Kyle Rudolph	TE	Notre Dame	Minnesota	43
Robert Sands	S	West Virginia	Cincinnati	134
Tyler Sash	S	Iowa	New York	198
Sealver Siliga	DT	Utah	—	—
Aldon Smith	DE	Missouri	San Francisco	7
Torrey Smith	WR	Maryland	Baltimore	58
Tyron Smith	OT	USC	Dallas	9
Jerrard Tarrant	S	Georgia Tech	—	—
Jordan Todman	RB	Connecticut	San Diego	183
Shane Vereen	RB	California	New England	56
J. J. Watt	DE	Wisconsin	Houston	11
Muhammad Wilkerson	DT	Temple	N.Y. Jets	30
Aaron Williams	CB	Texas	Buffalo	34
Ryan Williams	RB	Virginia Tech	Arizona	38
Martez Wilson	LB	Illinois	New Orleans	72

== Number of players granted special eligibility by year ==
Undergraduates admitted to the NFL draft each year:

Year	Number
2011	56
2010	53
2009	46
2008	53
2007	40
2006	52
2005	51
2004	43
2003	47
2002	38
