= 2012 Philadelphia Eagles season =

80th season in franchise history; final one under Andy Reid

- Owner: Jeffrey Lurie
- General manager: Howie Roseman
- Head coach: Andy Reid
- Home stadium: Lincoln Financial Field

Results
- Record: 4–12
- Division place: 4th NFC East
- Playoffs: Did not qualify

Uniform
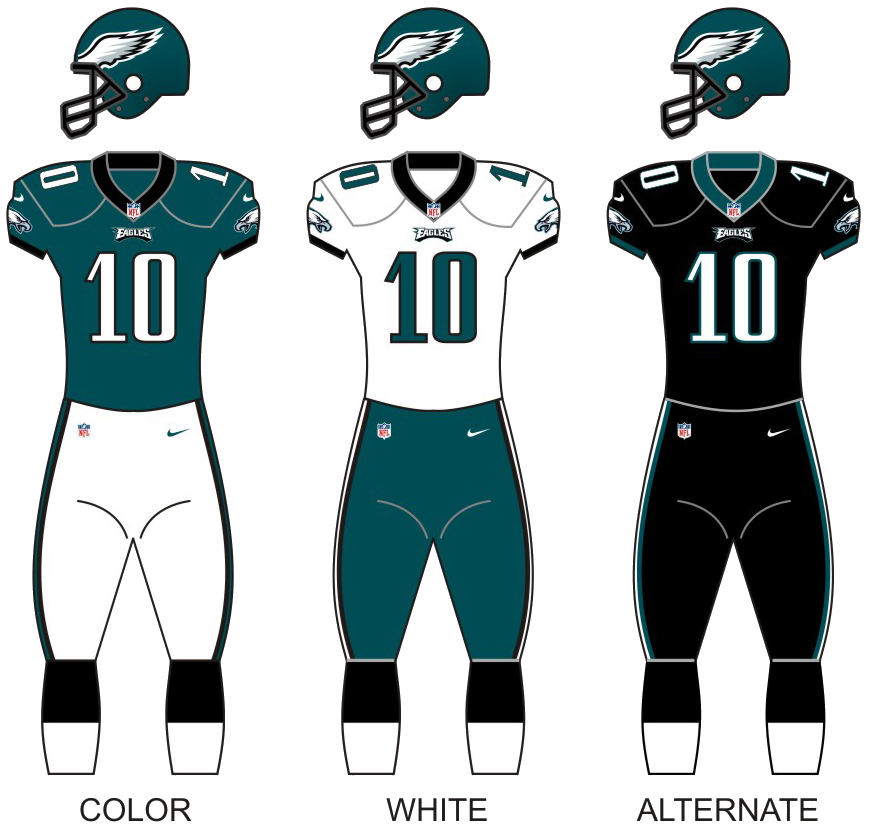

The 2012 season was the Philadelphia Eagles' 80th in the National Football League (NFL), their 14th and final season under head coach Andy Reid, and their 10th playing home games at Lincoln Financial Field. Despite starting the season 3–1, the team would massively struggle. The team failed to improve on their 8–8 record from 2011, and went 1–11 in their final 12 games en route to a 4–12 record, their worst record since 1998 when they won only three games and also finished with a losing record for the first time since 2005. Additionally, their four wins were not only by less than three points each, but all four of them had their deciding scores being acquired after the two-minute warnings. On December 31, 2012, Reid was fired after 14 seasons as the Eagles' head coach. Also, for the fourth consecutive season, the team the Eagles played in their home opener went on to win the Super Bowl.

The Eagles acquired the 12th overall pick in the 2012 NFL draft, with which they selected defensive tackle Fletcher Cox, from the Seattle Seahawks in exchange for the 15th overall selection, along with a pick in each of the fourth and sixth rounds.

== Personnel changes ==
On January 8, cornerbacks coach Johnnie Lynn was fired. On January 11, Ryan Grigson, the Eagles' director of player personnel for the past two seasons, was hired as the new general manager of the Indianapolis Colts. On January 30, Todd Bowles, who served as the Miami Dolphins' interim head coach for the final three games of the 2011 season, was hired as the Eagles' new defensive backs coach.

Despite speculation to the contrary, defensive coordinator Juan Castillo retained his job. Castillo was blamed by some fans for a series of fourth-quarter collapses early in the season, but the defense appeared to improve toward the end of the season.

Offensive coordinator Marty Mornhinweg was reportedly a candidate for several head coaching vacancies in this league, but those opportunities passed without him.

On October 16, 2012, Castillo was fired and replaced by Todd Bowles.

On December 3, 2012, defensive line coach Jim Washburn was fired. He was then replaced by Tommy Brasher.

== Roster changes ==
=== Free agents ===
Position	Player	Tag	2012 Team	Notes
DE	Victor Abiamiri	UFA	TBD	
RB	Ronnie Brown	UFA	San Diego Chargers	
DT	Antonio Dixon	RFA	Indianapolis Colts	re-signed on March 14, but waived on August 31. re-signed to a two-year deal on December 26.
T	King Dunlap	UFA	Philadelphia Eagles	
WR	DeSean Jackson	UFA	Philadelphia Eagles	assigned franchise tag on March 5, signed contract extension on March 14
DT	Derek Landri	UFA	Philadelphia Eagles	
DT	Trevor Laws	UFA	St. Louis Rams	
G	Evan Mathis	UFA	Philadelphia Eagles	signed to a 5-year deal on March 17
DE	Juqua Parker	UFA	Cleveland Browns	
FB	Owen Schmitt	UFA	Oakland Raiders	
WR	Steve Smith	UFA	St. Louis Rams	
QB	Vince Young	UFA	Buffalo Bills	

Player re-signed by the Eagles

=== Trades ===
- On March 14, the Eagles traded Offensive tackle Winston Justice and a 2012 sixth-round draft selection to the Indianapolis Colts in exchange for the Colts' sixth-round selection.
- On March 20, the Eagles traded its 2012 third- and fourth-round draft selections to the Houston Texans in exchange for linebacker DeMeco Ryans and the Texans' third-round selection.
- On April 25, the Eagles traded cornerback Asante Samuel to the Atlanta Falcons for Atlanta's 2012 seventh round draft choice (229 overall, used to select Bryce Brown).
- On July 22, the Eagles traded cornerback D.J. Johnson to the Indianapolis Colts for former Penn State star defensive tackle Ollie Ogbu.
- On August 2, the Eagles once again traded with the Indianapolis Colts. This time, they traded linebacker Moise Fokou and linebacker Greg Lloyd, Jr. to the Colts for cornerback Kevin Thomas and a conditional seventh round pick in the 2013 NFL draft.

=== 2012 draft class ===
Round	Selection	Player	Position	College	Signed	Notes
1	12	Fletcher Cox	DT	Mississippi State		(Note: The team traded its first- (#15 overall), fourth- (#114 overall) and sixth- (#172 overall) round selections to the Seattle Seahawks in exchange for the Seahawks' first-round selection (#12 overall). The #172 overall selection was previously acquired in a trade that sent tackle Winston Justice and the team's original sixth-round selection (#187 overall) to the Indianapolis Colts.)
2	46	Mychal Kendricks	LB	California		
2	59	Vinny Curry	DE	Marshall		(Note: The team acquired an additional second-round selection—#51 overall—and cornerback Dominique Rodgers-Cromartie in a trade that sent quarterback Kevin Kolb to the Arizona Cardinals The Eagles later traded the #51 overall selection to the Green Bay Packers in exchange for the Packers' second- and fourth-round selections (#59 and #123 overall, respectively).) (Note: The team traded its original third-round selection (#76 overall) and a fourth-round selection (#99 overall; previously acquired as part of a trade that sent a 2011 fourth-round selection to the Tampa Bay Buccaneers) to the Houston Texans in exchange for linebacker DeMeco Ryans and the Texans' third-round selection (#88 overall).) (Note: See draft note 1.)
3	88	Nick Foles	QB	Arizona		
4	123	Brandon Boykin	CB	Georgia		
5	153	Dennis Kelly	OT	Purdue		
6	194	Marvin McNutt	WR	Iowa		(Note: See draft note 1.) (Note: The team acquired this sixth-round selection (#194 overall) as part of a 2010 trade that sent linebacker Joe Mays to the Denver Broncos; the Broncos originally sent running back J. J. Arrington to the Eagles, with the condition that the Eagles would receive a conditional 2012 selection from the Broncos if Arrington did not make the Eagles' 53-man roster at the beginning of the 2010 season (Arrington was indeed released by the Eagles shortly before the 2010 season).)
6	200	Brandon Washington	OG	Miami		(Note: The team acquired this sixth-round selection (#200 overall) in a trade that sent the team's original seventh-round selection (#223 overall) and linebacker Tracy White to the New England Patriots.) (Note: The team acquired a new seventh-round selection (#229 overall) in a trade that sent cornerback Asante Samuel to the Atlanta Falcons.)
7	229	Bryce Brown	RB	Kansas State		(Note: The team acquired this sixth-round selection (#200 overall) in a trade that sent the team's original seventh-round selection (#223 overall) and linebacker Tracy White to the New England Patriots.) (Note: The team acquired a new seventh-round selection (#229 overall) in a trade that sent cornerback Asante Samuel to the Atlanta Falcons.)

== Staff ==
2012 Philadelphia Eagles staff
Front office: Chairman/CEO – Jeffrey Lurie; President – Don Smolenski; general manager – Howie Roseman; Senior football advisor – Tom Donahoe; Director of pro personnel – Louis Riddick; Assistant director of pro scouting – Ed Marynowitz; Director of college scouting – Anthony Patch; Player personnel executive – Rick Mueller; Head coaches: Head coach – Andy Reid; Assistant head coach/offensive coordinator – Marty Mornhinweg; Assistant to the head coach – Corey Matthaei; Offensive coaches: Quarterbacks – Doug Pederson; Running backs – Ted Williams; Tight ends – Tom Melvin; Offensive line – Howard Mudd; Assistant offensive line – Eugene Chung; Senior offensive assistant/wide receivers – David Culley; Offensive quality control – Matt Nagy; Statistical analysis coordinator – Mike Frazier; Coaching intern – Greg Lewis	Defensive coaches: Defensive coordinator – Juan Castillo; Defensive coordinator/defensive backs/secondary – Todd Bowles; Defensive line – Jim Washburn; Defensive line – Tommy Brasher; Linebackers – Mike Caldwell; Secondary/safeties – Mike Zordich; Defensive quality control – Bobby April III; Special teams coaches: Special teams coordinator – Bobby April; Special teams quality control – Duce Staley; Strength and conditioning: Head athletic trainer – Rick Burkholder; Head strength and conditioning – Barry Rubin; Assistant strength and conditioning – Keith Gray; Assistant strength and conditioning – Travis Crittenden

== Final roster ==
2012 Philadelphia Eagles roster
Quarterbacks (QB): 11 Trent Edwards; 7 Michael Vick; Running backs (RB): 34 Bryce Brown; 39 Stanley Havili; 41 Emil Igwenagu; 28 Dion Lewis; 25 LeSean McCoy; 32 Chris Polk; Wide receivers (WR): 81 Jason Avant; 14 Riley Cooper; 13 Damaris Johnson; 18 Jeremy Maclin; 83 Marvin McNutt; 19 Greg Salas; Tight ends (TE): 87 Brent Celek; 86 Evan Moore	Offensive linemen (OL): 77 Demetress Bell T; 65 King Dunlap T; 67 Dennis Kelly T/G; 78 Matt Kopa T; 69 Evan Mathis G; 66 Dallas Reynolds C; 64 Jake Scott G; 68 Matt Tennant C; 63 Danny Watkins G; Defensive linemen (DL): 58 Trent Cole DE; 91 Fletcher Cox DT; 75 Vinny Curry DE; 90 Antonio Dixon DT; 54 Brandon Graham DE; 76 Phillip Hunt DE; 97 Cullen Jenkins DT; 94 Derek Landri DT; 55 Darryl Tapp DE; 72 Cedric Thornton DT	Linebackers (LB): 51 Jamar Chaney OLB; 56 Akeem Jordan OLB; 95 Mychal Kendricks OLB; 50 Casey Matthews MLB; 53 Ryan Rau OLB; 59 DeMeco Ryans MLB; Defensive backs (DB): 29 Nate Allen SS; 30 Colt Anderson FS; 24 Nnamdi Asomugha CB; 22 Brandon Boykin CB; 42 Kurt Coleman FS; 27 Brandon Hughes CB; 31 Curtis Marsh CB; 23 Dominique Rodgers-Cromartie CB; 21 David Sims SS; Special teams (ST): 46 Jon Dorenbos LS; 6 Alex Henery K; 1 Mat McBriar P	Practice squad: 93 Ronnie Cameron DT; 89 Derek Carrier TE; 88 B. J. Cunningham WR; 96 Marcus Dowtin LB; 73 Matt Reynolds T; 57 Nathan Stupar LB; 61 Julian Vandervelde C; 26 Eddie Whitley CB; Reserve: 9 Nick Foles QB (IR); 82 Clay Harbor TE (IR); 79 Todd Herremans T (IR); 10 DeSean Jackson WR (IR); 80 Ronald Johnson WR (IR); 62 Jason Kelce C (IR); 74 Nate Menkin T (IR); 98 Mike Patterson DT (IR); 71 Jason Peters T (NF-Inj.); Rookies in italics 53 active, 9 reserve, 8 practice squad

== Schedule ==
The Eagles began their season on a well-fitted 3–1 start by pulling off three close wins over the Browns, Ravens and Giants in September. However, from October and forward on, the Eagles hit a collapse as they lost 8 in a row and 11 of their final 12 games. During the 8-game losing streak, they allowed the Cowboys, Redskins, Steelers, Panthers and Saints to turn their seasons around with a win. The Eagles were eliminated from playoff contention with a loss to the Cowboys in Week 13. They also finished 2–6 at home, their worst home record since going winless at home in 1972, after they lost their last six home games to finish the season (though they would lose the first four home games in 2013 to extend the streak to 10 games). The Eagles fired Andy Reid on December 31, 2012, the day after a 42–7 loss to the Giants after 14 years with the team. The 4–12 record was the Eagles' worst since the collapse of the Ray Rhodes era, and the 12 losses were the most of any season in Andy Reid's career.

=== Preseason ===
Week	Date	Opponent	Result	Record	Venue	Recap
1	August 9	Pittsburgh Steelers	**W** 24–23	1–0	Lincoln Financial Field	Recap
2	August 20	at New England Patriots	**W** 27–17	2–0	Gillette Stadium	Recap
3	August 24	at Cleveland Browns	**W** 27–10	3–0	Cleveland Browns Stadium	Recap
4	August 30	New York Jets	**W** 28–10	4–0	Lincoln Financial Field	Recap

=== Regular season ===
Week	Date	Opponent	Result	Record	Venue	Recap
1	September 9	at Cleveland Browns	**W** 17–16	1–0	Cleveland Browns Stadium	Recap
2	September 16	Baltimore Ravens	**W** 24–23	2–0	Lincoln Financial Field	Recap
3	September 23	at Arizona Cardinals	**L** 6–27	2–1	University of Phoenix Stadium	Recap
4	September 30	**New York Giants**	**W** 19–17	3–1	Lincoln Financial Field	Recap
5	October 7	at Pittsburgh Steelers	**L** 14–16	3–2	Heinz Field	Recap
6	October 14	Detroit Lions	**L** 23–26 (OT)	3–3	Lincoln Financial Field	Recap
7	Bye					
8	October 28	Atlanta Falcons	**L** 17–30	3–4	Lincoln Financial Field	Recap
9	November 5	at New Orleans Saints	**L** 13–28	3–5	Mercedes-Benz Superdome	Recap
10	November 11	**Dallas Cowboys**	**L** 23–38	3–6	Lincoln Financial Field	Recap
11	November 18	at **Washington Redskins**	**L** 6–31	3–7	FedExField	Recap
12	November 26	Carolina Panthers	**L** 22–30	3–8	Lincoln Financial Field	Recap
13	December 2	at **Dallas Cowboys**	**L** 33–38	3–9	Cowboys Stadium	Recap
14	December 9	at Tampa Bay Buccaneers	**W** 23–21	4–9	Raymond James Stadium	Recap
15	December 13	Cincinnati Bengals	**L** 13–34	4–10	Lincoln Financial Field	Recap
16	December 23	**Washington Redskins**	**L** 20–27	4–11	Lincoln Financial Field	Recap
17	December 30	at **New York Giants**	**L** 7–42	4–12	MetLife Stadium	Recap

Note: Intra-division opponents are in bold text.

=== Game summaries ===
==== Week 1: at Cleveland Browns ====
Week One: Philadelphia Eagles at Cleveland Browns – Game summary

Quarter	1	2	3	4	Total
**Eagles**	0	10	0	7	**17**
Browns	3	0	3	10	**16**

at Cleveland Browns Stadium, Cleveland, Ohio

- Date: September 9
- Game time: 1:00 p.m. EDT
- Game weather: 68 °F (20 °C), sunny
- Game attendance: 68,693
- Referee: Ken Roan
- TV announcers (Fox): Dick Stockton, John Lynch and Jennifer Hale

Game information

**First quarter**

- CLE – Phil Dawson 43-yard field goal, 9:12 (CLE 3–0)

**Second quarter**

- PHI – Alex Henery 42-yard field goal, 14:58 (TIE 3–3)
- PHI – Jeremy Maclin, 18-yard pass from Michael Vick, Alex Henery XP good, 0:17 (PHI 10–3)

**Third quarter**

- CLE – Phil Dawson 42-yard field goal, 4:57 (PHI 10–6)

**Fourth quarter**

- CLE – Phil Dawson 22-yard field goal, 14:57 (PHI 10–9)
- CLE – D'Qwell Jackson intercepted Michael Vick for 27 yards, Phil Dawson XP good, 13:59 (CLE 16–10)
- PHI – Clay Harbor, 4-yard pass from Michael Vick, Alex Henery XP good, 1:18 (PHI 17–16)

**Top passers**

- PHI – Michael Vick (29–56, 317 yards, 2 TD, 4 INT)
- CLE – Brandon Weeden (12–35, 118 yards, 0 TD, 4 INT)

**Top rushers**

- PHI – LeSean McCoy (20 rushes, 110 yards, 0 TD)
- CLE – Trent Richardson (19 rushes, 39 yards, 0 TD)

**Top receivers**

- PHI – Jeremy Maclin (7 rec, 96 yards, TD)
- CLE – Mohammed Massaquoi (3 rec, 41 yards, 0 TD)

**Top tacklers**

- PHI – Tie: Kurt Coleman, Akeem Jordan, DeMeco Ryans, Mychal Kendricks, Nate Allen (5)
- CLE – Buster Skrine (8)

The Philadelphia Eagles opened up the season by traveling to Cleveland to square off against the Browns. A 43-yard field goal by veteran Browns kicker Phil Dawson gave Cleveland a 3–0 lead some six minutes into the first quarter. The Eagles would respond with a field goal of their own, though, as Alex Henery sent the ball through the uprights from 42 yards out just seconds into the second period. With the score tied at 3–3 and just seventeen seconds before the half, an 18-yard pass from Eagles' quarterback Michael Vick to wideout Jeremy Maclin extended the Eagles lead by seven. At the half, the score was 10–3, the Eagles leading the Browns by a seven-point margin. Browns kicker Phil Dawson successfully converted another field goal from 42 yards away with just under five minutes left in the third quarter, trimming the score to 10–6. Shortly afterwards, Dawson made the score 10–9 with a 22-yard field goal, his third of the day, and narrowing the Eagles' lead to one point with about fourteen minutes left in the game. The underdog Browns continued the scoring streak, taking the lead on an errant Michael Vick throw and 27-yard interception return touchdown by D'Qwell Jackson approximately thirty seconds later. With the score at 16–10 and an upset in the works, Michael Vick calmly drove the Eagles down the field and threw a strike to Clay Harbor from 4 yards out to return the lead to Philadelphia, 17–16. The Browns were unable to reciprocate and the Philadelphia Eagles narrowly claimed the week one victory. With the nail-biting win, the Eagles began their season 1–0.

==== Week 2: vs. Baltimore Ravens ====
Week Two: Baltimore Ravens at Philadelphia Eagles – Game summary

Quarter	1	2	3	4	Total
Ravens	7	10	0	6	**23**
**Eagles**	7	0	10	7	**24**

at Lincoln Financial Field, Philadelphia, Pennsylvania

- Date: September 16
- Game time: 1:00 pm. EDT
- Game weather: 72 °F (22 °C), (Partly Cloudy)
- Game attendance: 69,144
- Referee: Robert Frazer
- TV announcers (CBS): Greg Gumbel and Dan Dierdorf

Game information

**First quarter**

- PHI- LeSean McCoy 1-yard run, Alex Henery XP good, 5:40, (PHI 7–0)
- BAL- Vonta Leach 5-yard run, Justin Tucker XP good, 2:08 (TIE 7–7)

**Second quarter**

- BAL- Jacoby Jones, 21-yard pass from Joe Flacco, Justin Tucker XP good, 8:32 (BAL 14–7)
- BAL- Justin Tucker 56-yard field goal, 0:01 (BAL 17–7)

**Third quarter**

- PHI- Jeremy Maclin, 23-yard pass from Michael Vick, Alex Henery XP good, 10:40 (BAL 17–14)
- PHI- Alex Henery 23-yard field goal, 5:30 (TIE 17–17)

**Fourth quarter**

- BAL- Justin Tucker 51-yard field goal, 11:28 (BAL 20–17)
- BAL- Justin Tucker 48-yard field goal, 4:43 (BAL 23–17)
- PHI- Michael Vick 1-yard run, Alex Henery XP good, 1:55 (PHI 24–23)

**Top passers**

- BAL – Joe Flacco (22–42, 232 yards, TD, INT)
- PHI – Michael Vick (23–32, 371 yards, TD, 2 INT)

**Top rushers**

- BAL – Ray Rice (16 rushes, 99 yards)
- PHI – LeSean McCoy (25 rushes, 81 yards, TD)

**Top receivers**

- BAL – Dennis Pitta (8 rec, 65 yards)
- PHI – Brent Celek (8 rec, 157 yards)

**Top tacklers**

- BAL – Lardarius Webb (7)
- PHI – Nate Allen (10)

The Eagles returned home to square off against the favored Baltimore Ravens in a Battle of the Birds. Eagles' running back LeSean McCoy opened the scoring with a 1-yard touchdown run some ten minutes into the first quarter for a 7–0 lead. However, the Ravens were able to tie the game up at 7–7 with Vonta Leach running for a 5-yard touchdown. They would take the lead in the 2nd quarter as Joe Flacco found Jacoby Jones on a 21-yard touchdown pass to take a 14–7 lead followed by a 56-yard field goal by Justin Tucker for a 17–7 lead just before halftime. The 3rd quarter was all Eagles as they managed to catch up with Michael Vick's 23-yard touchdown pass to Jeremy Maclin to make the score 17–14 and then tied the game with Alex Henery's 23-yard field goal at 17–17. However, the Ravens moved back into the lead in the 4th quarter as Tucker was able to score 2 long field goals from 51 and 48 yards out to make the score 20–17 and 23–17 respectively. The Eagles came out and surprisingly won the game with Vick's 1-yard QB rushing touchdown as the Eagles managed to win the game 24–23.

With the win, the Eagles improved to 2–0 and became the first team in NFL history to start a season 2–0 after winning their first 2 games by only a point.

==== Week 3: at Arizona Cardinals ====
Week Three: Philadelphia Eagles at Arizona Cardinals – Game summary

Quarter	1	2	3	4	Total
Eagles	0	0	6	0	**6**
**Cardinals**	10	14	0	3	**27**

at University of Phoenix Stadium, Glendale, Arizona

- Date: September 23
- Game time: 4:05 pm. EDT/1:05 pm. Arizona time
- Game weather: Played indoors (retractable roof closed)
- Game attendance: 60,436
- Referee: Mike Shepherd
- TV announcers (Fox): Thom Brennaman, Brian Billick and Laura Okmin

Game information

**First quarter**

- Jay Feely, 47-yard field goal, 10:18 (ARI 3–0)
- Michael Floyd, 8-yard pass from Kevin Kolb, Jay Feely XP good, 1:04 (ARI 10–0)

**Second quarter**

- Larry Fitzgerald, 37-yard pass from Kevin Kolb, Jay Feely XP good, 7:30 (ARI 17–0)
- James Sanders, 98-yard fumble return, Jay Feely XP good, 0:00 (ARI 24–0)

**Third quarter**

- Alex Henery, 36-yard field goal, 5:07 (ARI 24–3)
- Alex Henery, 40-yard field goal, 0:02 (ARI 24–6)

**Fourth quarter**

- Jay Feely, 27-yard field goal, 3:52 (ARI 27–6)

**Top passers**

- PHI –Michael Vick (17–37, 217 yards)
- ARI –Kevin Kolb (17–24, 222 yards, 2 TD)

**Top rushers**

- PHI –LeSean McCoy (13 rushes, 70 yards)
- ARI –Ryan Williams (13 rushes, 83 yards)

**Top receivers**

- PHI –Damaris Johnson (5 catches, 84 yards)
- ARI –Larry Fitzgerald (9 catches, 113 yards, TD)

**Top tacklers**

- PHI –Kurt Coleman (9)
- ARI –TIE: Daryl Washington, O'Brien Schofield, William Gay (6)

After a 2–0 start, the Eagles traveled to take on the Cardinals. The Cards struck first in the first quarter with Jay Feely's 47-yard field goal for a 3–0 lead followed by Kevin Kolb finding Michael Floyd on an 8-yard touchdown pass for a 10–0 lead. The Cards would increase their lead in the 2nd quarter with Kolb finding Larry Fitzgerald on a 37-yard pass and then James Sanders recovering a fumble and returning it 98 yards for a touchdown for leads of 17–0 and then a 24–0 halftime lead. The Eagles managed to get on the board in the 3rd quarter with Alex Henery's 2 field goals from 36 and 40 yards out to decrease the lead to 24–3 and then 24–6. In the 4th quarter the Cardinals ended up getting their only points of the 2nd half with Feely's 27-yard field goal to end the game with a final score of 27–6.

With the loss, the Eagles fell to 2–1.

==== Week 4: vs. New York Giants ====
Week Four: New York Giants at Philadelphia Eagles – Game summary

Quarter	1	2	3	4	Total
Giants	0	3	7	7	**17**
**Eagles**	0	7	6	6	**19**

at Lincoln Financial Field, Philadelphia, Pennsylvania

- Date: September 30
- Game time: 8:20 pm. EDT
- Game weather: 57 °F (14 °C), (Clear)
- Game attendance: 69,144
- Referee: Ron Winter
- TV announcers (NBC): Al Michaels, Cris Collinsworth and Michele Tafoya

Game information

**First quarter**

- No Scoring

**Second quarter**

- PHI- DeSean Jackson 19-yard pass from Michael Vick (Alex Henery kick) 1:47 (PHI 7–0)
- NYG- Lawrence Tynes 25-yard field goal 0:05 (PHI 7–3)

**Third quarter**

- PHI- Alex Henery 20-yard field goal 9:55 (PHI 10–3)
- NYG- Victor Cruz 14-yard pass from Eli Manning (Lawrence Tynes kick) 5:28 (TIE 10–10)
- PHI- Alex Henery 48-yard field goal 2:07 (PHI 13–10)

**Fourth quarter**

- PHI- Alex Henery 35-yard field goal 9:25 (PHI 16–10)
- NYG- Bear Pascoe 6-yard pass from Eli Manning (Lawrence Tynes kick) 6:45 (NYG 17–16)
- PHI- Alex Henery 26-yard field goal 1:49 (PHI 19–17)

**Top passers**

- NYG – Eli Manning (24–42,309 yards,2 TD,1 INT)
- PHI – Michael Vick (19–30,241 yards,1 TD,0 INT)

**Top rushers**

- NYG – Ahmad Bradshaw (13 rushes,39 yards,0 TD)
- PHI – LeSean McCoy (23 rushes,123 yards,0 TD)

**Top receivers**

- NYG – Victor Cruz (9 rec,109 yards,1 TD)
- PHI – DeSean Jackson (6 rec,99 yards,1 TD)

**Top tacklers**

- NYG – Chase Blackburn (8 tackles,1 sack)
- PHI – Tie: Brandon Boykin, Kurt Coleman, Dominique Rodgers-Cromartie (4 tackles)

After a tough road loss to the Cardinals, the Eagles went back home for division rival game 1 against the Giants. After a scoreless first quarter the Eagles drew first blood with Michael Vick finding Desean Jackson on a 19-yard touchdown pass for a 7–0 lead before the Giants scored off of a Lawrence Tynes 25-yard field goal to cut the lead to 7–3 at halftime. After this the Eagles went right back to work in the 3rd quarter with Alex Henery nailing a 20-yard field goal to help his team take a 7-point lead again at 10–3. However, the Giants managed to tie the game up as Eli Manning found Victor Cruz on a 14-yard touchdown pass to make the score 10–10. The Eagles moved back into the lead with Henery's 48-yard field goal for a 13–10 lead. They would score another field goal in the 4th quarter for a 16–10 lead. However, the Giants were able to take the lead Manning finding Bear Pascoe on a 6-yard touchdown pass for a 17–16 score. But the Eagles moved down the field and were able to score with Henery's 26-yard field goal for a final score of 19–17.

With the win, the Eagles improved to 3–1. The team also made it to 1–0 in games where Vick does not turn the ball over. The Eagles had gone 8–1 in their last 9 games against the Giants by this time. The win against the Giants stood as their last home win until Week 11 of the 2013 season.

==== Week 5: at Pittsburgh Steelers ====
Week Five: Philadelphia Eagles at Pittsburgh Steelers – Game summary

Quarter	1	2	3	4	Total
Eagles	0	0	7	7	**14**
**Steelers**	0	10	0	6	**16**

at Heinz Field, Pittsburgh, Pennsylvania

- Date: October 7
- Game time: 1:00 pm. EDT
- Game weather: 48 °F (9 °C), cloudy
- Game attendance: 64,737
- Referee: Tony Corrente
- TV announcers (Fox): Joe Buck, Troy Aikman and Pam Oliver

Game information

**First quarter**

- No scoring plays

**Second quarter**

- PIT- Rashard Mendenhall, 13-yard run, Shaun Suisham XP good, 5:01 (PIT 7–0)
- PIT- Shaun Suisham, 20-yard field goal, 0:09 (PIT 10–0)

**Third quarter**

- PHI- LeSean McCoy, 15-yard pass from Michael Vick, Alex Henery XP good, 6:40 (PIT 10–7)

**Fourth quarter**

- PIT- Shaun Suisham. 34-yard field goal, 14:55 (PIT 13–7)
- PHI- Brent Celek, 2-yard pass from Michael Vick, Alex Henery XP good, 6:38 (PHI 14–13)
- PIT- Shaun Suisham, 34-yard field goal, 0:00 (PIT 16–14)

**Top passers**

- PHI – Michael Vick – 20–30, 175 yards, 2 TD
- PIT – Ben Roethlisberger – 21–37, 207 yards

**Top rushers**

- PHI – LeSean McCoy – 16 rushes, 53 yards (note: 4 receptions, 27 yards, TD as well)
- PIT – Rashard Mendenhall – 14 rushes, 81 yards, TD

**Top receivers**

- PHI – DeSean Jackson – 4 receptions, 58 yards
- PIT – Antonio Brown – 7 receptions, 86 yards

**Top tacklers**

- PHI – DeMeco Ryans – 12 tackles
- PIT – Lawrence Timmons – 9 tackles

The Eagles traveled to western Pennsylvania to take on longtime in-state rival Steelers at Heinz Field. After a scoreless first quarter, the Steelers were able to get on the board first with Rashard Mendenhall's 13-yard touchdown run for a 7–0 lead followed by Shaun Suisham's 20-yard field goal for a 10–0 lead at halftime. The Eagles went to work in the 3rd quarter as Michael Vick found LeSean McCoy on a 15-yard touchdown pass to shorten the lead to 10–7. The Steelers increased their lead with Suisham kicking a 37-yard field goal to make the score 13–7. The Eagles took the lead with Vick hooking up with Brent Celek on a 2-yard touchdown pass for a 14–13 score. However, the Steelers were able to drive down the field and Suisham wrapped up the game with a game-winning 34-yard field goal for a final score of 16–14.

With the loss, the Eagles dropped to 3–2.

==== Week 6: vs. Detroit Lions ====
Week Six: Detroit Lions at Philadelphia Eagles – Game summary

Quarter	1	2	3	4	OT	Total
**Lions**	6	0	0	17	3	**26**
Eagles	0	7	6	10	0	**23**

at Lincoln Financial Field, Philadelphia, Pennsylvania

- Date: October 14
- Game time: 1:00 pm. EDT
- Game weather: 71 °F (22 °C), (Sunny)
- Game attendance: 69,144
- Referee: Bill Vinovich
- TV announcers (Fox): Kenny Albert, Daryl Johnston and Tony Siragusa

Game information

**First quarter**

- DET – Jason Hanson 46-yard field goal, 11:03 Lions 3–0, **Drive: 4 plays, 6 yards, 0:55.**
- DET – Jason Hanson 34-yard field goal, 3:58 Lions 6–0, **Drive: 10 plays, 65 yards, 5:45.**

**Second quarter**

- PHI – LeSean McCoy 2-yard pass from Michael Vick (Alex Henery kick), 1:16 Eagles 7–6, **Drive: 7 plays, 79 yards, 3:28.**

**Third quarter**

- PHI – Alex Henery 26-yard field goal, 8:23 Eagles 10–6, **Drive: 15 plays, 72 yards, 6:37.**
- PHI – Alex Henery 32-yard field goal, 3:39 Eagles 13–6, **Drive: 10 plays, 50 yard, 3:40.**

**Fourth quarter**

- PHI – Alex Henery 49-yard field goal, 13:39 Eagles 16–6, **Drive: 9 plays, 35 yards, 3:11.**
- DET – Matthew Stafford 1-yard run (Jason Hanson kick), 10:30 Eagles 16–13, **Drive: 7 plays, 80 yard, 3:09.**
- PHI – Jeremy Maclin 70-yard pass from Michael Vick (Alex Henery kick), 5:18 Eagles 23–13, **Drive: 3 plays, 76 yards, 1:29.**
- DET – Nate Burleson 17-yard pass from Matthew Stafford (Jason Hanson kick), 3:32 Eagles 23–20, **Drive: 7 plays, 80 yards, 1:46.**
- DET – Jason Hanson 19-yard field goal, 0:03 Tied 23–23, **Drive: 12 plays, 67 yards, 2:24.**

**Overtime**

- DET – Jason Hanson 45-yard field goal, 11:00 Lions 26–23, **Drive: 5 plays, 23 yards, 2:22.**

**Top passers**

- DET – Matthew Stafford – 22/45, 311 yards, 1 touchdown, 1 interception
- PHI – Michael Vick – 28/46, 311 yards, 2 touchdowns, 2 interceptions

**Top rushers**

- DET – Mikel Leshoure – 15 carries, 70 yards
- PHI – Michael Vick – 9 carries, 59 yards

**Top receivers**

- DET – Calvin Johnson – 6 receptions, 135 yards
- PHI – Jeremy Maclin – 6 receptions, 130 yards, 1 touchdown

**Top tacklers**

- DET – Justin Durant – 8 tackles
- PHI – DeMeco Ryans – 10 tackles, 3 assists

The Eagles returned home to play against a struggling Lions team. In the first quarter it was all Lions with Jason Hanson kicking field goals from 46 and 34 yards out for leads of 3–0 and then 6–0. The Eagles took the lead in the 2nd quarter with Michael Vick's 2-yard touchdown pass to LeSean McCoy for a 7–6 score at halftime. In the 3rd quarter the Eagles were able to move further ahead with 2 Alex Henery field goals: 26 and 32 yards out for leads of 10–6 and then 13–6. Henery would kick 49-yard field goal for a 16–6 lead before Matthew Stafford ran for a QB 1-yard touchdown to shorten the Eagles' lead to 3 at 16–13. But the Eagles again pushed ahead by 10 as Vick found Maclin on a 70-yard touchdown pass for a 23–13 lead. But then the lead was shortened to 3 again as Stafford found Nate Burleson on a 17-yard touchdown pass for a 23–20 score and then tied the game with Hanson's 19-yard field goal at 23–23 to send the game into overtime. In overtime, the Eagles won the toss but went 3 and out as the Lions were able to drive down the field and wrap things up with Hanson's game-winning 45-yard field goal to end the game 26–23.

With the loss, the Eagles head into their bye week at 3–3. The team also dropped to 2–3 in games where Vick turns the ball over.

==== Week 8: vs. Atlanta Falcons ====
Week Eight: Atlanta Falcons at Philadelphia Eagles – Game summary

Quarter	1	2	3	4	Total
**Falcons**	14	10	3	3	**30**
Eagles	0	7	3	7	**17**

at Lincoln Financial Field, Philadelphia, Pennsylvania

- Date: October 28
- Game time: 1:00 pm. EDT
- Game weather: 55 °F (13 °C), (Cloudy)
- Game attendance: 69,144
- Referee: Gene Steratore
- TV announcers (Fox): Dick Stockton, John Lynch and Jennifer Hale

Game information

**First quarter**

- ATL- Drew Davis, 15-yard pass from Matt Ryan, Matt Bryant XP good, 6:21 (ATL 7–0)
- ATL- Jason Snelling, 3-yard pass from Matt Ryan, Matt Bryant XP good, 0:36 (ATL 14–0)

**Second quarter**

- PHI- LeSean McCoy, 2-yard run, Alex Henery XP good, 8:23 (ATL 14–7)
- ATL- Julio Jones, 63-yard pass from Matt Ryan, Matt Bryant XP good, 6:41 (ATL 21–7)
- ATL- Matt Bryant. 43-yard field goal, 0:06 (ATL 24–7)

**Third quarter**

- PHI- Alex Henery, 33-yard field goal, 11:23 (ATL 24–10)
- ATL- Matt Bryant, 29-yard field goal, 6:10 (ATL 27–10)

**Fourth quarter**

- ATL- Matt Bryant, 30-yard field goal, 14:57 (ATL 30–10)
- PHI- LeSean McCoy, 7-yard pass from Michael Vick, Alex Henery XP good, 7:18 (ATL 30–17)

**Top passers**

- ATL – Matt Ryan (22–29,262 yards,3 TD,0 INT)
- PHI – Michael Vick (21–35, 191 yards,1 TD,0 INT)

**Top rushers**

- ATL – Michael Turner (24 rushes,58 yards,0 TD)
- PHI – LeSean McCoy (16 rushes,45 yards,1 TD)

**Top receivers**

- ATL – Julio Jones (5 rec,123 yards,1 TD)
- PHI – Jeremy Maclin (6 rec,33 yards,0 TD)

**Top tacklers**

- ATL – Thomas DeCoud (6 tackles,1 sack), Robert McClain (6 tackles)
- PHI – Nate Allen (8 tackles)

The Eagles stayed home for a duel with their historic rival undefeated 6–0 Falcons. Played under cloudy skies, the game was also notable in that the weather conditions heralded the approach of Hurricane Sandy, a storm set to make an unprecedented landfall in nearby New Jersey. In the first quarter, the Falcons drew first blood as Matt Ryan found Drew Davis for a 15-yard pass to make the score 7–0. The team increased their lead with Ryan finding Jason Snelling to make it 14–0. In the 2nd quarter, the Eagles would get on the board with LeSean McCoy's 2-Yard run to make it 14–7. However, the Falcons responded with Ryan's 63-yard TD pass to Julio Jones to make it 21–7. The Falcon would increase their lead before halftime with Matt Bryant's 43-yard field goal to make it 24–7. The Eagles would try to rally in the 3rd quarter with a 33-yard field goal from Alex Henry to shorten the lead to 24–10, but the Falcons pulled away as Bryant would kick a 29-yard field goal to make it 27–10. In the 4th quarter, Bryant increased the Falcons' lead with a 30-yard field goal to make the score 30–10. The Eagles tried to rally as Michael Vick found McCoy to make the score 30–17. However, the Eagles were unable to try to attempt a comeback win as the team dropped to 3–4 on the season.

==== Week 9: at New Orleans Saints ====
Week Nine: Philadelphia Eagles at New Orleans Saints – Game summary

Quarter	1	2	3	4	Total
Eagles	0	3	10	0	**13**
**Saints**	7	14	7	0	**28**

at Mercedes-Benz Superdome, New Orleans, Louisiana

- Date: November 5
- Game time: 8:30 pm. EST/7:30 p.m. CST
- Game weather: Played indoors (dome stadium)
- Game attendance: 73,099
- Referee: Clete Blakeman
- TV announcers (ESPN): Mike Tirico, Jon Gruden and Lisa Salters

Game information

**First quarter**

- NO- Patrick Robinson, 99-yard interception return, Garrett Hartley XP good, 2:51 (NO 7-0)

**Second quarter**

- PHI- Alex Henery, 22-yard field goal, 12:07 (NO 7-3)
- NO- Chris Ivory, 22-yard run, Garrett Hartley XP good, 8:40 (NO 14-3)
- NO- Marques Colston, 1-yard pass from Drew Brees, Garrett Hartley XP good, 1:18 (NO 21-3)

**Third quarter**

- PHI- DeSean Jackson, 77-yard pass from Michael Vick, Alex Henery XP good, 8:56 (NO 21-10)
- PHI- Alex Henery, 37-yard field goal, 7:04 (NO 21-13)
- NO- Jimmy Graham, 6-yard pass from Drew Brees, Garrett Hartley XP good, 1:26 (NO 28-13)

**Fourth quarter**

- No scoring plays

**Top passers**

- PHI – Michael Vick (22–41,272 yards,1 TD,1 INT)
- NO – Drew Brees (21–27,239 yards,2 TD,0 INT)

**Top rushers**

- PHI – LeSean McCoy (19 rushes,119 yards,0 TD)
- NO – Chris Ivory (10 rushes,48 yards,1 TD)

**Top receivers**

- PHI – Jason Avant (6 rec,56 yards,0 TD)
- NO – Jimmy Graham (8 rec,72 yards,1 TD)

**Top tacklers**

- PHI – David Sims (6 tackles)
- NO – Malcolm Jenkins (7 tackles)

After a lopsided loss at home to the Falcons, the Eagles traveled down south to New Orleans to take on the Saints in the Mercedes-Benz Superdome. The Saints scored first with Patrick Robinson returning a Michael Vick interception 99 yards for a touchdown and a 7–0 lead for the only score of the game. The Eagles got on the board in the 2nd quarter as Alex Henery kicked a 22-yard field goal to cut the lead to 7–3 not long before Chris Ivory ran for a 22-yard touchdown to move the Saints ahead by 11 with a 14–3 lead and then they would score again with Drew Brees finding Marques Coltson on a 1-yard touchdown pass for a 21–3 halftime lead. The Eagles scored 10 unanswered points in the 3rd quarter with Vick hooking up with DeSean Jackson on a 77-yard touchdown pass for a score of 21–10 and then Henery kicked a 37-yard field goal for a score of 21–13. But the Saints scored one last time as Brees found Jimmy Graham on a 6-yard touchdown pass for a 28–13 lead which would be the final score of the game as neither team scored in the 4th quarter.

The Eagles lose to the Saints for the first time since the 2009 Season, when the Saints were Super Bowl bound.

With the loss, the Eagles fell to 3–5.

==== Week 10: vs. Dallas Cowboys ====
Week Ten: Dallas Cowboys at Philadelphia Eagles – Game summary

Quarter	1	2	3	4	Total
**Cowboys**	7	3	7	21	**38**
Eagles	7	0	10	6	**23**

at Lincoln Financial Field, Philadelphia, Pennsylvania

- Date: November 11
- Game time: 4:25 pm. EST
- Game weather: 62 °F (17 °C), (Sunny)
- Game attendance: 69,144
- Referee: Walt Coleman
- TV announcers (Fox): Joe Buck, Troy Aikman and Pam Oliver

Game information

**First quarter**

- PHI- Riley Cooper 2-yard pass from Michael Vick (Alex Henery kick) 9:53 (PHI 7–0)
- DAL- Felix Jones 11-yard pass from Tony Romo (Dan Bailey kick) 2:21 (TIE 7–7)

**Second quarter**

- DAL- Dan Bailey 30-yard field goal 3:50 (DAL 10–7)

**Third quarter**

- PHI- Jeremy Maclin 44-yard pass from Nick Foles (Alex Henery kick) 12:52 (PHI 14–10)
- PHI- Alex Henery 40-yard field goal 4:32 (PHI 17–10)
- DAL- Dez Bryant 30-yard pass from Tony Romo (Dan Bailey kick) 0:00 (TIE 17–17)

**Fourth quarter**

- DAL- Dwayne Harris 78-yard punt return (Dan Bailey kick) 13:35 (DAL 24–17)
- DAL- Brandon Carr 47-yard interception return (Dan Bailey kick) 12:25 (DAL 31–17)
- PHI- Stanley Havili 1-yard run (missed PAT) 1:55 (DAL 31–23)
- DAL- Jason Hatcher fumble recovery in end zone (Dan Bailey kick) 0:46 (DAL 38–23)

**Top passers**

- DAL – Tony Romo (19–26,209 yards,2 TD,0 INT)
- PHI – Nick Foles (22–32,219 yards,1 TD,1 INT)

**Top rushers**

- DAL – Felix Jones (16 rushes,71 yards,0 TD)
- PHI – LeSean McCoy (16 rushes,82 yards,0 TD)

**Top receivers**

- DAL – Jason Witten (8 rec,47 yards, 0 TD)
- PHI – Jeremy Maclin(8 rec,93 yards,1 TD)

**Top tacklers**

- DAL – Bruce Carter (10 tackles)
- PHI – DeMeco Ryans (7 tackles), Mychal Kendricks (7 tackles,1 sack)

The Eagles returned home for a game against the Cowboys. They scored first with Michael Vick hooking up with Riley Cooper on a 2-yard touchdown pass for a 7–0 lead, however, the Boys responded with Tony Romo finding Felix Jones on an 11-yard pass for a 7–7 lead. Then increased their lead in the 2nd quarter as Dan Bailey kicked a 30-yard field goal for a 10–7 halftime lead. Michael Vick had been knocked out of the game and was possibly out for the season after going 6/9 for 70 yards and a touchdown pass. Rookie QB Nick Foles would get his first NFL action and threw his first touchdown pass to Jeremy Maclin from 44 yards out as the Eagles retook a 14–10 lead while Henery moved the team ahead 17–10 with a 40-yard field goal. After this, the Cowboys went back to work as Romo found Dez Bryant on a 30-yard touchdown pass to tie the game at 17–17. Then the Boys retook the lead with Dwayne Harris returned a punt 78 yards for a touchdown for a 24–17 lead followed up by Brandon Carr returning an interception 47 yards for a touchdown and a 31–17 lead. The Eagles then got back to work with Stanley Havili 1-yard touchdown run (with a failed PAT) to shorten the lead to 31–23. But the Boys wrapped the game up with Jason Hatcher's fumble recovery in the end zone for a final score of 38–23.

With the loss, the Eagles dropped to 3–6.

==== Week 11: at Washington Redskins ====
Week Eleven: Philadelphia Eagles at Washington Redskins – Game summary

Quarter	1	2	3	4	Total
Eagles	0	3	3	0	**6**
**Redskins**	7	10	7	7	**31**

at FedExField, Landover, Maryland

- Date: November 18
- Game time: 1:00 pm. EST
- Game weather: 52 °F (11 °C), cloudy
- Game attendance: 79,327
- Referee: Terry McAulay
- TV announcers (Fox): Thom Brennaman, Brian Billick and Laura Okmin

Game information

**First quarter**

- WAS- Darrel Young, 6-yard pass from Robert Griffin III, (Kai Forbath kick), 13:13 (WAS 7–0)

**Second quarter**

- PHI- Alex Henery, 41-yard field goal, 14:19 (WAS 7–3)
- WAS- Aldrick Robinson, 49-yard pass from Robert Griffin III, (Kai Forbath kick), 10:45 (WAS 14–3)
- WAS- Kai Forbath,25-yard field goal 0:00 (WAS 17–3)

**Third quarter**

- PHI- Alex Henery,42-yard field goal 8:27 (WAS 17–6)
- WAS- Santana Moss,61-yard pass from Robert Griffin III, Kai Forbath kick) 4:50 (WAS 24–6)

**Fourth quarter**

- WAS- Logan Paulsen, 17-yard pass from Robert Griffin III (Kai Forbath kick) 10:24 (WAS 31–6

**Top passers**

- PHI – Nick Foles (21–46,204 yards,2 INT)
- WAS – Robert Griffin III (14–15,200 yards,4 TD)

**Top rushers**

- PHI – LeSean McCoy (15 rushes, 45 yards)
- WAS – Alfred Morris (20 rushes, 76 yards)

**Top receivers**

- PHI – LeSean McCoy (6 rec,67 yards)
- WAS – Josh Morgan (3 rec,25 yards)

**Top tacklers**

- PHI – Fletcher Cox (7 tackles,1 sack)
- WAS – London Fletcher (9 tackles)

The Eagles went to FedExField to face their division rival Redskins in what would be a killer loss for the starting game of Rookie QB Nick Foles. The young QB was picked off twice as the Skins zoomed passed the Eagles' defense to drop the team to 3–7, snapping their 3-game winning streak to their division rivals, and leaving them in last place in the NFC East.

==== Week 12: vs. Carolina Panthers ====
Week Twelve: Carolina Panthers at Philadelphia Eagles – Game summary

Quarter	1	2	3	4	Total
**Panthers**	14	0	7	9	**30**
Eagles	3	12	7	0	**22**

at Lincoln Financial Field, Philadelphia, Pennsylvania

- Date: November 26
- Game time: 8:30 pm. EST
- Game weather: 33 °F (1 °C), (Clear)
- Game attendance: 69,144
- Referee: Pete Morelli
- TV announcers (ESPN): Mike Tirico, Jon Gruden and Lisa Salters

Game information

**First quarter**

- PHI- Alex Henery, 36-yard field goal, 11:15 (PHI 3–0)
- CAR- Gary Barnidge, 24-yard pass from Cam Newton, Graham Gano XP good, 6:17 (CAR 7–3)
- CAR- Brandon LaFell, 43-yard pass from Cam Newton, Graham Gano XP good, 3:42 (CAR 14–3)

**Second quarter**

- PHI- Alex Henery, 41-yard field goal, 14:19 (CAR 14–6)
- PHI- Bryce Brown, 65-yard run, two-point conversion attempt failed, 11:07 (CAR 14–12)
- PHI- Alex Henery, 45-yard field goal, 3:20 (PHI 15–14)

**Third quarter**

- CAR- Cam Newton, 1-yard run, Graham Gano XP good, 9:13 (CAR 21–15)
- PHI- Bryce Brown, 5-yard run, Alex Henery XP good, 3:30 (PHI 22–21)

**Fourth quarter**

- CAR- Graham Gano, 23-yard field goal, 12:40 (CAR 24–22)
- CAR- Cam Newton, 2-yard run, PAT failed, 4:40 (CAR 30–22)

**Top passers**

- CAR – Cam Newton – 18/28, 306 yards, 2 TD
- PHI – Nick Foles – 16/21, 119 yards

**Top rushers**

- CAR – Cam Newton – 14 rushes, 52 yards, 2 TD
- PHI – Bryce Brown – 19 rushes, 178 yards, 2 TD

**Top receivers**

- CAR – Brandon LaFell – 3 receptions, 74 yards, TD
- PHI – Jeremy Maclin – 5 receptions, 55 yards

**Top tacklers**

- CAR – Sherrod Martin, Luke Kuechly – 8
- PHI – DeMeco Ryans – 10

With the loss, the Eagles fell to 3–8. Foles also went 0–2 as a starter.

==== Week 13: at Dallas Cowboys ====
Week Thirteen: Philadelphia Eagles at Dallas Cowboys – Game summary

Quarter	1	2	3	4	Total
Eagles	7	10	7	9	**33**
**Cowboys**	0	10	7	21	**38**

at Cowboys Stadium, Arlington, Texas

- Date: December 2
- Game time: 8:20 pm. EST/7:20 pm. CST
- Game weather: Played indoors (retractable roof closed)
- Game attendance: 81,851
- Referee: Jeff Triplette
- TV announcers (NBC): Al Michaels, Cris Collinsworth and Michele Tafoya

Game information

**First quarter**

- PHI- Bryce Brown, 10-yard run, Alex Henery XP good, 5:44 (PHI 7–0)

**Second quarter**

- DAL- Dan Bailey, 39-yard field goal, 13:39 (PHI 7–3)
- PHI- Bryce Brown, 5-yard run, Alex Henery XP good, 6:11 (PHI 14–3)
- DAL- DeMarco Murray, 1-yard run, Dan Bailey XP good, 0:41 (PHI 14–10)
- PHI- Alex Henery, 43-yard field goal, 0:00 (PHI 17–10)

**Third quarter**

- DAL- Dez Bryant, 23-yard pass from Tony Romo, Dan Bailey XP good, 11:18 (TIE 17–17)
- PHI- Riley Cooper, 15-yard pass from Nick Foles, Alex Henery XP good, 5:27 (PHI 24–17)

**Fourth quarter**

- DAL- Miles Austin, 27-yard pass from Tony Romo, Dan Bailey XP good, 13:41 (TIE 24–24)
- PHI- Alex Henery, 43-yard field goal, 9:51 (PHI 27–24)
- DAL- Dez Bryant, 6-yard pass from Tony Romo, Dan Bailey XP good, 5:35 (DAL 31–27)
- DAL- Morris Claiborne, 50-yard fumble return, Dan Bailey XP good, 3:50 (DAL 38–27)
- PHI- Damaris Johnson, 98-yard punt return, two-point conversion attempt failed, 0:31 (DAL 38–33)

**Top passers**

- PHI – Nick Foles – 22/34, 251 yards, TD
- DAL – Tony Romo – 22/27, 303 yards, 3 TD

**Top rushers**

- PHI – Bryce Brown – 24 rushes, 169 yards, 2 TD
- DAL – DeMarco Murray – 23 rushes, 83 yards, TD

**Top receivers**

- PHI – Jason Avant – 4 receptions, 79 yards
- DAL – Jason Witten – 6 receptions, 108 yards

**Top tacklers**

- PHI – Nnamdi Asomugha – 8
- DAL – Danny McCray – 10

With the loss, the Eagles fell to 3–9 securing them their 3rd losing season since 1999 and their first since 2005. Thus this season became their 3rd losing season under Andy Reid as the Eagles were swept by the Cowboys for the first time since 2009. Regardless that the Eagles were now 0–3 with Foles as a starter, Andy named him the team's starting QB for the remainder of the season. Also with the loss, the Eagles were eliminated from playoff contention.

==== Week 14: at Tampa Bay Buccaneers ====
Week Fourteen: Philadelphia Eagles at Tampa Bay Buccaneers – Game summary

Quarter	1	2	3	4	Total
**Eagles**	0	10	0	13	**23**
Buccaneers	0	0	7	14	**21**

at Raymond James Stadium, Tampa, Florida

- Date: December 9
- Game time: 1:00 pm. EST
- Game weather: 69 °F (21 °C), cloudy
- Game attendance: 64,941
- Referee: Ron Winter
- TV announcers (Fox): Dick Stockton, John Lynch and Jennifer Hale

Game information

**First quarter**

- No scoring plays

**Second quarter**

- PHI- Alex Henery, 28-yard field goal, 7:16 (PHI 3–0)
- PHI- Nick Foles, 10-yard run, Alex Henery XP good, 1:51 (PHI 10–0)

**Third quarter**

- TB- Mike Williams, 1-yard pass from Josh Freeman, Connor Barth XP good, 11:41 (PHI 10–7)

**Fourth quarter**

- TB- Vincent Jackson, 13-yard pass from Josh Freeman, Connor Barth XP good, 14:34 (TB 14–10)
- TB- Doug Martin, 4-yard run, Connor Barth XP good, 7:21 (TB 21–10)
- PHI- Clay Harbor, 11-yard pass from Nick Foles, two-point conversion attempt failed, 3:55 (TB 21–16)
- PHI- Jeremy Maclin, 1-yard pass from Nick Foles, Alex Henery XP good, 0:00 (PHI 23–21)

**Top passers**

- PHI – Nick Foles – 32/51, 381 yards, 2 TD
- TB – Josh Freeman – 14/34, 189 yards, 2 TD

**Top rushers**

- PHI – Nick Foles – 3 rushes, 27 yards, TD
- TB – Doug Martin – 28 rushes, 128 yards, TD

**Top receivers**

- PHI – Jason Avant – 7 receptions, 133 yards
- TB – Vincent Jackson – 6 receptions, 131 yards, TD

**Top tacklers**

- PHI – DeMeco Ryans, Mychal Kendricks – 7
- TB – Ronde Barber, Lavonte David – 9

Coming into the game, the Philadelphia Phillies baseball team had won more recently than the Eagles, but the Eagles snapped an eight-game losing streak and moved to 4–9 by defeating the Buccaneers in dramatic fashion via a touchdown pass from Nick Foles to Jeremy Maclin as time expired. Rookie Bryce Brown rushed the ball 12 times for only 6 yards, which left Foles as the leading rusher (3 rushes, 27 yards). Foles was prolific through the air as well going 32/51 for 381 yards and 2 TDs.

Although the touchdown which scored as time ran out put the Eagles ahead, the extra point still had to be attempted per NFL rule, because points for and points against are used by some tiebreakers. That extra point was good, and counted in the final score. This was the last win as head coach of the Eagles for Andy Reid.

==== Week 15: vs. Cincinnati Bengals ====
Week Fifteen: Cincinnati Bengals at Philadelphia Eagles – Game summary

Quarter	1	2	3	4	Total
**Bengals**	10	0	14	10	**34**
Eagles	0	13	0	0	**13**

at Lincoln Financial Field, Philadelphia, Pennsylvania

- Date: December 13
- Game time: 8:20 pm. EST
- Game weather: 33 °F (1 °C), (Clear)
- Game attendance: 69,144
- Referee: Carl Cheffers
- TV announcers (NFLN): Brad Nessler, Mike Mayock and Alex Flanagan

Game information

**First quarter**

- CIN- BenJarvus Green-Ellis, 1-yard run, Josh Brown XP good, 11:13 (CIN 7–0)
- CIN- Josh Brown, 24-yard field goal, 7:55 (CIN 10–0)

**Second quarter**

- PHI- Riley Cooper, 11-yard pass from Nick Foles, Alex Henery XP good, 11:46 (CIN 10–7)
- PHI- Alex Henery, 22-yard field goal, 7:40 (TIE 10–10)
- PHI- Alex Henery, 20-yard field goal, 0:20 (PHI 13–10)

**Third quarter**

- CIN- Andy Dalton, 11-yard run, Josh Brown XP good, 1:10 (CIN 17–13)
- CIN- Wallace Gilberry, 25-yard fumble return, Josh Brown XP good, 0:21 (CIN 24–13)

**Fourth quarter**

- CIN- Josh Brown, 32-yard field goal, 14:12 (CIN 27–13)
- CIN- A. J. Green, 5-yard pass from Andy Dalton, Josh Brown XP good, 12:47 (CIN 34–13)

**Top passers**

- CIN – Andy Dalton (13/27/127 TD)
- PHI – Nick Foles (16/33/180/TD/INT)

**Top rushers**

- CIN – BenJarvus Green-Ellis (25 carries 106 yards TD)
- PHI – Bryce Brown (16 carries 34 yards)

**Top receivers**

- CIN – A. J. Green (6 rec 57 yards TD)
- PHI – Jeremy Maclin (4 rec 73 yards)

**Top tacklers**

- CIN – Vontaze Burfict (6 tackles)
- PHI – Jamar Chaney (7 tackles)

The Philadelphia Eagles made their third appearance in a nationally broadcast game in four weeks against the Cincinnati Bengals on December 13, 2012.

==== Week 16: vs. Washington Redskins ====
Week Sixteen: Washington Redskins at Philadelphia Eagles – Game summary

Quarter	1	2	3	4	Total
**Redskins**	0	13	14	0	**27**
Eagles	7	3	3	7	**20**

at Lincoln Financial Field, Philadelphia, Pennsylvania

- Date: December 23
- Game time: 1:00 pm. EST
- Game weather: 45 °F (7 °C), (Sunny)
- Game attendance: 69,144
- Referee: Ed Hochuli
- TV announcers (Fox): Thom Brennaman, Brian Billick and Laura Okmin

Game information

**First quarter**

- PHI- Jeremy Maclin, 27-yard pass from Nick Foles, Alex Henery XP good, 10:09 (PHI 7–0)

**Second quarter**

- WSH- Kai Forbath, 45-yard field goal, 11:25 (PHI 7–3)
- WSH- Kai Forbath, 42-yard field goal, 7:37 (PHI 7–6)
- WSH- Josh Morgan, 11-yard pass from Robert Griffin III, Kai Forbath XP good, 3:30 (WSH 13–7)
- PHI- Alex Henery, 38-yard field goal, 0:18 (WSH 13–10)

**Third quarter**

- WSH- Alfred Morris, 10-yard run, Kai Forbath XP good, 12:33 (WSH 20–10)
- PHI- Alex Henery, 30-yard field goal, 8:01 (WSH 20–13)
- WSH- Santana Moss, 22-yard pass from Robert Griffin III, Kai Forbath XP good, 1:31 (WSH 27–13)

**Fourth quarter**

- PHI- Dion Lewis, 17-yard run, Alex Henery XP good, 8:55 (WSH 27–20)

**Top passers**

- WAS –
- PHI –

**Top rushers**

- WAS –
- PHI –

**Top receivers**

- WAS –
- PHI –

**Top tacklers**

- WAS –
- PHI –

==== Week 17: at New York Giants ====
Week Seventeen: Philadelphia Eagles at New York Giants – Game summary

Quarter	1	2	3	4	Total
Eagles	0	7	0	0	**7**
**Giants**	21	14	0	7	**42**

at MetLife Stadium, East Rutherford, New Jersey

- Date: December 30
- Game time: 1:00 pm. EST
- Game weather: 32 °F (0 °C), windy
- Game attendance: 80,657
- Referee: Tony Corrente
- TV announcers (Fox): Thom Brennaman, Brian Billick and Laura Okmin

Game information

**First quarter**

**Second quarter**

**Third quarter**

**Fourth quarter**

**Top passers**

- PHI –
- NYG –

**Top rushers**

- PHI –
- NYG –

**Top receivers**

- PHI –
- NYG –

**Top tacklers**

- PHI –
- NYG –

With the loss, the Eagles finish the season 4–12, their worst in 14 years. The Eagles fired head coach Andy Reid on Monday, December 31, 2012, ending his 14-year tenure coaching the team.

== Standings ==
NFC East
	W	L	T	PCT	DIV	CONF	PF	PA	STK
^{(4)} Washington Redskins	10	6	0	.625	5–1	8–4	436	388	W7
New York Giants	9	7	0	.563	3–3	8–4	429	344	W1
Dallas Cowboys	8	8	0	.500	3–3	5–7	376	400	L2
Philadelphia Eagles	4	12	0	.250	1–5	2–10	280	444	L3
