= 2012 New York Giants season =

88th season in franchise history

- Owner: John Mara; Steve Tisch
- General manager: Jerry Reese
- Head coach: Tom Coughlin
- Home stadium: MetLife Stadium

Results
- Record: 9–7
- Division place: 2nd NFC East
- Playoffs: Did not qualify
- All-Pros: RB David Wilson (2nd team)
- Pro Bowlers: QB Eli Manning; DE Jason Pierre-Paul; WR Victor Cruz; G Chris Snee

Uniform
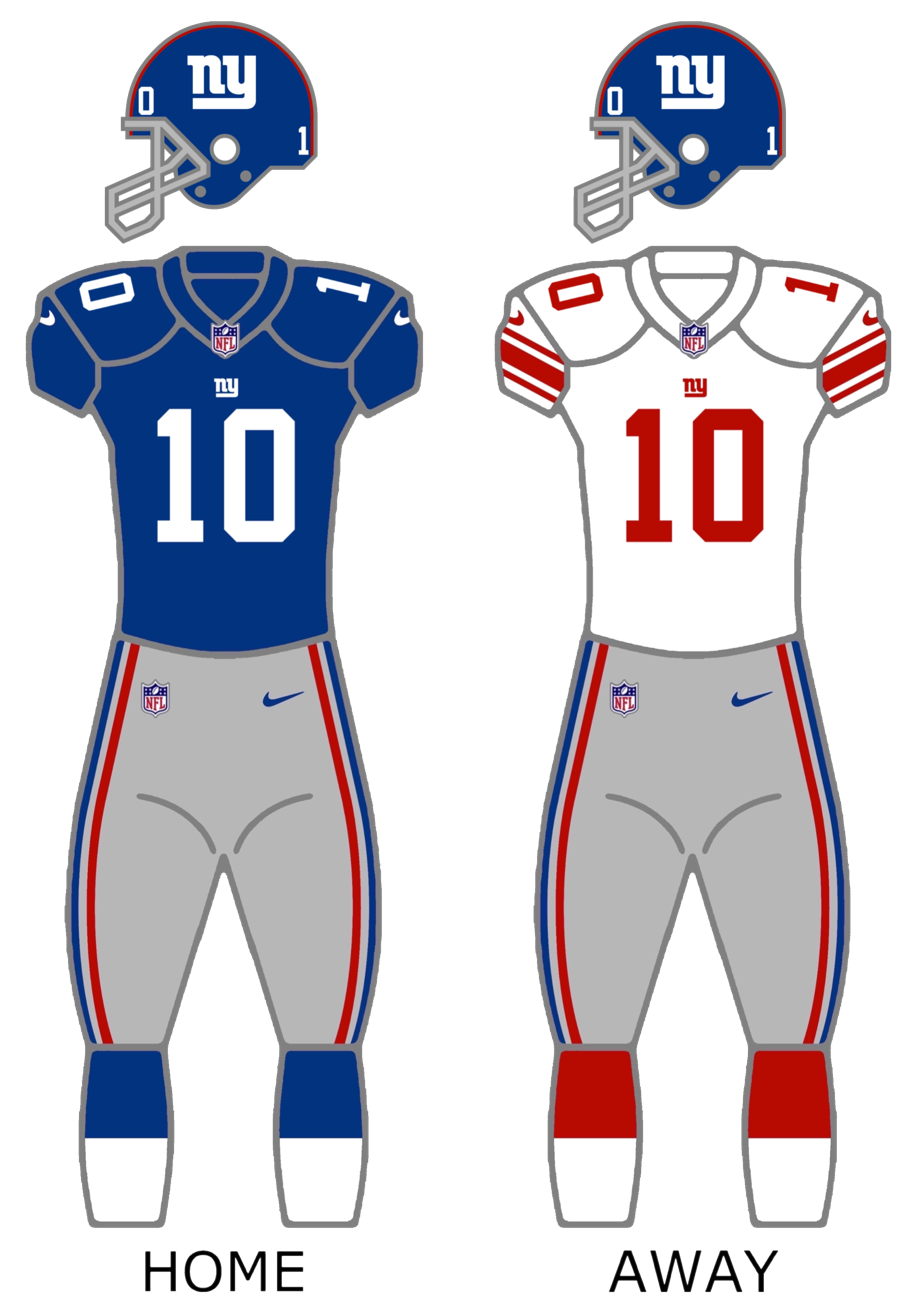

The 2012 season was the New York Giants' 88th in the National Football League (NFL), their ninth under head coach Tom Coughlin and their third playing home games at MetLife Stadium in East Rutherford, New Jersey.

The Giants began the 2012 season as defending Super Bowl champions for the fourth time in their history, by virtue of their 21–17 victory over the New England Patriots in Super Bowl XLVI. The Giants finished 9–7 for the second straight year, but failed to make the playoffs. Like in 2011, the Giants went 3–5 after a 6–2 start. The 2012 Giants were the first defending Super Bowl champions to miss the playoffs after 2009 Steelers, and the second team to do it three times after the Steelers in 2009.

== Personnel changes ==
On February 10, Giants quarterbacks coach Mike Sullivan was hired as the new offensive coordinator of the Tampa Bay Buccaneers. Sullivan was with the Giants since the beginning of Tom Coughlin's tenure as head coach of the Giants, serving as the wide receivers coach from 2004 to 2009 and as quarterbacks coach from 2010 to 2011.

The Giants offensive staff suffered another loss three days later (February 13) when assistant offensive line coach Jack Bicknell Jr. was hired by the Kansas City Chiefs to be their offensive line coach. Bicknell was with the Giants the past three seasons.

== Roster changes ==
=== Free agents ===
Position	Player	Tag	2012 Team	Notes and references
T/G	Stacy Andrews	UFA	TBD	
TE	Jake Ballard	ERFA	New England Patriots	Released by Giants after failing physical, claimed off waivers by Patriots
DT	Rocky Bernard	UFA	New York Giants	Signed a new deal June 11, 2012
MLB	Chase Blackburn	UFA	New York Giants	Signed a one-year deal April 13, 2012
CB	Will Blackmon	UFA	TBD	
QB	David Carr	UFA	New York Giants	Signed a one-year deal in mid March
WR	Michael Clayton	UFA	TBD	
CB	Michael Coe	UFA	New York Giants	Signed an undisclosed deal in March
MLB	Jonathan Goff	UFA	TBD	
FS	Deon Grant	UFA	TBD	
WR	Domenik Hixon	UFA	New York Giants	Signed a new deal with the Giants on March 2
RB	Brandon Jacobs	UFA	San Francisco 49ers	Signed a one-year deal on April 6, 2012, for a base of $950,000.
CB	Bruce Johnson	ERFA	TBD	
DT	Jimmy Kennedy	UFA	TBD	
SS	Derrick Martin	UFA	TBD	
T	Kareem McKenzie	UFA	TBD	
WR	Mario Manningham	UFA	San Francisco 49ers	Signed a two-year deal on March 18, 2012
TE/FB	Bear Pascoe	RFA	New York Giants	Signed a one-year contract on April 16, 2012
CB	Aaron Ross	UFA	Jacksonville Jaguars	Signed a three-year deal on March 20, 2012
DE	Dave Tollefson	UFA	Oakland Raiders	Signed a 2-year deal on April 6, 2012
WR	Devin Thomas	UFA	Chicago Bears	Signed a one-year contract on March 28, 2012
CB	Terrell Thomas	UFA	New York Giants	Signed a 4-year deal in March, 2012
CB	Justin Tryon	UFA	New York Giants	Re-signed in March
T	Tony Ugoh	UFA	none	announced retirement on July 30, 2012
P	Steve Weatherford	UFA	New York Giants	Signed a Five Year Deal on March 16, 2012

Player re-signed by the Giants

=== 2012 draft class ===
Round	Selection	Player	Position	College
1	32	David Wilson	Running back	Virginia Tech
2	63	Rueben Randle	Wide receiver	LSU
3	94	Jayron Hosley	Cornerback	Virginia Tech
4	127	Adrien Robinson	Tight end	Cincinnati
4	131	Brandon Mosley	Offensive tackle	Auburn
6	201	Matt McCants	Offensive tackle	UAB
7	239	Markus Kuhn	Defensive tackle	NC State

NOTES:

The Giants traded its fifth-round selection (#167 overall) to the Cincinnati Bengals in exchange for linebacker Keith Rivers.

The Giants were awarded an additional fourth-round pick (#131 overall) as a compensatory selection.

== Staff ==
2012 New York Giants staff
Front office: President/CEO – John Mara; Chairman/executive vice president – Steve Tisch; Senior vice president/general manager – Jerry Reese; Senior vice president of player personnel – Chris Mara; Assistant general manager – Kevin Abrams; Director of pro personnel – Ken Sternfeld; Senior pro personnel analyst – David Gettleman; Director of college scouting – Marc Ross; Director of football operations – Matt Harriss; Head coaches: Head coach – Tom Coughlin; Offensive coaches: Offensive coordinator – Kevin Gilbride; Quarterbacks – Sean Ryan; Running backs – Jerald Ingram; Wide receivers – Kevin Gilbride Jr.; Tight ends – Mike Pope; Offensive line – Pat Flaherty; Assistant offensive line – Matt Rhule; Offensive assistant – Lunda Wells	Defensive coaches: Defensive coordinator – Perry Fewell; Defensive line – Robert Nunn; Linebackers – Jim Herrmann; Secondary/cornerbacks – Peter Giunta; Secondary/safeties – David Merritt; Defensive assistant – Al Holcomb; Special teams coaches: Special teams coordinator – Tom Quinn; Assistant special teams – Larry Izzo; Strength and conditioning: Strength and conditioning – Jerry Palmieri; Assistant strength and conditioning – Markus Paul

== Final roster ==
2012 New York Giants roster
Quarterbacks (QB): 8 David Carr; 10 Eli Manning; Running backs (RB): 44 Ahmad Bradshaw; 45 Henry Hynoski FB; 38 Kregg Lumpkin; 41 Ryan Torain; 22 David Wilson KR; Wide receivers (WR): 13 Ramses Barden; 80 Victor Cruz; 87 Domenik Hixon; 12 Jerrel Jernigan; 88 Hakeem Nicks; 82 Rueben Randle PR; Tight ends (TE): 85 Martellus Bennett; 86 Bear Pascoe; 81 Adrien Robinson	Offensive linemen (OL): 64 David Baas C; 65 Will Beatty T; 77 Kevin Boothe G; 73 James Brewer T; 60 Selvish Capers G; 63 Jim Cordle C; 66 David Diehl T; 76 Chris Snee G; Defensive linemen (DL): 96 Marvin Austin DT; 95 Rocky Bernard DT; 99 Chris Canty DT; 97 Linval Joseph DT; 71 Adewale Ojomo DE; 90 Jason Pierre-Paul DE; 91 Justin Tuck DE; 72 Osi Umenyiora DE	Linebackers (LB): 93 Chase Blackburn MLB; 59 Michael Boley OLB; 58 Mark Herzlich MLB; 94 Mathias Kiwanuka OLB; 52 Spencer Paysinger OLB; 55 Keith Rivers OLB; 98 Adrian Tracy OLB; 57 Jacquian Williams OLB; Defensive backs (DB): 20 Prince Amukamara CB; 27 Stevie Brown SS; 36 Terrence Frederick CB; 31 Will Hill SS; 28 Jayron Hosley CB; 21 Kenny Phillips SS; 26 Antrel Rolle FS; 39 Tyler Sash FS; 30 Justin Tryon CB; 23 Corey Webster CB; Special teams (ST): 51 Zak DeOssie LS; 9 Lawrence Tynes K; 5 Steve Weatherford P	Practice squad: 64 Levy Adcock T; 31 Brandon Bing CB; 54 Matt Broha LB; 15 Dan DePalma WR; 46 Larry Donnell TE; 79 Stephen Goodin G; 74 Matt McCants T; 34 Laron Scott CB; Reserve: 47 Travis Beckum TE (IR); 35 Andre Brown RB (IR/DFR); 25 Bruce Johnson CB (IR); 78 Markus Kuhn DT (IR); 75 Sean Locklear T (IR); 67 Brandon Mosley G (IR); 73 Shaun Rogers DT (IR); 33 Da'Rel Scott RB (IR); 24 Terrell Thomas CB (IR); 69 Justin Trattou DE (IR); 29 Brian Witherspoon CB (IR); Rookies in italics 53 active, 11 reserve, 8 practice squad

== Schedule ==
=== Preseason ===
Week	Date	Opponent	Result	Record	Venue	Recap
1	August 10	at Jacksonville Jaguars	**L** 31–32	0–1	EverBank Field	Recap
2	August 18	at New York Jets	**W** 26–3	1–1	MetLife Stadium	Recap
3	August 24	Chicago Bears	**L** 17–20	1–2	MetLife Stadium	Recap
4	August 29	New England Patriots	**W** 6–3	2–2	MetLife Stadium	Recap

=== Regular season ===
Week	Date	Opponent	Result	Record	Venue	Recap
1	September 5	**Dallas Cowboys**	**L** 17–24	0–1	MetLife Stadium	Recap
2	September 16	Tampa Bay Buccaneers	**W** 41–34	1–1	MetLife Stadium	Recap
3	September 20	at Carolina Panthers	**W** 36–7	2–1	Bank of America Stadium	Recap
4	September 30	at **Philadelphia Eagles**	**L** 17–19	2–2	Lincoln Financial Field	Recap
5	October 7	Cleveland Browns	**W** 41–27	3–2	MetLife Stadium	Recap
6	October 14	at San Francisco 49ers	**W** 26–3	4–2	Candlestick Park	Recap
7	October 21	**Washington Redskins**	**W** 27–23	5–2	MetLife Stadium	Recap
8	October 28	at **Dallas Cowboys**	**W** 29–24	6–2	Cowboys Stadium	Recap
9	November 4	Pittsburgh Steelers	**L** 20–24	6–3	MetLife Stadium	Recap
10	November 11	at Cincinnati Bengals	**L** 13–31	6–4	Paul Brown Stadium	Recap
11	Bye					
12	November 25	Green Bay Packers	**W** 38–10	7–4	MetLife Stadium	Recap
13	December 3	at **Washington Redskins**	**L** 16–17	7–5	FedExField	Recap
14	December 9	New Orleans Saints	**W** 52–27	8–5	MetLife Stadium	Recap
15	December 16	at Atlanta Falcons	**L** 0–34	8–6	Georgia Dome	Recap
16	December 23	at Baltimore Ravens	**L** 14–33	8–7	M&T Bank Stadium	Recap
17	December 30	**Philadelphia Eagles**	**W** 42–7	9–7	MetLife Stadium	Recap

Note: Intra-division opponents are in bold text.

=== Game summaries ===
==== Week 1: vs. Dallas Cowboys ====
NFL Kickoff game

Week One: Dallas Cowboys at New York Giants – Game summary

Quarter	1	2	3	4	Total
**Cowboys**	0	7	10	7	**24**
Giants	0	3	7	7	**17**

at MetLife Stadium, East Rutherford, New Jersey

- Date: September 5
- Game time: 8:20 p.m. EDT
- Game weather: 77 °F (25 °C), Fair
- Game attendance: 82,287
- Referee: Jim Core
- TV announcers (NBC): Al Michaels, Cris Collinsworth and Michele Tafoya

Game information

**Second quarter**

- NYG Lawrence Tynes 22-yard FG (4 plays, 3 yards, 1:20) (NYG 3-0)
- DAL Ogletree 10-yard pass from Romo (Dan Bailey kick) (7–73, 2:33) (DAL 7-3)

**Third quarter**

- DAL Ogletree 40-yard pass from Romo (Bailey kick) (9–80, 4:36) (DAL 14-3)
- NYG Bradshaw 10-yard run (Tynes kick) (9–89, 5:13) (DAL 14-10)
- DAL Bailey 33-yard FG (8–65, 4:31) (DAL 17-10)

**Fourth quarter**

- DAL Miles Austin 34-yard pass from Romo (Bailey kick) (8–82, 7:06) (DAL 24-10)
- NYG Martellus Bennett 9-yard pass from Manning (Tynes kick) (12–79, 3:21) (DAL 24-17)

**Top passers**

- DAL – Tony Romo – 22/29, 307 YDS, 3 TD, INT
- NYG – Eli Manning – 21/32, 213 YDS, TD

**Top rushers**

- DAL – DeMarco Murray – 20 CAR, 131 YDS
- NYG – Ahmad Bradshaw – 17 CAR, 78 YDS, TD

**Top receivers**

- DAL – Kevin Ogletree – 8 REC, 114 YDS, 2 TD
- NYG – Victor Cruz – 6 REC, 58 YDS

**Top tacklers**

- DAL – Sean Lee – 10 TKL, 2 AST
- NYG – Antrel Rolle – 9 TKL

With their Super Bowl XLVI title to defend, the Giants began its 2012 campaign at home in the Annual Kickoff Game against their NFC East foe, the Dallas Cowboys. After a scoreless first quarter, New York struck first in the second quarter with a 22-yard field goal from kicker Lawrence Tynes. The Cowboys would close out the half with quarterback Tony Romo completing a 10-yard touchdown pass to wide receiver Kevin Ogletree.

Dallas added onto its lead in the third quarter as Romo completed a 40-yard touchdown to Ogletree. New York struck back with running back Ahmad Bradshaw's 10-yard touchdown run, but the Cowboys answered with kicker Dan Bailey making a 33-yard field goal. Dallas came right back in the fourth quarter with Romo completing a 34-yard touchdown pass to wide receiver Miles Austin. The Giants tried to rally as Super Bowl XLVI MVP quarterback Eli Manning completed a 9-yard touchdown pass to tight end Martellus Bennett, but the Cowboys' offense ran out the clock and preserved the win.

With the loss, New York began its season at 0–1 and became the first defending Super Bowl Champion team to lose a regular season opener since the Broncos in 1999.

==== Week 2: vs. Tampa Bay Buccaneers ====
Week Two: Tampa Bay Buccaneers at New York Giants – Game summary

Quarter	1	2	3	4	Total
Buccaneers	3	21	3	7	**34**
**Giants**	6	7	3	25	**41**

at MetLife Stadium, East Rutherford, New Jersey

- Date: September 16
- Game time: 1:00 pm. EDT
- Game weather: 73 °F (23 °C), Mostly Sunny
- Game attendance: 76,964
- Referee: Jim Core
- TV announcers (Fox): Joe Buck, Troy Aikman and Pam Oliver

Game information

**First quarter**

- NYG Tynes 37-yard FG (6–51, 2:17) (NYG 3-0)
- TB Connor Barth 45-yard FG (7–60, 4:01) (Tied 3-3)
- NYG Tynes 24-yard FG (12–63, 5:48) (NYG 6-3)

**Second quarter**

- TB Jackson 29-yard pass from Freeman (Barth kick) (3–28, 0:56) (TB 10-6)
- TB Martin 8-yard run (Barth kick) (2–13, 0:47) (TB 17-6)
- NYG Nicks 23-yard pass from Manning (Tynes kick) (8–80, 4:25) (TB 17-13)
- TB Eric Wright 60-yard interception return (Barth kick) (TB 24-13)

**Third quarter**

- TB Barth 52-yard FG (5–14, 1:46) (TB 27-13)
- NYG Tynes 36-yard FG (13–64, 5:40) (TB 27-16)

**Fourth quarter**

- NYG Tynes 24-yard FG (9–30, 2:59) (TB 27-19)
- NYG Cruz 80-yard pass from Manning (Brown run) (3–88, 0:53) (Tied 27-27)
- NYG Bennett 33-yard pass from Manning (Tynes kick) (4–67, 1:44) (NYG 34-27)
- TB Mike Williams 41-yard pass from Freeman (Barth kick) (5–80, 2:01) (Tied 34-34)
- NYG Brown 2-yard run (Tynes kick) (4–80, 1:27) (NYG 41-34)

**Top passers**

- TB – Josh Freeman – 15/28, 243 YDS, 2 TD, 2 INT
- NYG – Eli Manning – 31/51, 510 YDS, 3 TD, 3 INT

**Top rushers**

- TB – Doug Martin – 20 CAR, 66 YDS, TD
- NYG – Andre Brown – 13 CAR, 71 YDS, TD

**Top receivers**

- TB – Vincent Jackson – 5 REC, 128 YDS, TD
- NYG – Hakeem Nicks – 10 REC, 199 YDS, TD

**Top tacklers**

- TB – Mason Foster – 12 TKL, AST
- NYG – Rocky Bernard – 4 TKL, AST; Jayron Hosley – 4 TKL, AST; Jason Pierre-Paul – 4 TKL, 4 AST, SK

After a season-opening home loss to the Cowboys, the Giants were looking to win their first game of the season. Although Tampa Bay led the Giants 24–13 at halftime, the Giants rallied in the fourth quarter to score 25 points and win their first game, improving to a 1–1 home record and a 1–1 overall record. A mild controversy erupted on the Giants' final kneel in the closing seconds of the game when Tampa Bay head coach Greg Schiano ordered his defensive linemen to blitz Giants' quarterback Eli Manning, presumably in the hope that this would lead to a forced fumble and subsequent touchdown to steal the victory. However, this did not happen.

==== Week 3: at Carolina Panthers ====
Week Three: New York Giants at Carolina Panthers – Game summary

Quarter	1	2	3	4	Total
**Giants**	10	10	6	10	**36**
Panthers	0	0	7	0	**7**

at Bank of America Stadium, Charlotte, North Carolina

- Date: September 20
- Game time: 8:20 pm. EDT
- Game weather: 75 °F (24 °C), Partly Cloudy
- Game attendance: 73,951
- Referee: Robert Frazer
- TV announcers (NFLN): Brad Nessler, Mike Mayock and Alex Flanagan

Game information

**First quarter**

- NYG Bennett 14-yard pass from Manning (Tynes kick) (8–80, 3:22) (NYG 7-0)
- NYG Tynes 47-yard FG (9–51, 4:44) (NYG 10-0)

**Second quarter**

- NYG Brown 1-yard run (Tynes kick) (9–72, 4:39) (NYG 17-0)
- NYG Tynes 49-yard FG (11–57, 5:59) (NYG 20-0)

**Third quarter**

- NYG Tynes 30-yard FG (4–7, 2:03) (NYG 23-0)
- CAR Newton 1-yard run (Justin Medlock kick) (13–80, 6:24) (NYG 23-7)
- NYG Tynes 36-yard FG (10–63, 5:35) (NYG 26-7)

**Fourth quarter**

- NYG Brown 1-yard run (Tynes kick) (8–48, 3:51) (NYG 33-7)
- NYG Tynes 27-yard FG (7–10, 3:17) (NYG 36-7)

**Top passers**

- NYG – Eli Manning – 27/35, 288 YDS, TD
- CAR – Cam Newton – 16/30, 242 YDS, 3 INT

**Top rushers**

- NYG – Andre Brown – 20 CAR, 113 YDS, 2 TD
- CAR – DeAngelo Williams – 11 CAR, 50 YDS

**Top receivers**

- NYG – Ramses Barden – 9 REC, 138 YDS
- CAR – Greg Olsen – 7 REC, 98 YDS

**Top tacklers**

- NYG – Antrel Rolle – 7 TKL
- CAR – Josh Norman – 8 TKL, 3 AST

The Giants' first road game came against a Carolina Panthers team led by second-year quarterback Cam Newton. It was both teams' only Thursday Night Football appearance of the season. The Giants had no trouble with the Panthers, leading 20–0 at halftime and 36–7 at the end of the game. With the win, the Giants improved to 2–1 and reclaimed a share of the NFC East title with the Philadelphia Eagles, who they would play the following week.

==== Week 4: at Philadelphia Eagles ====
Week Four: New York Giants at Philadelphia Eagles – Game summary

Quarter	1	2	3	4	Total
Giants	0	3	7	7	**17**
**Eagles**	0	7	6	6	**19**

at Lincoln Financial Field, Philadelphia

- Date: September 30
- Game time: 8:20 pm. EDT
- Game weather: 63 °F (17 °C), Partly Cloudy
- Game attendance: 69,144
- Referee: Ron Winter
- TV announcers (NBC): Al Michaels, Cris Collinsworth and Michele Tafoya

Game information

**Second quarter**

- PHI Jackson 19-yard pass from Vick (Alex Henery kick) (11–70, 4:17) (PHI 7-0)
- NYG Tynes 25-yard FG (10–81, 1:42) (PHI 7-3)

**Third quarter**

- PHI Henery 20-yard FG (9–78, 5:05) (PHI 10-3)
- NYG Cruz 14-yard pass from Manning (Tynes kick) (8–57, 4:27) (Tied 10-10)
- PHI Henery 48-yard FG (8–50, 3:21) (PHI 13-10)

**Fourth quarter**

- PHI Henery 35-yard FG (11–74, 5:24) (PHI 16-10)
- NYG Bear Pascoe 6-yard pass from Manning (Tynes kick) (5–83, 2:40) (NYG 17-16)
- PHI Henery 26-yard FG (12–75, 4:56) (PHI 19-17)

**Top passers**

- NYG – Eli Manning – 24/42, 309 YDS, 2 TD, INT
- PHI – Michael Vick – 19/30, 241 YDS, TD

**Top rushers**

- NYG – Ahmad Bradshaw – 13 CAR, 39 YDS
- PHI – LeSean McCoy – 23 CAR, 123 YDS

**Top receivers**

- NYG – Domenik Hixon – 6 REC, 114 YDS
- PHI – DeSean Jackson – 6 REC, 99 YDS, TD

**Top tacklers**

- NYG – Chase Blackburn – 8 TKL, 2 AST, SK
- PHI – Brandon Boykin – 4 TKL; Kurt Coleman – 4 TKL, 2 AST; Dominique Rodgers-Cromartie – 4 TKL, AST

The Giants traveled to Philadelphia for a Sunday Night Football showdown against the Eagles. After a defensive first quarter in which neither offense scored any points, the Eagles took a 7–3 lead into halftime. The Giants came back with two touchdowns in the second half, but ultimately lost by two points after a failed long field goal by Lawrence Tynes in the closing seconds of the game. With the loss, the Giants fell to 2–2, the Eagles claimed sole possession of the NFC East title, and the Giants record against the Eagles worsened to 1–8 in their last nine meetings, dating back to the 2008 NFL season.

==== Week 5: vs. Cleveland Browns ====
Week Five: Cleveland Browns at New York Giants – Game summary

Quarter	1	2	3	4	Total
Browns	14	3	3	7	**27**
**Giants**	7	20	7	7	**41**

at MetLife Stadium, East Rutherford, New Jersey

- Date: October 7
- Game time: 1:00 pm. EDT
- Game weather: 51 °F (11 °C), Rain
- Game attendance: 79,911
- Referee: Clete Blakeman
- TV announcers (CBS): Greg Gumbel and Dan Dierdorf

Game information

**First quarter**

- CLE Richardson 15-yard run (Phil Dawson kick) (2–22, 0:37) (CLE 7-0)
- CLE Gordon 62-yard pass from Weeden (Dawson kick) (5–80, 2:11) (CLE 14-0)
- NYG Cruz 3-yard pass from Manning (Tynes kick) (11–92, 6:41) (CLE 14-7)

**Second quarter**

- CLE Dawson 32-yard FG (10–50, 4:43) (CLE 17-7)
- NYG Tynes 29-yard FG (14–68, 6:53) (CLE 17-10)
- NYG Bradshaw 4-yard run (Tynes kick) (2–40, 0:54) (Tied 17-17)
- NYG Cruz 7-yard pass from Manning (Tynes kick) (5–29, 1:27) (NYG 24-17)
- NYG Tynes 40-yard FG (2–36, 0:17) (NYG 27-17)

**Third quarter**

- NYG Cruz 28-yard pass from Manning (Tynes kick) (9–95, 5:13) (NYG 34-17)
- CLE Dawson 41-yard FG (4–7, 1:39) (NYG 34-20)

**Fourth quarter**

- NYG David Wilson 40-yard run (Tynes kick) (6–80, 3:24) (NYG 41-20)
- CLE Gordon 20-yard pass from Weeden (Dawson kick) (7–76, 1:45) (NYG 41-27)

**Top passers**

- CLE – Brandon Weeden – 22/35, 291 YDS, 2 TD, 2 INT
- NYG – Eli Manning – 25/37, 259 YDS, 3 TD, INT

**Top rushers**

- CLE – Trent Richardson – 17 CAR, 81 YDS, TD
- NYG – Ahmad Bradshaw – 30 CAR, 200 YDS, TD

**Top receivers**

- CLE – Josh Gordon – 2 REC, 82 YDS, 2 TD
- NYG – Rueben Randle – 6 REC, 82 YDS

**Top tacklers**

- CLE – Buster Skrine – 6 TKL
- NYG – Corey Webster – 7 TKL, AST

After a disappointing loss to the Eagles, the Giants returned home for an afternoon game against the Cleveland Browns. Led by rookie quarterback Brandon Weeden, the Browns quickly amassed a 14–0 lead early in the first quarter. However, the Giants retook the lead before halftime and did not sacrifice it again. With the win, the Giants improved to 3–2 and began what would ultimately be a four-game winning streak throughout October.

==== Week 6: at San Francisco 49ers ====
Week Six: New York Giants at San Francisco 49ers – Game summary

Quarter	1	2	3	4	Total
**Giants**	0	10	13	3	**26**
49ers	3	0	0	0	**3**

at Candlestick Park, San Francisco

- Date: October 14
- Game time: 4:25 pm. EDT/1:25 p.m. PDT
- Game weather: 61 °F (16 °C), Sunny
- Game attendance: 69,732
- Referee: John Parry
- TV announcers (Fox): Joe Buck, Troy Aikman and Pam Oliver

Game information

**First quarter**

- SF David Akers 42-yard FG (12–61, 5:27) (SF 3-0)

**Second quarter**

- NYG Cruz 6-yard pass from Manning (Tynes kick) (7–67, 3:50) (NYG 7-3)
- NYG Tynes 34-yard FG (8–51, 4:34) (NYG 10-3)

**Third quarter**

- NYG Bradshaw 1-yard run (Tynes kick) (7–32, 3:12) (NYG 17-3)
- NYG Tynes 30-yard FG (4–0, 0:16) (NYG 20-3)
- NYG Tynes 22-yard FG (4–1, 1:33) (NYG 23-3)

**Fourth quarter**

- NYG Tynes 32-yard FG (13–72, 7:10) (NYG 26-3)

**Top passers**

- NYG – Eli Manning – 15/28, 193 YDS, TD
- SF – Alex Smith – 19/30, 200 YDS, 3 INT

**Top rushers**

- NYG – Ahmad Bradshaw – 27 CAR, 116 YDS, TD
- SF – Frank Gore – 8 CAR, 36 YDS

**Top receivers**

- NYG – Domenik Hixon – 4 REC, 78 YDS
- SF – Randy Moss – 2 REC, 75 YDS

**Top tacklers**

- NYG – Prince Amukamara – 6 TKL; Michael Boley – 6 TKL; Antrel Rolle – 6 TKL
- SF – Patrick Willis – 8 TKL

The Giants traveled to San Francisco for a rematch of last season's NFC Championship game, in which the Giants won in overtime to advance to Super Bowl XLVI. The San Francisco 49ers were looking to avenge their playoff loss against the Giants, and had just come off back-to-back landslide victories against the Jets and Bills. However, the Giants defense allowed only one field goal and the Giants ultimately won the game 26–3, sending the 49ers to their first and only home loss of the season. Head coach Tom Coughlin also recorded his 86th win with the Giants, surpassing Bill Parcells' previous record of 85 wins during his tenure (1983-1990), and became the 2nd winningest head coach in franchise history, only behind Steve Owen, whom coached the team from 1930 to 1953.

With the win, the Giants improved to 4–2. Also, with the Eagles' loss to the Lions earlier in the day, the Giants gained sole possession of first place in the NFC East.

==== Week 7: vs. Washington Redskins ====
Week Seven: Washington Redskins at New York Giants – Game summary

Quarter	1	2	3	4	Total
Redskins	3	10	0	10	**23**
**Giants**	0	13	0	14	**27**

at MetLife Stadium, East Rutherford, New Jersey

- Date: October 21
- Game time: 1:00 pm. EDT
- Game weather: 61 °F (16 °C), Mostly Sunny
- Game attendance: 81,352
- Referee: Ed Hochuli
- TV announcers (Fox): Thom Brennaman, Troy Aikman and Pam Oliver

Game information

**First quarter**

- WAS Kai Forbath 20-yard FG (17–93, 9:11) (WAS 3-0)

**Second quarter**

- NYG Andre Brown 1-yard run (Tynes kick) (12–80, 4:32) (NYG 7-3)
- WAS Santana Moss 26-yard pass from Griffin (Forbath kick) (8–80, 3:56) (WAS 10-7)
- NYG Tynes 27-yard FG (10–63, 4:52) (Tied 10-10)
- WAS Forbath 43-yard FG (6–55, 2:04) (WAS 13-10)
- NYG Tynes 39-yard FG (10–59, 1:47) (Tied 13-13)

**Fourth quarter**

- NYG Bradshaw 1-yard run (Tynes kick) (7–35, 3:47) (NYG 20-13)
- WAS Forbath 45-yard FG (4–5, 1:40) (NYG 20-16)
- WAS Moss 30-yard pass from Griffin (Forbath kick) (7–77, 1:27) (WAS 23-20)
- NYG Cruz 77-yard pass from Manning (Tynes kick) (2–77, 0:19) (NYG 27-23)

**Top passers**

- WAS – Robert Griffin III – 20/28, 258 YDS, 2 TD, INT
- NYG – Eli Manning – 26/40, 337 YDS, TD, 2 INT

**Top rushers**

- WAS – Alfred Morris – 22 CAR, 120 YDS
- NYG – Ahmad Bradshaw – 12 CAR, 43 YDS, TD

**Top receivers**

- WAS – Logan Paulsen – 4 REC, 76 YDS
- NYG – Victor Cruz – 7 REC, 131 YDS, TD

**Top tacklers**

- WAS – Madieu Williams – 6 TKL, AST
- NYG – Chase Blackburn – 6 TKL, 4 AST; Stevie Brown – 6 TKL; Keith Rivers – 6 TKL

The Giants returned home for another divisional battle, this time against the Washington Redskins. Washington had swept the Giants last year, and drafted quarterback Robert Griffin III with the second overall pick in the 2012 NFL draft. The Redskins took a three-point lead late in the game, but a 77-yard touchdown pass from Manning to Victor Cruz in the last minutes of the game allowed the Giants to claim the victory. With the win, the Giants improved to 5–2 and won their first NFC East game of the season.

==== Week 8: at Dallas Cowboys ====
Week Eight: New York Giants at Dallas Cowboys – Game summary

Quarter	1	2	3	4	Total
**Giants**	13	10	0	6	**29**
Cowboys	0	10	14	0	**24**

at Cowboys Stadium, Arlington, Texas

- Date: October 28
- Game time: 4:25 pm. EDT/3:25 p.m. CDT
- Game weather: 62 °F (17 °C), Sunny
- Game attendance: 94,067
- Referee: Scott Green
- TV announcers (Fox): Thom Brennaman, Troy Aikman and Pam Oliver

Game information

**First quarter**

- NYG Tynes 41-yard FG (7–57, 3:07) (NYG 3-0)
- NYG Tynes 37-yard FG (4–8, 2:00) (NYG 6-0)
- NYG Andre Brown 1-yard run (Tynes kick) (4–31, 2:01) (NYG 13-0)

**Second quarter**

- NYG Tynes 26-yard FG (4–7, 1:29) (NYG 16-0)
- NYG Pierre-Paul 28-yard interception return (Tynes kick) (NYG 23-0)
- DAL Jones 4-yard run (Bailey kick) (8–72, 3:07) (NYG 23-7)
- DAL Bailey 51-yard FG (6–55, 1:39) (NYG 23-10)

**Third quarter**

- DAL Romo 1-yard run (Bailey kick) (11–86, 5:44) (NYG 23-17)
- DAL John Phillips 1-yard pass from Romo (Bailey kick) (8–59, 4:24) (DAL 24-23)

**Fourth quarter**

- NYG Tynes 43-yard FG (8–60, 4:26) (NYG 26-24)
- NYG Tynes 37-yard FG (6–26, 3:09) (NYG 29-24)

**Top passers**

- NYG – Eli Manning – 15/29, 192 YDS, INT
- DAL – Tony Romo – 36/62, 437 YDS, TD, 4 INT

**Top rushers**

- NYG – Ahmad Bradshaw – 22 CAR, 78 YDS
- DAL – Felix Jones – 13 CAR, 19 YDS, TD

**Top receivers**

- NYG – Rueben Randle – 2 REC, 68 YDS
- DAL – Jason Witten – 18 REC, 167 YDS

**Top tacklers**

- NYG – Stevie Brown – 6 TKL; Keith Rivers – 6 TKL
- DAL – Brandon Carr – 5 TKL

The Giants visited the Dallas Cowboys, where they hoped to avenge their Week 1 home loss. Although the Giants quickly amassed a 23-point lead, the Cowboys responded with 24 unanswered points to take the lead in the 3rd quarter. The Giants ultimately scored a pair of field goals and held on to win 29–24. With the win, the Giants improved to 6–2 and continued to be unwelcome visitors at Cowboys Stadium, where they are now 4–0.

The game, whose viewing area consisted of much of the northeast coast of the United States, was frequently interrupted by updates on the approach of Hurricane Sandy – a storm that was expected to directly impact the northeast United States that night and the following day.

==== Week 9: vs. Pittsburgh Steelers ====
Week Nine: Pittsburgh Steelers at New York Giants – Game summary

Quarter	1	2	3	4	Total
**Steelers**	0	10	0	14	**24**
Giants	0	14	6	0	**20**

at MetLife Stadium, East Rutherford, New Jersey

- Date: November 4
- Game time: 4:25 pm. EST
- Game weather: 44 °F (7 °C), Mostly Clear
- Game attendance: 80,991
- Referee: Bill Leavy
- TV announcers (CBS): Jim Nantz and Phil Simms

Game information

**Second quarter**

- PIT Emmanuel Sanders 4-yard pass from Roethlisberger (Shaun Suisham kick) (11–58, 5:54) (PIT 7-0)
- NYG Andre Brown 1-yard run (Tynes kick) (8–72, 5:08) (Tied 7-7)
- NYG Boley 70-yard fumble return (Tynes kick) (NYG 14-7)
- PIT Suisham 30-yard FG (4–47, 0:31) (NYG 14-10)

**Third quarter**

- NYG Tynes 50-yard FG (9–61, 4:37) (NYG 17-10)
- NYG Tynes 23-yard FG (9–28, 5:37) (NYG 20-10)

**Fourth quarter**

- PIT Wallace 51-yard pass from Roethlisberger (Suisham kick) (5–75, 2:27) (NYG 20-17)
- PIT Redman 1-yard run (Suisham kick) (9–51, 4:53) (PIT 24-20)

**Top passers**

- PIT – Ben Roethlisberger – 21/30, 216 YDS, 2 TD, INT
- NYG – Eli Manning – 10/24, 125 YDS, INT

**Top rushers**

- PIT – Isaac Redman – 26 CAR, 147 YDS, TD
- NYG – Ahmad Bradshaw – 15 CAR, 48 YDS

**Top receivers**

- PIT – Mike Wallace – 3 REC, 66 YDS, TD
- NYG – Victor Cruz – 5 REC, 67 YDS

**Top tacklers**

- PIT – Ryan Clark – 6 TKL, 2 AST; Larry Foote – 6 TKL, AST
- NYG – Michael Boley – 7 TKL, 3 AST; Stevie Brown – 7 TKL, 2 AST

At the time of this game, northern New Jersey (and, indeed, a vast majority of the Northeast megalopolis area) was recovering from the widespread damage and power outages caused by Hurricane Sandy. Played just days after the storm made landfall on the east coast, the blackouts and flooding even affected the visiting Steelers' travel schedule, and the team would be forced to fly into the area on the morning of the contest as opposed to the usual day beforehand.

Both teams traded possessions through the first quarter before Steelers' wide receiver Emmanuel Sanders caught a 4-yard touchdown pass from quarterback Ben Roethlisberger three minutes into the second period. A Shaun Suisham extra point gave the Steelers a 7–0 lead. The hometown Giants answered, tying up the game with a 1-yard run by Andre Brown. Shortly after, with around five minutes remaining in the half, New York's Osi Umenyiora was able to knock the ball from Roethlisberger's hand as the quarterback was attempting a pass. Giants linebacker Michael Boley took full advantage of the turnover, scooping up the fumble and giving the Giants a 14–7 lead on a 70-yard touchdown return. The Steelers were able to put together a final drive of the half, and a 30-yard field goal by Shaun Suisham narrowed the Giants' lead to four points at the half.

Seven minutes into the third quarter, Giants' kicker Lawrence Tynes extended the home team's lead by three via a 50-yard field goal. With a minute to go in the period, Tynes would successfully convert a 23-yard attempt and give the Giants a ten-point lead with a quarter to play.

A 51-yard touchdown pass from Roethlisberger to Mike Wallace would cut into the Giants' lead less than a minute into the fourth. New York would fail to accumulate any further points in the contest and, despite a botched fake field goal attempt by the Steelers, a 1-yard touchdown run by Pittsburgh back Isaac Redman gave the Steelers the lead and, eventually, the win.

With the loss, the Giants fell to 6–3.

==== Week 10: at Cincinnati Bengals ====
Week Ten: New York Giants at Cincinnati Bengals – Game summary

Quarter	1	2	3	4	Total
Giants	3	3	0	7	**13**
**Bengals**	14	3	14	0	**31**

at Paul Brown Stadium, Cincinnati

- Date: November 11
- Game time: 1:00 pm. EST
- Game weather: 69 °F (21 °C), Partly Cloudy
- Game attendance: 56,614
- Referee: Mike Carey
- TV announcers (Fox): Thom Brennaman, Brian Billick and Laura Okmin

Game information

**First quarter**

- CIN Green 56-yard pass from Dalton (Mike Nugent kick) (5–79, 2:26) (CIN 7-0)
- CIN Andrew Hawkins 11-yard pass from Dalton (Nugent kick) (3–11, 0:18) (CIN 14-0)
- NYG Tynes 23-yard FG (6–22, 3:00) (CIN 14-3)

**Second quarter**

- CIN Nugent 28-yard FG (15–60, 7:46) (CIN 17-3)
- NYG Tynes 31-yard FG (14–69, 4:06) (CIN 17-6)

**Third quarter**

- CIN Jermaine Gresham 10-yard pass from Dalton (Nugent kick) (3–12, 0:35) (CIN 24-6)
- CIN Mohamed Sanu 10-yard pass from Dalton (Nugent kick) (3–16, 1:21) (CIN 31-6)

**Fourth quarter**

- NYG Andre Brown 2-yard run (Tynes kick) (13–98, 5:22) (CIN 31-13)

**Top passers**

- NYG – Eli Manning – 29/46, 215 YDS, 2 INT
- CIN – Andy Dalton – 21/30, 199 YDS, 4 TD

**Top rushers**

- NYG – Andre Brown – 7 CAR, 65 YDS, TD
- CIN – BenJarvus Green-Ellis – 15 CAR, 50 YDS

**Top receivers**

- NYG – Hakeem Nicks – 9 REC, 75 YDS
- CIN – A. J. Green – 7 REC, 85 YDS, TD

**Top tacklers**

- NYG – Prince Amukamara – 7 TKL, 3 AST
- CIN – Terence Newman – 6 TKL, AST

The Giants travelled to a cloudy Cincinnati to face the Bengals. The Bengals, who were in the midst of a losing streak, came out strong and handily defeated the Giants 31–13. With the loss, the Giants fell to 6–4 and entered their bye week.

==== Week 12: vs. Green Bay Packers ====
Week Twelve: Green Bay Packers at New York Giants – Game summary

Quarter	1	2	3	4	Total
Packers	7	3	0	0	**10**
**Giants**	17	14	7	0	**38**

at Metlife Stadium, East Rutherford, New Jersey

- Date: November 25
- Game time: 8:20 pm. EST
- Game weather: 34 °F (1 °C), Mostly Clear
- Game attendance: 80,365
- Referee: Terry McAulay
- TV announcers (NBC): Al Michaels, Cris Collinsworth and Michele Tafoya

Game information

**First quarter**

- NYG Andre Brown 2-yard run (Tynes kick) (6–74, 2:22) (NYG 7-0)
- GB Nelson 61-yard pass from Rodgers (Mason Crosby kick) (4–77, 1:54) (Tied 7-7)
- NYG Randle 16-yard pass from Manning (Tynes kick) (8–55, 4:37) (NYG 14-7)
- NYG Tynes 43-yard FG (4–8, 2:03) (NYG 17-7)

**Second quarter**

- NYG Cruz 9-yard pass from Manning (Tynes kick) (8–61, 3:58) (NYG 24-7)
- GB Crosby 28-yard FG (10–62, 6:00) (NYG 24-10)
- NYG Bradshaw 13-yard run (Tynes kick) (2–23, 0:19) (NYG 31-10)

**Third quarter**

- NYG Nicks 13-yard pass from Manning (Tynes kick) (6–53, 2:27) (NYG 38-10)

**Top passers**

- GB – Aaron Rodgers – 14/25, 219 YDS, TD, INT
- NYG – Eli Manning – 16/30, 249 YDS, 3 TD

**Top rushers**

- GB – James Starks – 8 CAR, 35 YDS
- NYG – Andre Brown – 13 CAR, 64 YDS, TD

**Top receivers**

- GB – Jordy Nelson – 2 REC, 71 YDS, TD
- NYG – Hakeem Nicks – 5 REC, 77 YDS, TD

**Top tacklers**

- GB – A. J. Hawk – 8 TKL, 2 AST
- NYG – Mathias Kiwanuka – 5 TKL, AST, 2 SK; Kenny Phillips – 5 TKL; Antrel Rolle – 5 TKL

The Giants hosted the Packers on Sunday Night Football, as quarterbacks Eli Manning and Aaron Rodgers faced each other for the fourth time in three seasons. Although the Packers were expected to avenge their playoff loss from last season, the Giants took a 31–10 lead into halftime and ultimately won the game 38–10, snapping a two-game losing streak and improving to a 7–4 record.

==== Week 13: at Washington Redskins ====
Week Thirteen: New York Giants at Washington Redskins – Game summary

Quarter	1	2	3	4	Total
Giants	3	10	3	0	**16**
**Redskins**	7	3	0	7	**17**

at FedExField, Landover, Maryland

- Date: December 3
- Game time: 8:30 pm. EST
- Game weather: 55 °F (13 °C), Partly Cloudy
- Game attendance: 80,246
- Referee: Jerome Boger
- TV announcers (ESPN): Mike Tirico, Jon Gruden and Lisa Salters

Game information

**First quarter**

- NYG Tynes 39-yard FG (11–69, 6:32) (NYG 3-0)
- WAS Josh Morgan 13-yard fumble recovery (Forbath kick) (4–80, 2:06) (WAS 7-3)

**Second quarter**

- NYG Bennett 4-yard pass from Manning (Tynes kick) (13–85, 7:23) (NYG 10-7)
- WAS Forbath 33-yard FG (6–51, 1:51) (Tied 10-10)
- NYG Tynes 40-yard FG (6–54, 0:41) (NYG 13-10)

**Third quarter**

- NYG Tynes 35-yard FG (8–75, 3:36) (NYG 16-10)

**Fourth quarter**

- WAS Garçon 8-yard pass from Griffin (Forbath kick) (12–86, 6:38) (WAS 17-16)

**Top passers**

- NYG – Eli Manning – 20/33, 280 YDS, TD
- WAS – Robert Griffin III – 13/21, 163 YDS, TD

**Top rushers**

- NYG – Ahmad Bradshaw – 24 CAR, 103 YDS
- WAS – Alfred Morris – 22 CAR, 124 YDS

**Top receivers**

- NYG – Victor Cruz – 5 REC, 104 YDS
- WAS – Pierre Garçon – 8 REC, 106 YDS, TD

**Top tacklers**

- NYG – Antrel Rolle – 5 TKL, 5 AST
- WAS – London Fletcher – 4 TKL, 8 AST; Cedric Griffin – 4 TKL, AST; Perry Riley – 4 TKL, 2 AST; Madieu Williams – 4 TKL, 3 AST; Josh Wilson – 4 TKL

Coming off a huge victory over the Packers, the Giants traveled to Washington for their only Monday Night Football appearance of the season. Although the Giants led at halftime, the Redskins scored a touchdown early in the fourth quarter to take a one-point lead. The Giants' offense failed to score any points and the Redskins held on to win 17–16. With the loss, the Giants fell to 7–5 and 2–3 within the NFC East.

==== Week 14: vs. New Orleans Saints ====
Week Fourteen: New Orleans Saints at New York Giants – Game summary

Quarter	1	2	3	4	Total
Saints	7	6	14	0	**27**
**Giants**	14	7	14	17	**52**

at MetLife Stadium, East Rutherford, New Jersey

- Date: December 9
- Game time: 4:25 pm. EST
- Game weather: 42 °F (6 °C), Rain
- Game attendance: 81,437
- Referee: Jeff Triplette
- TV announcers (Fox): Joe Buck, Troy Aikman and Pam Oliver

Game information

**First quarter**

- NO Elbert Mack 73-yard interception return (Garrett Hartley kick) (NO 7-0)
- NYG Wilson 97-yard kickoff return (Tynes kick) (0–0, 0:13) (Tied 7-7)
- NYG Bennett 6-yard pass from Manning (Tynes kick) (4–35, 2:24) (NYG 14-7)

**Second quarter**

- NO Hartley 32-yard FG (14–81, 5:44) (NYG 14-10)
- NO Hartley 25-yard FG (8–67, 4:06) (NYG 14-13)
- NYG Domenik Hixon 5-yard pass from Manning (Tynes kick) (9–69, 1:37) (NYG 21-13)

**Third quarter**

- NYG Wilson 6-yard run (Tynes kick) (4–20, 1:40) (NYG 28-13)
- NYG Nicks 25-yard pass from Manning (Tynes kick) (6–62, 3:09) (NYG 34-13)
- NO Darren Sproles 13-yard run (Hartley kick) (3–75, 0:52) (NYG 34-20)
- NO Sproles 9-yard pass from Brees (Hartley kick) (6–68, 3:09) (NYG 34-27)

**Fourth quarter**

- NYG Cruz 10-yard pass from Manning (Tynes kick) (5–25, 2:31) (NYG 41-27)
- NYG Tynes 39-yard FG (4–2, 1:31) (NYG 44-27)
- NYG Wilson 52-yard run (Tynes kick) (1–52, 0:10) (NYG 52-27)

**Top passers**

- NO – Drew Brees – 26/43, 354 YDS, TD, 2 INT
- NYG – Eli Manning – 22/35, 259 YDS, 4 TD, 2 INT

**Top rushers**

- NO – Mark Ingram II – 13 CAR, 68 YDS
- NYG – David Wilson – 13 CAR, 100 YDS, 2 TD

**Top receivers**

- NO – Joe Morgan – 2 REC, 106 YDS
- NYG – Victor Cruz – 8 REC, 121 YDS, TD

**Top tacklers**

- NO – Curtis Lofton – 7 TKL, 2 AST; Patrick Robinson – 7 TKL
- NYG – Michael Boley – 7 TKL, 3 AST; Stevie Brown – 7 TKL, AST

The Giants returned home to face Drew Brees and the New Orleans Saints, in a game that would turn out to be a breakout game for rookie David Wilson. The first-round draft pick (32nd overall) rushed for a touchdown on a kickoff return and ran for two more scores in a huge win over the Saints. The Giants won 52–27, handing the Saints their eighth loss of the season. With the win, the Giants improved to 8–5 and secured their eighth consecutive non-losing season.

==== Week 15: at Atlanta Falcons ====
Week Fifteen: New York Giants at Atlanta Falcons – Game summary

Quarter	1	2	3	4	Total
Giants	0	0	0	0	**0**
**Falcons**	14	3	10	7	**34**

at Georgia Dome, Atlanta

- Date: December 16
- Game time: 1:00 pm. EST
- Game weather: Played indoors (dome stadium)
- Game attendance: 70,741
- Referee: Bill Leavy
- TV announcers (Fox): Kenny Albert, Daryl Johnston and Tony Siragusa

Game information

**First quarter**

- ATL Turner 1-yard run (Matt Bryant kick) (4–16, 1:51) (ATL 7-0)
- ATL Tony Gonzalez 12-yard pass from Ryan (Bryant kick) (10–80, 5:42) (ATL 14-0)

**Second quarter**

- ATL Bryant 38-yard FG (4–8, 1:46) (ATL 17-0)

**Third quarter**

- ATL Julio Jones 40-yard pass from Ryan (Bryant kick) (8–80, 3:29) (ATL 24-0)
- ATL Bryant 19-yard FG (12–73, 6:43) (ATL 27-0)

**Fourth quarter**

- ATL Jones 3-yard pass from Ryan (Bryant kick) (13–69, 9:14) (ATL 34-0)

**Top passers**

- NYG – Eli Manning – 13/25, 161 YDS, 2 INT
- ATL – Matt Ryan – 23/28, 270 YDS, 3 TD

**Top rushers**

- NYG – David Wilson – 12 CAR, 55 YDS
- ATL – Michael Turner – 16 CAR, 52 YDS, TD

**Top receivers**

- NYG – Domenik Hixon – 5 REC, 80 YDS
- ATL – Harry Douglas – 3 REC, 83 YDS

**Top tacklers**

- NYG – Stevie Brown – 6 TKL, 2 AST; Will Hill – 6 TKL, 3 AST
- ATL – Sean Weatherspoon – 6 TKL, 3 AST

The Giants traveled to Atlanta to visit the Falcons in their third and final rematch of last season's playoffs. The game took place only two days after the Sandy Hook Elementary School shooting, just an hour's drive from the Giants' practice facility. The Giants honored the victims by wearing "SHES" decals on their helmets, and wide receiver Victor Cruz played in honor of six-year-old Jack Pinto, one of the victims.

The Giants ultimately lost 34–0 and fell to 8–6 overall. However, the loss did not eliminate them from either playoff contention or the NFC East title.

The embarrassing loss was one of three shutouts on the same day, the other two being the Tampa Bay Buccaneers and the Kansas City Chiefs.

==== Week 16: at Baltimore Ravens ====
Week Sixteen: New York Giants at Baltimore Ravens – Game summary

Quarter	1	2	3	4	Total
Giants	7	0	0	7	**14**
**Ravens**	14	10	3	6	**33**

at M&T Bank Stadium, Baltimore, Maryland

- Date: December 23
- Game time: 4:25 pm. EST
- Game weather: 51 °F (11 °C), Sunny
- Game attendance: 71,470
- Referee: Carl Cheffers
- TV announcers (Fox): Joe Buck, Troy Aikman and Pam Oliver

Game information

**First quarter**

- BAL Torrey Smith 6-yard pass from Flacco (Justin Tucker kick) (14–73, 5:25) (BAL 7-0)
- BAL Flacco 1-yard run (Tucker kick) (4–47, 2:10) (BAL 14-0)
- NYG Wilson 14-yard run (Tynes kick) (5–77, 2:54) (BAL 14-7)

**Second quarter**

- BAL Tucker 23-yard FG (12–83, 6:05) (BAL 17-7)
- BAL Ray Rice 27-yard pass from Flacco (Tucker kick) (7–76, 2:11) (BAL 24-7)

**Third quarter**

- BAL Tucker 21-yard FG (16–82, 7:57) (BAL 27-7)

**Fourth quarter**

- BAL Tucker 30-yard FG (13–62, 6:57) (BAL 30-7)
- BAL Tucker 29-yard FG (6–70, 2:56) (BAL 33-7)
- NYG Hixon 13-yard pass from Manning (Tynes kick) (11–80, 4:07) (BAL 33-14)

**Top passers**

- NYG – Eli Manning – 14/28, 150 YDS, TD
- BAL – Joe Flacco – 25/36, 309 YDS, 2 TD

**Top rushers**

- NYG – Ahmad Bradshaw – 9 CAR, 39 YDS
- BAL – Bernard Pierce – 14 CAR, 123 YDS

**Top receivers**

- NYG – Rueben Randle – REC, 43 YDS
- BAL – Anquan Boldin – 7 REC, 93 YDS

**Top tacklers**

- NYG – Antrel Rolle – 8 TKL, 2 AST
- BAL – Dannell Ellerbe – 5 TKL

The Giants visited Baltimore, where they were defeated by the Ravens 33–14. With the loss, the Giants fell to 8–7 and were eliminated from contention for the NFC East title. The Giants can still obtain a wild-card berth with a victory against the Eagles and Week 17 victories by the Packers, Lions and Redskins.

==== Week 17: vs. Philadelphia Eagles ====
Week Seventeen: Philadelphia Eagles at New York Giants – Game summary

Quarter	1	2	3	4	Total
Eagles	0	7	0	0	**7**
**Giants**	21	14	0	7	**42**

at MetLife Stadium, East Rutherford, New Jersey

- Date: December 30
- Game time: 1:00 pm. EST
- Game weather: 32 °F (0 °C), Windy
- Game attendance: 80,657
- Referee: Tony Corrente
- TV announcers (Fox): Thom Brennaman, Brian Billick and Laura Okmin

Game information

**First quarter**

- NYG Randle 3-yard pass from Manning (Tynes kick) (4–26, 2:01) (NYG 7-0)
- NYG Randle 38-yard pass from Manning (Tynes kick) (5–74, 2:43) (NYG 14-0)
- NYG Wilson 15-yard pass from Manning (Tynes kick) (6–75, 3:10) (NYG 21-0)

**Second quarter**

- PHI Jeremy Maclin 7-yard pass from Vick (Henery kick) (11–80, 4:12) (NYG 21-7)
- NYG Bradshaw 1-yard run (Tynes kick) (10–73, 5:40) (NYG 28-7)
- NYG Cruz 24-yard pass from Manning (Tynes kick) (2–54, 0:13) (NYG 35-7)

**Fourth quarter**

- NYG Henry Hynoski 1-yard pass from Manning (Tynes kick) (14–88, 9:24) (NYG 42-7)

**Top passers**

- PHI – Michael Vick – 19/35, 197 YDS, TD, INT
- NYG – Eli Manning – 13/21, 208 YDS, 5 TD

**Top rushers**

- PHI – LeSean McCoy – 10 CAR, 45 YDS
- NYG – Ahmad Bradshaw – 16 CAR, 107 YDS, TD

**Top receivers**

- PHI – LeSean McCoy – 5 REC, 61 YDS
- NYG – Rueben Randle – 4 REC, 58 YDS, 2 TD

**Top tacklers**

- PHI – Colt Anderson – 9 TKL, AST
- NYG – Chase Blackburn – 6 TKL, AST; Stevie Brown – 6 TKL

The Giants would have a lopsided victory 42–7 against the Eagles. However, the Giants would be eliminated from playoff contention with a Bears' victory that same day.

== Standings ==
NFC East
	W	L	T	PCT	DIV	CONF	PF	PA	STK
^{(4)} Washington Redskins	10	6	0	.625	5–1	8–4	436	388	W7
New York Giants	9	7	0	.563	3–3	8–4	429	344	W1
Dallas Cowboys	8	8	0	.500	3–3	5–7	376	400	L2
Philadelphia Eagles	4	12	0	.250	1–5	2–10	280	444	L3

== Statistics ==
=== Team leaders ===
	Player(s)	Value
Passing yards	Eli Manning	3948 Yards
Passing touchdowns	Eli Manning	26 TDs
Rushing yards	Ahmad Bradshaw	1015 Yards
Rushing touchdowns	Andre Brown	8 TDs
Receiving yards	Victor Cruz	1092 Yards
Receiving touchdowns	Victor Cruz	10 TDs
Points	Lawrence Tynes	145 Points
Kickoff Return Yards	David Wilson	1533 Yards
Punt return Yards	Rueben Randle	108 Yards
Tackles	Chase Blackburn	98 Tackles
Sacks	Jason Pierre-Paul	6.5 Sacks
Interceptions	Stevie Brown	8 INTs

stats values are correct.

=== League rankings ===
- Total Offense (YPG): 371.2 (10th)
- Passing (YPG): 256 (9th)
- Rushing (YPG): 114.8 (15th)
- Total Defense (YPG): 366.9 (22nd)
- Passing (YPG): 245 (22nd)
- Rushing (YPG): 121.8 (21st)

Stats correct through week 14.
