= Rocky Bernard =

American football player (born 1979)

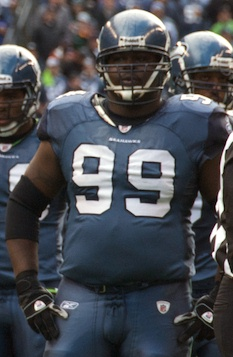
- Bernard with the Seattle Seahawks in 2008

No. 99, 95
- Position: Defensive tackle

Personal information
- Born: April 19, 1979 (age 47); Baytown, Texas, U.S.
- Listed height: 6 ft 3 in (1.91 m)
- Listed weight: 301 lb (137 kg)

Career information
- High school: Sterling (Baytown)
- College: Texas A&M
- NFL draft: 2002: 5th round, 146th overall pick

Career history
- Seattle Seahawks (2002–2008); New York Giants (2009–2012)

Awards and highlights
- Super Bowl champion (XLVI)

Career NFL statistics
- Total tackles: 383
- Sacks: 33.0
- Forced fumbles: 5
- Fumble recoveries: 8
- Pass deflections: 20
- Stats at Pro Football Reference

Robert "Rocky" Eugene Bernard Jr. (born April 19, 1979) is an American former professional football player who was a defensive tackle in the National Football League (NFL). He was selected by the Seattle Seahawks in the fifth round of the 2002 NFL draft. He played college football for the Texas A&M Aggies.

== Professional career ==
=== Seattle Seahawks ===
Bernard was selected by the Seahawks in the fifth round of the 2002 NFL draft with the 146th overall pick. Bernard was mostly used as a backup in his first three seasons in the league before becoming the starting right defensive tackle in 2005, earning 8.5 sacks with two more in the NFC Championship Game against the Carolina Panthers. Bernard amassed a total of forty-two tackles in the 2005 season.

On August 30, 2008, the National Football League suspended Bernard for the Seahawks' 2008 season opener for violating the league's personal conduct policy. Bernard was arrested in April on investigation of domestic violence. He allegedly punched his ex-girlfriend in the forehead. He lost $235,000 in salary for the suspension.

=== New York Giants ===
On February 28, 2009, Bernard signed a four-year, $16 million contract with the New York Giants. The deal contains $6.9 million guaranteed, including a $5 million signing bonus and his first-year base salary.

Bernard was released on July 28, 2011. He was re-signed by the Giants on August 4. He earned a Super Bowl ring when the Giants defeated the New England Patriots in Super Bowl XLVI. Following the season, he became an unrestricted free agent.

== NFL career statistics ==
Legend
**Bold**	Career high

=== Regular season ===
Year	Team	Games		Tackles					Interceptions					Fumbles			
Year	Team	GP	GS	Cmb	Solo	Ast	Sck	TFL	Int	Yds	TD	Lng	PD	FF	FR	Yds	TD
2002	SEA	**16**	2	49	34	**15**	4.0	6	0	0	0	0	1	1	0	0	0
2003	SEA	12	0	16	11	5	2.0	4	0	0	0	0	1	0	0	0	0
2004	SEA	14	1	39	26	13	3.5	5	0	0	0	0	**6**	0	1	0	0
2005	SEA	**16**	7	52	**43**	9	**8.5**	**16**	0	0	0	0	3	0	**2**	**5**	0
2006	SEA	**16**	**15**	37	25	12	3.5	8	0	0	0	0	1	**2**	1	0	0
2007	SEA	14	14	35	25	10	3.5	6	0	0	0	0	0	0	**2**	0	0
2008	SEA	15	**15**	**55**	**43**	12	4.0	8	0	0	0	0	1	1	1	0	0
2009	NYG	15	0	22	16	6	1.0	3	0	0	0	0	0	0	0	0	0
2010	NYG	14	0	18	16	2	2.0	3	0	0	0	0	4	0	0	0	0
2011	NYG	**16**	1	30	15	**15**	0.0	0	0	0	0	0	3	1	1	0	0
2012	NYG	12	5	30	16	14	1.0	2	0	0	0	0	0	0	0	0	0
		160	60	383	270	113	33.0	61	0	0	0	0	20	5	8	5	0

=== Playoffs ===
Year	Team	Games		Tackles					Interceptions					Fumbles			
Year	Team	GP	GS	Cmb	Solo	Ast	Sck	TFL	Int	Yds	TD	Lng	PD	FF	FR	Yds	TD
2004	SEA	1	1	6	3	**3**	1.0	1	0	0	0	0	0	0	0	0	0
2005	SEA	3	**3**	7	6	1	**2.0**	**2**	0	0	0	0	**1**	0	0	0	0
2006	SEA	2	2	**9**	**8**	1	1.0	1	0	0	0	0	**1**	0	0	0	0
2007	SEA	2	2	3	3	0	0.0	0	0	0	0	0	0	0	0	0	0
2011	NYG	**4**	0	8	6	2	1.0	1	0	0	0	0	**1**	0	0	0	0
		12	8	33	26	7	5.0	5	0	0	0	0	3	0	0	0	0
