= Bear Pascoe =

American football player (born 1986)

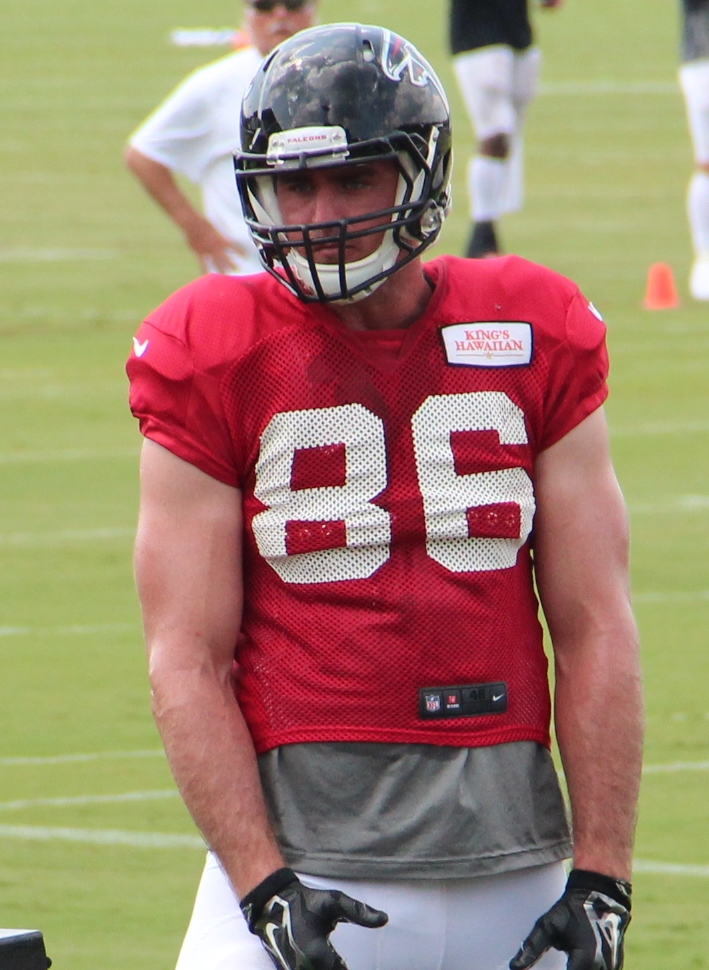
- Pascoe with the Atlanta Falcons in 2014

No. 86, 80
- Position: Tight end

Personal information
- Born: February 23, 1986 (age 40); Porterville, California, U.S.
- Listed height: 6 ft 5 in (1.96 m)
- Listed weight: 265 lb (120 kg)

Career information
- High school: Granite Hills (Porterville)
- College: Fresno State (2004–2008)
- NFL draft: 2009: 6th round, 184th overall pick

Career history
- San Francisco 49ers (2009)*; New York Giants (2009−2013); Atlanta Falcons (2014); Chicago Bears (2015)*; Detroit Lions (2015); New England Patriots (2016)*
- * Offseason or practice squad member only

Awards and highlights
- Super Bowl champion (XLVI); 2× All-WAC (2007, 2008)

Career NFL statistics
- Receptions: 40
- Receiving yards: 336
- Receiving touchdowns: 2
- Stats at Pro Football Reference

McKenna Sean "Bear" Pascoe (born February 23, 1986) is an American former professional football player who was a tight end in the National Football League (NFL). He played college football for the Fresno State Bulldogs and was selected by the San Francisco 49ers in the sixth round of the 2009 NFL draft.

== Early life ==
Born and raised in Porterville, California, Pascoe is the son of Sean and Julie Pascoe. He is an accomplished team roper, which he learned to do on his family's ranch. He attended Ducor Union Elementary school. With recognized athletic ability, he played quarterback at Granite Hills High School. He ranked as offensive player of the year for the East Yosemite League and was also named to the All-Area team.

He was recruited by Fresno State coming out of high school. His younger cousin is Vince Pascoe, who also played tight end for Fresno State.

== College career ==
As a tight end at California State University, Fresno, Pascoe tied the record for most touchdown receptions in a game, with three against Texas A&M in 2007. He also holds the school record for most field goal blocks in a career, with six.

== Professional career ==
=== New York Giants ===
On December 4, 2009, Pascoe was promoted to the Giants' active roster. He made his first career catch against the Washington Redskins for nine yards in Week 15 of the 2009 NFL season.

Pascoe was waived by New York during final cuts on September 4, 2010. The following day, the Giants re-signed Pascoe to the team's practice squad. On September 14, Pascoe was signed from the practice squad to the active roster after Kevin Boss suffered a concussion during the regular season opener against the Carolina Panthers.

Pascoe caught his first career touchdown in the 2011 season's NFC Championship Game against the San Francisco 49ers who selected him and released him. Rich Eisen later referenced to the play by comparing Pascoe with Rob Gronkowski. The Giants went on to win that game and advance to face the New England Patriots in Super Bowl XLVI. Jake Ballard was sidelined in the Super Bowl XLVI after he tore his anterior cruciate ligament in the fourth quarter, but Pascoe, mostly used as a blocking tight end, caught four passes for 33 yards, helping the Giants defeat the Patriots, 21–17.

=== Atlanta Falcons ===
After joining the Atlanta Falcons for a voluntary workout at the end of April 2014, Pascoe officially signed with them on May 1, 2014.

=== Chicago Bears ===
On April 23, 2015, Pascoe signed a one-year deal with the Chicago Bears. On September 5, he was released by the Bears.

=== Detroit Lions ===
Pascoe signed with the Detroit Lions on December 15, 2015.

=== New England Patriots ===
On July 27, 2016, Pascoe was signed by the New England Patriots. On August 22, Pascoe was released by the Patriots.

=== NFL statistics ===
		Receiving							Fumbles	
Year	Team	G	GS	Rec	Yds	Avg	Lng	TD	FUM	Lost
2009	NYG	4	1	1	9	9.0	9	0	-	-
2010	NYG	15	11	9	72	8.0	12	0	-	-
2011	NYG	16	11	12	136	11.3	22	0	-	-
2012	NYG	15	3	4	35	8.8	16	1	-	-
2013	NYG	16	6	12	81	6.8	14	0	-	-
2014	ATL	16	2	2	3	1.5	2	1	-	-
Total		82	34	40	336	8.4	22	2	0	0

== Personal life ==
Pascoe married Katie Jones, daughter of World Champion Steer Wrestler John W. Jones Jr., in 2012.

On May 10, 2025, Bear and his brother Ryan won the team roping competition at the annual San Luis Obispo Sheriff’s Rodeo in Paso Robles.
