= Alex Henery =

American football player (born 1987)

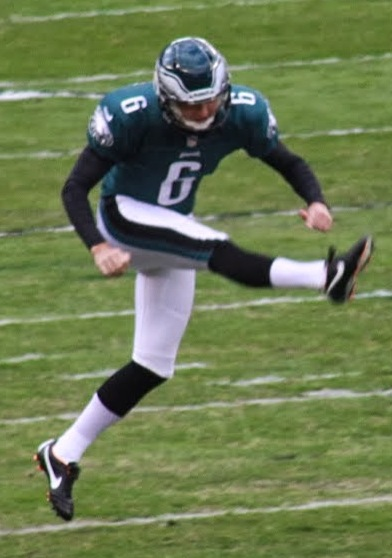
- Henery with the Philadelphia Eagles in 2013

No. 6, 5
- Position: Placekicker

Personal information
- Born: August 18, 1987 (age 39); Omaha, Nebraska, U.S
- Listed height: 6 ft 1 in (1.85 m)
- Listed weight: 177 lb (80 kg)

Career information
- High school: Burke (Omaha)
- College: Nebraska (2006–2010)
- NFL draft: 2011: 4th round, 120th overall pick

Career history
- Philadelphia Eagles (2011–2013); Detroit Lions (2014)

Awards and highlights
- Vlade Award (2010); First-team All-American (2010); First-team All-Big 12 (2010); Second-team All-Big 12 (2009); Guy Chamberlin Trophy (2010)

Career NFL statistics
- Field goals made: 75
- Field goals attempted: 91
- Field goal %: 82.4
- Longest field goal: 51
- Stats at Pro Football Reference

Alex Henery (born August 18, 1987) is an American former professional football player who was a kicker in the National Football League (NFL). He played college football for the Nebraska Cornhuskers, and set an NCAA record for field goal accuracy with an 89.5% success rate. He was selected by the Philadelphia Eagles in the fourth round of the 2011 NFL draft.

== Early life ==
Henery was born in Omaha, Nebraska. He attended Omaha Burke High School and was one of the top walk-ons in Nebraska's 2006 class. He earned Omaha World-Herald first-team All-Nebraska and first-team Lincoln Journal Star Super-State honors as a punter. Henery averaged 41.4 yards per punt as a senior, and also connected on 6-of-10 field goals and 37-of-38 extra-point tries.

Henery contributed to Omaha Burke High School having a 7–5 finish and earning a trip to the state semifinals. He earned first-team all-state honors as a junior, averaging 41.7 yards per punt. He also played soccer and led Burke to a 14–3 record and the state playoffs. He received a scholarship offer to play soccer for Creighton University.

== College career ==
Henery attended the University of Nebraska–Lincoln, and played for the Nebraska Cornhuskers football team from 2007 to 2010. For most of his college career, he served as the punter and placekicker for the Cornhuskers, and received all-conference honors at both positions. He was a second-team All-Big 12 selection at placekicker in 2009 and 2010, and was previously an honorable mention selection in 2008; at punter, he was a second-team All-Big 12 selection in 2010, and received honorable mention honors in 2009. On November 28, 2008, he set a Nebraska team record when he kicked a 57-yard field goal in a 40–31 victory over the Colorado Buffaloes. During his four seasons as a Cornhusker, he set an NCAA career record by completing 89.5 percent of his attempted field goals. His total accuracy on combined field goals and extra points also set a new NCAA record of 96.7 percent. He is the all-time leading scorer in Nebraska history with 397 points.

== Professional career ==
Pre-draft measurables
| Height | Weight | Arm length | Hand span | Wingspan |
|---|---|---|---|---|
| 6 ft 1 1/2 in (1.87 m) | 177 lb (80 kg) | 30 1/2 in (0.77 m) | 8 3/4 in (0.22 m) | 6 ft 1 3/8 in (1.86 m) |
All values from the NFL Combine

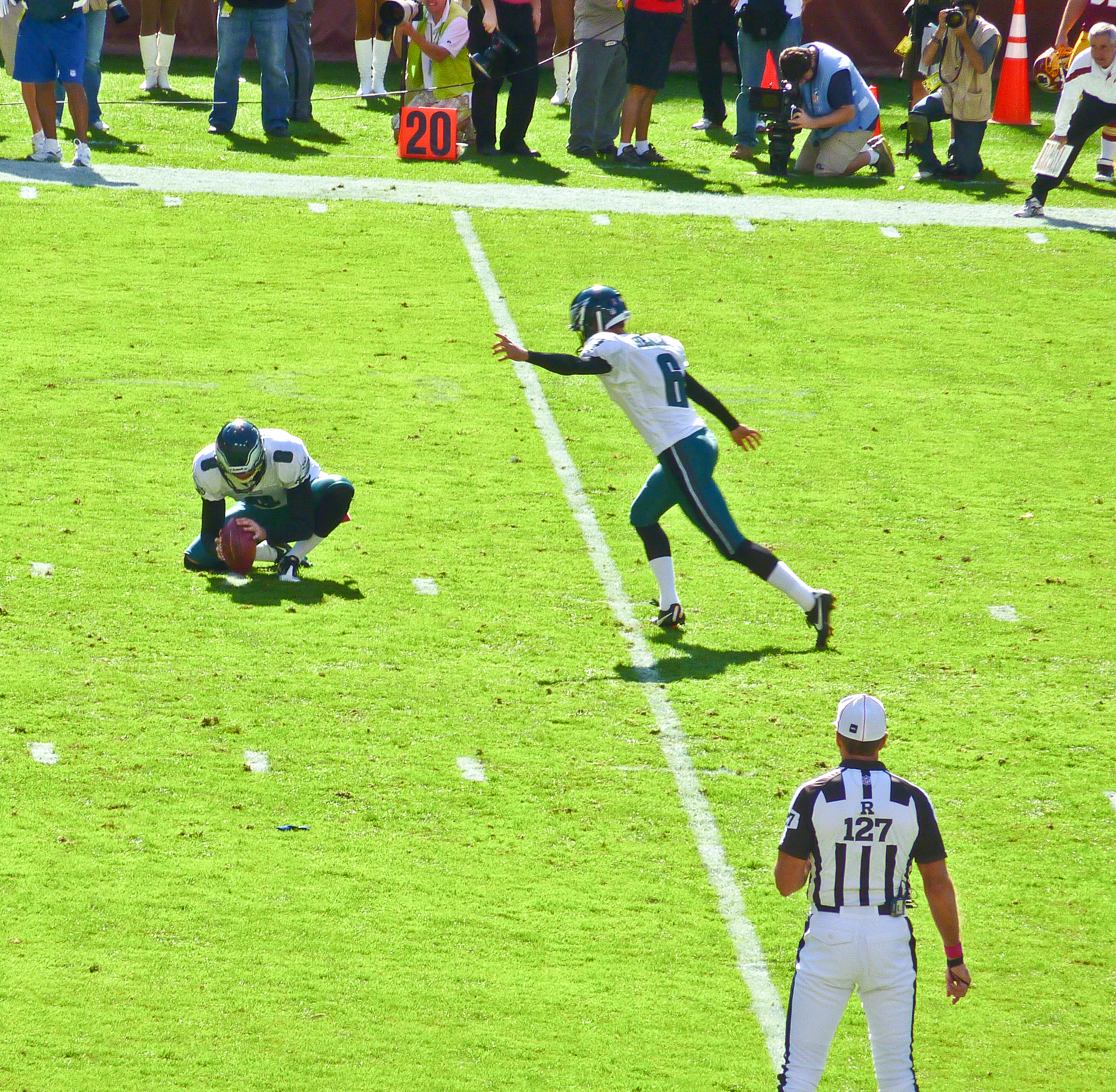
Henery (right) with the Philadelphia Eagles in 2011

=== Philadelphia Eagles ===
The Philadelphia Eagles chose Henery in the fourth round of the 2011 NFL draft with the 120th overall pick. He began the 2011 season as the Eagles' starting placekicker, and set a new NFL record for field goal accuracy by a rookie kicker. In Week 16, he kicked a career-best 51-yard field goal in a 20−7 win over the Dallas Cowboys at Cowboys Stadium.

In his second year with the Eagles, he set a franchise record by making 18 consecutive field goals, and went on to extend the record to 22 (then-longest active streak in the league), before just missing a 58-yard field goal in Week 14 against Tampa Bay.

On August 30, 2014, Henery lost the starting placekicker position to Cody Parkey and was released by the Eagles.

=== Detroit Lions ===
On September 22, 2014, the Detroit Lions signed Henery to replace struggling rookie Nate Freese. On October 6, a day after missing three field goals in the Lions' week five loss to the Buffalo Bills, including a potential game-winner late in the final minute, he was released by the team.

== Post-career ==
Having retired from football, he currently works for Tetrad Property Group, a real estate company. Henery also occasionally instructs at summer kicking camps and gives private lessons.

== Personal life ==
Henery is the son of Guy (computer business) and Mary Henery (a medical technologist at Creighton University). He has an older brother named Eric and a younger sister named Andrea. In 2011, he married his longtime girlfriend Johna. He has a son named Landen.
