= Jacquian Williams =

American football player (born 1989)

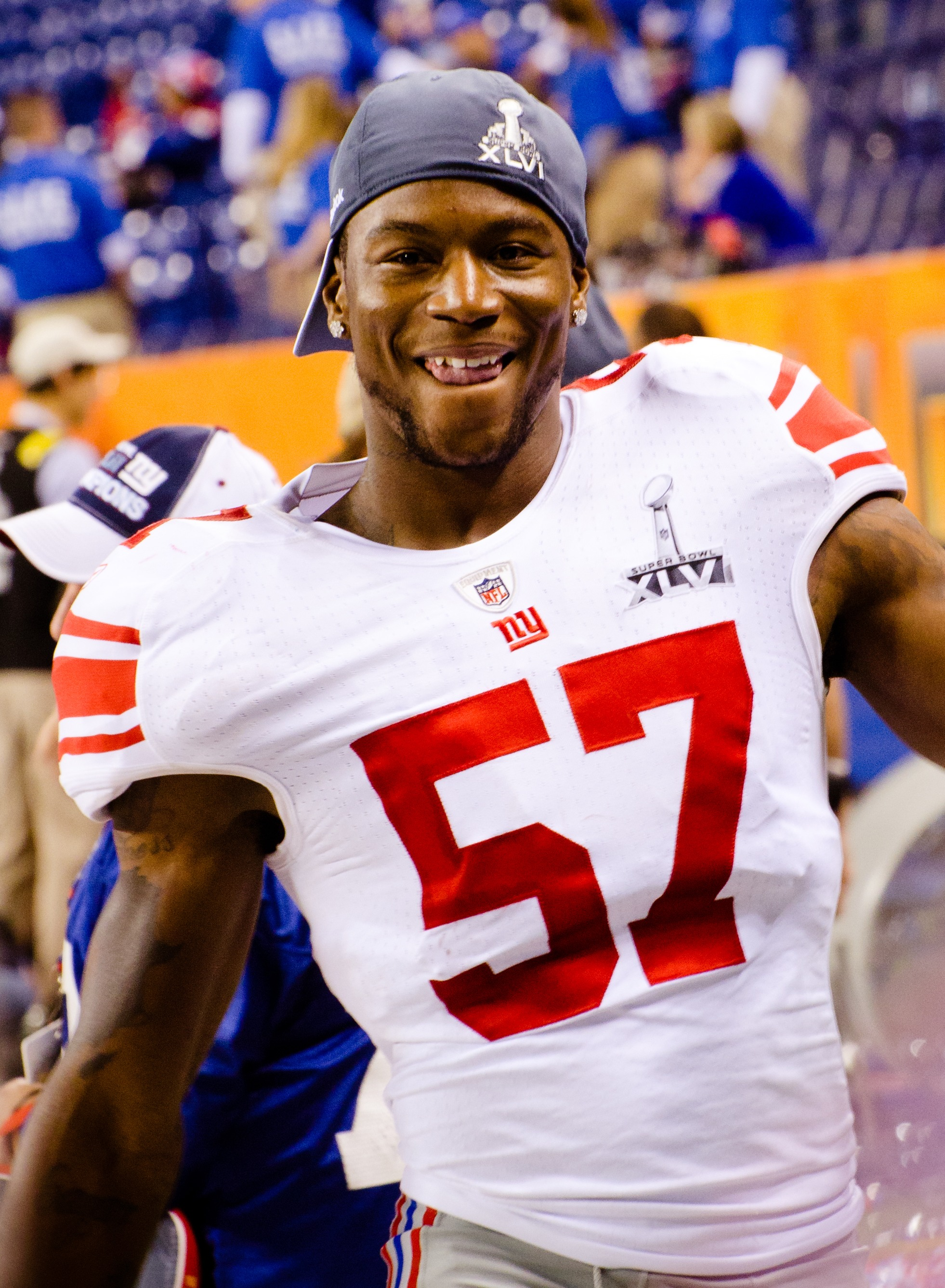
- Williams after winning Super Bowl XLVI

No. 57
- Position: Linebacker

Personal information
- Born: July 20, 1988 (age 38); Tampa, Florida, U.S.
- Listed height: 6 ft 3 in (1.91 m)
- Listed weight: 231 lb (105 kg)

Career information
- High school: Riverview (Riverview, Florida)
- College: South Florida
- NFL draft: 2011: 6th round, 202nd overall pick

Career history
- New York Giants (2011–2014)

Awards and highlights
- Super Bowl champion (XLVI); Second-team All-Big East (2010); 2× All-KJCCC (2007–2008)

Career NFL statistics
- Total tackles: 242
- Sacks: 2
- Forced fumbles: 1
- Fumble recoveries: 5
- Stats at Pro Football Reference

Jacquian Williams (born July 20, 1988) is an American former professional football player who was a linebacker in the National Football League (NFL). He played college football for the South Florida Bulls. and was selected by the New York Giants in the sixth round of the 2011 NFL draft.

== College career ==
=== Fort Scott ===
Williams began his collegiate career at Fort Scott Community College in Fort Scott, Kansas, where he spent his freshman and sophomore seasons. In 2007, as a freshman, he recorded 11 tackles for a loss and 60 tackles in total. The following season, he recorded a total of 72 tackles, 12 for a loss, one interception and a forced fumble. After the season, he was named a National Junior College Athletic Association First–team All-American. He was named an All–Kansas Jayhawk Community College Conference selection in both of his seasons at Fort Scott.

=== Recruitment ===
Following his junior college career, Rivals.com considered Williams to be a four-star recruit. During his recruitment process, he received scholarship offers from the University of South Florida, University of Nebraska–Lincoln, University of Alabama at Birmingham, University of Central Florida, and Kansas State University, as well as receiving interest from Oklahoma State University. However, on January 21, 2009, Williams committed to South Florida. Jason Pierre-Paul, Williams's teammate in 2008 in Fort Scott, also signed with South Florida.

College recruiting
Name	Hometown	School	Height	Weight	40^{‡}	Commit date
Jacquian Williams; LB	Riverview, Florida	Fort Scott Community College (KS)	6 ft 4 in (1.93 m)	230 lb (100 kg)	4.5	Jan 21, 2009
Jacquian Williams; LB	Recruit ratings: Scout: Rivals:					
Overall recruit ranking:
Note: In many cases, Scout, Rivals, 247Sports, On3, and ESPN may conflict in their listings of height and weight.; In these cases, the average was taken. ESPN grades are on a 100-point scale.; Sources: "2009 Team Ranking". Rivals.com.

=== South Florida ===
In his first season for South Florida, Williams spent time at both linebacker and on special teams, appearing in all 13 games. He recorded 28 tackles and one tackle for a loss. He made one start for the Bulls, against the Connecticut Huskies, tallying five tackles and a tackle for a loss. During the 2010 International Bowl against Northern Illinois, Williams made four tackles, helping South Florida win 27–3 in the final edition of the game.

The following year, his senior season, Williams was named a team captain for the Bulls as well as a starter at outside linebacker, starting every game for the team. He led the team with 71 tackles and also recorded 11 tackles for a loss, one interception, and 2.5 sacks. Against Rutgers, he recorded a career-high 11 tackles and also recorded seven tackles against both Miami and Connecticut. Williams finished his career at South Florida with three tackles in the 2010 Meineke Car Care Bowl, which South Florida won 31–26 over the Clemson Tigers. He was named second–team All–Big East after the season.

Williams finished his career at South Florida with 231 tackles, eight sacks, 35 tackles for a loss, three forced fumbles, two fumble recoveries, and three interceptions.

== Professional career ==
Pre-draft measurables
Height	Weight	40-yard dash	10-yard split	20-yard split	20-yard shuttle	Three-cone drill	Vertical jump	Broad jump	Bench press
6 ft 2 5/8 in (1.90 m)	231 lb (105 kg)	4.55 s	1.57 s	2.64 s	4.20 s	6.90 s	36.5 in (0.93 m)	9 ft 8 in (2.95 m)	17 reps
All values from Pro Day

Williams appeared in the ESPN documentary "The Dotted Line", filmed in the months leading up to the 2011 NFL draft. The program depicted the relationship between Williams and his first agent, Eugene Lee of ETL Associates, as well as Williams's decision to dump ETL after the draft.

Williams was selected in the sixth round with the 202nd overall pick by the New York Giants in the 2011 NFL draft, once again re-uniting him with Jason Pierre-Paul, his teammate at Fort Scott Community College and the University of South Florida. According to Ohm Youngmisuk of ESPN, "Williams caught the Giants' attention with his athleticism, speed and untapped potential." On July 29, Williams signed his rookie contract with the Giants. During training camp, Williams has mainly seen time with third–team defense. In his rookie season, Williams had 78 tackles. He played in all 16 games and made 2 starts.

During the NFC Championship game on January 22, 2012 between the Giants and the San Francisco 49ers, Williams stripped 49ers punt returner Kyle Williams during a punt return and the Giants recovered it in field goal range, which led to the game-winning field goal by Lawrence Tynes and put the Giants in Super Bowl XLVI, their second Super Bowl in four years.

== NFL career statistics ==
Legend
**Bold**	Career high

=== Regular season ===
Year	Team	Games		Tackles					Interceptions					Fumbles			
Year	Team	GP	GS	Cmb	Solo	Ast	Sck	TFL	Int	Yds	TD	Lng	PD	FF	FR	Yds	TD
2011	NYG	**16**	2	**78**	**58**	20	**1.0**	2	0	0	0	0	4	**1**	**3**	0	0
2012	NYG	10	3	30	21	9	**1.0**	1	0	0	0	0	2	0	0	0	0
2013	NYG	**16**	8	58	39	19	0.0	**5**	0	0	0	0	**8**	0	2	**5**	0
2014	NYG	9	**9**	76	55	**21**	0.0	1	0	0	0	0	3	0	0	0	0
		51	22	242	173	69	2.0	9	0	0	0	0	17	1	5	5	0

=== Playoffs ===
Year	Team	Games		Tackles					Interceptions					Fumbles			
Year	Team	GP	GS	Cmb	Solo	Ast	Sck	TFL	Int	Yds	TD	Lng	PD	FF	FR	Yds	TD
2011	NYG	**4**	0	**15**	**14**	**1**	0.0	0	0	0	0	0	**2**	**1**	0	0	0
		4	0	15	14	1	0.0	0	0	0	0	0	2	1	0	0	0
