= Riverview High School (Riverview, Florida) =

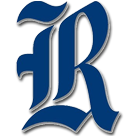

Location
- 11311 Boyette Road; Riverview, Florida 33569; United States; 27°51′06″N 82°18′43″W

Information
- Type: Public high school
- Established: 1998
- School district: Hillsborough County Public Schools
- Principal: Brian Spiro
- Staff: 112.00 (FTE)
- Grades: 9–12
- Enrollment: 2,496 (2023–2024)
- Student to teacher ratio: 22.29
- Color
- Mascot: Shark
- Team name: Sharks
- Newspaper: Riverview High Shark TV
- Website: www.hillsboroughschools.org/o/riverviewhs

Riverview High School is a public high school in Riverview, Florida, United States. It is operated as part of the Hillsborough County Public Schools district.

== History ==
In February 1996, the Hillsborough County School Board purchased two forty-acre plots from two different owners for a total of $2,050,000 on the southeast corner of Boyette Road and Balm Riverview Road, in Riverview, Florida, to be the location of a high school. Ground was broken in January 1997 and construction began in preparation for opening of school in August 1998.

On January 20, 1998, Riverview High School's first principal, J. Vince Thompson, was appointed. Mr. Thompson held meetings during the month of February 1998 with students from East Bay High School, Brandon High School, Bloomingdale High School, Progress Village Middle School, Burns Middle School, and McLane Middle School to discuss the implementation of block scheduling and the selection of a school mascot and school colors; block scheduling was approved, the colors of black, royal blue, and silver were selected as school colors, and the Sharks picked as the school mascot. On March 17, 1998, the School Board approved the mascot and the colors.

== Notable alumni ==
- Jahleel Addae (2008): NFL football player
- Jahmile Addae (2005): NFL football player
- Andrew Barbosa: professional baseball pitcher
- Orson Charles: American football tight end and fullback played at Riverview before transferring to Plant
- Jason Harmon (2004): professional football player
- Jordan Leasure (2016): MLB pitcher
- Tyrone McKenzie (2004): NFL football player
- Roderick Strong: born Christopher Lindsey, wrestler
- Freddy Tarnok (2017): MLB pitcher
- Jacquian Williams (2006): NFL football player
