= 2011 New York Giants season =

87th season in franchise history; fourth Super Bowl win

- Owner: John Mara; Steve Tisch
- General manager: Jerry Reese
- Head coach: Tom Coughlin
- Offensive coordinator: Kevin Gilbride
- Defensive coordinator: Perry Fewell
- Home stadium: MetLife Stadium

Results
- Record: 9–7
- Division place: 1st NFC East
- Playoffs: Won Wild Card Playoffs (vs. Falcons) 24–2; Won Divisional Playoffs (at Packers) 37–20; Won NFC Championship (at 49ers) 20–17 (OT); Won Super Bowl XLVI (vs. Patriots) 21–17
- All-Pros: DE Jason Pierre-Paul (1st team); WR Victor Cruz (2nd team)
- Pro Bowlers: Selected but did not participate due to participation in Super Bowl XLVI: QB Eli Manning; DE Jason Pierre-Paul

Uniform
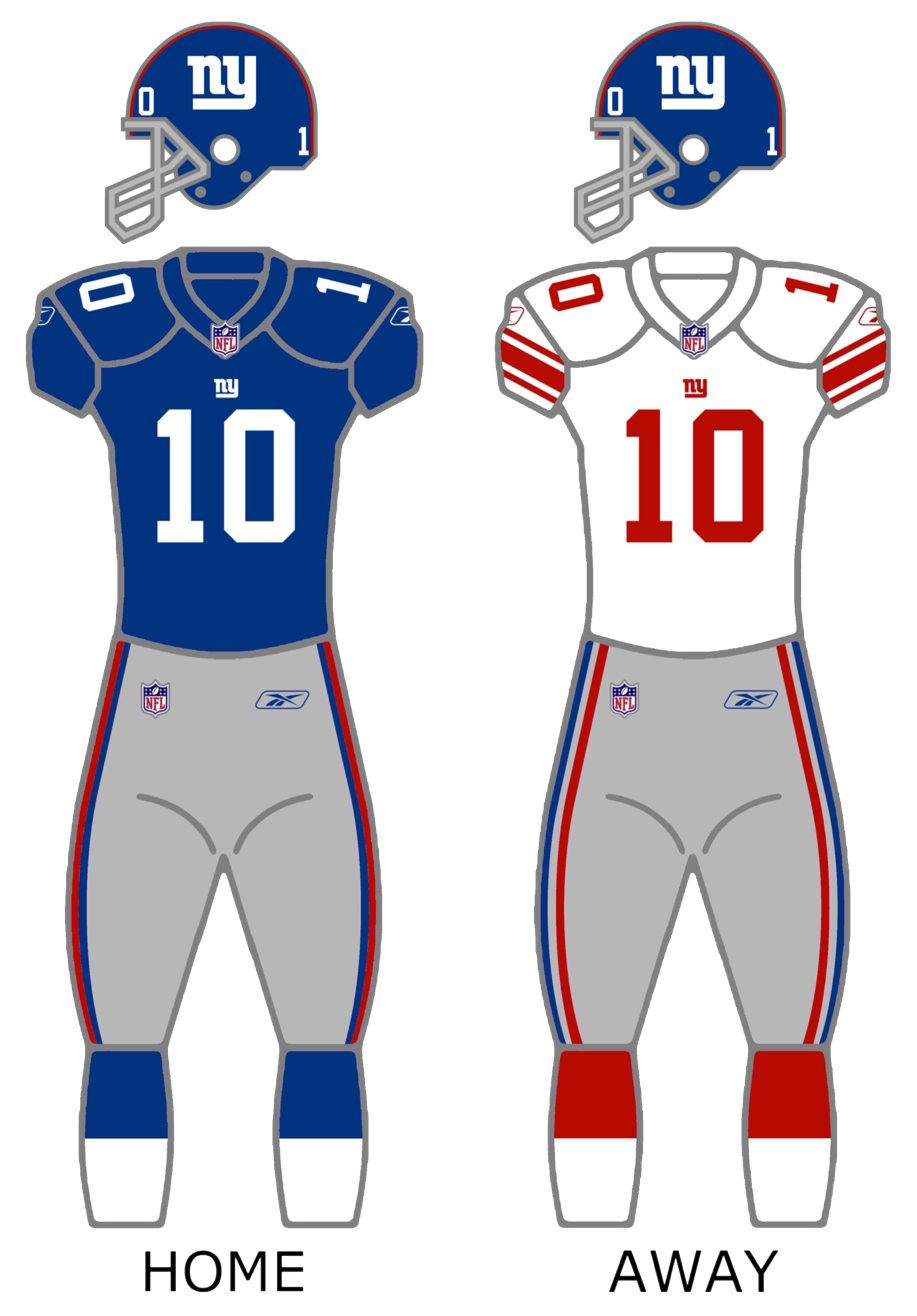

The 2011 season was the New York Giants' 87th in the National Football League (NFL) and their eighth under head coach Tom Coughlin. They played all of their home games at MetLife Stadium in East Rutherford, New Jersey. Although the team failed to improve on their 10–6 mark from 2010, the Giants were able to qualify for the playoffs, and in another Cinderella run that paralleled what they did in 2007, they won Super Bowl XLVI, again versus the New England Patriots, their fourth Super Bowl win in franchise history.

Many analysts predicted a rough year for the Giants. Despite highs and lows throughout the season, the Giants, with a 9–7 record, returned to the NFL playoffs for the first time since 2008, winning the NFC East and finished the season as the NFC's #4 seed. New York finished 10–6 in 2010 but failed to qualify for the playoffs due to not having any tiebreakers over any NFC playoff team. The Giants entered their week 17 match up with the Cowboys with both teams tied for the division lead with 8–7 records. The Giants took a 21–0 first half lead and while the Cowboys closed the gap to make the score 21–14 early in the 4th quarter, the Giants held on to defeat the Cowboys 31–14, clinching the divisional title and a playoff berth.

In the playoffs, the Giants defeated the Atlanta Falcons, top-seeded 15–1 Green Bay Packers, and the San Francisco 49ers to win the NFC championship. The Giants defeated the New England Patriots in Super Bowl XLVI, which was a rematch of Super Bowl XLII from 4 years earlier in which the Giants defeated the previously undefeated Patriots. As in 2007, 1990, and 1986, the Giants played their eventual Super Bowl opponent during the regular season. The Giants also played the Packers and 49ers during the season, losing both games in the final minutes of play.

The 2011 Giants were the first team in NFL history to reach the Super Bowl with a negative regular season point differential (-6, 394 points scored, 400 points allowed). With a 9–7 record, the Giants became the third NFL team to win fewer than 10 games in a 16-game season and reach the Super Bowl, but became the first of the three to win the Super Bowl. The previous teams to go 9–7 and reach the Super Bowl (the 1979 Rams, who only needed two playoff wins were the first, and the 2008 Arizona Cardinals) were both defeated by the Pittsburgh Steelers. Additionally, upon defeating the Patriots in Super Bowl XLVI the Giants became the first NFC East champion to win the Super Bowl since the Dallas Cowboys in 1995 (the Giants were a Wild Card team as the #5 seed when they won Super Bowl XLII).

The 2011 Giants were an aberration from other great Giants teams of the past who were built around tough, physical defensive play and an offense built around a power running attack. Despite Jason Pierre-Paul having a breakout Pro Bowl season with 16.5 sacks, the defense was ranked in the bottom 10 in points and yards allowed and was top 10 in penalties. Their normally durable rushing attack of Brandon Jacobs and Ahmad Bradshaw was ranked last in the NFL with 89 rushing yards per game as a team. The standout of the year was the quarterback play of Eli Manning who threw a career-high and franchise record 4,933 passing yards with 29 touchdown passes. Manning engineered 6 regular season game-winning drives in 2011 and threw 15 touchdown passes in the 4th quarter, NFL records that still stand. He improved upon his interception total, lowering it to 16. He had 2 more game-winning drives in the playoffs, the NFC Championship and Super Bowl XLVI. Manning's 5 career game-winning drives in the playoffs are tied for third in NFL history with Joe Montana and became the fifth player to win multiple Super Bowl MVP awards. Manning's play subsequently led to the breakout of undrafted wide receiver Victor Cruz and the emergence of Cruz and Hakeem Nicks as the best wide receiver duo in the NFL. Cruz set a franchise record 1,536 receiving yards from 82 receptions, while Nicks had 76 receptions for 1,192 yards.

Some news organizations, among them The St. Louis Post-Dispatch, said that the Giants' victory in the Super Bowl made them the NFL's version of the 2011 World Series champion St. Louis Cardinals, saying that these two championship teams had been given the last rites by many near the end of the season, but emerged as champions at the end. The 2012 Stanley Cup champion Los Angeles Kings also followed a similar path to the Cardinals and Giants a few months later, qualifying for the final playoff spot in the Western Conference in their penultimate regular season game only to dominate in the playoffs, just losing a record-tying low of four playoff games, en route to the franchise's first championship.

This season was the final time the Giants qualified for the playoffs under Coughlin, and would not reach the playoffs again until 2016 and would not win a playoff game again until 2022. As of 2025, this is the most recent time the Giants have won the NFC East, as they currently hold the longest active division title drought in the conference, at 14 seasons.

== Offseason ==
=== Draft class ===
Todd McShay (ESPN), Steve Wyche (NFL.com), Pat Kirwan of NFL.com, New Era Scouting, and DraftKing.com predicted that the Giants would use their first-round pick (19th overall) to draft Gabe Carimi (who went 29th overall), a left tackle for the Wisconsin Badgers who won the 2010 Outland Trophy as the nation's top collegiate interior lineman, and was a Consensus All-American. Charles Davis of NFL.com predicted that they would draft Mike Pouncey (who went 15th overall), a center/offensive guard from the University of Florida. They instead drafted Prince Amukamara, an all-American cornerback from the University of Nebraska.

Round	Selection	Player	Position	College
1	19	Prince Amukamara	CB	Nebraska
2	52	Marvin Austin	DT	North Carolina
3	83	Jerrel Jernigan	WR	Troy
4	117	James Brewer	OT	Indiana
5	^{[a]}			
6	185	Greg Jones	LB	Michigan State
6	198 ^{[b]}	Tyler Sash	S	Iowa
6	202 ^{[b]}	Jacquian Williams	LB	South Florida
7	221	Da'Rel Scott	RB	Maryland

^{^[a]} The Giants traded its fifth-round selection (#150 overall) and a 2012 conditional draft selection to the Minnesota Vikings in exchange for RB Darius Reynaud and QB Sage Rosenfels.
^{^[b]} Compensatory selection.

== Players ==
=== Movement ===
In the first week of the offseason the Giants signed some road free agents and former members of their 2010 practice squad to reserve/future contracts in order to bolster the roster for the 2011 season. In early March the team signed potential free agents to contract extensions: on March 2 the team signed running back D.J. Ware to a two-year extension and on March 3 they signed wide receivers Domenik Hixon and Darius Reynaud to one and two-year extensions, respectively. They also offered tenders to some of their restricted free agents but the effectiveness of these tenders rely on the ongoing CBA talks.

=== Free agents ===
Position	Player	Free agency tag	Date signed/released	2011 team
LB	Chase Blackburn	UFA	November 29, 2011	New York Giants
CB	Will Blackmon	Released	January 2, 2011	New York Giants
OT	Kevin Boothe	UFA		New York Giants
TE	Kevin Boss	UFA	August 5, 2011	Oakland Raiders
RB	Ahmad Bradshaw	UFA		New York Giants
CB	Courtney Brown	RFA		did not play
LB	Keith Bulluck	UFA		did not play
WR	Michael Clayton	UFA		New York Giants
DT	Barry Cofield	UFA		Washington Redskins
S	Deon Grant	UFA		New York Giants
WR	Derek Hagan	UFA		Oakland Raiders
WR	Domenik Hixon	UFA	March 3, 2011	New York Giants
S	Michael Johnson	UFA		Detroit Lions
DE	Mathias Kiwanuka	UFA		New York Giants
OT	Jamon Meredith	ERFA	March 3, 2011	New York Giants
TE/FB	Bear Pascoe	ERFA	March 3, 2011	New York Giants
WR	Steve Smith	UFA		Philadelphia Eagles
QB	Jim Sorgi	UFA		did not play
DE	Dave Tollefson	UFA		New York Giants
RB	DJ Ware	RFA	March 2, 2011	New York Giants
LB	Gerris Wilkinson	UFA		Jacksonville Jaguars
RFA: Restricted free agent, UFA: Unrestricted free agent, ERFA: Exclusive rights free agent

=== Roster ===
2011 New York Giants roster
Quarterbacks (QB): 8 David Carr; 10 Eli Manning; Running backs (RB): 44 Ahmad Bradshaw; 45 Henry Hynoski FB; 27 Brandon Jacobs; 33 Da'Rel Scott; 28 DJ Ware; Wide receivers (WR): 13 Ramses Barden; 80 Victor Cruz; 12 Jerrel Jernigan KR; 88 Hakeem Nicks; 15 Devin Thomas; 82 Mario Manningham; Tight ends (TE): 85 Jake Ballard; 47 Travis Beckum; 86 Bear Pascoe	Offensive linemen (OL): 64 David Baas C; 77 Kevin Boothe C/G; 79 James Brewer T; 63 Jim Cordle C; 66 David Diehl G/T; 67 Kareem McKenzie T; 62 Mitch Petrus G; 76 Chris Snee G; 70 Tony Ugoh T; Defensive linemen (DL): 95 Rocky Bernard DT; 99 Chris Canty DT; 97 Linval Joseph DT; 73 Jimmy Kennedy DT; 90 Jason Pierre-Paul DE; 71 Dave Tollefson DE; 69 Justin Trattou DE; 91 Justin Tuck DE; 72 Osi Umenyiora DE	Linebackers (LB): 93 Chase Blackburn MLB; 59 Michael Boley OLB; 58 Mark Herzlich MLB; 53 Greg Jones MLB; 94 Mathias Kiwanuka OLB; 55 Spencer Paysinger OLB; 57 Jacquian Williams OLB; Defensive backs (DB): 20 Prince Amukamara CB; 36 Will Blackmon CB; 34 Deon Grant SS; 22 Derrick Martin SS; 21 Kenny Phillips SS; 26 Antrel Rolle FS; 31 Aaron Ross CB; 39 Tyler Sash FS; 23 Corey Webster CB; Special teams (ST): 51 Zak DeOssie LS; 9 Lawrence Tynes K; 5 Steve Weatherford P	Practice squad: 41 Brandon Bing CB; 35 Andre Brown RB; 60 Selvish Capers T; 19 Dan DePalma WR; 74 Dwayne Hendricks DT; 48 Christian Hopkins TE; 18 Isaiah Stanback WR; 98 Adrian Tracy LB; Reserve: 78 Stacy Andrews T (IR); 96 Marvin Austin DT (IR); 65 Will Beatty T (IR); 83 Michael Clayton WR (IR); 37 Michael Coe CB (IR); 54 Jonathan Goff MLB (IR); 87 Domenik Hixon WR (IR); 25 Bruce Johnson CB (IR); 35 Chad Jones SS (NF-Inj.); 95 Martin Parker DT (IR); 52 Clint Sintim OLB (IR); 24 Terrell Thomas CB (IR); 30 Justin Tryon CB (IR); 29 Brian Witherspoon CB (IR); Rookies in italics 53 active, 14 reserve, 8 practice squad

== Staff ==
=== Staff changes ===
- On March 9, 2011, the assistant special teams Thomas McGaughey accepted a job at LSU as special teams/defensive line coach of their football team. He had been with the Giants since 2007.
- On June 24, 2011, it was reported that Larry Izzo would become the Giants' new assistant special teams coach once the NFL Lockout had ceased.

2011 New York Giants staff
Front office: President/CEO – John Mara; Chairman/executive vice president – Steve Tisch; Senior vice president/general manager – Jerry Reese; Vice president of player evaluation – Chris Mara; Assistant general manager – Kevin Abrams; Director of pro personnel – David Gettleman; Director of college scouting – Marc Ross; Assistant director of pro personnel – Ken Sternfeld; Head coaches: Head coach – Tom Coughlin; Offensive coaches: Offensive coordinator – Kevin Gilbride; Quarterbacks – Mike Sullivan; Running backs – Jerald Ingram; Wide receivers – Sean Ryan; Tight ends – Mike Pope; Offensive line – Pat Flaherty; Assistant offensive line – Jack Bicknell, Jr.; Offensive assistant – Kevin Gilbride, Jr.	Defensive coaches: Defensive coordinator – Perry Fewell; Defensive line – Robert Nunn; Linebackers – Jim Herrmann; Secondary/cornerbacks – Peter Giunta; Secondary/safeties – David Merritt; Defensive assistant – Al Holcomb; Special team coaches: Special teams coordinator – Tom Quinn; Assistant special teams – Larry Izzo; Strength and conditioning: Strength and conditioning – Jerry Palmieri; Assistant strength and conditioning – Markus Paul

== Schedule ==
=== Preseason ===
The Giants' preseason schedule was announced on April 12, 2011.

Week	Date	Opponent	Result	Record	Game site	NFL.com recap
1	August 13	at Carolina Panthers	L 10–20	0–1	Bank of America Stadium	Recap
2	August 22	Chicago Bears	W 41–13	1–1	MetLife Stadium	Recap
3	August 29^{§}	New York Jets	L 3–17	1–2	MetLife Stadium	Recap
4	September 1	at New England Patriots	W 18–17	2–2	Gillette Stadium	Recap

§ – Due to Hurricane Irene, the Week 3 preseason game against the Jets was moved up to 2:00 p.m. from the originally scheduled time of 7:00 p.m. (EDT). Then, later in the evening of August 26, the game was rescheduled to Monday, August 29 at 7:00 pm. EDT

=== Regular season ===
Week	Date	Opponent	Result	Record	Game site	NFL.com recap
1	September 11	at Washington Redskins	L 14–28	0–1	FedExField	Recap
2	September 19	St. Louis Rams	W 28–16	1–1	MetLife Stadium	Recap
3	September 25	at Philadelphia Eagles	W 29–16	2–1	Lincoln Financial Field	Recap
4	October 2	at Arizona Cardinals	W 31–27	3–1	University of Phoenix Stadium	Recap
5	October 9	Seattle Seahawks	L 25–36	3–2	MetLife Stadium	Recap
6	October 16	Buffalo Bills	W 27–24	4–2	MetLife Stadium	Recap
7	Bye					
8	October 30	Miami Dolphins	W 20–17	5–2	MetLife Stadium	Recap
9	November 6	at New England Patriots	W 24–20	6–2	Gillette Stadium	Recap
10	November 13	at San Francisco 49ers	L 20–27	6–3	Candlestick Park	Recap
11	November 20	Philadelphia Eagles	L 10–17	6–4	MetLife Stadium	Recap
12	November 28	at New Orleans Saints	L 24–49	6–5	Mercedes-Benz Superdome	Recap
13	December 4	Green Bay Packers	L 35–38	6–6	MetLife Stadium	Recap
14	December 11	at Dallas Cowboys	W 37–34	7–6	Cowboys Stadium	Recap
15	December 18	Washington Redskins	L 10–23	7–7	MetLife Stadium	Recap
16	December 24	at New York Jets	W 29–14	8–7	MetLife Stadium	Recap
17	January 1	Dallas Cowboys	W 31–14	9–7	MetLife Stadium	Recap

== Standings ==
NFC East
	W	L	T	PCT	DIV	CONF	PF	PA	STK
^{(4)} New York Giants	9	7	0	.563	3–3	5–7	394	400	W2
Philadelphia Eagles	8	8	0	.500	5–1	6–6	396	328	W4
Dallas Cowboys	8	8	0	.500	2–4	6–6	369	347	L2
Washington Redskins	5	11	0	.313	2–4	5–7	288	367	L2

NFC
#	Team	Division	W	L	T	PCT	DIV	CONF	SOS	SOV	STK
Division winners
1	Green Bay Packers	North	15	1	0	.938	6–0	12–0	.457	.458	W2
2 (Note: San Francisco clinched the No. 2 seed over New Orleans based on conference record (10–2 to 9–3).)	San Francisco 49ers	West	13	3	0	.813	5–1	10–2	.449	.418	W3
3	New Orleans Saints	South	13	3	0	.813	5–1	9–3	.441	.442	W8
4	New York Giants	East	9	7	0	.563	3–3	5–7	.520	.465	W2
Wild cards
5 (Note: Atlanta clinched the No. 5 seed over Detroit based on a head-to-head victory.)	Atlanta Falcons	South	10	6	0	.625	3–3	7–5	.480	.375	W1
6	Detroit Lions	North	10	6	0	.625	3–3	6–6	.535	.394	L1
Did not qualify for the postseason
7 (Note: Chicago finished ahead of Arizona based on common record (4–1 against 3–2 versus Philadelphia, Seattle, Carolina and Minnesota).)	Chicago Bears	North	8	8	0	.500	3–3	7–5	.527	.406	W1
8 (Note: Arizona finished ahead of Philadelphia based on a head-to-head victory.)	Arizona Cardinals	West	8	8	0	.500	4–2	7–5	.469	.391	W1
9 (Note: Philadelphia finished ahead of Dallas based on head-to-head sweep.)	Philadelphia Eagles	East	8	8	0	.500	5–1	6–6	.488	.398	W4
10	Dallas Cowboys	East	8	8	0	.500	2–4	6–6	.473	.375	L2
11	Seattle Seahawks	West	7	9	0	.438	3–3	6–6	.512	.438	L2
12	Carolina Panthers	South	6	10	0	.375	2–4	3–9	.504	.313	L1
13	Washington Redskins	East	5	11	0	.313	2–4	5–7	.477	.438	L2
14	Tampa Bay Buccaneers	South	4	12	0	.250	2–4	3–9	.551	.438	L10
15	Minnesota Vikings	North	3	13	0	.188	0–6	3–9	.559	.396	L1
16	St. Louis Rams	West	2	14	0	.125	0–6	1–11	.590	.531	L7
Tiebreakers (Note: When breaking ties for three or more teams under the NFL's rules, they are first broken within divisions, then comparing only the highest-ranked remaining team from each division.)

== Regular season results ==
=== Week 1: at Washington Redskins ===
Week One: New York Giants at Washington Redskins – Game summary

Quarter	1	2	3	4	Total
Giants	7	7	0	0	14
Redskins	0	14	7	7	28

at FedExField, Landover, Maryland

- Date: September 11
- Game time: 4:15 p.m. EDT
- Game weather: 87 °F (31 °C), Sunny
- Game attendance: 80,121
- Referee: Ron Winter
- TV announcers (Fox): Joe Buck, Troy Aikman and Pam Oliver

Game information

First quarter

- NYG Manning 2-yard run (Tynes kick) (4 plays, 70 yards, 0:35) (NYG 7–0)

Second quarter

- WAS Hightower 1-yard run (Graham Gano kick) (11–66, 5:32) (Tied 7–7)
- NYG Bradshaw 6-yard run (Tynes kick) (8–85, 4:44) (NYG 14–7)
- WAS Anthony Armstrong 6-yard pass from Grossman (Gano kick) (5–80, 2:11) (Tied 14–14)

Third quarter

- WAS Ryan Kerrigan 9-yard interception return (Gano kick) (WSH 21–14)

Fourth quarter

- WAS Jabar Gaffney 4-yard pass from Grossman (Gano kick) (10–70, 5:53) (WSH 28–14)

Top passers

- NYG – Eli Manning – 18/32, 268 YDS, INT
- WAS – Rex Grossman – 21/34, 305 YDS, 2 TD

Top rushers

- NYG – Ahmad Bradshaw – 13 CAR, 44 YDS, TD
- WAS – Tim Hightower – 25 CAR, 72 YDS, TD

Top receivers

- NYG – Hakeem Nicks – 7 REC, 122 YDS
- WAS – Fred Davis – 5 REC, 105 YDS

Top tacklers

- NYG – Kenny Phillips – 5 TKL, 4 AST
- WAS – Reed Doughty – 8 TKL, 2 AST

The Giants opened the 2011 season where they had finished the 2010 season, on the road at FedExField against their division rival Washington Redskins to mark the tenth anniversary of September 11, 2001; both teams' cities were attacked by the terrorists that day.

New York had not lost to Washington in the regular season in their last six meetings, but fell in this meeting 28–14. After scoring two first-quarter touchdowns and taking a 14–7 lead, the Giants failed to score again. A Ryan Kerrigan interception return in the third quarter put the Redskins in front and a defensive stop gave the Redskins the ball back. They added an insurance score in the fourth quarter when Rex Grossman found Jabar Gaffney in the end zone and iced the game. Grossman threw for 305 yards and two touchdowns, while Eli Manning threw for 268 with the one interception.

=== Week 2: vs. St. Louis Rams ===
Week Two: St. Louis Rams at New York Giants – Game summary

Quarter	1	2	3	4	Total
Rams	6	0	10	0	16
Giants	7	14	7	0	28

at MetLife Stadium, East Rutherford, New Jersey

- Date: September 19
- Game time: 8:30 pm. EDT
- Game weather: 60 °F (16 °C), Clear
- Game attendance: 78,290
- Referee: Terry McAulay
- TV announcers (ESPN): Mike Tirico, Ron Jaworski, Jon Gruden and Suzy Kolber

Game information

First quarter

- STL Josh Brown 21-yard FG (9–84, 3:19) (STL 3–0)
- NYG Nicks 3-yard pass from Manning (Tynes kick) (5–38, 2:17) (NYG 7–3)
- STL Brown 25-yard FG (10–67, 2:26) (NYG 7–6)

Second quarter

- NYG Boley 65-yard fumble return (Tynes kick) (NYG 14–6)
- NYG Hixon 22-yard pass from Manning (Tynes kick) (8–86, 2:37) (NYG 21–6)

Third quarter

- STL Brown 27-yard FG (8–60, 3:11) (NYG 21–9)
- NYG Jacobs 9-yard run (Tynes kick) (10–81, 5:30) (NYG 28–9)
- STL Alexander 19-yard pass from Bradford (Brown kick) (13–72, 5:01) (NYG 28–16)

Top passers

- STL – Sam Bradford – 22/46, 331 YDS, TD
- NYG – Eli Manning – 18/29, 200 YDS, 2 TD, INT

Top rushers

- STL – Cadillac Williams – 13 CAR, 36 YDS
- NYG – Ahmad Bradshaw – 15 CAR, 59 YDS

Top receivers

- STL – Danario Alexander – 3 REC, 122 YDS, TD
- NYG – Mario Manningham – 3 REC, 56 YDS

Top tacklers

- STL – James Laurinaitis – 9 TKL, 5 AST
- NYG – Antrel Rolle – 8 TKL, AST

The Giants' home opener was played on Monday night and they took a 28–16 victory over the NFC West runners-up from the previous year. The Rams, coached by former Giants defensive coordinator Steve Spagnuolo, took an early lead on a Josh Brown field goal, but that would be their only lead as Eli Manning hit Hakeem Nicks and Domenik Hixon for touchdowns. A Michael Boley fumble return added to that and gave New York a 21–6 lead at the half. St. Louis' only touchdown came in the third quarter as Bradford found Alexander to cut the Giants' lead to 28–16, where the game finished. Manning finished with 200 yards passing and threw his first two touchdown passes of the season while Bradford threw for 331 and one score. After the game, it was announced that Hixon would be lost for the year with a torn ACL.

=== Week 3: at Philadelphia Eagles ===
Week Three: New York Giants at Philadelphia Eagles – Game summary

Quarter	1	2	3	4	Total
Giants	14	0	0	15	29
Eagles	0	13	3	0	16

at Lincoln Financial Field, Philadelphia, Pennsylvania

- Date: September 25
- Game time: 1:00 pm. EDT
- Game weather: 76 °F (24 °C), Cloudy
- Game attendance: 69,144
- Referee: Jeff Triplette
- TV announcers (Fox): Kenny Albert, Daryl Johnston and Tony Siragusa

Game information

First quarter

- NYG Jacobs 40-yard pass from Manning (Tynes kick) (6–73, 2:43) (NYG 7–0)
- NYG Cruz 74-yard pass from Manning (Tynes kick) (3–82, 1:26) (NYG 14–0)

Second quarter

- PHI Alex Henery 21-yard FG (15–77, 8:02) (NYG 14–3)
- PHI McCoy 11-yard run (Henery kick) (7–71, 3:21) (NYG 14–10)
- PHI Henery 38-yard FG (5–26, 1:12) (NYG 14–13)

Third quarter

- PHI Henery 21-yard FG (14–88, 8:52) (PHI 16–14)

Fourth quarter

- NYG Cruz 28-yard pass from Manning (Jacobs run) (7–54, 3:30) (NYG 22–16)
- NYG Bradshaw 18-yard pass from Manning (Tynes kick) (10–56, 4:28) (NYG 29–16)

Top passers

- NYG – Eli Manning – 16/23, 254 YDS, 4 TD
- PHI – Michael Vick – 16/23, 176 YDS, INT

Top rushers

- NYG – Ahmad Bradshaw – 15 CAR, 86 YDS
- PHI – LeSean McCoy – 24 CAR, 128 YDS, TD

Top receivers

- NYG – Victor Cruz – 3 REC, 110 YDS, 2 TD
- PHI – Jeremy Maclin – 5 REC, 69 YDS

Top tacklers

- NYG – Jason Pierre-Paul – 7 TKL, 2 AST, 2 SK
- PHI – Trent Cole – 4 TKL, AST, SK

Taking to the road to face another divisional rival, the Giants took care of the Eagles in Philadelphia for the first time since 2008 after having lost the previous five meetings. It was the teams' first meeting since the infamous finish to their second matchup in 2010 which saw DeSean Jackson return a punt for a touchdown as time expired. Giants receiver Victor Cruz had a breakout game with 3 receptions for 110 yards and 2 touchdowns. Manning threw for 254 yards and four touchdowns. Jason Pierre-Paul added two sacks and Ahmad Bradshaw ran for 86 yards. Michael Vick threw for 176 yards and an interception and was knocked out of the game.

=== Week 4: at Arizona Cardinals ===
Week Four: New York Giants at Arizona Cardinals – Game summary

Quarter	1	2	3	4	Total
Giants	0	10	0	21	31
Cardinals	3	3	14	7	27

at University of Phoenix Stadium, Glendale, Arizona

- Date: October 2
- Game time: 4:05 pm. EDT/1:05 p.m. Arizona Time
- Game weather: Played indoors (retractable roof closed)
- Game attendance: 60,496
- Referee: Jerome Boger
- TV announcers (Fox): Kenny Albert, Daryl Johnston and Tony Siragusa

Game information

First quarter

- ARI Jay Feely 27-yard FG (4–7, 1:35) (ARI 3–0)

Second quarter

- ARI Feely 27-yard FG (16–79, 9:20) (ARI 6–0)
- NYG Bradshaw 13-yard run (Tynes kick) (10–69, 5:03) (NYG 7–6)
- NYG Tynes 30-yard FG (5:61, 0:28) (NYG 10–6)

Third quarter

- ARI Wells 1-yard run (Feely kick) (8–78, 4:36) (ARI 13–10)
- ARI Wells 1-yard run (Feely kick) (2–5, 0:40) (ARI 20–10)

Fourth quarter

- NYG Jacobs 1-yard run (Tynes kick) (13–75, 5:48) (ARI 20–17)
- ARI Wells 2-yard run (Feely kick) (6–77, 3:09) (ARI 27–17)
- NYG Ballard 2-yard pass from Manning (Tynes kick) (7–80, 1:39) (ARI 27–24)
- NYG Nicks 28-yard pass from Manning (Tynes kick) (2–48, 0:31) (NYG 31–27)

Top passers

- NYG – Eli Manning – 27/40, 321 YDS, 2 TD
- ARI – Kevin Kolb – 20/34, 237 YDS, INT

Top rushers

- NYG – Ahmad Bradshaw – 12 CAR, 39 YDS, TD
- ARI – Beanie Wells – 27 CAR, 138 YDS, 3 TD

Top receivers

- NYG – Hakeem Nicks – 10 REC, 162 YDS, TD
- ARI – Larry Fitzgerald – 8 REC, 102 YDS

Top tacklers

- NYG – Michael Boley – 5 TKL, 2 AST
- ARI – Patrick Peterson – 7 TKL

After trailing the Cardinals for most of the game, the Giants scored two touchdowns in the final 100 seconds of the game for their second comeback victory in as many games. Arizona led 20–10 entering the fourth on the strength of two Beanie Wells rushing touchdowns and two Jay Feely field goals. The Giants were aided by a controversial play on their final drive when Victor Cruz appeared to fumble the ball without being tackled. However, upon review it was determined that he had willfully given himself up before he fumbled and as such, he was considered to be down. On the next play Eli Manning snapped the ball before the Cardinals defense was set and threw the game-winning touchdown pass to Hakeem Nicks. Kolb drove the Cardinals into field goal range on their final drive, but a sack by Osi Umenyiora and pass breakup by Corey Webster sealed the win for the Giants. Wells rushed for 138 and three scores while Larry Fitzgerald caught eight of Kevin Kolb's passes for 102 yards. Manning finished 27–40 with 321 passing yards and 2 touchdowns, both in the 4th quarter. Nicks finished with 10 grabs for 162 yards and a touchdown.

=== Week 5: vs. Seattle Seahawks ===
Week Five: Seattle Seahawks at New York Giants – Game summary

Quarter	1	2	3	4	Total
Seahawks	14	0	2	20	36
Giants	7	7	0	11	25

at MetLife Stadium, East Rutherford, New Jersey

- Date: October 9
- Game time: 1:00 pm. EDT
- Game weather: 81 °F (27 °C), Sunny
- Game attendance: 78,650
- Referee: Ed Hochuli
- TV announcers (Fox): Thom Brennaman, Troy Aikman and Pam Oliver

Game information

First quarter

- SEA Ben Obomanu 11-yard pass from Jackson (Steven Hauschka kick) (8–80, 2:32) (SEA 7–0)
- NYG Ballard 12-yard pass from Manning (Tynes kick) (7–80, 3:20) (Tied 7–7)
- SEA Lynch 1-yard run (Hauschka kick) (2–48, 0:17) (SEA 14–7)

Second quarter

- NYG Nicks 19-yard pass from Manning (Tynes kick) (4–59, 0:40) (Tied 14–14)

Third quarter

- SEA Anthony Hargrove tackled Ware in end zone for a Safety (SEA 16–14)

Fourth quarter

- SEA Hauschka 51-yard FG (9–33, 2:45) (SEA 19–14)
- NYG Cruz 68-yard pass from Manning (Bradshaw run) (3–65, 1:51) (NYG 22–19)
- SEA Hauschka 43-yard FG (4–0, 0:24) (Tied 22–22)
- NYG Tynes 26-yard FG (10–72, 5:26) (NYG 25–22)
- SEA Baldwin 27-yard pass from Charlie Whitehurst (Hauschka kick) (7–80, 2:12) (SEA 29–25)
- SEA Brandon Browner 94-yard interception return (Hauschka kick) (SEA 36–25)

Top passers

- SEA – Tarvaris Jackson – 15/22, 166 YDS, TD, INT
- NYG – Eli Manning – 24/39, 420 YDS, 3 TD, 3 INT

Top rushers

- SEA – Marshawn Lynch – 12 CAR, 98 YDS, TD
- NYG – Ahmad Bradshaw – 17 CAR, 58 YDS

Top receivers

- SEA – Doug Baldwin – 8 REC, 136 YDS, TD
- NYG – Victor Cruz – 8 REC, 161 YDS, TD

Top tacklers

- SEA – Leroy Hill – 5 TKL, 3 AST
- NYG – Jacquian Williams – 7 TKL, AST

The Giants could not contain their momentum from the previous week's comeback and lost a mistaken-laden game to the Seattle Seahawks. Victor Cruz had a play-of-the-year candidate touchdown catch in the third quarter as he caught the ball off his own deflection and ran it 68 yards to give the Giants a 22–19 lead in the fourth. Marshawn Lynch led all rushers with 98 yards and a touchdown while Cruz recorded 161 receiving yards. Seahawks wide receiver Doug Baldwin responded with a go-ahead touchdown of his own, to give his team a 29–25 lead. While the Giants were in the red zone to win the game, Cruz slipped on a pass from Manning, and the pass was intercepted by Brandon Browner, who returned it for a Seahawks touchdown, ending the game. Seahawks backup quarterback Charlie Whitehurst finished the game for an injured Tarvaris Jackson, who finished 15 for 22 for 166 yards. Baldwin and Cruz tied for the game lead with receptions with eight and both recorded a touchdown. Despite Eli Manning throwing three touchdowns and for over 400 yards, his three interceptions proved costly.

=== Week 6: vs. Buffalo Bills ===
Week Six: Buffalo Bills at New York Giants – Game summary

Quarter	1	2	3	4	Total
Bills	14	3	0	7	24
Giants	7	10	7	3	27

at MetLife Stadium, East Rutherford, New Jersey

- Date: October 16
- Game time: 1:00 pm. EDT
- Game weather: 65 °F (18 °C), Sunny
- Game attendance: 79,243
- Referee: Clete Blakeman
- TV announcers (CBS): Jim Nantz and Phil Simms

Game information

First quarter

- NYG Bradshaw 1-yard run (Tynes kick) (9–69, 4:02) (NYG 7–0)
- BUF Jackson 80-yard run (Rian Lindell kick) (1–80, 0:14) (Tied 7–7)
- BUF Naaman Roosevelt 60-yard pass from Fitzpatrick (Lindell kick) (6–78, 2:49) (BUF 14–7)

Second quarter

- NYG Tynes 26-yard FG (13–84, 5:33) (BUF 14–10)
- NYG Bradshaw 1-yard run (Tynes kick) (5–89, 2:30) (NYG 17–14)
- BUF Lindell 49-yard FG (6–49, 2:19) (Tied 17–17)

Third quarter

- NYG Bradshaw 1-yard run (Tynes kick) (10–75, 5:07) (NYG 24–17)

Fourth quarter

- BUF Stevie Johnson 9-yard pass from Fitzpatrick (Lindell kick) (12–60, 7:02) (Tied 24–24)
- NYG Tynes 23-yard FG (9–76, 2:30) (NYG 27–24)

Top passers

- BUF – Ryan Fitzpatrick – 21/30, 244 YDS, 2 TD, 2 INT
- NYG – Eli Manning – 21/32, 292 YDS

Top rushers

- BUF – Fred Jackson – 16 CAR, 121 YDS, TD
- NYG – Ahmad Bradshaw – 26 CAR, 104 YDS, 3 TD

Top receivers

- BUF – David Nelson – 4 REC, 62 YDS
- NYG – Hakeem Nicks – 4 REC, 96 YDS

Top tacklers

- BUF – Terrence McGee – 11 TKL
- NYG – Michael Boley – 7 TKL, AST

The Buffalo Bills surprised the NFL world when they opened up to a 4–1 record coming into this game compared to the Giants' 3–2 record. The Giants bounced back from their loss to the Seahawks last week at Metlife Stadium by recording another last-minute win, beating the Bills 27–24 on a Lawrence Tynes field goal. Buffalo took an early 14–7 lead on two big offensive plays, an 80-yard run by Fred Jackson and a 60-yard pass from Ryan Fitzpatrick to Naaman Roosevelt. Ahmad Bradshaw recorded three one-yard touchdown runs and recorded his first 100-yard game of the year while Jackson rushed for 121. Hakeem Nicks led all receivers in yards with 96 and Eli Manning threw for 292 yards with no touchdowns. Fitzpatrick recorded two passing touchdowns but also threw two interceptions.

=== Week 8: vs. Miami Dolphins ===
Week Eight: Miami Dolphins at New York Giants – Game summary

Quarter	1	2	3	4	Total
Dolphins	7	7	3	0	17
Giants	3	7	0	10	20

at MetLife Stadium, East Rutherford, New Jersey

- Date: October 30
- Game time: 1:00 pm. EDT
- Game weather: 41 °F (5 °C), Sunny
- Game attendance: 79,302
- Referee: Ron Winter
- TV announcers (CBS): Greg Gumbel and Dan Dierdorf

Game information

First quarter

- MIA Steve Slaton 1-yard run (Dan Carpenter kick) (10–66, 5:56) (MIA 7–0)
- NYG Tynes 25-yard FG (7–56, 3:53) (MIA 7–3)

Second quarter

- MIA Moore 1-yard run (Carpenter kick) (12–90, 5:40) (MIA 14–3)
- NYG Manningham 7-yard pass from Manning (Tynes kick) (13–84, 4:01) (MIA 14–10)

Third quarter

- MIA Carpenter 40-yard FG (7–58, 2:43) (MIA 17–10)

Fourth quarter

- NYG Tynes 29-yard FG (12–78, 7:08) (MIA 17–13)
- NYG Cruz 25-yard pass from Manning (Tynes kick) (6–53, 2:30) (NYG 20–17)

Top passers

- MIA – Matt Moore – 13/22, 138 YDS, INT
- NYG – Eli Manning – 31/45, 349 YDS, 2 TD

Top rushers

- MIA – Reggie Bush – 15 CAR, 103 YDS
- NYG – Ahmad Bradshaw – 13 CAR, 50 YDS

Top receivers

- MIA – Brandon Marshall – 4 REC, 55 YDS
- NYG – Victor Cruz – 7 REC, 99 YDS, TD

Top tacklers

- MIA – Kevin Burnett – 7 TKL, 3 AST
- NYG – Mathias Kiwanuka – 5 TKL, 2 AST, 1.5 SK

The Giants again found themselves trailing the winless Dolphins entering the fourth quarter. New York was down 17–10 behind two rushing touchdowns, one by wildcat quarterback Steve Slaton and the other by starter Matt Moore, and a Dan Carpenter field goal. Lawrence Tynes recorded a field goal of his own while Eli Manning threw a touchdown to Mario Manningham in the second quarter. After Tynes recorded his second field goal in the fourth, Manning found Victor Cruz for a 25-yard touchdown with 2:30 left to give the Giants the victory. Cruz recorded 99 yards on seven receptions while Manning threw for 349 yards and two touchdowns. Reggie Bush led all runners with 103 yards and Moore threw for 138 and an interception.

=== Week 9: at New England Patriots ===
Week Nine: New York Giants at New England Patriots – Game summary

Quarter	1	2	3	4	Total
Giants	0	0	10	14	24
Patriots	0	0	3	17	20

at Gillette Stadium, Foxborough, Massachusetts

- Date: November 6
- Game time: 4:15 pm. EST
- Game weather: 54 °F (12 °C), Sunny
- Game attendance: 68,756
- Referee: Pete Morelli
- TV announcers (Fox): Joe Buck, Troy Aikman, and Pam Oliver

Game information

Third quarter

- NYG Tynes 22-yard FG (7–57, 3:29) (NYG 3–0)
- NYG Jacobs 10-yard run (Tynes kick) (1–10, 0:05) (NYG 10–0)
- NE Stephen Gostkowski 32-yard FG (7–19, 2:50) (NYG 10–3)

Fourth quarter

- NE Aaron Hernandez 5-yard pass from Brady (Gostkowski kick) (7:80, 2:41) (Tied 10–10)
- NE Gostkowski 45-yard FG (9–53, 3:55) (NE 13–10)
- NYG Manningham 10-yard pass from Manning (Tynes kick) (8–85, 4:05) (NYG 17–13)
- NE Rob Gronkowski 14-yard pass from Brady (Gostkowski kick) (9–64, 1:27) (NE 20–17)
- NYG Ballard 1-yard pass from Manning (Tynes kick) (8–80, 1:21) (NYG 24–20)

Top passers

- NYG – Eli Manning – 20/39, 250 YDS, 2 TD, INT
- NE – Tom Brady – 28/49, 342 YDS, 2 TD, 2 INT

Top rushers

- NYG – Brandon Jacobs – 18 CAR, 72 YDS, TD
- NE – BenJarvus Green-Ellis – 12 CAR, 52 YDS

Top receivers

- NYG – Victor Cruz – 6 REC, 91 YDS
- NE – Wes Welker – 9 REC, 136 YDS

Top tacklers

- NYG – Mathias Kiwanuka – 6 TKL, 6 AST, INT
- NE – Rob Ninkovich – 4 TKL, 3 AST

In the rematch of Super Bowl XLII and Super Bowl XLVI preview, Tom Brady was picked off two times in this game. With the ball at the New York 29, Brady's pass was tipped by Michael Boley and intercepted by Mathias Kiwanuka, who returned it to the Giants 28, for Brady's 2nd pick of the game. However, the next possession had the Patriots drive down to the Giants 12. Stephen Gostowski's 27-yard field goal went slight left, making this the first time the Patriots had no score at halftime since December 10, 2006. In this game, turnovers marred both teams. First, Lawrence Tynes kicked a 22-yard field goal that put them on 3–0. Then Brandon Jacobs ran it in 10 yards to put the Giants up 10–0. After that, Aaron Ross muffed the punt, giving the Patriots the ball at the Giants 33. However, they could only muster a 32-yard field goal. Devin Thomas muffed his punt, but scooped it up. Then, Julian Edelman fumbled the punt in Giants territory. Driving in the red zone, Manning got picked off by Kyle Arrington in the end zone. Seven plays later, Brady hit Aaron Hernandez for a 5-yard touchdown, tying the game at 10 just 32 seconds into the fourth quarter. With 7:08, Gostkowski's 45-yard field goal gave the Pats their first lead of the game, 13–10. Manning then led the Giants on an 85-yard march to a 10-yard touchdown pass to Mario Manningham with 3:03 remaining, putting the Giants on top 17–13. It looked like the Pats would win with a comeback of their own when Tom Brady threw a 14-yard pass to Rob Gronkowski, making it 20–17 with 1:36 to go. However, leading the New York Giants 80 yards in just over a minute, Manning hit Jake Ballard for a 1-yard touchdown with 15 seconds left for a 24–20 win on Sunday, repeating a come-from-behind victory similar to the 2008 title game between the teams. They were helped by a 20-yard pass interference penalty against safety Sergio Brown of the Patriots (5–3) that put the ball at the 1 with 30 seconds left. The Giants shocked the NFL and opened up to a 6–2 record. Eli Manning was praised by critics for his recent comeback victories. This was the first time the Patriots lost at home with Tom Brady as their quarterback in 31 regular season starts, and it was also the first Patriots loss at home where they had a 4th quarter lead in the Tom Brady era.

=== Week 10: at San Francisco 49ers ===
Week Ten: New York Giants at San Francisco 49ers – Game summary

Quarter	1	2	3	4	Total
Giants	3	3	7	7	20
49ers	3	6	3	15	27

at Candlestick Park, San Francisco, California

- Date: November 13
- Game time: 4:15 pm. EST/1:15 p.m. PST
- Game weather: 58 °F (14 °C), Sunny
- Game attendance: 69,732
- Referee: Tony Corrente
- TV announcers (Fox): Joe Buck, Troy Aikman and Pam Oliver

Game information

First quarter

- NYG Tynes 23-yard FG (14–75, 8:33) (NYG 3–0)
- SF David Akers 36-yard FG (12–62, 6:02) (Tied 3–3)

Second quarter

- NYG Tynes 25-yard FG (13–73, 6:20) (NYG 6–3)
- SF Akers 52-yard FG (6–46, 4:05) (Tied 6–6)
- SF Akers 39-yard FG (7–32, 3:11) (SF 9–6)

Third quarter

- SF Akers 28-yard FG (10–70, 3:46) (SF 12–6)
- NYG Manningham 13-yard pass from Manning (Tynes kick) (10–84, 5:38) (NYG 13–12)

Fourth quarter

- SF Vernon Davis 31-yard pass from Smith (Smith pass to Michael Crabtree) (4–50, 1:59) (SF 20–13)
- SF Hunter 17-yard run (Akers kick) (1–17, 0:05) (SF 27–13)
- NYG Nicks 32-yard pass from Manning (Tynes kick) (7–80, 3:44) (SF 27–20)

Top passers

- NYG – Eli Manning – 26/40, 311 YDS, 2 TD, 2 INT
- SF – Alex Smith – 19/30, 242 YDS, TD, INT

Top rushers

- NYG – Brandon Jacobs – 18 CAR, 55 YDS
- SF – Kendall Hunter – 6 CAR, 40 YDS, TD

Top receivers

- NYG – Victor Cruz – 6 REC, 84 YDS
- SF – Delanie Walker – 6 REC, 69 YDS

Top tacklers

- NYG – Kenny Phillips/Antrel Rolle – 4 TKL, AST each
- SF – NaVorro Bowman – 10 TKL, 4 AST

The Giants' winning streak came to an end in San Francisco but they once again had the game in doubt into the final minutes. Field goals comprised the first half scoring, with Lawrence Tynes hitting two and the 49ers' David Akers recording three. The Giants took their only lead in the third quarter as Eli Manning found Mario Manningham for 13 yards to complete an 84-yard drive. The 49ers recorded two touchdowns on a pass to Vernon Davis and a run by Kendall Hunter, while Manning hit Hakeem Nicks for a 32-yard touchdown late in the game. New York received the ball late in the game and drove inside the 49ers' red zone, but Manning's last pass was deflected at the line of scrimmage to preserve the San Francisco win. Manning threw for 311 yards and two touchdowns but also recorded two interceptions, while Alex Smith threw for 242 and the touchdown pass to Davis. Brandon Jacobs rushed for 55 yards to lead the runners while Victor Cruz's 84 yards was tops for the receivers.

=== Week 11: vs. Philadelphia Eagles ===
Week Eleven: Philadelphia Eagles at New York Giants – Game summary

Quarter	1	2	3	4	Total
Eagles	0	10	0	7	17
Giants	0	3	0	7	10

at MetLife Stadium, East Rutherford, New Jersey

- Date: November 20
- Game time: 8:20 pm. EST
- Game weather: 58 °F (14 °C), Partly Cloudy
- Game attendance: 79,743
- Referee: Mike Carey
- TV announcers (NBC): Al Michaels, Cris Collinsworth and Michele Tafoya

Game information

Second quarter

- PHI Alex Henery 33-yard FG (9–56, 3:29) (PHI 3–0)
- PHI Steve Smith 14-yard pass from Young (Henery kick) (1–14, 0:08) (PHI 10–0)
- NYG Tynes 48-yard FG (8–50, 1:22) (PHI 10–3)

Fourth quarter

- NYG Cruz 24-yard pass from Manning (Tynes kick) (5–73, 1:41) (Tied 10–10)
- PHI Riley Cooper 8-yard pass from Young (Henery kick) (18–80, 8:51) (PHI 17–10)

Top passers

- PHI – Vince Young – 23/36, 258 YDS, 2 TD, 3 INT
- NYG – Eli Manning – 18/35, 264 YDS, TD, INT

Top rushers

- PHI – LeSean McCoy – 23 CAR, 113 YDS
- NYG – Brandon Jacobs – 12 CAR, 21 YDS

Top receivers

- PHI – DeSean Jackson – 6 REC, 88 YDS
- NYG – Victor Cruz – 6 REC, 128 YDS, TD

Top tacklers

- PHI – Jamar Chaney – 4 TKL, 2 AST
- NYG – Mathias Kiwanuka – 6 TKL, AST

Playing on Sunday night for the first time all season, the Giants could not take advantage of three Vince Young interceptions and fumbled on their final drive, allowing the Eagles to salvage a split in the season series. New York fell behind 10–0 on an Alex Henery field goal and a touchdown pass from Young to former Giant Steve Smith. Trailing 10–3 entering the fourth, Eli Manning sought out Victor Cruz who caught a pass for 24 yards and the tying touchdown. However, they allowed Young to put together an 18-play drive finishing with a Riley Cooper touchdown pass. The Giants got the ball and Manning completed a pass to Cruz for 47 yards. The next play, Manning was stripped of the ball, sealing the Eagles victory. Despite his three interceptions Young threw for 258 yards in his relief effort for the injured Michael Vick. Manning threw for 264 yards, 128 of which went to Cruz. LeSean McCoy again rushed for 100 yards, recording 113 on 23 carries.

=== Week 12: at New Orleans Saints ===
Week Twelve: New York Giants at New Orleans Saints – Game summary

Quarter	1	2	3	4	Total
Giants	0	3	7	14	24
Saints	0	21	14	14	49

at Mercedes-Benz Superdome, New Orleans, Louisiana

- Date: November 28
- Game time: 8:30 pm. EST/7:30 p.m. CST
- Game weather: Played indoors (dome stadium)
- Game attendance: 73,068
- Referee: Gene Steratore
- TV announcers (ESPN): Mike Tirico, Ron Jaworski, Jon Gruden and Wendi Nix

Game information

Second quarter

- NO Lance Moore 4-yard pass from Brees (John Kasay kick) (10–80, 4:35) (NO 7-0)
- NYG Tynes 42-yard FG (9–46, 5:22) (NO 7-3)
- NO Graham 5-yard pass from Brees (Kasay kick) (7–80, 3:00) (NO 14-3)
- NO Moore 10-yard pass from Brees (Kasay kick) (6–88, 0:34) (NO 21-3)

Third quarter

- NYG Jacobs 8-yard run (Tynes kick) (6–67, 4:17) (NO 21-10)
- NO Brees 8-yard run (Kasay kick) (9–73, 4:55) (NO 28-10)
- NO Graham 29-yard pass from Brees (Kasay kick) (2–29, 0:13) (NO 35-10)

Fourth quarter

- NYG Cruz 72-yard pass from Manning (Tynes kick) (3–84, 1:21) (NO 35-17)
- NO Pierre Thomas 12-yard run (Kasay kick) (9–80, 4:09) (NO 42-17)
- NYG Cruz 4-yard pass from Manning (Tynes kick) (12–80, 5:29) (NO 42-24)
- NO Ingram 35-yard run (Kasay kick) (3–40, 1:01) (NO 49-24)

Top passers

- NYG – Eli Manning – 33/47, 406 YDS, 2 TD, INT
- NO – Drew Brees – 24/38, 363 YDS, 4 TD

Top rushers

- NYG – Brandon Jacobs – 13 CAR, 46 YDS, TD
- NO – Mark Ingram II – 13 CAR, 80 YDS, TD

Top receivers

- NYG – Victor Cruz – 9 REC, 157 YDS, TD
- NO – Jimmy Graham – 5 REC, 84 YDS, 2 TD

Top tacklers

- NYG – Jason Pierre-Paul – 5 TKL, AST
- NO – Tracy Porter – 8 TKL, 2 AST

The week 12 Monday night matchup with the Saints in New Orleans was perhaps the lowest point of the Giants' season. New York fell behind 21–3 at halftime and New Orleans cruised to a huge victory. Eli Manning threw for 406 yards and two touchdowns, both to Victor Cruz, but by that time the game had long been decided. Drew Brees recorded 363 yards and 4 touchdowns, two of which were recorded by Jimmy Graham, and rookie halfback Mark Ingram II picked up 80 yards on the ground and scored the game's final touchdown on a 35-yard run. The 49 points were the Giants' most given up to that point in the season.

=== Week 13: vs. Green Bay Packers ===
Week Thirteen: Green Bay Packers at New York Giants – Game summary

Quarter	1	2	3	4	Total
Packers	7	14	7	10	38
Giants	10	7	7	11	35

at MetLife Stadium, East Rutherford, New Jersey

- Date: December 4
- Game time: 4:15 pm. EST
- Game weather: 52 °F (11 °C), Fair
- Game attendance: 80,634
- Referee: Jeff Triplette
- TV announcers (Fox): Joe Buck, Troy Aikman and Pam Oliver

Game information

First quarter

- NYG Beckum 67-yard pass from Manning (Tynes kick) (3–79, 1:36) (NYG 7–0)
- GB Jermichael Finley 12-yard pass from Rodgers (Mason Crosby kick) (6–64, 2:56) (Tied 7–7)
- NYG Tynes 38-yard FG (6–51, 3:06) (NYG 10–7)

Second quarter

- GB Clay Matthews III 38-yard interception return (Crosby kick) (GB 14–10)
- NYG Jacobs 1-yard run (Tynes kick) (2–12, 0:36) (NYG 17–14)
- GB Donald Driver 13-yard pass from Rodgers (Crosby kick) (11–80, 5:34) (GB 21–17)

Third quarter

- GB Jennings 20-yard pass from Rodgers (Crosby kick) (10–80, 5:10) (GB 28–17)
- NYG Nicks 4-yard pass from Manning (Tynes kick) (5–71, 3:20) (GB 28–24)

Fourth quarter

- NYG Tynes 50-yard FG (14–68, 6:29) (GB 28–27)
- GB Driver 7-yard pass from Rodgers (Crosby kick) (8–57, 3:34) (GB 35–27)
- NYG Nicks 2-yard pass from Manning (Ware run) (9–69, 2:36) (Tied 35–35)
- GB Crosby 30-yard FG (5–68, 0:58) (GB 38–35)

Top passers

- GB – Aaron Rodgers – 28/46, 369 YDS, 4 TD, INT
- NYG – Eli Manning – 23/40, 347 YDS, 3 TD, INT

Top rushers

- GB – Aaron Rodgers – 4 CAR, 32 YDS
- NYG – Brandon Jacobs – 8 CAR, 59 YDS, TD

Top receivers

- GB – Greg Jennings – 7 REC, 94 YDS, TD
- NYG – Victor Cruz – 7 REC, 119 YDS

Top tacklers

- GB – Charlie Peprah – 6 TKL, 3 AST
- NYG – Linval Joseph – 9 TKL

Looking to snap their losing streak, the Giants took on the undefeated Super Bowl champion Packers at home following their blowout loss in New Orleans. New York rebounded from their poor offensive effort against the Saints by putting up 35 points on the defending Super Bowl Champions and had the lead three separate times during the course of the game. With 58 seconds remaining in the game and Green Bay leading 35–27, the Giants tied the game on a touchdown and two-point conversion by Eli Manning, Hakeem Nicks, and DJ Ware. The Giants could not stop Aaron Rodgers from leading the Packers back down the field, however, and Mason Crosby's field goal as time expired kept the hopes for an undefeated season in Green Bay alive for the moment. Manning threw three touchdown passes, with Nicks recording two and backup tight end Travis Beckum the other, and recorded 347 yards passing while Victor Cruz added 119 yards on seven catches. Rodgers recorded 369 yards and four touchdowns, two of which went to Donald Driver.

=== Week 14: at Dallas Cowboys ===
Week Fourteen: New York Giants at Dallas Cowboys – Game summary

Quarter	1	2	3	4	Total
Giants	5	10	7	15	37
Cowboys	7	10	3	14	34

at Cowboys Stadium, Arlington, Texas

- Date: December 11
- Game time: 8:20 pm. EST/7:20 pm. CST
- Game weather: Played indoors (roof closed)
- Game attendance: 95,952
- Referee: Scott Green
- TV announcers (NBC): Al Michaels, Cris Collinsworth and Michele Tafoya

Game information

First quarter

- NYG Pierre-Paul sacked Romo in end zone for a Safety (NYG 2–0)
- NYG Tynes 23-yard FG (7–66, 2:35) (NYG 5–0)
- DAL John Phillips 12-yard pass from Romo (Dan Bailey kick) (8–80, 4:18) (DAL 7–5)

Second quarter

- NYG Jacobs 1-yard run (Tynes kick) (10–80, 5:04) (NYG 12–7)
- DAL Robinson 9-yard pass from Romo (Bailey kick) (11–80, 6:19) (DAL 14–12)
- NYG Tynes 26-yard FG (4–6, 0:22) (NYG 15–14)
- DAL Bailey 49-yard FG (6–49, 0:48) (DAL 17–15)

Third quarter

- DAL Bailey 49-yard FG (11–41, 5:11) (DAL 20–15)
- NYG Manningham 47-yard pass from Manning (Tynes kick) (9–85, 3:12) (NYG 22–20)

Fourth quarter

- DAL Miles Austin 6-yard pass from Romo (Bailey kick) (4–80, 1:31) (DAL 27–22)
- DAL Dez Bryant 50-yard pass from Romo (Bailey kick) (2–49, 0:54) (DAL 34–22)
- NYG Ballard 8-yard pass from Manning (Tynes kick) (8–80, 2:27) (DAL 34–29)
- NYG Jacobs 1-yard run (Ware run) (6–58, 1:26) (NYG 37–34)

Top passers

- NYG – Eli Manning – 27/47, 400 YDS, 2 TD, INT
- DAL – Tony Romo – 21/31, 321 YDS, 4 TD

Top rushers

- NYG – Brandon Jacobs – 19 CAR, 101 YDS, 2 TD
- DAL – Felix Jones – 16 CAR, 106 YDS

Top receivers

- NYG – Hakeem Nicks – 7 REC, 154 YDS
- DAL – Laurent Robinson – 4 REC, 137 YDS, TD

Top tacklers

- NYG – Jason Pierre-Paul – 6 TKL, 2 AST, 2 SK, SFTY
- DAL – Sean Lee – 5 TKL, 4 AST

The Giants went to Arlington, Texas for their first meeting with the division rival Cowboys. Once again, the Giants were able to record a victory in the final minutes. Trailing late in the fourth quarter, Eli Manning recorded a touchdown pass to tight end Jake Ballard to pull the team within five. After Tony Romo failed to hit Miles Austin on a third down and short on the Cowboys' next drive, the Giants drove down the field in 1:26 and Brandon Jacobs scored to give the Giants a 35–34 lead, extended to 37–34 when DJ Ware converted the two-point play. Dallas drove down the field and got into position for a Dan Bailey field goal that would have tied the game. Just before he kicked the ball, however, Giants coach Tom Coughlin called timeout, negating Bailey's successful kick. On the retry, Jason Pierre-Paul recorded a blocked field goal by tipping the kick as it was coming up, securing the win and finishing what was a huge night for the second-year defensive end; Pierre-Paul recorded two sacks, a forced fumble (recovered by Deon Grant), and a safety as well. NBC color analyst Cris Collinsworth praised Eli Manning for generating yet another fourth quarter comeback. Manning threw for 400 yards and two touchdowns while Romo recorded 321 yards and four scores. Laurent Robinson caught one of those passes as part of his four-catch, 137-yard day while Hakeem Nicks recorded 154 yards on seven catches. Jacobs scored two rushing touchdowns, while recording his first 100-yard rushing game of the season. This game was ranked #2 on NFL.com's Top 20 Games of 2011, the highest regular season game on the list.

=== Week 15: vs. Washington Redskins ===
Week Fifteen: Washington Redskins at New York Giants – Game summary

Quarter	1	2	3	4	Total
Redskins	3	14	3	3	23
Giants	0	3	0	7	10

at MetLife Stadium, East Rutherford, New Jersey

- Date: December 18
- Game time: 1:00 pm. EST
- Game weather: 29 °F (−2 °C), Sunny
- Game attendance: 78,861
- Referee: Alberto Riveron
- TV announcers (Fox): Joe Buck, Troy Aikman and Pam Oliver

Game information

First quarter

- WAS Graham Gano 36-yard FG (10–52, 5:01) (WAS 3–0)

Second quarter

- WAS Santana Moss 20-yard pass from Grossman (Gano kick) (13–82, 6:52) (WAS 10–0)
- WAS Darrel Young 6-yard run (Gano kick) (9–41, 4:42) (WAS 17–0)
- NYG Tynes 40-yard FG (6–46, 0:58) (WAS 17–3)

Third quarter

- WAS Gano 43-yard FG (4–9, 2:09) (WAS 20–3)

Fourth quarter

- WAS Gano 25-yard FG (10–59, 5:31) (WAS 23–3)
- NYG Bradshaw 3-yard run (Tynes kick) (13–76, 3:30) (WAS 23–10)

Top passers

- WAS – Rex Grossman – 15/24, 185 YDS, TD, 2 INT
- NYG – Eli Manning – 23/40, 257 YDS, 3 INT

Top rushers

- WAS – Roy Helu – 23 CAR, 53 YDS
- NYG – Ahmad Bradshaw – 10 CAR, 58 YDS, TD

Top receivers

- WAS – Jabar Gaffney – 6 REC, 85 YDS
- NYG – Hakeem Nicks – 5 REC, 73 YDS

Top tacklers

- WAS – London Fletcher – 10 TKL, 2 AST
- NYG – Jason Pierre-Paul – 11 TKL, 5 AST, SK

The Giants failed to capitalize on their win from the week before and once again were defeated by the Redskins for the season sweep. Washington never trailed in this game and forced Eli Manning into three interceptions. Although the Giants recorded two off of Rex Grossman, they never were able to get into any sort of offensive groove and lost 23–10. Washington led 17–3 at halftime and never looked back. Grossman threw for 185 yards and a touchdown to Santana Moss. Jabar Gaffney led the Redskins with 85 yards receiving while Hakeem Nicks recorded 73 for the Giants. Manning finished with 257 yards.

This was the first time the Giants were swept by the Redskins since 1999.

=== Week 16: at New York Jets ===
Week Sixteen: New York Giants at New York Jets – Game summary

Quarter	1	2	3	4	Total
Giants	0	10	7	12	29
Jets	7	0	0	7	14

at MetLife Stadium, East Rutherford, New Jersey

- Date: December 24
- Game time: 1:00 pm. EST
- Game weather: 35 °F (2 °C), Sunny
- Game attendance: 79,088
- Referee: Pete Morelli
- TV announcers (Fox): Kenny Albert, Daryl Johnston and Tony Siragusa

Game information

First quarter

- NYJ Josh Baker 5-yard pass from Sanchez (Nick Folk kick) (10–53, 4:42) (NYJ 7–0)

Second quarter

- NYG Tynes 21-yard FG (9–53, 3:20) (NYJ 7–3)
- NYG Cruz 99-yard pass from Manning (Tynes kick) (3–99, 0:25) (NYG 10–7)

Third quarter

- NYG Bradshaw 14-yard run (Tynes kick) (4–81, 1:46) (NYG 17–7)

Fourth quarter

- NYG Tynes 36-yard FG (4–4, 1:28) (NYG 20–7)
- NYJ Sanchez 1-yard run (Folk kick) (4–11, 1:26) (NYG 20–14)
- NYG Chris Canty sacked Sanchez in end zone for a Safety (NYG 22–14)
- NYG Bradshaw 19-yard run (Tynes kick) (1–19, 0:09) (NYG 29–14)

Top passers

- NYG – Eli Manning – 9/27, 225 YDS, TD, INT
- NYJ – Mark Sanchez – 30/59, 258 YDS, TD, 2 INT

Top rushers

- NYG – Ahmad Bradshaw – 15 CAR, 54 YDS, 2 TD
- NYJ – Shonn Greene – 14 CAR, 58 YDS

Top receivers

- NYG – Victor Cruz – 3 REC, 164 YDS, TD
- NYJ – Dustin Keller – 8 REC, 77 YDS

Top tacklers

- NYG – Antrel Rolle – 7 TKL; Corey Webster – 7 TKL
- NYJ – Sione Pouha – 3 TKL, AST; Bart Scott – 3 TKL, 2 AST; Jamaal Westerman – 3 TKL, AST; Muhammad Wilkerson – 3 TKL, 2 AST, SK

This matchup on Christmas Eve against the crosstown rival New York Jets was considered the most important ever. Both teams needed to win their last two games to make the playoffs and Jets coach Rex Ryan, while trying to motivate his players, added fuel to the fire. He publicly claimed the Jets were the better New York team, saying he didn't get hired to be anybody's "little brother." He went on and covered the Giants three Super Bowl logos in the locker room hallway leading up to the game and sent former Giants Super Bowl hero and current Jet Plaxico Burress as the only captain for the coin toss. The Jets scored a touchdown on their opening drive on a Mark Sanchez touchdown pass to fullback Josh Baker, aided by the Giants having 12 men on the field on a 4th down earlier in the drive. Trailing 7–3 in the second quarter and facing 3rd & 10 from their own 1-yard line, Eli Manning threw a short out pass to Victor Cruz. Cruz broke two tackles and then took off for the end zone, outrunning the remaining Jet defenders on his way to a record-tying 99-yard touchdown reception and a 10–7 lead which the Giants never looked back from. Ahmad Bradshaw had a punishing touchdown run near the end of the third quarter. Down 20–14 and with an opportunity to march down the field to take the lead, Chris Canty forced an intentional grounding penalty in the endzone on Sanchez resulting in a safety. Bradshaw had a 19-yard touchdown run on the next play to seal the 29–14 victory and set up a winner-take-all season finale against the Cowboys. Manning recorded 225 yards and a touchdown, while Cruz's three receptions garnered him 164 of those. Sanchez threw a career-high 59 passes for 258 yards and two total touchdowns but was intercepted twice and Dustin Keller led all receivers with eight receptions.

=== Week 17: vs. Dallas Cowboys ===
Week Seventeen: Dallas Cowboys at New York Giants – Game summary

Quarter	1	2	3	4	Total
Cowboys	0	0	7	7	14
Giants	7	14	0	10	31

at MetLife Stadium, East Rutherford, New Jersey

- Date: January 1
- Game time: 8:20 pm. EST
- Game weather: 48 °F (9 °C), Rain Showers
- Game attendance: 81,077
- Referee: Walt Anderson
- TV announcers (NBC): Al Michaels, Chris Collinsworth and Michele Tafoya

Game information

First quarter

- NYG Cruz 74-yard pass from Manning (Tynes kick) (6–96, 2:49) (NYG 7–0)

Second quarter

- NYG Bradshaw 5-yard run (Tynes kick) (10–68, 4:27) (NYG 14–0)
- NYG Bradshaw 10-yard pass from Manning (Tynes kick) (8–80, 3:24) (NYG 21–0)

Third quarter

- DAL Robinson 34-yard pass from Romo (Bailey kick) (9–94, 4:28) (NYG 21–7)

Fourth quarter

- DAL Robinson 6-yard pass from Romo (Bailey kick) (3–26, 1:25) (NYG 21–14)
- NYG Tynes 28-yard FG (9–65, 4:30) (NYG 24–14)
- NYG Nicks 4-yard pass from Manning (Tynes kick) (4–45, 1:14) (NYG 31–14)

Top passers

- DAL – Tony Romo – 29/37, 289 YDS, 2 TD, INT
- NYG – Eli Manning – 24/33, 346 YDS, 3 TD

Top rushers

- DAL – Felix Jones – 11 CAR, 30 YDS
- NYG – Ahmad Bradshaw – 16 CAR, 57 YDS, TD

Top receivers

- DAL – Dez Bryant – 6 REC, 70 YDS
- NYG – Victor Cruz – 6 REC, 178 YDS, TD

Top tacklers

- DAL – Sean Lee – 8 TKL, 3 AST
- NYG – Michael Boley – 7 TKL, 2 AST

With the NFC East title on the line the Giants-Cowboys game was moved to Sunday night, marking the first time in the history of prime-time television that both meetings between division rivals were played on the showcase game of the week. The Giants finished off the Cowboys to record the season sweep and win the division. This time, the Giants got out to a 21–0 halftime advantage on a 74-yard hookup from Eli Manning to Victor Cruz and two touchdowns from Ahmad Bradshaw. The Cowboys rallied to within a touchdown when Tony Romo found Laurent Robinson for a second time in the game, but the Giants put the game away with clutch 4th quarter play from Manning and put the nail in the coffin with a 4-yard touchdown pass to Hakeem Nicks, his fifteenth 4th quarter pass of the season, an NFL record. Manning finished with 346 yards and three touchdowns, finishing with a career-high 4,933 passing yards and 29 touchdown passes. Cruz again had a huge game with 178 receiving yards and a touchdown, finishing with 1,536 yards, a franchise record, and nine touchdowns.

== Playoffs ==
=== Schedule ===
Playoff Round	Date	Opponent (seed)	Result	Record	Game Site	NFL.com recap
Wild Card	January 8, 2012	Atlanta Falcons (5)	W 24–2	1–0	MetLife Stadium	Recap
Divisional	January 15, 2012	at Green Bay Packers (1)	W 37–20	2–0	Lambeau Field	Recap
NFC Championship	January 22, 2012	at San Francisco 49ers (2)	W 20–17 (OT)	3–0	Candlestick Park	Recap
Super Bowl XLVI	February 5, 2012	vs. New England Patriots (A1)	W 21–17	4–0	Lucas Oil Stadium	Recap

=== NFC Wild Card Game: vs. (5) Atlanta Falcons ===
NFC Wild Card Game: Atlanta Falcons at New York Giants – Game summary

Quarter	1	2	3	4	Total
Falcons	0	2	0	0	2
Giants	0	7	10	7	24

at MetLife Stadium, East Rutherford, New Jersey

- Date: January 8
- Game time: 1:00 pm. EST
- Game weather: 44 °F (7 °C), Partly Cloudy
- Game attendance: 79,909
- Referee: Carl Cheffers
- TV announcers (Fox): Joe Buck, Troy Aikman, Pam Oliver and Chris Myers

Game information

Second quarter

- ATL Intentional Grounding Penalty on Manning in end zone for a Safety (ATL 2–0)
- NYG Nicks 4-yard pass from Manning (Tynes kick) (13–85, 7:32) (NYG 7–2)

Third quarter

- NYG Tynes 22-yard field goal (11–72, 4:47) (NYG 10–2)
- NYG Nicks 72-yard pass from Manning (Tynes kick) (3–79, 1:32) (NYG 17–2)

Fourth quarter

- NYG Manningham 27-yard pass from Manning (Tynes kick) (10–85, 5:38) (NYG 24–2)

Top passers

- ATL – Matt Ryan – 24/41, 199 YDS
- NYG – Eli Manning – 23/32, 277 YDS, 3 TD

Top rushers

- ATL – Michael Turner – 15 CAR, 41 YDS
- NYG – Brandon Jacobs – 14 CAR, 92 YDS

Top receivers

- ATL – Julio Jones – 7 REC, 64 YDS
- NYG – Hakeem Nicks – 6 REC, 115 YDS, 2 TD

Top tacklers

- ATL – Curtis Lofton – 9 TKL, 3 AST
- NYG – Antrel Rolle – 6 TKL, 3 AST; Jason Pierre-Paul – 6 TKL, 2 AST

=== NFC Divisional Game: at (1) Green Bay Packers ===
NFC Divisional Game: New York Giants at Green Bay Packers – Game summary

Quarter	1	2	3	4	Total
Giants	10	10	0	17	37
Packers	3	7	3	7	20

at Lambeau Field, Green Bay, Wisconsin

- Date: January 15
- Game time: 4:30 pm. EST/3:30 pm. CST
- Game weather: 31 °F (−1 °C), Sunny
- Game attendance: 72,080
- Referee: Bill Leavy
- TV announcers (Fox): Joe Buck, Troy Aikman, Pam Oliver and Chris Myers

Game information

First quarter

- NYG Tynes 31-yard field goal (13–67, 6:27) (NYG 3–0)
- GB Crosby 47-yard field goal (8–50, 3:00) (Tied 3–3)
- NYG Nicks 66-yard pass from Manning (Tynes kick) (4–80, 1:46) (NYG 10–3)

Second quarter

- GB John Kuhn 8-yard pass from Rodgers (Crosby kick) (9–60, 3:53) (Tied 10–10)
- NYG Tynes 23-yard field goal (5–29, 1:46) (NYG 13–10)
- NYG Nicks 37-yard pass from Manning (Tynes kick) (4–69, 0:41) (NYG 20–10)

Third quarter

- GB Crosby 35-yard field goal (10–58, 4:58) (NYG 20–13)

Fourth quarter

- NYG Tynes 35-yard field goal (10–38, 5:06) (NYG 23–13)
- NYG Manningham 4-yard pass from Manning (Tynes kick) (1–4, 0:05) (NYG 30–13)
- GB Driver 16-yard pass from Rodgers (Crosby kick) (8–76, 2:02) (NYG 30–20)
- NYG Jacobs 14-yard run (Tynes kick) (6–50, 2:10) (NYG 37–20)

Top passers

- NYG – Eli Manning – 21/33, 330 YDS, 3 TD, INT
- GB – Aaron Rodgers – 26/46, 264 YDS, 2 TD, INT

Top rushers

- NYG – Ahmad Bradshaw – 12 CAR, 63 YDS
- GB – Aaron Rodgers – 7 CAR, 66 YDS

Top receivers

- NYG – Hakeem Nicks – 7 REC, 165 YDS, 2 TD
- GB – Donald Driver – 3 REC, 45 YDS, TD

Top tacklers

- NYG – Michael Boley – 8 TKL, AST, 2 SK; Antrel Rolle – 8 TKL
- GB – Charlie Peprah – 9 TKL

=== NFC Championship Game: at (2) San Francisco 49ers ===
NFC Championship Game: New York Giants at San Francisco 49ers – Game summary

Quarter	1	2	3	4	OT	Total
Giants	0	10	0	7	3	20
49ers	7	0	7	3	0	17

at Candlestick Park, San Francisco, California

- Date: January 22
- Game time: 6:30 pm. EST/3:30 pm. PST
- Game weather: 52 °F (11 °C), Rain
- Game attendance: 69,732
- Referee: Ed Hochuli
- TV announcers (Fox): Joe Buck, Troy Aikman, Pam Oliver and Chris Myers

Game information

First quarter

- SF Davis 73-yard pass from Smith (Akers kick) (2–73, 0:13) (SF 7–0)

Second quarter

- NYG Pascoe 6-yard pass from Manning (Tynes kick) (10–69, 4:16) (Tied 7–7)
- NYG Tynes 31-yard FG (10–51, 1:34) (NYG 10–7)

Third quarter

- SF Davis 28-yard pass from Smith (Akers kick) (3–54, 1:30) (SF 14–10)

Fourth quarter

- NYG Manningham 17-yard pass from Manning (Tynes kick) (6–29, 2:34) (NYG 17–14)
- SF Akers 25-yard FG (6–48, 2:55) (Tied 17–17)

Overtime

- NYG Tynes 31-yard FG (5–11, 2:26) (NYG 20–17)

Top passers

- NYG – Eli Manning – 32/58, 316 YDS, 2 TD
- SF – Alex Smith – 12/26, 196 YDS, 2 TD

Top rushers

- NYG – Ahmad Bradshaw – 20 CAR, 74 YDS
- SF – Frank Gore – 16 CAR, 74 YDS

Top receivers

- NYG – Victor Cruz – 10 REC, 142 YDS
- SF – Vernon Davis – 3 REC, 112 YDS, 2 TD

Top tacklers

- NYG – Chase Blackburn – 5 TKL, 2 AST; Jason Pierre-Paul – 5 TKL, AST, 0.5 SK
- SF – Carlos Rogers – 11 TKL

=== Super Bowl XLVI: vs. (A1) New England Patriots ===
Super Bowl XLVI: New York Giants vs. New England Patriots – Game summary

Quarter	1	2	3	4	Total
Giants	9	0	6	6	21
Patriots	0	10	7	0	17

at Lucas Oil Stadium, Indianapolis, Indiana

- Date: February 5
- Game time: 6:30 pm. EST
- Game weather: Played indoors (retractable roof closed)
- Game attendance: 68,658
- Referee: John Parry
- TV announcers (NBC): Al Michaels, Cris Collinsworth, Alex Flanagan and Michele Tafoya

Game information

First quarter

- NYG Intentional Grounding Penalty on Brady in end zone for a Safety (NYG 2–0)
- NYG Cruz 2-yard pass from Manning (Tynes kick) (9–0, 5:23) (NYG 9–0)

Second quarter

- NE Gostkowski 29-yard FG (9–3, 4:32) (NYG 9–3)
- NE Danny Woodhead 4-yard pass from Brady (Gostkowski kick) (10–9, 3:55) (NE 10–9)

Third quarter

- NE Hernandez 12-yard pass from Brady (Gostkowski kick) (17–9, 3:40) (NE 17–9)
- NYG Tynes 38-yard FG (17–12, 4:37) (NE 17–12)
- NYG Tynes 33-yard FG (17–15, 5:01) (NE 17–15)

Fourth quarter

- NYG Bradshaw 6-yard run (run failed) (21–17, 2:49) (NYG 21–17)

Top passers

- NYG – Eli Manning – 30/40, 296 YDS, TD
- NE – Tom Brady – 27/41, 276 YDS, 2 TD, INT

Top rushers

- NYG – Ahmad Bradshaw – 17 CAR, 72 YDS, TD
- NE – BenJarvus Green-Ellis – 10 CAR, 44 YDS

Top receivers

- NYG – Hakeem Nicks – 10 REC, 109 YDS
- NE – Aaron Hernandez – 8 REC, 67 YDS, TD

Top tacklers

- NYG – Michael Boley – 9 TKL, AST
- NE – Brandon Spikes – 8 TKL, 3 AST, FF; Jerod Mayo – 8 TKL, 3 AST, FF

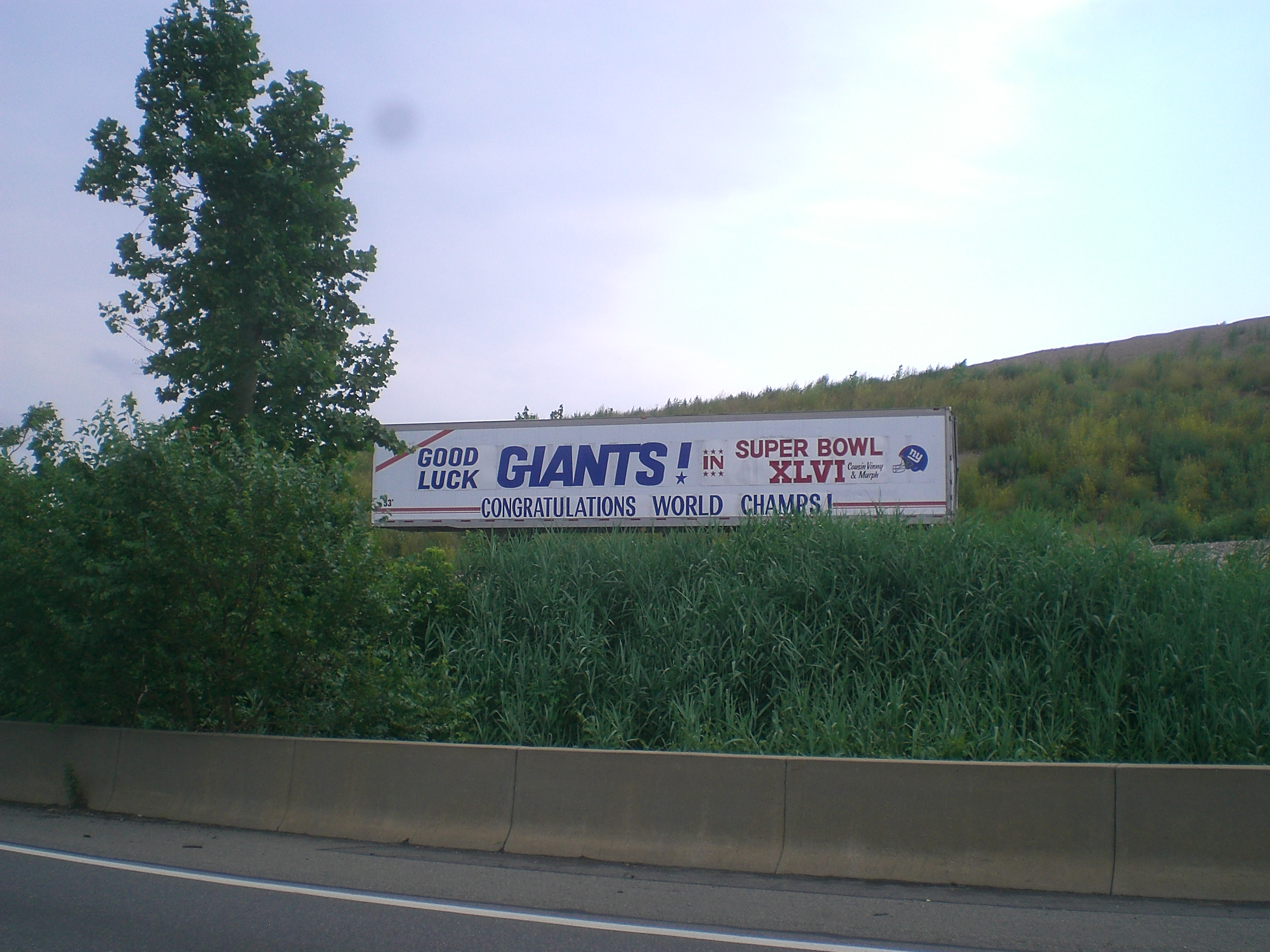
Trailer honoring the Giants for winning the Super Bowl

In winning the Super Bowl, the Giants became the first team to have won Super Bowl games broadcast on all four U.S. national networks (CBS, ABC, Fox, and now NBC), as well as the first team to win Super Bowls in four different decades. The Giants-Patriots game was the 11th time that there was a rematch in a Super Bowl. In doing so, the 2011 Giants became the first team with fewer than 10 wins (9 wins – 7 losses) in the regular season to win a Super Bowl. Furthermore, Super Bowl XLVI marked just the second time in Super Bowl history that opening score of the title game occurred with a safety when Justin Tuck pressured Tom Brady, and he was called for intentional grounding; the first instance was Super Bowl IX, when Pittsburgh registered a safety on Hall of Fame coach Bud Grant's Vikings. Eli Manning won his second Super Bowl MVP award in four years after orchestrating another game-winning touchdown drive in the game's final moments.

== Season facts ==
- This is the fourth time that the Giants played a team that they would later play in the Super Bowl. The Giants are 2–2 in regular season and 4–0 in the Super Bowl in these games.
- The Giants' overall Super Bowl record is 4–1.
- The Giants are 5–0 in NFC Championship Games.
- The Giants scoring defense was the lowest of Super Bowl winners, ranking 25th after allowing an average of 25 points per game.
- Also notable is that the Giants' rushing offense was ranked 32nd (dead last) in the NFL with 1,427 yards, or an average of 89.2 rushing yards per game.
- The Giants finished the regular season with a −6-point differential (394 scored, 400 allowed), the worst differential of any Super Bowl champion.
- With a 9–7 regular-season record, the 2011 Giants were the first, and are the only, sub-10-win team to win the Super Bowl. They are the third 9–7 team to compete in the Super Bowl, with the 1979 Los Angeles Rams and 2008 Arizona Cardinals both falling to the Pittsburgh Steelers in Super Bowls XIV and XLIII.
- The 2011 New York Giants won their first playoff game at home since the 2000 NFC Championship against the Minnesota Vikings during the Wild Card game.
- The 2011 Giants were the first team to win the Super Bowl as the NFC's 4th Seed, with the second being the 2021 Los Angeles Rams. The 2008 Cardinals and 1979 Rams were also 4th seeds when they went to the Super Bowl, but lost.
- When the Giants played the New England Patriots in Super Bowl XLVI, the Patriots were 13–3. The Giants also beat them in Foxborough.
