= Fort Scott Community College =

Community college in Fort Scott, Kansas, US

- Motto: College As It Should Be; Students First, Community Always; Your First Step . . . Or Your Next Step
- Type: Public community college
- Established: 1919
- President: Jack Welch
- Students: 1,464 (fall 2023)
- Location: Fort Scott, Kansas, United States; 37.8153°N 94.7141°W
- Colors: Maroon and grey
- Nickname: Greyhounds
- Sporting affiliations: NJCAA – KJCCC
- Website: fortscott.edu

Fort Scott Community College is a public community college in Fort Scott, Kansas. It has satellite buildings in other cities in Crawford County, including Pittsburg and Frontenac, along with sites in Paola and at the Hillsdale Learning Center.

== History ==
Fort Scott is the oldest community college in Kansas, founded in 1919. (Highland Community College is older, but was not founded as a junior college.)

== Campuses ==
The main campus is in Fort Scott on Horton Street, but there are satellite locations in other cities in Crawford County, including Pittsburg and Frontenac, along with sites in Paola and at Hillsdale, Kansas.

Fort Scott Community College has had a full service outreach center in Paola for more than a decade. Students at the Miami County Campus can take day, evening, weekend, or online classes. In addition, the Miami County Campus also offers counseling services, remedial classes, and workshops. In the newly renovated facility, a community room is also available for public use.

== Academics ==
In fall 2023, the college enrolled 1,464 students. It offers associate degrees, certificates, and technical education.

== Athletics ==
Fort Scott Community College's mascot is Gizmo the Greyhound. The school colors are maroon and gray.

FSCC sponsors volleyball, men's and women's basketball, baseball and softball programs which compete in the Kansas Jayhawk Community College Conference, which is a member of the National Junior College Athletic Association. There are also men's and women's rodeo teams, which compete in the Central Plains Region of the National Intercollegiate Rodeo Association.

Football was dropped by the school during the 2021–2022 academic year due to "the cumulative effect of limited resources, changes in Kansas Jayhawk Community College Conference (KJCCC) football eligibility rules in 2016, and the changing ethos of football in general". Fort Scott's football team won the 1970 NJCAA National Championship and was national-runner up in 1971, 1972 and 2009.

Track and cross-country were dropped by the school prior to the 2010–2011 academic year due to a lack of participation but have since been reinstated.

== Notable people ==
- Davon Coleman, professional football player
- Charlie Cowdrey, college football coach
- Lavonte David, professional football player
- Jermarcus Hardrick, professional football player
- Adam LaRoche, professional baseball player
- John Means, professional baseball player
- Frank Middleton, professional football player
- Jason Pierre-Paul, professional football player
- Jason Sudeikis, actor
- Jacquian Williams, professional football player
- Charles Wright, professional football player
- Brandin Bryant, professional football player
- Khyree Jackson, professional football player
