= Tyrone McKenzie =

American football player and coach (born 1985)

Las Vegas Raiders
- Title: Defensive assistant & linebackers coach

Personal information
- Born: December 11, 1985 (age 40); New York City, New York, U.S.
- Listed height: 6 ft 2 in (1.88 m)
- Listed weight: 245 lb (111 kg)

Career information
- Position: Linebacker (No. 50, 58)
- High school: Riverview (Riverview, Florida)
- College: Michigan State (2004); Iowa State (2005–2006); South Florida (2007–2008)
- NFL draft: 2009: 3rd round, 97th overall pick

Career history

Playing
- New England Patriots (2009–2010); Tampa Bay Buccaneers (2010); Minnesota Vikings (2011–2012)

Coaching
- Los Angeles Rams (2017) Assistant special teams coach; Tennessee Titans (2018–2019) Inside linebackers coach; Detroit Lions (2020) Linebackers coach; Miami Dolphins (2022) Outside linebackers coach; North Carolina (2024) Defensive analyst; Las Vegas Raiders (2025–present) Defensive assistant/linebackers coach

Awards and highlights
- First-team All-Big East (2008); Second-team All-Big East (2007); Second-team All-Big 12 (2006)

Career NFL statistics
- Total tackles: 17
- Stats at Pro Football Reference

Tyrone McKenzie (born December 11, 1985) is an American football coach and former linebacker who serves as a defensive assistant and linebackers coach for the Las Vegas Raiders of the National Football League (NFL). He recently served as a defensive analyst at North Carolina. He was selected by the New England Patriots in the third round of the 2009 NFL draft. He debuted for the Tampa Bay Buccaneers in 2010 and also played for the Minnesota Vikings. He played college football for the South Florida Bulls.

== Early life ==
McKenzie attended Riverview High School where he was a first-team All-Hillsborough County selection by the Tampa Tribune and second-team all-county pick by the St. Petersburg Times as a running back.

== College career ==
=== Michigan State ===
McKenzie played college football at Michigan State in 2004, playing in 11 games as a true freshman, recording three tackles.

=== Iowa State ===
McKenzie transferred to Iowa State after the 2004 season. After sitting out the 2005 season due to NCAA transferring rules, McKenzie earned second-team All-Big 12 Conference after recording 129 tackles, two sacks, four forced fumbles, and an interception in 12 games.

=== South Florida ===
Before the 2007 season, McKenzie transferred to the University of South Florida, receiving a hardship waiver from the NCAA allowing him to play immediately. McKenzie had transferred to be closer to his widowed mother who was injured in a car accident and lost her business; McKenzie worked the overnight shift at a Hampton Inn in order to support her. In 2007, he earned second-team All-Big East honors after setting a school record and team-leading 121 tackles. He also had 1.5 sacks, two forced fumbles, two fumble recoveries and a blocked kick. As a senior in 2008, McKenzie once again led the Bulls in tackles with 116 and earned first-team All-Big East honors. He also had a sack and an interception and set a USF record for tackles over consecutive seasons with 237.

McKenzie finished his college career starting 36 of 49 games, recording 369 tackles, 4.5 sacks, six forced fumbles, two fumble recoveries, 16 pass deflections, two interceptions and a safety.

== Professional career ==
=== Pre-draft ===
Pre-draft measurables
Height	Weight	Arm length	Hand span	40-yard dash	10-yard split	20-yard split	20-yard shuttle	Three-cone drill	Vertical jump	Broad jump	Bench press	Wonderlic
6 ft 1 5/8 in (1.87 m)	243 lb (110 kg)	33 5/8 in (0.85 m)	10 in (0.25 m)	4.78 s	1.61 s	2.78 s	4.28 s	7.31 s	32.5 in (0.83 m)	9 ft 4 in (2.84 m)	27 reps	21
All values from NFL Combine/South Florida's Pro Day

=== New England Patriots ===
McKenzie was selected by the New England Patriots in the third round of the 2009 NFL draft. On May 2, 2009, during rookie minicamp, McKenzie tore the ACL in his right knee after getting tangled up with a running back. He was signed to a four-year contract on August 25 and subsequently placed on injured reserve.

McKenzie was waived on September 5, 2010. He was re-signed to the team's practice squad the next day after clearing waivers. He was released from the practice squad on November 6, 2010.

=== Tampa Bay Buccaneers ===
McKenzie was signed by the Tampa Bay Buccaneers to their practice squad on November 8, 2010. He was promoted to the Buccaneers' active roster on December 14, 2010. He was cut on September 2, 2011.

=== Minnesota Vikings ===
McKenzie was signed to the Vikings practice squad on September 7, 2011. He was named to the active 53-man roster during the final cuts before the start of the 2012 NFL Season. McKenzie was released by the Vikings on August 31, 2013 (along with 18 others) to get to a 53-man roster.

== Coaching career ==
After being an assistant special teams coach for the Los Angeles Rams, McKenzie joined the Tennessee Titans as a linebackers coach in 2018.

=== Detroit Lions ===
McKenzie joined the Detroit Lions as a linebackers coach in 2020. He missed the team's week 16 game against the Tampa Bay Buccaneers due to COVID-19 protocols.

=== Miami Dolphins ===
On January 19, 2023, McKenzie was fired as an outside linebackers coach by the Miami Dolphins.
