= Andrew Barbosa =

Puerto Rican baseball player (born 1987)

Free agent
- Pitcher
- Born: November 18, 1987 (age 38); San Juan, Puerto Rico
- Bats: Right Throws: Left
- Stats at Baseball Reference
Medals
Men's baseball
Representing Puerto Rico
World Baseball Classic
Silver medal – second place	2017 Los Angeles	National team

Andrew Jesus Barbosa (born November 18, 1987) is a Puerto Rican professional baseball pitcher who is a free agent.

== Career ==
Barbosa attended Riverview High School in Riverview, Florida. The San Francisco Giants selected him in the 15th round of the 2006 MLB draft. He did not sign, and instead attended South Florida Community College. He later transferred to the University of South Florida. Barbosa was once more drafted by the Giants in the 15th round of the 2010 MLB draft, but again did not sign with the team.

=== Arizona Diamondbacks ===
Barbosa was drafted by the Arizona Diamondbacks in the 36th round, with the 1,113th overall selection, of the 2012 Major League Baseball draft, and signed. He split his first professional season between the rookie–level Missoula Osprey and Single–A South Bend Silver Hawks. In 15 starts between the two affiliates, Barbosa accumulated a 3–5 record and 3.51 ERA with 88 strikeouts across 74 1/3 innings of work.

He spent the 2013 season with the High–A Visalia Rawhide, making 26 starts and compiling an 11–9 record and 3.81 ERA with 160 strikeouts across 134 2/3 innings pitched. Barbosa returned to Visalia in 2014, also making one start for the rookie–level Arizona League Diamondbacks. In 19 starts for Visalia, he registered a 7–2 record and 3.71 ERA with 117 strikeouts across 87 1/3 innings.

Barbosa began the 2015 season with the Double–A Mobile BayBears. However, after struggling to a 12.72 ERA in three games, he was released by the Diamondbacks organization on April 23, 2015.

=== Long Island Ducks ===
Shortly after his release from the Diamondbacks, Barbosa signed with the Long Island Ducks of the Atlantic League of Professional Baseball. In 9 starts for the Ducks, Barbosa logged a 4–1 record and 2.82 ERA with 59 strikeouts across 51 innings pitched.

=== Atlanta Braves ===
On July 9, 2015, Barbosa's contract was purchased by the Atlanta Braves organization. He made 16 appearances for the Double–A Mississippi Braves, compiling a 5–2 record and 2.68 ERA with 51 strikeouts across 43 2/3 innings. Barbosa elected free agency following the season on November 6.

=== New York Mets ===
On December 16, 2015, Barbosa signed a minor league contract with the New York Mets. He split the 2016 season between the rookie–level Gulf Coast League Mets, High–A St. Lucie Mets, Double–A Binghamton Mets, and Triple–A Las Vegas 51s. In 16 games (15 starts) combined between the four affiliates, Barbosa accumulated a 1.51 ERA with 71 strikeouts across 71 2/3 innings pitched. Barbosa elected free agency following the season on November 7, 2016.

=== Milwaukee Brewers ===
On December 9, 2016, Barbosa signed a minor league contract with the Milwaukee Brewers. In 36 appearances for the Triple–A Colorado Springs SkySox, he logged a 7–3 record and 5.29 ERA with 65 strikeouts across 66 1/3 innings. Barbosa elected free agency following the season on November 6, 2017.

=== Long Island Ducks (second stint) ===
On February 8, 2018, Barbosa signed with the Long Island Ducks of the Atlantic League of Professional Baseball. He made only three starts for the Ducks, recording a 4.91 ERA with 7 strikeouts in 7 1/3 innings.

== International career ==
Barbosa was named as a reserve for the Puerto Rican national baseball team in the 2017 World Baseball Classic.
