= Jason Pierre-Paul =

American football player (born 1989)

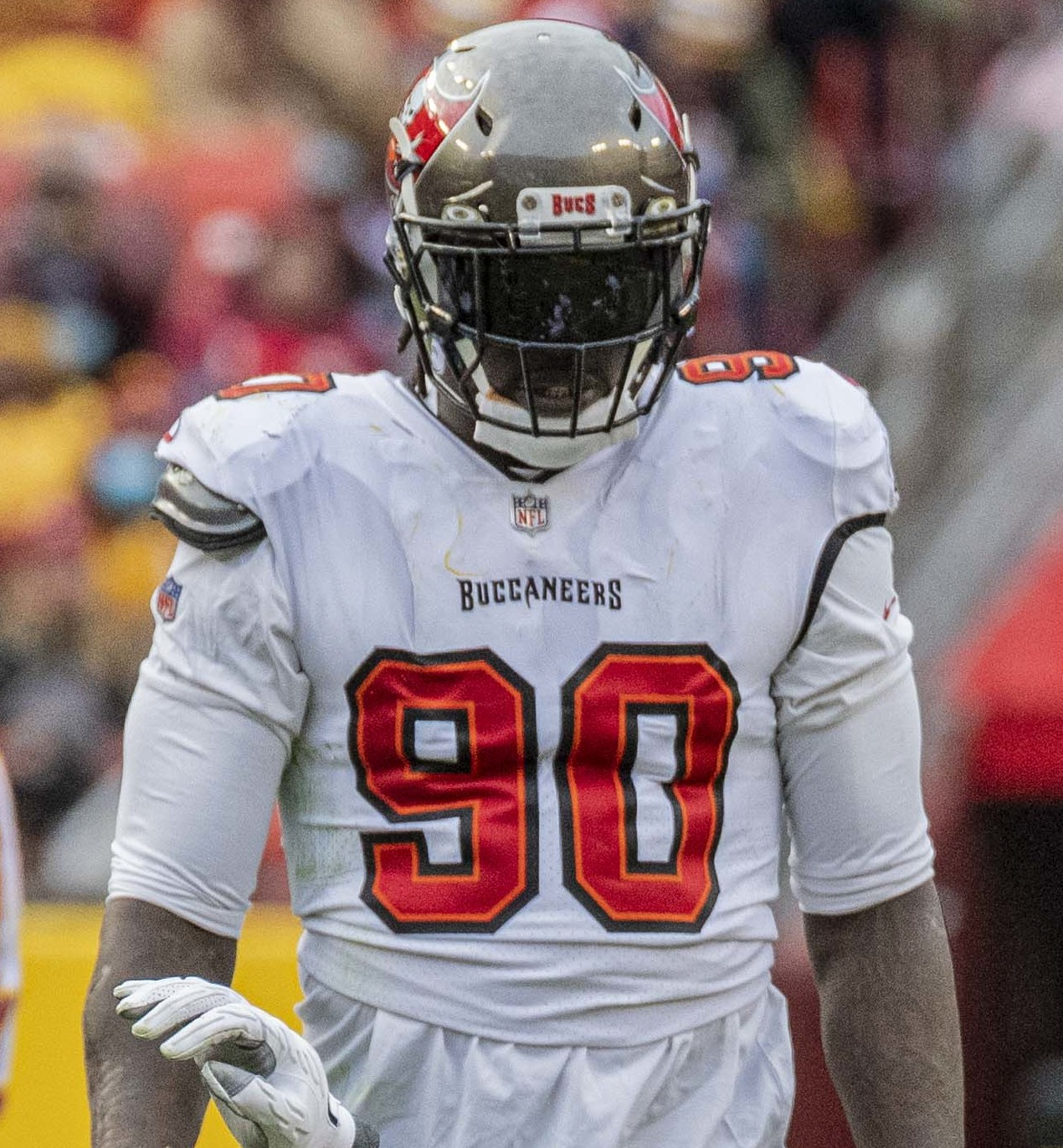
- Pierre-Paul with the Tampa Bay Buccaneers in 2021

Profile
- Position: Linebacker

Personal information
- Born: January 1, 1989 (age 37); Deerfield Beach, Florida, U.S.
- Listed height: 6 ft 5 in (1.96 m)
- Listed weight: 275 lb (125 kg)

Career information
- High school: Deerfield Beach
- College: Canyons (2007); Fort Scott (2008); South Florida (2009)
- NFL draft: 2010: 1st round, 15th overall pick

Career history
- New York Giants (2010–2017); Tampa Bay Buccaneers (2018–2021); Baltimore Ravens (2022); New Orleans Saints (2023); Miami Dolphins (2023); Tampa Bay Buccaneers (2025)

Awards and highlights
- 2× Super Bowl champion (XLVI, LV); First-team All-Pro (2011); 3× Pro Bowl (2011, 2012, 2020); 61st greatest New York Giant of all-time; First-team All-American (2009); First-team All-Big East (2009)

Career NFL statistics as of 2025
- Total tackles: 631
- Sacks: 94.5
- Forced fumbles: 21
- Fumble recoveries: 10
- Pass deflections: 67
- Interceptions: 5
- Defensive touchdowns: 3
- Stats at Pro Football Reference

Jason Andrew Pierre-Paul (born January 1, 1989) is an American professional football linebacker. He played college football for the South Florida Bulls and was selected by the Giants in the first round of the 2010 NFL draft. With the Giants, Pierre-Paul made two Pro Bowls, was first-team All-Pro and won Super Bowl XLVI. With the Buccaneers, he made his third Pro Bowl and won Super Bowl LV.

== Early life ==
Pierre-Paul was born in Deerfield Beach, Florida, to Haitian immigrants Jean and Marie, who arrived in the United States in 1983. At Deerfield Beach High School, Pierre-Paul lettered in basketball for four years. After a serious leg injury while playing basketball, he took up football his junior year.

== College career ==
Pierre-Paul tallied 51 tackles and 19 tackles for a loss in his freshman year at College of the Canyons (California). He also had 14 sacks and earned First-team All-WSC and All-America honors. In 2008, Pierre-Paul played at Fort Scott Community College (Kansas), where his 70 tackles, 10.5 sacks, three forced fumbles, and two fumble recoveries earned him First-team Little All-American honors.

Pierre-Paul transferred to the University of South Florida in Tampa, Florida. In 2009, he played thirteen games for the Bulls with seven starts and totaled 45 tackles (16.5 for losses), 6.5 sacks, one interception (returned 18 yards for a touchdown), broke up three passes, and forced two fumbles. He was named First-team All-America by Pro Football Weekly for his efforts, and was also first-team All Big East. He earned the nickname Haitian Sensation. In the fourth week of the season, he was named the Defensive Lineman Performer of the Week in the College Performance Awards. After his junior year, he decided to forgo his senior season and enter the 2010 NFL draft.

== Professional career ==
Pre-draft measurables
Height	Weight	Arm length	Hand span	40-yard dash	10-yard split	20-yard split	20-yard shuttle	Three-cone drill	Vertical jump	Broad jump	Bench press	Wonderlic
6 ft 4 3/4 in (1.95 m)	270 lb (122 kg)	34 3/4 in (0.88 m)	10 3/8 in (0.26 m)	4.78 s	1.68 s	2.76 s	4.67 s	7.18 s	31.5 in (0.80 m)	9 ft 9 in (2.97 m)	19 reps	15
All values from NFL Combine and Pro Day

=== New York Giants ===
==== 2010 ====
The New York Giants selected Pierre-Paul with the 15th overall pick of the 2010 NFL draft and they signed a five-year, $20.05 million deal with $11.629 million guaranteed. Pierre-Paul made his NFL debut in the Giants' 2010 season opener and recorded two tackles. He played 16 total games that season, with 24 solo tackles and 4.5 sacks. Pro Football Rosters named him to their 2010 All-NFL Draft Team.

==== 2011 ====
With injuries to the Giants' starting defensive ends, Osi Umenyiora and Justin Tuck, Pierre-Paul's playing time increased significantly in 2011, including 12 starts. He finished the season with 65 tackles, 16.5 sacks, one safety, and two forced fumbles. He was also named to his first Pro Bowl despite not having been listed on the ballot and was ranked 24th by his fellow players on the NFL Top 100 Players of 2012.

On December 11, 2011, he had two sacks (one for a safety) and a forced fumble, and he blocked Dan Bailey's 47-yard field goal attempt in the final seconds of a 37–34 defeat of the Dallas Cowboys, becoming the first player in NFL history to record a sack, forced fumble, and blocked field goal in the same game, a performance for which he was named the NFC Defensive Player of the Week. He was named NFC Defensive Player of the Week again in week 16 for his play against the New York Jets.

Pierre-Paul also played a big role in the Giants' playoff run, culminating in their 21-17 defeat of the New England Patriots in Super Bowl XLVI.

==== 2012 ====
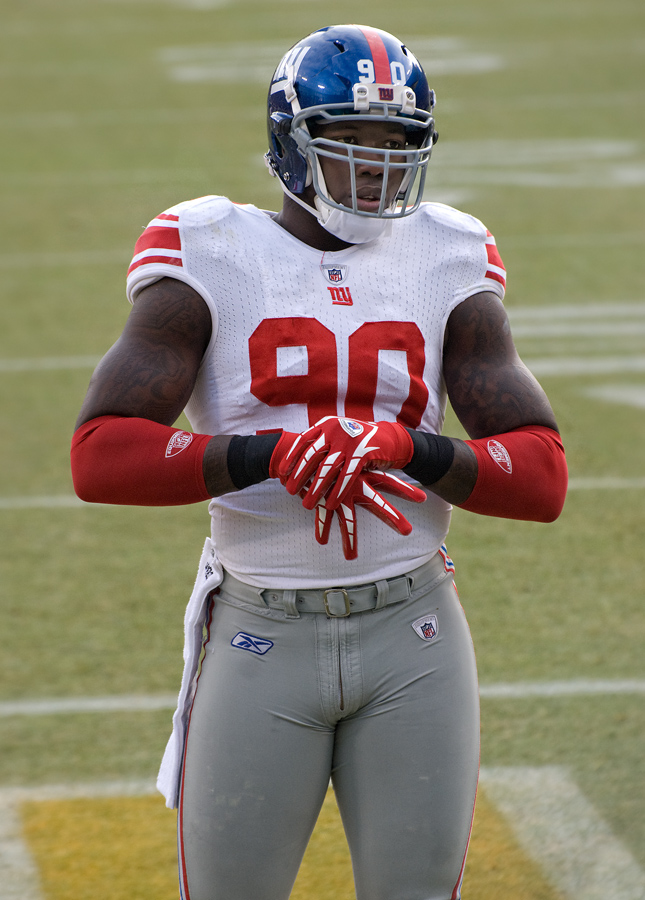
Pierre-Paul in 2012

On October 28, 2012, against the Cowboys in Week 8, Pierre-Paul caught his first career interception and returned it for a touchdown. He finished the 2012 season with 6.5 sacks and 43 total tackles. He was named to the Pro Bowl. He was ranked 55th by his fellow players on the NFL Top 100 Players of 2013.

==== 2013 ====
On June 3, 2013, Pierre-Paul underwent back surgery to remove a herniated disc. He returned for Week 1 for the game against the Cowboys and recorded a solitary sack. Against the Green Bay Packers, he intercepted a pass by Scott Tolzien, which he returned for a touchdown in the 27–13 victory. For his game against the Packers, Pierre-Paul earned NFC Defensive Player of the Week.

==== 2014 ====
Pierre-Paul finished the season with 12.5 sacks, 77 tackles, three forced fumbles, and six passes defended.

==== 2015 ====
On March 3, 2015, the Giants placed the franchise tag on Pierre-Paul. Reports indicated that the tag was non-exclusive, which meant that Pierre-Paul could negotiate with other teams, and the Giants had the right to match any offer or receive two first-round picks as compensation. On July 4, 2015, Pierre-Paul sustained a serious hand injury in a fireworks accident at his home after detonating a firework in his hand, losing a significant portion of his finger. Four days later he had his right index finger amputated. He signed a one-year deal with the team on October 27. He was placed on the Giants' active roster on November 7. Pierre-Paul lost substantial weight in the hospital following the injury and had to play the season with a "monstrous padded club" on his injured hand, both of which adversely affected his play.

==== 2016 ====
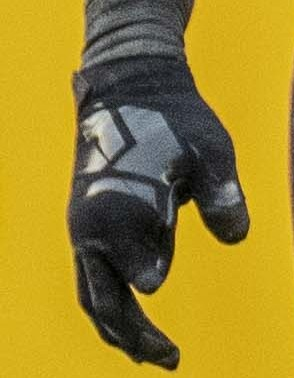
Pierre-Paul's gloved right hand in 2021, six years after his index finger was amputated

On March 8, 2016, Pierre-Paul declined an offer from the Arizona Cardinals, electing to remain with the Giants. He underwent further surgery on his hand in the off-season, allowing him to wear a glove instead of the cumbersome club he had worn in 2015. In Week 12, in a 27-13 defeat of the Cleveland Browns, he registered three sacks and returned a fumble 43 yards for his third career touchdown - a performance for which he was named NFC Defensive Player of the Week. On December 7, he underwent surgery for a sports hernia. Expected to miss the next six weeks, Pierre-Paul would not play again that season, as the Giants eventually lost to the Packers 38–13 in the Wild Card Round of the playoffs.

==== 2017 ====
On February 27, 2017, the Giants placed the franchise tag on Pierre-Paul for the second time. On March 17, 2017, Pierre-Paul signed a four-year, $62 million contract with the Giants with $40 million guaranteed. Overall, Pierre-Paul finished the 2017 season with 68 total tackles, 8.5 sacks, five passes defended and two forced fumbles.

=== Tampa Bay Buccaneers (first stint) ===
==== 2018 ====
On March 22, 2018, the Giants traded Pierre-Paul to the Tampa Bay Buccaneers for a third round pick (B. J. Hill) in the 2018 NFL draft and a swap of fourth round picks. He started all 16 games, recording 58 combined tackles and a team-leading 12.5 sacks. He was ranked 65th by his fellow players on the NFL Top 100 Players of 2019.

==== 2019 ====
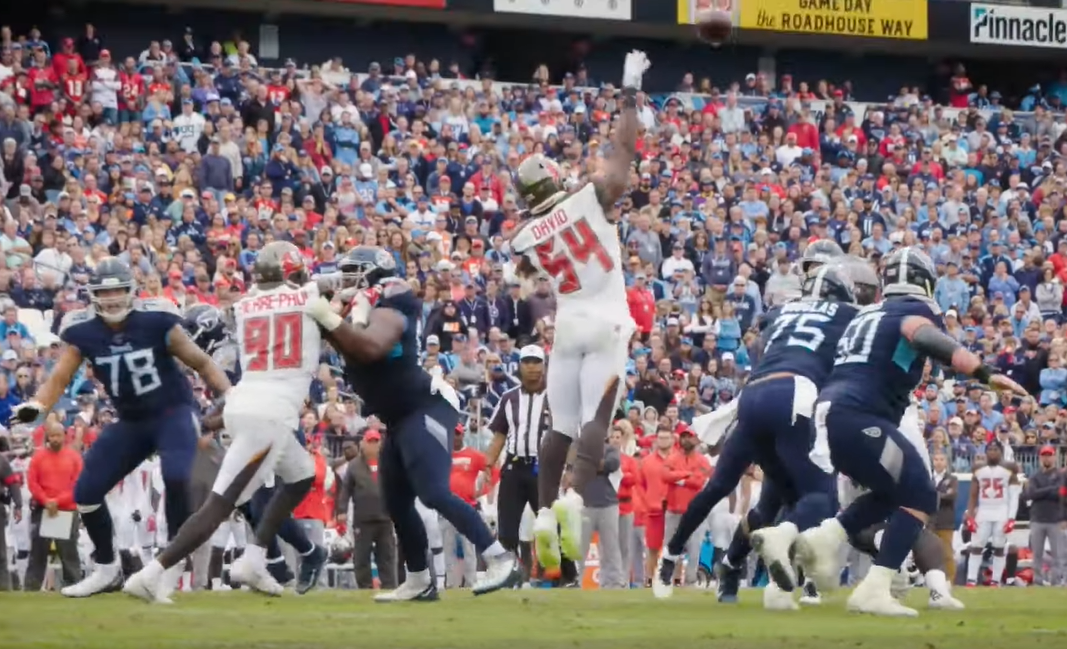
Pierre-Paul in a game against the Tennessee Titans

In May 2019, Pierre-Paul was involved in a single-car accident and experienced a neck fracture due to not wearing a seatbelt that put his season in jeopardy. However, he was cleared for football activities in late August and was placed on the reserve/non-football injury list to start the season. He was activated off NFI on October 26, 2019, prior to Week 8. In Week 12 against the Atlanta Falcons, Pierre-Paul recorded a strip sack on quarterback Matt Ryan which was returned by teammate Ndamukong Suh for an 11-yard touchdown in the 35–22 win. In Week 16 during a 23–20 loss to the Houston Texans, Pierre-Paul sacked quarterback Deshaun Watson three times. In Week 17 against the Falcons, Pierre-Paul sacked Matt Ryan two times, one of which was a strip sack that was recovered by teammate Devin White who returned it for a 91-yard touchdown, during the 28–22 overtime loss. Overall, Pierre-Paul finished the 2019 season with 27 total tackles, 8.5 sacks, two passes defended, and two forced fumbles in ten games.

==== 2020 ====
On March 17, 2020, Pierre-Paul signed a two-year, $27 million contract extension with the Buccaneers.

In Week 1 against the New Orleans Saints, Pierre-Paul recorded his first sack of the season on Drew Brees during the 34–23 loss. In the following week's game against the Carolina Panthers, Pierre-Paul sacked Teddy Bridgewater once and recovered a fumble forced by teammate Antoine Winfield Jr. on Bridgewater during the 31–17 win. In Week 6 against the Packers, Pierre-Paul recorded 1.5 sacks and a forced fumble during the 38–10 win. In Week 10 against the Panthers, Pierre-Paul sacked Teddy Bridgewater once and intercepted a pass thrown by Bridgewater during the 46–23 win. This was Pierre-Paul's first interception since the 2013 season. In Week 11, during a 27–24 loss to the Los Angeles Rams, Pierre-Paul recorded six total tackles, two pass deflections, and an interception. In Week 15, during a 26–14 win against the Minnesota Vikings, Pierre-Paul record two total tackles as well as strip-sack on Kirk Cousins which Pierre-Paul recovered. On December 21, Pierre-Paul was selected to the Pro Bowl. This would mark Pierre-Paul's first Pro Bowl selection as a Buccaneer as well as his first selection since 2012.

Pierre-Paul finished the 2020 regular season with 55 total tackles, a team-best 9.5 sacks, four forced fumbles, two fumble recoveries, six pass deflections, and two interceptions. In the NFC Championship against the Packers, Pierre-Paul recorded two sacks on Aaron Rodgers during the 31–26 win. The Buccaneers would go on to defeat the Kansas City Chiefs 31–9 and win Super Bowl LV in their own stadium, Raymond James Stadium, avenging an earlier loss to the Chiefs in the regular season. Pierre-Paul earned his second Super Bowl title in the win. He was ranked 59th by his fellow players on the NFL Top 100 Players of 2021.

==== 2021 ====
Pierre-Paul's production would drop considerably in 2021 as he dealt with a nagging torn rotator cuff injury for most of the season, which would require surgery after the season. He missed Weeks 3–4 and 16–18 during the season as well. He finished the regular season with only 2.5 sacks, 31 tackles, and one forced fumble.

=== Baltimore Ravens ===
On September 26, 2022, Pierre-Paul signed a one-year deal with the Baltimore Ravens.

=== New Orleans Saints ===
On November 15, 2023, the Saints signed Pierre-Paul to their practice squad. Pierre-Paul's only appearance for the Saints came in Week 12 against the Atlanta Falcons, where he played 17 defensive snaps and recorded two combined tackles.

=== Miami Dolphins ===
On November 28, 2023, the Miami Dolphins signed Pierre-Paul off the Saints practice squad. In two appearances for Miami, he failed to record a stat, playing 13 total snaps split between defense and special teams. Pierre-Paul was waived by the Dolphins on December 19.

=== Tampa Bay Buccaneers (second stint) ===
On December 9, 2025, Pierre-Paul signed with the Tampa Bay Buccaneers' practice squad after over a year away from football. He was elevated to the active roster three times.

== NFL career statistics ==
Legend
	Won the Super Bowl
	Led the league
**Bold**	Career high

=== Regular season ===
Year	Team	Games		Tackles					Interceptions					Fumbles			
Year	Team	GP	GS	Cmb	Solo	Ast	Sck	Sfty	Int	Yds	Lng	TD	PD	FF	FR	Yds	TD
2010	NYG	16	0	30	25	5	4.5	0	—	—	—	—	6	2	**2**	0	0
2011	NYG	16	12	**86**	**66**	21	**16.5**	**1**	—	—	—	—	7	2	0	0	0
2012	NYG	16	15	66	43	**23**	6.5	0	1	**28**	**28T**	**1**	5	1	1	10	0
2013	NYG	11	6	27	20	7	2.0	0	1	24	24T	**1**	4	—	—	—	—
2014	NYG	16	16	77	54	**23**	12.5	0	—	—	—	—	6	3	1	0	0
2015	NYG	8	8	26	21	5	1.0	0	—	—	—	—	6	0	**2**	0	0
2016	NYG	12	12	53	35	18	7.0	0	—	—	—	—	**8**	3	1	**43**	**1**
2017	NYG	16	16	68	48	20	8.5	0	—	—	—	—	5	2	0	0	0
2018	TB	16	16	58	48	10	12.5	0	—	—	—	—	2	1	1	0	0
2019	TB	10	8	30	24	6	8.5	0	—	—	—	—	2	2	0	0	0
2020	TB	16	16	55	34	21	9.5	0	**2**	15	15	0	6	**4**	**2**	6	0
2021	TB	12	12	31	20	11	2.5	0	—	—	—	—	4	1	0	0	0
2022	BAL	14	13	26	17	9	3.0	0	1	3	3	0	5	—	—	—	—
2023	NO	1	0	2	1	1	0.0	0	—	—	—	—	0	—	—	—	—
2023	MIA	2	0	0	0	0	0.0	0	—	—	—	—	0	—	—	—	—
2025	TB	3	0	0	0	0	0.0	0	—	—	—	—	1	—	—	—	—
Career		185	150	631	456	175	94.5	1	5	70	28T	2	67	21	10	53	1

=== Postseason ===
Year	Team	Games		Tackles					Interceptions					Fumbles			
Year	Team	GP	GS	Cmb	Solo	Ast	Sck	Sfty	Int	Yds	Lng	TD	PD	FF	FR	Yds	TD
2011	NYG	4	4	**18**	**15**	**3**	0.5	0	—	—	—	—	**4**	—	—	—	—
2016	NYG	0	0	Did not play due to injury													
2020	TB	4	4	13	10	**3**	**2.0**	0	—	—	—	—	3	—	—	—	—
2021	TB	2	2	2	1	1	0.5	0	—	—	—	—	0	0	**1**	**5**	0
2022	BAL	1	1	1	0	1	0.5	0	—	—	—	—	0	—	—	—	—
Career		11	11	34	26	8	3.5	0	0	0	0	0	7	0	1	5	0

=== Buccaneers franchise records ===
- Most consecutive games with at least 1 sack – 6 (tied with Simeon Rice)
