= 2016 New York Giants season =

92nd season in franchise history

- Owner: John Mara; Steve Tisch
- General manager: Jerry Reese
- Head coach: Ben McAdoo
- Home stadium: MetLife Stadium

Results
- Record: 11–5
- Division place: 2nd NFC East
- Playoffs: Lost Wild Card Playoffs (at Packers) 13–38
- All-Pros: 6: DL Damon Harrison (1st team); S Landon Collins (1st team); WR Odell Beckham Jr. (2nd team); EDGE Olivier Vernon (2nd team); CB Janoris Jenkins (2nd team); DB Dominique Rodgers-Cromartie (2nd team)
- Pro Bowlers: 4: WR Odell Beckham Jr.; SS Landon Collins; ST Dwayne Harris; CB Janoris Jenkins

Uniform
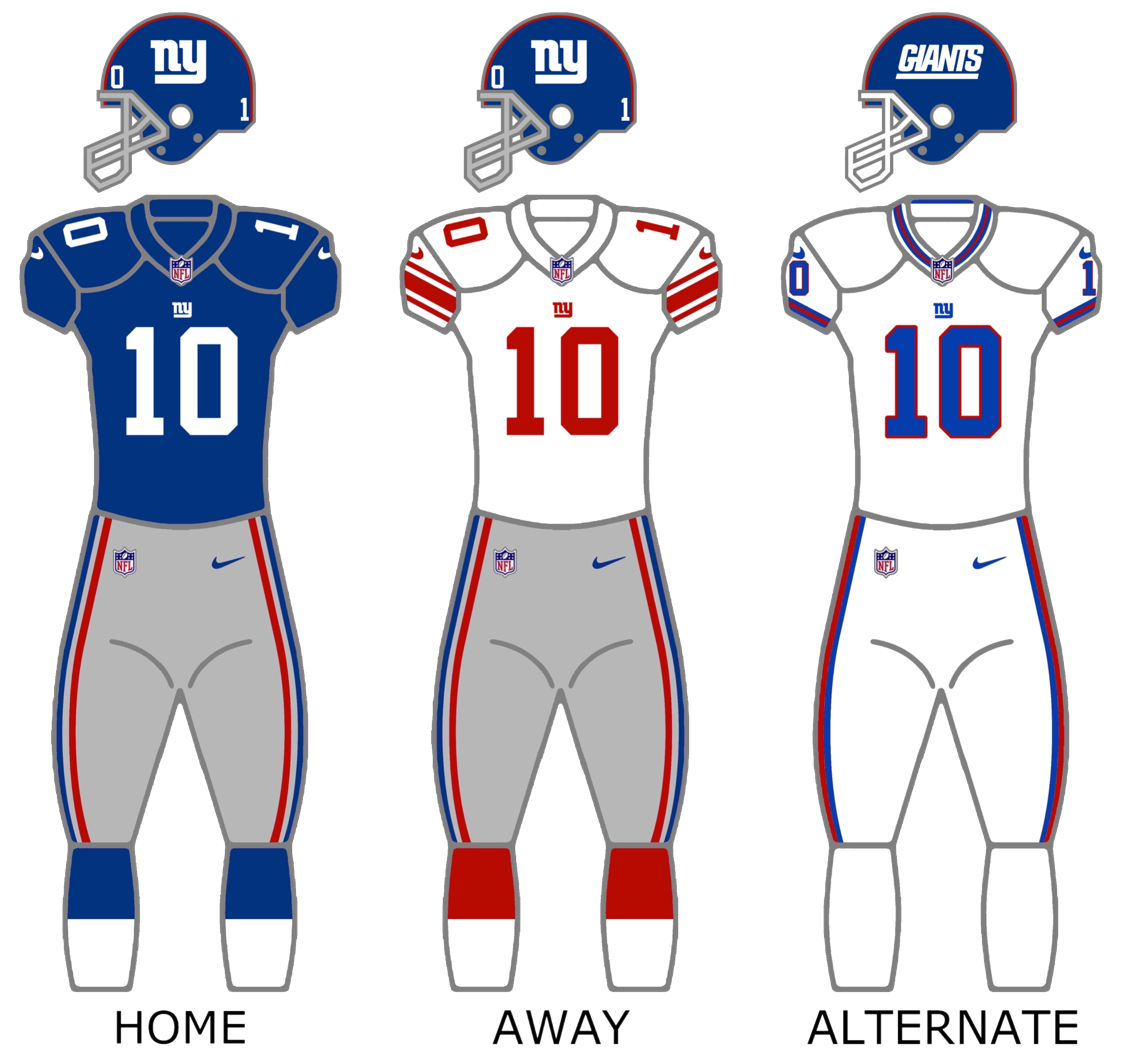

The 2016 season was the New York Giants' 92nd in the National Football League (NFL), their 41st playing at The Meadowlands, their seventh playing at MetLife Stadium and their first under head coach Ben McAdoo.

After losing six games where they had late fourth-quarter leads in 2015, Jerry Reese spent over $200 million in free agency to revitalize their defense. He re-signed Jason Pierre-Paul to a one-year deal and signed Damon Harrison, Olivier Vernon and Janoris Jenkins. Cornerback Eli Apple was drafted with the 10th overall pick in the 2016 NFL draft.

The Giants began 2–0 before falling into a three-game losing streak to the Washington Redskins, Minnesota Vikings and Green Bay Packers. The Giants rebounded and went on a six-game winning streak for the first time since 2010, before falling to the Pittsburgh Steelers in Week 13. The Giants then upset the 11–1 Dallas Cowboys in Week 14 to improve to 9–4. With their Week 14 win over the Cowboys, the Giants clinched a winning season for the first time since 2012 and also swept the Cowboys for the first time since 2011. The Giants got their 10th win of the season in Week 15, having a 10-win season for the first time since 2010. Their 7–1 record at home is their best home record since MetLife Stadium opened in 2010.

Despite losing to the Philadelphia Eagles in Week 16, the Tampa Bay Buccaneers' loss to the New Orleans Saints two days later meant the Giants clinched a playoff trip for the first time since their last Super Bowl season in 2011.

The Giants' first playoff game since Super Bowl XLVI ended in disappointment, as they were upended by the Green Bay Packers 38–13 in the Wild Card round at Lambeau Field. Several media outlets criticized Giants' wide receivers Victor Cruz, Odell Beckham Jr., Sterling Shepard and Roger Lewis after a picture surfaced on social media of the players on vacation on a boat in Miami with singer Trey Songz a week before the playoff game against the Green Bay Packers. Following the loss, the Giants did not make a postseason appearance until 2022. The Giants sent four players to the Pro Bowl and their defense in 2016 was ranked third in the NFL with five All-Pros (the other All-Pro was Odell Beckham Jr.).

== Offseason ==
=== Free agents signed ===
Date	Position	Player	Free agent tag	2015 Team	New Team	Notes
February 18	WR	Anthony Dablé	Rookie	Argonautes (France)	New York Giants	
March 8	DE	Jason Pierre-Paul	UFA	New York Giants	New York Giants	
March 9	CB	Janoris Jenkins	UFA	St. Louis Rams	New York Giants	
March 9	DE	Olivier Vernon	UFA	Miami Dolphins	New York Giants	
March 9	DT	Damon Harrison	UFA	New York Jets	New York Giants	
March 10	LB	Keenan Robinson	UFA	Washington Redskins	New York Giants	
June 17	QB	Logan Thomas	UFA	Miami Dolphins	New York Giants	
August 4	CB	Leon Hall	UFA	Cincinnati Bengals	New York Giants	

Notable Arrival

== Draft ==
2016 New York Giants draft
Round	Pick	Player	Position	College	Notes
1	10	Eli Apple	CB	Ohio State	
2	40	Sterling Shepard	WR	Oklahoma	
3	71	Darian Thompson	S	Boise State	
4	109	B. J. Goodson	LB	Clemson	
5	149	Paul Perkins	RB	UCLA	
6	184	Jerell Adams	TE	South Carolina	
Made roster † Pro Football Hall of Fame * Made at least one Pro Bowl during career

Note

- The Giants conditionally traded their seventh-round selection to the Pittsburgh Steelers in exchange for punter Brad Wing.

== Staff ==
2016 New York Giants staff
Front office: President/CEO – John Mara; Chairman/executive vice president – Steve Tisch; Senior vice president/general manager – Jerry Reese; Senior vice president of player personnel – Chris Mara; Vice president of player evaluation – Marc Ross; Assistant general manager – Kevin Abrams; Director of pro personnel – Ken Sternfeld; Director of player development – David Tyree; Director of football operations/special projects – Martin Mayhew; Head coaches: Head coach – Ben McAdoo; Offensive coaches: Offensive coordinator – Mike Sullivan; Quarterbacks – Frank Cignetti Jr.; Running backs – Craig Johnson; Wide receivers – Adam Henry; Tight ends – Kevin M. Gilbride; Offensive line – Mike Solari; Assistant offensive line – Lunda Wells; Offensive assistant – Ryan Roeder	Defensive coaches: Defensive coordinator – Steve Spagnuolo; Defensive line – Patrick Graham; Assistant defensive line – Jeff Zgonina; Linebackers – Bill McGovern; Secondary/cornerbacks – Tim Walton; Secondary/safeties – Dave Merritt; Defensive assistant – Rob Leonard; Special teams coaches: Special teams coordinator – Tom Quinn; Assistant special teams – Dwayne Stukes; Strength and conditioning: Strength and conditioning – Aaron Wellman; Assistant strength and conditioning – Markus Paul; Performance manager – Joe Danos

== Final roster ==
2016 New York Giants roster
Quarterbacks (QB): 8 Josh Johnson; 10 Eli Manning; Running backs (RB): 23 Rashad Jennings; 28 Paul Perkins; 43 Bobby Rainey; 44 George Winn; Wide receivers (WR): 13 Odell Beckham Jr.; 80 Victor Cruz; 17 Dwayne Harris RS; 15 Tavarres King; 82 Roger Lewis; 87 Sterling Shepard; Tight ends (TE): 89 Jerell Adams; 84 Larry Donnell; 45 Will Tye	Offensive linemen (OL): 65 Will Beatty T; 74 Ereck Flowers T; 68 Bobby Hart T; 77 John Jerry G; 69 Brett Jones G/C; 73 Marshall Newhouse G/T; 67 Justin Pugh G; 70 Weston Richburg C; Defensive linemen (DL): 96 Jay Bromley DT; 95 Johnathan Hankins DT; 98 Damon Harrison DT; 58 Owa Odighizuwa DE; 78 Romeo Okwara DE; 90 Jason Pierre-Paul DE; 99 Robert Thomas DT; 54 Olivier Vernon DE; 72 Kerry Wynn DE	Linebackers (LB): 52 Jonathan Casillas OLB; 93 B. J. Goodson MLB; 94 Mark Herzlich OLB; 59 Devon Kennard OLB; 57 Keenan Robinson OLB; 91 Kelvin Sheppard MLB; 53 Deontae Skinner OLB; 97 Ishaq Williams OLB; Defensive backs (DB): 33 Andrew Adams FS; 24 Eli Apple CB; 29 Nat Berhe FS; 21 Landon Collins SS; 25 Leon Hall CB; 20 Janoris Jenkins CB; 37 Eric Pinkins SS; 41 Dominique Rodgers-Cromartie CB; 30 Coty Sensabaugh CB; 31 Trevin Wade CB; Special teams (ST): 51 Zak DeOssie LS; 5 Robbie Gould K; 9 Brad Wing P	Practice squad: 38 Donte Deayon CB (IR); 60 Adam Gettis G; 75 Jon Halapio C; 48 Jacob Huesman RB; 39 Michael Hunter CB; 71 Stansly Maponga DE; 36 Ryan Murphy SS; 83 Kevin Norwood WR; 86 Darius Powe WR; 19 Keith Wenning QB; 79 Jordan Williams DE; Reserve: 26 Orleans Darkwa RB (IR); 6 Ben Edwards WR (IR); 46 Will Johnson FB (IR); 81 Matt LaCosse TE (IR); 12 Ryan Nassib QB (IR); 55 J. T. Thomas OLB (IR); 27 Darian Thompson FS (IR); 22 Mykkele Thompson FS (IR); 47 Uani 'Unga MLB (IR); 34 Shane Vereen RB (IR); 49 Nikita Whitlock FB (IR); Rookies in italics 53 active, 12 reserve, 10 practice squad

== Schedule ==
=== Preseason ===
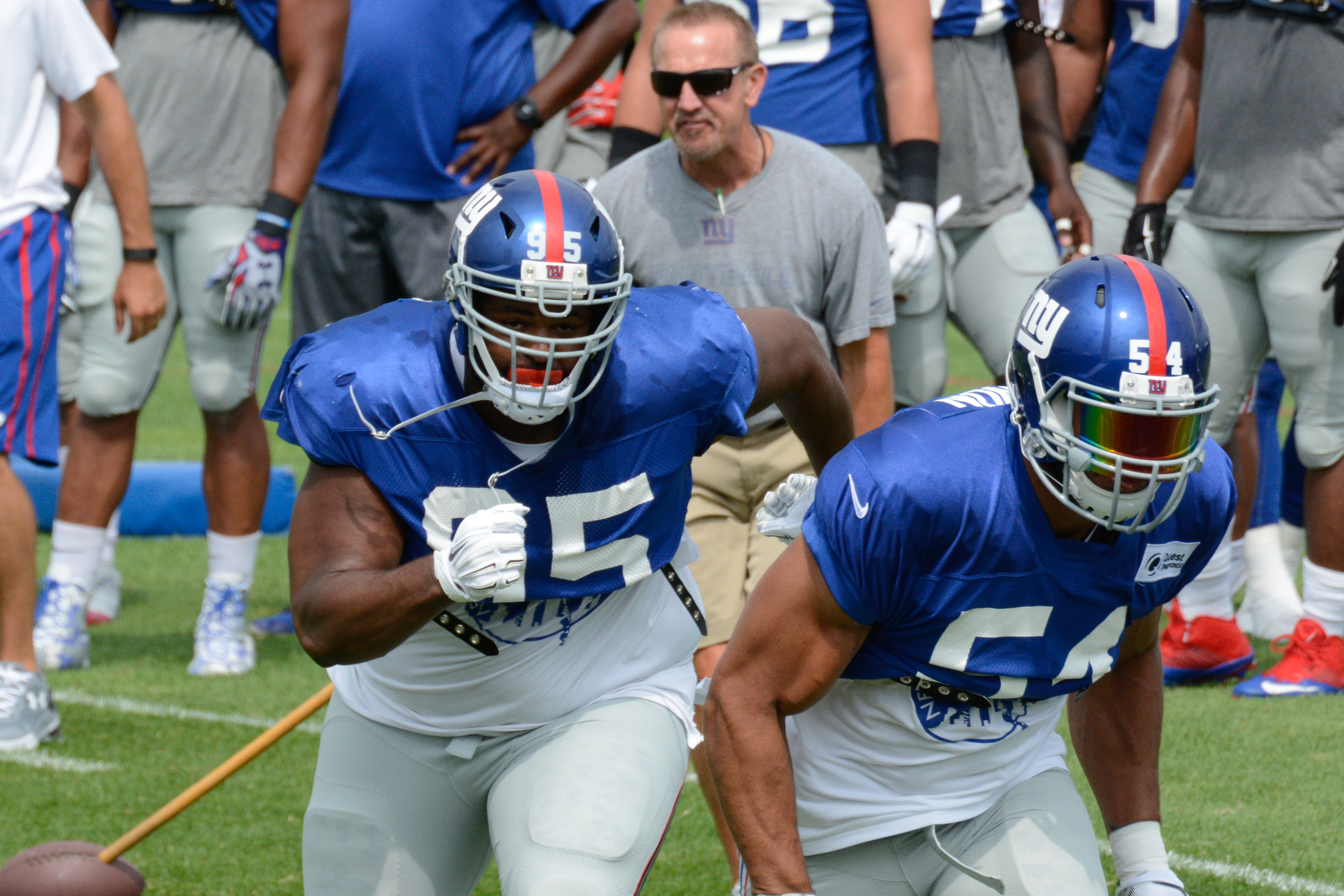
Giants players at training camp

Week	Date	Opponent	Result	Record	Venue	Recap
1	August 12	Miami Dolphins	**L** 10–27	0–1	MetLife Stadium	Recap
2	August 20	at Buffalo Bills	**L** 0–21	0–2	New Era Field	Recap
3	August 27	at New York Jets	**W** 21–20	1–2	MetLife Stadium	Recap
4	September 1	New England Patriots	**W** 17–9	2–2	MetLife Stadium	Recap

=== Regular season ===
Week	Date	Opponent	Result	Record	Venue	Recap
1	September 11	at **Dallas Cowboys**	**W** 20–19	1–0	AT&T Stadium	Recap
2	September 18	New Orleans Saints	**W** 16–13	2–0	MetLife Stadium	Recap
3	September 25	**Washington Redskins**	**L** 27–29	2–1	MetLife Stadium	Recap
4	October 3	at Minnesota Vikings	**L** 10–24	2–2	U.S. Bank Stadium	Recap
5	October 9	at Green Bay Packers	**L** 16–23	2–3	Lambeau Field	Recap
6	October 16	Baltimore Ravens	**W** 27–23	3–3	MetLife Stadium	Recap
7	October 23	at Los Angeles Rams	**W** 17–10	4–3	(United Kingdom) Twickenham Stadium (London)	Recap
8	Bye					
9	November 6	**Philadelphia Eagles**	**W** 28–23	5–3	MetLife Stadium	Recap
10	November 14	Cincinnati Bengals	**W** 21–20	6–3	MetLife Stadium	Recap
11	November 20	Chicago Bears	**W** 22–16	7–3	MetLife Stadium	Recap
12	November 27	at Cleveland Browns	**W** 27–13	8–3	FirstEnergy Stadium	Recap
13	December 4	at Pittsburgh Steelers	**L** 14–24	8–4	Heinz Field	Recap
14	December 11	**Dallas Cowboys**	**W** 10–7	9–4	MetLife Stadium	Recap
15	December 18	Detroit Lions	**W** 17–6	10–4	MetLife Stadium	Recap
16	December 22	at **Philadelphia Eagles**	**L** 19–24	10–5	Lincoln Financial Field	Recap
17	January 1	at **Washington Redskins**	**W** 19–10	11–5	FedExField	Recap

Note: Intra-division opponents are in bold text.

=== Postseason ===
Round	Date	Opponent	Result	Record	Venue	Recap
Wild Card	January 8, 2017	at Green Bay Packers (4)	**L** 13–38	0–1	Lambeau Field	Recap

== Game summaries ==
=== Regular season ===
==== Week 1: at Dallas Cowboys ====
Week One: New York Giants at Dallas Cowboys – Game summary

Quarter	1	2	3	4	Total
Giants	0	13	0	7	20
Cowboys	3	6	7	3	19

at AT&T Stadium, Arlington, Texas

- Date: September 11
- Game time: 4:25 p.m. EDT/3:25 p.m. CDT
- Game weather: Played indoors (retractable roof closed)
- Game attendance: 92,867
- Referee: Ronald Torbert
- TV announcers (Fox): Joe Buck, Troy Aikman and Erin Andrews
- Recap, Gamebook

Game information

First quarter

- DAL – Dan Bailey 23-yard field goal, 6:35. Cowboys 3–0. Drive: 15 plays, 70 yards, 8:25.

Second quarter

- DAL – Dan Bailey 56-yard field goal, 11:09. Cowboys 6–0. Drive: 15 plays, 52 yards, 7:58.
- NYG – Larry Donnell 15-yard pass from Eli Manning (Randy Bullock kick), 9:36. Giants 7–6. Drive: 4 plays, 75 yards, 1:33.
- DAL – Dan Bailey 25-yard field goal, 4:02. Cowboys 9–7. Drive: 11 plays, 68 yards, 5:34.
- NYG – Sterling Shepard 9-yard pass from Eli Manning (kick failed, wide left), 0:07. Giants 13–9. Drive: 12 plays, 75 yards, 3:55.

Third quarter

- DAL – Ezekiel Elliott 8-yard run (Dan Bailey kick), 10:47. Cowboys 16–13. Drive: 7 plays, 35 yards, 3:27.

Fourth quarter

- DAL – Dan Bailey 54-yard field goal, 13:59. Cowboys 19–13. Drive: 11 plays, 39 yards, 5:01.
- NYG – Victor Cruz 3-yard pass from Eli Manning (Randy Bullock kick), 6:13. Giants 20–19. Drive: 9 plays, 54 yards, 3:59.

Top passers

- NYG – Eli Manning – 19/28, 207 yards, 3 TD, INT
- DAL – Dak Prescott – 25/45, 227 yards

Top rushers

- NYG – Rashad Jennings – 18 rushes, 75 yards
- DAL – Ezekiel Elliott – 20 rushes, 51 yards, TD

Top receivers

- NYG – Odell Beckham Jr. – 4 receptions, 73 yards
- DAL – Jason Witten – 9 receptions, 66 yards

Victor Cruz played his first NFL game in 700 days and the Giants fought hard with rookies Dak Prescott and Ezekiel Elliott in their pro debuts. The Cowboys could only muster 3 field goals in the first half as a Dez Bryant touchdown catch was overturned after review. Giants rookie wide receiver Sterling Shepard caught his first career touchdown pass from Eli Manning giving the Giants a 13–9 halftime lead. Cruz had 4 catches for 34 yards and the game-winning touchdown with 6 minutes to play. On the last play of the game, Cowboys wide receiver Terrance Williams caught a pass that put Dallas near field goal range but chose to stay in bounds to get extra yards. The clock ran out before Prescott could get another play, and the Giants started 1–0 for the first time since 2010.

The Giants won their first game in Dallas since 2012 and Ben McAdoo won his first game as an NFL coach.

As of 2025, this is the most recent time the Giants defeated the Cowboys at AT&T Stadium.

==== Week 2: vs. New Orleans Saints ====
Week Two: New Orleans Saints at New York Giants – Game summary

Quarter	1	2	3	4	Total
Saints	0	3	0	10	13
Giants	0	7	3	6	16

at MetLife Stadium, East Rutherford, New Jersey

- Date: September 18
- Game time: 1:00 pm. EDT
- Game weather: 80 °F (27 °C), mostly cloudy
- Game attendance: 77,727
- Referee: Gene Steratore
- TV announcers (Fox): Kenny Albert, Daryl Johnston and Laura Okmin
- Recap, Gamebook

Game information

First quarter

- No scoring plays

Second quarter

- NYG – Janoris Jenkins 65-yard return of blocked field goal (Josh Brown kick), 2:30. Giants 7–0.
- NO – Wil Lutz 39-yard field goal, 0:07. Giants 7–3. Drive: 11 plays, 54 yards, 2:23.

Third quarter

- NYG – Josh Brown 48-yard field goal, 2:46. Giants 10–3. Drive: 11 plays, 54 yards, 5:58.

Fourth quarter

- NO – Willie Snead IV 17-yard pass from Drew Brees (Wil Lutz kick), 13:45. Tied 10–10. Drive: 9 plays, 74 yards, 4:01.
- NYG – Josh Brown 19-yard field goal, 8:46. Giants 13–10. Drive: 11 plays, 74 yards, 4:59.
- NO – Wil Lutz 45-yard field goal, 2:54. Tied 13–13. Drive: 8 plays, 47 yards, 3:13.
- NYG – Josh Brown 23-yard field goal, 0:00. Giants 16–13. Drive: 11 plays, 70 yards, 2:54.

Top passers

- NO – Drew Brees – 29/44, 263 yards, TD
- NYG – Eli Manning – 32/41, 368 yards

Top rushers

- NO – Mark Ingram II – 9 rushes, 30 yards
- NYG – Shane Vereen – 14 rushes, 42 yards

Top receivers

- NO – Brandin Cooks – 7 receptions, 68 yards
- NYG – Sterling Shepard – 8 receptions, 117 yards

All the fans and media expected another shootout like the 52–49 game the year earlier, but oddly enough, the game was very low scoring as neither offense could capitalize on their opportunities. The Giants led 7–3 at halftime, their only score coming from a field goal blocked by Johnathan Hankins which Janoris Jenkins returned for a touchdown.

Despite a key fumble earlier in the game, the Giants drove down the field and Victor Cruz made the game's decisive catch at the Saints 2-yard line in the final minutes. Josh Brown kicked the game-winning field goal and the Giants improved to 2–0 for the first time since 2009. Eli Manning had 368 passing yards in the win.

==== Week 3: vs. Washington Redskins ====
Week Three: Washington Redskins at New York Giants – Game summary

Quarter	1	2	3	4	Total
Redskins	6	10	7	6	29
Giants	14	7	3	3	27

at MetLife Stadium, East Rutherford, New Jersey

- Date: September 25
- Game time: 1:00 pm. EDT
- Game weather: 67 °F (19 °C), sunny
- Game attendance: 78,368
- Referee: John Hussey
- TV announcers (Fox): Joe Buck, Troy Aikman and Erin Andrews
- Recap, Gamebook

Game information

First quarter

- NYG – Shane Vereen 1-yard run (Josh Brown kick), 12:18. Giants 7–0. Drive: 3 plays, 28 yards, 1:05.
- WAS – Dustin Hopkins 49-yard field goal, 9:35. Giants 7–3. Drive: 7 plays, 29 yards, 2:43.
- NYG – Sterling Shepard 23-yard pass from Eli Manning (Josh Brown kick), 6:10. Giants 14–3. Drive: 8 plays, 75 yards, 3:25.
- WAS – Dustin Hopkins 33-yard field goal, 0:25. Giants 14–6. Drive: 11 plays, 60 yards, 5:45.

Second quarter

- WAS – Dustin Hopkins 45-yard field goal, 8:34. Giants 14–9. Drive: 7 plays, 9 yards, 3:58.
- NYG – Orleans Darkwa 2-yard run (Josh Brown kick), 4:12. Giants 21–9. Drive: 8 plays, 75 yards, 4:22.
- WAS – DeSean Jackson 44-yard pass from Kirk Cousins (Dustin Hopkins kick), 3:40. Giants 21–16. Drive: 2 plays, 75 yards, 0:32.

Third quarter

- WAS – Jamison Crowder 55-yard pass from Kirk Cousins (Dustin Hopkins kick), 9:45. Redskins 23–21. Drive: 3 plays, 50 yards, 1:17.
- NYG – Josh Brown 29-yard field goal, 6:29. Giants 24–23. Drive: 9 plays, 64 yards, 3:16.

Fourth quarter

- WAS – Dustin Hopkins 25-yard field goal, 14:57. Redskins 26–24. Drive: 15 plays, 68 yards, 6:32.
- NYG – Josh Brown 30-yard field goal, 7:53. Giants 27–26. Drive: 9 plays, 58 yards, 3:07.
- WAS – Dustin Hopkins 37-yard field goal, 1:51. Redskins 29–27. Drive: 10 plays, 56 yards, 6:02.

Top passers

- WAS – Kirk Cousins – 21/35, 296 yards, 2 TD
- NYG – Eli Manning – 25/38, 350 yards, TD, 2 INT

Top rushers

- WAS – Matt Jones – 17 rushes, 65 yards
- NYG – Shane Vereen – 11 rushes, 67 yards, TD

Top receivers

- WAS – DeSean Jackson – 5 receptions, 96 yards, TD
- NYG – Odell Beckham Jr. – 7 receptions, 121 yards

This was a highly anticipated game after the Redskins added Josh Norman and would be the first time facing Odell Beckham Jr. since their incident the prior season. After Eli Manning threw an interception early in the fourth quarter, Beckham was seen striking the kicking net in frustration. The Redskins, who were 0–2 this season, picked off Manning again at the last second to seal a 29–27 Washington victory, which stunned MetLife Stadium. This was the Giants' first home loss to the Redskins since 2011.

Center Weston Richburg was ejected in the loss for pushing Norman in the 4th quarter, which proved costly. The push was his second unsportsmanlike conduct penalty, causing an automatic ejection under a new rule that the NFL had implemented in the aftermath of the previous incident between Beckham and Norman.

==== Week 4: at Minnesota Vikings ====
Week Four: New York Giants at Minnesota Vikings – Game summary

Quarter	1	2	3	4	Total
Giants	0	3	0	7	10
Vikings	7	7	3	7	24

at U.S. Bank Stadium, Minneapolis, Minnesota

- Date: October 3
- Game time: 8:30 pm. EDT/7:30 pm. CDT
- Game weather: Played indoors (dome stadium)
- Game attendance: 66,690
- Referee: Brad Allen
- TV announcers (ESPN): Sean McDonough, Jon Gruden and Lisa Salters
- Recap, Gamebook

Game information

First quarter

- MIN – Matt Asiata 1-yard run (Blair Walsh kick), 6:28. Vikings 7–0. Drive: 6 plays, 41 yards, 2:42.

Second quarter

- MIN – Kyle Rudolph 7-yard pass from Sam Bradford (Blair Walsh kick), 7:59. Vikings 14–0. Drive: 9 plays, 65 yards, 4:56.
- NYG – Josh Brown 40-yard field goal, 0:02. Vikings 14–3. Drive: 11 plays, 44 yards, 2:44.

Third quarter

- MIN – Blair Walsh 44-yard field goal, 7:39. Vikings 17–3. Drive: 6 plays, 17 yards, 2:16.

Fourth quarter

- NYG – Orleans Darkwa 1-yard run (Josh Brown kick), 13:38. Vikings 17–10. Drive: 5 plays, 91 yards, 1:47.
- MIN – Jerick McKinnon 4-yard run (Blair Walsh kick), 9:20. Vikings 24–10. Drive: 8 plays, 76 yards, 4:18.

Top passers

- NYG – Eli Manning – 25/45, 261 yards, INT
- MIN – Sam Bradford – 26/36, 262 yards, TD

Top rushers

- NYG – Orleans Darkwa – 12 rushes, 48 yards, TD
- MIN – Jerick McKinnon – 18 rushes, 85 yards, TD

Top receivers

- NYG – Paul Perkins – 2 receptions, 72 yards
- MIN – Charles Johnson – 2 receptions, 70 yards

The Giants lost in Minnesota for the second time in as many seasons and their offense was even more anemic in this contest. Odell Beckham Jr.'s frustrations continued as he was held to 3 receptions for 23 yards.

==== Week 5: at Green Bay Packers ====
Week Five: New York Giants at Green Bay Packers – Game summary

Quarter	1	2	3	4	Total
Giants	0	6	3	7	16
Packers	7	10	0	6	23

at Lambeau Field, Green Bay, Wisconsin

- Date: October 9
- Game time: 8:30 pm. EDT/7:30 pm. CDT
- Game weather: 49 °F (9 °C), clear
- Game attendance: 78,401
- Referee: Ed Hochuli
- TV announcers (NBC): Al Michaels, Cris Collinsworth and Michele Tafoya
- Recap, Gamebook

Game information

First quarter

- GB – Jordy Nelson 2-yard pass from Aaron Rodgers (Mason Crosby kick), 6:23. Packers 7–0. Drive: 16 plays, 75 yards, 8:42.

Second quarter

- NYG – Josh Brown 47-yard field goal, 8:26. Packers 7–3. Drive: 5 plays, 26 yards, 1:24.
- GB – Davante Adams 29-yard pass from Aaron Rodgers (Mason Crosby kick), 6:07. Packers 14–3. Drive: 5 plays, 80 yards, 2:20.
- NYG – Josh Brown 41-yard field goal, 1:55. Packers 14–6. Drive: 5 plays, 17 yards, 1:13.
- GB – Mason Crosby 44-yard field goal, 0:03. Packers 17–6. Drive: 4 plays, 5 yards, 1:15.

Third quarter

- NYG – Josh Brown 30-yard field goal, 5:31. Packers 17–9. Drive: 9 plays, 41 yards, 4:43.

Fourth quarter

- GB – Mason Crosby 33-yard field goal, 13:50. Packers 20–9. Drive: 9 plays, 65 yards, 4:46.
- GB – Mason Crosby 25-yard field goal, 6:42. Packers 23–9. Drive: 13 plays, 73 yards, 6:22.
- NYG – Odell Beckham Jr. 8-yard pass from Eli Manning (Josh Brown kick), 3:03. Packers 23–16. Drive: 10 plays, 63 yards, 3:45.

Top passers

- NYG – Eli Manning – 18/35, 199 yards, 1 TD
- GB – Aaron Rodgers – 23/45, 259 yards, 2 TD, 2 INT

Top rushers

- NYG – Bobby Rainey – 5 rushes, 22 yards
- GB – Eddie Lacy – 11 rushes, 81 yards

Top receivers

- NYG – Odell Beckham Jr. – 5 receptions, 56 yards, 1 TD
- GB – Randall Cobb – 9 receptions, 108 yards

This was the first time the Giants returned to Lambeau Field since their victory over the Packers in the Divisional Round of the 2011 Playoffs. The Packers offense dominated the time of possession but Janoris Jenkins had two interceptions on Aaron Rodgers and he made several other key plays keeping the struggling Giants offense in the game. Eli Manning was held in check with one touchdown late in the 4th quarter and 199 yards, and the Giants running backs were only able to rush for 43 yards in 15 attempts. At this point in the season, the Giants offense ranked 27th in total scoring.

==== Week 6: vs. Baltimore Ravens ====
Week Six: Baltimore Ravens at New York Giants – Game summary

Quarter	1	2	3	4	Total
Ravens	10	0	3	10	23
Giants	0	7	10	10	27

at MetLife Stadium, East Rutherford, New Jersey

- Date: October 16
- Game time: 1:00 pm. EDT
- Game weather: 66 °F (19 °C), partly cloudy
- Game attendance: 78,487
- Referee: Jeff Triplette
- TV announcers (CBS): Greg Gumbel, Trent Green and Jamie Erdahl
- Recap, Gamebook

Game information

First quarter

- BAL – Justin Tucker 23-yard field goal, 10:10. Ravens 3–0. Drive: 10 plays, 70 yards, 4:50.
- BAL – Terrance West 1-yard run (Justin Tucker kick), 6:42. Ravens 10–0. Drive: 6 plays, 30 yards, 3:21.

Second quarter

- NYG – Roger Lewis 24-yard pass from Eli Manning (Josh Brown kick), 2:28. Ravens 10–7. Drive: 13 plays, 80 yards, 4:40.

Third quarter

- NYG – Josh Brown 21-yard field goal, 9:48. Tied 10–10. Drive: 15 plays, 72 yards, 5:12.
- BAL – Justin Tucker 39-yard field goal, 2:22. Ravens 13–10. Drive: 4 plays, 6 yards, 2:14.
- NYG – Odell Beckham Jr. 75-yard pass from Eli Manning (Josh Brown kick), 2:10. Giants 17–13. Drive: 1 play, 75 yards, 0:12.

Fourth quarter

- BAL – Justin Tucker 35-yard field goal, 9:14. Giants 17–16. Drive: 7 plays, 56 yards, 2:28.
- NYG – Josh Brown 31-yard field goal, 5:54. Giants 20–16. Drive: 7 plays, 61 yards, 3:20.
- BAL – Terrance West 2-yard run (Justin Tucker kick), 2:04. Ravens 23–20. Drive: 9 plays, 75 yards, 3:50.
- NYG – Odell Beckham Jr. 66-yard pass from Eli Manning (Josh Brown kick), 1:24. Giants 27–23. Drive: 4 plays, 75 yards, 0:40.

Top passers

- BAL – Joe Flacco – 26/48, 307 yards
- NYG – Eli Manning – 32/46, 403 yards, 3 TD, 2 INT

Top rushers

- BAL – Terrance West – 23 rushes, 87 yards, 2 TD
- NYG – Rashad Jennings – 9 rushes, 15 yards

Top receivers

- BAL – Mike Wallace – 4 receptions, 97 yards
- NYG – Odell Beckham Jr. – 8 receptions, 222 yards, 2 TD

Hoping to stop a three-game losing streak, the Giants hosted the Baltimore Ravens in a rematch of their 33–14 loss in 2012. Eli Manning threw his 300th career touchdown to Roger Lewis late in the second quarter. The Giants offense found their footing in the third quarter and their defense had a goal line stand to start the 4th quarter. Late in the 4th quarter, the Ravens drove down the field and scored making the game 23–20. Eli Manning and the Giants responded with a 66-yard touchdown pass to Odell Beckham Jr. – his second touchdown of the game (both from 65+ yards) to make the score 27–23. The Ravens threw up a Hail Mary but was stopped and the Giants ended their three-game losing streak. The Giants improved to 3–3 and became the third NFL team to win 700 games (including postseason). This game started a six-game winning streak for the Giants that would last until Week 13.

==== Week 7: at Los Angeles Rams ====
NFL International Series

Week Seven: New York Giants at Los Angeles Rams – Game summary

Quarter	1	2	3	4	Total
Giants	0	10	0	7	17
Rams	10	0	0	0	10

at Twickenham Stadium, London, United Kingdom

- Date: October 23
- Game time: 2:30 p.m. BST/9:30 am. EDT
- Game weather: 55 °F (13 °C), sunny intervals
- Game attendance: 74,121
- Referee: Ronald Torbert
- TV announcers (NFLN): Kevin Harlan, Dan Fouts and Stacey Dales
- Recap, Gamebook

Game information

First quarter

- LA – Tavon Austin 10-yard pass from Case Keenum (Greg Zuerlein kick), 11:15. Rams 7–0. Drive: 7 plays, 35 yards, 3:10.
- LA – Greg Zuerlein 36-yard field goal, 5:13. Rams 10–0. Drive: 8 plays, 62 yards, 4:32.

Second quarter

- NYG – Robbie Gould 29-yard field goal, 8:15. Rams 10–3. Drive: 14 plays, 71 yards, 6:38.
- NYG – Landon Collins 44-yard interception return (Robbie Gould kick), 7:10. Tied 10–10.

Third quarter

- No scoring plays

Fourth quarter

- NYG – Rashad Jennings 1-yard run (Robbie Gould kick), 9:23. Giants 17–10. Drive: 6 plays, 35 yards, 2:43.

Top passers

- NYG – Eli Manning – 24/37, 196 yards
- LA – Case Keenum – 32/53, 291 yards, TD, 4 INT

Top rushers

- NYG – Rashad Jennings – 13 rushes, 25 yards, TD
- LA – Todd Gurley – 15 rushes, 57 yards

Top receivers

- NYG – Victor Cruz – 5 receptions, 55 yards
- LA – Tavon Austin – 10 receptions, 57 yards, TD

The Giants played in London for the first time since their 2007 win against the Miami Dolphins. Larry Donnell fumbled on the first play from scrimmage and the Rams scored 10 quick points only to be shut out by a dominant Giants defense. Landon Collins broke out recording two interceptions, one for a touchdown which many analysts hailed as the play of the year. Dominique Rodgers-Cromartie also recorded two more interceptions, including the game-winner. The defensive front also recorded three sacks. Running back Rashad Jennings capped off a touchdown drive with a 1-yard run and the Giants won 17–10, improving to 4–3 with a Bye Week ahead.

==== Week 9: vs. Philadelphia Eagles ====
Week Nine: Philadelphia Eagles at New York Giants – Game summary

Quarter	1	2	3	4	Total
Eagles	3	7	7	6	23
Giants	14	7	7	0	28

at MetLife Stadium, East Rutherford, New Jersey

- Date: November 6
- Game time: 1:00 pm. EST
- Game weather: 56 °F (13 °C), partly cloudy
- Game attendance: 80,309
- Referee: Bill Vinovich
- TV announcers (Fox): Joe Buck, Troy Aikman and Erin Andrews
- Recap, Gamebook

Game information

First quarter

- NYG – Odell Beckham Jr. 26-yard pass from Eli Manning (Robbie Gould kick), 12:27. Giants 7–0. Drive: 2 plays, 31 yards, 0:50.
- NYG – Roger Lewis 30-yard pass from Eli Manning (Robbie Gould kick), 9:43. Giants 14–0. Drive: 3 plays, 30 yards, 1:12.
- PHI – Caleb Sturgis 34-yard field goal, 5:51. Eagles 14–3. Drive: 10 plays, 59 yards, 3:52.

Second quarter

- PHI – Ryan Mathews 8-yard rush (Caleb Sturgis kick), 12:11. Giants 14–10. Drive: 3 plays, 70 yards, 1:33.
- NYG – Odell Beckham Jr. 1-yard pass from Eli Manning (Robbie Gould kick), 9:28. Giants 21–10. Drive: 6 plays, 86 yards, 2:43.

Third quarter

- PHI – Kenjon Barner 3-yard rush (Caleb Sturgis kick), 12:17. Giants 21–17. Drive: 6 plays, 70 yards, 2:43.
- NYG – Sterling Shepard 32-yard pass from Eli Manning (Robbie Gould kick), 7:41. Giants 28–17. Drive: 10 plays, 75 yards, 4:36.

Fourth quarter

- PHI – Caleb Sturgis 26-yard field goal, 12:01. Giants 28–20. Drive: 14 plays, 80 yards, 7:26.
- PHI – Caleb Sturgis 38-yard field goal, 3:51. Giants 28–23. Drive: 8 plays, 26 yards, 3:12.

Top passers

- PHI – Carson Wentz – 27/47, 364 yards, 2 INT
- NYG – Eli Manning – 22/36, 257 yards, 4 TD, 2 INT

Top rushers

- PHI – Darren Sproles – 13 rushes, 57 yards
- NYG – Paul Perkins – 11 rushes, 32 yards

Top receivers

- PHI – Zach Ertz – 8 receptions, 97 yards
- NYG – Sterling Shepard – 3 receptions, 50 yards, TD

The Giants quickly took a 14-point lead after rookie Carson Wentz threw two interceptions on his first two drives and Eli Manning capitalized with touchdown passes to Odell Beckham Jr. and Roger Lewis. The Eagles left 9 points off the board in the first half, being stopped on 4th down in field goal range twice and having a field goal attempt blocked. The Eagles hung on and had a chance to take the lead late, but the Giants defense hung on and the Giants improved to 5–3 and beat the Eagles for the first time since 2013, and their first home win against the Eagles since 2012.

This was the 14th and final time Eli Manning threw four touchdown passes in a game.

==== Week 10: vs. Cincinnati Bengals ====
Week Ten: Cincinnati Bengals at New York Giants – Game summary

Quarter	1	2	3	4	Total
Bengals	7	3	10	0	20
Giants	7	7	0	7	21

at MetLife Stadium, East Rutherford, New Jersey

- Date: November 14
- Game time: 8:30 pm. EST
- Game weather: 56 °F (13 °C), cloudy
- Game attendance: 76,218
- Referee: John Parry
- TV announcers (ESPN): Sean McDonough, Jon Gruden and Lisa Salters
- Recap, Gamebook

Game information

First quarter

- NYG – Jerell Adams 10-yard pass from Eli Manning (Robbie Gould kick), 11:05. Giants 7–0. Drive: 8 plays, 80 yards, 3:55.
- CIN – A. J. Green 13-yard pass from Andy Dalton (Mike Nugent kick), 8:58. Tied 7–7. Drive: 3 plays, 80 yards, 2:07.

Second quarter

- CIN – Mike Nugent 25-yard field goal, 4:19. Bengals 10–7. Drive: 4 plays, 0 yards, 0:54.
- NYG – Odell Beckham Jr. 10-yard pass from Eli Manning (Robbie Gould kick), 1:17. Giants 14–10. Drive: 8 plays, 75 yards, 3:02.

Third quarter

- CIN – Jeremy Hill 9-yard run (Mike Nugent kick), 13:58. Bengals 17–14. Drive: 2 plays, 13 yards, 1:02.
- CIN – Mike Nugent 38-yard field goal, 8:52. Bengals 20–14. Drive: 7 plays, 41 yards, 3:33.

Fourth quarter

- NYG – Sterling Shepard 3-yard pass from Eli Manning (Robbie Gould kick), 14:05. Giants 21–20. Drive: 7 plays, 47 yards, 2:51.

Top passers

- CIN – Andy Dalton – 16/29, 204 yards, TD, INT
- NYG – Eli Manning – 28/44, 240 yards, 3 TD, 2 INT

Top rushers

- CIN – Jeremy Hill – 15 rushes, 46 yards, TD
- NYG – Rashad Jennings – 15 rushes, 87 yards

Top receivers

- CIN – Tyler Eifert – 3 receptions, 96 yards
- NYG – Odell Beckham Jr. – 10 receptions, 97 yards, TD

After their win over the Eagles, the Giants stayed at home for a Monday night matchup against the Cincinnati Bengals, who were coming back from London after their tie against the Redskins. Tom Coughlin, Justin Tuck, and Ernie Accorsi were inducted into the Giants Ring of Honor at halftime nursing a 14–10 lead. The Bengals quickly got 10 points and had a 6-point lead going into the 4th quarter. Sterling Shepard caught a touchdown on 4th and Goal to give the Giants a 21–20 lead. Their defense led by their vaunted pass rush took over and the offense successfully ran out the clock. The Giants improved to 6–3 and matched their win total from the previous two years.

==== Week 11: vs. Chicago Bears ====
Week Eleven: Chicago Bears at New York Giants – Game summary

Quarter	1	2	3	4	Total
Bears	9	7	0	0	16
Giants	6	3	13	0	22

at MetLife Stadium, East Rutherford, New Jersey

- Date: November 20
- Game time: 1:00 pm. EST
- Game weather: 41 °F (5 °C), mostly cloudy
- Game attendance: 78,898
- Referee: Craig Wrolstad
- TV announcers (Fox): Kevin Burkhardt, John Lynch and Pam Oliver
- Recap, Gamebook

Game information

First quarter

- CHI – Zach Miller 19-yard pass from Jay Cutler (kick failed, wide right), 9:46. Bears 6–0. Drive: 9 plays, 76 yards, 5:14.
- NYG – Rashad Jennings 2-yard run (kick failed, hit left upright), 4:04. Tied 6–6. Drive: 11 plays, 78 yards, 5:42.
- CHI – Connor Barth 40-yard field goal, 0:24. Bears 9–6. Drive: 7 plays, 39 yards, 3:40.

Second quarter

- CHI – Jeremy Langford 1-yard run (Connor Barth kick), 8:35. Bears 16–6. Drive: 8 plays, 79 yards, 4:35.
- NYG – Robbie Gould 46-yard field goal, 3:33. Bears 16–9. Drive: 14 plays, 57 yards, 5:02.

Third quarter

- NYG – Will Tye 9-yard pass from Eli Manning (Robbie Gould kick), 11:04. Tied 16–16. Drive: 9 plays, 56 yards, 3:56.
- NYG – Sterling Shepard 15-yard pass from Eli Manning (kick failed, wide left), 6:49. Giants 22–16. Drive: 7 plays, 79 yards, 3:15.

Fourth quarter

- No scoring plays

Top passers

- CHI – Jay Cutler – 17/30, 252 yards, TD, INT
- NYG – Eli Manning – 21/36, 227 yards, 2 TD

Top rushers

- CHI – Jordan Howard – 17 rushes, 77 yards
- NYG – Rashad Jennings – 21 rushes, 81 yards, TD

, 85 yards, TD Top receivers

- CHI – Cameron Meredith – 4 receptions, 49 yards
- NYG – Sterling Shepard – 5 receptions, 50 yards, TD

The Giants stayed at home for a matchup against the Chicago Bears. The Bears took a 16–9 lead at halftime. Manning threw two touchdown passes to open the second half and their defense shut out the Bears for the rest of the game. Jay Cutler threw a late interception to Landon Collins – his final pass as a Chicago Bear – to seal the win. The Giants 7–3 start was their best 10 game start since starting 9–1 in 2008. The win also ensured the Giants improved from their 6–10 campaigns from the last two years, and extended their winning streak to five consecutive games, their longest since 2010.

==== Week 12: at Cleveland Browns ====
Week Twelve: New York Giants at Cleveland Browns – Game summary

Quarter	1	2	3	4	Total
Giants	0	14	0	13	27
Browns	0	6	0	7	13

at FirstEnergy Stadium, Cleveland, Ohio

- Date: November 27
- Game time: 1:00 pm. EST
- Game weather: 48 °F (9 °C), sunny
- Game attendance: 60,034
- Referee: Walt Anderson
- TV announcers (Fox): Dick Stockton, Matt Millen and Peter Schrager
- Recap, Gamebook

Game information

First quarter

- No scoring plays

Second quarter

- NYG – Dwayne Harris 13-yard pass from Eli Manning (Robbie Gould kick), 7:03. Giants 7–0. Drive: 2 plays, 31 yards, 0:42.
- CLE – Cody Parkey 20-yard field goal, 1:43. Giants 7–3. Drive: 10 plays, 28 yards, 3:51.
- NYG – Odell Beckham Jr. 32-yard pass from Eli Manning (Robbie Gould kick), 1:13. Giants 14–3. Drive: 4 plays, 69 yards, 0:30.
- CLE – Cody Parkey 25-yard field goal, 0:00. Giants 14–6. Drive: 8 plays, 68 yards, 1:13.

Third quarter

- No scoring plays

Fourth quarter

- NYG – Jason Pierre-Paul 48-yard fumble return (kick failed, wide right), 10:58. Giants 20–6.
- CLE – Corey Coleman 21-yard pass from Josh McCown (Cody Parkey kick), 8:17. Giants 20–13. Drive: 5 plays, 75 yards, 2:41.
- NYG – Odell Beckham Jr. 4-yard pass from Eli Manning (Robbie Gould kick), 5:10. Giants 27–13. Drive: 6 plays, 73 yards, 3:07.

Top passers

- NYG – Eli Manning – 15/27, 194 yards, 3 TD
- CLE – Josh McCown – 25/43, 322 yards, TD

Top rushers

- NYG – Rashad Jennings – 15 rushes, 55 yards
- CLE – Isaiah Crowell – 16 rushes, 44 yards

Top receivers

- NYG – Odell Beckham Jr. – 6 receptions, 96 yards, 2 TD
- CLE – Terrelle Pryor – 6 receptions, 131 yards

The Giants played a conservative game and their defense recorded a season-high six sacks in their win over the Browns, their sixth in a row. Eli Manning threw three touchdowns, two caught by Odell Beckham Jr. and Jason Pierre-Paul also had a touchdown on defense. This loss dropped the Browns to 0–12. The Giants also had their first six-game winning streak since 2008.

==== Week 13: at Pittsburgh Steelers ====
Week Thirteen: New York Giants at Pittsburgh Steelers – Game summary

Quarter	1	2	3	4	Total
Giants	0	0	7	7	14
Steelers	5	9	7	3	24

at Heinz Field, Pittsburgh, Pennsylvania

- Date: December 4
- Game time: 4:25 pm. EST
- Game weather: 43 °F (6 °C), cloudy
- Game attendance: 65,825
- Referee: Terry McAulay
- TV announcers (Fox): Joe Buck, Troy Aikman and Erin Andrews
- Preview, Gamebook

Game information

First quarter

- PIT – Penalty on Ereck Flowers enforced in the end zone for a safety, 3:04. Steelers 2–0.
- PIT – Randy Bullock 44-yard field goal, 0:04. Steelers 5–0. Drive: 7 plays, 38 yards, 3:00.

Second quarter

- PIT – Antonio Brown 22-yard pass from Ben Roethlisberger (pass failed), 7:10. Steelers 11–0. Drive: 3 plays, 40 yards, 1:11.
- PIT – Randy Bullock 34-yard field goal, 0:24. Steelers 14–0. Drive: 15 plays, 64 yards, 5:52.

Third quarter

- NYG – Rashad Jennings 13-yard pass from Eli Manning (Robbie Gould kick), 6:30. Steelers 14–7. Drive: 2 plays, 17 yards, 0:42.
- PIT – Ladarius Green 20-yard pass from Ben Roethlisberger (Randy Bullock kick), 3:09. Steelers 21–7. Drive: 7 plays, 88 yards, 3:21.

Fourth quarter

- PIT – Randy Bullock 38-yard field goal, 1:39. Steelers 24–7. Drive: 11 plays, 48 yards, 5:17.
- NYG – Sterling Shepard 1-yard pass from Eli Manning (Robbie Gould kick), 0:26. Steelers 24–14. Drive: 5 plays, 52 yards, 1:13.

Top passers

- NYG – Eli Manning – 24/39, 195 yards, 2 TD, 2 INT
- PIT – Ben Roethlisberger – 24/36, 289 yards, 2 TD, INT

Top rushers

- NYG – Paul Perkins – 7 rushes, 38 yards
- PIT – Le'Veon Bell – 29 rushes, 118 yards

Top receivers

- NYG – Odell Beckham Jr. – 10 receptions, 100 yards
- PIT – Ladarius Green – 6 receptions, 110 yards, TD

Trying to win their seventh game in a row, the Giants travelled to Pittsburgh to take on the Steelers' Killer B's (Ben Roethlisberger, Le'Veon Bell and Antonio Brown) who made an impact in the game. The Steelers defense was in Eli Manning's face all game, forcing two interceptions. The Giants lost 24–14, with a touchdown in garbage time, and snapped their 6-game winning streak. Rookie Eli Apple was a bright spot for the Giants, recording both his first career fumble recovery and interception in the 3rd quarter.

==== Week 14: vs. Dallas Cowboys ====
Week Fourteen: Dallas Cowboys at New York Giants – Game summary

Quarter	1	2	3	4	Total
Cowboys	7	0	0	0	7
Giants	0	0	10	0	10

at MetLife Stadium, East Rutherford, New Jersey

- Date: December 11
- Game time: 8:30 pm. EST
- Game weather: 32 °F (0 °C), cloudy
- Game attendance: 80,874
- Referee: Carl Cheffers
- TV announcers (NBC): Al Michaels, Cris Collinsworth and Michele Tafoya
- Recap, Gamebook

Game information

First quarter

- DAL – Terrance Williams 31-yard pass from Dak Prescott (Dan Bailey kick), 4:44. Cowboys 7–0. Drive: 10 plays, 67 yards, 4:06.

Second quarter

- No scoring plays

Third quarter

- NYG – Robbie Gould 39-yard field goal, 5:50. Cowboys 7–3. Drive: 11 plays, 35 yards, 4:49.
- NYG – Odell Beckham Jr. 61-yard pass from Eli Manning (Robbie Gould kick), 1:07. Giants 10–7. Drive: 2 plays, 61 yards, 0:43.

Fourth quarter

- No scoring plays

Top passers

- DAL – Dak Prescott – 17/37, 165 yards, TD, 2 INT
- NYG – Eli Manning – 17/28, 193 yards, TD, INT

Top rushers

- DAL – Ezekiel Elliott – 24 rushes, 107 yards
- NYG – Rashad Jennings – 15 rushes, 45 yards

Top receivers

- DAL – Terrance Williams – 5 receptions, 76 yards, TD
- NYG – Odell Beckham Jr. – 4 receptions, 94 yards, TD

The Cowboys won 11 games in a row since losing to the Giants in Week 1 and had clinched a playoff berth the week before. Meanwhile. the Giants were shorthanded after losing Jason Pierre-Paul to injury. On Sunday Night Football, the defenses showed out, both allowing 260 total yards, forcing three takeaways, and each recording three sacks. After allowing Terrance Williams to get wide open for a touchdown in the first quarter, the Giants defense did not allow a single point for the rest of the game. Dak Prescott was picked off by Janoris Jenkins in the first half while the Cowboys defense forced two Eli Manning fumbles of their own. Trailing 7–3 in the third quarter, Leon Hall intercepted Prescott and Manning threw a 61-yard touchdown pass to Odell Beckham Jr. two plays later, which would be the game-winner. Jenkins forced a Dez Bryant fumble on his only catch of the game, thwarting a Cowboys 4th quarter rally. With the 10–7 win, the Giants improved to 9–4 and clinched a winning season for the first time since 2012. The Giants also swept the Cowboys for the first time since their 2011 Super Bowl-winning season.

Ezekiel Elliott rushed for 107 yards for the Cowboys despite the loss. This was the Giants last primetime win at home until 2023.

==== Week 15: vs. Detroit Lions ====
Week Fifteen: Detroit Lions at New York Giants – Game summary

Quarter	1	2	3	4	Total
Lions	0	3	3	0	6
Giants	7	3	0	7	17

at MetLife Stadium, East Rutherford, New Jersey

- Date: December 18
- Game time: 1:00 pm. EST
- Game weather: 55 °F (13 °C), rain
- Game attendance: 79,434
- Referee: Tony Corrente
- TV announcers (Fox): Joe Buck, Troy Aikman and Erin Andrews
- Recap, Gamebook

Game information

First quarter

- NYG – Sterling Shepard 6-yard pass from Eli Manning (Robbie Gould kick), 9:23. Giants 7–0. Drive: 10 plays, 75 yards, 5:37.

Second quarter

- DET – Matt Prater 48-yard field goal, 14:02. Giants 7–3. Drive: 11 plays, 40 yards, 5:27.
- NYG – Robbie Gould 47-yard field goal, 5:00. Giants 10–3. Drive: 11 plays, 51 yards, 5:53.

Third quarter

- DET – Matt Prater 33-yard field goal, 7:40. Giants 10–6. Drive: 12 plays, 45 yards, 7:20.

Fourth quarter

- NYG – Odell Beckham Jr. 4-yard pass from Eli Manning (Robbie Gould kick), 5:47. Giants 17–6. Drive: 8 plays, 71 yards, 3:23.

Top passers

- DET – Matthew Stafford – 24/39, 273 yards, INT
- NYG – Eli Manning – 20/28, 201 yards, 2 TD

Top rushers

- DET – Dwayne Washington – 14 rushes, 31 yards
- NYG – Paul Perkins – 11 rushes, 6 yards

Top receivers

- DET – Golden Tate – 8 receptions, 122 yards
- NYG – Odell Beckham Jr. – 6 receptions, 64 yards, TD

Sterling Shepard scored a touchdown on the opening drive but the offense wasn't able to do much afterwards. Their defense played outstanding and forced two red zone turnovers. While leading 10–6 in the 4th quarter, Odell Beckham Jr. had a signature one-handed touchdown catch and an interception by Dominique Rodgers-Cromartie sealed the 17–6 victory. The 10–4 Giants were in the drivers seat to clinch their first playoff berth in 5 years.

==== Week 16: at Philadelphia Eagles ====
Week Sixteen: New York Giants at Philadelphia Eagles – Game summary

Quarter	1	2	3	4	Total
Giants	3	10	3	3	19
Eagles	14	7	0	3	24

at Lincoln Financial Field, Philadelphia, Pennsylvania

- Date: December 22
- Game time: 8:30 pm. EST
- Game weather: 40 °F (4 °C), partly cloudy
- Game attendance: 69,596
- Referee: Clete Blakeman
- TV announcers (NBC/NFLN/Twitter): Mike Tirico, Cris Collinsworth and Heather Cox
- Recap, Gamebook

Game information

First quarter

- PHI – Darren Sproles 25-yard run (Caleb Sturgis kick), 9:48. Eagles 7–0. Drive: 7 plays, 78 yards, 4:13.
- PHI – Malcolm Jenkins 34-yard interception return (Caleb Sturgis kick), 8:20. Eagles 14–0.
- NYG – Robbie Gould 35-yard field goal, 0:10. Eagles 14–3. Drive: 12 plays, 80 yards, 5:48.

Second quarter

- NYG – Robbie Gould 35-yard field goal, 7:28. Eagles 14–6. Drive: 9 plays, 39 yards, 4:00.
- PHI – Nelson Agholor 40-yard pass from Carson Wentz (Caleb Sturgis kick), 4:59. Eagles 21–6. Drive: 5 plays, 75 yards, 2:29.
- NYG – Sterling Shepard 13-yard pass from Eli Manning (Robbie Gould kick), 0:33. Eagles 21–13. Drive: 12 plays, 84 yards, 4:26.

Third quarter

- NYG – Robbie Gould 29-yard field goal, 9:09. Eagles 21–16. Drive: 10 plays, 56 yards, 4:08.

Fourth quarter

- PHI – Caleb Sturgis 41-yard field goal, 8:47. Eagles 24–16. Drive: 7 plays, 33 yards, 3:10.
- NYG – Robbie Gould 41-yard field goal, 5:17. Eagles 24–19. Drive: 10 plays, 52 yards, 3:30.

Top passers

- NYG – Eli Manning – 38/63, 356 yards, TD, 3 INT
- PHI – Carson Wentz – 13/24, 152 yards, TD, INT

Top rushers

- NYG – Paul Perkins – 15 rushes, 68 yards
- PHI – Ryan Mathews – 18 rushes, 46 yards

Top receivers

- NYG – Odell Beckham Jr. – 11 receptions, 150 yards
- PHI – Nelson Agholor – 2 receptions, 47 yards

The Giants were down 14–0 early after Manning threw a pick six to Malcolm Jenkins. The offense got going, but failed to convert on their scoring opportunities. Four Robbie Gould field goals weren't enough, and the Giants fell to the Eagles 24–19, dropping them to 10–5. The loss clinched the NFC East and home field advantage for the Dallas Cowboys.

Despite the loss, the Giants clinched a playoff berth when the Tampa Bay Buccaneers fell to the New Orleans Saints 31–24 two days later. Ben McAdoo became the fifth Giants head coach to clinch a playoff berth in his first season, and the first since Jim Fassel in 1997.

==== Week 17: at Washington Redskins ====
Week Seventeen: New York Giants at Washington Redskins – Game summary

Quarter	1	2	3	4	Total
Giants	3	7	0	9	19
Redskins	0	0	3	7	10

at FedExField, Landover, Maryland

- Date: January 1, 2017
- Game time: 4:25 pm. EST
- Game weather: Sunny, 53 °F (12 °C)
- Game attendance: 79,471
- Referee: Gene Steratore
- TV announcers (Fox): Joe Buck, Troy Aikman and Erin Andrews
- Recap, Gamebook

Game information

First quarter

- NYG – Robbie Gould 22-yard field goal, 2:12. Giants 3–0. Drive: 13 plays, 56 yards, 6:40.

Second quarter

- NYG – Rashad Jennings 2-yard run (Robbie Gould kick), 9:29. Giants 10–0. Drive: 11 plays, 74 yards, 5:40.

Third quarter

- WAS – Dustin Hopkins 32-yard field goal, 0:25. Giants 10–3. Drive: 5 plays, 33 yards, 2:11.

Fourth quarter

- WAS – Jordan Reed 1-yard pass from Kirk Cousins (Dustin Hopkins kick), 8:13. Tied 10–10. Drive: 11 plays, 76 yards, 5:14.
- NYG – Robbie Gould 40-yard field goal, 2:12. Giants 13–10. Drive: 8 plays, 58 yards, 3:49.
- NYG – Trevin Wade 11-yard fumble return (run failed), 0:00. Giants 19–10.

Top passers

- NYG – Eli Manning – 17/27, 180 yards
- WAS – Kirk Cousins – 22/35, 287 yards, TD, 2 INT

Top rushers

- NYG – Paul Perkins – 21 rushes, 102 yards
- WAS – Robert Kelley – 12 rushes, 33 yards

Top receivers

- NYG – Will Tye – 4 receptions, 47 yards
- WAS – Pierre Garçon – 4 receptions, 96 yards

Having been locked into the 5 seed, the media questioned whether the Giants would rest their starters against the Redskins who were fighting for their playoff lives. They did not. After struggling to move the ball all game, the Redskins broke through the Giants defense in the second half, tying the game at 10. On a late drive in the 4th quarter, Eli Manning connected with Tavarres King for 44 yards which set up a Josh Brown field goal. When the Redskins got the ball back, Kirk Cousins was intercepted by Dominique Rodgers-Cromartie. They used their timeouts to get the ball back for one last chance, but Trevin Wade recovered the lateral and scored for the Giants, winning 19–10.

The Redskins were eliminated with the loss, and the Giants won 11 games for the first time since 2008. The Giants were set to play the Green Bay Packers at Lambeau Field after they defeated the Detroit Lions later that night to win the NFC North title.

=== Postseason ===
==== NFC Wild Card Playoffs: at #4 Green Bay Packers ====
NFC Wild Card Playoffs: (5) New York Giants at (4) Green Bay Packers – Game summary

Quarter	1	2	3	4	Total
Giants	3	3	7	0	13
Packers	0	14	10	14	38

at Lambeau Field, Green Bay, Wisconsin

- Date: January 8, 2017
- Game time: 4:40 p.m. EST/3:40 p.m. CST
- Game weather: 14 °F (−10 °C), clear
- Game attendance: 77,549
- Referee: Ed Hochuli
- TV announcers (Fox): Joe Buck, Troy Aikman, Erin Andrews and Chris Myers
- Recap, Gamebook

Game information

First quarter

- NYG – Robbie Gould 26-yard field goal, 5:44. Giants 3–0. Drive: 9 play, 54 yards, 3:34.

Second quarter

- NYG – Robbie Gould 40-yard field goal, 7:24. Giants 6–0. Drive: 7 play, 70 yards, 2:47.
- GB – Davante Adams 5-yard pass from Aaron Rodgers (Mason Crosby kick), 2:20. Packers 7–6. Drive: 3 plays, 38 yards, 1:25.
- GB – Randall Cobb 42-yard pass from Aaron Rodgers (Mason Crosby kick), 0:00. Packers 14–6. Drive: 8 plays, 80 yards, 1:38.

Third quarter

- NYG – Tavarres King 41-yard pass from Eli Manning (Robbie Gould kick), 5:16. Packers 14–13. Drive: 2 plays, 41 yards, 0:45.
- GB – Randall Cobb 30-yard pass from Aaron Rodgers (Mason Crosby kick), 2:53. Packers 21–13. Drive: 4 plays, 63 yards, 2:23.
- GB – Mason Crosby 32-yard field goal, 0:21. Packers 24–13. Drive: 5 play, 23 yards, 1:29.

Fourth quarter

- GB – Randall Cobb 16-yard pass from Aaron Rodgers (Mason Crosby kick), 9:19. Packers 31–13. Drive: 10 plays, 80 yards, 5:14.
- GB – Aaron Ripkowski 1-yard run (Mason Crosby kick), 2:43. Packers 38–13. Drive: 9 plays, 55 yards, 5:48.

Top passers

- NYG – Eli Manning – 23/44, 299 yards, TD, INT
- GB – Aaron Rodgers – 25/40, 362 yards, 4 TD

Top rushers

- NYG – Paul Perkins – 10 rushes, 30 yards
- GB – Christine Michael – 10 rushes, 47 yards

Top receivers

- NYG – Tavarres King – 3 receptions, 73 yards, TD
- GB – Davante Adams – 8 receptions, 125 yards, TD

== Standings ==
=== Division ===
NFC East
	W	L	T	PCT	DIV	CONF	PF	PA	STK
^{(1)} Dallas Cowboys	13	3	0	.813	3–3	9–3	421	306	L1
^{(5)} New York Giants	11	5	0	.688	4–2	8–4	310	284	W1
Washington Redskins	8	7	1	.531	3–3	6–6	396	383	L1
Philadelphia Eagles	7	9	0	.438	2–4	5–7	367	331	W2

=== Conference ===
NFC
#	Team	Division	W	L	T	PCT	DIV	CONF	SOS	SOV	STK
Division leaders
1	Dallas Cowboys	East	13	3	0	.813	3–3	9–3	.471	.440	L1
2	Atlanta Falcons	South	11	5	0	.688	5–1	9–3	.480	.452	W4
3	Seattle Seahawks	West	10	5	1	.656	3–2–1	6–5–1	.441	.425	W1
4	Green Bay Packers	North	10	6	0	.625	5–1	8–4	.508	.453	W6
Wild Cards
5	New York Giants	East	11	5	0	.688	4–2	8–4	.486	.455	W1
6 (Note: Detroit finished ahead of Tampa Bay for the No. 6 seed and qualified for the last playoff spot based on record vs. common opponents—Detroit's cumulative record against Chicago, Dallas, Los Angeles and New Orleans was 3–2, while Tampa Bay's cumulative record against the same four teams was 2–3.)	Detroit Lions	North	9	7	0	.563	3–3	7–5	.475	.392	L3
Did not qualify for the postseason
7	Tampa Bay Buccaneers	South	9	7	0	.563	4–2	7–5	.492	.434	W1
8	Washington Redskins	East	8	7	1	.531	3–3	6–6	.516	.430	L1
9	Minnesota Vikings	North	8	8	0	.500	2–4	5–7	.492	.457	W1
10	Arizona Cardinals	West	7	8	1	.469	4–1–1	6–5–1	.463	.366	W2
11 (Note: New Orleans finished ahead of Philadelphia based on better record vs. conference opponents.)	New Orleans Saints	South	7	9	0	.438	2–4	6–6	.523	.393	L1
12	Philadelphia Eagles	East	7	9	0	.438	2–4	5–7	.559	.518	W2
13	Carolina Panthers	South	6	10	0	.375	1–5	5–7	.518	.354	L2
14	Los Angeles Rams	West	4	12	0	.250	2–4	3–9	.504	.500	L7
15	Chicago Bears	North	3	13	0	.188	2–4	3–9	.521	.396	L4
16	San Francisco 49ers	West	2	14	0	.125	2–4	2–10	.504	.250	L1
Tiebreakers (Note: When breaking ties for three or more teams under the NFL's rules, they are first broken within divisions, then comparing only the highest-ranked remaining team from each division.)
