= Jerell Adams =

American football player (born 1992)

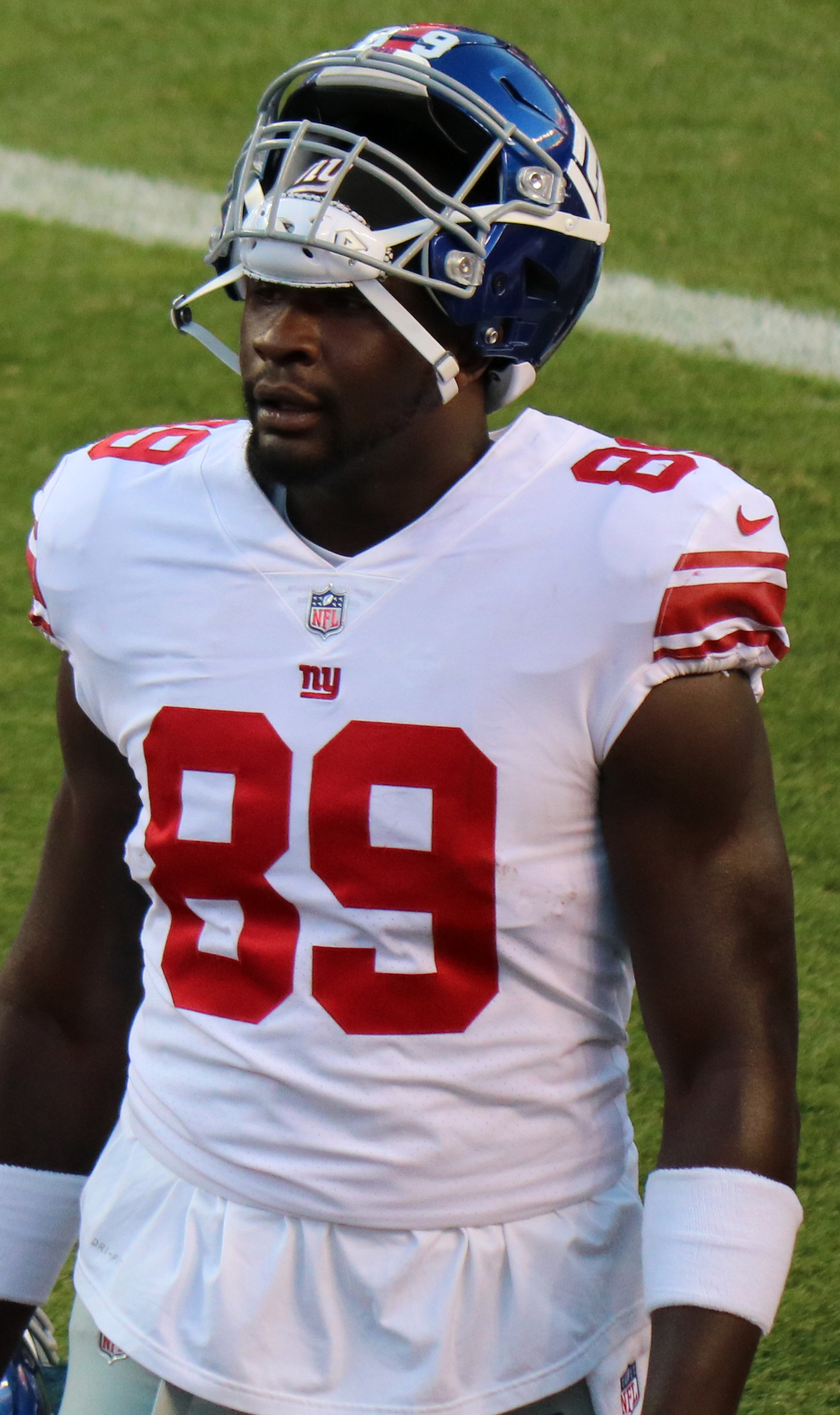
- Adams with the New York Giants in 2017

No. 89
- Position: Tight end

Personal information
- Born: December 31, 1992 (age 33); Pinewood, South Carolina, U.S.
- Listed height: 6 ft 5 in (1.96 m)
- Listed weight: 254 lb (115 kg)

Career information
- High school: Scott's Branch (Summerton, South Carolina)
- College: South Carolina
- NFL draft: 2016: 6th round, 184th overall pick

Career history
- New York Giants (2016–2017); Houston Texans (2018–2019)*; New Orleans Saints (2019)*; Baltimore Ravens (2020)*; Detroit Lions (2020)*; Tampa Bay Buccaneers (2021)*
- * Offseason or practice squad member only

Career NFL statistics
- Receptions: 24
- Receiving yards: 214
- Receiving touchdowns: 1
- Stats at Pro Football Reference

Jerell D. Adams (born December 31, 1992) is an American former professional football player who was a tight end in the National Football League (NFL). He played college football for the South Carolina Gamecocks.

== Early life ==
Adams attended Scott's Branch High School in Summerton, South Carolina. He played football and basketball. In football, he played quarterback, tight end, linebacker, defensive end and punter. During his career he passed for 689 yards with 12 touchdowns and had 21 receptions for 581 yards and eight receiving touchdowns on offense. As a senior in basketball, he averaged 19 points and 13 rebounds as a junior. Adams spent a year at Fork Union Military Academy after high school.

== College career ==
Adams played at South Carolina from 2012 to 2015. During his career, he played in 47 games with 15 starts, finishing with 66 receptions for 977 yards and seven touchdowns.

== Professional career ==
=== Pre-draft ===
On December 14, 2015, it was announced that Adams had accepted his invitation to play in the 2016 Senior Bowl. Throughout Senior Bowl practices, Adams garnered attention and impressed scouts by showcasing his blocking ability and making multiple difficult catches. On January 30, 2016, Adams made three receptions for 49 yards and was a part of Jacksonville Jaguars head coach Gus Bradley's South team that defeated the North 27–16. Adams was one of 15 collegiate tight ends to attend the NFL Scouting Combine in Indianapolis, Indiana. He ran the fastest 40-yard dash among all tight ends and finished seventh in the vertical jump and three-cone drill. On March 30, 2016, Adams attended South Carolina's pro day, along with Brandon Shell, Pharoh Cooper, Brandon Wilds, and 13 other prospects. He opted to stand on his combine numbers and perform only positional drills and the bench press for scouts and team representatives from all 32 NFL teams. At the conclusion of the pre-draft process, Adams was projected to be a third or fourth-round pick by NFL draft experts and scouts. He was ranked the second best tight end in the draft by NFL analyst Mike Mayock, was ranked the fourth best tight end by NFLDraftScout.com, and the fifth best tight end by Sports Illustrated.

Pre-draft measurables
| Height | Weight | Arm length | Hand span | 40-yard dash | 10-yard split | 20-yard split | 20-yard shuttle | Three-cone drill | Vertical jump | Broad jump | Bench press |
|---|---|---|---|---|---|---|---|---|---|---|---|
| 6 ft 5 1/8 in (1.96 m) | 247 lb (112 kg) | 34 3/8 in (0.87 m) | 9 3/4 in (0.25 m) | 4.64 s | 1.64 s | 2.72 s | 4.31 s | 7.05 s | 32 1/2 in (0.83 m) | 9 ft 9 in (2.97 m) | 18 reps |
All values from NFL Combine/South Carolina's Pro Day

=== New York Giants ===
==== 2016 ====
The New York Giants selected Adams in the sixth round (184th overall) of the 2016 NFL draft. He was the seventh tight end selected and was the last of three South Carolina players drafted, after Pharoh Cooper and Brandon Shell. On May 6, 2016, the Giants signed Adams to a four-year, $2.48 million contract that includes a signing bonus of $142,855.

Throughout training camp, he competed with Matt LaCosse, Larry Donnell, Will Tye, and Ryan Malleck for the job as the starting tight end. Head coach Ben McAdoo named him the third tight end on the Giants' depth chart, behind veterans Donnell and Tye.

On September 18, 2016, he made his professional regular season debut in the Giants' 16–13 victory over the New Orleans Saints in Week 2. On October 9, 2016, Adams made two receptions for 27 yards during the Giants' 23–16 loss at the Green Bay Packers. He made his first career reception on a 13-yard pass by Eli Manning in the fourth quarter before being tackled by linebacker Joe Thomas. On November 6, 2016, Adams caught three passes for a season-high 24 receiving yards during a 28–23 victory over the Philadelphia Eagles. The following week, he caught a season-high tying three passes for 18-yards and a touchdown in a 21–20 victory over the Cincinnati Bengals in Week 10. He scored his first career touchdown on a ten-yard pass by Eli Manning in the first quarter. In Week 15, Adams earned his first career start and had three catches for 18-yards as the Giants defeated the Detroit Lions 17–6. He was inactive for the Giants' 19–10 victory over the Washington Redskins in Week 17. He finished the 2016 season with 16 receptions for 122 receiving yards and one touchdown in 13 games and two starts. The Giants finished with an 11–5 record and received a playoff berth after finishing second in the NFC East. Adams was inactive for their NFC Wildcard loss to the Packers.

==== 2017 ====
Adams entered training camp competing against Rhett Ellison, Tye, and LaCosse for the second tight end position behind rookie first-round pick Evan Engram. New head coach Ben McAdoo named Adams the No. 3 tight end behind Engram and Ellison to begin the regular season.

On September 18, 2017, Adams had one reception for a season-high 38 receiving yards in a 24–10 loss to the Detroit Lions. McAdoo was fired after Week 13, due to the Giants poor 2–10 record. On December 24, he made a season-high four receptions for 31-yards as the Giants lost 23–0 at the Arizona Cardinals. He finished the 2017 season with eight receptions for 92 receiving yards in 16 games and one start.

==== 2018 ====
On September 2, 2018, Adams was waived by the Giants.

=== Houston Texans ===
On October 10, 2018, Adams was signed to the Houston Texans' practice squad. He signed a reserve/future contract with Houston on January 7, 2019.

On October 1, 2019, Adams was waived by the Texans and was subsequently re-signed to the team's practice squad. He was released by Houston on December 3.

=== New Orleans Saints ===
On December 12, 2019, Adams was signed to the New Orleans Saints' practice squad. He was released by New Orleans on December 27.

=== Baltimore Ravens ===
Adams signed with the Baltimore Ravens on August 3, 2020. On September 5, the Ravens released Adams, before re-signing him to their practice squad the next day. Adams was released by Baltimore on October 6.

=== Detroit Lions ===
On December 9, 2020, Adams signed with the practice squad of the Detroit Lions.

=== Tampa Bay Buccaneers ===
On May 17, 2021, Adams signed with the Tampa Bay Buccaneers. He was released by the Buccaneers on August 31.

== NFL career statistics ==
Legend
| | Led the league |
| **Bold** | Career high |

=== Regular season ===
| Year | Team | Games | | Receiving | | | | | Fumbles | |
| Year | Team | GP | GS | Rec | Yds | Avg | Lng | TD | Fum | Lost |
|---|---|---|---|---|---|---|---|---|---|---|
| 2016 | NYG | 13 | **2** | **16** | **122** | 7.6 | 14 | **1** | **1** | 0 |
| 2017 | NYG | **16** | 1 | 8 | 92 | **11.5** | **38** | 0 | 0 | 0 |
| Career | | 29 | 3 | 24 | 214 | 8.9 | 38 | 1 | 1 | 0 |
