= Matt LaCosse =

American football player (born 1992)

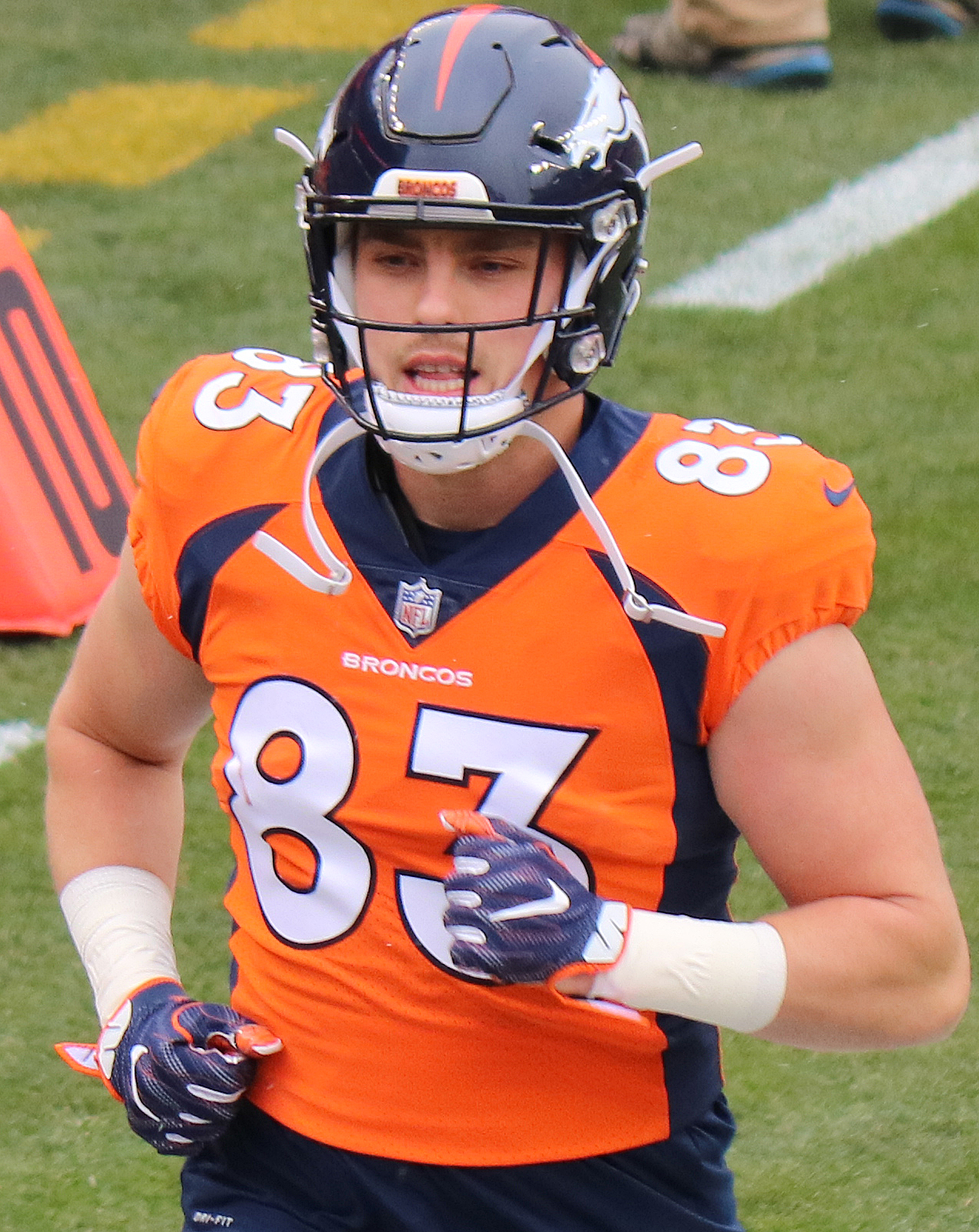
- LaCosse with the Denver Broncos in 2017

No. 43, 45, 81, 83
- Position: Tight end

Personal information
- Born: September 21, 1992 (age 34); Naperville, Illinois, U.S.
- Listed height: 6 ft 6 in (1.98 m)
- Listed weight: 255 lb (116 kg)

Career information
- High school: Naperville North (Naperville, Illinois)
- College: Illinois
- NFL draft: 2015: undrafted

Career history
- New York Giants (2015)*; New York Jets (2015)*; New York Giants (2015–2017); Denver Broncos (2017–2018); New England Patriots (2019–2021)
- * Offseason or practice squad member only

Career NFL statistics
- Receptions: 40
- Receiving yards: 403
- Receiving touchdowns: 2
- Stats at Pro Football Reference

Matthew Robert LaCosse (born September 21, 1992) is an American former professional football player. He was a tight end in the National Football League (NFL) for the New York Giants, Denver Broncos, and New England Patriots. He played college football at Illinois.

== Early life ==
At Naperville North High School in Naperville, Illinois, LaCosse played football, basketball, and baseball, earning eight varsity letters. As quarterback, he led Naperville North to the Class 8A quarterfinals in his senior year. In his senior season, he recorded 1,218 rushing yards, 14 rushing touchdowns, 919 passing yards, and five passing touchdowns. In the opening game of the season against Nequa Valley, he set the school record for most rushing yards in a game. He was named honorable mention All-State by the Chicago Tribune and was rated as a three-star recruit by Rivals.com. He initially gave an oral commitment to the University of Minnesota, but after their coach, Tim Brewster, was fired, LaCosse reconsidered and eventually chose Illinois.

== College career ==
As a true freshman in 2011, LaCosse played in 10 games for the Illini. He made one start that year. His debut came against South Dakota State. He caught his first career pass for 11 yards in a game at Minnesota.

As a sophomore in 2012, LaCosse played in all 12 games at tight end and also received playing time on special teams. He recorded three catches for 32 yards. One of his receptions was for a successful two-point conversion against Ohio State.

LaCosse played in all 12 games and started nine of those games as the tight end in 2013. As a junior, he totaled 20 receptions for 237 yards. He ranked third on the team with three touchdown receptions. His season was highlighted by his career-high five receptions at Indiana. He also recorded three catches for 68 yards and two touchdowns against Miami (Ohio). He caught a two-point conversion pass against Southern Illinois.

During his senior year at Illinois in 2014, he recorded 14 receptions for a total of 117 yards and three touchdowns. At the Illinois Pro Day, LaCosse ran his 40-yard dash in 4.64 seconds, and got 20 bench press reps of 225 pounds.

== Professional career ==
Pre-draft measurables
Height	Weight	40-yard dash	10-yard split	20-yard split	20-yard shuttle	Three-cone drill	Vertical jump	Broad jump	Bench press
6 ft 5 7/8 in (1.98 m)	257 lb (117 kg)	4.64 s	1.60 s	2.72 s	4.57 s	7.30 s	30 in (0.76 m)	9 ft 8 in (2.95 m)	20 reps
All values from Illinois' Pro Day

=== New York Giants (first stint) ===
LaCosse went undrafted in the 2015 NFL draft. On May 3, 2015, the New York Giants signed LaCosse to a three-year, $1.58 million contract that includes a signing bonus of $5,000.

Throughout training camp, LaCosse competed for a roster spot as the third tight end on the depth chart against Adrien Robinson, Jerome Cunningham, and Will Tye. On July 31, 2015, LaCosse injured his hamstring during the Giants' first training camp practice. On August 1, 2015, the Giants officially waived/injured LaCosse. After clearing waivers, LaCosse was placed on injured reserve. On August 4, 2015, the Giants released LaCosse from injured reserve after reaching an injury settlement.

=== New York Jets ===
On August 24, 2015, the New York Jets signed LaCosse. On August 30, 2015, the Jets officially waived LaCosse after a six-day stint.

=== New York Giants (second stint) ===
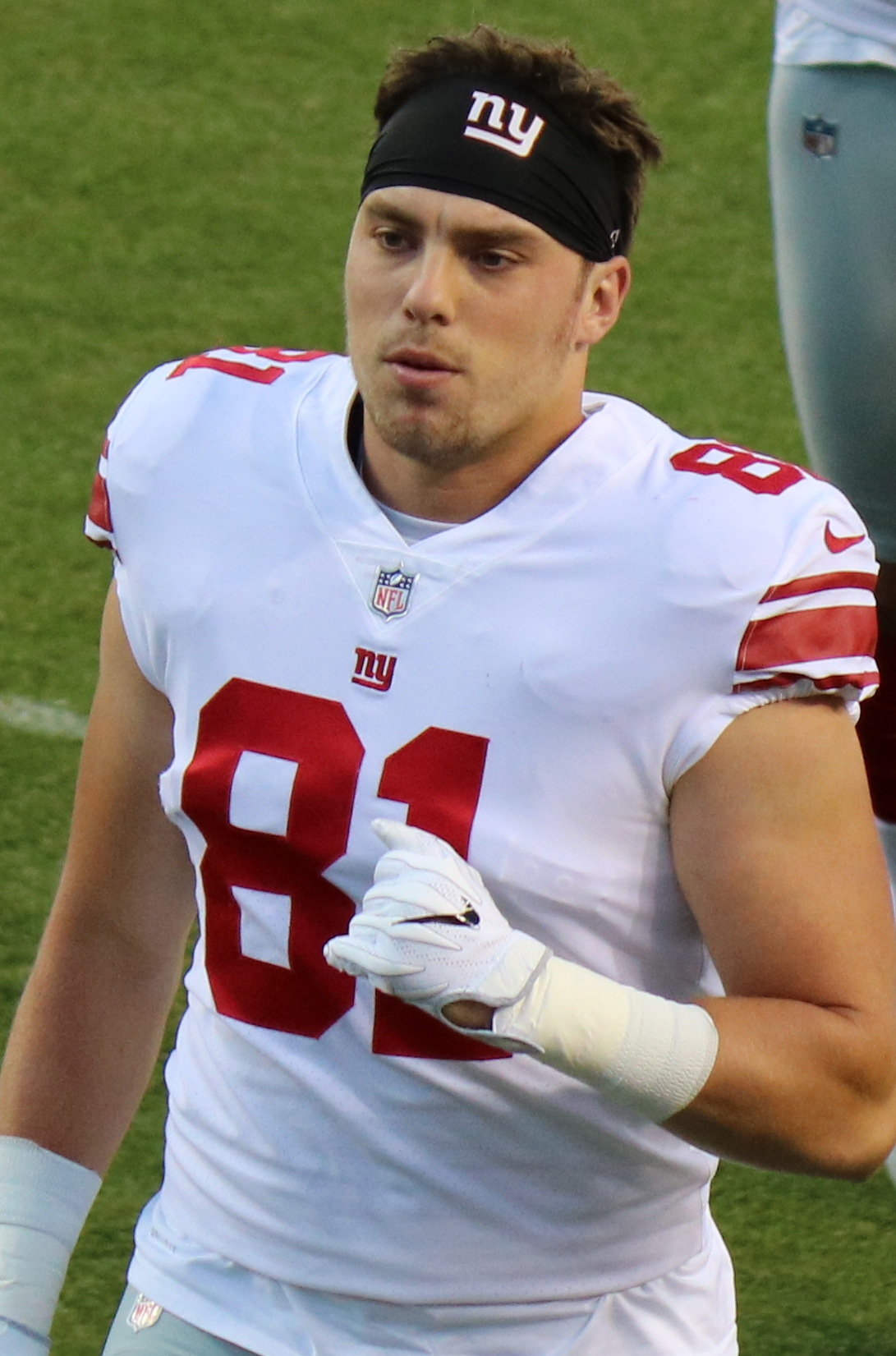
LaCosse with the New York Giants in 2017

On November 3, 2015, the Giants signed LaCosse to their practice squad after he performed well at a tryout and earned the job over Adrien Robinson. LaCosse was signed to provide depth after Daniel Fells was placed on injured reserve and Larry Donnell sustained a neck injury. On December 25, 2015, the Giants promoted LaCosse to the 53-man roster. Head coach Tom Coughlin named LaCosse the third tight end on the depth chart, behind Tye and Jerome Cunningham. On December 27, 2015, LaCosse made his professional regular season debut and caught three passes for 22-yards during a 49–17 loss at the Minnesota Vikings in Week 16. He finished his rookie season in 2015 with three receptions for 22 receiving yards in two games and zero starts.

LaCosse entered training camp as a candidate to earn the job as the starting tight end. He competed against Donnell and Tye for the job as the starter. On August 20, 2016, LaCosse injured his knee during a 21–0 loss at the Buffalo Bills during their second preseason game. On August 29, 2016, the New York Giants waived/injured LaCosse. After clearing waivers, he was placed on injured reserve.

On February 14, 2017, Lacosse signed a one-year deal with the Giants as an exclusive rights free agent. Throughout training camp, LaCosse competed against Tye, Jerell Adams, and Rhett Ellison to be the second tight end on the Giants' depth chart. Head coach Ben McAdoo named LaCosse the fourth tight end on the Giants' depth chart to begin the regular season, behind Rhett Ellison, Evan Engram, and Jerell Adams.

LaCosse was inactive for the first five games (Weeks 1–5) as a healthy scratch. On October 22, 2017, LaCosse earned his first career start during a 24–7 loss to the Seattle Seahawks in Week 7. On November 11, 2017, the New York Giants released LaCosse, but re-signed him to their practice squad the next day.

=== Denver Broncos ===
On December 12, 2017, the Denver Broncos signed LaCosse off the Giants' practice squad. He finished the 2017 NFL season without a reception and appeared in five games with zero starts.

During training camp, LaCosse competed against Austin Traylor, Jeff Heuerman, and Troy Fumagalli for the job as the primary backup tight end. Head coach Vance Joseph named LaCosse the third tight end on the depth chart to begin the regular season, behind Jeff Heuerman and Jake Butt. LaCosse became the primary backup tight end after Jake Butt tore his ACL on September 27, 2018. In Week 8, LaCosse caught a season-high four passes for 29-yards during a 30–23 loss at the Kansas City Chiefs. On November 18, 2018, LaCosse earned his first career start and had a nine-yard reception as the Broncos defeated the Los Angeles Chargers 23–22 in Week 11. On November 25, 2018, LaCosse made three receptions for 34-yards and scored his first career touchdown during a 24–17 victory against the Pittsburgh Steelers in Week 12. He caught his first career touchdown reception on a ten-yard pass by Broncos quarterback Case Keenum during the second quarter.

LaCosse did not receive a contract tender from the Broncos after the 2018 season, allowing him to become an unrestricted free agent.

=== New England Patriots ===
On March 14, 2019, LaCosse signed a two-year contract with the New England Patriots worth $4.8 million.

With the retirement of Patriots tight end Rob Gronkowski in the offseason, and recently signed Benjamin Watson entering the year under a four-game suspension, LaCosse assumed a significant role in New England's offense. Following Watson's subsequent release after his suspension, LaCosse officially assumed the starting tight end role in the Bill Belichick- and Josh McDaniels-led offense. He caught 13 passes for 131 yards and one touchdown in 2019.

On August 2, 2020, LaCosse announced he would opt out of the 2020 season due to the COVID-19 pandemic.

On August 31, 2021, he was released by the Patriots. He was signed to the practice squad the following day.

On July 12, 2022, LaCosse announced his retirement from professional football.
