= Johnathan Hankins =

American football player (born 1992)

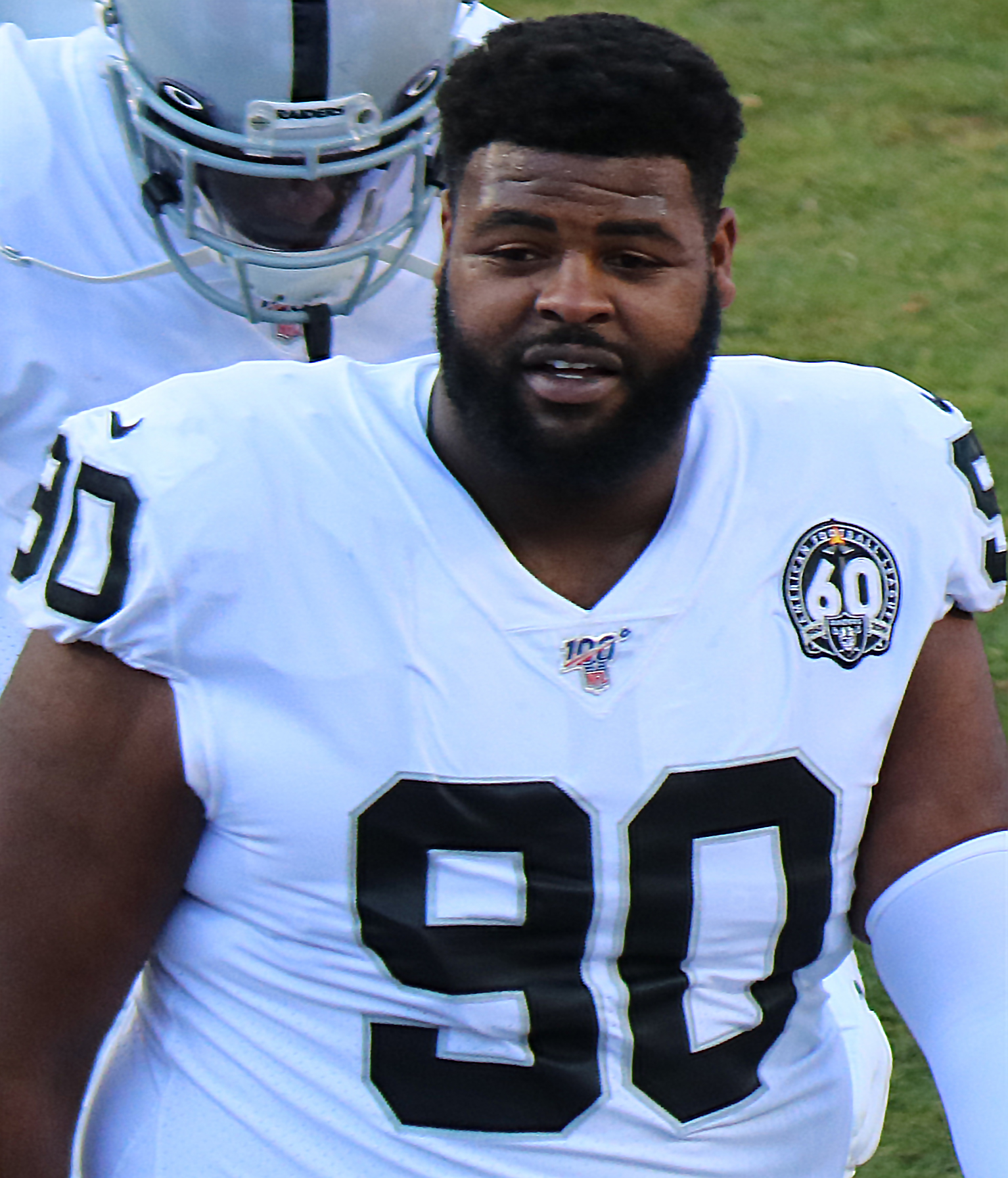
- Hankins with the Oakland Raiders in 2019

No. 95, 90, 97
- Position: Defensive tackle

Personal information
- Born: March 30, 1992 (age 34); Dearborn Heights, Michigan, U.S.
- Listed height: 6 ft 3 in (1.91 m)
- Listed weight: 335 lb (152 kg)

Career information
- High school: Southeastern (Detroit, Michigan)
- College: Ohio State (2010–2012)
- NFL draft: 2013: 2nd round, 49th overall pick

Career history
- New York Giants (2013–2016); Indianapolis Colts (2017); Oakland / Las Vegas Raiders (2018–2022); Dallas Cowboys (2022–2023); Seattle Seahawks (2024–2025)

Awards and highlights
- First-team All-American (2012); First-team All-Big Ten (2012)

Career NFL statistics
- Total tackles: 433
- Sacks: 17.5
- Forced fumbles: 3
- Fumble recoveries: 3
- Pass deflections: 13
- Interceptions: 1
- Stats at Pro Football Reference

Johnathan Hankins (born March 30, 1992) is an American former professional football player who was a defensive tackle in the National Football League (NFL). He played college football for the Ohio State Buckeyes, where he received All-American honors, and was selected by the New York Giants in the second round of the 2013 NFL draft. He also played for the Indianapolis Colts, Oakland / Las Vegas Raiders, and Dallas Cowboys.

== Early life ==
Hankins was born in Dearborn Heights, Michigan. He began his high school football career as a 255 pound guard in his freshman year.

For his sophomore year he transferred to Southeastern High School, where he started on the defensive line. Five-star prospect William Gholston transferred to Southeastern in 2008, creating the "best defense in Detroit", with Hankins shutting down the inside and Gholston patrolling on the edge.

Hankins was regarded as a three star recruit by Rivals.com, and was listed as the No. 20 prospect from Michigan in the class of 2010. He intended to accompany Gholston to Michigan State, but did not get any offer from the Spartans. Hankins eventually picked Ohio State over offers from Alabama, Florida, Michigan, Oklahoma, and Wisconsin.

== College career ==
Hankins enrolled in Ohio State University, where he played for the Buckeyes from 2010 to 2012. As a true freshman, Hankins made the Buckeyes rotation and recorded 16 tackles (3 solo) plus a quarterback sack for the season. He weighed in as a freshman "at about 350, 355," and was regarded as only a two-down player by defensive coordinator Jim Heacock.

By his sophomore year, Hankins managed to get his weight down to 330 and became a starter, registering 67 tackles (32 solo) and three sacks.

Following his 2012 junior season, he was a first-team All-Big Ten Conference selection, and received first-team All-American honors from Scout.com.

== Professional career ==
=== Pre-draft ===
Even though Hankins only entered his junior season in 2012, he was projected to leave Ohio State early. In preseason mock drafts from May 2012, Hankins was listed as a mid first-rounder for the 2013 NFL draft. By mid-season, he had moved up to a top-10 spot. In December 2012, Hankins announced that he would forgo his final year of eligibility, entering the 2013 NFL Draft.

Pre-draft measurables
Height	Weight	Arm length	Hand span	40-yard dash	10-yard split	20-yard split	20-yard shuttle	Three-cone drill	Vertical jump	Broad jump
6 ft 2 7/8 in (1.90 m)	320 lb (145 kg)	33 in (0.84 m)	9 1/2 in (0.24 m)	5.31 s	1.85 s	3.10 s	4.61 s	7.59 s	26 in (0.66 m)	8 ft 8 in (2.64 m)
All values from NFL Combine

=== New York Giants ===
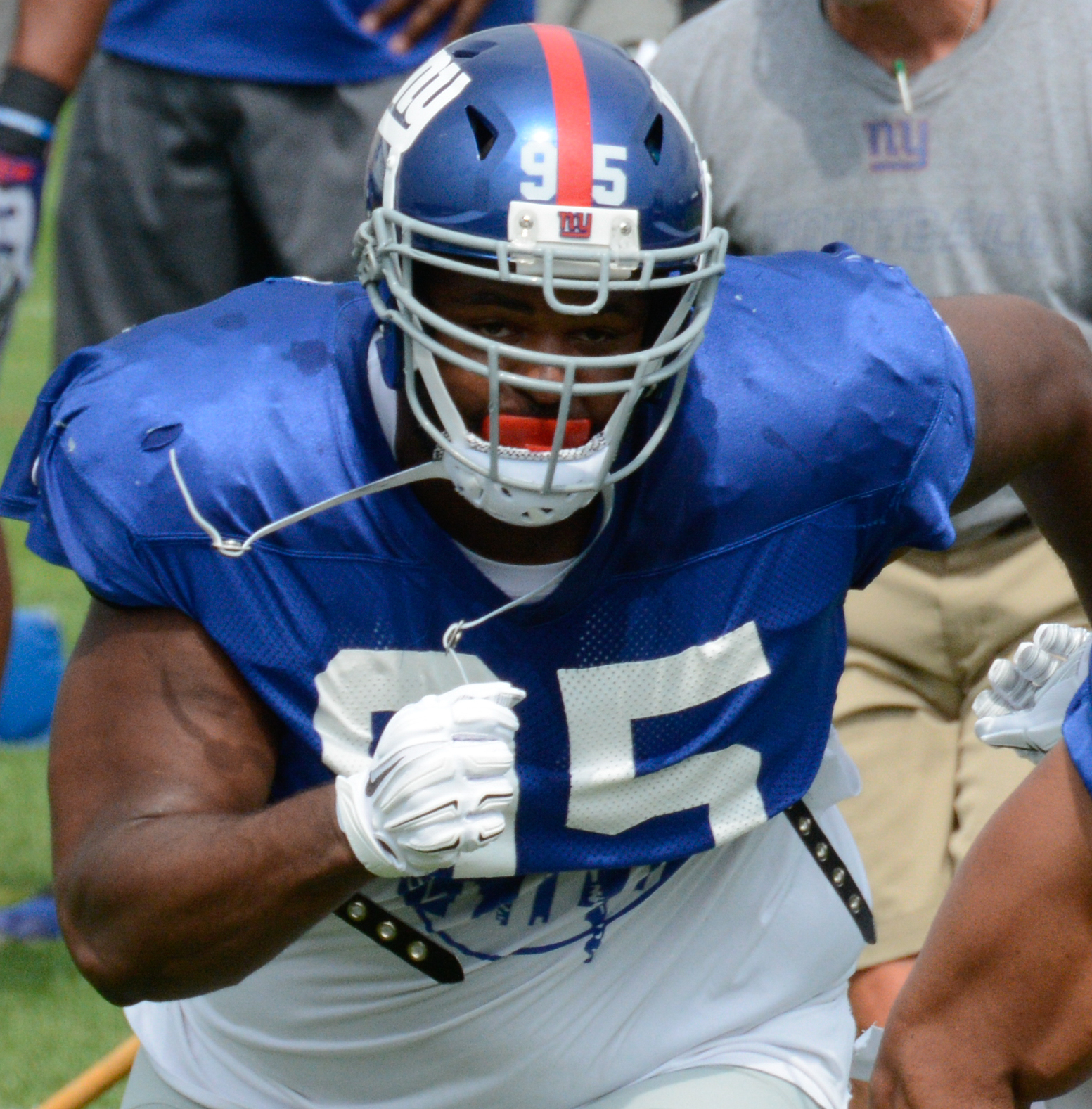
Hankins with the Giants in 2016

Hankins was selected by the New York Giants in the second round (49th overall) of the 2013 NFL draft.

After Linval Joseph left the Giants for the Minnesota Vikings, Hankins was expected to step into his role in 2014. Known as a run stuffer, Hankins surprisingly showed flashes as a pass rusher recording seven sacks, six quarterback hits, and 21 hurries. Hankins exceeded expectations as he recorded 51 tackles, seven sacks, and a forced fumble, and was named to Pro Football Focus' All-Pro Team at defensive tackle.

On November 8, 2015, Hankins tore his pectoral muscle during the second quarter of the team's Week 9 game against the Tampa Bay Buccaneers. He was placed on season-ending injured reserve the following day.

In the 2016 season, Hankins returned from his injury, registering 43 tackles and three sacks. He also made the playoffs for the first time in his career.

=== Indianapolis Colts ===
On April 13, 2017, Hankins signed a three-year, $30 million contract with the Indianapolis Colts. He started 15 games, recording 44 tackles (fifth on the team), four tackles for loss, two sacks, and three passes defensed. Hankins logged four tackles and one sack against the Seattle Seahawks. He recorded eight tackles against the Buffalo Bills, and had five tackles and one sack against the Denver Broncos.

On March 17, 2018, Hankins was released by the Colts, because he wasn't seen as a fit for the 4-3 defense thas was implemented by new defensive coordinator Matt Eberflus.

=== Oakland / Las Vegas Raiders ===
On September 13, 2018, Hankins signed with the Oakland Raiders to replace an injured Justin Ellis. He played in 15 games for Oakland (including 14 starts), recording 36 tackles and two fumble recoveries. Hankins posted two tackles and two fumble recoveries against the Cleveland Browns.

On March 10, 2019, Hankins signed a two-year contract extension to return to the Raiders. He started all 16 games, collecting 50 tackles, 1.5 sacks, and one pass defensed. Hankins recorded eight tackles against the Minnesota Vikings, and posted four tackles with one sack against the Houston Texans.

In 2020, Hankins started all 16 games, compiling 48 tackles, one sack, and one fumble recovery. He was placed on the reserve/COVID-19 list by the Raiders on November 18, 2020, and activated three days later.

On March 20, 2021, the Raiders re-signed Hankins to a one-year, $3.5 million contract. He started 14 games, registering 38 tackles and one pass defensed while missing three games with an injury.

Hankins re-signed with the Raiders on April 4, 2022. However, he was later passed on the depth chart by Andrew Billings. Hankins was declared inactive in the Week 5 game against the Kansas City Chiefs. He appeared in five games (including one start), tallying nine tackles with one quarterback pressure and one pass defensed.

=== Dallas Cowboys ===
On October 25, 2022, Hankins along with a 2024 seventh-round pick, was traded to the Dallas Cowboys in exchange for a 2023 sixth-round draft choice (#204-Jarrick Bernard-Converse). He was acquired to improve the team's run defense. Hankins was placed on injured reserve with a sprained pectoral muscle on December 14, and was activated on January 16, 2023.

Hankins re-signed with the Cowboys on March 29, 2023. He started 14 games, recording 27 tackles, three sacks, and two passes defensed. Hankins missed three games with a high-ankle sprain.

=== Seattle Seahawks ===
On March 20, 2024, Hankins signed with the Seattle Seahawks. He reunited with defensive coordinator Aden Durde, who was his defensive line coach with the Dallas Cowboys.

On May 7, 2025, Hankins re-signed with the Seahawks. On November 19, Seahawks head coach Mike Macdonald announced that Hankins would not play during the season due to a back injury suffered in the offseason. On December 3, he was released by the Seahawks.

On April 29, 2026, Hankins announced in an interview that he would be retiring from professional football.

== NFL career statistics ==
Legend
**Bold**	Career high

=== Regular season ===
Year	Team	Games		Tackles					Interceptions					Fumbles			
Year	Team	GP	GS	Cmb	Solo	Ast	Sck	TFL	Int	Yds	TD	Lng	PD	FF	FR	Yds	TD
2013	NYG	11	0	16	9	7	0.0	2	0	0	0	0	0	0	0	0	0
2014	NYG	**16**	**16**	**51**	**30**	21	**7.0**	**8**	0	0	0	0	**3**	**1**	0	0	0
2015	NYG	9	9	30	21	9	0.0	1	0	0	0	0	1	**1**	0	0	0
2016	NYG	**16**	**16**	43	29	14	3.0	**8**	0	0	0	0	0	**1**	0	0	0
2017	IND	15	15	44	24	20	2.0	4	0	0	0	0	**3**	0	0	0	0
2018	OAK	15	14	36	21	15	0.0	4	0	0	0	0	0	0	**2**	0	0
2019	OAK	**16**	**16**	50	28	22	1.5	7	0	0	0	0	1	0	0	0	0
2020	LVR	**16**	**16**	48	27	21	1.0	1	0	0	0	0	0	0	1	0	0
2021	LVR	14	14	38	15	**23**	0.0	1	0	0	0	0	1	0	0	0	0
2022	LVR	5	1	10	0	10	0.0	0	0	0	0	0	1	0	0	0	0
2022	DAL	5	3	10	7	3	0.0	1	0	0	0	0	0	0	0	0	0
2023	DAL	14	14	27	13	14	3.0	2	0	0	0	0	2	0	0	0	0
2024	SEA	17	8	30	15	15	1.0	0	1	0	0	0	0	0	0	0	0
		169	142	433	239	194	18.5	39	1	0	0	0	12	3	3	0	0

=== Playoffs ===
Year	Team	Games		Tackles					Interceptions					Fumbles			
Year	Team	GP	GS	Cmb	Solo	Ast	Sck	TFL	Int	Yds	TD	Lng	PD	FF	FR	Yds	TD
2016	NYG	1	**1**	3	2	1	**1.0**	**1**	0	0	0	0	0	0	0	0	0
2021	LVR	1	**1**	3	1	2	0.0	0	0	0	0	0	0	0	0	0	0
2022	DAL	**2**	0	**5**	**4**	1	**1.0**	**1**	0	0	0	0	0	0	0	0	0
2023	DAL	1	**1**	4	1	**3**	0.0	0	0	0	0	0	0	0	0	0	0
		5	3	15	8	7	2.0	2	0	0	0	0	0	0	0	0	0
