= Eli Apple =

American football player (born 1995)

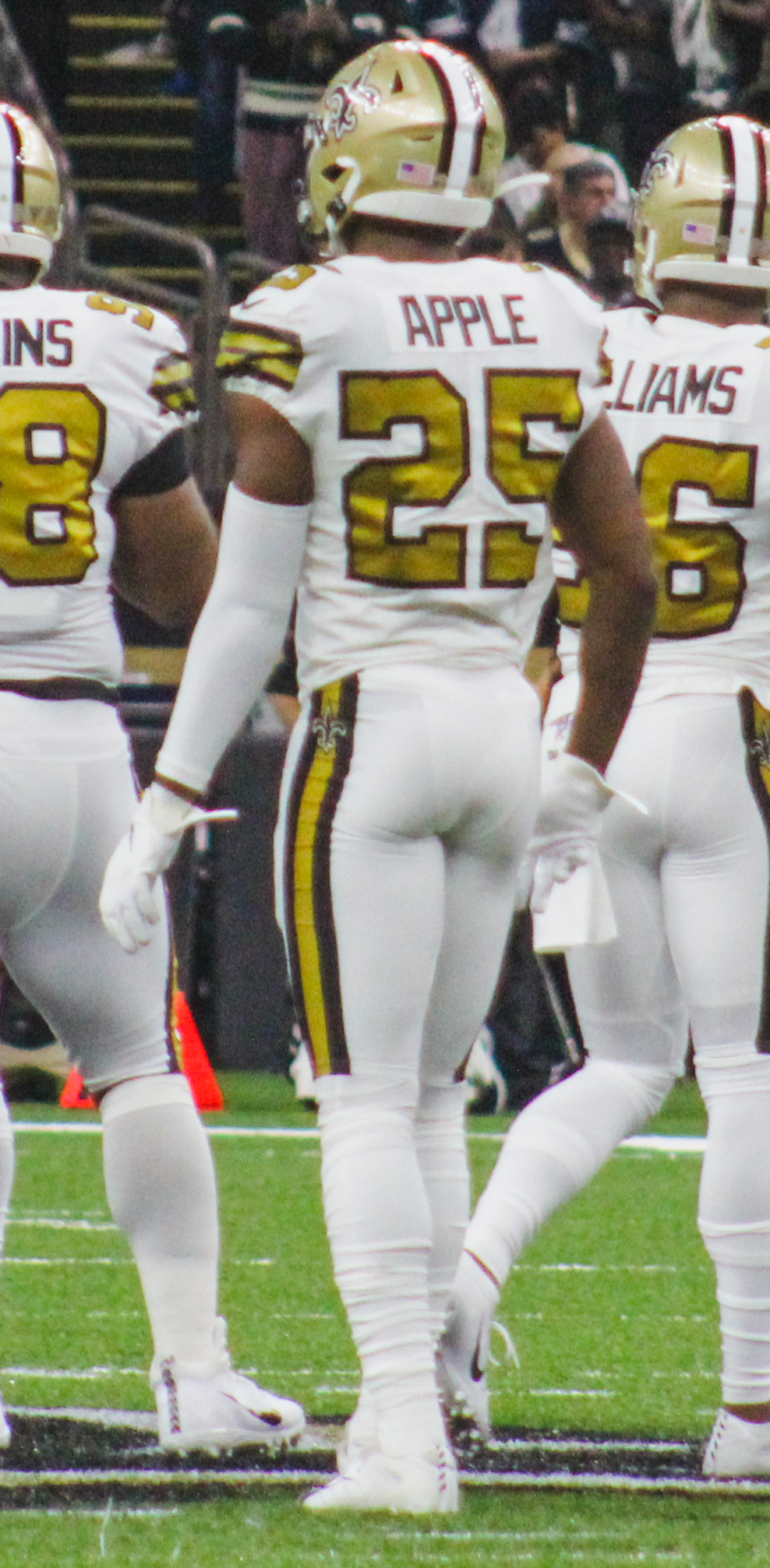
- Apple with the New Orleans Saints in 2019

Profile
- Position: Cornerback

Personal information
- Born: August 9, 1995 (age 31); Philadelphia, Pennsylvania, U.S.
- Listed height: 6 ft 1 in (1.85 m)
- Listed weight: 203 lb (92 kg)

Career information
- High school: Eastern Regional (Voorhees Township, New Jersey)
- College: Ohio State (2013–2015)
- NFL draft: 2016: 1st round, 10th overall pick

Career history
- New York Giants (2016–2018); New Orleans Saints (2018–2019); Carolina Panthers (2020); Cincinnati Bengals (2021–2022); Miami Dolphins (2023); Los Angeles Chargers (2024); San Francisco 49ers (2025)

Awards and highlights
- CFP national champion (2015); Second-team All-Big Ten (2015)

Career NFL statistics as of 2025
- Total tackles: 384
- Sacks: 0.5
- Forced fumbles: 3
- Fumble recoveries: 7
- Pass deflections: 61
- Interceptions: 6
- Stats at Pro Football Reference

Eli Apple (né Woodard, born August 9, 1995) is an American professional football cornerback. He played college football for the Ohio State Buckeyes, winning the 2015 National Championship before being selected by the New York Giants in the first round of the 2016 NFL draft.

== Early life ==
Apple, born Eli Woodard, was born to a Ghanaian mother and lived 2 years in the country. He attended Eastern Regional High School in Voorhees, New Jersey. Apple was rated the top prospect in New Jersey in the 2013 class by Rivals.com and was ranked the 28th best prospect nationally. He received about twenty scholarship offers, including offers from Alabama, California, Virginia Tech, Boston College, Wisconsin, Tennessee, Purdue, Miami, Georgia Tech, Maryland, Michigan, Ole Miss, Nebraska, North Carolina, NC State, and Clemson and ranked his top three schools as Rutgers, Ohio State, and Notre Dame. On February 12, 2012, he announced his verbal commitment to Ohio State after Rutgers head coach Greg Schiano left for the Tampa Bay Buccaneers.

== College career ==
Apple enrolled at Ohio State in January 2013 as a five-star prospect (ESPN 150) and was rated as high as the No. 11 prospect nationally on the ESPN 150. He was also rated as the No. 1 overall prospect in New Jersey and No. 6 cornerback prospect nationally by 247sports. He redshirted as a true freshman and went on to play in 2014 as a redshirt freshman. He played in the 2015 Sugar Bowl and the 2015 College Football Playoff National Championship. In his second season with the Buckeyes, he was the Defensive MVP. In the National Championship Game, Apple intercepted Oregon quarterback Marcus Mariota on the games final play. This interception prevented Mariota from clinching the all-time lowest interception record, which had stood until that moment.

== Professional career ==
=== Pre-draft ===
External videos
- Eli Apple's NFL Combine Workout
- Eli Apple runs the 40-yard dash
- Eli Apple makes one-handed grab at combine

On January 4, 2016, Apple announced his decision to forgo his remaining eligibility and enter the 2016 NFL draft. Apple attended the NFL Scouting Combine and completed the majority of combine drills before suffering cramps. He finished with the tenth fastest time in the 40-yard dash among all participating players at the NFL Combine.

On March 11, 2016, Apple attended Ohio State's pro day, but opted to stand on his combine numbers and only performed the short shuttle, three-cone drill, and positional drills. Apple had pre-draft visits with multiple teams, including the Buffalo Bills, San Francisco 49ers, and Tennessee Titans. At the conclusion of the pre-draft process, Apple was projected to be an early to mid-first round pick by NFL draft experts and scouts. He was ranked the third best cornerback prospect in the draft by DraftScout.com, was ranked the fourth best cornerback by NFL analyst Mike Mayock, and was ranked the sixth best defensive back by Sports Illustrated.

Pre-draft measurables
Height	Weight	Arm length	Hand span	Wingspan	40-yard dash	10-yard split	20-yard split	20-yard shuttle	Three-cone drill	Bench press	Wonderlic
6 ft 0 5/8 in (1.84 m)	199 lb (90 kg)	31 3/8 in (0.80 m)	9 3/8 in (0.24 m)	6 ft 4 3/8 in (1.94 m)	4.40 s	1.53 s	2.59 s	4.08 s	7.00 s	13 reps	21
All values from NFL Combine/Ohio State's Pro Day

=== New York Giants ===
==== 2016 NFL draft ====
The New York Giants selected Apple in the first round (10th overall) of the 2016 NFL draft. Apple was the second cornerback drafted in 2016, after Jalen Ramsey (5th overall). It was reported that the Giants had initially planned to draft linebacker Leonard Floyd or offensive tackle Jack Conklin. However, circumstances changed after Laremy Tunsil unexpectedly fell out of the top ten. The Titans traded ahead of the Giants to draft Jack Conklin (8th overall) and the Chicago Bears traded ahead of the Giants to select Leonard Floyd (9th overall). Giants' General Manager Jerry Reese opted to keep the tenth overall pick and selected Apple who was their highest graded player available on their draft board without any issues or injuries. Draft analysts and fans criticized the selection of Apple as many deemed it to be a reach.

External videos
- Giants draft Eli Apple 10th overall
- NFL Draft Profile: Eli Apple

==== 2016 season ====
On May 6, 2016, the New York Giants signed Apple to a fully guaranteed four-year, $15.15 million that includes a signing bonus of $9.21 million.

Apple entered training camp slated as the third cornerback on the depth chart behind veterans Janoris Jenkins and Dominique Rodgers-Cromartie. Head coach Ben McAdoo named Apple the third cornerback on the depth chart to begin the regular season and first-team nickelback.

He made his professional regular season debut in the Giants' season-opener at the Dallas Cowboys and recorded four solo tackles during their 20–19 victory. On September 25, 2016, Apple earned his first career start and recorded one solo tackle in a 29–27 loss to the Washington Redskins, but left the game in the second quarter after suffering a hamstring injury. Apple was inactive for the Giants Week 4 loss at the Minnesota Vikings with a hamstring injury. He was also sidelined for their Week 6 win against the Baltimore Ravens due to a groin injury. On November 7, 2016, he started his second game in a row and made four solo tackles against the Philadelphia Eagles but was benched in favor of Trevin Wade as the Giants won 28–23. On November 14, 2016, Apple started his first game at outside corner, with Rodgers-Cromartie covering the slot and made one solo tackle in a 21–20 victory over the Cincinnati Bengals. In Week 11, Apple collected a season-high nine combined tackles in a 22–16 victory over the Bears. On December 4, 2016, Apple recorded five combined tackles, broke up two passes, recovered a fumble, and made his first career interception in the Giants' 24–14 loss at the Pittsburgh Steelers in Week 13. Apple intercepted a pass attempt by Steelers' quarterback Ben Roethlisberger, which was originally intended for wide receiver Eli Rogers, during the third quarter. Apple started the last ten games of the season and finished his rookie season in 2016 with 51 combined tackles (41 solo), seven pass deflections, one interception, and a forced fumble in 14 games and 11 starts.

==== 2017 season ====
Apple entered training camp slated as a starting outside cornerback. Head coach Ben McAdoo named Apple and Janoris Jenkins the starting outside cornerbacks to begin the regular season with Dominique Rodgers-Cromartie as the starting slot cornerback.

He started the Giants' season-opening 19–3 loss to the Cowboys and made seven combined tackles and a pass deflection. Apple was benched for the majority of the Giants' Week 5 loss to the Los Angeles Chargers due to disciplinary reasons. On October 15, 2017, Apple recorded five solo tackles and a career-high three pass deflections, helping the Giants gain their first victory of the season over the Denver Broncos. Apple was heavily criticized by the New York Giants coaching staff for his performance during their Week 10 loss at the 49ers. As a result of his performance, Apple was benched as a healthy scratch for the next four games (Weeks 11–14). On December 4, 2017, the New York Giants fired head coach Ben McAdoo after they fell to a 2–10 record. Defensive coordinator Steve Spagnuolo was named the interim head coach for the last four games. In Week 14, Apple was disciplined after posting on Twitter while on the sidelines of the Giants' Week 14 loss to the Cowboys. He also aggravated teammates by posting a comment after the game which stated former Ohio State teammate and Cowboys fullback Rod Smith "iced the New York Giants" after scoring two touchdowns during the fourth quarter. In Week 15, he returned as a backup cornerback and collected a season-high nine combined tackles during a 34–29 loss to the Eagles.

On December 20, 2017, it was reported that tensions between Apple and his teammates had reached an all-time high, with Giants' safety Landon Collins saying Apple was a "cancer" and should not be on the team in 2018. On December 27, 2017, Apple was suspended by the team for the 2017 season finale after reportedly getting into an argument with coaching staff about being asked to practice with the scout team and for a "pattern of behavior that is conduct detrimental to the team". Apple finished the 2017 NFL season with 49 combined tackles (41 solo) and eight pass deflections in 11 games and seven starts.

==== 2018 season ====
The Giants' new coach, Pat Shurmur, said about Apple that he "believe[d] in a clean slate". Apple was to be a starting cornerback alongside safeties Landon Collins and Curtis Riley. On September 16, 2018, Apple recorded one tackle before exiting in the third quarter of the Giants' 20–13 loss at the Cowboys due to a groin injury. His injury sidelined him for the next two games (Weeks 3–4). In Week 6, he collected eight combined tackles and recorded a season-high three pass deflections during a 34–13 loss to the Eagles.

=== New Orleans Saints ===
On October 23, 2018, the New York Giants traded Apple to the New Orleans Saints for a fourth round pick (132nd overall) in the 2019 NFL draft and a seventh round pick in the 2020 NFL draft. The Saints traded for Apple in order to add him to their depleted secondary. Cornerback Patrick Robinson was placed on injured reserve after breaking his ankle in Week 3 and cornerback Ken Crawley sustained an injury to his oblique the day before the trade. Head coach Sean Payton immediately named Apple a starting cornerback, reuniting him with former Ohio State secondary teammates Marshon Lattimore and Vonn Bell. On October 28, Apple made his Saints debut and collected nine solo tackles in a 30–20 win at the Minnesota Vikings in Week 8. On November 11, Apple recorded his first interception with the Saints in a 51–14 victory over the Cincinnati Bengals.

On May 1, 2019, the Saints declined the fifth-year option on Apple's contract. He started 15 games in 2019, recording 58 tackles, four passes defensed, and a forced fumble. During the 2020 free agency period, Apple was set to sign with the Las Vegas Raiders before the deal fell through.

=== Carolina Panthers ===
On May 29, 2020, Apple signed a one-year, $3 million contract with the Carolina Panthers. He was placed on injured reserve on September 7, with ankle and foot injuries. Apple was activated on October 3. He was released by the team on October 27.

=== Cincinnati Bengals ===
On March 23, 2021, Apple signed a one-year, $1.2 million contract with the Bengals. In 18 games (regular season and postseason) as a starter in 2021, Apple recorded 49 tackles, two interceptions, and a fumble recovery. Following Super Bowl LVI, Apple became a subject of scrutiny and mockery for allowing Cooper Kupp to score the Rams' game winning touchdown late in the fourth quarter. He had previously trash talked and trolled other players on social media, notably Kansas City Chiefs wide receivers Tyreek Hill and Mecole Hardman, who had lost to Apple and the Bengals in the AFC Championship Game two weeks prior.

Apple re-signed with the Bengals on a one-year, $3.75 million contract on March 19, 2022. In the 2022 season, Apple recorded 49 total tackles and eight passes defended in 15 games and starts.

=== Miami Dolphins ===
On July 29, 2023, Apple signed a one-year, $1.6 million contract with the Miami Dolphins, after starting cornerback Jalen Ramsey suffered a knee injury. In the 2023 season, he finished with a half-sack, 46 tackles, one interception, and nine passes defended.

=== Los Angeles Chargers ===
On October 15, 2024, Apple was signed to the Los Angeles Chargers practice squad. He was promoted to the active roster on November 25. On November 27, Apple was placed on injured reserve after he suffered a hamstring injury in the Week 12 matchup against the Baltimore Ravens. He was activated on January 10, 2025.

=== San Francisco 49ers ===
On July 28, 2025, Apple was signed to the San Francisco 49ers. He was released by San Francisco on August 7 and was re-signed to the team's practice squad on August 27.

On January 20, 2026, Apple signed a reserve/futures contract with San Francisco. Apple was waived by the 49ers on August 2, but was re-signed by the team on August 12. On August 30, Apple was released by the 49ers as a part of final roster cuts before the start of the regular season.

== NFL career statistics ==
Legend
**Bold**	Career high

Year	Team	Games		Tackles					Interceptions						Fumbles				
Year	Team	GP	GS	Cmb	Solo	Ast	Sck	TFL	Int	Yds	Avg	Lng	TD	PD	FF	Fum	FR	Yds	TD
2016	NYG	14	11	51	41	10	0.0	**4**	1	0	0.0	0	0	7	**1**	0	**2**	0	0
2017	NYG	11	7	49	41	8	0.0	0	0	0	0.0	0	0	8	0	0	**2**	0	0
2018	NYG	5	5	23	20	3	0.0	0	0	0	0.0	0	0	5	**1**	0	1	0	0
2018	NO	10	10	52	42	10	0.0	0	**2**	29	14.5	29	0	9	0	0	1	**2**	0
2019	NO	15	15	**58**	**53**	5	0.0	0	0	0	0.0	0	0	4	**1**	0	0	0	0
2020	CAR	2	0	4	3	1	0.0	0	0	0	0.0	0	0	0	0	0	0	0	0
2021	CIN	16	15	49	38	**11**	0.0	2	**2**	**50**	**25.0**	**50**	0	**10**	0	**1**	1	0	0
2022	CIN	15	15	49	35	14	0.0	1	0	0	0.0	0	0	8	0	0	0	0	0
2023	MIA	10	4	46	37	9	**0.5**	0	1	8	8.0	8	0	9	0	0	0	0	0
2024	LAC	4	0	2	2	0	0.0	0	0	0	0.0	0	0	1	0	0	0	0	0
2025	SF	2	0	1	1	0	0.0	0	0	0	0.0	0	0	0	0	0	0	0	0
Total		104	82	384	313	71	0.5	7	6	87	14.5	50	0	61	3	1	7	2	0

=== Postseason ===
Year	Team	Games		Tackles					Interceptions						Fumbles				
Year	Team	GP	GS	Cmb	Solo	Ast	Sck	TFL	Int	Yds	Avg	Lng	TD	PD	FF	Fum	FR	Yds	TD
2016	NYG	1	1	4	4	0	0.0	0	0	0	0.0	0	0	1	0	0	0	0	0
2018	NO	2	2	8	7	1	0.0	0	0	0	0.0	0	0	1	0	0	0	0	0
2021	CIN	4	4	**21**	**15**	**6**	0.0	0	0	0	0.0	0	0	**3**	0	0	0	0	0
2022	CIN	3	3	18	**15**	3	0.0	**1**	0	0	0.0	0	0	1	0	0	0	0	0
2023	MIA	1	1	5	5	0	0.0	**1**	0	0	0.0	0	0	0	0	0	0	0	0
2024	LAC	1	0	0	0	0	0.0	0	0	0	0.0	0	0	0	0	0	0	0	0
Career		12	11	56	46	10	0.0	2	0	0	0.0	0	0	6	0	0	0	0	0

== Personal life ==
Apple was born in Philadelphia, Pennsylvania and was raised by his mother Annie Apple and stepfather Tim Apple in Voorhees Township, New Jersey. He is also the nephew of actor and comedian Michael Blackson. In 2012, he changed his name from Eli Woodard to Eli Apple.
