= Trevin Wade =

American football player (born 1989)

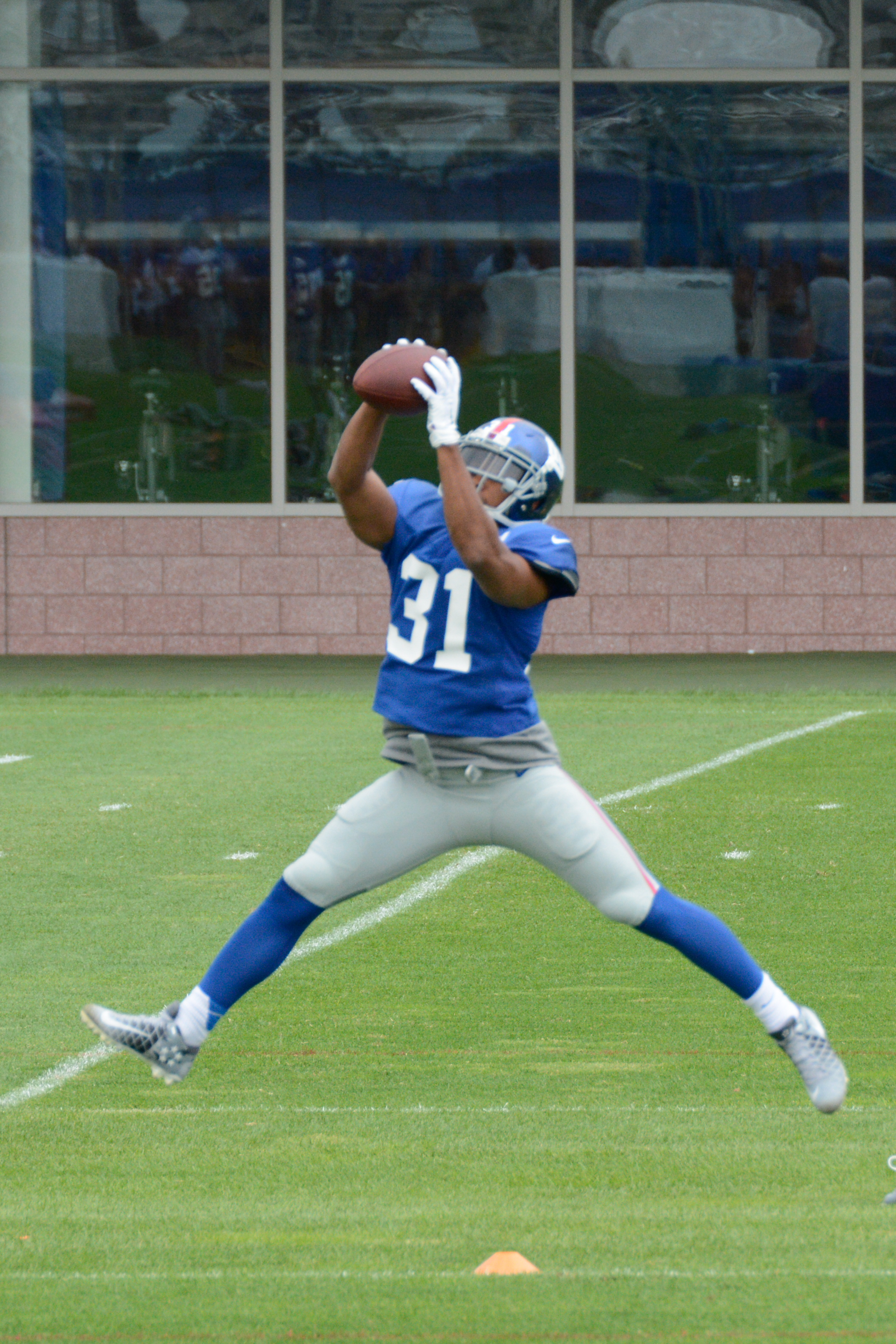
- Wade with the New York Giants in 2016

No. 26, 30, 31
- Position: Cornerback

Personal information
- Born: August 1, 1989 (age 37); Austin, Texas, U.S.
- Listed height: 5 ft 10 in (1.78 m)
- Listed weight: 190 lb (86 kg)

Career information
- High school: Stony Point (Round Rock, Texas)
- College: Arizona
- NFL draft: 2012: 7th round, 245th overall pick

Career history
- Cleveland Browns (2012); New Orleans Saints (2013–2014); Detroit Lions (2014)*; New York Giants (2015–2016); Baltimore Ravens (2017)*
- * Offseason or practice squad member only

Awards and highlights
- 2× Second-team All-Pac-12 (2009, 2011)

Career NFL statistics
- Total tackles: 95
- Forced fumbles: 1
- Fumble recoveries: 4
- Pass deflections: 11
- Defensive touchdowns: 2
- Stats at Pro Football Reference

Trevin Wade (born August 1, 1989) is an American former professional football player who was a cornerback in the National Football League (NFL). He was selected by the Cleveland Browns in the seventh round of the 2012 NFL draft. He played college football for the Arizona Wildcats.

== Early life ==
Wade was born in Austin, Texas. In fifth grade he moved to Round Rock, Texas, where he attended Stony Point High School, playing football (including a stint at quarterback as well as other positions on both offense and defense) and basketball. Baseball player Hubie Brooks is his distant cousin.

== College career ==
Wade attended the University of Arizona from 2007 to 2011. He finished his career with 182 tackles, 12 interceptions and two touchdowns.

== Professional career ==
=== Pre-draft ===
Coming out of Arizona, Wade was projected to be a third round pick by the majority of NFL draft experts and scouts. He received an invitation to the NFL combine and completed nearly all of the combine and positional drills, choosing to only skip the 20-yard dash. His 40-yard dash was the 19th fastest time out of the 34 cornerbacks at the combine and his bench press was the 10th best performance out of the 19 cornerbacks who participated. Wade was ranked the 12th best cornerback prospect in the draft by NFLDraftScout.com and the 25th best cornerback prospect by Walterfootball.com.

Pre-draft measurables
Height	Weight	Arm length	Hand span	40-yard dash	10-yard split	20-yard split	20-yard shuttle	Three-cone drill	Vertical jump	Broad jump	Bench press
5 ft 10 3/8 in (1.79 m)	192 lb (87 kg)	30 3/4 in (0.78 m)	8 5/8 in (0.22 m)	4.59 s	1.63 s	2.53 s	4.00 s	6.87 s	34.5 in (0.88 m)	9 ft 8 in (2.95 m)	18 reps
All values from NFL Combine

=== Cleveland Browns ===
The Cleveland Browns selected Wade in the seventh round (245th overall) of the 2012 NFL draft.

He competed with Buster Skrine, Dimitri Patterson, James Dockery, Tashaun Gipson, and Antwaun Reed for the Brown's third cornerback position throughout his first training camp. Wade was named the Cleveland Brown's fifth cornerback on the depth chart to begin the regular season, behind Joe Haden, Sheldon Brown, Dimitri Patterson, and Buster Skrine.

On September 16, 2012, he made his professional regular season debut, recording two combined tackle during a 27-34 loss to the Cincinnati Bengals. On November 18, 2012, Wade collected a season-high four combined tackles as the Browns were defeated by the Dallas Cowboys 20-23. He played in 13 games for the Browns in 2012, finishing with a total of 17 combined tackles (12 solo) and one pass deflection. He was released on August 28, 2013.

=== New Orleans Saints ===
On November 18, 2013, the New Orleans Saints signed Wade to their active roster after Jabari Greer and Patrick Robinson were both placed on injured-reserve for the season. On December 22, 2013, he made his season debut as the Saints were defeated by the Carolina Panthers 17-13. Wade appeared in only two regular season games during the season and finished without recording a stat.

After finishing with an 11-5 record, Wade appeared in the first playoff game of his career. On January 4, 2014, he made one combined tackle during the Saint's 26-24 NFC Wildcard game victory over the Philadelphia Eagles. He was waived on September 17, 2014.

=== Detroit Lions ===
On November 3, 2014, the Detroit Lions signed Wade to their practice squad. He spent the entire season on the practice squad.

=== New York Giants ===
On January 13, 2015, the New York Giants signed him to a reserve/future contract.

Wade competed with Chykie Brown, Jayron Hosley, Trumaine McBride, Bennett Jackson, Mike Harris, Chandler Fenner, and Josh Gordy for a backup cornerback position. He was named the Giant's third cornerback on their depth chart behind Dominique Rodgers-Cromartie and Prince Amukamara.

He made his New York Giant's debut in their season-opening 26-27 loss to the Dallas Cowboys and recorded one tackle. On October 19, 2015, Wade earned his first career start in place of Prince Amukamara, who suffered a pectoral injury. He collected six combined tackle during the Giant's 7-27 loss to the Philadelphia Eagles. The next game, Wade earned a career-high seven combined tackles in a 27-20 victory over the Cowboys. On December 6, 2015, he earned his second career start and recorded a career-high six solo tackles in a 20-23 overtime loss to the New York Jets. He played in all 16 games with three starts, recording a career-high 52 tackles and six passes deflected during the 2015 season.

He returned in 2016 and competed with Tramain Jacobs, Bennett Jackson, Leon McFadden, Michael Hunter, Matt Smalley, and Donte Deayon. Head coach Ben McAdoo named Wade the fourth cornerback on the New York Giant's depth chart to begin the regular season, behind Janoris Jenkins, Dominique Rodgers-Cromartie, and Eli Apple. Wade earned his first start of the season during a Week 4 loss to the Minnesota Vikings and recorded six solo tackles. The New York Giants earned a playoff berth after finishing the 2016 season with an 11-5 record. On January 8, 2017, Wade collected two combined tackles, as the Giant's were defeated 13-38 by the Green Bay Packers in the NFC Wildcard game. He finished the season with 26 combined tackle (24 solo) and three pass deflections in 16 games and two starts.

=== Baltimore Ravens ===
On August 7, 2017, Wade signed with the Baltimore Ravens. On September 1, 2017, he was released by the Ravens during final roster cuts.
