= Will Tye =

American football player (born 1991)

No. 45, 82
- Position: Tight end

Personal information
- Born: November 4, 1991 (age 35); Middletown, Connecticut, U.S.
- Listed height: 6 ft 2 in (1.88 m)
- Listed weight: 260 lb (118 kg)

Career information
- High school: Salisbury School (Salisbury, Connecticut)
- College: Florida State (2010–2012); Stony Brook (2013–2014)
- NFL draft: 2015: undrafted

Career history
- New York Giants (2015–2016); New York Jets (2017); New England Patriots (2017–2018)*; Philadelphia Eagles (2018–2019)*
- * Offseason or practice squad member only

Awards and highlights
- PFWA All-Rookie Team (2015)

Career NFL statistics
- Receptions: 94
- Receiving yards: 897
- Receiving touchdowns: 4
- Stats at Pro Football Reference

Wilhelm Tye (born November 4, 1991) is an American former professional football player who was a tight end in the National Football League (NFL). He played college football for the Florida State Seminoles and Stony Brook Seawolves, and signed with the New York Giants in 2015 as an undrafted free agent. Tye was the first player from Stony Brook to reach the NFL and played two seasons for the Giants and one for the New York Jets.

== Early life ==
Originally from Middletown, Connecticut, Tye was a standout tight end/kick returner at Xavier High School in Middletown. Tye then did his final year of high school at Salisbury School in Salisbury, Connecticut, where he was labeled a three-star recruit by Rivals and Scout.com and was recognized as the No. 6 prospect in Connecticut and No. 19 tight end in the nation by the latter.

== College career ==
Tye was recruited to play for the Florida State University Seminoles in 2010 before transferring to Stony Brook University for the 2013 season. In two seasons as a Seawolf, Tye recorded 79 catches for 1,015 yards and nine touchdowns.

== Professional career ==
Pre-draft measurables
Height	Weight	Arm length	Hand span	40-yard dash	10-yard split	20-yard split	20-yard shuttle	Three-cone drill	Vertical jump	Broad jump
6 ft 2 1/8 in (1.88 m)	257 lb (117 kg)	33 in (0.84 m)	9 1/8 in (0.23 m)	4.57 s	1.60 s	2.65 s	4.65 s	7.21 s	31.5 in (0.80 m)	9 ft 4 in (2.84 m)
All values from Pro Day

=== New York Giants ===
After going undrafted in the 2015 NFL draft, Tye was signed by the New York Giants as an undrafted free agent. He competed with Larry Donnell, Adrien Robinson, Daniel Fells and Jerome Cunningham for the tight end job. On September 1, 2015, he was waived by the Giants. On September 7, 2015, he was signed to the Giants' practice squad. On October 3, 2015, the Giants promoted Tye to the active roster. Tye became the first player from Stony Brook to play in the NFL. On December 14 during a Monday Night Football game against the Miami Dolphins, Tye caught his first NFL touchdown from quarterback Eli Manning en route to a Giants victory. In the Giants next game against the Carolina Panthers on December 20, Tye found the endzone again in a Giants loss to the undefeated Panthers. In the season finale on January 3, 2016, Tye found the endzone again in a Giants loss to the Philadelphia Eagles.

For the 2015 season, Tye had 42 receptions for 464 yards and three touchdowns in 13 games played. Following the season, Tye was named to the 2015 PFWA All-Rookie Team.

Going into the 2016 season, Tye still had to prove his worth. He made the final 53-man roster and started the 2016 season on the Giants active roster. Tye's statistics regressed in 2016 as he recorded 48 receptions for 395 yards and only one touchdown.

On February 15, 2017, Tye re-signed with the Giants on a one-year deal. On September 2, 2017, the day of final roster cuts, Tye was released by the Giants.

=== New York Jets ===
Tye was claimed off waivers by the New York Jets on September 3, 2017. On September 10, Tye made his Jets debut, recording three receptions for 34 yards in the 21–12 loss to the Buffalo Bills. He was released on October 3, 2017.

=== New England Patriots ===
On October 12, 2017, Tye was signed to the New England Patriots' practice squad. He signed a reserve/future contract with the Patriots on February 6, 2018.

On September 1, Tye was waived with an injury designation as part of the roster cutdown, and reverted to the team's injured reserve the next day. He was released on September 6, 2018.

=== Philadelphia Eagles ===
On November 13, 2018, Tye was signed to the Eagles practice squad.

Tye signed a reserve/future contract with the Eagles on January 14, 2019. He was released during final roster cuts on August 30, 2019.

== Personal life ==
During his rookie season in 2015, Tye earned the nickname "Baby Gates" because of his admiration of San Diego Chargers tight end Antonio Gates and the fact that Tye and Gates have similar playing styles.
