= Larry Donnell =

American football player (born 1988)

No. 84
- Position: Tight end

Personal information
- Born: November 1, 1988 (age 38); Ozark, Alabama, U.S.
- Listed height: 6 ft 6 in (1.98 m)
- Listed weight: 265 lb (120 kg)

Career information
- High school: Carroll (Ozark)
- College: Grambling State (2007–2010)
- NFL draft: 2011: undrafted

Career history
- New York Giants (2012–2016); Baltimore Ravens (2017)*
- * Offseason or practice squad member only

Career NFL statistics
- Receptions: 110
- Receiving yards: 969
- Receiving touchdowns: 9
- Stats at Pro Football Reference

Larry Donnell (born November 1, 1988) is an American former professional football player who was a tight end for the New York Giants of the National Football League (NFL). He played college football for the Grambling State Tigers and was signed by the Giants as an undrafted free agent in 2012.

== Early life ==
Donnell attended Carroll High School in Ozark, Alabama, where he played football, basketball, and baseball.

== College career ==
Donnell played football for four seasons at Grambling State University. He switched from quarterback to tight end during his freshman year. He finished his college career with 38 receptions for 432 yards and 11 touchdowns.

After his senior season at Grambling State, Donnell was not invited to the NFL Scouting Combine.

== Professional career ==
Pre-draft measurables
Height	Weight	40-yard dash	10-yard split	20-yard split	20-yard shuttle	Three-cone drill	Vertical jump	Broad jump
6 ft 6 in (1.98 m)	268 lb (122 kg)	4.91 s	1.78 s	2.82 s	4.59 s	7.41 s	34.5 in (0.88 m)	9 ft 8 in (2.95 m)
All values from Grambling State Pro Day

=== New York Giants ===
Donnell, who was not drafted during the 2011 NFL draft, sat out the 2011 season. He signed with the Giants as an undrafted free agent on March 13, 2012. He was waived by the Giants on August 31, and re-signed to the Giants' practice squad on September 1.

Donnell was signed to a reserve/future contract by the Giants on September 2, 2013. He played on special teams for the entire regular season and started one game as a tight end. He finished the season with 3 receptions for 31 yards.

On September 25, 2014, in a nationally televised game on Thursday Night Football, Donnell scored 3 touchdowns on 7 receptions for 54 yards. Donnell was the first Giant tight end to accomplish the feat of scoring three touchdowns in the same game since Joe Walton in 1962. Donnell ironically lost Fantasy football that week when he benched himself for Vernon Davis, who suffered a back injury after only eight yards in two receptions against the Philadelphia Eagles three days later.

On March 4, 2015, the Giants tendered Donnell, which yielded him the three-year veteran minimum salary of $585,000 over one-year. The next day, Donnell was aboard Delta Air Lines Flight 1086 when it crashed upon landing. Donnell was not among the injured or hospitalized passengers, and posted pictures and video he took of the incident to his Instagram account.

On October 11, 2015, Donnell caught a 12-yard game-winning touchdown pass from Eli Manning in a week 5 game against the San Francisco 49ers. On December 8, Donnell was placed on season-ending injured reserve due to a neck injury he suffered after trying to do a somersault over a defender on November 1 in a game against the New Orleans Saints. Prior to being placed on injured reserve, Donnell had missed the previous four games. Donnell became a restricted free-agent after the 2015 season. On March 3, 2016, the Giants tendered Donnell with the original-round tender of $1.671 million. On April 19, Donnell signed his one-year restricted free-agent tender after getting clearance from team doctors. On February 13, 2017, Mike Garafolo of NFL.com reported that Donnell would not be re-signed.

=== Baltimore Ravens ===
On July 30, 2017, Donnell signed with the Baltimore Ravens. On September 1, he was released by the Ravens during final roster cuts.
