= 2013 Seattle Seahawks season =

American football team season

- Owner: Paul Allen
- General manager: John Schneider
- Head coach: Pete Carroll
- Offensive coordinator: Darrell Bevell
- Defensive coordinator: Dan Quinn
- Home stadium: CenturyLink Field

Results
- Record: 13–3
- Division place: 1st NFC West
- Playoffs: Won Divisional Playoffs (vs. Saints) 23–15; Won NFC Championship (vs. 49ers) 23–17; Won Super Bowl XLVIII (vs. Broncos) 43–8
- All-Pros: 3: CB Richard Sherman (1st team); S Earl Thomas (1st team); S Kam Chancellor (2nd team)
- Pro Bowlers: 6: QB Russell Wilson; RB Marshawn Lynch; C Max Unger; CB Richard Sherman; FS Earl Thomas; SS Kam Chancellor

Uniform
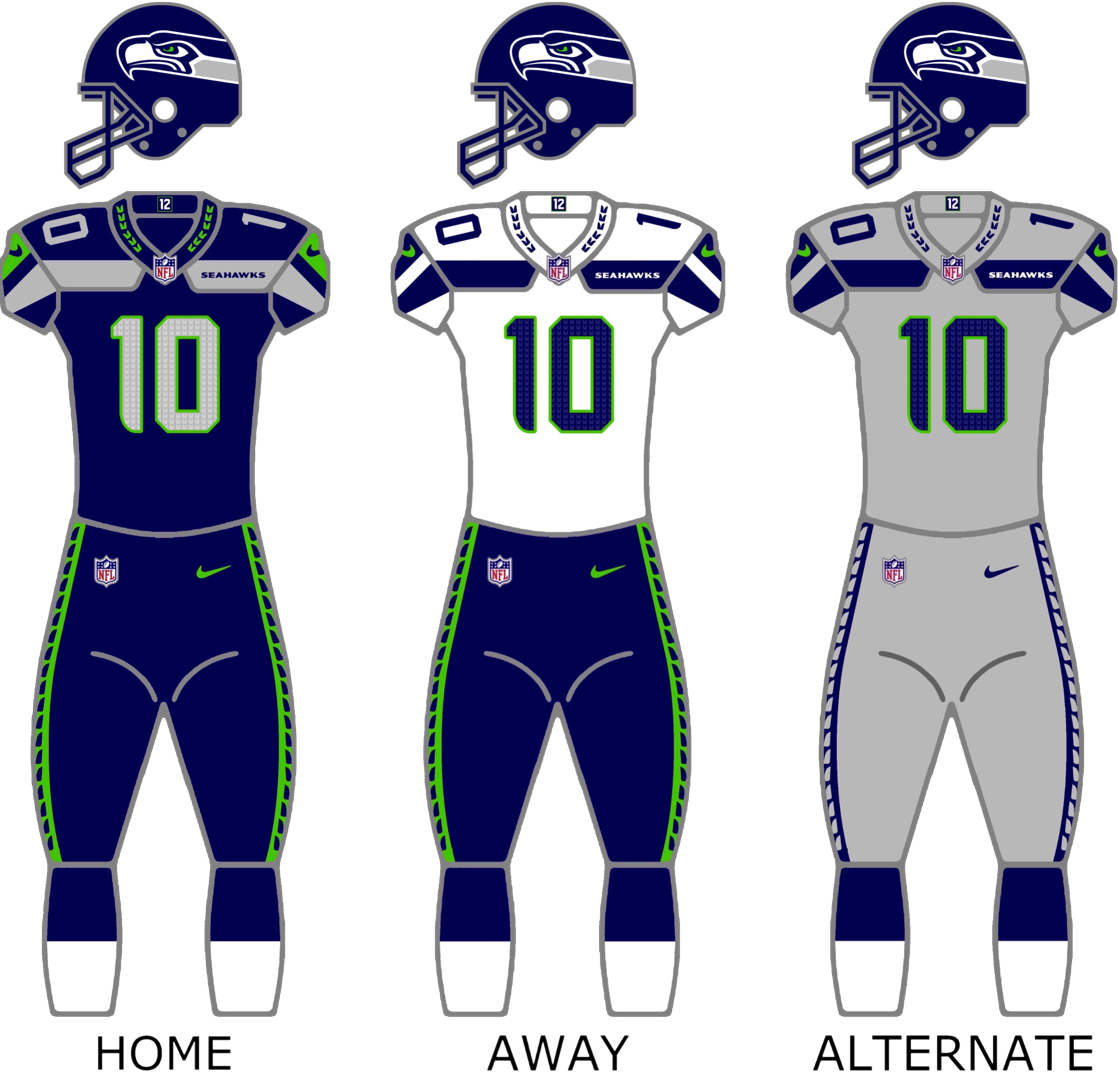

The 2013 season was the Seattle Seahawks' 38th in the National Football League (NFL) and their fourth under head coach Pete Carroll. With the Seahawks tenth win in the eleventh week of the season, the team secured double-digit victories in consecutive seasons for the first time in franchise history. Their 13–3 regular season record is tied with the 2005 season for the second best in franchise history. Seattle's defense in 2013 is regarded by many to be one of the best in NFL history.

The Seahawks clinched the NFC's No. 1 seed and homefield advantage throughout the playoffs with their 13–3 record. The Seahawks defeated the New Orleans Saints 23–15 in the Divisional round and the San Francisco 49ers 23–17 in the NFC Championship. In Super Bowl XLVIII, they defeated the Denver Broncos 43–8 for their first Super Bowl victory in franchise history. Eight of Seattle's wins were by double digits. The Seahawks allowed just 14.4 points per game in the regular season, which is a team record. The defense led the league in points allowed (231), yards allowed (4,378), and takeaways (39), the first team to lead all three categories since the 1985 Chicago Bears. The Seahawks outscored their opponents by 186 points, which was a team record until the Super Bowl LX-winning 2025 team came around, outscoring their opponents by 191.

The 2013 Seahawks rank #18 on the 100 greatest teams of all time presented by the NFL on its 100th anniversary.

== 2013 draft class ==
Round	Selection	Player	Position	College
2	62^{[b]}	Christine Michael	RB	Texas A&M
3	87	Jordan Hill	DT	Penn State
4	123	Chris Harper	WR	Kansas State
5	137^{[b]}	Jesse Williams	DT	Alabama
5	138^{[c]}	Tharold Simon	CB	LSU
5	158	Luke Willson	TE	Rice
6^{[b]}	194	Spencer Ware	RB	LSU
7^{[a]}	220^{[d]}	Ryan Seymour	G	Vanderbilt
7^{[a]}	231	Ty Powell	LB	Harding
7^{[a]}	241^{[e]}	Jared Smith	DT	New Hampshire
7^{[a]}	242^{[e]}	Michael Bowie	OT	Northeastern State

Notes

^{^[a]} The Seahawks traded their first-round selection (No. 25 overall), one of their seventh-round selections (No. 214 overall; previously acquired in a trade that sent quarterback Tarvaris Jackson to the Buffalo Bills) and a conditional 2014 selection to the Minnesota Vikings in exchange for wide receiver Percy Harvin.
^{^[b]} The Seahawks traded their second-round selection (No. 56 overall) to the Baltimore Ravens in exchange for the Ravens' second-, fifth- and sixth- round selections — Nos. 62, 165 and 199 overall. The latter two selections were traded to the Detroit Lions in exchange for the Lions' fifth-round selection (No. 137 overall).
^{^[c]} The Seahawks acquired this fifth-round selection as part of a trade that sent linebacker Aaron Curry to the Oakland Raiders.
^{^[d]} The Seahawks acquired this seventh-round selection in a trade that sent linebacker Barrett Ruud to the New Orleans Saints.
^{^[e]} Compensatory selection.

== Staff ==
2013 Seattle Seahawks staff
Front office: Chairman – Paul Allen; President – Peter McLoughlin; Executive Vice President/General Manager – John Schneider; Senior Personnel Executive – Scot McCloughan; Senior Vice President of Football Administration – Matt Thomas; Director of Pro Personnel – Trent Kirchner; Director of College Scouting – Scott Fitterer; Assistant Director of Pro Personnel – Dan Morgan; Head coaches: Executive vice president of football operations/head coach – Pete Carroll; Assistant head coach/offensive line – Tom Cable; Offensive coaches: Offensive coordinator – Darrell Bevell; Quarterbacks – Carl Smith; Running backs – Sherman Smith; Wide receivers – Kippy Brown; Tight ends – Pat McPherson; Assistant offensive line – Pat Ruel; Offensive assistant – Nate Carroll; Offensive quality control/assistant quarterbacks – Dave Canales; Offensive quality control – Keith Carter	Defensive coaches: Defensive coordinator – Dan Quinn; Pass game coordinator – Rocky Seto; Defensive line – Travis Jones; Linebackers – Ken Norton, Jr.; Defensive backs – Kris Richard; Defensive assistant – Marquand Manuel; Defensive quality control – Robert Saleh; Special teams coaches: Special teams coordinator – Brian Schneider; Assistant special teams – Nick Sorensen; Strength and conditioning: Head strength and conditioning – Chris Carlisle; Assistant strength and conditioning – Mondray Gee; Assistant strength and conditioning – Jamie Yancher

== Final roster ==
2013 Seattle Seahawks roster
**Quarterbacks (QB)**: 7 Tarvaris Jackson; 3 Russell Wilson; **Running backs (RB)**: 40 Derrick Coleman FB; 24 Marshawn Lynch; 33 Christine Michael; 26 Michael Robinson; 22 Robert Turbin; **Wide receivers (WR)**: 89 Doug Baldwin; 11 Percy Harvin; 15 Jermaine Kearse; 83 Ricardo Lockette; 19 Bryan Walters; 81 Golden Tate; **Tight ends (TE)**: 87 Kellen Davis; 86 Zach Miller; 82 Luke Willson	**Offensive linemen (OL)**: 78 Alvin Bailey G; 73 Michael Bowie T/G; 77 James Carpenter G; 68 Breno Giacomini T; 74 Caylin Hauptmann T; 61 Lemuel Jeanpierre C; 67 Paul McQuistan T/G; 76 Russell Okung T; 64 J. R. Sweezy G; 60 Max Unger C; **Defensive linemen (DL)**: 56 Cliff Avril DE; 72 Michael Bennett DE; 79 Red Bryant DE; 91 Chris Clemons DE; 97 Jordan Hill DT; 95 Benson Mayowa DE; 99 Tony McDaniel DT; 69 Clinton McDonald DT; 92 Brandon Mebane DT	**Linebackers (LB)**: 55 Heath Farwell MLB; 51 Bruce Irvin OLB; 57 Mike Morgan OLB; 93 O'Brien Schofield OLB; 53 Malcolm Smith OLB; 54 Bobby Wagner MLB; 50 K. J. Wright OLB; **Defensive backs (DB)**: 31 Kam Chancellor SS; 20 Jeremy Lane CB; 42 Chris Maragos FS; 41 Byron Maxwell CB; 35 DeShawn Shead SS; 25 Richard Sherman CB; 29 Earl Thomas FS; 28 Walter Thurmond CB; **Special teams (ST)**: 49 Clint Gresham LS; 4 Stephen Hauschka K; 9 Jon Ryan P	**Practice squad**: 36 Akeem Auguste CB; 16 Phil Bates WR; 70 Mic'hael Brooks DT; 66 Dewayne Cherrington DT; 14 Arceto Clark WR; 5 B. J. Daniels QB; 48 Cooper Helfet TE; 94 D'Anthony Smith DT; 66 Jared Smith G (IR); **Reserve**: 93 Kenneth Boatright DE (IR); 39 Brandon Browner CB (Susp.); 38 Chandler Fenner CB (IR); 32 Jeron Johnson SS (IR); 85 Anthony McCoy TE (IR); 18 Sidney Rice WR (IR); 98 Greg Scruggs DE (PUP); 34 Tharold Simon CB (PUP); 59 Korey Toomer MLB (NF-Inj.); 44 Spencer Ware FB (IR); 90 Jesse Williams DT (IR); Rookies in italics 53 active, 12 reserve, 8 practice squad

- Starters in bold.

== Schedule ==
=== Preseason ===
Week	Date	Opponent	Result	Record	Venue	Attendance	Recap
1	August 8	at San Diego Chargers	**W** 31–10	1–0	Qualcomm Stadium	54,709	Recap
2	August 17	Denver Broncos	**W** 40–10	2–0	CenturyLink Field	67,635	Recap
3	August 23	at Green Bay Packers	**W** 17–10	3–0	Lambeau Field	74,030	Recap
4	August 29	Oakland Raiders	**W** 22–6	4–0	CenturyLink Field	67,341	Recap

=== Regular season ===
Divisional matchups: the NFC West played the NFC South and the AFC South.

Week	Date	Opponent	Result	Record	Venue	Attendance	Recap
1	September 8	at Carolina Panthers	**W** 12–7	1–0	Bank of America Stadium	73,294	Recap
2	September 15	**San Francisco 49ers**	**W** 29–3	2–0	CenturyLink Field	68,338	Recap
3	September 22	Jacksonville Jaguars	**W** 45–17	3–0	CenturyLink Field	68,087	Recap
4	September 29	at Houston Texans	**W** 23–20 (OT)	4–0	Reliant Stadium	71,756	Recap
5	October 6	at Indianapolis Colts	**L** 28–34	4–1	Lucas Oil Stadium	66,608	Recap
6	October 13	Tennessee Titans	**W** 20–13	5–1	CenturyLink Field	68,127	Recap
7	October 17	at **Arizona Cardinals**	**W** 34–22	6–1	University of Phoenix Stadium	61,200	Recap
8	October 28	at **St. Louis Rams**	**W** 14–9	7–1	Edward Jones Dome	55,966	Recap
9	November 3	Tampa Bay Buccaneers	**W** 27–24 (OT)	8–1	CenturyLink Field	67,873	Recap
10	November 10	at Atlanta Falcons	**W** 33–10	9–1	Georgia Dome	70,309	Recap
11	November 17	Minnesota Vikings	**W** 41–20	10–1	CenturyLink Field	68,235	Recap
12	Bye						
13	December 2	New Orleans Saints	**W** 34–7	11–1	CenturyLink Field	68,387	Recap
14	December 8	at **San Francisco 49ers**	**L** 17–19	11–2	Candlestick Park	69,732	Recap
15	December 15	at New York Giants	**W** 23–0	12–2	MetLife Stadium	79,691	Recap
16	December 22	**Arizona Cardinals**	**L** 10–17	12–3	CenturyLink Field	68,266	Recap
17	December 29	**St. Louis Rams**	**W** 27–9	13–3	CenturyLink Field	68,264	Recap

Bold indicates division opponents.

== Standings ==
=== Division ===
NFC West
	W	L	T	PCT	DIV	CONF	PF	PA	STK
^{(1)} Seattle Seahawks	13	3	0	.813	4–2	10–2	417	231	W1
^{(5)} San Francisco 49ers	12	4	0	.750	5–1	9–3	406	272	W6
Arizona Cardinals	10	6	0	.625	2–4	6–6	379	324	L1
St. Louis Rams	7	9	0	.438	1–5	4–8	348	364	L1

=== Conference ===
NFC
#	Team	Division	W	L	T	PCT	DIV	CONF	SOS	SOV	STK
Division winners
1	Seattle Seahawks	West	13	3	0	.813	4–2	10–2	.490	.445	W1
2	Carolina Panthers	South	12	4	0	.750	5–1	9–3	.494	.451	W3
3	Philadelphia Eagles	East	10	6	0	.625	4–2	9–3	.453	.391	W2
4	Green Bay Packers	North	8	7	1	.531	3–2–1	6–5–1	.453	.371	W1
Wild cards
5	San Francisco 49ers	West	12	4	0	.750	5–1	9–3	.494	.414	W6
6	New Orleans Saints	South	11	5	0	.688	5–1	9–3	.516	.455	W1
Did not qualify for the postseason
7	Arizona Cardinals	West	10	6	0	.625	2–4	6–6	.531	.444	L1
8 (Note: Chicago defeated Dallas head-to-head (Week 14, 45–28).)	Chicago Bears	North	8	8	0	.500	2–4	4–8	.465	.469	L2
9	Dallas Cowboys	East	8	8	0	.500	5–1	7–5	.484	.363	L1
10 (Note: The NY Giants and Detroit finished with a better conference record than St. Louis.) (Note: The NY Giants defeated Detroit head-to-head (Week 16, 23–20 (OT)).)	New York Giants	East	7	9	0	.438	3–3	6–6	.520	.366	W2
11 (Note: Detroit finished with a better conference record than St. Louis.)	Detroit Lions	North	7	9	0	.438	4–2	6–6	.457	.402	L4
12	St. Louis Rams	West	7	9	0	.438	1–5	4–8	.551	.446	L1
13	Minnesota Vikings	North	5	10	1	.344	2–3–1	4–7–1	.512	.450	W1
14 (Note: Atlanta finished with a better conference record than Tampa Bay.)	Atlanta Falcons	South	4	12	0	.250	1–5	3–9	.553	.313	L2
15	Tampa Bay Buccaneers	South	4	12	0	.250	1–5	2–10	.574	.391	L3
16	Washington Redskins	East	3	13	0	.188	0–6	1–11	.516	.438	L8
Tiebreakers (Note: When breaking ties for three or more teams under the NFL's rules, they are first broken within divisions, then comparing only the highest-ranked remaining team from each division.)

== Game summaries ==
=== Preseason ===
==== Week P1: at San Diego Chargers ====
Preseason Week One: Seattle Seahawks at San Diego Chargers – Game summary

Quarter	1	2	3	4	Total
Seahawks	0	7	10	14	31
Chargers	3	0	0	7	10

at Qualcomm Stadium, San Diego, California

- Date: August 8
- Game time: 7:00pm local
- Game weather: clear, 68 °F (20 °C), 71% humidity, wind WNW 7 miles per hour (11 km/h)
- Game attendance: 54,709
- Referee: Ed Hochuli
- TV: KCPQ
- Gamecenter, Gamebook

==== Week P2: vs. Denver Broncos ====
Preseason Week Two: Seattle Seahawks vs. Denver Broncos – Game summary

Quarter	1	2	3	4	Total
Broncos	7	0	0	3	10
Seahawks	17	16	7	0	40

at CenturyLink Field, Seattle

- Date: August 17
- Game time: 7:06pm local
- Game weather: clear, 76 °F (24 °C), 51% humidity, wind SSW 7 miles per hour (11 km/h)
- Game attendance: 67,635
- Referee: Ron Torbert
- TV: KCPQ
- Gamecenter, Gamebook

==== Week P3: at Green Bay Packers ====
Preseason Week Three: Seattle Seahawks at Green Bay Packers – Game summary

Quarter	1	2	3	4	Total
Seahawks	3	0	7	7	17
Packers	3	0	7	0	10

at Lambeau Field, Green Bay, Wisconsin

- Date: August 23
- Game time: 7:06pm local
- Game weather: clear, 73 °F (23 °C), 57% humidity, wind SE 8 miles per hour (13 km/h)
- Game attendance: 74,030
- Referee: Ron Winter
- TV: CBS
- Gamecenter, Gamebook

==== Week P4: vs. Oakland Raiders ====
Preseason Week Four: Seattle Seahawks vs. Oakland Raiders – Game summary

Quarter	1	2	3	4	Total
Raiders	3	3	0	0	6
Seahawks	10	6	3	3	22

at CenturyLink Field, Seattle

- Date: August 29
- Game time: 7:05pm local
- Game weather: rain, 66 °F (19 °C), 88% humidity, wind S 7 miles per hour (11 km/h)
- Game attendance: 67,341
- Referee: Carl Cheffers
- TV: KCPQ
- Gamecenter, Gamebook

=== Regular season ===
==== Week 1: at Carolina Panthers ====
Week One: Seattle Seahawks at Carolina Panthers – Game summary

Quarter	1	2	3	4	Total
Seahawks	0	3	3	6	12
Panthers	0	7	0	0	7

at Bank of America Stadium, Charlotte, North Carolina

- Date: September 8
- Game time: 1:04 p.m. local
- Game weather: partly cloudy, 87 °F (31 °C), 48% humidity, wind N 7 miles per hour (11 km/h)
- Game attendance: 73,294
- Referee: Jeff Triplette
- TV announcers (Fox): Chris Myers, Tim Ryan & Jennifer Hale
- Gamecenter, Gamebook

Game information

First quarter

- No scoring plays

Second quarter

- SEA – Stephen Hauschka 27-yard field goal, 9:36, Seahawks 3–0. Drive: 15 plays, 74 yards, 8:47.
- CAR – Steve Smith 3-yard pass from Cam Newton (Graham Gano kick), 3:13. Panthers 7–3. Drive: 11 plays, 80 yards, 6:23.

Third quarter

- SEA – Stephen Hauschka 40-yard field goal, 2:22. Panthers 7–6. Drive: 9 plays, 43 yards, 4:14.

Fourth quarter

- SEA – Jermaine Kearse 43-yard pass from Russell Wilson (pass failed), 10:13. Seahawks 12–7. Drive: 6 plays, 74 yards, 2:45.

Top passers

- SEA – Russell Wilson: 25/33, 320 yds, 1 TD
- CAR – Cam Newton: 16/23, 125 yds, 1 TD

Top rushers

- SEA – Marshawn Lynch: 17 car, 43 yds
- CAR – DeAngelo Williams: 17 car, 86 yds

Top receivers

- SEA – Doug Baldwin: 7 rec, 91 yds
- CAR – Greg Olsen: 5 rec, 56 yds

Top tacklers

- SEA – Earl Thomas: 8 solo, 2 asst, ff
- CAR – Charles Godfrey: 7 solo, 2 asst, sack

Team – pass – rush – total – to

- SEA – 300 – 70 – 370 – 1
- CAR – 119 – 134 – 253 – 2

The Seattle Seahawks kicked off their 2013 campaign with a hard-fought, ugly win over the Carolina Panthers, 12–7. This game marked Russell Wilson's first 300-yard passing game, and Cam Newton's worst career performance, posting 125 yards through the air, a career low.

The first quarter was scoreless, with both sides exchanging a couple of punts. On their third possession of the game, in the second quarter, Seattle drove into the red zone, capping it with a Stephen Hauschka 27-yard field goal. Carolina responded immediately, taking advantage of a couple of Seattle penalties and some big runs by DeAngelo Williams. Cam Newton hit Steve Smith for a 3-yard TD. Seattle responded with a drive to around the Carolina 27 yard line, but Charles Godfrey sacked Russell Wilson and stripped the football, which Carolina recovered. So the first half ended 7–3, in favor of Carolina.

The second half began with a defensive battle. Hauschka made a 40-yard field goal, after a drive that lasted over 4 minutes, cutting the lead to 7–6. After forcing Carolina to punt midway through the fourth quarter, Seattle's offense produced its finest drive of the day. A couple of Russell Wilson passes, followed by a Robert Turbin 15-yard scamper, set up Seattle at the Panthers' 43 yard line. Russell Wilson overthrew receiver Stephen Williams on first down, but on second down and 10, using exactly the same play, Wilson connected with second-year man Jermaine Kearse for a 43-yard score, with 10 minutes left to play. They failed on the two-point conversion however, so Seattle clung to a 12–7 lead. DeAngelo Williams made some big runs. Inside the Seattle 35 yard line, Williams took off for 24 yards and looked like he was going to score, but Earl Thomas caused him to fumble inside the 10 yard line.

==== Week 2: vs. San Francisco 49ers ====
Week Two: San Francisco 49ers at Seattle Seahawks – Game summary

Quarter	1	2	3	4	Total
49ers	0	0	3	0	3
Seahawks	0	5	7	17	29

at CenturyLink Field, Seattle

- Date: September 15
- Game time: 5:31 p.m. local
- Game weather: cloudy, 64 °F (18 °C), 81% humidity, wind SSW 6 miles per hour (9.7 km/h)
- Game attendance: 68,338
- Referee: John Parry
- TV announcers (NBC): Al Michaels, Cris Collinsworth & Michele Tafoya
- Gamecenter, Gamebook

Game information

First quarter

- No scoring plays

Second quarter

- SEA – Safety, Bruce Miller holding in end zone, 10:39. Seahawks 2–0.
- SEA – Stephen Hauschka 30-yard field goal, 5:52. Seahawks 5–0. Drive: 6 plays, 17 yards, 2:15.

Third quarter

- SEA – Marshawn Lynch 14-yard run (Stephen Hauschka kick), 9:12. Seahawks 12–0. Drive: 10 plays, 80 yards, 5:48.
- SF – Phil Dawson 21-yard field goal, 4:20. Seahawks 12–3. Drive: 9 plays, 71 yards, 4:52.

Fourth quarter

- SEA – Marshawn Lynch 7-yard pass from Russell Wilson (Stephen Hauschka kick), 13:44. Seahawks 19–3. Drive: 10 plays, 80 yards, 5:36.
- SEA – Stephen Hauschka 37-yard field goal, 11:31. Seahawks 22–3. Drive: 4 plays, 6 yards, 1:36.
- SEA – Marshawn Lynch 2-yard run (Stephen Hauschka kick), 4:22. Seahawks 29–3. Drive: 1 play, 2 yards, 0:04.

Top passers

- SF – Colin Kaepernick: 13/28, 127 yds, 3 INT
- SEA – Russell Wilson: 8/19, 142 yds, 1 TD, 1 INT

Top rushers

- SF – Colin Kaepernick: 9 car, 87 yds
- SEA – Marshawn Lynch: 28 car, 98 yds, 2 TD

Top receivers

- SF – Kyle Williams: 4 rec, 39 yds
- SEA – Doug Baldwin: 1 rec, 51 yds

Top tacklers

- SF – NaVorro Bowman: 4 solo, 7 asst
- SEA – Bobby Wagner: 2 solo, 5 asst, pd

Team – pass – rush – total – to

- SF – 107 – 100 – 207 – 5
- SEA – 118 – 172 – 290 – 1

In week 2, the Seahawks took on their division rivals, the San Francisco 49ers. Prior to the season, NFL analysts rated this rivalry as the top upcoming rivalry, as well as the top rivalry of the decade. Both teams proved that point, when they had an arms race in the off-season, Seattle picking up Percy Harvin and San Francisco picking Anquan Boldin in the off-season, among others. Last season, the teams were 1–1 against each other, Seattle being the better team, as they blew out the Niners 42–13 in the last meeting in Seattle, coincidentally, also on Sunday Night Football. It was also a day that Russell Wilson and Colin Kaepernick appeared to bet an eyebrow, with the loser shaving his eyebrow; this was later revealed to be a publicity stunt. Finally, it was a day where former Seahawk Shaun Alexander would raise the 12th man flag.

The game began quietly though, as both sides failed to establish a rhythm. The game was delayed midway through the first quarter due to lightning in the vicinity of the stadium, the second such case in the 2013 season (Ravens-Broncos kickoff game in week 1 was the first). After getting back onto the field, the 49ers blocked a Seahawks punt and got the ball in Seattle territory. However, Seattle claimed a whistle was heard from the crowd, which confused the linemen and the punter. That claim was later justified by NBC analyst Cris Collinsworth. The Niners took advantage and drove to the Seattle 10-yard line. However, on third down, Earl Thomas intercepted a Colin Kaepernick pass, and Seattle regained possession. A few plays later, Russell Wilson was intercepted by rookie Eric Reid, and the tug of war continued into the second quarter.

All was quiet until midway through the second quarter, where fullback Bruce Miller was caught holding in the endzone, the result of which was a safety, and a Seattle 2–0 lead. Later on, defensive end Cliff Avril strip sacked Kaepernick and K. J. Wright recovered for Seattle, the result of which was a Stephen Hauschka 30-yard field goal. Halftime came with a small 5–0 Seahawks lead. The game was pretty dark and messy at that point, the only bright side being Seattle running back Marshawn Lynch.

In the third quarter, the Seahawks came out roaring. On third and 12, Wilson connected with receiver Doug Baldwin for a 51-yard gain to inside the 49ers 25 yard line. A few plays later, Lynch took it to the house on a 14-yard run, 12–0 Seattle. The 49ers responded with a drive to the Seattle 6-yard line, capped off by Phil Dawson 21-yard field goal, that included a 28-yard scramble by Kaepernick, 12–3 Seahawks. However, that would be it for the Niners, and the third quarter.

In the fourth quarter, the Seahawks demolished the Niners on all phases of play. It started with Wilson hitting Lynch for a 7-yard score on third down. A few plays into the Niners next drive, Kaepernick was intercepted by Richard Sherman, who took it to the 49ers 25-yard line. That resulted in a 37-yard Hauschka field goal. On the ensuing Niners drive, Kaepernick was intercepted again, this time by safety Kam Chancellor, who had signed a contract extension earlier in the year. Lynch scored on a 2-yard run on the next play. Seattle led 29–3. The 49ers fumbled the ensuing kickoff, and Seattle recovered.

Seattle won, in convincing style, silencing any critics. The 12th man also broke a Guinness world record, for the loudest outdoor stadium. Yet again, Seattle dominated on SNF, and Pete Carroll improved to 3–4 overall against the Niners, and 2–3 against bitter rival Jim Harbaugh. Seattle was now 2–0, and still unbeaten at home.

==== Week 3: vs. Jacksonville Jaguars ====
Week Three: Jacksonville Jaguars at Seattle Seahawks – Game summary

Quarter	1	2	3	4	Total
Jaguars	0	0	10	7	17
Seahawks	7	17	14	7	45

at CenturyLink Field, Seattle

- Date: September 22
- Game time: 1:26 p.m. local
- Game weather: rain, 61 °F (16 °C), 87% humidity, wind S 17 miles per hour (27 km/h)
- Game attendance: 68,087
- Referee: Bill Vinovich
- TV announcers (CBS): Bill Macatee & Steve Tasker
- Gamecenter, Gamebook

Game information

First quarter

- SEA – Zach Miller 1-yard pass from Russell Wilson (Stephen Hauschka kick), 8:04. Seahawks 7–0. Drive: 7 plays, 71 yards, 3:27.

Second quarter

- SEA – Zach Miller 4-yard pass from Russell Wilson (Stephen Hauschka kick), 14:26. Seahawks 14–0. Drive: 6 plays, 40 yards, 2:56.
- SEA – Stephen Hauschka 21-yard field goal, 9:40. Seahawks 17–0. Drive: 5 plays, 44 yards, 2:43.
- SEA – Sidney Rice 11-yard pass from Russell Wilson (Stephen Hauschka kick), 0:10. Seahawks 24–0. Drive: 5 plays, 79 yards, 0:33.

Third quarter

- SEA – Sidney Rice 23-yard pass from Russell Wilson (Stephen Hauschka kick), 11:41. Seahawks 31–0. Drive: 3 plays, 33 yards, 1:26.
- JAX – Maurice Jones-Drew 2-yard run (Josh Scobee kick), 6:20. Seahawks 31–7. Drive: 2 plays, 2 yards, 0:11.
- SEA – Doug Baldwin 35-yard pass from Tarvaris Jackson (Stephen Hauschka kick), 1:28. Seahawks 38–7. Drive: 5 plays, 58 yards, 2:26.
- JAX – Josh Scobee 33-yard field goal, 0:06. Seahawks 38–10. Drive: 5 plays, 65 yards, 1:22.

Fourth quarter

- JAX – Jordan Todman 3-yard run (Josh Scobee kick), 9:06. Seahawks 38–17. Drive: 9 plays, 52 yards, 3:09.
- SEA – Tarvaris Jackson 5-yard run (Stephen Hauschka kick), 6:32. Seahawks 45–17. Drive: 5 plays, 80 yards, 2:34.

Top passers

- JAX – Chad Henne: 18/38, 235 yds, 2 INT
- SEA – Russell Wilson: 14/21, 202 yds, 4 TD, 1 INT

Top rushers

- JAX – Maurice Jones-Drew: 19 car, 43 yds, 1 TD
- SEA – Marshawn Lynch: 17 car, 69 yds

Top receivers

- JAX – Cecil Shorts III: 8 rec, 143 yds
- SEA – Golden Tate: 5 rec, 88 yds

Top tacklers

- JAX – Paul Posluszny: 5 solo, 7 asst, tfl, INT, pd
- SEA – Bobby Wagner: 3 solo, 6 asst, tfl, INT, pd

Team – pass – rush – total – to

- JAX – 214 – 51 – 265 – 3
- SEA – 323 – 156 – 479 – 2

The Seahawks entered week 3 on top of the NFC to take on the Jacksonville Jaguars who were on the opposite end of the AFC. This game did not garner much attention, considering the fact that it was a "best vs worst" game. However, that didn't change Seattle's positive "1–0" mentality to the game.

Seattle opened up the game with a punt. After forcing a Jacksonville three and out, on a drive which included a Clinton McDonald sack, Russell Wilson marched the Seahawks right down the field, on a drive that included a 27-yard run by Marshawn Lynch, and on third and goal from the 1-yard line, hit tight end Zach Miller for a touchdown, and an early 7–0 lead.

Picking up from where they left off in the first quarter, Seattle took their first drive of the second quarter, where Wilson connected with Miller for a 4-yard touchdown pass, the duo's second of the day. After a Stephen Hauschka 21-yard field goal on the next drive, the game got quiet until the Jaguars final drive of the half, where Chad Henne was intercepted by linebacker Bobby Wagner, with under a minute left to play. Wilson then made some beautiful completions to receivers Golden Tate and Sidney Rice in lightning fast succession, the latter of whom caught an 11-yard pass for a touchdown with 10 seconds left on the clock, to send Seattle up 24–0 at the half.

On the Seahawks first drive of the second half, they picked up were they left off, as Wilson hit rice for a 23-yard score, marking Wilson's fourth TD pass of the day, tying a career-high, and putting the Hawks up 31–0. On the ensuing drive, however, Wilson was picked off by linebacker Paul Posluszny, who returned it to the Seattle 2-yard line, where Jaguars RB Maurice Jones-Drew punched it in on the next play, 31–7 Seattle. That was the last time Wilson touched the ball. Backup Tarvaris Jackson took over and drove Seattle to the Jaguars 35-yard line, not missing a single completion on the drive. He then threw a TD pass to Doug Baldwin, adding to the lead, 38–7 Seattle.

Seattle then shut its system off, which allowed Henne to hit receiver Cecil Shorts III for a couple of long completions on the Jaguars next couple of drives, racking up 10 points, including a fourth-quarter run by Jordan Todman, his first career TD, 38–17 Seattle. Jackson led the Seahawks downfield, scoring on a 5-yard scramble, re-establishing a big lead, 45–17.

Seattle started 3–0 for the first time since 2006, and the first time in the Pete Carroll era. Seattle is still unbeaten at home, with a 10–0 record including last year.

==== Week 4: at Houston Texans ====
Week Four: Seattle Seahawks at Houston Texans – Game summary

Quarter	1	2	3	4	OT	Total
Seahawks	3	0	3	14	3	23
Texans	0	20	0	0	0	20

at Reliant Stadium, Houston, Texas

- Date: September 29
- Game time: 12:03 p.m. local
- Game weather: indoors
- Game attendance: 71,756
- Referee: Tony Corrente
- TV announcers (Fox): Chris Myers, Tim Ryan & Jennifer Hale
- https://www.nfl.com/games/seahawks-at-texans-2013-reg-4 Gamecenter], Gamebook

Game information

First quarter

- SEA – Stephen Hauschka 48-yard field goal, 11:11. Seahawks 3–0. Drive: 4 plays, 40 yards, 1:34.

Second quarter

- HOU – Garrett Graham 31-yard pass from Matt Schaub (Randy Bullock kick), 14:55. Texans 7–3. Drive: 6 plays, 90 yards, 2:52.
- HOU – Arian Foster 5-yard pass from Matt Schaub (Randy Bullock kick), 6:11. Texans 14–3. Drive: 10 plays, 80 yards, 5:10.
- HOU – Randy Bullock 22-yard field goal, 3:51. Texans 17–3. Drive: 7 plays, 15 yards, 2:13.
- HOU – Randy Bullock 42-yard field goal, 0:01. Texans 20–3. Drive: 12 plays, 67 yards, 1:12.

Third quarter

- SEA – Stephen Hauschka 39-yard field goal, 3:54. Texans 20–6. Drive: 4 plays, 0 yards, 0:25.

Fourth quarter

- SEA – Marshawn Lynch 3-yard run (Stephen Hauschka kick), 7:43. Texans 20–13. Drive: 14 plays, 98 yards, 7:28.
- SEA – Richard Sherman 58-yard interception return (Stephen Hauschka kick), 2:40. Tied 20–20.

Overtime

- SEA – Stephen Hauschka 45-yard field goal, 3:19. Seahawks 23–20. Drive: 8 plays, 42 yards, 3:27.

Top passers

- SEA – Russell Wilson: 12/23, 123 yds, 1 INT
- HOU – Matt Schaub: 31/49, 355 yds, 2 TD, 2 INT

Top rushers

- SEA – Marshawn Lynch: 17 car, 98 yds, 1 TD
- HOU – Arian Foster: 27 car, 102 yds

Top receivers

- SEA – Marshawn Lynch: 3 rec, 45 yds
- HOU – Andre Johnson: 9 rec, 110 yds

Top tacklers

- SEA – Bobby Wagner: 6 solo, 2 asst, fr
- HOU – Brian Cushing: 6 solo, 3 asst, ff

Team – pass – rush – total – to

- SEA – 91 – 179 – 270 – 2
- HOU – 325 – 151 – 476 – 3

The Seahawks led 3–0 after the first quarter, but the Texans scored 20 unanswered points in the second quarter, building a 20–3 halftime lead. However, the Seahawks outscored the Texans 17–0 in the third and fourth quarters. With less than three minutes to go, and the Texans leading 20–13, Matt Schaub's pass on 3rd down was picked off by Richard Sherman and returned 58 yards for a pick six, allowing the Seahawks to tie the game and force overtime. The Seahawks would go on to win the game in overtime by a final score of 23–20. With the win, the Seahawks would open the season with a 4–0 record for the first time in franchise history.

==== Week 5: at Indianapolis Colts ====
Week Five: Seattle Seahawks at Indianapolis Colts – Game summary

Quarter	1	2	3	4	Total
Seahawks	12	7	9	0	28
Colts	7	10	6	11	34

at Lucas Oil Stadium, Indianapolis

- Date: October 6
- Game time: 1:03 p.m. local
- Game weather: indoors
- Game attendance: 66,608
- Referee: Ron Winter
- TV announcers (Fox): Kevin Burkhardt, John Lynch & Erin Andrews
- Gamecenter, Gamebook

Game information

First quarter

- SEA – Stephen Hauschka 42-yard field goal, 11:40. Seahawks 3–0. Drive: 5 plays, 28 yards, 2:13.
- SEA – Golden Tate 10-yard pass from Russell Wilson (Stephen Hauschka kick), 6:14. Seahawks 10–0. Drive: 8 plays, 64 yards, 4:14.
- SEA – Safety, Pat McAfee punt blocked by Jermaine Kearse out of the back of the end zone, 4:53. Seahawks 12–0.
- IND – T. Y. Hilton 73-yard pass from Andrew Luck (Adam Vinatieri kick), 1:04. Seahawks 12–7. Drive: 4 plays, 84 yards, 1:41.

Second quarter

- IND – Delano Howell 61-yard blocked field goal return (Adam Vinatieri kick), 13:06. Colts 14–12.
- SEA – Jermaine Kearse 28-yard pass from Russell Wilson (Stephen Hauschka kick), 5:57. Seahawks 19–14. Drive: 7 plays, 82 yards, 7:09.
- IND – Adam Vinatieri 41-yard field goal, 0:58. Seahawks 19–17. Drive: 11 plays, 58 yards, 4:59.

Third quarter

- SEA – Stephen Hauschka 36-yard field goal, 11:18. Seahawks 22–17. Drive: 9 plays, 62 yards, 3:42.
- SEA – Stephen Hauschka 41-yard field goal, 8:12. Seahawks 25–17. Drive: 4 plays, 7 yards, 1:30.
- IND – T. Y. Hilton 29-yard pass from Andrew Luck (pass failed), 4:16. Seahawks 25–23. Drive: 10 plays, 80 yards, 3:56.
- SEA – Stephen Hauschka 46-yard field goal, 0:35. Seahawks 28–23. Drive: 9 plays, 52 yards, 3:41.

Fourth quarter

- IND – Donald Brown 3-yard run (Reggie Wayne pass from Andrew Luck), 8:55. Colts 31–28. Drive: 14 plays, 86 yards, 6:40.
- IND – Adam Vinatieri 49-yard field goal, 1:55. Colts 34–28. Drive: 9 plays, 42 yards, 4:43.

Top passers

- SEA – Russell Wilson: 15/31, 210 yds, 2 TD, 1 INT
- IND – Andrew Luck: 16/29, 229 yds, 2 TD

Top rushers

- SEA – Russell Wilson: 13 car, 102 yds
- SEA – Marshawn Lynch: 17 car, 102 yds
- IND – Trent Richardson: 18 car, 56 yds

Top receivers

- SEA – Doug Baldwin: 5 rec, 80 yds
- IND – T. Y. Hilton: 5 rec, 140 yds, 2 TD

Top tacklers

- SEA – Earl Thomas: 9 solo
- SEA – K. J. Wright: 3 solo, 6 asst
- IND – Jerrell Freeman: 7 solo, 6 asst, tfl

Team – pass – rush – total – to

- SEA – 205 – 218 – 423 – 2
- IND – 208 – 109 – 317 – 2

This would be the first meeting between quarterbacks Russell Wilson and Andrew Luck, who were both selected in the 2012 NFL draft. Though Wilson and the Seahawks maintained a lead throughout the first three quarters, Luck led the Colts back, taking the lead and never letting go in the 4th. It would be the first loss for the Seahawks in the season, dropping their record to 4–1. The Colts punted and the Seahawks drove down the field and scored a field goal to go up 3–0. After another Indy three-and-out, Russell Wilson threw a 10-yard touchdown pass to Golden Tate to take a 10–0 lead. Then another Indy punt was blocked and bounced out of the endzone to extend the lead to 12–0. Seattle punted to Indy when Andrew Luck threw a 73-yard touchdown to T.Y. Hilton to make the score 12–7. Seattle drove into field goal range but a 48-yard field goal was blocked and returned for a touchdown by the Colts. Indy led 14–12 until Wilson found Jermaine Kearse to give Seattle a 19–14 lead. Luck led the Colts downfield and they kicked a field goal to make it 19–17 at the half. Seattle kicked another field goal to make it 22–17. Indianapolis fumbled and led to a 25–17 Seahawks lead. Luck then found Hilton in the endzone but the two-point-conversion failed leaving the score at 25–23. Seattle then kicked a 4th field goal to extend their lead to 28–23. Indy scored a touchdown to make it 31–28 and then a field goal to make it 34–28 final.

==== Week 6: vs. Tennessee Titans ====
Week Six: Tennessee Titans at Seattle Seahawks – Game summary

Quarter	1	2	3	4	Total
Titans	3	7	0	3	13
Seahawks	0	7	3	10	20

at CenturyLink Field, Seattle

- Date: October 13
- Game time: 1:06 p.m. local
- Game weather: clear, 51 °F (11 °C), 80% humidity, wind N 4 miles per hour (6.4 km/h)
- Game attendance: 68,127
- Referee: Carl Cheffers
- TV announcers (CBS): Greg Gumbel & Dan Dierdorf
- Gamecenter, Gamebook

Game information

First quarter

- TEN – Rob Bironas 38-yard field goal, 5:16. Titans 3–0. Drive: 9 plays, 72 yards, 4:43.

Second quarter

- SEA – Marshawn Lynch 1-yard run (Stephen Hauschka kick), 2:41. Seahawks 7–3. Drive: 12 plays, 74 yards, 6:42.
- TEN – Jason McCourty 77-yard defensive fumble return (Rob Bironas kick), 0:00. Titans 10–7.

Third quarter

- SEA – Stephen Hauschka 31-yard field goal, 4:27. Tied 10–10. Drive: 12 plays, 75 yards, 6:26.

Fourth quarter

- SEA – Stephen Hauschka 29-yard field goal, 11:23. Seahawks 13–10. Drive: 7 plays, 69 yards, 3:37.
- SEA – Marshawn Lynch 3-yard run (Stephen Hauschka kick), 7:33. Seahawks 20–10. Drive: 7 plays, 59 yards, 3:42.
- TEN – Rob Bironas 25-yard field goal, 2:18. Seahawks 20–13. Drive: 14 plays, 69 yards, 5:15.

Top passers

- TEN – Ryan Fitzpatrick: 17/29, 171 yds, 2 INT
- SEA – Russell Wilson: 23/31, 257 yds

Top rushers

- TEN – Chris Johnson: 12 car, 33 yds
- TEN – Ryan Fitzpatrick: 6 car, 33 yds
- SEA – Marshawn Lynch: 21 car, 77 yds, 2 TD

Top receivers

- TEN – Kendall Wright: 5 rec, 69 yds
- SEA – Marshawn Lynch: 4 rec, 78 yds

Top tacklers

- TEN – Jason McCourty: 7 solo, 2 asst, tfl, fr, TD
- TEN – Bernard Pollard: 6 solo, 3 asst, sack
- SEA – K. J. Wright: 3 solo, 4 asst, pd

Team – pass – rush – total – to

- TEN – 157 – 66 – 223 – 2
- SEA – 253 – 151 – 404 – 2

Following their loss to the Colts, the Seahawks returned to CenturyLink field to host the Tennessee Titans. The Seahawks allowed a field goal from Titans kicker Rob Bironas, but a second quarter touchdown from running back Marshawn Lynch caused the Seahawks to retake the lead. The Seahawks attempted to extend their lead at the end of the quarter with a field goal. With their kicker Stephen Hauschka in the locker room with a potential injury, usual holder Jon Ryan filled in the kicker position, and reserve safety Chris Maragos was asked to hold the ball for the field goal attempt. Maragos however fumbled the snap, which was recovered by Titans special teamer Jason McCourty and run back 77 yards for a touchdown. The Seahawks then entered halftime behind 7–10.

During the 3rd quarter, the Seahawks held the Titans scoreless while scoring a field goal of their own, tying the game. An additional field goal during the 4th put the Seahawks ahead again. On the first play of the next drive, Fitzpatrick threw an interception to Seahawks cornerback Richard Sherman. The Seahawks capitalized by with another touchdown from Lynch. The Seahawks would only allow another field goal from the Titans, and the win brought their record to 5–1.

==== Week 7: at Arizona Cardinals ====
Week Seven: Seattle Seahawks at Arizona Cardinals – Game summary

Quarter	1	2	3	4	Total
Seahawks	7	10	14	3	34
Cardinals	0	10	3	9	22

at University of Phoenix Stadium, Glendale, Arizona

- Date: October 17
- Game time: 5:25 p.m. local
- Game weather: clear, 82 °F (28 °C), 13% humidity, wind S 7 miles per hour (11 km/h)
- Game attendance: 61,200
- Referee: Terry McAulay
- TV announcers (NFL Network): Brad Nessler, Mike Mayock & Alex Flanagan
- Gamecenter, Gamebook

Game information

First quarter

- SEA – Sidney Rice 31-yard pass from Russell Wilson (Stephen Hauschka kick), 7:13. Seahawks 7–0. Drive: 5 plays, 83 yards, 2:31.

Second quarter

- SEA – Zach Miller 15-yard pass from Russell Wilson (Stephen Hauschka kick), 13:25. Seahawks 14–0. Drive: 11 plays, 72 yards, 5:26.
- ARI – Jay Feely 49-yard field goal, 4:02. Seahawks 14–3. Drive: 11 plays, 26 yards, 6:10.
- ARI – Rashard Mendenhall 3-yard run (Jay Feely kick), 3:40. Seahawks 14–10. Drive: 1 play, 3 yards, 0:03.
- SEA – Stephen Hauschka 51-yard field goal, 0:05. Seahawks 17–10. Drive: 12 plays, 47 yards, 3:35.

Third quarter

- ARI – Jay Feely 52-yard field goal, 11:48. Seahawks 17–13. Drive: 5 plays, 17 yards, 1:09.
- SEA – Kellen Davis 1-yard pass from Russell Wilson (Stephen Hauschka kick), 7:48. Seahawks 24–13. Drive: 10 plays, 80 yards, 4:00.
- SEA – Marshawn Lynch 2-yard run (Stephen Hauschka kick), 3:52. Seahawks 31–13. Drive: 2 plays, 1 yard, 0:51.

Fourth quarter

- ARI – Jay Feely 22-yard field goal, 14:41. Seahawks 31–16. Drive: 6 plays, 11 yards, 0:39.
- SEA – Stephen Hauschka 42-yard field goal, 10:21. Seahawks 34–16. Drive: 8 plays, 56 yards, 4:20.
- ARI – Jaron Brown 8-yard pass from Carson Palmer (pass failed), 4:34. Seahawks 34–22. Drive: 8 plays, 71 yards, 3:28.

Top passers

- SEA – Russell Wilson: 18/29, 235 yds, 3 TD
- ARI – Carson Palmer: 30/45, 258 yds, 1 TD, 2 INT

Top rushers

- SEA – Marshawn Lynch: 21 car, 91 yds, 1 TD
- ARI – Rashard Mendenhall: 13 car, 22 yds, 1 TD

Top receivers

- SEA – Golden Tate: 4 rec, 77 yds
- ARI – Michael Floyd: 5 rec, 71 yds

Top tacklers

- SEA – Malcolm Smith: 6 solo, 2 asst, sack, 2 tfl, pd
- ARI – Calais Campbell: 7 solo, 1 asst, tfl, fr

Team – pass – rush – total – to

- SEA – 209 – 135 – 344 – 2
- ARI – 204 – 30 – 234 – 2

Playing on Thursday Night Football, the Seahawks easily defeated their division rival behind quarterback Russell Wilson's 235 passing yards, running back Marshawn Lynch's 91 running yards, and two interceptions from secondary members Brandon Browner and Earl Thomas.

==== Week 8: at St. Louis Rams ====
Week Eight: Seattle Seahawks at St. Louis Rams – Game summary

Quarter	1	2	3	4	Total
Seahawks	0	7	7	0	14
Rams	3	0	3	3	9

at Edward Jones Dome, St. Louis, Missouri

- Date: October 28
- Game time: 7:30 p.m. local
- Game weather: indoors
- Game attendance: 55,966
- Referee: Gene Steratore
- TV announcers (ESPN): Mike Tirico, Jon Gruden & Lisa Salters
- Gamecenter, Gamebook

Game information

First quarter

- STL – Greg Zuerlein 33-yard field goal, 4:37. Rams 3–0. Drive: 7 plays, 31 yards, 3:27.

Second quarter

- SEA – Golden Tate 2-yard pass from Russell Wilson (Stephen Hauschka kick), 5:37. Seahawks 7–3. Drive: 6 plays, 26 yards, 2:41.

Third quarter

- STL – Greg Zuerlein 28-yard field goal, 4:01. Seahawks 7–6. Drive: 10 plays, 37 yards, 5:51.
- SEA – Golden Tate 80-yard pass from Russell Wilson (Stephen Hauschka kick), 3:45. Seahawks 14–6. Drive: 2 plays, 80 yards, 0:16.

Fourth quarter

- STL – Greg Zuerlein 27-yard field goal, 12:51. Seahawks 14–9. Drive: 11 plays, 69 yards, 5:54.

Top passers

- SEA – Russell Wilson: 10/18, 139 yds, 2 TD
- STL – Kellen Clemens: 15/31, 158 yds, 2 INT

Top rushers

- SEA – Marshawn Lynch: 8 car, 23 yds
- STL – Zac Stacy: 26 car, 134 yds

Top receivers

- SEA – Golden Tate: 5 rec, 93 yds, 2 TD
- STL – Chris Givens: 4 rec, 59 yds

Top tacklers

- SEA – Earl Thomas: 10 solo, pd
- STL – Robert Quinn: 5 solo, 3 sacks, 4 tfl

Team – pass – rush – total – to

- SEA – 91 – 44 – 135 – 0
- STL – 139 – 200 – 339 – 2

The Seahawks defeated the Rams 14–9 in a Monday Night Football thriller. The Rams were successful at limiting the Seahawks offense, holding running back Marshawn Lynch to a season low of only 23 yards and sacking quarterback Russell Wilson seven times. After holding the Rams to a field goal in the first quarter, the Seahawks went ahead with a 2-yard touchdown pass to Golden Tate.

The Rams responded in the third quarter with another field goal, cutting down the Seahawks' lead to 1. After an incomplete pass to Jermaine Kearse on the first play of the next drive, Wilson threw an 80-yard touchdown to Golden Tate. It was the longest play of either player's career. On his way towards the end zone, Tate turned and sarcastically waved towards Rams safety Rodney McLeod. Though the touchdown would count, the Seahawks would be penalized for taunting during the kickoff. Carroll chastised Tate after the penalty occurred, and Tate was fined $7,875 after the game.

After the Seahawks allowed an additional Rams field goal, the game came down to the final drive. The Rams, in possession of the ball with 5:42 left in the game, managed to drive the ball all the way to the 6 yard line with less than 1:20 left on the clock. A missed throw from Rams quarterback Kellen Clemens and a 4-yard run from Rams running back Daryl Richardson allowed the Rams a 3rd and Goal at the 2-yard line, but a defensive offsides call on Seahawks defensive end Chris Clemons cut the distance in half. The Seahawks stopped an additional run from Richardson, and Rams head coach Jeff Fisher called a timeout with only 4 seconds left in the game. Seahawks cornerback Brandon Browner successfully defended Clemens's final pass towards Brian Quick, sealing the Seahawks victory and bringing their record to 7–1.

==== Week 9: vs. Tampa Bay Buccaneers ====
Week Nine: Tampa Bay Buccaneers at Seattle Seahawks – Game summary

Quarter	1	2	3	4	OT	Total
Buccaneers	0	21	3	0	0	24
Seahawks	0	7	7	10	3	27

at CenturyLink Field, Seattle

- Date: November 3
- Game time: 1:05 p.m. local
- Game weather: clear, 48 °F (9 °C), 68% humidity, wind SSE 4 miles per hour (6.4 km/h)
- Game attendance: 67,873
- Referee: Mike Carey
- TV announcers (Fox): Kenny Albert, Daryl Johnston & Tony Siragusa
- Gamecenter, Gamebook

Game information

First quarter

- No scoring plays

Second quarter

- TB – Tim Wright 12-yard pass from Mike Glennon (Rian Lindell kick), 11:50. Buccaneers 7–0. Drive: 10 plays, 90 yards, 6:03.
- TB – Tiquan Underwood 20-yard pass from Mike Glennon (Rian Lindell kick), 2:55. Buccaneers 14–0. Drive: 11 plays, 84 yards, 6:42.
- TB – Tom Crabtree 2-yard pass from Mike James (Rian Lindell kick), 2:16. Buccaneers 21–0. Drive: 2 plays, 31 yards, 0:30.
- SEA – Jermaine Kearse 16-yard pass from Russell Wilson (Stephen Hauschka kick), 1:40. Buccaneers 21–7. Drive: 3 plays, 80 yards, 0:36.

Third quarter

- TB – Rian Lindell 33-yard field goal, 9:48. Buccaneers 24–7. Drive: 11 plays, 65 yards, 5:12.
- SEA – Russell Wilson 10-yard run (Stephen Hauschka kick), 5:00. Buccaneers 24–14. Drive: 9 plays, 86 yards, 4:48.

Fourth quarter

- SEA – Stephen Hauschka 36-yard field goal, 14:47. Buccaneers 24–17. Drive: 4 plays, 7 yards, 1:11.
- SEA – Doug Baldwin 10-yard pass from Russell Wilson (Stephen Hauschka kick), 1:51. Tied 24–24. Drive: 10 plays, 59 yards, 4:22.

Overtime

- SEA – Stephen Hauschka 27-yard field goal, 8:11. Seahawks 27–24. Drive: 9 plays, 51 yards, 4:53.

Top passers

- TB – Mike Glennon: 17/23, 168 yds, 2 TD
- SEA – Russell Wilson: 19/26, 217 yds, 2 TD, 2 INT

Top rushers

- TB – Mike James: 28 car, 158 yds
- SEA – Marshawn Lynch: 21 car, 125 yds

Top receivers

- TB – Tim Wright: 4 rec, 58 yds, 1 TD
- SEA – Doug Baldwin: 6 rec, 75 yds, 1 TD

Top tacklers

- TB – Mark Barron: 10 solo, 1 asst, 2 pd, INT
- TB – Lavonte David: 5 solo, 6 asst
- SEA – Earl Thomas: 8 solo, 4 asst

Team – pass – rush – total – to

- TB – 145 – 205 – 350 – 0
- SEA – 217 – 198 – 415 – 3

The top-ranked Seahawks hosted the winless Tampa Bay Buccaneers in what many believed would be a blowout. However, the Buccaneers marched to a 21–0 lead during the 2nd quarter, which included a trick play from running back Mike James. Despite giving up a field goal later in the game, the Seahawks came roaring back, tying the game during the fourth quarter and forcing overtime. The Seahawks narrowly avoided a loss with a 27-yard field goal from Stephen Hauschka.

==== Week 10: at Atlanta Falcons ====
Week Ten: Seattle Seahawks at Atlanta Falcons – Game summary

Quarter	1	2	3	4	Total
Seahawks	3	20	3	7	33
Falcons	0	3	7	0	10

at Georgia Dome, Atlanta

- Date: November 10
- Game time: 1:03 p.m. local
- Game weather: indoors
- Game attendance: 70,309
- Referee: Bill Vinovich
- TV announcers (Fox): Kevin Burkhardt, John Lynch & Erin Andrews
- Gamecenter, Gamebook

Game information

First quarter

- SEA – Stephen Hauschka 39-yard field goal, 7:32. Seahawks 3–0. Drive: 11 plays, 48 yards, 5:58.

Second quarter

- SEA – Stephen Hauschka 43-yard field goal, 11:53. Seahawks 6–0. Drive: 7 plays, 34 yards, 2:56.
- ATL – Matt Bryant 53-yard field goal, 6:30. Seahawks 6–3. Drive: 10 plays, 45 yards, 5:23.
- SEA – Jermaine Kearse 43-yard pass from Russell Wilson (Stephen Hauschka kick), 5:33. Seahawks 13–3. Drive: 2 plays, 80 yards, 0:57.
- SEA – Stephen Hauschka 44-yard field goal, 1:52. Seahawks 16–3. Drive: 5 plays, 49 yards, 2:01.
- SEA – Golden Tate 6-yard pass from Russell Wilson (Stephen Hauschka kick), 0:01. Seahawks 23–3. Drive: 7 plays, 60 yards, 1:02.

Third quarter

- SEA – Stephen Hauschka 53-yard field goal, 7:49. Seahawks 26–3. Drive: 12 plays, 45 yards, 7:11.
- ATL – Darius Johnson 12-yard pass from Matt Ryan (Matt Bryant kick), 1:02. Seahawks 26–10. Drive: 13 plays, 82 yards, 6:47.

Fourth quarter

- SEA – Marshawn Lynch 1-yard run (Stephen Hauschka kick), 8:48. Seahawks 33–10. Drive: 12 plays, 80 yards, 7:14.

Top passers

- SEA – Russell Wilson: 19/26, 287 yds, 2 TD
- ATL – Matt Ryan: 23/36, 172 yds, 1 TD

Top rushers

- SEA – Marshawn Lynch: 24 car, 145 yds, 1 TD
- ATL – Jacquizz Rodgers: 3 car, 31 yds

Top receivers

- SEA – Golden Tate: 6 rec, 106 yds, 1 TD
- ATL – Harry Douglas: 7 rec, 49 yds

Top tacklers

- SEA – Bobby Wagner: 9 solo
- ATL – Paul Worrilow: 10 solo, 9 asst, tfl

Team – pass – rush – total – to

- SEA – 279 – 211 – 490 – 0
- ATL – 162 – 64 – 226 – 1

This was a rematch of the NFC Divisional matchup from the 2012 postseason. The Seahawks jumped out to a 23–3 halftime lead and never looked back, routing the Falcons 33–10. The Seahawks won their fifth consecutive game as their record improved to 9–1.

==== Week 11: vs. Minnesota Vikings ====
Week Eleven: Minnesota Vikings at Seattle Seahawks – Game summary

Quarter	1	2	3	4	Total
Vikings	3	10	0	7	20
Seahawks	10	14	0	17	41

at CenturyLink Field, Seattle

- Date: November 17
- Game time: 1:26 p.m. local
- Game weather: clear, 50 °F (10 °C), 81% humidity, wind S 14 miles per hour (23 km/h)
- Game attendance: 68,235
- Referee: Jerome Boger
- TV announcers (Fox): Chris Myers, Tim Ryan & Jennifer Hale
- Gamecenter, Gamebook

Game information

First quarter

- SEA – Stephen Hauschka 50-yard field goal, 11:25. Seahawks 3–0. Drive: 5 plays, 1 yard, 2:04.
- MIN – Blair Walsh 32-yard field goal, 4:40. Tied 3–3. Drive: 13 plays, 66 yards, 6:45.
- SEA – Marshawn Lynch 4-yard run (Stephen Hauschka kick), 0:00. Seahawks 10–3. Drive: 4 plays, 78 yards, 2:10.

Second quarter

- MIN – Jarius Wright 38-yard pass from Christian Ponder (Blair Walsh kick), 11:28. Tied 10–10. Drive: 6 plays, 80 yards, 3:32.
- SEA – Marshawn Lynch 1-yard run (Stephen Hauschka kick), 6:26. Seahawks 17–10. Drive: 9 plays, 79 yards, 5:02.
- MIN – Blair Walsh 45-yard field goal, 0:48. Seahawks 17–13. Drive: 11 plays, 48 yards, 5:48.
- SEA – Doug Baldwin 19-yard pass from Russell Wilson (Stephen Hauschka kick), 0:10. Seahawks 24–13. Drive: 5 plays, 46 yards, 0:38.

Third quarter

- No scoring plays.

Fourth quarter

- SEA – Marshawn Lynch 6-yard pass from Russell Wilson (Stephen Hauschka kick), 13:14. Seahawks 31–13. Drive: 2 plays, 18 yards, 0:38.
- SEA – Walter Thurmond 29-yard interception return (Stephen Hauschka kick), 12:30. Seahawks 38–13.
- SEA – Stephen Hauschka 26-yard field goal, 10:12. Seahawks 41–13. Drive: 4 plays, 7 yards, 1:28.
- MIN – Jarius Wright 21-yard pass from Matt Cassel (Blair Walsh kick), 2:18. Seahawks 41–20. Drive: 7 plays, 60 yards, 2:53.

Top passers

- MIN – Christian Ponder: 13/22, 129 yds, 1 TD, 2 INT
- SEA – Russell Wilson: 13/18, 230 yds, 2 TD

Top rushers

- MIN – Toby Gerhart: 7 car, 67 yds
- SEA – Marshawn Lynch: 17 car, 54 yds, 2 TD

Top receivers

- MIN – Jarius Wright: 3 rec, 69 yds, 2 TD
- MIN – John Carlson: 5 rec, 69 yds
- SEA – Zach Miller: 4 rec, 69 yds

Top tacklers

- MIN – Andrew Sendejo: 5 solo, 5 asst, tfl
- SEA – Bobby Wagner: 6 solo, 3 asst, sack, 2 pd, INT
- SEA – K. J. Wright: 4 solo, 5 asst, tfl

Team – pass – rush – total – to

- MIN – 204 – 132 – 336 – 4
- SEA – 230 – 93 – 323 – 0

At the beginning of this game, Doug Baldwin flew the Philippines flag in memory of the victims of Typhoon Yolanda. Free agent signee Percy Harvin saw his first minutes of playing time of the season during the game, incidentally against the team that drafted him. He would catch one pass for 17 yards and return one kickoff for 58 yards. The Seahawks entered the bye week with a 10–1 record, the best in the NFL at the time.

==== Week 13: vs. New Orleans Saints ====
Week Thirteen: New Orleans Saints at Seattle Seahawks – Game summary

Quarter	1	2	3	4	Total
Saints	0	7	0	0	7
Seahawks	17	10	7	0	34

at CenturyLink Field, Seattle

- Date: December 2
- Game time: 5:41 p.m. local
- Game weather: cloudy, 41 °F (5 °C), 62% humidity, wind S 6 miles per hour (9.7 km/h)
- Game attendance: 68,387
- Referee: Ed Hochuli
- TV announcers (ESPN): Mike Tirico, Jon Gruden & Lisa Salters
- Gamecenter, Gamebook

Game information

First quarter

- SEA – Stephen Hauschka 26-yard field goal, 7:47. Seahawks 3–0. Drive: 11 plays, 61 yards, 5:44.
- SEA – Michael Bennett 22-yard fumble return (Stephen Hauschka kick), 6:27. Seahawks 10–0.
- SEA – Zach Miller 2-yard pass from Russell Wilson (Stephen Hauschka kick), 1:55. Seahawks 17–0. Drive: 6 plays, 73 yards, 2:58.

Second quarter

- NO – Jimmy Graham 2-yard pass from Drew Brees (Garrett Hartley kick), 8:45. Seahawks 17–7. Drive: 13 plays, 80 yards, 8:10.
- SEA – Stephen Hauschka 20-yard field goal, 3:41. Seahawks 20–7. Drive: 10 plays, 82 yards, 5:04.
- SEA – Doug Baldwin 4-yard pass from Russell Wilson (Stephen Hauschka kick), 0:13. Seahawks 27–7. Drive: 12 plays, 88 yards, 1:52.

Third quarter

- SEA – Derrick Coleman 8-yard pass from Russell Wilson (Stephen Hauschka kick), 7:07. Seahawks 34–7. Drive: 8 plays, 79 yards, 3:47.

Fourth quarter

- No scoring plays.

Top passers

- NO – Drew Brees: 23/38, 147 yds, 1 TD
- SEA – Russell Wilson: 22/30, 310 yds, 3 TD

Top rushers

- NO – Mark Ingram II: 8 car, 22 yds
- SEA – Russell Wilson: 8 car, 47 yds

Top receivers

- NO – Jimmy Graham: 3 rec, 42 yds, 1 TD
- SEA – Zach Miller: 5 rec, 86 yds, 1 TD

Top tacklers

- NO – Curtis Lofton: 6 solo, 6 asst, 2 tfl
- SEA – Bobby Wagner: 4 solo, 7 asst, pd

Team – pass – rush – total – to

- NO – 144 – 44 – 188 – 1
- SEA – 302 – 127 – 429 – 0

The Seahawks dominated from start to finish, routing the Saints 34–7. The Seahawks won their 7th consecutive game as their record improved to 11–1. They became the first team to clinch a berth for the 2013 postseason.

==== Week 14: at San Francisco 49ers ====
Week Fourteen: Seattle Seahawks at San Francisco 49ers – Game summary

Quarter	1	2	3	4	Total
Seahawks	0	14	0	3	17
49ers	6	10	0	3	19

at Candlestick Park, San Francisco

- Date: December 8
- Game time: 1:26 p.m. local
- Game weather: clear, 43 °F (6 °C), 49% humidity, wind E 5 miles per hour (8.0 km/h)
- Game attendance: 69,732
- Referee: Clete Blakeman
- TV announcers (Fox): Joe Buck, Troy Aikman, Pam Oliver & Erin Andrews
- Gamecenter, Gamebook

Game information

First quarter

- SF – Phil Dawson 23-yard field goal, 5:04. 49ers 3–0. Drive: 10 plays, 56 yards, 4:44.
- SF – Phil Dawson 48-yard field goal, 0:58. 49ers 6–0. Drive: 4 plays, 4 yards, 0:56.

Second quarter

- SEA – Marshawn Lynch 11-yard run (Stephen Hauschka kick), 12:17. Seahawks 7–6. Drive: 8 plays, 80 yards, 3:41.
- SF – Phil Dawson 52-yard field goal, 7:56. 49ers 9–7. Drive: 10 plays, 40 yards, 4:21.
- SEA – Luke Willson 39-yard pass from Russell Wilson (Stephen Hauschka kick), 3:47. Seahawks 14–9. Drive: 7 plays, 79 yards, 4:09.
- SF – Vernon Davis 8-yard pass from Colin Kaepernick (Phil Dawson kick), 0:06. 49ers 16–14. Drive: 9 plays, 72 yards, 3:41.

Third quarter

- No scoring plays.

Fourth quarter

- SEA – Stephen Hauschka 31-yard field goal, 6:20. Seahawks 17–16. Drive: 7 plays, 14 yards, 2:57.
- SF – Phil Dawson 22-yard field goal, 0:26. 49ers 19–17. Drive: 11 plays, 76 yards, 5:54.

Top passers

- SEA – Russell Wilson: 15/25, 199 yds, 1 TD, 1 INT
- SF – Colin Kaepernick: 15/29, 175 yds, 1 TD, 1 INT

Top rushers

- SEA – Marshawn Lynch: 20 car, 72 yds, 1 TD
- SF – Frank Gore: 17 car, 110 yds

Top receivers

- SEA – Luke Willson: 3 rec, 70 yds, 1 TD
- SF – Anquan Boldin: 6 rec, 93 yds

Top tacklers

- SEA – Bobby Wagner: 7 solo, 2 asst
- SF – NaVorro Bowman: 8 solo, asst, sack, ff

Team – pass – rush – total – to

- SEA – 178 – 86 – 264 – 1
- SF – 155 – 163 – 318 – 1

In week 14 the Seahawks traveled out of their stadium to San Francisco where they took a loss to the 49ers. Russell Wilson was intercepted to end the game and continued the Seahawks' losing streak in Candlestick Park in which they last won in 2008. It was their last appearance at Candlestick Park, as the 49ers moved to Levi's Stadium for the 2014 season.

With the loss, the Seahawks' record dropped into 11–2. This would be the last time they lost to the 49ers until 2018.

==== Week 15: at New York Giants ====
Week Fifteen: Seattle Seahawks at New York Giants – Game summary

Quarter	1	2	3	4	Total
Seahawks	3	10	3	7	23
Giants	0	0	0	0	0

at MetLife Stadium, East Rutherford, New Jersey

- Date: December 15
- Game time: 1:03 p.m. local
- Game weather: partly cloudy, 36 °F (2 °C), 88% humidity, wind WNW 7 miles per hour (11 km/h)
- Game attendance: 79,691
- Referee: Bill Leavy
- TV announcers (Fox): Kevin Burkhardt, John Lynch & Erin Andrews
- Gamecenter, Gamebook

Game information

First quarter

- SEA – Stephen Hauschka 49-yard field goal, 8:33. Seahawks 3–0. Drive: 5 plays, 11 yards, 2:00.

Second quarter

- SEA – Marshawn Lynch 2-yard run (Stephen Hauschka kick), 5:30. Seahawks 10–0. Drive: 7 plays, 62 yards, 3:33.
- SEA – Stephen Hauschka 44-yard field goal, 0:03. Seahawks 13–0. Drive: 10 plays, 40 yards, 2:45.

Third quarter

- SEA – Stephen Hauschka 24-yard field goal, 8:47. Seahawks 16–0. Drive: 9 plays, 39 yards, 4:03.

Fourth quarter

- SEA – Doug Baldwin 12-yard pass from Russell Wilson (Stephen Hauschka kick), 12:13. Seahawks 23–0. Drive: 6 plays, 16 yards, 2:40.

Top passers

- SEA – Russell Wilson: 18/27, 206 yds, TD, INT
- NYG – Eli Manning: 18/31, 156 yds, 5 INT

Top rushers

- SEA – Russell Wilson: 8 car, 50 yds
- NYG – Andre Brown: 11 car, 17 yds

Top receivers

- SEA – Marshawn Lynch: 6 rec, 73 yds
- NYG – Jerrel Jernigan: 7 rec, 67 yds

Top tacklers

- SEA – Bobby Wagner: 8 solo, 2 asst, 1.5 sacks, tfl
- NYG – Spencer Paysinger: 6 solo, 2 asst

Team – pass – rush – total – to

- SEA – 193 – 134 – 327 – 1
- NYG – 156 – 25 – 181 – 5

In what many pundits dubbed a "Super Bowl dress rehearsal", the Seahawks faced the New York Giants at MetLife Stadium, where the Super Bowl would be held at the end of the season. The Legion of Boom intercepted Giants quarterback Eli Manning five times and held the team scoreless throughout the entire game.

==== Week 16: vs. Arizona Cardinals ====
Week Sixteen: Arizona Cardinals at Seattle Seahawks – Game summary

Quarter	1	2	3	4	Total
Cardinals	0	3	3	11	17
Seahawks	0	3	0	7	10

at CenturyLink Field, Seattle

- Date: December 22
- Game time: 1:06 p.m. local
- Game weather: cloudy, 48 °F (9 °C), 94% humidity, wind SSE 6 miles per hour (9.7 km/h)
- Game attendance: 68,266
- Referee: Scott Green
- TV announcers (Fox): Chris Myers, Tim Ryan & Jennifer Hale
- Gamecenter, Gamebook

Game information

First quarter

- No scoring plays.

Second quarter

- SEA – Stephen Hauschka 27-yard field goal, 13:42. Seahawks 3–0. Drive: 13 plays, 70 yards, 6:02.
- ARI – Jay Feely 39-yard field goal, 2:15. Tied 3–3. Drive: 16 plays, 75 yards, 8:21.

Third quarter

- ARI – Jay Feely 46-yard field goal, 0:27. Cardinals 6–3. Drive: 6 plays, 27 yards, 3:03.

Fourth quarter

- ARI – Jay Feely 26-yard field goal, 10:39. Cardinals 9–3. Drive: 5 plays, 45 yards, 2:34.
- SEA – Zach Miller 11-yard pass from Russell Wilson (Stephen Hauschka kick), 7:26. Seahawks 10–9. Drive: 6 plays, 61 yards, 3:13.
- ARI – Michael Floyd 31-yard pass from Carson Palmer (Rashard Mendenhall run), 2:13. Cardinals 17–10. Drive: 10 plays, 80 yards, 5:13.

Top passers

- ARI – Carson Palmer: 13/25, 178 yds, 1 TD, 4 INT
- SEA – Russell Wilson: 11/27, 108 yds, 1 TD, 1 INT

Top rushers

- ARI – Andre Ellington: 15 car, 64 yds
- SEA – Marshawn Lynch: 18 car, 71 yds

Top receivers

- ARI – Brittan Golden: 1 rec, 63 yds
- SEA – Jermaine Kearse: 3 rec, 38 yds

Top tacklers

- ARI – Daryl Washington: 4 solo, 3 asst, sack, tfl
- SEA – Kam Chancellor: 6 solo, 5 asst, 2 pd, INT

Team – pass – rush – total – to

- ARI – 168 – 139 – 307 – 4
- SEA – 89 – 103 – 192 – 2

In Seattle's first loss at home since the 2011 season, the team record dropped to 12–3. Amazingly, this would also be Russell Wilson's first home loss in football since his college season with North Carolina State University.

==== Week 17: vs. St. Louis Rams ====
Week Seventeen: St. Louis Rams at Seattle Seahawks – Game summary

Quarter	1	2	3	4	Total
Rams	0	0	3	6	9
Seahawks	7	6	7	7	27

at CenturyLink Field, Seattle

- Date: December 29
- Game time: 1:26 p.m. local
- Game weather: cloudy, 40 °F (4 °C), 93% humidity, wind SSE 5 miles per hour (8.0 km/h)
- Game attendance: 68,264
- Referee: Jeff Triplette
- TV announcers (Fox): Chris Myers, Tim Ryan & Jennifer Hale
- Gamecenter, Gamebook

Game information

First quarter

- SEA – Malcolm Smith 37-yard interception return (Stephen Hauschka kick), 9:50. Seahawks 7–0.

Second quarter

- SEA – Stephen Hauschka 28-yard field goal, 6:14. Seahawks 10–0. Drive: 11 plays, 65 yards, 6:32.
- SEA – Stephen Hauschka 35-yard field goal, 0:03. Seahawks 13–0. Drive: 10 plays, 44 yards, 2:40.

Third quarter

- STL – Greg Zuerlein 36-yard field goal, 10:49. Seahawks 13–3. Drive: 5 plays, 13 yards, 1:28.
- SEA – Marshawn Lynch 2-yard run (Stephen Hauschka kick), 2:21. Seahawks 20–3. Drive: 14 plays, 80 yards, 8:28.

Fourth quarter

- SEA – Golden Tate 47-yard pass from Russell Wilson (Stephen Hauschka kick), 9:14. Seahawks 27–3. Drive: 4 plays, 61 yards, 2:10.
- STL – Jared Cook 2-yard pass from Kellen Clemens (pass failed), 4:13. Seahawks 27–9. Drive: 13 plays, 71 yards, 5:01.

Top passers

- STL – Kellen Clemens: 21/30, 157 yds, 1 TD, 2 INT
- SEA – Russell Wilson: 15/23, 172 yds, 1 TD

Top rushers

- STL – Zac Stacy: 15 car, 15 yds
- SEA – Marshawn Lynch: 23 car, 97 yds, 1 TD

Top receivers

- STL – Lance Kendricks: 5 rec, 54 yds
- SEA – Golden Tate: 8 rec, 129 yds, 1 TD

Top tacklers

- STL – James Laurinaitis: 6 solo. 4 asst
- SEA – Bobby Wagner: 7 solo, 5 asst

Team – pass – rush – total – to

- STL – 145 – 13 – 158 – 2
- SEA – 158 – 111 – 269 – 0

With the win, the Seahawks' record improved to 13–3 as they clinched the NFC West and home-field advantage throughout the NFC playoffs as the #1 seed.

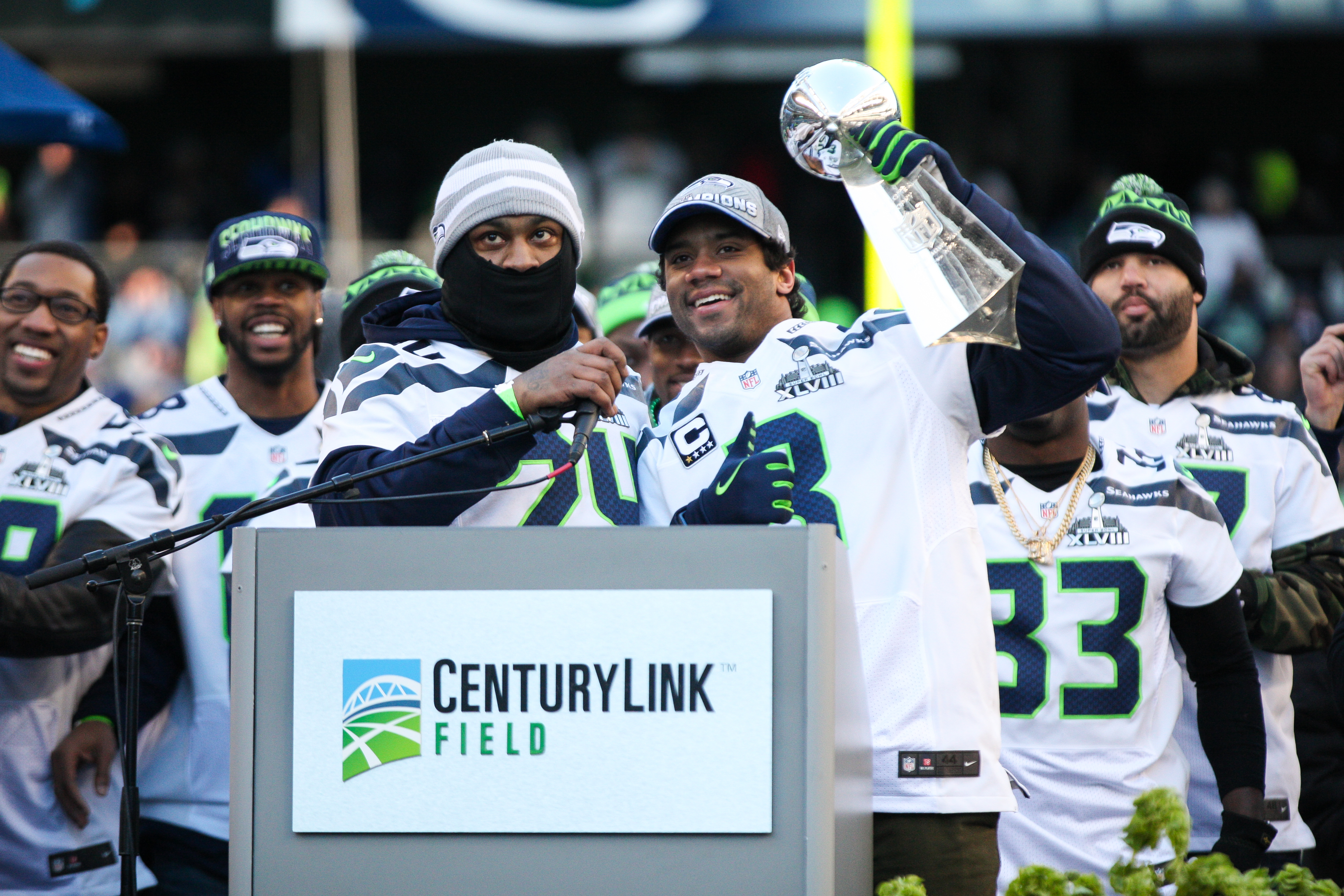
Marshawn Lynch (left front) and Russell Wilson (right front) with the Vince Lombardi Trophy at the CenturyLink Field in Seattle, February 5, 2014

=== Postseason ===
Round	Date	Opponent (seed)	Result	Record	Venue	Attendance	Recap
Wild Card	First-round bye						
Divisional	January 11, 2014	New Orleans Saints (6)	W 23–15	1–0	CenturyLink Field	68,388	Recap
NFC Championship	January 19, 2014	San Francisco 49ers (5)	W 23–17	2–0	CenturyLink Field	68,454	Recap
Super Bowl XLVIII	February 2, 2014	vs. Denver Broncos (A1)	W 43–8	3–0	MetLife Stadium	82,529	Recap

Seattle entered the postseason as the #1 seed in the NFC.

==== NFC Divisional Playoff: vs. #6 New Orleans Saints ====
NFC Divisional Playoff: #6 New Orleans Saints at #1 Seattle Seahawks – Game summary

Quarter	1	2	3	4	Total
Saints	0	0	0	15	15
Seahawks	6	10	0	7	23

at CenturyLink Field, Seattle

- Date: January 11, 2014
- Game time: 1:36 p.m. local
- Game weather: rain, 48 °F (9 °C), 75% humidity, wind S 20 miles per hour (32 km/h)
- Game attendance: 68,388
- Referee: Terry McAulay
- TV announcers (Fox): Kevin Burkhardt, John Lynch & Erin Andrews
- Gamecenter, Gamebook

Game information

First quarter

- SEA – Stephen Hauschka 38-yard field goal, 10:19. Seahawks 3–0. Drive: 6 plays, 20 yards, 3:20.
- SEA – Stephen Hauschka 49-yard field goal, 0:37. Seahawks 6–0. Drive: 9 plays, 34 yards. 4:26.

Second quarter

- SEA – Marshawn Lynch 15-yard run (Stephen Hauschka kick), 14:17. Seahawks 13–0. Drive: 2 plays, 24 yards, 0:34.
- SEA – Stephen Hauschka 26-yard field goal, 1:18. Seahawks 16–0. Drive: 12 plays, 63 yards, 4:44.

Third quarter

- No scoring plays.

Fourth quarter

- NO – Khiry Robinson 1-yard run (Mark Ingram run), 13:11. Seahawks 16–8. Drive: 9 plays, 74 yards, 4:27.
- SEA – Marshawn Lynch 31-yard run (Stephen Hauschka kick), 2:40. Seahawks 23–8. Drive: 4 plays, 62 yards, 1:11.
- NO – Marques Colston 9-yard pass from Drew Brees (Shayne Graham kick), 0:26. Seahawks 23–15. Drive: 9 plays, 80 yards, 2:14.

Top passers

- NO – Drew Brees: 24/43, 309 yds, 1 TD
- SEA – Russell Wilson: 9/18, 103 yds

Top rushers

- NO – Khiry Robinson: 13 car, 57 yds, 1 TD
- SEA – Marshawn Lynch: 28 car, 140 yds, 2 TD

Top receivers

- NO – Marques Colston: 11 rec, 144 yds, 1 TD
- SEA – Doug Baldwin: 2 rec, 30 yds

Top tacklers

- NO – David Hawthorne: 4 solo, 5 asst
- SEA – Kam Chancellor: 4 solo, 10 asst, 2 pd

Team – pass – rush – total – to

- NO – 301 – 108 – 409 – 1
- SEA – 103 – 174 – 277 – 0

The Seattle Seahawks defeated the New Orleans Saints 23–15 in the Divisional Round.. Seahawks' Marshawn Lynch scored two touchdowns, one on a 15-yard run and another on a 31-yard run. The Saints were able to cut into the Seahawks' lead with fourth quarter touchdowns by Khiry Robinson and Marques Colston. However, the Seahawks were able to hold on a final trick play attempt by the Saints. With the win, Seattle advanced to the NFC Championship.

==== NFC Championship Game: vs. #5 San Francisco 49ers ====
NFC Championship Game: #5 San Francisco 49ers at #1 Seattle Seahawks – Game summary

Quarter	1	2	3	4	Total
49ers	3	7	7	0	17
Seahawks	0	3	10	10	23

at CenturyLink Field, Seattle

- Date: January 19, 2014
- Game time: 3:42 p.m. local
- Game weather: cloudy, 43 °F (6 °C), 88% humidity, wind NE 1 mile per hour (1.6 km/h)
- Game attendance: 68,454
- Referee: Gene Steratore
- TV announcers (Fox): Joe Buck, Troy Aikman, Pam Oliver & Erin Andrews
- Gamecenter, Gamebook

Game information

First quarter

- SF – Phil Dawson 25-yard field goal, 12:45. 49ers 3–0. Drive: 4 plays, 8 yards, 2:05.

Second quarter

- SF – Anthony Dixon 1-yard run (Phil Dawson kick), 10:03. 49ers 10–0. Drive: 9 plays, 86 yards, 4:46.
- SEA – Stephen Hauschka 32-yard field goal, 5:47. 49ers 10–3. Drive: 9 plays, 62 yards, 4:16.

Third quarter

- SEA – Marshawn Lynch 40-yard run (Stephen Hauschka kick), 9:51. Tied 10–10. Drive: 4 plays, 60 yards, 2:15.
- SF – Anquan Boldin 26-yard pass from Colin Kaepernick (Phil Dawson kick), 6:29. 49ers 17–10. Drive: 6 plays, 83 yards, 3:22.
- SEA – Stephen Hauschka 40-yard field goal, 3:55. 49ers 17–13. Drive: 5 plays, 11 yards, 2:34.

Fourth quarter

- SEA – Jermaine Kearse 35-yard pass from Russell Wilson (Stephen Hauschka kick), 13:44. Seahawks 20–17. Drive: 8 plays, 62 yards, 4:03.
- SEA – Stephen Hauschka 47-yard field goal, 3:37. Seahawks 23–17. Drive: 7 plays, 11 yards, 4:00.

Top passers

- SF – Colin Kaepernick: 14/24, 153 yds, 1 TD, 2 INT
- SEA – Russell Wilson: 16/25, 215 yds, 1 TD

Top rushers

- SF – Colin Kaepernick: 11 car, 130 yds
- SEA – Marshawn Lynch: 22 car, 109 yds, 1 TD

Top receivers

- SF – Anquan Boldin: 5 rec, 53 yds, 1 TD
- SEA – Doug Baldwin: 6 rec, 106 yds

Top tacklers

- SF – NaVorro Bowman: 6 solo, 8 asst, sack, tfl, ff
- SEA – Bobby Wagner: 5 solo, 10 asst

Team – pass – rush – total – to

- SF – 147 – 161 – 308 – 3
- SEA – 193 – 115 – 308 – 1

This was the Seahawks' first conference Championship game appearance since 2005 and only the third ever for the franchise, after 2005 and 1983. The Seahawks overcame a 10–3 deficit at the end of the half and finished strong, outscoring San Francisco 20–7 in the 2nd half. With Seattle leading 20–17 in the 4th quarter, Colin Kaepernick tried to rally his team, but fumbled once and threw 2 interceptions in the final three drives in the game for San Francisco. In the fourth quarter, NaVorro Bowman suffered a major knee injury on a tackle and forced fumble near the goal line, but the 49ers forced another fumble on the next play on 4th down. On the second play following fumble recovery, Kaepernick threw an interception to Kam Chancellor. Kaepernick again had the 49ers in position to try for a win, but his pass to Michael Crabtree in the end zone was deflected by Richard Sherman and intercepted by Malcolm Smith, locking up the win for Seattle.

==== Super Bowl XLVIII: vs. #A1 Denver Broncos ====
Super Bowl XLVIII: #N1 Seattle Seahawks vs. #A1 Denver Broncos – Game summary

Quarter	1	2	3	4	Total
Seahawks	8	14	14	7	43
Broncos	0	0	8	0	8

at MetLife Stadium, East Rutherford, New Jersey

- Date: February 2, 2014
- Game time: 6:32 p.m. local
- Game weather: partly cloudy, 49 °F (9 °C), 63% humidity, wind WNW 4 miles per hour (6.4 km/h)
- Game attendance: 82,529
- Referee: Terry McAulay
- TV announcers (Fox): Joe Buck, Troy Aikman, Pam Oliver & Erin Andrews
- Gamecenter, Gamebook

Game information

First quarter

- SEA – Safety, Cliff Avril tackled Knowshon Moreno in end zone, 14:48. Seahawks 2–0.
- SEA – Stephen Hauschka 31-yard field goal, 10:21. Seahawks 5–0. Drive: 9 plays, 51 yards, 4:27.
- SEA – Stephen Hauschka 33-yard field goal, 2:16. Seahawks 8–0. Drive: 13 plays, 58 yards, 6:15.

Second quarter

- SEA – Marshawn Lynch 1-yard run (Stephen Hauschka kick), 12:00. Seahawks 15–0. Drive: 7 plays, 37 yards, 3:59.
- SEA – Malcolm Smith 69-yard interception return (Stephen Hauschka kick), 3:21. Seahawks 22–0.

Third quarter

- SEA – Percy Harvin 87-yard kickoff return (Stephen Hauschka kick), 14:48. Seahawks 29–0. Drive: 0 plays, 0 yards, 0:12.
- SEA – Jermaine Kearse 23-yard pass from Russell Wilson (Stephen Hauschka kick), 2:58. Seahawks 36–0. Drive: 6 plays, 58 yards, 2:57.
- DEN – Demaryius Thomas 14-yard pass from Peyton Manning (Wes Welker pass from Peyton Manning), 0:00. Seahawks 36–8. Drive: 6 plays, 80 yards, 2:58.

Fourth quarter

- SEA – Doug Baldwin 10-yard pass from Russell Wilson (Stephen Hauschka kick), 11:45. Seahawks 43–8. Drive: 5 plays, 48 yards, 3:15.

Top passers

- SEA – Russell Wilson: 18/25, 206 yds, 2 TD
- DEN – Peyton Manning: 34/49, 280 yds, 1 TD, 2 INT

Top rushers

- SEA – Percy Harvin: 2 car, 45 yds
- DEN – Knowshon Moreno: 5 car, 17 yds

Top receivers

- SEA – Doug Baldwin: 5 rec, 66 yds, 1 TD
- DEN – Demaryius Thomas: 13 rec, 118 yds, 1 TD

Top tacklers

- SEA – Bobby Wagner: 5 solo, 5 asst
- DEN –Danny Trevathan: 7 solo, 5 asst, tfl

Team – pass – rush – total – to

- DEN – 279 – 27 – 306 – 4
- SEA – 206 – 135 – 341 – 0

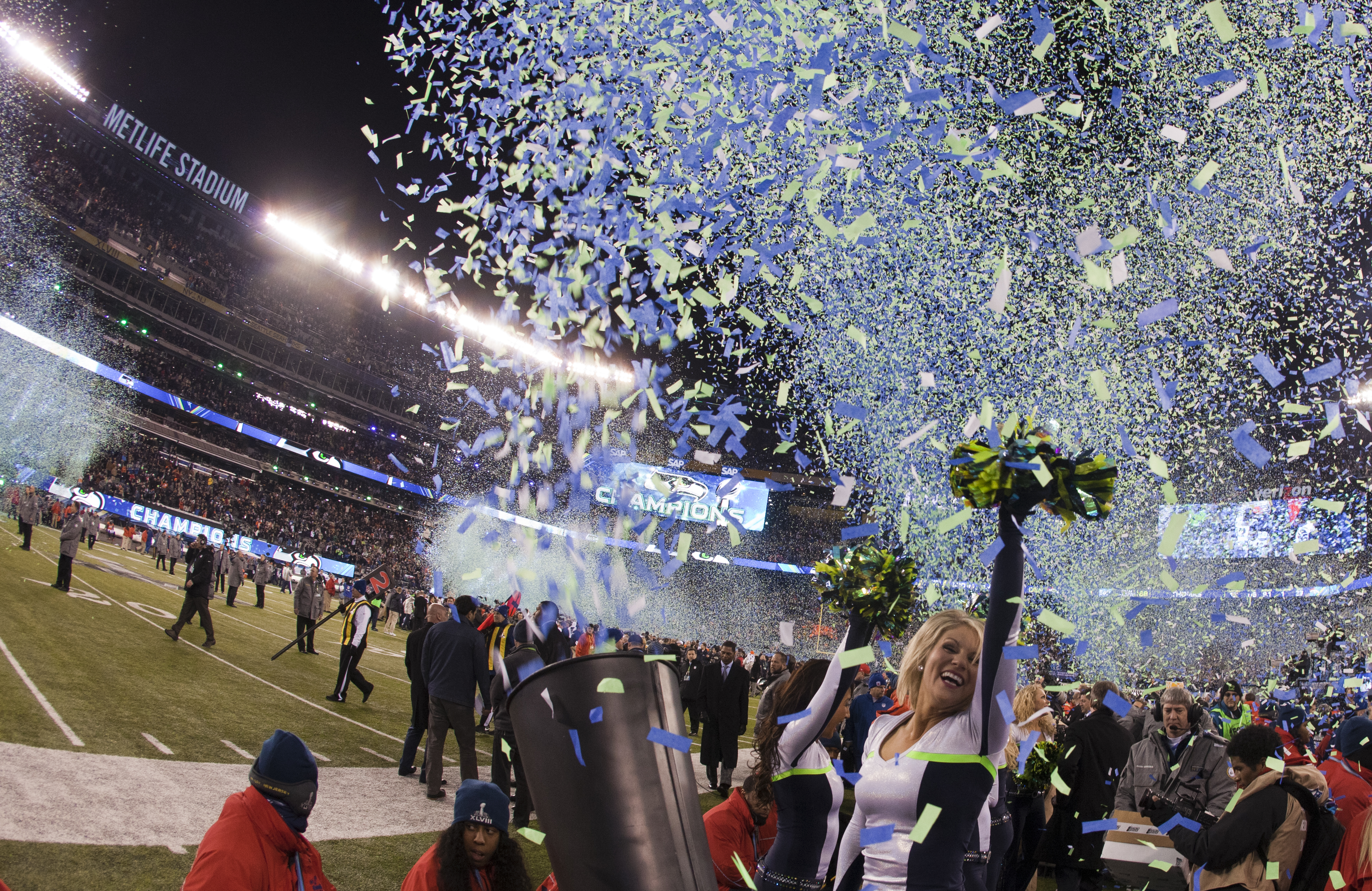
The Seattle Seahawks celebrate their Super Bowl XLVIII victory

In dominating fashion, the Seahawks won their first championship in the history of the franchise. This was also the first football team since the 1990 Buffalo Bills to not have any players on the roster with Super Bowl experience. It was Seattle's first major championship in 35 years since the 1979 Seattle SuperSonics. Linebacker Malcolm Smith earned the Super Bowl MVP award for his 69-yard pick-six, 1 fumble recovery, and 6 tackles. The following year, the Seahawks would lose Super Bowl XLIX to Tom Brady and the New England Patriots 28–24.
