= Frank W. Cox High School =

Public high school in Virginia, US

Coordinates: 36°53′13.7″N 76°3′6.8″W

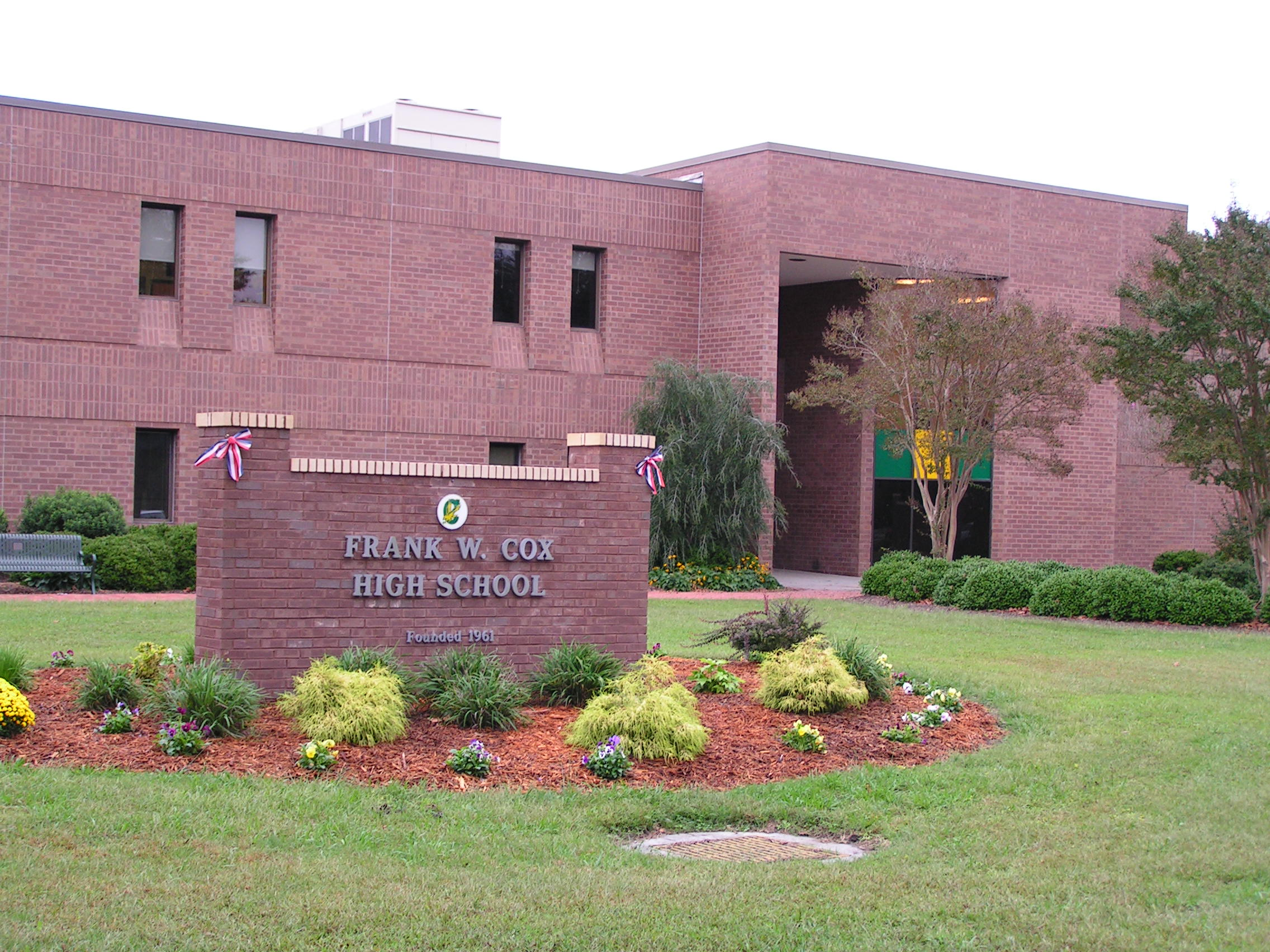

Location
- 2425 Shorehaven Drive; Virginia Beach, Virginia 23454; United States

Information
- School type: Public, high school
- Motto: Dedicated to Excellence
- Founded: 1961
- Locale: City, Large
- School district: Virginia Beach City Public Schools
- NCES District ID: 5103840
- Superintendent: Donald Robertson
- NCES School ID: 510384002049
- Principal: Melissa George
- Teaching staff: 90.80 (on an FTE basis)
- Grades: 9–12
- Enrollment: 1,631 (2024–25)
- Student to teacher ratio: 17.96
- Colors: Forest Green, Gold, and Silver
- Athletics conference: Virginia High School League; Beach District; Eastern Region
- Mascot: Falcons
- Rival: First Colonial High School
- Communities served: Broad Bay Colony, Church Point
- Website: Official site

Frank W. Cox High School is a secondary school located in the Great Neck subdivision of Virginia Beach, Virginia. It was founded in 1961 as the Northeast Junior High School, but upon opening, it was named after a former superintendent of Virginia Beach City Public Schools, Frank Woodard Cox, who led the school division from 1933 to 1968. A replacement building, also designated as a primary hurricane shelter, was built nearby, at 2425 Shorehaven Drive. The high school was moved into the new building in the fall of 1983. The original building at 1848 N. Great Neck Road became Great Neck Junior High and then Great Neck Middle School. The original building was demolished in 2012.

== Academic and athletic honors ==
Frank W. Cox has an 80% annual passing rate on Advanced Placement Tests, with two out of three graduating students passing with an advanced diploma. The school has been recognized by major organizations such as Newsweek, which named the high school as a "top" public high school. Cox has an array of sports teams. Its field hockey program has won a record 23 state titles. The music program, student newspaper, and student yearbook won Blue ribbon awards in 2018.

The school has won fifty six state athletic titles. It has been awarded the Virginia High School League Wachovia Cup for outstanding academic and athletic achievement eight out of 17 times, more than any other school.

Cox High School's WorldQuest team has won the regional WorldQuest competition (a competition in geopolitical knowledge, current events, and geography) more than any other school in Hampton Roads, most recently the 2011 WorldQuest competition hosted by the World Affairs Council of Greater Hampton Roads. The school no longer hosts WorldQuest, however.

Cox is one of five Virginia Beach high schools ranked in the top 2600 in Newsweek's 2006 ranking of American high schools.

== Music honors ==
The Cox Marching Falcons competed in the 2011 USSBA (now known as U.S. Bands) Group II open national championships, and placed 1st overall with a score of 95.738, with captions in visual performance, overall effect, and colorguard. The band is also a current six-time state championship program, winning the 2010 USSBA group I open Virginia state championships, the 2011 USSBA group II open Virginia state championships, the 2012 USBANDS group III open Virginia state championships, and the 2015 USBANDS Group III State Championships. The Cox Marching Falcons now compete in the VMBC Circuit.

== Notable alumni ==
- Felicia Barton - American Idol finalist
- Vernon Berg, III - US Navy officer, artist.
- Eric Bird - soccer player
- Ross Burbank - NFL football player
- Jason Dubois - baseball player
- Chandler Fenner Super Bowl Champion, played football in the NFL, CFL, and the College of the Holy Cross
- Michael Hearst - composer, musician, author
- Genesis the Greykid aka Russ - poet, artist, creative
- Bubba Jenkins - NCAA Champion wrestler; current professional MMA fighter
- Zachary Knighton - actor
- Jared MacEachern - Machine Head bassist/backing vocals
- Quintessa Swindell - actor
- Stefanie Fee - US Field Hockey Olympic Team player (Olympics 2012 and 2016)
- Ryan McGinness - artist
- Chris Taylor - baseball player
- Brinson Paolini - professional golfer
- Tayvion Robinson - professional football wide receiver
- Todd Schnitt - longtime nationally syndicated radio personality
- Jordan Williams - gridiron football defensive lineman

== See also ==
- AAA Eastern Region
- AAA Beach District
