= Chris Stylez =

American singer-songwriter

- Born: Christopher Allen; Ottawa, Ontario, Canada
- Genres: R&B
- Occupations: Singer-songwriter; record producer
- Instruments: Keyboard, guitar, synthesizer, sequencer
- Years active: 2008–present

Christopher Allen, better known by his stage name Chris Stylez, is a Canadian R&B singer, songwriter, and record producer. His 2014 song "Who Is" became popular on the now-defunct video platform Vine and appeared on the Spotify Viral 50 and U.K. Viral 10 charts. His first mainstream exposure was an appearance on the BET "Music Matters" initiative.

Stylez was born in Ottawa, Ontario, Canada and spent most of his life making music. At a young age, Stylez learned to play guitar from Ronnie "Bop" Williams from The Wailers. In 2008, he recorded his first single "Fade Away" which gained international airplay. In 2010, he relocated from Canada to New York City in the hopes of furthering his career. He is influenced by Marvin Gaye and D'Angelo.

== Discography ==
=== Albums ===
- In Late Out Very Early, January 25, 2019

=== EP ===
- Superstar, November 2013
- Dreamer, June 4, 2013
- Who Is, February 5, 2016

=== Singles ===
- Relapse, August 5, 2016

=== Guest appearances ===
Consequence (rapper) – "Couped Up" feat. DJ Swivel & Chris Stylez on DJ Whoo Kid – BET Awards Mixtape '06, Clinton Sparks – The Cons Vol. 4 2006

Kanye West featuring Charlie Wilson & Chris Stylez – "Brothers" – Promotional Single
