= Tayvion Robinson =

American football player (born 2000)

Profile
- Position: Wide receiver

Personal information
- Born: October 1, 2000 (age 26); Virginia Beach, Virginia, U.S.
- Listed height: 5 ft 11 in (1.80 m)
- Listed weight: 190 lb (86 kg)

Career information
- High school: Frank W. Cox (Virginia Beach, Virginia)
- College: Virginia Tech (2019–2021); Kentucky (2022–2023)
- NFL draft: 2024: undrafted

Career history
- Baltimore Ravens (2024)*; Carolina Panthers (2024)*
- * Offseason or practice squad member only
- Stats at Pro Football Reference

Tayvion Robinson (born October 1, 2000) is an American professional football wide receiver. He played college football for the Virginia Tech Hokies and the Kentucky Wildcats.

== Early life ==
Robinson attended high school at Frank W. Cox. Coming out of high school, Robinson held offers from schools such as Maryland, Ohio State, Nebraska, Virginia, and South Carolina. Robinson ultimately decided to commit to play college football for the Virginia Tech Hokies.

== College career ==
=== Virginia Tech ===
In Robinson's freshman season with the Hokies in 2019, he totaled 31 receptions for 404 yards and a touchdown, while also adding 132 rushing yards. In the 2020 season, Robinson made 38 catches for 592 yards and three touchdown, while also rushing for 48 yards. During the 2021 season, Robinson tallied 44 receptions for 559 yards and five touchdowns. After the conclusion of the 2021 season, Robinson decided to enter the NCAA transfer portal.

Robinson finished his career at Virginia Tech with 113 receptions for 1,155 yards and nine touchdowns, while also rushing for 227 yards in 29 carries.

=== Kentucky ===
Robinson decided to transfer to play for the Kentucky Wildcats. In Robinson's debut with Kentucky, he hauled in six receptions for 136 yards in a win over Miami Ohio. In week four of the 2022 season, Robinson made seven catches for 147 yards and two touchdowns, as he helped the Wildcats beat Northern Illinois. During Robinson's first season with the Wildcats in 2022 he hauled in 40 receptions for 497 yards and three touchdowns, while also adding 38 rushing yards. During the 2023 season, Robinson brought in 37 receptions for 507 yards and four touchdowns. After the conclusion of the 2023 season, Robinson declared for the 2024 NFL draft.

== Professional career ==
Pre-draft measurables
Height	Weight	Arm length	Hand span	40-yard dash	10-yard split	20-yard split	20-yard shuttle	Three-cone drill	Vertical jump	Broad jump	Bench press
5 ft 10 1/2 in (1.79 m)	191 lb (87 kg)	31 in (0.79 m)	9 1/4 in (0.23 m)	4.76 s	1.62 s	2.78 s	4.56 s	7.02 s	32.0 in (0.81 m)	9 ft 9 in (2.97 m)	13 reps
All values from NFL Combine/Pro Day

=== Baltimore Ravens ===
Robinson signed with the Baltimore Ravens as an undrafted free agent on May 3, 2024. He was waived by the Ravens on June 26.

=== Carolina Panthers ===
Robinson signed with the Carolina Panthers on July 30, 2024. He was waived/injured on August 19.
