= Genesis the Greykid =

American rapper

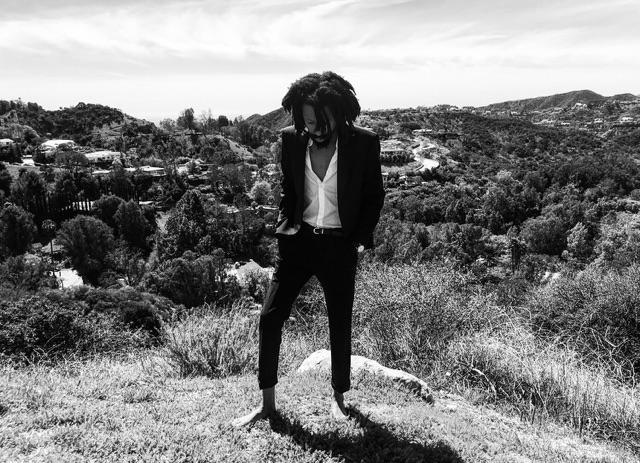
- Genesis in 2018

Background information
- Also known as: Genesis the Greykid
- Born: Russell McGee Jr.
- Occupations: Poet; Fine Art; Creative; Ghost Writer
- Website: ThroughTheGrey.com

Russell McGee Jr, better known as Genesis the Greykid, is a fine artist, poet, creative director, and underground hip-hop artist who was co-signed by the Media Label Creative Control TV (which used to be under the DD172 umbrella) by filming duo/CEO's Coodie & Chike. As of July 13, 2021, one of Genesis paintings titled 'Computer Love' sold for $87,000 at Phillips (auctioneers) in London. The painting went for almost ten times its estimates. He became one of the few emerging Fine Art Poets in 2016, selling over $12,000 in poems his first two-hour exhibition in Chattanooga, Tennessee, titled "Through the Grey". He created the 48x48 inch painting used for the song "Brothers", by rapper Kanye West and singer Charlie Wilson.

== Early life ==
Genesis was born in Chattanooga, Tennessee, while his dad was stationed in Georgia. Although his father was in the military and they moved around a lot, he spent a lot of time in Virginia Beach, Virginia, where he attended First Colonial High School his freshman year then transferred to Frank W. Cox High School until he graduated. Inspired by legendary poet T. S. Eliot, Genesis showed an early interest in poetry and would later credit it as his reasons for getting involved with hip hop and Fine Art.

== Career ==
=== Music ===
Genesis started out ghost writing before coming out as an artist in the early part of 2010 with his first mix tape titled "Grey Skies". Later that year he released "Grey Skies 2" which included a track directed at Pharrell Williams called "Note To Pharrell" a.k.a. "I Just Wanna Be A Writer". Toward the end of 2010, Genesis the Greykid was introduced to Coodie & Chike who co-signed him to Creative Control TV and shot the video "Here We Are" in 2011 for the artist. Genesis the Greykid was one of the many performers at Baltimore's African American Festival (2011). He explains in a XXL Magazine interview, "I wanna take everyday conversation, put it into poetry, and use music to touch people where my hands may not reach. Changing the game by making something worth making, as humbly as I can.

=== Fine Art - PoAnguardia ===
After spending part of 2016 travelling 5,800 miles around the country by train and foot, Genesis was inspired to gather all the poems he'd written along the way, and turn them into large poetic mantras. Using oil, Genesis created 12 large Fine Art pieces that were presented in his travelling poetic experience "Through the Grey", with the goal in mind of pushing poetry beyond its current boundaries. "I’ve had some great people rocking with me through the process. Some really diverse patrons buying the work, from Pat (Chance the Rapper’s Manager) to Bmimms (CEO of Mogul Management), to Ted Alling (Founder of Access America Transport VC Lampost Group, and Dynamo), really grateful for everything that’s happening right now."

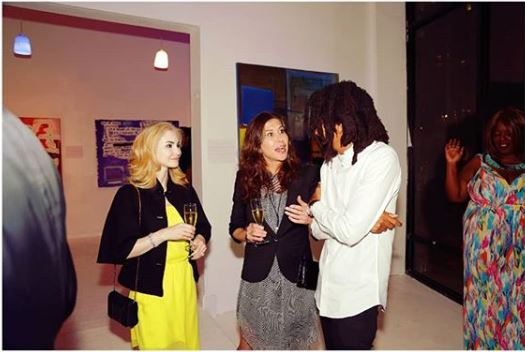
Gillian Wynn Early at Genesis fine art exhibition LA April 2018.

Genesis has defined his style of artwork as PoAnguardia. In an interview with Taylor Dall at Emcee Network, he explained the origin of its title: "It’s a poetic way of expressing new thresholds unfolding in the internal and/or external, through fine art. Conflating the word Poem or Poesia & Avanguardia."

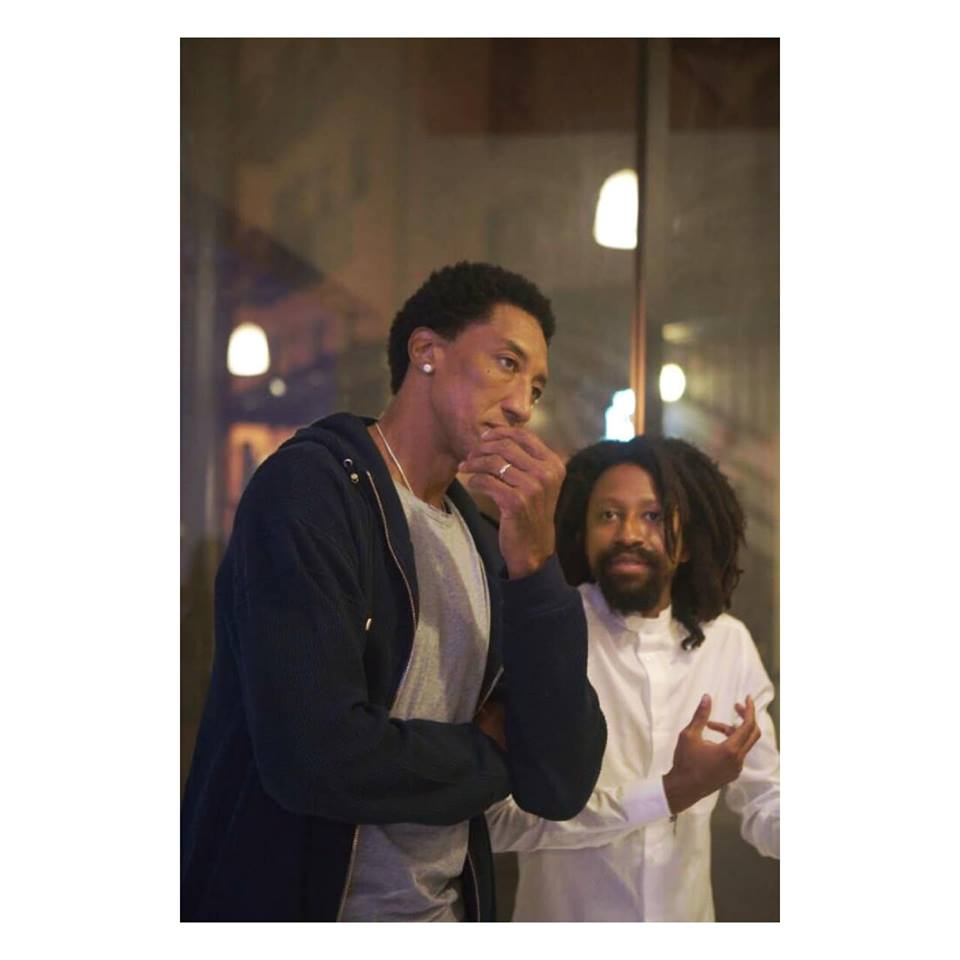
Genesis the Greykid and Scottie Pippen talking about his artwork during the "Through the Grey" exhibition.

Genesis continues to have solo exhibitions around the country, "In fact, the last four months (March - July) he has traveled from one side of the country to the other meeting some high-profile people, rubbing elbows with Tesla founder Elon Musk, Oscar-winning actress Halle Berry and former NBA star Scottie Pippen leading to a highly successful gallery exhibit in Los Angeles." Genesis has made his "Through The Grey" exhibition an annual experience in Chattanooga, Tennessee, that occurs Dec. 1st of each year. Genesis says he sees, or hears, poetry in almost everything, from conversations with friends to his mother's laughter. Most of his paintings are created by simply turning on some jazz music and seeing what happens. He has done some commission work, including coffee tables painted as part of a project with Shaquille O'Neal.

=== Creative Director ===
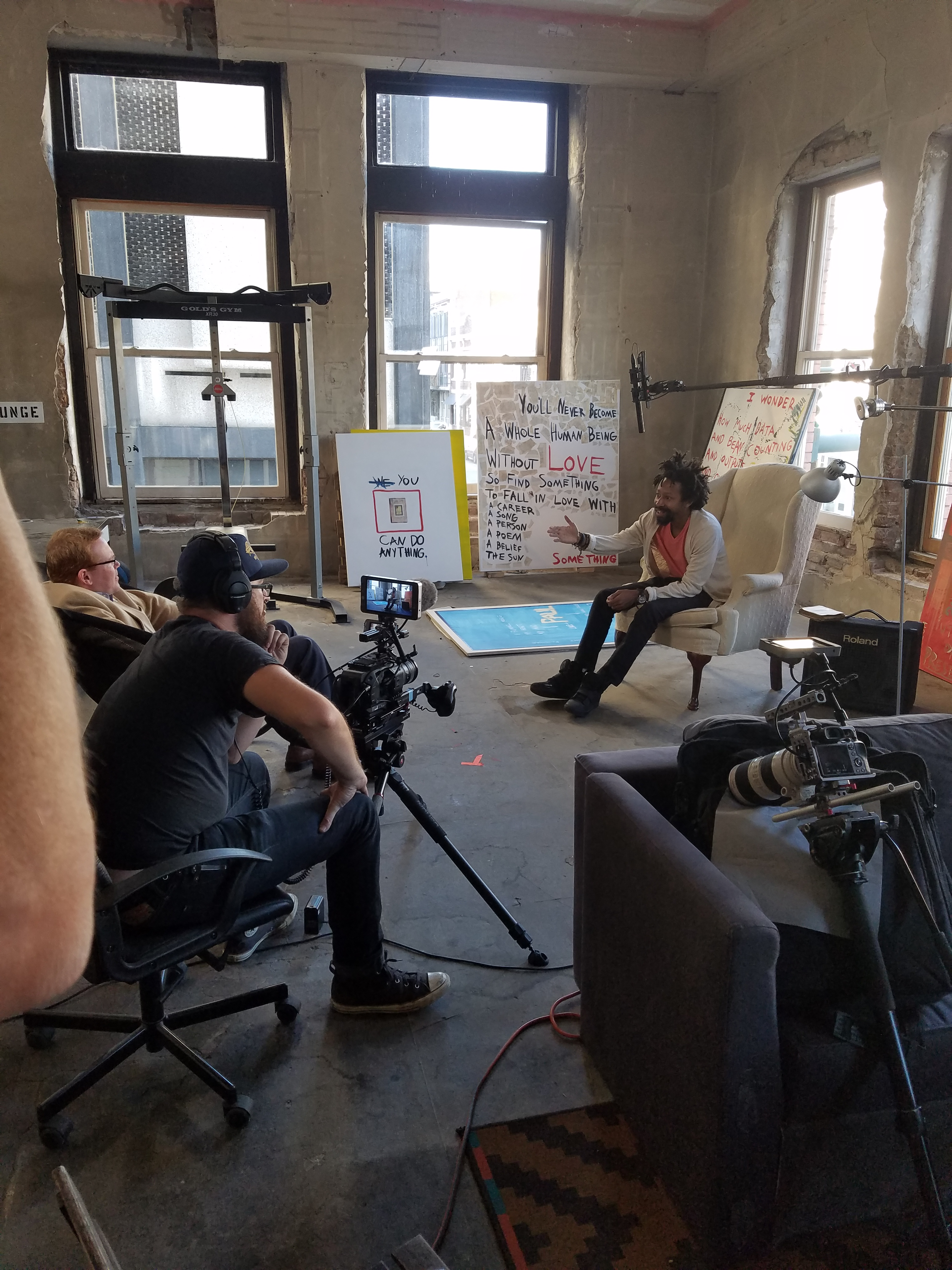
Genesis being interviewed inside his studio by the Tennessee Entertainment Commission about his poetry and art.

After his "Grey Matter" project in New York City, Genesis wanted to help creative outlets in Chattanooga and Virginia draw attention to the many politically and socially conscious artists who create music, art, and poetry. He soon started conducting poetry / creative sessions (or workshops) at different studios collaborating with different non-profits and art communities in Chattanooga, Tn. When asked in an interview about his creative interest, Genesis explains "Yeah, I'm a creator. Music/poetry is a medium I enjoy creating through, but I love all elements of creation...be it ideas for some marketing strategy, copywriting, short stories, etc. I just love being a part of projects that value creative people and allow them to build. It's hard to beat the grand feeling of making ideas tangible." February 27, 2015 Genesis was nominated for a YP Award for his Civic Impact through the Build Me A World project, mentoring and developing young creatives, poets, and artist who in large part came from some of the most chaotic areas in the city. Genesis and WMWA Landscape Architects won the 2021 National American Society of Landscape Architects (ASLA) Honor Award in Urban Design. He played the role of Creative & Art director, coming up with and implementing creative breakout sessions with tenant's and shareholders to gather critical data for engineers & landscape designers to work with. These incites would provide the scaffolding for all artwork and design for the Market + Georgia project.

"Genesis with former professional basketball player, and current Inside the NBA analyst, Shaquille O’Neal to create Genesis x Shaq coffee tables. The collection is currently sold out. His art has managed to draw in customers from all walks of life. From eccentric tastes, a Wyoming cattle wrangler, to super wealthy people and families that have been saving up for almost two years to invest in a piece. 'The skeletons of any good poem is honesty and truth,' Genesis explained. 'It’s the same with artwork. When you put truth out, it moves people – you’re going deep into the well. It might be something they’ve been struggling with, too. The truth flows between the artist and the consumer, and in that connection lies the Divine.'"

=== Poetry & Creative Workshop ===
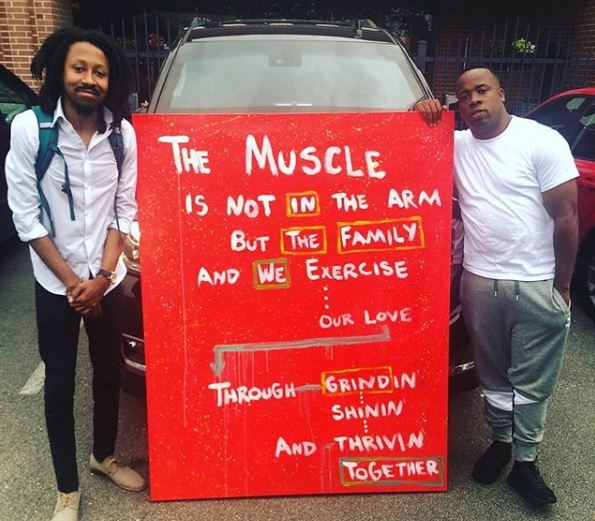
Genesis, standing next to a piece commissioned for the Rapper and music executive Yo Gotti.

"For Genesis, living as a career poet feels completely natural, because poetry is more than something he puts out into the world. It’s how he sees the world, how he takes it in...But Genesis’s work as a poet goes beyond pen and paper. In Chattanooga, he’s made a name for himself by offering his poetic perspective in the form of a service. He attracts a range of corporate and startup clients who are searching for fresh ways to view or approach something — their work, their audience, their office space, each other." On July 6, 2015, Genesis decided to release a collection of his poetry titled "Words In Grey". He mentions inside the flap of this 116-page book, "I developed a poetic/creative workshop [in January 2014] people in the community started calling 'Words In Grey'. In these workshops, I would get artist to think differently about the creative self, their writing, and collectively explore the pathway to that 'hidden wholeness' inside of us, through creative sessions and poetry. So this first book, 'Words In Grey' is a collection of my poetry with exercises in the back of the book so the reader can venture off into their own brilliance."

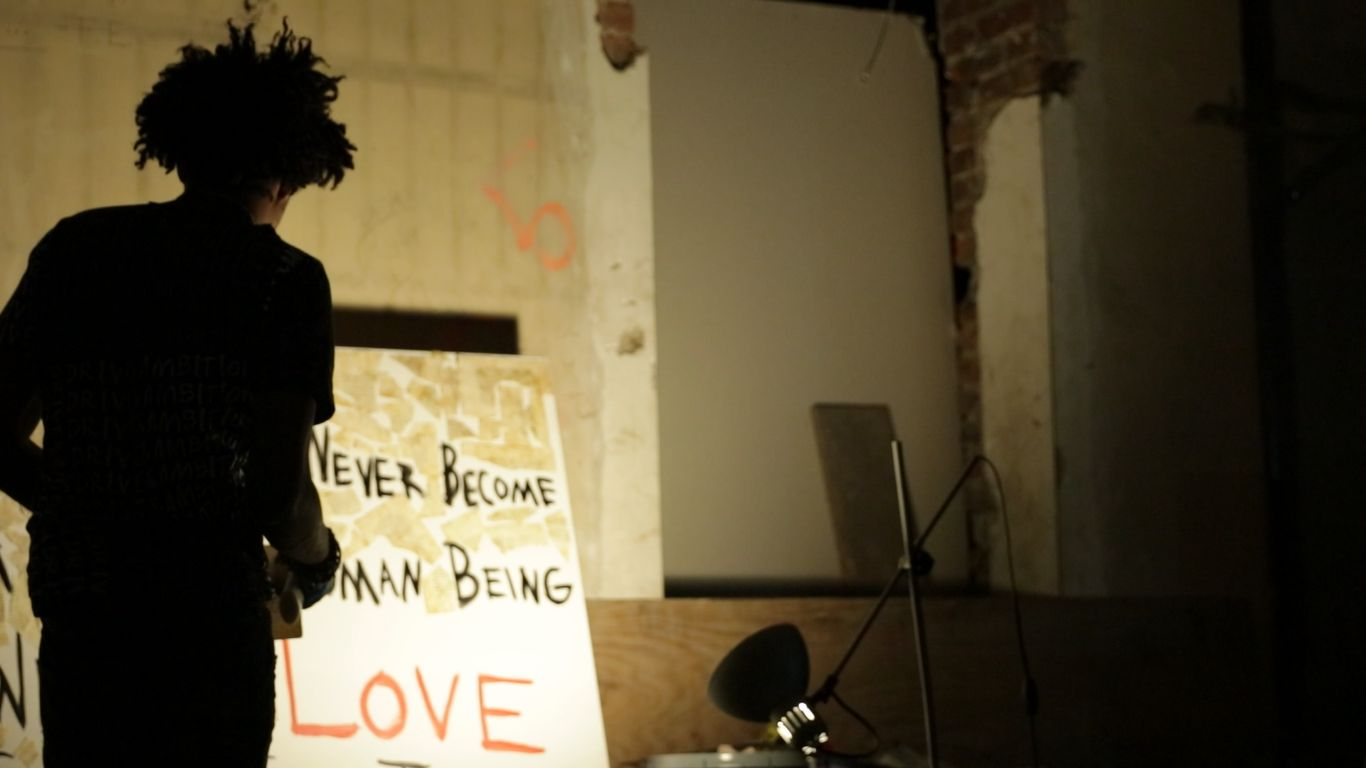
Genesis inside his studio, creating the poem "Love Something", which he sold during his "Through the Grey" exhibition on December 1, 2016, for $8,500 USD.

Always creating and welcoming others to do the same, "In June, he spent nearly four weeks in the Hamptons creating new works (fine art) with artist/designer/illustrator Audrey Schilt, an illustrator for the fashion designer Halston for many years (and former Ralph Lauren VP), and he was the featured artist at the Aspen Institute Socrates Program, a three-day workshop for 100 of the world's best and brightest. It included industry leaders, attorneys, White House staffers and Howard Warren Buffett, an associate professor at Columbia University and the grandson of business magnate/philanthropist Warren Buffett. Most of the people on the guest list had founder and co-founder next to their names." Through the 2 day session Genesis had, he goes on to say, "The first thing I did was have them write a poem about their shoes...from the perspective of their shoes." Then he showed them a video of an emotionally charged, real-life courtroom scene of a father confronting the man who had killed his son. "I had them write about that from any perspective they wanted," Genesis says. "It could be the father, the man on trial, the judge, the clock on the wall, the woman's purse on the bench. It didn't matter, as long as they owned it."

In a Chattanooga Times Free Press article, Barry Courter mentions, "Since moving here (Chattanooga), he has devoted himself to creative endeavors, many in his studio at the Fancy Rhino offices in the Loveman's Building downtown. Soundcorp Executive Director Stratton Tingle attended one of Genesis' seminars 'on a whim because I had heard about them' and was inspired enough to attend several more. 'I had no idea what I was getting into, and pretty quickly he had me writing and reciting a poem in front of people, which is not something I'm comfortable with,' Tingle says. 'He stretched me in ways I'm not familiar with. I was pretty immediately struck by his creativity.'" In the summer of 2017, Genesis through his "Words In Grey" workshop in collaboration with Mark Making had "teens explore neighborhood issues affecting their lives through poetry, such as poverty, gang violence, and racism, and then expressed solutions to these problems in graffiti inspired murals."

=== Music Videos ===
- 2014 retroGREY aka Dark Matter shot by Genesis Elijah.
- 2012 "Do you Know", shot by Coodie & Chike.
- 2012 "A Thought", shot by Coodie & Chike.
- 2011" Here We Are", shot by Coodie & Chike.
- 2011 "Music / Braille & Sign Language", shot by Brenner Vas.
- 2010 "Note to Pharrell aka I Just Wanna Be a Writer", shot by Brenner Vas.

=== Discography ===
- Grey Skies (2010)
- Grey Skies 2 (2010)
- Grey Skies 3 (2013)

=== Poems ===
- Words In Grey - the book
- I Wrote This In Class
- Seeing the Invisible
- flower
- I left the front door open
