= Brothers (Kanye West song) =

Song by Kanye West featuring Charlie Wilson
- Recorded: 2016–2019
- Genre: Hip-hop; gospel
- Length: 3:45
- Songwriters: Kanye West; Dexter Raymond Mills Jr.; Marcus Vest; Irving Lorenzo, Jr.; Roosevelt Harrell III (Note: Find additional credits for the song on the BMI Repertoire by searching the work number #30930040.)
- Producers: Kanye West; Seven; Irv Gotti; Bink! (co.)

Audio sample
- Part of the first verse to "Brothers": file; help

"Brothers" is a song by American rapper Kanye West featuring American singer Charlie Wilson. Originating as a demo by musicians Seven and Chris Stylez, it was given to West during sessions for his eighth studio album, Ye (2018). Significant portions of the demo version of "Brothers" were adapted for the song "Violent Crimes". It debuted via the season 2 premiere of BET show Tales, but failed to release as a single due to miscommunication between its songwriters and alleged interference from record label Def Jam.

== Background ==
=== 2016–2017: Demo recordings ===
Seven Aurelius had spent much of his time at Agoura Hills, California during 2016, living with Judge Herb Dobell after the death of his mother. He had convinced himself to write every day, spending hours writing songs on a piano (previously owned by Johnny Mercer) until creating the idea for "Brothers" in July 2016; he felt it would be perfect for West.

In November 2017, Irv Gotti hinted on Instagram that he was working on "something enormous" with West. As it turns out, West, Seven, and Gotti met during 2017 sessions for the formers collaborative album with Kid Cudi, Kids See Ghosts (2018). West was keeping a low profile at this time, retreating to his ranch in Jackson Hole, Wyoming to work on music. Gotti and Seven asked Chris Stylez to send in his demos after they got into contact with West, and sent over a record called "Love Songs"; West instantly loved the demo, and elements of it were combined with Seven's demo to make "Brothers".

=== 2018–2019: Ye and "Violent Crimes" ===
On June 5, 2019, Irv Gotti stated in an interview on The Breakfast Club that the season 2 premiere of his show Tales would be "a two-hour season premiere of a brand new record produced by me and my production partner Seven from a huge, huge, huge artist." Gotti stated the artist was from the Midwest and that he's "the biggest, hugest artist who's been the most controversial in the last year." DJ Envy responded with "Ok, Kanye West is gonna be on the season premiere of Tales", to which Irv Gotti replied "I didn't say it! But let's say it right. He's not acting in it, but maybe I have a song ... Envy is a fucking genius!"

Prior to the debut of "Brothers", West had adapted elements of it into the track "Violent Crimes" from his 2018 album Ye. Seven and Gotti were unaware that their song was used in "Violent Crimes", as they were under the impression that "Brothers" as they knew it would appear on the album. Seven recalled his reaction to "Violent Crimes" upon first hearing it in an interview with Forbes: "I didn't hear from him until May or June. And that's when his album came out and I was like, "I hope 'Brothers' is on this thing." And it wasn't. And I was like, "Shit, what happened?" Then I heard a song similar to "Brothers." I'm thinking, "Not only is that very similar to Brothers...that's me playing? What is going on?"

== Composition and lyrics ==
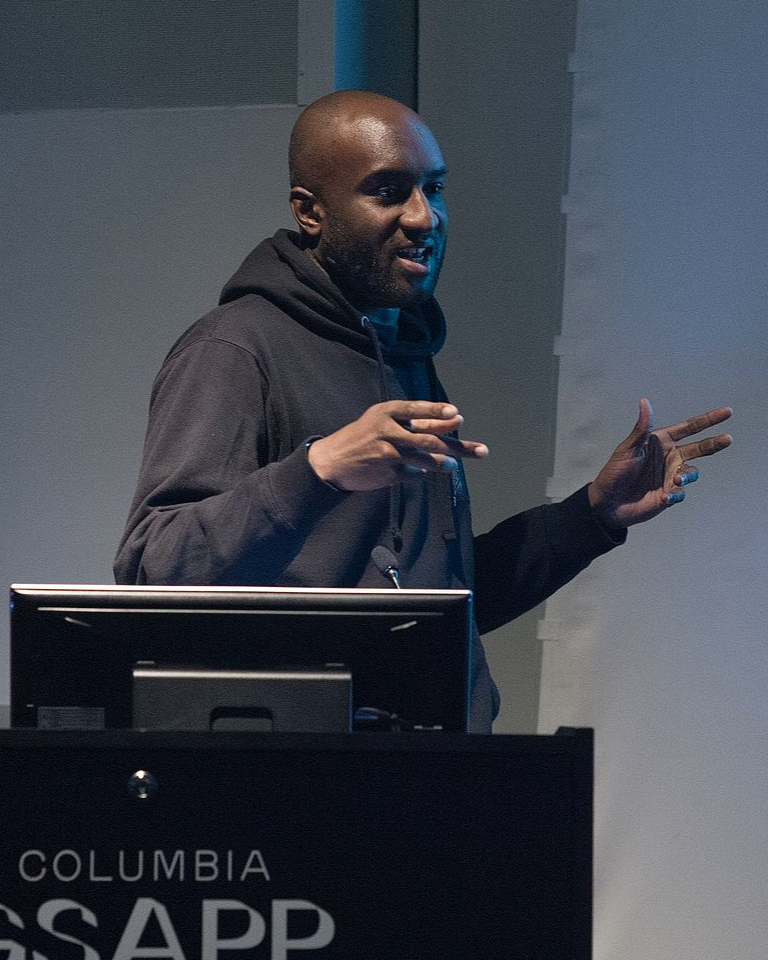
Virgil Abloh (pictured) is heavily referenced in the song's lyrics.

Musically, "Brothers" is a hip-hop and gospel styled track. It features prominent piano and low synth bass sounds. The similarities between the song and "Violent Crimes", which originated from the same demo, has been noted by fans and critics alike.

Regarding his additions to the track, co-producer Bink stated, "7 sent me the reference [track], and I basically treated the reference like a sample and chopped it up. Put the drums on it. Put the bass on it. Structured it.... And it came out dope because it sounded like a loop." The drums on "Brothers" are inspired by those found on West's third album, Graduation (2007), with Bink wanting to give the record an "old school vibe", a feeling Seven shared, as he called Bink due to his work on My Beautiful Dark Twisted Fantasy (2010). Bink used the Akai MPC X when programming the songs drums.

West and longtime creative director Virgil Abloh, who had collaborated on many of his album and single covers, were rumored to have fallen out after Abloh had been appointed artistic director of the Louis Vuitton men's branch; West would later confirm this was true in a 2022 interview. The two reunited for Abloh's debut Paris Fashion Week show, hugging in what many saw as an emotionally charged moment. This moment was referenced in "Brothers" with the line "So I ain't embarrassed or above / Flying out to Paris for a hug". The song appears to be an apology for Abloh, with lyrics about how West has missed him and that it "takes a real one to keep the other in check".

== Artwork ==
Artist Genesis the Greykid, designer of the single art for "Brothers", created the cover while listening to a demo version of the track. He stated that the art was inspired by the idea of brotherhood transcending both biology and linear time, "whether they were blood brothers or brothers in spirit." In his section of Forbes' piece for "Brothers", Greykid stated, "there were other brothers like Quincy Jones and Frank Sinatra. All the way up to Kanye West and Jay-Z. Seven and Gotti. The whole landscape of different types of brothers." These pairings are written across the songs cover art, alongside multiple other pairings of famous individuals.

== Release and promotion ==
The song debuted with the season 2 premiere of the show Tales on July 2, 2019. Speaking on its release, Gotti stated, "producing this new record with my production partner Seven and working with Kanye for a song exclusively for the Tales series has been one of the highlights of my music and TV career". The demo of the track, featuring vocals from Chris Stylez, was released on Seven's website a day later. The track was also posted to Gotti's Instagram in full on July 3, as it was intended to play in full on air, but was cut short due to BET's time slots. Seven's manager stated that the song failed to be released due to poor communication between its songwriters; Seven himself stated the release had been blocked by Def Jam Recordings. Seven has tried multiple times to upload versions of the track on streaming services, either instrumentally or with replaced vocals.

== Personnel ==
Credits adapted from Tales season 2 episode 1, Forbes, and the BMI Repertoire.

- Kanye West – vocals, songwriter, producer
- Charlie Wilson – featured vocals
- Consequence – songwriter
- Seven – songwriter, producter
- Irv Gotti – songwriter, producer
- Bink! – songwriter, co-producer
- Genesis the Greykid – cover art
