= Ross Burbank =

American football player (born 1993)

Profile
- Position: Center

Personal information
- Born: January 27, 1993 (age 33); Virginia Beach, Virginia
- Listed height: 6 ft 4 in (1.93 m)
- Listed weight: 235 lb (107 kg)

Career information
- High school: Virginia Beach (VA) Cox
- College: Virginia
- NFL draft: 2016: undrafted

Career history
- Oakland Raiders (2016)*; Seattle Seahawks (2016–2017)*; Dallas Cowboys (2017)*
- * Offseason or practice squad member only
- Stats at Pro Football Reference

Ross Burbank (born January 27, 1993) is an American football center who is currently a free agent. He played college football at Virginia.

He attended Frank W. Cox High School where he was the football and wrestling team captain. He was the 2010 Virginia AAA wrestling state champion at heavyweight (285lb).

== Professional career ==
=== Oakland Raiders ===
Burbank signed with the Oakland Raiders as an undrafted free agent on May 10, 2016. He was waived on August 29, 2016.

=== Seattle Seahawks ===
On December 28, 2016, Burbank was signed to the Seattle Seahawks' practice squad. He signed a future contract with the Seahawks on January 16, 2017. He was waived on May 9, 2017.

=== Dallas Cowboys ===
On June 2, 2017, Burbank signed with the Dallas Cowboys. He was waived on September 2, 2017.
