= Chandler Fenner =

American football player (born 1990)

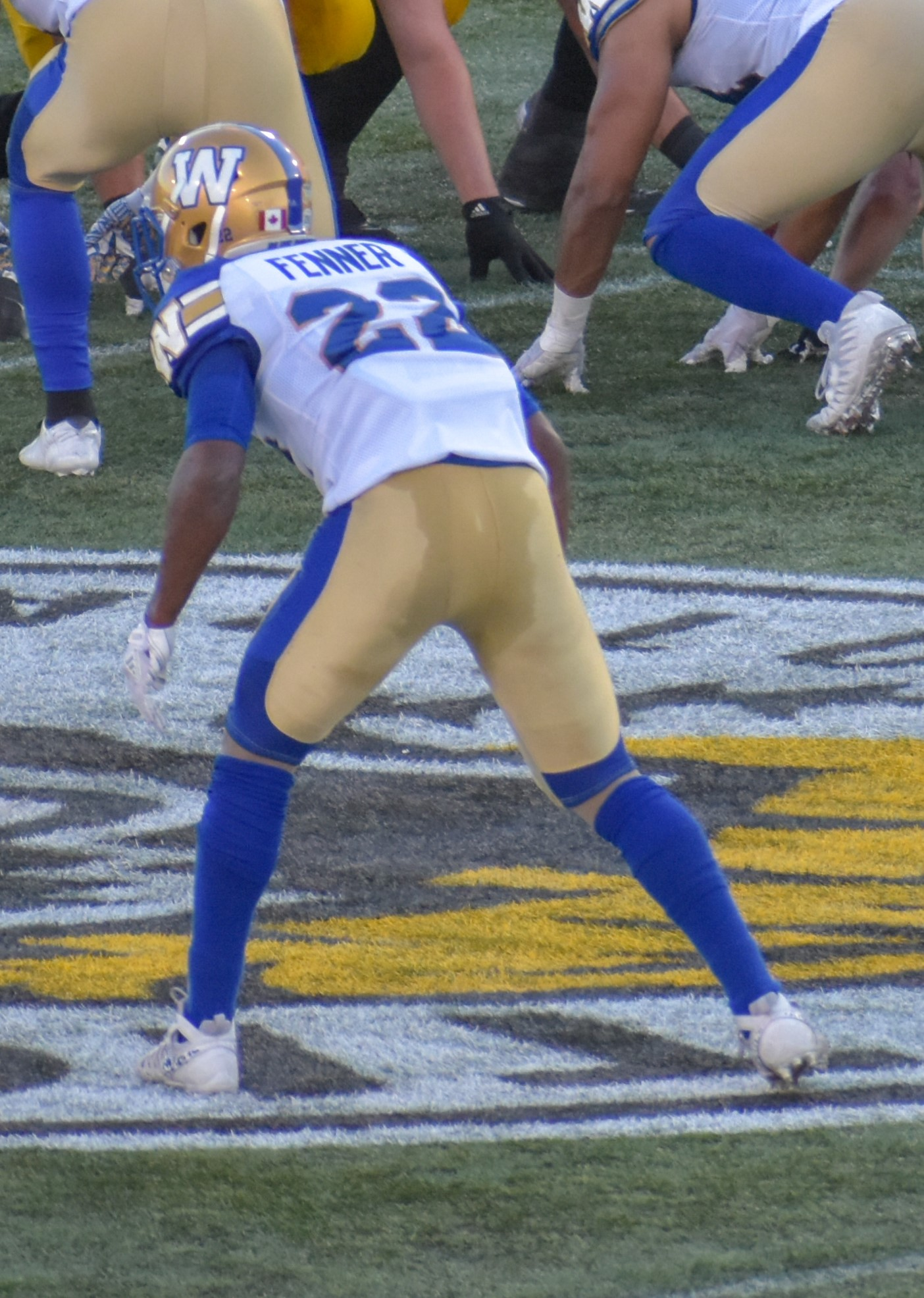
- Fenner with the Winnipeg Blue Bombers in 2018

No. 22, 48
- Position: Cornerback

Personal information
- Born: July 6, 1990 (age 36); Virginia Beach, Virginia, U.S.
- Listed height: 6 ft 1 in (1.85 m)
- Listed weight: 189 lb (86 kg)

Career information
- High school: Cox (Virginia Beach)
- College: Holy Cross
- NFL draft: 2012: undrafted

Career history
- Kansas City Chiefs (2012)*; Seattle Seahawks (2012–2013); New York Giants (2014); BC Lions (2016–2017); Winnipeg Blue Bombers (2018–2019)
- * Offseason or practice squad member only

Awards and highlights
- Super Bowl champion (2013); Grey Cup champion (2019)

Career NFL statistics
- Total tackles: 7
- Stats at Pro Football Reference
- Stats at CFL.ca

Chandler Fenner (born July 6, 1990) is an American former professional football player who was a defensive back in the National Football League (NFL) and Canadian Football League (CFL). He was signed by the Kansas City Chiefs as an undrafted free agent in 2012. He played college football for the Holy Cross Crusaders.

== Early life ==
Fenner attended and played football at Frank W. Cox High School. He was a member of the high school track and field team.

== Professional career ==
On April 30, 2012, Fenner signed with the Kansas City Chiefs as an undrafted free agent. On August 31, 2012, Fenner was released by the Chiefs.

On December 7, 2012, Fenner was signed to the Seattle Seahawks to join the practice squad. On July 29, 2014, the Seahawks released Fenner.

On August 1, 2014, Fenner was signed to the New York Giants. The Giants signed him from to the active roster from their practice squad on October 3, 2014. On September 5, 2015, he was waived by the Giants.

Originally released after training camp on June 18, 2016, Fenner was re-signed by the BC Lions on July 24, 2016, to the practice roster. He was promoted to the active roster and first played for the Lions in their Week 12 match against the Montreal Alouettes.

On February 13, 2018, Fenner was signed to the Winnipeg Blue Bombers.
