= Dewayne Cherrington =

American football player (born 1990)

No. 65
- Position: Defensive tackle

Personal information
- Born: August 3, 1990 (age 36); Gwinnett County, Georgia, U.S.
- Listed height: 6 ft 3 in (1.91 m)
- Listed weight: 306 lb (139 kg)

Career information
- College: Mississippi State

Career history
- New England Patriots (2013)*; Seattle Seahawks (2013–2014)*
- * Offseason or practice squad member only

Awards and highlights
- Super Bowl champion (XLVIII)
- Stats at Pro Football Reference

Dewayne Cherrington (born August 3, 1990) is an American former professional football defensive tackle. He played college football for Mississippi State Bulldogs. Cherrington earned a Super Bowl ring as a member of the Seattle Seahawks in Super Bowl XLVIII. In the game, the Seahawks defeated the Denver Broncos by a score of 43–8.
