= 2015 New York Giants season =

91st season in franchise history

- Owner: John Mara; Steve Tisch
- General manager: Jerry Reese
- Head coach: Tom Coughlin
- Home stadium: MetLife Stadium

Results
- Record: 6–10
- Division place: 3rd NFC East
- Playoffs: Did not qualify
- All-Pros: WR Odell Beckham Jr. (2nd team)
- Pro Bowlers: WR Odell Beckham Jr. QB Eli Manning; CB Dominique Rodgers-Cromartie; K Josh Brown

Uniform
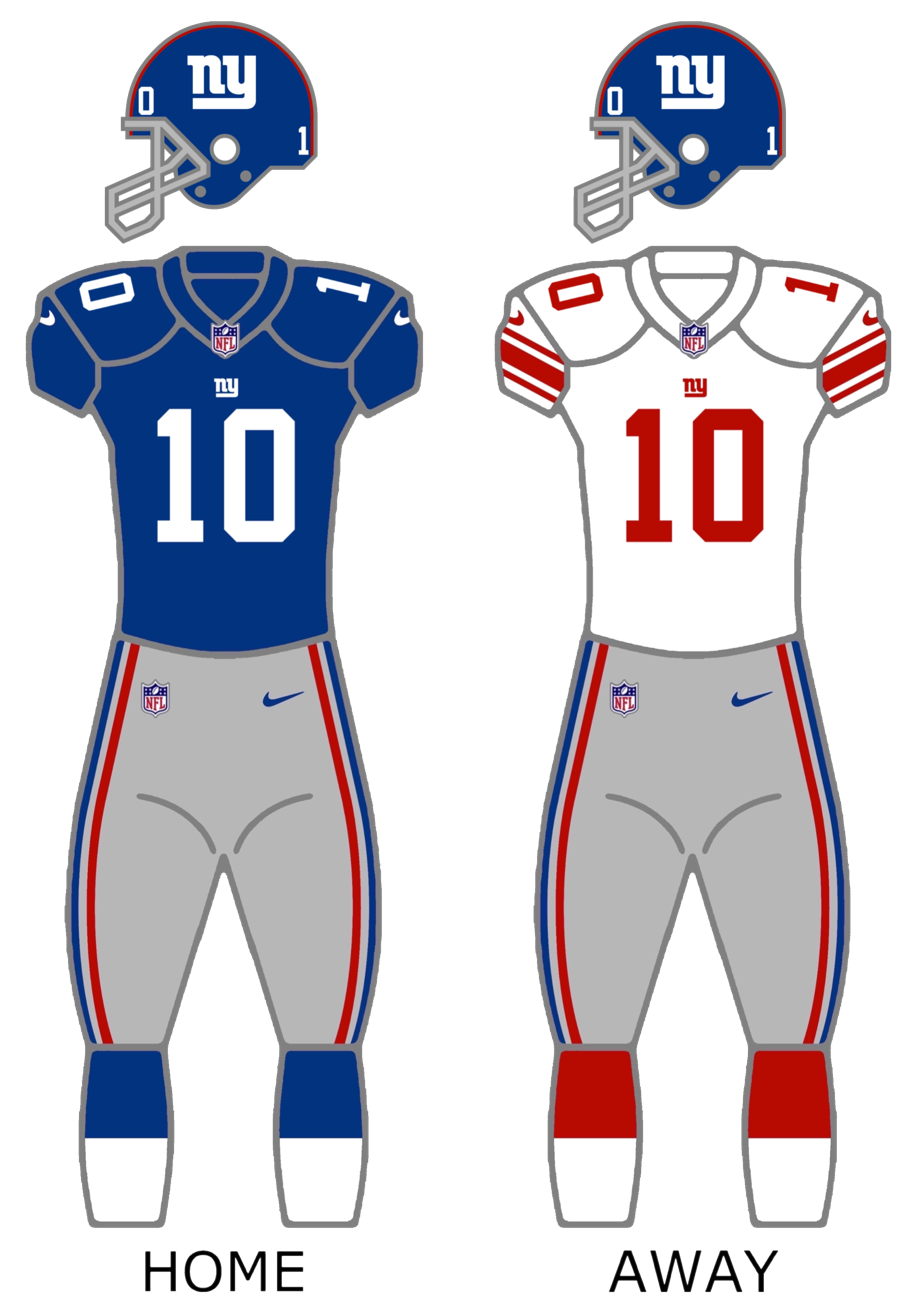

The 2015 season was the New York Giants' 91st in the National Football League (NFL) and their sixth playing home games at MetLife Stadium in East Rutherford, New Jersey. Tom Coughlin returned for his 12th and final season as the team's head coach. The Giants attempted to secure a playoff berth for the first time since their 2011 season, which concluded with their victory in Super Bowl XLVI. To honor the late Frank Gifford and Ann Mara, both of whom died earlier in 2015, the Giants added a number 16 decal on their helmets and special patch for Gifford and Mara respectively.

The Giants began the season 0–2 for the third straight year, and in doing so became the first team in NFL history to go 0–2 while holding double-digit leads in the fourth quarter of both games; however, they rebounded to win their next three games before losing to the Philadelphia Eagles. The Giants' 2015 season was plagued by their poor defense and inability to close out games, as eight of their ten losses were by a touchdown or less, and they lost six games in which they held leads or were tied within the final two minutes. These losses included their opening game against the Dallas Cowboys, their home opener against the Atlanta Falcons, a road loss to the New Orleans Saints, and two home defeats against the New England Patriots and the New York Jets. Had the Giants won these games, they would have finished 11–5 and won the NFC East. After the Washington Redskins defeated the Eagles on December 26 the Redskins clinched the NFC East division, eliminating the Giants from playoff contention for the fourth consecutive season. At the end of the season, Tom Coughlin resigned as head coach, after having made the playoffs five times and won two Super Bowls, both times against the New England Patriots.

== Offseason ==
=== Free agents signed ===
Date	Position	Player	Free agent tag	2014 Team	Notes
February 11	C	Brett Jones	FA	Calgary Stampeders (CFL)	
February 17	WR	Kevin Ogletree	UFA	New York Giants	Released May 7, 2015
February 19	C	Dallas Reynolds	RFA	New York Giants	
March 3	DE	Jason Pierre-Paul	FT	New York Giants	Has not signed franchise tag
March 4	TE	Larry Donnell	ERFA	New York Giants	
March 4	CB	Chandler Fenner	ERFA	New York Giants	Waived September 5, 2015
March 11	RB	Chris Ogbonnaya	UFA	New York Giants	Released May 11, 2015
March 11	FB	Henry Hynoski	UFA	New York Giants	Released September 5, 2015
March 11	OLB	Mark Herzlich	UFA	New York Giants	
March 13	RB	Shane Vereen	UFA	New England Patriots	
March 13	WR/KR	Dwayne Harris	UFA	Dallas Cowboys	
March 13	OT	Marshall Newhouse	UFA	Cincinnati Bengals	
March 13	OLB	Jonathan Casillas	UFA	New England Patriots	
March 13	OLB	J.T. Thomas	UFA	Jacksonville Jaguars	
March 16	OG	John Jerry	UFA	New York Giants	
March 16	CB	Chykie Brown	UFA	New York Giants	Released September 5, 2015
March 18	DT	Kenrick Ellis	UFA	New York Jets	Released September 6, 2015
March 19	TE	Daniel Fells	UFA	New York Giants	
March 20	DE	George Selvie	UFA	Dallas Cowboys	
April 15	CB/FS	Josh Gordy	UFA	Indianapolis Colts	
April 15	ILB	Ryan Jones	FA	Baltimore Ravens	Waived June 6
July 15	S	Jeromy Miles	FA	Baltimore Ravens	Released September 5, 2015
July 31	WR	James Jones	FA	Oakland Raiders	Released September 5, 2015
August 2	WR	Derrick Johnson	FA	New England Patriots	Released September 1, 2015
August 16	SS	Brandon Meriweather	FA	Washington Redskins	
August 19	DT	Jimmy Staten	FA	Seattle Seahawks	Released September 1, 2015
August 24	OLB	Ashlee Palmer	FA	Detroit Lions	Released September 5, 2015

Notable Arrival/Resigning

Released prior to resigning

=== Cuts ===
Date	Position	Player	Notes
February 11	RB	David Wilson	
February 24	DE	Mathias Kiwanuka	
February 25	RB	Peyton Hillis	
March 3	C	J. D. Walton	
March 11	CB	Travis Howard	
March 11	OT	Rogers Gaines	
April 15	DE	Paul Hazel	
April 15	CB	Josh Victorian	
April 27	RB	Michael Cox	
May 7	MLB	Terrell Manning	
May 11	CB	Thomas Gordon	
May 11	OLB	James Davidson	
July 15	WR	Marcus Harris	
July 31	OT	Troy Kropog	
August 7	WR	Chris Harper	
August 16	K	Chris Boswell	

=== Free agents lost ===
Date	Position	Player	Free agent tag	2015 Team	Notes
March 11	CB	Walter Thurmond III	UFA	Philadelphia Eagles	
March 12	SS	Antrel Rolle	UFA	Chicago Bears	
March 19	OT	James Brewer	UFA	New York Jets	
April 2	OLB	Spencer Paysinger	UFA	Miami Dolphins	
April 13	CB	Zack Bowman	UFA	Miami Dolphins	
April 29	FS	Stevie Brown	UFA		Cut by the Houston Texans on August 28, 2015
August 19	FS	Quintin Demps	UFA	Houston Texans	Played with Texans from 2010-2012

Notable Departure

=== Unsigned ===
Position	Player	Free agent tag	Notes
OG	Adam Snyder	UFA	
DT	Mike Patterson	UFA	
OLB	Jacquian Williams	UFA	
WR	Jerrel Jernigan	UFA	

=== Trades ===
Date	Acquired	From	Given	Notes
August 26, 2014	2015 seventh-round pick (No. 245)	Denver Broncos	Kicker Brandon McManus	Traded to Titans
May 1, 2015	2015 second-round pick (No. 33)	Tennessee Titans	2015 second, fourth, and seventh-round picks (No. 40, 108, 245)	Used to select Landon Collins

=== 2015 NFL draft ===
2015 New York Giants draft
Round	Pick	Player	Position	College	Notes
1	9	Ereck Flowers	Offensive tackle	Miami	
2	33	Landon Collins *	Safety	Alabama	From Tennessee Titans
3	74	Owamagbe Odighizuwa	Defensive end	UCLA	
5	144	Mykkele Thompson	Safety	Texas	
6	186	Geremy Davis	Wide receiver	UConn	
7	226	Bobby Hart	Offensive tackle	FSU	
Made roster † Pro Football Hall of Fame * Made at least one Pro Bowl during career

Notes

- The Giants acquired an additional seventh-round selection (No. 245 overall) in a trade that sent placekicker Brandon McManus to the Denver Broncos.
- The Giants traded picks No. 108 and No. 245 to receive No. 33 from the Tennessee Titans.

=== Undrafted free agent signings ===
Date	Position	Player	College	Notes
May 7	OT	Sean Donnelly	Tulane University	
May 7	SS	Justin Currie	Western Michigan University	Waived July 15, Resigned July 23, Waived August 24
May 7	OLB	Cole Farrand	University of Maryland	
May 7	RB	Akeem Hunt	Purdue University	
May 7	DE	Brad Harrah	University of Cincinnati	Waived August 1
May 7	TE	Matt LaCosse	University of Illinois	Waived August 1
May 11	TE	Will Tye	Stony Brook University	
May 11	DT	Carlif Taylor	Southern Connecticut State University	
May 11	RB	Kenneth Harper	Temple University	
May 11	WR	Ben Edwards	University of Richmond	Waived July 31
June 11	LB	Tony Johnson	Louisiana Tech University	Waived August 24
August 2	DE	Brad Bars	Pennsylvania State University	
August 7	FS	Justin Halley	Florida International University	
August 24	FS	C.J. Conway	Montclair State University	

Made final 53-man roster

=== Offseason activities ===
The New York Giants started offseason activities with a rookie minicamp starting on May 9. Organized team activities ran from May 27–29, June 1–2, June 4, June 8–9, June 11–12. Mandatory mini-camp was held June 16–18.

==== Injuries ====
- May 20: During a lifting session, Will Beatty suffered a torn pectoral injury. Beatty will undergo surgery, sidelining him for 5–6 months.
- July 4: When setting off fireworks, Jason Pierre-Paul blasted off his index finger, part of his thumb and middle finger. He has returned.

== Staff ==
=== Staff changes ===
Date	Coach	Transaction	Notes
January 7	Perry Fewell (defensive coordinator)	Fired	
January 7	Peter Giunta (secondary/cornerbacks)	Fired	
January 15	Steve Spagnuolo (defensive coordinator)	Hired	
January 15	Tim Walton (secondary/cornerbacks)	Hired	
March 12	Tom Coughlin (head coach)	Extension	Thru 2016

The Giants' most notable staff change involves their defensive coordinator position. Following the 2014 season the team fired Perry Fewell after five seasons. To replace him the Giants brought back Steve Spagnuolo, who had been the team's coordinator for the 2007 and 2008 seasons and who was most recently the secondary coach for the Baltimore Ravens.

=== Final staff ===
2015 New York Giants staff
Front office: President/CEO – John Mara; Chairman/executive vice president – Steve Tisch; Senior vice president/general manager – Jerry Reese; Senior vice president of player personnel – Chris Mara; Vice president of player evaluation – Marc Ross; Assistant general manager – Kevin Abrams; Director of pro personnel – Ken Sternfeld; Director of player development – David Tyree; Director of football operations – Matt Harriss; Head coaches: Head coach – Tom Coughlin; Offensive coaches: Offensive coordinator – Ben McAdoo; Quarterbacks – Mike Sullivan; Running backs – Craig Johnson; Wide receivers – Sean Ryan; Tight ends – Kevin Gilbride Jr.; Offensive line – Pat Flaherty; Assistant offensive line – Lunda Wells; Offensive assistant – Ryan Roeder	Defensive coaches: Defensive coordinator – Steve Spagnuolo; Defensive line – Robert Nunn; Linebackers – Jim Herrmann; Secondary/cornerbacks – Tim Walton; Secondary/safeties – David Merritt; Defensive assistant – Rob Leonard; Special teams coaches: Special teams coordinator – Tom Quinn; Assistant special teams – Larry Izzo; Strength and conditioning: Strength and conditioning – Jerry Palmieri; Assistant strength and conditioning – Markus Paul; Strength and conditioning assistant – Joe Danos

== Final roster ==
2015 New York Giants roster
Quarterbacks (QB): 10 Eli Manning; 12 Ryan Nassib; Running backs (RB): 26 Orleans Darkwa; 23 Rashad Jennings; 34 Shane Vereen; 44 Andre Williams; Wide receivers (WR): 13 Odell Beckham Jr.; 18 Geremy Davis; 83 Ben Edwards; 17 Dwayne Harris RS; 88 Hakeem Nicks; 82 Rueben Randle; 19 Myles White; Tight ends (TE): 86 Jerome Cunningham; 81 Matt LaCosse; 45 Will Tye	Offensive linemen (OL): 63 Emmett Cleary T; 76 Ereck Flowers T; 60 Adam Gettis G; 68 Bobby Hart T; 77 John Jerry G; 73 Marshall Newhouse T; 67 Justin Pugh G/T; 61 Dallas Reynolds C/G; 70 Weston Richburg C; Defensive linemen (DL): 91 Robert Ayers DE; 66 Brad Bars DE; 96 Jay Bromley DT; 98 Barry Cofield DT; 79 Montori Hughes DT; 99 Cullen Jenkins DT/DE; 71 Stansly Maponga DE; 90 Jason Pierre-Paul DE; 93 George Selvie DE; 72 Kerry Wynn DE	Linebackers (LB): 53 Jasper Brinkley MLB; 54 Jonathan Casillas OLB; 94 Mark Herzlich OLB; 48 Nico Johnson OLB; 47 Uani 'Unga MLB; Defensive backs (DB): 20 Prince Amukamara CB; 21 Landon Collins FS; 43 Craig Dahl SS; 28 Jayron Hosley CB; 25 Tramain Jacobs CB; 38 Trumaine McBride CB; 22 Brandon Meriweather SS; 41 Dominique Rodgers-Cromartie CB; 30 Cooper Taylor FS; 31 Trevin Wade CB; Special teams (ST): 3 Josh Brown K; 69 Tyler Ott LS; 9 Brad Wing P	Practice squad: 39 Glenn Carson OLB; 35 T. J. Heath CB; 15 Tavarres King WR; 2 G. J. Kinne QB; 64 Shane McDermott C; 37 Leon McFadden CB; 97 Louis Nix DT; 62 Jake Rodgers T; 89 Julian Talley WR; Reserve: 57 Danny Aiken LS (IR); 52 Jon Beason MLB (IR); 65 Will Beatty T (PUP); 29 Nat Berhe FS (IR); 80 Victor Cruz WR (IR); 36 Justin Currie SS (IR); 51 Zak DeOssie LS (IR); 84 Larry Donnell TE (IR); 85 Daniel Fells TE (IR); 95 Johnathan Hankins DT (IR); 18 Marcus Harris WR (IR); 24 Bennett Jackson FS (IR); 69 Brett Jones C (IR); 59 Devon Kennard OLB (IR); 78 Markus Kuhn DT (IR); 46 James Morris OLB (IR); 75 Brandon Mosley G/T (IR); 58 Owa Odighizuwa DE (IR/DFR); 74 Geoff Schwartz G (IR); 55 J. T. Thomas OLB (IR); 27 Mykkele Thompson FS (IR); 49 Nikita Whitlock FB (IR); Rookies in italics 53 active, 22 reserve, 9 practice squad

== Schedule ==
=== Preseason ===
Week	Date	Opponent	Result	Record	Venue	Recap
1	August 14	at Cincinnati Bengals	**L** 10–23	0–1	Paul Brown Stadium	Recap
2	August 22	Jacksonville Jaguars	**W** 22–12	1–1	MetLife Stadium	Recap
3	August 29	New York Jets	**L** 18–28	1–2	MetLife Stadium	Recap
4	September 3	at New England Patriots	**W** 12–9	2–2	Gillette Stadium	Recap

=== Regular season ===
Week	Date	Opponent	Result	Record	Venue	Recap
1	September 13	at **Dallas Cowboys**	**L** 26–27	0–1	AT&T Stadium	Recap
2	September 20	Atlanta Falcons	**L** 20–24	0–2	MetLife Stadium	Recap
3	September 24	**Washington Redskins**	**W** 32–21	1–2	MetLife Stadium	Recap
4	October 4	at Buffalo Bills	**W** 24–10	2–2	Ralph Wilson Stadium	Recap
5	October 11	San Francisco 49ers	**W** 30–27	3–2	MetLife Stadium	Recap
6	October 19	at **Philadelphia Eagles**	**L** 7–27	3–3	Lincoln Financial Field	Recap
7	October 25	**Dallas Cowboys**	**W** 27–20	4–3	MetLife Stadium	Recap
8	November 1	at New Orleans Saints	**L** 49–52	4–4	Mercedes-Benz Superdome	Recap
9	November 8	at Tampa Bay Buccaneers	**W** 32–18	5–4	Raymond James Stadium	Recap
10	November 15	New England Patriots	**L** 26–27	5–5	MetLife Stadium	Recap
11	Bye					
12	November 29	at **Washington Redskins**	**L** 14–20	5–6	FedExField	Recap
13	December 6	New York Jets	**L** 20–23 (OT)	5–7	MetLife Stadium	Recap
14	December 14	at Miami Dolphins	**W** 31–24	6–7	Sun Life Stadium	Recap
15	December 20	Carolina Panthers	**L** 35–38	6–8	MetLife Stadium	Recap
16	December 27	at Minnesota Vikings	**L** 17–49	6–9	TCF Bank Stadium	Recap
17	January 3	**Philadelphia Eagles**	**L** 30–35	6–10	MetLife Stadium	Recap

Note: Intra-division opponents are in bold text.

=== Game summaries ===
==== Week 1: at Dallas Cowboys ====
Week One: New York Giants at Dallas Cowboys – Game summary

Quarter	1	2	3	4	Total
Giants	3	10	3	10	**26**
**Cowboys**	3	3	7	14	**27**

at AT&T Stadium, Arlington, Texas

- Date: September 13
- Game time: 8:30 p.m. EDT/7:30 p.m. CDT
- Game weather: Played indoors (retractable roof closed)
- Game attendance: 93,579
- Referee: Bill Vinovich
- TV announcers (NBC): Al Michaels, Cris Collinsworth and Michele Tafoya
- Recap, Gamebook

Game information

**First quarter**

- DAL – Dan Bailey 21-yard field goal, 4:33. Cowboys 3–0. **Drive: 17 plays, 79 yards, 10:27.**
- NYG – Josh Brown 50-yard field goal, 1:58. Tied 3–3. **Drive: 8 plays, 48 yards, 2:35.**

**Second quarter**

- DAL – Dan Bailey 32-yard field goal, 5:31. Cowboys 6–3. **Drive: 9 plays, 49 yards, 5:22.**
- NYG – Dominique Rodgers-Cromartie 57-yard defensive fumble return (Josh Brown kick), 0:56. Giants 10–6.
- NYG – Josh Brown 40-yard field goal, 0:14. Giants 13–6. **Drive: 6 plays, 14 yards, 0:32.**

**Third quarter**

- NYG – Josh Brown 30-yard field goal, 9:48. Giants 16–6. **Drive: 12 plays, 68 yards, 5:12.**
- DAL – Gavin Escobar 2-yard pass from Tony Romo (Dan Bailey kick), 4:01. Giants 16–13. **Drive: 9 plays, 80 yards, 5:47.**

**Fourth quarter**

- NYG – Rashad Jennings 1-yard run (Josh Brown kick), 8:01. Giants 23–13. **Drive: 1 play, 1 yard, 0:08.**
- DAL – Jason Witten 1-yard pass from Tony Romo (Dan Bailey kick), 5:08. Giants 23–20. **Drive: 6 plays, 76 yards, 2:53.**
- NYG – Josh Brown 19-yard field goal, 1:34. Giants 26–20. **Drive: 13 plays, 79 yards, 3:34.**
- DAL – Jason Witten 11-yard pass from Tony Romo (Dan Bailey kick), 0:07. Cowboys 27–26. **Drive: 6 plays, 72 yards, 1:27.**

**Top passers**

- NYG – Eli Manning – 20/36, 189 yards
- DAL – Tony Romo – 36/45, 356 yards, 3 TD, 2 INT

**Top rushers**

- NYG – Rashad Jennings – 13 rushes, 52 yards, TD
- DAL – Joseph Randle – 16 rushes, 65 yards

**Top receivers**

- NYG – Shane Vereen – 4 receptions, 45 yards
- DAL – Lance Dunbar – 8 receptions, 70 yards

**Top tacklers**

- NYG – Uani 'Unga – 10 tackles, 2 assists, INT
- DAL – Sean Lee – 7 tackles, 2 assists, TFL

Towards the end of the game, the Cowboys did not have any timeouts, and the Giants were facing 3rd and goal from the Cowboys 1-yard line with 1:43 remaining. However, instead of just kneeing the ball and letting the clock run out, the Giants decided to throw the ball instead. Eli Manning's pass was thrown away, and the clock stopped. Josh Brown would kick a 19-yard field goal to give the Giants a 26-20 lead. The Cowboys marched down the field and got into Giants territory. The drive concluded when Tony Romo threw the game-winning touchdown pass to Jason Witten with 7 seconds left to give the Cowboys the win. Following the game, the Giants were met with heavy criticism from their fans and the media for the throwing play earlier, with most of the criticism being aimed at head coach Tom Coughlin, who later admitted that it was his fault and that the strategy for the game was wrong at the end.

With the loss, the Giants started 0-1.

==== Week 2: vs. Atlanta Falcons ====
Week Two: Atlanta Falcons at New York Giants – Game summary

Quarter	1	2	3	4	Total
**Falcons**	7	3	0	14	**24**
Giants	0	13	7	0	**20**

at MetLife Stadium, East Rutherford, New Jersey

- Date: September 20
- Game time: 1:00 p.m. EDT
- Game weather: 74 °F (23 °C), sunny
- Game attendance: 77,678
- Referee: Brad Allen
- TV announcers (Fox): Kevin Burkhardt, John Lynch and Pam Oliver
- Preview, Gamebook

Game information

**First quarter**

- ATL – Tevin Coleman 1–yard run (Matt Bryant kick), 0:34. Falcons 7-0. **Drive: 13 plays, 86 yards, 4:19.**

**Second quarter**

- NYG – Josh Brown 38–yard field goal, 10:06. Falcons 7–3. **Drive: 10 plays, 45 yards, 5:28.**
- ATL – Matt Bryant 42–yard field goal, 4:46. Falcons 10-3. **Drive: 11 plays, 56 yards, 5:20.**
- NYG – Odell Beckham Jr. 67–yard pass from Eli Manning (Josh Brown kick), 3:19. Tied 10-10. **Drive: 4 plays, 80 yards, 1:27.**
- NYG – Josh Brown 44–yard field goal, 0:02. Giants 13–10. **Drive: 6 plays, 30 yards, 0:56.**

**Third quarter**

- NYG – Larry Donnell 10–yard pass from Eli Manning (Josh Brown kick), 10:53. Giants 20–10. **Drive: 9 plays, 69 yards, 4:07.**

**Fourth quarter**

- ATL – Leonard Hankerson 10–yard pass from Matt Ryan (Matt Bryant kick), 12:39. Giants 20–17. **Drive: 12 plays, 91 yards, 6:36.**
- ATL – Devonta Freeman 2–yard run (Matt Bryant kick), 1:14. Falcons 24–20. **Drive: 7 plays, 70 yards, 1:58.**

**Top passers**

- ATL – Matt Ryan – 30/46, 363 yards, TD
- NYG – Eli Manning – 27/40, 292 yards, 2 TD

**Top rushers**

- ATL – Tevin Coleman – 9 rushes, 32 yards, TD
- NYG – Andre Williams – 6 rushes, 43 yards

**Top receivers**

- ATL – Julio Jones – 13 receptions, 135 yards
- NYG – Odell Beckham Jr. – 7 receptions, 146 yards, TD

**Top tacklers**

- ATL – Justin Durant – 9 tackles, assist, TFL
- NYG – Devon Kennard – 7 tackles, 2 assists

For the second time in two weeks, the Giants blew a fourth quarter lead inside of 2 minutes. The Falcons went down the field to score with 1:14 remaining after Devonta Freeman ran in for a 1-yard touchdown. The Giants tried to go down the field, but the drive failed, and the Giants lost 24-20.

With the loss, the Giants fell to 0-2.

==== Week 3: vs. Washington Redskins ====
Week Three: Washington Redskins at New York Giants – Game summary

Quarter	1	2	3	4	Total
Redskins	0	6	0	15	**21**
**Giants**	12	3	3	14	**32**

at MetLife Stadium, East Rutherford, New Jersey

- Date: September 24
- Game time: 8:25 p.m. EDT
- Game weather: 71 °F (22 °C), clear
- Game attendance: 76,081
- Referee: Ron Torbert
- TV announcers (CBS/NFLN): Jim Nantz, Phil Simms and Tracy Wolfson
- Recap, Gamebook

Game information

**First quarter**

- NYG – Safety, Rashad Jennings blocked punt out of end zone, 12:47. Giants 2–0.
- NYG – Andre Williams 1–yard run (Josh Brown kick), 6:34. Giants 9–0. **Drive: 4 plays, 14 yards, 1:56.**
- NYG – Josh Brown 35–yard field goal, 0:39. Giants 12–0. **Drive: 8 plays, 47 yards, 3:45.**

**Second quarter**

- WAS – Dustin Hopkins 44–yard field goal, 11:31. Giants 12–3. **Drive: 10 plays, 54 yards, 4:08.**
- NYG – Josh Brown 36–yard field goal, 7:32. Giants 15–3. **Drive: 9 plays, 47 yards, 3:59.**
- WAS – Dustin Hopkins 37–yard field goal, 1:43. Giants 15–6. **Drive: 13 plays, 61 yards, 5:49.**

**Third quarter**

- NYG – Josh Brown 48–yard field goal, 7:29. Giants 18–6. **Drive: 15 plays, 50 yards, 7:31.**

**Fourth quarter**

- NYG – Odell Beckham Jr. 30–yard pass from Eli Manning (Josh Brown kick), 13:39. Giants 25–6. **Drive: 8 plays, 73 yards, 5:06.**
- WAS – Chris Thompson 4–yard pass from Kirk Cousins (Kirk Cousins-Jamison Crowder pass), 3:40. Giants 25–14. **Drive: 13 plays, 74 yards, 3:44.**
- NYG – Rueben Randle 41–yard pass from Eli Manning (Josh Brown kick), 3:21. Giants 32–14. **Drive: 3 plays, 41 yards, 0:19.**
- WAS – Rashad Ross 101 yard kickoff return (Dustin Hopkins kick), 3:08. Giants 32–21. **Drive: 0 plays, 0 yards, 0:13.**

**Top passers**

- WAS – Kirk Cousins – 30/49, 316 yards, TD, 2 INT
- NYG – Eli Manning – 23/32, 279 yards, 2 TD

**Top rushers**

- WAS – Matt Jones – 11 rushes, 38 yards
- NYG – Rashad Jennings – 11 rushes, 32 yards

**Top receivers**

- WAS – Jordan Reed – 6 receptions, 96 yards
- NYG – Rueben Randle – 7 receptions, 116 yards, TD

**Top tacklers**

- WAS – Keenan Robinson – 10 tackles, 3 assists
- NYG – Uani 'Unga – 6 tackles, 3 assists, INT

The Giants finally got their first win of the season, beating the Redskins 32-21 on Thursday Night Football. The game began with the safety, making this the first game since Super Bowl XLVIII that the first score of the game was a safety.

With the win, the Giants improved to 1-2. This would be their last win on Thursday Night Football until 2025

==== Week 4: at Buffalo Bills ====
Week Four: New York Giants at Buffalo Bills – Game summary

Quarter	1	2	3	4	Total
**Giants**	9	7	0	8	**24**
Bills	3	0	0	7	**10**

at Ralph Wilson Stadium, Orchard Park, New York

- Date: October 4
- Game time: 1:00 p.m. EDT
- Game weather: 60 °F (16 °C), mostly cloudy
- Game attendance: 70,677
- Referee: John Hussey
- TV announcers (Fox): Kenny Albert, Daryl Johnston and Laura Okmin
- Recap, Gamebook

Game information

**First quarter**

- NYG – Josh Brown 47–yard field goal, 10:20. Giants 3–0. **Drive: 8 plays, 35 yards, 3:11.**
- BUF – Dan Carpenter 51–yard field goal, 4:33. Tied 3–3. **Drive: 5 plays, 15 yards, 1:21.**
- NYG – Dwayne Harris 21–yard pass from Eli Manning (Josh Brown kick failed), 0:25. Giants 9–3. **Drive: 2 plays, 32 yards, 0:37.**

**Second quarter**

- NYG – Rueben Randle 11–yard pass from Eli Manning (Josh Brown kick), 10:42. Giants 16–3. **Drive: 10 plays, 76 yards, 4:02.**

**Third quarter**

- No scoring plays

**Fourth quarter**

- BUF – Karlos Williams 23–yard pass from Tyrod Taylor (Dan Carpenter kick), 9:41. Giants 16–10. **Drive: 3 plays, 43 yards, 0:54.**
- NYG – Rashad Jennings 51–yard pass from Eli Manning (Andre Williams run), 7:42. Giants 24–10. **Drive: 5 plays, 72 yards, 1:59.**

**Top passers**

- NYG – Eli Manning – 20/35, 212 yards, 3 TD, INT
- BUF – Tyrod Taylor – 28/42, 274 yards, TD, INT

**Top rushers**

- NYG – Rashad Jennings – 9 rushes, 38 yards
- BUF – Karlos Williams – 18 rushes, 40 yards

**Top receivers**

- NYG – Rashad Jennings – 2 receptions, 54 yards, TD
- BUF – Charles Clay – 9 receptions, 111 yards

**Top tacklers**

- NYG – Kerry Wynn – 7 tackles, assist, 2 TFL
- BUF – Corey Graham – 8 tackles, 5 assists, sack

Prior to the season, Bills head coach Rex Ryan expressed that he wanted his team to be last in the league in penalties (the Bills had led the league in penalties in 2014). In that respect, this game was notably embarrassing for the Bills as they committed an outrageous 17 penalties for 135 yards. Five of them were either personal fouls or unsportsmanlike conduct, and two of them negated Bills touchdowns.

==== Week 5: vs. San Francisco 49ers ====
Week Five: San Francisco 49ers at New York Giants – Game summary

Quarter	1	2	3	4	Total
49ers	3	3	7	14	**27**
**Giants**	3	10	7	10	**30**

at MetLife Stadium, East Rutherford, New Jersey

- Date: October 11
- Game time: 8:30 p.m. EDT
- Game weather: 61 °F (16 °C), clear
- Game attendance: 78,515
- Referee: Walt Coleman
- TV announcers (NBC): Al Michaels, Cris Collinsworth and Michele Tafoya
- Recap, Gamebook

Game information

**First quarter**

- SF – Phil Dawson 43–yard field goal, 11:19. 49ers 3–0. **Drive: 8 plays, 55 yards, 3:41.**
- NYG – Josh Brown 22–yard field goal, 6:22. Tied 3–3. **Drive: 9 plays, 76 yards, 4:57.**

**Second quarter**

- NYG – Shane Vereen 2–yard pass from Eli Manning (Josh Brown kick), 12:15. Giants 10–3. **Drive: 14 plays, 81 yards, 5:47.**
- NYG – Josh Brown 41–yard field goal, 3:57. Giants 13–3. **Drive: 10 plays, 43 yards, 4:05.**
- SF – Phil Dawson 22–yard field goal, 1:01. Giants 13–6. **Drive: 11 plays, 76 yards, 2:56.**

**Third quarter**

- SF – Anquan Boldin 3–yard pass from Colin Kaepernick (Phil Dawson kick), 8:00. Tied 13–13. **Drive: 10 plays, 88 yards, 4:56.**
- NYG – Odell Beckham Jr. 17–yard pass from Eli Manning (Josh Brown kick), 1:14. Giants 20–13. **Drive: 7 plays, 61 yards, 3:16.**

**Fourth quarter**

- SF – Garrett Celek 5–yard pass from Colin Kaepernick (Phil Dawson kick), 11:49. Tied 20–20. **Drive: 11 plays, 80 yards, 4:25.**
- NYG – Josh Brown 24–yard field goal, 4:29. Giants 23–20. **Drive: 14 plays, 74 yards, 7:20.**
- SF – Carlos Hyde 2–yard run (Phil Dawson kick), 1:45. 49ers 27–23. **Drive: 7 plays, 80 yards, 2:44.**
- NYG – Larry Donnell 12–yard pass from Eli Manning (Josh Brown kick), 0:21. Giants 30–27. **Drive: 8 plays, 82 yards, 1:24.**

**Top passers**

- SF – Colin Kaepernick – 23/35, 262 yards, 2 TD
- NYG – Eli Manning – 41/54, 441 yards, 3 TD, INT

**Top rushers**

- SF – Carlos Hyde – 21 rushes, 93 yards, TD
- NYG – Rashad Jennings – 11 rushes, 46 yards

**Top receivers**

- SF – Anquan Boldin – 8 receptions, 107 yards, TD
- NYG – Odell Beckham Jr. – 7 receptions, 121 yards, TD

**Top tacklers**

- SF – NaVorro Bowman – 13 tackles, 3 assists
- NYG – Uani 'Unga – 7 tackles, 2 TFL

The 49ers went down the field to score with 1:45 remaining. The game appeared over after Tramaine Brock appeared to have an interception. However, the interception was reviewed, and after review, the call was overturned, because replay concluded that the ball had hit the ground before Brock was able to control it. The next play, Kenneth Acker was called for pass interference which gave the Giants the ball on the goal line. Larry Donnell caught the game-winning touchdown with 21 seconds left to give the Giants the win.

With the win, the Giants improved to 3-2.

==== Week 6: at Philadelphia Eagles ====
Week Six: New York Giants at Philadelphia Eagles – Game summary

Quarter	1	2	3	4	Total
Giants	7	0	0	0	**7**
**Eagles**	7	10	7	3	**27**

at Lincoln Financial Field, Philadelphia, Pennsylvania

- Date: October 19
- Game time: 8:30 p.m. EDT
- Game weather: 44 °F (7 °C), clear
- Game attendance: 69,296
- Referee: Carl Cheffers
- TV announcers (ESPN): Mike Tirico, Jon Gruden and Lisa Salters
- Recap, Gamebook

Game information

**First quarter**

- NYG – Odell Beckham Jr. 13–yard pass from Eli Manning (Josh Brown kick), 10:23. Giants 7–0. **Drive: 8 plays, 80 yards, 4:37.**
- PHI – Riley Cooper 32–yard pass from Sam Bradford (Caleb Sturgis kick), 3:33. Tied 7–7. **Drive: 7 plays, 78 yards, 1:45.**

**Second quarter**

- PHI – Nolan Carroll 17–yard interception return (Caleb Sturgis kick), 12:26. Eagles 14–7.
- PHI – Caleb Sturgis 37–yard field goal, 0:03. Eagles 17–7. **Drive: 8 plays, 47 yards, 1:09.**

**Third quarter**

- PHI – DeMarco Murray 12–yard run (Caleb Sturgis kick), 6:13. Eagles 24–7. **Drive: 11 plays, 85 yards, 4:36.**

**Fourth quarter**

- PHI – Caleb Sturgis 39–yard field goal, 8:19. Eagles 27–7. **Drive: 10 plays, 40 yards, 5:16.**

**Top passers**

- NYG – Eli Manning – 24/38, 189 yards, TD, 2 INT
- PHI – Sam Bradford – 24/38, 280 yards, TD, 3 INT

**Top rushers**

- NYG – Rashad Jennings – 13 rushes, 63 yards
- PHI – DeMarco Murray – 22 rushes, 109 yards, TD

**Top receivers**

- NYG – Odell Beckham Jr. – 7 receptions, 61 yards, TD
- PHI – Riley Cooper – 3 receptions, 76 yards, TD

**Top tacklers**

- NYG – Uani 'Unga – 6 tackles, assist, FF
- PHI – Jordan Hicks – 10 tackles, TFL

The Giants led 7-0 after they scored first on their opening drive. However, the Eagles outscored them 27-0 the rest of the way.

With the loss, the Giants dropped to 3-3.

==== Week 7: vs. Dallas Cowboys ====
Week Seven: Dallas Cowboys at New York Giants – Game summary

Quarter	1	2	3	4	Total
Cowboys	3	10	0	7	**20**
**Giants**	0	10	10	7	**27**

at MetLife Stadium, East Rutherford, New Jersey

- Date: October 25
- Game time: 4:25 p.m. EDT
- Game weather: 71 °F (22 °C), mostly cloudy
- Game attendance: 80,319
- Referee: John Parry
- TV announcers (Fox): Joe Buck, Troy Aikman and Erin Andrews
- Recap, Gamebook

Game information

**First quarter**

- DAL – Dan Bailey 30-yard field goal, 5:25. Cowboys 3–0. **Drive: 11 plays, 68 yards, 5:17.**

**Second quarter**

- NYG – Orleans Darkwa 15-yard run (Josh Brown kick), 11:02. Giants 7–3. **Drive: 7 plays, 79 yards, 3:05.**
- DAL – Dan Bailey 48-yard field goal, 7:29. Giants 7–6. **Drive: 6 plays, 30 yards, 3:33.**
- DAL – Darren McFadden 1-yard run (Dan Bailey kick), 2:17. Cowboys 13–7. **Drive: 6 plays, 72 yards, 3:19.**
- NYG – Josh Brown 47-yard field goal, 1:04. Cowboys 13–10. **Drive: 8 plays, 51 yards, 1:13.**

**Third quarter**

- NYG – Dominique Rodgers-Cromartie 58-yard interception return (Josh Brown kick), 11:19. Giants 17–13.
- NYG – Josh Brown 34-yard field goal, 3:18. Giants 20–13. **Drive: 8 plays, 83 yards, 4:25.**

**Fourth quarter**

- DAL – Devin Street 25-yard pass from Matt Cassel (Dan Bailey kick), 7:14. Tied 20–20. **Drive: 9 plays, 80 yards, 4:58.**
- NYG – Dwayne Harris 100-yard kickoff return (Josh Brown kick), 7:01. Giants 27-20. **Drive: 0 plays, 0 yards, 0:13.**

**Top passers**

- DAL – Matt Cassel – 17/27, 227 yards, TD, 3 INT
- NYG – Eli Manning – 13/24, 170 yards

**Top rushers**

- DAL – Darren McFadden – 29 rushes, 152 yards, TD
- NYG – Shane Vereen – 4 rushes, 56 yards

**Top receivers**

- DAL – Jason Witten – 6 receptions, 73 yards
- NYG – Rueben Randle – 2 receptions, 68 yards

**Top tacklers**

- DAL – Sean Lee – 9 tackles, 6 assists
- NYG – Jon Beason – 11 tackles, 4 assists

The Giants ended a five-game losing streak to the Cowboys dating to October 28, 2012 at AT&T Stadium, doing so despite only 289 aggregate yards of offense. Two touchdowns were scored by either defense or special teams, first on a Matt Cassel pick-six run back 58 yards by Dominique Rodgers-Cromartie in the third quarter; in the fourth following a game-tying Cassel score to Devin Street the ensuing kickoff was run back 100 yards by Dwayne Harris. The game earned additional notoriety; in response to the presence on the Cowboys roster of Greg Hardy with domestic violence controversy surrounding him the Giants invited actress and outspoken advocate of domestic-violence victims Mariska Hargitay along with her husband Peter Hermann and their son August Miklos Hermann to be honorary captains; Hargitay and Hermann wore Mark Herzlich jerseys while August wore a jersey of Odell Beckham Jr.

With the win, Tom Coughlin became the second head coach in the Giants history to win 100 regular season games, the first since Steve Owen accomplished the feat in 1944. This was also Coughlin's last home win as Giants head coach.

==== Week 8: at New Orleans Saints ====
Week Eight: New York Giants at New Orleans Saints – Game summary

Quarter	1	2	3	4	Total
Giants	7	14	7	21	**49**
**Saints**	14	14	14	10	**52**

at Mercedes-Benz Superdome, New Orleans, Louisiana

- Date: November 1
- Game time: 1:00 p.m. EST/12:00 p.m. CST
- Game weather: Played indoors (dome stadium)
- Game attendance: 73,019
- Referee: Craig Wrolstad
- TV announcers (Fox): Kenny Albert, Daryl Johnston and Laura Okmin
- Recap, Gamebook

Game information

**First quarter**

- NYG – Odell Beckham Jr. 2–yard pass from Eli Manning (Josh Brown kick), 9:39. Giants 7–0. **Drive: 10 plays, 60 yards, 4:01.**
- NO – Willie Snead 34–yard pass from Drew Brees (Kai Forbath kick), 7:36. Tied 7–7. **Drive: 6 plays, 80 yards, 2:03.**
- NO – Brandin Cooks 26–yard pass from Drew Brees (Kai Forbath kick), 2:24. Saints 14–7. **Drive: 5 plays, 96 yards, 3:03.**

**Second quarter**

- NYG – Odell Beckham Jr. 1 yard pass from Eli Manning (Josh Brown kick), 13:31. Tied 14–14. **Drive: 9 plays, 79 yards, 3:53.**
- NO – Marques Colston 53–yard pass from Drew Brees (Kai Forbath kick), 11:05. Saints 21–14. **Drive: 5 plays, 80 yards, 2:26.**
- NO – Willie Snead 2–yard pass from Drew Brees (Kai Forbath kick), 1:46. Saints 28–14. **Drive: 14 plays, 60 yards, 7:07.**
- NYG – Shane Vereen 2–yard pass from Eli Manning (Josh Brown kick), 0:02. Saints 28–21. **Drive: 10 plays, 80 yards, 1:44.**

**Third quarter**

- NYG – Odell Beckham Jr. 50–yard pass from Eli Manning (Josh Brown kick), 12:58. Tied 28–28. **Drive: 4 plays, 65 yards, 2:02.**
- NO – Brandin Cooks 21–yard pass from Drew Brees (Kai Forbath kick), 10:09. Saints 35–28. **Drive: 8 plays, 80 yards, 2:49.**
- NO – Ben Watson 20–yard pass from Drew Brees (Kai Forbath kick), 0:29. Saints 42–28. **Drive: 9 plays, 80 yards, 3:46.**

**Fourth quarter**

- NYG – Dwayne Harris 9–yard pass from Eli Manning (Josh Brown kick), 12:15. Saints 42–35. **Drive: 11 plays, 80 yards, 3:14.**
- NYG – Dwayne Harris 20–yard pass from Eli Manning (Josh Brown kick), 9:30. Tied 42–42. **Drive: 3 plays, 65 yards, 1:01.**
- NYG – Trumaine McBride 63–yard interception return (Josh Brown kick), 7:11. Giants 49–42.
- NO – C. J. Spiller 9–yard pass from Drew Brees (Kai Forbath kick), 0:36. Tied 49–49. **Drive: 14 plays, 80 yards, 6:35.**
- NO – Kai Forbath 50–yard field goal, 0:00. Saints 52–49. **Drive: 1 play, 0 yards, 0:05.**

**Top passers**

- NYG – Eli Manning – 30/41, 350 yards, 6 TD
- NO – Drew Brees – 39/50, 505 yards, 7 TD, 2 INT

**Top rushers**

- NYG – Rashad Jennings – 10 rushes, 54 yards
- NO – Mark Ingram II – 16 rushes, 80 yards

**Top receivers**

- NYG – Odell Beckham Jr. – 8 receptions, 130 yards, 3 TD
- NO – Benjamin Watson – 9 receptions, 147 yards, TD

**Top tacklers**

- NYG – Landon Collins – 9 tackles, 4 assists
- NO – Stephone Anthony – 11 tackles, 5 assists

Eli Manning's six touchdown passes, with three of them to Odell Beckham Jr. were not enough as a late field goal by the Saints sealed the 52-49 victory in a battle of passing offenses. The game lead tied or changed ten times and Manning's six scores and 350 yards were bettered by Drew Brees with 505 yards and seven touchdowns, all overcoming two interceptions.

The 101 combined points scored are tied for the fourth most in NFL history.

==== Week 9: at Tampa Bay Buccaneers ====
Week Nine: New York Giants at Tampa Bay Buccaneers – Game summary

Quarter	1	2	3	4	Total
**Giants**	10	7	3	12	**32**
Buccaneers	6	3	3	6	**18**

at Raymond James Stadium, Tampa, Florida

- Date: November 8
- Game time: 4:05 p.m. EST
- Game weather: 80 °F (27 °C), cloudy
- Game attendance: 64,351
- Referee: Clete Blakeman
- TV announcers (Fox): Kenny Albert, Daryl Johnston and Laura Okmin
- Recap, Gamebook

Game information

**First quarter**

- TB – Connor Barth 25–yard field goal, 13:26. Buccaneers 3–0. **Drive: 4 plays, 6 yards, 1:25.**
- NYG – Josh Brown 35–yard field goal, 9:52. Tied 3–3. **Drive: 10 plays, 63 yards, 3:34.**
- TB – Connor Barth 28–yard field goal, 8:04. Buccaneers 6–3. **Drive: 5 plays, 70 yards, 1:48.**
- NYG – Rueben Randle 8–yard pass from Eli Manning (Josh Brown kick), 0:53. Giants 10–6. **Drive: 12 plays, 80 yards, 7:11.**

**Second quarter**

- NYG – Shane Vereen 4–yard pass from Eli Manning (Josh Brown kick), 11:20. Giants 17–6. **Drive: 9 plays, 28 yards, 3:34.**
- TB – Connor Barth 21–yard field goal, 0:06. Giants 17–9. **Drive: 7 plays, 62 yards, 2:56.**

**Third quarter**

- NYG – Josh Brown 35–yard field goal, 11:49. Giants 20–9. **Drive: 4 plays, 7 yards, 0:43.**
- TB – Connor Barth 53–yard field goal, 7:15. Giants 20–12. **Drive: 10 plays, 49 yards, 4:34.**

**Fourth quarter**

- TB – Jameis Winston 10–yard run (pass failed), 9:25. Giants 20–18. **Drive: 5 plays, 87 yards, 2:11.**
- NYG – Josh Brown 53–yard field goal, 7:18. Giants 23–18. **Drive: 6 plays, 42 yards, 2:07.**
- NYG – Josh Brown 44–yard field goal, 0:23. Giants 26–18. **Drive: 10 plays, 52 yards, 4:34.**
- NYG – Trevin Wade 5–yard defensive fumble return (run failed), 0:00. Giants 32–18.

**Top passers**

- NYG – Eli Manning – 26/40, 213 yards, 2 TD, 2 INT
- TB – Jameis Winston – 19/36, 247 yards

**Top rushers**

- NYG – Rashad Jennings – 13 rushes, 48 yards
- TB – Charles Sims – 8 rushes, 78 yards

**Top receivers**

- NYG – Odell Beckham Jr. – 9 receptions, 105 yards
- TB – Mike Evans – 8 receptions, 150 yards

**Top tacklers**

- NYG – Jasper Brinkley – 7 tackles, 2 assists
- TB – Lavonte David – 11 tackles, 5 assists

Jason Pierre-Paul, who suffered an off-season fireworks incident on July 4, made his season debut as the Giants defeated the Buccaneers 32-18.

==== Week 10: vs. New England Patriots ====
Week Ten: New England Patriots at New York Giants – Game summary

Quarter	1	2	3	4	Total
**Patriots**	7	3	7	10	**27**
Giants	7	10	6	3	**26**

at MetLife Stadium, East Rutherford, New Jersey

- Date: November 15
- Game time: 4:25 p.m. EST
- Game weather: 60 °F (16 °C), clear
- Game attendance: 81,061
- Referee: Ed Hochuli
- TV announcers (CBS): Jim Nantz, Phil Simms and Tracy Wolfson
- Recap, Gamebook

Game information

**First quarter**

- NE – Scott Chandler 1–yard pass from Tom Brady (Stephen Gostkowski kick), 6:40. Patriots 7–0. **Drive: 14 plays, 80 yards, 8:20.**
- NYG – Odell Beckham Jr. 87–yard pass from Eli Manning (Josh Brown kick), 5:49. Tied 7–7. **Drive: 2 plays, 91 yards, 0:51.**

**Second quarter**

- NE – Stephen Gostkowski 31–yard field goal, 12:54. Patriots 10–7. **Drive: 10 plays, 57 yards, 5:28.**
- NYG – Josh Brown 37–yard field goal, 3:42. Tied 10–10. **Drive: 9 plays, 35 yards, 3:17.**
- NYG – Dwayne Harris 1–yard pass from Eli Manning (Josh Brown kick), 0:13. Giants 17–10. **Drive: 7 plays, 74 yards, 0:56.**

**Third quarter**

- NYG – Josh Brown 38–yard field goal, 9:32. Giants 20–10. **Drive: 10 plays, 60 yards, 5:28.**
- NE – LeGarrette Blount 1–yard run (Stephen Gostkowski kick), 4:46. Giants 20–17. **Drive: 3 plays, 7 yards, 1:23.**
- NYG – Josh Brown 53–yard field goal, 0:49. Giants 23–17. **Drive: 9 plays, 45 yards, 3:57.**

**Fourth quarter**

- NE – Rob Gronkowski 76–yard pass from Tom Brady (Stephen Gostkowski kick), 11:33. Patriots 24–23. **Drive: 3 plays, 86 yards, 1:25.**
- NYG – Josh Brown 29–yard field goal, 1:47. Giants 26–24. **Drive: 15 plays, 86 yards, 4:14.**
- NE – Stephen Gostkowski 54–yard field goal, 0:01. Patriots 27–26. **Drive: 12 plays, 44 yards, 1:46.**

**Top passers**

- NE – Tom Brady – 26/42, 334 yards, 2 TD, INT
- NYG – Eli Manning – 24/44, 361 yards, 2 TD

**Top rushers**

- NE – LeGarrette Blount – 19 rushes, 66 yards, TD
- NYG – Rashad Jennings – 11 rushes, 39 yards

**Top receivers**

- NE – Rob Gronkowski – 5 receptions, 113 yards, TD
- NYG – Odell Beckham Jr. – 4 receptions, 104 yards, TD

**Top tacklers**

- NE – Patrick Chung – 12 tackles, 6 assists
- NYG – Jasper Brinkley – 12 tackles, 3 assists, TFL

Meeting for the first time since Super Bowl XLVI, the Giants hosted the undefeated Patriots. Commissioner Roger Goodell was in attendance. The Giants looked to stop the streaking Patriots in a game where both teams saw touchdowns wiped out on penalties. The Giants trailed by 2 at the two-minute warning, and on second down Eli Manning tossed a pass in the end zone to Odell Beckham Jr. Beckham appeared to have the catch, but as he brought the ball up in celebration, it was knocked out by Malcolm Butler in a play eerily similar to a drop by Lee Evans in the closing seconds of the 2011 AFC Championship Game. Manning scrambled for a loss on third down, and Josh Brown kicked the go-ahead field goal to give New York a lead. However, a last second game-winning field goal by the Patriots kicker Stephen Gostkowski ended the Giants' hopes. Although he was cleared to play, Victor Cruz, a day later, announced he would not play this season as he underwent surgery to repair an injured left calf.

==== Week 12: at Washington Redskins ====
Week Twelve: New York Giants at Washington Redskins – Game summary

Quarter	1	2	3	4	Total
Giants	0	0	0	14	**14**
**Redskins**	0	17	0	3	**20**

at FedExField, Landover, Maryland

- Date: November 29
- Game time: 1:00 p.m. EST
- Game weather: 46 °F (8 °C), cloudy
- Game attendance: 77,367
- Referee: Carl Cheffers
- TV announcers (Fox): Kenny Albert, Daryl Johnston and Laura Okmin
- Recap, Gamebook

Game information

**First quarter**

- No scoring plays

**Second quarter**

- WAS – Dustin Hopkins 41–yard field goal, 12:23. Redskins 3–0. **Drive: 12 plays, 56 yards, 7:01.**
- WAS – DeSean Jackson 63–yard pass from Kirk Cousins (Dustin Hopkins kick), 10:18. Redskins 10–0. **Drive: 1 play, 63 yards, 0:11.**
- WAS – Kirk Cousins 1–yard run (Dustin Hopkins kick), 1:45. Redskins 17–0. **Drive: 9 plays, 80 yards, 3:55.**

**Third quarter**

- No scoring plays

**Fourth quarter**

- WAS – Dustin Hopkins 33–yard field goal, 11:36. Redskins 20–0. **Drive: 9 plays, 35 yards, 4:58.**
- NYG – Rueben Randle 40–yard pass from Eli Manning (Josh Brown kick), 10:10. Redskins 20–7. **Drive: 6 plays, 80 yards, 1:26.**
- NYG – Odell Beckham Jr. 21–yard pass from Eli Manning (Josh Brown kick), 4:57. Redskins 20–14. **Drive: 9 plays, 77 yards, 2:23.**

**Top passers**

- NYG – Eli Manning – 26/51, 321 yards, 2 TD, 3 INT
- WAS – Kirk Cousins – 20/29, 302 yards, TD

**Top rushers**

- NYG – Shane Vereen – 2 rushes, 15 yards
- WAS – Alfred Morris – 23 rushes, 78 yards

**Top receivers**

- NYG – Odell Beckham Jr. – 9 receptions, 142 yards, TD
- WAS – Jordan Reed – 8 receptions, 98 yards

**Top tacklers**

- NYG – Devon Kennard – 10 tackles, 5 assists
- WAS – Will Compton – 10 tackles, 6 assists

Odell Beckham Jr. made a tremendous catch during this game, as he made another one-handed catch for a touchdown. However, the catch was not enough, as the Giants trailed 20-0 and could not come back.

With the loss, the Giants fell to 5-6.

==== Week 13: vs. New York Jets ====
Week Thirteen: New York Jets at New York Giants – Game summary

Quarter	1	2	3	4	OT	Total
**Jets**	3	7	0	10	3	**23**
Giants	0	20	0	0	0	**20**

at MetLife Stadium, East Rutherford, New Jersey

- Date: December 6
- Game time: 1:00 p.m. EST
- Game weather: 51 °F (11 °C), sunny
- Game attendance: 80,898
- Referee: John Hussey
- TV announcers (CBS): Ian Eagle, Dan Fouts and Evan Washburn
- Recap, Gamebook

Game information

**First quarter**

- NYJ – Randy Bullock 24-yard field goal, 5:47. Jets 3–0. **Drive: 11 plays, 78 yards, 6:33.**

**Second quarter**

- NYG – Dwayne Harris 80-yard punt return (Josh Brown kick), 14:39. Giants 7–3.
- NYG – Josh Brown 20-yard field goal, 8:58. Giants 10–3. **Drive: 4 plays, 8 yards, 1:58.**
- NYJ – Bilal Powell 25-yard pass from Ryan Fitzpatrick (Randy Bullock kick), 3:21. Tied 10–10. **Drive: 9 plays, 79 yards, 5:37.**
- NYG – Odell Beckham Jr. 72-yard pass from Eli Manning (Josh Brown kick), 2:13. Giants 17–10. **Drive: 3 plays, 80 yards, 1:08.**
- NYG – Josh Brown 35-yard field goal, 0:30. Giants 20–10. **Drive: 6 plays, 50 yards, 1:12.**

**Third quarter**

- No scoring plays.

**Fourth quarter**

- NYJ – Randy Bullock 24-yard field goal, 4:24. Giants 20–13. **Drive: 12 plays, 80 yards, 4:18.**
- NYJ – Brandon Marshall 9-yard pass from Ryan Fitzpatrick (Randy Bullock kick), 0:27. Tied 20–20. **Drive: 10 plays, 71 yards, 2:13.**

**Overtime**

- NYJ – Randy Bullock 31-yard field goal, 8:45. Jets 23–20. **Drive: 13 plays, 61 yards, 6:15.**

**Top passers**

- NYJ – Ryan Fitzpatrick – 36/50, 390 yards, 2 TD
- NYG – Eli Manning – 18/34, 297 yards, TD, INT

**Top rushers**

- NYJ – Chris Ivory – 10 rushes, 47 yards
- NYG – Orleans Darkwa – 8 rushes, 23 yards

**Top receivers**

- NYJ – Brandon Marshall – 12 receptions, 131 yards, TD
- NYG – Odell Beckham Jr. – 6 receptions, 149 yards, TD

**Top tacklers**

- NYJ – David Harris – 9 tackles, 5 assists
- NYG – Landon Collins – 8 tackles, assist

The Giants would lead 20-10 in the fourth quarter. However, the Jets would march down the field to tie the game with 27 seconds remaining. Randy Bullock would give the Jets the lead in overtime after he converted a 31-yard field goal. The Giants would go down the field, but a critical drop by Odell Beckham Jr. would prove them costly. Josh Brown would miss a 48-yard field goal during overtime, giving the Jets the win. This game was the 5th this season that the Giants have lost when leading with 2 minutes or less in the 4th quarter, with 3 of them coming at home.

With the loss, the Giants fell to 5-7.

==== Week 14: at Miami Dolphins ====
Week Fourteen: New York Giants at Miami Dolphins – Game summary

Quarter	1	2	3	4	Total
**Giants**	3	14	7	7	**31**
Dolphins	7	10	7	0	**24**

at Sun Life Stadium, Miami Gardens, Florida

- Date: December 14
- Game time: 8:30 p.m. EST
- Game weather: 77 °F (25 °C), clear
- Game attendance: 65,408
- Referee: Craig Wrolstad
- TV announcers (ESPN): Mike Tirico, Jon Gruden and Lisa Salters
- Recap, Gamebook

Game information

**First quarter**

- NYG - Josh Brown 35-yard field goal, 11:09. Giants 3–0. **Drive: 6 plays, 19 yards, 2:36.**
- MIA - Lamar Miller 14-yard run (Andrew Franks kick), 5:41. Dolphins 7–3. **Drive: 11 plays, 74 yards, 5:28.**

**Second quarter**

- NYG - Rueben Randle 6-yard pass from Eli Manning (Josh Brown kick), 13:00. Giants 10–7. **Drive: 9 plays, 70 yards, 3:27.**
- MIA - Lamar Miller 38-yard run (Andrew Franks kick), 10:10. Dolphins 14–10. **Drive: 7 plays, 67 yards, 2:50.**
- MIA - Andrew Franks 36-yard field goal, 1:52. Dolphins 17–10. **Drive: 4 plays, 7 yards, 1:05.**
- NYG - Will Tye 5-yard pass from Eli Manning (Josh Brown kick), 0:44. Tied 17–17. **Drive: 4 plays, 80 yards, 1:08.**

**Third quarter**

- MIA - Kenny Stills 47-yard pass from Ryan Tannehill (Andrew Franks kick), 9:37. Dolphins 24–17. **Drive: 6 plays, 61 yards, 3:15.**
- NYG - Odell Beckham Jr. 6-yard pass from Eli Manning (Josh Brown kick), 5:01. Tied 24–24. **Drive: 8 plays, 80 yards, 4:36.**

**Fourth quarter**

- NYG - Odell Beckham Jr. 84-yard pass from Eli Manning (Josh Brown kick), 11:13. Giants 31–24. **Drive: 2 plays, 96 yards, 0:45.**

**Top passers**

- NYG – Eli Manning - 27/31, 337 yards, 4 TD
- MIA – Ryan Tannehill - 25/41, 236 yards, TD

**Top rushers**

- NYG – Rashad Jennings - 22 carries, 81 yards
- MIA – Lamar Miller - 12 carries, 89 yards, 2 TD

**Top receivers**

- NYG – Odell Beckham Jr. - 7 receptions, 166 yards, 2 TD
- MIA – Jarvis Landry - 11 receptions, 99 yards

**Top tacklers**

- NYG – Landon Collins - 8 tackles, 2 assists
- MIA – Reshad Jones - 10 tackles, assist

It was the first Monday Night meeting between the Giants and the Dolphins.

The game was a shootout and Eli Manning was spectacular, completing 27 of 31 passes, 4 of them touchdowns in a 31-24 win.

This was Tom Coughlin's last win as the Giants head coach.

==== Week 15: vs. Carolina Panthers ====
Week Fifteen: Carolina Panthers at New York Giants – Game summary

Quarter	1	2	3	4	Total
**Panthers**	7	14	14	3	**38**
Giants	7	0	7	21	**35**

at MetLife Stadium, East Rutherford, New Jersey

- Date: December 20
- Game time: 1:00 p.m. EST
- Game weather: 41 °F (5 °C), sunny
- Game attendance: 79,436
- Referee: Terry McAulay
- TV announcers (Fox): Joe Buck, Troy Aikman and Erin Andrews
- Recap, Gamebook

Game information

**First quarter**

- CAR - Ted Ginn Jr. 3-yard pass from Cam Newton (Graham Gano kick), 5:33. Panthers 7–0. **Drive: 9 plays, 88 yards, 4:46.**
- NYG - Rueben Randle 27-yard pass from Eli Manning (Josh Brown kick), 1:24. Tied 7–7. **Drive: 10 plays, 80 yards, 4:09.**

**Second quarter**

- CAR - Greg Olsen 37-yard pass from Cam Newton (Graham Gano kick), 2:14. Panthers 14–7. **Drive: 3 plays, 46 yards, 1:16.**
- CAR - Devin Funchess 14-yard pass from Cam Newton (Graham Gano kick), 0:15. Panthers 21–7. **Drive: 9 plays, 72 yards, 1:09.**

**Third quarter**

- CAR - Corey Brown 20-yard pass from Cam Newton (Graham Gano kick), 10:03. Panthers 28–7. **Drive: 7 plays, 80 yards, 2:43.**
- CAR - Ted Ginn Jr. 14-yard pass from Cam Newton (Graham Gano kick), 5:32. Panthers 35–7. **Drive: 7 plays, 37 yards, 2:44.**
- NYG - Will Tye 8-yard pass from Eli Manning (Josh Brown kick), 1:18. Panthers 35–14. **Drive: 13 plays, 64 yards, 4:14.**

**Fourth quarter**

- NYG - Rashad Jennings 38-yard run (Josh Brown kick), 13:24. Panthers 35–21. **Drive: 4 plays, 66 yards, 1:17.**
- NYG - Shane Vereen 8-yard pass from Eli Manning (Josh Brown kick), 5:27. Panthers 35–28. **Drive: 3 plays, 14 yards, 1:16.**
- NYG - Odell Beckham Jr. 14-yard pass from Eli Manning (Josh Brown kick), 1:46. Tied 35–35. **Drive: 7 plays, 66 yards, 2:34.**
- CAR - Graham Gano 43-yard field goal, 0:00. Panthers 38–35. **Drive: 8 plays, 49 yards, 1:46.**

**Top passers**

- CAR – Cam Newton - 25/45, 340 yards, 5 TD
- NYG – Eli Manning - 29/46, 245 yards, 4 TD, INT

**Top rushers**

- CAR – Cam Newton - 8 carries, 100 yards
- NYG – Rashad Jennings - 16 carries, 107 yards, TD

**Top receivers**

- CAR – Ted Ginn Jr. - 6 receptions, 85 yards, 2 TD
- NYG – Odell Beckham Jr. - 6 receptions, 76 yards, TD

**Top tacklers**

- CAR – Luke Kuechly - 15 tackles, 5 assists
- NYG – Landon Collins - 10 tackles, 2 assists

The Giants hosted the undefeated Panthers, which gained attention for the fight between Odell Beckham Jr. and Panthers cornerback Josh Norman, which lasted for nearly the entire game. Beckham would draw three personal fouls for his involvement. The Giants managed to erase a 28-point deficit but failed to stop Cam Newton on the Panthers final drive, losing after a game-winning field goal.

==== Week 16: at Minnesota Vikings ====
Week Sixteen: New York Giants at Minnesota Vikings – Game summary

Quarter	1	2	3	4	Total
Giants	0	3	7	7	**17**
**Vikings**	3	16	13	17	**49**

at TCF Bank Stadium, Minneapolis, Minnesota

- Date: December 27
- Game time: 8:30 p.m. EST/7:30 p.m. CST
- Game weather: 13 °F (−11 °C), partly cloudy
- Game attendance: 52,455
- Referee: Tony Corrente
- TV announcers (NBC): Al Michaels, Cris Collinsworth and Michele Tafoya
- Recap, Gamebook

Game information

**First quarter**

- MIN - Blair Walsh 32-yard field goal, 0:08. Vikings 3–0. **Drive: 8 plays, 40 yards, 3:44.**

**Second quarter**

- MIN - Kyle Rudolph 28-yard pass from Teddy Bridgewater (Blair Walsh kick), 11:02. Vikings 10–0. **Drive: 5 plays, 44 yards, 2:04.**
- NYG - Josh Brown 27-yard field goal, 8:22. Vikings 10–3. **Drive: 8 plays, 71 yards, 2:40.**
- MIN - Harrison Smith 35-yard interception return (Blair Walsh kick failed), 4:00. Vikings 16–3.
- MIN - Blair Walsh 52-yard field goal, 0:04. Vikings 19–3. **Drive: 7 plays, 23 yards, 1:01.**

**Third quarter**

- MIN - Blair Walsh 22-yard field goal, 7:35. Vikings 22–3. **Drive: 9 plays, 58 yards, 5:06.**
- MIN - Adrian Peterson 2-yard run (Blair Walsh kick), 6:40. Vikings 29–3. **Drive: 2 plays, 4 yards, 0:42.**
- MIN - Blair Walsh 53-yard field goal, 1:51. Vikings 32–3. **Drive: 6 plays, 47 yards, 3:27.**
- NYG - Rueben Randle 72-yard pass from Eli Manning (Josh Brown kick), 1:02. Vikings 32–10. **Drive: 2 plays, 80 yards, 0:49.**

**Fourth quarter**

- MIN - Jerick McKinnon 7-yard run (Blair Walsh kick), 13:31. Vikings 39–10. **Drive: 6 plays, 18 yards, 2:31.**
- MIN - Blair Walsh 27-yard field goal, 9:34. Vikings 42–10. **Drive: 5 plays, 26 yards, 2:44.**
- MIN - Jerick McKinnon 68-yard run (Blair Walsh kick), 3:36. Vikings 49–10. **Drive: 3 plays, 80 yards, 1:43.**
- NYG - Myles White 25-yard pass from Ryan Nassib (Josh Brown kick), 1:54. Vikings 49–17. **Drive: 6 plays, 77 yards, 1:42.**

**Top passers**

- NYG – Eli Manning - 15/29, 234 yards, TD, 3 INT
- MIN – Teddy Bridgewater - 15/25, 168 yards, TD

**Top rushers**

- NYG – Rashad Jennings - 14 carries, 74 yards
- MIN – Adrian Peterson - 22 carries, 104 yards, TD

**Top receivers**

- NYG – Rueben Randle - 2 receptions, 80 yards, TD
- MIN – Jarius Wright - 3 receptions, 57 yards

**Top tacklers**

- NYG – Jonathan Casillas - 10 tackles, 3 assists, 2 TFL
- MIN – Chad Greenway - 9 tackles, 3 assists

The deflated Giants traveled to Minnesota to take on the Vikings. Already eliminated from the playoffs due to Washington beating Philadelphia the night before to secure the NFC East, they were without their star wide receiver Odell Beckham Jr. as he was suspended for his actions in a Week 15 loss against Carolina. The Vikings' stingy defense put pressure on Eli Manning all game, forcing Tom Coughlin to bench Manning after three interceptions. The Giants defense was not a factor as they failed to contain the Vikings rushing attack all game long. Linebacker JT Thomas was ejected from the game in the 4th quarter for throwing a punch.

The loss of Beckham was too steep to overcome and the Giants wound up losing 49-17, dropping to 6-9.

==== Week 17: vs. Philadelphia Eagles ====
Week Seventeen: Philadelphia Eagles at New York Giants – Game summary

Quarter	1	2	3	4	Total
**Eagles**	14	7	7	7	**35**
Giants	3	17	7	3	**30**

at MetLife Stadium, East Rutherford, New Jersey

- Date: January 3, 2016
- Game time: 1:00 p.m. EST
- Game weather: 45 °F (7 °C), sunny
- Game attendance: 78,023
- Referee: Gene Steratore
- TV announcers (Fox): Kenny Albert, Daryl Johnston and Laura Okmin
- Recap, Gamebook

Game information

**First quarter**

- PHI - DeMarco Murray 54-yard run (Caleb Sturgis kick), 13:10. Eagles 7–0. **Drive: 5 plays, 80 yards, 1:50.**
- NYG - Josh Brown 22-yard field goal, 4:07. Eagles 7–3. **Drive: 9 plays, 44 yards, 3:08.**
- PHI - Darren Sproles 6-yard run (Caleb Sturgis kick), 1:36. Eagles 14–3. **Drive: 6 plays, 85 yards, 2:31.**

**Second quarter**

- NYG - Josh Brown 30-yard field goal, 13:48. Eagles 14–6. **Drive: 10 plays, 68 yards, 2:48.**
- NYG - Will Tye 9-yard pass from Eli Manning (Josh Brown kick), 11:01. Eagles 14–13. **Drive: 3 plays, 35 yards, 1:13.**
- PHI - Jordan Matthews 4-yard pass from Sam Bradford (Caleb Sturgis kick), 4:28. Eagles 21–13. **Drive: 16 plays, 80 yards, 6:23.**
- NYG - Rashad Jennings 2-yard run (Josh Brown kick), 0:13. Eagles 21–20. **Drive: 13 plays, 80 yards, 4:25.**

**Third quarter**

- NYG - Rueben Randle 45-yard pass from Eli Manning (Josh Brown kick), 9:11. Giants 27–21. **Drive: 1 play, 45 yards, 0:09.**
- PHI - Walter Thurmond 83-yard defensive fumble return (Caleb Sturgis kick), 3:34. Eagles 28–27.

**Fourth quarter**

- PHI - Jordan Matthews 3-yard pass from Sam Bradford (Caleb Sturgis kick), 9:19. Eagles 35–27. **Drive: 13 plays, 91 yards, 6:12.**
- NYG - Josh Brown 48-yard field goal, 4:30. Eagles 35–30. **Drive: 12 plays, 50 yards, 4:49.**

**Top passers**

- PHI – Sam Bradford - 30/38, 320 yards, 2 TD, INT
- NYG – Eli Manning - 24/43, 302 yards, 2 TD

**Top rushers**

- PHI – DeMarco Murray - 12 carries, 69 yards, TD
- NYG – Rashad Jennings - 27 carries, 170 yards, TD

**Top receivers**

- PHI – Zach Ertz - 9 receptions, 152 yards
- NYG – Rueben Randle - 4 receptions, 79 yards, TD

**Top tacklers**

- PHI – Mychal Kendricks - 9 tackles, 4 assists
- NYG – Jasper Brinkley - 9 tackles, assist, TFL

With Odell Beckham Jr. back from his suspension, the Giants hosted the Eagles for the final game of both their seasons, which was also played on Eli Manning's 35th birthday. The Giants offense put up a fight, but a 3rd quarter fumble by Manning that was returned for a touchdown did the Giants in. The Giants attempted a comeback, but down 5 in the final minutes, Manning could not lead the Giants into the end zone. This loss dropped the Giants to 6-10 for the second straight season, and the game proved to be Tom Coughlin's final game coaching the Giants. Coughlin ended with just nine wins in 25 career games against the Eagles. This was the last time the Giants would score 30 points in a game until October 7, 2018.

== Standings ==
=== Division ===
NFC East
	W	L	T	PCT	DIV	CONF	PF	PA	STK
^{(4)} Washington Redskins	9	7	0	.563	4–2	8–4	388	379	W4
Philadelphia Eagles	7	9	0	.438	3–3	4–8	377	430	W1
New York Giants	6	10	0	.375	2–4	4–8	420	442	L3
Dallas Cowboys	4	12	0	.250	3–3	3–9	275	374	L4

=== Conference ===
NFC
#	Team	Division	W	L	T	PCT	DIV	CONF	SOS	SOV	STK
Division Leaders
1	Carolina Panthers	South	15	1	0	.938	5–1	11–1	.441	.438	W1
2	Arizona Cardinals	West	13	3	0	.813	4–2	10–2	.477	.457	L1
3	Minnesota Vikings	North	11	5	0	.688	5–1	8–4	.504	.449	W3
4	Washington Redskins	East	9	7	0	.563	4–2	8–4	.465	.403	W4
Wild Cards
5 (Note: Green Bay finished ahead of Seattle based on head-to-head victory.)	Green Bay Packers	North	10	6	0	.625	3–3	7–5	.531	.450	L2
6	Seattle Seahawks	West	10	6	0	.625	3–3	7–5	.520	.431	W1
Did not qualify for the postseason
7	Atlanta Falcons	South	8	8	0	.500	1–5	5–7	.480	.453	L1
8 (Note: St. Louis and Detroit finished ahead of Philadelphia and New Orleans based on conference record. St. Louis finished ahead of Detroit based on head-to-head victory. Detroit finished ahead of Philadelphia and New Orleans based on head-to-head sweep, while Philadelphia finished ahead of New Orleans based on head-to-head victory.)	St. Louis Rams	West	7	9	0	.438	4–2	6–6	.527	.482	L1
9	Detroit Lions	North	7	9	0	.438	3–3	6–6	.535	.429	W3
10	Philadelphia Eagles	East	7	9	0	.438	3–3	4–8	.508	.473	W1
11	New Orleans Saints	South	7	9	0	.438	3–3	5–7	.504	.402	W2
12 (Note: The New York Giants and Chicago each finished ahead of Tampa Bay based on head-to-head victory, while the Giants finished ahead of Chicago based on conference record.)	New York Giants	East	6	10	0	.375	2–4	4–8	.500	.396	L3
13	Chicago Bears	North	6	10	0	.375	1–5	3–9	.547	.469	L1
14	Tampa Bay Buccaneers	South	6	10	0	.375	3–3	5–7	.484	.406	L4
15	San Francisco 49ers	West	5	11	0	.313	1–5	4–8	.539	.463	W1
16	Dallas Cowboys	East	4	12	0	.250	3–3	3–9	.531	.438	L4
Tiebreakers (Note: When breaking ties for three or more teams under the NFL's rules, they are first broken within divisions, then comparing only the highest-ranked remaining team from each division.)
