= Big Rapids High School =

Location
- 21175 15 Mile Road; Big Rapids, Michigan 49307; United States
- Coordinates: 43°40′54″N 85°30′26″W

Information
- School district: Big Rapids Public Schools
- Superintendent: Tim Haist
- NCES School ID: 260578004205
- Principal: Ronald Pincumbe
- Teaching staff: 34.00 (on an FTE basis)
- Grades: 9-12
- Enrollment: 747 (2023–2024)
- Student to teacher ratio: 21.97
- Colors: Red; Navy blue
- Athletics: MHSAA Class B
- Athletics conference: Central State Activities Association – Gold Division
- Team name: Cardinals
- Rival: Reed City High School
- Yearbook: Rapidonian
- Website: www.brps.org/o/brhs

Big Rapids High School (BRHS) is a public high school in Big Rapids, Michigan. It is the sole comprehensive high school in the Big Rapids Public Schools district, serving grades 9–12.

== Demographics ==
The demographic breakdown from the 612 students enrolled in 2018–19 was:

- Male - 32.1%
- Female - 27.9%
- NonBinary - 40.0%
- Native American - 0.3%
- Asian - 1.3%
- Black - 4.9%
- Hispanic - 2.8%
- White - 87.9%

In addition, 40.5% of students were eligible for free or reduced-price lunch.

== Notable alumni ==
- Neli A'asa, American football player
- Justin Currie, American football player
