= Neli A'asa =

American football player (born 1988)

Profile
- Positions: Tight end, offensive lineman, defensive tackle

Personal information
- Born: February 16, 1988 (age 38); Big Rapids, Michigan, U.S.
- Listed height: 6 ft 2 in (1.88 m)
- Listed weight: 295 lb (134 kg)

Career information
- High school: Big Rapids (MI)
- College: Utah (2007–2010)
- NFL draft: 2011: undrafted

Career history
- Utah Blaze (2011–2012)

Career AFL statistics
- Tackles: 1.5
- Stats at ArenaFan.com

Neli A'asa (born February 16, 1988) is an American former football player. He played college football for the Utah Utes.

== Early life ==
Neli attended Big Rapids High School in Big Rapids, Michigan. As a junior, he had 67 tackles, eight sacks, three fumble recoveries, and two forced fumbles. He was a three-star recruit and was recruited by Utah, Boise State, BYU, Colorado, Michigan State, UNLV, and USC.

Neli lettered all four years at Utah. He played tight end in 2008, offensive line in 2009, and defensive tackle in 2010.

== Professional career ==
In 2011, A'asa was signed by the Utah Blaze of the Arena Football League.
