= Jerome Cunningham =

American football player (born 1991)

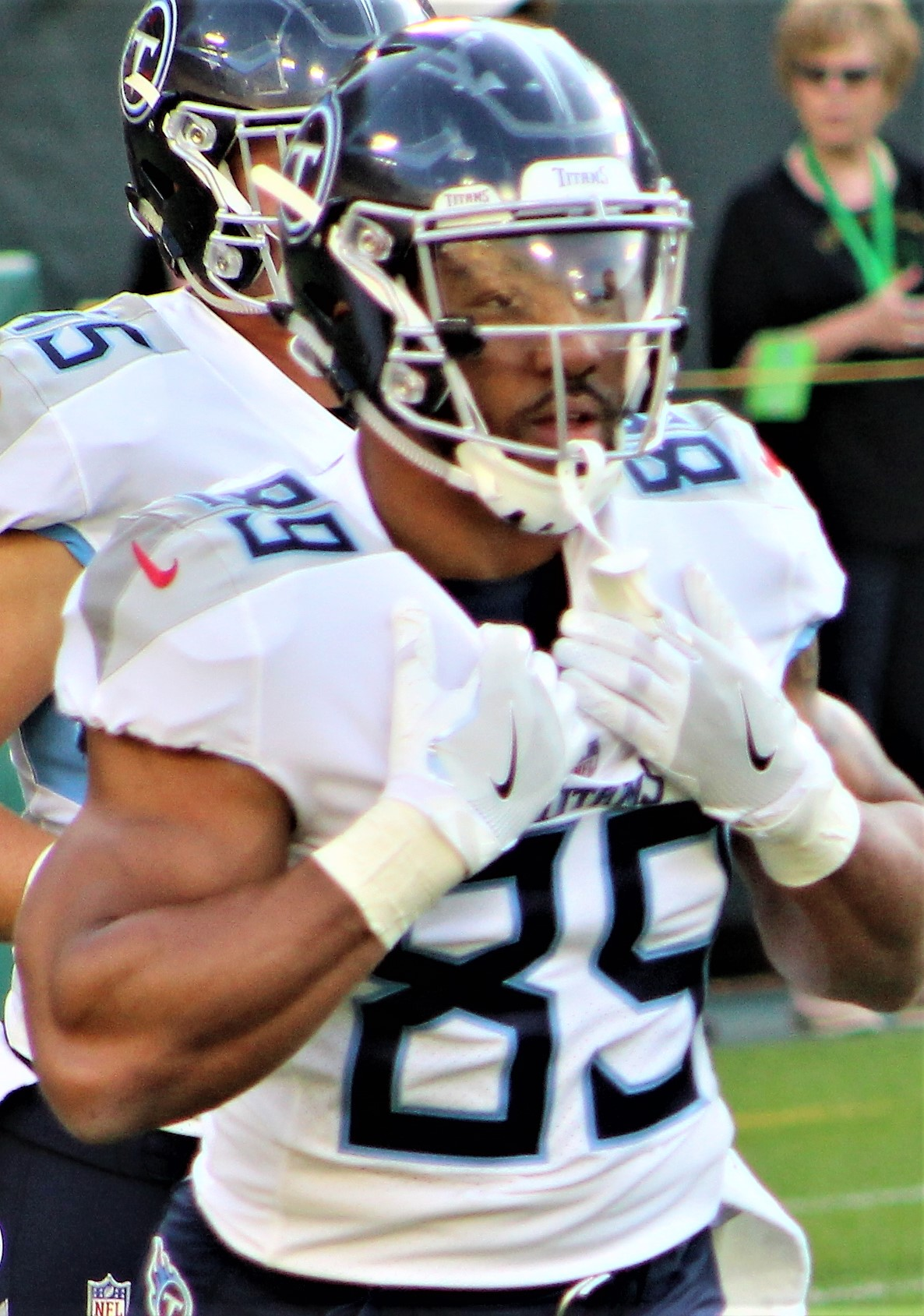
- Cunningham with the Tennessee Titans in 2018

No. 86, 83
- Position: Tight end

Personal information
- Born: May 25, 1991 (age 35); Waterbury, Connecticut, U.S.
- Listed height: 6 ft 4 in (1.93 m)
- Listed weight: 254 lb (115 kg)

Career information
- High school: Crosby (Waterbury, Connecticut)
- College: Southern Connecticut (2009–2012)
- NFL draft: 2013: undrafted

Career history
- New York Giants (2014–2015); New York Jets (2016)*; Tennessee Titans (2016–2018)*; Detroit Lions (2018); Washington Redskins (2019)
- * Offseason or practice squad member only

Career NFL statistics
- Receptions: 8
- Receiving yards: 59
- Stats at Pro Football Reference

Jerome Cunningham (born May 25, 1991) is an American former professional football player who was a tight end in the National Football League (NFL). He played college football at Southern Connecticut Owls.

== College career ==
Cunningham played tight end at Division II Southern Connecticut State University from 2009-2012. In his college career, he recorded 61 catches for 690 yards and 7 touchdowns.

== Professional career ==
After going undrafted in the 2013 NFL draft, Cunningham was invited to the Indianapolis Colts' minicamp, but he did not receive a contract offer and spent the 2013 season out of football.

=== New York Giants ===
On August 5, 2014, Cunningham was signed by the New York Giants. On August 26, 2014, he was waived. On September 3, 2014, Cunningham was added to the Giants' practice squad. Cunningham spent the first 15 weeks of the 2014 regular season on the practice squad. On December 17, 2014, Cunningham was promoted to the active roster for the last two games of the regular season.

Cunningham made the Giants' 53-man roster to begin the 2015 regular season. On October 18, 2015, he was waived by the Giants. He was re-signed to the Giants' practice squad on October 21, 2015. Cunningham was promoted to the active roster on November 5, 2015. On May 5, 2016, the Giants waived Cunningham.

=== New York Jets ===
Cunningham was claimed off waivers by the New York Jets on May 9, 2016. On May 24, 2016, he was waived.

=== Tennessee Titans ===
On May 25, 2016, Cunningham was claimed off waivers by the Tennessee Titans. On September 2, 2016, he was released by the Titans as part of final roster cuts and was signed to the practice squad the next day. He signed a reserve/future contract with the Titans on January 2, 2017.

On September 2, 2017, Cunningham was waived by the Titans and was signed to the practice squad the next day. He was released on September 12, 2017. He was re-signed to the practice squad on December 13, 2017. On December 19, 2017, he was released from the practice squad.

On August 7, 2018, Cunningham was re-signed by the Titans. He was waived on September 1, 2018 and was signed to the practice squad the next day. He was released on September 18, 2018.

=== Detroit Lions ===
On September 26, 2018, Cunningham was signed to the Detroit Lions' practice squad. On October 24, he was released and re-signed to the practice squad three days later. On October 31, he was cut again but re-signed the next day. He was promoted to the active roster on December 11, 2018.

On August 31, 2019, Cunningham was waived by the Lions.

=== Washington Redskins ===
On September 25, 2019, Cunningham was signed by the Washington Redskins. He was placed on injured reserve on October 15.

After the season, the Redskins chose not to assign a restricted free agent tender to Cunningham, and he became a free agent on March 18, 2020.
