= Landon Collins =

American football player (born 1994)

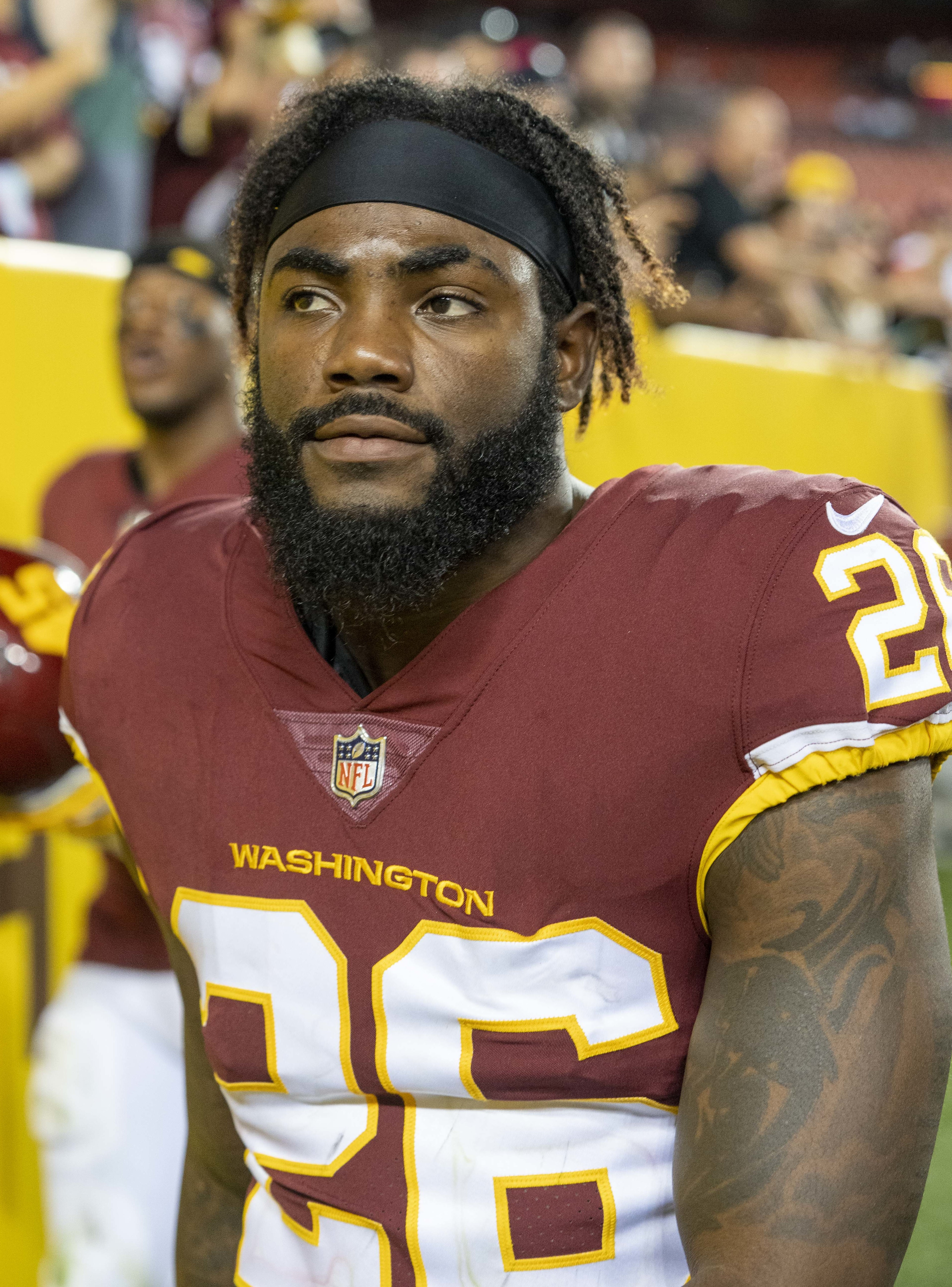
- Collins with the Washington Football Team in 2021

No. 21, 20, 26
- Positions: Safety, linebacker

Personal information
- Born: January 10, 1994 (age 32); New Orleans, Louisiana, U.S.
- Listed height: 6 ft 0 in (1.83 m)
- Listed weight: 218 lb (99 kg)

Career information
- High school: Dutchtown (Geismar, Louisiana)
- College: Alabama (2012–2014)
- NFL draft: 2015: 2nd round, 33rd overall pick

Career history
- New York Giants (2015–2018); Washington Redskins / Football Team (2019–2021); New York Giants (2022)

Awards and highlights
- First-team All-Pro (2016); 3× Pro Bowl (2016–2018); PFWA All-Rookie Team (2015); BCS national champion (2013); Unanimous All-American (2014); First-team All-SEC (2014); Second-team All-SEC (2013)

Career NFL statistics
- Total tackles: 691
- Sacks: 11
- Pass deflections: 41
- Interceptions: 12
- Forced fumbles: 7
- Fumble recoveries: 5
- Defensive touchdowns: 2
- Stats at Pro Football Reference

Landon Alexander Collins (born January 10, 1994) is an American former professional football player who was a safety and linebacker in the National Football League (NFL). He played college football for the Alabama Crimson Tide, where he was a part of the team that won the 2013 BCS National Championship Game. He was selected by the New York Giants in the second round of the 2015 NFL draft. Collins was named to the 2016 All-Pro Team and went to three Pro Bowls during his tenure with them. He has also played for the Washington Redskins from 2019 to 2021.

== Early life ==
Collins attended Dutchtown High School, in Geismar, Louisiana, where he was a two-sport star in football and track. In football, he was an All-American defensive back. As a sophomore, he had 26 tackles with 1.5 sacks, one interception and one fumble recovery, while playing alongside senior Eric Reid. Replacing Reid, Collins accounted for 102 tackles with 12 tackles for loss and four interceptions as a junior, earning an 5A All-State selection by the Louisiana Sports Writers Association. The Dutchtown Griffins went unbeaten through the regular season and entered the playoffs as the No. 1 seed, only to be upset 29–14 by No. 24 New Iberia Westgate in the Class 5A quarterfinals. The Griffins finished the season with a 12–1 record. As a senior, Collins excelled on both sides of the ball. On offense, he rushed for 1,218 yards and 21 touchdowns while averaging 13.7 yards per carry. Meanwhile, in the defensive backfield, he had 34 tackles with four interceptions, two of which he returned for touchdowns. Collins became the first player in LSWA history to earn 5A All-State honors on both sides of the ball. He led the Griffins to their second straight 10–0 regular season and District 5-5A title. However, in the opening round of the 5A playoffs, they were upset 28–14 by Ponchatoula. For his individual achievements, Collins earned All-American honors by Parade and USA Today. He also starred in the 2012 Under Armour All-America Game, recording an interception and keying a goal-line stand.

Also a standout track & field athlete, Collins was one of the state's top sprinters while at Dutchtown. At the 2011 Josten's Invitational, Collins ran the second leg on the Dutchtown 4 × 100m squad, helping lead them to victory and setting a new school record at 41.10 seconds. He won the 100-meter dash at the 2012 Episcopal 4-Way Championships, recording a personal-best time of 10.28 seconds. He also posted a career-best time of 21.60 seconds in the 200-meter dash at the 2012 Josten's Invitational, where he placed first. At the LHSAA Class 5A State Championships, Collins ran the second leg on the Dutchtown 4 × 200m squad, helping them claim the state title with a time of 1:25.40 minutes. In addition, he also ran a 4.48-second 40-yard dash and had a 36-inch vertical jump.

Regarded as a five-star recruit by both Rivals.com and Scout.com, Collins was ranked as the top safety prospect in his class and the third best player overall by 247sports.com. ESPN, in their rankings of the 2012 class' top 150 high school football players, also listed Collins as the top ranked safety, but as the sixth player overall, while Rivals.com had Collins as their second best safety and 17th best overall player. Recruited by nearly every major school, Collins narrowed his choice down to Alabama and Louisiana State. He announced his decision live at the Under Armour All-America Game, choosing the Crimson Tide. Upon choosing Alabama, Collins acknowledged that he "actually made the decision two years prior", but his mother, April Justin, was visibly displeased with her son's decision to choose the Crimson Tide over her LSU Tigers.

== College career ==
=== 2012 season ===
When Collins arrived in Tuscaloosa for his freshman season, then-defensive coordinator Kirby Smart noted that Collins was a young player struggling to adjust to the nuances of the college game. Shortly after deciding to declare for the NFL draft in January 2015, Collins recalled that as a freshman, "You're going to be lost. You don't know what's going on. You don't know the process of how everything goes." As a true freshman at Alabama, Collins contributed as a backup. He started on the kickoff and punt coverage units on and saw reserve action at safety in all 14 season games, recording 17 tackles and blocking a punt. He tied for the team lead with 10 special teams tackles, including nine on kickoff coverage and one on punt coverage. Alabama went on to win the BCS National Championship in 2012.

=== 2013 season ===
After starting safety Vinnie Sunseri tore his ACL during Alabama's 52–0 win against Arkansas, Collins took over the starting job. In his first game as a starter against Tennessee, Collins had an 89-yard interception return for a touchdown. He finished the year with 70 tackles, two interceptions, and two fumble recoveries. Collins' 70 tackles ranked 2nd among the team, only behind starting linebacker C.J. Mosley, despite only having started six games. Despite starting the season 11–0, Alabama concluded the season with an Iron Bowl loss to Auburn and an Allstate Sugar Bowl loss to Oklahoma.

=== 2014 season ===
As a junior, Collins started all fourteen games and led the team with 98 tackles, tied for the team lead in interceptions with three alongside Cyrus Jones, and finished second on the team with two fumble recoveries. He was named a unanimous All-American. The team would go on to make the first ever College Football Playoff, but eventually would lose to Ohio State in the semifinals.

After his junior season, Collins entered the 2015 NFL draft. Collins was reluctant to forgo his senior season at Alabama, but he was swayed by the NFL Draft Advisory Board's decision to grade him as a potential first-round pick. Mel Kiper Jr., of ESPN, even had him listed as a top-10 pick in one of his original mock drafts. Collins acknowledged that passing up on the opportunities to compete for another national championship and continue his education at Alabama was difficult, but vowed that he would complete the necessary courses in order to ensure that he would graduate.

== Professional career ==
=== Pre-draft ===
Prior to his junior season, Collins was projected as a high first-round selection in the 2015 NFL Draft by various mock drafts.

Pre-draft measurables
Height	Weight	Arm length	Hand span	Wingspan	40-yard dash	10-yard split	20-yard split	20-yard shuttle	Three-cone drill	Vertical jump	Broad jump	Bench press
6 ft 0 in (1.83 m)	228 lb (103 kg)	31 1/2 in (0.80 m)	9 3/8 in (0.24 m)	6 ft 6 in (1.98 m)	4.53 s	1.57 s	2.64 s	4.33 s	7.38 s	35.0 in (0.89 m)	10 ft 0 in (3.05 m)	16 reps
All values from NFL Combine

=== New York Giants (first stint) ===
==== 2015 season ====
Collins was selected in the second round (33rd overall) of the 2015 NFL Draft by the New York Giants. The Giants originally owned the 40th pick, 8th overall in the second round, but made a trade with the Tennessee Titans in order to take Collins. On June 19, 2015, Collins signed a four-year, US$6 million contract with the team.

Collins entered training camp competing with Cooper Taylor and Nat Berhe to be the New York Giants' starting free safety, after they lost veterans Quintin Demps, Antrel Rolle, and Stevie Brown to free agency in the off season. On August 14, 2015, in a preseason game against the Cincinnati Bengals, Collins suffered a sprained MCL. He missed only one preseason game. The New York Giants named him the starting free safety to begin his rookie season. Collins was switched from his natural strong safety position since he was better suited to play free safety than Brandon Meriweather.

He made his professional regular season debut in the Giants' season opener against the Dallas Cowboys and finished the 27–26 loss with four combined tackles. On October 19, 2015, Collins made his first career interception, picking off Sam Bradford and making five combined tackles in the Giant's 27–7 loss to the Philadelphia Eagles. On December 20, 2015, Collins recorded a season-high ten combined tackles and a pass deflection in a 38–35 loss to the Carolina Panthers. He finished his rookie season with 112 combined tackles, nine pass deflections, and an interception in 16 starts. He was named to the PFWA All-Rookie Team. The New York Giants finished 6–10 and head coach Tom Coughlin resigned at the end of the season.

==== 2016 season ====
Collins enjoyed a breakout year in 2016 helping the Giants to an 11–5 record and to return to the playoffs for the first time since 2011.

With the selection of Darian Thompson in the 2016 NFL draft, Collins was able to switch back to his originally intended position of strong safety. He was named the de facto starting strong safety to begin the regular season.

In the season opener against the Cowboys, Collins recorded six solo tackles and a pass deflection in his regular season debut at strong safety. The following week, he made six combined tackles and recorded his first career sack on Drew Brees in a 16–13 victory over the New Orleans Saints. On October 16, 2016, Collins racked up a season-high nine solo tackles, an assisted tackle, and sacked Joe Flacco in a 27–23 win over the Baltimore Ravens. The following week the New York Giants played the Los Angeles Rams at Twickenham Stadium in London, and he made eight solo tackles and a season-high two interceptions off of Case Keenum, returning one for a 44-yard touchdown. He was named Week 7's National Football Conference (NFC) Defensive Player of the Week.

On November 6, 2016, Collins recorded a season-high 12 combined tackles, a pass deflection, a sack, and intercepted Carson Wentz during the Giant's 28–23 win over the Philadelphia Eagles. He was named the NFC Defensive Player of the Week for the second consecutive game and was the first safety to accomplish that feat since Troy Polamalu. The following week, he recorded five solo tackles and intercepted Andy Dalton in the fourth quarter of a 21–20 victory over the Cincinnati Bengals. During a Week 11 matchup with the Chicago Bears, Collins made six solo tackles, three pass deflections, and intercepted Jay Cutler with 1:11 left on the clock to seal the 22–16 victory. This was Collins fourth consecutive game with an interception. Collins earned NFC Defensive Player of the Month for November, registering 30 combined tackles, a sack, and three interceptions.

On December 20, 2016, Collins was named to the 2017 Pro Bowl. He finished his first season under new head coach Ben McAdoo with 125 combined tackles, four sacks, 13 pass deflections, five interceptions, and a touchdown in 16 starts. Collins ended the season as the only player in NFL history to have over 100 solo tackles, more than two sacks, at least five interceptions, and with a minimum 12 pass deflections. He was also named first-team All-Pro. After the season, Collins was named NFC Defensive player of the Year by the Kansas City Committee of 101. He was also ranked 28th by his peers on the NFL Top 100 Players of 2017.

==== 2017 season ====
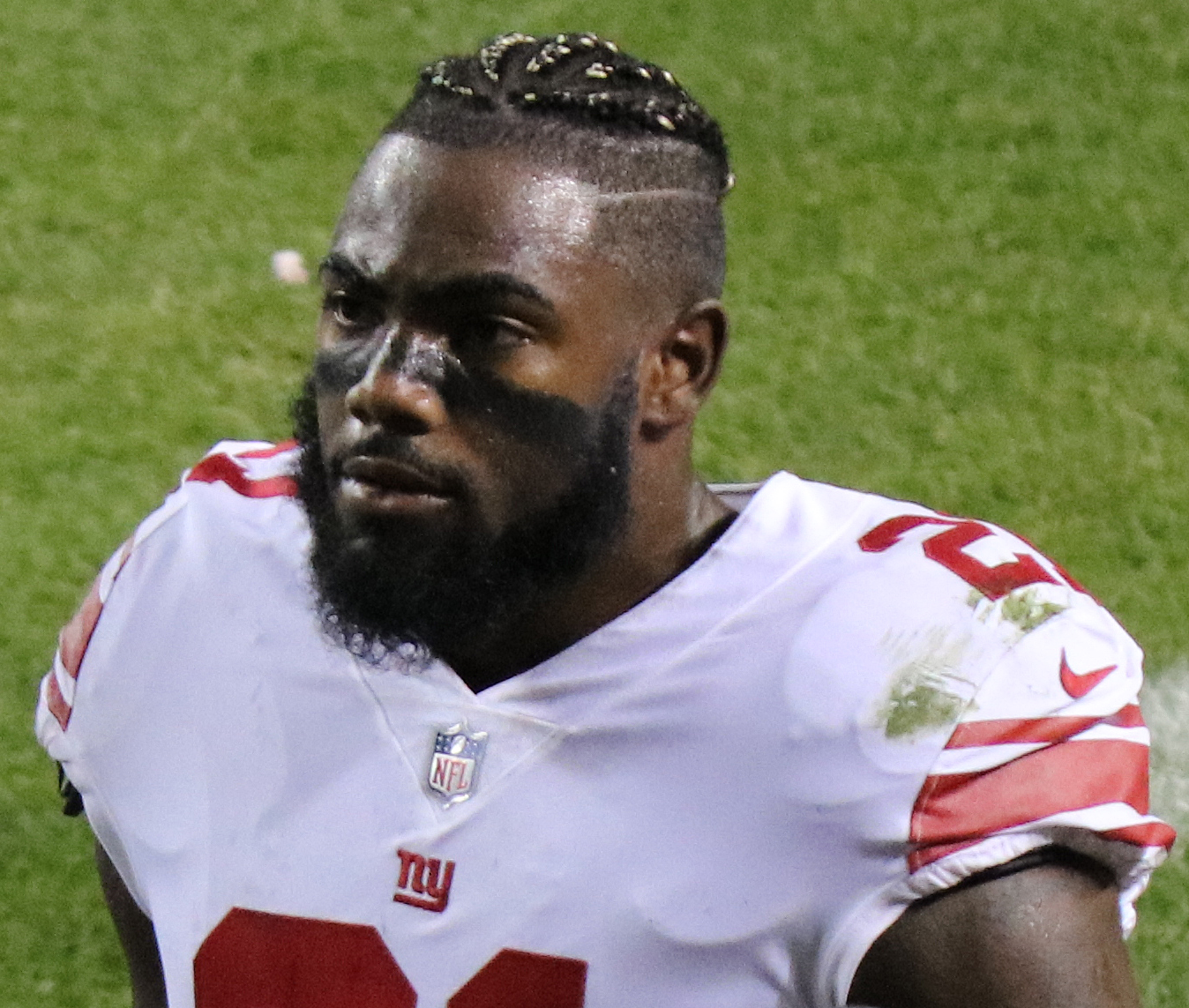
Collins playing for the Giants in 2017.

In Week 11, Collins recorded 15 tackles and had an Interception in a 12–9 overtime win over the Chiefs, earning him NFC Defensive Player of the Week. The Giants started the season 2-10 and subsequently fired head coach Ben McAdoo. Collins expressed his displeasure with this decision by saying that McAdoo deserved to coach for at least one more year. In Week 14, Collins injured his ankle in a game against the Cowboys. Collins was forced to leave the game and was unable to return. However he returned the following week in Week 16. On December 19, 2017, Collins was named to his second Pro Bowl. On December 26, 2017, Collins was placed on injured reserve after suffering a fractured forearm in Week 16. He was ranked 92nd by his peers on the NFL Top 100 Players of 2018.

==== 2018 season ====
During the offseason, Collins announced that he required surgery on his right forearm, and that he may have to miss part of the Giants training camp. Collins was part of trade rumors around the trade deadline; however, he was not moved. In the team's Week 13 win over the Chicago Bears, Collins suffered a partially torn rotator cuff and was placed on injured reserve four days later after it was announced he would have surgery to repair it. He finished the season with 96 total tackles, four pass breakups, and a forced fumble playing and starting in 12 games.

=== Washington Redskins / Football Team ===
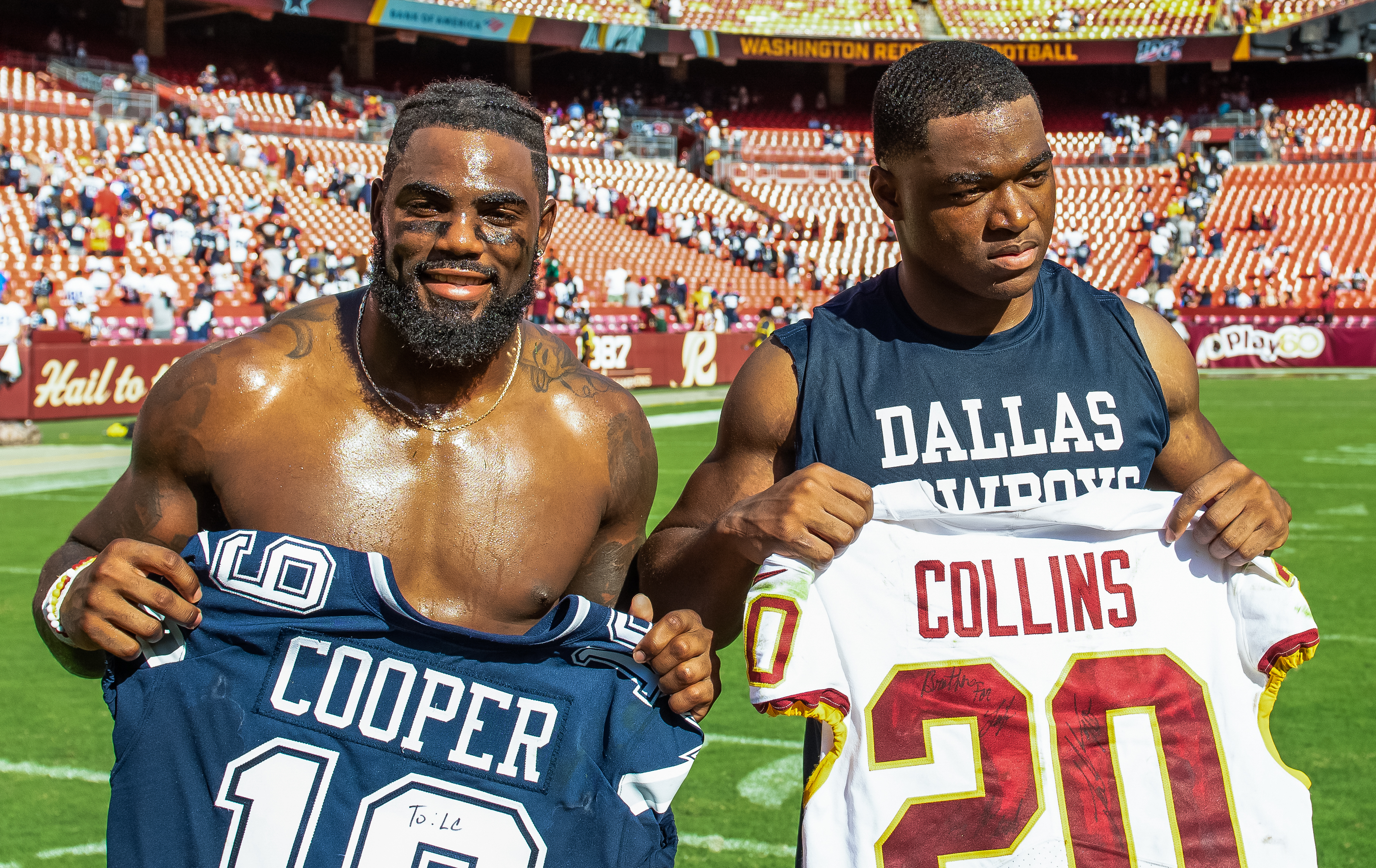
Collins alongside Amari Cooper following a game against the Dallas Cowboys in 2019.

==== 2019 season ====
An unrestricted free agent for the 2019 season, Collins signed a six-year, $84 million contract with the Washington Redskins on March 13, 2019. After initial speculation on if Collins would wear number 21 with the Redskins after his idol, Sean Taylor, Collins chose 20 as 21 has not been given out by the team since Taylor's death in 2007. In Week 2 against the Cowboys, Collins made a team high 12 tackles as the Redskins lost 31–21. In week 6 against the Miami Dolphins, Collins recorded a team high 12 tackles and sacked Josh Rosen once as the Redskins won their first game of the season 17–16. He was named the NFC defensive player of the week for his performance.

==== 2020 season ====
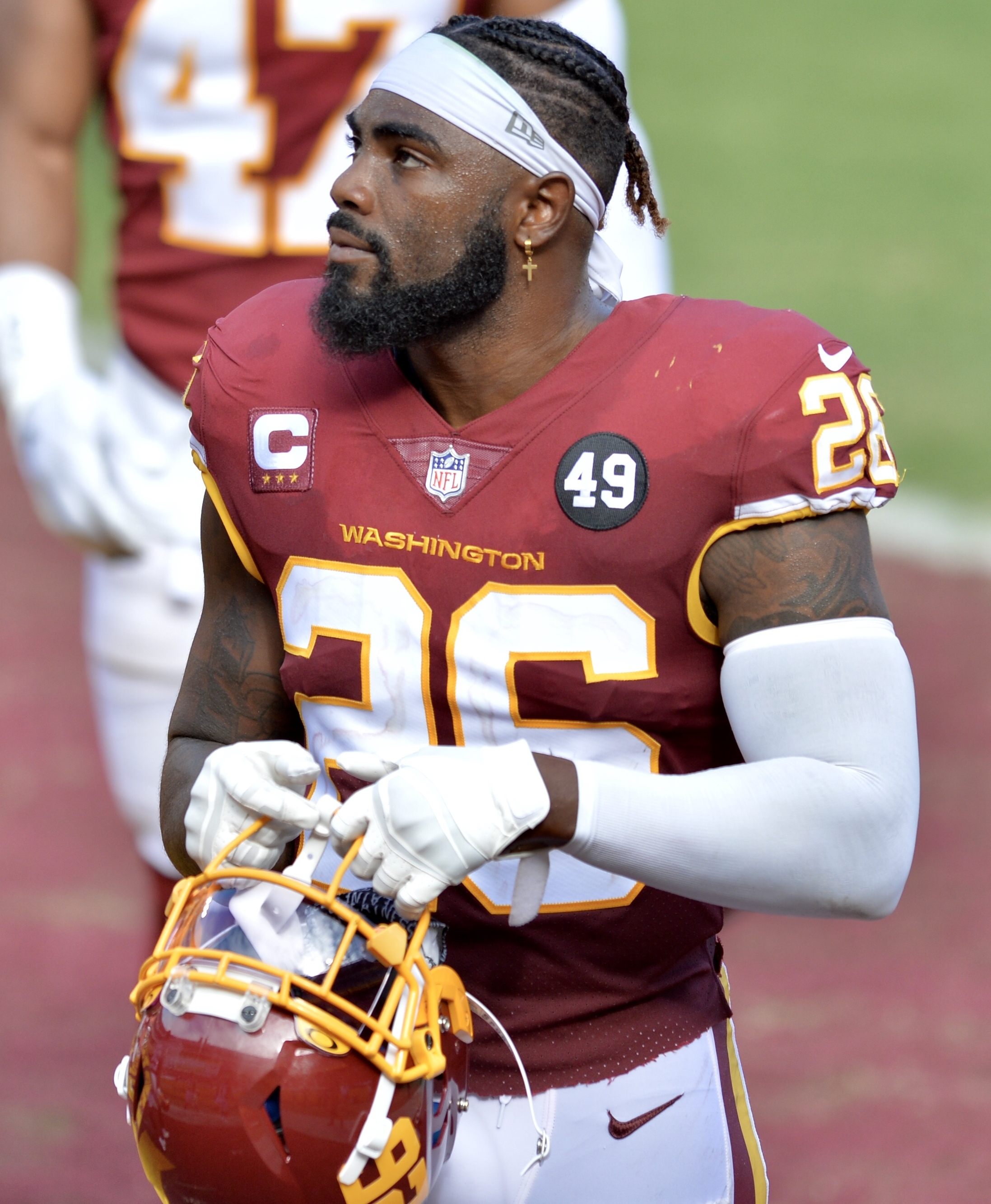
Collins in 2020

Prior to the beginning of the 2020 season, Collins switched to his college number #26 following the release of Adrian Peterson giving his number #20 to Jimmy Moreland. In Week 2 against the Arizona Cardinals, Collins recorded his first sack and his first interception on the season. In Week 7 against the Cowboys, Collins tore his Achilles and was placed on injured reserve on October 27.

==== 2021 season ====
After losing several linebackers to injury, Washington chose to switch Collins to a hybrid safety-linebacker role in October 2021. In Week 12 against the Seattle Seahawks, he forced a fumble on running back Alex Collins in Washington's 17–15 win. In the Week 14 game against the Cowboys, Collins had his first interception of the season against Dak Prescott, and also recorded two sacks. The following week against the Philadelphia Eagles, he recorded an interception off a ball that bounced off Dallas Goedert's foot, one pass deflection, and one fumble recovery. In that game, he suffered a foot injury and was placed on injured reserve on December 24. On March 16, 2022, the team designated Collins as a post-June 1 release.

=== New York Giants (second stint) ===
On October 6, 2022, Collins rejoined the Giants, signing to their practice squad. Collins was elevated from the practice squad for Week 7 and Week 8 games against the Jacksonville Jaguars and the Seattle Seahawks. He was elevated again in Week 16 and played 27 snaps at inside linebacker against Washington. The following week, on December 22, he was signed to the active roster. In Week 17 against the Indianapolis Colts, Collins intercepted a Nick Foles pass and returned it for a pick-six touchdown in the 38–10 win.

== Career statistics ==
=== NFL ===
Year	Team	Games		Tackles				Fumbles			Interceptions					
Year	Team	GP	GS	Cmb	Solo	Ast	Sck	FF	FR	Yds	Int	Yds	Avg	Lng	TD	PD
2015	NYG	16	16	112	84	28	0.0	1	0	0	1	0	0.0	0	0	9
2016	NYG	16	16	125	100	25	4.0	0	1	6	5	72	17.2	44T	1	13
2017	NYG	15	15	104	78	26	0.0	1	2	33	2	21	10.5	21	0	6
2018	NYG	12	12	96	67	29	0.0	1	0	0	0	0	0.0	0	0	4
2019	WAS	15	15	117	78	39	1.0	2	0	0	0	0	0.0	0	0	4
2020	WAS	7	7	41	24	17	2.0	1	0	0	1	1	1.0	0	0	1
2021	WAS	13	13	81	51	30	3.0	1	2	23	2	3	1.5	3	0	2
2022	NYG	6	1	15	7	8	1.0	0	0	0	1	52	52.0	52T	1	2
Career		100	95	691	489	202	11.0	7	5	62	12	149	12.4	52	2	41

=== College ===
Season	GP	Tackles						Interceptions			Fumbles		
Season	GP	Solo	Ast	Cmb	TfL	Yds	Sck	Int	Yds	TD	FF	FR	TD
2012	14	8	9	17	0.0	0	0.0	0	0	0	0	0	0
2013	13	54	15	70	4.0	8	0.0	2	89	1	2	0	1
2014	14	60	43	103	4.5	7	0.0	3	14	0	1	0	0
Total	41	122	67	190	8.5	15	0.0	5	103	1	3	0	1

== Personal life ==
A native of New Orleans, Louisiana, Collins grew up in the Algiers neighborhood. When Hurricane Katrina hit the city in 2005, Collins and his family had to leave, and eventually settled in Geismar in Ascension Parish. From ages 4–12, Tom Collins, Landon's father, was his football coach. Landon says his father "is the most influential coach I've ever had." Collins said that while his father coached him, he coined the nickname "Money" for his son because everything he touched "was just gold at the age of six". As a child, Landon's idols were former running back Clinton Portis, retired quarterback Peyton Manning, and the late Sean Taylor, who was a safety for the Redskins when he was murdered - Collins wore No. 21 to honor Sean Taylor. Collins also started playing baseball when he was 7 or 8 years old.

Collins is the son of Tom Collins and April Justin. His father is currently a station director at the Coastal Bridge Construction Company in Baton Rouge, Louisiana, while his mother resides in Florida. Collins is Justin's first-born son. He has two brothers, Gerald Willis and Justin Collins, and one sister, Gerrah Willis. Gerald also played college football at the University of Florida and for the University of Miami. Willis also played for Baltimore Ravens.

Collins' relationship with his mother has become much better. The two have never directly addressed Landon's decision to choose Alabama over LSU, which causes the issue to remain a source of tension in their relationship.

=== Kneeling controversy ===
Following U.S. President Donald Trump's September 2017 comments where he said that any player that kneels during the National Anthem should be fired or suspended, Collins and Giants teammates Damon Harrison and Olivier Vernon all took a knee in their third game of the 2017 season against the Philadelphia Eagles. When asked about his decision to kneel, Collins said he was "absolutely conflicted" as he loved the U.S., adding that he was crying as he knelt. Collins also referenced his uncle who previously served in the Army as an additional source of conflicted feelings while taking a knee during the anthem. When the Giants played the Tampa Bay Buccaneers the following week, Collins instead chose to raise his fist during the anthem. This decision came after Giants owner John Mara requested that the players stood during the anthem, while noting that he understood if they did not.
