= Tim Walton (American football) =

American football coach (born 1971)

Ohio State Buckeyes
- Title: Assistant head coach Co-defensive coordinator secondary/cornerbacks coach

Personal information
- Born: March 11, 1971 (age 55); Columbus, Georgia, U.S.

Career information
- High school: Carver
- College: Ohio State

Career history
- Bowling Green (1995) Graduate assistant; Bowling Green (1996–1998) Running backs coach; Bowling Green (1999) Defensive backs coach; Memphis (2000–2001) Defensive backs coach; Syracuse (2002) Defensive backs coach; LSU (2003) Defensive backs coach; Miami (2004–2006) Defensive backs coach; Miami (2007) Defensive coordinator; Memphis (2008) Defensive coordinator; Detroit Lions (2009–2012) Defensive backs coach; St. Louis Rams (2013) Defensive coordinator; New York Giants (2015–2017) Cornerbacks coach; Jacksonville Jaguars (2019–2021) Cornerbacks coach; Ohio State (2022–2024) Associate head coach/Secondary/Cornerbacks coach; Ohio State (2025–present) Co-defensive coordinator/Secondary/Cornerbacks coach

Awards and highlights
- CFP national champion (2024); BCS national champion (2003)
- Coaching profile at Pro Football Reference

Tim Walton (born March 11, 1971) is an American football coach who currently serves as the co-defensive coordinator, secondary, and cornerbacks coach at Ohio State University. He previously had a stint with the Jacksonville Jaguars and is the former defensive coordinator for the St. Louis Rams of the National Football League (NFL). He played college football at Ohio State.

Walton was the secondary coach under head coach Nick Saban when the Louisiana State Tigers won the BCS National Championship in 2003.

== NFL coaching career ==
=== Detroit Lions ===
Walton served four years as secondary coach for the Detroit Lions under head coach Jim Schwartz.

=== St. Louis Rams ===
Walton was hired by the St. Louis Rams as defensive coordinator on February 12, 2013. On January 29, 2014, the Rams announced they would not be renewing Walton's contract with the team. The Rams quickly hired Gregg Williams, a former Jeff Fisher assistant in Tennessee, to take Walton's place.

=== New York Giants ===
On January 15, 2015, the New York Giants announced they hired Walton as their secondary/cornerbacks coach.

=== Jacksonville Jaguars ===
On January 16, 2019, the Jacksonville Jaguars hired Walton as their cornerbacks coach. Head Coach Doug Marrone stated that the recommendation from Jim Schwartz was a big reason for Walton's hiring. ″He said if I’m going to be a head coach again, the one guy I would hire as a secondary coach would be Tim,″ Marrone said. ″When I brought him, everything that was told to me was exactly what I thought. Someone who is extremely strong, does a good job with players and gets a lot of out of them.″ In 2021 he was retained by Urban Meyer and remained on the Jaguars staff. He missed the team's week 5 game against the Tennessee Titans due to Covid-19 symptoms.

== Return to college coaching ==
=== Ohio State Buckeyes ===
On January 14, 2022, Walton was officially announced as the secondary/cornerbacks coach for his alma mater, the Ohio State Buckeyes.
