= Rueben Randle =

American football player (born 1991)

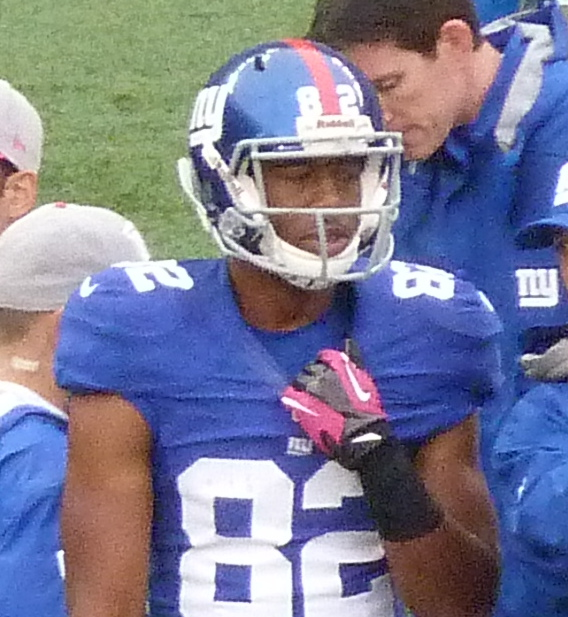
- Randle with the New York Giants in 2012

No. 82, 80
- Position: Wide receiver

Personal information
- Born: May 7, 1991 (age 35); Bastrop, Louisiana, U.S.
- Listed height: 6 ft 2 in (1.88 m)
- Listed weight: 203 lb (92 kg)

Career information
- High school: Bastrop
- College: LSU (2009–2011)
- NFL draft: 2012: 2nd round, 63rd overall pick

Career history
- New York Giants (2012–2015); Philadelphia Eagles (2016)*; Chicago Bears (2017); Winnipeg Blue Bombers (2018)*
- * Offseason or practice squad member only

Awards and highlights
- First-team All-SEC (2011)

Career NFL statistics
- Receptions: 188
- Receiving yards: 2,644
- Receiving touchdowns: 20
- Stats at Pro Football Reference

Rueben Jacob Randle (born May 7, 1991) is an American former professional football player who was a wide receiver in the National Football League (NFL). He played college football for the LSU Tigers, and was selected by the New York Giants in the second round of the 2012 NFL draft. He also spent time with the Philadelphia Eagles, Chicago Bears and Winnipeg Blue Bombers.

== Early life ==
Randle attended Bastrop High School in Bastrop, Louisiana, where he played both wide receiver and quarterback in his senior year due to the graduation of quarterback Randall Mackey. That year, Randle connected on 166 of 274 passes (60.6 completion percentage) for 2,442 yards and 20 touchdowns, while also rushing for a team-high 680 yards and 12 more scores.

His sophomore year, when Bastrop won the state championship, Randle had 14 catches for 433 yards and seven touchdowns. As a junior, Randle had 55 receptions for 1,058 yards and 11 touchdowns, earning him a Class 4A All-Louisiana designation. Randle earned All-American honors by Parade, USA Today, and SuperPrep, and was a participant in the 2009 U.S. Army All-American Bowl.

In addition to football, Randle also participated in basketball, baseball and track at Bastrop.

As one of the top-rated prospects in the nation, Randle was a consensus five-star prospect by all major recruiting services. Randle was considered a five-star recruit by Rivals.com, as well as the No. 1 wide receiver prospect and the No. 2 overall prospect in the nation. Randle had numerous scholarship offers, but on February 4, 2009 (National Signing Day), he committed to Louisiana State University via letter of intent. He also considered Alabama, Oklahoma, Oklahoma State and Miami.

Randle is an athlete that is a cross between A. J. Green and Julio Jones. He should have a similar impact at the next level.

— Daniel Montoya, a national recruiting analyst for Rivals.com.

== College career ==
In three seasons at LSU, Randle caught 97 passes for 1,634 yards and 13 touchdowns. As a junior, he was a first-team All-Southeastern Conference (SEC) selection by SEC coaches, and earned second-team honors from the Associated Press. Following LSU's loss in the 2011 National Championship game vs. Alabama, Randle announced his intention to enter the upcoming NFL draft.

== Professional career ==
Pre-draft measurables
| Height | Weight | Arm length | Hand span | Wingspan | 40-yard dash | 10-yard split | 20-yard split | 20-yard shuttle | Three-cone drill | Vertical jump | Broad jump | Bench press |
|---|---|---|---|---|---|---|---|---|---|---|---|---|
| 6 ft 2 7/8 in (1.90 m) | 210 lb (95 kg) | 33 in (0.84 m) | 9 1/2 in (0.24 m) | 6 ft 5 in (1.96 m) | 4.43 s | 1.52 s | 2.57 s | 4.36 s | 6.99 s | 31.0 in (0.79 m) | 10 ft 1 in (3.07 m) | 15 reps |
All values from NFL Combine/Pro Day

=== New York Giants ===
On April 27, 2012, Randle was selected by the New York Giants in the second round of the 2012 NFL draft with the 63rd overall pick. On May 11, Randle signed his rookie contract with the Giants.

He totaled 188 receptions for 2,644 yards and 20 touchdowns in his four-year tenure with the Giants.

=== Philadelphia Eagles ===
On March 23, 2016, Randle signed a one-year contract worth roughly $3 million with the Philadelphia Eagles. He was released on August 28.

=== Chicago Bears ===
On January 10, 2017, Randle signed a reserve/future contract with the Chicago Bears. On August 13, 2017, Randle was placed on injured reserve with a hamstring injury. He was released on September 12, 2017.

=== Winnipeg Blue Bombers ===
On May 22, 2018 the Winnipeg Blue Bombers of the Canadian Football League (CFL) announced they had signed Randle to a contract. He was released on June 9.

== Career statistics ==
Legend
| **Bold** | League career high |

=== NFL career statistics ===
| Year | Team | Games | | Receiving | | | | | Rushing | | | | | Fumbles | |
| Year | Team | GP | GS | Rec | Yds | Avg | Lng | TD | Att | Yds | Avg | Lng | TD | Fum | Lost |
|---|---|---|---|---|---|---|---|---|---|---|---|---|---|---|---|
| 2012 | NYG | **16** | 1 | 19 | 298 | **15.7** | 56 | 3 | 0 | 0 | 0.0 | 0 | 0 | 1 | 0 |
| 2013 | NYG | **16** | 3 | 41 | 611 | 14.9 | 37T | 6 | 0 | 0 | 0.0 | 0 | 0 | **3** | **1** |
| 2014 | NYG | **16** | 13 | **71** | **938** | 13.2 | 49 | 3 | 0 | 0 | 0.0 | 0 | 0 | 0 | 0 |
| 2015 | NYG | **16** | **16** | 57 | 797 | 14.0 | **72T** | **8** | 0 | 0 | 0.0 | 0 | 0 | 0 | 0 |
| Total | | 64 | 33 | 188 | 2,644 | 14.1 | 72T | 20 | 0 | 0 | 0.0 | 0 | 0 | 4 | 1 |
