= Justin Currie (American football) =

American football player (born 1993)

Profile
- Position: Safety / Linebacker

Personal information
- Born: September 19, 1993 (age 33); Royal Oak, Michigan, U.S.
- Listed height: 6 ft 2 in (1.88 m)
- Listed weight: 220 lb (100 kg)

Career information
- High school: Big Rapids (Big Rapids, Michigan)
- College: Western Michigan
- NFL draft: 2015: undrafted

Career history
- New York Giants (2015); Cleveland Browns (2016–2018); Seattle Seahawks (2018–2019)

Awards and highlights
- Second-team All-MAC (2012)
- Stats at Pro Football Reference

Justin Currie (born September 19, 1993) is an American former professional football player who was a safety and linebacker in the National Football League (NFL). He played college football for the Western Michigan Broncos and was signed by the New York Giants as an undrafted free agent in 2015.

== Professional career ==
=== New York Giants ===
On May 7, 2015, Currie was signed by the New York Giants as an undrafted free agent. He fractured his ankle in a preseason game against the Jaguars and spent his entire rookie year on injured reserve.

On September 3, 2016, Currie was released by the Giants.

=== Cleveland Browns ===
On December 7, 2016, Currie was signed to the Cleveland Browns' practice squad. He signed a reserve/future contract with the Browns on January 2, 2017.

On August 23, 2017, Currie was waived/injured by the Browns after suffering an ankle injury in the team's second preseason game. He was re-signed by the Browns on November 21, 2017. He was waived on November 30, 2017 and was re-signed to the practice squad. He was promoted to the active roster on December 8, 2017.

On August 31, 2018, Currie was waived/injured by the Browns and was placed on injured reserve. He was released on September 11, 2018.

=== Seattle Seahawks ===
On October 23, 2018, Currie was signed to the Seattle Seahawks practice squad. He signed a reserve/future contract on January 7, 2019. He was waived/injured on August 31, 2019 and placed on injured reserve. He was waived from injured reserve on September 30.
