= Uani 'Unga =

American football player and coach (born 1987)

Uani Unga
Southern Utah Thunderbirds
- Title: Linebackers coach

Personal information
- Born: December 28, 1987 (age 38); Pomona, California, U.S.
- Listed height: 6 ft 1 in (1.85 m)
- Listed weight: 233 lb (106 kg)

Career information
- High school: Kahuku (HI)
- College: Brigham Young
- NFL draft: 2014: undrafted

Career history

Playing
- New York Giants (2014–2016)

Coaching
- Utah State (2017) (Defensive administrative assistant); Utah State (2018-2019) (Outside Linebackers); Southern Utah (2019-present) (Linebackers/special teams)

Career NFL statistics
- Total tackles: 59
- Forced fumbles: 2
- Pass deflections: 4
- Interceptions: 2
- Stats at Pro Football Reference

Uani "Devin" Unga (born December 28, 1987) is an American football linebacker coach at Southern Utah University, and a former linebacker himself. He played college football at Oregon State in 2009 and 2010 before transferring to Brigham Young in 2012 and led the nation in tackles his final season in 2013. He served a two-year Mormon mission to Guatemala City Central after high school.

He was undrafted in 2014, and played his entire professional career with the New York Giants.

== Professional career ==
=== New York Giants ===
Unga was not drafted in the 2014 NFL draft after suffering a serious knee injury on the final play in his college career.

Unga was signed by the New York Giants on December 23, 2014, as a member of the practice squad, up until that point he spent the season rehabbing a knee injury. On September 5, 2015, Unga made the final 53-man roster for the New York Giants On September 13, 2015, Unga would get his first career start against the Dallas Cowboys where he recorded his first career interception against Tony Romo in a 27-26 loss. Unga recorded his second interception in a September 24, 2015, game against the Redskins.

On May 10, 2016, Unga was waived/injured by the Giants and was placed on injured reserve.

On February 8, 2017, Unga was released by the Giants.

== Coaching career ==
It was announced that Unga will be a Defensive administrative assistant at Utah State University beginning for the 2017 football season. On February 12, 2018 'Unga was added as a full-time coach at Utah State University to coach the outside linebackers, ending his playing career. On August 25, 2019, Unga joined Southern Utah coaching staff as their Linebackers coach.

== Personal life ==
His older brothers, Paul and J.J. Unga, were also football players. Paul, a defensive end at Arizona State and J.J. an offensive guard at Midwestern State. He also has a twin brother Feti who played linebacker at Oregon State. His younger brother Metuisela played tight end for the University of Hawaii and his other younger brother Chris played defensive tackle for Utah State. He is the cousin of former NFL running backs Harvey Unga, Reno Mahe, and Naufahu Tahi.
