= Big Rapids Public Schools =

School district in Michigan, United States

Address
- 21034 15 Mile Road Big Rapids, Mecosta, Michigan, 49307; United States

District information
- Grades: Pre-Kindergarten–12
- Superintendent: Tim Haist
- Schools: 6
- Budget: $33,952,000 2022–2023 expenditures
- NCES District ID: 2605780

Students and staff
- Students: 2,411 (2024–2025)
- Teachers: 121.8 (on an FTE basis) (2024–2025)
- Staff: 287.11 FTE (2024–2025)
- Student–teacher ratio: 19.79 (2024–2025)

Other information
- Website: www.brps.org

Big Rapids Public Schools is a public school district in Mecosta County, Michigan. It serves Big Rapids, and parts of the townships of Big Rapids, Chippewa, Colfax, Grant, Green, and Martiny. It also serves parts of Barton, Goodwell, Monroe, and Norwich townships in Newaygo County.

== History ==
A two-story brick school was built in Big Rapids in 1859. A school had been built in another district in Green Township the year prior. In 1868, the two districts merged, forming a union school district. The new union school, which contained a high school, opened in 1870, and by that year several grade schools had also been built in the city.

By 1881, the union school was in danger of falling into Mitchell Creek. A new high school was built that year and opened in January 1882.

In fall 1925, a new high school opened as an addition to a school built around 1900. A bond issue to build four elementary schools passed in 1954.

By 1960, the high school was dangerously overcrowded, and "housed 787 in grades 7 through 12. It was built for 400 to 500 pupils," according to the Grand Rapids Press. "Classrooms in both the old section and the newer addition built in 1924 are poorly lit and improperly ventilated... The odor of stale perspiration permeates the building." Where to build a new high school, if at all, was a matter of great controversy in Big Rapids.

The district attempted to pass bond issues to replace the high school three times before one was approved by voters in 1962. A new high school, designed by architecture firm Daverman Associates of Grand Rapids, opened in February 1964. The previous high school then became a middle school.

The current high school opened in January 1998. Designed by GMB Architects and Engineers, it was featured in the 1999 Architectural Portfolio of American School & University magazine. The 1964 building is currently the district's middle school.

== Schools ==
Schools in Big Rapids Public Schools district
School	Address	Notes
Big Rapids High School	21175 15 Mile Road, Big Rapids	Grades 9-12. Opened 1998.
Big Rapids Middle School	500 N. Warren, Big Rapids	Grades 5–8. Opened 1964.
Brookside Elementary	210 Escott, Big Rapids	Grades 1–4
Eastwood Elementary Early Childhood Center	410 N. 3rd Avenue, Big Rapids	Grades PreK-K
Riverview Elementary	509 Willow, Big Rapids	Grades 1–4
Big Rapids Virtual School	14980 215th Avenue, Big Rapids	Online learning. Grades K-12.
