= 2013 New York Giants season =

89th season in franchise history

- Owner: John Mara; Steve Tisch
- General manager: Jerry Reese
- Head coach: Tom Coughlin
- Home stadium: MetLife Stadium

Results
- Record: 7–9
- Division place: 3rd NFC East
- Playoffs: Did not qualify
- Pro Bowlers: S Antrel Rolle

Uniform
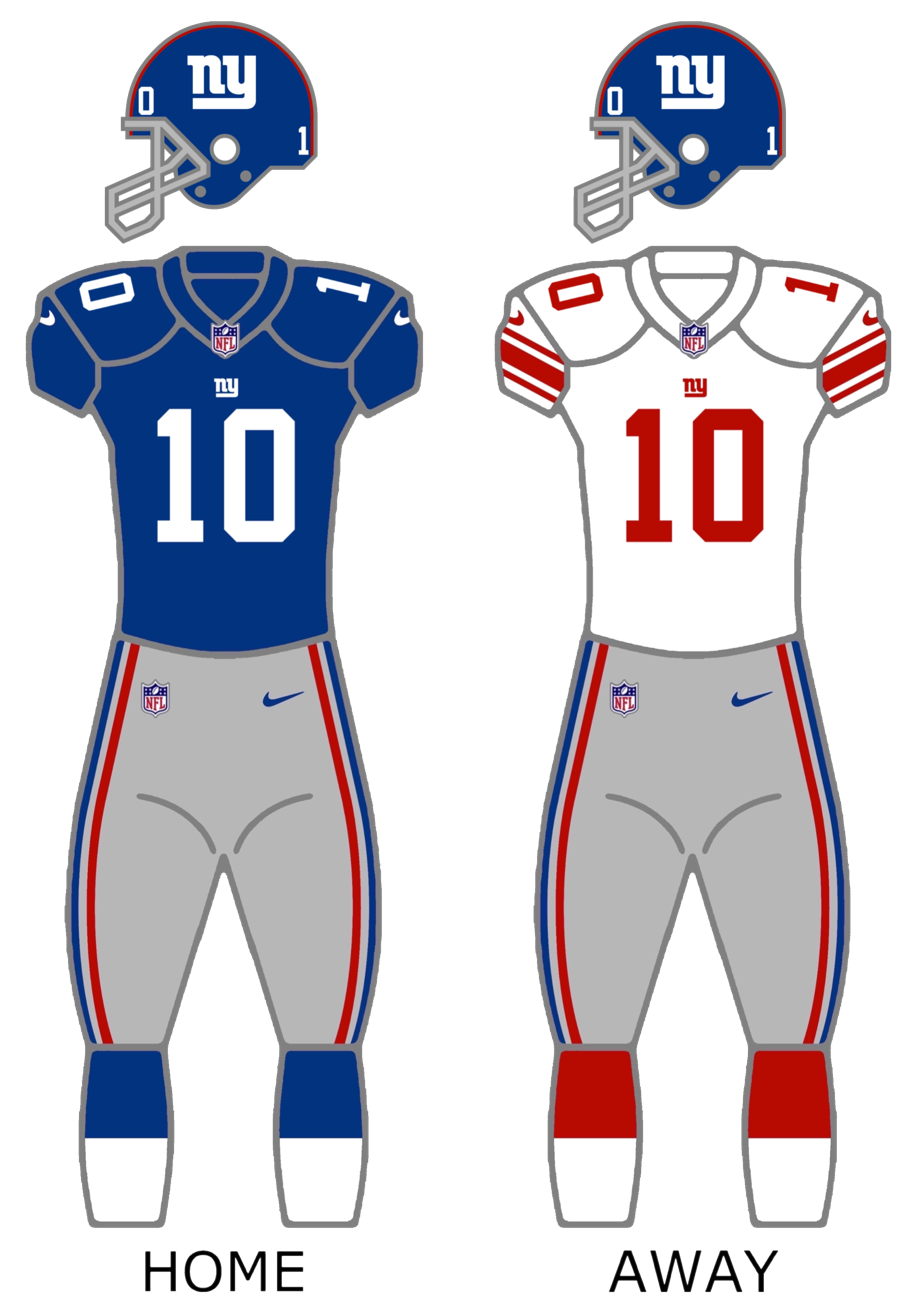

The 2013 season was the New York Giants' 89th in the National Football League (NFL), their fourth playing home games at MetLife Stadium and their 10th under head coach Tom Coughlin.

The Giants attempted to attain a playoff berth after failing to do so in 2012, and be the first team to play the Super Bowl on their own home field, which they share with the New York Jets. However, they failed to improve on their 9–7 record and were eliminated from playoff contention for the second consecutive season after their Week 14 loss to the Chargers. The Giants started 0–6, but rallied to win 7 of their last 10, finishing 7–9. This was their first losing season since Eli Manning’s rookie year in 2004.

== 2013 draft class ==
2013 New York Giants draft
Round	Pick	Player	Position	College	Notes
1	19	Justin Pugh	Offensive tackle	Syracuse	
2	49	Johnathan Hankins	Defensive tackle	Ohio State	
3	81	Damontre Moore	Defensive end	Texas A&M	
4	110	Ryan Nassib	Quarterback	Syracuse	From the Arizona Cardinals
5	152	Cooper Taylor	Safety	Richmond	
7	225	Eric Herman	Guard	Ohio	Player cut in 2014 offseason.
7	253	Michael Cox	Running back	UMass	Compensatory selection, Player cut in 2014 offseason.
Made roster † Pro Football Hall of Fame * Made at least one Pro Bowl during career

Notes

- The Giants traded their fourth-round selection (No. 116 overall) and sixth-round selection (No. 187 overall) to the Arizona Cardinals in exchange for the Cardinals' fourth-round selection (No. 110 overall).

== Staff ==
2013 New York Giants staff
Front office: President/CEO – John Mara; Chairman/executive vice president – Steve Tisch; Senior vice president/general manager – Jerry Reese; Senior vice president of player personnel – Chris Mara; Assistant general manager – Kevin Abrams; Director of pro personnel – Ken Sternfeld; Director of college scouting – Marc Ross; Director of football operations – Matt Harriss; Head coaches: Head coach – Tom Coughlin; Offensive coaches: Offensive coordinator – Kevin Gilbride; Quarterbacks – Sean Ryan; Running backs – Jerald Ingram; Wide receivers – Kevin Gilbride, Jr.; Tight ends – Mike Pope; Offensive line – Pat Flaherty; Assistant offensive line – Lunda Wells; Offensive assistant – Ryan Roeder	Defensive coaches: Defensive coordinator – Perry Fewell; Defensive line – Robert Nunn; Linebackers – Jim Herrmann; Secondary/cornerbacks – Peter Giunta; Secondary/safeties – David Merritt; Defensive assistant – Rob Leonard; Special teams coaches: Special teams coordinator – Tom Quinn; Assistant special teams – Larry Izzo; Strength and conditioning: Strength and conditioning – Jerry Palmieri; Assistant strength and conditioning – Markus Paul; Strength and conditioning assistant – Joe Danos

== Final roster ==
2013 New York Giants roster
Quarterbacks (QB): 10 Eli Manning; 9 Ryan Nassib; 17 Curtis Painter; Running backs (RB): 35 Andre Brown; 39 John Conner FB; 29 Michael Cox KR; 44 Peyton Hillis; Wide receivers (WR): 80 Victor Cruz; 12 Jerrel Jernigan; 18 Louis Murphy; 88 Hakeem Nicks; 82 Rueben Randle PR; 19 Julian Talley; Tight ends (TE): 84 Larry Donnell; 83 Brandon Myers; 86 Bear Pascoe; 81 Adrien Robinson	Offensive linemen (OL): 65 Will Beatty T; 77 Kevin Boothe G/C; 73 James Brewer G; 66 David Diehl G; 79 Stephen Goodin G/T; 62 Eric Herman G; 67 Brandon Mosley G/T; 72 Justin Pugh T; 61 Dallas Reynolds C; Defensive linemen (DL): 96 Johnathan Hankins DT; 99 Cullen Jenkins DT; 97 Linval Joseph DT; 94 Mathias Kiwanuka DE; 78 Markus Kuhn DT; 98 Damontre Moore DE; 93 Mike Patterson DT; 90 Jason Pierre-Paul DE; 91 Justin Tuck DE	Linebackers (LB): 52 Jon Beason MLB; 59 Allen Bradford OLB; 53 Marcus Dowtin OLB; 58 Mark Herzlich MLB; 54 Spencer Paysinger OLB; 55 Keith Rivers OLB; 57 Jacquian Williams OLB; Defensive backs (DB): 20 Prince Amukamara CB; 25 Will Hill FS; 28 Jayron Hosley CB; 37 Charles James CB; 38 Trumaine McBride CB; 21 Ryan Mundy FS; 26 Antrel Rolle SS; 24 Terrell Thomas CB; Special teams (ST): 3 Josh Brown K; 51 Zak DeOssie LS; 5 Steve Weatherford P	Practice squad: 71 Kendrick Adams DE; 74 Steven Baker T; 46 Kendall Gaskins RB; 13 Marcus Harris WR; 47 Travis Howard CB; 49 Junior Mertile CB; 43 Chaz Powell S; 41 Ross Weaver CB; Reserve: 89 Kris Adams WR (IR); 64 David Baas C (IR); 27 Stevie Brown FS (IR); 63 Jim Cordle C (IR); 45 Henry Hynoski FB (IR); 34 Brandon Jacobs RB (IR); 95 Shaun Rogers DT (IR); 31 Aaron Ross CB (IR); 33 Da'Rel Scott RB (IR); 76 Chris Snee G (IR); 30 Cooper Taylor SS (IR); 23 Corey Webster CB (IR); 22 David Wilson RB (IR); Rookies in italics 53 active, 13 reserve, 8 practice squad

== Schedule ==
=== Preseason ===
Week	Date	Opponent	Result	Record	Venue	Recap
1	August 10	at Pittsburgh Steelers	**W** 18–13	1–0	Heinz Field	Recap
2	August 18	Indianapolis Colts	**L** 12–20	1–1	MetLife Stadium	Recap
3	August 24	New York Jets	**L** 21–24 (OT)	1–2	MetLife Stadium	Recap
4	August 29	at New England Patriots	**L** 20–28	1–3	Gillette Stadium	Recap

=== Regular season ===
Week	Date	Opponent	Result	Record	Venue	Recap
1	September 8	at **Dallas Cowboys**	**L** 31–36	0–1	AT&T Stadium	Recap
2	September 15	Denver Broncos	**L** 23–41	0–2	MetLife Stadium	Recap
3	September 22	at Carolina Panthers	**L** 0–38	0–3	Bank of America Stadium	Recap
4	September 29	at Kansas City Chiefs	**L** 7–31	0–4	Arrowhead Stadium	Recap
5	October 6	**Philadelphia Eagles**	**L** 21–36	0–5	MetLife Stadium	Recap
6	October 10	at Chicago Bears	**L** 21–27	0–6	Soldier Field	Recap
7	October 21	Minnesota Vikings	**W** 23–7	1–6	MetLife Stadium	Recap
8	October 27	at **Philadelphia Eagles**	**W** 15–7	2–6	Lincoln Financial Field	Recap
9	Bye					
10	November 10	Oakland Raiders	**W** 24–20	3–6	MetLife Stadium	Recap
11	November 17	Green Bay Packers	**W** 27–13	4–6	MetLife Stadium	Recap
12	November 24	**Dallas Cowboys**	**L** 21–24	4–7	MetLife Stadium	Recap
13	December 1	at **Washington Redskins**	**W** 24–17	5–7	FedExField	Recap
14	December 8	at San Diego Chargers	**L** 14–37	5–8	Qualcomm Stadium	Recap
15	December 15	Seattle Seahawks	**L** 0–23	5–9	MetLife Stadium	Recap
16	December 22	at Detroit Lions	**W** 23–20 (OT)	6–9	Ford Field	Recap
17	December 29	**Washington Redskins**	**W** 20–6	7–9	MetLife Stadium	Recap

Note: Intra-division opponents are in bold text.

=== Game summaries ===
==== Week 1: at Dallas Cowboys ====
Week One: New York Giants at Dallas Cowboys – Game summary

Quarter	1	2	3	4	Total
Giants	3	7	7	14	**31**
**Cowboys**	3	10	14	9	**36**

at AT&T Stadium, Arlington, Texas

- Date: September 8
- Game time: 8:30 p.m. EDT/7:30 p.m. CDT
- Game weather: Played indoors (retractable roof closed)
- Game attendance: 85,348
- Referee: Tony Corrente
- TV announcers (NBC): Al Michaels, Cris Collinsworth and Michele Tafoya
- Recap, Game book

Game information

**First quarter**

- DAL – Dan Bailey 30-yard field goal, 13:04. Cowboys 3–0. **Drive: 4 plays, 3 yards, 1:49.**
- NYG – Josh Brown 20-yard field goal, 2:02. Tied 3–3. **Drive: 4 plays, -1 yards, 1:58.**

**Second quarter**

- DAL – Dan Bailey 38-yard field goal, 10:02. Cowboys 6–3. **Drive: 14 plays, 60 yards, 7:00.**
- DAL – Jason Witten 15-yard pass from Tony Romo (Dan Bailey kick), 2:55. Cowboys 13–3. **Drive: 9 plays, 71 yards, 4:57.**
- NYG – Victor Cruz 70-yard pass from Eli Manning (Josh Brown kick), 1:50. Cowboys 13–10. **Drive: 3 plays, 80 yards, 1:05.**

**Third quarter**

- DAL – Barry Church 27-yard defensive fumble return (Dan Bailey kick), 12:31. Cowboys 20–10.
- DAL – Jason Witten 4-yard pass from Tony Romo (Dan Bailey kick), 4:55. Cowboys 27–10. **Drive: 2 plays, 16 yards, 0:49.**
- NYG – Victor Cruz 18-yard pass from Eli Manning (Josh Brown kick), 1:44. Cowboys 27–17. **Drive: 8 plays, 80 yards, 3:11.**

**Fourth quarter**

- DAL – Dan Bailey 45-yard field goal, 12:10. Cowboys 30–17. **Drive: 8 plays, 53 yards, 4:34.**
- NYG – Victor Cruz 10-yard pass from Eli Manning (Josh Brown kick), 8:47. Cowboys 30–24. **Drive: 7 plays, 90 yards, 3:23.**
- DAL – Brandon Carr 49-yard interception return (pass failed), 1:50. Cowboys 36–24.
- NYG – Brandon Myers 4-yard pass from Eli Manning (Josh Brown kick), 0:11. Cowboys 36–31. **Drive: 9 plays, 80 yards, 1:39.**

**Top passers**

- NYG – Eli Manning – 27/42, 450 YDS, 4 TD, 3 INT
- DAL – Tony Romo – 36/49, 263 YDS, 2 TD, INT

**Top rushers**

- NYG – Da'Rel Scott – 5 CAR, 23 YDS
- DAL – DeMarco Murray – 20 CAR, 86 YDS

**Top receivers**

- NYG – Victor Cruz – 5 REC, 118 YDS, 3 TD
- DAL – Miles Austin – 10 REC, 72 YDS

**Top tacklers**

- NYG – Terrell Thomas – 6 TKL, AST
- DAL – Barry Church – 7 TKL, AST

This marked the Giants' first ever loss at AT&T Stadium since it opened in 2009.

==== Week 2: vs. Denver Broncos ====
Week Two: Denver Broncos at New York Giants – Game summary

Quarter	1	2	3	4	Total
**Broncos**	0	10	14	17	**41**
Giants	3	6	7	7	**23**

at MetLife Stadium, East Rutherford, New Jersey

- Date: September 15
- Game time: 4:25 p.m. EDT
- Game weather: 70 °F (21.1 °C), Mostly Sunny
- Game attendance: 81,285
- Referee: Gene Steratore
- TV announcers (CBS): Jim Nantz, Phil Simms and Tracy Wolfson
- Recap, Game book

Game information

**First quarter**

- NYG – Josh Brown 36-yard field goal, 7:41. Giants 3–0. **Drive: 7 plays, 62 yards, 3:09.**

**Second quarter**

- DEN – Knowshon Moreno 20-yard run (Matt Prater kick), 14:22. Broncos 7–3. **Drive: 4 plays, 40 yards, 0:48.**
- NYG – Josh Brown 24-yard field goal, 6:53. Broncos 7–6. **Drive: 6 plays, 37 yards, 2:31.**
- NYG – Josh Brown 41-yard field goal, 2:19. Giants 9–7. **Drive: 7 plays, 37 yards, 3:46.**
- DEN – Matt Prater 42-yard field goal, 0:47. Broncos 10–9. **Drive: 8 plays, 56 yards, 1:32.**

**Third quarter**

- DEN – Wes Welker 2-yard pass from Peyton Manning (Matt Prater kick), 8:58. Broncos 17–9. **Drive: 9 plays, 53 yards, 4:28.**
- NYG – Brandon Jacobs 1-yard run (Josh Brown kick), 3:08. Broncos 17–16. **Drive: 9 plays, 81 yards, 5:50.**
- DEN – Knowshon Moreno 25-yard run (Matt Prater kick), 0:25. Broncos 24–16. **Drive: 7 plays, 80 yards, 2:43.**

**Fourth quarter**

- DEN – Julius Thomas 11-yard pass from Peyton Manning (Matt Prater kick), 12:19. Broncos 31–16. **Drive: 5 plays, 36 yards, 2:34.**
- DEN – Trindon Holliday 81-yard punt return (Matt Prater kick), 10:13. Broncos 38–16.
- NYG – Da'Rel Scott 23-yard pass from Eli Manning (Josh Brown kick), 3:59. Broncos 38–23. **Drive: 4 plays, 71 yards, 1:13.**
- DEN – Matt Prater 47-yard field goal, 2:38. Broncos 41–23. **Drive: 7 plays, 15 yards, 1:21.**

**Top passers**

- DEN – Peyton Manning – 30/43, 307 YDS, 2 TD
- NYG – Eli Manning – 28/49, 362 YDS, TD, 4 INT

**Top rushers**

- DEN – Knowshon Moreno – 13 CAR, 93 YDS, 2 TD
- NYG – David Wilson – 7 CAR, 17 YDS

**Top receivers**

- DEN – Eric Decker – 9 REC, 87 YDS
- NYG – Victor Cruz – 8 REC, 118 YDS

**Top tacklers**

- DEN – Danny Trevathan – 8 TKL, 2 AST, SK
- NYG – Prince Amukamara – 10 TKL

This would be the last time the Manning brothers played against each other in the NFL, with Peyton retiring after the 2015 season.

==== Week 3: at Carolina Panthers ====
Week Three: New York Giants at Carolina Panthers – Game summary

Quarter	1	2	3	4	Total
Giants	0	0	0	0	**0**
**Panthers**	7	10	14	7	**38**

at Bank of America Stadium, Charlotte, North Carolina

- Date: September 22
- Game time: 1:00 p.m. EDT
- Game weather: 75 °F (23.9 °C), Sunny
- Game attendance: 73,748
- Referee: Mike Carey
- TV announcers (Fox): Thom Brennaman, Brian Billick and Laura Okmin
- Recap, Game book

Game information

**First quarter**

- CAR Mike Tolbert 2-yard run (Graham Gano kick) (12–59, 5:50) (CAR 7-0)

**Second quarter**

- CAR Gano 53-yard FG (10–37, 4:54) (CAR 10-0)
- CAR Brandon LaFell 16-yard pass from Newton (Gano kick) (13–65, 3:33) (CAR 17-0)

**Third quarter**

- CAR LaFell 20-yard pass from Newton (Gano kick) (6–80, 3:25) (CAR 24-0)
- CAR Newton 3-yard run (Gano kick) (7–38, 3:52) (CAR 31-0)

**Fourth quarter**

- CAR Ginn 47-yard pass from Newton (Gano kick) (6–87, 3:07) (CAR 38-0)

**Top passers**

- NYG – Eli Manning – 12/23, 119 YDS, INT
- CAR – Cam Newton – 15/27, 223 YDS, 3 TD, INT

**Top rushers**

- NYG – David Wilson – 11 CAR, 39 YDS
- CAR – DeAngelo Williams – 23 CAR, 120 YDS

**Top receivers**

- NYG – Rueben Randle – 2 REC, 40 YDS
- CAR – Ted Ginn Jr. – 3 REC, 71 YDS, TD

**Top tacklers**

- NYG – Linval Joseph – 5 TKL, 3 AST; Ryan Mundy – 5 TKL, 4 AST; Jason Pierre-Paul – 5 TKL
- CAR – Greg Hardy – 5 TKL, 3 AST, 3 SK

With the shutout loss, the Giants fell to their first 0–3 start since 1996.

==== Week 4: at Kansas City Chiefs ====
Week Four: New York Giants at Kansas City Chiefs – Game summary

Quarter	1	2	3	4	Total
Giants	0	7	0	0	**7**
**Chiefs**	0	10	7	14	**31**

at Arrowhead Stadium, Kansas City, Missouri

- Date: September 29
- Game time: 1:00 p.m. EDT/12:00 p.m. CDT
- Game weather: 66 °F (18.9 °C), Sunny
- Game attendance: 73,386
- Referee: Terry McAulay
- TV announcers (Fox): Kevin Burkhardt, John Lynch and Erin Andrews
- Recap, Game book

Game information

**Second quarter**

- KC - McGrath 5-yard pass from Smith (Ryan Succop kick) (11–98, 5:38) (KC 7-0)
- NYG - Cruz 69-yard pass from Manning (Josh Brown kick) (2–74, 0:54) (Tied 7-7)
- KC - Succop 51-yard FG (5–31, 1:53) (KC 10-7)

**Third quarter**

- KC - Dexter McCluster 89-yard punt return (Succop kick) (KC 17-7)

**Fourth quarter**

- KC - Charles 2-yard pass from Smith (Succop kick) (14–80, 9:17) (KC 24-7)
- KC - Dwayne Bowe 34-yard pass from Smith (Succop kick) (3–35, 1:25) (KC 31-7)

**Top passers**

- NYG – Eli Manning – 18/37, 217 YDS, TD, INT
- KC – Alex Smith – 24/41, 288 YDS, 3 TD, 2 INT

**Top rushers**

- NYG – David Wilson – 13 CAR, 55 YDS
- KC – Jamaal Charles – 18 CAR, 65 YDS

**Top receivers**

- NYG – Victor Cruz – 10 REC, 164 YDS, TD
- KC – Sean McGrath – 5 REC, 64 YDS, TD

**Top tacklers**

- NYG – Mark Herzlich – 7 TKL, AST; Spencer Paysinger – 7 TKL, SK
- KC – Derrick Johnson – 8 TKL, AST

With the loss, the Giants fell to their first 0–4 start since 1987 – which coincidentally also followed a Super Bowl victory.

==== Week 5: vs. Philadelphia Eagles ====
Week Five: Philadelphia Eagles at New York Giants – Game summary

Quarter	1	2	3	4	Total
**Eagles**	3	16	3	14	**36**
Giants	7	0	14	0	**21**

at MetLife Stadium, East Rutherford, New Jersey

- Date: October 6
- Game time: 1:00 p.m. EDT
- Game weather: 66 °F (18.9 °C), Mostly Cloudy
- Game attendance: 80,738
- Referee: Walt Coleman
- TV announcers (Fox): Thom Brennaman, Brian Billick and Laura Okmin
- Recap, Game book

Game information

**First quarter**

- NYG Wilson 5-yard run (Josh Brown kick) (5–62, 2:24) (NYG 7-0)
- PHI Alex Henery 40-yard FG (10–58, 4:48) (NYG 7-3)

**Second quarter**

- PHI Henery 27-yard FG (8–51, 3:21) (NYG 7-6)
- PHI LeSean McCoy 1-yard run (Henery kick) (4–71, 1:29) (PHI 13-7)
- PHI Henery 29-yard FG (8–36, 3:51) (PHI 16-7)
- PHI Henery 36-yard FG (11–75, 1:33) (PHI 19-7)

**Third quarter**

- NYG Randle 26-yard pass from Manning (Josh Brown kick) (7–87, 3:44) (PHI 19-14)
- NYG Randle 6-yard pass from Manning (Josh Brown kick) (7–51, 1:57) (NYG 21-19)
- PHI Henery 41-yard FG (8–57, 2:42) (PHI 22-21)

**Fourth quarter**

- PHI Brent Celek 25-yard pass from Foles (Henery kick) (1–25, 0:09) (PHI 29-21)
- PHI Jackson 5-yard pass from Foles (Henery kick) (4–38, 1:38) (PHI 36-21)

**Top passers**

- PHI – Nick Foles – 16/25, 197 YDS, 2 TD
- NYG – Eli Manning – 24/52, 334 YDS, 2 TD, 3 INT

**Top rushers**

- PHI – Michael Vick – 7 CAR, 79 YDS
- NYG – Brandon Jacobs – 11 CAR, 37 YDS

**Top receivers**

- PHI – DeSean Jackson – 7 REC, 132 YDS, TD
- NYG – Hakeem Nicks – 9 REC, 142 YDS

**Top tacklers**

- PHI – Bradley Fletcher – 9 TKL; Cary Williams – 9 TKL, 2 AST
- NYG – Will Hill – 11 TKL

With the loss, the Giants fell to 0–5, their worst start since the strike-shortened 1987 season and their 1979 season.

==== Week 6: at Chicago Bears ====
Week Six: New York Giants at Chicago Bears – Game summary

Quarter	1	2	3	4	Total
Giants	7	7	7	0	**21**
**Bears**	7	17	3	0	**27**

at Soldier Field, Chicago, Illinois

- Date: October 10
- Game time: 8:25 p.m. EDT/7:25 p.m. CDT
- Game weather: 63 °F (17.2 °C), Clear
- Game attendance: 62,374
- Referee: John Parry
- TV announcers (NFLN): Brad Nessler, Mike Mayock and Alex Flanagan
- Recap, Game book

Game information

**First quarter**

- CHI Tim Jennings 48-yard interception return (Robbie Gould kick) (CHI 7-0)
- NYG Jacobs 4-yard run (Josh Brown kick) (10–80, 6:02) (Tied 7-7)

**Second quarter**

- CHI Marshall 10-yard pass from Cutler (Gould kick) (8–86, 4:30) (CHI 14-7)
- NYG Randle 37-yard pass from Manning (Josh Brown kick) (7–80, 3:47) (Tied 14-14)
- CHI Marshall 3-yard pass from Cutler (Gould kick) (9–80, 5:11) (CHI 21-14)
- CHI Gould 40-yard FG (10–58, 3:32) (CHI 24-14)

**Third quarter**

- CHI Gould 52-yard FG (8–40, 3:37) (CHI 27-14)
- NYG Jacobs 1-yard run (Josh Brown kick) (9–91, 5:15) (CHI 27-21)

**Top passers**

- NYG – Eli Manning – 14/26, 239 YDS, TD, 3 INT
- CHI – Jay Cutler – 24/36, 262 YDS, 2 TD

**Top rushers**

- NYG – Brandon Jacobs – 22 CAR, 106 YDS, 2 TD
- CHI – Matt Forté – 19 CAR, 67 YDS

**Top receivers**

- NYG – Rueben Randle – 2 REC, 57 YDS, TD
- CHI – Brandon Marshall – 6 REC, 65 YDS, 2 TD

**Top tacklers**

- NYG – Jon Beason – 11 TKL, AST
- CHI – Major Wright – 11 TKL

The Giants fell to the Chicago Bears 27–21, and were 0–6 for the first time since 1976.

==== Week 7: vs. Minnesota Vikings ====
Week Seven: Minnesota Vikings at New York Giants – Game summary

Quarter	1	2	3	4	Total
Vikings	7	0	0	0	**7**
**Giants**	3	7	7	6	**23**

at MetLife Stadium, East Rutherford, New Jersey

- Date: October 21
- Game time: 8:40 p.m. EDT
- Game weather: 57 °F (13.9 °C), Partly Cloudy
- Game attendance: 79,314
- Referee: Tony Corrente
- TV announcers (ESPN): Mike Tirico, Jon Gruden and Lisa Salters
- Recap, Game book

Game information

**First quarter**

- NYG Josh Brown 35-yard FG (17–68, 9:36) (NYG 3-0)
- MIN Marcus Sherels 86-yard punt return (Blair Walsh kick) (MIN 7-3)

**Second quarter**

- NYG Randle 24-yard pass from Manning (Josh Brown kick) (7–82, 3:34) (NYG 10-7)

**Third quarter**

- NYG Hillis 1-yard run (Josh Brown kick) (2–3, 0:41) (NYG 17-7)

**Fourth quarter**

- NYG Josh Brown 23-yard FG (16–75, 8:31) (NYG 20-7)
- NYG Josh Brown 36-yard FG (4–0, 1:00) (NYG 23-7)

**Top passers**

- MIN – Josh Freeman – 20/53, 190 YDS, INT
- NYG – Eli Manning – 23/39, 200 YDS, TD

**Top rushers**

- MIN – Adrian Peterson – 13 CAR, 28 YDS
- NYG – Peyton Hillis – 18 CAR, 36 YDS, TD

**Top receivers**

- MIN – Greg Jennings – 4 REC, 41 YDS
- NYG – Victor Cruz – 5 REC, 50 YDS

**Top tacklers**

- MIN – Erin Henderson – 12 TKL, 2 AST, SK
- NYG – Prince Amukamara – 5 TKL; Jon Beason – 5 TKL, 4 AST; Antrel Rolle – 5 TKL, AST; Jacquian Williams – 5 TKL

==== Week 8: at Philadelphia Eagles ====
Week Eight: New York Giants at Philadelphia Eagles – Game summary

Quarter	1	2	3	4	Total
**Giants**	6	6	0	3	**15**
Eagles	0	0	0	7	**7**

at Lincoln Financial Field, Philadelphia, Pennsylvania

- Date: October 27
- Game time: 1:00 p.m. EDT
- Game weather: 56 °F (13.3 °C), Sunny
- Game attendance: 69,144
- Referee: Carl Cheffers
- TV announcers (Fox): Kenny Albert, Daryl Johnston and Tony Siragusa
- Recap, Game book

Game information

**First quarter**

- NYG Josh Brown 40-yard FG (9–57, 4:24) (NYG 3-0)
- NYG Josh Brown 44-yard FG (7–45, 3:04) (NYG 6-0)

**Second quarter**

- NYG Josh Brown 33-yard FG (12–48, 5:31) (NYG 9-0)
- NYG Josh Brown 46-yard FG (9–53, 5:08) (NYG 12-0)

**Fourth quarter**

- NYG Josh Brown 27-yard FG (9–32, 5:58) (NYG 15-0)
- PHI Najee Goode 2-yard fumble return (Henery kick) (NYG 15-7)

**Top passers**

- NYG – Eli Manning – 25/39, 246 YDS
- PHI – Matt Barkley – 17/26, 158 YDS, INT

**Top rushers**

- NYG – Peyton Hillis – 20 CAR, 70 YDS
- PHI – LeSean McCoy – 15 CAR, 48 YDS

**Top receivers**

- NYG – Victor Cruz – 7 REC, 86 YDS
- PHI – DeSean Jackson – 8 REC, 63 YDS

**Top tacklers**

- NYG – Terrell Thomas – 10 TKL, AST, SK
- PHI – Mychal Kendricks – 11 TKL, AST

Despite failing to reach the end zone and surrendering a late defensive score, the Giants held off the Eagles for their first road win of the season, ending an eight-game road losing streak. With the win, New York improved to 2–6 on the season. This would be New York's last road win over the Eagles until 2026.

==== Week 10: vs. Oakland Raiders ====
Week Ten: Oakland Raiders at New York Giants – Game summary

Quarter	1	2	3	4	Total
Raiders	10	7	3	0	**20**
**Giants**	7	7	7	3	**24**

at MetLife Stadium, East Rutherford, New Jersey

- Date: November 10
- Game time: 1:00 p.m. EST
- Game weather: 49 °F (9.4 °C), Cloudy
- Game attendance: 80,366
- Referee: Pete Morelli
- TV announcers (CBS): Ian Eagle and Dan Fouts
- Recap, Game book

Game information

**First quarter**

- OAK Pryor 1-yard run (Sebastian Janikowski kick) (2–5, 0:45) (OAK 7-0)
- NYG Cooper Taylor 21-yard return of blocked punt (Josh Brown kick) (Tied 7-7)
- OAK Janikowski 33-yard FG (4–6, 1:09) (OAK 10-7)

**Second quarter**

- NYG Randle 5-yard pass from Manning (Josh Brown kick) (11–90, 6:22) (NYG 14-10)
- OAK Tracy Porter 43-yard interception return (Janikowski kick) (OAK 17-14)

**Third quarter**

- OAK Janikowski 24-yard FG (14–74, 8:04) (OAK 20-14)
- NYG Andre Brown 1-yard run (Josh Brown kick) (2–5, 0:46) (NYG 21-20)

**Fourth quarter**

- NYG Josh Brown 23-yard FG (13–70, 6:56) (NYG 24-20)

**Top passers**

- OAK – Terrelle Pryor – 11/26, 122 YDS, INT
- NYG – Eli Manning – 12/22, 140 YDS, TD, INT

**Top rushers**

- OAK – Rashad Jennings – 20 CAR, 88 YDS
- NYG – Andre Brown – 30 CAR, 115 YDS, TD

**Top receivers**

- OAK – Denarius Moore – 3 REC, 45 YDS
- NYG – Rueben Randle – 3 REC, 50 YDS, TD

**Top tacklers**

- OAK – Sio Moore – 8 TKL, 2 AST, SK
- NYG – Antrel Rolle – 10 TKL, 2 AST, SK

==== Week 11: vs. Green Bay Packers ====
Week Eleven: Green Bay Packers at New York Giants – Game summary

Quarter	1	2	3	4	Total
Packers	0	6	0	7	**13**
**Giants**	7	3	10	7	**27**

at MetLife Stadium, East Rutherford, New Jersey

- Date: November 17
- Game time: 4:25 p.m. EST
- Game weather: 59 °F (15 °C), Mostly Cloudy
- Game attendance: 79,114
- Referee: Terry McAulay
- TV announcers (Fox): Kenny Albert, Daryl Johnston, and Tony Siragusa
- Recap, Game book

Game information

**First quarter**

- NYG Randle 26-yard pass from Manning (Josh Brown kick) (5–42, 2:57) (NYG 7-0)

**Second quarter**

- NYG Josh Brown 40-yard FG (11–56, 4:56) (NYG 10-0)
- GB Mason Crosby 24-yard FG (7–76, 3:42) (NYG 10-3)
- GB Crosby 57-yard FG (4–24, 0:43) (NYG 10-6)

**Third quarter**

- NYG Josh Brown 28-yard FG (5–40, 2:10) (NYG 13-6)
- NYG Jacobs 1-yard run (Josh Brown kick) (10–63, 6:07) (NYG 20-6)

**Fourth quarter**

- GB Lacy 4-yard run (Crosby kick) (5–83, 2:42) (NYG 20-13)
- NYG Pierre-Paul 24-yard interception return (Josh Brown kick) (NYG 27-13)

**Top passers**

- GB – Scott Tolzien – 24/34, 339 YDS, 3 INT
- NYG – Eli Manning – 25/35, 279 YDS, TD, INT

**Top rushers**

- GB – Eddie Lacy – 14 CAR, 27 YDS, TD
- NYG – Andre Brown – 18 CAR, 66 YDS

**Top receivers**

- GB – Jordy Nelson – 8 REC, 117 YDS
- NYG – Victor Cruz – 8 REC, 110 YDS

**Top tacklers**

- GB – Brad Jones – 11 TKL, 2 AST, SK
- NYG – Terrell Thomas – 7 TKL, AST

The game was originally scheduled for Sunday Night Football but was flexed to 4:25.

==== Week 12: vs. Dallas Cowboys ====
Week Twelve: Dallas Cowboys at New York Giants – Game summary

Quarter	1	2	3	4	Total
**Cowboys**	7	7	7	3	**24**
Giants	0	6	7	8	**21**

at MetLife Stadium, East Rutherford, New Jersey

- Date: November 24
- Game time: 4:25 p.m. EST
- Game weather: 25 °F (−3.9 °C), Windy
- Game attendance: 80,499
- Referee: Walt Anderson
- TV announcers (Fox): Joe Buck, Troy Aikman and Pam Oliver
- Recap, Game book

Game information

**First quarter**

- DAL Jeff Heath 50-yard fumble return (Bailey kick) (DAL 7-0)

**Second quarter**

- NYG Josh Brown 21-yard FG (10–74, 6:37) (DAL 7-3)
- DAL Witten 20-yard pass from Romo (Bailey kick) (5–80, 3:03) (DAL 14-3)
- NYG Josh Brown 23-yard FG (8–65, 4:19) (DAL 14-6)

**Third quarter**

- DAL Witten 2-yard pass from Romo (Bailey kick) (10–65, 5:41) (DAL 21-6)
- NYG Myers 27-yard pass from Manning (Josh Brown kick) (6–67, 2:21) (DAL 21-13)

**Fourth quarter**

- NYG Louis Murphy 4-yard pass from Manning (Andre Brown run) (8–58, 4:13) (Tied 21-21)
- DAL Bailey 35-yard FG (14–64, 4:45) (DAL 24-21)

**Top passers**

- DAL – Tony Romo – 23/38, 250 YDS, 2 TD, INT
- NYG – Eli Manning – 16/30, 174 YDS, 2 TD

**Top rushers**

- DAL – DeMarco Murray – 14 CAR, 86 YDS
- NYG – Andre Brown – 21 CAR, 127 YDS

**Top receivers**

- DAL – Dez Bryant – 9 REC, 102 YDS
- NYG – Rueben Randle – 3 REC, 64 YDS

**Top tacklers**

- DAL – Barry Church – 8 TKL, 5 AST; Ernie Sims – 8 TKL, 2 AST
- NYG – Prince Amukamara – 6 TKL; Antrel Rolle – 6 TKL

With the loss, the Giants were swept by the Cowboys for the first time since 2007.

==== Week 13: at Washington Redskins ====
Week Thirteen: New York Giants at Washington Redskins – Game summary

Quarter	1	2	3	4	Total
**Giants**	0	14	0	10	**24**
Redskins	7	7	3	0	**17**

at FedExField, Landover, Maryland

- Date: December 1
- Game time: 8:30 p.m. EST
- Game weather: 43 °F (6.1 °C), Cloudy
- Game attendance: 75,220
- Referee: Jeff Triplette
- TV announcers (NBC): Al Michaels, Cris Collinsworth and Michele Tafoya
- Recap, Game book

Game information

**First quarter**

- WAS Alfred Morris 1-yard run (Kai Forbath kick) (14–73, 7:06) (WAS 7-0)

**Second quarter**

- WAS Logan Paulsen 19-yard pass from Griffin (Forbath kick) (8–59, 4:02) (WAS 14-0)
- NYG Andre Brown 23-yard run (Josh Brown kick) (6–74, 2:59) (WAS 14-7)
- NYG Myers 22-yard pass from Manning (Josh Brown kick) (9–81, 2:59) (Tied 14-14)

**Third quarter**

- WAS Forbath 33-yard FG (4—3, 0:38) (WAS 17-14)

**Fourth quarter**

- NYG Andre Brown 1-yard run (Josh Brown kick) (4–46, 1:28) (NYG 21-17)
- NYG Josh Brown 39-yard FG (8–40, 3:57) (NYG 24-17)

**Top passers**

- NYG – Eli Manning – 22/28, 235 YDS, TD, INT
- WAS – Robert Griffin III – 24/32, 207 YDS, TD

**Top rushers**

- NYG – Peyton Hillis – 6 CAR, 45 YDS
- WAS – Robert Griffin III – 12 CAR, 88 YDS

**Top receivers**

- NYG – Victor Cruz – 6 REC, 80 YDS
- WAS – Pierre Garçon – 9 REC, 61 YDS

**Top tacklers**

- NYG – Jon Beason – 13 TKL, 4 AST
- WAS – DeAngelo Hall – 5 TKL, 2 AST

==== Week 14: at San Diego Chargers ====
Week Fourteen: New York Giants at San Diego Chargers – Game summary

Quarter	1	2	3	4	Total
Giants	0	0	7	7	**14**
**Chargers**	7	17	7	6	**37**

at Qualcomm Stadium, San Diego, California

- Date: December 8
- Game time: 4:25 p.m. EST/1:25 p.m. PST
- Game weather: 53 °F (11.7 °C), Sunny
- Game attendance: 65,132
- Referee: Ron Winter
- TV announcers (Fox): Kenny Albert, Daryl Johnston and Tony Siragusa
- Recap, Game book

Game information

**First quarter**

- SD Allen 43-yard pass from Rivers (Nick Novak kick) (3–50, 0:53) (SD 7-0)

**Second quarter**

- SD Novak 36-yard FG (15–76, 7:36) (SD 10-0)
- SD Allen 4-yard pass from Rivers (Novak kick) (11–67, 6:09) (SD 17-0)
- SD Danny Woodhead 6-yard pass from Rivers (Novak kick) (5–39, 2:16) (SD 24-0)

**Third quarter**

- NYG Hillis 1-yard run (Josh Brown kick) (7–18, 4:04) (SD 24-7)
- SD Mathews 1-yard run (Novak kick) (11–80, 5:39) (SD 31-7)

**Fourth quarter**

- NYG Myers 5-yard pass from Manning (Josh Brown kick) (11–86, 5:12) (SD 31-14)
- SD Novak 27-yard FG (11–75, 7:23) (SD 34-14)
- SD Novak 43-yard FG (7–18, 2:27) (SD 37-14)

**Top passers**

- NYG – Eli Manning – 20/32, 259 YDS, TD, 2 INT
- SD – Philip Rivers – 21/28, 249 YDS, 3 TD

**Top rushers**

- NYG – Andre Brown – 16 CAR, 81 YDS
- SD – Ryan Mathews – 29 CAR, 103 YDS, TD

**Top receivers**

- NYG – Hakeem Nicks – 5 REC, 135 YDS
- SD – Keenan Allen – 3 REC, 59 YDS, 2 TD

**Top tacklers**

- NYG – Terrell Thomas – 9 TKL
- SD – Marcus Gilchrist – 7 TKL, AST

With the loss, the Giants fell to 5–8, and were mathematically eliminated from playoff contention for the second straight season, thus rendering them unable to play Super Bowl XLVIII on their home turf.

==== Week 15: vs. Seattle Seahawks ====
Week Fifteen: Seattle Seahawks at New York Giants – Game summary

Quarter	1	2	3	4	Total
**Seahawks**	3	10	3	7	**23**
Giants	0	0	0	0	**0**

at MetLife Stadium, East Rutherford, New Jersey

- Date: December 15
- Game time: 1:00 p.m. EST
- Game weather: 36 °F (2.2 °C), Partly Sunny
- Game attendance: 79,691
- Referee: Bill Leavy
- TV announcers (Fox): Kevin Burkhardt, John Lynch and Erin Andrews
- Recap, Game book

Game information

**First quarter**

- SEA Steven Hauschka 49-yard FG (5–11, 2:00) (SEA 3-0)

**Second quarter**

- SEA Lynch 2-yard run (Hauschka kick) (7–62, 3:33) (SEA 10-0)
- SEA Hauschka 44-yard FG (10–40, 2:45) (SEA 13-0)

**Third quarter**

- SEA Hauschka 24-yard FG (9–39, 4:03) (SEA 16-0)

**Fourth quarter**

- SEA Doug Baldwin 12-yard pass from Wilson (Hauschka kick) (6–16, 2:40) (SEA 23-0)

**Top passers**

- SEA – Russell Wilson – 18/27, 206 YDS, TD, INT
- NYG – Eli Manning – 18/31, 156 YDS, 5 INT

**Top rushers**

- SEA – Russell Wilson – 8 CAR, 50 YDS
- NYG – Andre Brown – 11 CAR, 17 YDS

**Top receivers**

- SEA – Marshawn Lynch – 6 REC, 73 YDS
- NYG – Jerrel Jernigan – 7 REC, 67 YDS

**Top tacklers**

- SEA – Bobby Wagner – 8 TKL, 2 AST, 1.5 SK
- NYG – Will Hill – 7 TKL

Eli Manning threw a career high five interceptions during this game. This would be the second season in a row where the Giants were shutout by the top NFC seed in Week 15 (the Giants were shutout 34–0 by the Falcons in 2012).

==== Week 16: at Detroit Lions ====
Week Sixteen: New York Giants at Detroit Lions – Game summary

Quarter	1	2	3	4	OT	Total
**Giants**	3	10	0	7	3	**23**
Lions	0	3	9	8	0	**20**

at Ford Field, Detroit, Michigan

- Date: December 22
- Game time: 4:05 p.m. EST
- Game weather: Played indoors (dome stadium)
- Game attendance: 63,996
- Referee: Jerome Boger
- TV announcers (Fox): Kenny Albert, Daryl Johnston and Tony Siragusa
- Recap, Game book

Game information

**First quarter**

- NYG Josh Brown 41-yard FG (15–69, 5:42) (NYG 3-0)

**Second quarter**

- DET David Akers 37-yard FG (12–63, 6:11) (Tied 3-3)
- NYG Jernigan 20-yard pass from Manning (Josh Brown kick) (9–49, 5:21) (NYG 10-3)
- NYG Josh Brown 52-yard FG (5–23, 0:38) (NYG 13-3)

**Third quarter**

- DET Bell 1-yard run (Akers kick) (8–30, 4:10) (NYG 13-10)
- DET Manning sacked in end zone by Nick Fairley for a Safety (NYG 13-12)

**Fourth quarter**

- DET Theo Riddick 2-yard run (Stafford-Joseph Fauria pass) (9–63, 4:11) (DET 20-13)
- NYG Will Hill 38-yard interception return (J.Brown kick) (Tied 20-20)

**Overtime**

- NYG Josh Brown 45-yard FG (11–45, 5:12) (NYG 23-20)

**Top passers**

- NYG – Eli Manning – 23/42, 256 YDS, TD, INT
- DET – Matthew Stafford – 25/42, 222 YDS, 2 INT

**Top rushers**

- NYG – Andre Brown – 16 CAR, 40 YDS
- DET – Joique Bell – 20 CAR, 91 YDS, TD

**Top receivers**

- NYG – Jerrel Jernigan – 6 REC, 80 YDS, TD
- DET – Joique Bell – 10 REC, 63 YDS

**Top tacklers**

- NYG – Jon Beason – 6 TKL, 5 AST; Will Hill – 6 TKL, 5 AST
- DET – DeAndre Levy – 6 TKL, AST

With the win, the Giants placed the Lions out of post-season contention.

==== Week 17: vs. Washington Redskins ====
Week Seventeen: Washington Redskins at New York Giants – Game summary

Quarter	1	2	3	4	Total
Redskins	0	6	0	0	**6**
**Giants**	0	10	7	3	**20**

at MetLife Stadium, East Rutherford, New Jersey

- Date: December 29
- Game time: 1:00 p.m. EST
- Game weather: 40 °F (4.4 °C), Rain
- Game attendance: 80,177
- Referee: Bill Vinovich
- TV announcers (Fox): Dick Stockton, Ronde Barber and Kris Budden
- Recap, Game book

Game information

**Second quarter**

- WAS Kai Forbath 31-yard FG (4–5, 1:30) (WAS 3-0)
- NYG Jernigan 24-yard pass from Manning (Josh Brown kick) (6–75, 2:55) (NYG 7-3)
- NYG Josh Brown 34-yard FG (7–30, 2:00) (NYG 10-3)
- WAS Kai Forbath 49-yard FG (5–23, 0:44) (NYG 10-6)

**Third quarter**

- NYG Jernigan 49-yard run (Josh Brown kick) (1–49, 0:02) (NYG 17-6)

**Fourth quarter**

- NYG Josh Brown 38-yard FG (11–33, 7:06) (NYG 20-6)

**Top passers**

- WAS – Kirk Cousins – 19/49, 169 YDS, 2 INT
- NYG – Eli Manning – 10/24, 152 YDS, TD, INT

**Top rushers**

- WAS – Alfred Morris – 16 CAR, 62 YDS
- NYG – Jerrel Jernigan – 2 CAR, 57 YDS, TD

**Top receivers**

- WAS – Pierre Garçon – 6 REC, 56 YDS
- NYG – Jerrel Jernigan – 6 REC, 90 YDS, TD

**Top tacklers**

- WAS – Brandon Meriweather – 8 TKL
- NYG – Jon Beason – 8 TKL, AST

The Giants swept the Redskins for the first time since 2010.

== Standings ==
=== Division ===
NFC East
	W	L	T	PCT	DIV	CONF	PF	PA	STK
^{(3)} Philadelphia Eagles	10	6	0	.625	4–2	9–3	442	382	W2
Dallas Cowboys	8	8	0	.500	5–1	7–5	439	432	L1
New York Giants	7	9	0	.438	3–3	6–6	294	383	W2
Washington Redskins	3	13	0	.188	0–6	1–11	334	478	L8

=== Conference ===
NFC
#	Team	Division	W	L	T	PCT	DIV	CONF	SOS	SOV	STK
Division winners
1	Seattle Seahawks	West	13	3	0	.813	4–2	10–2	.490	.445	W1
2	Carolina Panthers	South	12	4	0	.750	5–1	9–3	.494	.451	W3
3	Philadelphia Eagles	East	10	6	0	.625	4–2	9–3	.453	.391	W2
4	Green Bay Packers	North	8	7	1	.531	3–2–1	6–5–1	.453	.371	W1
Wild cards
5	San Francisco 49ers	West	12	4	0	.750	5–1	9–3	.494	.414	W6
6	New Orleans Saints	South	11	5	0	.688	5–1	9–3	.516	.455	W1
Did not qualify for the postseason
7	Arizona Cardinals	West	10	6	0	.625	2–4	6–6	.531	.444	L1
8 (Note: Chicago defeated Dallas head-to-head (Week 14, 45–28).)	Chicago Bears	North	8	8	0	.500	2–4	4–8	.465	.469	L2
9	Dallas Cowboys	East	8	8	0	.500	5–1	7–5	.484	.363	L1
10 (Note: The NY Giants and Detroit finished with a better conference record than St. Louis.) (Note: The NY Giants defeated Detroit head-to-head (Week 16, 23–20 (OT)).)	New York Giants	East	7	9	0	.438	3–3	6–6	.520	.366	W2
11 (Note: Detroit finished with a better conference record than St. Louis.)	Detroit Lions	North	7	9	0	.438	4–2	6–6	.457	.402	L4
12	St. Louis Rams	West	7	9	0	.438	1–5	4–8	.551	.446	L1
13	Minnesota Vikings	North	5	10	1	.344	2–3–1	4–7–1	.512	.450	W1
14 (Note: Atlanta finished with a better conference record than Tampa Bay.)	Atlanta Falcons	South	4	12	0	.250	1–5	3–9	.553	.313	L2
15	Tampa Bay Buccaneers	South	4	12	0	.250	1–5	2–10	.574	.391	L3
16	Washington Redskins	East	3	13	0	.188	0–6	1–11	.516	.438	L8
Tiebreakers (Note: When breaking ties for three or more teams under the NFL's rules, they are first broken within divisions, then comparing only the highest-ranked remaining team from each division.)
