= 2013 Carolina Panthers season =

NFL team season

- Owner: Jerry Richardson
- General manager: Dave Gettleman
- Head coach: Ron Rivera
- Offensive coordinator: Mike Shula
- Defensive coordinator: Sean McDermott
- Home stadium: Bank of America Stadium

Results
- Record: 12–4
- Division place: 1st NFC South
- Playoffs: Lost Divisional Playoffs (vs. 49ers) 10–23
- All-Pros: Greg Hardy
- Pro Bowlers: Jordan Gross, LT; Cam Newton, QB; Ryan Kalil, C Mike Tolbert, FB; Greg Hardy, DE; Luke Kuechly, MLB; J. J. Jansen, LS

Uniform
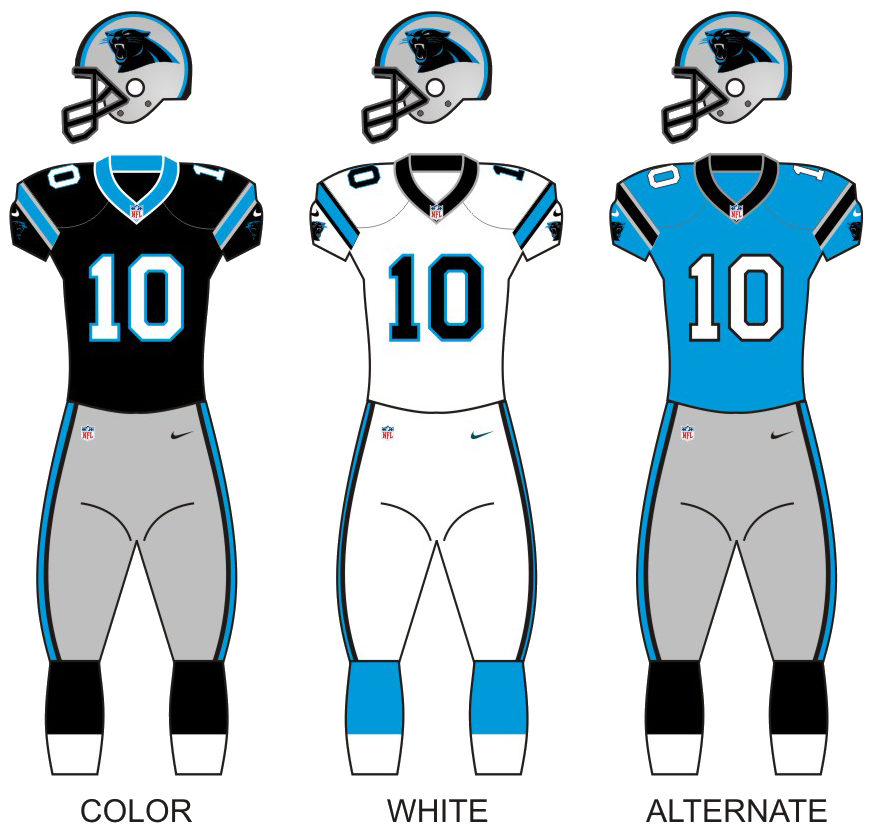

The 2013 season was the Carolina Panthers' 19th in the National Football League (NFL) and their third under head coach Ron Rivera. NFL.com ranked the Panthers' schedule as the strongest in the league, with opponents having a combined 2012 record of 138–116–2 and a winning percentage of .543.

After starting the season 1–3, the Panthers went 11–1 the rest of the way, including a then-record eight-game winning streak, securing their first winning season and playoff appearance since 2008, the first winning season under Rivera and the fifth in franchise history. During Week 12, they defeated the Miami Dolphins, also a franchise first for the Panthers. They also notched their third NFC South title, their first since 2008 and their fourth division title overall. This was the first of three consecutive NFC South titles for the Panthers. Their season ended in the divisional round of the playoffs with a 23–10 loss to the San Francisco 49ers.

== Draft ==
2013 Carolina Panthers draft
| Round | Pick | Player | Position | College | Notes |
| 1 | 14 | Star Lotulelei | DT | Utah | |
| 2 | 44 | Kawann Short * | DT | Purdue | |
| 4 | 108 | Edmund Kugbila | G | Valdosta State | |
| 5 | 148 | A.J. Klein | LB | Iowa State | |
| 6 | 182 | Kenjon Barner | RB | Oregon | |
Made roster † Pro Football Hall of Fame * Made at least one Pro Bowl during career

Note: The Panthers did not have selections in the third or seventh rounds. The team traded its third-round selection (74th overall) and a 2012 sixth-round selection to the San Francisco 49ers in exchange for the 49ers' 2012 fourth-round selection, as well as its seventh-round selection (219th overall) to the Oakland Raiders in exchange for wide receiver Louis Murphy.

== Staff ==
2013 Carolina Panthers staff
| Front office: Owner/founder – Jerry Richardson; President – Danny Morrison; General manager – Dave Gettleman; Director of football operations – Brandon Beane; Director of team administration – Rob Rogers; Football operations manager – Bryan Porter; Football operations assistant – Matt Allen; Football operations assistant – Mike Anderson; Director of pro scouting – Mark Koncz; Director of college scouting – Don Gregory; National scout – Jeff Morrow; National scout – Mike Szabo; Executive assistant to the head coach – Linda O'Hora; Head coaches: Head coach – Ron Rivera; Offensive coaches: Offensive coordinator – Mike Shula; Quarterbacks – Ken Dorsey; Running backs – Jim Skipper; Wide receivers – Ricky Proehl; Assistant wide receivers – Lance Taylor; Tight ends – Pete Hoener; Offensive line – John Matsko; Assistant offensive line – Ray Brown | Defensive coaches: Defensive coordinator – Sean McDermott; Defensive line – Eric Washington; Assistant defensive line – Sam Mills III; Linebackers – Al Holcomb; Defensive backs – Steve Wilks; Special teams coaches: Special teams coordinator – Richard Rodgers; Assistant special teams – Bruce DeHaven; Administrative assistant – Curtis Fuller; Strength and conditioning: Strength and conditioning – Joe Kenn; Assistant strength and conditioning – Jason Benguche |

== Final roster ==
2013 Carolina Panthers roster
| Quarterbacks (QB): 3 Derek Anderson; 1 Cam Newton; Running backs (RB): 25 Kenjon Barner; 47 Richie Brockel; 28 Jonathan Stewart; 35 Mike Tolbert FB; 34 DeAngelo Williams; Wide receivers (WR): 19 Ted Ginn Jr.; 87 Domenik Hixon; 12 Tavarres King; 11 Brandon LaFell; 15 Marvin McNutt; 89 Steve Smith; Tight ends (TE): 84 Ben Hartsock; 88 Greg Olsen; 86 Brandon Williams | Offensive linemen (OL): 77 Byron Bell T; 74 Travis Bond T; 78 Nate Chandler G; 64 Brian Folkerts C; 69 Jordan Gross T; 63 Geoff Hangartner T/G; 67 Ryan Kalil C; 75 Chris Scott G; 70 Travelle Wharton G; Defensive linemen (DL): 97 Mario Addison DE; 90 Frank Alexander DE; 91 Colin Cole DT; 92 Dwan Edwards DT; 76 Greg Hardy DE; 96 Wes Horton DE; 95 Charles Johnson DE; 98 Star Lotulelei DT; 99 Kawann Short DT | Linebackers (LB): 93 Chase Blackburn OLB; 55 Dan Connor MLB; 58 Thomas Davis OLB; 56 A. J. Klein OLB; 59 Luke Kuechly MLB; 57 Jordan Senn OLB; 54 Jason Williams OLB; Defensive backs (DB): 29 Drayton Florence CB; 42 Colin Jones FS; 38 Robert Lester SS; 27 Quintin Mikell SS; 21 Mike Mitchell FS; 41 Captain Munnerlyn CB; 24 Josh Norman CB; 22 Josh Thomas CB; 23 Melvin White CB; Special teams (ST): 9 Graham Gano K; 44 J. J. Jansen LS; 8 Brad Nortman P | Practice squad: 2 Brenton Bersin WR; 5 Matt Blanchard QB; 53 Ben Jacobs LB; 68 Michael Jasper G; 79 Andrew McDonald T; 32 De'Andre Presley CB; 60 Craig Roh DE; 36 Armond Smith RB; Reserve: 62 Jeff Byers C (IR); 73 Bruce Campbell T (IR); 7 Jimmy Clausen QB (IR); 31 James Dockery CB (IR); 61 Linden Gaydosh DT (IR); 30 Charles Godfrey FS (IR); 71 Edmund Kugbila G (IR); 81 Kealoha Pilares WR (IR); 66 Amini Silatolu G (IR); 17 R. J. Webb WR (IR); 65 Garry Williams T (IR); 39 Michael Zordich FB (IR); Rookies in italics 53 active, 12 reserve, 8 practice squad |

== Schedule ==
=== Preseason ===
| Week | Date | Opponent | Result | Record | Venue | Recap |
|---|---|---|---|---|---|---|
| 1 | August 9 | Chicago Bears | **W** 24–17 | 1–0 | Bank of America Stadium | Recap |
| 2 | August 15 | at Philadelphia Eagles | **L** 9–14 | 1–1 | Lincoln Financial Field | Recap |
| 3 | August 22 | at Baltimore Ravens | **W** 34–27 | 2–1 | M&T Bank Stadium | Recap |
| 4 | August 29 | Pittsburgh Steelers | **W** 25–10 | 3–1 | Bank of America Stadium | Recap |

=== Regular season ===
| Week | Date | Opponent | Result | Record | Venue | Recap |
|---|---|---|---|---|---|---|
| 1 | September 8 | Seattle Seahawks | **L** 7–12 | 0–1 | Bank of America Stadium | Recap |
| 2 | September 15 | at Buffalo Bills | **L** 23–24 | 0–2 | Ralph Wilson Stadium | Recap |
| 3 | September 22 | New York Giants | **W** 38–0 | 1–2 | Bank of America Stadium | Recap |
| 4 | Bye | | | | | |
| 5 | October 6 | at Arizona Cardinals | **L** 6–22 | 1–3 | University of Phoenix Stadium | Recap |
| 6 | October 13 | at Minnesota Vikings | **W** 35–10 | 2–3 | Mall of America Field | Recap |
| 7 | October 20 | St. Louis Rams | **W** 30–15 | 3–3 | Bank of America Stadium | Recap |
| 8 | October 24 | at **Tampa Bay Buccaneers** | **W** 31–13 | 4–3 | Raymond James Stadium | Recap |
| 9 | November 3 | **Atlanta Falcons** | **W** 34–10 | 5–3 | Bank of America Stadium | Recap |
| 10 | November 10 | at San Francisco 49ers | **W** 10–9 | 6–3 | Candlestick Park | Recap |
| 11 | November 18 | New England Patriots | **W** 24–20 | 7–3 | Bank of America Stadium | Recap |
| 12 | November 24 | at Miami Dolphins | **W** 20–16 | 8–3 | Sun Life Stadium | Recap |
| 13 | December 1 | **Tampa Bay Buccaneers** | **W** 27–6 | 9–3 | Bank of America Stadium | Recap |
| 14 | December 8 | at **New Orleans Saints** | **L** 13–31 | 9–4 | Mercedes-Benz Superdome | Recap |
| 15 | December 15 | New York Jets | **W** 30–20 | 10–4 | Bank of America Stadium | Recap |
| 16 | December 22 | **New Orleans Saints** | **W** 17–13 | 11–4 | Bank of America Stadium | Recap |
| 17 | December 29 | at **Atlanta Falcons** | **W** 21–20 | 12–4 | Georgia Dome | Recap |

Note: Intra-division opponents are in bold text.

== Game summaries ==
=== Regular season ===
==== Week 1: vs. Seattle Seahawks ====
Week One: Seattle Seahawks at Carolina Panthers – Game summary

| Quarter | 1 | 2 | 3 | 4 | Total |
|---|---|---|---|---|---|
| Seahawks | 0 | 3 | 3 | 6 | 12 |
| Panthers | 0 | 7 | 0 | 0 | 7 |

at Bank of America Stadium, Charlotte, North Carolina

- Date: September 8
- Game time: 1:00 p.m. EDT
- Game weather: 87 °F (31 °C), partly cloudy
- Game attendance: 73,294
- Referee: Jeff Triplette
- TV announcers (Fox): Chris Myers, Tim Ryan and Jennifer Hale
- Recap, Game book

Game information

First quarter

- No scoring plays

Second quarter

- SEA – Steven Hauschka 27-yard field goal, Seahawks 3–0. Drive: 16 plays, 74 yards, 8:47.
- CAR – Steve Smith 3-yard pass from Cam Newton (Graham Gano kick), Panthers 7–3. Drive: 11 plays, 80 yards, 6:23.

Third quarter

- SEA – Steven Hauschka 40-yard field goal, Panthers 7–6. Drive: 9 plays, 43 yards, 4:14.

Fourth quarter

- SEA – Jermaine Kearse 43-yard pass from Russell Wilson (pass failed), Seahawks 12–7. Drive: 6 plays, 74 yards, 2:45.

Top passers

- SEA – Russell Wilson – 25/33, 320 yards, TD
- CAR – Cam Newton – 16/23, 125 yards, TD

Top rushers

- SEA – Marshawn Lynch – 17 rushes, 43 yards
- CAR – DeAngelo Williams – 17 rushes, 86 yards

Top receivers

- SEA – Doug Baldwin – 7 receptions, 91 yards
- CAR – Greg Olsen – 5 receptions, 56 yards

The Panthers opened up the regular season at home in an NFC battle with the Seattle Seahawks. Seattle got on the board first with Steven Hauschka hitting a 27-yard field goal in the second quarter. The Panthers gained the lead when quarterback Cam Newton made a 3-yard touchdown pass to wide receiver Steve Smith with 3:13 left in the first half. The Seahawks cut the Panthers lead to one point when Hauschka put through a 40-yard field goal in the third quarter. The Seahawks continued to dominate the second half when quarterback Russell Wilson threw a 43-yard touchdown pass to wide receiver Jermaine Kearse in the fourth quarter with 10:13 remaining in the game. The Panthers were on the verge of scoring, however running back DeAngelo Williams fumbled the ball at the Seattle 8-yard line with 5:25 left in the game and the Seahawks recovered. Seattle went on to run out the rest of the clock and go to 1–0 while the Panthers fell to 0–1 for the fifth consecutive year. Also, the team dropped to 10–4 when Newton does not have a turnover.

==== Week 2: at Buffalo Bills ====
Week Two: Carolina Panthers at Buffalo Bills – Game summary

| Quarter | 1 | 2 | 3 | 4 | Total |
|---|---|---|---|---|---|
| Panthers | 0 | 7 | 7 | 9 | 23 |
| Bills | 0 | 3 | 11 | 10 | 24 |

at Ralph Wilson Stadium, Orchard Park, New York

- Date: September 15
- Game time: 1:00 p.m. EDT
- Game weather: 65 °F (18 °C), mostly cloudy
- Game attendance: 67,819
- Referee: Walt Coleman
- TV announcers (Fox): Dick Stockton, Ronde Barber and Kris Budden
- Recap, Game book

Game information

First quarter

- No scoring plays.

Second quarter

- BUF – Dan Carpenter 55-yard field goal, 10:41. Bills 3–0. Drive: 10 plays, 43 yards, 4:04.
- CAR – Greg Olsen 13-yard pass from Cam Newton (Graham Gano kick), 0:13. Panthers 7–3. Drive: 10 plays, 90 yards, 1:54.

Third quarter

- BUF – Dan Carpenter 20-yard field goal, 10:49. Panthers 7–6. Drive: 14 plays, 78 yards, 4:11.
- CAR – Ted Ginn Jr. 40-yard pass from Cam Newton (Graham Gano kick), 6:52. Panthers 14–6. Drive: 8 plays, 80 yards, 3:57.
- BUF – Fred Jackson 4-yard rushing touchdown (EJ Manuel–Robert Woods pass), 4:15. Tied 14–14. Drive: 8 plays, 80 yards, 2:37.

Fourth quarter

- CAR – Graham Gano 27-yard field goal, 12:44. Panthers 17–14. Drive: 7 plays, 7 yards, 3:15.
- CAR – Graham Gano 25-yard field goal, 8:41. Panthers 20–14. Drive: 7 plays, 19 yards, 3:33.
- BUF – Dan Carpenter 48-yard field goal, 7:13. Panthers 20–17. Drive: 5 plays, 50 yards, 1:28.
- CAR – Graham Gano 39-yard field goal, 1:38. Panthers 23–17. Drive: 12 plays, 59 yards, 5:35.
- BUF – Stevie Johnson 2-yard pass from EJ Manuel (Dan Carpenter kick), 0:02. Bills 24–23. Drive: 9 plays, 80 yards, 1:36.

Top passers

- CAR – Cam Newton – 21/38, 229 yards, 2 TD, INT
- BUF – EJ Manuel – 27/39, 296 yards, TD, INT

Top rushers

- CAR – DeAngelo Williams – 22 rushes, 85 yards
- BUF – C. J. Spiller – 16 rushes, 103 yards

Top receivers

- CAR – Greg Olsen – 7 receptions, 84 yards, TD
- BUF – Stevie Johnson – 8 receptions, 111 yards, TD

The Panthers came into Buffalo looking to recover from a close loss in Seattle the previous week. In the third quarter Cam Newton bombed a 40-yard touchdown pass to Ted Ginn, giving the Panthers a 14–6 lead. Fred Jackson then ran in a 4-yard touchdown to put the Bills behind 14–12. The Bills converted the two-point conversion, putting the score at 14–14. The Panthers stalled twice in the red zone, forcing them to kick field goals to make the score 20–14. After a Dan Carpenter 48-yard kick, the Panthers got the ball back, marched down the field, but were stuffed on 4th and 1 at the Bills' 22. The Panthers decided to kick the field goal to put them up 23–17. EJ Manuel and the Bills got the ball back and march down the field. With 20 seconds remaining in the game from the Panthers' 31, Manuel threw an interception, but it was called back due to Luke Kuechly, the linebacker, committing pass interference. With 2 seconds remaining from the Panthers' 2-yard line, Manuel hit wide receiver Stevie Johnson in the back of the end zone for the score. With the loss, the Panthers fell to 0–2, and 3–17 when Newton had at least a turnover.

==== Week 3: vs. New York Giants ====
Week Three: New York Giants at Carolina Panthers – Game summary

| Quarter | 1 | 2 | 3 | 4 | Total |
|---|---|---|---|---|---|
| Giants | 0 | 0 | 0 | 0 | 0 |
| Panthers | 7 | 10 | 14 | 7 | 38 |

at Bank of America Stadium, Charlotte, North Carolina

- Date: September 22
- Game time: 1:00 p.m. EDT
- Game weather: 75 °F (24 °C), sunny
- Game attendance: 73,748
- Referee: Mike Carey
- TV announcers (Fox): Thom Brennaman, Brian Billick and Laura Okmin
- Recap, Game book

Game information

First quarter

- CAR – Mike Tolbert 2-yard run (Graham Gano kick), 2:33. Panthers 7–0. Drive: 12 plays, 59 yards, 5:50.

Second quarter

- CAR – Graham Gano 53-yard field goal, 6:44. Panthers 10–0. Drive: 10 plays, 37 yards, 4:54.
- CAR – Brandon LaFell 16-yard pass from Cam Newton (Graham Gano kick), 0:12. Panthers 17–0. Drive: 13 plays, 65 yards, 3:33.

Third quarter

- CAR – Brandon LaFell 20-yard pass from Cam Newton (Graham Gano kick), 11:35. Panthers 24–0. Drive: 6 plays, 80 yards, 3:25.
- CAR – Cam Newton 3-yard run (Graham Gano kick), 6:58. Panthers 31–0. Drive: 7 plays, 38 yards, 3:52.

Fourth quarter

- CAR – Ted Ginn Jr. 47-yard pass from Cam Newton (Graham Gano kick), 13:30. Panthers 38–0. Drive: 6 plays, 87 yards, 3:07.

Top passers

- NYG – Eli Manning – 12/23, 119 yards, INT
- CAR – Cam Newton – 15/27, 223 yards, 3 TD, INT

Top rushers

- NYG – David Wilson – 11 rushes, 39 yards
- CAR – DeAngelo Williams – 23 rushes, 120 yards

Top receivers

- NYG – Brandon Myers – 3 receptions, 33 yards
- CAR – Ted Ginn Jr. – 3 receptions, 71 yards, TD

At 0–2, the Panthers came onto their home turf desperate for a win. The Panthers romped the Giants (0–3) 38–0 behind seven defensive sacks and the flashy play of offensive weapons like Cam Newton and DeAngelo Williams. This was the largest margin of victory in Panthers history and this gave Giants' head coach Tom Coughlin his largest margin of defeat in his history of coaching the Giants. With the win, the Panthers increased to 1–2 and 4–17 when Newton turns the ball over.

==== Week 5: at Arizona Cardinals ====
Week Five: Carolina Panthers at Arizona Cardinals – Game summary

| Quarter | 1 | 2 | 3 | 4 | Total |
|---|---|---|---|---|---|
| Panthers | 3 | 3 | 0 | 0 | 6 |
| Cardinals | 0 | 3 | 9 | 10 | 22 |

at University of Phoenix Stadium, Glendale, Arizona

- Date: October 6
- Game time: 4:05 p.m. EDT/1:05 p.m. Arizona time
- Game weather: Played indoors (retractable roof closed)
- Game attendance: 60,426
- Referee: John Parry
- TV announcers (Fox): Chris Myers, Tim Ryan and Jennifer Hale
- Recap, Game book

Game information

First quarter

- CAR – Graham Gano 22-yard field goal, 7:27. Panthers 3–0. Drive: 10 plays, 76 yards, 5:26.

Second quarter

- ARI – Jay Feely 42-yard field goal, 8:29. Tied 3–3. Drive: 6 plays, 22 yards, 2:38.
- CAR – Graham Gano 51-yard field goal, 0:00. Panthers 6–3. Drive: 5 plays, 47 yards, 0:32.

Third quarter

- ARI – Rashard Mendenhall 1-yard run (Jay Feely kick), 5:48. Cardinals 10–6. Drive: 10 plays, 85 yards, 5:32.
- ARI – Cam Newton sacked in endzone by Calais Campbell for a safety, 5:28. Cardinals 12–6.

'Fourth quarter

- ARI – Jay Feely 50-yard field goal, 3:38. Cardinals 15–6. Drive: 11 plays, 41 yards, 6:23.
- ARI – Jim Dray 7-yard pass from Carson Palmer (Jay Feely kick), 2:23. Cardinals 22–6. Drive: 3 plays, 9 yards, 0:15.

Top passers

- CAR – Cam Newton – 21/39, 308 yards, 3 INT
- ARI – Carson Palmer – 19/28, 175 yards, TD, 3 INT

Top rushers

- CAR – DeAngelo Williams – 12 rushes, 39 yards
- ARI – Andre Ellington – 7 rushes, 52 yards

Top receivers

- CAR – Greg Olsen – 5 receptions, 79 yards
- ARI – Michael Floyd – 5 receptions, 61 yards

With the loss, the Panthers dropped to 1–3. The team also dropped to 4–18 when Newton turns the ball over.

==== Week 6: at Minnesota Vikings ====
Week Six: Carolina Panthers at Minnesota Vikings – Game summary

| Quarter | 1 | 2 | 3 | 4 | Total |
|---|---|---|---|---|---|
| Panthers | 7 | 7 | 14 | 7 | 35 |
| Vikings | 0 | 3 | 0 | 7 | 10 |

at Mall of America Field at the Hubert H. Humphrey Metrodome, Minneapolis, Minnesota

- Date: October 13
- Game time: 1:00 p.m. EDT/12:00 p.m. CDT
- Game weather: Played indoors (dome stadium)
- Game attendance: 63,963
- Referee: Ron Winter
- TV announcers (Fox): Sam Rosen, Brian Billick and Laura Okmin
- Recap, Game book

Game information

First quarter

- CAR – Steve Smith Sr. 2-yard pass from Cam Newton (Graham Gano kick), 2:03. Panthers 7–0. Drive: 15 plays, 62 yards, 9:29.

Second quarter

- CAR – Mike Tolbert 10-yard pass from Cam Newton (Graham Gano kick), 3:43. Panthers 14–0. Drive: 14 plays, 82 yards, 6:34.
- MIN – Blair Walsh 22-yard field goal, 0:14. Panthers 14–3. Drive: 15 plays, 76 yards, 3:29.

Third quarter

- CAR – Brandon LaFell 79-yard pass from Cam Newton (Graham Gano kick), 13:56. Panthers 21–3. Drive: 3 plays, 86 yards, 1:04.
- CAR – Cam Newton 7-yard run (Graham Gano kick), 6:10. Panthers 28–3. Drive: 10 plays, 53 yards, 5:50.

Fourth quarter

- CAR – Mike Tolbert 1-yard run (Graham Gano kick), 7:40. Panthers 35–3. Drive: 5 plays, 21 yards, 3:02.
- MIN – Kyle Rudolph 23-yard pass from Matt Cassel (Blair Walsh kick), 1:00. Panthers 35–10. Drive: 11 plays, 89 yards, 2:38.

Top passers

- CAR – Cam Newton – 20/26, 242 yards, 3 TD
- MIN – Matt Cassel – 32/44, 241 yards, TD, 2 INT

Top rushers

- CAR – DeAngelo Williams – 17 rushes, 64 yards
- MIN – Adrian Peterson – 10 rushes, 62 yards

Top receivers

- CAR – Brandon LaFell – 4 receptions, 107 yards, TD
- MIN – Kyle Rudolph – 9 receptions, 97 yards

With the win, the Panthers improved to 2–3 and also 11–4 in games where Newton does not commit a turnover.

==== Week 7: vs. St. Louis Rams ====
Week Seven: St. Louis Rams at Carolina Panthers – Game summary

| Quarter | 1 | 2 | 3 | 4 | Total |
|---|---|---|---|---|---|
| Rams | 2 | 3 | 7 | 3 | 15 |
| Panthers | 7 | 10 | 10 | 3 | 30 |

at Bank of America Stadium, Charlotte, North Carolina

- Date: October 20
- Game time: 1:00 p.m. EDT
- Game weather: 68 °F (20 °C), sunny
- Game attendance: 72,686
- Referee: Bill Vinovich
- TV announcers (Fox): Dick Stockton, Brian Billick and Laura Okmin
- Recap, Game book

Game information

First quarter

- CAR – Captain Munnerlyn 45-yard interception return (Graham Gano kick), 14:39. Panthers 7–0.
- STL – Mike Tolbert tackled in endzone by Eugene Sims for a safety, 5:23. Panthers 7–2.

Second quarter

- CAR – Graham Gano 37-yard field goal, 14:12. Panthers 10–2. Drive: 9 plays, 44 yards, 4:30.
- STL – Greg Zuerlein 28-yard field goal, 5:25. Panthers 10–5. Drive: 15 plays, 70 yards, 8:47.
- CAR – Mike Tolbert 1-yard run (Graham Gano kick), 1:05. Panthers 17–5. Drive: 8 plays, 80 yards, 4:20.

Third quarter

- CAR – Graham Gano 31-yard field goal, 6:46. Panthers 20–5. Drive: 13 plays, 61 yards, 8:14.
- STL – Zac Stacy 4-yard pass from Sam Bradford (Greg Zuerlein kick), 5:22. Panthers 20–12. Drive: 3 plays, 80 yards, 1:24.
- CAR – Steve Smith Sr. 19-yard pass from Cam Newton (Graham Gano kick), 0:19. Panthers 27–12. Drive: 8 plays, 72 yards, 5:02.

Fourth quarter

- CAR – Graham Gano 50-yard field goal, 11:32. Panthers 30–12. Drive: 5 plays, 20 yards, 2:53.
- STL – Greg Zuerlein 42-yard field goal, 9:09. Panthers 30–15. Drive: 9 plays, 56 yards, 2:23.

Top passers

- STL – Sam Bradford – 21/30, 255 yards, TD, INT
- CAR – Cam Newton – 15/17, 204 yards, TD

Top rushers

- STL – Zac Stacy – 17 rushes, 53 yards
- CAR – DeAngelo Williams – 15 rushes, 40 yards

Top receivers

- STL – Brian Quick – 2 receptions, 97 yards
- CAR – Steve Smith Sr. – 5 receptions, 69 yards, TD

With the win, the Panthers improved to 3–3 and 12–4 when Newton doesn't have a turnover.

==== Week 8: at Tampa Bay Buccaneers ====
Week Eight: Carolina Panthers at Tampa Bay Buccaneers – Game summary

| Quarter | 1 | 2 | 3 | 4 | Total |
|---|---|---|---|---|---|
| Panthers | 7 | 7 | 7 | 10 | 31 |
| Buccaneers | 3 | 3 | 0 | 7 | 13 |

at Raymond James Stadium, Tampa, Florida

- Date: October 24
- Game time: 8:25 p.m. EDT
- Game weather: 70 °F (21 °C), cloudy
- Game attendance: 59,073
- Referee: Jerome Boger
- TV announcers (NFLN): Brad Nessler, Mike Mayock and Alex Flanagan
- Recap, Game book

Game information

First quarter

- CAR – Greg Olsen 1-yard pass from Cam Newton (Graham Gano kick), 4:44. Panthers 7–0. Drive: 15 plays, 70 yards, 8:52.
- TB – Rian Lindell 47-yard field goal, 1:24. Panthers 7–3. Drive: 8 plays, 51 yards, 3:20.

Second quarter

- CAR – DeAngelo Williams 12-yard run (Graham Gano kick), 12:42. Panthers 14–3. Drive: 6 plays, 80 yards, 3:42.
- TB – Rian Lindell 48-yard field goal, 4:03. Panthers 14–6. Drive: 10 plays, 43 yards, 4:49.

Third quarter

- CAR – Cam Newton 6-yard run (Graham Gano kick), 6:27. Panthers 21–6. Drive: 9 plays, 53 yards, 4:36.

Fourth quarter

- CAR – Mike Tolbert 3-yard pass from Cam Newton (Graham Gano kick), 14:55. Panthers 28–6. Drive: 4 plays, 29 yards, 2:01.
- CAR – Graham Gano 29-yard field goal, 6:14. Panthers 31–6. Drive: 4 plays, 5 yards, 1:37.
- TB – Tim Wright 10-yard pass from Mike Glennon (Rian Lindell kick), 2:53. Panthers 31–13. Drive: 11 plays, 81 yards, 3:21.

Top passers

- CAR – Cam Newton – 23/32, 221 yards, 2 TD
- TB – Mike Glennon – 30/51, 275 yards, TD

Top rushers

- CAR – Cam Newton – 11 rushes, 50 yards, TD
- TB – Mike James – 10 rushes, 39 yards

Top receivers

- CAR – Ted Ginn Jr. – 5 receptions, 80 yards
- TB – Vincent Jackson – 5 receptions, 79 yards

With the win, the Panthers improved to 4–3, and 13–4 when Newton does not turn the ball over.

==== Week 9: vs. Atlanta Falcons ====
Week Nine: Atlanta Falcons at Carolina Panthers – Game summary

| Quarter | 1 | 2 | 3 | 4 | Total |
|---|---|---|---|---|---|
| Falcons | 0 | 10 | 0 | 0 | 10 |
| Panthers | 7 | 7 | 3 | 17 | 34 |

at Bank of America Stadium, Charlotte, North Carolina

- Date: November 3
- Game time: 1:00 p.m. EST
- Game weather: 62 °F (17 °C), sunny
- Game attendance: 73,720
- Referee: Tony Corrente
- TV announcers (Fox): Thom Brennaman, Brian Billick and Laura Okmin
- Recap, Game book

Game information

First quarter

- CAR – Mike Tolbert 4-yard run (Graham Gano kick), 6:13. Panthers 7–0. Drive: 7 plays, 39 yards, 3:55.

Second quarter

- ATL – Matt Bryant 28-yard field goal, 14:09. Panthers 7–3. Drive: 14 plays, 70 yards, 7:04.
- CAR – Greg Olsen 14-yard pass from Cam Newton (Graham Gano kick), 4:14. Panthers 14–3. Drive: 6 plays, 34 yards, 3:42.
- ATL – Tony Gonzalez 17-yard pass from Matt Ryan (Matt Bryant kick), 1:55. Panthers 14–10. Drive: 6 plays, 80 yards, 2:19.

Third quarter

- CAR – Graham Gano 55-yard field goal, 12:00. Panthers 17–10. Drive: 8 plays, 43 yards, 3:00.

Fourth quarter

- CAR – Cam Newton 8-yard run (Graham Gano kick), 9:00. Panthers 24–10. Drive: 7 plays, 66 yards, 4:29.
- CAR – Drayton Florence 38-yard interception return (Graham Gano kick), 8:30. Panthers 31–10.
- CAR – Graham Gano 20-yard field goal, 1:13. Panthers 34–10. Drive: 10 plays, 61 yards, 5:25.

Top passers

- ATL – Matt Ryan – 20/27, 219 yards, TD, 3 INT
- CAR – Cam Newton – 23/37, 249 yards, TD, 2 INT

Top rushers

- ATL – Steven Jackson – 13 rushes, 57 yards
- CAR – Jonathan Stewart – 9 rushes, 43 yards

Top receivers

- ATL – Harry Douglas – 3 receptions, 82 yards
- CAR – Brandon LaFell – 6 receptions, 74 yards

For the first time in franchise history the Panthers scored 30 or more points in four consecutive games, routing NFC South rival Atlanta Falcons 34–10. With the win, Carolina increased to a 5–3 record. The team also improved to 5–18 when Newton turns the ball over.

==== Week 10: at San Francisco 49ers ====
Week Ten: Carolina Panthers at San Francisco 49ers – Game summary

| Quarter | 1 | 2 | 3 | 4 | Total |
|---|---|---|---|---|---|
| Panthers | 0 | 7 | 0 | 3 | 10 |
| 49ers | 3 | 6 | 0 | 0 | 9 |

at Candlestick Park, San Francisco, California

- Date: November 10
- Game time: 4:05 p.m. EST/1:05 p.m. PST
- Game attendance: 69,732
- Referee: Carl Cheffers
- TV announcers (Fox): Thom Brennaman, Brian Billick and Laura Okmin
- Recap, Game book

Game information

First quarter

- SF – Phil Dawson 52-yard field goal, 10:45. 49ers 3–0. Drive: 9 plays, 46 yards, 4:15.

Second quarter

- SF – Phil Dawson 43-yard field goal, 13:34. 49ers 6–0. Drive: 5 plays, 16 yards, 1:43.
- SF – Phil Dawson 25-yard field goal, 6:16. 49ers 9–0. Drive: 5 plays, 17 yards, 2:42.
- CAR – DeAngelo Williams 27-yard run (Graham Gano kick), 1:52. 49ers 9–7. Drive: 8 plays, 80 yards, 4:24.

Third quarter

- No scoring plays.

Fourth quarter

- CAR – Graham Gano 53-yard field goal, 10:05. Panthers 10–9. Drive: 7 plays, 9 yards, 3:30.

Top passers

- CAR – Cam Newton – 16/32, 169 yards, INT
- SF – Colin Kaepernick – 11/22, 91 yards, INT

Top rushers

- CAR – DeAngelo Williams – 8 rushes, 46 yards, TD
- SF – Frank Gore – 16 rushes, 82 yards

Top receivers

- CAR – Steve Smith Sr. – 6 receptions, 63 yards
- SF – Mario Manningham – 3 receptions, 30 yards

Putting two of the NFL's best defenses against each other, the game indeed proved to be a defensive battle. The reigning NFC champions San Francisco, coming off a bye, only managed three field goals, partly due to the absence of start wide receiver Michael Crabtree and an early injury to tight end Vernon Davis. The 49ers received the opening kickoff and drove to the Carolina 33, where, on 3rd-and-2, Frank Gore was tackled for a 1-yard loss. Phil Dawson kicked a 52-yard field goal for the early 3–0 lead. Punts filled the rest of the quarter, with less than a minute left in the first quarter, Drayton Florence muffed the punt with Eric Reid recovering for San Francisco. The 49ers converted that into a 43-yard field goal for a 6–0 lead. After both teams swapped punts, Cam Newton was intercepted by Tramaine Brock at the 49ers 35 who returned it 41 yards to the Panthers 24. The 49ers drove to the Panthers 7 and Dawson kicked his third field goal, connecting from 25 yards. The Panthers finally responded on their next drive, storming 80 yards in just 8 plays with DeAngelo Williams bursting through for a 27-yard touchdown run, trimming the score to 9–7 at halftime. On the Panthers second drive of half they drove, 59 yards taking 5:44 off the clock, but Graham Gano missed a 48-yard field goal. The 49ers responded by driving to the Panthers 39, but Kendall Hunter was stripped by linebacker Thomas Davis and Quintin Mikell recovered for Carolina. After both teams swapped punts again, Gano drilled a 53-yard field goal for a 10–9 Panthers lead, their first of the game. After both teams punted on their next two drives, Drayton Florence made up for his earlier mistake with an interception with 0:37 left to seal the 10–9 Carolina statement victory. The Panthers snapped the 49ers' five-game winning streak, extended their own winning streak to five, and further increased their record to 6–3. Also, the team's record when Newton commits at least one turnover increased to 6–18.

==== Week 11: vs. New England Patriots ====
Week Eleven: New England Patriots at Carolina Panthers – Game summary

| Quarter | 1 | 2 | 3 | 4 | Total |
|---|---|---|---|---|---|
| Patriots | 0 | 3 | 7 | 10 | 20 |
| Panthers | 7 | 3 | 7 | 7 | 24 |

at Bank of America Stadium, Charlotte, North Carolina

- Date: November 18
- Game time: 8:40 p.m. EST
- Game weather: 59 °F (15 °C), cloudy
- Game attendance: 74,225
- Referee: Clete Blakeman
- TV announcers (ESPN): Mike Tirico, Jon Gruden and Lisa Salters
- Recap, Game book

Game information

First quarter

- CAR – Brandon LaFell 9-yard pass from Cam Newton (Graham Gano kick), 2:44. Panthers 7–0. Drive: 9 plays, 90 yards, 5:03.

Second quarter

- CAR – Graham Gano 43-yard field goal, 5:02. Panthers 10–0. Drive: 12 plays, 62 yards, 6:01.
- NE – Stephen Gostkowski 42-yard field goal, 1:09. Panthers 10–3. Drive: 9 plays, 56 yards, 3:53.

Third quarter

- NE – Rob Gronkowski 9-yard pass from Tom Brady (Stephen Gostkowski kick), 10:31. Tied 10–10. Drive: 8 plays, 80 yards, 4:29.
- CAR – Greg Olsen 15-yard pass from Cam Newton (Graham Gano kick), 2:10. Panthers 17–10. Drive: 13 plays, 81 yards, 8:21.

Fourth quarter

- NE – Stevan Ridley 1-yard run (Stephen Gostkowski kick), 12:33. Tied 17–17. Drive: 9 plays, 80 yards, 4:37.
- NE – Stephen Gostkowski 26-yard field goal, 6:32. Patriots 20–17. Drive: 9 plays, 31 yards, 4:21.
- CAR – Ted Ginn Jr. 25-yard pass from Cam Newton (Graham Gano kick), 0:59. Panthers 24–20. Drive: 13 plays, 83 yards, 5:33.

Top passers

- NE – Tom Brady – 29/40, 296 yards, TD, INT
- CAR – Cam Newton – 19/28, 209 yards, 3 TD

Top rushers

- NE – LeGarrette Blount – 10 rushes, 49 yards
- CAR – Cam Newton – 7 rushes, 62 yards

Top receivers

- NE – Shane Vereen – 8 receptions, 65 yards
- CAR – Steve Smith Sr. – 4 receptions, 62 yards

With Monday Night Football back in Charlotte for the first time since 2008, it pitted the Panthers against the 7–2 New England Patriots, who were coming back from a bye. Down 17–20 with less than a minute left, Panthers quarterback Cam Newton threw a 25-yard touchdown to wide receiver Ted Ginn Jr., bringing Carolina up 24–20. The Patriots received the ball back, and with only three seconds remaining, Patriots quarterback Tom Brady was intercepted by Panthers safety Robert Lester in the endzone. However, a flag was thrown by back judge Terrence Miles just after the ball was intercepted because Patriots tight end Rob Gronkowski, the intended target, was wrapped up by Panthers linebacker Luke Kuechly. The officials initially called pass interference on Kuechly. With no time left, this would have resulted in an untimed first-and-goal from the one-yard line. However, after the officials talked it over, they picked up the flag and ruled that the pass was uncatchable due to it being underthrown, and the game ended in a Panthers win. The prime time victory, before one of the largest crowds in franchise and Bank of America Stadium history, extended the Panthers' winning streak to six, increased their record to 7–3 and improved to 14–4 when Newton does not turn the ball over. Both teams ended the game with identical records of 7–3.

==== Week 12: at Miami Dolphins ====
Week Twelve: Carolina Panthers at Miami Dolphins – Game summary

| Quarter | 1 | 2 | 3 | 4 | Total |
|---|---|---|---|---|---|
| Panthers | 3 | 3 | 7 | 7 | 20 |
| Dolphins | 7 | 9 | 0 | 0 | 16 |

at Sun Life Stadium, Miami Gardens, Florida

- Date: November 24
- Game time: 1:00 p.m. EST
- Game weather: 82 °F (28 °C), cloudy
- Game attendance: 60,156
- Referee: Scott Green
- TV announcers (Fox): Chris Myers, Tim Ryan and Jennifer Hale
- Recap, Game book

Game information

First quarter

- CAR – Graham Gano 52-yard field goal, 6:58. Panthers 3–0. Drive: 5 plays, 8 yards, 2:15.
- MIA – Mike Wallace 53-yard pass from Ryan Tannehill (Caleb Sturgis kick), 5:39. Dolphins 7–3. Drive: 3 plays, 77 yards, 1:19.

Second quarter

- MIA – Caleb Sturgis 32-yard field goal, 12:34. Dolphins 10–3. Drive: 5 plays, 65 yards, 2:14.
- MIA – Caleb Sturgis 47-yard field goal, 2:13. Dolphins 13–3. Drive: 5 plays, 28 yards, 2:10.
- MIA – Caleb Sturgis 23-yard field goal, 1:01. Dolphins 16–3. Drive: 4 plays, 6 yards, 1:00.
- CAR – Graham Gano 46-yard field goal, 0:00. Dolphins 16–6. Drive: 8 plays, 52 yards, 1:01.

Third quarter

- CAR – Cam Newton 5-yard run (Graham Gano kick), 8:08. Dolphins 16–13. Drive: 14 plays, 83 yards, 6:52.

Fourth quarter

- CAR – Greg Olsen 1-yard pass from Cam Newton (Graham Gano kick), 0:43. Panthers 20–16. Drive: 12 plays, 80 yards, 3:30.

Top passers

- CAR – Cam Newton – 19/38 yards, 174 yards, TD, INT
- MIA – Ryan Tannehill – 28/42, 310 yards, TD, INT

Top rushers

- CAR – Cam Newton – 7 rushes, 51 yards, TD
- MIA – Ryan Tannehill – 4 rushes, 36 yards

Top receivers

- CAR – Steve Smith Sr. – 5 receptions, 69 yards
- MIA – Mike Wallace – 5 receptions, 127 yards, TD

For the first time during the season, the Panthers allowed a touchdown drive in the first quarter, and were down 16–6 at halftime to the 5–5 Miami Dolphins. However, Carolina came back in the second half and ultimately held the Dolphins scoreless. Trailing 13–16 with two minutes remaining, quarterback Cam Newton converted a fourth-and-10 from the Panthers' own 20 with a completion to wide receiver Steve Smith Sr., and a touchdown pass to tight end Greg Olsen with 43 seconds left won the game for the Panthers, 20–16. Carolina extended their winning streak to seven (tying the franchise record), extended their record to 8–3 and also improved 7–18 when Newton turns the ball over. It was also the first time in their franchise history the Panthers defeated the Dolphins.

==== Week 13: vs. Tampa Bay Buccaneers ====
Week Thirteen: Tampa Bay Buccaneers at Carolina Panthers – Game summary

| Quarter | 1 | 2 | 3 | 4 | Total |
|---|---|---|---|---|---|
| Buccaneers | 6 | 0 | 0 | 0 | 6 |
| Panthers | 7 | 10 | 7 | 3 | 27 |

at Bank of America Stadium, Charlotte, North Carolina

- Date: December 1
- Game time: 1:00 p.m. EST
- Game weather: 56 °F (13 °C), partly cloudy
- Game attendance: 72,795
- Referee: Ron Winter
- TV announcers (Fox): Chris Myers, Tim Ryan and Jennifer Hale
- Recap, Game book

Game information

First quarter

- TB – Rian Lindell 27-yard field goal, 9:14. Buccaneers 3–0. Drive: 8 plays, 59 yards, 4:27.
- CAR – Brandon LaFell 16-yard pass from Cam Newton (Graham Gano kick), 6:15. Panthers 7–3. Drive: 5 plays, 83 yards, 3:02.
- TB – Rian Lindell 53-yard field goal, 2:19. Panthers 7–6. Drive: 4 plays, −3 yards, 2:26.

Second quarter

- CAR – Graham Gano 23-yard field goal, 6:26. Panthers 10–6. Drive: 14 plays, 76 yards, 6:05.
- CAR – Cam Newton 1-yard run (Graham Gano kick), 0:30. Panthers 17–6. Drive: 7 plays, 49 yards, 3:45.

Third quarter

- CAR – Ted Ginn Jr. 36-yard pass from Cam Newton (Graham Gano kick), 10:58. Panthers 24–6. Drive: 4 plays, 78 yards, 2:10.

Fourth quarter

- CAR – Graham Gano 22-yard field goal, 6:43. Panthers 27–6. Drive: 13 plays, 66 yards, 8:45.

Top passers

- TB – Mike Glennon – 14/21, 180 yards, INT
- CAR – Cam Newton – 18/29, 263 yards, 2 TD, 2 INT

Top rushers

- TB – Bobby Rainey – 17 rushes, 63 yards
- CAR – Cam Newton – 5 rushes, 68 yards, TD

Top receivers

- TB – Vincent Jackson – 3 receptions, 75 yards
- CAR – Greg Olsen – 5 receptions, 85 yards

Top tacklers

- TB – Mason Foster – 5 tackles, 6 assists
- CAR – Luke Kuechly – 4 tackles, 5 assists

With the win, the Panthers broke their franchise record winning their 8th straight game improving to 9–3 in the process giving the team their first winning season since 2008 and also improving to 8–18 when Newton turns the ball over.

==== Week 14: at New Orleans Saints ====
Week Fourteen: Carolina Panthers at New Orleans Saints – Game summary

| Quarter | 1 | 2 | 3 | 4 | Total |
|---|---|---|---|---|---|
| Panthers | 6 | 0 | 0 | 7 | 13 |
| Saints | 0 | 21 | 3 | 7 | 31 |

at Mercedes-Benz Superdome, New Orleans, Louisiana

- Date: December 8
- Game time: 8:30 p.m. EST/7:30 p.m. CST
- Game weather: Played indoors (dome stadium)
- Game attendance: 73,089
- Referee: Walt Anderson
- TV announcers (NBC): Al Michaels, Cris Collinsworth and Michele Tafoya
- Recap, Game book

Game information

First quarter

- CAR – Graham Gano 45-yard field goal, 8:42. Panthers 3–0. Drive: 13 plays, 53 yards, 6:18.
- CAR – Graham Gano 24-yard field goal, 1:56. Panthers 6–0. Drive: 9 plays, 26 yards, 5:12.

Second quarter

- NO – Marques Colston 6-yard pass from Drew Brees (Garrett Hartley kick), 13:35. Saints 7–6. Drive: 9 plays, 80 yards, 3:21.
- NO – Marques Colston 15-yard pass from Drew Brees (Garrett Hartley kick), 2:44. Saints 14–6. Drive: 11 plays, 86 yards, 5:44.
- NO – Jimmy Graham 5-yard pass from Drew Brees (Garrett Hartley kick), 0:18. Saints 21–6. Drive: 7 plays, 76 yards, 1:43.

Third quarter

- NO – Garrett Hartley 19-yard field goal, 4:18. Saints 24–6. Drive: 13 plays, 60 yards, 6:01.

Fourth quarter

- NO – Jimmy Graham 8-yard pass from Drew Brees (Garrett Hartley kick), 9:52. Saints 31–6. Drive: 8 plays, 58 yards, 3:46.
- CAR – Steve Smith Sr. 17-yard pass from Cam Newton (Graham Gano kick), 5:15. Saints 31–13. Drive: 11 plays, 61 yards, 4:37.

Top passers

- CAR – Cam Newton – 22/34, 160 yards, TD
- NO – Drew Brees – 30/42, 313 yards, 4 TD

Top rushers

- CAR – DeAngelo Williams – 13 rushes, 52 yards
- NO – Darren Sproles – 1 rush, 38 yards

Top receivers

- CAR – Steve Smith Sr. – 6 receptions, 49 yards, TD
- NO – Marques Colston – 9 receptions, 125 yards, 2 TD

With the loss, the Panthers fell to 2nd place in the NFC South sitting at 9–4 as they also dropped to 14–5 when Newton doesn't turn the ball over.

==== Week 15: vs. New York Jets ====
Week Fifteen: New York Jets at Carolina Panthers – Game summary

| Quarter | 1 | 2 | 3 | 4 | Total |
|---|---|---|---|---|---|
| Jets | 3 | 3 | 7 | 7 | 20 |
| Panthers | 3 | 13 | 0 | 14 | 30 |

at Bank of America Stadium, Charlotte, North Carolina

- Date: December 15
- Game time: 4:05 p.m. EST
- Game weather: 54 °F (12 °C), sunny
- Game attendance: 73,251
- Referee: Terry McAulay
- TV announcers (CBS): Greg Gumbel and Dan Dierdorf
- Recap, Game book

Game information

First quarter

- CAR – Graham Gano 35-yard field goal, 4:39. Panthers 3–0. Drive: 9 plays, 50 yards, 4:37.
- NYJ – Nick Folk 50-yard field goal, 0:00. Tied 3–3. Drive: 10 plays, 44 yards, 4:39.

Second quarter

- CAR – Graham Gano 22-yard field goal, 6:46. Panthers 6–3. Drive: 15 plays, 85 yards, 8:14.
- NYJ – Nick Folk 33-yard field goal, 3:49. Tied 6–6. Drive: 9 plays, 65 yards, 2:57.
- CAR – DeAngelo Williams 72-yard pass from Cam Newton (Graham Gano kick), 3:29. Panthers 13–6. Drive: 1 play, 72 yards, 0:20.
- CAR – Graham Gano 40-yard field goal, 0:08. Panthers 16–6. Drive: 6 plays, 34 yards, 2:00.

Third quarter

- NYJ – Sheldon Richardson 1-yard run (Nick Folk kick), 3:04. Panthers 16–13. Drive: 9 plays, 86 yards, 4:46.

Fourth quarter

- CAR – Mike Tolbert 1-yard run (Graham Gano kick), 11:05. Panthers 23–13. Drive: 4 plays, 14 yards, 1:45.
- CAR – Captain Munnerlyn 41-yard interception return (Graham Gano kick), 8:17. Panthers 30–13.
- NYJ – Jeff Cumberland 8-yard pass from Geno Smith (Nick Folk kick), 3:50. Panthers 30–20. Drive: 12 plays, 72 yards, 4:27.

Top passers

- NYJ – Geno Smith – 15/28, 167 yards, TD, INT
- CAR – Cam Newton – 16/24, 273 yards, TD

Top rushers

- NYJ – Chris Ivory – 11 rushes, 66 yards
- CAR – DeAngelo Williams – 15 rushes, 81 yards

Top receivers

- NYJ – Jeff Cumberland – 4 receptions, 50 yards, TD
- CAR – DeAngelo Williams – 3 receptions, 87 yards, TD

With the win, the Panthers improved to 10–4 and also came out to 15–5 when Newton doesn't turn the ball over.

==== Week 16: vs. New Orleans Saints ====
Week Sixteen: New Orleans Saints at Carolina Panthers – Game summary

| Quarter | 1 | 2 | 3 | 4 | Total |
|---|---|---|---|---|---|
| Saints | 0 | 6 | 0 | 7 | 13 |
| Panthers | 0 | 7 | 3 | 7 | 17 |

at Bank of America Stadium, Charlotte, North Carolina

- Date: December 22
- Game time: 1:00 p.m. EST
- Game weather: 72 °F (22 °C), rainy
- Game attendance: 73,825
- Referee: Gene Steratore
- TV announcers (Fox): Joe Buck, Troy Aikman and Pam Oliver
- Recap, Game book

Game information

First quarter

- No scoring plays.

Second quarter

- NO – Shayne Graham 40-yard field goal, 10:49. Saints 3–0. Drive: 8 plays, 45 yards, 4:22.
- NO – Shayne Graham 24-yard field goal, 7:22. Saints 6–0. Drive: 7 plays, 46 yards, 3:27.
- CAR – DeAngelo Williams 43-yard run (Graham Gano kick), 1:45. Panthers 7–6. Drive: 1 play, 43 yards, 0:09.

Third quarter

- CAR – Graham Gano 40-yard field goal, 7:21. Panthers 10–6. Drive: 7 plays, 44 yards, 3:33.

Fourth quarter

- NO – Jimmy Graham 5-yard pass from Drew Brees (Shayne Graham kick), 6:37. Saints 13–10. Drive: 11 plays, 97 yards, 5:59.
- CAR – Domenik Hixon 14-yard pass from Cam Newton (Graham Gano kick), 0:23. Panthers 17–13. Drive: 5 plays, 65 yards, 0:32.

Top passers

- NO – Drew Brees – 30/44, 281 yards, TD, 2 INT
- CAR – Cam Newton – 13/22, 181 yards, TD, INT

Top rushers

- NO – Mark Ingram – 13 rushes, 83 yards
- CAR – DeAngelo Williams – 12 rushes, 67 yards, TD

Top receivers

- NO – Jimmy Graham – 5 receptions, 73 yards, TD
- CAR – Ted Ginn Jr. – 2 receptions, 66 yards

The Panthers came into the game hoping to avenge their loss to the Saints two weeks prior, with the winner taking first place in the NFC South. In the second quarter, a strong rain blanketed the stadium, reminiscent of a similar storm in 2011 against Jacksonville. New Orleans scored late to go up 13–10 with less than two minutes to play. Cam Newton led the offense down the field and into the red zone on the following possession. With under a minute to play, Newton threw the game-winning touchdown pass to receiver Domenik Hixon, who was replacing an injured Steve Smith Sr. It was later reported the stadium's press box shook when Hixon caught the touchdown. Carolina's defense was able to prevent the Saints from completing a last-second Hail Mary. With the win, the Panthers clinched a playoff spot and improved to 11–4. The team also improved to 9–18 when Newton turns the ball over.

==== Week 17: at Atlanta Falcons ====
Week Seventeen: Carolina Panthers at Atlanta Falcons – Game summary

| Quarter | 1 | 2 | 3 | 4 | Total |
|---|---|---|---|---|---|
| Panthers | 0 | 14 | 7 | 0 | 21 |
| Falcons | 7 | 3 | 7 | 3 | 20 |

at Georgia Dome, Atlanta, Georgia

- Date: December 29
- Game time: 1:00 p.m. EST
- Game weather: Played indoors (dome stadium)
- Game attendance: 70,427
- Referee: John Parry
- TV announcers (Fox): Kevin Burkhardt, John Lynch and Erin Andrews
- Recap, Game book

Game information

First quarter

- ATL – Jason Snelling 9-yard pass from Matt Ryan (Matt Bryant kick), 8:43. Falcons 7–0. Drive: 11 plays, 80 yards, 6:17.

Second quarter

- ATL – Matt Bryant 42-yard field goal, 10:00. Falcons 10–0. Drive: 9 plays, 31 yards, 3:08.
- CAR – Melvin White 8-yard interception return (Graham Gano kick), 7:57. Falcons 10–7.
- CAR – Ted Ginn Jr. 3-yard pass from Cam Newton (Graham Gano kick), 0:19. Panthers 14–10. Drive: 13 plays, 96 yards, 3:58.

Third quarter

- ATL – Roddy White 39-yard pass from Matt Ryan (Matt Bryant kick), 9:50. Falcons 17–14. Drive: 5 plays, 84 yards, 2:49.
- CAR – Greg Olsen 7-yard pass from Cam Newton (Graham Gano kick), 4:20. Panthers 21–17. Drive: 10 plays, 76 yards, 5:30.

Fourth quarter

- ATL – Matt Bryant 37-yard field goal, 7:10. Panthers 21–20. Drive: 17 plays, 71 yards, 8:33.

Top passers

- CAR – Cam Newton – 15/27, 149 yards, 2 TD, INT
- ATL – Matt Ryan – 28/40, 280 yards, 2 TD, INT

Top rushers

- CAR – Cam Newton – 12 rushes, 72 yards
- ATL – Steven Jackson – 13 rushes, 41 yards

Top receivers

- CAR – DeAngelo Williams – 2 receptions, 75 yards
- ATL – Roddy White – 8 receptions, 91 yards, TD

Despite sacking Matt Ryan nine times—a single-game franchise record—the Panthers were not assured of a win until the final seconds. With 31 seconds to go and trailing 21–20, the Falcons were driving in hopes of setting up a game-winning field goal. However, center Joe Hawley snapped the ball before Ryan was ready. The ball sailed back 16 yards to the Atlanta 27. Hawley later said that he was distracted by the noise from a large number of Panther fans who made the five-hour drive to Atlanta, and thought Ryan was calling for the ball. With the win, the Panthers clinched the NFC South, the #2 seed and a first-round bye, finishing 12–4 in the progress while going 10–18 when Newton turned the ball over. They swept the Falcons for the first time since 2005.

This was the last time the Panthers swept the Falcons until 2025.

== Standings ==
=== Division ===
NFC South
| | W | L | T | PCT | DIV | CONF | PF | PA | STK |
|---|---|---|---|---|---|---|---|---|---|
| ^{(2)} Carolina Panthers | 12 | 4 | 0 | .750 | 5–1 | 9–3 | 366 | 241 | W3 |
| ^{(6)} New Orleans Saints | 11 | 5 | 0 | .688 | 5–1 | 9–3 | 414 | 304 | W1 |
| Atlanta Falcons | 4 | 12 | 0 | .250 | 1–5 | 3–9 | 353 | 443 | L2 |
| Tampa Bay Buccaneers | 4 | 12 | 0 | .250 | 1–5 | 2–10 | 288 | 389 | L3 |

=== Conference ===
NFC
| # | Team | Division | W | L | T | PCT | DIV | CONF | SOS | SOV | STK |
|---|---|---|---|---|---|---|---|---|---|---|---|
Division winners
| 1 | Seattle Seahawks | West | 13 | 3 | 0 | .813 | 4–2 | 10–2 | .490 | .445 | W1 |
| 2 | Carolina Panthers | South | 12 | 4 | 0 | .750 | 5–1 | 9–3 | .494 | .451 | W3 |
| 3 | Philadelphia Eagles | East | 10 | 6 | 0 | .625 | 4–2 | 9–3 | .453 | .391 | W2 |
| 4 | Green Bay Packers | North | 8 | 7 | 1 | .531 | 3–2–1 | 6–5–1 | .453 | .371 | W1 |
Wild cards
| 5 | San Francisco 49ers | West | 12 | 4 | 0 | .750 | 5–1 | 9–3 | .494 | .414 | W6 |
| 6 | New Orleans Saints | South | 11 | 5 | 0 | .688 | 5–1 | 9–3 | .516 | .455 | W1 |
Did not qualify for the postseason
| 7 | Arizona Cardinals | West | 10 | 6 | 0 | .625 | 2–4 | 6–6 | .531 | .444 | L1 |
| 8 (Note: Chicago defeated Dallas head-to-head (Week 14, 45–28).) | Chicago Bears | North | 8 | 8 | 0 | .500 | 2–4 | 4–8 | .465 | .469 | L2 |
| 9 | Dallas Cowboys | East | 8 | 8 | 0 | .500 | 5–1 | 7–5 | .484 | .363 | L1 |
| 10 (Note: The NY Giants and Detroit finished with a better conference record than St. Louis.) (Note: The NY Giants defeated Detroit head-to-head (Week 16, 23–20 (OT)).) | New York Giants | East | 7 | 9 | 0 | .438 | 3–3 | 6–6 | .520 | .366 | W2 |
| 11 (Note: Detroit finished with a better conference record than St. Louis.) | Detroit Lions | North | 7 | 9 | 0 | .438 | 4–2 | 6–6 | .457 | .402 | L4 |
| 12 | St. Louis Rams | West | 7 | 9 | 0 | .438 | 1–5 | 4–8 | .551 | .446 | L1 |
| 13 | Minnesota Vikings | North | 5 | 10 | 1 | .344 | 2–3–1 | 4–7–1 | .512 | .450 | W1 |
| 14 (Note: Atlanta finished with a better conference record than Tampa Bay.) | Atlanta Falcons | South | 4 | 12 | 0 | .250 | 1–5 | 3–9 | .553 | .313 | L2 |
| 15 | Tampa Bay Buccaneers | South | 4 | 12 | 0 | .250 | 1–5 | 2–10 | .574 | .391 | L3 |
| 16 | Washington Redskins | East | 3 | 13 | 0 | .188 | 0–6 | 1–11 | .516 | .438 | L8 |
Tiebreakers (Note: When breaking ties for three or more teams under the NFL's rules, they are first broken within divisions, then comparing only the highest-ranked remaining team from each division.)

== Postseason ==
=== Schedule ===
| Round | Date | Opponent (seed) | Result | Record | Venue | Recap |
|---|---|---|---|---|---|---|
| Wild Card | First-round bye | | | | | |
| Divisional | January 12, 2014 | San Francisco 49ers (5) | L 10–23 | 0–1 | Bank of America Stadium | Recap |

=== Game summaries ===
==== NFC Divisional Playoffs: vs. (5) San Francisco 49ers ====
NFC Divisional Playoffs: (5) San Francisco 49ers at (2) Carolina Panthers – Game summary

| Quarter | 1 | 2 | 3 | 4 | Total |
|---|---|---|---|---|---|
| 49ers | 6 | 7 | 7 | 3 | 23 |
| Panthers | 0 | 10 | 0 | 0 | 10 |

at Bank of America Stadium, Charlotte, North Carolina

- Date: January 12, 2014
- Game time: 1:05 p.m. EST
- Game weather: 54 °F (12 °C), sunny
- Game attendance: 73,784
- Referee: Carl Cheffers
- TV announcers (Fox): Joe Buck, Troy Aikman and Pam Oliver
- Recap, Game book

Game information

First quarter

- SF – Phil Dawson 49-yard field goal, 9:12. 49ers 3–0. Drive: 13 plays, 49 yards, 5:48.
- SF – Phil Dawson 33-yard field goal, 4:33. 49ers 6–0. Drive: 6 plays, 31 yards, 1:45.

Second quarter

- CAR – Steve Smith 31-yard pass from Cam Newton (Graham Gano kick), 13:40. Panthers 7–6. Drive: 1 play, 31 yards, 0:07.
- CAR – Graham Gano 24-yard field goal, 3:41. Panthers 10–6. Drive: 13 plays, 73 yards, 8:59.
- SF – Vernon Davis 1-yard pass from Colin Kaepernick (Phil Dawson kick), 0:05. 49ers 13–10. Drive: 12 plays, 80 yards, 3:36.

Third quarter

- SF – Colin Kaepernick 4-yard rush (Phil Dawson kick), 8:53. 49ers 20–10. Drive: 8 plays, 77 yards, 4:32.

Fourth quarter

- SF – Phil Dawson 34-yard field goal, 7:41. 49ers 23–10. Drive: 13 plays, 73 yards, 7:58.

Top passers

- SF – Colin Kaepernick – 15/28, 196 yards, TD
- CAR – Cam Newton – 16/25, 267 yards, TD, 2 INT

Top rushers

- SF – Frank Gore – 17 rushes, 84 yards
- CAR – Cam Newton – 10 rushes, 54 yards

Top receivers

- SF – Anquan Boldin – 8 receptions, 136 yards
- CAR – Ted Ginn Jr. – 4 receptions, 104 yards

The Panthers played at home against the #5 seed 49ers. The 49ers led for most of the game and eventually won, ending the Panthers' season and dropping them to a 12–5 total. Also, Cam Newton went 0–1 as a starter for the Panthers in the playoffs while the team went 10–19 when he turned the ball over. This would be the Panthers last playoff loss at home until 2025.
