= Eric Herman (American football) =

American football player (born 1989)

No. 62
- Position: Offensive guard

Personal information
- Born: October 5, 1989 (age 37); Oregon, Ohio, U.S.
- Listed height: 6 ft 4 in (1.93 m)
- Listed weight: 320 lb (145 kg)

Career information
- High school: Central Catholic (Toledo, Ohio)
- College: Ohio
- NFL draft: 2013: 7th round, 225th overall pick

Career history
- New York Giants (2013−2014); Baltimore Ravens (2015)*; Indianapolis Colts (2016)*
- * Offseason or practice squad member only

Awards and highlights
- 2× Second-team All-MAC (2011, 2012)
- Stats at Pro Football Reference

Eric Herman (born October 5, 1989) is an American former professional football player who was an offensive guard in the National Football League (NFL). He played college football for the Ohio Bobcats and was selected by the New York Giants in the seventh round of the 2013 NFL draft.

== Professional career ==
=== New York Giants ===
On April 27, 2013, Herman was selected by the New York Giants in the seventh round, 225 overall pick of the 2013 NFL draft. On August 8, 2014, Herman was suspended for violating the NFL policy on performance-enhancing substances. On September 19, he was waived by the Giants. On September 22, Herman was re-signed to the team's practice squad. On September 1, 2015, he was waived by the Giants.

=== Baltimore Ravens ===
On December 17, 2015, Herman was signed by to the Baltimore Ravens practice squad.

=== Indianapolis Colts ===
On August 21, 2016, Herman was signed by the Indianapolis Colts. On August 28, Herman was waived by the Colts.
