= Cooper Taylor =

American football player (born 1990)

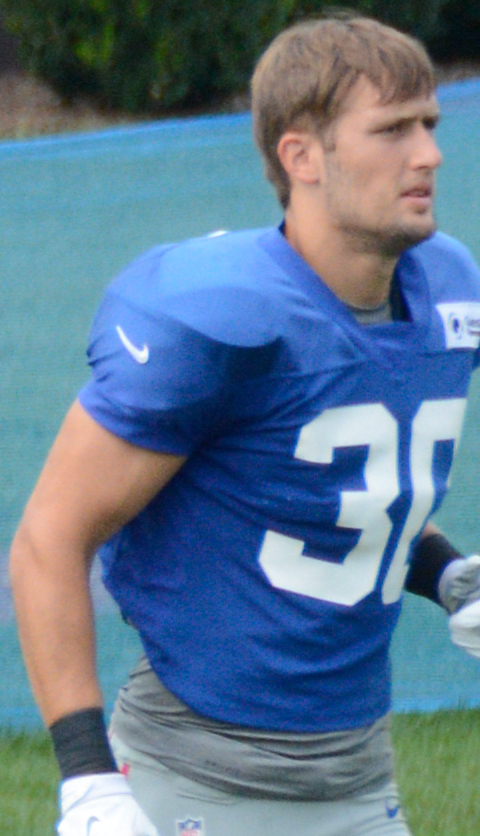
- Taylor in 2016

No. 30
- Position: Safety

Personal information
- Born: April 4, 1990 (age 36); Atlanta, Georgia, U.S.
- Listed height: 6 ft 4 in (1.93 m)
- Listed weight: 229 lb (104 kg)

Career information
- High school: Marist (Atlanta)
- College: Georgia Tech (2008-2010); Richmond (2011-2012)
- NFL draft: 2013: 5th round, 151st overall pick

Career history
- New York Giants (2013–2015)

Career NFL statistics
- Total tackles: 15
- Stats at Pro Football Reference

Cooper Taylor (born April 4, 1990) is an American former professional football player who was a safety in the National Football League (NFL). He played college football for the Georgia Tech Yellow Jackets before transferring to the Richmond Spiders. He was selected in the fifth round by the New York Giants of the 2013 NFL draft.

== Early life ==
Taylor attended Marist High School in Atlanta, Georgia. He was a two-time all-state and all-county selection and also earned three varsity letters in football in high school.

== College career ==
=== Georgia Tech ===
He played college football at Georgia Tech from 2008 to 2010. He was selected for the second-team All-ACC by Rivals and was an honorable mention Freshmen All-America by College Football News in the 2008 season.

=== Richmond ===
After being diagnosed with Wolff-Parkinson-White Syndrome, Taylor missed most of the 2009 and 2010 seasons with Georgia Tech and transferred. He spent his final two seasons at the University of Richmond. He was impressive during his time with the Spiders. In his senior season he was a selected for the First-team AP All-American, First-team Walter Camp All-America, First-team The Sports Network All-American, Second-team All-American by Phil Steele and the Second-team All-American by Beyond College Sports First-team All-CAA, the First-team VaSID All-State, College Sports Madness First-team All-CAA, the First-team Capital One Academic All-American and was the selection of the CoSIDA Academic All-District. He also was selected for The Touchdown Club of Richmond Division I National Defensive Back of the Year. Following the conclusion of his senior season, Taylor was selected to and participated in the 2013 East-West Shrine Game as a member on the East team. On February 19, 2013, he was selected as the CAA Football Scholar Athlete Of The Year.

== Professional career ==
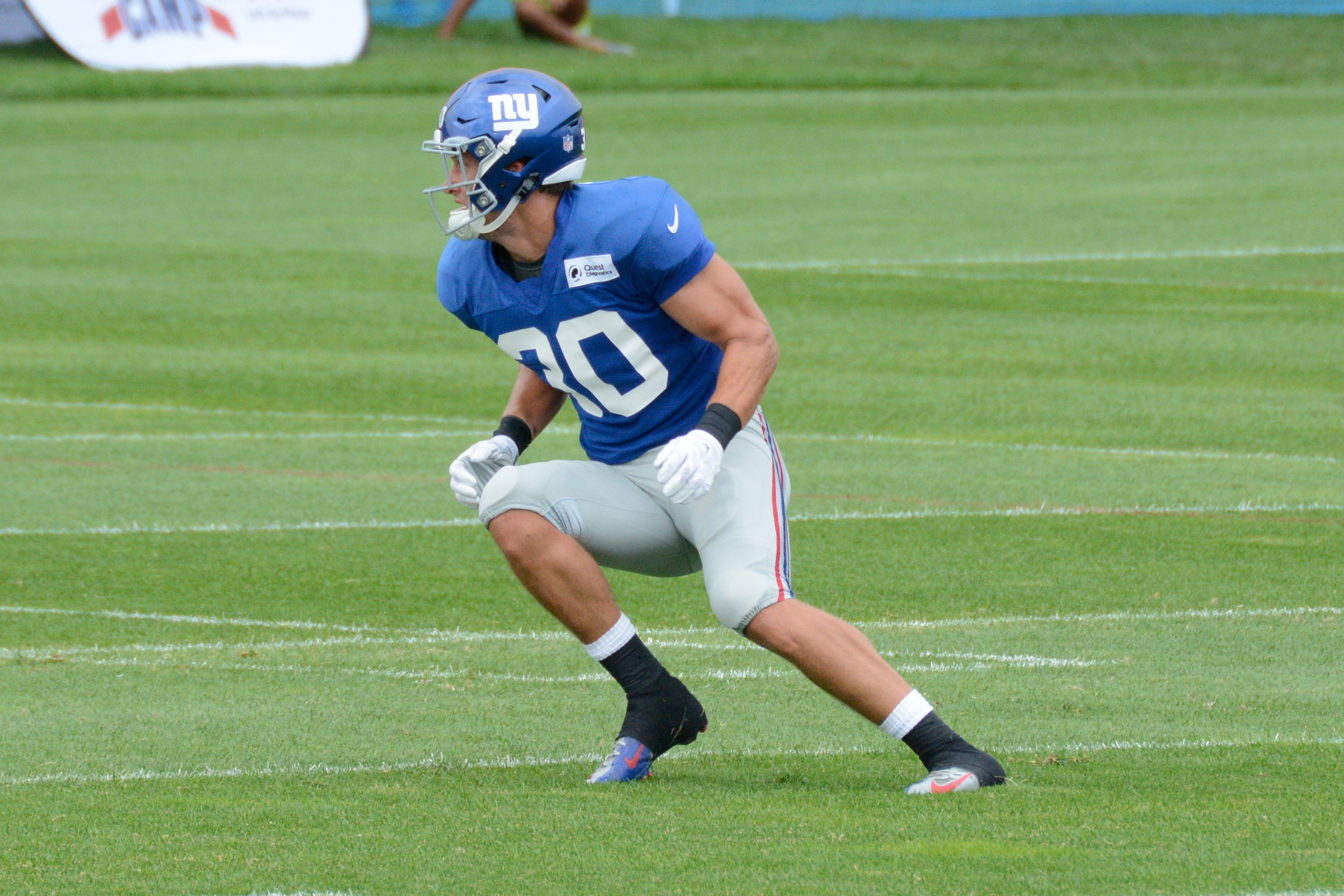
Taylor in 2016

Pre-draft measurables
Height	Weight	40-yard dash	10-yard split	20-yard split	20-yard shuttle	Three-cone drill	Vertical jump	Broad jump	Bench press
6 ft 4 3/4 in (1.95 m)	228 lb (103 kg)	4.49 s	1.60 s	2.63 s	4.29 s	6.96 s	36 1/2 in (0.93 m)	10 ft 7 in (3.23 m)	23 reps
All values from NFL Combine.

Before the draft, Taylor impressed scouts during his performance in the East-West Shrine Game. His large frame (6'5", 228 pounds) and athleticism drew many comparisons to Seattle Seahawks safety Kam Chancellor. Taylor was eventually selected in the fifth round (152nd overall) in the 2013 NFL draft by the New York Giants. On October 20, 2015, he was waived by the Giants. On November 4, 2015, he was signed to the practice squad. On November 18, 2015, Taylor was promoted to the active roster. On August 30, 2016, he was waived by the Giants.

== Personal life ==
Taylor is the son of former Georgia Tech quarterback Jim Bob Taylor who was selected in the 11th round in the 1983 NFL draft by the Baltimore Colts, where he spent his only NFL season in 1983.
