= R. J. Webb =

American football player (born 1987)

R.J. Webb
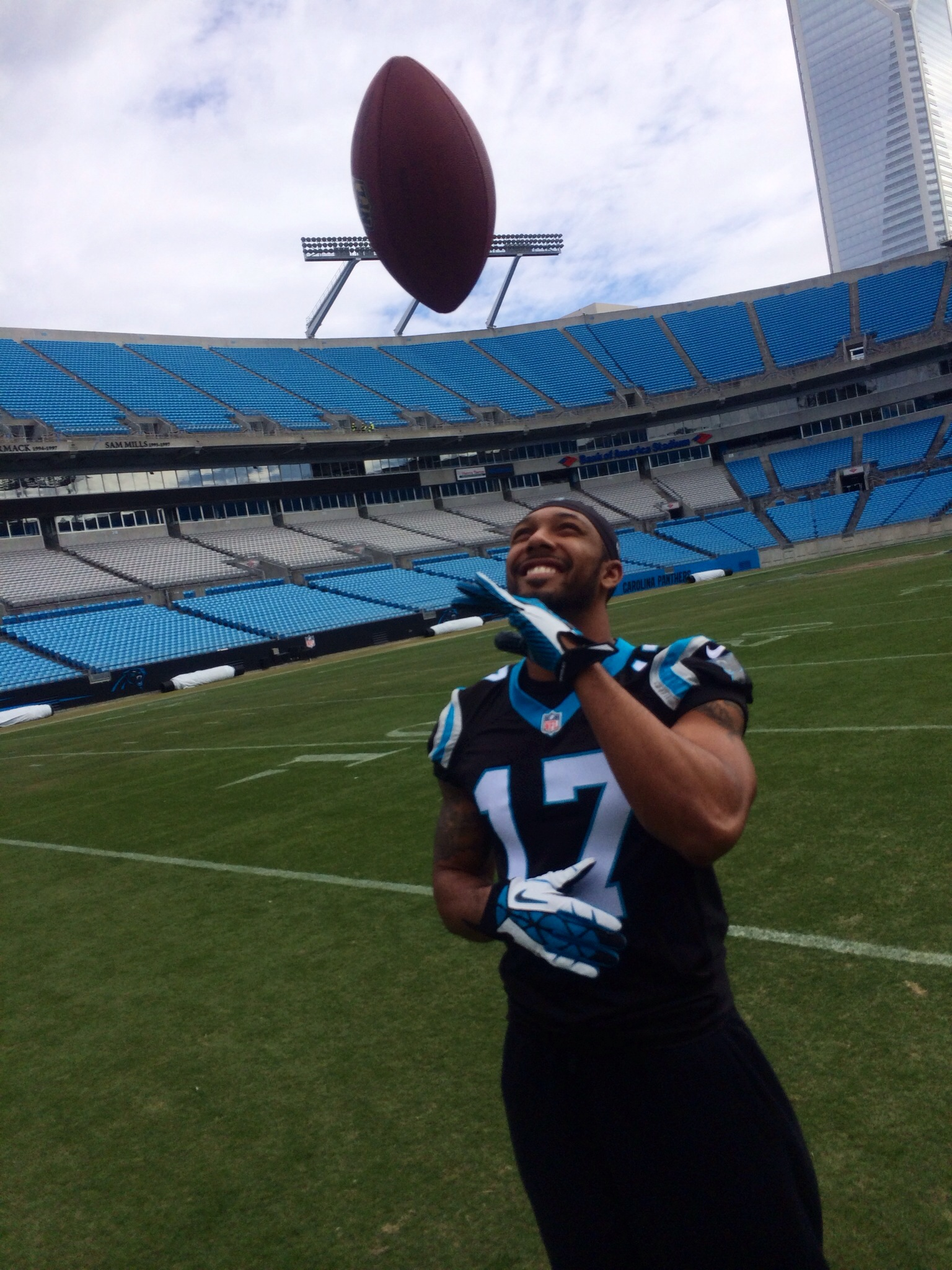

Buffalo Bills
- Title: Area scout

Personal information
- Born: August 24, 1987 (age 39); Greenville, South Carolina, U.S.
- Listed height: 6 ft 2 in (1.88 m)
- Listed weight: 205 lb (93 kg)

Career information
- High school: Pickens HS
- College: Furman
- NFL draft: 2013: undrafted

Career history

Playing
- Carolina Panthers (2013)

Operations
- Buffalo Bills (2019) Player personnel coordinator; Buffalo Bills (2020–2023) Pro scout; Buffalo Bills (2024) Regional scout; Buffalo Bills (2025–present) Area scout
- Stats at Pro Football Reference

Ronald Coleman Webb Jr. (born August 24, 1987) is an American former football wide receiver and current area scout for the Buffalo Bills. After playing college football for the Furman University, he was signed by the Carolina Panthers as an undrafted free agent after going unselected in the 2013 NFL draft.

== Background ==
Webb attended Pickens High School where he was one of the most sought after recruits in history receiving offers in football, basketball, and baseball. He also was a three-year starter in all three sports. While playing quarterback for the school's football team; he was coached by legendary NFL Coach Sam Wyche.

After graduating from high school, Webb attended Furman University in Greenville South Carolina where he majored in health and exercise science. Webb had a very impressive season in his first campaign, catching a freshman record of 28 passes for another freshman standard 407 yards and a touchdown in helping the Paladins to an 8-4 record, third straight playoff appearance, action in all 12 games and one start - the first of his career -, netted a season best four receptions in four games including a 74-yard performance against North Carolina that included a spectacular catch and run along the sideline on a 49-yard play which totaled 80 yards on four grabs versus The Citadel and collected a 12-yard touchdown reception versus Chattanooga, against whom he later made perhaps the most important catch of the year in the last seconds of regulation : Webb slipped behind a defender for a catch which he extended with a dazzling run for an eventual 41-yard play.

Webb appeared on his way to a breakout season with 23 receptions for 317 yards and two touchdowns before sustaining a torn anterior cruciate ligament. in game five against Coastal Carolina Had his comeback from season-ending injury in 2007 cut short in the first half of Furman's season opener against Mars Hill after suffering a torn anterior cruciate ligament, that after sustaining the same injury to his other knee the year before.

During his college career, Webb played in 29 games with 13 starts at Furman.

- Tallied 85 receptions for 1,082 yards and eight touchdowns.
- Rushed five times for 52 yards.
- Returned nine kickoffs for 195 yards and five punts for 127 yards with one touchdown
- Set the record for longest punt return for a touchdown in school history (63 yards)

2009 (Sr.): Started 11 games. Webb ranked second on the Paladins with 31 catches for 322 yards and four touchdowns. Averaged 21.7 yards on nine kickoff returns for 195 yards and 18.0 yards on three punt returns for 54 yards.

2008 (Jr.): Started the season opener against Mars Hill, catching three passes for 36 yards and one touchdown, but suffered a season-ending torn left anterior cruciate ligament in the first quarter.

2007 (So.): Played in five games. Posted 23 receptions for 317 yards and two touchdowns. Returned a punt 63 yards for a touchdown against Coastal Carolina before suffering a season-ending torn right anterior cruciate ligament in the same game.

2006 (Fr.): Played in 12 games with one start. Set then school freshman records of 28 catches and 407 yards with one touchdown.

2005: Redshirted as a true freshman

== Professional career ==
On May 13, 2013, Webb was signed by Carolina Panthers as a free agent but placed on injured reserve with an injured right knee.

Webb was a participant in the Inaugural South Carolina All Star Bowl, where he was coached by former Clemson University head coach, Danny Ford in 2013. Webb was on the winning "Nationals" team coached by former NFL players Nick Eason and Brian Dawkins. He was waived on April 11, 2014.

== Awards ==
Pickens High School - Webb earned:

- Football: Two-time all-region I 3A team, SC 3A All-State team, SC All-Prep SouthEast team
- Baseball: all-region I 3A, SC 3A All-State team
- Basketball: Two time all-region I 3A, SC 3A All-State team
- In 2012, Webb was inducted into the Pickens High School Athletic Hall Of Fame

Furman University - Webb was named to the Freshman Southern Conference Academic All Southern Conference Team. Received the team's Purple Heart Award in 2009, which is given to the comeback player of the year. Webb recovered to return his senior season after tearing an anterior cruciate ligament in each the previous two seasons.

== Filmography ==
Webb has appeared in several films and television series as "himself", which include:

- The Dark Knight Rises
- Neighborhood Watch
- Trouble with the Curve
- '42
- Necessary Roughness
- Single Ladies
- The Game
