= 2013 NFL season =

American football season

Regular season
- Duration: September 5 – December 29, 2013

Playoffs
- Start date: January 4, 2014
- AFC Champions: Denver Broncos
- NFC Champions: Seattle Seahawks

Super Bowl XLVIII
- Date: February 2, 2014
- Site: MetLife Stadium, East Rutherford, New Jersey
- Champions: Seattle Seahawks

Pro Bowl
- Date: January 26, 2014
- Site: Aloha Stadium, Honolulu, Hawaii

AFC teams: West, North, South, East
NFC teams: West, North, South, East

The 2013 NFL season was the 94th season in the history of the National Football League (NFL) and the 48th of the Super Bowl era. The season saw the Seattle Seahawks capture the first championship in the franchise's 38 years in the league with a lopsided victory over the Denver Broncos in Super Bowl XLVIII, the league's championship game. The Super Bowl was played at MetLife Stadium in East Rutherford, New Jersey, on Sunday, February 2, 2014. It was the first Super Bowl hosted by New Jersey and the first to be held outdoors in a cold weather environment. The Seahawks scored 12 seconds into the game and led the rest of the way on the back of their Legion of Boom defense. The Seahawks ultimately defeated the Broncos 43–8.

Broncos quarterback Peyton Manning was named the regular season's Most Valuable Player (MVP) by the voters of the Associated Press (AP) for a record fifth time after compiling passing stats including regular-season records for passing yards and passing touchdowns. Manning also was named the Offensive Player of the Year for the second time in his career. Carolina Panthers linebacker Luke Kuechly earned Defensive Player of the Year honors.

Scoring reached historic levels throughout the league in 2013. As a whole, the league set records for total points scored, points scored per game, and touchdowns and field goals scored. The Broncos set a new standard for team scoring in the regular season with 606 points. Ten other teams each scored over 400 points, the greatest number to surpass that benchmark in a single year until 2020.

The regular season got underway on Thursday, September 5, 2013, with the Broncos hosting the defending Super Bowl XLVII champion Baltimore Ravens in the annual kickoff game. The game presaged the Broncos' historic offensive production with a strong performance by Peyton Manning in which he tied a league record in throwing seven touchdown passes and led the Broncos to a win. The game was the start of a disappointing season for the Ravens in which they would finish out of the playoffs with an 8–8 record, thus ensuring there would be no repeat Super Bowl winner for a record-tying ninth straight season. The regular season wrapped up on Sunday night, December 29.

The playoffs began with the wild card round which took place the first weekend of January 2014. The league's propensity for scoring did not abate in the post-season, as exemplified by the Indianapolis Colts' wild come-from-behind victory over the Kansas City Chiefs in the playoffs' opening game. The Conference Championship games featured the top seeded teams in each conference, the Seahawks in the NFC and the Broncos in the American Football Conference (AFC), hosting the San Francisco 49ers and New England Patriots respectively. Both home teams prevailed to set up just the second Super Bowl matchup of No. 1 seeds in the past 20 seasons.

== Player movement ==
The 2013 league year began at 4 pm EST on March 12, which marked the start of the league's free agency period. The per-team salary cap was set at US$123,000,000. For the first time the league instituted a negotiating period prior to the start of free agency during which time agents representing prospective unrestricted free agent players (though not the players themselves) were allowed to have contact with team representatives with the purpose of determining a player's market value and to begin contract negotiations. This period, which was referred to by some as the "legal tampering" period, began at midnight on March 9.

=== Free agency ===
A total of 524 players were eligible for some form of free agency. Among the high-profile players who changed teams via free agency included:

- Quarterbacks Matt Cassel (Kansas City to Minnesota), Ryan Fitzpatrick (Buffalo to Tennessee), Matt Hasselbeck (Tennessee to Indianapolis), Brian Hoyer (Arizona to Cleveland) and Kevin Kolb (Arizona to Buffalo)
- Running backs Ahmad Bradshaw (New York Giants to Indianapolis), Reggie Bush (Miami to Detroit), Shonn Greene (New York Jets to Tennessee), Steven Jackson (St. Louis to Atlanta) and Rashard Mendenhall (Pittsburgh to Arizona)
- Wide receivers Danny Amendola (St. Louis to New England), Darrius Heyward-Bey (Oakland to Indianapolis), Greg Jennings (Green Bay to Minnesota), Mike Wallace (Pittsburgh to Miami) and Wes Welker (New England to Denver)
- Tight ends Martellus Bennett (New York Giants to Chicago), Jared Cook (Tennessee to St. Louis), Dustin Keller (New York Jets to Miami) and Delanie Walker (San Francisco to Tennessee)
- Offensive tackles Jermon Bushrod (New Orleans to Chicago), Gosder Cherilus (Detroit to Indianapolis) and Jake Long (Miami to St. Louis)
- Guards Andy Levitre (Buffalo to Tennessee) and Louis Vasquez (Denver to San Diego)
- Defensive ends Cliff Avril (Detroit to Seattle), Michael Bennett (Tampa Bay to Seattle), Elvis Dumervil (Denver to Baltimore), Dwight Freeney (Indianapolis to San Diego) and Osi Umenyiora (New York Giants to Atlanta)
- Defensive tackles Desmond Bryant (Oakland to Cleveland), Ricky Jean-Francois (San Francisco to Indianapolis), Jason Jones (Seattle to Detroit) and Sammie Lee Hill (Detroit to Tennessee)
- Linebackers Connor Barwin (Houston to Philadelphia), James Harrison (Pittsburgh to Cincinnati), Paul Kruger (Baltimore to Cleveland) and Philip Wheeler (Oakland to Miami)
- Cornerbacks Brent Grimes (Atlanta to Miami), Keenan Lewis (Pittsburgh to New Orleans), Dunta Robinson (Atlanta to Kansas City), Dominique Rodgers-Cromartie (Arizona to Denver) and Sean Smith (Miami to Kansas City)
- Safeties Patrick Chung (New England to Philadelphia), Dashon Goldson (San Francisco to Tampa Bay), LaRon Landry (New York Jets to Indianapolis) and Glover Quin (Houston to Detroit).

Eight players were assigned the non-exclusive franchise tag by their teams, which ensured that the team would receive compensation were the player to sign a contract with another team. These players were Brandon Albert (Chiefs), Jairus Byrd (Bills), Ryan Clady (Broncos), Michael Johnson (Bengals), Pat McAfee (Colts), Henry Melton (Bears), Anthony Spencer (Cowboys) and Randy Starks (Dolphins). None of these players changed teams.

=== Major trades ===
The following trades are notable as they involved Pro Bowl-caliber players and/or draft picks in the first three rounds:

Offseason

- February 27 – The Chiefs acquired quarterback Alex Smith from the 49ers for the Chiefs' second-round pick in the 2013 draft, 34th overall (which the 49ers later traded to the Titans) and a conditional pick in the 2014 draft (which turned out to be another second-rounder, #56 overall). Smith had been the first overall selection of the 2005 NFL draft, but had been supplanted as the 49ers starting quarterback in mid-2012 by Colin Kaepernick.

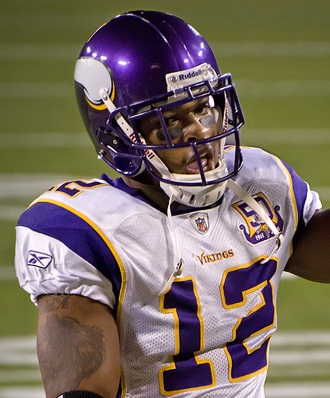
Percy Harvin was traded by the Vikings to the Seahawks

- March 11 – Wide receiver Percy Harvin was traded by the Vikings to the Seahawks for the Seahawks' 2013 first-round (#25 overall, with which the Vikings selected Xavier Rhodes) and seventh-round (pick No. 214) selections as well as the Seahawks' third-round pick in 2014 (the 96th selection). Harvin is an All-Pro and former Offensive Rookie of the Year, but he has also suffered a series of injuries throughout his career and had become disgruntled with the Vikings to the point that he asked the team to trade him. The Seahawks subsequently signed Harvin to a 6-year, $67 million contract extension which includes $25.5 million in guaranteed money.
- March 11 – The 49ers acquired wide receiver Anquan Boldin from the Ravens for a sixth-round selection in the 2013 draft (the 199th overall pick). Boldin, a three-time Pro Bowler and former Offensive Rookie of the Year, had refused to accept a pay cut that the Ravens had requested.

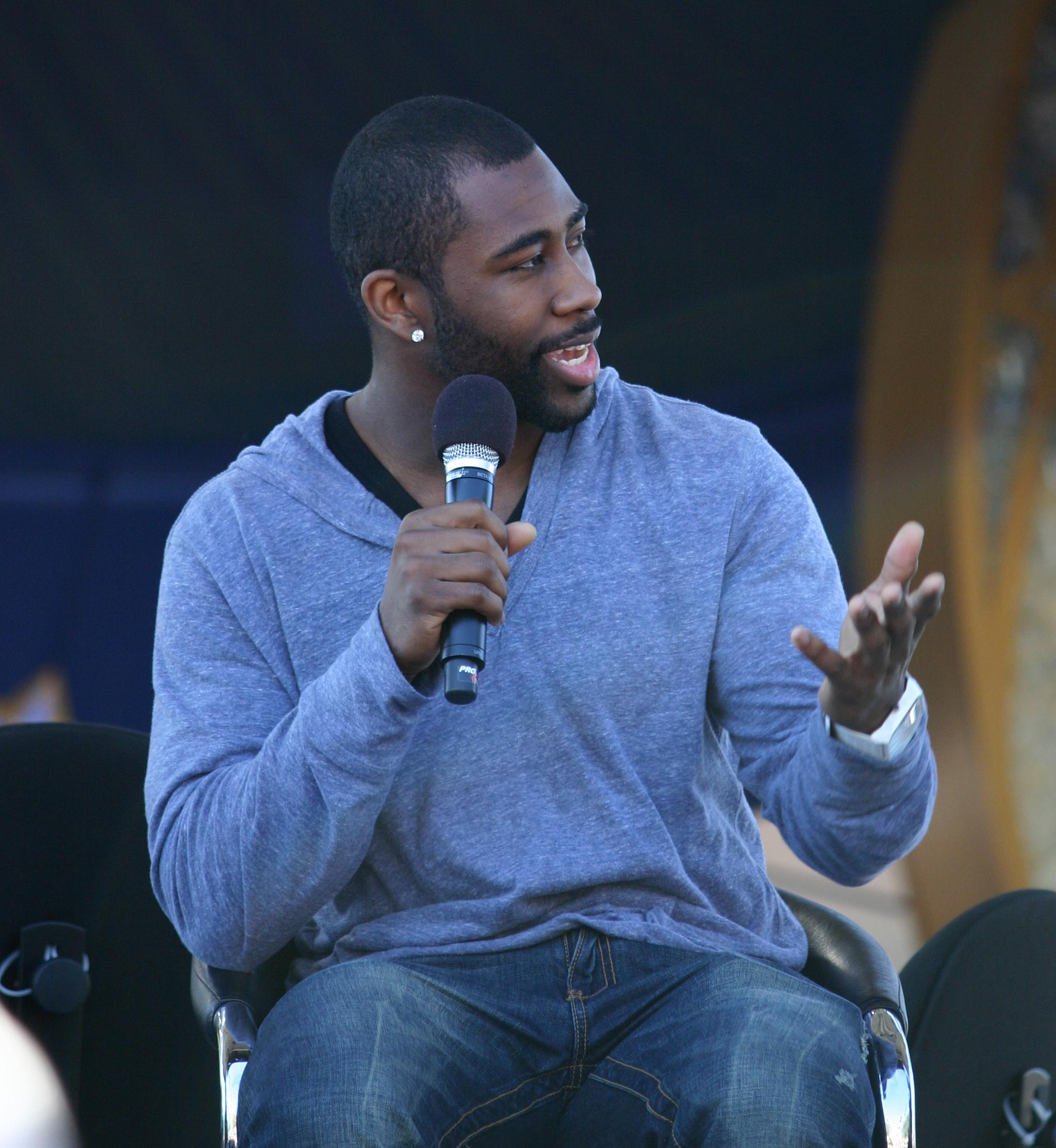
The Jets traded Darrelle Revis to the Buccaneers

- April 21 – Cornerback Darrelle Revis was traded by the Jets to the Buccaneers. The Jets received the Bucs' first round draft pick in 2013, the 13th overall selection (which the Jets used to select Sheldon Richardson) and a conditional pick which would become the Bucs' fourth-round selection in 2014, the 104th overall pick. Revis, a three time All-Pro, was widely considered to be among the league's top defensive players, but he was coming off a knee injury and the Jets did not feel they would be able to retain him after the 2013 season. The Bucs signed Revis to a 6-year, $96 million contract.

In-season

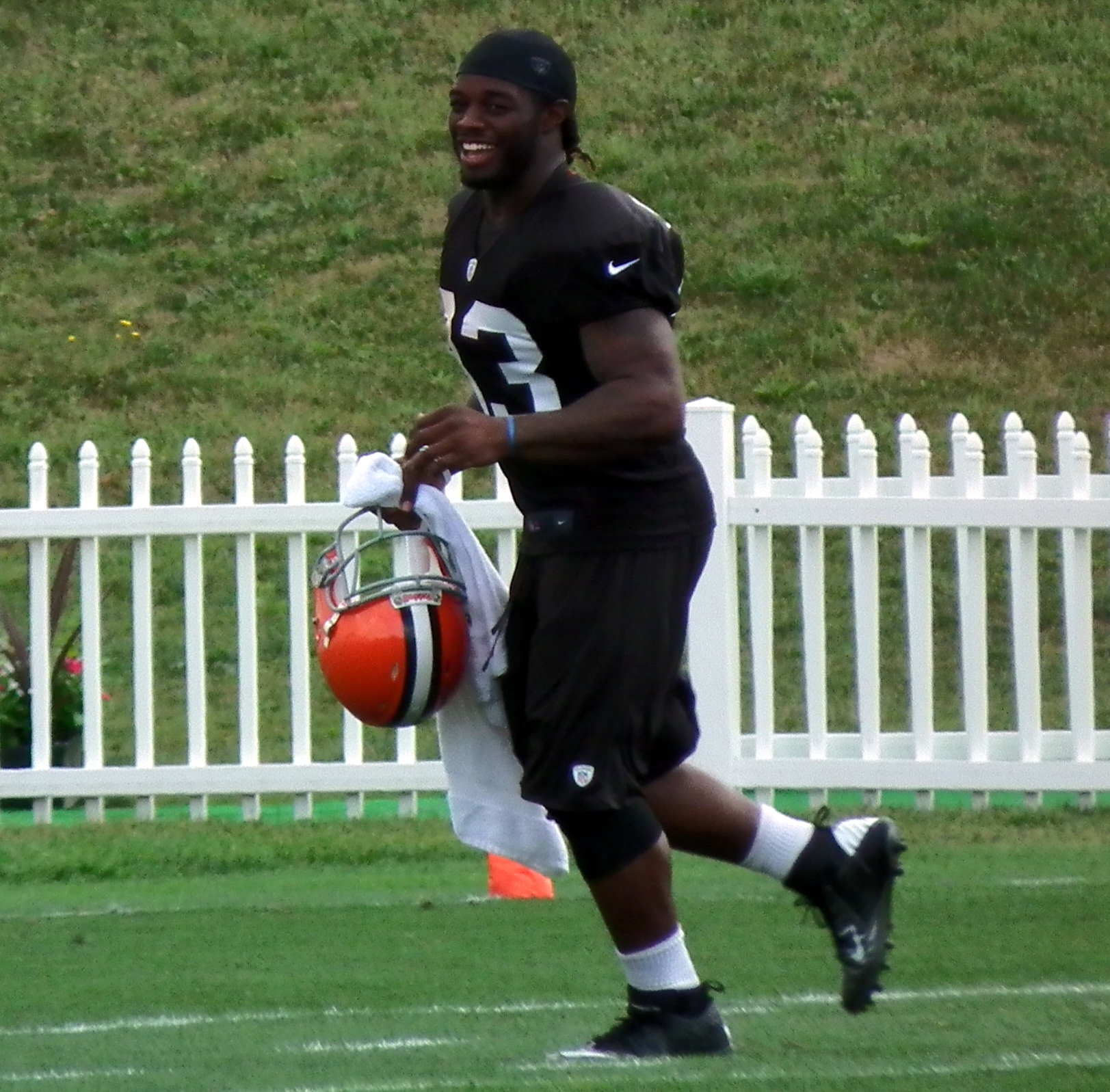
Trent Richardson was acquired by the Colts

- September 18 – In a bit of a shocking mid-season move the Browns traded running back Trent Richardson to the Colts in exchange for the Colts' first-round pick (26th overall) in the 2014 draft. The Browns had moved up in the previous year's draft to grab Richardson with the third overall selection and he was presumed to be a cornerstone of the team.
- October 2 – Offensive tackle Eugene Monroe was traded by the Jaguars to the Ravens in exchange for fourth- and fifth-round selections in the 2014 draft (picks #114 and #159 overall). The Jaguars had selected Monroe eight overall in the 2009 draft.

=== Draft ===
The 2013 NFL draft was held April 25–27, 2013, in New York City. Prior to the draft the NFL Scouting Combine, where draft-eligible players were evaluated by team personnel, was held in Indianapolis on February 20–26. In the draft, the Kansas City Chiefs made Central Michigan University offensive tackle Eric Fisher the first overall selection.

== Officiating changes ==
Dean Blandino was named as the league's new Vice President of Officiating, succeeding Carl Johnson. Referee Alberto Riveron was then promoted to the league's Senior Director of Officiating, a newly created position as a second-in-command under Blandino. Bill Vinovich, who worked the previous season as a substitute referee, was then assigned to head Riveron's former on-field officiating crew.

== Rule changes ==
The following rule changes were approved at the NFL owners' meeting on March 20, 2013:

- The "no-challenge" rule adopted prior to the 2012 season was modified to eliminate the automatic "no-review" penalty when a coach challenges a play that is subject to automatic review by the replay booth (turnovers, scoring plays, and any play inside of the two-minute warning). This change was prompted after last season's Thanksgiving Day game when Detroit Lions' head coach Jim Schwartz threw a challenge flag on a play where replay clearly showed Houston Texans' running back Justin Forsett's knee touched the ground, but was able to get up and score a touchdown. Due to the way the rule was written at the time the penalty for the errant challenge prevented the play from being reviewed. Under the revised rule teams will be charged a time-out (or an unsportsmanlike conduct penalty if the team is out of time-outs) when a coach throws a challenge flag on a booth-reviewable play, but the play will still be reviewed if the replay booth believes a review is necessary. This change has been referred to as the "Jim Schwartz rule".
- Making it a fumble when a player loses possession of the football while in the act of trying to bring it back to his body. This abolishes the so-called "tuck rule" which was adopted prior to the 1999 season. Under the revised rule it will be ruled a fumble when a quarterback loses possession of the ball after a pump fake while bringing the ball back to his body.
- Tight ends and H-backs will now be permitted to wear uniform numbers 40–49 as well as 80–89. Previously the two positions were treated separately with tight ends allowed to wear only 80–89 and H-backs limited to wearing 40–49.
- "Peel-back" blocks will now result in 15-yard personal foul penalties anywhere on the field. Previously, these types of blocks were permitted within the tackle box.
- On field goal and extra point attempts, long snappers will now be considered defenseless players. In addition, defensive players are prohibited from blocking low at the snap of a scrimmage kick.
- For field goal and extra point attempts the defensive team can have no more than six players on either side of the ball at the snap (5 yard penalty), and players cannot push teammates into blockers (15 yard penalty).
- Any player at least three yards downfield or outside of the "tackle box" who leads with his helmet on a hit will be penalized 15 yards for unnecessary roughness. If both offensive and defensive players lead with helmets on the same play, both will be penalized.

Player safety changes

- Upon recommendation by the league's Head, Neck and Spine safety committee, the NFL notified teams in August that clubs would no longer be allowed to use alternate helmets for throwback uniforms or third jerseys as they had been allowed to do since throwbacks were introduced in 1994. Once players start the season with properly fitted helmets that they are comfortable wearing, the league's Head, Neck, and Spine Committee recommended that players should not switch helmets in mid-season, especially to ones that have not been broken in yet. To comply with these new rules, teams will be allowed to change or remove the decals on their regular helmets for such uniforms.
- All players (except for punters and kickers) were required to wear thigh and knee pads. It was previously mandatory to wear these pads from 1979 through 1994.

== Preseason ==
Training camps for the 2013 season opened in late July. The Buccaneers camp was the first to open with rookies reporting on July 17. The Cowboys were the first to open camp to veteran players on July 20. All teams were in camp by July 27.

Prior to the start of the regular season, each team played at least four preseason exhibition games. The preseason schedule got underway with the Pro Football Hall of Fame Game on Sunday, August 4. The Hall of Fame game is a traditional part of the annual Pro Football Hall of Fame induction weekend celebrating new Hall of Fame members. It was played at Fawcett Stadium in Canton, Ohio, which is located adjacent to the Hall of Fame building. In the game, which was televised nationally on NBC, the Dallas Cowboys defeated the Miami Dolphins 24–20. The 2013 Hall of Fame class of Larry Allen, Cris Carter, Curley Culp, Jonathan Ogden, Bill Parcells, Dave Robinson and Warren Sapp was honored during the game. The 65-game preseason schedule concluded on Thursday, August 29.

== Regular season ==
The 2013 season featured 256 games played out over a seventeen-week schedule which began on the Thursday night following Labor Day. Each of the league's 32 teams played a 16-game schedule which included one bye week for each team between weeks four and twelve. The slate featured seventeen games on Monday night including a doubleheader in the season's opening week. There were also seventeen games played on Thursday, including the National Football League Kickoff game in prime time on September 5 and three games on Thanksgiving Day. The regular season wrapped up with a full slate of 16 games on Sunday, December 29, all of which were intra-divisional matchups.

Scheduling formula

Under the NFL's scheduling formula, each team played each of the other three teams in their own division twice. In addition, a team played against all four teams in one other division from each conference. The final two games on a team's schedule were against the two teams in the team's own conference in the divisions the team was not set to play who finished the previous season in the same rank in their division (e.g. the team which finished first in its division the previous season would play each other team in their conference that also finished first in its respective division). The pre-set division pairings for 2013 were as follows:

Intra-conference
AFC North vs. AFC East
AFC South vs. AFC West
NFC North vs. NFC East
NFC South vs. NFC West

Inter-conference
AFC North vs. NFC North
AFC South vs. NFC West
AFC East vs. NFC South
AFC West vs. NFC East

The 2013 regular season schedule was released on April 18, 2013.

Regular season highlights

The 2013 regular season began on Thursday, September 5, with the NFL Kickoff Game in which the Denver Broncos hosted the Baltimore Ravens. The game was a rematch of a two-overtime playoff game of the previous season and broadcast on NBC. The Ravens, as the reigning Super Bowl champions, would normally have hosted the kickoff game, however, a scheduling conflict with their Major League Baseball counterparts, the Baltimore Orioles, forced the Ravens to start the season on the road (the Ravens' and Orioles' respective stadiums share parking facilities). The Ravens became the first Super Bowl winner since 2003 to open their title defense on the road. The Broncos defeated the Ravens 49–27 on the strength of a record-setting performance by quarterback Peyton Manning. Manning completed 27 of 42 pass attempts for 462 yards and seven touchdowns. Manning set or tied numerous league records in the game including most touchdown passes in a game (tied with five others) and records for most career games with at least six, five and four touchdown passes.

There were two NFL International Series games held at Wembley Stadium in London. On September 29, the Minnesota Vikings defeated the Pittsburgh Steelers 34–27. On October 27, the San Francisco 49ers defeated the Jacksonville Jaguars 42–10. This season was the first of a four-year agreement for the Jaguars to play a home game in London (an agreement which was later extended an additional four years).

The San Diego Chargers and Oakland Raiders played an unusual late night game in the season's fifth week on October 6. The game, originally scheduled to start at 1:25 pm PDT, had to be moved to the evening to accommodate stadium schedules – Major League Baseball's Oakland Athletics, co-tenants of O.co Coliseum, had hosted the Game 2 of the 2013 American League Division Series the previous night and stadium crews needed nearly 24 hours to convert the stadium from a baseball to a football configuration. O.co Coliseum was only multi-purpose stadium which hosted both an NFL and an MLB team in 2013. Although the stadium conversion was complete by 3:30 pm local time, an 8:36 pm kickoff was necessary to avoid conflict with NBC's Sunday Night Football, where the San Francisco 49ers hosted the Houston Texans at Candlestick Park across the San Francisco Bay. The Chargers-Raiders game was the latest start time for a game in NFL history and was broadcast nationwide on the NFL Network.

The league's traditional slate of Thanksgiving Day games was played on Thursday, November 28. The Detroit Lions hosted the Green Bay Packers in the early game at 12:30 pm EST, marking the Packers' 21st Thanksgiving game in Detroit. The Oakland Raiders visited the Dallas Cowboys in the late afternoon game at 3:30 pm CST. The evening game featured the defending Super Bowl champion Baltimore Ravens hosting their AFC North rival Pittsburgh Steelers at 8:30 pm EST.

The Buffalo Bills hosted the Atlanta Falcons in Toronto, Ontario, Canada on December 1. The game was played at Rogers Centre one week after the 101st Grey Cup ended the 2013 Canadian Football League season. On January 9, the Bills and Rogers Communications had announced a five-year extension of the Bills Toronto Series.

=== In-season scheduling changes ===
The following regular season games were moved either by way of flexible scheduling, severe weather, or for other reasons:

- Week 5: The San Diego–Oakland game was moved from 4:25 p.m. ET to 11:35 p.m. ET. The Raiders' Major League Baseball counterparts, the Oakland Athletics, hosted Game 2 of the 2013 American League Division Series on the previous night (October 5), and officials at O.co Coliseum needed almost 24 hours to convert the stadium from a baseball to a football configuration (O.co Coliseum was the last venue to host both an NFL and an MLB team before the Raiders moved to Las Vegas). The later start time also avoided a conflict with NBC's Sunday Night Football, where San Francisco hosted Houston at Candlestick Park across the San Francisco Bay at 8:40 p.m. ET. Additionally, the Chargers–Raiders game was televised on the NFL Network instead of CBS.
- Week 7: The Houston–Kansas City game was moved from 1:00 p.m. ET to 4:25 p.m. ET.
- Week 11: The Kansas City–Denver game, originally scheduled as CBS's only late 4:05 p.m. ET singleheader game, was flexed into the 8:30 p.m. ET slot on NBC Sunday Night Football. CBS originally selected this matchup as one of their "protected games" from flex-scheduling, but later allowed the league to flex it so it could be seen by a national audience. The original Sunday night contest, the Green Bay–New York Giants game, was then moved back to the 4:25 p.m. ET doubleheader time slot on Fox, while the San Diego–Miami game was moved from 1:00 p.m. ET to the 4:05 p.m. ET singleheader slot.
- Week 13: The Denver–Kansas City game was moved from 1:00 p.m. ET to 4:25 p.m. ET, while the New England–Houston game was switched from 4:25 p.m. ET to 1:00 p.m. ET.
- Week 14: The Carolina–New Orleans game, originally scheduled at 1:00 p.m. ET on Fox, was flexed into the 8:30 p.m. ET time slot on NBC. The original Sunday night contest, the Atlanta–Green Bay game, was then changed to 1:00 p.m. ET on Fox. It was the second time the Packers were stripped of a prime-time appearance this season, large in-part due to an injury sustained to Aaron Rodgers.
- Week 15: The New Orleans–St. Louis and Arizona–Tennessee games were moved from 1:00 p.m. ET to 4:25 p.m. ET.
- Week 16: The Chicago–Philadelphia game, originally scheduled at 1:00 p.m. ET on Fox, was flexed into the 8:30 p.m. ET time slot on NBC. Although the original Sunday night contest, the New England–Baltimore game, featured two playoff contending teams, it was moved to 4:25 p.m. ET to allow CBS to also air a more competitive game.
- Week 17: The Philadelphia–Dallas game, originally scheduled at 1:00 p.m. ET, was selected as the final NBC Sunday Night Football game, which for the third consecutive season decided the NFC East division champion. The Buffalo–New England game was moved to the 4:25 p.m. ET time slot on CBS while the Green Bay–Chicago game (which decided the NFC North division champion) and Tampa Bay–New Orleans game were moved to 4:25 p.m. ET on Fox.

== Regular season standings ==
=== Division ===
AFC East
	W	L	T	PCT	DIV	CONF	PF	PA	STK
^{(2)} New England Patriots	12	4	0	.750	4–2	9–3	444	338	W2
New York Jets	8	8	0	.500	3–3	5–7	290	387	W2
Miami Dolphins	8	8	0	.500	2–4	7–5	317	335	L2
Buffalo Bills	6	10	0	.375	3–3	5–7	339	388	L1

AFC North
	W	L	T	PCT	DIV	CONF	PF	PA	STK
^{(3)} Cincinnati Bengals	11	5	0	.688	3–3	8–4	430	305	W2
Pittsburgh Steelers	8	8	0	.500	4–2	6–6	379	370	W3
Baltimore Ravens	8	8	0	.500	3–3	6–6	320	352	L2
Cleveland Browns	4	12	0	.250	2–4	3–9	308	406	L7

AFC South
	W	L	T	PCT	DIV	CONF	PF	PA	STK
^{(4)} Indianapolis Colts	11	5	0	.688	6–0	9–3	391	336	W3
Tennessee Titans	7	9	0	.438	2–4	6–6	362	381	W2
Jacksonville Jaguars	4	12	0	.250	3–3	4–8	247	449	L3
Houston Texans	2	14	0	.125	1–5	2–10	276	428	L14

AFC West
	W	L	T	PCT	DIV	CONF	PF	PA	STK
^{(1)} Denver Broncos	13	3	0	.813	5–1	9–3	606	399	W2
^{(5)} Kansas City Chiefs	11	5	0	.688	2–4	7–5	430	305	L2
^{(6)} San Diego Chargers	9	7	0	.563	4–2	6–6	396	348	W4
Oakland Raiders	4	12	0	.250	1–5	4–8	322	453	L6

NFC East
	W	L	T	PCT	DIV	CONF	PF	PA	STK
^{(3)} Philadelphia Eagles	10	6	0	.625	4–2	9–3	442	382	W2
Dallas Cowboys	8	8	0	.500	5–1	7–5	439	432	L1
New York Giants	7	9	0	.438	3–3	6–6	294	383	W2
Washington Redskins	3	13	0	.188	0–6	1–11	334	478	L8

NFC North
	W	L	T	PCT	DIV	CONF	PF	PA	STK
^{(4)} Green Bay Packers	8	7	1	.531	3–2–1	6–5–1	417	428	W1
Chicago Bears	8	8	0	.500	2–4	4–8	445	478	L2
Detroit Lions	7	9	0	.438	4–2	6–6	395	376	L4
Minnesota Vikings	5	10	1	.344	2–3–1	4–7–1	391	480	W1

NFC South
	W	L	T	PCT	DIV	CONF	PF	PA	STK
^{(2)} Carolina Panthers	12	4	0	.750	5–1	9–3	366	241	W3
^{(6)} New Orleans Saints	11	5	0	.688	5–1	9–3	414	304	W1
Atlanta Falcons	4	12	0	.250	1–5	3–9	353	443	L2
Tampa Bay Buccaneers	4	12	0	.250	1–5	2–10	288	389	L3

NFC West
	W	L	T	PCT	DIV	CONF	PF	PA	STK
^{(1)} Seattle Seahawks	13	3	0	.813	4–2	10–2	417	231	W1
^{(5)} San Francisco 49ers	12	4	0	.750	5–1	9–3	406	272	W6
Arizona Cardinals	10	6	0	.625	2–4	6–6	379	324	L1
St. Louis Rams	7	9	0	.438	1–5	4–8	348	364	L1

=== Conference ===
AFC
#	Team	Division	W	L	T	PCT	DIV	CONF	SOS	SOV	STK
Division winners
1	Denver Broncos	West	13	3	0	.813	5–1	9–3	.469	.423	W2
2	New England Patriots	East	12	4	0	.750	4–2	9–3	.473	.427	W2
3 (Note: Cincinnati defeated Indianapolis head-to-head (Week 14, 42–28).)	Cincinnati Bengals	North	11	5	0	.688	3–3	8–4	.480	.494	W2
4	Indianapolis Colts	South	11	5	0	.688	6–0	9–3	.484	.449	W3
Wild cards
5	Kansas City Chiefs	West	11	5	0	.688	2–4	7–5	.445	.335	L2
6	San Diego Chargers	West	9	7	0	.563	4–2	6–6	.496	.549	W4
Did not qualify for the postseason
7 (Note: Pittsburgh finished with a better division record than Baltimore.) (Note: Pittsburgh defeated the New York Jets head-to-head (Week 6, 19–6).)	Pittsburgh Steelers	North	8	8	0	.500	4–2	6–6	.469	.441	W3
8 (Note: Baltimore defeated the New York Jets head-to-head (Week 12, 19–3).)	Baltimore Ravens	North	8	8	0	.500	3–3	6–6	.484	.418	L2
9 (Note: The New York Jets finished with a better division record than Miami.)	New York Jets	East	8	8	0	.500	3–3	5–7	.488	.414	W2
10	Miami Dolphins	East	8	8	0	.500	2–4	7–5	.523	.523	L2
11	Tennessee Titans	South	7	9	0	.438	2–4	6–6	.504	.375	W2
12	Buffalo Bills	East	6	10	0	.375	3–3	5–7	.520	.500	L1
13 (Note: Oakland and Jacksonville finished with a better conference record than Cleveland.) (Note: Oakland defeated Jacksonville head-to-head (Week 2, 19–9).)	Oakland Raiders	West	4	12	0	.250	1–5	4–8	.523	.359	L6
14 (Note: Jacksonville defeated Cleveland head-to-head (Week 13, 32–28).)	Jacksonville Jaguars	South	4	12	0	.250	3–3	4–8	.504	.234	L3
15	Cleveland Browns	North	4	12	0	.250	2–4	3–9	.516	.477	L7
16	Houston Texans	South	2	14	0	.125	1–5	2–10	.559	.500	L14
Tiebreakers (Note: When breaking ties for three or more teams under the NFL's rules, they are first broken within divisions, then comparing only the highest ranked remaining team from each division.)

NFC
#	Team	Division	W	L	T	PCT	DIV	CONF	SOS	SOV	STK
Division winners
1	Seattle Seahawks	West	13	3	0	.813	4–2	10–2	.490	.445	W1
2	Carolina Panthers	South	12	4	0	.750	5–1	9–3	.494	.451	W3
3	Philadelphia Eagles	East	10	6	0	.625	4–2	9–3	.453	.391	W2
4	Green Bay Packers	North	8	7	1	.531	3–2–1	6–5–1	.453	.371	W1
Wild cards
5	San Francisco 49ers	West	12	4	0	.750	5–1	9–3	.494	.414	W6
6	New Orleans Saints	South	11	5	0	.688	5–1	9–3	.516	.455	W1
Did not qualify for the postseason
7	Arizona Cardinals	West	10	6	0	.625	2–4	6–6	.531	.444	L1
8 (Note: Chicago defeated Dallas head-to-head (Week 14, 45–28).)	Chicago Bears	North	8	8	0	.500	2–4	4–8	.465	.469	L2
9	Dallas Cowboys	East	8	8	0	.500	5–1	7–5	.484	.363	L1
10 (Note: The NY Giants and Detroit finished with a better conference record than St. Louis.) (Note: The NY Giants defeated Detroit head-to-head (Week 16, 23–20 (OT)).)	New York Giants	East	7	9	0	.438	3–3	6–6	.520	.366	W2
11 (Note: Detroit finished with a better conference record than St. Louis.)	Detroit Lions	North	7	9	0	.438	4–2	6–6	.457	.402	L4
12	St. Louis Rams	West	7	9	0	.438	1–5	4–8	.551	.446	L1
13	Minnesota Vikings	North	5	10	1	.344	2–3–1	4–7–1	.512	.450	W1
14 (Note: Atlanta finished with a better conference record than Tampa Bay.)	Atlanta Falcons	South	4	12	0	.250	1–5	3–9	.553	.313	L2
15	Tampa Bay Buccaneers	South	4	12	0	.250	1–5	2–10	.574	.391	L3
16	Washington Redskins	East	3	13	0	.188	0–6	1–11	.516	.438	L8
Tiebreakers (Note: When breaking ties for three or more teams under the NFL's rules, they are first broken within divisions, then comparing only the highest-ranked remaining team from each division.)

== Postseason ==
Wild card round

The wild card round of the playoffs featured the two wild card playoff qualifiers from each conference being hosted by the two lowest seeded divisional winners. The top two seeds in each conference – the Seahawks, Panthers, Broncos and Patriots – all had first-round byes. The games were played January 4–5, 2014.

The weekend's first game on Saturday featured the Colts staging the second biggest comeback in playoff history to defeat the Chiefs by a score of 45–44. The 28-point second half deficit the Colts overcame is exceeded only by the Bills–Oilers playoff game from January 1993 which has become known simply as "The Comeback". It was the first time in any NFL game (regular or postseason) that a team won in regulation play (i.e. not overtime) after having trailed by as many as 28 points. The game was also the highest scoring postseason game to have been decided by a one-point margin as well as the first game in league history to finish with a 45–44 result. The Colts and Chiefs combined to gain 1,049 total yards which established a new single-game postseason record, breaking the record of 1,038 yards that was set by the Bills–Dolphins first-round game on December 30, 1995, and matched in a Saints–Lions first-round matchup on January 7, 2012. The loss was the Chiefs' eighth straight in the playoffs which broke an NFL record for consecutive playoff losses the franchise had previously shared with the Lions.

The Saints beat the Eagles 26–24 in the Saturday night game. It was the Saints' first ever road playoff victory. The Saints built an early 20–7 lead before the Eagles bounced back to take a 24–23 lead with less than five minutes remaining in the game. However, the Saints worked their way down the field while also working the clock on the game's final drive before Shayne Graham kicked the game-winning field goal from 32 yards out as time expired.

The early game on Sunday was the only game of the weekend not decided by three or fewer points with the Chargers defeating the Bengals, 27–10. Bengals quarterback Andy Dalton committed three second-half turnovers which led to the Chargers scoring 20 unanswered points to overcome a 7–10 halftime deficit. The Bengals loss marks a league record third straight year in which the team has lost its playoff opener, and extended the Bengals' streak of playoff futility to 23 seasons. Every other current NFL team has won a playoff game since the Bengals' last playoff victory in January 1991.

In the late afternoon game on Sunday the 49ers defeated the Packers 23–20 on a brutally cold day at Lambeau Field. The temperature at game time was just 5 °F (−15 °C) with a wind chill of −10 °F (−23 °C). Quarterback Colin Kaepernick, who eschewed sleeves and gloves despite the chilly conditions, passed for 227 yards and rushed for 98 more to lead the 49ers to victory in a back-and-forth game. Phil Dawson kicked the winning field goal as time expired. This was the second straight year that the Packers' season had both started and ended with losses to the 49ers.

Divisional round

The divisional round games were played on January 11–12, 2014 and three of the four were rematches of regular season games – only the Patriots and Colts had not met in 2013.

In the early game on Saturday, the Seahawks defeated the Saints 23–15. The Seahawks held a 16–0 lead at halftime, but the Saints came back in the second half to make the game interesting. The Seahawks were able to hold on after a late Saints comeback effort, including an onside kick recovery, fell short. The Seahawks' offense centered around a 28 carry, 140 yard rushing effort from Marshawn Lynch, who also scored on a 31-yard run in the fourth quarter.

Patriots running back LeGarrette Blount and the Patriots defense were the stars of the Patriots 43–22 victory over the Colts in the Saturday night game. Blount rushed for 166 yards and a franchise-record four touchdowns while Colts quarterback Andrew Luck was intercepted four times. Patriots quarterback Tom Brady broke a league record for most playoff games for a starting quarterback with 25 (a record he had previously shared with Brett Favre) and extended his own record of 18 career playoff wins. The victory allowed the Patriots to reach the AFC Championship Game for the third straight year as well as the eighth time with Brady and head coach Bill Belichick. Belichick moved into a second-place tie with Don Shula on the all-time postseason head coaching wins list, one victory behind Tom Landry.

The 49ers defeated the Panthers by a score of 23–10 in the early Sunday game. The 49ers defense twice stopped the Panthers one yard short of the end zone and also recorded two interceptions and five quarterback sacks. 49ers quarterback Colin Kaepernick threw for one touchdown and ran for another in the game. The win put the 49ers into their third straight and fifteenth overall conference championship game, matching the Pittsburgh Steelers for most conference championship appearances. Jim Harbaugh became the first head coach in NFL history to take his team to the conference championship game in each of his first three seasons.

In the final game of the divisional round the Broncos beat the Chargers 24–17. It was only the fourth time in the season to date that the Broncos had been held to fewer than 30 points (three of which were against the Chargers), but the Chargers offense could not capitalize. The Broncos held a 17–0 lead in the fourth quarter before the Chargers launched a comeback that was too little and too late. The win put the Broncos into the AFC championship game for the first time since the 2005 season.

Conference championships

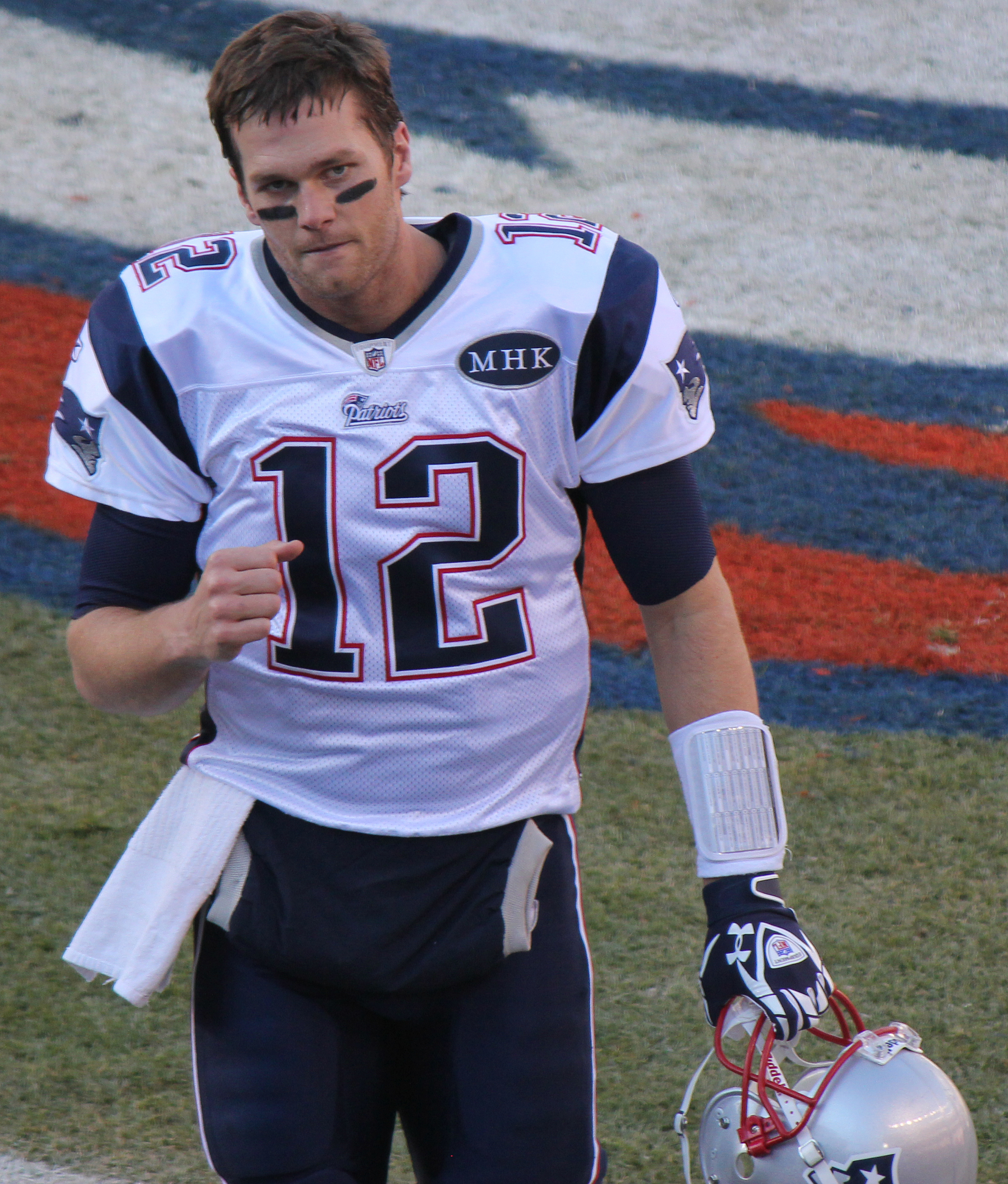
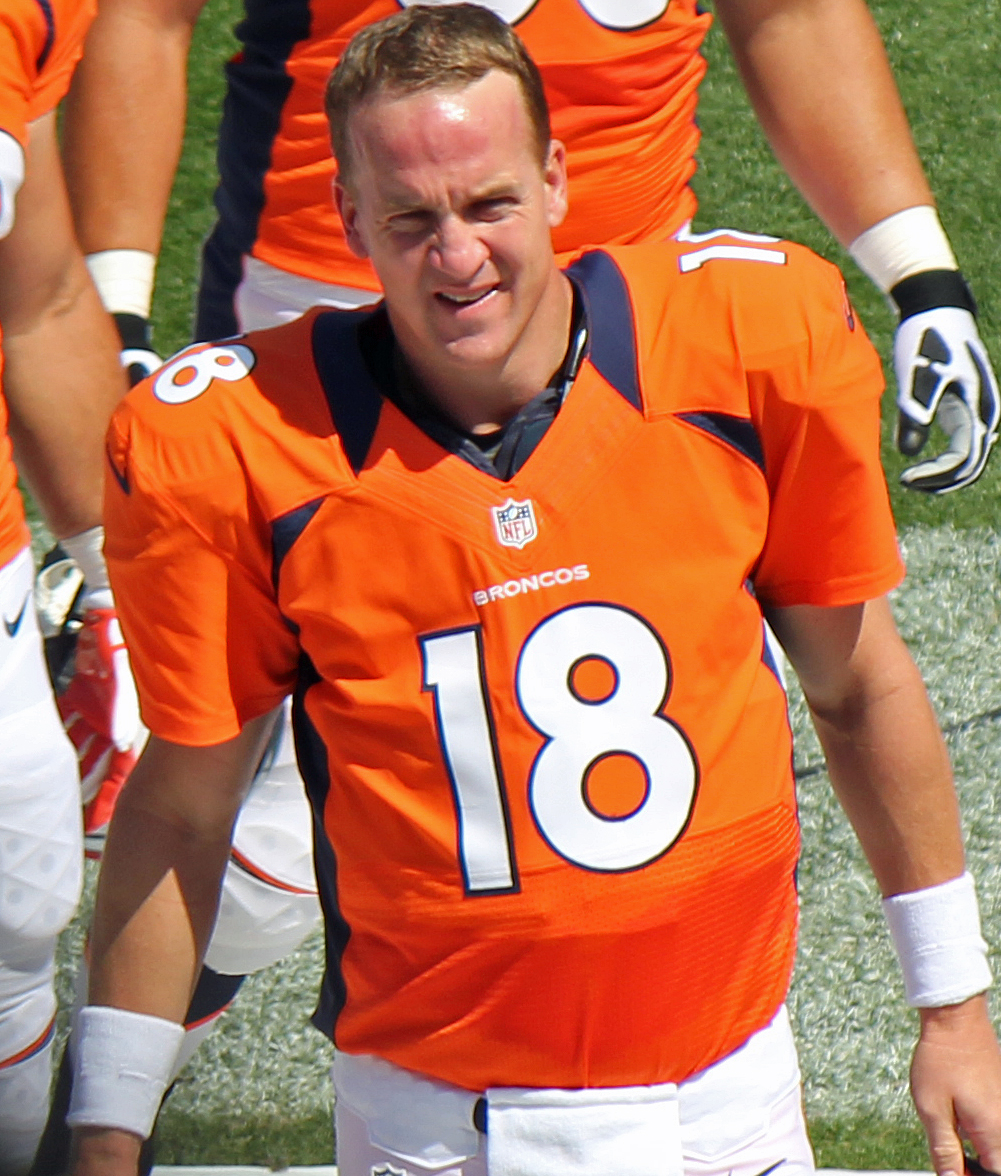
In the AFC Championship Game Tom Brady (left) and Peyton Manning (right) met for the 15th time

The conference championships took place on Sunday, January 19, 2014.

The early game featured the Broncos hosting the Patriots in the AFC Championship Game. The game was referred to by many as Manning-Brady XV as it was the fifteenth meeting (the fourth in the playoffs) of the two starting quarterbacks, Tom Brady and Peyton Manning. The Broncos defeated Brady and the Patriots 26–16 behind a 400-yard passing performance by Manning. Manning led the Broncos on two long touchdown drives where each used over seven minutes of game time and were the two longest drives in terms of game time of the Broncos season. This was Manning's third career postseason game with 400 or more yards passing, equaling Drew Brees for the most such playoff games in league history. Broncos head coach John Fox, who previously led the Carolina Panthers to Super Bowl XXXVIII in 2004, became the sixth head coach in NFL history to take two different franchises to the Super Bowl.

The NFC Championship Game had the Seahawks hosting the 49ers in the late game. The Seahawks defense forced three turnovers in the fourth quarter which proved to be the difference in the game. The last of these was a pass intended for Michael Crabtree in the endzone which was intercepted by Seahawks linebacker Malcolm Smith off a deflection by cornerback Richard Sherman with just 22 seconds remaining in the fourth quarter. The interception preserved a 23–17 Seahawks victory. In an on-field interview immediately after the game with Fox sideline reporter Erin Andrews, Sherman famously directed a rant at Crabtree whom Sherman called a "sorry receiver".

=== Super Bowl XLVIII ===
Super Bowl XLVIII featured the top seeded team from each conference for just the second time in twenty years. The Broncos possessed the league's best offense (in terms of both scoring and yards) while the Seahawks had the league's top defense (also in both scoring and yardage). The game was played on February 2, 2014, at MetLife Stadium in East Rutherford, New Jersey, just outside New York City and was televised in the U.S. by Fox with kickoff at 6:32 pm EST. This was the first ever Super Bowl to be staged outdoors in a cold weather environment although the temperature was a mild 49 degrees at kickoff.

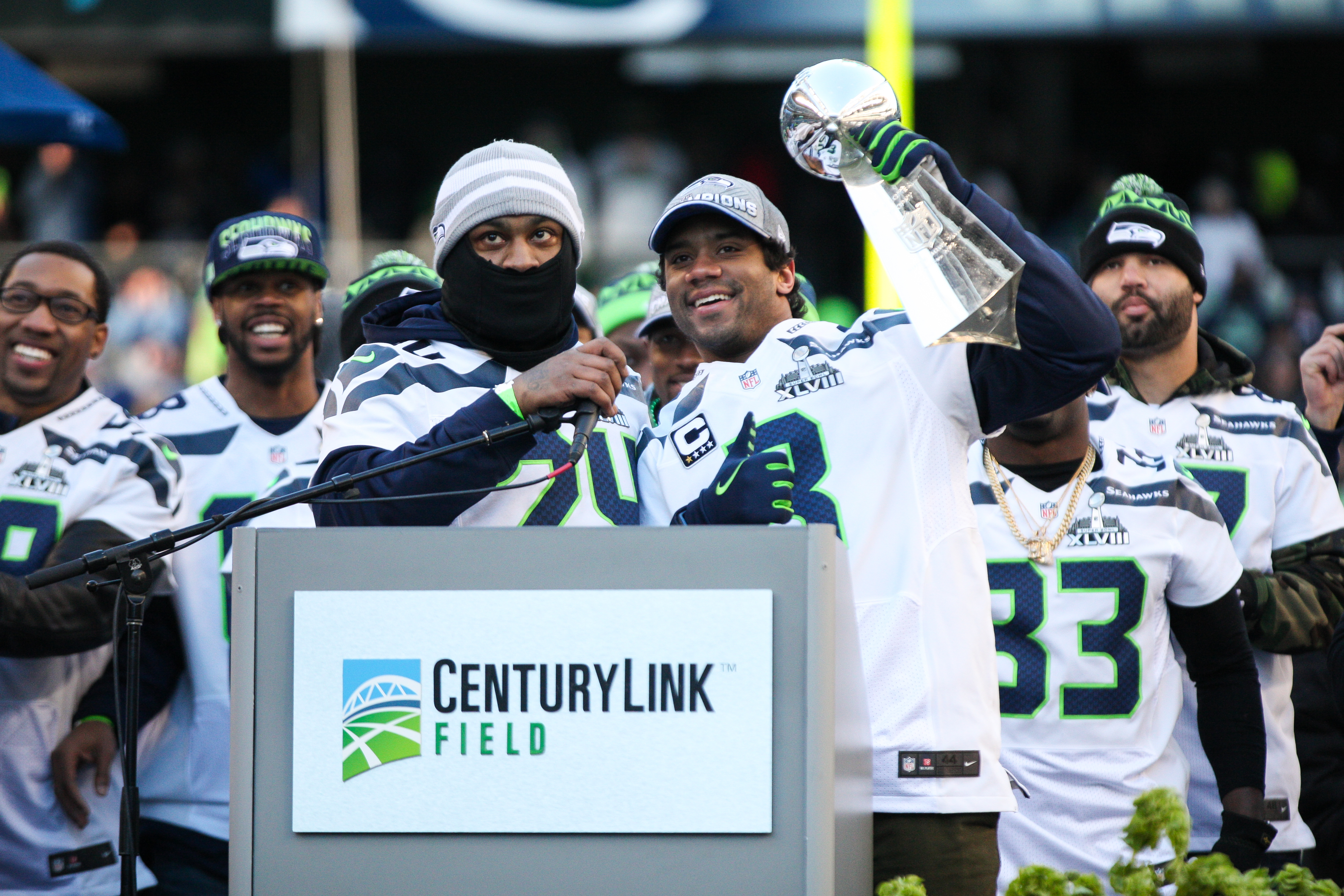
Russell Wilson and Marshawn Lynch with the Vince Lombardi Trophy at the CenturyLink Field in Seattle, February 5, 2014

The game started disastrously for the Broncos who, despite losing the coin toss, received the opening kickoff. On the game's first play from scrimmage from the Broncos' 14 yard line, Broncos center Manny Ramirez sent a shotgun snap over the head of quarterback Peyton Manning. The ball traveled into the endzone where it was covered by Broncos running back Knowshon Moreno who was touched down for a safety with just 12 seconds of game time elapsed. This was the quickest score ever in a Super Bowl. The Seahawks did not relinquish the lead in a 43–8 victory.

This was the Seahawks first ever league championship since entering the NFL in 1976. Seahawks linebacker Malcolm Smith, who scored on a 69-yard interception return plus had a fumble recovery and tallied 10 tackles, was named the game's Most Valuable Player (MVP).

This was the fifth Super Bowl loss for the Broncos, the most for any franchise. Even in defeat, though, Peyton Manning's record-breaking year continued. He set a record for most passes completed in a Super Bowl with 34. He also moved ahead of Tom Brady into first place on the career playoff passing yardage list with 6,589 yards. In addition, Broncos wide receiver Demaryius Thomas caught 13 passes to set a single-game Super Bowl record.

=== Playoffs bracket ===
Jan 5 – Lambeau Field	Jan 12 – Bank of America Stadium
5	San Francisco	23
5	San Francisco	23
4	Green Bay	20	Jan 19 – CenturyLink Field
2	Carolina	10
NFC
Jan 4 – Lincoln Financial Field	5	San Francisco	17
Jan 11 – CenturyLink Field
1	Seattle	23
6	New Orleans	26	NFC Championship
6	New Orleans	15
3	Philadelphia	24	Feb 2 – MetLife Stadium
1	Seattle	23
Wild-card round
Divisional round
Jan 4 – Lucas Oil Stadium	N1	Seattle	43
Jan 11 – Gillette Stadium
A1	Denver	8
5	Kansas City	44	Super Bowl XLVIII
4	Indianapolis	22
4	Indianapolis	45	Jan 19 – Sports Authority Field at Mile High
2	New England	43
AFC
Jan 5 – Paul Brown Stadium	2	New England	16
Jan 12 – Sports Authority Field at Mile High
1	Denver	26
6	San Diego	27	AFC Championship
6	San Diego	17
3	Cincinnati	10
1	Denver	24

== Pro Bowl ==
The Pro Bowl is the league's all-star game. The league had raised doubts about the future of the exhibition due to concerns over the game's competitiveness in recent years, but on March 20, it was announced that the 2014 Pro Bowl would indeed take place, receiving a one-year reprieve. As in recent years, the game was held the week before the Super Bowl at Aloha Stadium in Honolulu, Hawaii. It was played on Sunday, January 26, and broadcast in the U.S. on NBC.

The format for the game was considerably altered in an effort to improve competitiveness. The biggest changes included an "unconferenced" format in which players would be selected regardless of the conference in which their team competes, a draft format to select the teams and various tweaks to increase the excitement of the game itself. Deion Sanders and Jerry Rice served as the non-playing captains for the two competing squads.

== Notable events ==
Some NFL-related events that made headlines throughout 2013 include:

Harris Poll tabs professional football as America's favorite sport

A nationwide poll conducted by Harris Interactive in December 2013 concluded that pro football is the favorite sport of Americans. Of the respondents asked the question, "If you had to choose, which ONE of these sports would you say is your favorite?", 35% chose pro football. That is up by one percentage point over the results of the previous year. Football has taken the top spot in the annual poll each year since it was first conducted in 1985. Baseball finished second, with 14% naming it as their favorite, followed by college football at 11%.

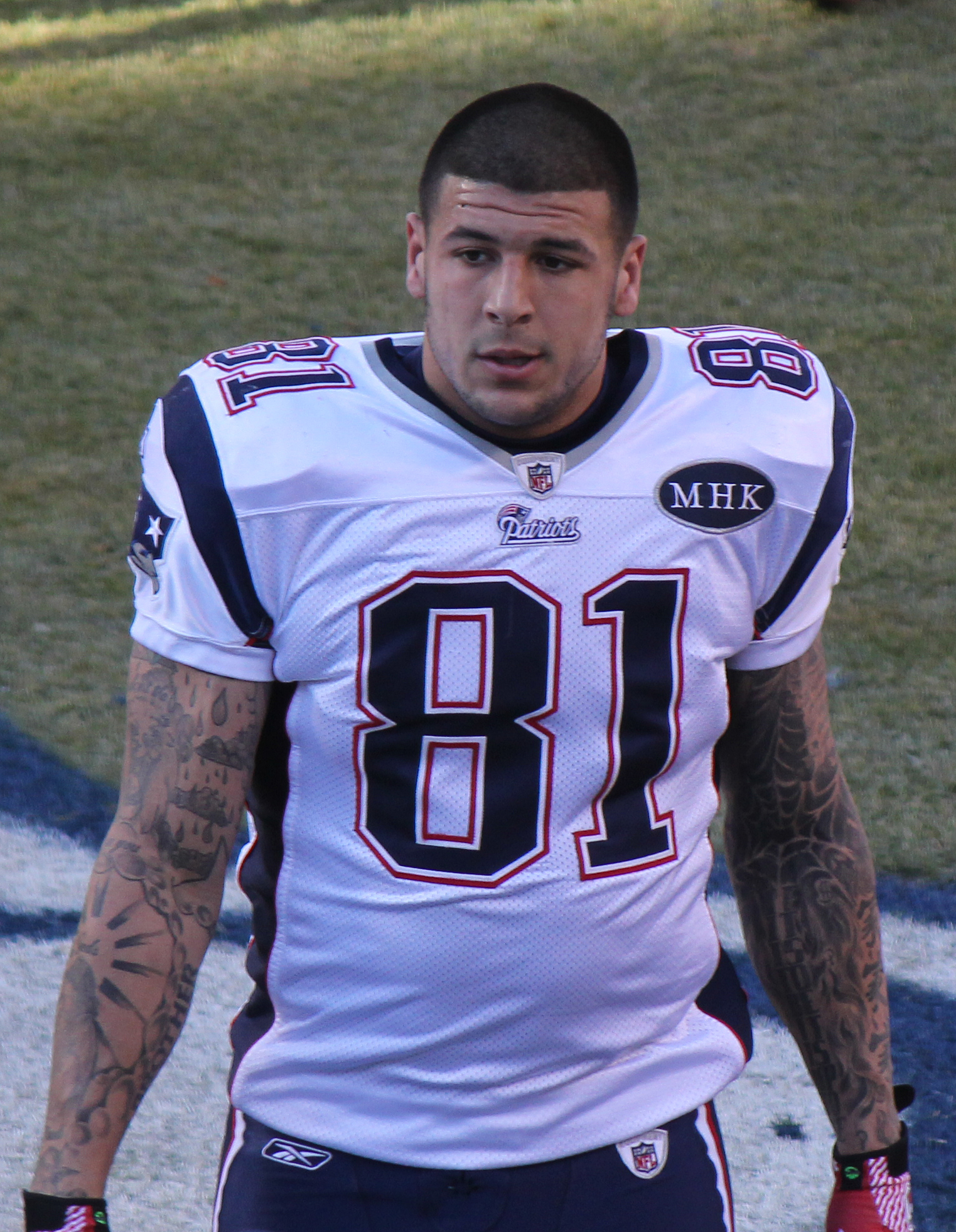
Former Patriots tight end Aaron Hernandez

Aaron Hernandez charged with murder

In August, former Patriots tight end Aaron Hernandez was charged with the murder of Odin Lloyd. Hernandez was released by the Patriots following his arrest in the murder investigation in June. In an effort to further distance themselves from the troubled Hernandez, the Patriots offered fans an opportunity to trade-in Hernandez jerseys for another jersey of comparable value. Hernandez would be convicted of the murder charge and sentenced to life imprisonment in April 2015.

Riley Cooper incident

Eagles wide receiver Riley Cooper was caught on video using a racial slur during a music concert. After the video went viral during the team's training camp, Cooper was briefly sent away from the team to seek counseling. The Eagles also levied an undisclosed fine.

Concussion litigation brought by former players

In August, just prior to the start of the season, a US$765,000,000 settlement proposal was announced in a class-action lawsuit brought against the league by former players who contended that the league concealed a link between head injuries sustained by players and traumatic brain injury which may only become apparent later in life. The judge in the case later rejected the settlement on the grounds that the amount may not be large enough to cover the needs of all the plaintiffs.

Buccaneers release quarterback Josh Freeman in mid-season

In October, the Buccaneers released quarterback Josh Freeman after trying unsuccessfully to trade him. Freeman had been considered one of the league's best young quarterbacks after leading the Bucs to a 10–6 record in 2010, but he clashed with head coach Greg Schiano (who took over in 2012) and was benched earlier in the year. Despite being just 25 years old, Freeman held franchise records for touchdowns and completions and was second in passing yardage. It had come out earlier in the week that Freeman had been in the league's substance abuse program; Freeman described his participation as voluntary and a result of prescription drugs he was taking to treat ADHD. Shortly after his release, Freeman was signed by the Vikings. Freeman started for the Vikings in week seven, but he posted a passer rating of just 40.6 in that game and did not play another down during the season. He was inactive for nine of the Vikings' final ten games.

Tampa Bay MRSA outbreak

Three Buccaneers players – kicker Lawrence Tynes, guard Carl Nicks and cornerback Johnthan Banks – were diagnosed with methicillin-resistant Staphylococcus aureus (MRSA) infections during the season. The potentially deadly strain of staph had been encountered by other NFL teams including the Washington Redskins, St. Louis Rams and Cleveland Browns in previous seasons. After the third infection was confirmed there was brief discussion as to whether the Bucs' week six home game against the Eagles would be played, but the decision was made to continue with the scheduled game. The Falcons even took the step of bringing in a hazardous materials crew to disinfect the visitor's locker room after the Bucs' visited Atlanta in week seven.

Dolphins bullying scandal

Dolphins offensive lineman Richie Incognito was suspended by the team in November after allegations surfaced that he bullied fellow lineman Jonathan Martin who left the team earlier in the season due to the impact of Incognito's actions.

The league's official investigation into the matter concluded that Martin and other Dolphins employees had been subjected to a "pattern of harassment" at the hands of Incognito as well as fellow linemen John Jerry and Mike Pouncey. The 144-page report, written by league-appointed investigator Ted Wells, called the situation a "classic case of bullying". The report also implicated Dolphins offensive line coach Jim Turner in some of the abuse; Turner was fired by the team shortly after the report's release.

Redskins shut down quarterback Robert Griffin III for season's final three games

Redskins head coach Mike Shanahan made a decision to bench the team's franchise quarterback, Robert Griffin III for the team's final three games of the 2013 season. Griffin had undergone knee surgery after being injured the previous season in which he was named NFL Offensive Rookie of the Year after being selected second overall in the 2012 draft. Griffin was much less productive in his second season. Shanahan stated that the decision to start Kirk Cousins over Griffin was made to protect Griffin from sustaining another injury, although there was speculation that Shanahan was unhappy about Griffin's friendly relationship with team owner Daniel Snyder. Shanahan was fired after the season ended.

Seahawks quarterback Russell Wilson leads all players in licensed product sales

Russell Wilson the second-year quarterback of the Super Bowl champion Seahawks led all NFL players in terms of total licensed product sales (jerseys, T-shirts, figurines, photos, etc.) made from March 2013 through February 2014. The top six players on the list were quarterbacks, including, in order, Peyton Manning (who held the top spot the previous year), Colin Kaepernick, Robert Griffin III, Aaron Rodgers and Tom Brady. The only non-quarterback in the top 10 was Wilson's Seahawks teammate, running back Marshawn Lynch.

Deacon Jones's death

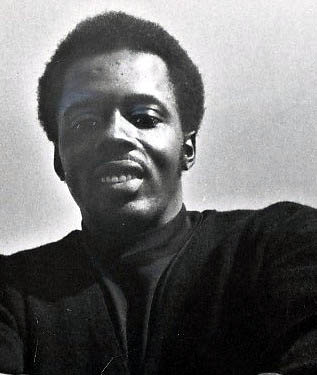
Deacon Jones in 1971.

Legendary Hall of Fame defensive lineman Deacon Jones died in June. Shortly thereafter the league honored Jones' legacy by creating the "Deacon Jones Award" to be given annually to the player who records the most quarterback sacks. Colts linebacker Robert Mathis was the inaugural winner of the honor, and Trey Hendrickson is the current holder.

Bud Adams's death

Tennessee Titans owner Kenneth S. "Bud" Adams died in October. He was the only owner the franchise, which began in 1960 as the Houston Oilers in the AFL, has ever had. Adams was a second-generation oil tycoon who made his home in Houston, Texas. The team was inherited in equal parts by the families of Adams's three children with Adams's son-in-law Tommy Smith succeeding Adams as the president and CEO of the franchise.

Other 2013 deaths

Aside from those mentioned above, the following people associated with the NFL died in 2013:

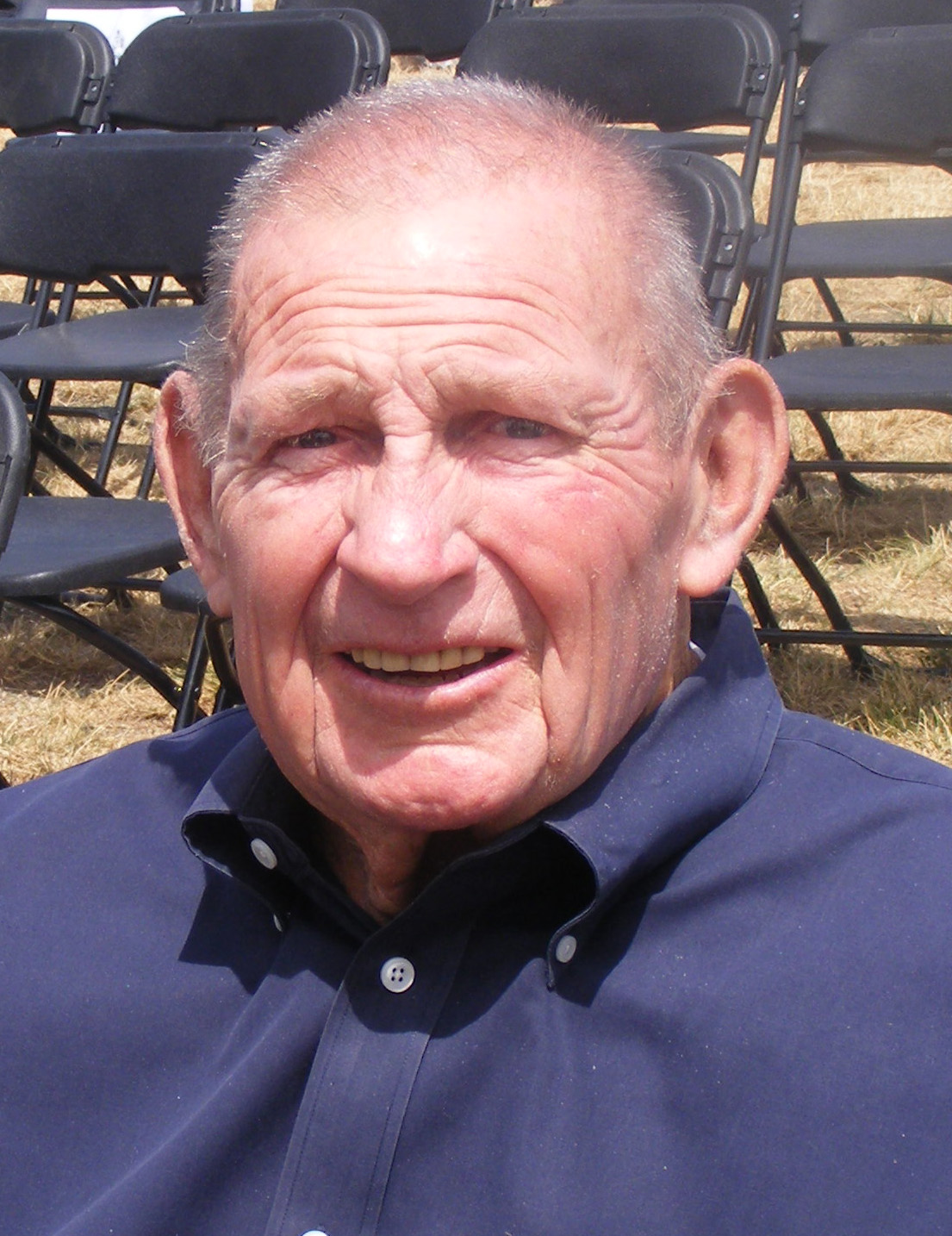
Art Donovan

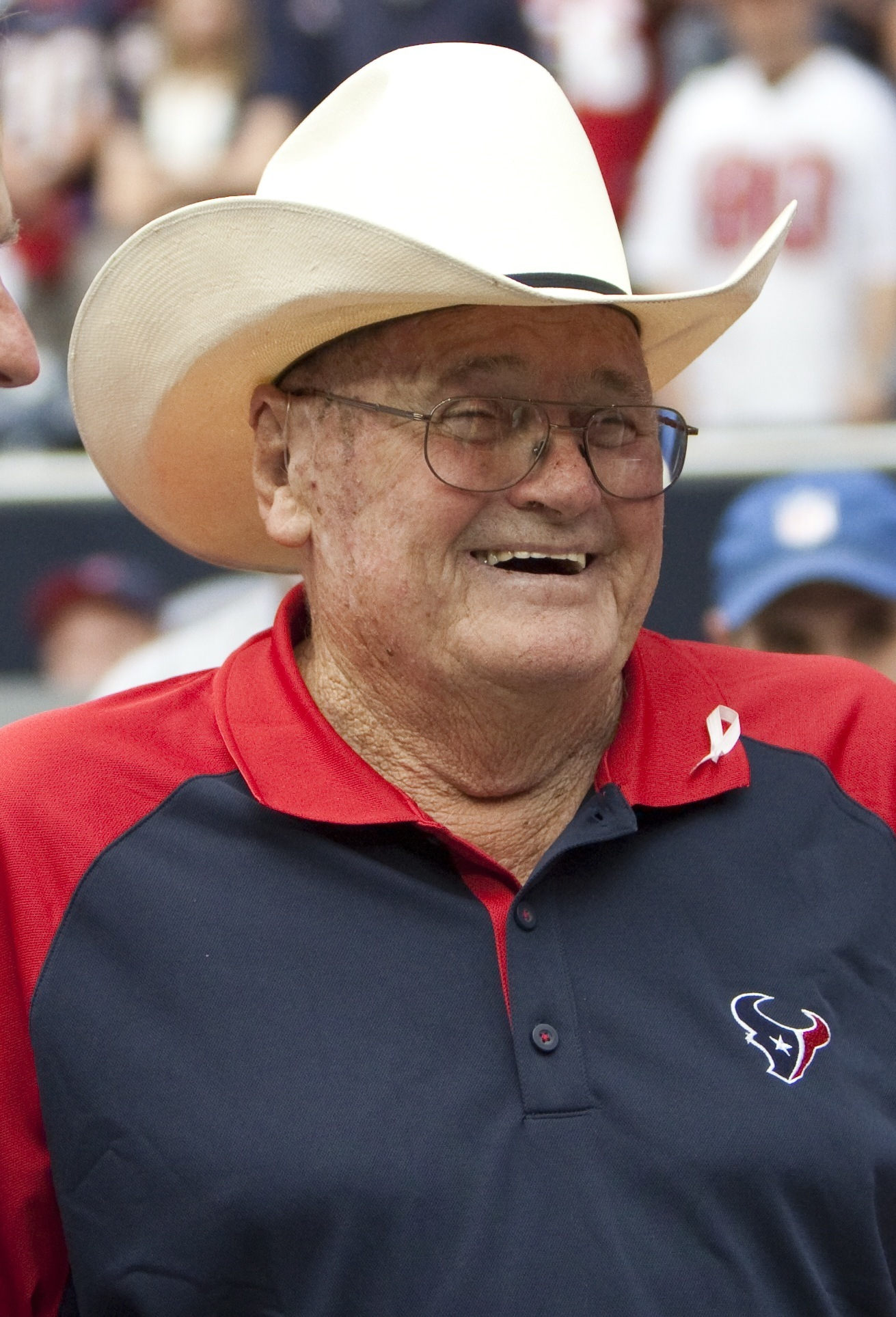
Bum Phillips with former U.S. President George H. W. Bush

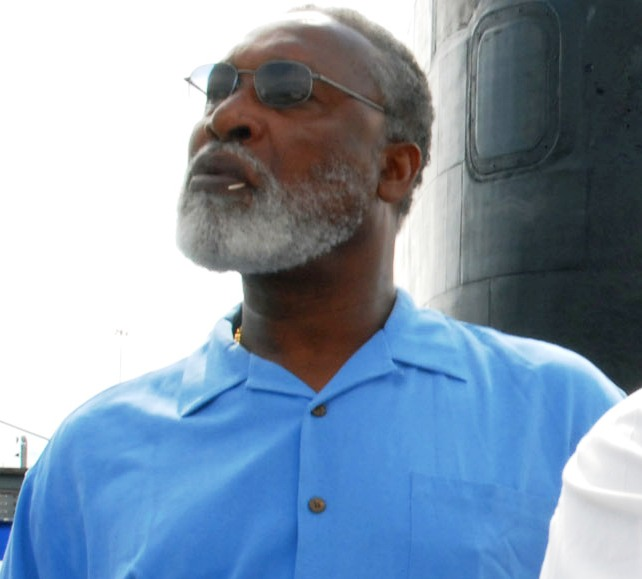
L. C. Greenwood

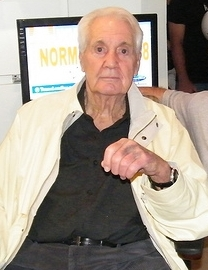
Pat Summerall

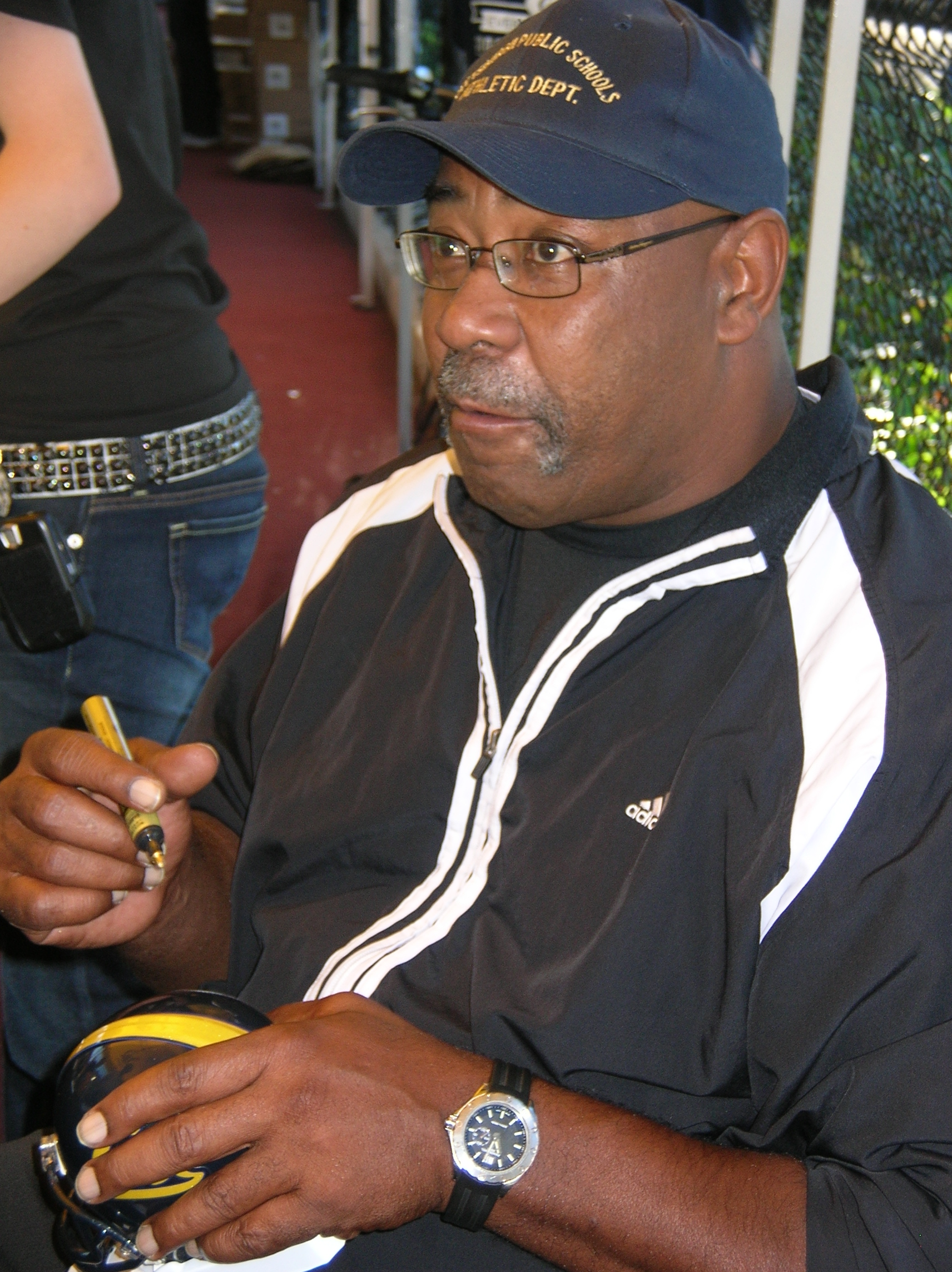
Chuck Muncie

- Scott Adams
- Tom Alberghini
- Bill Albright
- John Alderton
- Bud Asher
- Bill Austin
- Jim Barton
- Bob Beeks (former official)
- Hezekiah Braxton
- Don Brown
- George Brown (1949 New York Yankees of the AAFC)
- Tom Brown
- Ted Burgmeier (1987 Kansas City Chiefs)
- Jack Butler
- Jim Canady (1948 Chicago Bears)
- Rick Casares
- Jim Cason
- Frank Chamberlin
- Todd Christensen
- Ken Clark
- Walt Clay (1946 Chicago Rockets of the AAFC)
- Ray Coates (1949 N.Y. Giants)
- Angelo Coia
- Fred Cole (L.A. Chargers)
- Dave Costa
- Bobby Crespino
- Billy Cross
- Jack Davis
- Art DeCarlo
- Jack Del Bello (1953 Baltimore Colts)
- Burt Delavan (1955 Chicago Cardinals)
- Frank Dempsey
- John Didion
- Art Donovan
- Walt Dubzinski (1944 Boston Yanks)*
- Dick Duden
- Ron Duncan (1967 Cleveland Browns)
- Jeff Durkota (1948 Los Angeles Dons of the AAFC)
- Walt Easley
- Allan Ellis
- Dick Evey
- Chuck Fairbanks
- Joe Francis
- Willie Frazier
- Sonny Gandee
- Frank Gaul
- Ronnie Goodwin (1964 Philadelphia Eagles)
- L. C. Greenwood
- Glynn Gregory (1961 Dallas Texans)
- Earl Gros
- Bob Heck (1949 Chicago Hornets)
- Robert "Bob" Hecker (1952 L.A. Rams)
- Carey Henley (1962 Buffalo Bills)
- Tom Higgins, Sr. (1955 Philadelphia Eagles
- Harlon Hill
- John Holt
- Thomas Howard
- Jim Hudson
- Ken Hutcherson
- John Idzik
- Claudis James
- Dave Jennings
- Fred Julian
- Bob Kahler
- Dave Kocourek
- Johnny Kovatch
- Chester "Chet" Lagod (1953 N.Y. Giants)
- Mike LaHood (1969 L.A. Rams)
- Dave Leggett
- Jimmy Lesane (1952 Chicago Bears)
- Jeff Lewis
- Toni Linhart
- Bob Livingstone (1948 Chicago Rockets of the AAFC)
- Tony Lorick
- John Maczuzak (1964 Kansas City Chiefs)
- Errol Mann
- Lew Mayne
- John Mazur
- Frank Maznicki
- Geno Mazzanti (1950 Baltimore Colts)
- Darris McCord
- John McCormick
- Mike McCormack
- Greg McCrary
- David McMillan
- Bronzell Miller
- Bert Milling (1942 Philadelphia Eagles)
- Norm Mosley (1948 Pittsburgh Steelers)
- Chuck Muncie
- Hamilton Nichols
- Rick Norton
- Bob Oliver (1969 Cleveland Browns)
- Paul Oliver
- Jack Pardee
- Clarence "Ace" Parker
- Francis Peay
- Tom Pennington
- Bum Phillips
- Gordon Polofsky (1954 Chicago Cardinals)
- Jim Powers
- Ben Pucci
- John Reger
- Ernie Richardson (1974 Cleveland Browns)
- Jerry Robinson
- Reggie Rogers
- Curtis Rouse
- Marion Rushing
- Tino Sabuco
- George Saimes
- George Sauer, Jr.
- Harry Schuh
- Jerry Seeman
- Pat Shea
- Ed Shedlosky (1945 N.Y. Giants)
- Brian Sisley (1987 N.Y. Giants)
- Charles Smith (1947 Chicago Cardinals)
- Harry Smith
- Ron Smith
- John Sokolosky (1978 Detroit Lions)
- Lou Spadia (former team scout)
- Bryan Stoltenberg
- Roy Stuart
- Pat Summerall
- Jim Sweeney
- Walt Sweeney
- Joe Tereshinski Sr.
- Bobby Thomason
- Frank Tripucka
- Bill Troup
- Val Joe Walker
- Art Weiner
- Wilford White
- John Wilbur
- John F. Wiley
- Mike Williams (1980 Kansas City Chiefs)
- Sam Williams
- Ray Willsey
- Jerry Wolman former owner of the Philadelphia Eagles
- Will Wynn
- Bob Yates
- Dick Yelvington
- Glenn Young (former minority owner and general manager of the San Francisco 49ers)

== Records, milestones, and notable statistics ==
The 2013 season saw a number of league records set, most notably:

- A record 11,985 points were scored during the season, with games averaging 46.8 points, the highest average in NFL history. The previous record of 46.5 points per game was set in 1948.
- A total of 1,338 total touchdowns were scored, surpassing the league-wide record of 1,297, which occurred in 2012.
- A record 863 field goals were made this season, surpassing the record of 852 set in 2012. Also, kickers converted a record 86.5% of their field goal attempts breaking the record of 84.5% set during the 2008 season.
- Peyton Manning set the record for most passing yards in a season, with 5,477. The previous record of 5,476 was held by Drew Brees.
- Manning also set the record for most touchdown passes in a season, with 55. The previous record of 50 was held by Tom Brady.
- The Denver Broncos set the record for most points in a season, with 606. The previous record of 589 was held by the 2007 New England Patriots. The Broncos outscored the next highest scoring team (the Chicago Bears) by 161 points, or more than ten points per game.
- Eleven teams scored at least 400 points this season, setting a record. The previous record of nine teams was set in 2008 and 2012.
- Andrew Luck set the record for most passing yards in a player's first two seasons, with 8,196. The previous record was held by Cam Newton.
- The Denver Broncos became the first team to have five players score at least ten touchdowns in the same season: Demaryius Thomas (14), Knowshon Moreno (13), Julius Thomas (12), Eric Decker (11) and Wes Welker (10). No team had previously had more than three such players.
- Tom Brady extended his record for the most division titles for a starting quarterback, with 11.
- Andre Johnson, of the tied the record for most seasons with at least 100 receptions, with five, sharing the record with Wes Welker.
- Peyton Manning set a record for most touchdown passes without an interception to start a season with 20.
- John Hekker of set a single season record with an average of 44.2 net yards per punt, The previous record of 44.0 yards was held by Andy Lee.

Week 1

- Peyton Manning tied the record for most passing touchdowns in a game, with seven, sharing the record with five other players.
- Manning set the record for most career games with at least six touchdown passes, with three. He shared the previous record of two with George Blanda, Charley Johnson, and Y.A. Tittle.

Week 2

- Peyton Manning became the third player with 60,000 passing yards in a career, joining Brett Favre and Dan Marino. Manning achieved the mark in his 226th game, making him the fastest to reach the milestone.

Week 4

- Blair Walsh set the record for most consecutive 50+ yard field goals made without a miss, with 12. He previously shared the record with Robbie Gould and Tony Zendejas.
- Matthew Stafford set the record for most passing yards in a player's first 50 games, with 13,976. The previous record of 13,864 was held by Kurt Warner.

Week 5

- Peyton Manning set the record for most touchdown passes before his first interception of the season, with 20. The previous record of 16 was held by Milt Plum. Manning's 20 touchdown passes through five games are also a league record. In addition, the 414 yards passing Manning compiled bring his career total to 61,371 eclipsing Dan Marino for second place on the career passing yardage list behind only Brett Favre.
- Charles Woodson tied the record for most defensive touchdowns in a career, with 13, sharing the Darren Sharper and Rod Woodson.

Week 6

- Robbie Gould tied the record for most consecutive 50+ yard field goals made without a miss, with 12, sharing the record with Blair Walsh.
- The Denver Broncos and Kansas City Chiefs each started the season 6–0, making this just the second time since the introduction of the division format in 1933 that two teams from the same division have maintained perfect records through six games. The only other pair of teams to have achieved this feat are the 1934 Chicago Bears and Detroit Lions which each made it to 10–0.
- Reggie Wayne caught five passes to become the ninth player to have 1,000 receptions.
- The Indianapolis Colts became the first team to have two players with 1,000 receptions: Wayne and Marvin Harrison.

Week 7

- Tony Romo set the record for most passing yards in a quarterback's first 100 starts, with 27,485 .

Week 8

- Vikings kick returner Cordarrelle Patterson set a league record for the longest kickoff return at 109 yards. This return also ties the record for longest play of any type.
- Terrelle Pryor set the record for longest run by a quarterback, with a 93-yard run.
- Larry Fitzgerald of the Cardinals became the youngest player to have 800 receptions, at age 30 years, 57 days.

Week 9

- Nick Foles tied the record for most touchdown passes in a game, with seven, sharing the record with six other players. He is the first player to accomplish this feat while attaining a perfect passer rating for the game.

Week 10

- The New Orleans Saints set a record for most first downs in a game, with 40. The previous record of 39 was held by the 1988 New York Jets.

Week 11

- London Fletcher set the record for most consecutive starts by a linebacker, with 209. The previous record of 208 was held by Derrick Brooks.
- Tom Brady became the sixth player in NFL history to reach 4,000 career passes completed.

Week 12

- Larry Fitzgerald set the record for youngest player to reach 11,000 receiving yards, at age 30 years, 85 days. The previous record of 30 years, 222 days, was held by Randy Moss.
- Linebacker Robert Mathis of the Colts recorded his 40th strip/sack against the Cardinals. This set a new record, passing Jason Taylor for most strip/sacks in NFL history.
- The Minnesota Vikings and Green Bay Packers and Minnesota Vikings played to a 26–26 tie. This was the first tie game in which both teams scored in the overtime period.

Week 13

- Josh Gordon became the first player to have at least 200 receiving yards in two consecutive games.
- Gordon and Alshon Jeffery each had at least ten receptions and 200 yards, and two touchdowns. This marked the first time in which two players reached these marks on the same day.
- Tom Brady set the record for most touchdown passes for a player under the leadership of a single head coach with his 353rd touchdown under Bill Belichick. The previous record of 352 was held by Dan Marino under Don Shula.
- Adam Vinatieri became the second player to score at least 800 points with two different franchises, joining Morten Andersen.
- Vinitieri also tied the record for most seasons scoring at least 100 points, with 16, sharing the record with Jason Elam.

Week 14

- Matt Prater set the record for longest field goal, with a 64-yard kick. The previous record of 63 yards was shared by four players.
- Drew Brees became the fifth player to reach 50,000 career passing yards. Brees became the fastest to reach the milestone, doing so in 183 games. The previous record of 191 games was held by Peyton Manning.
- With his seventh game of the year with four or more touchdown passes, Peyton Manning set an NFL record for most such games in a season. He broke the record set in 1984 by Dan Marino and equaled by Manning himself in 2004.

Week 15

- All teams playing on Sunday, December 15, combined to score 763 points, setting a record for most points scored in a single day. The previous record of 759 points occurred on January 1, 2012.
- Jamaal Charles became the first running back in NFL history with four receiving touchdowns in one game. He also became the first player at any position to have four receiving touchdowns and a rushing touchdown in the same game.
- Tony Gonzalez became the first tight end and the fifth player overall in NFL history to reach 15,000 receiving yards.
- Calvin Johnson became the first player to have 5,000 receiving yards in a three-season span (2011–2013).

Week 16

- Luke Kuechly tied the record for most tackles in a game, with 24 (since tackles became an official stat in 1994), sharing the record with David Harris.

Wild card round

- The Indianapolis Colts achieved the second-largest comeback win in a postseason game, erasing a 28-point deficit against the Kansas City Chiefs. It was the first time in any NFL game (regular or postseason) that a team won in regulation play after having trailed by at least 28 points.
- The Colts and Chiefs set the record record for most combined total yards in a payoff game, with 1,049. The previous record of 1,038 yards was shared by the 1995 Miami Dolphins and Buffalo Bills and the 2011 Detroit Lions and New Orleans Saints.
- The Chiefs set a record for the longest losing streak in postseason games, with eight. They shared the previous record of seven with the Detroit Lions.

Divisional round

- Tom Brady set the record for most postseason starts by a quarterback, with his 25th start. He shared the previous record of 24 with Brett Favre.
- LeGarrette Blount became the first player to rush for at least 125 yards and four touchdowns in a postseason game.

Conference championship games

- The San Francisco 49ers tied the record for most conference championship game appearances, with their 15th appearance. They share the record with the Pittsburgh Steelers.
- Jim Harbaugh became the first head coach to take his team to a conference championship game in each of his first three seasons.
- Peyton Manning tied the record for most playoff games with at least 400 passing yards, with three, sharing the record with Drew Brees.

Super Bowl XLVIII

- John Fox became the sixth head coach to lead two different franchises to the Super Bowl. He previously coached the Carolina Panthers in Super Bowl XXXVIII.
- The Seattle Seahawks recorded the fastest score in a Super Bowl with a safety 12 seconds into the game. The previous record of 14 seconds was held by the Chicago Bears in Super Bowl XLI.
- The Seahawks set the record for the longest time holding a lead in a Super Bowl, at 59 minutes, 48 seconds of game time.
- The Denver Broncos set the record for most Super Bowl losses with five. They shared the record of four with the Buffalo Bills, Minnesota Vikings, and New England Patriots
- Peyton Manning set a Super Bowl record for passes completed with 34.
- Manning move into first place on the career playoff passing yardage list with 6,589 yards, passing Tom Brady.
- Demaryius Thomas caught 13 passes to set a single-game Super Bowl record.

== Regular season statistical leaders ==
Individual
Scoring leader	Stephen Gostkowski, New England (158)
Most field goals made	Justin Tucker, Baltimore and Stephen Gostkowski (38 FGs)
Touchdowns	Jamaal Charles, Kansas (19 TDs)
Rushing	LeSean McCoy, Philadelphia (1,607 yards)
Passing yards	Peyton Manning, Denver (5,477 yards)
Passing touchdowns	Peyton Manning, Denver (55 TDs)
Passer rating	Nick Foles, Philadelphia (119.2 rating)
Pass receptions	Pierre Garcon, Washington (113 catches)
Pass receiving yards	Josh Gordon, Cleveland (1,646 yards)
Combined tackles	Vontaze Burfict, Cincinnati (165 tackles)
Interceptions	Richard Sherman, Seattle (8)
Punting	Bryan Anger, Jacksonville (4,338 yards, 45.7 average yards)
Sacks	Robert Mathis, Indianapolis (19.5)

== Awards and statistics ==
=== Individual season awards ===
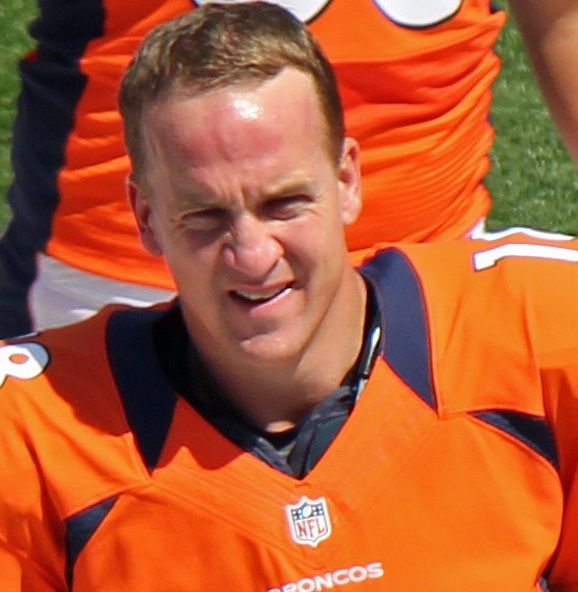
AP MVP & Offensive Player of the Year Peyton Manning

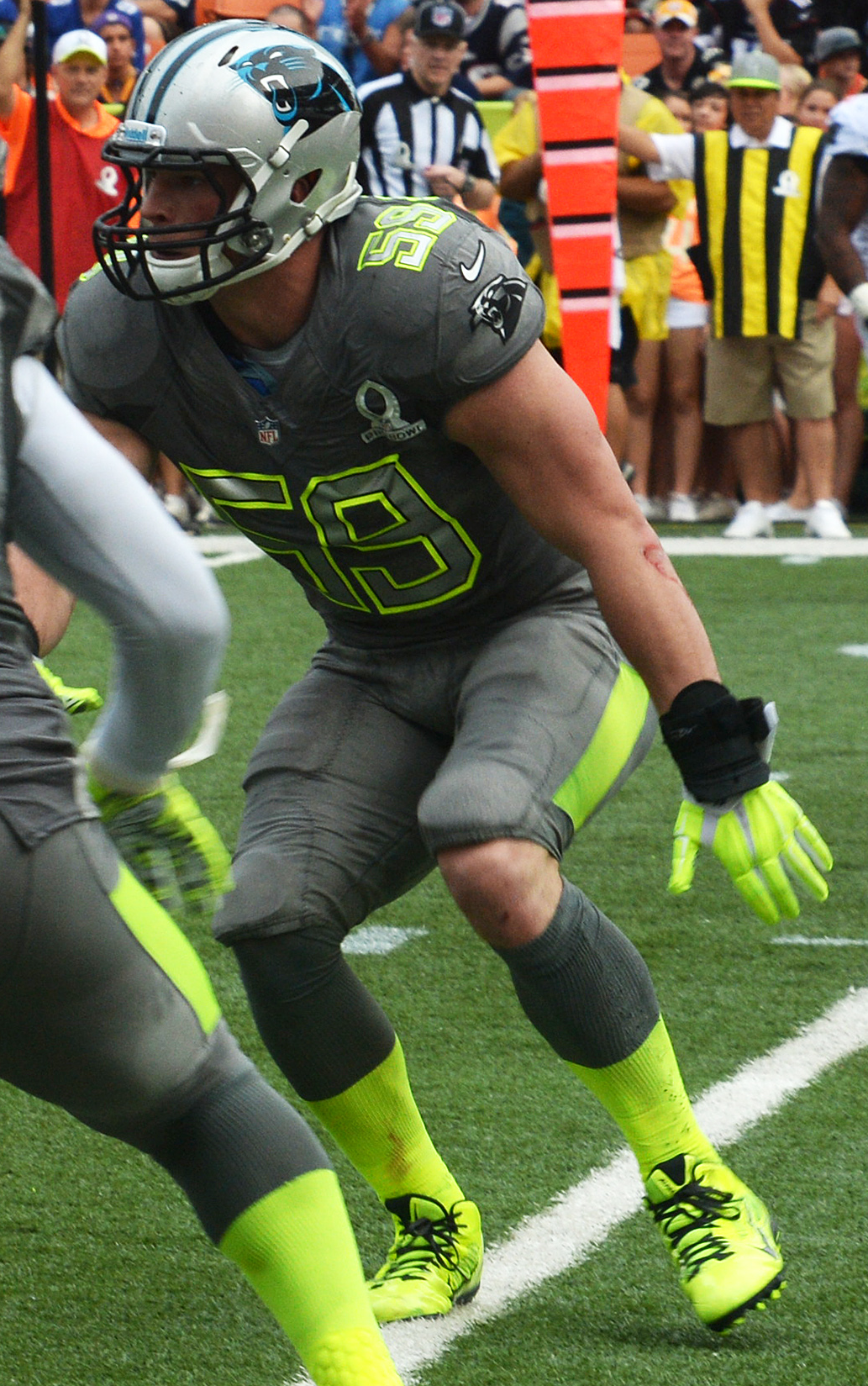
AP Defensive Player of the Year Luke Kuechly

The 3rd NFL Honors, saluting the best players and plays from 2013 season, was held on February 1, 2014, at Radio City Music Hall in New York City.

Award	Winner	Position	Team
AP Most Valuable Player	Peyton Manning	Quarterback	Denver Broncos
AP Offensive Player of the Year	Peyton Manning	Quarterback	Denver Broncos
AP Defensive Player of the Year	Luke Kuechly	Linebacker	Carolina Panthers
AP Coach of the Year	Ron Rivera	Head coach	Carolina Panthers
AP Offensive Rookie of the Year	Eddie Lacy	Running back	Green Bay Packers
AP Defensive Rookie of the Year	Sheldon Richardson	Defensive end	New York Jets
AP Comeback Player of the Year	Philip Rivers	Quarterback	San Diego Chargers
Pepsi Rookie of the Year	Keenan Allen	Wide receiver	San Diego Chargers
Walter Payton NFL Man of the Year	Charles Tillman	Cornerback	Chicago Bears
PFWA NFL Executive of the Year	John Dorsey	General manager	Kansas City Chiefs
Super Bowl Most Valuable Player	Malcolm Smith	Linebacker	Seattle Seahawks

=== All-Pro team ===
The following players were named first team All-Pro by the Associated Press:

Offense
Quarterback	Peyton Manning, Denver
Running back	LeSean McCoy, Philadelphia; Jamaal Charles, Kansas City
Fullback	Mike Tolbert, Carolina
Wide receiver	Calvin Johnson, Detroit; Josh Gordon, Cleveland
Tight end	Jimmy Graham, New Orleans
Offensive tackle	Joe Thomas, Cleveland; Jason Peters, Philadelphia
Offensive guard	Louis Vasquez, Denver; Evan Mathis, Philadelphia
Center	Ryan Kalil, Carolina

Defense
Defensive end	J. J. Watt, Houston; Robert Quinn, St. Louis
Defensive tackle	Gerald McCoy, Tampa Bay; Ndamukong Suh, Detroit
Outside linebacker	Robert Mathis, Indianapolis; Lavonte David, Tampa Bay
Inside linebacker	Luke Kuechly, Carolina; NaVorro Bowman, San Francisco
Cornerback	Richard Sherman, Seattle; Patrick Peterson, Arizona
Safety	Earl Thomas, Seattle; Eric Berry, Kansas City

Special teams
Kicker	Justin Tucker, Baltimore
Punter	John Hekker, St. Louis
Kick returner	Cordarrelle Patterson, Minnesota

=== Players of the week/month ===
The following were named the top performers during the 2013 season:

Week/ Month	Offensive Player of the Week/Month		Defensive Player of the Week/Month		Special Teams Player of the Week/Month	
Week/ Month	AFC	NFC	AFC	NFC	AFC	NFC
1	Peyton Manning (Broncos)	Anquan Boldin (49ers)	Justin Houston (Chiefs)	Robert Quinn (Rams)	Nick Folk (Jets)	Dwayne Harris (Cowboys)
2	Philip Rivers (Chargers)	Aaron Rodgers (Packers)	Mario Williams (Bills)	Richard Sherman (Seahawks)	Trindon Holliday (Broncos)	Devin Hester (Bears)
3	Peyton Manning (Broncos)	Jimmy Graham (Saints)	Justin Houston (Chiefs)	Greg Hardy (Panthers)	Spencer Lanning (Browns)	Sam Martin (Lions)
4	Philip Rivers (Chargers)	Drew Brees (Saints)	Alterraun Verner (Titans)	Patrick Peterson (Cardinals)	Dexter McCluster (Chiefs)	Steven Hauschka (Seahawks)
Sept.	Peyton Manning (Broncos)	Jimmy Graham (Saints)	Justin Houston (Chiefs)	Richard Sherman (Seahawks)	Trindon Holliday (Broncos)	Cordarrelle Patterson (Vikings)
5	Geno Smith (Jets)	DeSean Jackson (Eagles)	Charles Woodson (Raiders)	Tramaine Brock (49ers)	Travis Benjamin (Browns)	Mason Crosby (Packers)
6	Andy Dalton (Bengals)	Nick Foles (Eagles)	Tamba Hali (Chiefs)	Thomas Davis (Panthers)	Nick Novak (Chargers)	Dwayne Harris (Cowboys)
7	Andrew Luck (Colts)	Matt Ryan (Falcons)	Mario Williams (Bills)	Sean Lee (Cowboys)	Shaun Suisham (Steelers)	Andy Lee (49ers)
8	Marvin Jones (Bengals)	Calvin Johnson (Lions)	Dominique Rodgers-Cromartie (Broncos)	Terrell Thomas (Giants)	Ryan Succop (Chiefs)	Cordarrelle Patterson (Vikings)
Oct.	Andy Dalton (Bengals)	Calvin Johnson (Lions)	Robert Mathis (Colts)	Sean Lee (Cowboys)	Stephen Gostkowski (Patriots)	Mason Crosby (Packers)
9	Jason Campbell (Browns)	Nick Foles (Eagles)	Cameron Wake (Dolphins)	Shea McClellin (Bears)	Nick Folk (Jets)	Golden Tate (Seahawks)
10	Demaryius Thomas (Broncos)	Drew Brees (Saints)	Paul Posluszny (Jaguars)	Luke Kuechly (Panthers)	Justin Tucker (Ravens)	Tavon Austin (Rams)
11	Ben Roethlisberger (Steelers)	Bobby Rainey (Buccaneers)	Vontaze Burfict (Bengals)	Jason Pierre-Paul (Giants)	Adam Vinatieri (Colts)	Donnie Jones (Eagles)
12	Tom Brady (Patriots)	Carson Palmer (Cardinals)	Troy Polamalu (Steelers)	Lavonte David (Buccaneers)	Justin Tucker (Ravens)	Blair Walsh (Vikings)
Nov.	Ben Roethlisberger (Steelers)	Nick Foles (Eagles)	Chandler Jones (Patriots)	Thomas Davis (Panthers)	Justin Tucker (Ravens)	Tavon Austin (Rams)
13	Eric Decker (Broncos)	Russell Wilson (Seahawks)	Olivier Vernon (Dolphins)	Justin Tuck (Giants)	Kevin Huber (Bengals)	Donnie Jones (Eagles)
14	Andy Dalton (Bengals)	Josh McCown (Bears)	Tamba Hali (Chiefs)	John Abraham (Cardinals)	Matt Prater (Broncos)	Phil Dawson (49ers)
15	Jamaal Charles (Chiefs)	Eddie Lacy (Packers)	Michael Thomas (Dolphins)	Richard Sherman (Seahawks)	Justin Tucker (Ravens)	Jay Feely (Cardinals)
16	Peyton Manning (Broncos)	LeSean McCoy (Eagles)	Jerrell Freeman (Colts)	Luke Kuechly (Panthers)	Nick Novak (Chargers)	Josh Brown (Giants)
17	LeGarrette Blount (Patriots)	Drew Brees (Saints)	Dee Milliner (Jets)	Greg Hardy (Panthers)	Adam Vinatieri (Colts)	Phil Dawson (49ers)
Dec.	Peyton Manning (Broncos)	LeSean McCoy (Eagles)	Robert Mathis (Colts)	NaVorro Bowman (49ers)	Dexter McCluster (Chiefs)	Brad Nortman (Panthers)

Week	FedEx Air Player of the Week (Quarterbacks)	FedEx Ground Player of the Week (Running Backs)	Pepsi Next Rookie of the Week
1	Peyton Manning (Broncos)	LeSean McCoy (Eagles)	PK Caleb Sturgis (Dolphins)
2	Aaron Rodgers (Packers)	James Starks (Packers)	QB EJ Manuel (Bills)
3	Peyton Manning (Broncos)	DeMarco Murray (Cowboys)	RB Giovani Bernard (Bengals)
4	Drew Brees (Saints)	Adrian Peterson (Vikings)	LB Kiko Alonso (Bills)
5	Tony Romo (Cowboys)	Jamaal Charles (Chiefs)	QB Geno Smith (Jets)
6	Nick Foles (Eagles)	Eddie Lacy (Packers)	WR Keenan Allen (Chargers)
7	Matt Ryan (Falcons)	Chris Ivory (Jets)	OT D. J. Fluker (Chargers)
8	Drew Brees (Saints)	Andre Ellington (Cardinals)	LB Sio Moore (Raiders)
9	Nick Foles (Eagles)	Chris Johnson (Titans)	RB Eddie Lacy (Packers)
10	Drew Brees (Saints)	Mark Ingram II (Saints)	WR Tavon Austin (Rams)
11	Ben Roethlisberger (Steelers)	Bobby Rainey (Buccaneers)	QB Matt McGloin (Raiders)
12	Philip Rivers (Chargers)	Adrian Peterson (Vikings)	WR Keenan Allen (Chargers)
13	Peyton Manning (Broncos)	Adrian Peterson (Vikings)	TE Zach Ertz (Eagles)
14	Drew Brees (Saints)	LeSean McCoy (Eagles)	WR Marlon Brown (Ravens)
15	Matt Cassel (Vikings)	Eddie Lacy (Packers)	WR Keenan Allen (Chargers)
16	Peyton Manning (Broncos)	LeSean McCoy (Eagles)	RB Le'Veon Bell (Steelers)
17	Drew Brees (Saints)	LeGarrette Blount (Patriots)	WR Keenan Allen (Chargers)

Month	Rookie of the Month	
Month	Offensive	Defensive
Sept.	DeAndre Hopkins (Texans)	Kiko Alonso (Bills)
Oct.	Eddie Lacy (Packers)	Tyrann Mathieu (Cardinals)
Nov.	Mike Glennon (Buccaneers)	Sheldon Richardson (Jets)
Dec.	Cordarrelle Patterson (Vikings)	Dee Milliner (Jets)

=== Team statistical leaders ===
Offense

- Most points scored: Denver, 606 points (37.9 points/game)
- Fewest points scored: Jacksonville, 247 points (15.4 points/game)
- Most total offense: Denver, 7,317 yards (457.3 yards/game)
- Least total offense: Tampa Bay, 4,432 yards (277 yards/game)
- Most total passing: Denver, 5,444 yards (340.3 yards/game)
- Least total passing: Tampa Bay, 2,820 yards (176.3 yards/game)
- Most rushing: Philadelphia, 2,566 yards (160.4 yards/game)
- Least rushing: Atlanta, 1,247 yards (77.9 yards/game)

Defense

- Fewest points allowed: Seattle, 231 points (14.4 points/game)
- Most points allowed: Minnesota, 480 (30 points/game)
- Fewest total yards allowed (defense): Seattle, 4,378 yards (273.6 yards/game)
- Most total yards allowed (defense): Dallas, 6,645 yards (415.3 yards/game)
- Fewest passing yards allowed: Seattle, 2,752 (172 yards/game)
- Most passing yards allowed (defense): Philadelphia, 4,636 yards (289.8 yards/game)
- Fewest rushing yards allowed (defense): Arizona, 1,351 yards (84.4 yards/game)
- Most rushing yards allowed (defense): Chicago, 2,583 yards (161.4 yards/game)

== Head coach/front office changes ==
=== Head coach ===
Offseason

Team	2012 head coach	Reason for leaving	2013 replacement	Notes
Arizona Cardinals	Ken Whisenhunt	Fired	Bruce Arians	Whisenhunt compiled a 49–53 record (including postseason games) making him the Cardinals' all-time coach with most wins. He led the team to its first Super Bowl and had just two losing seasons in his six as head coach, but the team had missed the playoffs the previous three years. The Cardinals started 4–0 in 2012, but lost 11 of their final 12 games, including a franchise-worst 58–0 defeat to the Seattle Seahawks in Week 14. Arians went 9–3 as interim head coach of the Indianapolis Colts filling in for Chuck Pagano who left the team to undergo treatment for cancer. Arians's previous head coaching experience was with Temple University from 1984 through 1988.
Buffalo Bills	Chan Gailey	Fired	Doug Marrone	The Bills compiled a record of 16–32 (.333) and finished last in their division in each of Gailey's three seasons as head coach. Gailey chose not to pursue further coaching after the dismissal and retired. Marrone had spent the past four seasons as head coach at Syracuse University. Prior to that he had been the offensive coordinator of the New Orleans Saints for three years.
Chicago Bears	Lovie Smith	Fired	Marc Trestman	Smith compiled a record of 84–66 (including postseason games) in nine seasons as head coach of the Bears. In the 2012 season, the Bears became the first team since the 1996 Washington Redskins to miss the playoffs following a 7–1 start to the season. Trestman had spent the previous five seasons as head coach of the Montreal Alouettes. During that tenure, he won back-to-back CFL Grey Cup championships in 2009 and 2010. He had previously coached for several NFL teams.
Cleveland Browns	Pat Shurmur	Fired	Rob Chudzinski	Shurmur compiled a record of 9–23 (.281) and failed to make the playoffs in two seasons as coach of the Browns. Chudzinski had spent the previous two seasons as offensive coordinator of the Carolina Panthers and had served in the same capacity with the Browns in 2007 and 2008.
Jacksonville Jaguars	Mike Mularkey	Fired	Gus Bradley	Mularkey compiled a record of 2–14 (.125) in his only season as head coach of the Jaguars. Bradley was the defensive coordinator for the Seattle Seahawks the previous three seasons. Prior to that he served as linebackers coach for the Tampa Bay Buccaneers in 2007 and 2008. He spent the first sixteen years of his coaching career toiling in the collegiate Division II and Football Championship Subdivision (previously known as Division I-AA) ranks.
Kansas City Chiefs	Romeo Crennel	Fired	Andy Reid	Crennel compiled a record of 4–15 (.211) in just over one season as coach of the Chiefs – he had taken over as interim head coach when Todd Haley was fired with three games remaining in the 2011 season. The Chiefs two wins in 2012 were the fewest in team history since 2008. Reid had been fired earlier in the offseason after spending the past 14 seasons as head coach of the Philadelphia Eagles.
Philadelphia Eagles	Andy Reid	Fired	Chip Kelly	Including postseason play, Reid compiled a record of 140–101–1 (.581) in fourteen seasons as head coach of the Eagles. The team earn nine playoff berths, appeared in the NFC Championship Game five times, and lost in Super Bowl XXXIX. He is the franchise's all-time coach with most wins. The Eagles' 4–12 record in 2012 was the team's worst in Reid's tenure. Kelly had spent the previous four seasons as head coach at the University of Oregon where he had developed a reputation as an offensive innovator in leading the team to four straight BCS bowl games. He had previously been linked to the Browns' head coaching job before backing out and announcing his intention to remain at Oregon. A few days later he had a change of heart and accepted the Eagles job.
San Diego Chargers	Norv Turner	Fired	Mike McCoy	Turner compiled a record of 59–43 (including 3–3 in the postseason) in six seasons as head coach of the Chargers. After making the playoffs in Turner's first three seasons (2007–2009), the team had missed the playoffs in each of the past three seasons. This is McCoy's first ever head coaching position. He had spent the past four years as offensive coordinator of the Denver Broncos.
New Orleans Saints	Joe Vitt, Aaron Kromer	Reinstated	Sean Payton	Payton had been suspended for the 2012 season due to his role in the New Orleans Saints bounty scandal; he was reinstated on January 22, shortly before New Orleans would host Super Bowl XLVII. In the six games (seven weeks) that Kromer served as interim head coach, the Saints compiled a record of 2–4 (.333); in the ten games under Vitt, the team went 5–5 (.500).

In-season

The following head coaches were replaced in-season:

Team	2013 head coach	Reason for leaving	Interim head coach	Notes
Denver Broncos	John Fox	Medical leave (weeks 10–13)	Jack Del Rio	Del Rio was named as the Broncos' interim head coach when Fox went on medical leave in mid-season. Fox underwent an aortic valve replacement after becoming light headed on the golf course during the team's bye week on November 2. Fox had been aware of the heart condition, but had hoped to delay surgery until after the season. Fox returned as head coach for the team's week 14 game on December 8. Del Rio, the Broncos' defensive coordinator, had previously been the Jacksonville Jaguars' head coach from 2003 through 2011. The Broncos went 3–1 under Del Rio.
Houston Texans	Gary Kubiak	Medical leave (weeks 9–10) Fired (weeks 15–17)	Wade Phillips	Kubiak went on medical leave to recover from a transient ischemic attack or "mini stroke", after he collapsed at halftime of the Texans' Week 9 loss to the Indianapolis Colts on November 3. Phillips took over head coaching duties for the second half of the week 9 game and served as interim head coach the following week. Kubiak returned for Week 11 although he coached the next two games from the press box rather than the sidelines on the advice of his doctors. Kubiak was fired on December 6, after a loss to the Jaguars on Thursday Night Football which was a franchise record eleventh straight defeat. Kubiak leaves Houston with a record of 63–66 (.488), including the franchise's only two playoff appearances. Phillips, the Texans' defensive coordinator, has nine seasons of previous head coaching experience with the Denver Broncos, Buffalo Bills and Dallas Cowboys, and has previously served as an interim head coach with the Atlanta Falcons and New Orleans Saints.

=== Front office ===
Offseason

Team	Position	2012 office holder at start of season	Interim office holder	Reason for leaving	2013 replacement	Notes
Arizona Cardinals	GM	Rod Graves		Fired	Steve Keim	Longtime General manager Rod Graves was dismissed along with head coach Ken Whisenhunt immediately following the 2012 season. Graves had worked in the Cardinals organization for 16 years. He had been the "personal assistant to the team's president" from 1997 through 2002 when he was promoted to become the vice president of football operations, which made him the team's head football decision maker, in 2003. During Graves' ten years in charge of the Cardinals personnel department the team compiled a record of 65–95 (.406). Graves was replaced by Steve Keim who has been with the franchise for 14 years. Keim started as a scout in 1999 and worked his way up to become director of college scouting in 2006, then director of player personnel in 2008 and finally vice president for player personnel in 2012. Prior to joining the Cardinals Keim had a brief playing career in the NFL and CFL.
Buffalo Bills	GM	Buddy Nix		Retired	Doug Whaley	Nix stepped down as GM following the draft. He had been the team's GM since 2010 during which time the team went 16–32. He will stay with the team in a consulting role as a special assistant. Assistant GM Doug Whaley was promoted to replace Nix. The 40-year-old Whaley had been groomed as Nix' replacement since he was hired from the Pittsburgh Steelers in 2010. He becomes the Bills first black GM and the league's sixth.
Buffalo Bills	President	Ralph Wilson		Retired	Russ Brandon	Bills owner Ralph Wilson relinquished control of the team's operations, ceding his title of president to team CEO Russ Brandon. This move meant the team's general manager, who had previously reported directly to Wilson, would now report to Brandon.
Carolina Panthers	GM	Marty Hurney	Brandon Beane	Fired	Dave Gettleman	Until he was fired midway through the 2012 season, Hurney had held the position of general manager since 2002. Gettleman had spent the previous 15 years working in the New York Giants front office.
Cleveland Browns	GM	Tom Heckert, Jr.		Fired	Michael Lombardi	Heckert was fired after a three-year tenure as the Browns GM during which the team went 14–34 (.292). Lombardi replaced Heckert in the GM role, although he was given the title of Vice President of Player Personnel. Lombardi had previously worked in the Browns front office from 1987 through 1995. He later spent eight seasons with the Oakland Raiders and has also worked for the Philadelphia Eagles and San Francisco 49ers. Most recently he was an NFL analyst for the NFL Network and NFL.com.
Cleveland Browns	President	Mike Holmgren	Joe Banner	Fired	Alec Scheiner	On December 18, 2012, Scheiner left his position as vice president of the Dallas Cowboys to become president of the Browns, where he is in charge of all business operations for the team.
Jacksonville Jaguars	GM	Gene Smith		Fired	David Caldwell	Smith had been with the franchise since its inception in 1994 and had served as GM for the previous four seasons. The team went 22–42 (.344) under Smith including a league-worst 2–14 in the previous season. Among the most often cited draft misses in Smith's career was selecting a punter (Bryan Anger) in the third round of the 2012 draft just a few selections before the Seattle Seahawks picked quarterback Russell Wilson. Smith was replaced by David Caldwell. The 38-year-old Caldwell has seventeen years of NFL front office experience, most recently as director of player personnel for the Atlanta Falcons. Prior to his five-year stint in Atlanta where he served as director of college scouting from 2008 through 2011, Caldwell has also worked for the Carolina Panthers and Indianapolis Colts.
Kansas City Chiefs	GM	Scott Pioli		Fired	John Dorsey	Pioli was fired shortly after Andy Reid was hired as the Chief's head coach. The team had a winning season just once in Pioli's four years at the helm, posting an overall record of 23–41 (.359). John Dorsey had worked in the Green Bay Packers scouting department since 1991, first as a scout and then as the team's director of college scouting since 1997. He left the Packers briefly following Mike Holmgren to the Seattle Seahawks in 1999, but returned after 14 months. He had a five-year playing career with the Packers in the 1980s.
New York Jets	GM	Mike Tannenbaum		Fired	John Idzik, Jr.	Tannenbaum was fired after the Jets completed a 6–10 season. He had been with the team for fifteen years and had served as GM for the past seven seasons. With Tannenbaum as GM, the team posted a record of 57–55 (.509) and reached the playoffs three times, though the last time they did so was in 2010. John Idzik, Jr. was hired from the Seattle Seahawks where he was the vice president for football administration. He is primarily known as a salary cap expert. Prior to the Seahawks, Idzik worked for the Tampa Bay Buccaneers and Arizona Cardinals in a twenty-year NFL career.
Oakland Raiders	President	Amy Trask		Resigned	Marc Badain (interim)	Trask resigned from the Raiders on May 11, 2013. Following her resignation, chief financial officer Marc Badain became the interim president of the team.
San Diego Chargers	GM	A. J. Smith		Fired	Tom Telesco	The Chargers fired Smith on the same day they dismissed head coach Norv Turner. Smith had been the Chargers GM since 2003, compiling a 95–65 (.594) regular-season record with five playoff appearances making his tenure the "most successful 10-year stretch" in team history. Smith was replaced as GM by 40-year-old Tom Telesco who had been the vice president of football operations for the Indianapolis Colts' with whom he had worked for the past 15 years.

In-season

Team	Position	Departing office holder	Reason for leaving	Interim replacement	Notes
Tennessee Titans	President	Bud Adams	Death	Tommy Smith	Smith, Bud Adams' son-in-law, was named the new CEO and president of the team shortly after Adams passed away in October 2013.

== Attendance ==
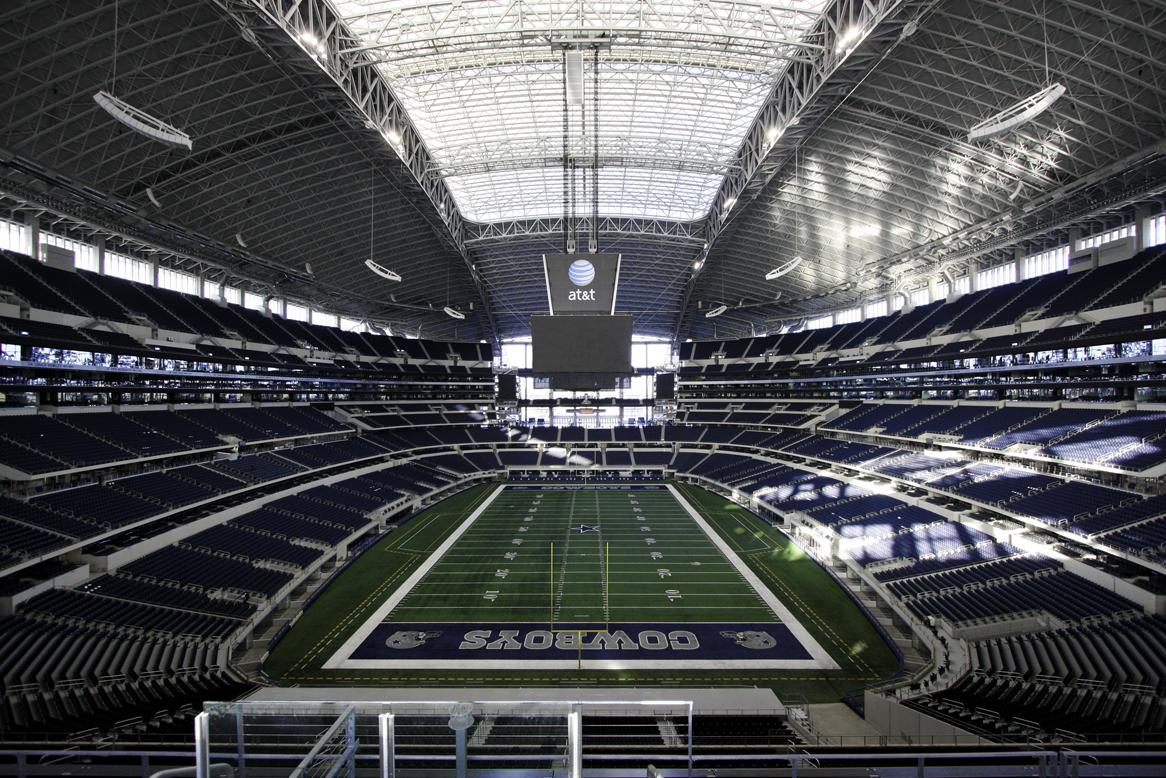
AT&T Stadium – Interior

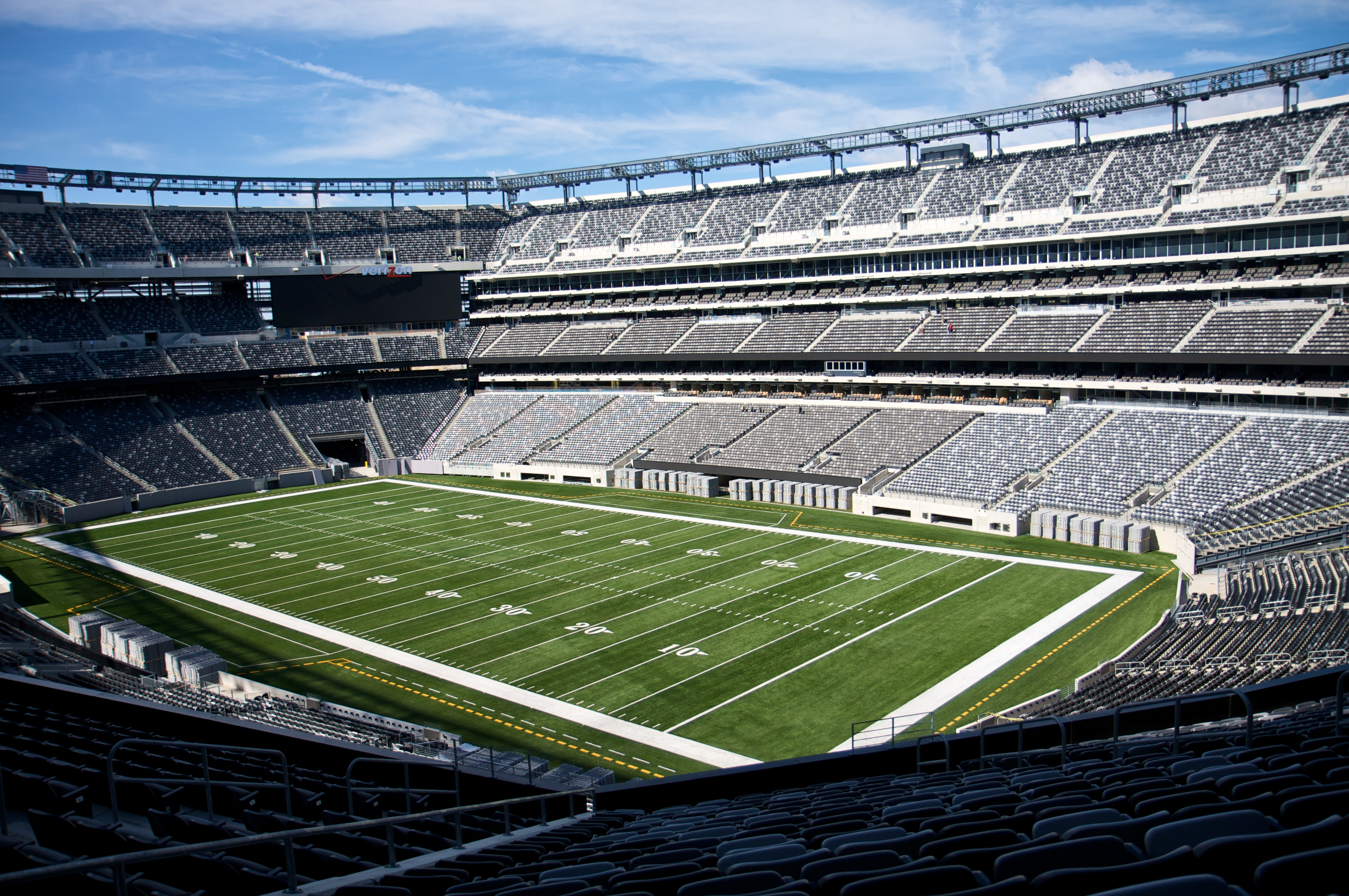
MetLife Stadium

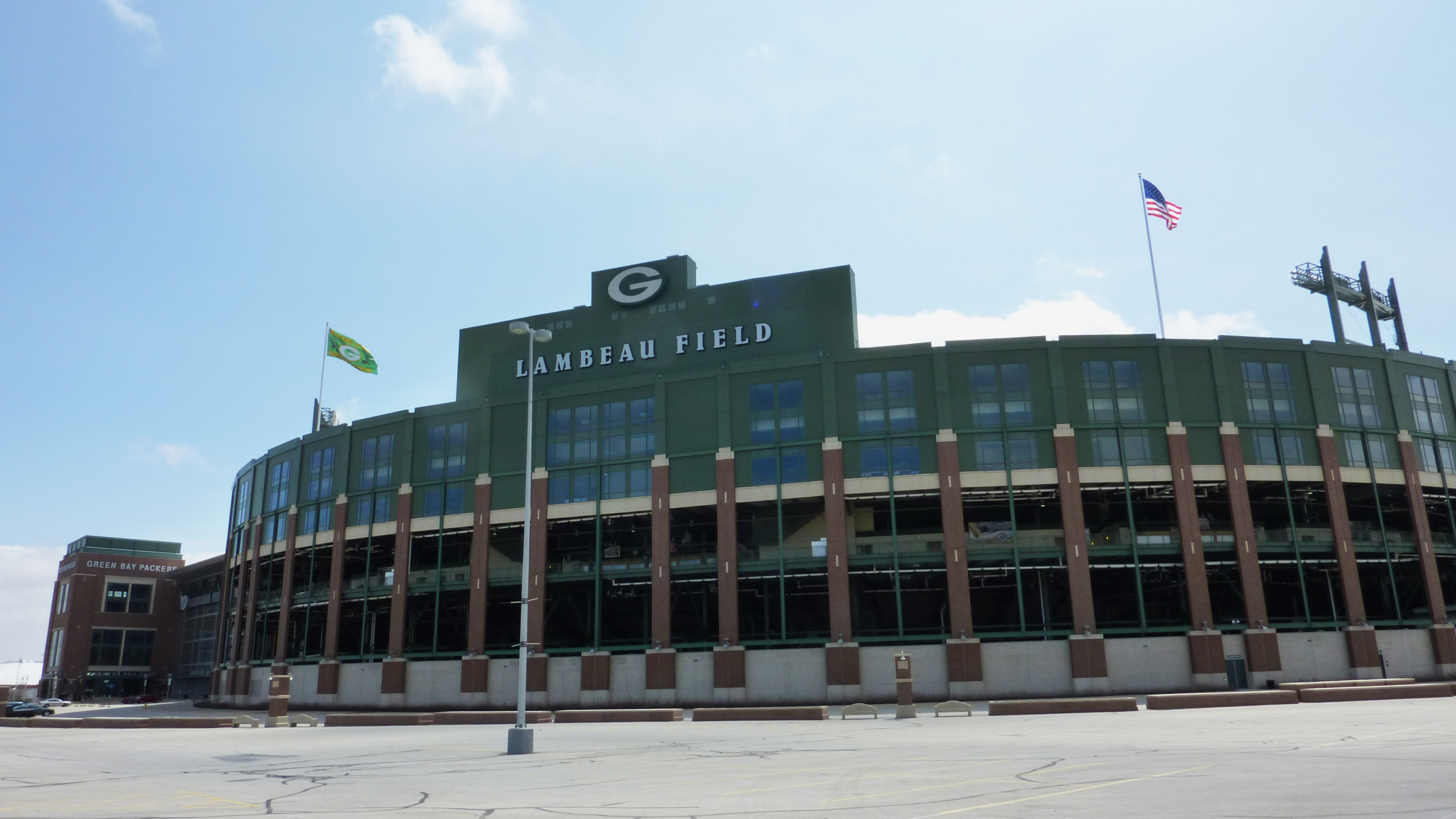
Lambeau Field

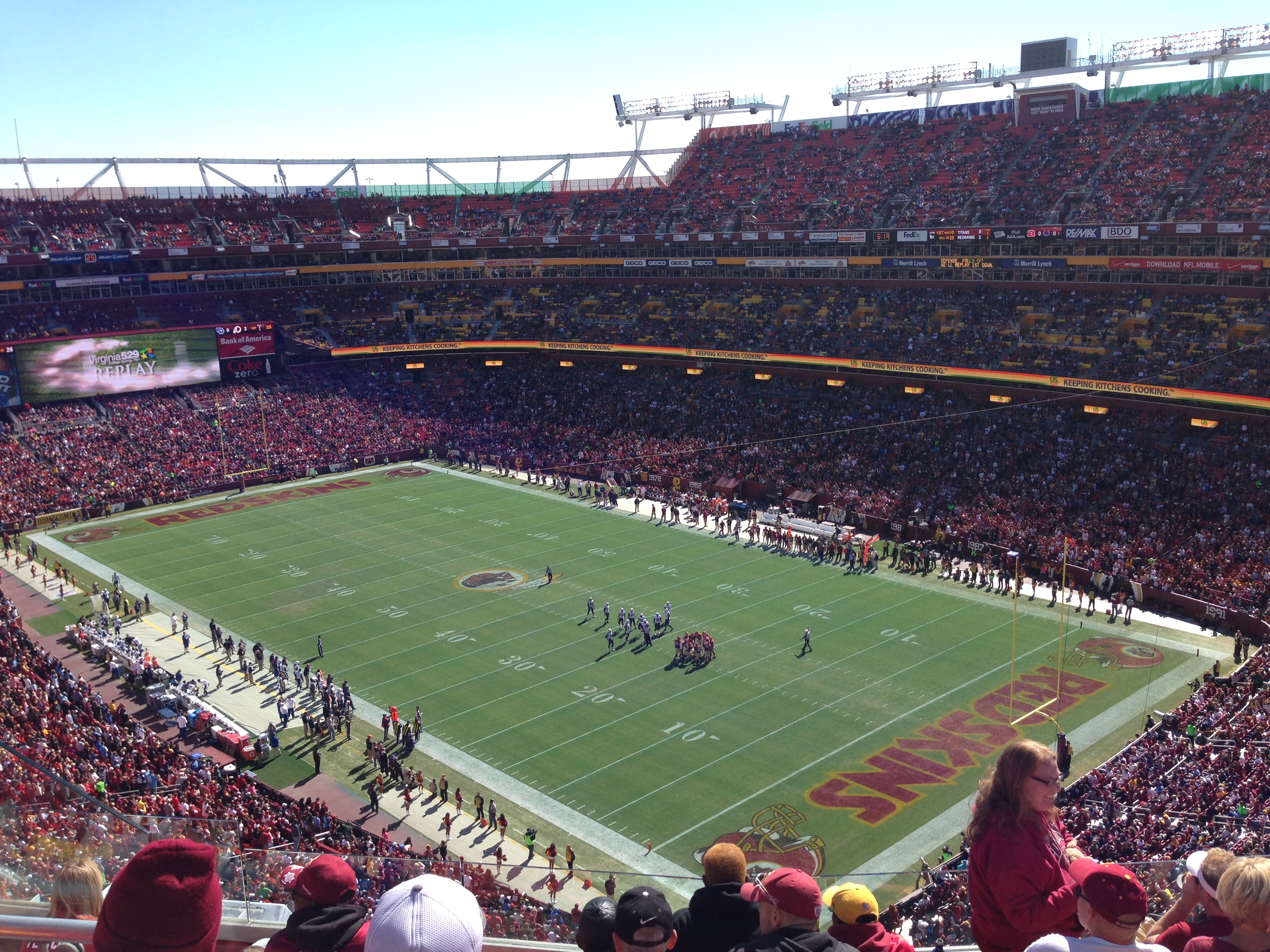
FedExField

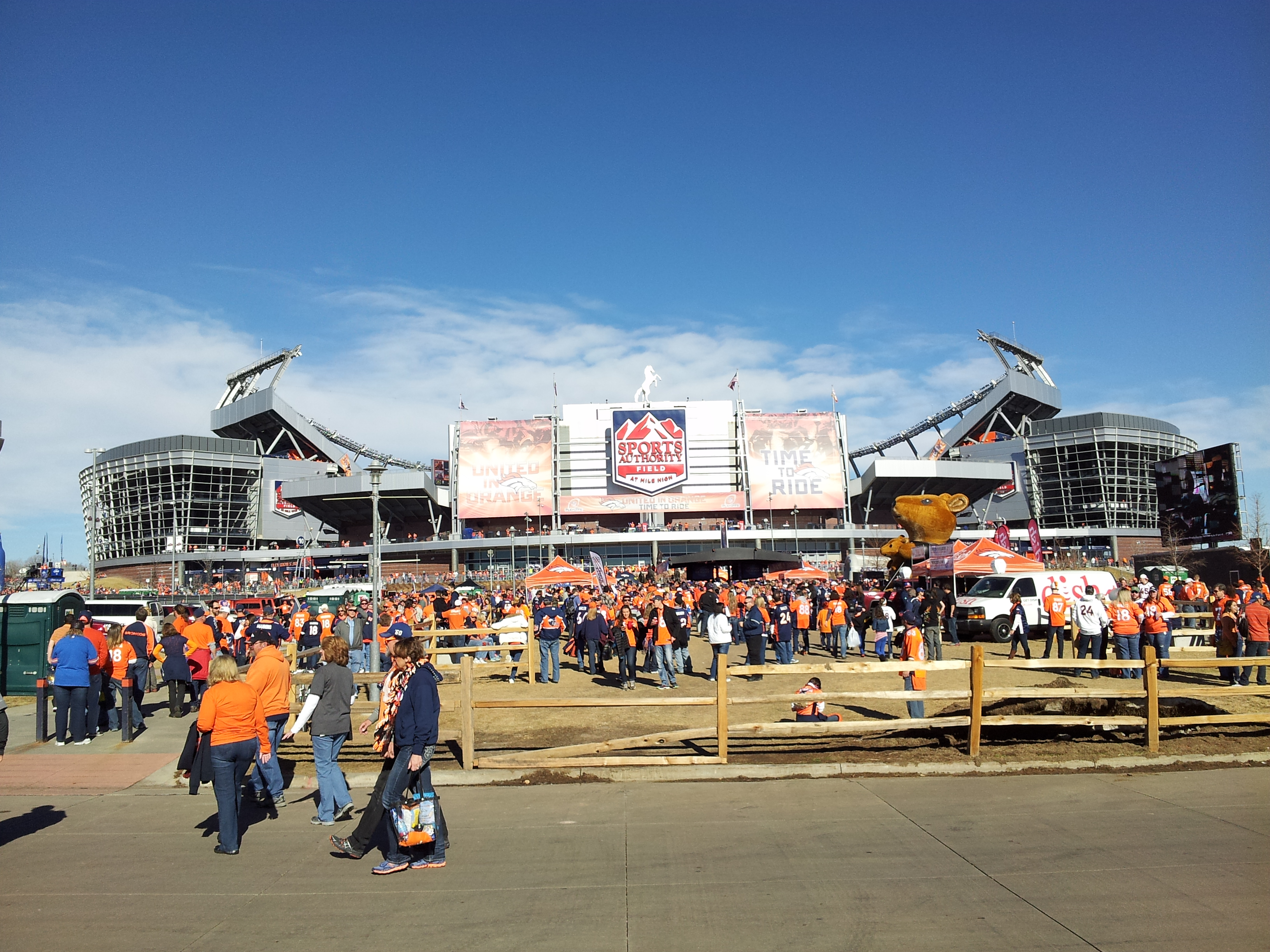
Sports Authority Field at Mile High

2013 NFL home attendance by team
Team	Stadium	Home Games	Total Attendance	Average Attendance	Capacity percentage
Dallas	AT&T Stadium	8	704,345^{[a]}	88,043^{[b]}	110.4%
New York Giants	MetLife Stadium	8	641,148	80,148	97.1%
Green Bay	Lambeau Field	8	623,577	77,947	106.9%
Washington	FedExField	8	617,767	77,220	84.2%
New York Jets	MetLife Stadium	8	615,656	76,957	93.3%
Denver	Sports Authority Field at Mile High	8	614,977	76,872	101.0%
Kansas City	Arrowhead Stadium	8	602,877	75,359	98.2%
Carolina	Bank of America Stadium	8	587,544	73,443	99.5%
New Orleans	Mercedes-Benz Superdome	8	583,210	72,901	99.9%
Houston	Reliant Stadium	8	573,271	71,658	100.9%
Cleveland	FirstEnergy Stadium	8	569,969	71,242	97.3%
Baltimore	M&T Bank Stadium	8	569,084	71,135	100.2%
Atlanta	Georgia Dome	8	561,795	70,224	98.6%
San Francisco	Candlestick Park	8	557,856	69,732	99.3%
Philadelphia	Lincoln Financial Field	8	553,152	69,144	102.3%
Tennessee	LP Field	8	553,144	69,143	100.0%
New England	Gillette Stadium	8	550,048	68,756	100.0%
Seattle	CenturyLink Field	8	545,577	68,197	101.8%
Buffalo	Ralph Wilson Stadium	7^{[c]}	463,873	66,267	90.7%
Indianapolis	Lucas Oil Stadium	8	527,606	65,950	104.7%
Miami	Sun Life Stadium	8	514,553	64,319	85.5%
San Diego	Qualcomm Stadium	8	513,641	64,205	90.1%
Minnesota	Hubert H. Humphrey Metrodome	7^{[d]}	448,135	64,019	99.8%
Detroit	Ford Field	8	510,369	63,796	98.9%
Cincinnati	Paul Brown Stadium	8	506,377	63,297	96.6%
Chicago	Soldier Field	8	498,864	62,358	101.4%
Arizona	University of Phoenix Stadium	8	488,271	61,033	96.6%
Jacksonville	EverBank Field	7^{[d]}	419,581	59,940	89.2%
Tampa Bay	Raymond James Stadium	8	470,548	58,818	89.6%
Pittsburgh	Heinz Field	8	458,489	57,311	88.2%
St. Louis	Edward Jones Dome	8	455,657	56,957	87.2%
Oakland	O.co Coliseum	8	403,556	50,444	80.0%

Notes

- ^{a} – 80,000 without people watching on screens at the party decks.
- ^{b} – 640,000 without people watching on screens at the party decks.
- ^{c} – Played one home game in Toronto, Ontario, Canada.
- ^{d} – Played one home game in London, England.

== Stadium changes ==
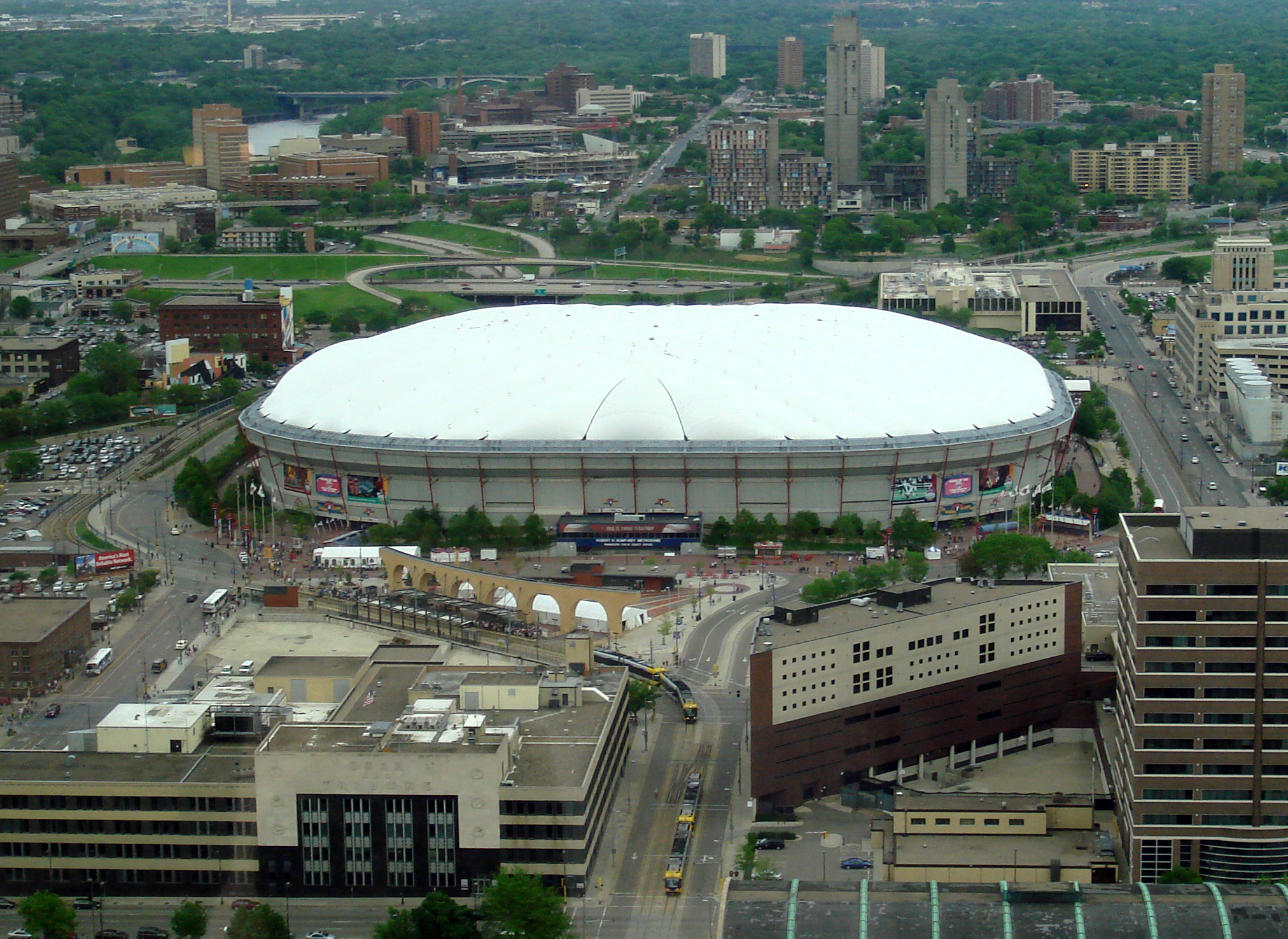
Hubert H. Humphrey Metrodome

2013 marked the final season in which the Minnesota Vikings played their home games at the Hubert H. Humphrey Metrodome, as the team moved temporarily to TCF Bank Stadium (home of the University of Minnesota Golden Gophers) while their U.S. Bank Stadium was built at the same site as the Metrodome. The Vikings played the 2014 and 2015 seasons at TCF Bank Stadium and opened their new stadium for the 2016 season. The Vikings had called the Metrodome home since it opened in 1982.

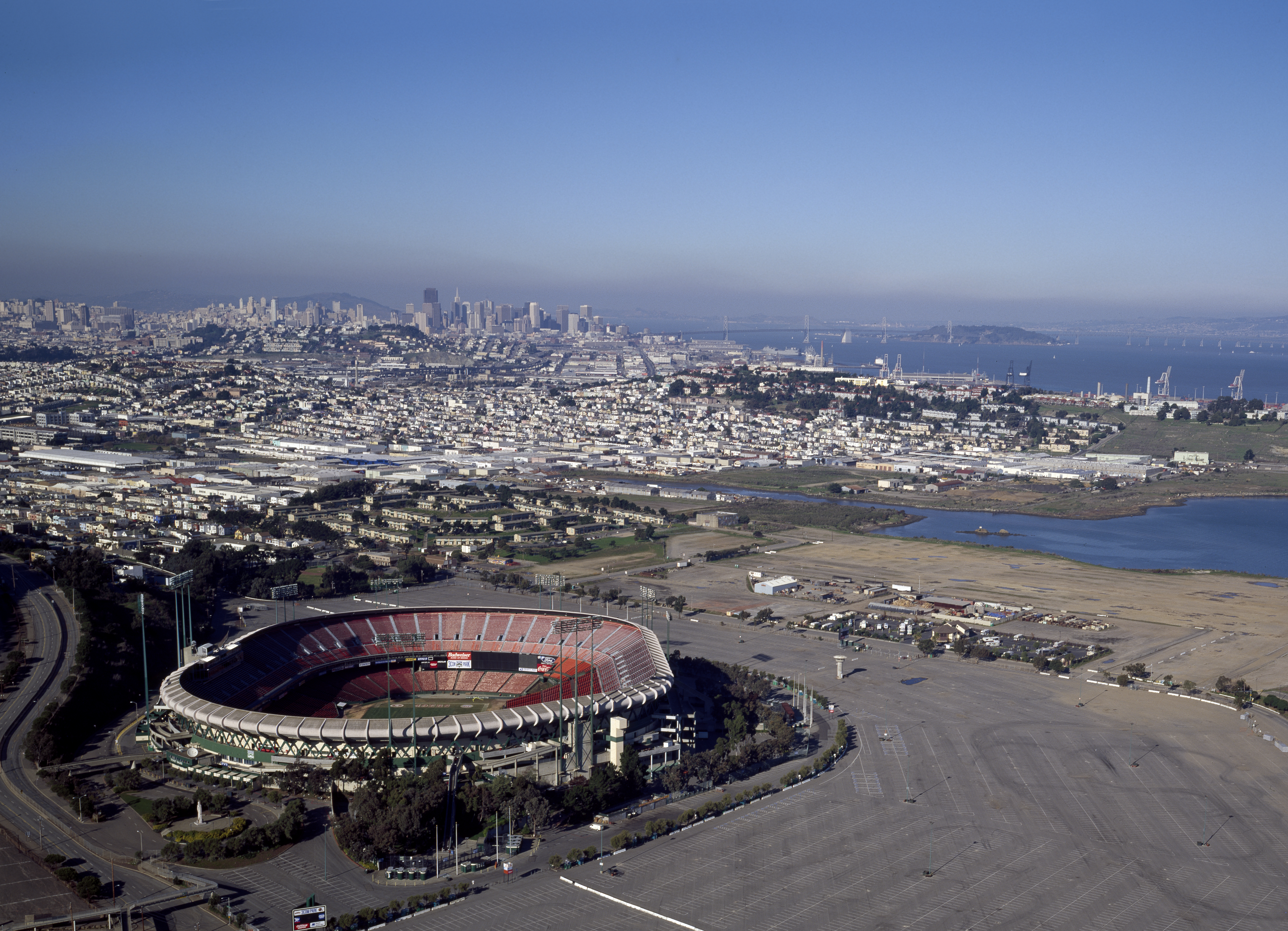
Candlestick Park

This was also the final season in which the San Francisco 49ers played their home games at Candlestick Park, as the team moved into the newly built Levi's Stadium located in Santa Clara, California, for 2014. The 49ers had played in Candlestick since 1971 and the stadium hosted Monday Night Football 36 times, including the stadium's farewell game on December 23. No other facility had as many Monday Night Football appearances. With the departure of the 49ers, Candlestick Park was left without any permanent tenants. On February 3, 2013, plans to demolish Candlestick Park were announced and took place after the final 2013 49ers game.

Two stadiums received new naming rights: In January 2013, Cleveland Browns Stadium was renamed FirstEnergy Stadium. The FirstEnergy Corporation, an energy company based in Akron, Ohio, agreed to pay the Cleveland Browns $6 million per year for 17 years to have its name on the team's stadium. In July 2013, Cowboys Stadium was re-branded as AT&T Stadium, though terms of the naming rights deal remain undisclosed.

== Uniforms ==
Several teams made changes to their uniforms or logos prior to the 2013 season:

- The Jacksonville Jaguars revised their logo and unveiled a new uniform design. The new design includes all black home uniforms, white road jerseys and a teal alternate jersey. The new jerseys include "claw marks" on the shoulders and a "JAGS" patch over the heart. The new helmet design features a paint scheme that fades from matte black in the front to gold in the back.
- The Miami Dolphins updated their logo and unveiled redesigned uniforms. The new logo features a more streamlined dolphin which loses the football helmet and the "fierce" facial expression. The new uniforms keep the same basic color palette, but there is less use of orange. The facemask color on the team's new helmets has been changed from aqua to white.
- The Minnesota Vikings introduced a slightly tweaked "Norseman" logo and unveiled new uniforms. The colors are barely changed, with a new font for the uniform numbers and asymmetrical stripes on the pants. The new helmets feature matte purple paint with glossy logos and black facemasks.
- The San Diego Chargers introduced some relatively minor uniform alterations. The most noticeable change is the switch to "self-color" collars (where the collars match the jersey body) from the previous contrasting color "neck roll" collar design. There were also some changes to the colors used on the nameplates as well as some changes to the socks. The pants and helmets remain unchanged.
- The New York Giants introduced a new alternate uniform consisting of new white pants which may be worn with the team's existing blue jerseys in place of the usual grey pants. The team wore this new alternate uniform on November 10 against the Oakland Raiders and November 24 against the Dallas Cowboys.
- In honor of the fifteenth anniversary of the team's relocation to Nashville, the Tennessee Titans wore their alternate navy blue jerseys in two home games. This marked the first time since 2008 that the Titans wore the navy blue jerseys which were their primary home jerseys in their early Tennessee seasons before they switched to their current light blue jerseys. The Titans also added a patch commemorating the 15th season in Tennessee to their jerseys.
- The Indianapolis Colts added a jersey patch which celebrates the team's 30th season in Indianapolis.

Due to a new recommendation that a player should use the same helmet for all games, several teams were forced to make changes in their plans to use alternate and throwback jerseys, including the following:

- The Tampa Bay Buccaneers shelved their "Creamsicle" throwback uniforms completely. The Patriots similarly chose not to wear their throwback uniforms at all in 2013.
- The Washington Redskins wore their current helmets (with the center stripe decal removed) along with their throwback uniforms which feature a different shade of burgundy.
- The Green Bay Packers also wore their current helmets with their throwback uniforms, but with the stripes and logo decals removed.
- The Dallas Cowboys decided to wear their blue jerseys at their Thanksgiving Day home game, something they have not done since 1963. Traditionally (with the exceptions of 2007 & 2008), the team has worn their 1960-1963 throwback uniforms for the Thanksgiving game.

== U.S. television coverage ==
This was the eighth and final year of the television contracts with CBS, Fox, NBC, and ESPN before the new nine-year contracts began in 2014. CBS and Fox continued to carry the Sunday afternoon AFC and NFC packages, respectively. NBC carried Sunday Night Football, the kickoff game, and the prime-time Thanksgiving game; and ESPN aired seventeen Monday Night games in sixteen weeks.
