= Glenn Young =

American football player (1929–2013)

No. 23
- Position: Defensive back

Personal information
- Born: December 22, 1929; Woodstock, Illinois
- Died: October 13, 2013 (aged 83)
- Listed height: 6 ft 2 in (1.88 m)
- Listed weight: 205 lb (93 kg)

Career information
- High school: Des Plaines (IL) Maine West
- College: Purdue
- NFL draft: 1956: undrafted

Career history
- Green Bay Packers (1956)

Career NFL statistics
- Games played: 4
- Stats at Pro Football Reference

Glenn Young (December 12, 1929 – October 13, 2013) was an American professional football defensive back in the National Football League who played for the Green Bay Packers. He was born in Woodstock, Illinois. Young played his college football at Purdue University and played four professional games with the Green Bay Packers in 1956.
