= 2013 San Francisco 49ers season =

American football team season

- Owner: Jed York
- General manager: Trent Baalke
- Head coach: Jim Harbaugh
- Offensive coordinator: Greg Roman
- Defensive coordinator: Vic Fangio
- Home stadium: Candlestick Park

Results
- Record: 12–4
- Division place: 2nd NFC West
- Playoffs: Won Wild Card Playoffs (at Packers) 23–20; Won Divisional Playoffs (at Panthers) 23–10; Lost NFC Championship (at Seahawks) 17–23
- All-Pros: 5: MLB NaVorro Bowman (1st team); TE Vernon Davis (2nd team); T Joe Staley (2nd team); DE Justin Smith (2nd team); OLB Ahmad Brooks (2nd team)
- Pro Bowlers: 10: RB Frank Gore; TE Vernon Davis; T Joe Staley; G Mike Iupati; DE Justin Smith; OLB Ahmad Brooks; ILB Patrick Willis; ILB NaVorro Bowman; FS Eric Reid; SS Donte Whitner

Uniform
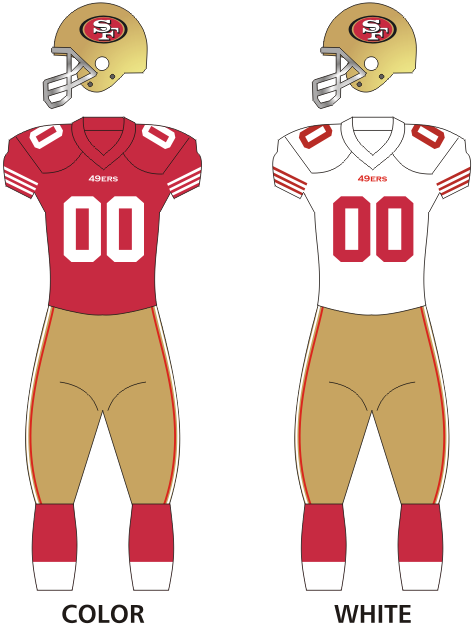

The 2013 season was the San Francisco 49ers' 64th in the National Football League (NFL), their 68th overall and their third under the head coach/general manager tandem of Jim Harbaugh and Trent Baalke. This marked the first season since 2004 that quarterback Alex Smith was not on the roster as he joined the Kansas City Chiefs. This was the 49ers' final season playing their home games at Candlestick Park before moving into Levi's Stadium for the 2014 season.

The 49ers entered the season as the defending NFC champions, qualified for the playoffs as the fifth seed Wild Card, and hoped to win a sixth Super Bowl title, after falling just short during the previous season. The 49ers' defeated the Green Bay Packers 23–20 in the wild-card round and the Carolina Panthers 23–10 in the Divisional round, but lost to their division rival and eventual Super Bowl champion Seattle Seahawks in the NFC Championship by a score of 23–17, failing to join the 1985 New England Patriots, 2005 Pittsburgh Steelers, 2007 New York Giants, and 2010 Green Bay Packers as the only teams to win 3 straight road games in the playoffs.

The 2013 season was the last season in which the San Francisco 49ers qualified for the playoffs or had a winning season until 2019.

== 2013 NFL draft ==
San Francisco 49ers 2013 NFL Draft selections
Draft order		Player name	Position	College	Notes
Round	Selection	Player name	Position	College	Notes
1	18	Eric Reid	FS	LSU	From Cowboys^{[h]}
1	31	Traded to the Dallas Cowboys^{[h]}			
2	34	Traded to the Tennessee Titans^{[i]}			From Chiefs^{[a]}
2	40	Cornellius Carradine	DE	Florida State	From Titans^{[i]}
2	55	Vance McDonald	TE	Rice	From Packers^{[j]}
2	61	Traded to the Green Bay Packers^{[j]}			
3	74	Traded to the Dallas Cowboys^{[h]}			From Panthers^{[b]}
3	88	Corey Lemonier	OLB	Auburn	From Packers^{[k]}
3	93	Traded to the Green Bay Packers^{[k]}			
4	128	Quinton Patton	WR	Louisiana Tech	
4	131	Marcus Lattimore	RB	South Carolina	Compensatory pick
5	157	Quinton Dial	NT	Alabama	From Colts^{[c]}
5	164	Traded to the Cleveland Browns^{[d]}			
6	173	Traded to the Green Bay Packers^{[j]}			From Browns^{[d]}
6	180	Nick Moody	IILB	Florida State	From Dolphins^{[e]}
6	199	Traded to the Baltimore Ravens^{[f]}			
7	216	Traded to the Green Bay Packers^{[k]}			From Titans^{[i]}
7	227	Traded to the Cleveland Browns^{[d]}			From Bengals^{[g]}
7	237	B. J. Daniels	QB	South Florida	
7	246	Carter Bykowski	OT	Iowa State	Compensatory pick
7	252	Marcus Cooper	CB	Rutgers	Compensatory pick

Notes

^{^[a]} The team acquired an additional second-round selection (No. 34 overall) along with a 2014 second-round selection (originally conditional) in a trade that sent quarterback Alex Smith to the Kansas City Chiefs.
^{^[b]} The team acquired an additional third-round selection (No. 74 overall) as part of a trade that sent a 2012 fourth-round selection to the Carolina Panthers.
^{^[c]} The team acquired an additional fifth-round selection (No. 157 overall) as part of a trade that sent a 2012 third-round selection to the Indianapolis Colts.
^{^[d]} The team traded a fifth-round selection (No. 164 overall) and seventh-round selection (No. 227 overall) to the Cleveland Browns for quarterback Colt McCoy and a sixth-round selection (No. 173 overall).
^{^[e]} The team acquired an additional sixth-round selection (No. 180 overall) as part of a trade that sent a 2012 fourth-round selection to the Miami Dolphins.
^{^[f]} The team traded their sixth-round selection (No. 199 overall) to the Baltimore Ravens for wide receiver Anquan Boldin.
^{^[g]} The team acquired an additional seventh-round selection (No. 227 overall) in a trade that sent safety Taylor Mays to the Cincinnati Bengals.
^{^[h]} The team traded their first-round selection (No. 31) and one of their third-round selections (No. 74 overall) to the Dallas Cowboys for a first-round selection (No. 18).
^{^[i]} The team traded one of their second-round selections (No. 34 overall) to the Tennessee Titans for a second-round selection (No. 40 overall), a seventh-round selection (No. 216 overall), and a 2014 third-round selection.
^{^[j]} The team traded a second-round selection (No. 61 overall) and sixth-round selection (No. 173 overall) to the Green Bay Packers for a second-round selection (No. 55 overall).
^{^[k]} The team traded a third-round selection (No. 93 overall) and seventh-round selection (No. 216 overall) to the Green Bay Packers for a third-round selection (No. 88 overall).

== Staff ==
2013 San Francisco 49ers staff
Front office: Co-chairman – Denise DeBartolo York; Co-chairman – John York; CEO/Owner – Jed York; President/co-owner – Gideon Yu; general manager – Trent Baalke; Director of player personnel – Joel Patten; Director of college scouting Matt Malaspina; Director of football administration – Brian Hampton; Head coaches: Head coach – Jim Harbaugh; Offensive coaches: Offensive coordinator – Greg Roman; Quarterbacks – Geep Chryst; Running backs – Tom Rathman; Wide receivers – John Morton; Tight ends – Reggie Davis; Offensive line – Tim Drevno; Offensive line – Mike Solari; Offensive assistant – Michael Christianson; Offensive assistant – Ejiro Evero; Offensive consultant – Eric Mangini	Defensive coaches: Defensive coordinator – Vic Fangio; Defensive line – Jim Tomsula; Linebackers – Jim Leavitt; Secondary – Ed Donatell; Assistant secondary – Greg Jackson; Defensive assistant/quality control – Peter Hansen; Special teams coaches: Assistant head coach/special teams coordinator – Brad Seely; Special teams assistant – Tracy Smith; Strength and conditioning: Head strength and conditioning – Mark Uyeyama; Assistant strength and conditioning – Kevin Tolbert

== Final roster ==
2013 San Francisco 49ers roster
Quarterbacks (QB): 7 Colin Kaepernick; 2 Colt McCoy; Running backs (RB): 24 Anthony Dixon; 21 Frank Gore; 32 Kendall Hunter; 23 LaMichael James; 48 Will Tukuafu FB; Wide receivers (WR): 84 Jon Baldwin; 81 Anquan Boldin; 15 Michael Crabtree; 14 Kassim Osgood; 11 Quinton Patton; Tight ends (TE): 46 Derek Carrier; 88 Garrett Celek; 85 Vernon Davis; 83 Demarcus Dobbs; 89 Vance McDonald	Offensive linemen (OL): 75 Alex Boone G; 76 Anthony Davis T; 59 Jonathan Goodwin C; 77 Mike Iupati G; 67 Daniel Kilgore C; 78 Joe Looney G; 62 Ryan Seymour G; 68 Adam Snyder G; 74 Joe Staley T; Defensive linemen (DL): 71 Quinton Dial NT; 90 Glenn Dorsey NT; 63 Tony Jerod-Eddie DE; 91 Ray McDonald DE; 94 Justin Smith DE	Linebackers (LB): 53 NaVorro Bowman ILB; 55 Ahmad Brooks OLB; 96 Corey Lemonier OLB; 54 Nick Moody ILB; 51 Dan Skuta OLB; 99 Aldon Smith OLB; 57 Michael Wilhoite ILB; 52 Patrick Willis ILB; Defensive backs (DB): 26 Tramaine Brock CB; 25 Tarell Brown CB; 43 Craig Dahl SS; 40 Darryl Morris CB; 35 Eric Reid FS; 22 Carlos Rogers CB; 27 C. J. Spillman FS; 41 Ray Ventrone SS; 31 Donte Whitner SS; 30 Eric Wright CB; Special teams (ST): 9 Phil Dawson K; 4 Andy Lee P; 47 Kevin McDermott LS	Practice squad: 5 McLeod Bethel-Thompson QB; 69 Carter Bykowski T; 33 Jewel Hampton RB; 17 Chuck Jacobs WR; 65 Al Netter G; 64 Mike Purcell NT; 28 Dax Swanson CB; 19 Devon Wylie WR; Reserve: 95 Tank Carradine DE (IR); 13 Brandon Carswell WR (IR); 29 Chris Culliver CB (IR); 44 Alex Debniak FB (IR); 58 Darius Fleming OLB (IR); 38 Marcus Lattimore RB (NF-Inj.); 82 Mario Manningham WR (IR); 64 Luke Marquardt T (NF-Inj.); 49 Bruce Miller FB (IR); 98 Lawrence Okoye DE (IR); 93 Ian Williams NT (IR); Rookies in italics 52 active, 11 reserve, 8 practice squad

== Preseason ==
Week	Date	Opponent	Result	Record	Venue	Recap
1	August 8	Denver Broncos	L 6–10	0–1	Candlestick Park	Recap
2	August 16	at Kansas City Chiefs	W 15–13	1–1	Arrowhead Stadium	Recap
3	August 25	Minnesota Vikings	W 34–14	2–1	Candlestick Park	Recap
4	August 29	at San Diego Chargers	W 41–6	3–1	Qualcomm Stadium	Recap

== Regular season ==
=== Schedule ===
Week	Date	Opponent	Result	Record	Venue	Recap
1	September 8	Green Bay Packers	**W** 34–28	1–0	Candlestick Park	Recap
2	September 15	at **Seattle Seahawks**	**L** 3–29	1–1	CenturyLink Field	Recap
3	September 22	Indianapolis Colts	**L** 7–27	1–2	Candlestick Park	Recap
4	September 26	at **St. Louis Rams**	**W** 35–11	2–2	Edward Jones Dome	Recap
5	October 6	Houston Texans	**W** 34–3	3–2	Candlestick Park	Recap
6	October 13	**Arizona Cardinals**	**W** 32–20	4–2	Candlestick Park	Recap
7	October 20	at Tennessee Titans	**W** 31–17	5–2	LP Field	Recap
8	October 27	at Jacksonville Jaguars	**W** 42–10	6–2	Wembley Stadium (London, England)	Recap
9	Bye					
10	November 10	Carolina Panthers	**L** 9–10	6–3	Candlestick Park	Recap
11	November 17	at New Orleans Saints	**L** 20–23	6–4	Mercedes-Benz Superdome	Recap
12	November 25	at Washington Redskins	**W** 27–6	7–4	FedExField	Recap
13	December 1	**St. Louis Rams**	**W** 23–13	8–4	Candlestick Park	Recap
14	December 8	**Seattle Seahawks**	**W** 19–17	9–4	Candlestick Park	Recap
15	December 15	at Tampa Bay Buccaneers	**W** 33–14	10–4	Raymond James Stadium	Recap
16	December 23	Atlanta Falcons	**W** 34–24	11–4	Candlestick Park	Recap
17	December 29	at **Arizona Cardinals**	**W** 23–20	12–4	University of Phoenix Stadium	Recap
Note: Intra-division opponents are in **bold** text.

=== Game summaries ===
==== Week 1: vs. Green Bay Packers ====
Week One: Green Bay Packers at San Francisco 49ers – Game summary

Quarter	1	2	3	4	Total
Packers	7	7	7	7	**28**
**49ers**	7	7	7	13	**34**

at Candlestick Park, San Francisco, California

- Date: September 8
- Game time: 1:25 p.m. PDT
- Game weather: 69 °F (21 °C), sunny and breezy
- Game attendance: 69,732
- Referee: Bill Leavy
- TV announcers (Fox): Joe Buck, Troy Aikman and Pam Oliver
- Recap, Game book

Game information

**First quarter**

- SF – Vernon Davis 20-yard pass from Colin Kaepernick (Phil Dawson kick), 2:52. 49ers 7–0. **Drive: 13 plays, 83 yards, 6:59.**
- GB – Randall Cobb 5-yard pass from Aaron Rodgers (Mason Crosby kick), 1:05. Tied 7–7. **Drive: 6 plays, 80 yards, 1:47.**

**Second quarter**

- SF – Anquan Boldin 10-yard pass from Colin Kaepernick (Phil Dawson kick), 8:57. 49ers 14–7. **Drive: 3 plays, 14 yards, 2:18.**
- GB – Jermichael Finley 12-yard pass from Aaron Rodgers (Mason Crosby kick), 0:16. Tied 14–14. **Drive: 8 plays, 62 yards, 1:16.**

**Third quarter**

- SF – Vernon Davis 2-yard pass from Colin Kaepernick (Phil Dawson kick), 9:46. 49ers 21–14. **Drive: 9 plays, 80 yards, 5:14.**
- GB – Jordy Nelson 8-yard pass from Aaron Rodgers (Mason Crosby kick), 3:19. Tied 21–21. **Drive: 7 plays, 69 yards, 2:48.**

**Fourth quarter**

- SF – Phil Dawson 27-yard field goal, 14:17. 49ers 24–21. **Drive: 10 plays, 71 yards, 4:32.**
- GB – Eddie Lacy 2-yard run (Mason Crosby kick), 8:26. Packers 28–24. **Drive: 8 plays, 76 yards, 2:30.**
- SF – Frank Gore 1-yard run (Phil Dawson kick), 5:47. 49ers 31–28. **Drive: 5 plays, 80 yards, 2:39.**
- SF – Phil Dawson 33-yard field goal, 0:26. 49ers 34–28. **Drive: 11 plays, 50 yards, 4:26.**

**Top passers**

- GB – Aaron Rodgers – 21/37, 333 yards, 3 TD, INT
- SF – Colin Kaepernick – 27/39, 412 yards, 3 TD

**Top rushers**

- GB – Eddie Lacy – 14 rushes, 41 yards, TD
- SF – Frank Gore – 20 rushes, 44 yards, TD

**Top receivers**

- GB – Jordy Nelson – 7 receptions, 130 yards, TD
- SF – Anquan Boldin – 13 receptions, 208 yards, TD

Colin Kaepernick set a career-high with 412 yards passing and three touchdowns, the first 400-yard passing game by a 49ers quarterback since Tim Rattay on October 10, 2004, as well as the first 400-yard, three-touchdown passing game since Jeff Garcia in 1999. Anquan Boldin, making his debut as a 49er, racked up 208 yards receiving on 13 receptions, and scored a touchdown. Vernon Davis had 6 receptions for 98 yards and two touchdowns.

==== Week 2: at Seattle Seahawks ====
Week Two: San Francisco 49ers at Seattle Seahawks – Game summary

Quarter	1	2	3	4	Total
49ers	0	0	3	0	**3**
**Seahawks**	0	5	7	17	**29**

at CenturyLink Field, Seattle, Washington

- Date: September 15
- Game time: 5:30 pm. PDT
- Game weather: 64 °F (18 °C), cloudy
- Game attendance: 68,338
- Referee: John Parry
- TV announcers (NBC): Al Michaels, Cris Collinsworth and Michele Tafoya
- Recap, Game book

Game information

**First quarter**

- No scoring plays.

**Second quarter**

- SEA – Penalty on Bruce Miller enforced in the end zone for a safety, 10:39. Seahawks 2–0.
- SEA – Steven Hauschka 30-yard field goal, 5:52. Seahawks 5–0. **Drive: 6 plays, 17 yards, 2:15.**

**Third quarter**

- SEA – Marshawn Lynch 14-yard run (Steven Hauschka kick), 9:12. Seahawks 12–0. **Drive: 10 plays, 80 yards, 5:48.**
- SF – Phil Dawson 21-yard field goal, 4:20. Seahawks 12–3. **Drive: 9 plays, 71 yards, 4:52.**

**Fourth quarter**

- SEA – Marshawn Lynch 7-yard pass from Russell Wilson (Steven Hauschka kick), 13:44. Seahawks 19–3. **Drive: 10 plays, 80 yards, 5:36.**
- SEA – Steven Hauschka 37-yard field goal, 11:31. Seahawks 22–3. **Drive: 4 plays, 6 yards, 1:36.**
- SEA – Marshawn Lynch 2-yard run (Steven Hauschka kick), 4:22. Seahawks 29–3. **Drive: 1 play, 2 yards, 0:04.**

**Top passers**

- SF – Colin Kaepernick – 13/28, 127 yards, 3 INT
- SEA – Russell Wilson – 8/19, 142 yards, TD, INT

**Top rushers**

- SF – Colin Kaepernick – 9 rushes, 87 yards
- SEA – Marshawn Lynch – 28 rushes, 98 yards, 2 TD

**Top receivers**

- SF – Kyle Williams – 4 receptions, 39 yards
- SEA – Marshawn Lynch – 3 receptions, 37 yards, TD

Seattle comfortably beat the 49ers for the second consecutive season at home, with the Seahawks defense proving far too strong.

==== Week 3: vs. Indianapolis Colts ====
Week Three: Indianapolis Colts at San Francisco 49ers – Game summary

Quarter	1	2	3	4	Total
**Colts**	7	3	3	14	**27**
49ers	7	0	0	0	**7**

at Candlestick Park, San Francisco, California

- Date: September 22
- Game time: 1:25 pm. PDT
- Game weather: 66 °F (19 °C), sunny
- Game attendance: 69,732
- Referee: Terry McAulay
- TV announcers (CBS): Jim Nantz and Phil Simms
- Recap, Game book

Game information

**First quarter**

- IND – Trent Richardson 1-yard run (Adam Vinatieri kick), 11:20. Colts 7–0. **Drive: 7 plays, 80 yards, 3:40.**
- SF – Kendall Hunter 13-yard run (Phil Dawson kick), 4:13. Tied 7–7. **Drive: 9 plays, 91 yards, 4:34.**

**Second quarter**

- IND – Adam Vinatieri 43-yard field goal, 7:00. Colts 10–7. **Drive: 8 plays, 30 yards, 4:48.**

**Third quarter**

- IND – Adam Vinatieri 41-yard field goal, 6:46. Colts 13–7. **Drive: 10 plays, 52 yards, 5:08.**

**Fourth quarter**

- IND – Andrew Luck 6-yard run (Adam Vinatieri kick), 4:13. Colts 20–7. **Drive: 11 plays, 80 yards, 7:01.**
- IND – Ahmad Bradshaw 1-yard run (Adam Vinatieri kick), 2:55. Colts 27–7. **Drive: 3 plays, 8 yards, 0:56.**

**Top passers**

- IND – Andrew Luck – 17/26, 159 yards
- SF – Colin Kaepernick – 13/27, 150 yards, INT

**Top rushers**

- IND – Ahmad Bradshaw – 19 rushes, 95 yards, TD
- SF – Frank Gore – 11 rushes, 70 yards

**Top receivers**

- IND – Darrius Heyward-Bey – 5 receptions, 59 yards
- SF – Anquan Boldin – 5 receptions, 67 yards

The 49ers were heavily beaten for the second straight week to fall to a 1–2 record. The Colts' running game and defensive strength proved too strong in Kaepernick's first home defeat as a starter.

==== Week 4: at St. Louis Rams ====
Week Four: San Francisco 49ers at St. Louis Rams – Game summary

Quarter	1	2	3	4	Total
**49ers**	0	14	7	14	**35**
Rams	3	0	0	8	**11**

at Edward Jones Dome, St. Louis, Missouri

- Date: September 26
- Game time: 7:25 p.m. CDT/5:25 pm. PDT
- Game weather: Played indoors (dome stadium)
- Game attendance: 56,640
- Referee: Jeff Triplette
- TV announcers (NFLN): Brad Nessler, Mike Mayock and Alex Flanagan
- Recap, Game book

Game information

**First quarter**

- STL – Greg Zuerlein 40-yard field goal, 7:09. Rams 3–0. **Drive: 5 plays, 35 yards, 1:57.**

**Second quarter**

- SF – Anquan Boldin 20-yard pass from Colin Kaepernick (Phil Dawson kick), 6:22. 49ers 7–3. **Drive: 7 plays, 80 yards, 2:55.**
- SF – Frank Gore 34-yard run (Phil Dawson kick), 0:37. 49ers 14–3. **Drive: 8 plays, 80 yards, 3:19.**

**Third quarter**

- SF – Vernon Davis 12-yard pass from Colin Kaepernick (Phil Dawson kick), 8:49. 49ers 21–3. **Drive: 11 plays, 88 yards, 5:03.**

**Fourth quarter**

- SF – Anthony Dixon 1-yard run (Phil Dawson kick), 10:15. 49ers 28–3. **Drive: 2 plays, 3 yards, 0:48.**
- STL – Lance Kendricks 6-yard pass from Sam Bradford (Benny Cunningham run), 5:44. 49ers 28–11. **Drive: 4 plays, 24 yards, 0:57.**
- SF – Kendall Hunter 29-yard run (Phil Dawson kick), 4:25. 49ers 35–11. **Drive: 4 plays, 42 yards, 1:19.**

**Top passers**

- SF – Colin Kaepernick – 15/23, 167 yards, 2 TD
- STL – Sam Bradford – 19/41, 202 yards, TD, INT

**Top rushers**

- SF – Frank Gore – 20 rushes, 153 yards, TD
- STL – Daryl Richardson – 12 rushes, 16 yards

**Top receivers**

- SF – Anquan Boldin – 5 receptions, 90 yards, TD
- STL – Austin Pettis – 5 receptions, 59 yards

The 49ers season got back on track with a heavy Thursday Night Football victory over divisional opponent St Louis. Both the passing and running offense were effective in the victory, a positive sign of things to come, while the defense was its usual strong.

==== Week 5: vs. Houston Texans ====
Week Five: Houston Texans at San Francisco 49ers – Game summary

Quarter	1	2	3	4	Total
Texans	0	0	3	0	**3**
**49ers**	14	7	3	10	**34**

at Candlestick Park, San Francisco, California

- Date: October 6
- Game time: 5:30 pm. PDT
- Game weather: 76 °F (24 °C), sunny
- Game attendance: 69,732
- Referee: Mike Carey
- TV announcers (NBC): Al Michaels, Cris Collinsworth and Michele Tafoya
- Recap, Game book

Game information

**First quarter**

- SF – Tramaine Brock 18-yard interception return (Phil Dawson kick), 13:30. 49ers 7–0.
- SF – Frank Gore 1-yard run (Phil Dawson kick), 1:37. 49ers 14–0. **Drive: 12 plays, 65 yards, 5:51.**

**Second quarter**

- SF – Anthony Dixon 2-yard run (Phil Dawson kick), 5:03. 49ers 21–0. **Drive: 4 plays, 32 yards, 1:58.**

**Third quarter**

- HOU – Randy Bullock 41-yard field goal, 12:01. 49ers 21–3. **Drive: 7 plays, 43 yards, 2:36.**
- SF – Phil Dawson 38-yard field goal, 5:15. 49ers 24–3. **Drive: 8 plays, 39 yards, 3:20.**

**Fourth quarter**

- SF – Vernon Davis 64-yard pass from Colin Kaepernick (Phil Dawson kick), 14:16. 49ers 31–3. **Drive: 3 plays, 69 yards, 1:09.**
- SF – Phil Dawson 24-yard field goal, 10:46. 49ers 34–3. **Drive: 4 plays, 2 yards, 2:31.**

**Top passers**

- HOU – Matt Schaub – 19/35, 173 yards, 3 INT
- SF – Colin Kaepernick – 6/15, 113 yards, TD

**Top rushers**

- HOU – Arian Foster – 21 rushes, 98 yards
- SF – Frank Gore – 17 rushes, 81 yards, TD

**Top receivers**

- HOU – Owen Daniels – 6 receptions, 60 yards
- SF – Vernon Davis – 3 receptions, 88 yards, TD

Another large victory gave the 49ers their first back-to-back victories of the season. Quarterback Colin Kaepernick only completed 6 of his 15 passes, with the running attack and defense at the top of their games. Frank Gore and Anthony Dixon ran for touchdowns, while cornerback Tramaine Brock picked off two Matt Schaub passes, one for a touchdown on Schaub's first pass of the game, with Tony Jerod-Eddie also picking up an interception. The 49ers improved to 3–2, just one game off the 4–1 Seattle Seahawks in the battle for NFC West, who had lost to the Indianapolis Colts.

==== Week 6: vs. Arizona Cardinals ====
Week Six: Arizona Cardinals at San Francisco 49ers – Game summary

Quarter	1	2	3	4	Total
Cardinals	7	7	6	0	**20**
**49ers**	6	16	0	10	**32**

at Candlestick Park, San Francisco, California

- Date: October 13
- Game time: 1:25 pm. PDT/MST
- Game weather: 65 °F (18 °C), sunny
- Game attendance: 69,732
- Referee: Scott Green
- TV announcers (Fox): Kevin Burkhardt, John Lynch and Molly McGrath
- Recap, Game book

Game information

**First quarter**

- SF – Phil Dawson 35-yard field goal, 9:37. 49ers 3–0. **Drive: 4 plays, −10 yards, 1:00.**
- SF – Phil Dawson 26-yard field goal, 4:31. 49ers 6–0. **Drive: 4 plays, 3 yards, 1:35.**
- ARI – Larry Fitzgerald 75-yard pass from Carson Palmer (Jay Feely kick), 3:06. Cardinals 7–6. **Drive: 3 plays, 80 yards, 1:25.**

**Second quarter**

- SF – Carson Palmer sacked in the end zone by Corey Lemonier for a safety, 9:22. 49ers 8–7.
- SF – Vernon Davis 61-yard pass from Colin Kaepernick (Phil Dawson kick), 8:31. 49ers 15–7. **Drive: 2 plays, 71 yards, 0:51.**
- ARI – Andre Ellington 15-yard run (Jay Feely kick), 7:03. 49ers 15–14. **Drive: 3 plays, 80 yards, 1:28.**
- SF – Vernon Davis 35-yard pass from Colin Kaepernick (Phil Dawson kick), 1:55. 49ers 22–14. **Drive: 3 plays, 58 yards, 0:59.**

**Third quarter**

- ARI – Michael Floyd 10-yard pass from Carson Palmer (pass failed), 8:12. 49ers 22–20. **Drive: 9 plays, 61 yards, 4:33.**

**Fourth quarter**

- SF – Kendall Hunter 6-yard run (Phil Dawson kick), 6:35. 49ers 29–20. **Drive: 18 plays, 89 yards, 9:32.**
- SF – Phil Dawson 44-yard field goal, 4:15. 49ers 32–20. **Drive: 4 plays, 5 yards, 1:41.**

**Top passers**

- ARI – Carson Palmer – 25/41, 298 yards, 2 TD, 2 INT
- SF – Colin Kaepernick – 16/29, 252 yards, 2 TD, INT

**Top rushers**

- ARI – Andre Ellington – 7 rushes, 56 yards, TD
- SF – Frank Gore – 25 rushes, 101 yards

**Top receivers**

- ARI – Larry Fitzgerald – 6 receptions, 117 yards, TD
- SF – Vernon Davis – 8 receptions, 180 yards, 2 TD

A third straight win for the 49ers as the offense and defense sparked. Colin Kaepernick had 252 yards for two touchdowns, both to Vernon Davis, Frank Gore ran for 101 yards, and the defense forced four turnovers for the second consecutive game.

==== Week 7: at Tennessee Titans ====
Week Seven: San Francisco 49ers at Tennessee Titans – Game summary

Quarter	1	2	3	4	Total
**49ers**	3	14	7	7	**31**
Titans	0	0	0	17	**17**

at LP Field, Nashville, Tennessee

- Date: October 20
- Game time: 3:05 pm. CDT/1:05 pm. PDT
- Game weather: 68 °F (20 °C), sunny
- Game attendance: 69,143
- Referee: Ron Winter
- TV announcers (Fox): Chris Myers, Tim Ryan and Jennifer Hale
- Recap, Game book

Game information

**First quarter**

- SF – Phil Dawson 44-yard field goal, 5:19. 49ers 3–0. **Drive: 12 plays, 65 yards, 6:34.**

**Second quarter**

- SF – Colin Kaepernick 20-yard run (Phil Dawson kick), 6:42. 49ers 10–0. **Drive: 8 plays, 80 yards, 4:46.**
- SF – Frank Gore 1-yard run (Phil Dawson kick), 2:07. 49ers 17–0. **Drive: 6 plays, 45 yards, 3:02.**

**Third quarter**

- SF – Frank Gore 1-yard run (Phil Dawson kick), 7:20. 49ers 24–0. **Drive: 12 plays, 79 yards, 7:40.**

**Fourth quarter**

- TEN – Rob Bironas 31-yard field goal, 12:23. '49ers 24–3. **Drive: 11 plays, 67 yards, 3:43.**
- TEN – Chris Johnson 66-yard pass from Jake Locker (Rob Bironas kick), 7:07. 49ers 24–10. **Drive: 2 plays, 86 yards, 0:35.**
- SF – Kassim Osgood fumble recovery in the end zone (Phil Dawson kick), 6:16. 49ers 31–10.
- TEN – Delanie Walker 26-yard pass from Jake Locker (Rob Bironas kick), 3:17. 49ers 31–17. **Drive: 10 plays, 58 yards, 2:59.**

**Top passers**

- SF – Colin Kaepernick – 13/21, 199 yards
- TEN – Jake Locker – 25/41, 326 yards, 2 TD, INT

**Top rushers**

- SF – Frank Gore – 24 rushes, 70 yards, 2 TD
- TEN – Chris Johnson – 9 rushes, 39 yards

**Top receivers**

- SF – Anquan Boldin – 5 receptions, 74 yards
- TEN – Kendall Wright – 9 receptions, 98 yards

The 49ers cruised to a fourth consecutive win thanks to a strong running game, with Frank Gore picking up 70 yards for 2 touchdowns and Colin Kaepernick 68 yards for 1 touchdown. The final scoreline was flattering for the young Titans, who fell to a 24–0 deficit at the end of the third quarter. A muffed punt for a touchdown for Kassim Osgood was also a highlight for the 49ers.

==== Week 8: at Jacksonville Jaguars ====
NFL International Series

Week Eight: San Francisco 49ers at Jacksonville Jaguars – Game summary

Quarter	1	2	3	4	Total
**49ers**	14	14	7	7	**42**
Jaguars	0	3	7	0	**10**

at Wembley Stadium, London, England

- Date: October 27
- Game time: 5:00 p.m. GMT/10:00 am. PDT
- Game weather: 60 °F (16 °C), rain showers
- Game attendance: 83,559
- Referee: Ed Hochuli
- TV announcers (Fox): Chris Myers, Tim Ryan and Jennifer Hale
- Recap, Game book

Game information

**First quarter**

- SF – Frank Gore 19-yard run (Phil Dawson kick), 11:42. 49ers 7–0. **Drive: 8 plays, 76 yards, 3:18.**
- SF – Colin Kaepernick 12-yard run (Phil Dawson kick), 2:36. 49ers 14–0. **Drive: 8 plays, 80 yards, 4:14.**

**Second quarter**

- SF – Vernon Davis 2-yard pass from Colin Kaepernick (Phil Dawson kick), 11:52. 49ers 21–0. **Drive: 10 plays, 72 yards, 4:41.**
- SF – Colin Kaepernick 9-yard run (Phil Dawson kick), 7:49. 49ers 28–0. **Drive: 6 plays, 63 yards, 2:38.**
- JAX – Josh Scobee 38-yard field goal, 0:10. 49ers 28–3. **Drive: 12 plays, 60 yards, 2:40.**

**Third quarter**

- JAX – Mike Brown 3-yard pass from Chad Henne (Josh Scobee kick), 3:00. 49ers 28–10. **Drive: 3 plays, 28 yards, 0:52.**
- SF – Frank Gore 19-yard run (Phil Dawson kick), 0:52. 49ers 35–10. **Drive: 4 plays, 54 yards, 2:08.**

**Fourth quarter**

- SF – Dan Skuta 47-yard fumble return (Phil Dawson kick), 13:24. 49ers 42–10.

**Top passers**

- SF – Colin Kaepernick – 10/16, 164 yards, TD
- JAX – Chad Henne – 29/45, 228 yards, TD

**Top rushers**

- SF – Kendall Hunter – 9 rushes, 84 yards
- JAX – Maurice Jones-Drew – 19 rushes, 75 yards

**Top receivers**

- SF – Anquan Boldin – 4 receptions, 56 yards
- JAX – Cecil Shorts III – 7 receptions, 74 yards

Frank Gore and Colin Kaepernick each ran for two touchdowns in the 49ers comfortable victory over the 0–7 Jaguars at Wembley Stadium in London, the eighth NFL match the venue has hosted, to improve to 6–2.

==== Week 10: vs. Carolina Panthers ====
Week Ten: Carolina Panthers at San Francisco 49ers – Game summary

Quarter	1	2	3	4	Total
**Panthers**	0	7	0	3	**10**
49ers	3	6	0	0	**9**

at Candlestick Park, San Francisco, California

- Date: November 10
- Game time: 1:05 pm. PST
- Game weather: 62 °F (17 °C), sunny
- Game attendance: 69,732
- Referee: Carl Cheffers
- TV announcers (Fox): Thom Brennaman, Brian Billick and Laura Okmin
- Recap, Game book

Game information

**First quarter**

- SF – Phil Dawson 52-yard field goal, 10:45. 49ers 3–0. **Drive: 9 plays, 46 yards, 4:15.**

**Second quarter**

- SF – Phil Dawson 43-yard field goal, 13:34. 49ers 6–0. **Drive: 5 plays, 16 yards, 1:43.**
- SF – Phil Dawson 25-yard field goal, 6:16. 49ers 9–0. **Drive: 5 plays, 17 yards, 2:42.**
- CAR – DeAngelo Williams 17-yard run (Graham Cano kick), 1:52. 49ers 9–7. **Drive: 8 plays, 80 yards, 4:24.**

**Third quarter**

- No scoring plays.

**Fourth quarter**

- CAR – Graham Gano 53-yard field goal, 5:04. Panthers 10–9. **Drive: 7 plays, 9 yards, 3:30.**

**Top passers**

- CAR – Cam Newton – 16/32, 169 yards, INT
- SF – Colin Kaepernick – 11/22, 91 yards, INT

**Top rushers**

- CAR – DeAngelo Williams – 8 rushes, 46 yards, TD
- SF – Frank Gore – 16 rushes, 82 yards

**Top receivers**

- CAR – Steve Smith – 6 receptions, 63 yards
- SF – Mario Manningham – 3 receptions, 30 yards

After five straight victories, the 49ers dropped another home match following their bye. The Panthers' defense was too strong, limiting Colin Kaepernick to 91 yards and an interception as the 49ers could only score three field goals. The mid-game loss of tight end Vernon Davis and safety Eric Reid to concussions did not aid the 49ers cause as they fell to 6–3.

==== Week 11: at New Orleans Saints ====
Week Eleven: San Francisco 49ers at New Orleans Saints – Game summary

Quarter	1	2	3	4	Total
49ers	0	10	7	3	**20**
**Saints**	7	7	0	9	**23**

at Mercedes-Benz Superdome, New Orleans, Louisiana

- Date: November 17
- Game time: 3:25 pm. CST/1:25 pm. PST
- Game weather: Played indoors (dome stadium)
- Game attendance: 73,025
- Referee: Tony Corrente
- TV announcers (Fox): Joe Buck, Troy Aikman and Pam Oliver
- Recap, Game book

Game information

**First quarter**

- NO – Josh Hill 3-yard pass from Drew Brees (Garrett Hartley kick), 0:44. Saints 7–0. **Drive: 11 plays, 97 yards, 6:44.**

**Second quarter**

- SF – Anquan Boldin 11-yard pass from Colin Kaepernick (Phil Dawson kick), 10:16. Tied 7–7. **Drive: 2 plays, 11 yards, 0:10.**
- SF – Phil Dawson 55-yard field goal, 3:34. 49ers 10–7. **Drive: 6 plays, 43 yards, 2:51.**
- NO – Jed Collins 1-yard run (Garrett Hartley kick), 1:58. Saints 14–10. **Drive: 3 plays, 21 yards, 1:36.**

**Third quarter**

- SF – Vernon Davis 17-yard pass from Colin Kaepernick (Phil Dawson kick), 10:52. 49ers 17–14. **Drive: 3 plays, 22 yards, 1:15.**

**Fourth quarter**

- SF – Phil Dawson 29-yard field goal, 13:22. 49ers 20–14. **Drive: 13 plays, 49 yards, 6:11.**
- NO – Garrett Hartley 21-yard field goal, 7:50. 49ers 20–17. **Drive: 9 plays, 77 yards, 5:33.**
- NO – Garrett Hartley 42-yard field goal, 2:06. Tied 20–20. **Drive: 12 plays, 48 yards, 4:42.**
- NO – Garrett Hartley 31-yard field goal, 0:00. Saints 23–20. **Drive: 6 plays, 47 yards, 1:41.**

**Top passers**

- SF – Colin Kaepernick – 17/31, 127 yards, 2 TD, INT
- NO – Drew Brees – 30/43, 305 yards, TD, INT

**Top rushers**

- SF – Frank Gore – 13 rushes, 48 yards
- NO – Pierre Thomas – 11 rushes, 49 yards

**Top receivers**

- SF – Anquan Boldin – 6 receptions, 56 yards, TD
- NO – Marques Colston – 5 receptions, 80 yards

Another set of back-to-back losses came in controversial circumstance for the 49ers that saw the team slip to 6–4. The 49ers led 20–17 with less than five minutes to go in the final quarter, before two Garrett Hartley field goals won it for the Saints, the second as time expired. On the drive leading to the first or these field goals, linebacker Ahmad Brooks was flagged for a contentious personal foul on Drew Brees for a blow to the neck on a sack and fumble, leading to a 15-yard penalty. Colin Kaepernick's three and out between the field goals also was a major contributor to the Saints' victory.

==== Week 12: at Washington Redskins ====
Week Twelve: San Francisco 49ers at Washington Redskins – Game summary

Quarter	1	2	3	4	Total
**49ers**	7	3	14	3	**27**
Redskins	0	6	0	0	**6**

at FedExField, Landover, Maryland

- Date: November 25
- Game time: 8:40 p.m. EST/5:40 pm. PST
- Game weather: 37 °F (3 °C), clear
- Game attendance: 79,773
- Referee: John Parry
- TV announcers (ESPN): Mike Tirico, Jon Gruden and Lisa Salters
- Recap, Game book

Game information

**First quarter**

- SF – Anquan Boldin 19-yard pass from Colin Kaepernick (Phil Dawson kick), 3:02. 49ers 7–0. **Drive: 7 plays, 62 yards, 3:19.**

**Second quarter**

- SF – Phil Dawson 29-yard field goal, 12:14. 49ers 10–0. **Drive: 5 plays, 47 yards, 2:51.**
- WAS – Kai Forbath 36-yard field goal, 6:48. 49ers 10–3. **Drive: 13 plays, 63 yards, 5:26.**
- WAS – Kai Forbath 35-yard field goal, 0:04. 49ers 10–6. **Drive: 11 plays, 62 yards, 4:55.**

**Third quarter**

- SF – Anquan Boldin 6-yard pass from Colin Kaepernick (Phil Dawson kick), 9:33. 49ers 17–6. **Drive: 6 plays, 60 yards, 2:41.**
- SF – Vernon Davis 1-yard pass from Colin Kaepernick (Phil Dawson kick), 1:09. 49ers 24–6. **Drive: 5 plays, 39 yards, 2:30.**

**Fourth quarter**

- SF – Phil Dawson 49-yard field goal, 9:08. 49ers 27–6. **Drive: 11 plays, 24 yards, 5:47.**

**Top passers**

- SF – Colin Kaepernick – 15/24, 235 yards, 3 TD
- WAS – Robert Griffin III – 16/26, 118 yards, INT

**Top rushers**

- SF – Frank Gore – 13 rushes, 31 yards
- WAS – Alfred Morris – 14 rushes, 52 yards

**Top receivers**

- SF – Anquan Boldin – 5 receptions, 94 yards, 2 TD
- WAS – Pierre Garçon – 8 receptions, 48 yards

The 49ers got back to winning ways with a comfortable victory in Washington. Colin Kaepernick hit form with 235 yards and 3 touchdowns, while Redskins' quarterback Robert Griffin III threw just 118 yards and an interception in addition to being sacked 4 times, in a match-up between what are widely considered two of the league's best young quarterbacks. The 49ers improved to 7–4 as they looked to seal a playoff spot and pressure Seattle for the NFC West crown.

==== Week 13: vs. St. Louis Rams ====
Week Thirteen: St. Louis Rams at San Francisco 49ers – Game summary

Quarter	1	2	3	4	Total
Rams	0	3	3	7	**13**
**49ers**	3	10	3	7	**23**

at Candlestick Park, San Francisco, California

- Date: December 1
- Game time: 3:05 pm. CST/1:05 pm. PST
- Game weather: 59 °F (15 °C), sunny
- Game attendance: 69,732
- Referee: Bill Vinovich
- TV announcers (Fox): Kevin Burkhardt, John Lynch and Molly McGrath
- Recap, Game book

Game information

**First quarter**

- SF – Phil Dawson 32-yard field goal, 7:36. 49ers 3–0. **Drive: 12 plays, 53 yards, 5:15.**

**Second quarter**

- SF – Phil Dawson 43-yard field goal, 14:16. 49ers 6–0. **Drive: 10 plays, 47 yards, 6:33.**
- SF – Frank Gore 3-yard run (Phil Dawson kick), 6:15. 49ers 13–0. **Drive: 12 plays, 72 yards, 6:00.**
- STL – Greg Zuerlein 43-yard field goal, 0:54. 49ers 13–3. **Drive: 13 plays, 44 yards, 5:21.**

**Third quarter**

- STL – Greg Zuerlein 34-yard field goal, 8:56. 49ers 13–6. **Drive: 8 plays, 33 yards, 4:35.**
- SF – Phil Dawson 24-yard field goal, 3:25. 49ers 16–6. **Drive: 10 plays, 72 yards, 5:31.**

**Fourth quarter**

- SF – Vernon Davis 17-yard pass from Colin Kaepernick (Phil Dawson kick), 14:31. 49ers 23–6. **Drive: 1 play, 17 yards, 0:10.**
- STL – Brian Quick 3-yard pass from Kellen Clemens (Greg Zuerlein kick), 0:18. 49ers 23–13. **Drive: 10 plays, 92 yards, 2:04.**

**Top passers**

- STL – Kellen Clemens – 19/37, 218 yards, TD, INT
- SF – Colin Kaepernick – 19/28, 275 yards, TD

**Top rushers**

- STL – Zack Stacy – 19 rushes, 72 yards
- SF – Frank Gore – 15 rushes, 42 yards, TD

**Top receivers**

- STL – Jared Cook – 3 receptions, 49 yards
- SF – Anquon Boldin – 9 receptions, 98 yards

The 49ers defeated the Rams for the second time this season on the back of strong performances from the passing offense. Colin Kaepernick threw for 275 yards and a touchdown, Anquan Boldin caught nine passes for 98 yards, Michael Crabtree caught a 60-yard pass in his first game for six months following an achilles injury, and Vernon Davis athletically hurdled his way over a defender on two separate occasions for 82 yards and a touchdown, the 49ers improving to 8–4.

==== Week 14: vs. Seattle Seahawks ====
Week Fourteen: Seattle Seahawks at San Francisco 49ers – Game summary

Quarter	1	2	3	4	Total
Seahawks	0	14	0	3	**17**
**49ers**	6	10	0	3	**19**

at Candlestick Park, San Francisco, California

- Date: December 8
- Game time: 1:25 pm. PST
- Game weather: 43 °F (6 °C), sunny
- Game attendance: 69,732
- Referee: Clete Blakeman
- TV announcers (Fox): Joe Buck, Troy Aikman, Pam Oliver and Erin Andrews
- Recap, Game book

Game information

**First quarter**

- SF – Phil Dawson 23-yard field goal, 5:04. 49ers 3–0. **Drive: 10 plays, 56 yards, 4:44.**
- SF – Phil Dawson 48-yard field goal, 0:58. 49ers 6–0. **Drive: 4 plays, 4 yards, 0:54.**

**Second quarter**

- SEA – Marshawn Lynch 11-yard run (Steven Hauschka kick), 12:17. Seahawks 7–6. **Drive: 8 plays, 80 yards, 3:41.**
- SF – Phil Dawson 52-yard field goal, 7:56. 49ers 9–7. **Drive: 10 plays, 40 yards, 4:21.**
- SEA – Luke Willson 39-yard pass from Russell Wilson (Steven Hauschka kick), 3:47. Seahawks 14–9. **Drive: 7 plays, 72 yards, 4:09.**
- SF – Vernon Davis 8-yard pass from Colin Kaepernick (Phil Dawson kick), 0:06. 49ers 16–14. **Drive: 9 plays, 72 yards, 3:41.**

**Third quarter**

- No scoring plays.

**Fourth quarter**

- SEA – Steven Hauschka 31-yard field goal, 6:20. Seahawks 17–16. **Drive: 7 plays, 14 yards, 2:57.**
- SF – Phil Dawson 22-yard field goal, 0:26. 49ers 19–17. **Drive: 11 plays, 76 yards, 5:54.**

**Top passers**

- SEA – Russell Wilson – 15/25, 199 yards, TD, INT
- SF – Colin Kaepernick – 15/29, 175 yards, TD, INT

**Top rushers**

- SEA – Marshawn Lynch – 20 rushes, 72 yards, TD
- SF – Frank Gore – 17 rushes, 110 yards

**Top receivers**

- SEA – Luke Willson – 3 receptions, 70 yards, TD
- SF – Anquan Boldin – 6 receptions, 93 yards

Seeking to avenge their week 2 loss in Seattle, the 49ers defense held Seahawks quarter back Russell Wilson and running back Marshawn Lynch to 199 passing yards and 72 rushing yards respectively. 4 field goals from kicker Phil Dawson, an 8-yard touchdown pass to tight end Vernon Davis, and a 51-yard run by running back Frank Gore in the fourth quarter lifted the 49ers to a 19–17 victory and improved their record to 9–4. The win also continued the Seahawks' losing streak at Candlestick Park since 2008. This would not be the last time these two teams would meet as they met again in the 2013 NFC Championship game. This was the 49ers' last win over the Seahawks until 2018.

==== Week 15: at Tampa Bay Buccaneers ====
Week Fifteen: San Francisco 49ers at Tampa Bay Buccaneers – Game summary

Quarter	1	2	3	4	Total
**49ers**	7	10	3	13	**33**
Buccaneers	0	7	0	7	**14**

at Raymond James Stadium, Tampa, Florida

- Date: December 15
- Game time: 1:00 pm. EST/10:00 am. PST
- Game weather: 70 °F (21 °C), cloudy
- Game attendance: 64,142
- Referee: Scott Green
- TV announcers (Fox): Dick Stockton, Ronde Barber and Kris Budden
- Recap, Game book

Game information

**First quarter**

- SF – Michael Crabtree 4-yard pass from Colin Kaepernick (Phil Dawson kick), 7:14. 49ers 7–0. **Drive: 11 plays, 62 yards, 6:56.**

**Second quarter**

- SF – Phil Dawson 47-yard field goal, 6:19. 49ers 10–0. **Drive: 9 plays, 28 yards, 4:45.**
- SF – Vernon Davis 52-yard pass from Colin Kaepernick (Phil Dawson kick), 1:56. 49ers 17–0. **Drive: 5 plays, 81 yards, 1:52.**
- TB – Vincent Jackson 11-yard pass from Mike Glennon (Rian Lindell kick), 0:35. 49ers 17–7. **Drive: 7 plays, 80 yards, 1:18.**

**Third quarter**

- SF – Phil Dawson 43-yard field goal, 7:56. 49ers 20–7. **Drive: 8 plays, 19 yards, 2:59.**

**Fourth quarter**

- TB – Tim Wright 24-yard pass from Mike Glennon (Rian Lindell kick), 15:00. 49ers 20–14. **Drive: 10 plays, 92 yards, 4:01.**
- SF – Phil Dawson 21-yard field goal, 4:31. 49ers 23–14. **Drive: 17 plays, 77 yards, 10:27.**
- SF – Kendall Hunter 2-yard fumble return (Phil Dawson kick), 4:21. 49ers 30–14.
- SF – Phil Dawson 35-yard field goal, 2:53. 49ers 33–14. **Drive: 4 plays, 9 yards, 0:55.**

**Top passers**

- SF – Colin Kaepernick – 19/29, 203 yards, 2 TD
- TB – Mike Glennon – 18/34, 179 yards, 2 TD, INT

**Top rushers**

- SF – Frank Gore – 22 rushes, 86 yards
- TB – Bobby Rainey – 11 rushes, 27 yards

**Top receivers**

- SF – Vernon Davis – 5 receptions, 79 yards, TD
- TB – Tim Wright – 7 receptions, 82 yards, TD

The 10th win of the season and fourth consecutive win came easily as the 49ers looked to clinch a playoff spot. Vernon Davis caught a touchdown for the fifth consecutive game and Michael Crabtree caught his first touchdown since returning from injury, as Colin Kaepernick threw for 203 yards and two touchdowns.

==== Week 16: vs. Atlanta Falcons ====
Week Sixteen: Atlanta Falcons at San Francisco 49ers – Game summary

Quarter	1	2	3	4	Total
Falcons	0	10	0	14	**24**
**49ers**	3	0	10	21	**34**

at Candlestick Park, San Francisco, California

- Date: December 23
- Game time: 5:40 pm. PST
- Game weather: 60 °F (16 °C), clear
- Game attendance: 69,732
- Referee: Walt Coleman
- TV announcers (ESPN): Mike Tirico, Jon Gruden and Lisa Salters
- Recap, Game book

Game information

**First quarter**

- SF – Phil Dawson 49-yard field goal, 7:56. 49ers 3–0. **Drive: 8 plays, 37 yards, 3:39.**

**Second quarter**

- ATL – Steven Jackson 2-yard run (Matt Bryant kick), 9:53. Falcons 7–3. **Drive: 7 plays, 80 yards, 4:25.**
- ATL – Matt Bryant 35-yard field goal, 0:05. Falcons 10–3. **Drive: 9 plays, 30 yards, 1:36.**

**Third quarter**

- SF – Anquan Boldin 10-yard pass from Colin Kaepernick (Phil Dawson kick), 12:03. 49ers 10–10. **Drive: 6 plays, 83 yards, 2:57.**
- SF – Phil Dawson 30-yard field goal, 3:16. 49ers 13–10. **Drive: 11 plays, 68 yards, 6:13.**

**Fourth quarter**

- SF – Colin Kaepernick 4-yard run (Phil Dawson kick), 12:34. 49ers 20–10. **Drive: 9 plays, 61 yards, 4:38.**
- ATL – Roddy White 39-yard pass from Matt Ryan (Matt Bryant kick), 8:34. 49ers 20–17. **Drive: 7 plays, 69 yards, 4:00.**
- SF – Frank Gore 1-yard run (Phil Dawson kick), 5:04. 49ers 27–17. **Drive: 6 plays, 76 yards, 3:30.**
- ATL – Tony Gonzalez 2-yard pass from Matt Ryan (Matt Bryant kick), 2:09. 49ers 27–24. **Drive: 11 plays, 80 yards, 2:55.**
- SF – NaVorro Bowman 89-yard interception return (Phil Dawson kick), 1:11. 49ers 34–24.

**Top passers**

- ATL – Matt Ryan – 37/48, 348 yards, 2 TD, 2 INT
- SF – Colin Kaepernick – 13/21, 197 yards, TD

**Top rushers**

- ATL – Steven Jackson – 16 rushes, 53 yards, TD
- SF – Frank Gore – 21 rushes, 97 yards, TD

**Top receivers**

- ATL – Roddy White – 12 receptions, 141 yards, TD
- SF – Michael Crabtree – 5 receptions, 102 yards

The 49ers played their final game at Candlestick Park on Monday Night Football against the Atlanta Falcons. Their 34–24 victory came after an interception by NaVorro Bowman with 1:28 left in the game. The play would seal a win for a playoff spot for the 49ers and is called The Pick at the Stick by some sports columnists. This game was also Candlestick Park's 36th and final game on Monday Night Football, the most at any stadium used by the NFL.

==== Week 17: at Arizona Cardinals ====
Week Seventeen: San Francisco 49ers at Arizona Cardinals – Game summary

Quarter	1	2	3	4	Total
**49ers**	17	0	0	6	**23**
Cardinals	0	7	0	13	**20**

at University of Phoenix Stadium, Glendale, Arizona

- Date: December 29
- Game time: 2:25 p.m. MST/1:25 pm. PST
- Game weather: 64 °F (18 °C), sunny (retractable roof open)
- Game attendance: 63,570
- Referee: Walt Anderson
- TV announcers (Fox): Kenny Albert, Daryl Johnston and Tony Siragusa
- Recap, Game book

Game information

**First quarter**

- SF – Phil Dawson 27-yard field goal, 10:37. 49ers 3–0. **Drive: 8 plays, 53 yards, 2:55.**
- SF – Anquan Boldin 4-yard pass from Colin Kaepernick (Phil Dawson kick), 8:33. 49ers 10–0. **Drive: 5 plays, 22 yards, 1:15.**
- SF – Vernon Davis 3-yard pass from Colin Kaepernick (Phil Dawson kick), 0:52. 49ers 17–0. **Drive: 4 plays, 72 yards, 2:23.**

**Second quarter**

- ARI – Jake Ballard 1-yard pass from Carson Palmer (Jay Feely kick), 4:46. 49ers 17–7. **Drive: 10 plays, 88 yards, 5:44.**

**Third quarter**

- No scoring plays.

**Fourth quarter**

- ARI – Jay Feely 49-yard field goal, 14:47. 49ers 17–10. **Drive: 11 plays, 54 yards, 4:09.**
- ARI – Andre Roberts 34-yard pass from Carson Palmer (Jay Feely kick), 3:20. Tied 17–17. **Drive: 5 plays, 60 yards, 2:28.**
- SF – Phil Dawson 56-yard field goal, 1:45. 49ers 20–17. **Drive: 7 plays, 41 yards, 1:35.**
- ARI – Jay Feely 43-yard field goal, 0:29. Tied 20–20. **Drive: 8 plays, 55 yards, 1:16.**
- SF – Phil Dawson 40-yard field goal, 0:00. 49ers 23–20. **Drive: 3 plays, 42 yards, 0:29.**

**Top passers**

- SF – Colin Kaepernick – 21/34, 310 yards, 2 TD
- ARI – Carson Palmer – 28/49, 407 yards, 2 TD, INT

**Top rushers**

- SF – Quinton Patton – 1 rush, 26 yards
- ARI – Rashard Mendenhall – 10 rushes, 47 yards

**Top receivers**

- SF – Anquan Boldin – 9 receptions, 149 yards, TD
- ARI – Larry Fitzgerald – 6 receptions, 113 yards

Phil Dawson kicked a 40-yard field goal as time expired to lock up the 5th seed for the 49ers. The 49ers started on fire, leading 17–0 after the first quarter, with the Cardinals showing courage and determination in their fightback, squaring the game at 20–20 before LaMichael James' 45-yard kickoff return and two quick completions by Colin Kaepernick set up Dawson's game winner. Anquan Boldin was very impressive, catching nine passes for 149 yards and a touchdown in his first game back in Arizona after the Cardinals traded him to Baltimore prior to the 2010 season. The 49ers finished the season with an impressive 12–4 record, half a win better than the previous season, to give them second place in NFC West and the 5th seed in the playoffs (the 49ers won the NFC West and had the #2 seed in 2012), securing them a trip to Green Bay in the wild-card round.

=== Standings ===
==== Division ====
NFC West
	W	L	T	PCT	DIV	CONF	PF	PA	STK
^{(1)} Seattle Seahawks	13	3	0	.813	4–2	10–2	417	231	W1
^{(5)} San Francisco 49ers	12	4	0	.750	5–1	9–3	406	272	W6
Arizona Cardinals	10	6	0	.625	2–4	6–6	379	324	L1
St. Louis Rams	7	9	0	.438	1–5	4–8	348	364	L1

==== Conference ====
NFC
#	Team	Division	W	L	T	PCT	DIV	CONF	SOS	SOV	STK
**Division winners**
1	Seattle Seahawks	West	13	3	0	.813	4–2	10–2	.490	.445	W1
2	Carolina Panthers	South	12	4	0	.750	5–1	9–3	.494	.451	W3
3	Philadelphia Eagles	East	10	6	0	.625	4–2	9–3	.453	.391	W2
4	Green Bay Packers	North	8	7	1	.531	3–2–1	6–5–1	.453	.371	W1
**Wild cards**
5	San Francisco 49ers	West	12	4	0	.750	5–1	9–3	.494	.414	W6
6	New Orleans Saints	South	11	5	0	.688	5–1	9–3	.516	.455	W1
**Did not qualify for the postseason**
7	Arizona Cardinals	West	10	6	0	.625	2–4	6–6	.531	.444	L1
8 (Note: Chicago defeated Dallas head-to-head (Week 14, 45–28).)	Chicago Bears	North	8	8	0	.500	2–4	4–8	.465	.469	L2
9	Dallas Cowboys	East	8	8	0	.500	5–1	7–5	.484	.363	L1
10 (Note: The NY Giants and Detroit finished with a better conference record than St. Louis.) (Note: The NY Giants defeated Detroit head-to-head (Week 16, 23–20 (OT)).)	New York Giants	East	7	9	0	.438	3–3	6–6	.520	.366	W2
11 (Note: Detroit finished with a better conference record than St. Louis.)	Detroit Lions	North	7	9	0	.438	4–2	6–6	.457	.402	L4
12	St. Louis Rams	West	7	9	0	.438	1–5	4–8	.551	.446	L1
13	Minnesota Vikings	North	5	10	1	.344	2–3–1	4–7–1	.512	.450	W1
14 (Note: Atlanta finished with a better conference record than Tampa Bay.)	Atlanta Falcons	South	4	12	0	.250	1–5	3–9	.553	.313	L2
15	Tampa Bay Buccaneers	South	4	12	0	.250	1–5	2–10	.574	.391	L3
16	Washington Redskins	East	3	13	0	.188	0–6	1–11	.516	.438	L8
**Tiebreakers** (Note: When breaking ties for three or more teams under the NFL's rules, they are first broken within divisions, then comparing only the highest-ranked remaining team from each division.)

== Postseason ==
=== Schedule ===
Week	Date	Opponent	Result	Record	Venue	Recap
Wild Card	January 5, 2014	at Green Bay Packers (4)	W 23–20	1–0	Lambeau Field	Recap
Divisional	January 12, 2014	at Carolina Panthers (2)	W 23–10	2–0	Bank of America Stadium	Recap
NFC Championship	January 19, 2014	at Seattle Seahawks (1)	L 17–23	2–1	CenturyLink Field	Recap

=== Game summaries ===
==== NFC Wild Card Round: at Green Bay Packers ====
NFC Wild Card Round: #5 San Francisco 49ers at #4 Green Bay Packers – Game summary

Quarter	1	2	3	4	Total
49ers	6	7	0	10	23
Packers	0	10	0	10	20

at Lambeau Field, Green Bay, Wisconsin

- Date: January 5, 2014
- Game time: 3:40 p.m. CST/1:40 p.m. PST
- Game weather: 5 °F (−15 °C), cloudy, wind chill −10 °F (−23 °C)
- Game attendance: 77,525
- Referee: Ed Hochuli
- TV announcers (Fox): Joe Buck, Troy Aikman, Pam Oliver and Erin Andrews
- Recap, Game book

Game information

First quarter

- SF – Phil Dawson 22-yard field goal, 9:00. 49ers 3–0. Drive: 13 plays, 69 yards, 4:28.
- SF – Phil Dawson 25-yard field goal, 2:17. 49ers 6–0. Drive: 11 plays, 42 yards, 4:49.

Second quarter

- GB – Jordy Nelson 5-yard pass from Aaron Rodgers (Mason Crosby kick), 5:50. Packers 7–6. Drive: 14 plays, 70 yards, 7:18.
- SF – Frank Gore 10-yard run (Phil Dawson kick), 2:48. 49ers 13–7. Drive: 5 plays, 68 yards, 3:02.
- GB – Mason Crosby 34-yard field goal, 0:00. 49ers 13–10. Drive: 9 plays, 59 yards, 2:48.

Third quarter

- No scoring plays.

Fourth quarter

- GB – John Kuhn 1-yard run (Mason Crosby kick), 12:06. Packers 17–13. Drive: 12 plays, 80 yards, 6:13.
- SF – Vernon Davis 28-yard pass from Colin Kaepernick (Phil Dawson kick), 10:31. 49ers 20–17. Drive: 4 plays, 63 yards, 1:35.
- GB – Mason Crosby 24-yard field goal, 5:06. Tied 20–20. Drive: 11 plays, 61 yards, 5:25.
- SF – Phil Dawson 33-yard field goal, 0:00. 49ers 23–20. Drive: 14 plays, 65 yards, 5:06.

Top passers

- SF – Colin Kaepernick – 16/30, 227 yards, TD, INT
- GB – Aaron Rodgers – 17/26, 177 yards, TD

Top rushers

- SF – Colin Kaepernick – 7 rushes, 98 yards
- GB – Eddie Lacy – 21 rushes, 81 yards

Top receivers

- SF – Michael Crabtree – 8 receptions, 125 yards
- GB – Jordy Nelson – 7 receptions, 62 yards, TD

In one of the coldest games in NFL playoff history, Colin Kaepernick threw for 227 yards and ran for a game-high 98 as the 49ers beat the Packers 23–20. The Packers tied the game at 20 with a field goal with 5:06 left, but Kaepernick led the 49ers down the field to set up a game-winning 33-yard field goal by Phil Dawson as time expired. The 49ers are now 4–0 against Green Bay in the last two years, after going 1–11 against them (including playoffs) from 1995 to 2010. This was also the first time ever the 49ers won at Green Bay in the playoffs.

==== NFC Divisional Round: at Carolina Panthers ====
NFC Divisional Round: #5 San Francisco 49ers at #2 Carolina Panthers;– Game summary

Quarter	1	2	3	4	Total
49ers	6	7	7	3	23
Panthers	0	10	0	0	10

at Bank of America Stadium, Charlotte, North Carolina

- Date: January 12, 2014
- Game time: 1:05 p.m. EST/10:05 am. PST
- Game weather: 57 °F (14 °C), sunny
- Game attendance: 73,784
- Referee: Carl Cheffers
- TV announcers (Fox): Joe Buck, Troy Aikman and Pam Oliver
- Recap, Game book

Game information

First quarter

- SF – Phil Dawson 49-yard field goal, 9:12. 49ers 3–0. Drive: 13 plays, 49 yards, 5:48.
- SF – Phil Dawson 33-yard field goal, 4:33. 49ers 6–0. Drive: 6 plays, 31 yards, 1:45.

Second quarter

- CAR – Steve Smith 31-yard pass from Cam Newton (Graham Gano kick), 13:40. Panthers 7–6. Drive: 1 play, 31 yards, 0:07.
- CAR – Graham Gano 24-yard field goal, 3:41. Panthers 10–6. Drive: 13 plays, 73 yards, 8:59.
- SF – Vernon Davis 1-yard pass from Colin Kaepernick (Phil Dawson kick), 0:05. 49ers 13–10. Drive: 12 plays, 80 yards, 3:36.

Third quarter

- SF – Colin Kaepernick 4-yard run (Phil Dawson kick), 8:53. 49ers 20–10. Drive: 8 plays, 77 yards, 4:32.

Fourth quarter

- SF – Phil Dawson 34-yard field goal, 7:41. 49ers 23–10. Drive: 13 plays, 73 yards, 7:58.

Top passers

- SF – Colin Kaepernick – 15/28, 196 yards, TD
- CAR – Cam Newton – 16/25, 267 yards, TD, 2 INT

Top rushers

- SF – Frank Gore – 17 rushes, 84 yards
- CAR – Cam Newton – 10 rushes, 54 yards

Top receivers

- SF – Anquan Boldin – 8 receptions, 136 yards
- CAR – Ted Ginn Jr. – 4 receptions, 104 yards

The 49ers advanced to their third consecutive NFC Championship game by beating a red hot Carolina Panthers team, 23–10. Coming into the game, the Panthers had won eleven of their last twelve games and finished the season ranked number two in total defense. This game was a rematch from week 10, with the Panthers winning 10–9. This time though, it was the 49ers who would come out victorious. Two key goal line stands by the 49ers defense in the second quarter (including a stop on fourth-and-goal at the 1-yard line) were the major difference in the game. The 49ers defense shut the Panthers out in the second half with constant pressure on Cam Newton, sacking him twice and intercepting a pass late in the fourth quarter that shut down any chance Carolina had at a comeback. Colin Kaepernick went 15 for 28 for 196 yards and a touchdown, while Anquan Boldin had 8 catches for 136 yards. The 23 points by the 49ers were the most points the Panthers allowed at home this year. The 49ers then headed to Seattle.

==== NFC Championship Game: at Seattle Seahawks ====
NFC Championship Game: #5 San Francisco 49ers at #1 Seattle Seahawks – Game summary

Quarter	1	2	3	4	Total
49ers	3	7	7	0	17
Seahawks	0	3	10	10	23

at CenturyLink Field, Seattle, Washington

- Date: January 19
- Game time: 3:30 pm. PST
- Game weather: 43 °F (6 °C), cloudy
- Game attendance: 68,454
- Referee: Gene Steratore
- TV announcers (Fox): Joe Buck, Troy Aikman, Pam Oliver and Erin Andrews
- Recap, Game book

Game information

First quarter

- SF – Phil Dawson 25-yard field goal, 12:45. 49ers 3–0. Drive: 4 plays, 8 yards, 2:05.

Second quarter

- SF – Anthony Dixon 1-yard run (Phil Dawson kick), 10:03. 49ers 10–0. Drive: 9 plays, 86 yards, 4:46.
- SEA – Steven Hauschka 32-yard field goal, 5:47. 49ers 10–3. Drive: 9 plays, 62 yards, 4:16.

Third quarter

- SEA – Marshawn Lynch 40-yard run (Steven Hauschka kick), 9:51. Tied 10–10. Drive: 4 plays, 60 yards, 2:15.
- SF – Anquan Boldin 26-yard pass from Colin Kaepernick (Phil Dawson kick), 6:29. 49ers 17–10. Drive: 6 plays, 83 yards, 3:22.
- SEA – Steven Hauschka 40-yard field goal, 3:55. 49ers 17–13. Drive: 5 plays, 11 yards, 2:34.

Fourth quarter

- SEA – Jermaine Kearse 35-yard pass from Russell Wilson (Steven Hauschka kick), 13:44. Seahawks 20–17. Drive: 8 plays, 62 yards, 4:03.
- SEA – Steven Hauschka 47-yard field goal, 3:37. Seahawks 23–17. Drive: 7 plays, 11 yards, 4:00.

Top passers

- SF – Colin Kaepernick – 14/24, 153 yards, TD, 2 INT
- SEA – Russell Wilson – 16/25, 215 yards, TD

Top rushers

- SF – Colin Kaepernick – 11 rushes, 130 yards
- SEA – Marshawn Lynch – 22 rushes, 109 yards, TD

Top receivers

- SF – Anquan Boldin – 5 receptions, 53 yards, TD
- SEA – Doug Baldwin – 6 receptions, 106 yards

Though the 49ers led 10–3 at halftime, the Seahawks came back and then survived a late 49ers comeback attempt. With Seattle leading 20–17 in the fourth quarter, Colin Kaepernick attempted to rally his team, but fumbled once and threw two interceptions in the final three 49ers possessions of the game. Seahawks outscored San Francisco 20–7 in the second half. In the fourth quarter, NaVorro Bowman suffered a major knee injury on a tackle and forced fumble near the goal line; his recovery of the ensuing fumble was not seen by the officials (and the league later agreed that the officials had missed the call); the 49ers forced another fumble on the next play and recovered it, but they could not take advantage. In the last minute of play, Kaepernick again had the 49ers in position to try for a win, but his pass to Michael Crabtree in the end zone was deflected by Richard Sherman and intercepted by Malcolm Smith, clinching the win for Seattle. The contest between the two elite defenses led many to consider the game a quasi-Super Bowl, as popular opinion was that the 49ers and Seahawks were the two best teams in the NFL. This opinion was only cemented further after the Seahawks defeated the Denver Broncos 43–8 in the Super Bowl.
