= Eden Prairie High School =

American public high school

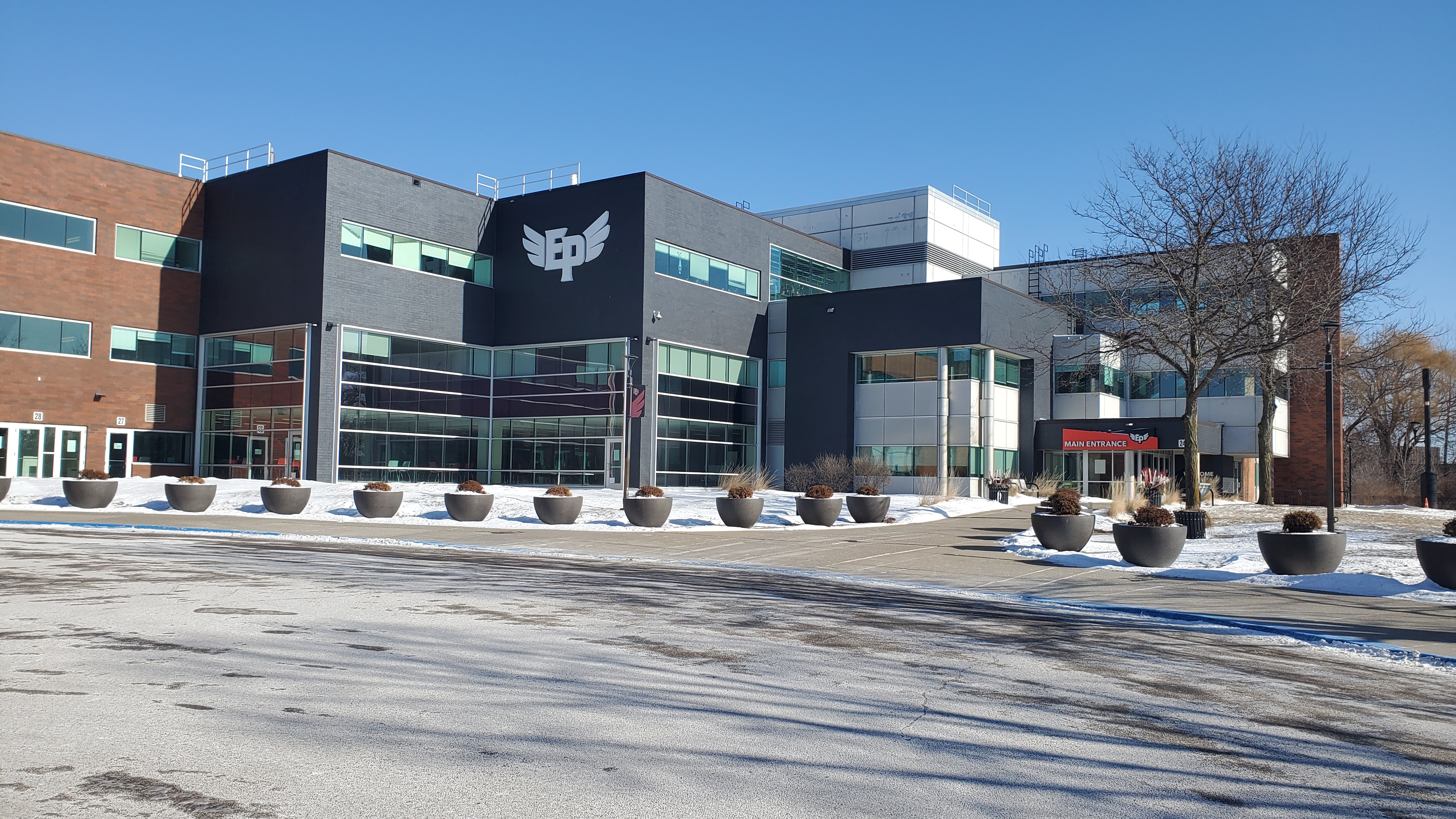

Location
- 17185 Valley View Road; Eden Prairie, (Hennepin County), Minnesota; United States; 44°52′20″N 93°29′40″W

Information
- Former name: Eden Prairie Senior High School
- School type: Public, high school
- Established: 1923; 103 years ago
- Principal: Jaysen Anderson
- Teaching staff: 145.06 (FTE)
- Grades: 9–12
- Enrollment: 2,844 (2024–2025)
- Student to teacher ratio: 19.30
- Colors: Red; White; Black
- Mascot: Eagle
- Rival: Edina High School
- Newspaper: The Eyrie
- Website: Official website

Eden Prairie High School (EPHS) is a four-year public high school in Eden Prairie, Minnesota, United States established in 1923. It was named a Blue Ribbon School of Excellence in 1996 by the United States Department of Education. Eden Prairie High School is accredited by the North Central Association of Colleges and Secondary Schools and the Minnesota Department of Education.

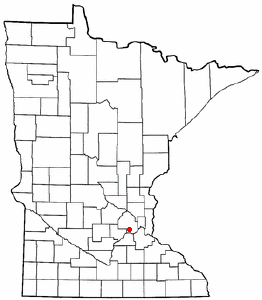
Map of Minnesota with Eden Prairie highlighted

== History ==
In the late 1800s and early 1900s, Eden Prairie was served by four one-room schoolhouses: Anderson, Gould, Jarrett, and Wolf. As the city grew, the student population was regathered into the Eden Prairie Consolidated School. Eventually, Eden Prairie High School was officially established in 1923.

The present high school building opened in 1981 and was significantly added to in 1990, 1994 and 1997. Today, the building is divided into four wings on three floors. The North Wing is home to the auditorium, the Performing Arts Center, two gyms, machine shops, EagleVision television studios, and classrooms. The South Wing contains the Old Commons lunch room, classrooms, science labs, a photography lab, and Special Services facilities. In the East Wing are the New Commons lunch room and classrooms while the West Wing houses labs and additional classrooms. Each department has a resource center near the classrooms.

== Demographics ==
As of 2025, Eden Prairie High School has 2,844 students. 47.1% of students were White, 18.6% were African American, 15.6% were Asian, 11.5% were Hispanic, and 6.9% were two or more races. The school has a 94% graduation rate.

== Academics ==
The high school offers over 425 courses, many of which are electives. Language courses include Spanish, French, Sign Language, German and Chinese. Class size ranges from 29 to 34 students.

== Student activities ==
Student activities include fine arts; academic teams such as Quiz Bowl, Knowledge Bowl, and Future Problem Solvers; Team 2502, a robotics team; a variety of clubs, including the Eyrie newspaper and eagLIT literary magazine; and both varsity and intramural sports. Eden Prairie boasts a wide variety of extracurricular activities including Band, Ceramics Sculpture, Chess Team, Chorus, Computer Arts, Dance, Drawing Painting, Orchestra, Math Team, Photography, Theater Drama, Bible Study, and Video Film Production.

== Athletics ==
Eden Prairie High School is a member of the Lake Conference in the Minnesota State High School League. In 2006, the football team was ranked by MaxPreps as the No. 11 team in the nation following a win in the 2006 State Championship. In 2007, Sports Illustrated named Eden Prairie the top high school athletic program in Minnesota. The high school was also recognized by Sports Illustrated as one of the Top Ten Athletic Programs in 2008–09. In the 2001–02 school year, Eden Prairie's athletic budget was $1,460,433, the highest per capita of any high school in Minnesota. Eden Prairie is the only high school in Minnesota to send a team (pom squad) to the UDA National Dance Team Championship, where they have claimed seven national titles (1996, 2002, 2004, 2006, 2009, 2010, 2011)..

State championships
| Season | Sport | Number of championships | Year |
|---|---|---|---|
| Fall | Soccer, boys' | 2 | 2002, 2011 |
| Fall | Soccer, girls' | 2 | 2005, 2010 |
| Fall | Cross country running, boys' | 1 | 2009 |
| Fall | Cross country running, girls' | 3 | 1980, 2008, 2010 |
| Fall | Football | 11 | 1996, 1997, 2000, 2002, 2006, 2007, 2011, 2012, 2013, 2014, 2017 |
| Fall | Volleyball, girls' | 1 | 2011 |
| Fall | Swimming and diving, girls' | 4 | 1996, 1997, 1998, 1999^{[1]} |
| Winter | Alpine skiing, boys' | 1 | 2005 |
| Winter | Nordic skiing, boys' | 3 | 1983, 1984, 2013 |
| Winter | Hockey, boys' | 3 | 2009, 2011, 2021 |
| Winter | Hockey, girls' | 3 | 2006, 2008, 2016 |
| Winter | Competitive cheerleading team | 4 | 2001, 2002, 2003, 2004 |
| Winter | Dance team, girls' | 5 | 1994, 1995, 1996, 2002, 2003 |
| Winter | Gymnastics, girls' | 5 | 1987, 1988, 1991, 1992, 2005 |
| Winter | Swimming and diving, boys' | 7 | 2002, 2003, 2005, 2012, 2013, 2016, 2023 |
| Winter | Drumline | 7 | 2013, 2014, 2015, 2016, 2017, 2018, 2019 |
| Winter | Quiz Bowl league | 6 | 1994, 1996, 2007, 2008, 2010, 2014 |
| Spring | Baseball | 3 | 2004, 2010, 2017 |
| Spring | Softball | 1 | 2002 |
| Spring | Badminton | 1 | 2001 |
| Spring | NAQT Quiz Bowl State | 5 | 2006, 2007, 2008, 2010, 2014 |
| Spring | Mock trial | 1 (not varsity) | 1996 |
| Spring | Golf, boys' | 2 | 1999, 2013 |
| Spring | Tennis, boys' | 1 | 2010 |
| Spring | Track, boys' | 2 | 2008, 2010 |
| Spring | Lacrosse, boys' | 4 ^{[2]} | 2004, 2012, 2013, 2014 |
| Spring | Lacrosse, girls' | 7 ^{[2]} | 2001, 2004, 2005, 2006, 2007, 2009, 2015, 2016, 2017 |
| Spring | Volleyball, boys' | 1 | 2025 |
| Total | | 95 | |

1. The 1999 state championship resulted in a tie between Eden Prairie High School and Edina High School.
2. The Minnesota State High School League's first lacrosse tournaments for boys and girls were held in 2007. Prior to that year lacrosse was a U.S. Lacrosse Association certified club sport.

== Notable alumni ==
- Adam Bartley, actor
- David Baszucki, Roblox co-founder
- Jackson Blake, ice hockey player
- Rachel Bootsma, Olympic gold medalist swimmer
- Carter Bykowski, professional football player
- Blake Cashman, professional football player
- Ryan Connelly, professional football player
- Carter Coughlin, professional football player
- Cole De Vries, professional baseball player
- Jay Foreman, professional football player
- Daerek Hart, Professional esports player
- Jermaine Johnson II, professional football player
- Nick Leddy, professional ice hockey player
- Ken Martin, politician
- Casey Mittelstadt, professional ice hockey player
- Lúcia Moniz, Portuguese actress and singer who represented Portugal in the Eurovision Song Contest 1996; attended Eden Prairie High School as a foreign exchange student
- Susan Rapp, Olympic swimmer
- Robert Rudolph Remus, retired professional wrestler known as Sgt. Slaughter
- Benny Sapp III, professional football player
- Nick Seeler, professional ice hockey player
- Neil Wagner, professional baseball player
- Antoine Winfield Jr., professional football player
- Ryan Wittman, basketball player
- Ethan Wragge, basketball player
