= NaVorro Bowman =

American football player (born 1988)

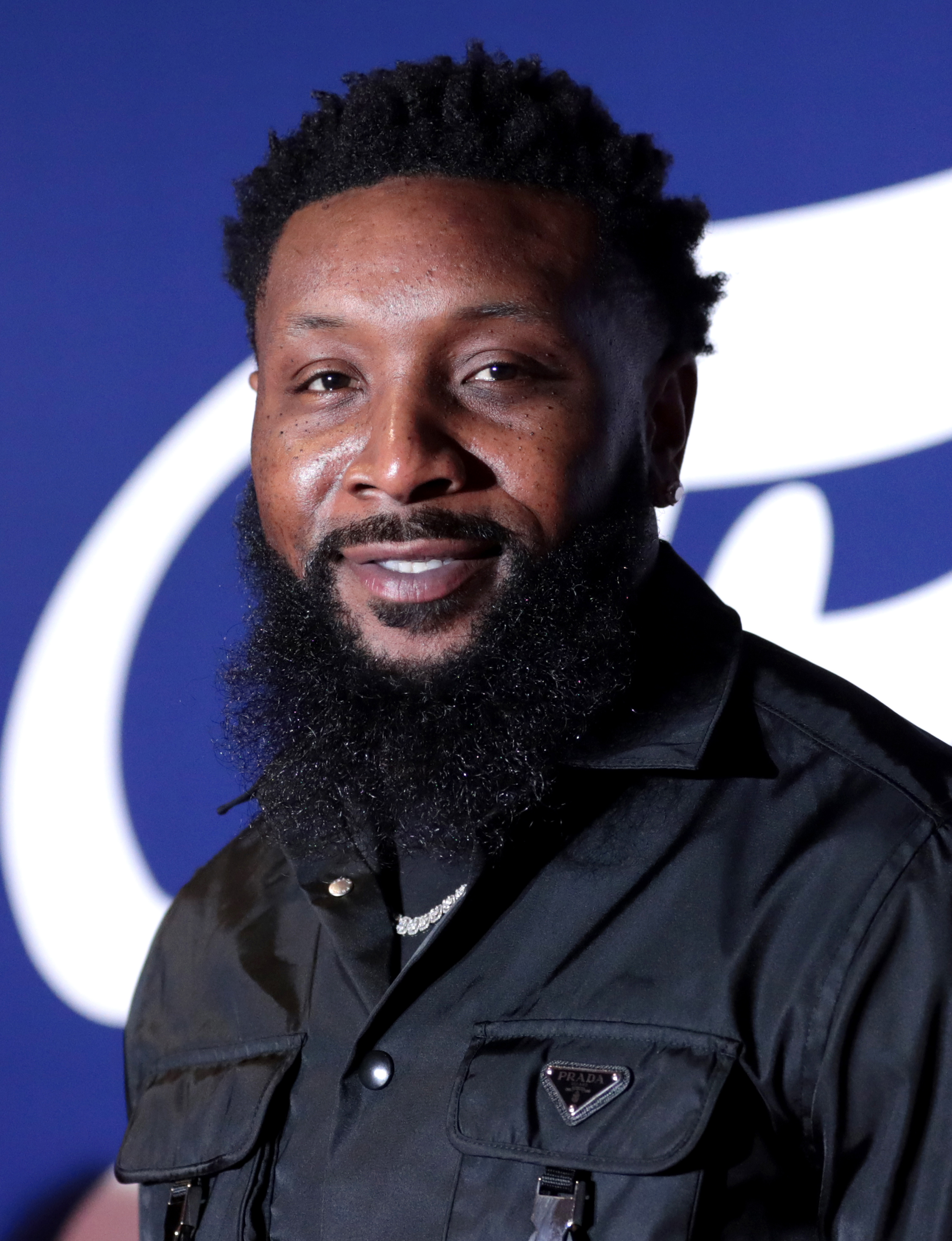
- Bowman in 2023

No. 53
- Position: Linebacker

Personal information
- Born: May 28, 1988 (age 38); District Heights, Maryland, U.S.
- Listed height: 6 ft 0 in (1.83 m)
- Listed weight: 242 lb (110 kg)

Career information
- High school: Suitland (Suitland, Maryland)
- College: Penn State (2006–2009)
- NFL draft: 2010: 3rd round, 91st overall pick

Career history

Playing
- San Francisco 49ers (2010–2017); Oakland Raiders (2017)

Coaching
- Maryland (2023) Defensive analyst; Los Angeles Chargers (2024–2025) Linebackers coach

Awards and highlights
- 4× First-team All-Pro (2011–2013, 2015); 3× Pro Bowl (2012, 2013, 2015); NFL solo tackles leader (2015); NFL combined tackles leader (2015); Butkus Award (pro) (2013); Second-team All-American (2009); 2× First-team All-Big Ten (2008, 2009)

Career NFL statistics
- Total tackles: 798
- Sacks: 14.0
- Forced fumbles: 7
- Fumble recoveries: 6
- Pass deflections: 29
- Interceptions: 5
- Defensive touchdowns: 1
- Stats at Pro Football Reference

NaVorro Roderick Bowman (born May 28, 1988) is an American former professional football player who was a linebacker for eight seasons in the National Football League (NFL). He most recently served as the linebackers coach for the Los Angeles Chargers. Bowman played college football for the Penn State Nittany Lions and was selected by the San Francisco 49ers in the third round of the 2010 NFL draft. He was also a member of the Oakland Raiders.

== Early life ==
Bowman was born in District Heights, Maryland on May 28, 1988. He started sports at a young age and was a member of District Heights boys and girls club, where he played both basketball and football and was invited to many All-star Events. Bowman was a standout player at Suitland High School in Suitland, Maryland. He missed most of his senior season with a shoulder injury, but had a very impressive junior campaign in which he recorded 165 tackles, nine sacks, and three fumble recoveries as a linebacker and ran for 1,200 yards and 22 touchdowns as a running back. Bowman was named the Maryland Defensive Player-of-the-Year, first-team All-State, Washington Post first-team All-Met and first-team All-Conference. He was recruited to Penn State by Larry Johnson, Sr.

== College career ==
Bowman played for the Penn State Nittany Lions football team while attending Pennsylvania State University from 2006 to 2009.

After redshirting the 2006 season, Bowman played in nine games in 2007. He missed two games due to a sprained ankle suffered in a game against Illinois. Bowman finished the season with 16 tackles, a sack, a forced fumble, a fumble recovery, a blocked kick, and a pass deflection.

Bowman saw increased playing time in 2008, largely due to the graduation of All-American linebacker Dan Connor and injury to presumptive starter Sean Lee. Despite the attrition, however, Bowman kept the Nittany Lions ranked in the top ten among three primary defensive categories. Individually, he led the Nittany Lions in total tackles (106), solos (61), and assisted tackles (45), was second in tackles for loss (16.5) and tied for third in sacks (4.0). Bowman also forced two fumbles, recovered a fumble, grabbed an interception and had five pass deflections.

Bowman finished the season with a heavy heart and an outstanding performance. He played against Southern California in the 2009 Rose Bowl the day after his high school coach, Nick Lynch, was killed in an automobile accident in Maryland. Bowman responded by breaking the school's bowl record with five tackles for loss (minus-21 yards), and tying the Rose Bowl record set by Ohio State's Andy Katzenmoyer in the 1997 game. Bowman also recorded his fourth sack of the season among his eight tackles (seven solo) against the Trojans. For his superb efforts against USC, Bowman was selected to ESPN.com's 2008–09 All-Bowl team, one of two Big Ten players named to the squad.

At the end of the season, Bowman was named a first-team All-Big Ten selection.

=== Awards and honors ===
- Maryland Defensive PoY (2005)
- Maryland All-State (2005)
- Washington Post All-Met (2005)
- Big Ten Defensive PoW (September 20, 2008), (November 14, 2009)
- All-Big Ten (2008)

== Professional career ==
=== Pre-draft ===
On January 4, 2010, Bowman's mother announced his decision to forgo his final year of NCAA eligibility and enter the 2010 NFL draft.

Pre-draft measurables
Height	Weight	Arm length	Hand span	40-yard dash	10-yard split	20-yard shuttle	Three-cone drill	Vertical jump	Broad jump	Bench press	Wonderlic
6 ft 0 1/2 in (1.84 m)	242 lb (110 kg)	33 in (0.84 m)	9 7/8 in (0.25 m)	4.77 s	1.65 s	4.59 s	6.91 s	29.5 in (0.75 m)	9 ft 7 in (2.92 m)	26 reps	11
All values from NFL Combine

=== San Francisco 49ers ===
==== 2010 ====
On the second day of the 2010 NFL draft, Bowman was selected in the third round (91st overall) by the San Francisco 49ers. Bowman played in all 16 games in 2010, starting one in place of Patrick Willis, who was ruled out for Week 17 after undergoing a second surgery on his broken right hand. Bowman finished his rookie year with 46 tackles.

==== 2011 ====
In 2011, Bowman became the starter at inside linebacker with the departure of Takeo Spikes in free agency.

Bowman began the season recording a team-high seven tackles during the season-opening 33–17 victory over the Seattle Seahawks. In the next game against the Dallas Cowboys, he had a team-high 11 tackles and a pass deflection during the 27–24 overtime loss. The following week against the Cincinnati Bengals, Bowman recorded a team-high 13 tackles in the 13–8 road victory.

During Week 6 against the Detroit Lions, Bowman recorded a team-high 14 tackles and a pass deflection in the 25–19 road victory. Following a Week 7 bye, the 49ers faced the Cleveland Browns. Bowman finished the 20–10 victory with a team-high 12 tackles and a pass deflection. Two weeks later against the New York Giants, he had a team-high 15 tackles as the 49ers won by a score of 27–20. During a Week 12 16–6 road loss to the Baltimore Ravens on Thanksgiving, Bowman recorded a team-high nine tackles.

During a narrow Week 16 19–17 road victory over the Seahawks, Bowman recorded a team-high 12 tackles, a pass deflection, and his first NFL sack. In the regular-season finale against the St. Louis Rams, Bowman had a team-high 10 tackles, a pass deflection, and a sack during the 34–27 road victory.

Starting in all 16 games and playing alongside All-Pro linebacker Patrick Willis, Bowman made huge strides and finished his second professional season with 143 tackles, two sacks, eight pass deflections, and three fumble recoveries. Bowman also led the 49ers in tackles and his 111 solo tackles ranked second in the NFL. With the emergence in his play, Bowman helped a top-ranked 49ers defense set an NFL single-season record of not allowing a rushing touchdown for 14 games. The previous record was held by the 1920 Decatur Staleys, who did not allow a rushing touchdown in a 13-game season.

The 49ers finished atop the NFC West with a 13–3 record and earned a first-round bye in the playoffs as the #2-seed. In the Divisional Round against the New Orleans Saints, Bowman had 11 tackles during the 36–32 victory. During the NFC Championship Game against the Giants, he recorded 14 tackles and 0.5 sacks in the 20–17 overtime loss. Although Bowman was not voted to the Pro Bowl for his stellar season, he was named to the First-team All-Pro by the Associated Press. Bowman was also voted 85th by his fellow players on NFL Network's Top 100 Players of 2012.

==== 2012 ====
During the season-opener against the Green Bay Packers, Bowman recorded a team-high 11 tackles, two pass deflections, and his first NFL interception off of Aaron Rodgers in the 30–22 road victory. In the next game against the Lions, he had eight tackles and a pass deflection during the 27–19 victory. The following week against the Minnesota Vikings, Bowman had a team-high 18 tackles in the 24–13 road loss.

During a Week 4 34–0 shutout road victory over the New York Jets, Bowman had eight tackles and a pass deflection. In the next game against the Buffalo Bills, he recorded four tackles and a pass deflection during the 45–3 blowout victory. The following week against the Giants, he had a team-high 11 tackles in the 26–3 blowout loss.

During Week 7 against the Seahawks on Thursday Night Football, Bowman recorded seven tackles and his first sack of the season on Russell Wilson in the 13–6 victory. In the next game against the Arizona Cardinals on Monday Night Football, Bowman had a tackle and a sack during the 24–3 road victory. Following a Week 9 bye, the 49ers returned home to face the Rams. Bowman finished the 24–24 tie with a team-high 13 tackles. In the next game against the Chicago Bears on Monday Night Football, he recorded a team-high 13 tackles during the 32–7 victory.

During a Week 14 27–13 victory over the Miami Dolphins, Bowman had a team-high seven tackles. In the next game against the New England Patriots on Sunday Night Football, he recorded a team-high 12 tackles and a forced fumble during the 41–34 road victory. The following week against the Seahawks, Bowman had a team-high 16 tackles in the 42–13 road loss. During the regular season finale against the Cardinals, he recorded five tackles and a pass deflection in the 27–13 victory.

Bowman finished the 2012 season with 148 tackles, two sacks, six pass deflections, a forced fumble, and an interception in 16 games and starts. The 49ers finished atop the NFC West with an 11–4–1 record and earned a first-round bye in the playoffs as the #2-seed. In the Divisional Round against the Packers, he recorded six tackles and two pass deflections during the 45–31 victory. During the NFC Championship Game against Atlanta Falcons, Bowman had four tackles and a pass deflection in the 28–24 comeback road victory as the 49ers advanced to Super Bowl XLVII. In the Super Bowl against the Ravens, he recorded nine tackles, but the 49ers fell behind early and could not come back, losing by a score of 34–31.

==== 2013 ====
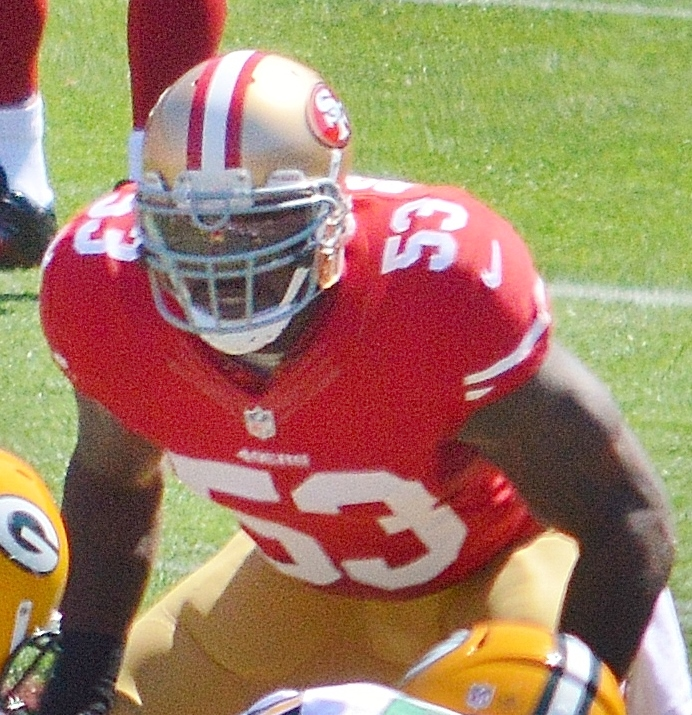
Bowman in 2013

Bowman began the 2013 season recording a team-high eight tackles and a pass deflection during the season-opening 34–28 victory over the Packers. In the next game against the Seahawks, he had a team-high 11 tackles during the 29–3 road loss. The following week against the Indianapolis Colts, Bowman recorded a team-high nine tackles and a pass deflection in the 27–7 loss.

During Week 4 against the Rams on Thursday Night Football, Bowman had six tackles, a pass deflection, and his first two sacks of the season on Sam Bradford, one of which was a strip-sack, in the 35–11 road victory. In the next game against the Houston Texans, Bowman recorded a team-high 13 tackles (tied with Michael Wilhoite) during the 34–3 victory. The following week against the Cardinals, he had six tackles and a fumble recovery in the 32–20 victory.

During a Week 7 31–17 road victory over the Tennessee Titans, Bowman recorded six tackles and a pass deflection. In the next game against the Jacksonville Jaguars in London, he had a team-high 10 tackles and a pass deflection during the 42–10 victory. Following a Week 9 bye, the 49ers returned home to face the Carolina Panthers. Bowman finished the narrow 10–9 loss with a team-high seven tackles.

During Week 11 against the Saints, Bowman had a team-high 15 tackles during the 23–20 road victory. Two weeks later against the Rams, he recorded a team-high 11 tackles and a sack in the 23–13 victory. In the next game against the Seahawks, Bowman had a team-high nine tackles and a sack during the narrow 19–17 victory.

During a Week 15 33–14 road victory over the Tampa Bay Buccaneers, Bowman recorded four tackles and a pass deflection. In the next game against the Falcons on Monday Night Football, he had 11 tackles, a pass deflection, and scored the last touchdown ever at Candlestick Park after intercepting a pass off of Matt Ryan and returned it for an 89-yard touchdown as the 49ers won by a score of 34–24, sending them to the playoffs for the third consecutive season. During the regular-season finale against the Cardinals, Bowman recorded a team-high 10 tackles (tied with Eric Reid), a sack, a forced fumble, a fumble recovery, a pass deflection, and an interception in the 23–20 road victory.

Bowman finished the 2013 season with 145 tackles (which ranked fifth in the league), five sacks, two interceptions, eight pass deflections, six forced fumbles, two fumble recoveries, and a touchdown in 16 games and starts. He earned First-team All-Pro honors for the third time. The 49ers finished second in the NFC West with a 12–4 record and qualified for the playoffs as the #5-seed. During the Wild Card Round against the Packers, Bowman had a team-high 10 tackles and a forced fumble in the 23–20 road victory. In the Divisional Round against the Panthers, he recorded a team-high 11 tackles and a sack during the 23–10 road victory. During the NFC Championship Game against the Seahawks, Bowman had a team-high 14 tackles, a sack, and a forced fumble before leaving the eventual 23–17 road loss in the fourth quarter with a serious knee injury. It was later revealed that he tore both his ACL and MCL.

==== 2014 ====
Bowman's injury caused him to miss the entire 2014 season.

==== 2015 ====
In 2015, Bowman returned from his knee injury that had kept him out for the previous season despite significant concern about his health going into the season. During the season-opening 20–3 victory over the Vikings, Bowman recorded seven tackles and a sack. Two weeks later against the Cardinals, he had a team-high nine tackles in the 47–7 road loss.

During Week 5 against the Giants on Sunday Night Football, Bowman recorded a team-high 16 tackles in the 30–27 road loss. In the next game against the Ravens, he had a team-high 15 tackles during the 25–20 victory. Two weeks later against the Rams, Bowman recorded a team-high 12 tackles in the 27–6 road loss.

During a narrow Week 9 17–16 victory over the Falcons, Bowman had seven tackles, a pass deflection, and a sack. Three weeks later against the Cardinals, he recorded a team-high eight tackles and a pass deflection in the 19–13 loss. In the next game against the Bears, Bowman had a team-high 14 tackles during the 26–20 overtime road victory.

During Week 15 against the Bengals, Bowman recorded a team-high 11 tackles in the 24–14 loss. In the next game against the Lions, he had 10 tackles and 0.5 sacks during the 32–17 road loss. During the regular-season finale against the Rams, Bowman recorded nine tackles and a forced fumble in the 19–16 overtime victory.

Bowman finished the 2015 season with a career-high and league-leading 154 tackles, 2.5 sacks, two pass deflections, and a forced fumble in 16 games and starts. He made his third Pro Bowl appearance and his fourth First-team All-Pro appearance. Bowman was also ranked 61st on the NFL Top 100 Players of 2016.

==== 2016 ====
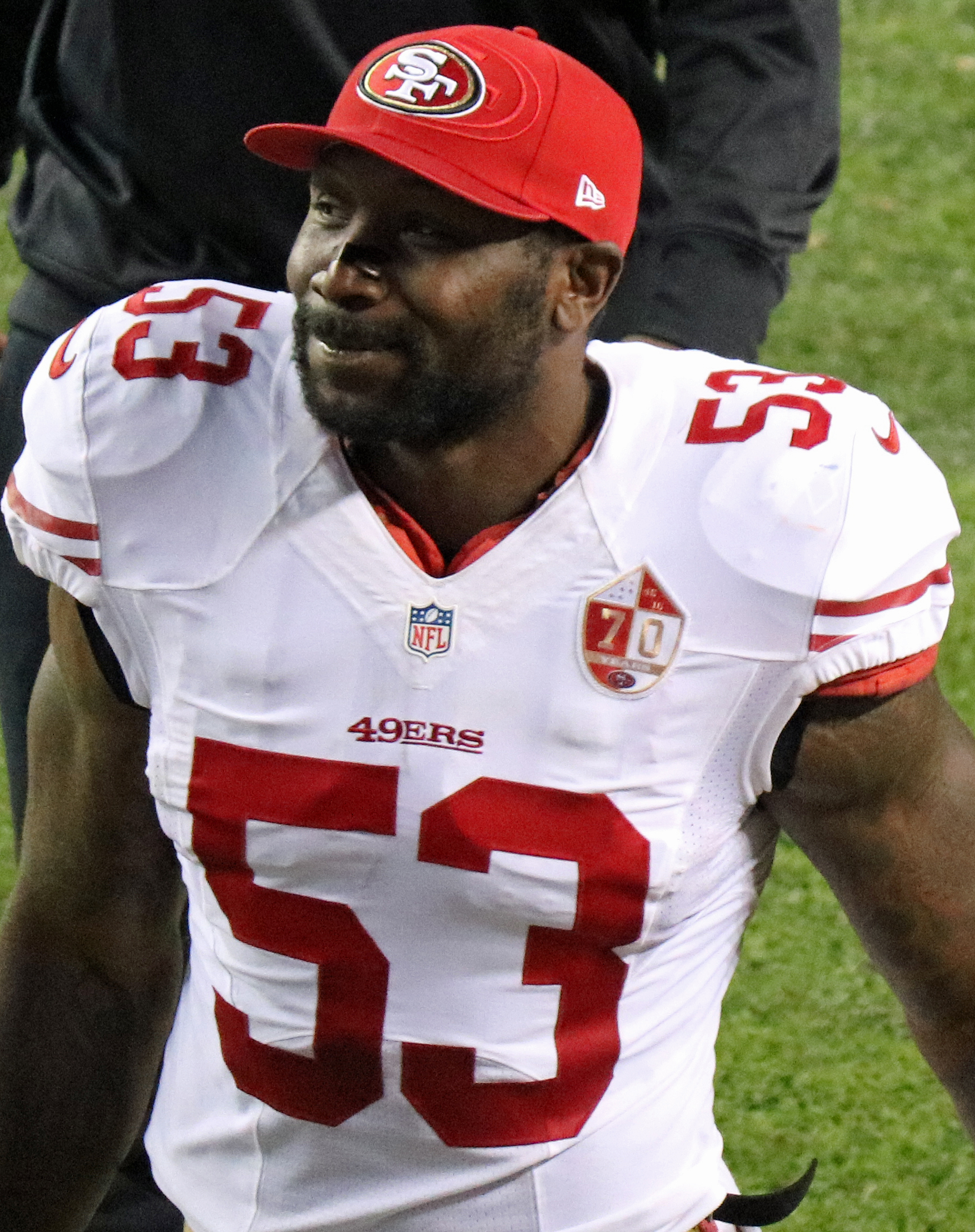
Bowman in 2016

Bowman began the season strong, recording a team-high nine tackles, a pass deflection, and an interception during the season-opening 28–0 shutout victory over the Los Angeles Rams on Monday Night Football. In the next game against the Panthers, he had a team-high 11 tackles and a pass deflection during the 46–27 road loss. The following week against the Seahawks, Bowman recorded seven tackles and a forced fumble in the 37–18 road loss.

During a Week 4 24–17 loss to the Cowboys, Bowman recorded eight tackles and a sack before falling down and gripping the lower back end of his left foot in the third quarter. MRI tests later revealed that Bowman tore his achilles tendon, prematurely ending his season.

==== 2017 ====
During a Week 2 12–9 road loss to the Seahawks, Bowman recorded a team-high 11 tackles. Three weeks later against the Colts, he had a team-high 10 tackles in the 26–23 overtime road loss, but was benched for a few series and later voiced his displeasure with the decision.

On October 13, 2017, Bowman was released from the 49ers at his request after the team was unable to trade him.

NaVorro gave his heart and soul to this team for the last eight years, and for that we are all extremely grateful. During that time, NaVorro was a key component of one of the best teams in the League and his passion for the game allowed him to quickly become a favorite of our Faithful fans. Thursday evening, Kyle and I met with NaVorro, and from our conversation it became evident that going in different directions was best for both him and our team. Although NaVorro may be moving on, he will always be looked at as one of the great players to wear the red and gold. We wish him and his family great success.

— John Lynch

=== Oakland Raiders ===
On October 16, 2017, Bowman signed a one-year, $3 million contract with the Oakland Raiders.

Bowman made his Raiders debut during Week 7 against the Kansas City Chiefs on Thursday Night Football and finished the narrow 31–30 victory with a team-high 11 tackles. In the next game against the Buffalo Bills, Bowman had a team-high 11 tackles during the 34–14 road loss. The following week against the Dolphins on Sunday Night Football, he recorded 10 tackles (tied with Dexter McDonald) in the 27–24 road victory.

During a Week 12 21–14 victory over the Denver Broncos, Bowman recorded seven tackles, a pass deflection, and intercepted a pass from quarterback Paxton Lynch in the end zone, giving the Raiders their first interception of the year after not having one in their first 11 weeks under defensive coordinator Ken Norton Jr. In the next game against the Giants, Bowman had a team-high nine tackles and a fumble recovery in the 24–17 victory. The following week against the Chiefs, he recorded a team-high eight tackles, a pass deflection, and his first sack of the season in the 26–15 road loss.

During Week 15 against the Cowboys on Sunday Night Football, Bowman recorded a team-high nine tackles in the 20–17 loss. In the next game against the Philadelphia Eagles on Christmas Day, he had a team-high seven tackles during the 19–10 road loss. During the regular-season finale against the Los Angeles Chargers, Bowman recorded a team-high 13 tackles and 0.5 sacks in the 30–10 road loss.

In 15 games and starts on the 49ers and Raiders rosters during the 2017 season, Bowman accumulated 127 tackles, three pass deflections, 1.5 sacks, a fumble recovery, and an interception.

=== Retirement ===
On June 4, 2019, Bowman announced his retirement from the NFL after eight seasons and retired symbolically with the 49ers.

== NFL career statistics ==
Legend
	Led the league
**Bold**	Career high

=== Regular season ===
Year	Team	Games		Tackles				Interceptions						Fumbles			
Year	Team	GP	GS	Cmb	Solo	Ast	Sck	PD	Int	Yds	Avg	Lng	TD	FF	FR	Yds	TD
2010	SF	16	1	46	38	8	0.0	0	—	—	—	—	—	0	0	0	0
2011	SF	16	16	143	111	32	2.0	**8**	—	—	—	—	—	0	**3**	0	0
2012	SF	16	16	148	96	**52**	2.0	6	1	11	11.0	11	0	1	0	0	0
2013	SF	16	16	145	**120**	25	**5.0**	**8**	**2**	**93**	**46.5**	**89T**	**1**	**4**	2	0	0
2014	SF	0	0	Did not play due to injury													
2015	SF	16	16	**154**	116	38	2.5	2	—	—	—	—	—	1	0	0	0
2016	SF	4	4	35	24	11	1.0	2	1	0	0.0	0	0	1	0	0	0
2017	SF	5	5	38	22	16	0.0	1	—	—	—	—	—	0	0	0	0
2017	OAK	10	10	89	58	31	1.5	2	1	0	0.0	0	0	0	1	**1**	0
Career		99	84	798	585	213	14.0	29	5	104	20.8	89T	1	7	6	1	0

=== Postseason ===
Year	Team	Games		Tackles				Interceptions						Fumbles			
Year	Team	GP	GS	Cmb	Solo	Ast	Sck	PD	Int	Yds	Avg	Lng	TD	FF	FR	Yds	TD
2011	SF	2	2	25	18	7	0.5	—	—	—	—	—	—	0	0	0	0
2012	SF	3	3	19	14	5	0.0	—	—	—	—	—	—	0	0	0	0
2013	SF	3	3	**35**	**21**	**14**	**2.0**	—	—	—	—	—	—	**2**	0	0	0
Career		8	8	79	53	26	2.5	0	0	0	0.0	0	0	2	0	0	0

== Coaching career ==
On February 14, 2024, Bowman was named as the linebackers coach for the Los Angeles Chargers under new head coach Jim Harbaugh, who was his head coach for four seasons at San Francisco.

On January 15, 2026, Bowman stepped down from the position in order to spend more time with his family.

== "NaVorro Bowman Rule" ==
During the play where Bowman suffered his season-ending injury, Bowman stripped Seahawks' wide receiver Jermaine Kearse of the ball near the goal line, and appeared to take over possession. However, the officials ruled the ball to be in possession of the Seahawks. Under the instant replay conditions at the time, the officials were not permitted to take a second look. On March 26, 2014, team owners approved a change that would allow the referees to review the recovery of a loose ball. A similar proposal to allow coaches to question any recovery using one of their challenges was voted down.

== Personal life ==
Bowman graduated from Penn State with a degree in crime, law, and justice. He speaks frequently by phone with former Nittany Lion linebacker LaVar Arrington. They first met during Arrington's stint with the Washington Redskins, when Bowman was playing at nearby Suitland High School. This friendship, along with their similarity in playing styles, has earned Bowman the nickname "LaVorro".

Bowman's son, NaVorro Jr., is a high school basketball player ranked as a five-star recruit in the class of 2027, and has represented the United States under-17 national team in 2026. He is currently committed to play for the UConn Huskies.
