= 2013 All-Pro Team =

Official list of the best NFL players in 2013

The 2013 All-Pro Teams were named by the Associated Press (AP) the Pro Football Writers of America (PFWA), and the Sporting News (SN) for performance in the 2013 NFL season. While none of the All-Pro teams have the official imprimatur of the NFL (whose official recognition is nomination to the 2014 Pro Bowl (Note: The 2014 Pro Bowl represents the 2013 NFL season)), they are included in the NFL Record and Fact Book. Any player selected to any of the teams can be described as an "All-Pro". The AP team, with first-team and second-team selections, was chosen by a national panel of fifty NFL writers. The Sporting News All-NFL team is voted on by NFL players and executives and was released January 28, 2014. The PFWA team is selected by its more than 300 national members who are accredited media members covering the NFL.

== Teams ==
Offense
Position	First team	Second team
Quarterback	Peyton Manning, Denver (AP, PFWA, SN)	
Halfback	LeSean McCoy, Philadelphia (AP, PFWA, SN); Jamaal Charles, Kansas City (AP, PFWA, SN)	Eddie Lacy, Green Bay (AP-2); Adrian Peterson, Minnesota (AP-2)
Fullback	Mike Tolbert, Carolina (AP)	Marcel Reece, Oakland (AP-2)
Tight end	Jimmy Graham, New Orleans (AP, PFWA, SN)	Vernon Davis, San Francisco (AP-2)
Wide receiver	Calvin Johnson, Detroit (AP, PFWA, SN); Josh Gordon, Cleveland (AP, PFWA, SN)	Demaryius Thomas, Denver (AP-2); A. J. Green, Cincinnati (AP-2t); Antonio Brown, Pittsburgh (AP-2t)
Tackle	Jason Peters, Philadelphia (AP, PFWA, SN); Joe Thomas, Cleveland (AP); Joe Staley, San Francisco (PFWA); Tyron Smith, Dallas (SN)	Tyron Smith, Dallas (AP-2); Joe Staley, San Francisco (AP-2)
Guard	Louis Vasquez, Denver (AP, PFWA); Evan Mathis, Philadelphia (AP, PFWA); Logan Mankins, New England (SN); Marshal Yanda, Baltimore (SN)	Logan Mankins, New England (AP-2); Jahri Evans, New Orleans (AP-2t); Josh Sitton, Green Bay (AP-2t)
Center	Ryan Kalil, Carolina (AP, PFWA); Alex Mack, Cleveland (SN)	Alex Mack, Cleveland (AP-2)

Special teams
Position	First team	Second team
Kicker	Justin Tucker, Baltimore (AP, PFWA-t, SN); Stephen Hauschka, Seattle (PFWA-t)	Matt Prater, Denver (AP-2)
Punter	Johnny Hekker, St. Louis (AP, PFWA); Brandon Fields, Miami (SN)	Brandon Fields, Miami (AP-2)
Return specialist	Cordarrelle Patterson, Minnesota (AP, PFWA-KR, SN-KR); Dexter McCluster, Kansas City (PFWA-PR, SN-PR)	Dexter McCluster, Kansas City (AP-2)
Special teams	Justin Bethel, Arizona (PFWA)	

Defense
Position	First team	Second team
Defensive end	Robert Quinn, St. Louis (AP, PFWA, SN); J. J. Watt, Houston (AP, PFWA, SN)	Greg Hardy, Carolina (AP-2); Mario Williams, Buffalo (AP-2)
Defensive tackle	Ndamukong Suh, Detroit (AP, PFWA); Gerald McCoy, Tampa Bay (AP, PFWA, SN); Kyle Williams, Buffalo (SN)	Muhammad Wilkerson, New York Jets (AP-2); Dontari Poe, Kansas City (AP-2t); Jurrell Casey, Tennessee (AP-2t); Justin Smith, San Francisco (AP-2t)
Outside linebacker	Lavonte David, Tampa Bay (AP, PFWA); Robert Mathis, Indianapolis (AP, PFWA, SN)	Ahmad Brooks, San Francisco (AP-2); Tamba Hali, Kansas City (AP-2)
Inside linebacker	NaVorro Bowman, San Francisco (AP, SN); Luke Kuechly, Carolina (AP, PFWA, SN)	Vontaze Burfict, Cincinnati (AP-2); Karlos Dansby, Arizona (AP-2)
Cornerback	Patrick Peterson, Arizona (AP, PFWA); Richard Sherman, Seattle (AP, PFWA, SN); Joe Haden, Cleveland (SN)	Aqib Talib, New England (AP-2); Joe Haden, Cleveland (AP-2t); Alterraun Verner, Tennessee (AP-2t)
Safety	Eric Berry, Kansas City (AP, PFWA, SN); Earl Thomas, Seattle (AP, PFWA, SN)	Jairus Byrd, Buffalo (AP-2); Antrel Rolle, New York Giants (AP-2t); Devin McCourty, New England (AP-2t); T. J. Ward, Cleveland (AP-2t); Kam Chancellor, Seattle (AP-2t); Eric Weddle, San Diego (AP-2t)

== Key ==
- AP = Associated Press first-team All-Pro
- AP-t = Tied for first-team All-Pro in the AP vote
- AP-2 = Associated Press second-team All-Pro
- AP-2t = Tied for second-team All-Pro in the AP vote
- PFWA = Pro Football Writers Association All-NFL
- SN = Sporting News All-Pro

== Position differences ==
- AP chose no separate punt returner
- AP chose no separate special teams player
- KR = Kick returner
- PR = Punt returner
