= Ahmad Brooks =

American football player (born 1984)

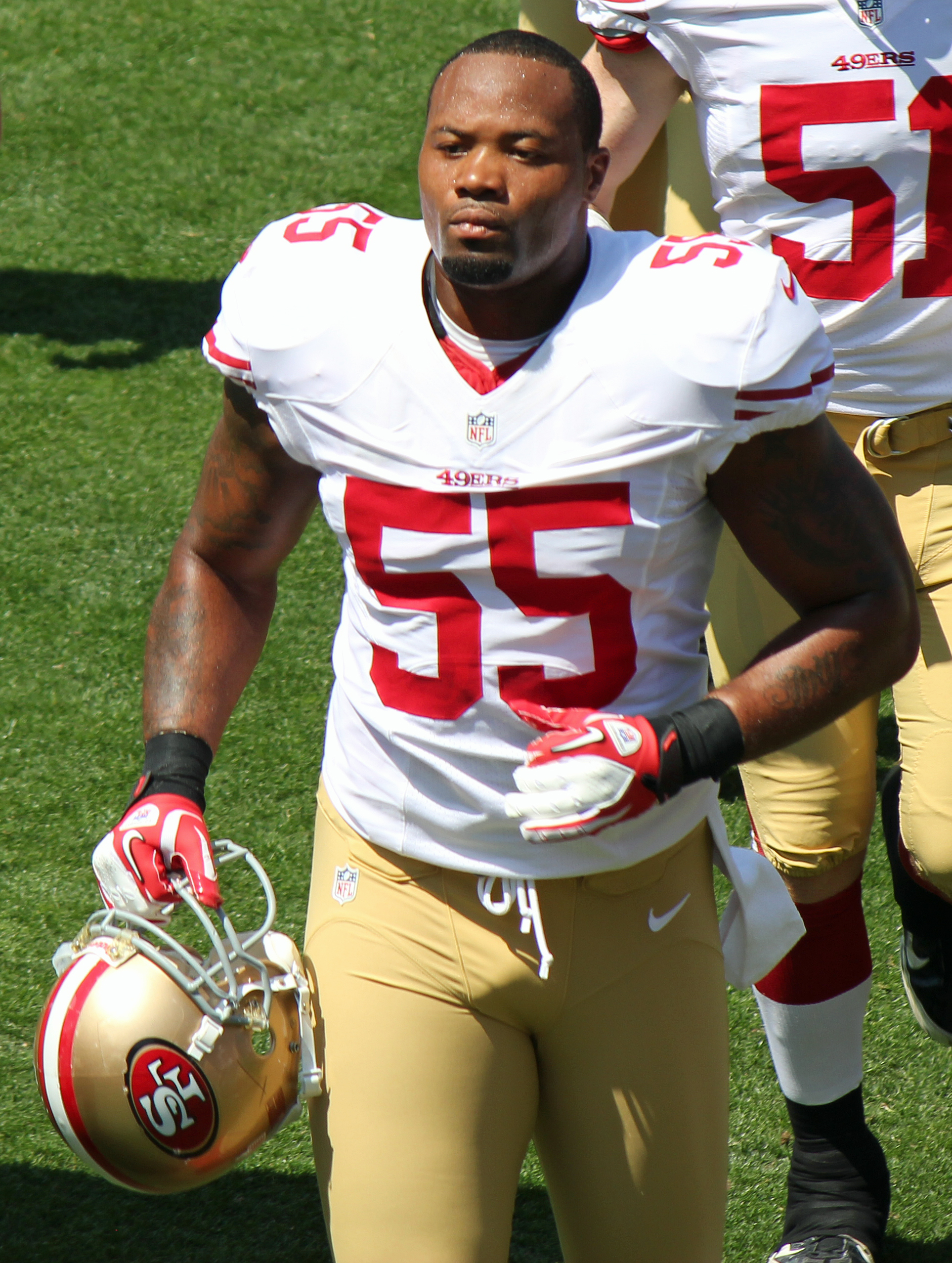
- Brooks with the San Francisco 49ers in 2012

No. 50, 55
- Position: Linebacker

Personal information
- Born: March 14, 1984 (age 42); Fairfax, Virginia, U.S.
- Listed height: 6 ft 3 in (1.91 m)
- Listed weight: 259 lb (117 kg)

Career information
- High school: C.D. Hylton (Woodbridge, Virginia)
- College: Virginia (2003–2005)
- Supplemental draft: 2006: 3rd round

Career history
- Cincinnati Bengals (2006–2007); San Francisco 49ers (2008–2016); Green Bay Packers (2017)

Awards and highlights
- 2× Second-team All-Pro (2012, 2013); Pro Bowl (2013); First-team All-American (2004); First-team All-ACC (2004); ACC Defensive Freshman of the Year (2003)

Career NFL statistics
- Total tackles: 389
- Sacks: 55.0
- Pass deflections: 32
- Interceptions: 3
- Forced fumbles: 12
- Fumble recoveries: 3
- Defensive touchdowns: 1
- Stats at Pro Football Reference

Ahmad Kadar Brooks (born March 14, 1984) is an American former professional football player who was a linebacker in the National Football League (NFL). He played college football at the University of Virginia and was selected by the Cincinnati Bengals in the third round of the 2006 NFL supplemental draft. Brooks also played for the San Francisco 49ers and Green Bay Packers.

== Early life ==
Brooks attended C. D. Hylton High School in Woodbridge, Virginia, where he helped lead two VHSL state championships as a freshman and sophomore. Becoming recognized, Brooks' team was nationally ranked, going 40–0 before losing to Potomac High School of Woodbridge, Virginia, during his junior season in 2000. Brooks injured his ankle during his junior season, which sidelined him that year. His senior season in 2001 was very productive—Brooks had 202 tackles (144 solo), including 34 for loss, and rushed for 848 yards and 10 touchdowns while averaging 12.6 yards per carry. The semifinal loss to Thomas Dale High School of Chester, Virginia, in 2001 was the only loss in which he played. Brooks was named the USA Today national high school defensive player of the year after the 2001 season. He also participated in the 2002 U.S. Army All-American Bowl game.

Considered a five-star recruit by Rivals.com, Brooks was listed as the number-one middle linebacker in the nation in 2002.

== College career ==
Following high school, Brooks spent a semester at Hargrave Military Academy in Chatham, Virginia, a military post-graduate school, before enrolling in the University of Virginia in the winter of 2003. He earned a starting position on the Virginia Cavaliers football team as a freshman and finished the year with a career-high and team-leading 117 tackles. Brooks also had four sacks, six passes defensed, 10 tackles for loss, and 15 quarterback pressures. He had a career-high 12 tackles against Pittsburgh in the Continental Tire Bowl, including a key stop early in the contest to complete a goal-line stand.

During his sophomore year at the University of Virginia, Brooks was one of three Butkus Award finalists, awarded annually to the best college linebacker in the country. He played in 12 games, earning All-American honors after totaling a team-leading 90 tackles with eight sacks, two interceptions, 11 quarterback pressures, and 10 tackles for loss. Brooks earned Atlantic Coast Conference defensive lineman of the week honors for his performance against the Maryland Terrapins. Following his sophomore campaign, Brooks underwent knee surgery.

Brooks missed the first half of his junior year while rehabilitating his knee. Brooks finished the year with 27 tackles (10 solo), a sack, four pass deflections, and five quarterback pressures in only six games. Brooks was dismissed from the Cavalier football team following the 2005 season due to issues off the field.

== Professional career ==
=== Cincinnati Bengals ===
==== 2006 season ====
Brooks entered the NFL supplemental draft following his junior season at Virginia and was selected by the Bengals in the third round on July 13, 2006.

Brooks made his NFL debut in Week 3 against the Pittsburgh Steelers, but recorded no statistics in the 28–20 road victory. In the next game against the New England Patriots, Brooks recorded his first NFL tackle during the 38–13 loss. Following a Week 5 bye, the Bengals went on the road to face the Tampa Bay Buccaneers. Brooks made his first NFL start and finished the narrow 14–13 loss with a team-high 11 tackles (tied with Madieu Williams) and a pass deflection. In the next game against the Carolina Panthers, Brooks recorded five tackles, a pass deflection, and his first NFL sack during the 17–14 victory.

Brooks finished his rookie year with 31 tackles, a sack, and two pass deflections in 11 games and five starts.

==== 2007 season ====
During the season-opening 27–20 victory over the Baltimore Ravens on Monday Night Football, Brooks was the starting middle linebacker and recorded six tackles and a strip-sack. However, in the first series of the next game against the Cleveland Browns, Brooks tore his groin muscle, prematurely ending his season. Brooks was placed on injured reserve on November 7, 2007.

On August 30, 2008, Brooks was waived by the Bengals during final roster cuts.

=== San Francisco 49ers ===
==== 2008 season ====
On August 31, 2008, Brooks was claimed off waivers by the San Francisco 49ers. However, he saw no playing time in 2008.

==== 2009 season ====
Brooks made his 49ers debut in Week 3 against the Minnesota Vikings and finished the 27–24 road loss with two tackles. During a Week 7 24–21 road loss to the Houston Texans, Brooks recorded two tackles and his first sack of the season. Three weeks later against the Chicago Bears on Thursday Night Football, he had a pass deflection in the 10–6 victory.

During a Week 13 20–17 road loss to the Seattle Seahawks, Brooks had five tackles, a forced fumble, and a sack. In the next game against the Arizona Cardinals on Monday Night Football, he recorded four tackles and single-game career-highs of three sacks and two forced fumbles during the 24–9 victory. Two weeks later against the Detroit Lions, Brooks had two tackles, a sack, and two forced fumbles in the 20–6 victory.

Brooks finished the 2009 season with 21 tackles, six sacks, five forced fumbles, and two pass deflections in 14 games and no starts.

==== 2010 season ====
During a Week 2 25–22 loss to the New Orleans Saints on Monday Night Football, Brooks recorded two tackles and his first sack of the season. Three weeks later against the Philadelphia Eagles, he had a pass deflection in the 27–24 loss.

During Week 8 against the Denver Broncos in London, Brooks had three tackles and his second sack of the season in the 24–16 victory. Brooks earned his first start as a 49er in Week 13 against the Green Bay Packers and finished the 34–16 road loss with four tackles and two sacks. In the regular season finale against the Cardinals, Brooks recorded four tackles, a sack, a pass deflection, and his first NFL interception during the 38–7 victory.

Brooks finished the 2010 season with 31 tackles, five sacks, two pass deflections, and an interception in 15 games and one start.

==== 2011 season ====
During the season-opener against the Seahawks, Brooks recorded two tackles and a pass deflection in the 33–17 victory. In the next game against the Dallas Cowboys, he had three tackles and a pass deflection during the 27–24 overtime loss. The following week against his former team, the Cincinnati Bengals, Brooks recorded five tackles and his first sack of the season in the 13–8 road victory.

During Week 4 against the Eagles, Brooks had three tackles and a pass deflection in the narrow 24–23 road victory. Two weeks later against the Lions, Brooks had five tackles and a sack in the 25–19 road victory. Following a Week 7 bye, the 49ers returned home to face the Browns. He finished the 20–10 victory with three tackles and two sacks (one was a strip-sack).

During a Week 9 19–11 road victory over the Washington Redskins, Brooks recorded four tackles and a sack. Two weeks later against the Cardinals, he had three tackles and a sack in the 23–7 victory. During the regular-season finale against the St. Louis Rams, Brooks recorded two tackles and a sack in the 34–27 road victory.

Brooks finished the 2011 season with a then career-high 50 tackles, seven sacks, three pass deflections, and a forced fumble in 16 games and starts. The 49ers finished atop the NFC West with a 13–3 record and earned a first-round bye in the playoffs as the #2-seed. In the Divisional Round against the Saints, he recorded four tackles, a sack, and a pass deflection during the 36–32 victory. During the NFC Championship Game against the New York Giants, Brooks had two tackles in the 20–17 overtime loss.

==== 2012 season ====
On February 28, 2012, Brooks signed a six-year, $44.5 million contract extension with $17.5 million guaranteed.

During the season-opening 30–22 road victory over the Packers, Brooks had two tackles and sacked Aaron Rodgers once. In the next game against the Lions, Brooks recorded a pass deflection during the 27–19 victory. The following week against the Vikings, he had nine tackles and a forced fumble in the 24–13 road loss.

During Week 4 against the New York Jets, Brooks had two tackles and a sack in 34–0 shutout road victory. In the next game against the Buffalo Bills, Brooks recorded two tackles and a sack during the 45–3 blowout victory. Three weeks later against the Cardinals on Monday Night Football, he had two tackles and sacked John Skelton once in the 24–3 road victory.

Following a Week 9 bye, the 49ers returned home to face the Rams. Brooks finished the 24–24 tie with eight tackles, three pass deflections, and a forced fumble. Two weeks later against the Saints, he recorded five tackles, 1.5 sacks, a pass deflection, and his first NFL interception which was returned for a touchdown in the 31–21 road victory. In the next game against the Rams, Brooks had three tackles and a pass deflection during the 16–13 overtime road loss. During the regular-season finale against the Cardinals, he recorded three tackles and a sack in the 27–13 victory.

Brooks finished the 2012 season with 48 tackles, 6.5 sacks, six pass deflections, two forced fumbles, and an interception returned for a touchdown in 16 games and starts. The 49ers finished atop the NFC West with an 11–4–1 record and earned a first-round bye in the playoffs as the #2-seed. In the Divisional Round against the Packers, Brooks had two tackles during the 45–31 victory. During the NFC Championship Game against the Falcons, he recorded two pass deflections in the 28–24 comeback road victory as the 49ers advanced to Super Bowl XLVII. In the Super Bowl against the Baltimore Ravens, Brooks had five tackles and sacked Joe Flacco once, but the 49ers fell behind early and could not come back, losing by a score of 34–31.

==== 2013 season ====
During the season-opener against the Packers, Brooks recorded a tackle and a pass deflection in the 34–28 victory. In the next game against the Seahawks, he had nine tackles and his first sack of the season on Russell Wilson during the 29–3 road loss. Two weeks later against the Rams on Thursday Night Football, Brooks recorded seven tackles, 1.5 sacks, and a pass deflection in the 35–11 road victory.

During a Week 7 31–17 road victory over the Tennessee Titans, Brooks had a tackle, a pass deflection, and a sack. Three weeks later against the Carolina Panthers, he recorded five tackles and sacked Cam Newton twice in the narrow 10–9 loss. In the next game against the Saints, Brooks had two tackles, a strip-sack, a fumble recovery, a pass deflection, and an interception during the 23–20 road loss. On November 20, 2013, he was fined $15,750 by the NFL for a controversial roughing-the-passer penalty in which he struck the neck of quarterback Drew Brees, the same quarterback off whom he scored his first NFL touchdown. The fine was later overturned.

During Week 12 against the Redskins on Monday Night Football, Brooks recorded seven tackles, two sacks, and a pass deflection in the 27–6 road victory. Two weeks later against the Seahawks, he had five tackles and a pass deflection in the narrow 19–17 victory.

Brooks finished the 2013 season setting career-highs in tackles with 60, sacks with 8.5, and pass deflections with seven while also recording two forced fumbles, a fumble recovery, and an interception in 16 games and starts. As a result, Brooks was named to his first Pro Bowl. The 49ers finished second in the NFC West with a 12–4 record and qualified for the playoffs as the #5-seed. During the Wild Card Round against the Packers, Brooks had six tackles and two sacks (one was a strip-sack) in the 23–20 road victory. In the Divisional Round against the Panthers, he recorded six tackles and 2.5 sacks during the 23–10 road victory. During the NFC Championship Game against the Seahawks, Brooks had three tackles in the 23–17 road loss.

==== 2014 season ====
During the season-opener against the Cowboys, Brooks recorded a tackle and his first sack of the season in the 28–17 road victory. During a Week 5 22–17 victory over the Kansas City Chiefs, Brooks had two tackles and a pass deflection. In the next game against the Rams on Monday Night Football, he recorded five tackles and sacked Austin Davis twice during the 31–17 road victory.

During a Week 10 27–24 overtime road victory over the Saints, Brooks had three tackles along with a strip-sack in overtime to help set up the game-winning field goal. Two weeks later against the Redskins, he recorded three tackles, a pass deflection, and a fumble recovery in the 17–13 victory. In the next game against the Seahawks on Thanksgiving, Brooks had four tackles, a pass deflection, and a sack during the 19–3 loss. During Week 15 against the Seahawks, Brooks made his final appearance of the season and finished the 17–7 road loss with three tackles.

Brooks finished the 2014 season with 30 tackles, six sacks, three pass deflections, a forced fumble, and a fumble recovery in 13 games and starts.

==== 2015 season ====
During a Week 4 17–3 loss to the Packers, Brooks recorded five tackles and his first sack of the season. Two weeks later against the Ravens, Brooks had three tackles and a pass deflection in the 25–20 victory. In the next game against the Seahawks on Thursday Night Football, he recorded five tackles and sacked Russell Wilson twice during the 20–3 loss.

During a Week 11 29–13 road loss to the Seahawks, Brooks recorded three tackles and a sack. Three weeks later against the Browns, he had five tackles and recovered a fumble in the 24–10 road loss. In the next game against his former team, the Bengals, Brooks recorded five tackles and a sack during the 24–14 loss. The following week against the Lions, he had three tackles and 1.5 sacks in the 32–17 road loss.

Brooks finished the 2015 season with 42 tackles, 6.5 sacks, a fumble recovery, and a pass deflection in 14 games and starts.

==== 2016 season ====
During the season-opening 28–0 shutout victory over the Los Angeles Rams on Monday Night Football, Brooks had three tackles and his first sack of the season on Case Keenum. In the next game against the Panthers, Brooks recorded three tackles and a pass deflection while also blocking a kick during the 46–27 road loss. The following week against the Seahawks, he recorded four tackles, two pass deflections, and a sack in the 37–18 road loss.

During Week 7 against the Buccaneers, Brooks recorded five tackles and 0.5 sacks in the 34–17 loss. During a Week 11 30–17 loss to the Patriots, he had two tackles and sacked Tom Brady once. In the next game against the Miami Dolphins, Brooks recorded four tackles and 0.5 sacks during the 31–24 road loss. The following week against the Chicago Bears, he had three tackles and a sack in the 26–6 road loss.

During a Week 15 41–13 road loss to the Falcons, Brooks had four tackles and a forced fumble. In the next game against the Rams, he recorded five tackles, a pass deflection, and a sack during the narrow 22–21 road victory.

Brooks finished the 2016 season with 53 tackles, six sacks, four pass deflections, and a forced fumble in 16 games and starts.

On August 25, 2017, Brooks was released by the 49ers.

=== Green Bay Packers ===
On September 3, 2017, Brooks signed a one-year deal with the Green Bay Packers.

Brooks made his Packers debut during the season-opener against the Seahawks and finished the 17–9 victory with one tackle. Two weeks later against his former team, the Bengals, Brooks had two tackles and his first sack of the season on Andy Dalton during the 27–24 overtime victory.

During a Week 10 23–16 road victory over the Bears, Brooks recorded a pass deflection. In the next game against the Ravens, he had three tackles and 0.5 sacks during the 23–0 shutout loss. The following week against the Steelers on Sunday Night Football, Brooks recorded a tackle and a pass deflection in the 31–28 road loss.

Brooks finished the 2017 season with 19 tackles, 1.5 sacks, and two pass deflections in 12 games and five starts.

== NFL career statistics ==
Legend
	Led the league
**Bold**	Career high

=== Regular season ===
Year	Team	Games		Tackles				Interceptions						Fumbles			
Year	Team	GP	GS	Cmb	Solo	Ast	Sck	PD	Int	Yds	Avg	Lng	TD	FF	FR	Yds	TD
2006	CIN	11	5	31	21	10	1.0	2	0	0	0.0	0	0	0	0	0	0
2007	CIN	2	2	6	5	1	1.0	0	0	0	0.0	0	0	1	0	0	0
2008	SF	0	0	DNP													
2009	SF	14	0	21	20	1	6.0	2	0	0	0.0	0	0	**5**	0	0	0
2010	SF	15	1	31	29	2	5.0	2	**1**	32	32.0	32	0	0	0	0	0
2011	SF	**16**	**16**	50	35	**15**	7.0	3	0	0	0.0	0	0	1	0	0	0
2012	SF	**16**	**16**	46	34	12	6.5	6	**1**	**50**	**50.0**	**50T**	**1**	2	0	0	0
2013	SF	**16**	**16**	**60**	**52**	8	**8.5**	**7**	**1**	22	22.0	22	0	1	**1**	0	0
2014	SF	13	13	30	25	5	6.0	3	0	0	0.0	0	0	1	**1**	0	0
2015	SF	14	14	42	28	14	6.5	1	0	0.0	0	0	0	0	**1**	**8**	0
2016	SF	**16**	**16**	53	41	12	6.0	4	0	0	0.0	0	0	1	0	0	0
2017	GB	12	5	19	13	6	1.5	2	0	0	0.0	0	0	0	0	0	0
Career		145	104	389	303	86	55.0	32	3	104	34.7	50T	1	12	3	8	0

=== Postseason ===
Year	Team	Games		Tackles				Interceptions						Fumbles			
Year	Team	GP	GS	Cmb	Solo	Ast	Sck	PD	Int	Yds	Avg	Lng	TD	FF	FR	Yds	TD
2011	SF	2	2	6	4	2	1.0	1	0	0	0.0	0	0	0	0	0	0
2012	SF	**3**	**3**	7	7	0	1.0	**2**	0	0	0.0	0	0	0	0	0	0
2013	SF	**3**	**3**	**15**	**11**	**4**	**4.5**	0	0	0	0.0	0	0	**1**	0	0	0
Career		8	8	28	22	6	6.5	3	0	0	0.0	0	0	1	0	0	0

== Personal life ==
Brooks' father, former Washington Redskins defensive tackle Perry Brooks, died in March 2010.
