= Carter Bykowski =

American football player (born 1990)

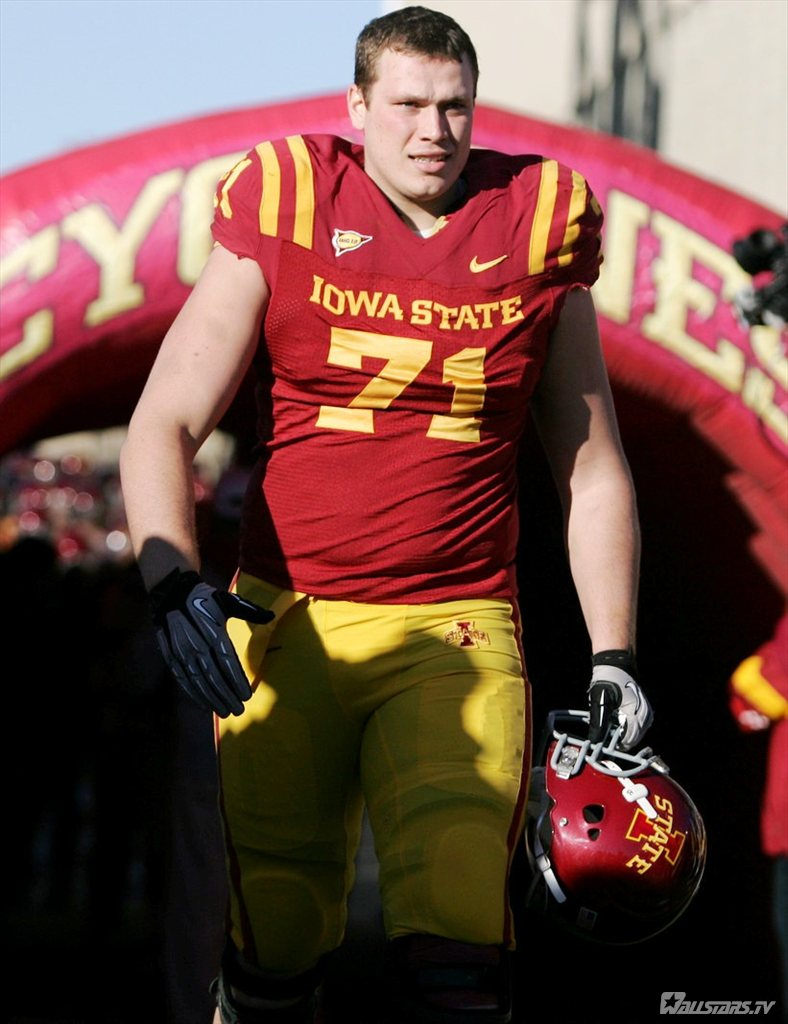
- Bykowski at Iowa State in 2012

No. 60, 61, 71
- Position: Offensive tackle

Personal information
- Born: July 25, 1990 (age 36); Eden Prairie, Minnesota, U.S.
- Listed height: 6 ft 7 in (2.01 m)
- Listed weight: 313 lb (142 kg)

Career information
- High school: Eden Prairie (MN)
- College: Iowa State (2008–2012)
- NFL draft: 2013: 7th round, 246th overall pick

Career history
- San Francisco 49ers (2013–2014)*; Minnesota Vikings (2014–2016); Atlanta Falcons (2016–2017)*
- * Offseason or practice squad member only
- Stats at Pro Football Reference

Carter Bykowski (born July 25, 1990) is an American former professional football offensive tackle in the National Football League (NFL). He was selected by the San Francisco 49ers in the seventh round, 246th overall, of the 2013 NFL draft. He played college football for the Iowa State Cyclones.

== Early life ==
Bykowski attended Eden Prairie High School in Eden Prairie, Minnesota, where he was coached by Mike Grant, son of former Minnesota Vikings head coach Bud Grant. He had four catches for 43 yards during his junior season. As a senior, he caught 11 passes for 194 yards and nine touchdowns, helping Eden Prairie win back-to-back Minnesota 5A championships and set Minnesota state championship game records for total yards gained (520), first downs (30), and rushing first downs (22). His squad was 16th-best prep football team according to USA Today Super 25 rankings. In basketball, Bykowski served as team captain as a senior.

Bykowski was the 10th-rated prospect in the state of Minnesota according to Rivals.com, while Scout.com rated him as the 69th tight end nationally.

== College career ==
Signing with Iowa State University in 2008, Bykowski played in three games as a true freshman tight end. The next season, he redshirted while transitioning to offensive tackle. He would further appear in 44 games and make 18 starts at ISU, including starting at left tackle every game of the 2012 season, where he was Honorable Mention All-Big 12. Bykowski majored in management, and was a three-time academic All-Big 12 honoree. After exhausting his eligibility, Bykowski began preparations for the NFL draft.

== Professional career ==
Pre-draft measurables
Height	Weight	40-yard dash	10-yard split	20-yard split	20-yard shuttle	Three-cone drill	Vertical jump	Broad jump	Bench press
6 ft 7 in (2.01 m)	306 lb (139 kg)	5.30 s	1.87 s	3.05 s	4.72 s	7.84 s	28.5 in (0.72 m)	8 ft 10 in (2.69 m)	25 reps
All values from Pro Day

=== San Francisco 49ers ===
Bykowski was selected in the seventh round, (246th overall), by the San Francisco 49ers in the 2013 NFL draft. After spending his rookie season on the practice squad, he signed to a new contract on January 21, 2014.

=== Minnesota Vikings ===
The Minnesota Vikings signed Bykowski off the 49ers' practice squad on December 10, 2014. On September 3, 2016, he was released by the Vikings as part of final roster cuts. On September 6, 2016, he was signed to the Vikings' practice squad. On September 13, he was released from the Vikings' practice squad.

=== Atlanta Falcons ===
On September 21, 2016, Bykowski was signed to the Falcons' practice squad. He signed a reserve/future contract with the Falcons on February 7, 2017.

On March 30, 2017, Bykowski retired from the NFL when the Falcons placed him on the team's reserve/retired list. He was waived from the list on July 26, 2020.
