= Mohamed Sanu =

American football player (born 1989)

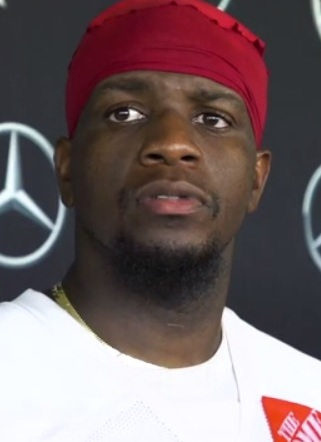
- Sanu with the Atlanta Falcons in 2018

No. 12, 14, 18, 6
- Position: Wide receiver

Personal information
- Born: August 22, 1989 (age 37); New Brunswick, New Jersey, U.S.
- Listed height: 6 ft 2 in (1.88 m)
- Listed weight: 210 lb (95 kg)

Career information
- High school: South Brunswick (Monmouth Junction, New Jersey)
- College: Rutgers (2009–2011)
- NFL draft: 2012: 3rd round, 83rd overall pick

Career history
- Cincinnati Bengals (2012–2015); Atlanta Falcons (2016–2019); New England Patriots (2019); San Francisco 49ers (2020); Detroit Lions (2020); San Francisco 49ers (2021); Miami Dolphins (2022)*
- * Offseason or practice squad member only

Awards and highlights
- First-team All-Big East (2011)

Career NFL statistics
- Receptions: 435
- Receiving yards: 4,871
- Receiving touchdowns: 27
- Rushing yards: 226
- Rushing touchdowns: 2
- Passing yards: 233
- Passing touchdowns: 4
- Stats at Pro Football Reference

Mohamed Sanu Sr. (born August 22, 1989) is an American former professional football player who was a wide receiver for 10 seasons in the National Football League (NFL). He played college football for the Rutgers Scarlet Knights and was selected by the Cincinnati Bengals in the third round of the 2012 NFL draft. Sanu was also a member of the Atlanta Falcons, New England Patriots, Detroit Lions, San Francisco 49ers, and the Miami Dolphins.

== Early life ==
Originally from Sayreville, New Jersey, Sanu was born to a Muslim family and also lived in his parents' native Sierra Leone as a child. Sanu returned to the United States and lived in Dayton, New Jersey, where he eventually starred at South Brunswick High School as a triple option quarterback before enrolling at Rutgers University in 2009. In his final season at South Brunswick High School, Sanu led the Vikings to their first playoff berth in nearly 40 years, including three rushing touchdowns of at least 80 yards against Edison High School.

He was ruled ineligible to play during his senior year, due to exceeding NJSIAA's age restriction; he graduated from high school six months early and enrolled at Rutgers University in January 2009. In track & field, Sanu was one of the state's top performers in the jumping events. At the 2008 NJSIAA Sectional Championships, he placed 2nd in the triple jump (14.08 m) and 3rd in the long jump (6.43 meters). He also competed as a sprinter, recording personal-best times of 6.94 seconds in the 55 metres and 24.28 seconds in the 200 meters at the 2008 Merli Invitational. He is a fan of soccer, and supports West Ham United.

== College career ==
As a true freshman wide receiver Sanu had 51 receptions for 639 yards and three touchdowns; he also ran 62 times for 346 yards and five touchdowns out of the Wildcat formation. Sanu was the first-ever true freshman to start at wide receiver for Rutgers under coach Greg Schiano, and won Most Valuable Player honors at the 2009 St. Petersburg Bowl. In 2010, Sanu was a consensus preseason All-Big East wide receiver. In 2011 he tied a Big East record with 13 receptions against North Carolina. The next week, he broke his own record by catching 16 passes. In 2011, Sanu broke the Big East single-season reception record with 115 receptions for 1,206 yards, a record previously held by Pitt's Larry Fitzgerald.

In his three seasons at Rutgers, Sanu caught 210 passes for 2,263 yards and 19 touchdowns, and gained 3,019 all-purpose yards. He also completed eight of 18 passes for 207 yards and four touchdowns, recorded an interception and punted twice for 67 yards.

== Professional career ==
Pre-draft measurables
Height	Weight	Arm length	Hand span	40-yard dash	10-yard split	20-yard split	20-yard shuttle	Three-cone drill	Vertical jump	Broad jump	Bench press
6 ft 1 1/2 in (1.87 m)	211 lb (96 kg)	33 1/2 in (0.85 m)	10 1/8 in (0.26 m)	4.67 s	1.59 s	2.62 s	4.22 s	6.88 s	36 in (0.91 m)	10 ft 6 in (3.20 m)	19 reps
All values from NFL Combine

=== Cincinnati Bengals ===
==== 2012 season ====
The Cincinnati Bengals selected Sanu in the third round (83rd overall) of the 2012 NFL draft, the 12th wide receiver taken that year. He signed a four-year, $2.71 million contract with them that included a signing bonus of $563,252.

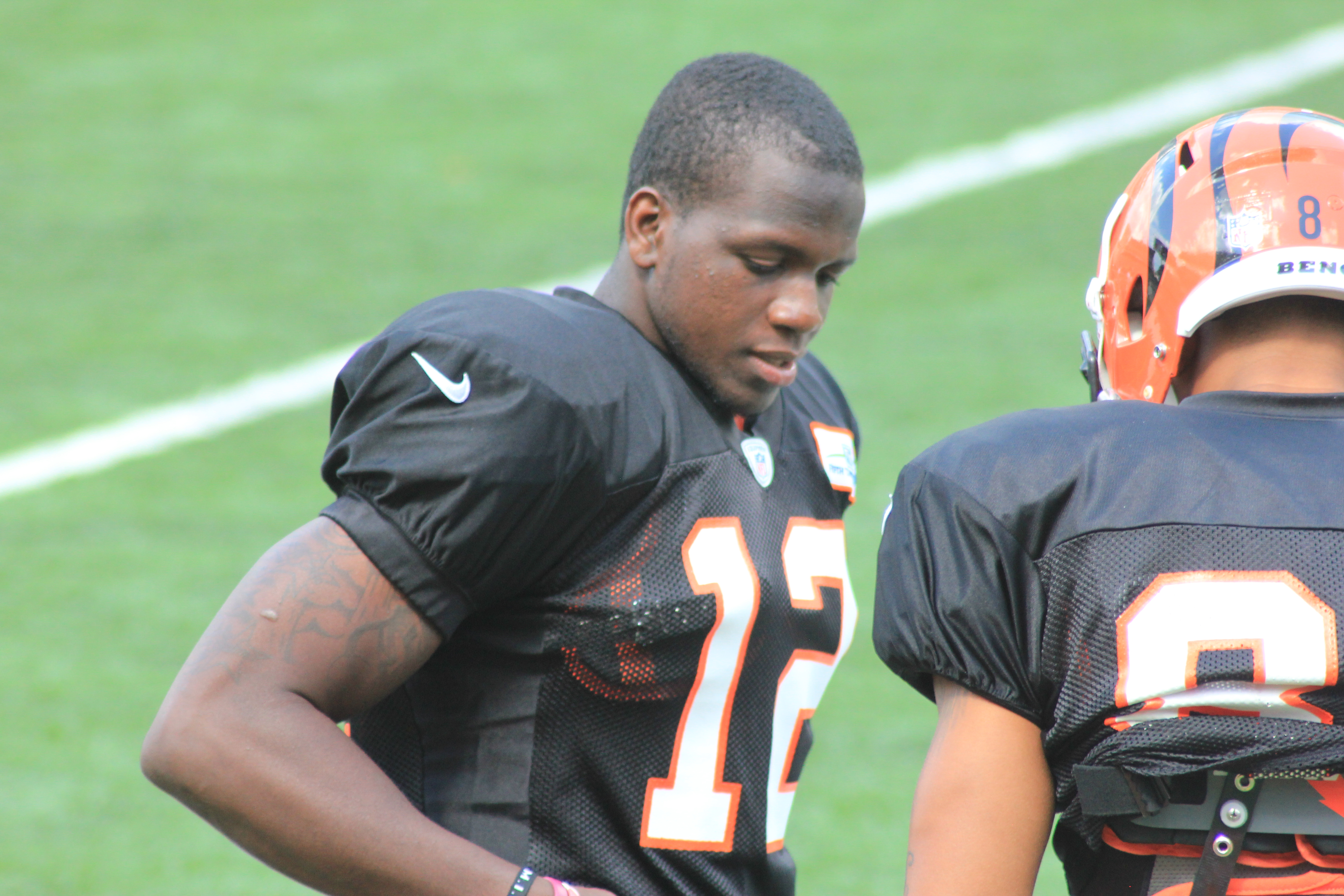
Sanu with the Bengals in 2012

On September 23, 2012, against the Washington Redskins, Sanu came in as the wildcat quarterback out of a shotgun formation for the Bengals on the first play from scrimmage of the game and threw a 73-yard touchdown pass to A. J. Green. This not only made him the first Bengals wide receiver ever to throw a touchdown pass, but it also gave him a touchdown pass before his first NFL reception.

Sanu had his first touchdown catch during Week 10 against the New York Giants. He finished the game with four receptions for 47 yards. During Week 12 against the Oakland Raiders, Sanu had five receptions for 29 yards and two touchdowns in the 34–10 victory for his first NFL game with multiple touchdowns. On November 30, 2012, it was announced that Sanu had season-ending surgery to repair a stress fracture.

==== 2013 season ====
Sanu played in all 16 games of the 2013 NFL season, finishing with 47 receptions for 455 yards and two touchdowns.

The Bengals finished atop the AFC North with an 11–5 record. In the Wild Card Round against the San Diego Chargers, his playoff debut, Sanu had a 13-yard reception in a 27–10 loss.

==== 2014 season ====
In the 2014 season, Sanu played a much bigger role in the Bengals offense due to injuries to receivers A. J. Green and Marvin Jones. Sanu recorded two 100-yard games in 2014. During Week 2, he recorded a career-long 76-yard touchdown reception from quarterback Andy Dalton in the 24–10 victory over the Atlanta Falcons. In the next game against the Tennessee Titans, Sanu threw an 18-yard touchdown pass to Dalton in the 33–7 victory.

It was Sanu's fourth completion of his career on four passing attempts and the second touchdown pass of his career. In Week 6 he had a career-high 10 receptions against the Carolina Panthers, for 120 yards and a touchdown in a 37–37 tie. During Week 8 against the Baltimore Ravens, he had five receptions for a career-high 125 yards in the 27–24 victory.

The Bengals returned to the playoffs with a 10–5–1 record. In the Wild Card Round against the Indianapolis Colts, he had three receptions for 31 receiving yards on seven targets in the 26–10 loss.

==== 2015 season ====
In the 2015 season, Sanu had 33 receptions for 394 yards. In Week 9 he scored his first NFL rushing touchdown on a 25-yard reverse against the Cleveland Browns. The Bengals finished with a 12–4 record and finished atop the AFC North. In the Wild Card Round against the Pittsburgh Steelers, he had three receptions for 17 receiving yards in the 18–16 loss.

=== Atlanta Falcons ===
==== 2016 season ====
On March 10, 2016, Sanu signed a five-year, $32.5 million contract with the Atlanta Falcons.

In his Falcons debut against the Tampa Bay Buccaneers, Sanu had five receptions for 80 yards, a touchdown, and a two-point conversion in the 31–24 loss. He finished the regular season with 59 receptions for 653 yards and four touchdowns.

The Falcons finished atop the NFC South and reached the playoffs with an 11–5 record. In the Divisional Round against the Seattle Seahawks he had four receptions for 44 yards and a touchdown in the 36–20 victory. In the NFC Championship against the Green Bay Packers he finished with five receptions for 52 yards and a touchdown in the final NFL Game in the Georgia Dome. The Falcons reached Super Bowl LI, playing against the New England Patriots. Sanu had two receptions for 25 yards in the 34–28 overtime defeat.

==== 2017 season ====
During Week 2, Sanu had a season-high 85 receiving yards in a 34–23 victory over the Green Bay Packers. During Week 12, Sanu threw a 51-yard touchdown pass to wide receiver Julio Jones in a 34–20 win over the Tampa Bay Buccaneers. Sanu finished the 2017 season with 67 receptions for 703 yards and five touchdowns. The Falcons posted a 10–6 record and qualified for the playoffs. In the Wild Card Round against the Los Angeles Rams he had four receptions for 75 yards in a 26–13 victory. In the Divisional Round, he had three receptions for 50 yards in a 15–10 loss to the eventual Super Bowl LII champion Philadelphia Eagles.

==== 2018 season ====
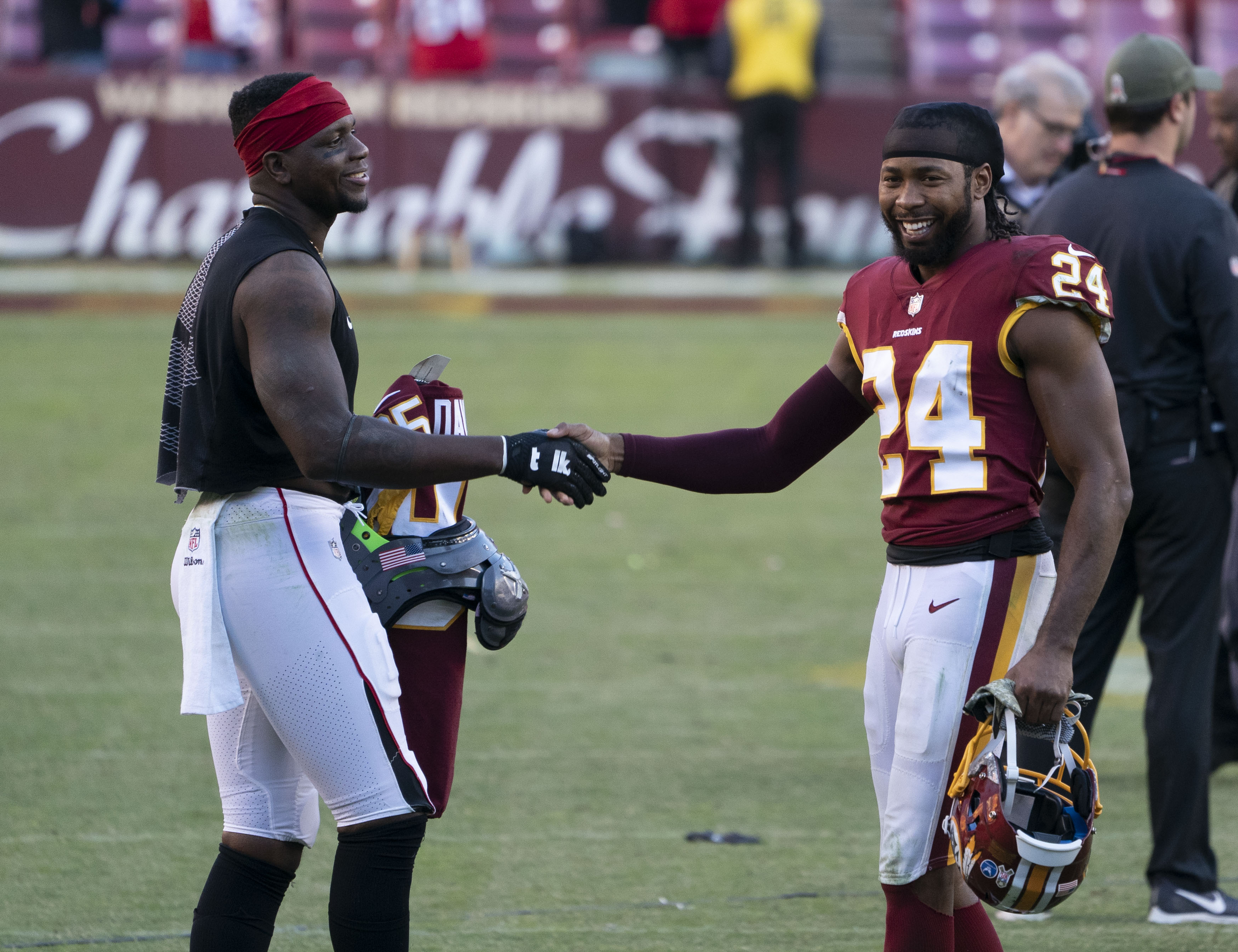
Sanu and Josh Norman in a game against the Washington Redskins in 2018

After a relatively slow start to the 2018 season, Sanu had six receptions for 111 yards in a narrow Week 4 37–36 loss to the Cincinnati Bengals. During the regular-season finale, Sanu threw a five-yard touchdown pass to quarterback Matt Ryan in a 34–32 road victory over the Tampa Bay Buccaneers, the fourth of Sanu's career.

Sanu finished the 2018 season with a 66 receptions for a career-high 838 yards and four touchdowns.

==== 2019 season ====
During a Week 4 24–10 loss to the Tennessee Titans, Sanu had nine receptions for a season-high 91 yards. In the next game against the Houston Texans, Sanu had five receptions for 42 yards and a touchdown in the 53–32 road loss.

Sanu had 33 receptions, 313 receiving yards, and a touchdown with the Falcons before being traded to the New England Patriots.

=== New England Patriots ===
On October 22, 2019, Sanu was traded to the New England Patriots in exchange for a second-round pick in the 2020 NFL draft.

In his Patriots debut, against the Cleveland Browns, Sanu had two receptions on two targets for 23 yards. In Week 9 against the Baltimore Ravens, Sanu had a season-high 10 receptions for 81 yards and a touchdown in the 37–20 loss. In the wild-card round against the Titans, he had an 11-yard reception in the 20–13 loss. Sanu had 26 receptions, 207 receiving yards, and a touchdown in his first season with the Patriots.

Sanu was placed on the active/physically unable to perform list at the start of training camp on August 2, 2020, and was activated from the list two days later. On September 3, Sanu was released by the Patriots.

=== San Francisco 49ers (first stint) ===
On September 18, 2020, Sanu signed with the San Francisco 49ers. He was released by San Francisco on October 6.

=== Detroit Lions ===
On November 6, 2020, Sanu was signed to the Detroit Lions practice squad. He was elevated to the active roster on November 21 for the team's Week 11 game against the Carolina Panthers, and reverted to the practice squad after the game. Sanu was promoted to the active roster on November 25. He finished the 2020 season with 17 receptions for 187 yards and one touchdown, which came in Week 12 against the Houston Texans.

=== San Francisco 49ers (second stint) ===
On March 30, 2021, Sanu re-signed with the 49ers. He played in eight games before being placed on injured reserve on November 15. Sanu was activated on January 26, 2022. He finished the 2021 season with 15 receptions for 177 yards in eight games.

=== Miami Dolphins ===
On July 26, 2022, Sanu signed with the Miami Dolphins. He was released by the Dolphins on August 29.

On September 19, 2025, Sanu announced his official retirement from the NFL after three years of free agency.

== Career statistics ==
=== NFL ===
Year	Team	Games		Receiving					Rushing					Passing							Fumbles	
Year	Team	GP	GS	Rec	Yds	Avg	Lng	TD	Att	Yds	Avg	Lng	TD	Cmp	Att	Pct	Yds	TD	Int	Rtg	Fum	Lost
2012	CIN	9	3	16	154	9.6	34	4	5	15	3.0	7	0	1	1	100.0	73	1	0	158.3	0	0
2013	CIN	16	14	47	455	9.7	32	3	4	16	4.0	9	0	1	1	100.0	25	0	0	118.7	1	1
2014	CIN	16	13	56	790	14.1	76	5	7	51	7.3	26	0	3	3	100.0	79	1	0	158.3	0	0
2015	CIN	16	4	33	394	11.9	52	0	10	71	7.1	25	2	—	—	—	—	—	—	—	2	0
2016	ATL	15	15	59	653	11.1	59	4	1	5	5.0	5	0	—	—	—	—	—	—	—	1	1
2017	ATL	15	15	67	703	10.5	25	5	4	10	2.5	4	0	1	1	100.0	51	1	0	158.3	0	0
2018	ATL	16	16	66	838	12.7	44	4	7	44	6.3	24	0	1	2	50.0	5	1	0	95.8	2	1
2019	ATL	7	6	33	313	9.5	28	1	2	3	1.5	2	0	—	—	—	—	—	—	—	0	0
2019	NE	8	6	26	207	8.0	19	1	1	8	8.0	8	0	—	—	—	—	—	—	—	0	0
2020	SF	3	0	1	9	9.0	9	0	—	—	—	—	—	—	—	—	—	—	—	—	0	0
2020	DET	7	4	16	178	11.1	21	1	1	3	3.0	3	0	—	—	—	—	—	—	—	0	0
2021	SF	8	0	15	177	11.8	21	0	—	—	—	—	—	—	—	—	—	—	—	—	0	0
Total		136	96	435	4,871	11.2	76	27	42	226	5.4	26	2	7	8	87.5	233	4	0	158.3	6	3

=== College ===
Season	Team	GP	Receiving				Rushing				Scrimmage			
Season	Team	GP	Rec	Yds	Avg	TD	Att	Yds	Avg	TD	Tch	Yds	Avg	TD
2009	Rutgers	13	51	639	12.5	3	62	346	5.6	5	113	985	8.7	8
2010	Rutgers	12	44	418	9.5	2	59	309	5.2	4	103	727	7.1	6
2011	Rutgers	13	115	1,206	10.5	7	4	−2	−0.5	0	119	1,204	10.1	7
Total		38	210	2,263	10.8	12	125	653	5.2	9	335	2,916	8.7	21

== Personal life ==
In 2014, Sanu partnered a venture with Fantex, Inc., in which Fantex offered an IPO of tracking stock based upon Sanu's future earnings in return for giving Fantex a 10% share of future earnings from his brand. The offering was completed in November 2014, in which 164,300 shares were sold at $10 per share.

Sanu is a practicing Muslim.
