= Fantex =

U.S.-based financial services company

Fantex Holdings, Inc.
- Type: Corporation
- Industry: Securities Issuer, Online Brokerage
- Founded: 2012
- Headquarters: San Francisco, California, United States
- Number of employees: 0-50
- Website: www.fantex.com

Fantex Holdings, Inc. was a U.S.-based financial services and brand development company headquartered in San Francisco, California which provides an investment service allowing investors to trade securities tied to the cash flows of professional athletes and their brand contracts with Fantex. Since their first initial public offering of shares linked to future earnings of San Francisco 49ers Pro Bowl tight end Vernon Davis in October 2013, Fantex has continued to initiate brand contracts and list more athletes on their exchange. The Fantex asset class has been compared to investments similar to the celebrity bonds offered by professional entertainers, including the 1997 offering by David Bowie.

Fantex is a holding company with two primary businesses:

1. Fantex, Inc. – a securities issuer that files registration statements with the Securities and Exchange Commission.
2. Fantex Brokerage Services, LLC – an online brokerage firm and Financial Industry Regulatory Authority (FINRA) member.

== History ==
Fantex was founded in 2012 by David Beirne, former general partner of Benchmark Capital, Buck French, and Dave Mullin. The company's board of directors include John Elway (member of the Pro Football Hall of Fame and GM of the Denver Broncos), Josh Levine (former CTO/COO of E-Trade), and Duncan Niederauer (former Chief Executive Officer of the New York Stock Exchange). Fantex's board of advisors consists of business executives and former professional athletes, including Jack Nicklaus.

Fantex was launched in the fall of 2013, when the company filed its first IPO with the Securities and Exchange Commission. Fantex's first offering was announced to be running back Arian Foster of the Houston Texans, but it was postponed due to injury. In April 2014, Fantex proceeded with tight end Vernon Davis of the San Francisco 49ers as its first successful IPO. Over the next 18 months, the company brought five more football player stocks to market. In September 2015, Fantex signed a contract with its first non-football athlete, Los Angeles Angels pitcher Andrew Heaney. In January 2016, the company signed a deal with its first golfer, Scott Langley. Fantex has signed contracts with eleven athletes and has completed six IPOs worth a total of $25.8 million.

In August 2016, the company closed its platform to individual investors, and in March 2017 the company's CEO and co-founder, Cornell French, left Fantex.

== Timeline ==
| Date | Athlete | Event | Brand Acquired | Value |
|---|---|---|---|---|
| October 2013 | Vernon Davis | Signs Fantex brand contract. | 10% | $4,200,000 |
| February 2014 | EJ Manuel | Signs Fantex brand contract. | 10% | $5,200,000 |
| April 2014 | Vernon Davis | Completes $4.2 million initial public offering | | |
| May 2014 | Mohamed Sanu | Signs Fantex brand contract. | 10% | $1,640,000 |
| July 2014 | EJ Manuel | Completes $5.2 million initial public offering (IPO). | | |
| September 2014 | Alshon Jeffery | Signs Fantex brand contract. | 13% | $8,400,000 |
| November 2014 | Mohamed Sanu | Completes $1.6 million initial public offering (IPO). | | |
| February 2015 | Michael Brockers | Signs Fantex brand contract. | 10% | $3,600,000 |
| March 2015 | Alshon Jeffery | Completes $8.4 million initial public offering (IPO). | | |
| March 2015 | Jack Mewhort | Signs Fantex brand Contract. | 10% | $2,700,000 |
| March 2015 | Kendall Wright | Signs Fantex brand contract. | | |
| May 2015 | Michael Brockers | Completes $3.6 million initial public offering (IPO). | | |
| July 2015 | Jack Mewhort | Completes $2.7 million initial public offering (IPO). | | |
| September 2015 | Andrew Heaney | Signs Fantex brand contract. | 10% | $3,340,000 |
| September 2015 | Terrance Williams | Signs Fantex brand contract. | 10% | $3,060,000 |
| September 2015 | Ryan Shazier | Signs Fantex brand contract. | 10% | $3,110,000 |
| April 2016 | Allen Robinson | Signs Fantex brand contract. | 12% | $4,600,000 |
| April 2016 | Tyler Duffey | Signs Fantex brand contract. | 10% | $2,230,000 |
| April 2016 | Maikel Franco | Signs Fantex brand contract. | 10% | $4,350,000 |
| April 2016 | Collin McHugh | Signs Fantex brand contract. | 10% | $3,960,000 |
| April 2016 | Jonathan Schoop | Signs Fantex brand contract. | 10% | $4,910,000 |
| April 2016 | Yangervis Solarte | Signs Fantex brand contract. | 11% | $3,150,000 |
| April 2016 | Kelly Kraft | Signs Fantex brand contract. | 15% | $2,280,000 |
| April 2016 | Scott Langley | Signs Fantex brand contract. | 15% | $3,060,000 |
| April 2016 | Jack Maguire | Signs Fantex brand contract. | 11% | $2,070,000 |
| April 2016 | Kyle Reifers | Signs Fantex brand contract. | 15% | $1,740,000 |
