= Vernon Davis =

American football player (born 1984)

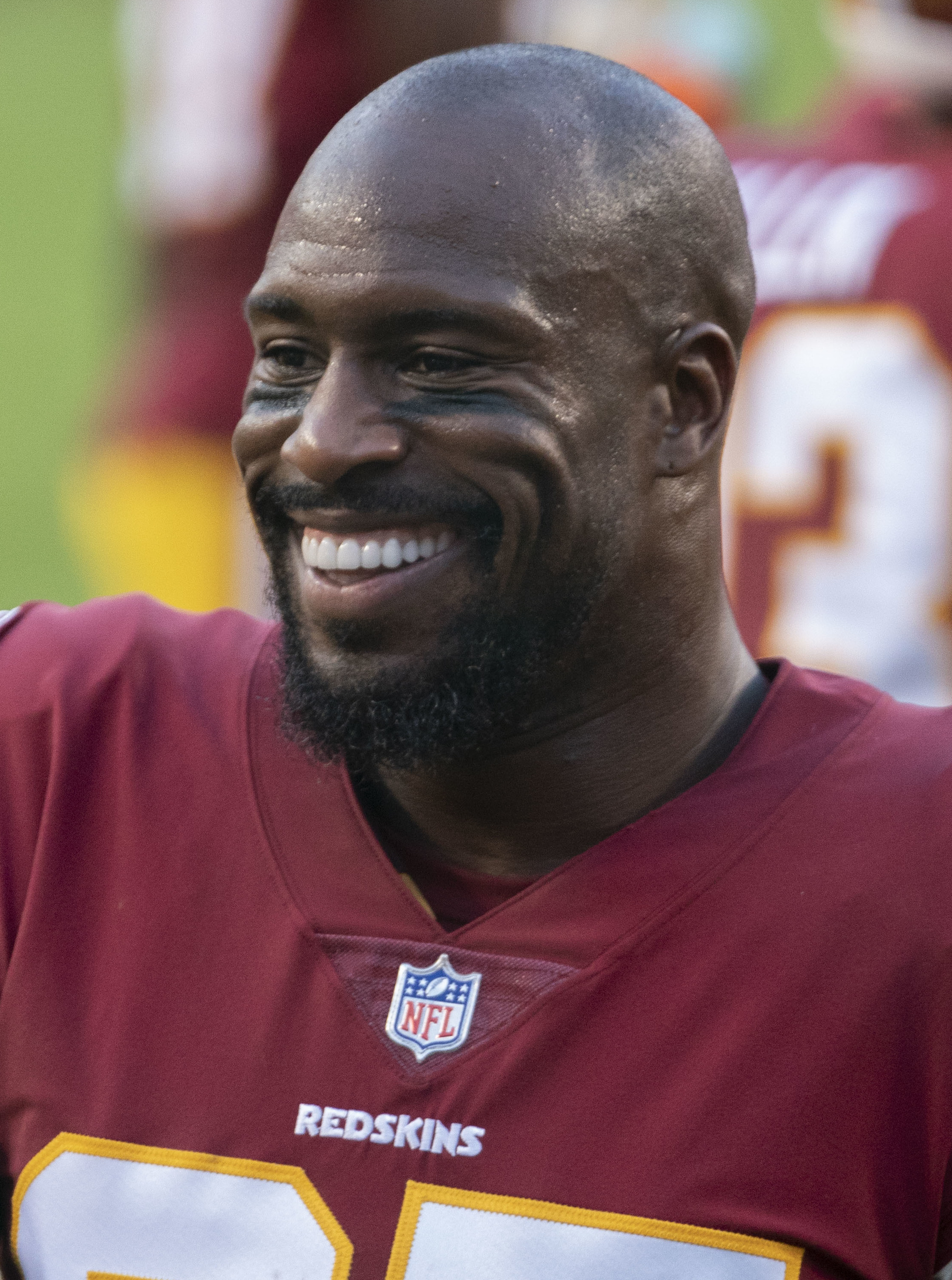
- Davis with the Washington Redskins in 2018

No. 85, 80
- Position: Tight end

Personal information
- Born: January 31, 1984 (age 42); Washington, D.C., U.S.
- Listed height: 6 ft 3 in (1.91 m)
- Listed weight: 248 lb (112 kg)

Career information
- High school: Dunbar (Washington, D.C.)
- College: Maryland (2003–2005)
- NFL draft: 2006: 1st round, 6th overall pick

Career history
- San Francisco 49ers (2006–2015); Denver Broncos (2015); Washington Redskins (2016–2019)

Awards and highlights
- Super Bowl champion (50); Second-team All-Pro (2013); 2× Pro Bowl (2009, 2013); NFL receiving touchdowns co-leader (2009); First-team All-American (2005); First-team All-ACC (2005)

Career NFL statistics
- Receptions: 583
- Receiving yards: 7,562
- Receiving touchdowns: 63
- Stats at Pro Football Reference

Vernon Leonard Davis (born January 31, 1984) is an American former professional football player who was a tight end in the National Football League (NFL). He played college football for the Maryland Terrapins, earning first-team All-American honors in 2005. Davis was selected by the San Francisco 49ers with the sixth overall pick of the 2006 NFL draft. In 2009, he co-led the NFL in touchdown receptions and consequently earned his first of two career Pro Bowl selections.

In the 2011–12 NFL playoffs with the 49ers, Davis caught the game-winning touchdown pass from Alex Smith against the New Orleans Saints, referred to as "the Catch III". In 2015, Davis was traded to the Denver Broncos, where he won Super Bowl 50 with the team over the Carolina Panthers. He then signed with the Washington Redskins in 2016, where he played until retiring following the 2019 season.

== Early life ==
Davis attended Truesdell Elementary in Washington, D.C., and later attended Paul Public Charter School for middle school. However, Paul did not have a football team, and Davis played for neighboring MacFarland Middle School as a result. He went on to attend Dunbar High School in Washington. Davis was a letterman in football, basketball, and track & field. At Dunbar, he was teammates with future Cleveland Browns kick return specialist and wide receiver, Josh Cribbs. Davis played tight end and safety, but he also played wide receiver, kick returner, linebacker, and defensive end. In his senior season, Davis caught 21 passes for 511 yards and five touchdowns, despite missing three games with a deep bone bruise below his knee. Davis also caught three two-point conversions and returned two kick offs and two punts for touchdowns. As a junior, he had 35 receptions for 385 yards. Rated as a four-star recruit by Rivals.com, Davis was listed as the fourth-best tight end prospect of the class of 2003.

- Selected to play in the U.S. Army All-American Bowl
- A member of SuperPrep's Elite 50
- A Mid-Atlantic all-region pick by SuperPrep
- Second team All-USA by USA Today
- Ranked as the fourth-best tight end in the nation by Rivals.com
- Gatorade Player of the Year for the District of Columbia

In track & field, Davis recorded a personal best of 10.7 seconds in the 100 meters, and was the DCIAA champion in the high jump with a jump of 6 ft 6 in (198 cm). He was also a member of the 4 × 100 m (43.68s) relay squad.

College recruiting
Name	Hometown	School	Height	Weight	40^{‡}	Commit date
Vernon Davis; TE	Washington, District of Columbia	Dunbar	6 ft 4 in (1.93 m)	220 lb (100 kg)	4.4	Jul 8, 2003
Vernon Davis; TE	Recruit ratings: Scout: Rivals:					
Overall recruit ranking: Scout: 2 (TE) Rivals: 4 (TE)
‡ Refers to 40-yard dash; Note: In many cases, Scout, Rivals, 247Sports, On3, and ESPN may conflict in their listings of height, weight and 40 time.; In these cases, the average was taken. ESPN grades are on a 100-point scale.; Sources: "2003 Team Ranking". Rivals.com.

== College career ==
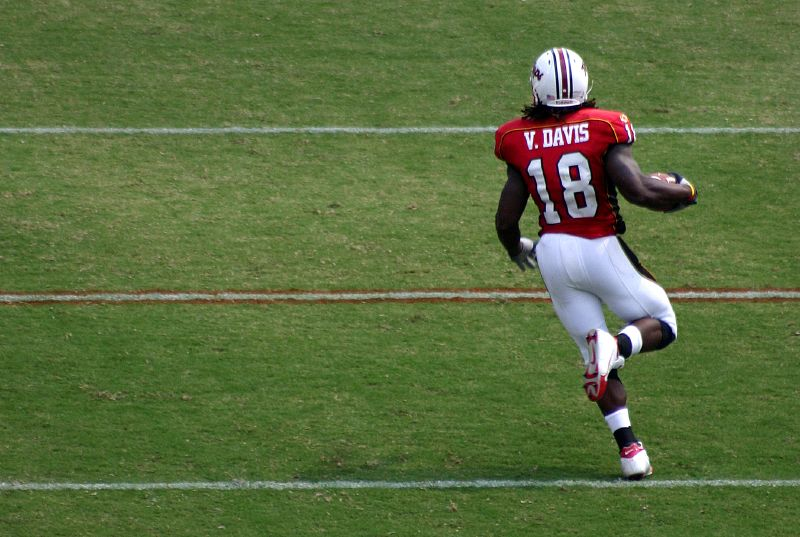
Davis returns a kickoff during a 2005 game against the Clemson Tigers

Davis enrolled in the University of Maryland, where he majored in studio art and played for the Maryland Terrapins football team. In 2003, Davis saw the most consistent action of any true freshman, playing in all thirteen contests. He had five receptions for 87 yards (11.8 avg) and led the kickoff coverage unit with eight solo tackles.

In 2004, Davis played in almost every game, starting at H-back against Northern Illinois, Duke, Georgia Tech, Clemson, Virginia Tech, and Wake Forest. He finished second on the team with 27 catches for 441 yards and had 16.3 avg and three touchdowns.

In 2005, Davis was a consensus All-American and All-Atlantic Coast Conference first-team selection. He was a finalist for the Mackey Award, given to the nation's top tight end. Davis started every game, leading the team with 51 receptions and the conference with 871 receiving yards (17.1 avg). His six touchdown catches rank tenth on the school's season-record list while his 51 receptions also rank tenth on Maryland's annual record chart while his 871 yards rank fifth. Davis was graded 82.5% for blocking consistency as he registered 67 knockdowns, including 18 blocks down field and had eight touchdown-resulting blocks.

Davis was heavily involved with working out in college. He set school strength records (in spring of 2005) for a tight end in the bench press (460 pounds), power-clean (380 pounds), index (824 pounds) and squat (685 pounds). Davis finished his collegiate career with 1,371 yards on 83 receptions for 16.5 yards per catch, the best average of any first round tight end ever and more yards than other previous high first round tight ends such as Tony Gonzalez, Jeremy Shockey, Kyle Brady, and Kellen Winslow II.

In June 2025, Davis was named one of the 79 nominees for the 2026 class of the College Football Hall of Fame.

== Professional career ==
Pre-draft measurables
Height	Weight	Arm length	Hand span	40-yard dash	10-yard split	20-yard split	20-yard shuttle	Three-cone drill	Vertical jump	Broad jump	Bench press	Wonderlic
6 ft 3 1/4 in (1.91 m)	254 lb (115 kg)	32 1/8 in (0.82 m)	8 3/4 in (0.22 m)	4.40 s	1.52 s	2.56 s	4.17 s	7.00 s	42.0 in (1.07 m)	10 ft 8 in (3.25 m)	33 reps	20
All values from NFL Combine

=== San Francisco 49ers ===
==== 2006 season ====
Davis was selected sixth overall in the first round of the 2006 NFL draft by the San Francisco 49ers. He joined Kellen Winslow Jr. as the fourth highest tight end ever drafted after Ron Kramer, (Green Bay, fourth overall in 1957) Mike Ditka (Chicago, fifth overall in 1961), and Riley Odoms (Denver, fifth overall in 1972). Davis was the top tight end prospect in the 2006 NFL Draft, partially due to a strong performance at the scouting combine. He ran the 40-yard dash in 4.40 seconds. Davis also broad-jumped 10'08", nearly a foot farther than the next-best tight end, Marcedes Lewis.

Vernon's first reception in the NFL was a 31-yard touchdown catch from quarterback Alex Smith, against the Arizona Cardinals on September 10, 2006. Smith added a career-long 52-yard touchdown against the Green Bay Packers on December 10 with a short catch followed by a long run. Davis missed six games due an injury he suffered on September 24, 2006. Davis sustained a hairline fracture to his left fibula, on a non-contact play against the Philadelphia Eagles, but returned on November 19 against the Seattle Seahawks.

Davis finished his rookie year with 20 receptions for 265 yards and three touchdowns in 10 games and eight starts.

==== 2007 season ====
During Week 3, Davis was injured while attempting to catch a pass from Smith against the Pittsburgh Steelers. Davis sprained his right knee and missed the next two games. Despite his injury and the 49ers' offensive ineptitude, Davis bettered most of the numbers from his rookie season. Even though his yards per reception diminished, Davis finished his second professional season with 52 receptions for 509 yards and four touchdowns in 14 games and starts.

==== 2008 season ====
In October 2008, after catching a seven-yard pass in the third quarter against the Seahawks, Davis slapped Seahawks safety Brian Russell in the facemask, resulting in a 15-yard penalty, causing head coach Mike Singletary to bench Davis and then send him to the locker room for the rest of the game. After the game, Singletary then spoke his famous "I want winners" rant. This resulted in Davis changing his attitude from himself, to the team. In the next game against the Arizona Cardinals, Davis leaped over a defender and caught a pass from quarterback Shaun Hill resulting in a touchdown, his first of the season.

Davis finished the season with 31 receptions for 358 yards and two touchdowns in 16 games and starts.

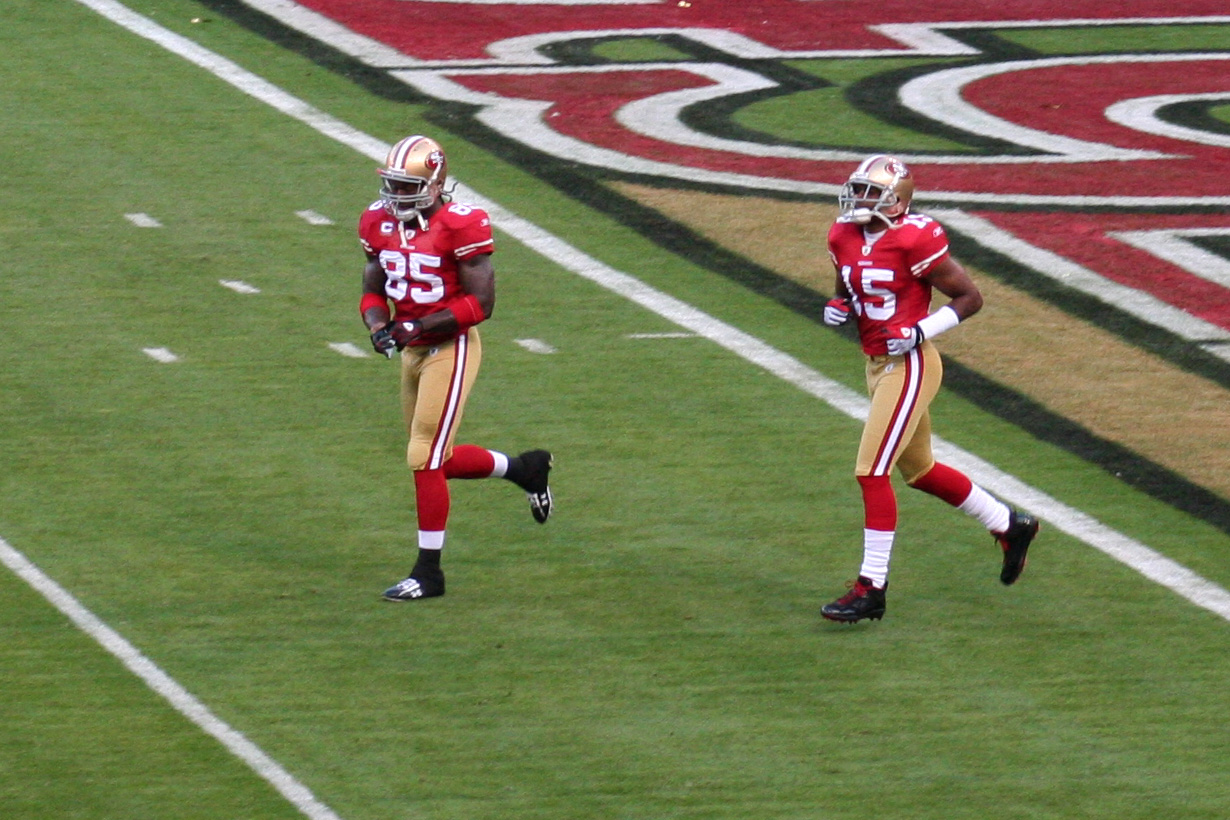
Davis (left) with wide receiver Michael Crabtree in 2009

==== 2009 season ====
Through Week 11 of the 2009 season, Davis led the NFL with nine touchdown receptions, tied with wide receivers Larry Fitzgerald and Randy Moss. In the final game of the regular season, he tied the all-time record for most touchdown receptions for a tight end in a single season with 13, sharing the record set by Antonio Gates of the San Diego Chargers in 2004; that record stood until 2011, when it was broken by Rob Gronkowski of the New England Patriots. Davis was selected to appear in his first Pro Bowl after recording 78 receptions for 965 yards and 13 touchdowns in 16 games and starts.

==== 2010 season ====
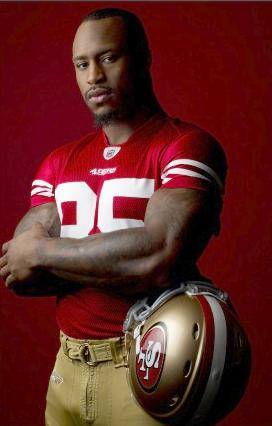
Davis in 2010

Before the 2010 season, Davis was awarded a five-year contract extension for $37 million with $23 million guaranteed. The deal made him the league's highest paid tight end. During a Week 6 17–9 victory over the Oakland Raiders in Week 6, Davis recorded his third straight game with a touchdown.

Davis finished the 2010 season with 56 receptions and 914 yards and seven touchdowns in 16 games and starts. He was ranked 88th by his fellow players on the NFL Top 100 Players of 2011.

==== 2011 season ====
In 2011, Davis had 67 receptions for 792 yards with six touchdowns in 16 games and starts, helping the 49ers win the NFC West division and make the postseason for the first time since 2002. In the playoffs in the Divisional Round against the New Orleans Saints, he had seven receptions for 180 yards, breaking Kellen Winslow's record (166) for most yards by a tight end in a playoff game. Davis scored two touchdowns, and on the game-winning drive, he had a critical 47-yard reception that put the 49ers in a position to tie the game. With nine seconds remaining, Davis caught the game-winning touchdown pass from Alex Smith, now referred to as "Vernon Post" or "The Catch III". Davis caught three passes for 112 yards and another two touchdowns against the New York Giants in the NFC Championship, but the 49ers lost 20–17 in overtime. He was ranked 43rd by his fellow players on the NFL Top 100 Players of 2012.

==== 2012 season ====
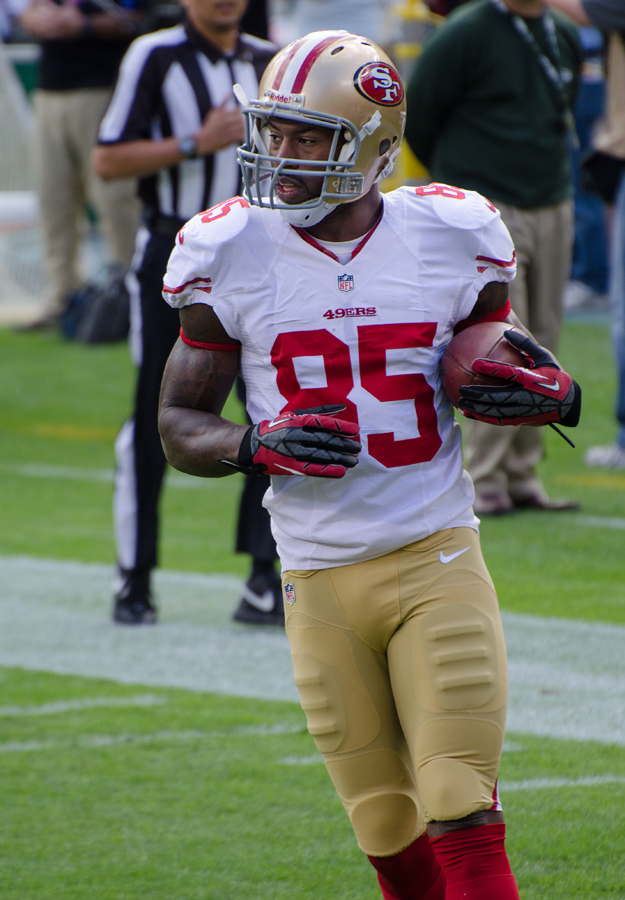
Davis in 2012

During the 2012 season, Davis caught 41 passes for 548 yards and five touchdowns in 16 games and starts.

During the NFC Championship Game, Davis recorded five receptions for 106 yards and a touchdown in the 28–24 comeback victory over the Atlanta Falcons. During Super Bowl XLVII, he had six receptions for 104 yards in the 34–31 loss to the Baltimore Ravens. Davis was ranked 38th by his fellow players on the NFL Top 100 Players of 2013.

==== 2013 season ====
Davis began the 2013 season much like the 2012 playoffs ended: as a trusted and reliable target for quarterback Colin Kaepernick, catching his first touchdown pass of the season in the first quarter of the first game, at Candlestick Park on September 8, 2013, against the Green Bay Packers. Davis finished the 2013 season with 52 receptions for 850 yards and 13 touchdowns in 15 games and starts.

Davis added two touchdown receptions in the playoffs, one coming against the Green Bay Packers in a Wild Card Round victory, and another in a Divisional Round victory over the Carolina Panthers. He was named to the Pro Bowl. Davis was ranked 51st by his fellow players on the NFL Top 100 Players of 2014.

==== 2014 season ====
In 2014, Davis had 26 receptions for 245 yards and two touchdowns, both of which occurred in the season-opening 28–17 road victory over the Dallas Cowboys. He was dealing with ankle and back issues, which hindered him most of the time during the season.

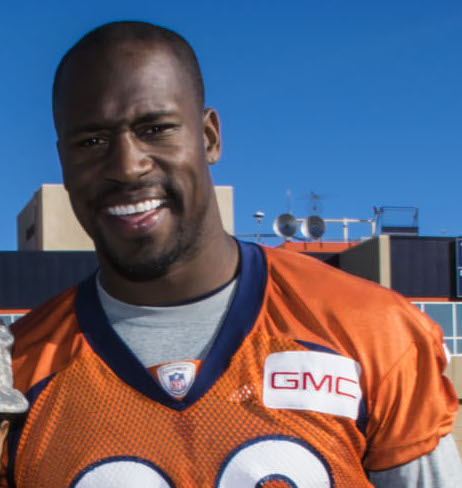
Davis in 2015 with the Broncos

=== Denver Broncos ===
On November 2, 2015, Davis and a 2016 seventh-round draft pick were traded from the San Francisco 49ers to the Denver Broncos for sixth-round picks in 2016 and 2017.

Davis' first game as a member of the Broncos was against his brother Vontae and the Indianapolis Colts. With Brock Osweiler as the starting quarterback, Davis had four receptions for 69 yards during a narrow Week 11 17–15 road victory over the Chicago Bears. He added a combined four receptions for 35 yards in victories over the New England Patriots and San Diego Chargers. Davis had a season-high seven catches for 74 yards during a Week 14 15–12 loss to the Oakland Raiders. On February 7, 2016, Davis won his first Super Bowl championship after the Broncos defeated the Carolina Panthers by a score of 24–10 in Super Bowl 50. Despite ending the Super Bowl with no receptions, Davis made a key block downfield during a crucial 34-yard run by teammate C. J. Anderson, the longest rush of the game.

=== Washington Redskins ===
==== 2016 season ====
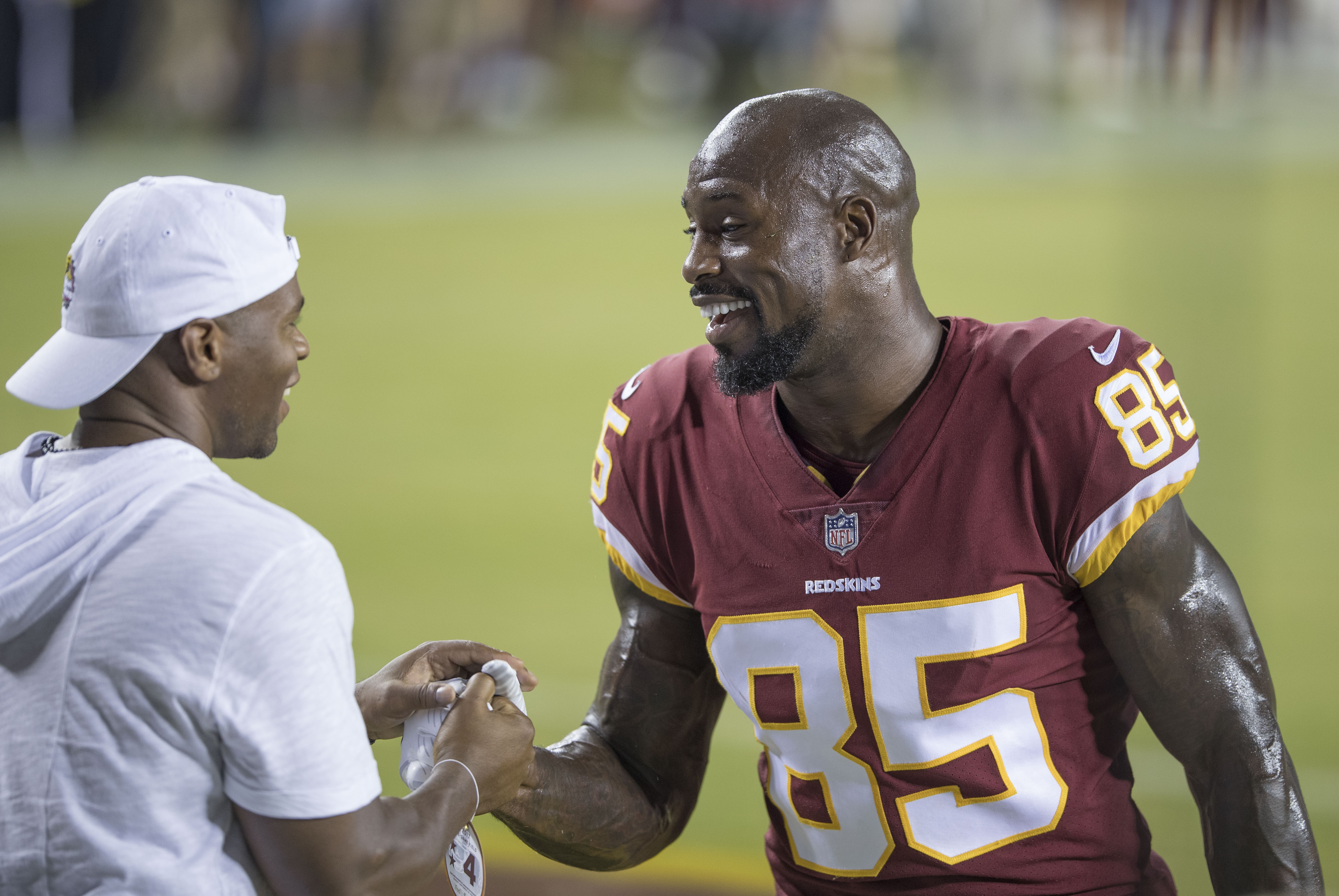
Davis (right) in 2017

On March 31, 2016, Davis signed a one-year contract with his hometown Washington Redskins. During a Week 6 27–20 victory over the Philadelphia Eagles, Davis caught his first touchdown since 2014, helping the Redskins win their fourth straight game of the season. Davis had started the game in replacement of an injured Jordan Reed and finished with two receptions for 50 yards and the aforementioned touchdown. The following week, he earned his third start in a row and finished with six receptions for 79 yards in a 17–20 road loss to the Detroit Lions. The following week, Davis caught five passes for 93 yards in a 27–27 tie with the Cincinnati Bengals. During a Week 9 26–20 victory over the Minnesota Vikings, he caught three passes for 66 yards and caught a 38-yard touchdown reception from quarterback Kirk Cousins.

Davis finished the 2016 season with 44 receptions for 583 receiving yards and two receiving touchdowns.

==== 2017 season ====
On March 8, 2017, Davis signed a three-year contract extension with the Redskins. Overall, in the 2017 season, Davis finished with 43 receptions for 648 yards and three touchdowns in 16 games and starts.

==== 2018 season ====
Davis recorded his first touchdown of the season in Week 6 against the Carolina Panthers. Davis finished the season with 25 receptions for 367 yards and two touchdowns in 14 games and eight starts.

==== 2019 season ====
During the season-opening 32–27 loss the Philadelphia Eagles, Davis caught four passes for 59 yards including a 48-yard touchdown. He was placed on injured reserve on November 22, 2019, after missing most of the season with a concussion.

=== Retirement ===
Davis announced his retirement via a Fox NFL skit prior to Super Bowl LIV on February 2, 2020.

== Career statistics ==
=== NFL ===
Legend
	Won the Super Bowl
	Led the league
**Bold**	Career high

==== Regular season ====
Year	Team	Games		Receiving					Rushing					Fumbles	
Year	Team	GP	GS	Rec	Yds	Avg	Lng	TD	Att	Yds	Avg	Lng	TD	Fum	Lost
2006	SF	10	8	20	265	13.3	52	3	2	5	2.5	9	0	1	1
2007	SF	14	14	52	509	9.8	31	4	0	0	0.0	0	0	1	1
2008	SF	**16**	**16**	31	358	11.5	57	2	1	**11**	**11.0**	**11**	0	2	1
2009	SF	**16**	**16**	**78**	**965**	12.4	**73**	**13**	0	0	0.0	0	0	0	0
2010	SF	**16**	**16**	56	914	**16.3**	66	7	0	0	0.0	0	0	0	0
2011	SF	**16**	**16**	67	792	11.8	44	6	**2**	−5	−2.5	−2	0	**3**	1
2012	SF	**16**	**16**	41	548	13.4	53	5	0	0	0.0	0	0	0	0
2013	SF	15	15	52	850	**16.3**	64	**13**	0	0	0.0	0	0	1	1
2014	SF	14	14	26	245	9.4	29	2	1	4	4.0	4	0	0	0
2015	SF	6	5	18	194	10.8	43	0	0	0	0.0	0	0	0	0
2015	DEN	9	4	20	201	10.1	23	0	0	0	0.0	0	0	0	0
2016	WAS	**16**	14	44	583	13.3	44	2	0	0	0.0	0	0	0	0
2017	WAS	**16**	**16**	43	648	15.1	69	3	0	0	0.0	0	0	2	**2**
2018	WAS	14	8	25	367	14.7	53	2	0	0	0.0	0	0	0	0
2019	WAS	4	1	10	123	12.3	48	1	0	0	0.0	0	0	0	0
Career		198	179	583	7,562	13.0	73	63	6	15	2.5	11	0	10	7

==== Postseason ====
Year	Team	Games		Receiving					Rushing					Fumbles	
Year	Team	GP	GS	Rec	Yds	Avg	Lng	TD	Att	Yds	Avg	Lng	TD	Fum	Lost
2011	SF	2	2	10	**292**	**29.2**	**73**	**4**	0	0	0.0	0	0	0	0
2012	SF	**3**	**3**	**12**	254	21.2	44	1	0	0	0.0	0	0	0	0
2013	SF	**3**	**3**	5	54	10.8	28	2	0	0	0.0	0	0	0	0
2015	DEN	**3**	1	0	0	0.0	0	0	0	0	0.0	0	0	0	0
Career		11	9	27	600	22.2	73	7	0	0	0.0	0	0	0	0

=== College ===
Season	Team	GP	Receiving					Rushing				
Season	Team	GP	Rec	Yds	Avg	Lng	TD	Att	Yds	Avg	Lng	TD
2003	Maryland	13	5	59	11.8	28	0	0	0	0.0	0	0
2004	Maryland	11	27	441	16.3	46	3	1	−2	−2.0	−2	0
2005	Maryland	11	51	871	17.1	73	6	1	7	7.0	7	0
Career		35	83	1,371	16.5	73	9	2	5	2.5	7	0

== Personal life ==
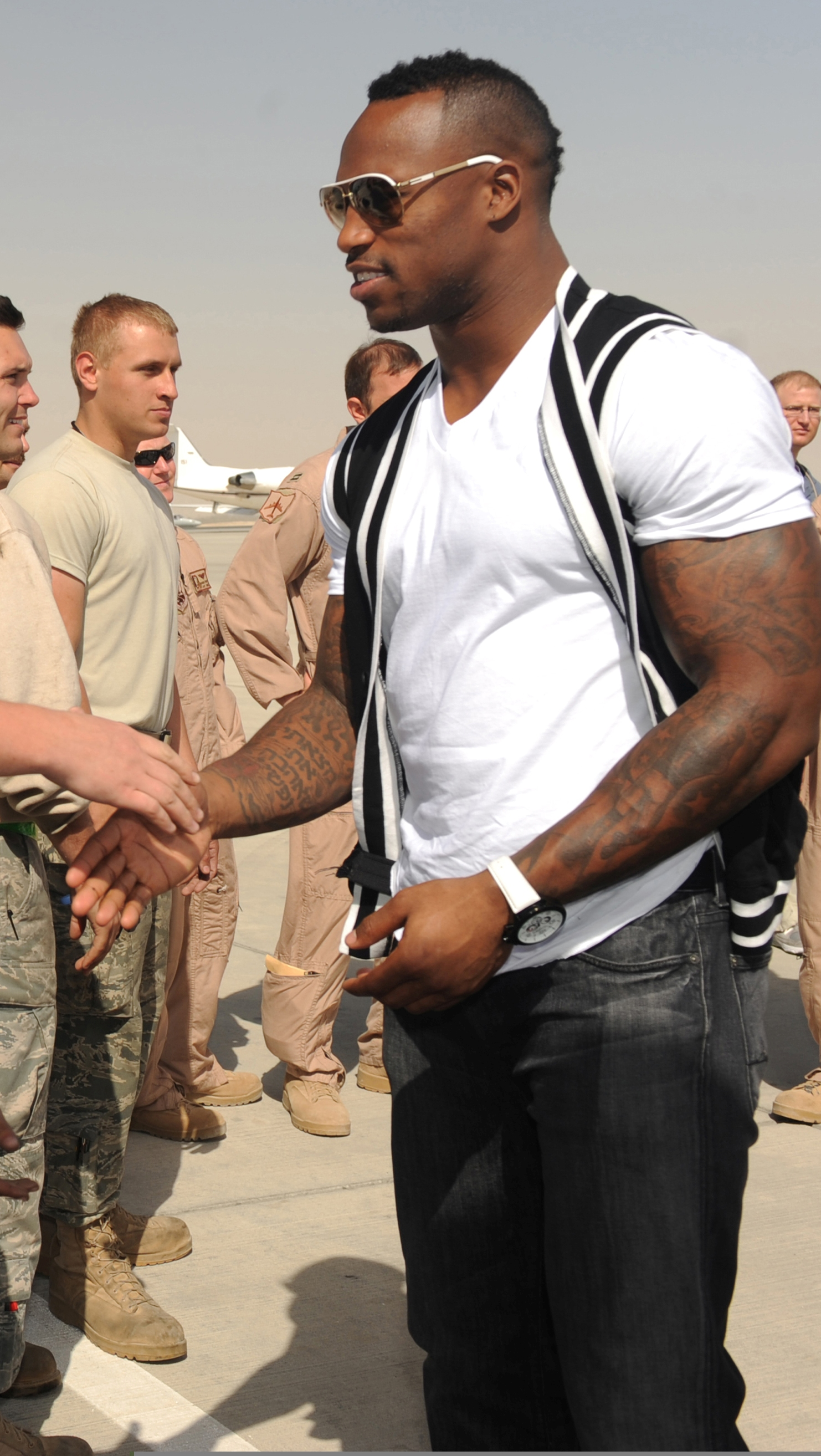
Davis visiting American military members in Southwest Asia in March 2010

Davis is an avid curling fan. He hosted an event for his charity in San Jose, California, in which the event was curling. Davis was named honorary captain of the Men's U.S. Olympic Curling team for the 2010 Winter Olympics in Vancouver.

In late 2010, Davis founded Modern Class Design (MCD) with business partner Antone Barnes. Modern Class Design is a full-service fine arts and interior design company that offers comprehensive design services for homes and commercial spaces including interiors and landscape architecture. Davis also owns a chain of Jamba Juice franchises.

In December 2012, Davis opened Gallery 85 on Santana Row in San Jose, California. Gallery 85 is an art gallery for new and emerging artists giving them access to high-end exposure.

In October 2013, it was reported that Davis would be offering stock in his future earnings through a venture with Fantex as part of a new financial instrument being sold by Fantex. Davis planned to offer a 10% share of all future earnings from his brand marketing company to Fantex, which would then turn around and divide it into shares of a tracking stock that can be traded within their own exchange. In January 2014, the stock offering was confirmed. The proposed offering was 421,100 shares, valued at $10 per share, for a total proposed valuation worth $4.2 million.

Davis' younger brother was former NFL cornerback Vontae Davis, who played for the Miami Dolphins and Indianapolis Colts before retiring during halftime as a member of the Buffalo Bills and died suddenly on April 1, 2024. His cousin, Jaden Davis, plays in the NFL for the Arizona Cardinals. Davis' son, Jianni, currently plays for the University of Maryland.

=== Media appearances ===
In 2013, Davis made a cameo appearance in the music video for the song "Get Lo" by Ron Artest and Mike Jones, as well as an acting appearance as himself in a 5th season episode of The League.

Davis made an appearance on Pretty Wild and Whose Line is it Anyway? in 2015.

Davis was a judge on ABC's BattleBots in its second season.

Davis hosted the reunion and behind-the scenes special for MTV's The Challenge: Total Madness, both of which aired in July 2020. In September 2020, Davis was announced as one of the celebrities competing in the 29th season of Dancing with the Stars. He partnered with Peta Murgatroyd and was the fifth couple eliminated from the competition, lasting six weeks.

On April 28, 2021, Davis returned as the host for the two-part reunion of The Challenge: Double Agents.

In March and April 2022, Davis served as a judge for Season 1 of Domino Masters on Fox.

Davis also starred in the crime thriller The Ritual Killer as "Randoku", which was released on March 10, 2023. The movie is about a detective hunting for an international murderer committing ritualistic killings in a small Mississippi town. The movie stars Morgan Freeman and Cole Hauser.

In 2022, it was announced that Davis would star in the comedy film Plan B, alongside Jon Heder, Tom Berenger, and Shannon Elizabeth.

Davis competed in the seventh season of the HGTV series Rock the Block which premiered in April 2026 and was partnered with Mina Starsiak Hawk, star of Good Bones.

== Business ventures ==
Following his NFL career, Davis has been active as an entrepreneur and investor across a variety of industries. He joined David Stern, Jim Boeheim, Steve Smith, and others as an early investor in SportsCastr, a live-streaming platform that allows fans and athletes to provide commentary on games. In 2012, he co-founded an interior design company, Modern Class Design (MCD), along with music industry executive Antone Barnes. In 2022, he became a brand ambassador and investor in JAXJOX, a smart home fitness startup. Davis also co-developed Gloriana, a luxury townhouse project in Washington, D.C., and has been involved in other real estate ventures, including a multifamily housing community in Ohio.

In professional sports, he is a minority owner of DC Power FC, a women’s soccer team in the USL Super League, and joined the ownership group of the Brisbane Bullets, a basketball team in Australia’s National Basketball League.
