= 2013–14 NFL playoffs =

American football tournament

- Dates: January 4–February 2, 2014
- Season: 2013
- Teams: 12
- Games played: 11
- Super Bowl XLVIII site: MetLife Stadium; East Rutherford, New Jersey
- Defending champions: Baltimore Ravens (did not qualify)
- Champion: Seattle Seahawks (1st title)
- Runner-up: Denver Broncos
- Conference runners-up: New England Patriots; San Francisco 49ers
NFL playoffs
← 2012–13	2014–15 →

The National Football League playoffs for the 2013 season began on January 4, 2014. The postseason tournament concluded with the Seattle Seahawks defeating the Denver Broncos in Super Bowl XLVIII, 43–8, on February 2, at MetLife Stadium in East Rutherford, New Jersey.

== Participants ==
Within each conference, the four division winners and the top two non-division winners with the best overall regular season records) qualified for the playoffs. The four division winners are seeded 1–4 based on their overall won-lost-tied record, and the wild card teams are seeded 5–6. The NFL does not use a fixed bracket playoff system, and there are no restrictions regarding teams from the same division matching up in any round. In the first round, dubbed the wild-card playoffs or wild-card weekend, the third-seeded division winner hosts the sixth-seed wild card, and the fourth seed hosts the fifth. The 1 and 2 seeds from each conference received a first-round bye. In the second round, the divisional playoffs, the number 1 seed hosts the worst-surviving seed from the first round (seed 4, 5, or 6), while the number 2 seed will play the other team (seed 3, 4, or 5). The two surviving teams from each conference's divisional playoff games met in the respective AFC and NFC Conference Championship games, hosted by the higher seed. Although the Super Bowl, the championship round of the playoffs, is played at a neutral site, the designated home team is based on an annual rotation by conference.

Playoff seeds
Seed	AFC	NFC
1	Denver Broncos (West winner)	Seattle Seahawks (West winner)
2	New England Patriots (East winner)	Carolina Panthers (South winner)
3	Cincinnati Bengals (North winner)	Philadelphia Eagles (East winner)
4	Indianapolis Colts (South winner)	Green Bay Packers (North winner)
5	Kansas City Chiefs (wild card)	San Francisco 49ers (wild card)
6	San Diego Chargers (wild card)	New Orleans Saints (wild card)

== Bracket ==
Jan 5 – Lambeau Field	Jan 12 – Bank of America Stadium
5	San Francisco	23
5	San Francisco	23
4	Green Bay	20	Jan 19 – CenturyLink Field
2	Carolina	10
NFC
Jan 4 – Lincoln Financial Field	5	San Francisco	17
Jan 11 – CenturyLink Field
1	Seattle	23
6	New Orleans	26	NFC Championship
6	New Orleans	15
3	Philadelphia	24	Feb 2 – MetLife Stadium
1	Seattle	23
Wild Card playoffs
Divisional playoffs
Jan 4 – Lucas Oil Stadium	N1	Seattle	43
Jan 11 – Gillette Stadium
A1	Denver	8
5	Kansas City	44	Super Bowl XLVIII
4	Indianapolis	22
4	Indianapolis	45	Jan 19 – Sports Authority Field at Mile High
2	New England	43
AFC
Jan 5 – Paul Brown Stadium	2	New England	16
Jan 12 – Sports Authority Field at Mile High
1	Denver	26
6	San Diego	27	AFC Championship
6	San Diego	17
3	Cincinnati	10
1	Denver	24

== Schedule ==
In a change from previous seasons, both late games during the Divisional Playoffs were AFC games (as opposed to each conference having both an early game on one day and a late game on the other day).

In the United States, NBC broadcast the first two Wild Card playoff games, then CBS broadcast the rest of the AFC playoff games. Fox televised the rest of the NFC games and the Super Bowl. All games were broadcast on Westwood One radio.

Round	Away team	Score	Home team	Date	Kickoff (ET / UTC-5)	TV
Wild-card round	Kansas City Chiefs	44–45	Indianapolis Colts	January 4, 2014	4:35 p.m.	NBC
Wild-card round	New Orleans Saints	26–24	Philadelphia Eagles	January 4, 2014	8:10 p.m.	NBC
Wild-card round	San Diego Chargers	27–10	Cincinnati Bengals	January 5, 2014	1:05 p.m.	CBS
Wild-card round	San Francisco 49ers	23–20	Green Bay Packers	January 5, 2014	4:40 p.m.	Fox
Divisional round	New Orleans Saints	15–23	Seattle Seahawks	January 11, 2014	4:35 p.m.	Fox
Divisional round	Indianapolis Colts	22–43	New England Patriots	January 11, 2014	8:15 p.m.	CBS
Divisional round	San Francisco 49ers	23–10	Carolina Panthers	January 12, 2014	1:05 p.m.	Fox
Divisional round	San Diego Chargers	17–24	Denver Broncos	January 12, 2014	4:40 p.m.	CBS
Conference championships	New England Patriots	16–26	Denver Broncos	January 19, 2014	3:00 p.m.	CBS
Conference championships	San Francisco 49ers	17–23	Seattle Seahawks	January 19, 2014	6:30 p.m.	Fox
Super Bowl XLVIII MetLife Stadium East Rutherford, New Jersey	Seattle Seahawks	43–8	Denver Broncos	February 2, 2014	6:25 p.m.	Fox

== Wild-card round ==
=== Saturday, January 4, 2014 ===
==== AFC: Indianapolis Colts 45, Kansas City Chiefs 44 ====
Kansas City Chiefs vs. Indianapolis Colts – Game summary

Quarter	1	2	3	4	Total
Chiefs	10	21	10	3	44
Colts	7	3	21	14	45

at Lucas Oil Stadium, Indianapolis, Indiana

- Date: January 4
- Game time: 4:35 pm EST/1:35 pm PST
- Game weather: Played with the roof closed, retractable roof stadium
- Game attendance: 63,551
- Referee: Walt Anderson
- TV announcers (NBC): Dan Hicks (play-by-play), Mike Mayock (color commentator), and Alex Flanagan (sideline reporter)
- Recap, Game book, Scoring Timeline

Game information

1st quarter

- KC – Dwayne Bowe 6-yard pass from Alex Smith (Ryan Succop kick), 8:11. Chiefs 7–0. Drive: 14 plays, 82 yards, 6:49.
- IND – T. Y. Hilton 10-yard pass from Andrew Luck (Adam Vinatieri kick), 4:34. Tied 7–7. Drive: 7 plays, 74 yards, 3:37.
- KC – Ryan Succop 19-yard field goal, 0:53. Chiefs 10–7. Drive: 7 plays, 73 yards, 3:41.

2nd quarter

- KC – Donnie Avery 79-yard pass from Alex Smith (Ryan Succop kick), 14:39. Chiefs 17–7. Drive: 3 plays, 79 yards, 0:21.
- KC – Anthony Sherman 5-yard pass from Alex Smith (Ryan Succop kick), 13:05. Chiefs 24–7. Drive: 3 plays, 17 yards, 1:23.
- IND – Adam Vinatieri 37-yard field goal, 9:14. Chiefs 24–10. Drive: 12 plays, 61 yards, 3:51.
- KC – Knile Davis 4-yard run (Ryan Succop kick), 1:51. Chiefs 31–10. Drive: 15 plays, 81 yards, 7:23.

3rd quarter

- KC – Knile Davis 10-yard pass from Alex Smith (Ryan Succop kick), 13:39. Chiefs 38–10. Drive: 3 plays, 18 yards, 1:15.
- IND – Donald Brown 10-yard run (Adam Vinatieri kick), 11:47. Chiefs 38–17. Drive: 5 plays, 80 yards, 1:52.
- IND – Donald Brown 3-yard pass from Andrew Luck (Adam Vinatieri kick), 7:32. Chiefs 38–24. Drive: 5 plays, 41 yards, 1:28.
- KC – Ryan Succop 42-yard field goal, 4:12. Chiefs 41–24. Drive: 4 plays, 4 yards, 1:32.
- IND – Coby Fleener 12-yard pass from Andrew Luck (Adam Vinatieri kick), 2:31. Chiefs 41–31. Drive: 6 plays, 80 yards, 1:41.

4th quarter

- IND – Andrew Luck 5-yard fumble recovery (Adam Vinatieri kick), 10:38. Chiefs 41–38. Drive: 12 plays, 90 yards, 4:02.
- KC – Ryan Succop 43-yard field goal, 5:36. Chiefs 44–38. Drive: 11 plays, 58 yards, 5:02.
- IND – T. Y. Hilton 64-yard pass from Andrew Luck (Adam Vinatieri kick), 4:21. Colts 45–44. Drive: 4 plays, 80 yards, 1:15.

Leading passers

- KC – Alex Smith – 30/46, 378 yards, 4 TD
- IND – Andrew Luck – 29/45, 443 yards, 4 TD, 3 INT

Leading rushers

- KC – Knile Davis – 19 rushes, 57 yards, 2 TD
- IND – Donald Brown – 10 rushes, 65 yards, 1 TD

Leading receivers

- KC – Dwayne Bowe – 8 rec, 150 yards, 1 TD
- IND – T. Y. Hilton – 13 rec, 224 yards, 2 TD

Trailing 38–10 a few minutes into the third quarter, Indianapolis scored 35 second half points to overcome a 28-point deficit to win, 45–44, in the second biggest comeback victory in NFL postseason history, behind just the Buffalo Bills' 32-point deficit in their 41–38 comeback Wild Card game win against the Houston Oilers in 1992. For Kansas City, the loss extended their playoff win drought to 20 years.

The game got off to a rough start for the Chiefs, as starting running back Jamaal Charles was knocked out of the game on the opening drive. But before this, he rushed three times for 18 yards as the team drove 84 yards in 14 plays. Quarterback Alex Smith added a 16-yard run, and converted the drive's only third down with a 7-yard touchdown pass to Dwayne Bowe. Indianapolis quarterback Andrew Luck quickly led his team back, completing seven consecutive passes for 74 yards. Four of them went to T. Y. Hilton, including a 24-yarder and a 10-yard touchdown catch to tie the game at 7. On the next possession, Smith completed a 68-yard pass to Bowe at the Colts 2-yard line. But the team could not get into the end zone with their next three plays and had to settle for Ryan Succop's 19-yard field goal to take a 10–7 lead. Then after a Colts three-and-out, Smith launched a 79-yard touchdown bomb to Donnie Avery, increasing the Chiefs lead to 17–7 21 seconds into the second quarter.

The situation continued to deteriorate for Indianapolis. On the first play of their next possession, Trent Richardson lost a fumble that linebacker Justin Houston recovered and returned seven yards to the Colts 17-yard line. Two plays later, Smith's 5-yard touchdown throw to fullback Anthony Sherman on a shovel pass made the score 24–7. This time the Colts managed to respond with a 61-yard scoring drive in which Luck completed a 16-yard pass to Griff Whalen and rushed for a 21-yard gain after faking a hand off up the middle on a fourth and 1 conversion. Adam Vinatieri finished the drive with a 37-yard field goal, cutting the score to 24–10. However, Smith also got to pass and rush, as he carried the ball four times for 24 yards and completed five passes for 33 on an 81-yard drive that ended with Knile Davis' 4-yard touchdown run, putting the Chiefs up 31–10. The Colts managed to reach midfield on their next possession, but Brandon Flowers intercepted a pass from Luck to keep them from scoring before halftime.

On the first play of the second half, Husain Abdullah intercepted Luck and returned the ball four yards to the Colts' 18-yard line, sitting up Smith's 10-yard scoring toss to Davis that put them up by 28, 38–10. It seemed that Kansas City was in complete control of the game, but Indianapolis suddenly stormed back with 14 unanswered points. First, Luck's 46-yard completion to reserve receiver Da'Rick Rogers moved the ball to the Chiefs' 10-yard line, and Donald Brown ran the ball into the end zone on the next play. Then linebacker Robert Mathis forced a fumble while sacking Smith, and fellow linebacker Kelvin Sheppard recovered for the Colts on the Chiefs' 41-yard line just before it rolled out of bounds. The offense then capitalized with Luck completing four out of five passes, the last a 3-yard scoring pass to Brown that cut the score to 38–24.

Following a Chiefs punt, Abdullah intercepted another pass from Luck. Kansas City took over on the Indianapolis 28-yard line, and scored on a 42-yard Succop field goal to give them a 17-point lead, 41–24, with just over five minutes left in the third quarter. But Luck quickly led the Colts back, completing a 25-yard pass to Brown on the first play of the next possession, and later hooking up with LaVon Brazill for a 35-yard gain before finishing it off with a 12-yard touchdown pass to tight end Coby Fleener. Then after a three-and-out, Kansas City punter Dustin Colquitt's 31-yard boot pinned Indianapolis back at their own 10-yard line. But it did not stop the Colts, as Luck completed five out of six passes for 61 yards and rushed for 12 on a 90-yard scoring drive. On the last play, Brown fumbled the ball while trying to run it into the end zone, but it bounced right back into the hands of Luck, who took it across the goal line himself for a touchdown. With this score, the lead was cut to 41–38 with 10:38 left in the game.

Aided by A. J. Jenkins' 27-yard reception, the Chiefs managed to run the clock down to 5:36 with their ensuing drive. Succop finished it off with a 43-yard field goal to put the team up by six points. But three plays after the kickoff, Luck fired a deep pass to Hilton over the middle, who caught it without breaking stride and took off for a 64-yard touchdown catch, giving Indy their first lead of the game at 45–44. With 4:21 left, Kansas City desperately tried to get in range for a go-ahead field goal. Smith started the drive with a pair of completions to Bowe for 38 yards. But after a 3-yard running play moved the ball to the Colts 39-yard line, Smith was flagged for a 10-yard intentional grounding penalty. The next play netted the team six yards, bringing up fourth down and 11. On the next play, Smith threw a deep pass to Bowe along the right sideline. Bowe made a leaping catch with enough yardage for a first down, but landed with only one foot in bounds, causing a turnover on downs and allowing Indianapolis to run out the rest of the clock.

For Kansas City, Smith finished the game 30-for-46 for 378 yards and four touchdowns, while also rushing for 57 yards. His top receiver was Bowe, who caught eight passes for 150 yards and a touchdown. Davis rushed for 67 yards, caught seven passes for 33 yards, and scored two touchdowns. Abdullah had six tackles and two interceptions. For Indianapolis, Luck finished 29-for-45 for 443 yards and four touchdowns, with three interceptions. He also rushed for 45 yards and scored a fumble recovery touchdown. Hilton caught 13 passes for 224 yards – the third highest total in postseason history – and two touchdowns.

Both teams combined for 1,049 total yards (513 for Kansas City, 536 for Indianapolis), an NFL postseason record. This was the first wildcard playoff game ever to feature two former number one draft picks at quarterback; Smith in 2005 and Luck in 2012. This was the eighth consecutive playoff loss for Kansas City, an NFL record.

This was the fourth postseason meeting between the Colts and Chiefs. Indianapolis won all three prior meetings, including 23-8 in the 2006 AFC Wild Card playoffs.

==== NFC: New Orleans Saints 26, Philadelphia Eagles 24 ====
New Orleans Saints vs. Philadelphia Eagles – Game summary

Quarter	1	2	3	4	Total
Saints	0	6	14	6	26
Eagles	0	7	7	10	24

at Lincoln Financial Field, Philadelphia, Pennsylvania

- Date: January 4
- Game time: 8:10 pm EST/5:10 pm PST
- Game weather: 25 °F (−4 °C), clear
- Game attendance: 69,144
- Referee: Bill Vinovich
- TV announcers (NBC): Al Michaels (play-by-play), Cris Collinsworth (color commentator), and Michele Tafoya (sideline reporter)
- Recap, Game book

Game information

1st quarter

- None.

2nd quarter

- NO – Shayne Graham 36-yard field goal, 8:37. Saints 3–0. Drive: 11 plays, 43 yards, 5:45.
- PHI – Riley Cooper 10-yard pass from Nick Foles (Alex Henery kick), 1:48. Eagles 7–3. Drive: 6 plays, 44 yards, 2:24.
- NO – Shayne Graham 46-yard field goal, 0:00. Eagles 7–6. Drive: 8 plays, 47 yards, 1:48.

3rd quarter

- NO – Lance Moore 24-yard pass from Drew Brees (Shayne Graham kick), 10:08. Saints 13–7. Drive: 6 plays, 53 yards, 3:34.
- NO – Mark Ingram II 4-yard run (Shayne Graham kick), 3:54. Saints 20–7. Drive: 8 plays, 66 yards, 4:52.
- PHI – LeSean McCoy 1-yard run (Alex Henery kick), 0:32. Saints 20–14. Drive: 7 plays, 65 yards, 3:22.

4th quarter

- PHI – Alex Henery 31-yard field goal, 11:14. Saints 20–17. Drive: 7 plays, 28 yards, 2:59.
- NO – Shayne Graham 35-yard field goal, 8:04. Saints 23–17. Drive: 7 plays, 58 yards, 3:10.
- PHI – Zach Ertz 3-yard pass from Nick Foles (Alex Henery kick), 4:54. Eagles 24–23. Drive: 8 plays, 77 yards, 3:10.
- NO – Shayne Graham 32-yard field goal, 0:00. Saints 26–24. Drive: 10 plays, 34 yards, 4:54.

Leading passers

- NO – Drew Brees – 20/30, 250 yards, 1 TD, 2 INT
- PHI – Nick Foles – 23/33, 195 yards, 2 TD

Leading rushers

- NO – Mark Ingram II – 18 rushes, 97 yards, 1 TD
- PHI – LeSean McCoy – 21 rushes, 77 yards, 1 TD

Leading receivers

- NO – Jimmy Graham – 3 rec, 44 yards
- PHI – Riley Cooper – 6 rec, 68 yards, 1 TD

Saints kicker Shayne Graham, who was signed by the team just a few weeks before this game, kicked four field goals, the last a game winner as time expired to give the team their first road playoff win in franchise history.

The first quarter of the game was scoreless. The farthest the Saints made it was to the Eagles 49-yard line, and that drive ended when Drew Brees was intercepted by Bradley Fletcher, who returned the ball 24 yards to the New Orleans 27-yard line. After the turnover, Philadelphia drove to the Saints 15-yard line, but New Orleans' defense made two key plays to prevent a score. First, Curtis Lofton tackled tight end Brent Celek on a screen pass for an 8-yard loss. Then defensive end Cameron Jordan sacked Nick Foles for an 11-yard loss, pushing the Eagles all the way back to the 34-yard line. Following a 4-yard gain on third down, Alex Henery missed a 48-yard field goal 34 seconds into the second quarter.

After the miss, New Orleans drove 43 yards to score on Graham's 36-yard field goal and take the lead, aided by a replay review that caused officials to overturn a lost fumble by tight end Jimmy Graham. New Orleans subsequently forced the Eagles to punt on their next drive, but then linebacker DeMeco Ryans intercepted Brees and returned the ball 23 yards to the Saints' 44-yard line. Philadelphia receiver Riley Cooper started off their possession with a 22-yard reception, and finished it with a 10-yard touchdown catch to give the Eagles a 7–3 lead. New Orleans responded with a 47-yard scoring drive, with Brees completing a 17-yard pass to Jimmy Graham and a 13-yarder to Kenny Stills on the way to a 46-yard field goal by Shayne Graham with less than two minutes left in the half, cutting the score to 7–6 going into halftime.

Philadelphia was forced to punt on their opening drive of the second half, and Darren Sproles returned the ball 12 yards to the Saints 47-yard line. Aided by Mark Ingram's three carries for 24 yards, New Orleans drove 53 yards to score their first touchdown on Brees' 24-yard pass to receiver Lance Moore, giving them a 13–7 lead. The next time New Orleans had the ball, they matched that feat with a 66-yard scoring drive. Tight end Benjamin Watson caught a 24-yard pass, while Ingram had five carries for 26 yards, the last a 4-yard touchdown run that put his team up 20–7. The Eagles managed to respond, with Foles' 40-yard completion to DeSean Jackson setting up a 1-yard touchdown run by LeSean McCoy, trimming their deficit to 20–14 with just over 30 seconds left in the third quarter.

New Orleans went three-and-out on their next drive, and Jackson's 29-yard punt return to the Saints' 40-yard line set up Henery's 30-yard field goal. But Brees' 40-yard completion to Robert Meachem helped move the Saints in range for another Graham field goal to put them back up by six points at 23–17. Taking the ball back with just over eight minutes left in regulation, the Eagles managed to drive 77 yards to take the lead, aided by a 40-yard pass interference penalty on Corey White. Foles finished the drive with a 3-yard touchdown toss to tight end Zach Ertz, giving the Eagles a 24–23 lead with 4:54 remaining. However, the Saints would need to cover little ground for their game-winning drive, as Sproles returned the ensuing kickoff 39 yards, with a horse-collar tackle penalty on Cary Williams adding on another 15. As a result, New Orleans got the ball on the Eagles' 48-yard line and needed just 34 yards to set up Graham's game-winning 32-yard field goal – as time expired – which they managed to space out over 10 plays to run the clock down to three seconds on the play.

Foles finished his first playoff game completing 23 of 33 passes for 195 yards and two touchdowns. Cooper was the top receiver of the game with six catches for 68 yards. Ryans had 10 tackles – eight of which were solo tackles – and an interception. Brees threw for 250 yards and a touchdown, with two interceptions. Ingram was the game's top rusher with 18 carries for 97 yards and a touchdown, while also catching three passes for 17 yards.

This game was notable for featuring two starting quarterbacks who went to the same high school, Westlake High School in Austin, Texas; Brees graduated in 1997, while Foles graduated in 2007, ten years apart from each other.

This was the third postseason meeting between the Saints and Eagles. The teams split the two previous meetings. New Orleans won the last meeting 27–24 in the 2006 NFC Divisional playoffs.

=== Sunday, January 5, 2014 ===
==== AFC: San Diego Chargers 27, Cincinnati Bengals 10 ====
San Diego Chargers vs. Cincinnati Bengals – Game summary

Quarter	1	2	3	4	Total
Chargers	7	0	10	10	27
Bengals	0	10	0	0	10

at Paul Brown Stadium, Cincinnati, Ohio

- Date: January 5
- Game time: 1:05 pm EST/10:05 am PST
- Game weather: 42 °F (6 °C), cloudy
- Game attendance: 62,277
- Referee: Jeff Triplette
- TV announcers (CBS): Jim Nantz (play-by-play), Phil Simms (color commentator), and Tracy Wolfson (sideline reporter)
- Recap, Game book

Game information

1st quarter

- SD – Danny Woodhead 5-yard run (Nick Novak kick), 0:48. Chargers 7–0. Drive: 12 plays, 86 yards, 6:56.

2nd quarter

- CIN – Jermaine Gresham 4-yard pass from Andy Dalton (Mike Nugent kick), 5:59. Tied 7–7. Drive: 10 plays, 60 yards, 6:07.
- CIN – Mike Nugent 46-yard field goal, 0:00. Bengals 10–7. Drive: 6 plays, 40 yards, 1:14.

3rd quarter

- SD – Ladarius Green 4-yard pass from Philip Rivers (Nick Novak kick), 6:46. Chargers 14–10. Drive: 10 plays, 80 yards, 5:40.
- SD – Nick Novak 25-yard field goal, 2:00. Chargers 17–10. Drive: 9 plays, 40 yards, 3:41.

4th quarter

- SD – Nick Novak 23-yard field goal, 14:16. Chargers 20–10. Drive: 5 plays, −2 yards, 1:55.
- SD – Ronnie Brown 58-yard run (Nick Novak kick), 2:17. Chargers 27–10. Drive: 2 plays, 60 yards, 0:50.

Leading passers

- SD – Philip Rivers – 12/16, 128 yards, 1 TD
- CIN – Andy Dalton – 29/51, 334 yards, 1 TD, 2 INT

Leading rushers

- SD – Ronnie Brown – 8 rushes, 77 yards, 1 TD
- CIN – Giovani Bernard – 12 rushes, 45 yards

Leading receivers

- SD – Ladarius Green – 3 rec, 34 yards, 1 TD
- CIN – Marvin Jones – 8 rec, 130 yards

Although the Bengals outgained San Diego in total yards, 439–319, and first downs, 27–16, the Chargers defense forced four turnovers, two failed fourth down conversion attempts, and shut out Cincinnati in the second half to give the Bengals their first home loss of the season and their sixth consecutive playoff loss since 1990.

After a pair of punts started the game, San Diego drove 86 yards in 12 plays, including a 22-yard reception by tight end Ladarius Green, and scored on Danny Woodhead's 5-yard touchdown run. Following two more punts, Cincinnati tied the score with a 60-yard scoring drive. The key player on it was rookie running back Giovani Bernard, who rushed five times for 28 yards and caught a pass for 11. Quarterback Andy Dalton finished the possession with a 4-yard scoring pass to tight end Jermaine Gresham, his first postseason touchdown pass in three playoff games. After a San Diego three-and-out, the Bengals appeared to gain momentum with Dalton's 49-yard completion to receiver Marvin Jones. But on the next play, linebacker Donald Butler forced a fumble from Bernard that Richard Marshall recovered for the Chargers in the end zone and returned 13 yards to the 11-yard line. San Diego was forced into a three-and-out again, and Cincinnati got the ball back on their own 32-yard line with 1:14 left in the half. Dalton subsequently completed three passes for 41 yards to set up Mike Nugent's 46-yard field goal, giving the Bengals a 10–7 first half lead.

However, that was all Cincinnati accomplished as the Chargers took over in the second half. After forcing the Bengals to punt on their opening second half drive, Philip Rivers completed a 33-yard pass to Eddie Royal that set up his 4-yard touchdown toss to Green, giving the Chargers the lead at 14–10. Then Dalton lost a fumble at the end of a 12-yard run without being touched, and Jahleel Addae recovered for San Diego on the Bengals' 46-yard line. The Chargers then drove 40 yards in nine plays to go up 17–10 with Nick Novak's 25-yard field goal. Then after two plays on the Bengals next drive, cornerback Shareece Wright intercepted a pass from Dalton and returned it 30 yards to the Cincinnati 3-yard line, setting up another Novak field goal that made the score 20–10. Dalton threw another interception on the ensuing possession, this one to linebacker Melvin Ingram. Although the Chargers would not convert this one into points, the Chargers' defense would go on to pin down the Bengals for the rest of the game. For their final three drives, they turned the ball over on downs twice in Chargers territory, while their final drive ended as time expired on the Chargers' 6-yard line. Meanwhile, a 58-yard touchdown run by San Diego running back Ronnie Brown made the final score 27–10.

Rivers finished the day 12-for-18 for 128 yards and a touchdown, with no interceptions. Dalton finished 29-for-51 for 334 yards and a touchdown – and rushed for 26 yards – but was intercepted twice and lost a fumble. Bernard rushed for 45 yards and caught seven passes for 73. Jones caught eight passes for 130 yards, setting a postseason franchise record and making him the first Bengals player to have over 100 receiving yards in a playoff game since Cris Collinsworth in the 1983 season. Bengals receiver A. J. Green, who had 1,426 receiving yards during the season, finished the game with just three catches for 34 yards. It was the last postseason win for the Chargers, before relocating back to Los Angeles in 2017.

This was the second postseason meeting between the Chargers and Bengals. Cincinnati won the previous meeting 27–7 in the 1981 AFC Championship Game, also played in Cincinnati and known as the "Freezer Bowl".

==== NFC: San Francisco 49ers 23, Green Bay Packers 20 ====
San Francisco 49ers vs. Green Bay Packers – Game summary

Quarter	1	2	3	4	Total
49ers	6	7	0	10	23
Packers	0	10	0	10	20

at Lambeau Field, Green Bay, Wisconsin

- Date: January 5
- Game time: 4:40 pm EST/3:40 p.m. CST/1:40 pm PST
- Game weather: 5 °F (−15 °C), mostly cloudy
- Game attendance: 77,525
- Referee: Ed Hochuli
- TV announcers (Fox): Joe Buck (play-by-play), Troy Aikman (color commentator), Pam Oliver, and Erin Andrews (sideline reporters)
- Recap, Game book

Game information

1st quarter

- SF – Phil Dawson 22-yard field goal, 9:00. 49ers 3–0. Drive: 13 plays, 69 yards, 4:28.
- SF – Phil Dawson 25-yard field goal, 2:17. 49ers 6–0. Drive: 11 plays, 42 yards, 4:49.

2nd quarter

- GB – Jordy Nelson 5-yard pass from Aaron Rodgers (Mason Crosby kick), 5:50. Packers 7–6. Drive: 14 plays, 70 yards, 7:18.
- SF – Frank Gore 10-yard run (Phil Dawson kick), 2:48. 49ers 13–7. Drive: 5 plays, 68 yards, 3:02.
- GB – Mason Crosby 34-yard field goal, 0:00. 49ers 13–10. Drive: 9 plays, 59 yards, 2:48.

3rd quarter

- None.

4th quarter

- GB – John Kuhn 1-yard run (Mason Crosby kick), 12:06. Packers 17–13. Drive: 12 plays, 80 yards, 6:13.
- SF – Vernon Davis 28-yard pass from Colin Kaepernick (Phil Dawson kick), 10:31. 49ers 20–17. Drive: 4 plays, 63 yards, 1:35.
- GB – Mason Crosby 24-yard field goal, 5:06. Tied 20–20. Drive: 11 plays, 61 yards, 5:25.
- SF – Phil Dawson 33-yard field goal, 0:00. 49ers 23–20. Drive: 14 plays, 65 yards, 5:06.

Leading passers

- SF – Colin Kaepernick – 16/30, 227 yards, 1 TD, 1 INT
- GB – Aaron Rodgers – 17/26, 177 yards, 1 TD

Leading rushers

- SF – Colin Kaepernick – 7 rushes, 98 yards
- GB – Eddie Lacy – 21 rushes, 81 yards

Leading receivers

- SF – Michael Crabtree – 8 rec, 125 yards
- GB – Jordy Nelson – 7 rec, 62 yards, 1 TD

In the previous postseason, 49ers quarterback Colin Kaepernick had shredded the Packers for 444 total yards of offense, including 181 rushing yards. This time, they managed to contain him a little better, but the final result was still the same: a Green Bay loss. Kaepernick racked up 325 offensive yards, and with five minutes left, he led the team on a 65-yard drive to set up Phil Dawson's game-winning field goal.

Due to the 2014 North American cold wave, the game was initially expected to be one of the coldest playoff games in NFL history. But with a temperature of 5 °F (−15 °C) at kickoff time, it was warmer than the record −9 °F (−23 °C) set during the 1981 AFC Championship Game.

After the Packers punted on their opening drive, San Francisco started off the scoring with a 69-yard drive, featuring a 31-yard completion from Kaepernick to Michael Crabtree, that ended with Dawson's 22-yard field goal. Green Bay was subsequently forced to punt again, and Tim Masthay's kick went just 29 yards to the Packers' 49-yard line. Frank Gore rushed four times for 21 yards for the 49ers as they drove 42 yards to go up 6–0 on Dawson's second field goal.

The Packers were forced to a three-and-out on their next drive, but this time their defense managed to step up and make a big play. Early in the second quarter, cornerback Tramon Williams intercepted the ball from Kaepernick and returned it 17 yards to the Green Bay 30-yard line. After the turnover, Green Bay quarterback Aaron Rodgers completed six of seven passes for 45 yards as the team went 70 yards and 14 plays on a drive in which they never gained more than nine yards on a single play. Rodgers capped it off with a 5-yard touchdown pass to Jordy Nelson that gave the Packers a 7–6 lead. In a notable contrast, the 49ers quickly struck back, scoring with just five plays as Kaepernick took off for a 42-yard gallop to set up Gore's touchdown on a 10-yard run. Green Bay responded with Rodgers completing a 19-yard pass to Nelson and a 13-yarder to running back James Starks on a 59-yard drive that ended with Mason Crosby's 34-yard field goal as time expired in the half, making the score 13–10 at halftime.

San Francisco drove to the Green Bay 25-yard line on the first drive of the second half, but on third down, linebacker Nick Perry sacked Kaepernick for an 8-yard loss and the 49ers decided to punt rather than attempt a long field goal. Following one more punt from each team, Rodgers led the Packers on an 80-yard drive to take a 17–13 lead on fullback John Kuhn's 1-yard touchdown run. The highlight of the drive was a fourth down conversion in which Rodgers managed to power out of a tackle attempt and throw a pass to Randall Cobb for a 26-yard gain. However, like Green Bay's earlier touchdown, the 49ers quickly struck back, starting with LaMichael James' 37-yard kickoff return to the 37-yard line. Kaepernick then broke off a 24-yard run and soon finished the drive with a 28-yard touchdown pass to tight end Vernon Davis, retaking the lead for the 49ers at 20–17.

Taking the ball back with just over 10 minutes left in regulation, Rodgers led the Packers back with four completions for 46 yards, including a 25-yard pass to Cobb. Crosby finished the drive with a 24-yard field goal, re-tying the game with 5:16 to go. But this was matched by the 49ers, who drove 65 yards for the game-winning score. Kaepernick completed three passes for 39 yards along the way, two for 28 to Crabtree, and also rushed for 11. Gore also played a key role, rushing five times for 15 yards, including four consecutive carries that forced Green Bay to use up all their timeouts. With three seconds left, Dawson managed to narrowly get his 33-yard field goal inside the right upright to give the 49ers a 23–20 win.

Rodgers finished the day 17-for-26 for 177 yards and a touchdown, along with 11 rushing yards. Kaepernick completed 16 of 30 passes for 227 yards and a touchdown, with one interception; he also rushed seven times for 98 yards. Crabtree was the leading receiver of the game with eight receptions for 125 yards, while 49ers linebacker Ahmad Brooks had six tackles, two sacks, and a forced fumble.

This was the seventh postseason meeting between the 49ers and Packers, and was their second consecutive postseason meeting. Green Bay previously won four of the prior six meetings. San Francisco won 45–31 in the 2012 NFC Divisional playoffs.

== Divisional round ==
=== Saturday, January 11, 2014 ===
==== NFC: Seattle Seahawks 23, New Orleans Saints 15 ====
New Orleans Saints vs. Seattle Seahawks – Game summary

Quarter	1	2	3	4	Total
Saints	0	0	0	15	15
Seahawks	6	10	0	7	23

at CenturyLink Field, Seattle, Washington

- Date: January 11
- Game time: 4:35 pm EST/3:35 p.m. CST/1:35 pm PST
- Game weather: 48 °F (9 °C), rainy
- Game attendance: 68,388
- Referee: Terry McAulay
- TV announcers (Fox): Kevin Burkhardt (play-by-play), John Lynch (color commentator), and Erin Andrews (sideline reporter)
- Recap, Game book

Game information

1st quarter

- SEA – Steven Hauschka 38-yard field goal, 10:19. Seahawks 3–0. Drive: 6 plays, 20 yards, 3:20.
- SEA – Steven Hauschka 49-yard field goal, 0:37. Seahawks 6–0. Drive: 9 plays, 34 yards, 4:26.

2nd quarter

- SEA – Marshawn Lynch 15-yard run (Steven Hauschka kick), 14:17. Seahawks 13–0. Drive: 2 plays, 24 yards, 0:34.
- SEA – Steven Hauschka 26-yard field goal, 1:18. Seahawks 16–0. Drive: 12 plays, 63 yards, 4:44.

3rd quarter

- None.

4th quarter

- NO – Khiry Robinson 1-yard run (2-pt conv. – Mark Ingram II run), 13:11. Seahawks 16–8. Drive: 9 plays, 74 yards, 4:27.
- SEA – Marshawn Lynch 31-yard run (Steven Hauschka kick), 2:40. Seahawks 23–8. Drive: 4 plays, 62 yards, 1:11.
- NO – Marques Colston 9-yard pass from Drew Brees (Shayne Graham kick), 0:26. Seahawks 23–15. Drive: 9 plays, 80 yards, 2:14.

Leading passers

- NO – Drew Brees – 24/43, 309 yards, 1 TD
- SEA – Russell Wilson – 9/18, 103 yards

Leading rushers

- NO – Khiry Robinson – 13 rushes, 57 yards, 1 TD
- SEA – Marshawn Lynch – 28 rushes, 140 yards, 2 TD

Leading receivers

- NO – Marques Colston – 11 rec, 144 yards, 1 TD
- SEA – Doug Baldwin – 2 rec, 30 yards

The last time these two teams met in the playoffs, Seattle running back Marshawn Lynch had rushed for 131 yards and a touchdown in a winning effort. This time, Lynch rushed for 140 yards and two scores to help the Seahawks advance to their second NFC Championship Game since 2005, despite quarterback Russell Wilson only completing nine of 18 passes for 108 yards. This was the Seahawks' fifth consecutive home playoff win, as they have not lost at home in the playoffs since being defeated by the St. Louis Rams in 2004.

The Seahawks dominated the first half, jumping to a 16–0 lead while holding Saints quarterback Drew Brees, who had passed for over 5,000 yards during the season, to just 34 yards. New Orleans was forced to punt on their opening drive, and punter Thomas Morstead bobbled the rain-soaked ball at the snap before shanking a 16-yard kick that gave Seattle a first down on the Saints' 40-yard line. The Seahawks then drove 20 yards, aided by a penalty for unnecessary roughness on safety Rafael Bush, and took a 3–0 lead on Steven Hauschka's 38-yard field goal. New Orleans responded with a drive to the Seattle 27-yard line, but Shayne Graham missed a 47-yard field goal attempt. Seattle then drove 34 yards and increased their lead to 6–0 with Hauschka's second field goal, this one from 49 yards out with 37 seconds left in the first quarter.

On the first play of the second quarter, defensive end Michael Bennett forced and recovered a fumble by New Orleans running back Mark Ingram II on the Saints' 24-yard line. Following a 9-yard run by Percy Harvin, Lynch scored on a 15-yard touchdown carry to increase Seattle's lead to 13–0. Later on, the Saints got a scoring opportunity when Jon Ryan's 24-yard punt gave them a first down on the Seahawks' 48-yard line. But they could only get to the 29-yard line, and on fourth down and 4, linebacker Bobby Wagner ended the drive by breaking up Brees' pass. On the Seahawks' ensuing drive, Lynch broke off an 18-yard run, while Wilson completed a 16-yard pass to Harvin and rushed for 25 yards himself, as the team drove 68 yards to take a 16–0 first-half lead on Hauschka's third field goal.

On the Saints' first drive of the second half, they managed to reach the Seahawks 34-yard line. But once again they failed to score as Bennett and Cliff Avril sacked Brees for a 10-yard loss on third down, pushing New Orleans out of field goal range. The Saints built some momentum towards the end of the quarter, on Brees' 23-yard completion to reserve tight end Josh Hill. On the next play, Brees' 25-yard completion to Marques Colston gave the team a first down on the Seattle 14-yard line, and they eventually scored with Khiry Robinson's 1-yard touchdown run. Ingram ran for a successful 2-point conversion, cutting their deficit to 16–8 early in the fourth quarter. New Orleans then forced a punt and seemed primed to score again when Brees completed a 30-yard pass to Kenny Stills from the Saints' 42-yard line; the play was negated by a holding penalty on offensive tackle Zach Strief, forcing a punt. By the time they got the ball back again, only 5:31 remained. They subsequently drove to the Seattle 30-yard line, but Graham missed a 48-yard field goal, giving the ball back to the Seahawks with 3:51 to go.

Faced with third down and 3 after their first two plays, Wilson managed to complete a 24-yard pass to Doug Baldwin for a first down. On the next play, Lynch took off for a 31-yard touchdown run, giving the Seahawks a 23–8 lead. Brees completed six of eight passes as he led his team down the field 80 yards in nine plays, the last coming on fourth down and six from the Seahawks' nine-yard line when he found Colston in the end zone for a touchdown. Graham kicked the extra point to pull New Orleans within eight with twenty-six seconds remaining. On the subsequent kickoff, Graham's onside kick was bobbled by Seattle receiver Golden Tate at the Saints' 42-yard line, allowing Colston to recover for New Orleans, at the 41-yard line. On the first play of the drive, Brees found tight end Jimmy Graham for eight yards, then spiked the ball to stop the clock.

On the next play, Brees found Colston along the sideline at the Seattle 38-yard line. Instead of running out of bounds to stop the clock and give the Saints one more chance, Colston turned back toward the field of play and attempted to keep the play going by relaying the ball across the field to teammate Travaris Cadet. However, the throw by Colston to Cadet was forward – not a lateral – resulting in an illegal-forward-pass penalty which included a game-ending runoff, and the Seahawks won, 23–15. Brees finished the game with 309 passing yards and a touchdown. Colston caught 11 passes for 144 yards and a score. Bennett had six tackles, half a sack, two forced fumbles, and a fumble recovery.

This was the second postseason meeting between the Saints and Seahawks, where Seattle won the last meeting 41–36 which is best remembered for Marshawn Lynch's "Beast Quake" run in the 2010 NFC Wild Card playoffs.

==== AFC: New England Patriots 43, Indianapolis Colts 22 ====
Indianapolis Colts vs. New England Patriots – Game summary

Quarter	1	2	3	4	Total
Colts	7	5	10	0	22
Patriots	14	7	8	14	43

at Gillette Stadium, Foxborough, Massachusetts

- Date: January 11
- Game time: 8:15 pm EST/5:15 pm PST
- Game weather: 57 °F (14 °C), rainy and windy
- Game attendance: 68,756
- Referee: Pete Morelli
- TV announcers (CBS): Greg Gumbel (play-by-play), Dan Dierdorf (color commentator), and Allie LaForce (sideline reporter)
- Recap, Game book

Game information

1st quarter

- NE – LeGarrette Blount 2-yard run (Stephen Gostkowski kick), 13:41. Patriots 7–0. Drive: 1 play, 2 yards, 0:04.
- NE – LeGarrette Blount 2-yard run (Stephen Gostkowski kick), 7:17. Patriots 14–0. Drive: 10 plays, 74 yards, 5:03.
- IND – LaVon Brazill 38-yard pass from Andrew Luck (Adam Vinatieri kick), 4:35. Patriots 14–7. Drive: 7 plays, 80 yards, 2:42.

2nd quarter

- NE – LeGarrette Blount 2-yard run (Stephen Gostkowski kick), 10:54. Patriots 21–7. Drive: 14 plays, 75 yards, 6:28.
- IND – Adam Vinatieri 36-yard field goal, 5:35. Patriots 21–10. Drive: 11 plays, 62 yds, 5:19.
- IND – Ryan Allen fumble declared dead in endzone for a safety, 2:18. Patriots 21–12.

3rd quarter

- IND – Adam Vinatieri 21-yard field goal, 10:03. Patriots 21–15. Drive: 8 plays, 60 yards, 3:27.
- NE – Stevan Ridley 3-yard run (2-pt conv. – Stevan Ridley run), 6:18. Patriots 29–15. Drive: 9 plays, 88 yards, 3:45.
- IND – LaVon Brazill 35-yard pass from Andrew Luck (Adam Vinatieri kick), 5:01. Patriots 29–22. Drive: 3 plays, 80 yards, 1:17.

4th quarter

- NE – LeGarrette Blount 73-yard run (Stephen Gostkowski kick), 12:55. Patriots 36–22. Drive: 1 play, 73 yards, 0:13.
- NE – Stevan Ridley 1-yard run (Stephen Gostkowski kick), 11:12. Patriots 43–22. Drive: 5 plays, 18 yards, 1:33.

Leading passers

- IND – Andrew Luck – 20/41, 331 yards, 2 TD, 4 INT
- NE – Tom Brady – 13/25, 198 yards

Leading rushers

- IND – Donald Brown – 17 rushes, 63 yards
- NE – LeGarrette Blount – 24 rushes, 166 yards, 4 TD

Leading receivers

- IND – T. Y. Hilton – 4 rec, 103 yards
- NE – Julian Edelman – 6 rec, 84 yards

New England intercepted four passes, rushed for 234 yards, and scored six rushing touchdowns – the second highest total in postseason history – as they advanced to their eighth conference championship game in the last 13 years.

The Patriots took a 7–0 lead just 1:15 into the game after Alfonzo Dennard intercepted a pass from Colts quarterback Andrew Luck on the third play of the game and returned it 27 yards to the Indianapolis 2-yard line. On the next play, LeGarrette Blount ran the ball into the end zone for a score. Then after an Indianapolis punt, Tom Brady completed a 25-yard pass to Julian Edelman and a 16-yarder to Danny Amendola as the Patriots drove 74 yards to increase their lead to 14–0 on Blount's second 2-yard touchdown run of the first quarter. This time, the Colts managed to respond. Faced with third and 6 on their ensuing drive, Luck converted the down with a 22-yard pass to Griff Whalen, and then threw a 38-yard touchdown pass to receiver LaVon Brazill on the next play, cutting the score to 14–7.

Early in the second quarter, Edelman caught passes for gains of 27 and 13 yards as the team drove 75 yards to up the score to 21–7 with Blount's third 2-yard touchdown run of the half. Luck countered with a 29-yard completion to tight end Coby Fleener that set up Adam Vinatieri's 36-yard field goal. Then the Colts caught a break when a high snap sailed over the head of Patriots punter Ryan Allen. Allen recovered the ball on his own 1-yard line, but fumbled it while being tackled by Kelvin Sheppard. The ball went through the end zone for a safety, making the score 21–12. To make matters worse for New England, Allen was knocked out of the game on the play; kicker Stephen Gostkowski replaced Allen for the rest of the game. After the free kick, Indianapolis drove to the Patriots' 39-yard line, but linebacker Dont'a Hightower ended the drive by intercepting Luck with 1:14 left in the half.

After the Patriots punted on the opening drive of the second half, Luck's completions to T. Y. Hilton and Fleener for gains of 40 and 16 yards set up Vinatieri's 21-yard field goal, cutting their deficit to 21–15. But this was as close as they would get for the rest of the game. On the Patriots' ensuing drive, Brady's 53-yard completion to Amendola moved the ball to the Colts' 32-yard line, and they eventually scored on a 1-yard touchdown run by Stevan Ridley; he added a two-point conversion, increasing New England's lead to 29–15. Indianapolis struck back quickly with Luck completing a 46-yard pass to Hilton and a 37-yard touchdown pass to Brazill.

However, the Patriots quickly dashed the Colts' comeback hopes early in the fourth quarter. With 13:08 left in the game, Blount broke through the line and took off for a 73-yard touchdown run, putting New England back up by 14 points at 36–22. Then New England linebacker Jamie Collins intercepted a pass from Luck and returned it 20 yards to the Colts' 18-yard line, and they scored another touchdown on a 1-yard rush by Ridley. Indianapolis was forced into a three-and-out on their next drive, enabling New England to get the ball back and run almost eight minutes off the clock, aided by Blount's 30-yard run. By the time the Colts got the ball back, only 2:34 remained. Then Dennard sealed the win by recording his second interception from Luck on Indianapolis' final play.

Blount tied a franchise playoff record with 166 rushing yards, and set a franchise record with four rushing touchdowns. He also returned two kickoffs for 37 yards. Ridley rushed for 52 yards and two touchdowns, while Brady threw for 198 yards, making it the first time he did not throw nor score a touchdown in a playoff game since the 2001 AFC Championship Game. His top target was Edelman, who caught six passes for 84 yards. Luck threw for 331 yards and two touchdowns, but completed only 20 of 41 passes and was intercepted four times. Hilton caught four passes for 103 yards.

This was the fourth postseason meeting between the Colts and Patriots. The Patriots won two of the first three meetings, where the winner of each prior meeting won the Super Bowl. The Colts won the last meeting 38–34 in the 2006 AFC Championship Game.

=== Sunday, January 12, 2014 ===
==== NFC: San Francisco 49ers 23, Carolina Panthers 10 ====
San Francisco 49ers vs. Carolina Panthers – Game summary

Quarter	1	2	3	4	Total
49ers	6	7	7	3	23
Panthers	0	10	0	0	10

at Bank of America Stadium, Charlotte, North Carolina

- Date: January 12
- Game time: 1:05 pm EST/10:05 am PST
- Game weather: 54 °F (12 °C), sunny
- Game attendance: 73,784
- Referee: Carl Cheffers
- TV announcers (Fox): Joe Buck (play-by-play), Troy Aikman (color commentator), and Pam Oliver (sideline reporter)
- Recap, Game book

Game information

1st quarter

- SF – Phil Dawson 49-yard field goal, 9:12. 49ers 3–0. Drive: 13 plays, 49 yards, 5:48.
- SF – Phil Dawson 33-yard field goal, 4:33. 49ers 6–0. Drive: 6 plays, 31 yards, 1:44.

2nd quarter

- CAR – Steve Smith 31-yard pass from Cam Newton (Graham Gano kick), 13:40. Panthers 7–6. Drive: 1 play, 31 yards, 0:07.
- CAR – Graham Gano 24-yard field goal, 3:41. Panthers 10–6. Drive: 13 plays, 73 yards, 8:59.
- SF – Vernon Davis 1-yard pass from Colin Kaepernick (Phil Dawson kick), 0:05. 49ers 13–10. Drive: 12 plays, 80 yards, 3:36.

3rd quarter

- SF – Colin Kaepernick 4-yard run (Phil Dawson kick), 8:53. 49ers 20–10. Drive: 8 plays, 77 yards, 4:32.

4th quarter

- SF – Phil Dawson 34-yard field goal, 7:41. 49ers 23–10. Drive: 13 plays, 73 yards, 7:52.

Leading passers

- SF – Colin Kaepernick – 15/28, 196 yards, 1 TD
- CAR – Cam Newton – 16/25, 267 yards, 1 TD, 2 INT

Leading rushers

- SF – Frank Gore – 17 rushes, 84 yards
- CAR – Cam Newton – 10 rushes, 54 yards

Leading receivers

- SF – Anquan Boldin – 8 rec, 136 yards
- CAR – Ted Ginn Jr. – 4 rec, 104 yards

San Francisco recovered from a 10–6 first half deficit by intercepting Panthers quarterback Cam Newton twice, sacking him four times, while scoring 17 unanswered points to earn their third consecutive trip to the NFC Championship Game. With the win, the 49ers became the first team since the 1977 Minnesota Vikings to return to the NFC Championship Game after being defeated in the Super Bowl the previous year.

A 23-yard completion from 49ers quarterback Colin Kaepernick to rookie receiver Quinton Patton helped the team advance to the Panthers' 24-yard line on their opening drive. But on third down, Kaepernick was sacked for a 7-yard loss by linebacker Luke Kuechly, forcing the team to settle for Phil Dawson's 49-yard field goal. Then on Carolina's next drive, Newton was intercepted by linebacker Patrick Willis on the Panthers' 46-yard line, and the 49ers converted the turnover into another Dawson field goal to take a 6–0 lead. Carolina took the ball back and drove 65 yards to the 49ers' 1-yard line, only to turn the ball over on downs when Newton was stopped short on the first play of the second quarter. But the Panthers' defense forced the 49ers to punt after three plays, and Ted Ginn Jr. returned the ball 24 yards to the San Francisco 31-yard line. On the next play, Newton completed a deep pass down the left side of the field for a 31-yard touchdown completion to receiver Steve Smith, giving the Panthers their first lead, 7–6.

San Francisco was forced to punt again on their ensuing possession, and Newton led the Panthers back for more points. After rushing twice for 17 yards, Newton's 35-yard completion to tight end Greg Olsen gave them a first down on the 49ers' 20-yard line. The drive stalled at the 7-yard line, where Graham Gano kicked a 24-yard field goal to give the team a 10–6 lead with 3:41 left in the half. But Kaepernick rallied the 49ers back, completing three passes to Anquan Boldin for 42 yards and a 20-yarder to Michael Crabtree. With just 14 seconds left, he finished the drive with a 1-yard touchdown pass to tight end Vernon Davis in the right corner of the end zone. Davis was ruled out of bounds when he made the catch, but a replay review showed he had both feet in bounds before stepping out and the call was overturned. With his touchdown, the teams went into their locker rooms at halftime with San Francisco leading 13–10.

In the second half, San Francisco completely took over; after Carolina punted on the opening drive, Kaepernick completed passes to Boldin for gains of 16 and 45 yards as the 49ers drove 77 yards and got into the end zone on Kaepernick's 4-yard run. Then after a long Panthers drive ended on the 49ers' 37-yard line with a punt, San Francisco running back Frank Gore's 39-yard burst set up a 34-yard field goal by Dawson, giving the 49ers a 23–10 lead with 7:35 left in the fourth quarter. Carolina responded with a drive to the San Francisco 28-yard line, but safety Donte Whitner intercepted a pass from Newton to prevent any scoring. After the turnover, the 49ers put the game away with a possession that ran the clock down to 12 seconds.

Kaepernick completed 15 of 28 passes for 196 yards and a touchdown, while also rushing for 15 yards and a score. Nearly all of his passing production came from Boldin, who caught eight passes for 136 yards. Gore added 84 rushing yards, while linebacker Ahmad Brooks had six tackles and 2.5 sacks. Willis had 11 tackles – five of which were solo tackles – and an interception. Newton finished his first playoff game 16-for-25 for 267 yards and a touchdown, with two interceptions. He also had 10 carries for 54 yards. Ginn caught four passes for 104 yards, returned two punts for 26 yards, and had 80 yards returning kickoffs.

This was the first postseason meeting between the 49ers and Panthers.

==== AFC: Denver Broncos 24, San Diego Chargers 17 ====
San Diego Chargers vs. Denver Broncos – Game summary

Quarter	1	2	3	4	Total
Chargers	0	0	0	17	17
Broncos	7	7	3	7	24

at Sports Authority Field at Mile High, Denver, Colorado

- Date: January 12
- Game time: 4:40 pm EST/2:40 p.m. MST/1:40 pm PST
- Game weather: 41 °F (5 °C), partly cloudy
- Game attendance: 76,969
- Referee: Clete Blakeman
- TV announcers (CBS): Jim Nantz (play-by-play), Phil Simms (color commentator), and Tracy Wolfson (sideline reporter)
- Recap, Game book

Game information

1st quarter

- DEN – Demaryius Thomas 2-yard pass from Peyton Manning (Matt Prater kick), 2:25. Broncos 7–0. Drive: 14 plays, 86 yards, 7:01.

2nd quarter

- DEN – Wes Welker 3-yard pass from Peyton Manning (Matt Prater kick), 6:00. Broncos 14–0. Drive: 9 plays, 57 yards, 5:13.

3rd quarter

- DEN – Matt Prater 45-yard field goal, 9:35. Broncos 17–0. Drive: 12 plays, 37 yards, 5:25.

4th quarter

- SD – Keenan Allen 16-yard pass from Philip Rivers (Nick Novak kick), 12:59. Broncos 17–7. Drive: 6 plays, 63 yards, 3:08.
- DEN – Knowshon Moreno 3-yard run (Matt Prater kick), 8:12. Broncos 24–7. Drive: 9 plays, 81 yards, 4:47.
- SD – Keenan Allen 16-yard pass from Philip Rivers (Nick Novak kick), 5:43. Broncos 24–14. Drive: 7 plays, 80 yards, 2:29.
- SD – Nick Novak 30-yard field goal, 3:53. Broncos 24–17. Drive: 8 plays, 48 yards, 1:50.

Leading passers

- SD – Philip Rivers – 18/27, 217 yards, 2 TD
- DEN – Peyton Manning – 25/36, 230 yards, 2 TD, 1 INT

Leading rushers

- SD – Danny Woodhead – 9 rushes, 29 yards
- DEN – Knowshon Moreno – 23 rushes, 82 yards, 1 TD

Leading receivers

- SD – Keenan Allen – 6 rec, 142 yards, 2 TD
- DEN – Julius Thomas – 6 rec, 76 yards

Denver jumped out to a 17–0 lead and held off a late San Diego rally to prevail 24–17 and advance to their first AFC Championship Game since 2005, running the final four minutes off the clock with a 10-play drive that included three third down conversions.

After San Diego punted on their first drive, Denver opened the scoring on their first possession with a 14-play, 86-yard drive in which Peyton Manning completed five passes to four different receivers, the last a 2-yard touchdown completion to Demaryius Thomas. Denver crossed into San Diego territory again on their second possession, but the Chargers got the ball back when rookie safety Jahleel Addae recovered a fumble from tight end Julius Thomas. They were unable to convert the turnover into points, however, when Nick Novak missed a 53-yard field goal attempt. Taking the ball back on their 43, Denver drove 57 yards, mainly on plays from running backs Knowshon Moreno and Montee Ball. Both of them rushed three times for 21 yards each on the drive, while Moreno caught a pass for 12. Manning finished the drive with a 3-yard touchdown pass to Wes Welker to put the Broncos up 14–0 with six minutes left in the second quarter.

Following another Chargers punt, Broncos returner Eric Decker broke several tackles as he ran the ball back 47 yards, but tripped himself to the ground without being touched at the San Diego 30-yard line. The Broncos then drove to the 4-yard line; on third down, Manning threw a pass to Decker in the end zone, but linebacker Darrell Stuckey knocked the ball from Decker's grasp and Donald Butler managed to intercept it near the back of the goal line. It was the first red zone interception thrown by Manning all season. Denver kick returner Trindon Holliday ran the second half kickoff 37 yards to the 36-yard line, setting up a 47-yard drive that ended with Matt Prater's 45-yard field goal, increasing the team's lead to 17–0. On their next drive, the Broncos drove to the San Diego 29-yard line but this time Prater missed from 47 yards, his first miss of the season from under 50.

The Chargers finally got on the board in the fourth quarter, with Philip Rivers completing a 30-yard pass to Eddie Royal and then finding Keenan Allen for a 16-yard touchdown. On the ensuing kickoff, Holliday returned the kick 105 yards for a touchdown, but an illegal block in the back penalty called it back. Later in their drive, the Broncos were helped by a 23-yard pass interference call on Marcus Gilchrist on third down, and they eventually scored on Moreno's 3-yard run to take a 24–7 lead with just over eight minutes left in the game. On the next drive the Chargers faced a fourth and 5 from their own 25 and converted on a 49-yard pass to Allen. Three plays later Rivers found Allen again for a 16-yard touchdown to cut the deficit to 24–14. The Chargers then attempted an onside kick which bounced off Decker's hands and was recovered by Richard Marshall. Rivers completed 17 and 25-yard passes to Allen to get into the Denver red zone, but the drive stalled and the Chargers settled for a Novak 30-yard field goal. Taking possession with 3:53 remaining, Denver converted a third and 17 with a Manning 21-yard pass to Julius Thomas, then converted a third and 6 with a 9-yard pass to Thomas later in the drive. Shortly after the two-minute warning, Moreno converted a third and 1 with a 5-yard run, enabling Denver to run out the rest of the clock.

Manning finished 25-for-36 for 230 yards, two touchdowns and an interception. Rivers finished with 217 yards and two touchdowns, 173 of which came in the fourth quarter. Allen finished with six receptions and 142 yards with two touchdowns, becoming the first rookie wide receiver since 1992 to have 100+ yards and two touchdowns in a playoff game. Moreno had 84 yards and a touchdown, along with a 12-yard reception, while Ball added 10 carries for 52 yards. It was the last playoff game for the Chargers before moving to Los Angeles in 2017.

This was the first postseason meeting between the Chargers and Broncos.

== Conference championships ==
=== Sunday, January 19, 2014 ===
==== AFC: Denver Broncos 26, New England Patriots 16 ====
New England Patriots vs. Denver Broncos – Game summary

Quarter	1	2	3	4	Total
Patriots	0	3	0	13	16
Broncos	3	10	7	6	26

at Sports Authority Field at Mile High, Denver, Colorado

- Date: January 19
- Game time: 3:00 pm EST/1:00 p.m. MST/12 noon PST
- Game weather: 63 °F (17 °C), sunny
- Game attendance: 77,110
- Referee: Tony Corrente
- TV announcers (CBS): Jim Nantz (play-by-play), Phil Simms (color commentator), and Tracy Wolfson (sideline reporter)
- Recap, Game book

Game information

1st quarter

- DEN – Matt Prater 27-yard field goal, 3:43. Broncos 3–0. Drive: 10 plays, 73 yards, 4:07.

2nd quarter

- DEN – Jacob Tamme 1-yard pass from Peyton Manning (Matt Prater kick), 7:50. Broncos 10–0. Drive: 15 plays, 93 yards, 7:01.
- NE – Stephen Gostkowski 47-yard field goal, 2:54. Broncos 10–3. Drive: 9 plays, 51 yards, 4:56.
- DEN – Matt Prater 35-yard field goal, 0:25. Broncos 13–3. Drive: 8 plays, 63 yards, 2:29.

3rd quarter

- DEN – Demaryius Thomas 3-yard pass from Peyton Manning (Matt Prater kick), 7:52. Broncos 20–3. Drive: 13 plays, 80 yards, 7:08.

4th quarter

- DEN – Matt Prater 19-yard field goal, 12:02. Broncos 23–3. Drive: 9 plays, 60 yards, 5:23.
- NE – Julian Edelman 7-yard pass from Tom Brady (Stephen Gostkowski kick), 9:26. Broncos 23–10. Drive: 9 plays, 80 yards, 2:36.
- DEN – Matt Prater 54-yard field goal, 7:00. Broncos 26–10. Drive: 6 plays, 39 yards, 2:26.
- NE – Tom Brady 5-yard run (2-pt conv. – run failed), 3:07. Broncos 26–16. Drive: 10 plays, 80 yards, 3:53.

Leading passers

- NE – Tom Brady – 24/38, 277 yards, 1 TD
- DEN – Peyton Manning – 32/43, 400 yards, 2 TD

Leading rushers

- NE – Shane Vereen – 4 rushes, 34 yards
- DEN – Knowshon Moreno – 14 rushes, 59 yards

Leading receivers

- NE – Julian Edelman – 10 rec, 89 yards, 1 TD
- DEN – Demaryius Thomas – 7 rec, 134 yards, 1 TD

For the first time since 2006, the Patriots played on the road in the playoffs, which was also the last time they faced Peyton Manning when he was with the Colts. But the story was all about Denver as their offense racked up 507 yards without turning the ball over or giving up any sacks as they advanced to their seventh Super Bowl in franchise history, avenging a Week 12 defeat in which the Patriots rallied from a 24–0 halftime deficit. Manning set a conference championship record with 32 completions for 400 yards and two touchdowns. The team also got a big performance from receiver Demaryius Thomas, who caught seven passes for 134 yards and a touchdown, and kicker Matt Prater, who made four field goals. The win was especially satisfying for head coach John Fox, who lost to Tom Brady and Bill Belichick in Super Bowl XXXVIII 10 years earlier when he was with the Carolina Panthers.

Midway through the first quarter, Manning got the Broncos into scoring range with an 18-yard completion to Knowshon Moreno, a 29-yard pass to Thomas, and a 19-yarder to Eric Decker. Prater finished the drive with a 27-yard field goal to put the team up 3–0. The next time Denver had the ball, they advanced 93 yards in 15 plays on a drive that took up nearly half the second quarter. At one point they faced third and 10 from the Patriots' 39-yard line, and made the conversion with a 28-yard draw play by Moreno. Manning eventually got the team into the end zone with a 1-yard pass to tight end Jacob Tamme, making the score 10–0.

This time New England managed to respond, with Brady completing a 27-yard pass to receiver Aaron Dobson on the first play of their next drive; this ended up as Brady's longest completion of the game. The Patriots eventually reached the Broncos' 18-yard line, but Robert Ayers sacked Brady for an 11-yard loss on third down, forcing them to settle for Stephen Gostkowski's 47-yard field goal. Denver then took the ball back and drove for more points, as Manning hooked up with Thomas for a pair of completions that netted 53 yards. Prater finished things off with a 35-yard field goal, giving the team a 13–3 lead with 25 seconds left in the half.

Denver started out the second half with a long touchdown drive that took up almost the same amount of time (7:08) as their last one (7:01), moving the ball 80 yards in 13 plays. Manning completed seven of eight passes for 59 yards on the drive, the last a 3-yard touchdown toss to Thomas that increased Denver's lead to 20–3. New England responded with a drive to the Broncos' 29-yard line, but on a fourth and 2 conversion attempt, Brady was sacked for a 10-yard loss by nose tackle Terrance Knighton. Denver then took over and set up a drive for more points, with Manning completing two passes to tight end Julius Thomas for 28 yards and a completion to Demaryius Thomas for 30. New England managed to halt the drive at their own 1, but Prater kicked his third field goal to put Denver up 23–3.

New England finally scored a touchdown with just over nine minutes left in the fourth quarter. Starting the drive with an 18-yard pass to tight end Michael Hoomanawanui, Brady followed it up with completions to Austin Collie and Julian Edelman for gains of 20 and 16 yards. He eventually completed the drive with a 7-yard touchdown pass to Edelman, cutting the score to 23–10. However, Denver scored again with their next possession, with Manning's 37-yard completion to Julius Thomas setting up Prater's fourth field goal, this one from 54 yards.

New England now faced a 26–10 deficit with seven minutes left in regulation; Brady completed five of seven passes for 54 yards on their next drive, and took the ball into the end zone himself on a 5-yard run. However, their two-point conversion attempt failed, keeping the score 26–16. Then after Decker recovered New England's onside kick, Denver managed to run the final 3:07 off the clock with their last drive. Brady finished the day 24-for-38 for 277 yards and touchdown, along with two carries for seven yards and a score on the ground. Edelman caught 10 passes for 89 yards and a touchdown. Thomas had eight receptions for 85 yards for Denver, while Decker had five catches for 73.

This was the fourth postseason meeting between the Patriots and Broncos. Denver won two of the prior three meetings. New England won the last meeting 45–10 in the 2011 AFC Divisional playoffs.

==== NFC: Seattle Seahawks 23, San Francisco 49ers 17 ====
San Francisco 49ers vs. Seattle Seahawks – Game summary

Quarter	1	2	3	4	Total
49ers	3	7	7	0	17
Seahawks	0	3	10	10	23

at CenturyLink Field, Seattle, Washington

- Date: January 19
- Game time: 6:30 pm EST/3:30 pm PST
- Game weather: 43 °F (6 °C), cloudy
- Game attendance: 68,454
- Referee: Gene Steratore
- TV announcers (Fox): Joe Buck (play-by-play), Troy Aikman (color commentator), Pam Oliver, and Erin Andrews (sideline reporters)
- Recap, Game book

Game information

1st quarter

- SF – Phil Dawson 25-yard field goal, 12:45. 49ers 3–0. Drive: 4 plays, 8 yards, 2:05.

2nd quarter

- SF – Anthony Dixon 1-yard run (Phil Dawson kick), 10:03. 49ers 10–0. Drive: 9 plays, 86 yards, 4:46.
- SEA – Steven Hauschka 32-yard field goal, 5:47. 49ers 10–3. Drive: 9 plays, 62 yards, 4:16.

3rd quarter

- SEA – Marshawn Lynch 40-yard run (Steven Hauschka kick), 9:51. Tied 10–10. Drive: 4 plays, 60 yards, 2:15.
- SF – Anquan Boldin 26-yard pass from Colin Kaepernick (Phil Dawson kick), 6:29. 49ers 17–10. Drive: 6 plays, 83 yards, 3:22.
- SEA – Steven Hauschka 40-yard field goal, 3:55. 49ers 17–13. Drive: 5 plays, 11 yards, 2:34.

4th quarter

- SEA – Jermaine Kearse 35-yard pass from Russell Wilson (Steven Hauschka kick), 13:44. Seahawks 20–17. Drive: 8 plays, 62 yards, 4:03.
- SEA – Steven Hauschka 47-yard field goal, 3:37. Seahawks 23–17. Drive: 7 plays, 11 yards, 4:00.

Leading passers

- SF – Colin Kaepernick – 14/24, 153 yards, 1 TD, 2 INT
- SEA – Russell Wilson – 16/25, 215 yards, 1 TD

Leading rushers

- SF – Colin Kaepernick – 11 rushes, 130 yards
- SEA – Marshawn Lynch – 22 rushes, 109 yards, 1 TD

Leading receivers

- SF – Michael Crabtree – 4 rec, 52 yards
- SEA – Doug Baldwin – 6 rec, 106 yards

With 22 seconds left in regulation, Richard Sherman deflected a pass in the end zone into the arms of linebacker Malcolm Smith for a game clinching interception as San Francisco was trying to drive for a winning score.

Things got off to a rough start for the Seahawks as their quarterback Russell Wilson was sacked on the first play of the game by linebacker Aldon Smith, resulting in a fumble that was recovered on the Seattle 15-yard line. However, their defense managed to keep San Francisco out of the end zone, forcing them to settle for Phil Dawson's 25-yard field goal to take a 3–0 lead. There would be no more scoring until the second quarter, when 49ers quarterback Colin Kaepernick took off for a 58-yard run that gave the team a first down on the Seattle 10-yard line. Three plays later on fourth and goal, running back Anthony Dixon dove over the goal line pile to score a 1-yard touchdown run, increasing the lead to 10–0. This time, Seattle managed to respond with Wilson's 51-yard completion to Doug Baldwin leading to a 32-yard field goal by Steven Hauschka with just under six minutes left in the quarter. Near the end of the quarter, the 49ers appeared to have a chance to drive for points when Wilson threw an incomplete pass on fourth down from the 38-yard line with 20 seconds to go. Carlos Rogers was flagged for shoving receiver Golden Tate out of bounds after the incompletion, resulting in a penalty that pushed San Francisco back 15 yards and the team decided to run out the clock. Commentators Joe Buck and Troy Aikman both said they felt the penalty call was improper, as it appeared to be only a mild push.

San Francisco was forced to punt on their first drive of the second half, and Tate returned the ball 10 yards to his 40-yard line. Three plays later, Marshawn Lynch scored on a 40-yard touchdown run, tying the score 10–10. The 49ers struck back with Kaepernick completing a 22-yard pass to Michael Crabtree and then rushing for a 22-yard gain himself. Kaepernick fumbled the ball on the next play, but center Jonathan Goodwin recovered it and ran for a 6-yard gain. Kaepernick then finished the drive with a 26-yard scoring completion to Anquan Boldin, putting the 49ers back in front at 17–10. Baldwin returned the ensuing kickoff 69 yards to the 49ers' 33-yard line, setting up Hauschka's 40-yard field goal that made the score 17–13 with less than four minutes left in the third quarter.

Seattle took their first lead of the game on the second play of the fourth quarter, 20–17, scoring on Wilson's 35-yard touchdown pass to Jermaine Kearse on fourth down and 7. A series of fumbles and turnovers followed; first, Seattle defensive end Cliff Avril forced a fumble from Kaepernick, which was then recovered by Michael Bennett on the 49ers' 23-yard line. Seattle then drove to the 10-yard line, and on third down Wilson completed a pass to Kearse. But Kearse fumbled on the 1-yard line as he was going in for a score, while being tackled by linebacker NaVorro Bowman. Replays showed Bowman making a recovery and being touched down by contact, but the play did not end and the ball was pulled away from Bowman. Seattle fullback Michael Robinson ended up with the ball, allowing the Seahawks to maintain possession. The play was not reviewable, and to make matters worse for San Francisco, Bowman suffered a severe leg injury. Now with fourth and goal on the 1-yard line, Seattle coach Pete Carroll decided to go for the touchdown. But Lynch fumbled a handoff from Wilson and the 49ers ended up getting the ball back on the Seahawks 15-yard line. However, all they managed to do with this opportunity was give it back, as Kaepernick was intercepted by safety Kam Chancellor on the second play of their ensuing drive.

Now with the ball on the San Francisco 40-yard line, Seattle drove to the 29-yard line where Hauschka kicked a field goal to give the team a 23–17 lead with 3:37 left in the game. San Francisco responded with a drive to the Seahawks' 18-yard line, featuring a 17-yard reception by running back Frank Gore on fourth down and 2. With 30 seconds remaining, Kaepernick attempted a pass to Crabtree in the corner of the end zone. Cornerback Richard Sherman made a leaping deflection of the pass to the lurking linebacker Malcolm Smith for an interception to seal the victory for the Seahawks.

Wilson completed 16 of 25 passes for 215 yards and a touchdown. Lynch rushed for 109 yards and a score. Baldwin had six catches for 106 yards, and added another 102 yards on three kickoff returns. Chancellor had 11 tackles – of which five were solo tackles – and an interception. Kaepernick finished the game 14-for-24 for 153 yards and a touchdown, with two interceptions and a lost fumble, while also rushing for 130 yards on 11 carries. This was his second 100-yard rushing game in the postseason; only two other quarterbacks in NFL history up to this point ever had one. Bowman had 14 tackles – including six solo tackles – along with a sack, and a forced fumble. Both teams achieved the same number of total yards, with 308.

This was the first postseason meeting between the 49ers and Seahawks.

== Super Bowl XLVIII: Seattle Seahawks 43, Denver Broncos 8 ==
Super Bowl XLVIII – Seattle Seahawks vs. Denver Broncos – Game summary

Quarter	1	2	3	4	Total
Seahawks (NFC)	8	14	14	7	43
Broncos (AFC)	0	0	8	0	8

at MetLife Stadium, East Rutherford, New Jersey

- Date: February 2
- Game time: 6:25 pm EST/4:25 pm MST/3:25 pm PST
- Game weather: 49 °F (9 °C), partly cloudy
- Game attendance: 82,529
- Referee: Terry McAulay
- TV announcers (Fox): Joe Buck (play-by-play), Troy Aikman (color commentator), Pam Oliver, and Erin Andrews (sideline reporters)
- Recap, Game book

Game information

1st quarter

- SEA – Knowshon Moreno tackled in end zone by Cliff Avril for a Safety, 14:48. Seahawks 2–0.
- SEA – Steven Hauschka 31-yard field goal, 10:21. Seahawks 5–0. Drive: 9 plays, 51 yards, 4:27
- SEA – Steven Hauschka 33-yard field goal, 2:16. Seahawks 8–0. Drive: 13 plays, 58 yards, 6:15

2nd quarter

- SEA – Marshawn Lynch 1-yard run (Steven Hauschka kick), 12:00. Seahawks 15–0. Drive: 7 plays, 37 yards, 3:59.
- SEA – Malcolm Smith 69-yard interception return (Steven Hauschka kick), 3:21. Seahawks 22–0.

3rd quarter

- SEA – Percy Harvin 87-yard kickoff return (Steven Hauschka kick), 14:48. Seahawks 29–0.
- SEA – Jermaine Kearse 23-yard pass from Russell Wilson (Steven Hauschka kick), 2:58. Seahawks 36–0. Drive: 6 plays, 58 yards, 2:57.
- DEN – Demaryius Thomas 14-yard pass from Peyton Manning (2-pt conv. – Peyton Manning-Wes Welker pass), 0:00. Seahawks 36–8. Drive: 6 plays, 80 yards, 2:58.

4th quarter

- SEA – Doug Baldwin 10-yard pass from Russell Wilson (Steven Hauschka kick), 11:45. Seahawks 43–8. Drive: 5 plays, 48 yards, 3:15.

Leading passers

- SEA – Russell Wilson – 18/25, 206 yards, 2 TD
- DEN – Peyton Manning – 34/49, 280 yards, 1 TD, 2 INT

Leading rushers

- SEA – Percy Harvin – 2 rushes, 45 yards
- DEN – Knowshon Moreno – 5 rushes, 17 yards

Leading receivers

- SEA – Doug Baldwin – 5 rec, 66 yards, 1 TD
- DEN – Demaryius Thomas – 13 rec, 118 yards, 1 TD

This was the second postseason meeting and first Super Bowl meeting between the Seahawks and Broncos. Seattle won the previous meeting as a member of the AFC 31–7 in the 1983 AFC Wild Card playoffs.
