= 49ers–Seahawks rivalry =

National Football League rivalry

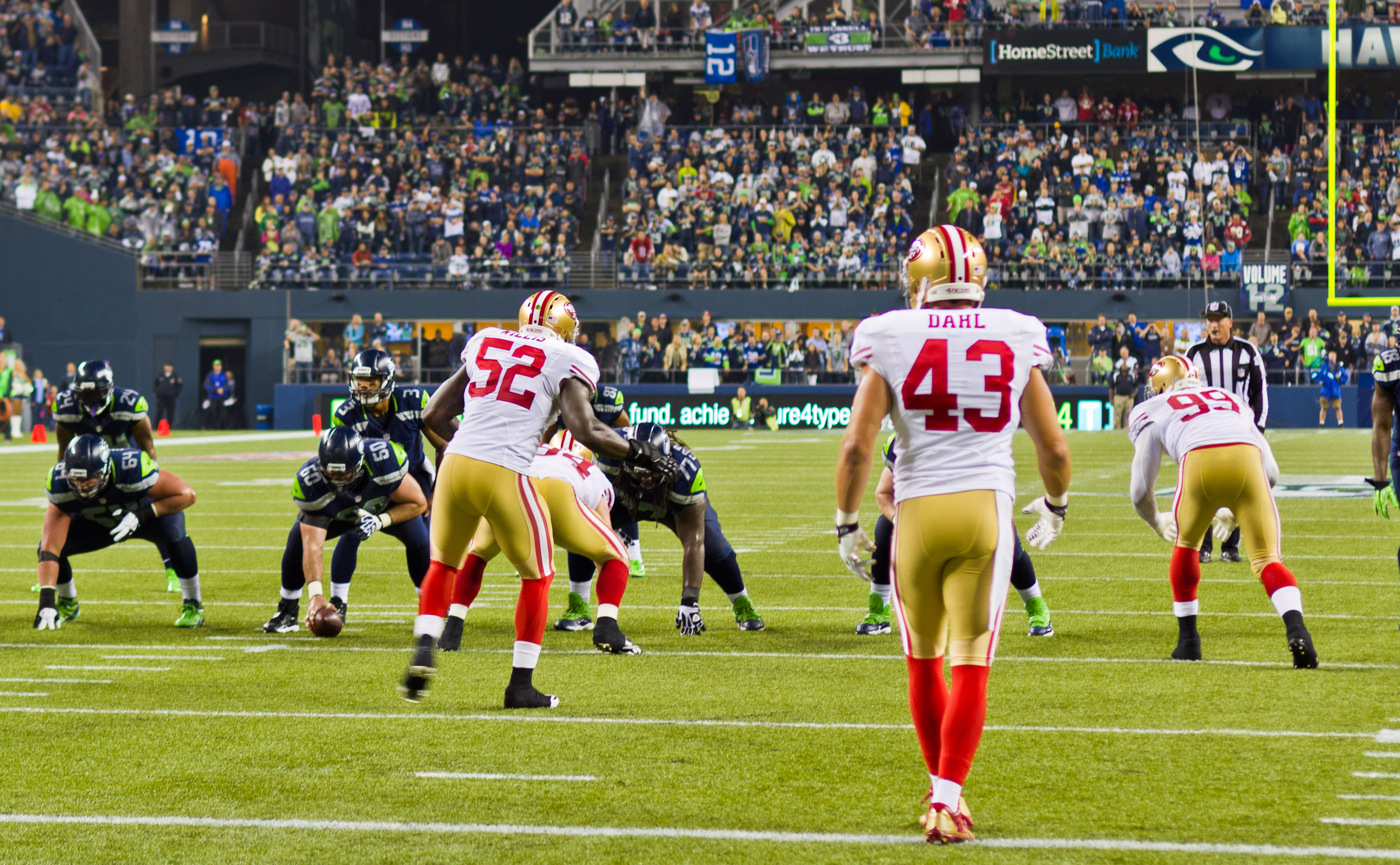
- 49ers and Seahawks face off during Week 2 of the 2013 regular season.

- San Francisco 49ers Seattle Seahawks
- Location: San Francisco, Seattle
- First meeting: September 26, 1976; 49ers 37, Seahawks 21
- Latest meeting: October 11, 2026; 49ers 32, Seahawks 29
- Next meeting: November 29, 2026
- Stadiums: 49ers: Levi's Stadium; Seahawks: Lumen Field

Statistics
- Total meetings: 58
- All-time series: Seahawks: 33–25
- Regular season series: Seahawks: 31–24
- Postseason results: Seahawks: 2–1
- Largest victory: 49ers: 38–7 (1988); Seahawks: 41–3 (2005)
- Most points scored: 49ers: 41 (2022); Seahawks: 43 (2018)
- Longest win streak: 49ers: 6 (2022–2024); Seahawks: 10 (2014–2018)
- Current win streak: 49ers: 1 (2026–present)

Post–season history
- 2013 NFC Championship: Seahawks won: 23–17; 2022 NFC Wild Card: 49ers won: 41–23; 2025 NFC Divisional: Seahawks won: 41–6

The 49ers–Seahawks rivalry is a National Football League (NFL) rivalry between the San Francisco 49ers and Seattle Seahawks. The two teams compete in the NFC West and lie 839 miles away from each other on Interstate 5.

Although the teams met for the first time in 1976, the rivalry did not begin in earnest until 2002, when Seattle was moved to the NFC West and the teams began facing each other twice in every regular season. The rivalry reached new heights in the early 2010s, when the two teams began competing for NFC dominance. Either Seattle or San Francisco won the NFC West in every season from 2010 to 2014, and in this era the rivalry intensified in large part due to an existing feud between head coaches Pete Carroll and Jim Harbaugh. Both on-field competitiveness and off-field tension culminated in the 2014 NFC Championship, in which Seattle narrowly defeated San Francisco en route to Super Bowl XLVII. Since and particular during Harbaugh and Carroll's tenures, the rivalry has been considered among the most heated and competitive in the NFL.

Following Harbaugh's departure, the rivalry waned as Seattle swept San Francisco in three consecutive seasons amid head coach turnover. Kyle Shanahan's appointment as head coach allowed for increased competitiveness as Shanahan led San Francisco to their seventh and eighth Super Bowl appearances. In the 2022 playoffs, San Francisco defeated Seattle in the Wild Card round in the middle of a six-game win streak against Seattle. In the 2025 playoffs, Mike Macdonald's Seahawks blew out San Francisco before winning Super Bowl LX in Levi's Stadium, the 49ers' home field.

The Seahawks lead the overall series, 33–25. The two teams have met three times in the playoffs, with Seattle winning twice.

== History ==
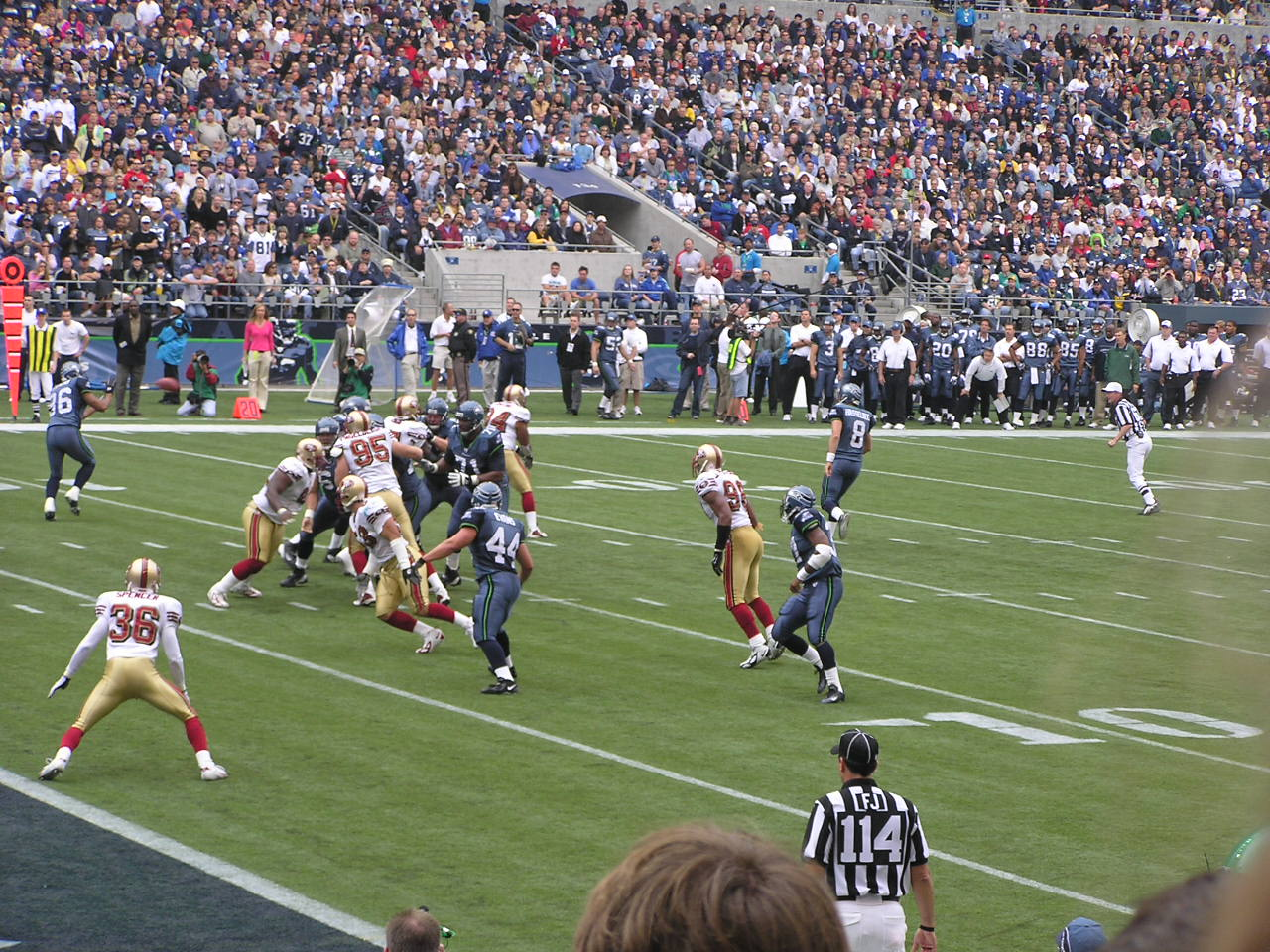
Seattle Seahawks vs. San Francisco 49ers (final score 34–0), September 26, 2004

Since the teams became NFC West division rivals in 2002, the rivalry has grown considerably. The rivalry was previously insignificant, due to both teams having little history against one another and both suffering long stretches of mediocrity. For example, while the Seahawks won four straight division titles from 2004 to 2007, the 49ers finished in third or fourth place each season and did not have a winning season from 2003 to 2010. Likewise, the Seahawks suffered four straight losing seasons from 2008 to 2011. Despite their stretch of mediocrity, the Seahawks have remained competitive in games against the 49ers in those years.

"It don't get much better than the 49ers...it felt like a Super Bowl when we were playing during that time."

— K. J. Wright, Seahawks LB

The rivalry intensified in 2011, when long-standing college rival coaches—former USC coach Pete Carroll and former Stanford head coach Jim Harbaugh—took over as head coaches, with Carroll becoming the Seahawks' head coach in 2010, and Harbaugh becoming the 49ers coach in 2011. Both teams drafted young, mobile quarterbacks to lead their franchises, Seattle's Russell Wilson and San Francisco's Colin Kaepernick. Both coaches turned their respective franchises into perennial playoff contenders, and from 2010 to 2014, either the Seahawks or the 49ers won the NFC West championship.

The two teams met in the 2013 NFC Championship Game in Seattle with a trip to Super Bowl XLVIII on the line, with the Seahawks winning 23–17. The game ended when Seahawks' cornerback Richard Sherman, whom Harbaugh previously coached at Stanford, tipped an end zone pass that led to a game-ending interception. Sherman had his famous postgame interview immediately afterwards, calling out 49ers wide receiver Michael Crabtree and claiming to be the "best corner in the game". Seattle went on to defeat the Denver Broncos 43–8 in Super Bowl XLVIII to win their first Super Bowl championship. San Francisco had represented the NFC in a losing effort in Super Bowl XLVII the previous season. In 2018, Richard Sherman joined San Francisco and took them to Super Bowl LIV while coming a quarter short sparked the rivalry for a short while then it died down again.

After drafting Russell Wilson in 2012, the Seahawks dominated the rivalry, holding a 17–4 record against the 49ers before Wilson's departure in early 2022. After Wilson's departure, the 49ers turned the rivalry around, winning six in a row, which is the longest win streak for the 49ers against the Seahawks, before the Seahawks ended the streak with a come-from-behind 20–17 victory on 17 November 2024, which Geno Smith won with a rushing touchdown 12 seconds before the end of the game. This was Smith's only victory over the 49ers, following five losses.

In the 2025 NFL season, the two teams met in the playoffs for the third time, and this time Seattle won 41–6. This game was a rematch of the Week 18 game to determine the #1 seed in the NFC, which Seattle won 13–3.

== Season-by-season results ==
San Francisco 49ers vs. Seattle Seahawks Season-by-Season Results
1970s–1990s (49ers, 4–2)

Season	Results	Location	Overall series	Notes
1976	49ers 37–21	Kingdome	49ers 1–0	The Seahawks join the NFL as an expansion team. They are placed in the National Football Conference (NFC) and the NFC West, joining the 49ers as divisional rivals. In the following season, the Seahawks and Tampa Bay Buccaneers switched places, with the Seahawks moving to the American Football Conference (AFC) and the AFC West, where they would remain until the 2002 season.
1979	Seahawks; 35–24	Candlestick Park	Tie; 1–1	
1985	49ers 19–6	Candlestick Park	49ers 2–1	Last meeting until the 2002 season the 49ers and Seahawks faced off in San Francisco.
1988	49ers 38–7	Kingdome	49ers 3–1	49ers record their largest victory against the Seahawks with a 31–point differential. 49ers win Super Bowl XXIII.
1991	49ers 24–22	Kingdome	49ers 4–1	The 49ers eliminate the Seahawks from playoff contention with their win.
1997	Seahawks; 38–9	Kingdome	49ers 4–2	Last matchup at the Kingdome.

2000s (Seahawks, 10–6)

Season	Season series	at San Francisco 49ers	at Seattle Seahawks	Overall series	Notes
2002	49ers 2–0	49ers 31–24	49ers 28–21	49ers 6–2	During the NFL realignment, the Seahawks are moved back to the National Football Conference (NFC) and the NFC West, resulting in two meetings annually with the 49ers. Seahawks open Seahawks Stadium (now known as Lumen Field). In Seattle, a notable moment occurred when wide receiver Terrell Owens scored the game-winning touchdown, then signed the ball with a Sharpie he had in his sock. In San Francisco, Seahawks quarterback Matt Hasselbeck threw for 427 passing yards, setting a franchise record for most passing yards in a game (broken later in the season).
2003	Seahawks 2–0	Seahawks; 24–17	Seahawks; 20–19	49ers 6–4	
2004	Seahawks 2–0	Seahawks; 42–27	Seahawks; 34–0	Tie; 6–6	In Seattle, 49ers get shut out for the first time since the 1977 season. Midway through the season, former 49ers wide receiver Jerry Rice is traded to the Seahawks.
2005	Seahawks 2–0	Seahawks; 27–25	Seahawks; 41–3	Seahawks; 8–6	In Seattle, the Seahawks record their largest victory against the 49ers with a 38–point differential and win all of their division games for the first time in franchise history with their win. Seahawks lose Super Bowl XL.
2006	49ers 2–0	49ers 20–14	49ers 24–14	Tie; 8–8	
2007	Seahawks 2–0	Seahawks; 23–3	Seahawks; 24–0	Seahawks; 10–8	
2008	Tie 1–1	Seahawks; 34–13	49ers 33–30 (OT)	Seahawks; 11–9	
2009	Tie 1–1	49ers 23–10	Seahawks; 20–17	Seahawks; 12–10	

2010s (Seahawks, 14–7)

Season	Season series	at San Francisco 49ers	at Seattle Seahawks	Overall series	Notes
2010	Tie 1–1	49ers 40–21	Seahawks; 31–6	Seahawks; 13–11	
2011	49ers 2–0	49ers 33–17	49ers 19–17	Tie; 13–13	
2012	Tie 1–1	49ers 13–6	Seahawks; 42–13	Tie; 14–14	Seahawks draft quarterback Russell Wilson. 49ers lose Super Bowl XLVII.
2013	Tie 1–1	49ers 19–17	Seahawks; 29–3	Tie; 15–15	Last matchup at Candlestick Park
2013 Playoffs	Seahawks 1–0	—N/a	Seahawks; 23–17	Seahawks; 16–15	NFC Championship Game. In a game-winning play, Seahawks cornerback Richard Sherman deflects a last-minute pass intended for 49ers wide receiver Michael Crabtree that gets intercepted by linebacker Malcolm Smith. Seahawks go on to win Super Bowl XLVIII.
2014	Seahawks 2–0	Seahawks; 19–3	Seahawks; 17–7	Seahawks; 18–15	49ers open Levi's Stadium. Game in San Francisco was played on Thanksgiving Day. Seahawks lose Super Bowl XLIX.
2015	Seahawks 2–0	Seahawks; 20–3	Seahawks; 29–13	Seahawks; 20–15	
2016	Seahawks 2–0	Seahawks; 25–23	Seahawks; 37–18	Seahawks; 22–15	
2017	Seahawks 2–0	Seahawks; 24–13	Seahawks; 12–9	Seahawks; 24–15	
2018	Tie 1–1	49ers 26–23 (OT)	Seahawks; 43–16	Seahawks; 25–16	Former Seahawks cornerback Richard Sherman signs with 49ers. In Seattle, the Seahawks record their most points against the 49ers. Seahawks win 10 straight games (2014–2018) and 8 straight at home (2012–2018).
2019	Tie 1–1	Seahawks; 27–24 (OT)	49ers 26–21	Seahawks; 26–17	Seahawks' win handed the 49ers their first loss of the season after a 8–0 start. The 49ers clinched the NFC West and the NFC’s No. 1 seed with their win. 49ers lose Super Bowl LIV.

2020s (49ers, 8–7)

Season	Season series	at San Francisco 49ers	at Seattle Seahawks	Overall series	Notes
2020	Seahawks 2–0	Seahawks; 26–23	Seahawks; 37–27	Seahawks; 28–17	Due to COVID-19-related restrictions on contact sports in Santa Clara, the 49ers' home game is moved to State Farm Stadium in Glendale, Arizona.
2021	Seahawks 2–0	Seahawks; 28–21	Seahawks; 30–23	Seahawks; 30–17	Final start in the series for Seahawks' quarterback Russell Wilson.
2022	49ers 2–0	49ers 27–7	49ers 21–13	Seahawks; 30–19	In Seattle, the 49ers clinched the NFC West title and swept the Seahawks for the first time since the 2011 season and swept the NFC West for the first time since the 1997 season with their win.
2022 Playoffs	49ers 1–0	49ers 41–23	—N/a	Seahawks; 30–20	NFC Wild Card. 49ers score their most points in a game against the Seahawks.
2023	49ers 2–0	49ers 28–16	49ers 31–13	Seahawks; 30–22	Game in Seattle was played on Thanksgiving Day. 49ers lose Super Bowl LVIII.
2024	Tie 1–1	Seahawks; 20–17	49ers 36–24	Seahawks; 31–23	
2025	Tie 1–1	Seahawks; 13–3	49ers 17–13	Seahawks; 32–24	Seahawks clinched the NFC West title and the NFC’s No. 1 seed with their win.
2025 Playoffs	Seahawks 1–0	—N/a	Seahawks; 41–6	Seahawks; 33–24	NFC Divisional Round. Seahawks win Super Bowl LX, played in the 49ers' home stadium.
2026	49ers 1–0	November 29	49ers 32–29	Seahawks; 33–25	

Summary of Results

Season	Season series	at San Francisco 49ers	at Seattle Seahawks	Notes
Regular season	Seahawks 31–24	Seahawks 15–11	Seahawks 16–13	Seahawks are 1–0 at State Farm Stadium in Glendale, Arizona (2020), accounted for as a San Francisco 49ers home game.
Postseason	Seahawks 2–1	49ers 1–0	Seahawks 2–0	NFC Wild Card: 2022; NFC Divisional Round: 2025; NFC Championship: 2013
Regular and postseason	Seahawks 33–25	Seahawks 15–12	Seahawks 18–13	

== See also ==
- List of NFL rivalries
- NFC West
- Heritage Cup: Major League Soccer (MLS) rivalry between the Bay Area and Seattle
- Pete Carroll–Jim Harbaugh rivalry
