= The Tip (American football) =

Notable play in 2013 NFC championship game

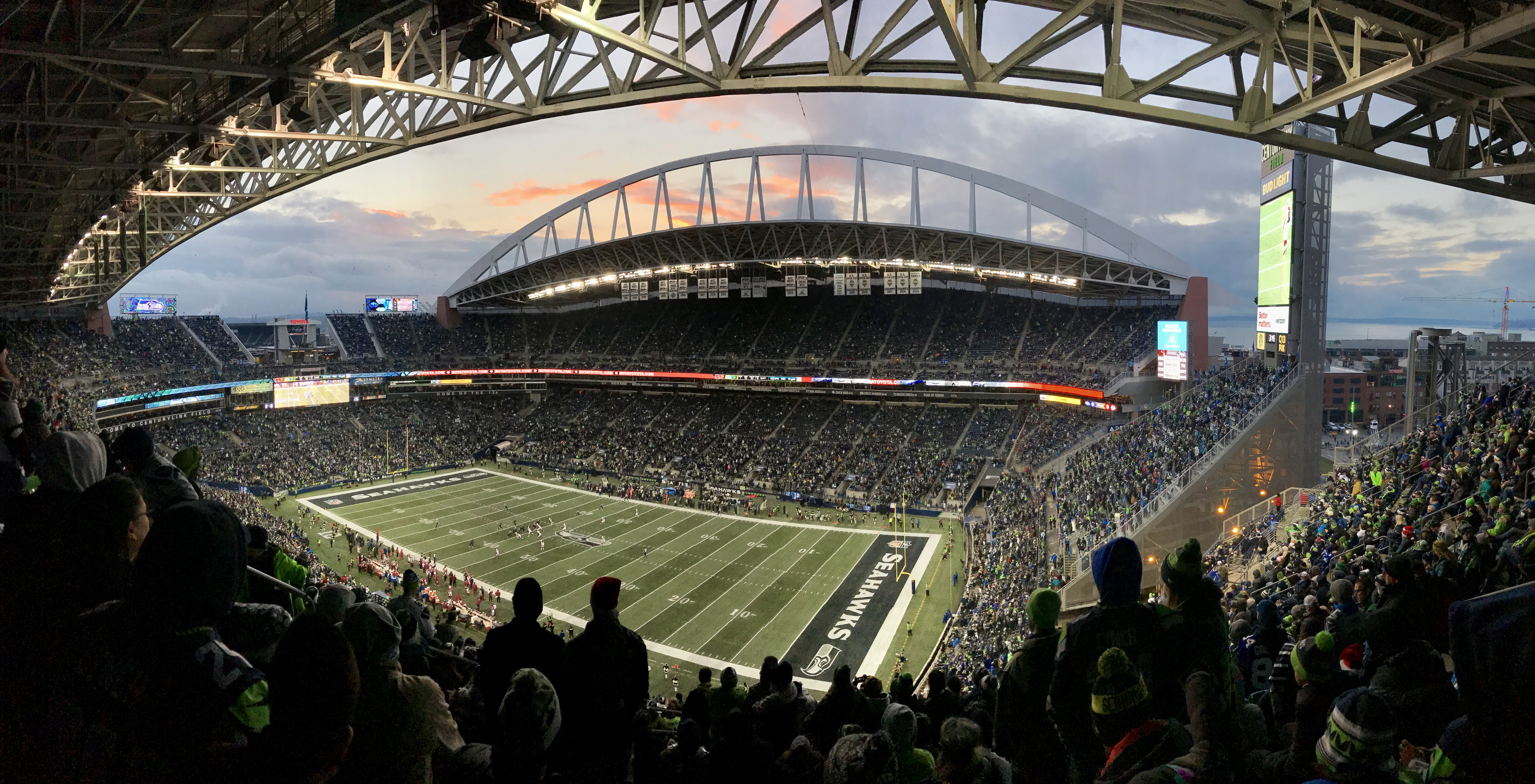
- CenturyLink Field (now Lumen Field), the site of the game, in 2016
San Francisco 49ers (5) (12–4)	Seattle Seahawks (1) (13–3)
17	23
Head coach: Jim Harbaugh	Head coach: Pete Carroll
	1	2	3	4	Total
SF	3	7	7	0	17
SEA	0	3	10	10	23
- Date: January 19, 2014, 3:42 PM PST
- Stadium: CenturyLink Field; Seattle, Washington
- Favorite: Seahawks by 4
- Referee: Gene Steratore
- Attendance: 68,454

TV in the United States
- Network: Fox
- Announcers: Joe Buck, Troy Aikman, Pam Oliver, and Erin Andrews

The Tip, sometimes referred to as the Immaculate Deflection, was a play in the 2013 NFC Championship Game in the National Football League (NFL) between the division rivals of the #5 seeded San Francisco 49ers and the #1 seeded Seattle Seahawks. The game was played in CenturyLink Field (now known as Lumen Field) in Seattle, Washington and, being the NFC Championship Game, was televised nationally on Fox.

With the score 23–17 in favor of the Seahawks, the 49ers had driven the ball all the way to the Seahawks' 18 yard line. With 30 seconds left in regulation, 49ers quarterback Colin Kaepernick threw a pass to Michael Crabtree in the right corner of the endzone. Before Crabtree could catch the ball, cornerback Richard Sherman deflected the ball directly into linebacker Malcolm Smith's hands for an interception, sealing the Seahawks victory. With the win, the Seahawks advanced to just their second Super Bowl appearance in franchise history, in which they defeated the Denver Broncos 43–8 for their first ever Super Bowl win. The Tip is often considered one of the biggest moments in Seattle Seahawks history.

== Events of the play ==
Until the fourth quarter, the Seahawks had not had a lead the entire game. That changed when Seahawks quarterback Russell Wilson threw a 35-yard touchdown pass to Jermaine Kearse with 13:44 left in the game, making the score 20–17. After a 47-yard field goal by Steven Hauschka with 3:37 left, the lead increased to 23–17.

The 49ers moved the ball quickly to the 18 yard line, needing a touchdown and subsequent extra point to retake the lead. With 30 seconds remaining, 49ers quarterback Colin Kaepernick avoided mounting pressure from defensive end Cliff Avril, launching a pass to Michael Crabtree in the right side of the endzone. Before Crabtree could catch the ball, cornerback Richard Sherman leaped into the air and tipped the ball. It promptly landed into the hands of linebacker Malcolm Smith, who took a knee for a Seahawks touchback with 22 seconds left in the game.

== After the play ==
After a brief celebration, Sherman ran over to Crabtree and offered his hand for a handshake, but Crabtree shoved Sherman's facemask. Sherman then directed a choke sign at Crabtree, which earned him an unsportsmanlike conduct flag. Since there was still 22 seconds left, the game continued. Russell Wilson knelt three times, causing the 49ers to burn their last two timeouts, and the game was over.

=== Richard Sherman's post-game interview ===
The following is Sherman's now-famous post-game interview with Erin Andrews:

Andrews: "Joe, thank you so much. Richard, let me ask you; The final play, take me through it."

Sherman: "Well, I'm the best corner in the game! When you try me with a sorry receiver like Crabtree, that's the result you gon' get! Don't you ever talk about me!"

Andrews: "Who was talking about you?"

Sherman: "Michael Crabtree! Don't you open your mouth about the best! Or, y'know, I'm gonna shut it for you real quick! L.O.B.!"

Andrews: "Alright, before--" [Sherman marches away, offscreen] "And Joe, back over to you!"

Many considered Sherman's outburst as immature, rude, and disrespectful toward both Crabtree and Andrews. Sherman later said in a CNN interview "You know, I don't mean to attack [Crabtree]. And that was immature and I probably shouldn't have done that. I regret doing that."

== Name ==
The play was later dubbed the Immaculate Deflection as a tribute to the Immaculate Reception. The plays were somewhat similar: in both plays, the pass was deflected into a teammate's hand. However, the Immaculate Deflection resulted in an interception, whereas, with the Immaculate Reception, it was caught by the offense and run in for a touchdown.

== Aftermath ==
The Seahawks went on to blow out the Denver Broncos 43–8 in Super Bowl XLVIII two weeks later, winning their first Lombardi Trophy in team history. The 49ers, however, did not return to the playoffs until 2019, also failing to climb above the .500 mark in terms of their win–loss record in each of the following seasons until 2019. Some credit Sherman's tip with the steady decline of the 49ers. Coincidentally, Sherman joined the 49ers in 2018.

Six days after the Championship game, Sherman was fined $7,875 for his unsportsmanlike conduct penalty toward Crabtree.

In 2018 in a week 13 matchup between the 49ers and the Seahawks, the Seahawks reenacted Sherman's tip after a 1st quarter touchdown pass. Doug Baldwin played the role of Sherman, tipping the ball to David Moore, who played the role of Malcolm Smith. Jaron Brown played Kaepernick, and Tyler Lockett played Crabtree. Since both Sherman and Smith were currently on the 49ers, it was unsure if it was a tribute to Sherman, or mockery, especially after Sherman called the Seahawks a middle of the road team prior to the game. The Seahawks won the game 43-16 and officially eliminated the 49ers from playoff contention. The 49ers, however, exacted revenge by defeating the Seahawks, two weeks later, 26-23 in overtime.

Both teams have played each other twice in the playoffs, with San Francisco and Seattle both winning at their home stadium. The 49ers had won the 2022 NFC Wild Card Game, while the Seahawks won the 2025 NFC Divisional Game. Unlike the 2013 playoff game between the rivals, both games were blowouts, with the 49ers winning the 2022 matchup 41-23, and the Seahawks winning the 2025 matchup 41-6.

== Starting lineups ==
Hall of Fame‡

San Francisco	Position		Seattle
Offense
Colin Kaepernick	QB		Russell Wilson
Frank Gore	RB		Marshawn Lynch
Anthony Dixon	FB		Michael Robinson
Anquan Boldin	WR		Doug Baldwin
Vernon Davis	TE	WR	Jermaine Kearse
Vance McDonald	TE		Zach Miller
Joe Staley	LT		Russell Okung
Mike Iupati	LG		James Carpenter
Jonathan Goodwin	C		Max Unger
Alex Boone	RG		J. R. Sweezy
Anthony Davis	RT		Breno Giacomini
Defense
Glenn Dorsey	NT	LDE	Red Bryant
Ray McDonald	LDT		Tony McDaniel
Justin Smith	RDT		Brandon Mebane
Aldon Smith	OLB	RDE	Chris Clemons
Ahmad Brooks	OLB		Bruce Irvin
NaVorro Bowman	ILB	OLB	Malcolm Smith
Patrick Willis‡	ILB	MLB	Bobby Wagner
Tramaine Brock	LCB		Richard Sherman
Tarell Brown	RCB		Byron Maxwell
Eric Reid	SS		Kam Chancellor
Donte Whitner	FS		Earl Thomas

== Officials ==
- Referee: Gene Steratore (114)
- Line judge: Byron Boston (18)
- Head linesman: Dana McKenzie (8)
- Field judge: Scott Edwards (3)
- Umpire: Bill Schuster (129)
- Side judge: Greg Meyer (78)
- Back judge: Perry Paganelli (46)
- Replay official: Paul Weidner

== See also ==
- 49ers–Seahawks rivalry
- 2013 NFL season
- 2013 San Francisco 49ers season
- 2013 Seattle Seahawks season
- List of nicknamed NFL games and plays
- Pete Carroll–Jim Harbaugh rivalry
