= Pete Carroll–Jim Harbaugh rivalry =

American football rivalry

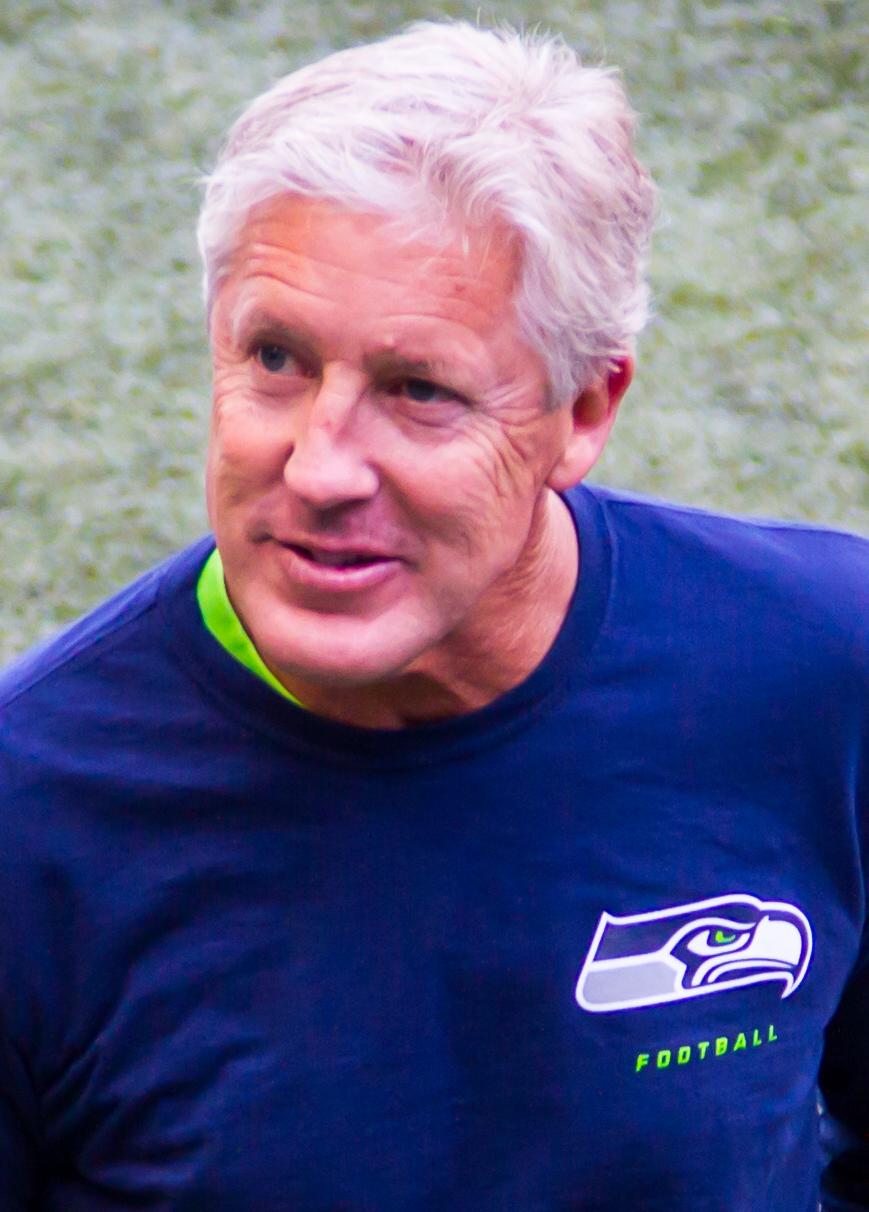
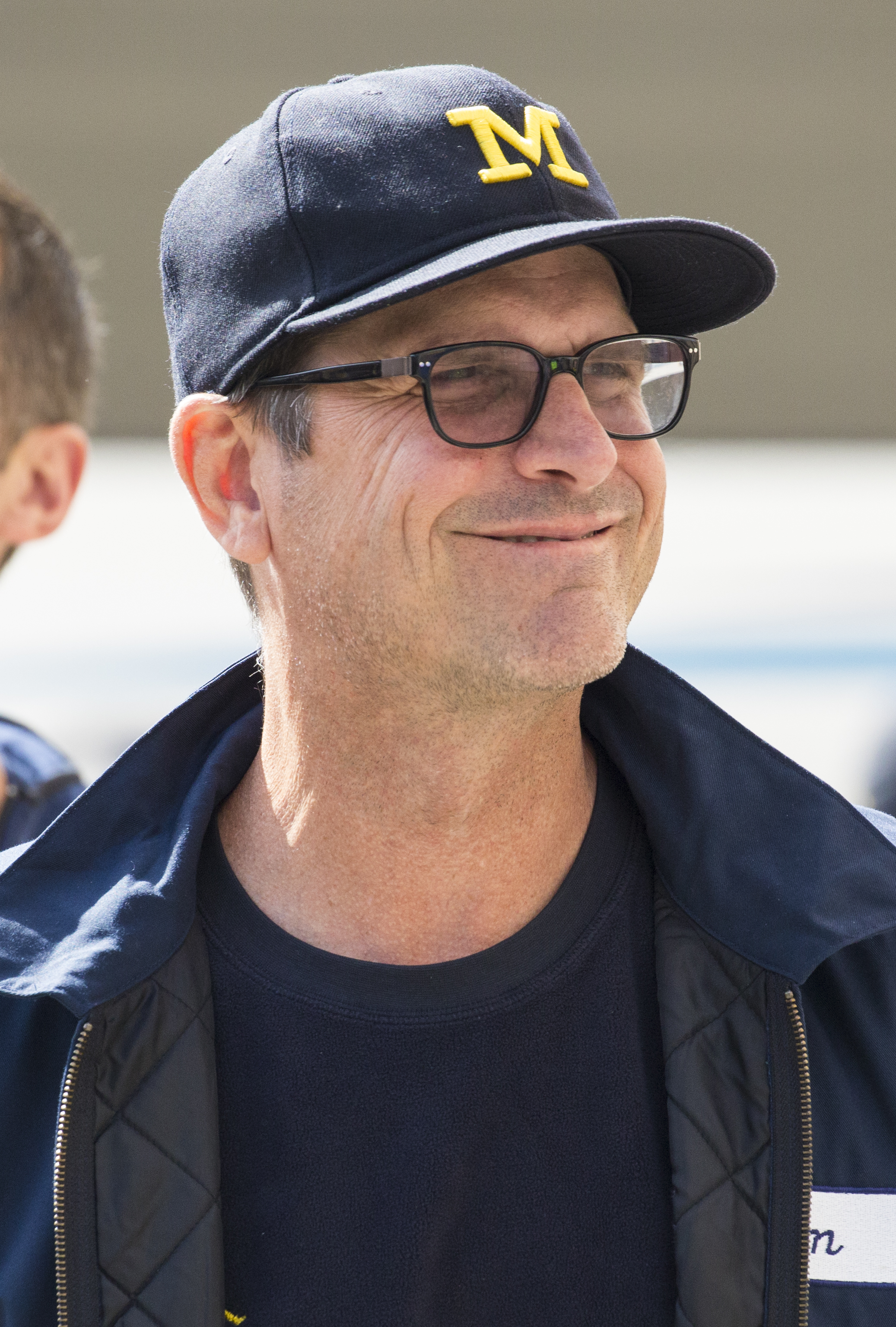
Pete Carroll (left, pictured 2014) and Jim Harbaugh (pictured 2018)

The Pete Carroll–Jim Harbaugh rivalry is an American football rivalry between coaches Pete Carroll and Jim Harbaugh. The rivalry is noted for its breadth, with Carroll and Harbaugh coaching rival teams across both college football and the National Football League. Their most notable stint as rivals lasted from 2007 to 2014, when Carroll served as the head coach of the USC Trojans and the Seattle Seahawks, while Harbaugh coached the Stanford Cardinal and San Francisco 49ers. Harbaugh leads the all-time series 8–6, while Carroll won their only playoff matchup.

From 2007 to 2009, the two competed within the Pac-10 Conference, on opposing sides of the Stanford–USC rivalry. After Carroll moved to the professional level with the Seattle Seahawks, he was followed a season later by Harbaugh, who joined the Seahawks rival 49ers in the NFC West. From 2011 to 2014, the two teams faced off twice a year, with Carroll and Harbaugh's feud adding to the existing rivalry as the two teams vied for NFC West dominance. Their most notable meeting, and only post-season meeting, came during the 2013 NFC Championship, where Seattle defeated San Francisco on the way to their first franchise Super Bowl victory.

The rivalry took a 10-year hiatus beginning in 2015, when Harbaugh returned to the NCAA as the head coach of the Michigan Wolverines, while Carroll remained in Seattle. After Carroll left the Seahawks following the 2023 season Harbaugh returned to the NFL in the 2024 season, as the head coach of the Los Angeles Chargers of the AFC West. The next season, Carroll joined Harbaugh in the AFC West as the head coach of the Las Vegas Raiders. After two additional match-ups, the rivalry took another pause when Carroll was fired from Las Vegas at the end of the 2025 season.

The rivalry, marked by both on-field competitiveness and off-field tension, has been regarded as one of the fiercest in both college and professional football. In 2013, sports columnist Mike Freeman of Bleacher Report called it "the best rivalry in the NFL", while sportscaster Adam Schein called them both each other's "greatest rival" in a 2014 article for NFL.com.

== History ==
=== 1987-1997: Early meetings ===
After a series of coordinator and position coach jobs in both the NCAA and NFL, Carroll became the defensive backs coach of the Minnesota Vikings in 1985. Harbaugh, at the time a quarterback, was selected in the first round of the 1987 NFL draft by the Vikings' NFC North rival Chicago Bears. Over the next three years, the Bears and Vikings split the series 3-3. After the 1989 season, Carroll departed Minnesota to become the defensive coordinator of the New York Jets.

Carroll and Harbaugh met again in the 1991 season, Harbaugh's first full season as the Bears' starting quarterback. In a 19-13 win for Chicago, Harbaugh achieved the first 300-yard game of his career in a week three Monday Night Football game. The two met again in 1994, with Carroll now the head coach of the Jets and Harbaugh the starting quarterback of the Indianapolis Colts. Carroll's Jets won 16-6, with Harbaugh throwing for 95 yards and zero touchdowns. The next season, Harbaugh, in the best statistical season of his career, defeated the San Francisco 49ers, with whom Carroll was serving as a defensive coordinator.

In 1997, Carroll, now the head coach of the New England Patriots, defeated Harbaugh and the Colts 31-6, in Harbaugh's last season in Indianapolis. The game was their last match-up in the NFL until the 2011 season. Overall, teams with Carroll on their staff held a 5-3 record against Harbaugh.

=== 2007-2009: USC and Stanford ===
After leaving the NFL, Carroll was hired by the USC Trojans of the Pac-10 Conference. Carroll's hiring was heavily criticized, with Carroll's NFL record considered inadequate for a revival of USC's stagnant program. After a shaky start, Carroll's Trojans experience unexpected success, garnering a 65-12 record along with winning two national championships and five Pac-10 championships through the 2006 season. Harbaugh experienced similar turnaround success as the head coach of the San Diego Toreros, collecting a 29-6 record and winning two Pioneer Football League championships. During his time at San Diego, Harbaugh unsuccessfully attempted to recruit Carroll's son, Nate Carroll, who ultimately declined Harbaugh to follow his father to USC. In 2006, Harbaugh was hired as the head coach for the Stanford Cardinal, joining Carroll in the Pac-10. With the hire, Carroll and Harbaugh would regularly compete against each other, as both teams played against each other annually as part of a longstanding rivalry.

As head coaches, the two had their first game against each other in the 2007 season, when the Trojans hosted the Cardinal. USC was experiencing a 35-game winning streak at home and were expected to have a blowout victory, with spread betting odds favoring the Trojans a point spread of between 39 and 41.5 points. However, the Cardinal defeated the Trojans 24–23 in one of the largest point-spread upsets in college football history. The following season, Stanford hosted USC in a game won by the Trojans 45–23. According to David Leon Moore of USA Today, the game saw "some odd gamesmanship" in the closing moments. In garbage time, Carroll attempted to ice the kicker during a field goal attempt from Stanford. Following this, Harbaugh opted against repeating the field goal attempt and instead directed the team to score another touchdown, which they did.

In 2009, Carroll's and Harbaugh's teams met for the first time with both having winning records. In a blowout win, Stanford defeated USC with a final score of 55–21, breaking the record for the most points any team had ever scored against USC in a single game. Towards the end of the game, Harbaugh's team attempted to run up the score by attempting a two-point conversion instead of an extra point kick. As a result, during the coaches' post-game handshake at midfield, Carroll asked Harbaugh, "What's your deal? You all right?", to which Harbaugh replied, "Yeah, I'm good. What's your deal?". Carroll then turned and said "Nice game". According to Marcel Davis of Bleacher Report, this post-game interaction "put the microscope on every one of their meetings". At the end of the season, Carroll stepped down as the Trojans' head coach. In a 2014 article on the two coaches, Moore stated, "Harbaugh's upstart Stanford program helped end Carroll's University of Southern California dynasty".

=== 2011-2014: Seattle and San Francisco ===
Carroll departed from USC in January 2010, accepting an offer to become the head coach for the NFL's Seattle Seahawks. Meanwhile, Harbaugh remained the Cardinal's head coach for the 2010 season before accepting a head coaching position with the NFL's San Francisco 49ers. As in their college coaching careers, the two were guaranteed to meet each other on an annual basis, as both teams were in the NFC West division. As a result, the rivalry recommenced for the 2011 NFL season. When taking over as head coach, Harbaugh reportedly told 49ers CEO Jed York that he was ready to beat Carroll again. In both teams' season openers and the first time that the two coaches had faced each other in the NFL as head coaches, Harbaugh's 49ers defeated Carroll's Seahawks 33–17. Carroll's first win against Harbaugh would come the following season.

While the 49ers were one of the most successful teams in the NFC West during their first few seasons under Harbaugh, Davis reported early in the 2013 season that Carroll's Seahawks had supplanted them as the division's premier team. In the 2013–14 NFL playoffs, the two teams met in the NFC Championship Game. The Seahawks won with a score of 23–17, advancing to Super Bowl XLVIII. In June 2014, during a town hall meeting, Carroll responded to a reporter's question about his rivalry with Harbaugh by saying, "I think Jim's a great coach. I've watched him in college, I've watched him in San Francisco. He's done a great job molding the style of play and he's a big force in our division … and we love beating him." This NFC West rivalry lasted through the 2014 season, after which Harbaugh accepted the head coaching position for the Michigan Wolverines football team. After their final matchup between their two teams on December 14, Harbaugh and Carroll shook hands and had a cordial conversation on the field. One close observer reported that Harbaugh told Carroll "thanks for the rivalry. It’s been fun." Following Harbaugh's departure from the NFL, their all time series as head coaches was tied at 6-6.

Carroll worked with the Seahawks until stepping down as head coach after the 2023 season.

=== 2025: Las Vegas and Los Angeles ===
Prior to the start of the 2024 season, Harbaugh returned to the NFL when he accepted the head coaching position for the Los Angeles Chargers. Following that season, the Las Vegas Raiders announced that they had hired Carroll as their new head coach, to start in the 2025 season. As both teams compete in the AFC West division, Reuters reported on the hiring by saying that Carroll would "resume a long rivalry" with Harbaugh. Ultimately, the Chargers beat the Raiders in both of their regular season matchups, with the Raiders failing to advance to the playoffs. Carroll was fired after the 2025 season after posting a 3–14 record.

== Accomplishments ==
As of January 11, 2026

=== NFL ===
Accomplishment	Carroll	Harbaugh
Head-to-head wins	5	6
Super Bowls	1	0
Super Bowl app.	2	1
Playoff app.	12	4
Division titles	6	2
Regular season record	173–134–1 (.563)	66–31–1 (.679)
Playoff record	11–11 (.500)	5–5 (.500)

- Carroll and Harbaugh only met head-to-head as Seahawks/49ers and Raiders/Chargers head coaches but Carroll also coached for the Jets and Patriots.

=== College ===
Accomplishment	Carroll	Harbaugh
Head-to-head wins	1	2
National titles	2	1
Conference titles	7	5
Overall record	97–19 (.836)	144–52 (.735)
Bowl record	7–2 (.778)	5–7 (.417)

- Carroll and Harbaugh only met head-to-head as USC/Stanford head coaches but Harbaugh also coached for San Diego and Michigan.

== Results ==
As of November 30, 2025

Pete Carroll vs. Jim Harbaugh Game-by-Game Results
Season	Date	Carroll	Result	Harbaugh	Location	Series	Notes
2007	October 6	No. 2 USC	23–24	Stanford	Los Angeles	Harbaugh 1–0	2007 Stanford vs. USC football game: First meeting between the two as head coaches.
2008	November 15	No. 6 USC	45–23	Stanford	Stanford	Tied 1–1	
2009	November 14	No. 9 USC	21–55	Stanford	Los Angeles	Harbaugh 2–1	"What's your deal?" game with confrontation in postgame handshake. Last college meeting.
2011	September 11	Seahawks	17–33	49ers	San Francisco	Harbaugh 3–1	First NFL meeting.
2011	December 24	Seahawks	17–19	49ers	Seattle	Harbaugh 4–1	
2012	October 18	Seahawks	6–13	49ers	San Francisco	Harbaugh 5–1	
2012	December 23	Seahawks	42–13	49ers	Seattle	Harbaugh 5–2	Largest margin of victory in the NFL. Harbaugh's birthday.
2013	September 15	Seahawks	29–3	49ers	Seattle	Harbaugh 5–3	
2013	December 8	Seahawks	17–19	49ers	San Francisco	Harbaugh 6–3	
2013–14 playoffs	January 19	No. 1 Seahawks	23–17	No. 5 49ers	Seattle	Harbaugh 6–4	The Tip: Only playoff matchup between the two.
2014	November 27	Seahawks	19–3	49ers	Santa Clara	Harbaugh 6–5	Thanksgiving game.
2014	December 14	Seahawks	17–7	49ers	Seattle	Tied 6–6	Last meeting as NFC West rivals.
2025	September 15	Raiders	9–20	Chargers	Paradise	Harbaugh 7–6	First meeting as AFC West rivals. Carroll's birthday.
2025	November 30	Raiders	14–31	Chargers	Inglewood	Harbaugh 8–6	Last meeting as AFC West rivals.
