= Richard Sherman (American football) =

American football player (born 1988)

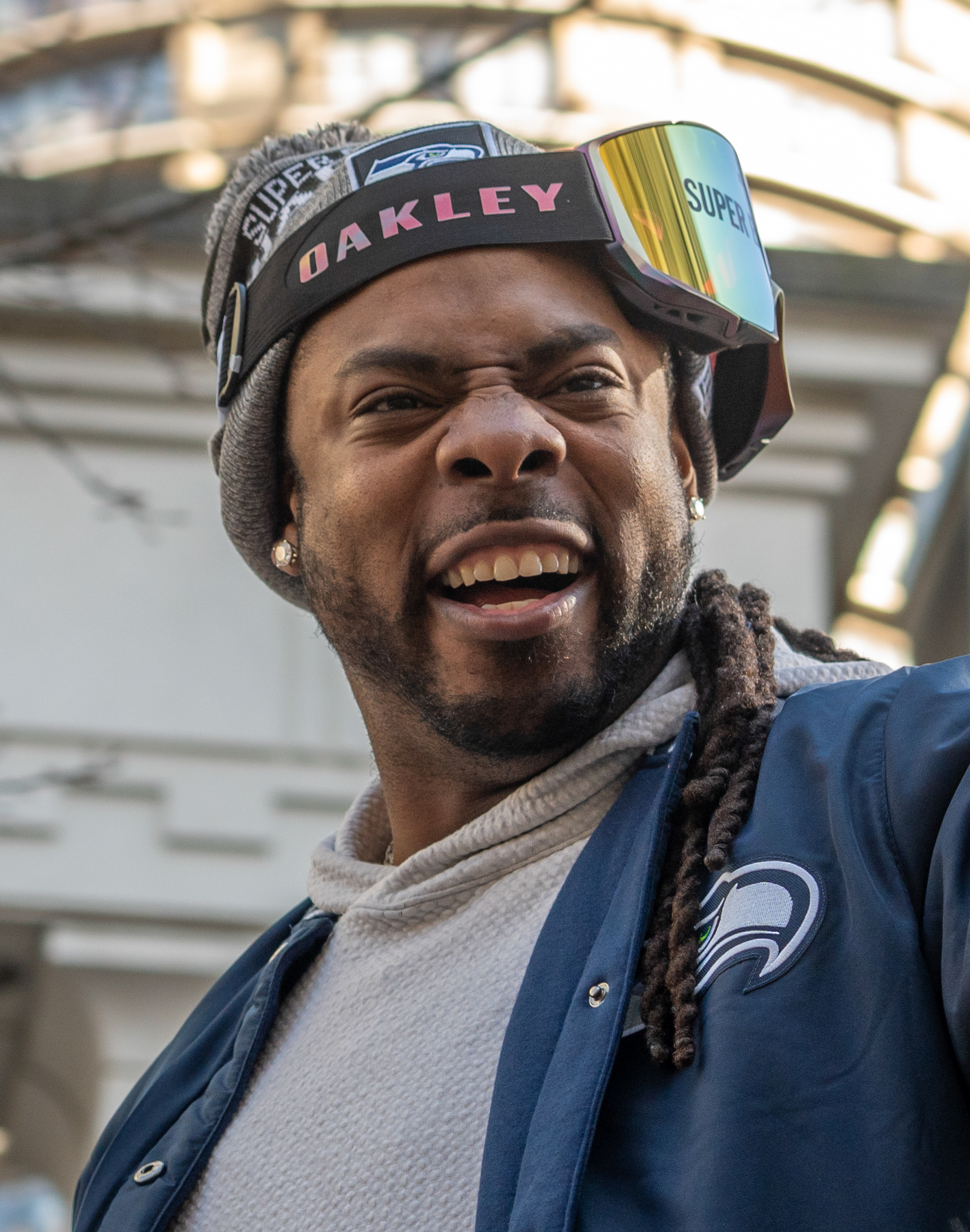
- Sherman in 2026

No. 25, 5
- Position: Cornerback

Personal information
- Born: March 30, 1988 (age 38); Compton, California, U.S.
- Listed height: 6 ft 3 in (1.91 m)
- Listed weight: 195 lb (88 kg)

Career information
- High school: Manuel Dominguez (Compton)
- College: Stanford (2006–2010)
- NFL draft: 2011: 5th round, 154th overall pick

Career history
- Seattle Seahawks (2011–2017); San Francisco 49ers (2018–2020); Tampa Bay Buccaneers (2021)

Awards and highlights
- Super Bowl champion (XLVIII); 3× First-team All-Pro (2012–2014); 2× Second-team All-Pro (2015, 2019); 5× Pro Bowl (2013–2016, 2019); NFL interceptions leader (2013); NFL 2010s All-Decade Team; Seattle Seahawks Top 50 players; PFWA All-Rookie Team (2011)

Career NFL statistics
- Total tackles: 495
- Pass deflections: 116
- Interceptions: 37
- Forced fumbles: 5
- Fumble recoveries: 7
- Defensive touchdowns: 3
- Stats at Pro Football Reference

Richard Kevin Sherman (born March 30, 1988) is an American former professional football cornerback who played 11 seasons in the National Football League (NFL). He played college football for the Stanford Cardinal, beginning his career as a wide receiver before moving to cornerback as a junior. Sherman was selected by the Seattle Seahawks in the fifth round of the 2011 NFL draft. He was selected to the Pro Bowl five times and voted All-Pro five times, including three first-team selections. In 2013, Sherman led the NFL in interceptions. Sherman is considered to be one of the greatest cornerbacks of all time.

During his time as a member of the Seahawks, Sherman was part of the "Legion of Boom" defense, the secondary that led the NFL in pass defense in 2013 and 2014. This unit helped the Seahawks win Super Bowl XLVIII; their 43–8 victory over the Denver Broncos matched the third-largest margin of victory in the history of the Super Bowl. The Seahawks made it to Super Bowl XLIX the following season, losing in a close game against the New England Patriots. During Sherman's time with the Seahawks, they led the league in scoring defense for four straight years between 2012 and 2015, making them the first team to do so since the 1950s Cleveland Browns. After playing with the Seahawks, Sherman played for the San Francisco 49ers for three seasons, where he made his third Super Bowl appearance in Super Bowl LIV, and then spent his final season with the Tampa Bay Buccaneers.

== Education ==
Sherman attended Dominguez High School in Compton, California, starring in football and track and field. As a senior in 2005, he accounted for 1,030 all-purpose yards, including 870 yards on 28 catches and three punt returns for touchdowns. Sherman also recorded 45 tackles, eight pass breakups and an interception as a cornerback, and helped Dominguez to a CIF Southern Section Division III title with a 41–14 victory over Sherman Oaks Notre Dame High School in the championship game.

As a member of the school's track team, Sherman was named a USA Today All-American after winning the California state title in the triple jump, with a mark of 15.44 meters, and was the seventh ranked triple jumper in California in 2005. He made it to the finals of the state meet in the 110-meter hurdles, placing third with a time of 13.99 seconds, and also finished sixth in the long jump, with a mark of 7.25 meters. Sherman was also timed at 10.77 seconds in the 100 meters.

Sherman graduated in 2006, when his classmates voted him the "Male student most likely to succeed". A scholar-athlete, Sherman was salutatorian (ranked second) in his high school class, graduating with a 4.2 GPA.

Sherman is a member of Phi Beta Sigma fraternity and graduated from Stanford University in 2010 with an undergraduate degree in communications. He began work towards his master's degree when he returned for a fifth year during his final year of eligibility.

Recruiting

College recruiting
Name	Hometown	School	Height	Weight	40^{‡}	Commit date
Richard Sherman; Athlete	Compton, California	Dominguez High School	6 ft 2 in (1.88 m)	167 lb (76 kg)	4.64	Jan 15, 2006
Richard Sherman; Athlete	Recruit ratings: Scout: Rivals:					
Overall recruit ranking: Scout: 61 (WR) Rivals: – National, 65 (CB), 93 (Cal)
‡ Refers to 40-yard dash; Note: In many cases, Scout, Rivals, 247Sports, On3, and ESPN may conflict in their listings of height, weight and 40 time.; In these cases, the average was taken. ESPN grades are on a 100-point scale.; Sources: "Stanford Football Commitments". Rivals.; "2006 Stanford Football Recruiting Commits". Scout.; "Scout.com Team Recruiting Rankings". Scout.; "2006 Team Ranking". Rivals.com.

== College career ==
After originally committing to UCLA, Sherman received an athletic scholarship to attend Stanford University, where he played for the Stanford Cardinal football team from 2006 to 2010 under head coaches Walt Harris and Jim Harbaugh. Sherman began his career at Stanford as a wide receiver and led the Cardinal in receiving as a freshman in 2006 while being named an honorable mention to the Freshman All-American Team by Sporting News. In the 2006 season, he had 34 receptions for 581 yards and three touchdowns. Sherman caught 47 passes over the next two years before suffering a season-ending knee injury after playing in the first four games in 2008, which became a redshirt year. He was granted his request to switch to cornerback after his injury and made 112 tackles over his final two years, with six interceptions. Sherman was part of the 2010 Stanford Cardinal team that finished 12–1, a school record.

== Professional career ==
=== Pre-draft ===
On January 29, 2011, Sherman played in the 2011 Senior Bowl and deflected two passes as part of Marvin Lewis' North team that lost 24–10 to the South. Sherman was added as a late replacement after Curtis Marsh Jr. sustained a hamstring injury on the first day of practice. His Senior Bowl performance was well received and was expected to raise his draft stock. Sherman attended the NFL Scouting Combine and completed all of the combine and positional drills.

External videos
- Richard Sherman's NFL Combine Workout
- Richard Sherman's 40-yard dash

On March 17, 2011, Sherman participated at Stanford's pro day and attempted to improve on his combine performance. He performed the 40-yard dash (4.53), 20-yard dash (2.56s), 10-yard dash (1.58s), vertical jump (37"), broad jump (11'0"), short shuttle (4.29s), and three-cone drill (6.72s). At the conclusion of the pre-draft process, Sherman was projected to be selected anywhere from the fourth to sixth rounds by the majority of NFL draft experts and scouts. The Sporting News projected him to be a second round pick and Fox Sports' Peter Schrager projected Sherman to be a fifth round pick. Sherman was ranked as the fourth best cornerback in the draft by The Sporting News, the 22nd best cornerback by USA Today, the 24th cornerback prospect by DraftScout.com, and the 30th best cornerback by Pro Football Weekly.

Pre-draft measurables
Height	Weight	Arm length	Hand span	Wingspan	40-yard dash	10-yard split	20-yard split	20-yard shuttle	Three-cone drill	Vertical jump	Broad jump	Bench press	Wonderlic
6 ft 2 5/8 in (1.90 m)	195 lb (88 kg)	32 in (0.81 m)	9 3/4 in (0.25 m)	6 ft 6 1/4 in (1.99 m)	4.53 s	1.58 s	2.56 s	4.29 s	6.72 s	38.0 in (0.97 m)	11 ft 0 in (3.35 m)	16 reps	24
All values from NFL Combine/Pro Day

=== Seattle Seahawks ===
==== 2011 season ====
The Seattle Seahawks selected Sherman in the fifth round (154th overall) of the 2011 NFL draft. He was the 25th cornerback drafted in 2011. While watching the draft with his family at home, Sherman was "livid" about players he perceived as inferior getting drafted before him.

On July 22, 2011, the Seahawks signed Sherman to a four-year, $2.22 million contract that included a signing bonus of $182,424. Throughout training camp, he competed to be a starting cornerback against Walter Thurmond, Kelly Jennings, Byron Maxwell, Brandon Browner, and Kennard Cox. Head coach Pete Carroll named Sherman the fourth cornerback on the depth chart to begin the regular season, behind Marcus Trufant, Brandon Browner, and Walter Thurmond.

Sherman made his professional regular season debut in the season-opening 33–17 loss at the San Francisco 49ers. Three weeks later, Sherman made his first career solo tackle during a 13-yard punt return by wide receiver Eric Weems as the Seahawks narrowly lost 30–28 to the Atlanta Falcons. On October 30, 2011, Sherman earned his first career start after Marcus Trufant and Walter Thurmond were both placed on injured reserve for the remainder of the season. He finished the 34–12 loss to the Cincinnati Bengals with five combined tackles, a season-high three pass deflections, and made his first career interception. Sherman made his first career interception off a pass by quarterback Andy Dalton, that was originally intended for wide receiver A. J. Green, in the third quarter. In Week 12, Sherman collected a season-high seven combined tackles, a pass deflection, and intercepted a pass by Rex Grossman during a 23–17 loss to the Washington Redskins. On January 1, 2012, Sherman recorded a season-high six solo tackles, a pass deflection, and an interception in the 23–20 loss at the Arizona Cardinals in Week 17. Sherman intercepted a pass by Cardinals' quarterback John Skelton, that was initially intended for wide receiver Andre Roberts and returned it for a 33-yard gain in the fourth quarter.

Sherman finished his rookie year with 55 combined tackles (47 solo), 14 pass deflections, four interceptions, and a forced fumble in 16 games and 10 starts. Sherman was selected to the 2011 PFW All-Rookie Team and led all rookies with 17 pass deflections and four interceptions. Pro Football Focus gave him an overall grade of 85.2, which ranked 16th among all qualifying cornerbacks in 2011.

==== 2012 season ====
Sherman entered training camp slated as the starting cornerback, but saw minor competition from Marcus Trufant. Head coach Pete Carroll named Sherman and Brandon Browner the starting cornerbacks to begin the regular season.

Sherman started in the season opener at the Arizona Cardinals and made four solo tackles, two pass deflections, and intercepted a pass by John Skelton in their 20–16 loss. On October 14, 2012, Sherman made three solo tackles, three pass deflections, and an interception during a 24–23 win against the New England Patriots. After the game, Sherman taunted quarterback Tom Brady and posted a photo of himself yelling at Brady with "U mad bro?" superimposed on it on his Twitter account. He later removed the post. Prior to Week 8 against Detroit, Sherman nicknamed himself Optimus Prime, an action intended to send out the message that he would shut down Detroit's wide receiver, Calvin Johnson, known by his nickname Megatron. He collected a season-high eight combined tackles and held Calvin Johnson to three catches for 46-yards as the Seahawks lost 28–24 at the Detroit Lions.

On November 11, 2012, Sherman recorded three combined tackles, three pass deflections, an interception, and made his first career sack during a 28–7 victory over the New York Jets. Sherman sacked quarterback Mark Sanchez and forced a fumble that was recovered by teammate Jason Jones in the fourth quarter. Sherman earned NFC Defensive Player of the Week for his performance against the Jets. Two weeks later, it was reported that Sherman and teammate Brandon Browner were both facing four-game suspensions after they were accused of taking Adderall which violated the league's policy against performance-enhancing substances. On December 9, 2012, Sherman recorded two combined tackles, deflected three passes, recovered a fumble, made two interceptions, and returned an interception for his first NFL touchdown during the Seahawks' 58–0 victory against the Arizona Cardinals. Sherman intercepted a pass by quarterback John Skelton, that was originally intended for wide receiver Larry Fitzgerald, and returned it for a 19-yard touchdown in the second quarter. In Week 16, Sherman made five combined tackles, a season-high four pass deflections, and intercepted a pass by quarterback Colin Kaepernick during a 42–13 victory against the San Francisco 49ers. During the second quarter, Sherman recovered a blocked field goal and returned it for a 90-yard touchdown after teammate Red Bryant blocked a 21-yard field goal attempt by 49ers' kicker David Akers. On December 27, 2012, it was announced that Sherman won his appeal of a four-game suspension for violating the league's performance-enhancing drug policy. Sherman had intentions to sue the league if the suspension was upheld. He started all 16 games and made 64 combined tackles (53 solo), a career-high 24 pass deflections, eight interceptions, a touchdown, and a sack. He received an overall grade of 94.3 from Pro Football Focus in 2012. Sherman earned First Team All-Pro honors.

The Seattle Seahawks finished second in the NFC West with an 11–5 record and earned a playoff berth. On January 6, 2013, Sherman started in his first career playoff game as the Seahawks defeated the Washington Redskins 24–14 in the NFC Wild Card Round. The following week, he made three pass deflections as the Seahawks were eliminated from the playoffs following a 30–28 loss at the Atlanta Falcons in the NFC Divisional Round.

==== 2013 season ====
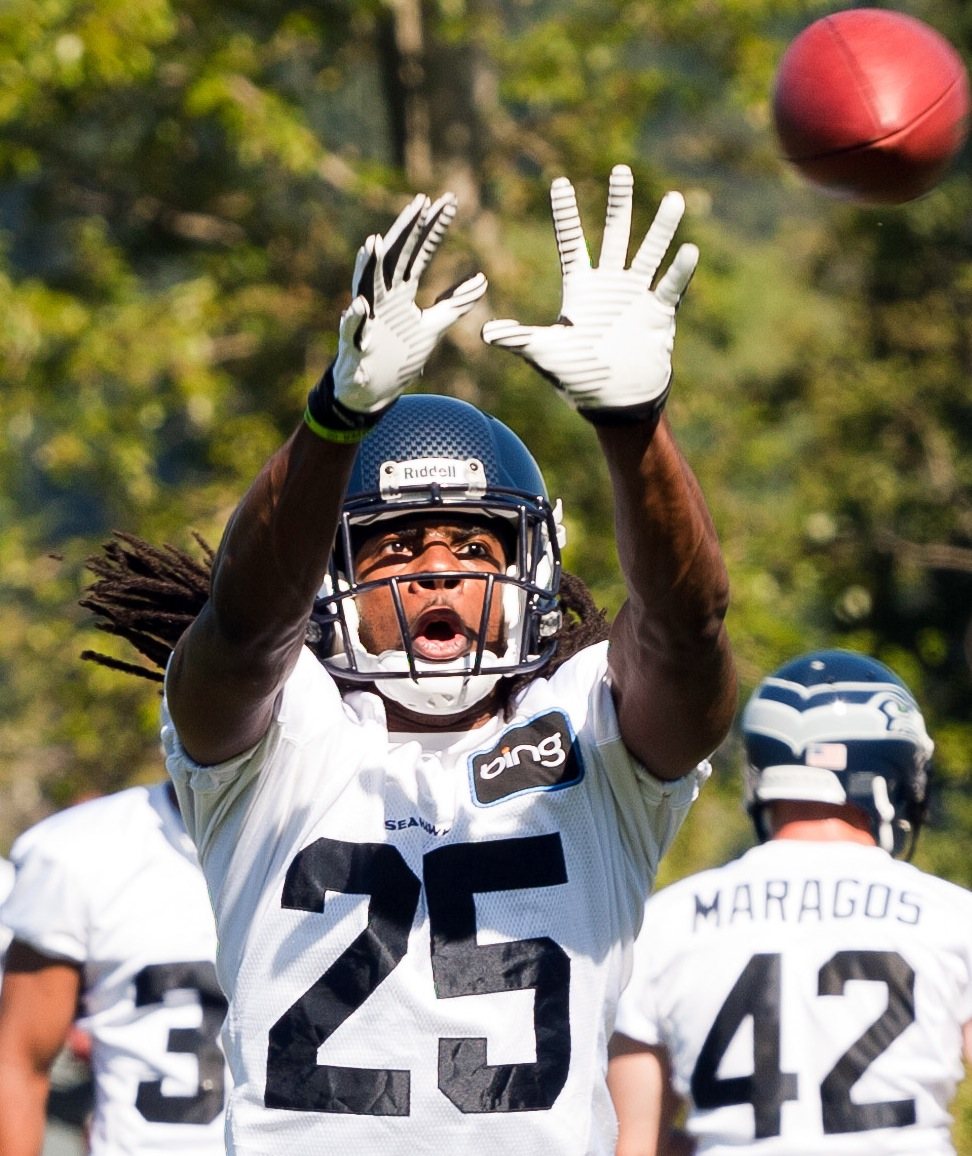
Sherman during training camp in 2013

Sherman and Brandon Browner returned as the starting cornerbacks alongside safeties Earl Thomas and Kam Chancellor. In Week 2, Sherman earned NFC Defensive Player of the Week for his game against San Francisco. In Week 4, Sherman made four solo tackles, two pass deflections, and returned an interception for a touchdown as the Seahawks' defeated the Houston Texans 23–20 in a comeback victory. Sherman intercepted a pass by quarterback Matt Schaub, that was intended for tight end Owen Daniels, and returned it for a 58-yard touchdown in the fourth quarter despite losing his shoe to tie the game 20–20 which sent it into overtime. He earned NFC Defensive Player of the Month for September. In Week 15, he made two combined tackles, a season-high three pass deflections, and intercepted two passes by quarterback Eli Manning in a 23–0 win at the New York Giants. He earned NFC Defensive Player of the Week for his game against the Giants. The following week, he recorded a season-high eight combined tackles, deflected two passes, and intercepted two passes by quarterback Carson Palmer during a 17–10 loss to the Arizona Cardinals in Week 16. On December 27, 2013, it was announced that Sherman was voted to the 2014 Pro Bowl, marking the first Pro Bowl selection of his career. He finished the season with 48 combined tackles (38 solo), 16 pass deflections, eight interceptions, and a touchdown in 16 games and 16 starts. He was voted to the Associated Press NFL All-Pro First Team for the second consecutive season. Sherman received an overall grade of 87.8 from Pro Football Focus in 2013.

The Legion of Boom allowed the fewest passing yards in the league and the Seahawks had the top ranked defense in 2013. The Seahawks finished atop the NFC West with a 13–3 record and earned a first round bye. The Seahawks reached the NFC Championship after defeating the New Orleans Saints 23–15 in the NFC Divisional Round. On January 19, 2014, Sherman made two combined tackles and a pass deflection as the Seahawks defeated the San Francisco 49ers 23–17 in the NFC Championship Game. He played a crucial role by deflecting a pass by quarterback Colin Kaepernick that was intended for Michael Crabtree, which was caught by teammate Malcolm Smith to seal the Seahawks' victory.

The play was later dubbed "the Immaculate Deflection" (as an homage to the Immaculate Reception), and would later be voted by Seahawks fans to be the most significant play in franchise history. After the play, Sherman ran over to Crabtree and offered a handshake with Crabtree responding by shoving Sherman in his facemask. Sherman proceeded to make a choke sign towards Kaepernick and was immediately penalized by the officials for unsportsmanlike conduct. The NFL went on to fine Sherman $7,875 for his taunting directed towards Kaepernick.

"Well, I'm the best corner in the game! When you try me with a sorry receiver like Crabtree, that's the result you gon' get! Don't you ever talk about me! Don't you open your mouth about the best, or y'know I'm gonna shut it for you real quick! L.O.B.!"

— Sherman speaking about Michael Crabtree during a post-game interview on Fox Sports with Erin Andrews after the Seahawks' victory in the NFC Championship Game

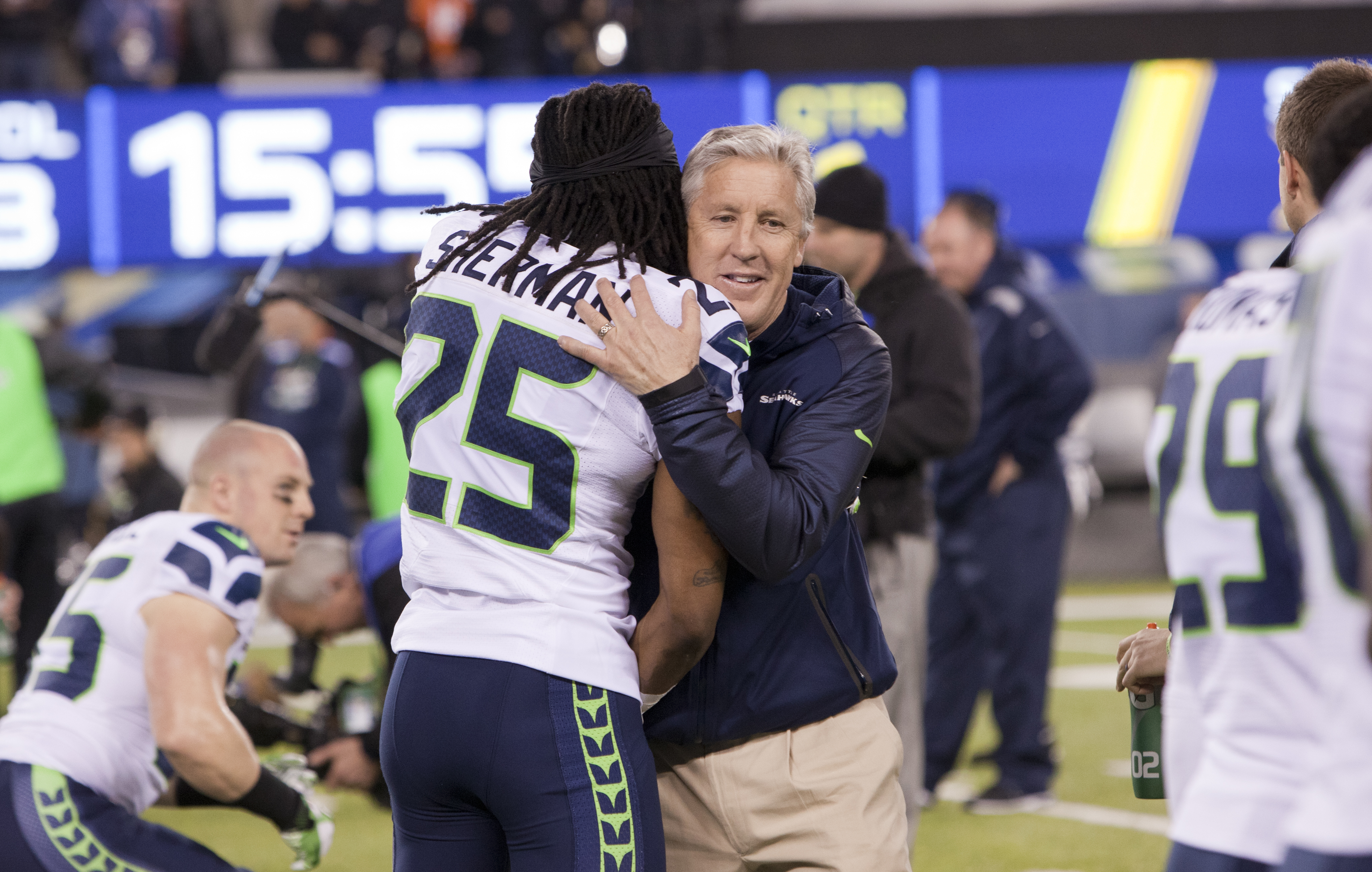
Sherman embracing Pete Carroll at Super Bowl XLVIII

Sherman's rant was the subject of scrutiny by fans and the media, some of whom deemed him a "thug". He later blamed Crabtree's shove for fueling his post-game rant, though Sherman also said that he regretted his attack and was dismayed by the negative response from the public. In response to the word "thug" being widely used to criticize Sherman following the incident, he said, "The reason it bothers me is because it seems like it's an accepted way of calling somebody the N-word now."

On February 2, 2014, Sherman started in Super Bowl XLVIII, recording three combined tackles and a pass deflection. He left the game with a high ankle sprain and spent majority of the fourth quarter on the sidelines with a walking boot and crutches in Seattle’s dominant 43–8 victory over Denver Broncos, the league's best offense. Sherman held wide receiver Eric Decker to one reception on five targets for a total of six-yards during the game.

==== 2014 season ====
On May 7, 2014, the Seahawks signed Sherman to a four-year, $56 million contract extension with $40 million guaranteed and a signing bonus of $11 million. The agreement made him the highest paid cornerback in league history. On June 6, Sherman was announced as the cover athlete for Madden 15.

Defensive coordinator Dan Quinn retained Sherman as the Seahawks' No. 1 starting cornerback alongside Byron Maxwell. In Week 6, he collected a season-high eight combined tackles during a 30–23 loss to the Dallas Cowboys. On November 27, 2014, Sherman made two solo tackles, two pass deflections, and intercepted two passes by Colin Kaepernick during the Seahawks' 19–3 win at San Francisco during the Thanksgiving Day game. His performance earned him the NFC Defensive Player of Week award. Sherman started all 16 games in 2014 and made 57 combined tackles (45 solo), eight passes defensed, and four interceptions. Pro Football Focus gave Sherman an overall grade of 89.9 in 2014. He was named to the Pro Bowl and earned First Team All-Pro honors.

The Seahawks finished atop the NFC West with a 12–4 record and earned the #1-seed in the NFC. On January 10, 2015, Sherman recorded three combined tackles, two pass deflections, and intercepted Cam Newton during the Seahawks' 31–17 victory over the Carolina Panthers in the NFC Divisional Round. The following week, Sherman made four combined tackles, a pass deflection, and intercepted Aaron Rodgers during a 28–22 comeback overtime victory over the Green Bay Packers in the NFC Championship Game. On February 1, 2015, Sherman started in Super Bowl XLIX and made three combined tackles as the Seahawks lost 28–24 to the New England Patriots. The following day, it was announced that Sherman would need Tommy John surgery to repair a torn ligament in his left elbow. Following the conclusion of the NFL season, the Pro Football Writers Association selected Sherman to win the PFWA Good Guy Award for his willingness to work with and provide insightful information to the media. He was the second consecutive Seahawk to win the award, as quarterback Russell Wilson was the previous recipient. Sherman was awarded NFC Defensive Player of the Year honors by the Kansas City Committee. He was ranked 11th by his fellow players on the NFL Top 100 Players of 2015.

==== 2015 season ====
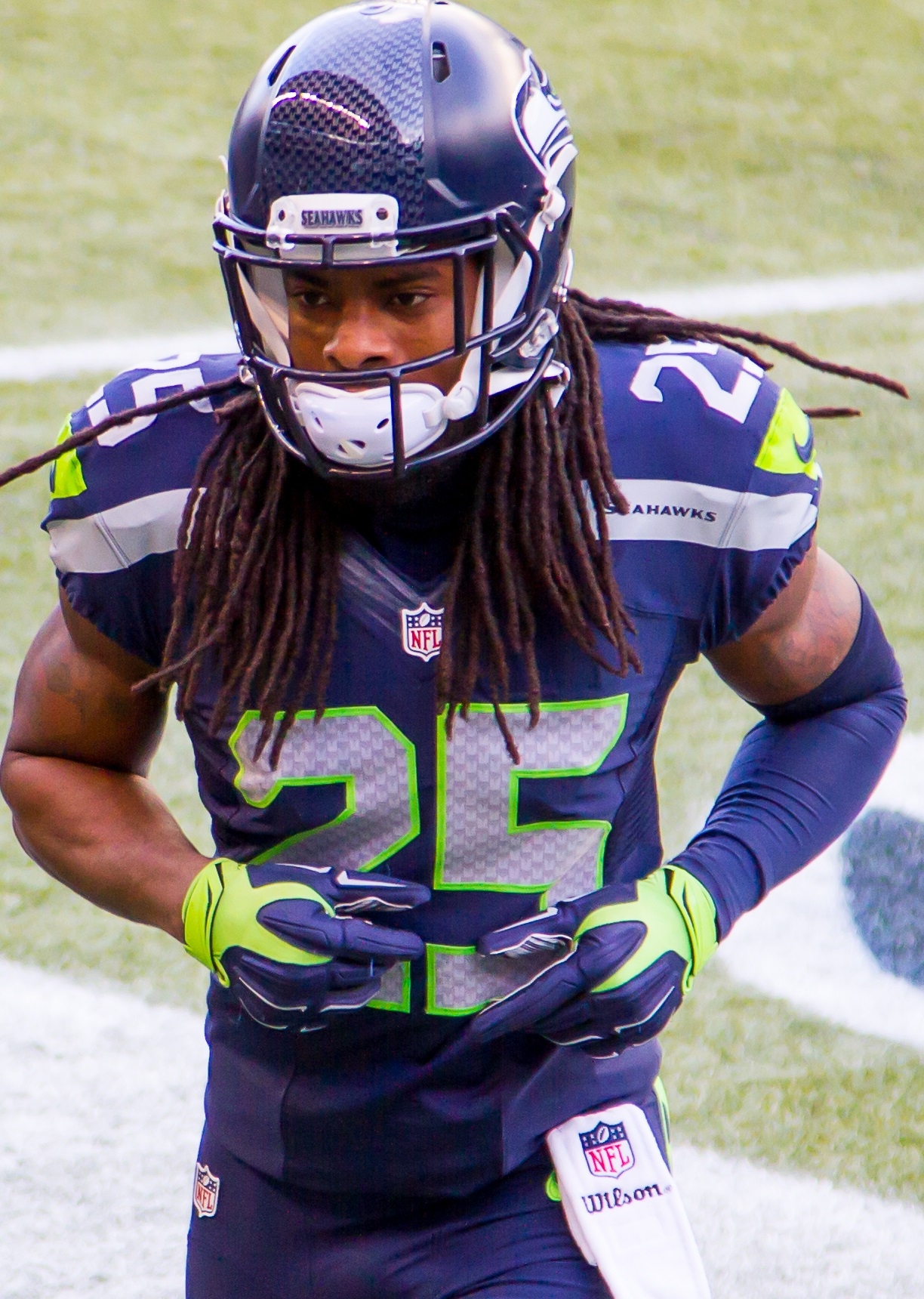
Sherman in 2015

New defensive coordinator Kris Richard retained Sherman as the No. 1 starting cornerback on the depth chart in 2015, along with Cary Williams. Sherman was voted to the 2016 Pro Bowl, marking his third consecutive selection. He started all 16 games in 2015 and recorded 50 combined tackles (33 solo), 14 pass deflections, and two interceptions. Pro Football Focus gave Sherman an overall grade of 86.7 in 2015. The Seattle Seahawks finished second in the NFC West with a 10–6 record and earned a Wild Card berth. They reached the NFC Divisional Round before losing 31–24 at the Carolina Panthers. He was ranked 20th by his fellow players on the NFL Top 100 Players of 2016.

==== 2016 season ====
Head coach Pete Carroll named Sherman and Jeremy Lane the starting cornerbacks to begin the regular season.

On October 2, 2016, Sherman recorded five combined tackles, deflected two passes, and intercepted two passes by Jets' quarterback Ryan Fitzpatrick during a 27–17 victory at the New York Jets. In Week 8, Sherman collected a season-high eight combined tackles during a 25–20 loss at the New Orleans Saints.

On December 20, 2016, Sherman was voted to the 2017 Pro Bowl. He started all 16 games in 2016 and made 58 combined tackles (38 solo), 13 pass deflections, and four interceptions. Sherman was also ranked 21st by his peers on the NFL Top 100 Players of 2017. Pro Football Focus gave Sherman an overall grade of 84.6, which ranked 13th among all qualifying cornerbacks in 2016.

After the season, it was revealed that Sherman was battling a sprained MCL in his right knee, an injury that hampered him during the second half of the year. The Seahawks were suspected to have failed to disclose this injury, which prompted the NFL to investigate. If the injury was not disclosed in time, the Seahawks could have faced a heavy fine as well as a forfeiting a second-round pick in the 2017 Draft. Ultimately, the Seahawks were not penalized.

==== 2017 season ====
Sherman and Jeremy Lane returned as the starting cornerbacks for the Seahawks in 2017.

Sherman was bothered in 2017 by his Achilles, which he initially injured in Week 5 during a 16–10 win against the Los Angeles Rams. In the following weeks, he tried to avoid making any severe cuts. On October 29, 2017, Sherman made four combined tackles, two pass deflections, and intercepted two passes by quarterback Deshaun Watson during a 41–38 victory against the Houston Texans. During Week 10 in a 22–16 win at the Arizona Cardinals, he left the game in the third quarter after rupturing his Achilles, and was ruled out for the season. It would be his final game as a Seahawk, as he was released the following offseason. He finished the season with 35 combined tackles (25 solo), seven pass deflections, and two interceptions in ten games and ten starts. His injury ended his streak of 106 consecutive game appearances and 100 consecutive starts. Sherman received an overall grade of 82.7 from Pro Football Focus, which ranked 33rd among all qualifying cornerbacks in 2017. Despite only playing nine games, he was ranked 64th by his peers on the NFL Top 100 Players of 2018.

On March 7, 2018, it was reported that Sherman did not expect to return to the Seahawks for the 2018 season, and that he had spent the previous day telling his teammates goodbye. Sherman was officially released on March 9, 2018.

=== San Francisco 49ers ===
==== 2018 season ====
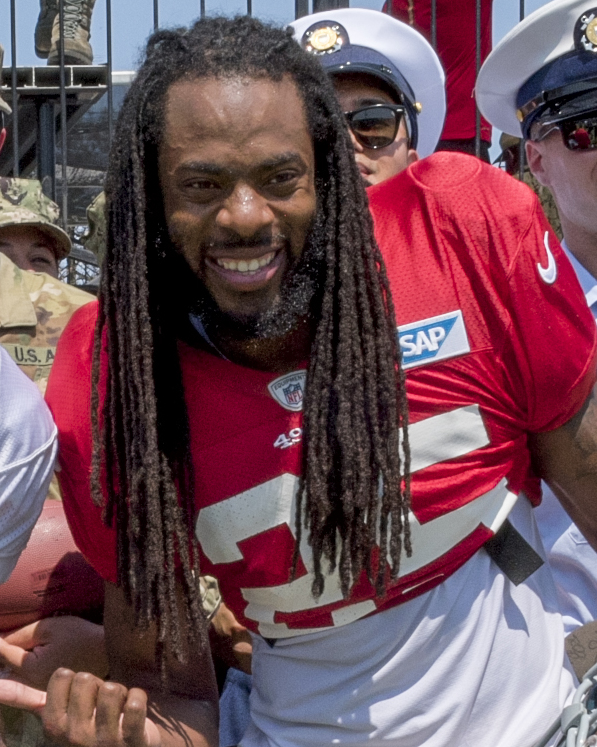
Sherman at training camp in 2018

On March 10, 2018, just a day after being released by the Seahawks, Sherman agreed to a three-year, $39 million contract with the San Francisco 49ers.

Sherman made his 49ers debut during the season opener against the Minnesota Vikings, recording two tackles and a fumble recovery in the 24–16 loss. During Week 8 against the Arizona Cardinals, Sherman recorded a season-high seven tackles and sacked rookie quarterback Josh Rosen once in the 18–15 road loss.

During Week 16 against the Chicago Bears, Sherman was ejected from the game after throwing punches at Bears' wide receivers Josh Bellamy and Anthony Miller, who were also ejected. The incident was triggered after 49ers' safety Marcell Harris made a late hit on Bears' quarterback Mitchell Trubisky. On December 29, Sherman was fined $10,026.

Sherman finished his first season with the 49ers with 37 tackles, a sack, four passes defended, and a fumble recovery in 14 games played.

==== 2019 season ====
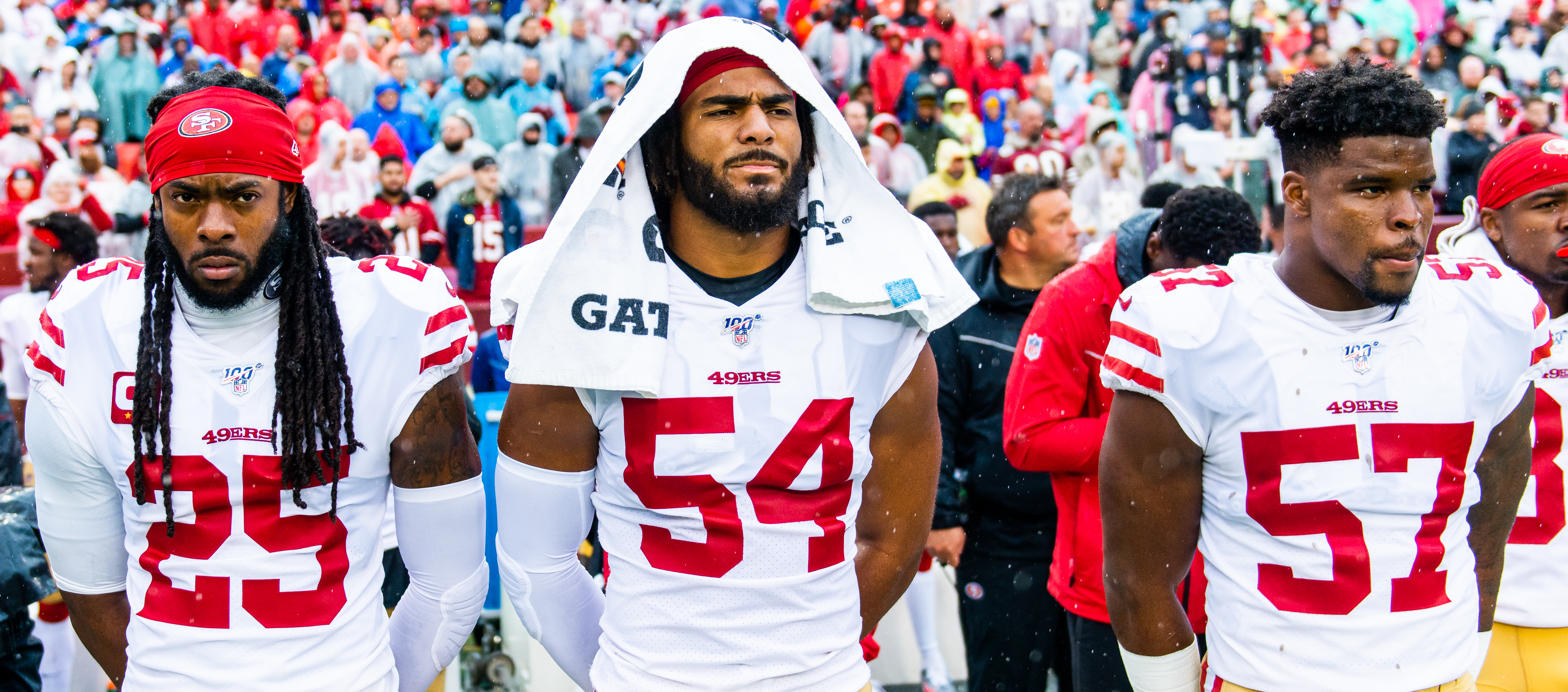
Sherman alongside Fred Warner and Dre Greenlaw in a game against the Washington Redskins

In Week 1 against the Tampa Bay Buccaneers, Sherman intercepted a pass thrown by Jameis Winston and returned it 37 yards for a touchdown in the 31–17 win. This was Sherman's first interception and touchdown as a member of the 49ers. During Week 5 against the Cleveland Browns, Sherman recorded an interception off Baker Mayfield in the 31–3 victory. Three weeks later against the Carolina Panthers, Sherman recorded his third interception of the season off Kyle Allen in the 51–13 victory. On December 17, Sherman was selected to his fifth Pro Bowl, his first with the 49ers and first since 2016 with the Seahawks.

In the Divisional Round against the Minnesota Vikings, Sherman intercepted a pass thrown by Kirk Cousins and returned it for 13 yards during the 27–10 victory. During the NFC Championship Game against the Green Bay Packers, Sherman recorded two tackles and picked off Aaron Rodgers in the final two minutes of the game, which sealed a 37–20 victory and a trip to Super Bowl LIV. In the Super Bowl against the Kansas City Chiefs, Sherman's quest for a second Lombardi Trophy failed as the 49ers were defeated 31–20 in a game in which he was criticized for a poor performance during the Chiefs' game-winning drive, as he gave up a 38-yard reception to wide receiver Sammy Watkins and then missed an important goal-line tackle on running back Damien Williams, allowing him to score the touchdown that gave the Chiefs a 24–20 lead with under three minutes to play. Sherman was ranked 28th by his fellow players on the NFL Top 100 Players of 2020. He was named to the Pro Football Hall of Fame All-2010s Team.

==== 2020 season ====
On September 16, 2020, Sherman was placed on injured reserve with a calf strain. He was activated on November 28. In Week 12 against the Los Angeles Rams, Sherman recorded his first interception of the season off a pass thrown by Jared Goff during the 23–20 road victory.

On February 17, 2021, with his contract expiring, it was announced the 49ers wouldn't be re-signing Sherman.

=== Tampa Bay Buccaneers ===
On September 29, 2021, Sherman signed with the Tampa Bay Buccaneers on a one-year deal worth $2.25 million.

In Week 7, against the Chicago Bears, Sherman served as the Defensive Backs Coach for the Buccaneers during the game and in practice that week due to Defensive Backs Coach Kevin Ross being ineligible due to COVID-19 protocols. During pregame warm-ups before the Week 10 game against the Washington Football Team, Sherman suffered a calf injury which caused him to miss the game and to be placed on injured reserve three days later. He was activated on December 10 in time for the team's Week 14 game against the Buffalo Bills, where Sherman recorded his only interception of the season off a pass thrown by Josh Allen in the Buccaneers' 33–27 overtime victory. He was placed back on injured reserve on January 11, 2022, with an Achilles injury, ending his season. Sherman finished the season playing in just five games with three starts, recording 11 tackles, a pass deflection, and an interception.

== Career statistics ==
Legend
	Won the Super Bowl
	Led the league
**Bold**	Career high

=== NFL ===
==== Regular season ====
Year	Team	Games		Tackles				Interceptions						Fumbles			
Year	Team	GP	GS	Comb	Solo	Ast	Sack	PD	Int	Yds	Avg	Lng	TD	FF	FR	Yds	TD
2011	SEA	16	10	55	47	8	0.0	17	4	45	11.2	33	0	1	0	0	0
2012	SEA	16	16	**64**	**53**	11	**1.0**	**24**	**8**	57	7.1	29	**1**	**3**	1	0	0
2013	SEA	16	16	48	38	10	0.0	16	**8**	**125**	15.6	**58T**	**1**	0	**2**	0	0
2014	SEA	16	16	57	45	12	0.0	8	4	81	20.2	53	0	1	0	0	0
2015	SEA	16	16	50	33	17	0.0	14	2	30	15.0	26	0	0	0	0	0
2016	SEA	16	16	58	38	**20**	0.0	13	4	37	9.2	31	0	0	1	**14**	0
2017	SEA	9	9	35	25	10	0.0	7	2	20	10.0	19	0	0	1	0	0
2018	SF	14	14	37	30	7	**1.0**	4	0	0	0.0	0	0	0	1	0	0
2019	SF	15	15	61	48	13	0.0	11	3	65	**21.7**	31T	**1**	0	0	0	0
2020	SF	5	5	18	16	2	0.0	1	1	18	18.0	18	0	0	0	0	0
2021	TB	5	3	11	11	0	0.0	1	1	0	0.0	0	0	0	1	4	0
Total		143	136	495	385	110	2.0	116	37	478	12.9	58T	3	5	7	18	0

==== Postseason ====
Year	Team	Games		Tackles				Interceptions						Fumbles			
Year	Team	GP	GS	Comb	Solo	Ast	Sack	PD	Int	Yds	Avg	Lng	TD	FF	FR	Yds	TD
2012	SEA	2	2	0	0	0	0.0	**3**	0	0	0.0	0	0	0	0	0	0
2013	SEA	3	3	10	4	6	0.0	2	0	0	0.0	0	0	0	0	0	0
2014	SEA	3	3	10	7	3	0.0	**3**	**2**	0	0.0	0	0	0	0	0	0
2015	SEA	2	2	9	**8**	1	0.0	2	0	0	0.0	0	0	0	0	0	0
2016	SEA	2	2	**13**	7	**6**	0.0	0	0	0	0.0	0	0	0	0	0	0
2019	SF	3	3	9	6	3	0.0	2	**2**	**16**	**8.0**	**13**	0	0	0	0	0
2021	TB	0	0	Did not play due to injury													
Total		15	15	51	32	19	0.0	12	4	16	4.0	13	0	0	0	0	0

=== College ===
Season	Team	Pos	GP	Receiving				Tackles					Interceptions				
Season	Team	Pos	GP	Rec	Yds	Avg	TD	Comb	Solo	Ast	TFL	Sck	Int	Yds	Avg	TD	PD
2006	Stanford	WR	12	34	581	**17.1**	3	—	—	—	—	—	—	—	—	—	—
2007	Stanford	WR	11	**39**	**651**	16.7	**4**	1	1	0	0.0	0.0	—	—	—	—	—
2008	Stanford	WR	5	8	108	13.5	0	—	—	—	—	—	—	—	—	—	—
*2009	Stanford	DB	13	—	—	—	—	**62**	39	**23**	0.0	0.0	2	**43**	**21.5**	**1**	—
*2010	Stanford	DB	13	—	—	—	—	50	**40**	10	**1.0**	0.0	**4**	39	9.8	0	—
Career			53	81	1,340	16.5	7	113	80	33	1.0	0.0	6	82	13.7	1	0

== Post-NFL career ==
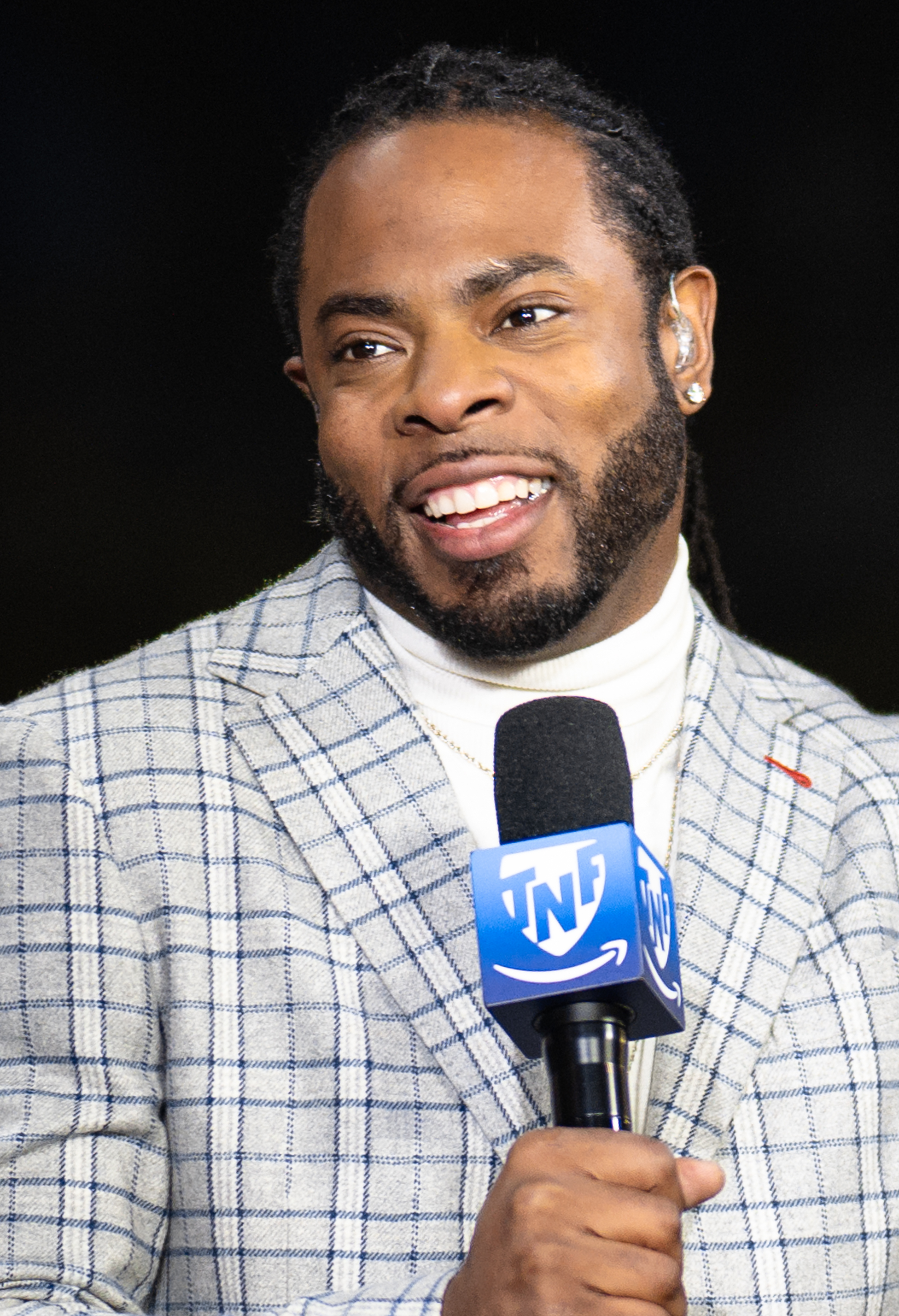
Sherman with Amazon in 2023

On June 14, 2022, it was announced that Sherman would become a pregame and postgame analyst for Amazon.

In addition to being a pregame and postgame analyst for Amazon, Sherman also co-hosts The Richard Sherman Podcast, alongside his former player agent and good friend, Mitchell Eisenstein. The podcast, which is currently under The Volume brand debuted on August 31, 2022. The podcast was originally under the Pro Football Focus label when it debuted, when it switched to The Volume brand on July 20, 2022.

Sherman appeared alongside former teammate Marshawn Lynch on the FOX show Stars on Mars, which aired on June 5, 2023.

In August 2023, it was reported that Sherman would be replacing Shannon Sharpe as Skip Bayless's co-host of the sports debate show Undisputed. Sherman made his debut on Undisputed on August 28, 2023. Sherman appeared only for one season due to Bayless' departure from Fox Sports on August 2, 2024.

On October 3, 2023, Sherman alongside former LOB teammate Kam Chancellor and business partner Leilani Wong opened a sports bar in Bellevue, Washington. The trio have been co-owners of the bar ever since.

== Personal life ==
On February 5, 2015, four days after Super Bowl XLIX, Sherman's girlfriend gave birth to their first child, a son. Ashley Moss and Sherman were engaged in June 2015. They welcomed their second child, a daughter, on April 16, 2016. Sherman and Moss were married on March 28, 2018.

Sherman's outspoken personality, tendency for making big plays, and his frequent trash-talk made him one of the NFL's best-known players of his era. In January 2014, Sherman garnered national attention with a post-game interview made immediately after his tipped pass ensured the Seahawks a victory over the San Francisco 49ers in the 2013 NFC Championship game, in which he labeled himself the "best corner in the game" and called San Francisco wide receiver Michael Crabtree, to whom the decisive pass had been thrown, a "sorry" receiver. Sherman was featured on the cover of Madden NFL 15. He also actively writes for The Players' Tribune.

Sherman has his own charity called Blanket Coverage – The Richard Sherman Family Foundation. In 2013, Sherman started his charity to help children in low-income communities by providing them with school supplies and clothing. Sherman's foundation was formed to help children across the country achieve academic success.

Sherman is interested in cryptocurrency and tech stocks and is also an ambassador for the trivia app FleetWit. He is a co-owner of the Glacier Boyz for the Fan Controlled Football league. Their first game was on February 13, 2021.

Sherman owns homes in Yorba Linda, California and Maple Valley, Washington.

=== Legal issues ===
On July 14, 2021, Sherman was arrested in Redmond, Washington and initially booked on suspicion of burglary domestic violence, a felony charge which was later dropped. His charges were later updated to include five misdemeanors: second-degree criminal trespass and malicious mischief in the third degree, both with a domestic violence designation, as well as resisting arrest, driving while under the influence, and reckless endangerment of roadway workers. Sherman required stitches on his ankle as a result of the officer's deployment of a police dog to subdue him. Sherman was treated at a hospital prior to being taken to jail. He was booked into the King County Correctional Facility in Seattle shortly after 6:00 a.m. on July 14. Sherman was denied bail on the day of his arrest. The next day, the King County judge ordered Sherman released on his own recognizance. The NFL reportedly activated its emergency Domestic Violence protocols and opened an investigation into the matter to determine appropriate discipline for Sherman on July 14.

In a March 2022 plea bargain, Sherman pleaded guilty to first-degree negligent driving, second-degree criminal trespass, and speeding in a roadway construction zone. He was placed under court supervision for up to two years and ordered to pay $2,500 in court fees, but serve no additional jail time. Sherman was also ordered to pay restitution to his father-in-law, with the amount to be determined at a later date, and to the Department of Transportation. In addition, Sherman was ordered to undergo 16 hours of community service along with a DUI course.

On February 24, 2024, Sherman was arrested in Seattle for suspicion of DUI.
