= Stanford–USC football rivalry =

American college football rivalry

- Stanford Cardinal USC Trojans
- First meeting: November 4, 1905; Stanford 16, USC 0
- Latest meeting: September 9, 2023; USC 56, Stanford 10
- Next meeting: TBD

Statistics
- Total meetings: 103
- All-time series: USC leads, 65–34–3 (Note: USC vacated 2005 win due to Reggie Bush scandal. Under NCAA rules, neither team gets credit for a vacated win. The on-field record is 66–34–3.)
- Largest victory: USC, 49–0 (1977)
- Longest win streak: USC, 12 (1958–1969)
- Longest unbeaten streak: USC, 15 (1976–1990)
- Current win streak: USC, 2 (2022–present)

Locations of Stanford and USC

The Stanford–USC football rivalry is an American college football rivalry between the Stanford Cardinal and the USC Trojans. The two teams are no longer in the same conference as of 2024 and played the last scheduled game of the series on September 9, 2023, with the Trojans winning 56–10. The two teams first played in 1905 and began playing regularly in 1918. Between 1911 and 1913, there were rugby games played between the two schools. In some places, these games are counted as football games. The only six years in which the rivalry was not played since that year were in 1921, 1924, the three years of World War II (1943–1945), and the COVID season in 2020. The teams have frequently vied for the conference championship and a berth in the Rose Bowl. Stanford is USC's oldest rival.

== Series history ==
=== Early rivalry ===
The rivalry began in earnest in the 1930s after USC had won three national championships in five years. A group of Stanford freshmen, after a stinging 1932 loss to an undefeated USC team, promised never to lose to USC again. The "Vow Boys" made good on their promise, winning their next three games against the Trojans, beginning with the 1933 win that broke USC's 27-game undefeated streak.

=== Notable games and incidents ===
For most of its history, USC dominated the series, and overall USC has won about two-thirds of the games, but the rivalry has been marked with notable incidents and expressions of disdain between the two schools. In 1972, USC coach John McKay accused Stanford and its fans of having "no class" and said he'd "like to beat Stanford by 2,000 points"; Stanford coach Jack Christiansen responded that he wouldn't "get into a urinating contest with a skunk". Two years earlier, when McKay's son J.K. and his high school teammate Pat Haden had told him they were considering going to Stanford, he replied, "If it was between Stanford and Red China, I would pay your way to Peking." Both played at USC under McKay, as the Trojans won national titles in 1972 and 1974. In 1979, Stanford came back in the last four minutes to tie #1 USC 21–21 on October 13. This game, considered one of the greatest of the 20th century, effectively cost USC a national title (they dropped to #4 in the polls afterwards). USC finished 11–0–1, but was ranked #2 in both polls due to the tie. In 1980, the Stanford Band marched onto the field accompanied by a horse skeleton on wheels, being ridden by a Trojan-helmeted human skeleton, in a parody of USC's Traveler mascot. For the 2012 game, the Stanford band leader inexplicably showed up dressed as the USC Trojan mascot.

=== Recent history ===
USC cemented its margin in the series between 1958 and 1990, going 29–3–1. The competitive atmosphere of the rivalry increased in the early 1990s when Bill Walsh returned for his second tenure as Stanford's head coach, and particularly heated up in 2007 after Stanford hired head coach Jim Harbaugh. 1–3, unranked Stanford (who had been 1–11 the prior season under head coach Walt Harris) entered the 2007 game as a 41-point underdog against #2 USC, but pulled out a 24–23 win in what has been called one of the biggest college football upsets of all time.

The 2009 game was marked by a post-game verbal confrontation between Harbaugh and USC head coach Pete Carroll, after #25 Stanford capped off its convincing 55–21 win over #11 USC with a late 2-point conversion attempt and another touchdown; Carroll came off the field saying "What's your deal?" at Harbaugh, who responded, "What's your deal?" Stanford then adopted the phrase as a slogan for its season ticket packages.

In recent years, the rivalry has been memorable for its upsets. The lower-ranked team pulled off an upset six out of nine years from 2007 to 2015 (four by Stanford and two by USC), including four years in a row from 2012 to 2015 (two each for Stanford and USC). In 2012, #21 Stanford knocked off the #2 Trojans, 21–14. In 2013, unranked USC defeated #5 Stanford 20–17, ending Stanford's longest winning streak in the series at four, and possibly costing the Cardinal a trip to the national championship game. In 2015, unranked Stanford went on the road and upset #6 USC 41–31. In 2021, unranked Stanford went on the road and upset #14 USC 42–28, resulting in USC head coach Clay Helton's firing immediately after.

In 2010, the then-Pac-10 Conference expanded to 12 teams and split into north and south divisions, moving Stanford and USC into different divisions. This move threatened the annual rivalry, since teams from each division were not scheduled to play each other every year; however, the conference elected to maintain the "historic California rivalries", including both the Stanford–USC rivalry and the Cal-UCLA rivalry.

Both teams being ranked entering the game was once a rare occurrence but has become the norm in recent years. There have been 15 games where both Stanford and USC were ranked, with 2 from 1940 to 1953, 4 from 1968 to 1972, just 1 from 1973 to 2008, and 8 since 2009.

USC leads the series 65–34–3; they have led since the third game. USC holds the longest win streak in the series, with 12 wins from 1958 to 1969. USC also went 14–0–1 from 1976 to 1990, with the two teams playing to a tie in 1979. Stanford's longest win streak was 4 from 2009 to 2012. The early years of the series had near-parity, with USC leading 17–15–2 from 1905 to 1957. USC then went 39–9–1 from 1958 to 2006; however, Stanford is 10–6 since then, including 5 of 8 in the L.A. Coliseum. The teams met twice in 2015 – once in the regular season and, after #7 Stanford and #24 USC won their divisions, a rematch in the Pac-12 Championship Game, which #7 Stanford won 41–22, also ending the four-year streak of upsets in the series. In 2017 the teams, both ranked in the top 15, again met for the conference championship, with USC winning 31–28, the first win by a southern division team since the Pac-12 adopted the championship game format.

== Game results ==
| Stanford victories | USC victories | Tie games |

| No. | Date | Location | Winner | Score |
|---|---|---|---|---|
| 1 | November 4, 1905 | Stanford | Stanford | 16–0 |
| 2 | November 23, 1918 | Pasadena | USC | 25–8 |
| 3 | November 27, 1919 | Los Angeles | USC | 13–0 |
| 4 | October 16, 1920 | Los Angeles | USC | 10–0 |
| 5 | November 11, 1922 | Stanford | USC | 6–0 |
| 6 | October 27, 1923 | Stanford | USC | 14–7 |
| 7 | October 17, 1925 | Los Angeles | Stanford | 13–9 |
| 8 | October 30, 1926 | Los Angeles | Stanford | 13–12 |
| 9 | October 15, 1927 | Stanford | Tie | 13–13 |
| 10 | November 3, 1928 | Los Angeles | USC | 10–0 |
| 11 | October 26, 1929 | Stanford | USC | 7–0 |
| 12 | October 25, 1930 | Los Angeles | USC | 41–12 |
| 13 | November 7, 1931 | Los Angeles | USC | 19–0 |
| 14 | October 22, 1932 | Stanford | USC | 13–0 |
| 15 | November 11, 1933 | Los Angeles | Stanford | 13–7 |
| 16 | October 27, 1934 | Stanford | Stanford | 16–7 |
| 17 | November 9, 1935 | Los Angeles | Stanford | 3–0 |
| 18 | October 24, 1936 | Stanford | #6 USC | 14–7 |
| 19 | November 6, 1937 | Los Angeles | Stanford | 7–6 |
| 20 | October 22, 1938 | Stanford | USC | 13–2 |
| 21 | November 11, 1939 | Los Angeles | #4 USC | 33–0 |
| 22 | October 26, 1940 | Stanford | #9 Stanford | 21–7 |
| 23 | November 8, 1941 | Los Angeles | #9 Stanford | 13–0 |
| 24 | October 24, 1942 | San Francisco | Stanford | 14–6 |
| 25 | October 26, 1946 | Stanford | USC | 28–20 |
| 26 | November 8, 1947 | Los Angeles | #5 USC | 14–0 |
| 27 | October 23, 1948 | Stanford | USC | 7–6 |
| 28 | November 5, 1949 | Los Angeles | Stanford | 34–13 |
| 29 | November 4, 1950 | Stanford | Tie | 7–7 |
| 30 | November 10, 1951 | Los Angeles | Stanford | 27–20 |
| 31 | November 8, 1952 | Stanford | #6 USC | 54–7 |
| 32 | November 7, 1953 | Los Angeles | #17 USC | 23–20 |
| 33 | November 6, 1954 | Stanford | #10 USC | 21–7 |
| 34 | November 5, 1955 | Los Angeles | Stanford | 28–20 |
| 35 | October 27, 1956 | Stanford | Stanford | 27–19 |
| 36 | November 9, 1957 | Los Angeles | Stanford | 35–7 |
| 37 | November 1, 1958 | Stanford | USC | 29–6 |
| 38 | October 24, 1959 | Los Angeles | #5 USC | 30–28 |
| 39 | October 29, 1960 | Stanford | USC | 21–10 |
| 40 | November 11, 1961 | Los Angeles | USC | 30–15 |
| 41 | November 10, 1962 | Stanford | #2 USC | 39–14 |
| 42 | November 9, 1963 | Los Angeles | USC | 25–11 |
| 43 | November 7, 1964 | Stanford | USC | 15–10 |
| 44 | October 16, 1965 | Los Angeles | #6 USC | 14–0 |
| 45 | October 15, 1966 | Stanford | #5 USC | 21–7 |
| 46 | October 7, 1967 | Los Angeles | #1 USC | 30–0 |
| 47 | October 12, 1968 | Stanford | #2 USC | 27–24 |
| 48 | October 11, 1969 | Los Angeles | #4 USC | 26–24 |
| 49 | October 10, 1970 | Stanford | #12 Stanford | 24–14 |
| 50 | October 16, 1971 | Los Angeles | #15 Stanford | 33–18 |
| 51 | October 7, 1972 | Stanford | #1 USC | 30–21 |
| 52 | November 10, 1973 | Los Angeles | #8 USC | 27–26 |
| 53 | November 9, 1974 | Stanford | #11 USC | 35–10 |

| No. | Date | Location | Winner | Score |
|---|---|---|---|---|
| 54 | November 8, 1975 | Los Angeles | Stanford | 13–10 |
| 55 | November 6, 1976 | Stanford | #4 USC | 48–24 |
| 56 | November 5, 1977 | Los Angeles | #16 USC | 49–0 |
| 57 | November 4, 1978 | Stanford | #6 USC | 13–7 |
| 58 | October 13, 1979 | Los Angeles | Tie | 21–21 |
| 59 | November 8, 1980 | Stanford | #4 USC | 34–9 |
| 60 | October 17, 1981 | Los Angeles | #7 USC | 25–17 |
| 61 | October 16, 1982 | Stanford | #14 USC | 41–21 |
| 62 | November 5, 1983 | Los Angeles | USC | 30–7 |
| 63 | November 3, 1984 | Stanford | #18 USC | 20–11 |
| 64 | October 19, 1985 | Los Angeles | USC | 30–6 |
| 65 | October 25, 1986 | Stanford | USC | 10–0 |
| 66 | November 7, 1987 | Los Angeles | USC | 39–24 |
| 67 | September 10, 1988 | Stanford | #6 USC | 24–20 |
| 68 | October 28, 1989 | Los Angeles | #10 USC | 19–0 |
| 69 | October 13, 1990 | Stanford | #16 USC | 37–22 |
| 70 | October 19, 1991 | Los Angeles | Stanford | 24–21 |
| 71 | November 7, 1992 | Stanford | #21 Stanford | 23–9 |
| 72 | November 6, 1993 | Los Angeles | USC | 45–20 |
| 73 | October 15, 1994 | Stanford | USC | 27–20 |
| 74 | November 4, 1995 | Los Angeles | #14 USC | 31–30 |
| 75 | November 9, 1996 | Stanford | Stanford | 24–20 |
| 76 | November 8, 1997 | Los Angeles | USC | 45–21 |
| 77 | November 7, 1998 | Stanford | USC | 34–9 |
| 78 | October 23, 1999 | Los Angeles | Stanford | 35–31 |
| 79 | October 21, 2000 | Stanford | Stanford | 32–30 |
| 80 | September 29, 2001 | Los Angeles | Stanford | 21–16 |
| 81 | November 9, 2002 | Stanford | #10 USC | 49–17 |
| 82 | October 11, 2003 | Los Angeles | #9 USC | 44–21 |
| 83 | September 25, 2004 | Stanford | #1 USC | 31–28 |
| 84 | November 5, 2005 | Los Angeles | #1 USC^{†} | 51–21 |
| 85 | November 4, 2006 | Stanford | #9 USC | 42–0 |
| 86 | October 6, 2007 | Los Angeles | Stanford | 24–23 |
| 87 | November 15, 2008 | Stanford | #6 USC | 45–23 |
| 88 | November 14, 2009 | Los Angeles | #25 Stanford | 55–21 |
| 89 | October 9, 2010 | Stanford | #16 Stanford | 37–35 |
| 90 | October 29, 2011 | Los Angeles | #4 Stanford | 56–48^{3OT} |
| 91 | September 15, 2012 | Stanford | #21 Stanford | 21–14 |
| 92 | November 16, 2013 | Los Angeles | USC | 20–17 |
| 93 | September 6, 2014 | Stanford | #14 USC | 13–10 |
| 94 | September 19, 2015 | Los Angeles | Stanford | 41–31 |
| 95 | December 5, 2015‡ | Santa Clara | #7 Stanford | 41–22 |
| 96 | September 17, 2016 | Stanford | #7 Stanford | 27–10 |
| 97 | September 10, 2017 | Los Angeles | #6 USC | 42–24 |
| 98 | December 1, 2017‡ | Santa Clara | #11 USC | 31–28 |
| 99 | September 8, 2018 | Stanford | #10 Stanford | 17–3 |
| 100 | September 7, 2019 | Los Angeles | USC | 45–20 |
| 101 | September 11, 2021 | Los Angeles | Stanford | 42–28 |
| 102 | September 10, 2022 | Stanford | #10 USC | 41–28 |
| 103 | September 9, 2023 | Los Angeles | #6 USC | 56–10 |
Series: USC leads 65–34–3
† USC vacated this win after NCAA sanctions ‡ Pac-12 Football Championship Game

== See also ==
- List of NCAA college football rivalry games
- List of most-played college football series in NCAA Division I
- California–UCLA football rivalry
- Pete Carroll–Jim Harbaugh rivalry
